= 2017 Notre Dame Fighting Irish football team =

American college football season

2017 Notre Dame Fighting Irish football

Citrus Bowl champion

Citrus Bowl, W 21–17 vs. LSU
- Conference: Independent

Ranking
- Coaches: No. 11
- AP: No. 11
- Record: 10–3
- Head coach: Brian Kelly (8th season)
- Offensive coordinator: Chip Long (1st season)
- Offensive scheme: Spread
- Defensive coordinator: Mike Elko (1st season)
- Base defense: 4–2–5
- MVP: Quenton Nelson
- Captains: Josh Adams; Greer Martini; Mike McGlinchey; Nyles Morgan; Quenton Nelson; Chase Summerfield; Drue Tranquill; Austin Webster
- Home stadium: Notre Dame Stadium

2017 NCAA Division I FBS independents football records
	Conf.			Overall
Team	W		L	W		L
Army		–		10	–	3
No. 11 Notre Dame		–		10	–	3
UMass		–		4	–	8
BYU		–		4	–	9
Rankings from AP Poll

The 2017 Notre Dame Fighting Irish football team was an American football team that represented the University of Notre Dame as an independent during the 2017 NCAA Division I FBS football season. In their eighth year under head coach Brian Kelly, the Irish compiled a 10–3 record, outscored opponents by a total of 445 to 279, and were ranked No. 11 in both the AP and Coaches Polls. In six games against ranked opponents, they lost to No. 15 Georgia, No. 7 Miami (FL), and No. 20 Stanford, and defeated No. 11 USC, No. 14 NC State, and No. 16 2017 LSU Tigers football team, the latter in the Citrus Bowl.

The team's statistical leaders included quarterback Brandon Wimbush (1,870 passing yards), running back Josh Adams (1,430 rushing yards), wide receiver Equanimeous St. Brown (33 receptions for 515 yards), kicker Justin Yoon (7 points scored), and linebacker Te'von Coney (116 total tackles). Offensive linemen Mike McGlinchey and Quenton Nelson were consensus first-team picks on the 2017 All-America college football team.

The team played its home games at Notre Dame Stadium in Notre Dame, Indiana.

== Schedule ==
Date	Time	Opponent	Rank	Site	TV	Result	Attendance
September 2	3:30 p.m.	Temple		Notre Dame Stadium; Notre Dame, IN	NBC	W 49–16	77,622
September 9	7:30 p.m.	No. 15 Georgia	No. 24	Notre Dame Stadium; Notre Dame, IN	NBC	L 19–20	77,622
September 16	3:30 p.m.	at Boston College		Alumni Stadium; Chestnut Hill, MA (Holy War)	ESPN, ESPNU	W 49–20	44,500
September 23	8:00 p.m.	at Michigan State		Spartan Stadium; East Lansing, MI (rivalry)	FOX	W 38–18	74,023
September 30	5:00 p.m.	Miami (OH)	No. 22	Notre Dame Stadium; Notre Dame, IN	NBCSN	W 52–17	77,622
October 7	3:30 p.m.	at North Carolina	No. 21	Kenan Memorial Stadium; Chapel Hill, NC (rivalry)	ABC	W 33–10	57,000
October 21	7:30 p.m.	No. 11 USC	No. 13	Notre Dame Stadium; Notre Dame, IN (rivalry)	NBC	W 49–14	77,622
October 28	3:30 p.m.	No. 14 NC State	No. 9	Notre Dame Stadium; Notre Dame, IN	NBC	W 35–14	77,622
November 4	3:30 p.m.	Wake Forest	No. 3	Notre Dame Stadium; Notre Dame, IN	NBC	W 48–37	77,622
November 11	8:00 p.m.	at No. 7 Miami (FL)	No. 3	Hard Rock Stadium; Miami Gardens, FL (rivalry)	ABC	L 8–41	65,326
November 18	3:30 p.m.	Navy	No. 8	Notre Dame Stadium; Notre Dame, IN (rivalry)	NBC	W 24–17	77,622
November 25	8:00 p.m.	at No. 21 Stanford	No. 8	Stanford Stadium; Stanford, CA (rivalry)	ABC	L 20–38	47,352
January 1, 2018	1:00 p.m.	vs. No. 17 LSU	No. 14	Camping World Stadium; Orlando, FL (Citrus Bowl)	ABC	W 21–17	57,726
Rankings from AP Poll and CFP Rankings after October 31 released prior to game; All times are in Eastern time

== Before the season ==
Before the 2017 season began, quarterback DeShone Kizer and defensive end Isaac Rochell were selected in the 2017 NFL draft. Other key players transferred from the program, including quarterback Malik Zaire (to Florida), offensive lineman Tristen Hoge (to BYU), and offensive lineman Parker Boudreaux (to UCF). Inbound transfers included safety Alohi Gilman (from Navy).

The months prior to the season also saw numerous changes in the coaching staff, as assistant head coach Mike Denbrock left for Cincinnati, offensive coordinator Mike Sanford Jr. became head coach at Western Kentucky, and Bob Elliott left for Nebraska. New hires and positions changes included:

- Mike Elko – hired as defensive coordinator
- Chip Long – hired as offensive coordinator and tight ends coach
- Brian Polian – returned as special teams coordinator
- Clark Lea – hired as linebackers coach
- DelVaughn Alexander – hired as wide receivers coach
- Tom Rees – returned as quarterback coach
- Tyler Santucci – hired as defensive analyst
- Matt Balis – hired as director of football performance

== Rankings ==
Ranking movements Legend: ██ Increase in ranking ██ Decrease in ranking RV = Received votes
	Week															
Poll	Pre	1	2	3	4	5	6	7	8	9	10	11	12	13	14	Final
AP	RV	24	RV	RV	22	21	16	13	9	5	3	9	9	15	14	11
Coaches	RV	25	RV	RV	RV	22	19	16	10	8	5	9	9	17	15	11
CFP	Not released									3	3	8	8	15	14	Not released

== Game summaries ==
=== Temple ===
Temple at Notre Dame

Team	1	2	3	4	Total
Owls	3	7	0	6	16
• Fighting Irish	21	7	7	14	49

- Date: September 2, 2017
- Location: Notre Dame Stadium
  South Bend, IN
- Game start: 3:42 p.m. EDT
- Elapsed time: 3 hours and 17 minutes
- Game attendance: 77,622
- Game weather: Temperature: 74 °F (23 °C) • Weather: Sunny • Wind: NW 9 MPH
- Referee: Jeff Heaser
- TV announcers (NBC): Mike Tirico, Doug Flutie and Kathryn Tappen (sideline)

On September 2, Notre Dame defeated Temple, 49–16. The Irish tallied 606 yards of offense including 422 rushing yards. Three Notre Dame backs gained over 100 rushing yards: Josh Adams (161 yards), Dexter Williams (124 yards) and quarterback Brandon Wimbush (106 yards).

=== Georgia ===
Georgia at Notre Dame

Team	1	2	3	4	Total
• No. 15 Bulldogs	3	7	7	3	20
No. 24 Fighting Irish	3	10	3	3	19

- Date: September 9, 2017
- Location: Notre Dame Stadium
  South Bend, IN
- Game start: 7:44 p.m. EDT
- Elapsed time: 3 hours and 36 minutes
- Game attendance: 77,622
- Game weather: Temperature: 67 °F (19 °C) • Weather: Clear • Wind: E 7 MPH
- Referee: Matt Austin
- TV announcers (NBC): Mike Tirico, Doug Flutie and Kathryn Tappen (sideline)

On September 9, Notre Dame lost to Georgia, 20–19. With 3 minutes, 34 seconds left to play, the Bulldogs took a one-point lead on a 30-yard field goal by kicker Rodrigo Blankenship. On The Irish's final drive, Georgia linebacker Davin Bellamy strip-sacked quarterback Brandon Wimbush, and linebacker Lorenzo Carter recovered the fumble with 1:27 left to seal the victory. For the Bulldogs, Jake Fromm made his first career start at quarterback in place of the injured Jacob Eason.

=== Boston College ===
Notre Dame at Boston College
(Holy War)

Team	1	2	3	4	Total
• Fighting Irish	7	7	14	21	49
Eagles	3	7	3	7	20

- Date: September 16, 2017
- Location: Alumni Stadium
  Chestnut Hill, MA
- Game start: 3:41 p.m. EDT
- Elapsed time: 3 hours and 26 minutes
- Game attendance: 44,500
- Game weather: Temperature: 79 °F (26 °C) • Weather: Partly Sunny • Wind: E 1 MPH
- Referee: Stuart Mullins
- TV announcers (ESPN and ESPNU): Steve Levy, Brian Griese and Todd McShay (sideline)

On September 16, Notre Dame defeated Boston College, 49–20. Quarterback Brandon Wimbush rushed for 270 yards with four touchdowns, breaking a record for the most rushing yards by a Notre Dame quarterback. Also, running back Josh Adams rushed for 229 yards in three quarters. It was the first time in Notre Dame football history that two players rushed for more than 200 yards in a single game.

=== Michigan State ===
Notre Dame at Michigan State
(Megaphone Trophy)

Team	1	2	3	4	Total
• Fighting Irish	14	14	7	3	38
Spartans	7	0	3	8	18

- Date: September 23, 2017
- Location: Spartan Stadium
  East Lansing, MI
- Game start: 8:17 p.m. EDT
- Elapsed time: 3 hours and 34 minutes
- Game attendance: 74,023
- Game weather: Temperature: 84 °F (29 °C) • Weather: Clear • Wind: SE 5 MPH
- Referee: Gary Patterson
- TV announcers (Fox): Gus Johnson, Joel Klatt and Jenny Taft (sideline)

On September 28, Notre Dame defeated Michigan State, 38–18. The Irish scored on their opening drive, a seven-play, 78-yard drive that was capped off by quarterback Brandon Wimbush's 16-yard touchdown run. Notre Dame added to their lead three minutes later with a 59-yard interception return for a touchdown by cornerback Julian Love go to up 14–0 over the Spartans. The Irish defense forced three turnovers in the game, all of which the Irish converted into touchdowns. The Irish offense racked up 5.8 yards per play, including rushing for 182 yards against the Spartans defense that came into the game in the top 10 in rush defense.

=== Miami (OH) ===
Miami (OH) at Notre Dame

Team	1	2	3	4	Total
RedHawks	7	7	3	0	17
• No. 22 Fighting Irish	28	17	0	7	52

- Date: September 30, 2017
- Location: Notre Dame Stadium
  South Bend, IN
- Game start: 5:18 p.m. EDT
- Elapsed time: 3 hours and 16 minutes
- Game attendance: 77,622
- Game weather: Temperature: 66 °F (19 °C) • Weather: Sunny • Wind: E 6 MPH
- Referee: Jerry Magallanes
- TV announcers (NBCSN): Paul Burmeister, Doug Flutie and Kathryn Tappen (sideline)

On September 30, Notre Dame defeated Miami (OH), 52–17. On the second play from scrimmage, running back Josh Adam ran 73 yards for a touchdown. Another Adams touchdown run—this one a 59-yarder—was bookended by two Miami turnovers that the Irish converted into 14 points. The 28-point first quarter marked the most points for the Irish in a single period since 2005. The victory was the 900th win in Irish program history.

=== North Carolina ===
Notre Dame at North Carolina

Team	1	2	3	4	Total
• No. 21 Fighting Irish	0	16	10	7	33
Tar Heels	0	7	0	3	10

- Date: October 7, 2017
- Location: Kenan Stadium
  Chapel Hill, NC
- Game start: 3:36 p.m. EDT
- Elapsed time: 3 hours and 28 minutes
- Game attendance: 57,000
- Game weather: Temperature: 83 °F (28 °C) • Weather: Overcast • Wind: SE 7 MPH
- Referee: Gary Patterson
- TV announcers (ABC): Bob Wischusen, Brock Huard and Allison Williams (sideline)

On October 7, Notre Dame defeated North Carolina, 33–10. After a scoreless opening period, quarterback Ian Book found receiver Cameron Smith for a six-yard touchdown pass. On the second play of the next offensive series, running back Josh Adamas scored on a 73-yard touchdown run. Later in the game, running back Deon McIntosh added two rushing scores for the Irish who gained 341 of its 487 total yards on the ground. Book made his first career start at quarterback in place of the injured Brandon Wimbush (right foot).

=== USC ===
USC at Notre Dame
(Jeweled Shillelagh)

Team	1	2	3	4	Total
No. 11 Trojans	0	0	14	0	14
• No. 13 Fighting Irish	14	14	14	7	49

- Date: October 21, 2017
- Location: Notre Dame Stadium
  South Bend, IN
- Game start: 7:43 p.m. EDT
- Elapsed time: 3 hours and 10 minutes
- Game attendance: 77,622
- Game weather: Temperature: 70 °F (21 °C) • Weather: Partly Cloudy • Wind: SSE 9 MPH
- Referee: Jeff Heaser
- TV announcers (NBC): Mike Tirico, Doug Flutie and Kathryn Tappen (sideline)

On October 21, Notre Dame defeated No. 11 USC, 49–14. The Irish defense started the game forcing a USC turnover on the Trojans' first offensive play of the game. The Irish forced three turnovers and took a commanding 28–0 lead at halftime. Running back Josh Adams had 191 rushing yards and three touchdowns, including an 84-yard touchdown run in the third quarter. The Irish rushed for a total of 377 yards and averaged eight yards per carry during the game. With this victory, Notre Dame earned the largest margin of victory in the USC rivalry in a half century. The last time was 51–0 in 1966.

=== NC State ===
NC State at Notre Dame

Team	1	2	3	4	Total
No. 14 Wolfpack	7	7	0	0	14
• No. 9 Fighting Irish	7	14	14	0	35

- Date: October 28, 2017
- Location: Notre Dame Stadium
  South Bend, IN
- Game start: 3:41 p.m. EDT
- Elapsed time: 3 hours and 26 minutes
- Game attendance: 77,622
- Game weather: Temperature: 40 °F (4 °C) • Weather: Cloudy and Chilly • Wind: W 12 MPH
- Referee: Gary Patterson
- TV announcers (NBC): Mike Tirico, Doug Flutie and Kathryn Tappen (sideline)

On October 28, Notre Dame defeated NC State, 35–14. Coming into the game, NC State had a six-game winning streak, and the Irish had a five-game winning streak. NC State had the sixth best rushing defense in the country, andr Notre Dame ahd the sixth best rushing offense. In the first quarter, both offenses struggled to move the ball, but the Wolfpack got on the board first with a blocked punt that was recovered in the end zone to give NC State a 7–0 lead. Notre Dame responded with a two-play drive capped with a touchdown pass by Irish quarterback Brandon Wimbush, who threw a 25-yard touchdown pass to tight end Durham Smythe. The teams traded scores in the second quarter, but the Irish took a 21–14 lead with another touchdown pass by Wimbush, this time an 11-yard pass to wide receiver Kevin Stepherson. Before the first half ended, the Wolfpack was threatening to score, as they had the ball at the Irish 35-yard line. On third and 10, the Irish were able to get a sack on quarterback Ryan Finley to push the Wolfpack out of field-goal range. After halftime, the Irish started to take control with a 69-yard interception return for a touchdown by Irish cornerback Julian Love giving the Irish a two-touchdown lead. Josh Adams put the game away with a 77-yard touchdown run late in the third quarter.

Josh Adams finished the game with 202 rushing yards, and the Irish as a team finished the game with 318 rushing yards. That was more than twice as many rushing yards that the Wolfpack defense had allowed on the year, as the previous most was 133 rush yards by Furman. This was the sixth straight game the Irish had won by 20 points or more. This was also the first time since 2012 that the Irish had two wins over opponents ranked in the top 15 in a season and the first time since 1989 that they did it in consecutive weeks. It was also the sixth time the Irish ran for 300 yards or more in a game this season.

=== Wake Forest ===
Wake Forest at Notre Dame

Team	1	2	3	4	Total
Demon Deacons	3	7	13	14	37
• No. 5 Fighting Irish	7	24	10	7	48

- Date: November 4, 2017
- Location: Notre Dame Stadium
  South Bend, IN
- Game start: 3:41 p.m. EDT
- Elapsed time: 3 hours and 23 minutes
- Game attendance: 77,622
- Game weather: Temperature: 43 °F (6 °C) • Weather: Light Rain and Chilly • Wind: ESE 10 MPH
- Referee: Jeff Flanagan
- TV announcers (NBC): Mike Tirico, Doug Flutie and Kathryn Tappen (sideline)

On November 4, Notre Dame defeated Wake Forest, 48–37. Though the Irish defense gave up a season-high 580 yards of offense and 37 points, the Irish rushed for 380 yards and racked up 710 total yards of offense, 10 yards shy of tying the school record. This was the seventh time in nine games during the 2017 season that the Irish rushed for over 300 yards.

=== Miami (Florida) ===
Notre Dame at Miami (Florida)

Team	1	2	3	4	Total
No. 3 Fighting Irish	0	0	8	0	8
• No. 7 Hurricanes	14	13	7	7	41

- Date: November 11, 2017
- Location: Hard Rock Stadium
  Miami Gardens, FL
- Game start: 8:16 p.m. EST
- Elapsed time: 3 hours and 17 minutes
- Game attendance: 65,326
- Game weather: Temperature: 78 °F (26 °C) • Weather: Clear • Wind: ENE 13 MPH
- Referee: Jerry Magallanes
- TV announcers (ABC): Chris Fowler, Kirk Herbstreit, Maria Taylor (sideline) and Tom Rinaldi (sideline)

In a highly anticipated matchup, the Fighting Irish of Notre Dame and the Miami Hurricanes met in a crucial game that had major College Football Playoffs implications for the winner. Miami prevailed in a one-sided contest in which the Hurricanes defense shut down the high powered offense of Notre Dame, including Josh Adams. Coming into the game, the Irish had just two turnovers in the previous six games, including no turnovers during that span when quarterback Brandon Wimbush started. They turned it over four times in the contest that was turned into 24 points for the Hurricanes. A pick six by True Freshman Trajan Brady just before halftime gave Miami a commanding 27–0 lead at halftime and Notre Dame never recovered. The Irish had just 109 yards rushing (averaged 324 yards a game coming in), 8 points (averaged 41 points a game) and just 261 total yards of offense (averaged 440). With this loss, the Irish dropped out of the College Football Playoff conversation.

=== Navy ===
Navy at Notre Dame
(Rip Miller Trophy)

Team	1	2	3	4	Total
Midshipmen	0	10	7	0	17
• No. 9 Fighting Irish	3	7	7	7	24

- Date: November 18, 2017
- Location: Notre Dame Stadium
  South Bend, IN
- Game start: 3:41 p.m. EST
- Elapsed time: 2 hours and 54 minutes
- Game attendance: 77,622
- Game weather: Temperature: 41 °F (5 °C) • Weather: Rain • Wind: N 19 MPH
- Referee: Adam Savoie
- TV announcers (NBC): Mike Tirico, Doug Flutie and Kathryn Tappen (sideline)

Notre Dame's match against historic rival Navy proved to be a competitive game for the Irish, with Notre Dame ultimately prevailing 24–17. After Navy took a 17–10 lead on a 12-yard touchdown pass from Zach Abey to Craig Scott in the 3rd quarter, Navy finished the game with a missed field goal, an interception, and a turnover on downs, all in Irish territory. The Irish went ahead in the 4th quarter with a 9-yard touchdown pass from Brandon Wimbush to wide receiver Kevin Stepherson to close out the game. A week after giving up 41 points, the Irish defense held Navy to just 17 points, despite Navy controlling the game clock 42:42 to 17:18.

Josh Adams ran for 106 yards on 18 carries. Josh Adams topped 3,000 career yards and now has the 4th highest single season rushing total in Notre Dame history at 1,337. He needs 101 yards next weekend against Stanford to break the record.

=== Stanford ===
Notre Dame at Stanford
(Legends Trophy)

Team	1	2	3	4	Total
No. 9 Fighting Irish	7	3	10	0	20
• No. 20 Cardinal	7	7	3	21	38

- Date: November 25, 2017
- Location: Stanford Stadium
  Stanford, CA
- Game start: 5:14 p.m. PST
- Elapsed time: 3 hours and 20 minutes
- Game attendance: 47,352
- Game weather: Temperature: 68 °F (20 °C) • Weather: Sunny • Wind: NNE 5 MPH
- Referee: Chris Coyte
- TV announcers (ABC): Chris Fowler, Kirk Herbstreit and Maria Taylor (sideline)

Heading into the 4th quarter, the Irish had a 20–17 lead in a tightly contested game, but back to back turnovers by the Irish turned the game around in a hurry, as the Cardinal took advantage and turned both turnovers into touchdowns. Less than five minutes into the final quarter, the Cardinal had a 38–20 lead. The Irish tried to play catch up for the rest of the quarter, but a turnover on downs and an interception at the goal line halted any comeback bid.

=== LSU (Citrus Bowl) ===
Notre Dame vs LSU
(Citrus Bowl)

Team	1	2	3	4	Total
• No. 14 Fighting Irish	0	3	3	15	21
No. 16 Tigers	0	0	7	10	17

- Date: January 1, 2018
- Location: Camping World Stadium
  Orlando, FL
- Game start: 1:07 p.m. EST
- Elapsed time: 3 hours and 21 minutes
- Game attendance: 57,726
- Game weather: Temperature: 53 °F (12 °C) • Weather: Overcast • Wind: N 17 MPH
- Referee: Cooper Castleberry
- TV announcers (ABC): Mark Jones, Rod Gilmore and Quint Kessenich (sideline)

With the Irish trailing 17–14 with less than 2 minutes to play, quarterback Ian Book connected on a 55-yard touchdown pass to tight end Miles Boykin, giving the Irish an improbable lead late in the game. The Irish defense forced LSU to turn the ball over on downs on the next series, securing Notre Dames first bowl win on New Year's Day since January 1, 1994.

The game started out fast for the Irish, as quarterback Brandon Wimbush connected on a 35-yard pass to receiver Equanimeous St. Brown on the first play of the game to the LSU 40 yard line. The drive later stalled as the Irish were stuffed on 4th and 1. The Irish offense sputtered for most of the first half, punting on five straight possessions. The Irish defense made a key goal line stand in the second quarter, as Notre Dame stopped LSU twice at the Irish 1 yard line, forcing LSU to kick a field goal (which missed), keeping the score tied 0–0. With Brandon Wimbush struggling to move the offense, quarterback Ian Book came in to relieve him. A field goal at the end of the half gave the Irish a 3–0 lead. In the second half, two Irish turnovers gave LSU momentum, including scoring a touchdown to give the Tigers their first lead of the game. In the 4th quarter, LSU extended its lead to 14–6 with a 2-yard touchdown pass from Danny Etling to Derrius Guice on 3rd and goal. On the following possession, Book connected on a 29-yard pass to Miles Boykin on 3rd and 19 to extend the drive. Five plays later, The Irish got their first touchdown of the game with a 6-yard touchdown pass by Book to Michael Young Jr. Running Back Josh Adams ran for a two-point conversion to tie the game. The Tigers retook the lead with a 17-yard field goal with 2:03 left in the game.

The victory gave Notre Dame 10 wins on the year.

=== Scoring summary ===
Scoring summary

Quarter	Time	Drive			Team	Scoring information	Score	
Quarter	Time	Plays	Yards	TOP	Team	Scoring information	ND	LSU
2	0:04	11	51	2:00	ND	46-yard field goal by Justin Yoon	3	0
3	11:37	5	43	2:16	LSU	Derrius Guice 20-yard touchdown reception from Danny Etling, Jack Gonsoulin kick good	3	7
3	2:47	5	18	2:20	ND	49-yard field goal by Justin Yoon	6	7
4	11:13	12	75	6:34	LSU	Derrius Guice 2-yard touchdown reception from Danny Etling, Jack Gonsoulin kick good	6	14
4	7:45	10	75	3:24	ND	Michael Young Jr. 6-yard touchdown reception from Ian Book, 2-point pass good	14	14
4	2:03	12	76	5:46	LSU	17-yard field goal by Jack Gonsoulin	14	17
4	1:28	3	73	0:35	ND	Miles Boykin 55-yard touchdown reception from Ian Book, Justin Yoon kick good	21	17
"TOP" = time of possession. For other American football terms, see Glossary of American football.							21	17

== Personnel ==
2017 Notre Dame Fighting Irish football team roster
Players
Coaches
Offense

Pos.	#	Name	Class
RB	2	Dexter Williams	Jr
WR	3	C.J. Sanders	Jr
QB	4	Montgomery VanGorder	Sr
WR	6	Equanimeous St. Brown	Jr
QB	7	Brandon Wimbush	Jr
WR	9	Keenan Centlivre	Sr
WR	10	Chris Finke	Jr
WR	11	Freddy Canteen	GS
QB	12	Ian Book	So
QB	13	Avery Davis	Fr
QB	14	J.D. Carney	Fr
WR	15	Cameron Smith	GS
RB	16	C.J. Holmes	Fr
QB	17	Nolan Henry	Jr
QB	18	Cameron Ekanayake	Fr
WR	24	Mick Assaf	So
WR	25	Jafar Armstrong	Fr
WR	26	Austin Webster	Sr
WR	29	Kevin Stepherson	So
WR	31	Grant Hammann	Sr
RB	33	Josh Adams	Jr
RB	34	Tony Jones Jr.	So
RB	38	Deon McIntosh	So
TE	47	Chris Bury	Sr
TE	49	Jack Henige	Fr
OL	53	Sam Mustipher	Sr
OL	56	Quenton Nelson	Sr
OL	57	Trevor Ruhland	Jr
OL	61	Colin Grunhard	Fr
OL	62	Logan Plantz	Jr
OL	63	Sam Bush	Sr
OL	67	Jimmy Byrne	Sr
OL	68	Mike McGlinchey	GS
OL	69	Aaron Banks	Fr
OL	70	Hunter Bivin	GS
OL	71	Alex Bars	Sr
OL	72	Robert Hainsey	Fr
OL	74	Liam Eichenberg	So
OL	75	Josh Lugg	Fr
OL	76	Dillan Gibbons	Fr
OL	78	Tommy Kraemer	So
TE	80	Durham Smythe	GS
WR	81	Miles Boykin	Jr
TE	82	Nic Weishar	Sr
WR	83	Chase Claypool	So
TE	84	Cole Kmet	Fr
WR	85	Arion Shinaver	So
TE	86	Alizé Mack	Jr
WR	87	Michael Young	Fr
WR	88	Javon McKinley	So
TE	89	Brock Wright	Fr

Defense

Pos.	#	Name	Class
LB	4	Te'von Coney	Jr
LB	5	Nyles Morgan	Sr
CB	7	Nick Watkins	Sr
CB	8	Donte Vaughn	So
DL	9	Daelin Hayes	So
DB	10	Patrick Pelini	Fr
S	12	Alohi Gilman	So
S	13	Jordan Genmark-Heath	Fr
S	14	Devin Studstill	So
DB	15	John Mahoney	Fr
S	17	Isaiah Robertson	Fr
CB	18	Troy Pride Jr.	So
CB	20	Shaun Crawford	Jr
S	21	Jalen Elliott	So
LB	22	Asmar Bilal	Jr
LB	23	Drue Tranquill	Sr
S	24	Nick Coleman	Jr
CB	27	Julian Love	So
S	28	Nicco Fertitta	Jr
LB	30	Jeremiah Owusu-Koramoah	Fr
CB	31	Temitope Agoro	So
S	32	D.J. Morgan	So
LB	35	David Adams	Fr
LB	37	Robert Regan	Jr
S	38	Christopher Schilling	So
CB	39	Brandon Garcia	Fr
LB	40	Drew White	Fr
DL	41	Kurt Hinish	Fr
DL	42	Julian Okwara	So
CB	43	Brian Ball	Jr
LB	44	Jamir Jones	So
LB	45	Jonathan Jones	So
LB	46	Jimmy Thompson	Jr
DL	47	Kofi Wardlow	Fr
LB	48	Greer Martini	Sr
LB	49	Brandon Hutson	Jr
LB	51	Devyn Spruell	Jr
DL	53	Khalid Kareem	So
DL	54	Lincoln Feist	Jr
DL	55	Jonathan Bonner	Sr
DL	58	Elijah Taylor	Jr
LB	59	Kier Murphy	Jr
DL	64	Ryan Kilander	Sr
DL	77	Brandon Tiassum	Jr
DL	91	Adetokunbo Ogundeji	So
DL	92	Jonathon MacCollister	Fr
DL	93	Jay Hayes	Sr
DL	94	Darnell Ewell	Fr
DL	95	Myron Tagovailoa-Amosa	Fr
DL	96	Pete Mokwuah	Sr
DL	97	Micah Dew-Treadway	Jr
DL	98	Andrew Trumbetti	Sr
DL	99	Jerry Tillery	Jr

Special teams

Pos.	#	Name	Class
K	19	Justin Yoon	Jr
K	29	Sam Kohler	Sr
K	39	Jonathan Doerer	Fr
P	42	Jeff Riney	Jr
LS	46	Matt Bushland	So
LS	54	John Shannon	So
P	85	Tyler Newsome	Sr

Head coach

- Brian Kelly

Coordinators/assistant coaches

- Mike Elston – Assistant Head Coach/Defensive Line
- Mike Elko – Defensive Coordinator
- Chip Long – Offensive Coordinator
- Autry Denson – Running Backs
- Harry Hiestand – Offensive Line
- Todd Lyght – Defensive Backs Coach
- Brian Polian – Recruiting Coordinator/Special Teams Coordinator
- Clark Lea – Linebackers
- Del Alexander – Wide Receivers
- Tom Rees – Quarterbacks
- Clay Bignell – Graduate Assistant (Defense)
- Harland Bower – Graduate Assistant (Defense)
- Aaron Coeling – Graduate Assistant (Offense)
- Pryce Tracy – Offensive Analyst
- Jeff Quinn – Senior Offensive Analyst
- Tyler Santucci – Defensive Analyst
- Tyler Plantz – Special Teams Analyst
- Beth Rex – Director of Football Administration
- Joy McCausland – Senior Staff Assistant
- Julie DeBuysser – Senior Staff Assistant-Assistant Coaches
- Matt Balis – Director of Football Performance
- Jake Flint – Co-Director Football Strength & Conditioning
- David Ballou – Co-Director Football Strength and Conditioning
- David Grimes – Assistant Strength and Conditioning Coach
- Dale Jones – Assistant Strength and Conditioning Coach
- Tim Collins – Video Coordinator
- Ryan Sehrer – Assistant Video Coordinator
- Ryan Grooms – Head Football Equipment Manager
- Adam Myers – Assistant Football Equipment Manager
- Rob Hunt – Head Football Athletic Trainer
- Mike Bean – Associate Athletic Trainer
- Steve Smith – Assistant Athletic Trainer
- Chad Klunder – Associate Athletic Director for Football Operations
- Jason Michelson – Assistant Director of Football Operations
- Olivia Mitchell – Coordinator of Football Operations
- David Peloquin – Director of Player Personnel
- Aaryn Kearney – Coordinator of Recruiting Operations
- Jasmine Johnson – Coordinator of On-Campus Recruiting
- Dr. Matt Leiszler – Team Physician
- Dr. Brian Ratigan – Orthopedic Surgeon
- Dr. Chris Balint – Orthopedic Surgeon
- Dr. Jerry Hofferth – Chiropractor
- Kari Oliver – Sports Nutrition Associate
- Ron Powlus – Director of Player Development

Legend

- (C) Team captain
- (S) Suspended
- (I) Ineligible
- Injured
- Redshirt

Roster

=== Recruiting ===
Back	B	Center	C	Cornerback	CB	Defensive back	DB
Defensive end	DE	Defensive lineman	DL	Defensive tackle	DT	End	E
Fullback	FB	Guard	G	Halfback	HB	Kicker	K
Kickoff returner	KR	Offensive tackle	OT	Offensive lineman	OL	Linebacker	LB
Long snapper	LS	Punter	P	Punt returner	PR	Quarterback	QB
Running back	RB	Safety	S	Tight end	TE	Wide receiver	WR

The Fighting Irish signed a total of 21 recruits.

College recruiting (2017)
Name	Hometown	School	Height	Weight	Commit date
Dillan Gibbons; OT	Clearwater, Florida	Clearwater Central Catholic HS	6 ft 4 in (1.93 m)	311 lb (141 kg)	Apr 4, 2015
Dillan Gibbons; OT	Recruit ratings: Scout: Rivals: 247Sports: ESPN:				
Brock Wright; TE	Cypress, Texas	Cy-Fair HS	6 ft 5 in (1.96 m)	245 lb (111 kg)	Jun 26, 2015
Brock Wright; TE	Recruit ratings: Scout: Rivals: 247Sports: ESPN:				
Joshua Lugg; OT	Wexford, Pennsylvania	North Allegheny HS	6 ft 7 in (2.01 m)	293 lb (133 kg)	Aug 14, 2015
Joshua Lugg; OT	Recruit ratings: Scout: Rivals: 247Sports: ESPN:				
Cole Kmet; TE	Arlington Heights, Illinois	St. Viator HS	6 ft 5 in (1.96 m)	230 lb (100 kg)	Oct 2, 2015
Cole Kmet; TE	Recruit ratings: Scout: Rivals: 247Sports: ESPN:				
Avery Davis; QB	Cedar Hill, Texas	Cedar Hill HS	5 ft 11 in (1.80 m)	192 lb (87 kg)	Mar 19, 2016
Avery Davis; QB	Recruit ratings: Scout: Rivals: 247Sports: ESPN:				
David Adams; LB	Pittsburgh, Pennsylvania	Central Catholic HS	6 ft 2 in (1.88 m)	225 lb (102 kg)	Mar 20, 2016
David Adams; LB	Recruit ratings: Scout: Rivals: 247Sports: ESPN:				
Kurt Hinish; DT	Pittsburgh, Pennsylvania	Central Catholic HS	6 ft 2 in (1.88 m)	283 lb (128 kg)	Mar 21, 2016
Kurt Hinish; DT	Recruit ratings: Scout: Rivals: 247Sports: ESPN:				
Drew White; LB	Fort Lauderdale, Florida	St. Thomas Aquinas HS	6 ft 1 in (1.85 m)	225 lb (102 kg)	Mar 21, 2016
Drew White; LB	Recruit ratings: Scout: Rivals: 247Sports: ESPN:				
Isaiah Robertson; S	Naperville, Illinois	Neuqua Valley HS	6 ft 3 in (1.91 m)	190 lb (86 kg)	Apr 15, 2016
Isaiah Robertson; S	Recruit ratings: Scout: Rivals: 247Sports: ESPN:				
Jonathon MacCollister; DE	Orlando, Florida	Bishop Moore HS	6 ft 4 in (1.93 m)	238 lb (108 kg)	Jun 17, 2016
Jonathon MacCollister; DE	Recruit ratings: Scout: Rivals: 247Sports: ESPN:				
CJ Holmes; RB	Cheshire, Connecticut	Cheshire Academy	6 ft 0 in (1.83 m)	200 lb (91 kg)	Jul 8, 2016
CJ Holmes; RB	Recruit ratings: Scout: Rivals: 247Sports: ESPN:				
Robert Hainsey; OG	Monroeville, Pennsylvania	IMG Academy	6 ft 5 in (1.96 m)	276 lb (125 kg)	Jul 10, 2016
Robert Hainsey; OG	Recruit ratings: Scout: Rivals: 247Sports: ESPN:				
Darnell Ewell; DT	Norfolk, Virginia	Lake Taylor HS	6 ft 4 in (1.93 m)	295 lb (134 kg)	Jul 15, 2016
Darnell Ewell; DT	Recruit ratings: Scout: Rivals: 247Sports: ESPN:				
Michael Young Jr. WR	Destrehan, Louisiana	Destrehan HS	5 ft 11 in (1.80 m)	175 lb (79 kg)	Jul 20, 2016
Michael Young Jr. WR	Recruit ratings: Scout: Rivals: 247Sports: ESPN:				
Aaron Banks; OT	El Cerrito, California	El Cerrito HS	6 ft 7 in (2.01 m)	315 lb (143 kg)	Dec 9, 2016
Aaron Banks; OT	Recruit ratings: Scout: Rivals: 247Sports: ESPN:				
Jordan Genmark Heath; S	San Diego, California	Cathedral Catholic HS	6 ft 2 in (1.88 m)	205 lb (93 kg)	Jan 26, 2017
Jordan Genmark Heath; S	Recruit ratings: Scout: Rivals: 247Sports: ESPN:				
Jonathan Doerer; K	Charlotte, North Carolina	South Mecklenburg HS	6 ft 3 in (1.91 m)	188 lb (85 kg)	Jan 29, 2017
Jonathan Doerer; K	Recruit ratings: Scout: Rivals: 247Sports: ESPN:				
Jafar Armstrong; WR	Shawnee Mission, Kansas	Bishop Miege HS	6 ft 1 in (1.85 m)	205 lb (93 kg)	Jan 29, 2017
Jafar Armstrong; WR	Recruit ratings: Scout: Rivals: 247Sports: ESPN:				
Jeremiah Owusu-Koramoah; S	Hampton, Virginia	Bethel HS	6 ft 2 in (1.88 m)	197 lb (89 kg)	Feb 1, 2017
Jeremiah Owusu-Koramoah; S	Recruit ratings: Scout: Rivals: 247Sports: ESPN:				
Myron Tagovailoa-Amosa; DE	Kapolei, Hawaii	Kapolei HS	6 ft 4 in (1.93 m)	270 lb (120 kg)	Feb 1, 2017
Myron Tagovailoa-Amosa; DE	Recruit ratings: Scout: Rivals: 247Sports: ESPN:				
Kofi Wardlow; DE	Washington, D.C.	St. John's College HS	6 ft 4 in (1.93 m)	270 lb (120 kg)	Feb 1, 2017
Kofi Wardlow; DE	Recruit ratings: Scout: Rivals: 247Sports: ESPN:				
Overall recruit ranking:
Note: In many cases, Scout, Rivals, 247Sports, On3, and ESPN may conflict in their listings of height and weight.; In these cases, the average was taken. ESPN grades are on a 100-point scale.; Sources: "Notre Dame Football Commitments". Rivals.; "2017 Notre Dame Football Commits". Scout.; "ESPN". ESPN.; "Scout.com Team Recruiting Rankings". Scout.; "2017 Team Ranking". Rivals.com.

== Statistics ==
Passing

1. Brandon Wimbush - 136 of 175 (49.5%) for 1,870 yards, 16 touchdowns, 6 interceptions, 121.4 passer rating
2. Ian Book - 46 of 75 (61.3%) for 456 yards, 4 touchdowns, 4 interceptions, 119.3 passer rating

Rushing

1. Josh Adams - 1,430 yards on 206 carries, 6.9-yard average, 9 touchdowns
2. Brandon Wimbush, 803 yards on 141 carries, 5.7-yard average, 14 touchdowns
3. Deon McIntosh - 368 yards on 65 carries, 5.7-yard average, 5 touchdowns
4. Dexter Williams - 360 yards on 39 carries, 9.2-yard average, 4 touchdowns
5. Tony Jones Jr. - 232 yards on 44 carries, 5.3-yard average, 3 touchdowns
6. Ian Book - 207 yards on 37 carries, 5.6-yard average, 0 touchdowns

Receptions

1. Equanimeous St. Brown (WR) - 33 receptions for 515 yards, 15.6-yard average, 4 touchdowns
2. Chase Claypool (WR) - 29 receptions for 402 yards, 13.9-yard average, 2 touchdowns
3. Kevin Stepherson (WR) - 19 receptions for 359 yards, 18.9-yard average, 5 touchdowns
4. Miles Boykin (WR) - 12 receptions for 253 yards, 21.1-yard average, 2 touchdowns
5. Durham Smythe (TE) - 15 receptions for 244 yards, 16.3-yard average, 1 touchdown
6. Alize Mack (TE) - 19 receptions for 166 yards, 8.7-yard average, 1 touchdown
7. Chris Finke (WR) - 6 receptions for 102 yards, 17.0-yard average, 0 touchdown
8. Josh Adams - 13 receptions for 101 yards, 7.8-yard average, 0 touchdowns

Scoring

1. Justin Yoon (K) - 97 points, 55 of 55 PAT, 14 of 18 field goals
2. Brandon Wimbush (QB) - 86 points, 14 touchdowns, 1 two-point conversion
3. Josh Adams (RB) - 56 points, 9 touchdowns, 1 two-point conversion
4. Kevin Stepherson (WR) - 30 points, 5 touchdowns
5. Deon McIntosh (RB) - 30 points, 5 touchdowns
6. Dexter Williams (RB) - 30 points, 5 touchdowns
7. Equanimeous St. Brown (WR) - 24 points, 4 touchdowns

Tackles

1. Te'von Coney (LB) - 116 total tackles, 56 solo tackles, 12.5 tackles for loss, 3.0 sacks
2. Nyles Morgan (LB) - 92 total tackles, 35 solo tackles, 7.0 tackles for loss, 1.5 sacks
3. Drue Tranquill (LB) - 85 total tackles, 44 solo tackles, 10.5 tackles for loss, 1.5 sacks
4. Greer Martini (LB) - 75 total tackles, 39 solo tackles, 3.0 tackles for loss, 0 sacks
5. Julian Love (CB) - 68 total tackles, 45 solo tackles, 1.0 tackles for loss, 0 sacks
6. Jerry Tillery (DL) - 56 total tackles, 25 tackles for loss, 9.0 tackles for loss, 4.5 sacks

== Awards and honors ==
Notre Dame's offensive line led the way for the third best rushing offense in the country at 6.7 yards per carry and won the Joe Moore Award as the best offensive line in college football. Two of the offensive linemen, tackle Mike McGlinchey and guard Quenton Nelson, were consensus first-team picks on the 2017 All-America college football team. Nelson was also voted by his teammates as the team's most valuable player; he was the first offensive lineman to receive the honor since 1975.

Several Notre Dame players were either finalists or semi-finalists for national awards: Nelson, finalist for the Outland Trophy; Josh Adams, semi-finalist for the Doak Walker Award; Drue Tranquill, finalist for the Wuerffel Trophy; and Montgomery VanGorder, finalist for the Peter Mortell Award.
