= Brandon Wimbush =

American football player (born 1996)

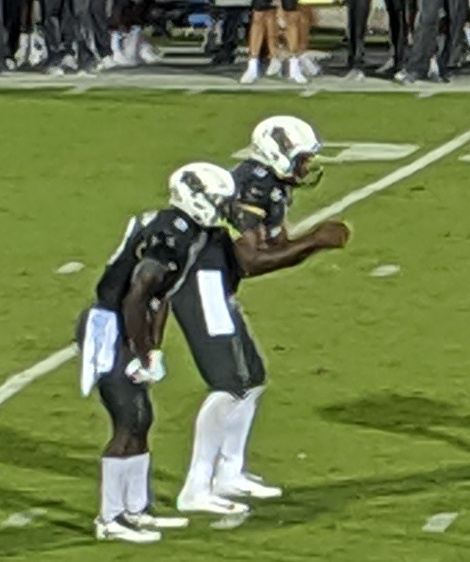
- Wimbush (right) with UCF in 2019

No. 3
- Position: Quarterback

Personal information
- Born: December 17, 1996 (age 29); Teaneck, New Jersey, U.S.
- Listed height: 6 ft 1 in (1.85 m)
- Listed weight: 222 lb (101 kg)

Career information
- High school: St. Peter's Prep (NJ)
- College: Notre Dame (2015–2018); UCF (2019)

Brandon Michael Wimbush (born December 17, 1996) is an American business executive and former college football quarterback who played for the Notre Dame Fighting Irish and UCF Knights. He co-founded the NIL company MOGL in 2020, and is currently the chief of staff for Real American Freestyle.

== Early life ==
Wimbush, a resident of Teaneck, New Jersey, attended St. Peter's Preparatory School in Jersey City. As a senior, he was named the Gatorade Football Player of the Year for New Jersey after he completed 192 of 265 passes for 3,187 yards, 37 touchdowns and four interceptions, while rushing for an additional 723 yards and 5 more touchdowns. Wimbush was considered one of the top quarterback recruits in his class and committed to the University of Notre Dame to play college football.

== College career ==
=== Notre Dame ===
==== 2015–2016 ====
As a freshman in 2015, Wimbush appeared in two games as a backup to DeShone Kizer. In 2016, he took a redshirt season.

==== 2017 ====
With Kizer in the NFL, Wimbush took over as Notre Dame's starting quarterback in 2017 as a redshirt sophomore. In his first start for the Fighting Irish, Wimbush threw for 184 yards, two passing touchdowns, and an interception against Temple. He also gained 106 yards on the ground and had a rushing touchdown in the game. Two weeks later, he had 207 rushing yards and four rushing touchdowns to go along with 96 passing yards in a 49–20 victory over Boston College. Wimbush had 110 rushing yards and a career-high 280 passing yards against Wake Forest on November 4. In Notre Dame's bowl game against LSU, Wimbush was benched in the second quarter in favor of backup Ian Book, who led Notre Dame to a come-from-behind victory, 21–17.

==== 2018 ====
Wimbush again started for Notre Dame in the 2018 season. Although, after a shaky start to the beginning of the season, backup Ian Book took over in Week 4. Wimbush relieved an injured Ian Book against Florida State later in the season in what would be his last game for Notre Dame.

Pre-draft measurables
Height	Weight
6 ft 0 5/8 in (1.84 m)	222 lb (101 kg)
Values from Pro Day

=== College statistics ===
Season	Team	Games		Passing									Rushing				
Season	Team	GP	GS	Cmp	Att	Pct	Yds	Avg	Lng	TD	Int	Rtg	Att	Yds	Avg	Lng	TD
2015	Notre Dame	2	0	3	5	60.0	17	3.4	9	0	0	88.6	7	96	13.7	79	1
2016	Notre Dame	0	0	Redshirted													
2017	Notre Dame	12	12	136	275	49.5	1,870	6.8	83	16	6	121.4	140	804	5.7	49	14
2018	Notre Dame	6	4	54	102	52.9	719	7.0	—	4	6	113.3	68	356	3.8	—	1
2019	UCF	6	1	13	24	54.2	167	7.0	30	2	0	140.1	11	48	4.4	32	0
Career		26	17	206	406	50.7	2,623	6.5	83	22	12	120.1	226	1,204	5.3	49	16

== Professional career ==
Wimbush co-founded MOGL in 2020, which helps businesses partner with college athletes around NIL deals. In 2025, he appeared on the Forbes 30 Under 30 list.

He became the chief of staff for Real American Freestyle in May 2025, a wrestling league co-founded by Hulk Hogan.
