= Ian Book =

American football player (born 1998)

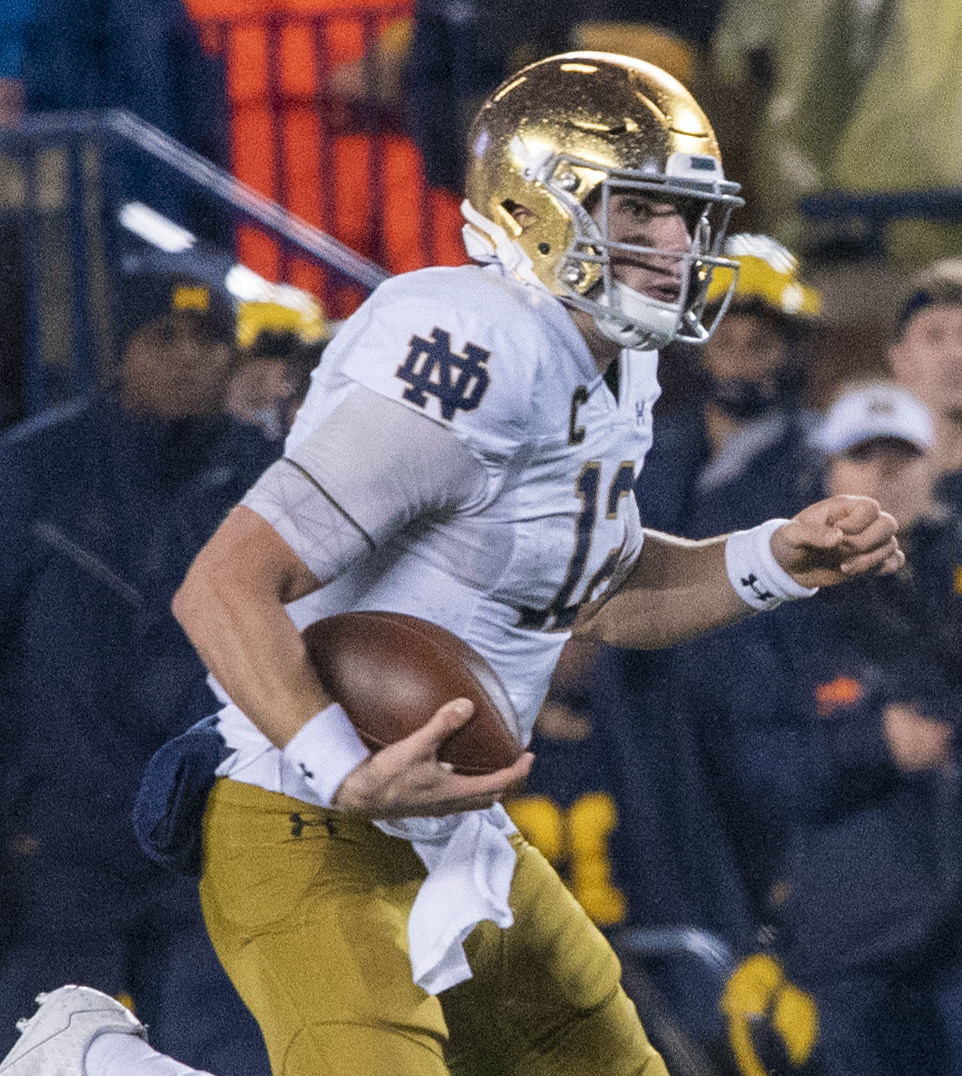
- Book with the Notre Dame Fighting Irish in 2019

Profile
- Position: Quarterback

Personal information
- Born: March 30, 1998 (age 28); El Dorado Hills, California, U.S.
- Listed height: 6 ft 0 in (1.83 m)
- Listed weight: 212 lb (96 kg)

Career information
- High school: Oak Ridge (El Dorado Hills)
- College: Notre Dame (2016–2020)
- NFL draft: 2021: 4th round, 133rd overall pick

Career history
- New Orleans Saints (2021); Philadelphia Eagles (2022); New England Patriots (2023)*; Kansas City Chiefs (2024)*; Philadelphia Eagles (2024)
- * Offseason or practice squad member only

Awards and highlights
- Super Bowl champion (LIX); Third-team All-ACC (2020)

Career NFL statistics
- Passing attempts: 20
- Passing completions: 12
- Completion percentage: 60.0%
- TD–INT: 0–2
- Passing yards: 135
- Passer rating: 40.6
- Stats at Pro Football Reference

Ian Michael Book (born March 30, 1998) is an American professional football quarterback. He played college football for the Notre Dame Fighting Irish, where he is the winningest quarterback in school history, going 30–5 as a starter. After Notre Dame, Book was selected by the New Orleans Saints in the fourth round of the 2021 NFL draft.

== Early life ==
Book was born on March 30, 1998, in El Dorado Hills, California, and played high school football at Oak Ridge High School. He originally committed to Washington State but flipped his commitment to Notre Dame.

== College career ==
Book took a redshirt his freshman year in 2016 in order to preserve a year of eligibility. He sat behind starters Malik Zaire and DeShone Kizer in addition to primary backup Brandon Wimbush.

Book sat behind Wimbush throughout the 2017 season, but on October 7, 2017, he started for an injured Wimbush against the North Carolina Tar Heels, propelling the Irish to a 33–10 victory. During the 2018 Citrus Bowl, Book came off the bench and led the Irish to a 21–17 victory over the LSU Tigers.

After a pair of slim home victories over unranked opponents the Ball State Cardinals and the Vanderbilt Commodores in 2018, Book was chosen as the starter over Wimbush for a road game against the Wake Forest Demon Deacons. The result was a 56–27 Notre Dame victory, with Book throwing for 325 yards and two touchdowns, and running for three more. Against the #7 ranked Stanford Cardinal the next week, Book threw for 278 yards and four touchdowns in a 38–17 rout. The Irish continued to move up the rankings under Book, and in week 10, Book threw for two touchdown passes and ran 23 yards for a score in the closing minutes to lead No. 3 Notre Dame to a close 31–21 victory over the Northwestern Wildcats. Book helped the Irish to finish the regular season 12–0 and earn its first College Football Playoff berth, although the Irish were defeated by the eventual national champion the Clemson Tigers in the 2018 Cotton Bowl Classic, 30–3.

On September 14, 2019, Book threw for 360 yards and five touchdowns, and also had one rushing touchdown in a 66–14 win over the New Mexico Lobos. He contributed to the most points scored in a home opener at Notre Dame since 1932. On October 5, 2019, Book threw five touchdowns in the first half against the Bowling Green Falcons, becoming the first player in Notre Dame history to have five scores in one half. On November 9, 2019, Book threw four touchdown passes in a win against the Duke Blue Devils. On November 16, 2019, Book threw for 284 yards and five touchdowns against the Navy Midshipmen, making him the first Notre Dame quarterback in history to have five touchdown passes in three games for one season.

On December 29, 2019, Book announced via Instagram that he would be returning to Notre Dame for a fifth season as a redshirt senior. On December 5, 2020, Book passed Tom Clements, Ron Powlus, and Brady Quinn for most wins as a quarterback in Notre Dame football history with 30 total wins as a starter. His 72 touchdown passes are second all-time in program history. He finished 9th in the Heisman Trophy voting. He helped lead Notre Dame to an appearance in the College Football Playoff, where they eventually lost to the Alabama Crimson Tide in the Semifinal Round in the Rose Bowl.

Book holds school records for wins as a starting QB (30), single-game yards per completion (24.0 against New Mexico in 2019), single-season completion percentage (68.2% in 2018), consecutive pass attempts without an interception (266 in 2020), and lowest interception percentage in a career (1.75%).

== Professional career ==
Pre-draft measurables
Height	Weight	Arm length	Hand span	40-yard dash	10-yard split	20-yard split	20-yard shuttle	Three-cone drill	Vertical jump	Broad jump
6 ft 0 in (1.83 m)	211 lb (96 kg)	31 3/8 in (0.80 m)	9 7/8 in (0.25 m)	4.65 s	1.71 s	2.65 s	4.20 s	7.00 s	32.5 in (0.83 m)	9 ft 7 in (2.92 m)
All values from Pro Day

=== New Orleans Saints ===
Book was selected by the New Orleans Saints in the fourth round with the 133rd overall pick in the 2021 NFL draft. He signed his four-year rookie contract with New Orleans on June 8, 2021. On December 23, 2021, he was named that week's starting quarterback after Taysom Hill and Trevor Siemian were placed on the reserve/COVID-19 list. This made him the fourth quarterback the Saints named as a starter during an injury-riddled season. In the game, his NFL debut and first career start, Book was 12–20 for 135 yards and two interceptions. The Saints lost the game to the Miami Dolphins, 20–3. On August 30, 2022, Book was waived by the Saints.

=== Philadelphia Eagles (first stint) ===
On August 31, 2022, Book was claimed off waivers by the Philadelphia Eagles. He was waived on August 29, 2023.

=== New England Patriots ===
On September 13, 2023, Book signed with the practice squad of the New England Patriots. He was released five days later on September 18.

=== Kansas City Chiefs ===
On January 10, 2024, Book signed a reserve/future contract with the Kansas City Chiefs. Book was waived by the Chiefs on August 26.

=== Philadelphia Eagles (second stint) ===
On December 26, 2024, with starter Jalen Hurts and backup Kenny Pickett dealing with injuries, the Philadelphia Eagles signed Book to their practice squad. Two days later, the Eagles signed him to their active roster. Book was waived by the Eagles on January 7, 2025, and re-signed to the practice squad two days later. Book earned a Super Bowl ring as part of the team that defeated the Kansas City Chiefs in Super Bowl LIX.

== Career statistics ==
=== NFL ===
Year	Team	Games			Passing									Rushing					Sacks		Fumbles	
Year	Team	GP	GS	Record	Cmp	Att	Pct	Yds	Y/A	Lng	TD	Int	Rtg	Att	Yds	Avg	Lng	TD	Sck	SckY	Fum	Lost
2021	NO	1	1	0–1	12	20	60.0	135	6.8	56	0	2	40.6	3	6	2.0	6	0	8	54	0	0
2022	PHI	0	0	—	DNP																	
2024	PHI	0	0	—	DNP																	
Career		1	1	0−1	12	20	60.0	135	8.8	56	0	2	40.6	3	6	2.0	0	0	8	54	0	0

=== College ===
Season	Team	Games			Passing								Rushing			
Season	Team	GP	GS	Record	Comp	Att	Pct	Yards	Avg	TD	Int	Rate	Att	Yards	Avg	TD
2016	Notre Dame	Redshirt (redshirt)														
2017	Notre Dame	10	1	1−0	46	75	61.3	456	6.1	4	4	119.3	38	206	5.4	0
2018	Notre Dame	12	9	8−1	214	314	68.2	2,628	8.4	19	7	154.0	95	280	2.9	4
2019	Notre Dame	13	13	11−2	240	399	60.2	3,034	7.6	34	6	149.1	112	546	4.9	4
2020	Notre Dame	12	12	10−2	228	353	64.6	2,830	8.0	15	3	144.3	116	485	4.2	9
Career		47	35	30−5	728	1,141	63.8	8,948	7.8	72	20	147.0	361	1,517	4.2	17

== Personal life ==
Book married his wife, Kendall Moore, in June 2024.
