= Nyles Morgan =

American football player (born 1996)

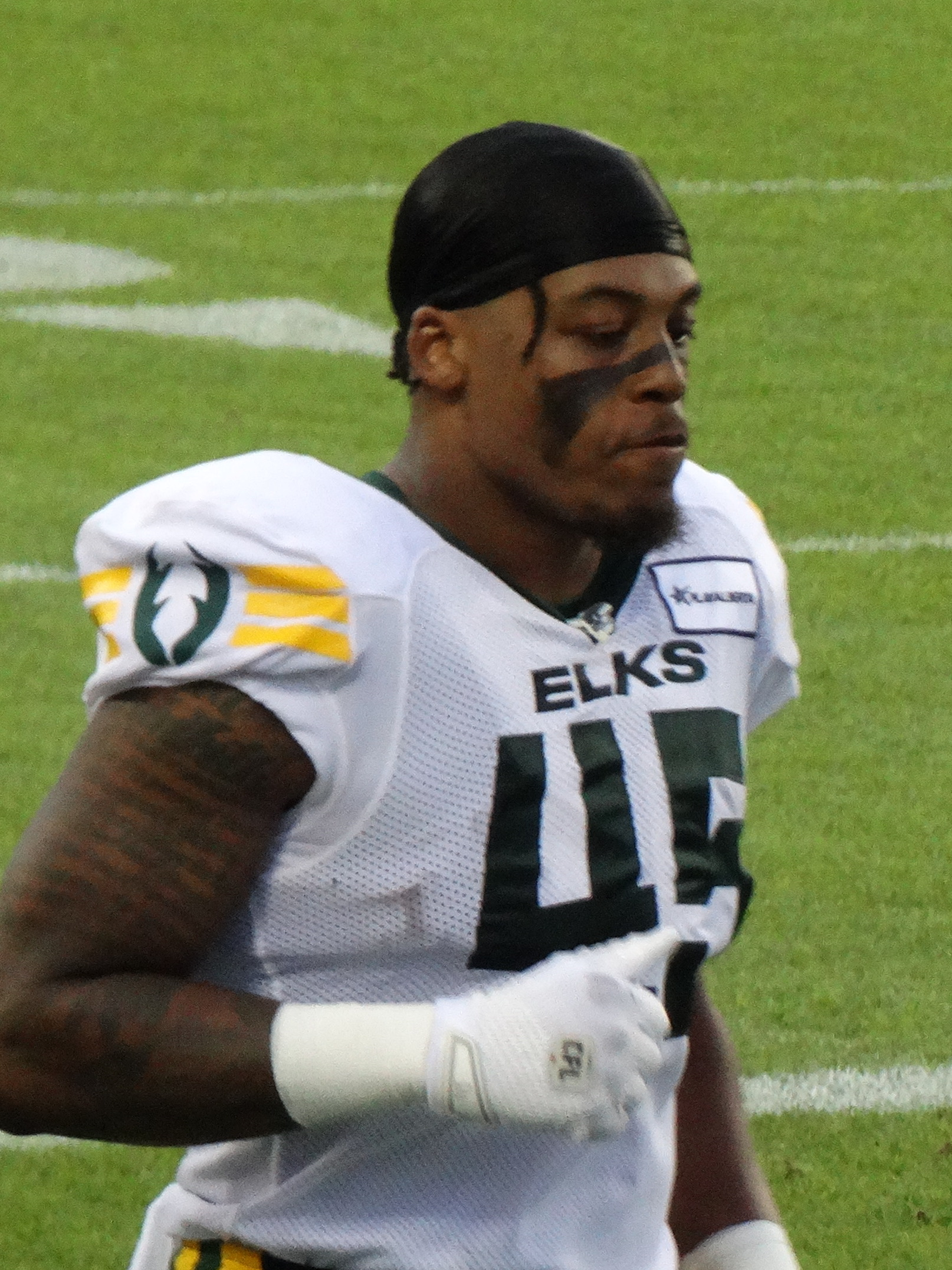
- Morgan with the Edmonton Elks in 2024

Ottawa Redblacks
- Position: Linebacker
- Roster status: Active
- CFL status: American

Personal information
- Born: August 16, 1996 (age 30); Chicago, Illinois, U.S.
- Listed height: 6 ft 1 in (1.85 m)
- Listed weight: 230 lb (104 kg)

Career information
- High school: Crete-Monee (Crete, IL)
- College: Notre Dame (2014–2017)
- NFL draft: 2018: undrafted

Career history
- 2018: Chicago Bears*
- 2018: Tennessee Titans*
- 2019: Arizona Hotshots
- 2020: Seattle Sea Dragons
- 2021–2025: Edmonton Elks
- 2026–present: Ottawa Redblacks
- * Offseason or practice squad member only
- Stats at CFL.ca

Nyles Thomas Morgan (born August 16, 1996) is an American professional football linebacker for the Ottawa Redblacks of the Canadian Football League (CFL). He played college football for the Notre Dame Fighting Irish. He has also been a member of the Tennessee Titans and Chicago Bears of the National Football League (NFL), the Arizona Hotshots of the Alliance of American Football (AAF), the Seattle Sea Dragons of the XFL, and the Edmonton Elks of the CFL.

== Early life ==
Morgan played high school football at Crete-Monee High School in Crete, Illinois. He recorded 107 tackles, four sacks, two interceptions, three forced fumbles and two fumble recoveries in 2012. In 2013, he totaled 115 tackles, four sacks, two forced fumbles and one interception (which was returned for a touchdown), earning first-team USA Today All-American honors. He also played in the U.S. Army All-American bowl.

== College career ==
Morgan played college football at Notre Dame from 2014 to 2017. He played in 12 games, starting four, as a true freshman in 2014, totaling 47 tackles, half a sack, and one pass breakup, garnering freshman All-American recognition. He appeared in 13 games in 2015 and made 17 tackles. Morgan started 12 games in 2016, accumulating 94 tackles, four sacks, two pass breakups and one fumble recovery. He played in 12 games in 2017, recording 91 tackles and 1.5 sacks. He was also a team captain in 2017, but was stripped of his captaincy for the 2018 Citrus Bowl due to an "internal team matter".

== Professional career ==
Pre-draft measurables
Height	Weight	Arm length	Hand span	Wingspan	40-yard dash	10-yard split	20-yard split	20-yard shuttle	Three-cone drill	Vertical jump	Broad jump
6 ft 0 7/8 in (1.85 m)	230 lb (104 kg)	33 in (0.84 m)	9 1/4 in (0.23 m)	6 ft 8 1/4 in (2.04 m)	4.76 s	1.63 s	2.76 s	4.38 s	7.21 s	32.0 in (0.81 m)	9 ft 6 in (2.90 m)
All values from Pro Day

=== Chicago Bears ===
Morgan signed with the Chicago Bears of the National Football League (NFL) on May 11, 2018 after going undrafted in the 2018 NFL draft. He was released on May 14, 2018.

=== Tennessee Titans ===
Morgan was signed by the Tennessee Titans of the NFL on August 21, 2018. He played in two preseason games for the Titans, posting five solo tackles and three assisted tackles. He was released on September 1, 2018.

=== Arizona Hotshots ===
Morgan played in eight games, starting three, for the Arizona Hotshots of the Alliance of American Football (AAF) in 2019, recording 58 tackles and one forced fumble.

=== Seattle Sea Dragons ===
Morgan appeared in five games for the Seattle Sea Dragons of the XFL in 2020, totaling 18 tackles and half of a sack.

=== Edmonton Elks ===
Morgan signed with the Edmonton Elks of the Canadian Football League (CFL) on July 1, 2021. He was placed on injured reserve on November 4, and activated from injured reserve on November 12, 2021. Overall, he dressed in 13 games, all starts, for the Elks in 2021, accumulating 66 tackles on defense, six special teams tackles, one sack and one forced fumble.

Morgan was placed on injured reserve several times during the 2022 season. Overall, he dressed in six games, all starts, in 2022, recording 41 tackles on defense, one special teams tackle and one forced fumble.

Morgan signed a two-year extension with the Elks on January 26, 2023. He was placed on injured reserve twice in 2023. He dressed in 15 games, all starts, during the 2023 season, totaling 107 tackles on defense, four sacks and one interception. He finished second in the league in tackles despite missing three games. Morgan also became only the third player in team history to record over 100 tackles in a season.

=== Ottawa Redblacks ===
On December 27, 2025, it was announced that Morgan had been traded to the Ottawa Redblacks in exchange for a series of 2026 CFL draft picks.
