= Danny Etling =

American football player and coach (born 1994)

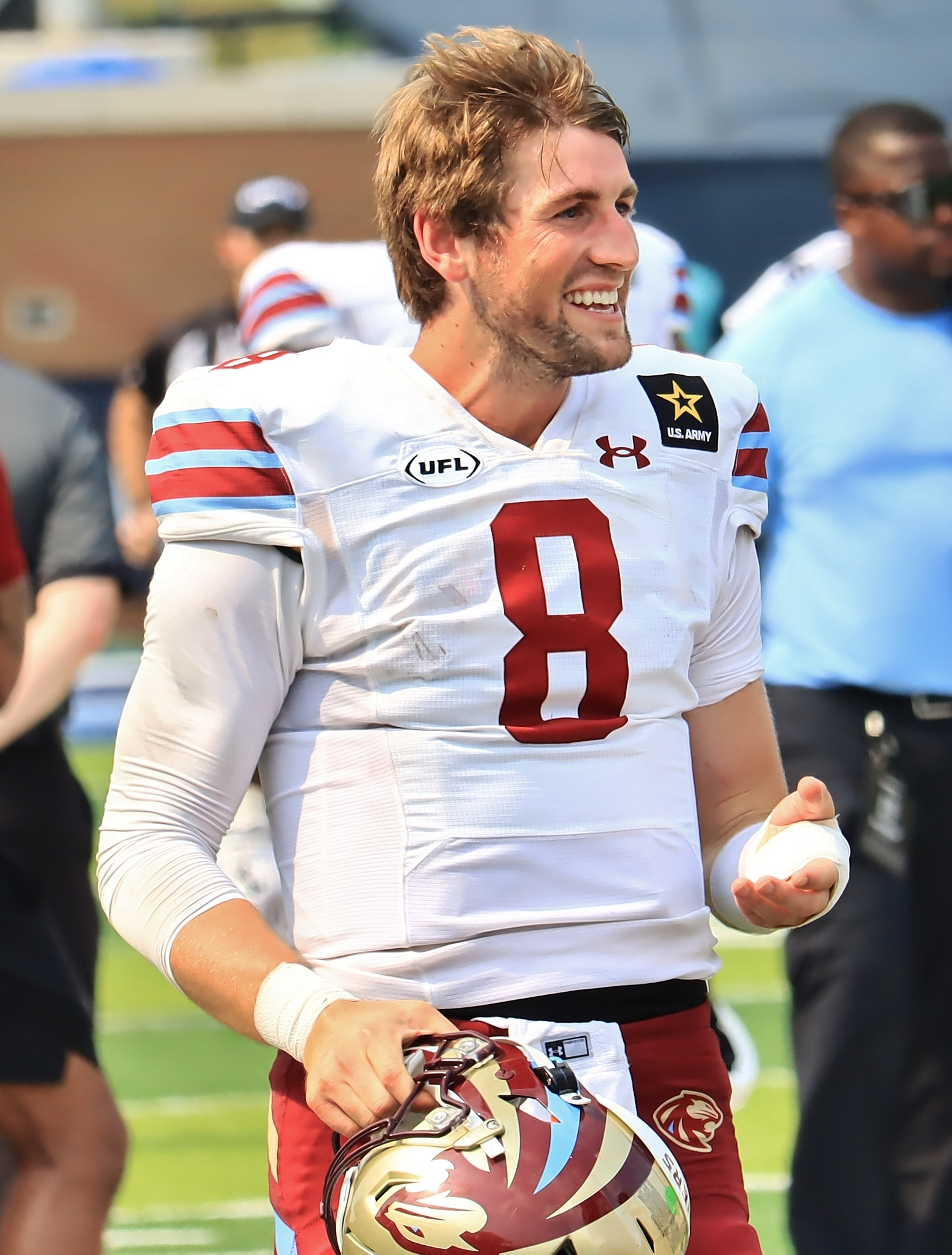
- Etling with the Michigan Panthers in 2024

Washington Commanders
- Title: Assistant quarterbacks coach

Personal information
- Born: July 22, 1994 (age 32); Terre Haute, Indiana, U.S.
- Listed height: 6 ft 3 in (1.91 m)
- Listed weight: 220 lb (100 kg)

Career information
- Position: Quarterback
- High school: Terre Haute South Vigo
- College: Purdue (2013–2014); LSU (2015–2017)
- NFL draft: 2018: 7th round, 219th overall pick

Career history

Playing
- New England Patriots (2018–2019)*; Atlanta Falcons (2019); Seattle Seahawks (2020–2021)*; Minnesota Vikings (2021)*; BC Lions (2021)*; Seattle Seahawks (2021)*; Denver Broncos (2021)*; Green Bay Packers (2021)*; Jacksonville Jaguars (2021)*; Green Bay Packers (2022–2023)*; Michigan Panthers (2024–2025)
- * Offseason or practice squad member only

Coaching
- Washington Commanders (2026–present) Assistant quarterbacks coach

Awards and highlights
- Super Bowl champion (LIII)
- Stats at Pro Football Reference

Daniel Patrick Etling (born July 22, 1994) is an American professional football coach and former quarterback who is the assistant quarterbacks coach for the Washington Commanders of the National Football League (NFL). Etling played college football for the Purdue Boilermakers and LSU Tigers. He was selected by the New England Patriots in the seventh round of the 2018 NFL draft and also played for the Atlanta Falcons, Seattle Seahawks, Minnesota Vikings, BC Lions, Denver Broncos, Green Bay Packers, Jacksonville Jaguars, and Michigan Panthers.

== Early life ==
Etling quarterbacked the Terre Haute South Vigo High School football team in Terre Haute, Indiana. He was poised for a big senior season after a disappointing junior year where the Braves started 3–0 before losing their final seven games. For his senior year, Etling threw for 1,505 yards and 11 touchdowns.

He is an Eagle Scout.

As a junior, Etling committed to Purdue University on April 17, 2012. He also received football scholarship offers from Colorado and Iowa. When Purdue head coach Danny Hope was fired, Etling stayed verbally committed to Purdue. Once Darrell Hazell was hired, Etling wanted to take the time to speak with Hazell before making a final decision on Purdue. Upon the completion of the first semester of his senior year of high school, Etling fulfilled his graduation requirements and decided to enroll at Purdue for the spring semester.

College recruiting
Name	Hometown	School	Height	Weight	40^{‡}	Commit date
Danny Etling; QB	Terre Haute, Indiana	Terre Haute South Vigo High School	6 ft 3 in (1.91 m)	200 lb (91 kg)	4.6	Apr 17, 2012
Danny Etling; QB	Recruit ratings: Scout: Rivals: 247Sports: ESPN: (83)					
Overall recruit ranking: Scout: 40 (QB) Rivals: 9 (QB), 4 (IN), 167 (National) ESPN: 12 (QB), 3 (IN), 20 (Midwest)
Note: In many cases, Scout, Rivals, 247Sports, On3, and ESPN may conflict in their listings of height and weight.; In these cases, the average was taken. ESPN grades are on a 100-point scale.; Sources: "Purdue Football Commitment List (23)". Rivals.; "Purdue College Football Recruiting Commits". Scout.; "ESPN". ESPN.; "Scout.com Team Recruiting Rankings". Scout.; "2013 Team Ranking". Rivals.com.

== College career ==
=== Purdue ===
In the preseason of 2013, Etling was in a three-way quarterback battle with Rob Henry and Austin Appleby. When Henry was named the starter for the season, Purdue released its depth chart with Appleby listed as the number two quarterback. This led many to believe that Etling would utilize a redshirt.

After the Boilermakers started their 2013 season with an 0–3 record, and with Henry continuing to struggle in the team's fourth game, Etling was thrust into a game with Purdue trailing 27–10 to Northern Illinois. Etling finished the game with 241 yards passing while throwing two touchdowns and two interceptions. During the ensuing week, Etling was named the starter for the Boilermakers against Nebraska. Purdue struggled in Etling's first start, losing 44–7. Overall, Etling appeared in eight games, passing for 1690 yards, ten touchdowns, and seven interceptions, with a 116.1 quarterback rating. The team finished with a 1–11 record.

Going into the 2014 season, Etling was named the starter. However, during the season Etling was moved second on the depth chart, behind Appleby. Etling appeared in five games, passing for 800 yards, six touchdowns, five interceptions, and a 102.5 quarterback rating. Purdue's record for the season was 3–9.

On June 11, 2015, Etling asked for and was granted a release on his scholarship from Purdue.

=== LSU ===
On June 22, 2015, it was announced that Etling would transfer to Louisiana State University (LSU). Due to NCAA transfer rules, Etling sat out the 2015 season. He served as the starting quarterback for the LSU Tigers during their 2016 and 2017 seasons, playing a total of 24 games. In 2016, the Tigers were 7–4 during the regular season and defeated the Louisville Cardinals in the 2016 Citrus Bowl played on December 31. In 2017, the Tigers had a 9–3 regular season record, and lost to Notre Dame in the 2018 Citrus Bowl played on January 1. Etling passed for a total of 4,586 yards, 27 touchdowns, seven interceptions, and had a quarterback rating of 144.4 in his two seasons with LSU.

== Professional career ==
Pre-draft measurables
Height	Weight	Arm length	Hand span	Wingspan	40-yard dash	10-yard split	20-yard split	20-yard shuttle	Three-cone drill	Vertical jump	Broad jump
6 ft 2 1/2 in (1.89 m)	222 lb (101 kg)	31 in (0.79 m)	9 3/8 in (0.24 m)	6 ft 3 1/4 in (1.91 m)	4.76 s	1.60 s	2.75 s	4.37 s	7.09 s	30.5 in (0.77 m)	9 ft 6 in (2.90 m)
All values from NFL Combine

=== New England Patriots ===
Etling was drafted by the New England Patriots in the seventh round (219th overall) of the 2018 NFL draft.

In the Patriots' first preseason game of the 2018 season, Etling completed two of five passes for 21 yards and no touchdowns. In the final preseason game, Etling went 18-32 for 157 yards with one touchdown pass and two interceptions. He also ran for 113 yards on seven carries, including an 86-yard touchdown run. Etling holds the record for longest quarterback run in Patriots preseason history.

On September 1, 2018, Etling was waived by the Patriots and was signed to the practice squad the next day. Etling won Super Bowl LIII with the Patriots when they defeated the Los Angeles Rams 13–3. He signed a reserve/future contract with the Patriots on February 5, 2019.

At the start of the 2019 season's training camp, Etling transitioned to the wide receiver position. He was waived on August 13, 2019.

=== Atlanta Falcons ===
On August 14, 2019, Etling was claimed off waivers by the Atlanta Falcons. He no longer was making the transition to wide receiver and switched back to full time quarterback. He was waived on August 31, and was signed to the practice squad the next day. On October 26, after an injury to starter Matt Ryan, Etling was promoted to the active roster as the team's backup quarterback ahead of their Week 8 matchup. He was waived on October 28, and re-signed to the practice squad. On December 30, the team signed Etling to a reserve/future contract.

Etling was placed on the reserve/COVID-19 list by the Falcons on July 31, 2020, and was activated five days later. On August 17, the Falcons waived Etling.

=== Seattle Seahawks ===
On August 18, 2020, Etling was claimed off waivers by the Seattle Seahawks. On September 5, Etling was waived from the Seahawks, and signed to the team's practice squad the next day. On January 11, 2021, Etling signed a reserve/futures contract with the Seahawks. He was waived on August 1.

=== Minnesota Vikings ===
On August 2, 2021, Etling was claimed off waivers by the Minnesota Vikings. He was waived on August 23.

=== BC Lions ===
On September 10, 2021, Etling signed with the practice roster of the BC Lions of the Canadian Football League. He was released by the Lions on October 12.

=== Seattle Seahawks (second stint) ===
On October 13, 2021, Etling was signed by the Seahawks to their practice squad. He was released on October 27.

=== Denver Broncos ===
On November 13, 2021, Etling was signed to the Denver Broncos practice squad due to backup Drew Lock testing positive for COVID-19. He was released three days later after Lock returned.

=== Green Bay Packers (first stint) ===
On December 7, 2021, Etling was signed to the Green Bay Packers' practice squad in the wake of Packers backup quarterback Jordan Love being placed on the COVID-19 reserve list. He was released six days later.

=== Jacksonville Jaguars ===
On December 20, 2021, Etling was signed to the Jacksonville Jaguars' practice squad.

=== Green Bay Packers (second stint) ===
On January 25, 2022, Etling signed a reserve/future contract with the Packers. He was waived on August 30, and re-signed to the practice squad the next day. Etling signed a reserve/future contract with Green Bay on January 10, 2023. He was waived by the Packers on August 6.

=== Michigan Panthers ===
On December 24, 2023, Etling signed with the Michigan Panthers of the United States Football League (USFL). He re-signed with the team on August 26, 2024.

== Career statistics ==
=== UFL ===
==== Regular season ====
Year	Team	Games			Passing								Rushing			
Year	Team	GP	GS	Record	Cmp	Att	Pct	Yds	Y/A	TD	Int	Rtg	Att	Yds	Avg	TD
2024	MICH	7	4	3–1	69	114	60.5	787	6.9	3	2	82.7	24	143	6.0	2
2025	MICH	8	3	2–1	55	96	57.3	591	6.2	5	2	84.2	17	77	4.6	0
Career		15	7	5–2	124	210	59.0	1,378	6.6	8	4	83.4	41	220	5.4	2

==== Postseason ====
Year	Team	League	Games			Passing								Rushing			
Year	Team	League	GP	GS	Record	Cmp	Att	Pct	Yds	Y/A	TD	Int	Rtg	Att	Yds	Avg	TD
2024	MICH	UFL	1	1	0–1	18	29	62.1	182	6.3	1	3	51.9	2	3	1.5	0
Career			1	1	0–1	18	29	62.1	182	6.3	1	3	51.9	2	3	1.5	0

=== College ===
Season	Team	Games			Passing							Rushing			
Season	Team	GP	GS	Record	Cmp	Att	Pct	Yds	TD	Int	Rtg	Att	Yds	Avg	TD
2013	Purdue	8	7	0–7	149	267	55.8	1,690	10	7	116.1	55	-99	-1.8	1
2014	Purdue	5	5	2–3	89	162	54.9	800	6	5	102.5	33	-5	-0.2	3
2015	LSU	0	0	—	Did not play due to NCAA transfer rules										
2016	LSU	11	10	7–3	160	269	59.5	2,123	11	5	135.6	41	46	1.1	1
2017	LSU	13	13	9–4	165	275	60.0	2,463	16	2	153.0	72	128	1.8	2
Career		37	35	18–17	563	973	57.9	7,076	43	19	129.6	201	70	0.3	7

== Coaching career ==
On January 16, 2026, the Washington Commanders hired Etling as their assistant quarterbacks coach on head coach Dan Quinn's staff.

== Personal life ==
Etling's cousin, Joe Holland, also played football.
