= Kurt Hinish =

American football player (born 1999)

Profile
- Position: Defensive tackle

Personal information
- Born: April 27, 1999 (age 27); Pittsburgh, Pennsylvania, U.S.
- Listed height: 6 ft 1 in (1.85 m)
- Listed weight: 296 lb (134 kg)

Career information
- High school: Central Catholic (Pittsburgh)
- College: Notre Dame (2017–2021)
- NFL draft: 2022: undrafted

Career history
- Houston Texans (2022–2025)

Career NFL statistics as of 2024
- Total tackles: 57
- Sacks: 1.5
- Pass deflections: 1
- Stats at Pro Football Reference

Kurt Braeden Hinish (born April 27, 1999) is an American professional football defensive tackle. He played college football for the Notre Dame Fighting Irish and was signed by the Houston Texans as an undrafted free agent in 2022.

== Early life ==
Hinish was born on April 27, 1999, and grew up in Pittsburgh, Pennsylvania. He attended Central Catholic High School. As a junior in football, he recorded 32 tackles and helped the team compile a 15–1 record. As a senior in 2016, he made 27 tackles and three sacks, earning first-team all-state honors. He also was named to the Pittsburgh Post-Gazette Fabulous 22 and the Pittsburgh Tribune-Review Terrific 25. He was ranked the eighth-best player in Pennsylvania and the number 26 overall defensive tackle by ESPN.

== College career ==
Hinish committed to the University of Notre Dame in March 2016. He played his first season on their Fighting Irish football team in 2017 and appeared in 13 games, recording eight tackles. In 2018, as a sophomore, Hinish played in all 13 games and made 13 tackles along with 1.5 sacks. The following year, he started every game and registered 15 tackles, two sacks and a forced fumble.

As a senior in 2020, Hinish recorded 19 tackles, 7.5 tackles-for-loss and two sacks in 11 starts. In 2021, he was named team captain and broke the all-time record for most games played by a Notre Dame player. He graduated following the 2021 season and finished his college career with All-Conference honors, 61 games played with 35 starts, 81 tackles, 7.5 sacks, 20 tackles-for-loss and one forced fumble.

== Professional career ==
Pre-draft measurables
Height	Weight	Arm length	Hand span	40-yard dash	10-yard split	20-yard split	20-yard shuttle	Three-cone drill	Vertical jump	Broad jump	Bench press
6 ft 2 1/4 in (1.89 m)	302 lb (137 kg)	32 1/8 in (0.82 m)	10 in (0.25 m)	5.07 s	1.72 s	2.84 s	4.48 s	7.39 s	28.0 in (0.71 m)	9 ft 0 in (2.74 m)	31 reps
All values from Pro Day

After going unselected in the 2022 NFL draft, Hinish was signed by the Houston Texans as an undrafted free agent. He started the preseason near the bottom of the depth chart, but was receiving first-team reps by the end of the preseason. He became one of three undrafted rookies to make the final roster. As a rookie, he appeared in 15 games and started three. He finished with one sack and 23 total tackles (11 solo).

On August 27, 2024, Hinish was placed on injured reserve, and activated on October 15. In 10 games for Houston, he logged 12 combined tackles.

On March 6, 2025, Hinish re-signed with the Texans on a one-year, $1.8 million contract.

On March 13, 2026, Hinish was released by the Texans following a failed physical.

== Career statistics ==
=== NFL ===
Year	Team	Games		Tackles					Interceptions						Fumbles		
Year	Team	GP	GS	Total	Solo	Ast	Sck	Sfty	PD	Int	Yds	Avg	Lng	TD	FF	FR	TD
2022	HOU	15	3	23	11	12	1.0	0	0	0	0	0.0	0	0	0	0	0
2023	HOU	17	1	22	11	11	0.5	0	1	0	0	0.0	0	0	0	0	0
2024	HOU	10	0	12	5	7	0.0	0	0	0	0	0.0	0	0	0	0	0
Career		42	4	57	27	30	1.5	0	1	0	0	0.0	0	0	0	0	0

=== College ===
Year	Team	Games		Tackles				Interceptions				Fumbles		
Year	Team	GP	GS	Total	Solo	Ast	Sack	PD	Int	Yds	TD	FF	FR	TD
2017	Notre Dame	12	0	8	1	7	0.0	0	0	0	0	0	0	0
2018	Notre Dame	13	0	13	6	7	1.5	0	0	0	0	0	0	0
2019	Notre Dame	13	13	15	7	8	2.0	0	0	0	0	1	0	0
2020	Notre Dame	12	11	19	13	6	2.0	0	0	0	0	0	0	0
2021	Notre Dame	11	11	28	15	13	2.0	0	0	0	0	0	0	0
Career		61	35	83	42	41	7.5	0	0	0	0	1	0	0
