= Miles Boykin =

American football player (born 1996)

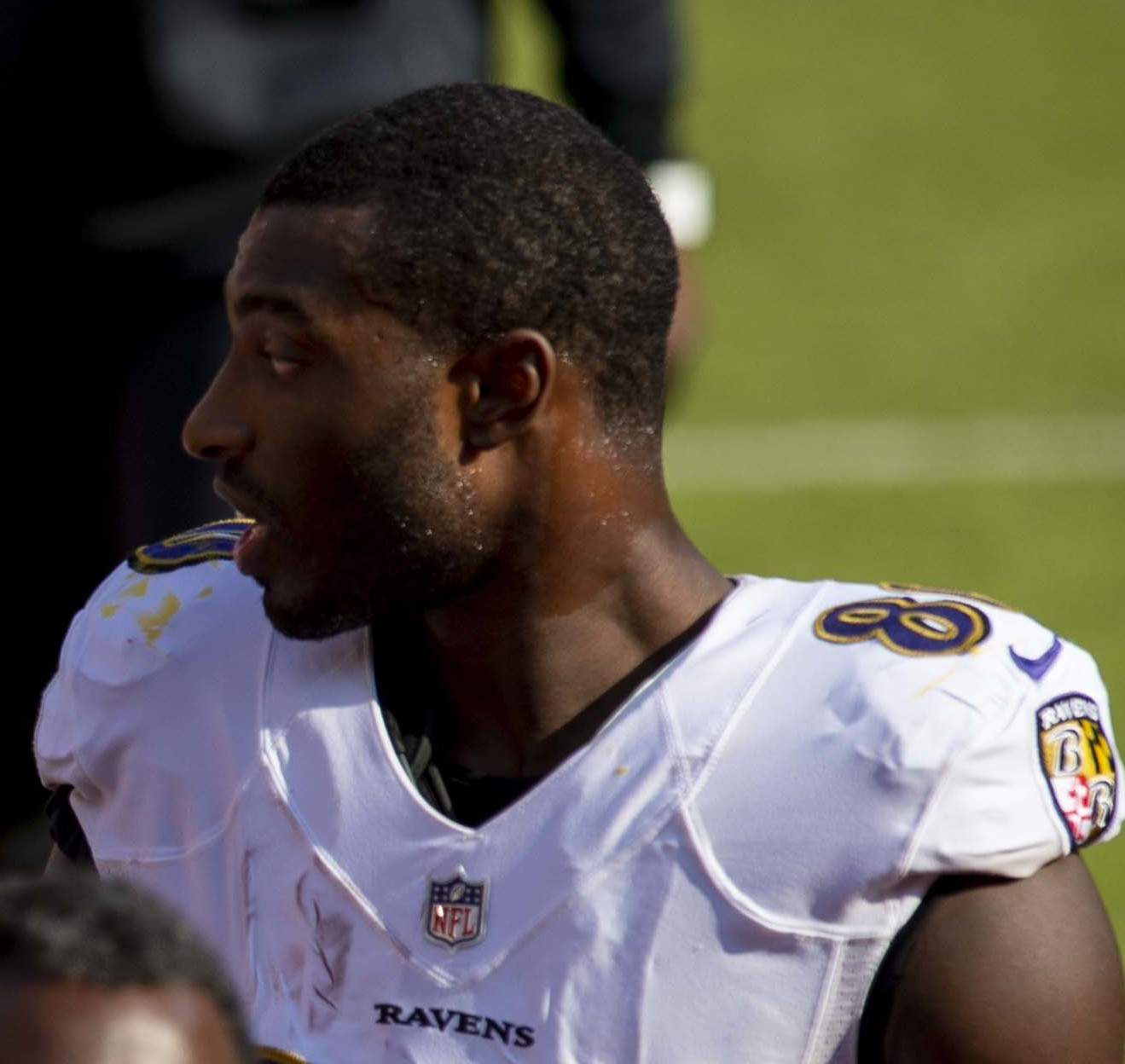
- Boykin with the Baltimore Ravens in 2020

No. 80, 13
- Position: Wide receiver

Personal information
- Born: October 12, 1996 (age 30); Tinley Park, Illinois, U.S.
- Listed height: 6 ft 4 in (1.93 m)
- Listed weight: 231 lb (105 kg)

Career information
- High school: Providence Catholic (New Lenox, Illinois)
- College: Notre Dame (2015–2018)
- NFL draft: 2019: 3rd round, 93rd overall pick

Career history
- Baltimore Ravens (2019–2021); Pittsburgh Steelers (2022–2023); New York Giants (2024)*; Seattle Seahawks (2024)*; Chicago Bears (2025)*
- * Offseason or practice squad member only

Career NFL statistics
- Receptions: 38
- Receiving yards: 498
- Receiving touchdowns: 7
- Stats at Pro Football Reference

Miles Boykin (born October 12, 1996) is an American former professional football player who was a wide receiver in the National Football League (NFL). He played college football for the Notre Dame Fighting Irish, and was selected in the third round of the 2019 NFL draft by the Baltimore Ravens. Boykin also played for the Pittsburgh Steelers.

== Early life ==
Boykin grew up in Tinley Park, Illinois where he played little league football for the Tinley Park Bulldogs organization. Boykin attended Providence Catholic High School in New Lenox, Illinois. He committed to the University of Notre Dame to play college football.

== College career ==
After redshirting his first year at Notre Dame in 2015, Boykin played in 12 games in 2016 and had six receptions for 81 yards and a touchdown. As a sophomore in 2017, he had 12 receptions for 253 yards and two touchdowns. He was named the MVP of the 2018 Citrus Bowl after recording three receptions for 102 yards and the game-winning touchdown. As a junior in 2018, Boykin had 59 receptions for 872 yards and eight touchdowns. After the season, he entered the 2019 NFL draft.

== Professional career ==
Pre-draft measurables
Height	Weight	Arm length	Hand span	40-yard dash	10-yard split	20-yard split	20-yard shuttle	Three-cone drill	Vertical jump	Broad jump	Bench press
6 ft 3 3/4 in (1.92 m)	220 lb (100 kg)	33 1/2 in (0.85 m)	9 7/8 in (0.25 m)	4.42 s	1.50 s	2.57 s	4.07 s	6.77 s	43.5 in (1.10 m)	11 ft 8 in (3.56 m)	12 reps
All values from NFL Combine

=== Baltimore Ravens ===
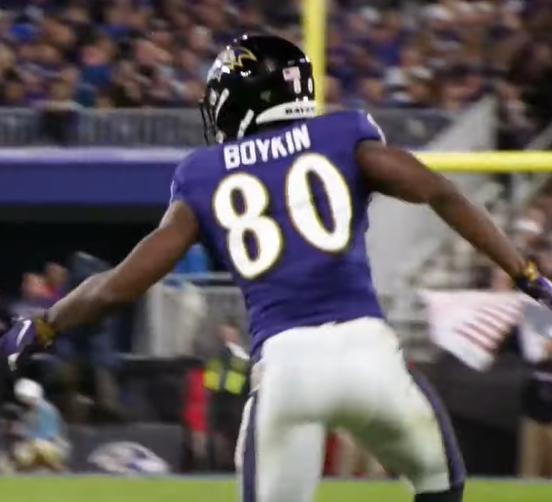
Boykin with the Ravens in 2020

Boykin was selected by the Baltimore Ravens in the third round (93rd overall) of the 2019 NFL draft. He caught a touchdown pass in his NFL debut in the Ravens' 2019 season opener against the Miami Dolphins. Boykin recorded a career-high three receptions and his second career touchdown in Week 4 against the Cleveland Browns. He recorded a career-high 55 yards, including a 50-yard catch, in Week 7 against the Seattle Seahawks. Boykin recorded his third touchdown against the New York Jets in Week 15.

Boykin was placed on the reserve/COVID-19 list by the team on December 16, 2020, and activated three days later.

On September 1, 2021, Boykin was placed on injured reserve to start the season with a hamstring injury. On September 29, Boykin was activated to the active roster.

On April 18, 2022, the Ravens released Boykin to save salary cap space.

=== Pittsburgh Steelers ===
On April 19, 2022, the Pittsburgh Steelers claimed Boykin off of waivers.

He was re-signed to a one-year contract on April 24, 2023.

=== New York Giants ===
On April 9, 2024, Boykin signed with the New York Giants. On August 28, Boykin was released by the Giants and re-signed to the practice squad the same day, but was released a few days later.

=== Seattle Seahawks ===
On September 18, 2024, Boykin was signed to the Seattle Seahawks' practice squad.

=== Chicago Bears ===
On April 3, 2025, Boykin was signed by the Chicago Bears to a one-year deal. On August 26, he was released by the Bears as part of final roster cuts and signed to the practice squad the following day. On November 8, Boykin was released.

=== Dallas Renegades ===
On January 13, 2026, Boykin was selected by the Dallas Renegades in the 2026 UFL Draft. However, on February 11, Boykin announced his retirement from professional football.

== Career statistics ==
=== NFL ===
Year	Team	Games		Receiving				
Year	Team	GP	GS	Rec	Yds	Avg	Lng	TD
2019	BAL	16	11	13	198	15.2	50	3
2020	BAL	16	13	19	266	14.0	43	4
2021	BAL	8	0	1	6	6.0	6	0
2022	PIT	16	1	2	11	5.5	11	0
2023	PIT	17	0	3	17	5.7	6	0
Career		73	25	38	498	13.1	50	7

=== College ===
Year	Team	Games		Receiving				
Year	Team	GP	GS	Rec	Yds	Avg	Lng	TD
2015	Notre Dame	0	0	DNP				
2016	Notre Dame	12	0	6	81	13.5	25	1
2017	Notre Dame	12	1	12	253	21.1	55	2
2018	Notre Dame	13	12	59	872	14.8	40	8
Career		37	13	77	1,206	15.7	55	11
