= Te'von Coney =

American football player (born 1997)

No. 4, 56
- Position: Linebacker

Personal information
- Born: June 10, 1997 (age 29); Palm Beach Gardens, Florida, U.S.
- Listed height: 6 ft 1 in (1.85 m)
- Listed weight: 230 lb (104 kg)

Career information
- High school: Palm Beach Gardens
- College: Notre Dame (2015–2018)
- NFL draft: 2019: undrafted

Career history
- Oakland / Las Vegas Raiders (2019–2021)*; Philadelphia Stars (2022–2023)
- * Offseason or practice squad member only
- Stats at Pro Football Reference

Te'von Coney (born June 10, 1997) is an American former football linebacker. He played college football for the Notre Dame Fighting Irish, and signed with the Oakland Raiders as an undrafted free agent in 2019.

== Early life ==
Coney attended Palm Beach Gardens Community High School in Palm Beach Gardens, Florida. He had 136 tackles and two interceptions as a senior and 172 tackles and two interceptions as a junior. He committed to the University of Notre Dame to play college football.

== College career ==
As a true freshman at Notre Dame in 2015, Coney played in 12 games and recorded 13 tackles as a backup and on special teams. As a sophomore in 2016, he started nine of 12 games, recording 61 tackles. As a junior in 2017, Coney started seven of 13 games, recording 116 tackles and three sacks. Coney returned to Notre Dame for his senior year in 2018.

== Professional career ==
=== Oakland / Las Vegas Raiders ===
Coney signed with the Oakland Raiders as an undrafted free agent on May 3, 2019. He was waived on August 31, 2019. He was re-signed to the practice squad on December 11, 2019. His practice squad contract with the team expired on January 6, 2020. He signed a reserve/future contract with the Raiders on January 24, 2020. He was waived on May 5, 2020.

On August 17, 2021, Coney re-signed with the Raiders. He was waived on August 26.

=== Philadelphia Stars ===
Coney was selected in the 30th round of the 2022 USFL draft by the Philadelphia Stars. He was placed on the team's injured reserve list on April 25, 2023. The Stars folded when the XFL and USFL merged to create the United Football League (UFL).
