= 2017 NCAA Division I FBS football rankings =

- Season: 2017
- Bowl season: 2017–18 bowl games
- Preseason No. 1: Alabama
- End of season champions: Alabama
- Conference with most teams in final AP poll: SEC, Big Ten (5)

Two human polls and a committee's selections comprised the 2017 National Collegiate Athletic Association (NCAA) Division I Football Bowl Subdivision (FBS) football rankings, in addition to various publications' preseason polls. Unlike most sports, college football's governing body, the NCAA, does not bestow a national championship, instead that title is bestowed by one or more different polling agencies. There are two main weekly polls that begin in the preseason—the AP Poll and the Coaches Poll. One additional poll, the College Football Playoff (CFP) ranking, is released midway through the season after the ninth week.

== Legend ==
| | Increase in ranking |
| | Decrease in ranking |
| | Not ranked previous week |
| | Selected for College Football Playoff |
| (#–#) | Win–loss record |
| (Italics) | Number of first place votes |
| т | Tied with team above or below also with this symbol |

== AP Poll ==
| | Preseason Aug 21 | Week 1 Sep 5 | Week 2 Sep 10 | Week 3 Sep 17 | Week 4 Sep 24 | Week 5 Oct 1 | Week 6 Oct 8 | Week 7 Oct 15 | Week 8 Oct 22 | Week 9 Oct 29 | Week 10 Nov 5 | Week 11 Nov 12 | Week 12 Nov 19 | Week 13 Nov 26 | Week 14 Dec 3 | Week 15 (Final) Jan 9 | |
|---|---|---|---|---|---|---|---|---|---|---|---|---|---|---|---|---|---|
| 1. | Alabama (52) | Alabama (1–0) (60) | Alabama (2–0) (58) | Alabama (3–0) (45) | Alabama (4–0) (52) | Alabama (5–0) (44) | Alabama (6–0) (43) | Alabama (7–0) (61) | Alabama (8–0) (61) | Alabama (8–0) (59) | Alabama (9–0) (56) | Alabama (10–0) (57) | Alabama (11–0) (58) | Clemson (11–1) (27) | Clemson (12–1) (43) | Alabama (13–1) (57) | 1. |
| 2. | Ohio State (3) | Ohio State (1–0) (1) | Oklahoma (2–0) (2) | Clemson (3–0) (15) | Clemson (4–0) (8) | Clemson (5–0) (17) | Clemson (6–0) (18) | Penn State (6–0) | Penn State (7–0) | Georgia (8–0) (2) | Georgia (9–0) (5) | Miami (FL) (9–0) (4) | Miami (FL) (10–0) (3) | Oklahoma (11–1) (24) | Oklahoma (12–1) (18) | Georgia (13–2) | 2. |
| 3. | Florida State (4) | Clemson (1–0) | Clemson (2–0) (1) | Oklahoma (3–0) (1) | Oklahoma (4–0) (1) | Oklahoma (4–0) | Penn State (6–0) | Georgia (7–0) | Georgia (7–0) | Ohio State (7–1) | Notre Dame (8–1) | Oklahoma (9–1) | Oklahoma (10–1) | Wisconsin (12–0) (10) | Georgia (12–1) | Oklahoma (12–2) | 3. |
| 4. | USC (2) | Penn State (1–0) | USC (2–0) | Penn State (3–0) | Penn State (4–0) | Penn State (5–0) | Georgia (6–0) | TCU (6–0) | TCU (7–0) | Wisconsin (8–0) | Clemson (8–1) | Clemson (9–1) | Clemson (10–1) | Auburn (10–2) | Alabama (11–1) | Clemson (12–2) | 4. |
| 5. | Clemson | Oklahoma (1–0) | Penn State (2–0) | USC (3–0) | USC (4–0) | Georgia (5–0) | Washington (6–0) | Wisconsin (6–0) | Wisconsin (7–0) | Notre Dame (7–1) | Oklahoma (8–1) | Wisconsin (10–0) | Wisconsin (11–0) | Alabama (11–1) | Ohio State (11–2) | Ohio State (12–2) | 5. |
| 6. | Penn State | USC (1–0) | Washington (2–0) | Oklahoma State (3–0) | Washington (4–0) | Washington (5–0) | TCU (5–0) | Ohio State (6–1) | Ohio State (6–1) | Clemson (7–1) | Wisconsin (9–0) | Auburn (8–2) | Auburn (9–2) | Georgia (11–1) | Wisconsin (12–1) | UCF (13–0) (4) | 6. |
| 7. | Oklahoma | Washington (1–0) | Michigan (2–0) | Washington (3–0) | Georgia (4–0) | Michigan (4–0) | Wisconsin (5–0) | Clemson (6–1) | Clemson (6–1) | Penn State (7–1) | Miami (FL) (8–0) | Georgia (9–1) | Georgia (10–1) | Miami (FL) (10–1) | Auburn (10–3) | Wisconsin (13–1) | 7. |
| 8. | Washington | Michigan (1–0) | Ohio State (1–1) | Michigan (3–0) | Michigan (4–0) | TCU (4–0) | Washington State (6–0) | Miami (FL) (5–0) | Miami (FL) (6–0) | Oklahoma (7–1) | TCU (8–1) | Ohio State (8–2) | Ohio State (9–2) | Ohio State (10–2) | USC (11–2) | Penn State (11–2) | 8. |
| 9. | Wisconsin | Wisconsin (1–0) | Oklahoma State (2–0) | Wisconsin (3–0) | TCU (4–0) | Wisconsin (4–0) | Ohio State (5–1) | Oklahoma (5–1) | Notre Dame (6–1) | Miami (FL) (7–0) | Washington (8–1) | Notre Dame (8–2) | Notre Dame (9–2) | Penn State (10–2) | Penn State (10–2) | TCU (11–3) | 9. |
| 10. | Oklahoma State | Florida State (0–1) | Wisconsin (2–0) | Ohio State (2–1) | Wisconsin (3–0) | Ohio State (4–1) | Auburn (5–1) | Oklahoma State (5–1) | Oklahoma (6–1) | TCU (7–1) | Auburn (7–2) | Oklahoma State (8–2) | TCU (9–2) | TCU (10–2) | UCF (12–0) | Auburn (10–4) | 10. |
| 11. | Michigan | Oklahoma State (1–0) | Florida State (0–1) | Georgia (3–0) | Ohio State (3–1) | Washington State (5–0) | Miami (FL) (4–0) | USC (6–1) | Oklahoma State (6–1) | Oklahoma State (7–1) | Ohio State (7–2) | TCU (8–2) | USC (10–2) | USC (10–2) | Miami (FL) (10–2) | Notre Dame (10–3) | 11. |
| 12. | Auburn | LSU (1–0) | LSU (2–0) | Florida State (0–1) | Virginia Tech (4–0) | Auburn (4–1) | Oklahoma (4–1) | Washington (6–1) | Washington (6–1) | Washington (7–1) | Oklahoma State (7–2) | USC (9–2) | Penn State (9–2) | UCF (11–0) | Washington (10–2) | USC (11–3) | 12. |
| 13. | LSU | Auburn (1–0) | Georgia (2–0) | Virginia Tech (3–0) | Auburn (3–1) | Miami (FL) (3–0) | USC (5–1) | Notre Dame (5–1) | Virginia Tech (6–1) | Virginia Tech (7–1) | Michigan State (7–2) | Penn State (8–2) | UCF (10–0) | Washington (10–2) | TCU (10–3) | Miami (FL) (10–3) | 13. |
| 14. | Stanford | Stanford (1–0) | Louisville (2–0) | Miami (FL) (1–0) | Miami (FL) (2–0) | USC (4–1) | Oklahoma State (4–1) | Virginia Tech (5–1) | NC State (6–1) | Iowa State (6–2) | UCF (8–0) | UCF (9–0) | Washington State (9–2) | Stanford (9–3) | Notre Dame (9–3) | Oklahoma State (10–3) | 14. |
| 15. | Georgia | Georgia (1–0) | Auburn (1–1) | Auburn (2–1) | Oklahoma State (3–1) | Oklahoma State (4–1) | Virginia Tech (5–1) | Washington State (6–1) | Washington State (7–1) | UCF (7–0) | USC (8–2) | Washington State (9–2) | Washington (9–2) | Notre Dame (9–3) | Stanford (9–4) | Michigan State (10–3) | 15. |
| 16. | Louisville | Miami (FL) (1–0) | Virginia Tech (2–0) | TCU (3–0) | Washington State (4–0) | Virginia Tech (4–1) | Notre Dame (5–1) | South Florida (6–0) | Michigan State (6–1) | Auburn (6–2) | Penn State (7–2) | Washington (8–2) | Mississippi State (8–3) | Memphis (10–1) | LSU (9–3) | Washington (10–3) | 16. |
| 17. | Florida | Louisville (1–0) | Miami (FL) (1–0) | Mississippi State (3–0) | Louisville (3–1) | Louisville (4–1) | Michigan (4–1) | NC State (6–1) | South Florida (7–0) | USC (7–2) | Virginia Tech (7–2) | Mississippi State (7–3) | Memphis (9–1) | LSU (9–3) | Oklahoma State (9–3) | Northwestern (10–3) | 17. |
| 18. | Miami (FL) | Virginia Tech (1–0) | Kansas State (2–0) | Washington State (3–0) | South Florida (4–0) | South Florida (5–0) | South Florida (5–0) | Michigan State (5–1) | UCF (6–0) | Stanford (6–2) | Mississippi State (7–2) | Memphis (8–1) | Oklahoma State (8–3) | Oklahoma State (9–3) | Michigan State (9–3) | LSU (9–4) | 18. |
| 19. | South Florida | Kansas State (1–0) | Stanford (1–1) | Louisville (2–1) | San Diego State (4–0) | San Diego State (5–0) | San Diego State (6–0) | Michigan (5–1) | Auburn (6–2) | LSU (6–2) | Washington State (8–2) | Michigan (8–2) | LSU (8–3) | Michigan State (9–3) | Memphis (10–2) | Mississippi State (9–4) | 19. |
| 20. | Kansas State | Washington State (1–0) | TCU (2–0) | Florida (1–1) | Utah (4–0) | Utah (4–0) | NC State (5–1) | UCF (5–0) | Stanford (5–2) | NC State (6–2) | Memphis (8–1) | Stanford (7–3) | Stanford (8–3) | Northwestern (9–3) | Northwestern (9–3) | Stanford (9–5) | 20. |
| 21. | Virginia Tech | South Florida (1–0) | Washington State (2–0) | South Florida (3–0) | Florida (2–1) | Notre Dame (4–1) т | Michigan State (4–1) | Auburn (5–2) | USC (6–2) | Mississippi State (6–2) | Michigan (7–2) | LSU (7–3) | Michigan State (8–3) | Washington State (9–3) | Washington State (9–3) | South Florida (10–2) | 21. |
| 22. | West Virginia | Florida (0–1) | South Florida (2–0) | San Diego State (3–0) | Notre Dame (3–1) | Florida (3–1) т | UCF (4–0) | Stanford (5–2) | West Virginia (5–2) | Memphis (7–1) | South Florida (8–1) | Michigan State (7–3) | South Florida (9–1) | Virginia Tech (9–3) | Virginia Tech (9–3) | Boise State (11–3) | 22. |
| 23. | Texas | TCU (1–0) | Tennessee (2–0) | Utah (3–0) | West Virginia (3–1) | West Virginia (3–1) | Stanford (4–2) | West Virginia (4–2) | LSU (6–2) | Arizona (6–2) | West Virginia (6–3) | South Florida (8–1) | Northwestern (8–3) | South Florida (9–2) | South Florida (9–2) | NC State (9–4) | 23. |
| 24. | Washington State | Notre Dame (1–0) | Florida (0–1) | Oregon (3–0) | Mississippi State (3–1) | NC State (4–1) | Texas Tech (4–1) | LSU (5–2) | Memphis (6–1) | Michigan State (6–2) | Iowa State (6–3) | West Virginia (7–3) | Virginia Tech (8–3) | Mississippi State (8–4) | Mississippi State (8–4) | Virginia Tech (9–4) | 24. |
| 25. | Tennessee | Tennessee (1–0) | UCLA (2–0) | LSU (2–1) | LSU (3–1) | UCF (3–0) | Navy (5–0) | Memphis (5–1) | Iowa State (5–2) | Washington State (7–2) | Iowa (6–3) | NC State (7–3) | Boise State (9–2) | Fresno State (9–3) | Boise State (10–3) | Memphis (10–3) | 25. |
| | Preseason Aug 21 | Week 1 Sep 5 | Week 2 Sep 10 | Week 3 Sep 17 | Week 4 Sep 24 | Week 5 Oct 1 | Week 6 Oct 8 | Week 7 Oct 15 | Week 8 Oct 22 | Week 9 Oct 29 | Week 10 Nov 5 | Week 11 Nov 12 | Week 12 Nov 19 | Week 13 Nov 26 | Week 14 Dec 3 | Week 15 (Final) Jan 9 | |
| | | Dropped: West Virginia; Texas | Dropped: Notre Dame | Dropped: Kansas State; Stanford; Tennessee; UCLA | Dropped: Florida State; Oregon | Dropped: Mississippi State; LSU | Dropped: West Virginia; Louisville; Utah; Florida | Dropped: San Diego State; Texas Tech; Navy | Dropped: Michigan | Dropped: South Florida; West Virginia | Dropped: Stanford; LSU; NC State; Arizona | Dropped: Virginia Tech; Iowa State; Iowa | Dropped: Michigan; West Virginia; NC State | Dropped: Boise State | Dropped: Fresno State | Dropped: Washington State | |

== Coaches Poll ==
| | Preseason Aug 3 | Week 1 Sep 5 | Week 2 Sep 10 | Week 3 Sep 17 | Week 4 Sep 24 | Week 5 Oct 1 | Week 6 Oct 8 | Week 7 Oct 15 | Week 8 Oct 22 | Week 9 Oct 29 | Week 10 Nov 5 | Week 11 Nov 12 | Week 12 Nov 19 | Week 13 Nov 26 | Week 14 Dec 3 | Week 15 (Final) Jan 9 | |
|---|---|---|---|---|---|---|---|---|---|---|---|---|---|---|---|---|---|
| 1. | Alabama (49) | Alabama (1–0) (60) | Alabama (2–0) (58) | Alabama (3–0) (59) | Alabama (4–0) (59) | Alabama (5–0) (59) | Alabama (6–0) (57) | Alabama (7–0) (63) | Alabama (8–0) (64) | Alabama (8–0) (65) | Alabama (9–0) (64) | Alabama (10–0) (63) | Alabama (11–0) (63) | Clemson (11–1) (25) | Clemson (12–1) (49) | Alabama (13–1) (62) | 1. |
| 2. | Ohio State (5) | Ohio State (1–0) (2) | Clemson (2–0) (2) | Clemson (3–0) (6) | Clemson (4–0) (4) | Clemson (5–0) (6) | Clemson (6–0) (8) | Penn State (6–0) | Penn State (7–0) | Georgia (8–0) | Georgia (9–0) (1) | Miami (FL) (9–0) | Miami (FL) (10–0) | Oklahoma (11–1) (12) | Oklahoma (12–1) (10) | Georgia (13–2) | 2. |
| 3. | Florida State (4) | Clemson (1–0) (3) | Oklahoma (2–0) | Oklahoma (3–0) | Oklahoma (4–0) | Oklahoma (4–0) | Penn State (6–0) | Georgia (7–0) | Georgia (7–0) | Ohio State (7–1) | Wisconsin (9–0) | Clemson (9–1) | Clemson (10–1) | Wisconsin (12–0) (21) | Georgia (12–1) (2) | Oklahoma (12–2) | 3. |
| 4. | USC | Penn State (1–0) | USC (2–0) | Penn State (3–0) | Penn State (4–0) | Penn State (5–0) | Washington (6–0) | TCU (6–0) | TCU (7–0) | Wisconsin (8–0) | Clemson (8–1) | Wisconsin (10–0) | Wisconsin (11–0) | Auburn (10–2) (4) | Alabama (11–1) | Clemson (12–2) | 4. |
| 5. | Clemson (7) | USC (1–0) | Penn State (2–0) | USC (3–0) | USC (4–0) | Washington (5–0) | Georgia (6–0) | Wisconsin (6–0) | Wisconsin (7–0) | Clemson (7–1) | Notre Dame (8–1) | Oklahoma (9–1) | Oklahoma (10–1) | Alabama (11–1) | Ohio State (11–2) | Ohio State (12–2) | 5. |
| 6. | Penn State | Oklahoma (1–0) | Washington (2–0) | Washington (3–0) | Washington (4–0) | Georgia (5–0) | Wisconsin (5–0) | Ohio State (6–1) | Ohio State (6–1) | Miami (FL) (7–0) | Miami (FL) (8–0) | Auburn (8–2) | Auburn (9–2) | Georgia (11–1) | Wisconsin (12–1) | Wisconsin (13–1) | 6. |
| 7. | Washington | Washington (1–0) | Michigan (2–0) | Oklahoma State (3–0) | Michigan (4–0) | Michigan (4–0) | TCU (5–0) | Miami (FL) (5–0) | Clemson (6–1) | Penn State (7–1) | Oklahoma (8–1) | Georgia (9–1) | Georgia (10–1) | Ohio State (10–2) т | USC (11–2) | UCF (13–0) | 7. |
| 8. | Oklahoma | Michigan (1–0) | Oklahoma State (2–0) | Michigan (3–0) | Georgia (4–0) | Wisconsin (4–0) | Ohio State (5–1) | Clemson (6–1) | Miami (FL) (6–0) | Notre Dame (7–1) | Washington (8–1) | Ohio State (8–2) | Ohio State (9–2) | Miami (FL) (10–1) т | Auburn (10–3) | Penn State (11–2) | 8. |
| 9. | Michigan | Florida State (0–1) | Ohio State (1–1) | Ohio State (2–1) | Ohio State (3–1) | Ohio State (4–1) | Washington State (6–0) | Oklahoma (5–1) | Oklahoma (6–1) | Oklahoma (7–1) | TCU (8–1) | Notre Dame (8–2) | Notre Dame (9–2) | USC (10–2) | Penn State (10–2) | TCU (11–3) | 9. |
| 10. | Wisconsin | Oklahoma State (1–0) | Florida State (0–1) | Wisconsin (3–0) | Wisconsin (3–0) | TCU (4–0) | Miami (FL) (4–0) | USC (6–1) | Notre Dame (6–1) | Oklahoma State (7–1) | Auburn (7–2) | USC (9–2) | USC (10–2) | Penn State (10–2) | UCF (12–0) | USC (11–3) | 10. |
| 11. | Oklahoma State | Wisconsin (1–0) | LSU (2–0) | Florida State (0–1) | TCU (4–0) | Washington State (5–0) | Auburn (5–1) | Oklahoma State (5–1) | Washington (6–1) | Washington (7–1) | Ohio State (7–2) | Penn State (8–2) | Penn State (9–2) | UCF (11–0) | Miami (FL) (10–2) | Notre Dame (10–3) | 11. |
| 12. | LSU | LSU (1–0) | Wisconsin (2–0) | Georgia (3–0) | Virginia Tech (4–0) | Miami (FL) (3–0) | Oklahoma (4–1) | Washington (6–1) | Oklahoma State (6–1) | TCU (7–1) | UCF (8–0) | UCF (9–0) | UCF (10–0) | TCU (10–2) | Washington (10–2) | Auburn (10–4) | 12. |
| 13. | Auburn | Auburn (1–0) | Georgia (2–0) | Virginia Tech (3–0) | Miami (FL) (2–0) | Auburn (4–1) | USC (5–1) | South Florida (6–0) | Virginia Tech (6–1) | Virginia Tech (7–1) | Penn State (7–2) | Oklahoma State (8–2) | TCU (9–2) | Washington (10–2) | TCU (10–3) | Miami (FL) (10–3) | 13. |
| 14. | Stanford | Stanford (1–0) | Louisville (2–0) | Miami (FL) (1–0) | Oklahoma State (3–1) | Oklahoma State (4–1) | Oklahoma State (4–1) | Virginia Tech (5–1) | South Florida (7–0) | UCF (7–0) | USC (8–2) | TCU (8–2) | Washington (9–2) | Memphis (10–1) | LSU (9–3) | Oklahoma State (10–3) | 14. |
| 15. | Georgia | Georgia (1–0) | Miami (FL) (1–0) | TCU (3–0) | Auburn (3–1) | USC (4–1) | South Florida (5–0) | Michigan (5–1) | NC State (6–1) | Auburn (6–2) | Oklahoma State (7–2) | Washington (8–2) | Washington State (9–2) | Stanford (9–3) | Notre Dame (9–3) | Washington (10–3) | 15. |
| 16. | Florida | Louisville (1–0) | Virginia Tech (2–0) | Auburn (2–1) | Washington State (4–0) | South Florida (5–0) | Michigan (4–1) | Notre Dame (5–1) | Washington State (7–1) | Iowa State (6–2) | Michigan State (7–2) | Washington State (9–2) | Memphis (9–1) | LSU (9–3) | Stanford (9–4) | Michigan State (10–3) | 16. |
| 17. | Louisville | Miami (FL) (1–0) | Auburn (1–1) | South Florida (3–0) | South Florida (4–0) | Louisville (4–1) | Virginia Tech (5–1) | NC State (6–1) | UCF (6–0) | USC (7–2) | Virginia Tech (7–2) | Memphis (8–1) | Mississippi State (8–3) | Notre Dame (9–3) | Oklahoma State (9–3) | Northwestern (10–3) | 17. |
| 18. | Miami (FL) | Virginia Tech (1–0) | Kansas State (2–0) | Washington State (3–0) | Louisville (3–1) | Utah (4–0) | San Diego State (6–0) | Washington State (6–1) | Michigan State (6–1) | Stanford (6–2) | Mississippi State (7–2) | Michigan (8–2) | LSU (8–3) | Oklahoma State (9–3) | Memphis (10–2) | LSU (9–4) | 18. |
| 19. | Kansas State | Kansas State (1–0) | Stanford (1–1) | Mississippi State (3–0) | Utah (4–0) | Virginia Tech (4–1) | Notre Dame (5–1) | Michigan State (5–1) | Auburn (6–2) | NC State (6–2) | Memphis (8–1) | Mississippi State (7–3) | South Florida (9–1) | Michigan State (9–3) | Michigan State (9–3) | Stanford (9–5) | 19. |
| 20. | West Virginia | South Florida (1–0) | TCU (2–0) | Louisville (2–1) | Florida (2–1) | Florida (3–1) | NC State (5–1) | UCF (5–0) | Stanford (5–2) | LSU (6–2) | Washington State (8–2) | South Florida (8–1) | Stanford (8–3) | Northwestern (9–3) | Northwestern (9–3) | Mississippi State (9–4) | 20. |
| 21. | South Florida | Tennessee (1–0) | South Florida (2–0) | Utah (3–0) | San Diego State (4–0) | San Diego State (5–0) | UCF (4–0) | Auburn (5–2) | USC (6–2) | Memphis (7–1) | South Florida (8–1) | LSU (7–3) | Oklahoma State (8–3) | Virginia Tech (9–3) | Washington State (9–3) | South Florida (10–2) | 21. |
| 22. | Virginia Tech | Washington State (1–0) | Washington State (2–0) | Florida (1–1) | LSU (3–1) | Notre Dame (4–1) | Michigan State (4–1) | Stanford (5–2) | West Virginia (5–2) | Mississippi State (6–2) | Michigan (7–2) | NC State (7–3) | Michigan State (8–3) | Washington State (9–3) | Virginia Tech (9–3) | Boise State (11–3) | 22. |
| 23. | Texas | Utah (1–0) | Tennessee (2–0) | LSU (2–1) | West Virginia (3–1) | West Virginia (3–1) | Utah (4–1) | West Virginia (4–2) | LSU (6–2) | South Florida (7–1) | Iowa State (6–3) | Stanford (7–3) | Northwestern (8–3) | South Florida (9–2) | Mississippi State (8–4) | NC State (9–4) | 23. |
| 24. | Tennessee | Florida (0–1) | Utah (2–0) | Oregon (3–0) | Mississippi State (3–1) | NC State (4–1) | Navy (5–0) | Texas A&M (5–2) | Texas A&M (5–2) | Michigan (6–2) | NC State (6–3) | Michigan State (7–3) | Boise State (9–2) | Mississippi State (8–4) | South Florida (9–2) | Memphis (10–3) | 24. |
| 25. | Utah | Notre Dame (1–0) | Florida (0–1) | San Diego State (3–0) | Florida State (0–2) | UCF (3–0) | Stanford (4–2) | LSU (5–2) | Michigan (5–2) | Arizona (6–2) | LSU (6–3) | West Virginia (7–3) | Virginia Tech (8–3) | San Diego State (10–2) | Boise State (10–3) | Virginia Tech (9–4) | 25. |
| | Preseason Aug 3 | Week 1 Sep 5 | Week 2 Sep 10 | Week 3 Sep 17 | Week 4 Sep 24 | Week 5 Oct 1 | Week 6 Oct 8 | Week 7 Oct 15 | Week 8 Oct 22 | Week 9 Oct 29 | Week 10 Nov 5 | Week 11 Nov 12 | Week 12 Nov 19 | Week 13 Nov 26 | Week 14 Dec 3 | Week 15 (Final) Jan 9 | |
| | | Dropped: West Virginia; Texas | Dropped: Notre Dame | Dropped: Kansas State; Stanford; Tennessee | Dropped: Oregon | Dropped: LSU; Mississippi State; Florida State | Dropped: Louisville; Florida; West Virginia | Dropped: San Diego State; Utah; Navy | None | Dropped: Washington State; Michigan State; West Virginia; Texas A&M | Dropped: Stanford; Arizona | Dropped: Virginia Tech; Iowa State | Dropped: Michigan; NC State; West Virginia | Dropped: Boise State | Dropped: San Diego State | Dropped: Washington State | |

== CFP rankings ==
| | Week 9 Oct 31 | Week 10 Nov 7 | Week 11 Nov 14 | Week 12 Nov 21 | Week 13 Nov 28 | Week 14 (Final) Dec 3 | |
|---|---|---|---|---|---|---|---|
| 1. | Georgia (8–0) | Georgia (9–0) | Alabama (10–0) | Alabama (11–0) | Clemson (11–1) | Clemson (12–1) | 1. |
| 2. | Alabama (8–0) | Alabama (9–0) | Clemson (9–1) | Miami (FL) (10–0) | Auburn (10–2) | Oklahoma (12–1) | 2. |
| 3. | Notre Dame (7–1) | Notre Dame (8–1) | Miami (FL) (9–0) | Clemson (10–1) | Oklahoma (11–1) | Georgia (12–1) | 3. |
| 4. | Clemson (7–1) | Clemson (8–1) | Oklahoma (9–1) | Oklahoma (10–1) | Wisconsin (12–0) | Alabama (11–1) | 4. |
| 5. | Oklahoma (7–1) | Oklahoma (8–1) | Wisconsin (10–0) | Wisconsin (11–0) | Alabama (11–1) | Ohio State (11–2) | 5. |
| 6. | Ohio State (7–1) | TCU (8–1) | Auburn (8–2) | Auburn (9–2) | Georgia (11–1) | Wisconsin (12–1) | 6. |
| 7. | Penn State (7–1) | Miami (FL) (8–0) | Georgia (9–1) | Georgia (10–1) | Miami (FL) (10–1) | Auburn (10–3) | 7. |
| 8. | TCU (7–1) | Wisconsin (9–0) | Notre Dame (8–2) | Notre Dame (9–2) | Ohio State (10–2) | USC (11–2) | 8. |
| 9. | Wisconsin (8–0) | Washington (8–1) | Ohio State (8–2) | Ohio State (9–2) | Penn State (10–2) | Penn State (10–2) | 9. |
| 10. | Miami (FL) (7–0) | Auburn (7–2) | Penn State (8–2) | Penn State (9–2) | USC (10–2) | Miami (FL) (10–2) | 10. |
| 11. | Oklahoma State (7–1) | USC (8–2) | USC (9–2) | USC (10–2) | TCU (10–2) | Washington (10–2) | 11. |
| 12. | Washington (7–1) | Michigan State (7–2) | TCU (8–2) | TCU (9–2) | Stanford (9–3) | UCF (12–0) | 12. |
| 13. | Virginia Tech (7–1) | Ohio State (7–2) | Oklahoma State (8–2) | Washington State (9–2) | Washington (10–2) | Stanford (9–4) | 13. |
| 14. | Auburn (6–2) | Penn State (7–2) | Washington State (9–2) | Mississippi State (8–3) | UCF (11–0) | Notre Dame (9–3) | 14. |
| 15. | Iowa State (6–2) | Oklahoma State (7–2) | UCF (9–0) | UCF (10–0) | Notre Dame (9–3) | TCU (10–3) | 15. |
| 16. | Mississippi State (6–2) | Mississippi State (7–2) | Mississippi State (7–3) | Michigan State (8–3) | Michigan State (9–3) | Michigan State (9–3) | 16. |
| 17. | USC (7–2) | Virginia Tech (7–2) | Michigan State (7–3) | Washington (9–2) | LSU (9–3) | LSU (9–3) | 17. |
| 18. | UCF (7–0) | UCF (8–0) | Washington (8–2) | LSU (8–3) | Washington State (9–3) | Washington State (9–3) | 18. |
| 19. | LSU (6–2) | Washington State (8–2) | NC State (7–3) | Oklahoma State (8–3) | Oklahoma State (9–3) | Oklahoma State (9–3) | 19. |
| 20. | NC State (6–2) | Iowa (6–3) | LSU (7–3) | Memphis (9–1) | Memphis (10–1) | Memphis (10–2) | 20. |
| 21. | Stanford (6–2) | Iowa State (6–3) | Memphis (8–1) | Stanford (8–3) | Northwestern (9–3) | Northwestern (9–3) | 21. |
| 22. | Arizona (6–2) | Memphis (8–1) | Stanford (7–3) | Northwestern (8–3) | Virginia Tech (9–3) | Virginia Tech (9–3) | 22. |
| 23. | Memphis (7–1) | NC State (6–3) | Northwestern (7–3) | Boise State (9–2) | Mississippi State (8–4) | Mississippi State (8–4) | 23. |
| 24. | Michigan State (6–2) | LSU (6–3) | Michigan (8–2) | South Carolina (8–3) | NC State (8–4) | NC State (8–4) | 24. |
| 25. | Washington State (7–2) | Northwestern (6–3) | Boise State (8–2) | Virginia Tech (8–3) | Fresno State (9–3) | Boise State (10–3) | 25. |
| | Week 9 Oct 31 | Week 10 Nov 7 | Week 11 Nov 14 | Week 12 Nov 21 | Week 13 Nov 28 | Week 14 (Final) Dec 3 | |
| | | Dropped: Stanford; Arizona | Dropped: Virginia Tech; Iowa; Iowa State | Dropped: NC State; Michigan | Dropped: Boise State; South Carolina | Dropped: Fresno State | |
