= 2018 Citrus Bowl =

American college football game

2018 Citrus Bowl presented by Overton's
- 72nd Citrus Bowl
Notre Dame Fighting Irish	LSU Tigers
(9–3)	(9–3)
Independent	SEC
21	17
Head coach: Brian Kelly	Head coach: Ed Orgeron
AP / Coaches / CFP; 14 / 15 / 14	AP / Coaches / CFP; 16 / 14 / 17
	1	2	3	4	Total
Notre Dame	0	3	3	15	21
LSU	0	0	7	10	17
- Date: January 1, 2018
- Season: 2017
- Stadium: Camping World Stadium
- Location: Orlando, Florida
- MVP: Miles Boykin (Notre Dame)
- Favorite: LSU by 3
- Referee: Cooper Castleberry (Big 12)
- Attendance: 57,726

United States TV coverage
- Network: ABC
- Announcers: TV: Mark Jones, Rod Gilmore, Quint Kessenich; Radio: Dave LaMont, Anthony Becht, Rocky Boiman

The 2018 Citrus Bowl was an American college football bowl game played on January 1, 2018, at Camping World Stadium in Orlando, Florida. This was the 72nd edition of a game that has been played annually since 1946, under several different names. It was one of the 2017–18 NCAA football bowl games concluding the 2017 NCAA Division I FBS football season. The game was nationally televised on ABC. Sponsored by Overton's, a boating and marine supply retailer, the game was officially known as the Citrus Bowl presented by Overton's.

== Teams ==
The game featured the independent Notre Dame Fighting Irish and the LSU Tigers of the Southeastern Conference; both teams finished the 2017 season with 9–3 records, and both teams finished in the top-20 of all major polls. Notre Dame, making their first appearance in the Citrus Bowl, was the designated visiting team. LSU, the designated home team, appeared in the game for the second season in a row, and fifth time overall. For the second year in a row, no Big Ten team appeared in the Citrus Bowl; since Wisconsin committed to the Orange Bowl, the Citrus Bowl was allowed to pick Notre Dame or an Atlantic Coast Conference team.

This was the fourth bowl meeting between the Fighting Irish and Tigers, with LSU winning twice previously, and Notre Dame once. LSU prevailed 27–9 in the 1997 Independence Bowl, and 41–14 in the 2007 Sugar Bowl, and Notre Dame won 31–28 in the 2014 Music City Bowl. Notre Dame and LSU met eight times in the regular season between 1970 and 1998, with the Irish holding a 5–3 edge.

=== Notre Dame ===
Notre Dame came into the game with a 9–3 record, having lost to Georgia, Miami (Florida), and Stanford. Each team they lost to was ranked in the top 20 of the AP Poll at the time they played.

=== LSU ===
LSU came into the game with a 9–3 record overall, 6–2 in the SEC. Their two SEC losses were to Mississippi State and Alabama (who was ranked number one in the AP Poll at the time). Their one non-conference loss was to Troy of the Sun Belt Conference.

== Game summary ==
=== Scoring summary ===
Scoring summary

Quarter	Time	Drive			Team	Scoring information	Score	
Quarter	Time	Plays	Yards	TOP	Team	Scoring information	ND	LSU
2	0:04	11	51	2:00	ND	46-yard field goal by Justin Yoon	3	0
3	11:37	5	43	2:16	LSU	Derrius Guice 20-yard touchdown reception from Danny Etling, Jack Gonsoulin kick good	3	7
3	2:47	5	18	2:20	ND	49-yard field goal by Justin Yoon	6	7
4	11:13	12	75	6:34	LSU	Derrius Guice 2-yard touchdown reception from Danny Etling, Jack Gonsoulin kick good	6	14
4	7:45	10	75	3:24	ND	Michael Young 6-yard touchdown reception from Ian Book, 2-point pass from Ian Book to Josh Adams good	14	14
4	2:03	12	76	5:46	LSU	17-yard field goal by Jack Gonsoulin	14	17
4	1:28	3	73	0:35	ND	Miles Boykin 55-yard touchdown reception from Ian Book, Justin Yoon kick good	21	17
"TOP" = time of possession. For other American football terms, see Glossary of American football.							21	17

=== Statistics ===
	1	2	3	4	Total
No. 14 Fighting Irish	0	3	3	15	21
No. 17 Tigers	0	0	7	10	17

Statistics	ND	LSU
First downs	18	22
Plays–yards	61–370	75–399
Rushes–yards	33–154	42–170
Passing yards	216	229
Passing: Comp–Att–Int	17–28–1	19–33–0
Time of possession	22:28	37:32

Team	Category	Player	Statistics
ND	Passing	Ian Book	14/19, 164 yds, 2 TD, 1 INT
ND	Rushing	Josh Adams	15 car, 44 yds
ND	Receiving	Miles Boykin	3 rec, 102 yds, 1 TD
LSU	Passing	Danny Etling	19/33, 229 yds, 2 TD
LSU	Rushing	Derrius Guice	21 car, 98 yds
LSU	Receiving	D. J. Chark	5 rec, 63 yds

== Aftermath ==
As of 2023, Notre Dame has yet to return to the Citrus Bowl. However, the 2019 Fighting Irish played in the Camping World Bowl in the same stadium, defeating Iowa State 33–9.

LSU returned to the Citrus Bowl following its 2022 season, its first under coach Brian Kelly, who left Notre Dame after 12 seasons to succeed Ed Orgeron. The Tigers crushed Purdue 63-7 to finish a 10–4 season.
