= 2017 LSU Tigers football team =

American college football season

2017 LSU Tigers football

Citrus Bowl, L 17–21 vs. Notre Dame
- Conference: Southeastern Conference
- Western Division

Ranking
- Coaches: No. 18
- AP: No. 18
- Record: 9–4 (6–2 SEC)
- Head coach: Ed Orgeron (1st season)
- Offensive coordinator: Matt Canada (1st season)
- Offensive scheme: Multiple
- Defensive coordinator: Dave Aranda (2nd season)
- Base defense: 3–4
- Home stadium: Tiger Stadium

Uniform
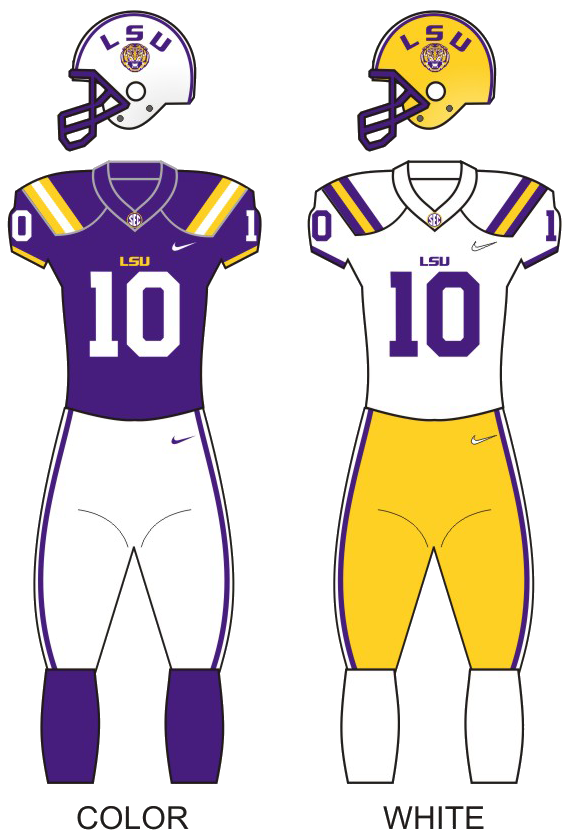

2017 Southeastern Conference football standings
	Conf.			Overall
Team	W		L	W		L
Eastern Division
No. 2 Georgia x$^	7	–	1	13	–	2
South Carolina	5	–	3	9	–	4
Kentucky	4	–	4	7	–	6
Missouri	4	–	4	7	–	6
Florida	3	–	5	4	–	7
Vanderbilt	1	–	7	5	–	7
Tennessee	0	–	8	4	–	8
Western Division
No. 10 Auburn xy	7	–	1	10	–	4
No. 1 Alabama x#^	7	–	1	13	–	1
No. 18 LSU	6	–	2	9	–	4
No. 19 Mississippi State	4	–	4	9	–	4
Texas A&M	4	–	4	7	–	6
Ole Miss*	3	–	5	6	–	6
Arkansas	1	–	7	4	–	8
Championship: Georgia 28, Auburn 7
# – College Football Playoff champion; ^ – College Football Playoff participant; $ – Conference champion; x – Division champion/co-champions; y – Championship game participant; * Ole Miss ineligible for postseason due to NCAA sanctions; Rankings from AP Poll

The 2017 LSU Tigers football team represented Louisiana State University in the 2017 NCAA Division I FBS football season. The Tigers played their home games at Tiger Stadium in Baton Rouge, Louisiana and competed in the Western Division of the Southeastern Conference (SEC). They were led by first-year head coach Ed Orgeron after he led the Tigers as interim head coach for the final eight games of 2016. They finished the season 9–4, 6–2 in SEC play to finish in third place in the Western Division. They were invited to the Citrus Bowl where they lost to Notre Dame.

The Tigers equaled an FBS record by committing only eight turnovers during the season, becoming the sixth FBS team to do so. The record would fall the next season to Georgia Southern, which had only five turnovers.

== Recruiting ==
=== Recruits ===
The Tigers signed a total of 23 recruits.

College recruiting information (2017)
Name	Hometown	School	Height	Weight	Commit date
Tyler Shelvin; DT	Crowley, Louisiana	Notre Dame HS	6 ft 3 in (1.91 m)	360 lb (160 kg)	Mar 11, 2015
Tyler Shelvin; DT	Recruit ratings: Scout: Rivals: 247Sports: ESPN:				
Clyde Edwards-Helaire; RB	Baton Rouge, Louisiana	Catholic HS	5 ft 7 in (1.70 m)	191 lb (87 kg)	Feb 13, 2016
Clyde Edwards-Helaire; RB	Recruit ratings: Scout: Rivals: 247Sports: ESPN:				
Jontre Kirklin; CB	Lutcher, Louisiana	Lutcher HS	6 ft 0 in (1.83 m)	170 lb (77 kg)	Feb 13, 2016
Jontre Kirklin; CB	Recruit ratings: Scout: Rivals: 247Sports: ESPN:				
Patrick Queen; RB	Livonia, Louisiana	Livonia HS	6 ft 1 in (1.85 m)	218 lb (99 kg)	Feb 27, 2016
Patrick Queen; RB	Recruit ratings: Scout: Rivals: 247Sports: ESPN:				
Ed Ingram; OG	DeSoto, Texas	DeSoto HS	6 ft 4 in (1.93 m)	325 lb (147 kg)	Apr 15, 2016
Ed Ingram; OG	Recruit ratings: Scout: Rivals: 247Sports: ESPN:				
Austin Deculus; OT	Cypress, Texas	Cy-Fair HS	6 ft 6 in (1.98 m)	331 lb (150 kg)	May 20, 2016
Austin Deculus; OT	Recruit ratings: Scout: Rivals: 247Sports: ESPN:				
Tory Carter; FB	Leesburg, Georgia	Lee County HS	6 ft 2 in (1.88 m)	255 lb (116 kg)	May 21, 2016
Tory Carter; FB	Recruit ratings: Scout: Rivals: 247Sports: ESPN:				
Aaron Moffitt; DE	Baton Rouge, Louisiana	Catholic HS	6 ft 4 in (1.93 m)	255 lb (116 kg)	May 23, 2016
Aaron Moffitt; DE	Recruit ratings: Scout: Rivals: 247Sports: ESPN:				
Saahdiq Charles; OG	Madison, Mississippi	Madison-Ridgeland Academy	6 ft 5 in (1.96 m)	314 lb (142 kg)	May 24, 2016
Saahdiq Charles; OG	Recruit ratings: Scout: Rivals: 247Sports: ESPN:				
Mannie Netherly; WR	Crosby, Texas	Crosby HS	6 ft 2 in (1.88 m)	185 lb (84 kg)	Jun 24, 2016
Mannie Netherly; WR	Recruit ratings: Scout: Rivals: 247Sports: ESPN:				
Grant Delpit; S	Houston, Texas	IMG Academy	6 ft 2 in (1.88 m)	175 lb (79 kg)	Jul 9, 2016
Grant Delpit; S	Recruit ratings: Scout: Rivals: 247Sports: ESPN:				
Seth Stewart; OT	Point Pleasant, West Virginia	Point Pleasant HS	6 ft 8 in (2.03 m)	320 lb (150 kg)	Jul 23, 2016
Seth Stewart; OT	Recruit ratings: Scout: Rivals: 247Sports: ESPN:				
Kary Vincent Jr. CB	Port Arthur, Texas	Memorial HS	5 ft 11 in (1.80 m)	170 lb (77 kg)	Jul 24, 2016
Kary Vincent Jr. CB	Recruit ratings: Scout: Rivals: 247Sports: ESPN:				
Neil Farrell Jr. DT	Mobile, Alabama	Murphy HS	6 ft 4 in (1.93 m)	295 lb (134 kg)	Jul 26, 2016
Neil Farrell Jr. DT	Recruit ratings: Scout: Rivals: 247Sports: ESPN:				
JaCoby Stevens; S	Murfreesboro, Tennessee	Oakland HS	6 ft 1 in (1.85 m)	200 lb (91 kg)	Aug 8, 2016
JaCoby Stevens; S	Recruit ratings: Scout: Rivals: 247Sports: ESPN:				
Justin Thomas; DE	Spanish Fort, Alabama	Spanish Fort HS	6 ft 5 in (1.96 m)	255 lb (116 kg)	Aug 13, 2016
Justin Thomas; DE	Recruit ratings: Scout: Rivals: 247Sports: ESPN:				
Myles Brennan; QB	Bay St. Louis, Mississippi	Saint Stanislaus College	6 ft 3 in (1.91 m)	180 lb (82 kg)	Dec 15, 2016
Myles Brennan; QB	Recruit ratings: Scout: Rivals: 247Sports: ESPN:				
Lowell Narcisse; QB	St. James Parish, Louisiana	St. James HS	6 ft 2 in (1.88 m)	224 lb (102 kg)	Dec 19, 2016
Lowell Narcisse; QB	Recruit ratings: Scout: Rivals: 247Sports: ESPN:				
Racey McMath; WR	New Orleans, Louisiana	Edna Karr HS	6 ft 3 in (1.91 m)	215 lb (98 kg)	Jan 20, 2017
Racey McMath; WR	Recruit ratings: Scout: Rivals: 247Sports: ESPN:				
Jacob Phillips; LB	Nashville, Tennessee	East Nashville Magnet School	6 ft 3 in (1.91 m)	223 lb (101 kg)	Jan 26, 2017
Jacob Phillips; LB	Recruit ratings: Scout: Rivals: 247Sports: ESPN:				
Tyler Taylor; LB	Buford, Georgia	Lanier HS	6 ft 2 in (1.88 m)	230 lb (100 kg)	Feb 1, 2017
Tyler Taylor; LB	Recruit ratings: Scout: Rivals: 247Sports: ESPN:				
Todd Harris; S	Plaquemine, Louisiana	Plaquemine HS	6 ft 0 in (1.83 m)	180 lb (82 kg)	Feb 1, 2017
Todd Harris; S	Recruit ratings: Scout: Rivals: 247Sports: ESPN:				
K'Lavon Chaisson; DE	Houston, Texas	North Shore HS	6 ft 4 in (1.93 m)	220 lb (100 kg)	Feb 1, 2017
K'Lavon Chaisson; DE	Recruit ratings: Scout: Rivals: 247Sports: ESPN:				
Overall recruit ranking:
Note: In many cases, Scout, Rivals, 247Sports, On3, and ESPN may conflict in their listings of height and weight.; In these cases, the average was taken. ESPN grades are on a 100-point scale.; Sources: "LSU Football Commitments". Rivals.; "2017 LSU Football Commits". Scout.; "ESPN". ESPN.; "Scout.com Team Recruiting Rankings". Scout.; "2017 Team Ranking". Rivals.com.

== Roster ==
2017 LSU Tigers football team roster
Players
Coaches
Offense

Pos.	#	Name	Class
QB	2	Lowell Narcisse	Fr
WR	3	JaCoby Stevens	Fr
RB	4	Nick Brossette	Jr
RB	5	Derrius Guice	Jr
WR	7	D. J. Chark	Sr
QB	8	Caleb Lewis	Jr
WR	10	Stephen Sullivan	So
WR	11	Dee Anderson	So
QB	12	Justin McMillan	So
WR	13	Micah Dickens	Sr
WR	14	Drake Davis	So
QB	15	Myles Brennan	Fr
QB	16	Danny Etling	Sr
WR	17	Tiger Scheyd	Jr
FB	18	John David Moore	Sr
WR	19	Derrick Dillon	So
RB	22	Clyde Edwards-Helaire	Fr
WR	24	Colby Brunet	Fr
WR	26	Adam Lewis	Fr
RB	27	Lanard Fournette	So
RB	28	Darrel Williams	Sr
WR	29	Louis Landrum	Fr
WR	30	Michael Ostrom	Jr
RB	31	Justin Jones	Fr
WR	32	Justin Jefferson	Fr
WR	34	Ryan McGovern	Sr
WR	35	Wesley McKoy	Jr
WR	39	Michael Kershaw	So
FB	40	Mylik McWilliams	Fr
FB	41	David Ducre	Jr
TE	42	Aaron Moffitt	Fr
FB	44	Tory Carter	Fr
FB	45	Matthew Clapp	Fr
FB	47	Bry'Keithon Mouton	Jr
FB	48	Carlton Smith	Fr
OL	54	Rory Luke	So
OL	58	Jibrail Abdul-Aziz	Jr
OL	62	Justin Mikush	Jr
OL	63	K. J. Malone	Sr
OL	64	Will Clapp	Jr
OL	65	Jakori Savage	Fr
OL	66	Toby Weathersby	Jr
OL	67	Michael Smith	Fr
OL	69	Turner Simmers	Jr
OL	70	Ed Ingram	Fr
OL	71	Donovaughn Campbell	So
OL	72	Jacob Azevedo	So
OL	73	Adrian Magee	So
OL	76	Austin Deculus	Fr
OL	77	Saahdiq Charles	Fr
OL	78	Garrett Brumfield	Jr
OL	79	Lloyd Cushenberry	Fr
TE	80	Jamal Pettigrew	Fr
WR	81	Racey McMath	Fr
TE	82	Thaddeus Moss	So
WR	83	Russell Gage	Jr
TE	84	Foster Moreau	Jr
WR	86	Mannie Netherly	Fr
WR	87	Justin Beckwith	Fr
TE	88	Jacory Washington	Jr
WR	89	Jonathan Giles	Jr

Defense

Pos.	#	Name	Class
DB	1	Donte Jackson	Jr
DB	2	Kevin Toliver II	Jr
LB	4	K'Lavon Chaisson	Fr
LB	6	Jacob Phillips	Fr
LB	8	Patrick Queen	Fr
DB	9	Grant Delpit	Fr
DB	13	Jontre Kirklin	Fr
DB	15	Kary Vincent Jr.	Fr
DB	17	Xavier Lewis	So
DL	18	Christian LaCouture	Sr
DB	21	Ed Paris	Sr
DB	22	Kristian Fulton	So
LB	23	Corey Thompson	Sr
LB	24	Tyler Taylor	Fr
DB	26	John Battle	Jr
DB	27	Treven Kately	Fr
DB	29	Greedy Williams	Fr
DB	30	Eric Monroe	Fr
DB	31	Cameron Lewis	Fr
DB	32	Tony Westly	Sr
DB	33	Todd Harris Jr.	Fr
LB	35	Devin Voorhies	Sr
LB	40	Devin White	So
DB	41	Caleb Brown	Fr
LB	43	Ray Thornton	Fr
LB	45	Michael Divinity	So
LB	46	Andre Anthony	Fr
LB	47	Sean Badeaux	Fr
LB	48	Donnie Alexander	Sr
LB	49	Arden Key	Jr
LB	51	Jonathan Rucker	Sr
LB	53	Layton Garnett	Fr
LB	55	Kody Hall	So
LB	56	M. J. Patterson	Sr
LB	58	Jared Small	Fr
DL	59	Seth Newsome	Fr
DL	72	Tyler Shelvin	Fr
DL	85	Jamil Abdul-Aziz	Fr
LB	87	Sci Martin	So
DL	90	Rashard Lawrence	So
DL	91	Breiden Fehoko	Jr
DL	92	Neil Farrell Jr.	Fr
DL	93	Justin Thomas	Fr
DL	95	Ed Alexander	So
DL	96	Glen Logan	Fr
DL	97	Frank Herron	Sr
DL	98	Deondre Clark	Sr
DL	99	Greg Gilmore	Sr

Special teams

Pos.	#	Name	Class
K	34	Connor Culp	Fr
K	36	Cameron Gamble	Sr
P	38	Josh Growden	So
K	39	Jack Gonsoulin	So
P	46	Zach Von Rosenberg	Fr
LS	50	Blake Ferguson	So
LS	61	David-Michael Carrell	So
LS	89	Trey Gallman	Jr
K	94	Brandon McQuen	Fr

Head coach

- Ed Orgeron

Coordinators/assistant coaches

- Matt Canada – Offensive coordinator
- Dave Aranda – Associate head coach/defensive coordinator
- Tommie Robinson – Assistant head coach/running backs/recruiting coordinator
- Mickey Joseph – Wide receivers
- Steve Ensminger – Tight ends
- Pete Jenkins – Defensive line
- Jeff Grimes – Offensive line/running game coordinator
- Dennis Johnson – Outside linebackers
- Corey Raymond – Defensive backs
- Tommy Moffitt – Assistant athletic director/strength and conditioning
- Dr. Sam Nader – Assistant Athletic Director - Football
- Sharon Lewis – Assistant athletic director/football recruiting and alumni relations
- Austin Thomas – General Manager

Legend

- (C) Team captain
- (S) Suspended
- (I) Ineligible
- Injured
- Redshirt

Roster
Last update: 10/25/18

== Schedule ==
LSU announced its 2017 football schedule on September 13, 2016. The 2017 schedule consisted of 6 home, 5 away and 1 neutral site game in the regular season. The Tigers hosted SEC foes Arkansas, Auburn, and Texas A&M, and traveled to Alabama, Florida, Mississippi State, Ole Miss, and Tennessee.

The Tigers hosted three of the four non-conference opponents, Chattanooga from the FCS Southern Conference, Syracuse from the Atlantic Coast Conference and Troy from the Sun Belt Conference and traveled to New Orleans to for a neutral site matchup against independent BYU.

Date	Time	Opponent	Rank	Site	TV	Result	Attendance
September 2	8:30 p.m.	vs. BYU*	No. 13	Mercedes-Benz Superdome; New Orleans, LA^{[a]} (Texas Kickoff)	ESPN	W 27–0	53,826
September 9	6:30 p.m.	Chattanooga*	No. 12	Tiger Stadium; Baton Rouge, LA	SECN	W 45–10	97,289
September 16	6:00 p.m.	at Mississippi State	No. 12	Davis Wade Stadium; Starkville, MS (rivalry / SEC Nation)	ESPN	L 7–37	60,596
September 23	6:00 p.m.	Syracuse*	No. 25	Tiger Stadium; Baton Rouge, LA	ESPN2	W 35–26	96,044
September 30	6:00 p.m.	Troy*^{†}	No. 25	Tiger Stadium; Baton Rouge, LA	ESPNU	L 21–24	99,879
October 7	2:30 p.m.	at No. 21 Florida		Ben Hill Griffin Stadium; Gainesville, FL (rivalry / SEC Nation)	CBS	W 17–16	88,247
October 14	2:30 p.m.	No. 10 Auburn		Tiger Stadium; Baton Rouge, LA (Tiger Bowl)	CBS	W 27–23	101,601
October 21	6:15 p.m.	at Ole Miss	No. 24	Vaught–Hemingway Stadium; Oxford, MS (Magnolia Bowl)	ESPN	W 40–24	64,067
November 4	7:00 p.m.	at No. 2 Alabama	No. 19	Bryant–Denny Stadium; Tuscaloosa, AL (rivalry / SEC Nation)	CBS	L 10–24	101,821
November 11	11:00 a.m.	Arkansas	No. 24	Tiger Stadium; Baton Rouge, LA (rivalry)	ESPN	W 33–10	98,546
November 18	6:00 p.m.	at Tennessee	No. 20	Neyland Stadium; Knoxville, TN	ESPN	W 30–10	96,888
November 25	6:30 p.m.	Texas A&M	No. 18	Tiger Stadium; Baton Rouge, LA (rivalry)	SECN	W 45–21	97,675
January 1, 2018	12:00 p.m.	vs. No. 14 Notre Dame*	No. 17	Camping World Stadium; Orlando, FL (Citrus Bowl)	ABC	L 17–21	57,726
*Non-conference game; ^{†}Homecoming; Rankings from AP Poll and CFP Rankings after October 31 released prior to game; All times are in Central time

Schedule source:
^{^[a]} The game between LSU and BYU was originally scheduled to take place at NRG Stadium in Houston, Texas. However, due to massive flooding caused by Hurricane Harvey in the Houston area, school and game officials decided to relocate the game to New Orleans.

== Rankings ==
Ranking movements Legend: ██ Increase in ranking ██ Decrease in ranking — = Not ranked RV = Received votes
	Week															
Poll	Pre	1	2	3	4	5	6	7	8	9	10	11	12	13	14	Final
AP	13	12	12	25	25	—	RV	24	23	19	RV	21	19	17	16	18
Coaches	12	12	11	23	22	—	RV	25	23	20	25	21	18	16	14	18
CFP	Not released									19	24	20	18	17	17	Not released
