= 2019 Notre Dame Fighting Irish football team =

America college football season

2019 Notre Dame Fighting Irish football

Camping World Bowl champion

Camping World Bowl, W 33–9 vs. Iowa State
- Conference: Independent

Ranking
- Coaches: No. 11
- AP: No. 12
- Record: 11–2
- Head coach: Brian Kelly (10th season)
- Offensive coordinator: Chip Long (3rd season)
- Offensive scheme: Spread
- Defensive coordinator: Clark Lea (2nd season)
- Base defense: 4–2–5
- MVP: Chase Claypool
- Captains: Ian Book; Jalen Elliott; Chris Finke; Alohi Gilman; Robert Hainsey; Khalid Kareem; Julian Okwara
- Home stadium: Notre Dame Stadium

Uniform
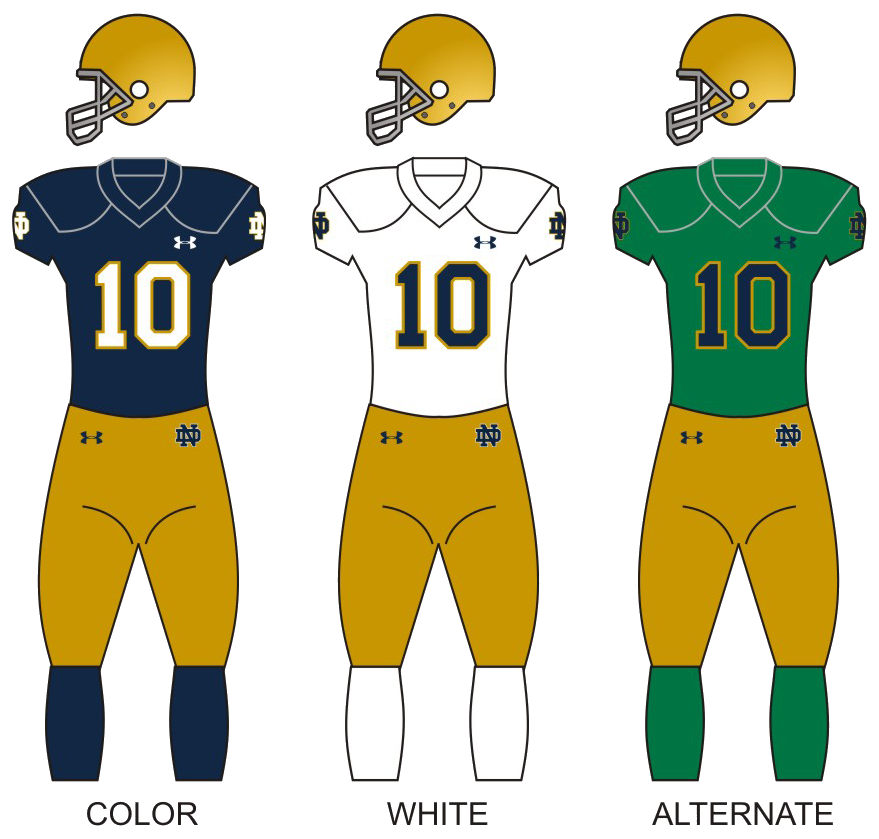

2019 NCAA Division I FBS independents football records
	Conf.			Overall
Team	W		L	W		L
No. 12 Notre Dame		–		11	–	2
Liberty		–		8	–	5
BYU		–		7	–	6
Army		–		5	–	8
New Mexico State		–		2	–	10
UMass		–		1	–	11
Rankings from AP Poll

The 2019 Notre Dame Fighting Irish football team was an American football team that represented the University of Notre Dame as an independent during the 2019 NCAA Division I FBS football season. In their tenth year under head coach Brian Kelly, the team compiled an 11–2 record, outscored opponents by a total of 478 to 233, and were ranked No. 12 in the final AP poll and No. 11 in the final Coaches Poll. In games against ranked opponents, they lost to No. 3 Georgia and No. 19 Michigan and defeated No. 18 Virginia and No. 21 Navy. They concluded the season with a victory over unranked Iowa State in the Camping World Bowl.

The team's statistical leaders included quarterback Ian Book (3,034 passing yards), running back Tony Jones Jr. (857 rushing yards), wide receiver Chase Claypool (66 receptions for 1,037 yards), and kicker Jonathan Doerer (108 points scored).

The team played its home games at Notre Dame Stadium in Notre Dame, Indiana.

== Offseason ==
=== Departures ===
- QB Brandon Wimbush (graduate transferred to UCF)
- RB Dexter Williams (drafted by the Green Bay Packers)
- WR Miles Boykin (drafted by the Baltimore Ravens)
- TE Alizé Mack (drafted by the New Orleans Saints)
- OL Luke Jones (transferred to Arkansas)
- DT Micah Dew-Treadway (graduate transferred to Minnesota)
- LB D.J. Morgan (transferred to UConn)
- CB Julian Love (drafted by New York Giants)
- DB Noah Boykin (transferred to UMass)
- DB Devin Studstill (transferred to USF)
- LB Drue Tranquill (drafted by the Los Angeles Chargers)
- LB Te'von Coney (signed by the Oakland Raiders)
- DT Jerry Tillery (drafted by the Los Angeles Chargers)
- S Derrik Allen (transferred to Georgia Tech)
- P Tyler Newsome (signed by the Los Angeles Chargers)
- K Justin Yoon (graduated)

=== Coaching changes ===
Departures

Autry Denson, the former running backs coach of the Fighting Irish, accepted the head coaching position at Charleston Southern University.

Additions

Lance Taylor was hired to replace Denson as running backs coach. Taylor previously spent time with the Carolina Panthers of the NFL, coaching wide receivers, and at Stanford University, coaching running backs.

=== The Shirt 2019 ===
The 30-year-old tradition of "The Shirt Project" continued with the unveiling of the 2019 edition student t-shirt. For the first time, there is a sweatshirt to go with the traditional tee.

The project has sold more than 2.5 million shirts and raised more than $11 million over its 30 years of existence. Each year, a committee of students designs a shirt to raise money for Notre Dame student clubs and organizations. Actor Patrick Warburton was on hand for the ceremony, as was Coach Kelly.

This year's t-shirt features 'Notre Dame' in 1930's Art Deco lettering to mirror the style that is found all throughout the Stadium. It is set on a faded blue background and includes a very traditional white football and a clover in the middle.

=== Blue–Gold Game ===
The 90th edition of The Blue–Gold Game, an annual spring exhibition game, was played on April 13, 2019, at Notre Dame Stadium and was broadcast on NBCSN. It served as the 15th and final spring practice for the Irish. The Gold Team (defense) beat the Blue Team (offense) by the score of 58–45.

=== Award watch lists ===
Listed in the order that they were released

Award	Player	Position	Year
Lott Trophy	Alohi Gilman	S	SR
Maxwell Award	Ian Book	QB	SR
Bednarik Award	Julian Okwara	DE	SR
Bednarik Award	Khalid Kareem	DE	SR
Jim Thorpe Award	Alohi Gilman	S	SR
Wuerffel Trophy	Jalen Elliott	S	SR
Walter Camp Award	Ian Book	QB	SR

=== Training camp ===
The Irish officially kicked off the 2019 season as they do every season, traveling just under an hour south of campus to Culver Academies in Culver, IN, for an intense five-day training camp. The first practice of the season began in Culver on Sunday, August 4, and the team continued to practice in Culver until Thursday, August 8, at which point the Irish returned to campus to continue its training camp until fall classes begin on Tuesday, August 27.

=== Team captains ===
On Saturday, August 10, the day of Notre Dame's first practice of the season on campus, Brian Kelly publicly announced the captains for the 2019 Irish football team captains. These captains are Ian Book, Chris Finke, Julian Okwara, Khalid Kareem, Jalen Elliott, Alohi Gilman, and Robert Hainsey. Six of these seven captains are seniors or older, with Hainsey being the lone junior captain this season.

== 2019 recruiting class ==
Notre Dame received 22 signed letters of intent, including 21 during the early signing period. The Class of 2019 includes 10 early enrollees, the most ever for the program, who opted to graduate high school early so that they could train and practice with the team during the 2018 spring semester.

College recruiting (2019)
Name	Hometown	School	Height	Weight	Commit date
Kendall Abdur-Rahman; WR	Edwardsville, Illinois	Edwardsville	6 ft 0 in (1.83 m)	185 lb (84 kg)	Sep 9, 2018
Kendall Abdur-Rahman; WR	Recruit ratings: Rivals: 247Sports: ESPN:				
Litchfield Ajavon; DB	Baltimore, Maryland	Episcopal	5 ft 11 in (1.80 m)	185 lb (84 kg)	Apr 21, 2018
Litchfield Ajavon; DB	Recruit ratings: Rivals: 247Sports: ESPN:				
JD Bertrand; LB	Roswell, Georgia	Blessed Trinity Catholic	6 ft 1 in (1.85 m)	200 lb (91 kg)	Nov 19, 2018
JD Bertrand; LB	Recruit ratings: Rivals: 247Sports: ESPN:				
Jay Bramblett; P	Tuscaloosa, Alabama	Hillcrest	6 ft 1 in (1.85 m)	185 lb (84 kg)	May 30, 2018
Jay Bramblett; P	Recruit ratings: Rivals: 247Sports: ESPN:				
Quinn Carroll; OL	Edina, Minnesota	Edina	6 ft 6 in (1.98 m)	285 lb (129 kg)	May 1, 2018
Quinn Carroll; OL	Recruit ratings: Rivals: 247Sports: ESPN:				
Brendon Clark; QB	Midlothian, Virginia	Manchester	6 ft 2 in (1.88 m)	210 lb (95 kg)	Jul 4, 2018
Brendon Clark; QB	Recruit ratings: Rivals: 247Sports: ESPN:				
Zeke Correll; OL	Cincinnati, Ohio	Anderson	6 ft 3 in (1.91 m)	275 lb (125 kg)	Jun 18, 2018
Zeke Correll; OL	Recruit ratings: Rivals: 247Sports: ESPN:				
Howard Cross III; DL	Paramus, New Jersey	Saint Joseph	6 ft 1 in (1.85 m)	265 lb (120 kg)	Apr 22, 2018
Howard Cross III; DL	Recruit ratings: Rivals: 247Sports: ESPN:				
Osita Ekwonu; LB	Charlotte, North Carolina	Providence	6 ft 1 in (1.85 m)	220 lb (100 kg)	Jun 14, 2018
Osita Ekwonu; LB	Recruit ratings: Rivals: 247Sports: ESPN:				
Isaiah Foskey; DL	Antioch, California	De La Salle	6 ft 5 in (1.96 m)	240 lb (110 kg)	Feb 6, 2019
Isaiah Foskey; DL	Recruit ratings: Rivals: 247Sports: ESPN:				
Kyle Hamilton; DB	Atlanta, Georgia	Marist	6 ft 3 in (1.91 m)	190 lb (86 kg)	Apr 24, 2018
Kyle Hamilton; DB	Recruit ratings: Rivals: 247Sports: ESPN:				
Cam Hart; WR	Baltimore, Maryland	Good Counsel	6 ft 3 in (1.91 m)	190 lb (86 kg)	Jul 4, 2018
Cam Hart; WR	Recruit ratings: Rivals: 247Sports: ESPN:				
Jack Kiser; LB	Royal Center, Indiana	Pioneer	6 ft 1 in (1.85 m)	205 lb (93 kg)	Jun 12, 2018
Jack Kiser; LB	Recruit ratings: Rivals: 247Sports: ESPN:				
Andrew Kristofic; OL	Gibsonia, Pennsylvania	Pine-Richland	6 ft 5 in (1.96 m)	275 lb (125 kg)	Apr 23, 2018
Andrew Kristofic; OL	Recruit ratings: Rivals: 247Sports: ESPN:				
Jacob Lacey; DL	Bowling Green, Kentucky	South Warren	6 ft 2 in (1.88 m)	295 lb (134 kg)	Jul 29, 2017
Jacob Lacey; DL	Recruit ratings: Rivals: 247Sports: ESPN:				
Marist Liufau; LB	Kalihi, Hawaii	Punahou	6 ft 2 in (1.88 m)	205 lb (93 kg)	Nov 14, 2018
Marist Liufau; LB	Recruit ratings: Rivals: 247Sports: ESPN:				
John Olmstead; OL	North Brunswick, New Jersey	St. Joseph	6 ft 4 in (1.93 m)	280 lb (130 kg)	Apr 20, 2018
John Olmstead; OL	Recruit ratings: Rivals: 247Sports: ESPN:				
NaNa Osafo-Mensah; DL	Fort Worth, Texas	Nolan Catholic	6 ft 3 in (1.91 m)	235 lb (107 kg)	May 19, 2018
NaNa Osafo-Mensah; DL	Recruit ratings: Rivals: 247Sports: ESPN:				
Isaiah Rutherford; DB	Sacramento, California	Jesuit	6 ft 0 in (1.83 m)	175 lb (79 kg)	Oct 13, 2018
Isaiah Rutherford; DB	Recruit ratings: Rivals: 247Sports: ESPN:				
Hunter Spears; DL	Garland, Texas	Sachse	6 ft 3 in (1.91 m)	295 lb (134 kg)	Feb 20, 2018
Hunter Spears; DL	Recruit ratings: Rivals: 247Sports: ESPN:				
K. J. Wallace; DB	Atlanta, Georgia	The Lovett	5 ft 11 in (1.80 m)	190 lb (86 kg)	Jan 28, 2018
K. J. Wallace; DB	Recruit ratings: Rivals: 247Sports: ESPN:				
Kyren Williams; RB	St. Louis, Missouri	St. John Vianney	5 ft 9 in (1.75 m)	200 lb (91 kg)	Jun 21, 2018
Kyren Williams; RB	Recruit ratings: Rivals: 247Sports: ESPN:				
Overall recruit ranking:
Note: In many cases, Scout, Rivals, 247Sports, On3, and ESPN may conflict in their listings of height and weight.; In these cases, the average was taken. ESPN grades are on a 100-point scale.; Sources:

== Schedule ==
Date	Time	Opponent	Rank	Site	TV	Result	Attendance
September 2	8:00 p.m.	at Louisville	No. 9	Cardinal Stadium; Louisville, KY	ESPN	W 35–17	58,187
September 14	2:30 p.m.	New Mexico	No. 7	Notre Dame Stadium; Notre Dame, IN	NBC	W 66–14	77,622
September 21	8:00 p.m.	at No. 3 Georgia	No. 7	Sanford Stadium; Athens, GA (College GameDay)	CBS	L 17–23	93,246
September 28	3:30 p.m.	No. 18 Virginia	No. 10	Notre Dame Stadium; Notre Dame, IN	NBC	W 35–20	77,622
October 5	3:30 p.m.	Bowling Green	No. 9	Notre Dame Stadium; Notre Dame, IN	NBC	W 52–0	77,622
October 12	7:30 p.m.	USC	No. 9	Notre Dame Stadium; Notre Dame, IN (rivalry)	NBC	W 30–27	77,622
October 26	7:30 p.m.	at No. 19 Michigan	No. 8	Michigan Stadium; Ann Arbor, MI (rivalry)	ABC	L 14–45	111,909
November 2	2:30 p.m.	Virginia Tech	No. 16	Notre Dame Stadium; Notre Dame, IN	NBC	W 21–20	77,622
November 9	7:30 p.m.	at Duke	No. 15	Wallace Wade Stadium; Durham, NC	ACCN	W 38–7	40,004
November 16	2:30 p.m.	No. 23 Navy	No. 16	Notre Dame Stadium; Notre Dame, IN (rivalry)	NBC	W 52–20	74,080
November 23	2:30 p.m.	Boston College	No. 16	Notre Dame Stadium; Notre Dame, IN (Holy War)	NBC	W 40–7	71,827
November 30	4:00 p.m.	at Stanford	No. 16	Stanford Stadium; Palo Alto, CA (rivalry)	FOX	W 45–24	37,391
December 28	12:00 p.m.	vs. Iowa State	No. 15	Camping World Stadium; Orlando, FL (Camping World Bowl)	ABC	W 33–9	46,948
Rankings from AP Poll and CFP Rankings after November 5 released prior to game; All times are in Eastern time

== Rankings ==
Ranking movements Legend: ██ Increase in ranking ██ Decrease in ranking
	Week															
Poll	Pre	1	2	3	4	5	6	7	8	9	10	11	12	13	14	Final
AP	9	8	7	7	10	9	9	8	8	16	15	16	15	15	14	12
Coaches	9	8	7	7	10	10	10	8	7	16	15	16	15	15	14	11
CFP	Not released										15	16	16	16	15	Not released

== Personnel ==
2019 Notre Dame Fighting Irish football team roster
Players
Coaches
Offense

Pos.	#	Name	Class
WR	4	Kevin Austin Jr.	So
RB	6	Tony Jones Jr.	Sr
QB	7	Brendon Clark	Fr
RB	8	Jafar Armstrong	Jr
WR	9	Cam Hart	Fr
WR	10	Chris Finke	GS
QB	12	Ian Book	Sr
WR	13	Lawrence Keys III	So
QB	14	J.D. Carney	Jr
QB	15	Phil Jurkovec	So
RB	16	Cameron Ekanayake	Jr
WR	17	Isaiah Robertson	Jr
QB	17	Nolan Henry	Sr
WR	18	Joe Wilkins	So
RB	20	C'Bo Flemister	So
WR	22	Kendall Abdur-Rahman	Fr
RB	23	Kyren Williams	Fr
TE	24	Tommy Tremble	So
WR	25	Braden Lenzy	So
WR	26	Leo Albano	So
WR	27	Arion Shinaver	Sr
WR	29	Matt Salerno	So
QB	31	Cole Capen	So
RB	32	Mick Assaf	Sr
RB	34	Jahmir Smith	So
WR	43	Greg Mailey	So
TE	48	Xavier Lezynski	Sr
TE	49	Jack Henige	Jr
OL	52	Zeke Correll	Fr
OL	53	Quinn Murphy	Fr
OL	55	Jarrett Patterson	So
OL	56	John Dirksen	So
OL	57	Trevor Ruhland	GS
OL	60	Cole Mabry	So
OL	61	Colin Grunhard	Jr
OL	62	Logan Plantz	GS
OL	64	Max Siegel	So
OL	69	Aaron Banks	Jr
OL	71	John Olmstead	Fr
OL	72	Robert Hainsey	Jr
OL	73	Andrew Kristofic	Fr
OL	74	Liam Eichenberg	Sr
OL	75	Josh Lugg	Jr
OL	76	Dillan Gibbons	Jr
OL	77	Quinn Carroll	Fr
OL	78	Tommy Kraemer	Sr
WR	80	Micah Jones	So
TE	81	John Lager	GS
WR	83	Chase Claypool	Sr
TE	84	Cole Kmet	Jr
TE	85	George Takacs	So
WR	86	Conor Ratigan	Fr
WR	87	Michael Young	Jr
WR	88	Javon McKinley	Sr
TE	89	Brock Wright	Jr

Defense

Pos.	#	Name	Class
LB	2	Jordan Genmark Heath	Jr
CB	3	Avery Davis	Jr
DB	3	Houston Griffith	So
CB	5	Troy Pride Jr.	Sr
LB	6	Jeremiah Owusu-Koramoah	Jr
CB	8	Donte Vaughn	Sr
DL	9	Daelin Hayes	Sr
S	11	Alohi Gilman	Sr
DB	12	DJ Brown	So
LB	13	Paul Moala	So
DB	14	Kyle Hamilton	Fr
DB	15	Isaiah Rutherford	Fr
DB	16	KJ Wallace	Fr
DL	18	Nana Osafo-Mensah	Fr
DL	19	Justin Ademilola	So
CB	20	Shaun Crawford	GS
S	21	Jalen Elliott	Sr
LB	22	Asmar Bilal	GS
LB	24	Jack Kiser	Fr
DB	25	John Mahoney	Jr
CB	26	Temitope Agoro	Sr
LB	27	JD Bertrand	Fr
DB	28	TaRiq Bracy	So
DL	29	Ovie Oghoufo	So
DB	30	Chris Velotta	Fr
LB	31	Jack Lamb	So
S	32	Patrick Pelini	Jr
LB	33	Shayne Simon	So
LB	34	Osita Ekwonu	Fr
LB	35	Marist Liufau	Fr
DB	36	Eddie Scheidler	Fr
DB	37	Chase Love	So
S	38	Christopher Schilling	Sr
CB	39	Brandon Garcia	Sr
LB	40	Drew White	Jr
DL	41	Kurt Hinish	Jr
DL	42	Julian Okwara	Sr
DB	43	Marcus Thorne	So
DL	44	Jamir Jones	Sr
LB	45	Jonathan Jones	Sr
DL	47	Kofi Wardlow	Jr
LB	50	Reed Gregory	Jr
LB	52	Bo Bauer	So
DL	53	Khalid Kareem	Sr
DL	54	Jacob Lacey	Fr
DL	56	Howard Cross III	Fr
DL	57	Jayson Ademilola	So
DL	90	Hunter Spears	Fr
DL	91	Adetokunbo Ogundeji	Sr
DL	93	Zane Heemsoth	Fr
DL	94	Isaiah Foskey	Fr
DL	95	Myron Tagovailoa-Amosa	Jr
DL	98	Ja'Mion Franklin	So
DB		Litchfield Ajavon	Fr

Special teams

Pos.	#	Name	Class
P	19	Jay Bramblett	Fr
P	30	Jake Rittman	So
K	39	Jonathan Doerer	Jr
LS	46	Axel Raarup	So
LS	54	John Shannon	Sr
LS	65	Michael Vinson	So
K	98	Harrison Leonard	Fr

Head coach

- Brian Kelly

Coordinators/assistant coaches

- Mike Elston – Associate Head Coach/Defensive Line
- Chip Long – Offensive Coordinator
- Clark Lea – Defensive Coordinator
- Matt Balis – Director of Football Performance
- Todd Lyght – Defensive Backs Coach
- Brian Polian – Recruiting Coordinator/Special Teams Coordinator
- Lance Taylor – Assistant Coach, Running Backs
- Del Alexander – Wide Receivers
- Terry Joseph – Defensive Pass Game Coordinator
- Jeff Quinn – Offensive Line
- Tom Rees – Quarterbacks Coach
- Nick Lezynski – Graduate Assistant (Defense)
- Clay Bignell – Senior Defensive Analyst
- Tyler Plantz – Special Teams Analyst
- Pat Kramer – Offensive Analyst
- Chris O'Leary – Defensive Analyst
- Robert Stiner – Assistant Director of Football Strength & Conditioning
- Beth Rex – Director of Football Administration
- Joy McCausland – Senior Staff Assistant
- Julie DeBuysser – Senior Staff Assistant-Assistant Coaches
- Matt Balis – Director of Football Performance
- David Grimes – Assistant Strength and Conditioning Coach
- Robert Stiner – Assistant Director of Football Strength & Conditioning
- Tim Collins – Director of Football Technology
- Ryan Sehrer – Assistant Video Coordinator
- Rob Hunt – Head Athletic Trainer; Football
- Jacob Flint – Director of Football Strength & Conditioning
- Mike Bean – Associate Athletic Trainer, Football
- Steve Smith – Associate Athletic Trainer; Football
- Ron Powlus – Associate Athletics Director - Football Operations
- Jason Michelson – Director of Football Operations
- Olivia Mitchell – Assistant Director of Football Operations
- David Peloquin – Director of Player Personnel
- Dr. Matt Leiszler – Team Physician
- Aaryn Kearney – Coordinator of Recruiting Operations
- Dr. Brian Ratigan – Orthopedic Surgeon
- David Grimes – Assistant Strength and Conditioning Coach
- Dr. Chris Balint – Orthopedic Surgeon
- Dr. Jerry Hofferth – Chiropractor
- Kari Oliver – Director of Sports Nutrition - Football
- Dan Glynn – Associate Football Equipment Manager
- Tori Hommel – Assistant Athletic Trainer; Football
- Leigh Hullett – Sports Nutrition Associate
- Eric King – Loftus Sports Center - Facility Manager
- Bill Rees – Director of Scouting
- Hunter Bivin – Associate Director of Player Development
- Jacob Flint – Director of Football Strength & Conditioning

Legend

- (C) Team captain
- (S) Suspended
- (I) Ineligible
- Injured
- Redshirt

Roster

== Game summaries ==
=== At Louisville ===
Notre Dame at Louisville

Team	1	2	3	4	Total
• No. 9 Fighting Irish	14	7	7	7	35
Cardinals	14	0	0	3	17

- Date: September 2, 2019
- Location: Cardinal Stadium
  Louisville, KY
- Game start: 8:06 p.m. EDT
- Elapsed time: 3 hours and 21 minutes
- Game attendance: 58,187
- Game weather: Temperature: 83 °F (28 °C) • Weather: Partly Cloudy • Wind: NNE 12 MPH
- Referee: Duane Heydt
- TV announcers (ESPN): Chris Fowler, Kirk Herbstreit and Maria Taylor (sideline)

Scoring summary
1	12:39	ND	Jahmir Smith 3-yard run (Jonathan Doerer kick)	ND 7–0
1	7:27	UofL	Jawon Pass 8-yard run (Blanton Creque kick)	Tied 7–7
1	4:08	UofL	Pass 17-yard run (Creque kick)	UofL 14–7
1	0:29	ND	Tony Jones Jr. 11-yard run (Doerer kick)	Tied 14–14
2	0:17	ND	Ian Book 11-yard run (Doerer kick)	ND 21–14
3	8:06	ND	Tommy Tremble 26-yard pass from Book (Doerer kick)	ND 28–14
4	13:25	UofL	Creque 42-yard field goal	ND 28–17
4	8:15	ND	Smith 1-yard run (Doerer kick)	ND 35–17

=== New Mexico ===
New Mexico at Notre Dame

Team	1	2	3	4	Total
Lobos	0	7	0	7	14
• No. 7 Fighting Irish	7	31	14	14	66

- Date: September 14, 2019
- Location: Notre Dame Stadium
  Notre Dame, IN
- Game start: 2:42 p.m. EDT
- Elapsed time: 3 hours and 23 minutes
- Game attendance: 77,622
- Game weather: Temperature: 75 °F (24 °C) • Weather: Sunny • Wind: W 9 MPH
- Referee: Jeff Maconaghy
- TV announcers (NBC): Mike Tirico, Doug Flutie, Kathryn Tappen (sideline) and Chris Simms (sideline)

Scoring summary
1	10:09	ND	Kyle Hamilton 34-yard Interception return (Jonathan Doerer kick)	ND 7–0
2	11:47	ND	Ian Book 1-yard run (Doerer kick)	ND 14–0
2	6:34	ND	Avery Davis 59-yard pass from Book (Doerer kick)	ND 21–0
2	3:21	ND	Javon McKinley 65-yard pass from Book (Doerer kick)	ND 28–0
2	1:50	ND	Chase Claypool 37-yard pass from Book (Doerer kick)	ND 35–0
2	0:29	UNM	Bryson Carroll 47-yard run (Andrew Shelley kick)	ND 35–7
2	0:00	ND	Doerer 36-yard field goal	ND 38–7
3	13:24	ND	Chris Finke 54-yard pass from Book (Doerer kick)	ND 45–7
3	7:19	ND	McKinley 20-yard pass from Book (Doerer kick)	ND 52–7
4	14:25	ND	C'Bo Flemister 1-yard run (Harrison Leonard kick)	ND 59–7
4	7:14	ND	Braden Lenzy 22-yard pass from Brendan Clark (Leonard kick)	ND 66–7
4	6:26	UNM	Bobby Cole 37-yard run (Shelley kick)	ND 66–14

=== At Georgia ===
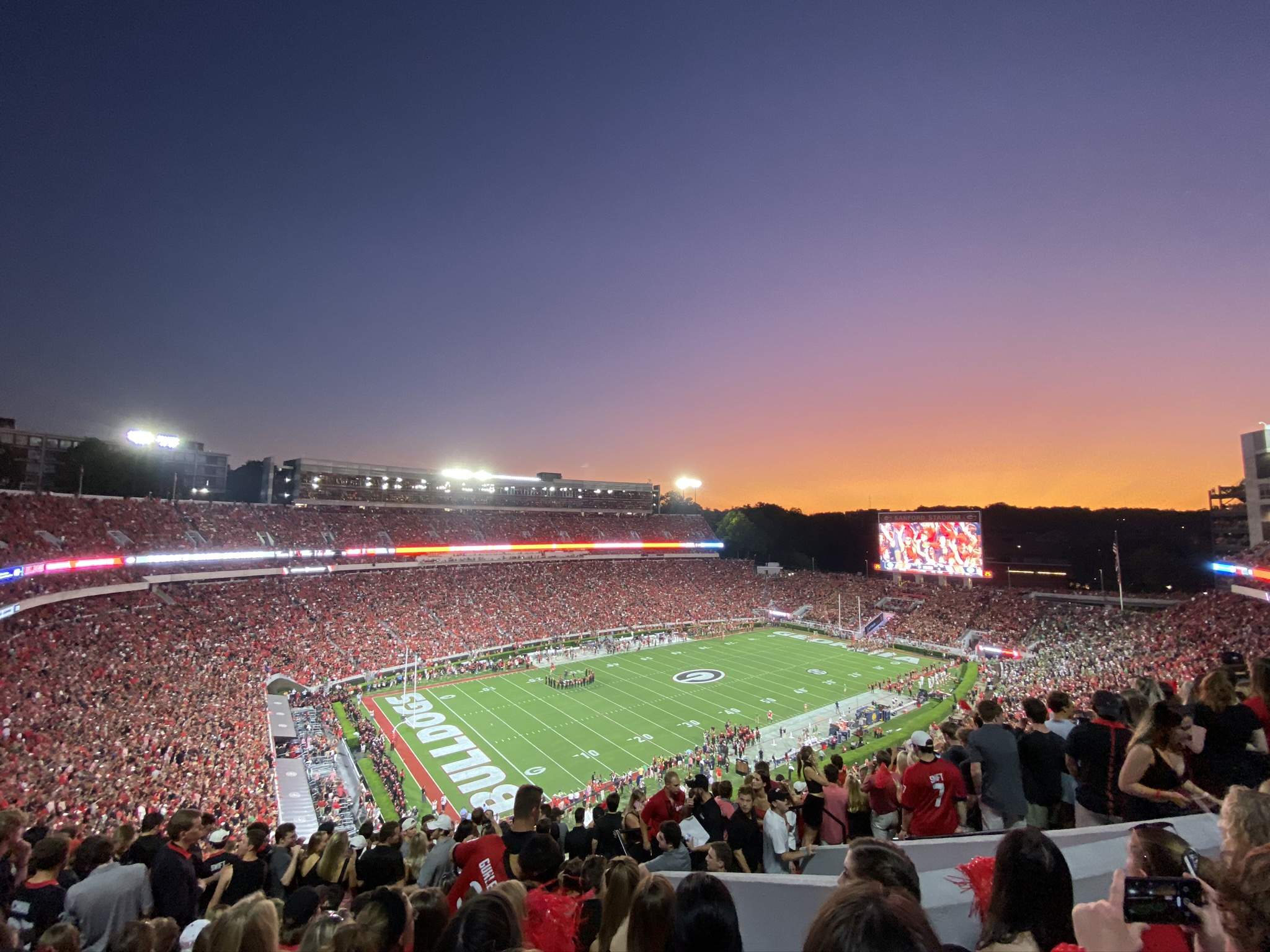
In the latest start time at Sanford Stadium since 1985, the Dawgs defeated #7 Notre Dame 23–17.

Week 4: #7 Notre Dame Fighting Irish at #3 Georgia Bulldogs

Quarter	1	2	3	4	Total
#7 Notre Dame	0	10	0	7	17
#3 Georgia	0	7	6	10	23

at Sanford Stadium, Athens, Georgia

- Date: September 21, 2019
- Game time: 8:00 pm
- Game attendance: 93,246
- TV announcers (CBS): Brad Nessler and Gary Danielson
- Recap, Box Score

Game information

First quarter

- No scoring plays.

Second quarter

- ND – Cole Kmet 1-yard pass from Ian Book (Jonathan Doerer kick), 10:39. #7 Notre Dame 7–0. Drive: 5 plays, 8 yards, 1:43.
- UGA – D'Andre Swift 3-yard run (Rodrigo Blankenship kick), 2:27. Tied 7–7. Drive: 13 plays, 75 yards, 8:12.
- ND – Jonathan Doerer 27-yard field goal, 0:00. #7 Notre Dame 10–7. Drive: 8 plays, 66 yards, 2:27.

Third quarter

- UGA – Rodrigo Blankenship 40-yard field goal, 8:31. Tied 10–10. Drive: 4 plays, -1 yard, 1:27.
- UGA – Rodrigo Blankenship 31-yard field goal, 4:21. #3 Georgia 13–10. Drive: 7 plays, 53 yards, 2:36.

Fourth quarter

- UGA – Lawrence Cager 15-yard pass from Jake Fromm (Rodrigo Blankenship kick), 13:19. #3 Georgia 20–10. Drive: 8 plays, 82 yards, 3:59.
- UGA – Rodrigo Blankenship 43-yard field goal, 6:54. #3 Georgia 23–10. Drive: 7 plays, 41 yards, 4:17.
- ND – Chase Claypool 4-yard pass from Ian Book (Jonathan Doerer kick), 3:12. #3 Georgia 23–17. Drive: 10 plays, 75 yards, 3:42.

Top passers

- ND – Ian Book – 29/47, 275 yards, 2 TD, 2 INT
- UGA – Jake Fromm – 20/26, 187 yards, TD

Top rushers

- ND – Tony Jones Jr. – 9 rushes, 21 yards
- UGA – D'Andre Swift – 18 rushes, 98 yards, TD

Top receivers

- ND – Cole Kmet – 9 receptions, 108 yards, TD
- UGA – Lawrence Cager – 5 receptions, 82 yards, TD

=== Virginia ===
Virginia at Notre Dame

Team	1	2	3	4	Total
No. 18 Cavaliers	7	10	0	3	20
• No. 10 Fighting Irish	14	0	14	7	35

- Date: September 28, 2019
- Location: Notre Dame Stadium
  Notre Dame, IN
- Game start: 3:42 p.m. EDT
- Elapsed time: 3 hours and 24 minutes
- Game attendance: 77,622
- Game weather: Temperature: 70 °F (21 °C) • Weather: Cloudy • Wind: N 7 MPH
- Referee: Gary Patterson
- TV announcers (NBC): Mike Tirico, Doug Flutie, Kathryn Tappen (sideline) and Chris Simms (sideline)

=== Bowling Green ===
Bowling Green at Notre Dame

Team	1	2	3	4	Total
Falcons	0	0	0	0	0
• No. 9 Fighting Irish	21	14	10	7	52

- Date: October 5, 2019
- Location: Notre Dame Stadium
  Notre Dame, IN
- Game start: 3:42 p.m. EDT
- Elapsed time: 2 hours and 51 minutes
- Game attendance: 77,622
- Game weather: Temperature: 62 °F (17 °C) • Weather: Mostly Sunny • Wind: SE 10 MPH
- Referee: Jerry Magallanes
- TV announcers (NBC): Mike Tirico, Doug Flutie, Kathryn Tappen (sideline) and Chris Simms (sideline)

=== USC ===
USC at Notre Dame
(Jeweled Shillelagh)

Team	1	2	3	4	Total
Trojans	3	0	10	14	27
• No. 9 Fighting Irish	0	17	3	10	30

- Date: October 12, 2019
- Location: Notre Dame Stadium
  Notre Dame, IN
- Game start: 7:42 p.m. EDT
- Elapsed time: 3 hours and 16 minutes
- Game attendance: 77,622
- Game weather: Temperature: 51 °F (11 °C) • Weather: Clear and Cooling • Wind: S 13 MPH
- Referee: Michael Mothershed
- TV announcers (NBC): Mike Tirico, Doug Flutie, Kathryn Tappen (sideline) and Chris Simms (sideline)

=== At Michigan ===
Notre Dame at Michigan
(rivalry)

Team	1	2	3	4	Total
No. 8 Fighting Irish	0	0	7	7	14
• No. 19 Wolverines	3	14	7	21	45

- Date: October 26, 2019
- Location: Michigan Stadium
  Ann Arbor, MI
- Game start: 7:44 p.m. EDT
- Elapsed time: 3 hours and 31 minutes
- Game attendance: 111,909
- Game weather: Temperature: High 40s • Weather: Rain • Wind: SE 10–20 MPH
- Referee: John O'Neill
- TV announcers (ABC): Chris Fowler, Kirk Herbstreit and Maria Taylor (sideline)

Notre Dame was routed by No. 19 Michigan 45–14, snapping an 8-game losing streak to top 10 teams for the Wolverines. The loss, combined with the loss to Georgia earlier in the season, ended Notre Dame's hopes to qualify for the playoffs.

=== Virginia Tech ===
Virginia Tech at Notre Dame

Team	1	2	3	4	Total
Hokies	7	7	3	3	20
• No. 16 Fighting Irish	7	7	0	7	21

- Date: November 2, 2019
- Location: Notre Dame Stadium
  Notre Dame, IN
- Game start: 2:41 p.m. EDT
- Elapsed time: 3 hours and 34 minutes
- Game attendance: 77,622
- Game weather: Temperature: 41 °F (5 °C) • Weather: Mostly Cloudy • Wind: SW 15–20 MPH
- Referee: Jeff Heaser
- TV announcers (NBC): Mike Tirico, Doug Flutie, Kathryn Tappen (sideline) and Chris Simms (sideline)

After poor performances against USC and Michigan, Notre Dame stepped up defensively against Virginia Tech. The hokies were held to their lowest total yards game since 2015 and lowest yards per play since 2016 in what was billed as "one of the best group effort performances" ever seen by Sports Illustrated sportswriter Bryan Driskell. Yet, Notre Dame still needed a late touchdown to win the game by a final score 21–20 and Notre Dame extended their home winning streak to 16 games.

After this win, ESPN analysts Kyle Bonagura and Mark Schlabach both projected that Notre Dame will play Kansas State in the Camping World Bowl on December 28 in Orlando, Florida as a part of their Week 10 predictions Notre Dame (ranked #15 after this week) "did not exactly play an inspired game in a come-from-behind win over Virginia Tech" according to ESPN Analyst Andrea Adelson. However, Notre Dame is projected for a ten-win season.

=== At Duke ===
Notre Dame at Duke

Team	1	2	3	4	Total
• No. 15 Fighting Irish	14	7	7	10	38
Blue Devils	0	7	0	0	7

- Date: November 9, 2019
- Location: Wallace Wade Stadium
  Durham, NC
- Game start: 7:30 p.m. EST
- Elapsed time: 3 hours and 19 minutes
- Game attendance: 40,004
- Game weather: Temperature: 35 °F (2 °C) • Weather: Clear and Cold • Wind: Calm
- Referee: Duane Heydt
- TV announcers (ACCN): Dave O'Brien, Tim Hasselbeck and Katie George (sideline)

=== Navy ===
Navy at Notre Dame
(Rip Miller Trophy)

Team	1	2	3	4	Total
No. 23 Midshipmen	0	3	7	10	20
• No. 16 Fighting Irish	14	24	7	7	52

- Date: November 16, 2019
- Location: Notre Dame Stadium
  Notre Dame, IN
- Game start: 2:42 p.m. EST
- Elapsed time: 3 hours and 5 minutes
- Game attendance: 74,080
- Game weather: Temperature: 37 °F (3 °C) • Weather: Clear skies • Wind: E 8 MPH
- Referee: Charles Lambertina
- TV announcers (NBC): Mike Tirico, Doug Flutie, Kathryn Tappen (sideline) and Chris Simms (sideline)

=== Boston College ===
Boston College at Notre Dame
(Holy War)

Team	1	2	3	4	Total
Eagles	0	7	0	0	7
• No. 16 Fighting Irish	3	13	17	7	40

- Date: November 23, 2019
- Location: Notre Dame Stadium
  Notre Dame, IN
- Game start: 2:41 p.m. EST
- Elapsed time: 3 hours and 12 minutes
- Game attendance: 71,827
- Game weather: Temperature: 35 °F (2 °C) • Weather: Chance of Rain and Snow • Wind: W 7 MPH
- Referee: Stuart Mullins
- TV announcers (NBC): Mike Tirico, Doug Flutie, Kathryn Tappen (sideline) and Chris Simms (sideline)

=== At Stanford ===
Notre Dame at Stanford
(Legends Trophy)

Team	1	2	3	4	Total
• No. 16 Fighting Irish	7	14	7	17	45
Cardinal	10	7	0	7	24

- Date: November 30, 2019
- Location: Stanford Stadium
  Palo Alto, CA
- Game start: 1:04 p.m. PST
- Elapsed time: 3 hours and 29 minutes
- Game attendance: 37,391
- Game weather: Temperature: 48 °F (9 °C) • Weather: Cloudy and Showers • Wind: SE 20 MPH
- Referee: Gary Patterson
- TV announcers (Fox): Tim Brando, Spencer Tillman and Coley Harvey (sideline)

=== Vs. Iowa State (Camping World Bowl) ===
Notre Dame vs. Iowa State
(Camping World Bowl)

Team	1	2	3	4	Total
• No. 14 Fighting Irish	10	10	10	3	33
Cyclones	0	6	3	0	9

- Date: December 28, 2019
- Location: Camping World Stadium
  Orlando, FL
- Game start: 12:00 p.m. EST
- Elapsed time: 3 hours and 6 minutes
- Game attendance: 46,948
- Game weather: Temperature: 75 °F (24 °C) • Weather: Overcast • Wind: ESE 10 MPH
- Referee: David Smith
- TV announcers (ABC): Bob Wischusen, Dan Orlovsky and Allison Williams (sideline)

Scoring summary
1	9:29	ND	Jonathan Doerer 39-yard field goal	ND 3–0
1	3:20	ND	Chase Claypool 37-yard pass from Ian Book (Doerer kick)	ND 10–0
2	9:27	ISU	Connor Assalley 41-yard field goal	ND 10–3
2	7:23	ND	Jonathan Doerer 51-yard field goal	ND 13–3
2	2:25	ND	Jafar Armstrong 1-yard run (Doerer kick)	ND 20–3
2	0:50	ISU	Connor Assalley 26-yard field goal	ND 20–6
3	13:14	ND	Tony Jones 84-yard run (Doerer kick)	ND 27–6
3	4:58	ISU	Connor Assalley 42-yard field goal	ND 27–9
3	0:15	ND	Jonathan Doerer 19-yard field goal	ND 30–9
4	3:53	ND	Jonathan Doerer 39-yard field goal	ND 33–9

== Players drafted into the NFL ==
Round	Pick	Player	Position	NFL club
2	43	Cole Kmet	TE	Chicago Bears
2	49	Chase Claypool	WR	Pittsburgh Steelers
3	67	Julian Okwara	DE	Detroit Lions
4	113	Troy Pride	CB	Carolina Panthers
5	147	Khalid Kareem	DE	Cincinnati Bengals
6	186	Alohi Gilman	S	Los Angeles Chargers
