= Claypool =

Claypool may refer to:

== Places ==
In the United States:

- Claypool, Arizona
- Claypool, Indiana
- Claypool, Logan County, West Virginia
- Claypool, Summers County, West Virginia

== Other uses ==
- Claypool (surname)
- Claypool Comics
