= 2019 Camping World Bowl =

American college football game

- 30th Camping World Bowl
Notre Dame Fighting Irish	Iowa State Cyclones
(10–2)	(7–5)
Independent	Big 12
33	9
Head coach: Brian Kelly	Head coach: Matt Campbell
AP / Coaches / CFP; 14 / 14 / 15
	1	2	3	4	Total
Notre Dame	10	10	10	3	33
Iowa State	0	6	3	0	9
- Date: December 28, 2019
- Season: 2019
- Stadium: Camping World Stadium
- Location: Orlando, Florida
- MVP: Chase Claypool (WR, Notre Dame)
- Favorite: Notre Dame by 3.5
- Referee: David Smith (SEC)
- Attendance: 46,948
- Payout: US$6,071,760

United States TV coverage
- Network: ABC & ESPN Radio
- Announcers: ABC: Bob Wischusen (play-by-play), Dan Orlovsky (analyst) and Allison Williams (sideline); ESPN Radio: Dave Flemming (play-by-play), Tim Hasselbeck (analyst) and Katie George (sideline)

The 2019 Camping World Bowl was a college football bowl game played on December 28, 2019, with kickoff at 12:00 p.m. EST on ABC. It was the 30th edition of the Camping World Bowl and was one of the 2019–20 bowl games concluding the 2019 FBS football season. The game was sponsored by recreational vehicle company Camping World.

== Teams ==
The game matched the Notre Dame Fighting Irish, an FBS independent and the Iowa State Cyclones from the Big 12 Conference. This was the first meeting between the two programs.

=== Notre Dame Fighting Irish ===
Notre Dame entered the game with a 10–2 record, ranked 14th in the AP Poll. The Fighting Irish split their four games against ranked teams, defeating Virginia and Navy while losing to Georgia and Michigan. This was Notre Dame's second Camping World Bowl; their 2011 team appeared in the then-Champs Sports Bowl, losing to Florida State, 18–14.

=== Iowa State Cyclones ===
Iowa State entered the game with a 7–5 record (5–4 in conference). The Cyclones finished in a four-way tie for third place in the Big 12. They played three ranked FBS teams during the regular season, defeating Texas while losing to Iowa and Oklahoma.

== Game summary ==
2019 Camping World Bowl

Quarter	1	2	3	4	Total
No. 15 Notre Dame	10	10	10	3	33
Iowa State	0	6	3	0	9

at Camping World Stadium • Orlando, Florida

- Date: Saturday, December 28, 2019
- Game time: 12:00 p.m. EST
- Game weather: Overcast • Temperature: 75 °F (24 °C) • Wind: ESE 10 mph
- Game attendance: 46,948
- Referee: David Smith
- TV announcers (ABC): Bob Wischusen (play-by-play), Dan Orlovsky (analyst) and Allison Williams (sideline)
- ESPN game summary

Game information

First Quarter

- (9:29) ND – Jonathan Doerer 39 yard field goal (Drive: 8 plays, 21 yards, 4:10; Notre Dame 3–0)
- (3:20) ND – Ian Book 24 yard pass to Chase Claypool, Jonathan Doerer kick (Drive: 8 plays, 58 yards, 3:43; Notre Dame 10–0)

Second Quarter

- (9:27) ISU – Connor Assalley 41 yard field goal (Drive: 7 plays, 43 yards, 2:46; Notre Dame 10–3)
- (7:23) ND – Jonathan Doerer 51 yard field goal (Drive: 5 plays, 32 yards, 2:04; Notre Dame 13–3)
- (2:25) ND – Jafar Armstrong 1 yard rush, Jonathan Doerer kick (Drive: 4 plays, 45 yards, 1:30; Notre Dame 20–3)
- (0:50) ISU – Connor Assalley 26 yard field goal (Drive: 8 plays, 67 yards, 1:35; Notre Dame 20–6)

Third Quarter

- (13:14) ND – Tony Jones 84 yard rush, Jonathan Doerer kick (Drive: 1 play, 84 yards, 0:15; Notre Dame 27–6)
- (4:58) ISU – Connor Assalley 42 yard field goal (Drive: 10 plays, 55 yards, 4:33; Notre Dame 27–9)
- (0:15) ND – Jonathan Doerer 19 yard field goal (Drive: 13 plays, 74 yards, 4:43; Notre Dame 30–9)

Fourth Quarter

- (3:53) ND – Jonathan Doerer 39 yard field goal (Drive: 9 plays, 28 yards, 4:51; Notre Dame 33–9)

=== Statistics ===
Statistics	ND	ISU
First downs	17	14
Plays–yards	65–455	59–272
Rushes–yards	37–208	27–45
Passing yards	247	227
Passing: comp–att–int	20–28–0	18–32–0
Time of possession	32:48	27:12

Team	Category	Player	Statistics
Notre Dame	Passing	Ian Book	20/28, 247 yards, 1 TD
Notre Dame	Rushing	Tony Jones	11 carries, 135 yards, 1 TD
Notre Dame	Receiving	Chase Claypool	7 receptions, 146 yards, 1 TD
Iowa State	Passing	Brock Purdy	17/30, 222 yards
Iowa State	Rushing	Breece Hall	17 carries, 55 yards
Iowa State	Receiving	La'Michael Pettway	4 receptions, 54 yards
