= Phil Jurkovec =

American football player (born 1999)

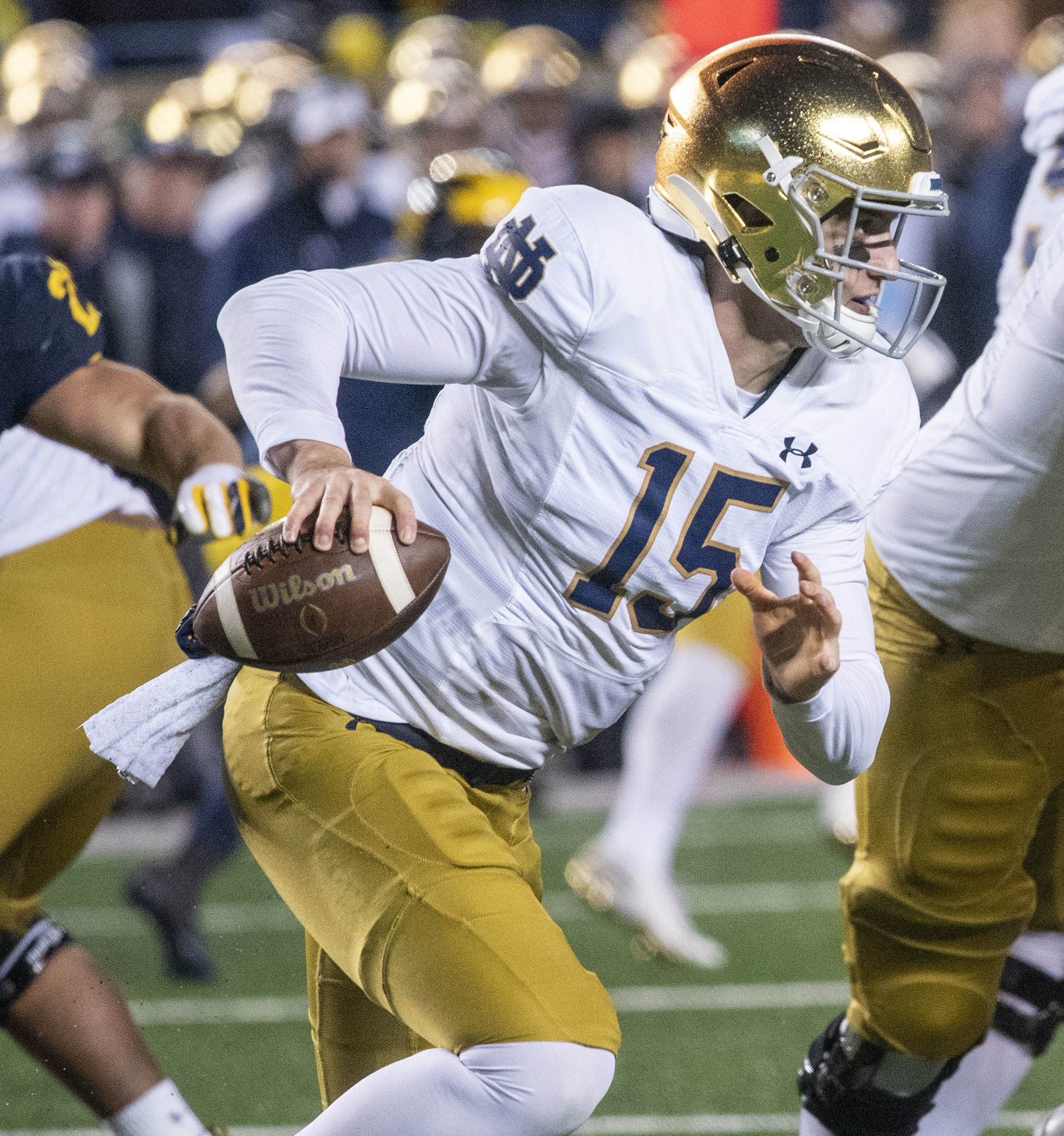
- Jurkovec with Notre Dame in 2019

No. 15, 5
- Position: Quarterback / Tight end

Personal information
- Born: November 3, 1999 (age 27); Pittsburgh, Pennsylvania, U.S.
- Listed height: 6 ft 5 in (1.96 m)
- Listed weight: 235 lb (107 kg)

Career information
- High school: Pine-Richland (Gibsonia, Pennsylvania)
- College: Notre Dame (2018–2019); Boston College (2020–2022); Pittsburgh (2023)
- NFL draft: 2024: undrafted

Philip Stephen Jurkovec (born November 3, 1999) is an American former college football player who was a quarterback and tight end for the Notre Dame Fighting Irish, Boston College Eagles, and Pittsburgh Panthers.

== Early life ==
Jurkovec attended Pine-Richland High School in Gibsonia, Pennsylvania. He took over as quarterback at Pine-Richland after senior Ben DiNucci graduated in 2015. During his high school career, he had 11,144 total yards, 8,202 passing yards, and 71 touchdown passes. As a senior, he played in the 2018 U.S. Army All-American Bowl and was the Pittsburgh Post-Gazette Player of the Year. Jurkovec committed to the University of Notre Dame to play college football.

== College career ==
=== Notre Dame ===
In 2018, Jurkovec made his college football debut for Notre Dame against Wake Forest. He came in late in the fourth quarter as Notre Dame was up 56–27 over Sam Hartman and Jamie Newman. He attempted two passes and did not complete either, he also ran once for seven yards to finish his only appearance of the year. The team went on to play, and subsequently lose to Clemson, in the Cotton Bowl Classic.

In 2019, Jurkovec appeared in six games for the Fighting Irish. His first appearance came against New Mexico in week two. He went one for two for 52 yards while rushing three times for seventeen yards as Notre Dame won 66–14. He had a career-high seven pass attempts and his first career touchdown pass against Bowling Green. He finished the team's 52–0 win going five for seven for 79 yards and a touchdown. On the ground he also ran for 42 yards on four carries. After not playing against USC the following week he threw his second career touchdown pass against Michigan. Despite the team losing 14–45, Jurkovec came in relief for Book and completed 75 percent of his passes for sixty yards and a half of the team's points. He finished the year out playing sparingly against Duke, Navy, Boston College, and Iowa State in the Camping World Bowl. On January 8, 2020, Jurkovec entered the transfer portal.

=== Boston College ===
On January 11, 2020, Jurkovec transferred to Boston College to join first-year head coach Jeff Hafley. Upon arrival he was named starter and remained in the position as he started ten games for the Eagles. He made his debut for Boston College against Duke. His first drive with the team ended in a touchdown run from David Bailey. Jurkovec would finish the game going seventeen for 23 for 300 yards, two touchdowns, and an interception as they won 26–6. After throwing for 300 yards against Duke, North Carolina, Pittsburgh, and Virginia Tech he became the first player in Boston College history to have four 300-yard passing games in their first five career starts, while also being the first quarterback to have four or more 300-yard games in an entire season since Matt Ryan. He had a career-high 358 passing yards, three touchdowns, and a longest touchdown pass of 77 yards in an overtime win over Pittsburgh. Against Louisville, he started fifteen of nineteen for 203 yards before exiting the game with a lower leg injury that would cause him to miss the final game of the season.

In 2021, Jurkovec started the first two games of the season against FCS opponent Colgate and UMass. Against Colgate he threw for 303 yards and his season-high of three touchdown passes. Early against UMass the following week he completed three of his first four pass attempts for 22 yards before exiting the game with a hand injury. Jurkovec would receive surgery for his hand which caused to miss the next six games. Despite seeming unlikely to return at the beginning of the season, Jurkovec managed to return to the starting lineup for the team's game against Virginia Tech. In his return the team threw sparingly as he only managed seven completions on thirteen attempts for 112 yards and an interception. Despite that the team won 17–3. The following week against Georgia Tech, Jurkovec appeared back to his former self as he threw for 310 yards on thirteen completions in twenty attempts alongside 310 passing yards. After that performance he earned ACC Quarterback of the Week, PFF National QB of the Week, and one of eight Manning Award Stars of the Week. The team would lose back-to-back games against Florida State and Wake Forest, as Wake Forest held Jurkovec to 19 yards on three completions in eleven attempts, alongside two interceptions and a total of ten team points. The team's Military Bowl bid against East Carolina was canceled due to COVID-19.

=== Pittsburgh ===
On December 5, 2022, Jurkovec announced he is transferring to Pittsburgh. He was benched as starting quarterback on October 4, 2023. On October 5, 2023, Jurkovec switched his position to tight end.

=== Statistics ===
Year	Team	Games			Passing								Rushing			
Year	Team	GP	GS	Record	Comp	Att	Pct	Yards	Avg	TD	Int	Rate	Att	Yards	Avg	TD
2018	Notre Dame	2	0	0–0	0	2	0.0	0	0.0	0	0	0.0	2	9	4.5	0
2019	Notre Dame	6	0	0–0	12	16	75.0	222	13.9	2	0	232.8	22	130	5.9	0
2020	Boston College	10	10	6–4	205	336	61.0	2,558	7.6	17	5	138.7	77	150	1.9	3
2021	Boston College	6	6	4–2	52	96	54.2	914	9.5	7	4	149.9	50	322	6.4	5
2022	Boston College	8	8	2–6	147	247	59.5	1,711	6.9	11	7	125.9	68	−43	−0.6	1
2023	Pittsburgh	6	5	1–4	57	112	50.9	818	7.3	6	3	124.6	39	60	1.5	1
Career		38	29	13–16	473	808	58.5	6,223	7.7	43	20	135.8	258	628	2.4	10

== Professional career ==
In May 2024, Jurkovec was invited to Pittsburgh Steelers' minicamp. He was not signed to a contract after the minicamp.

== Personal life ==
Jurkovec is the son of Jim and Sara Jurkovec.

On September 18, 2026, Jurkovec was arrested in Wexford, PA after allegedly stealing a rental box truck from Allegheny Health Network's Wexford Hospital. He was charged with Theft by Unlawful Taking and Receiving Stolen Property.
