= Claypool, West Virginia =

Claypool, West Virginia may refer to the following communities in West Virginia:

- Claypool, Logan County, West Virginia
- Claypool, Summers County, West Virginia
