= Howard Cross III =

American football player (born 2001)

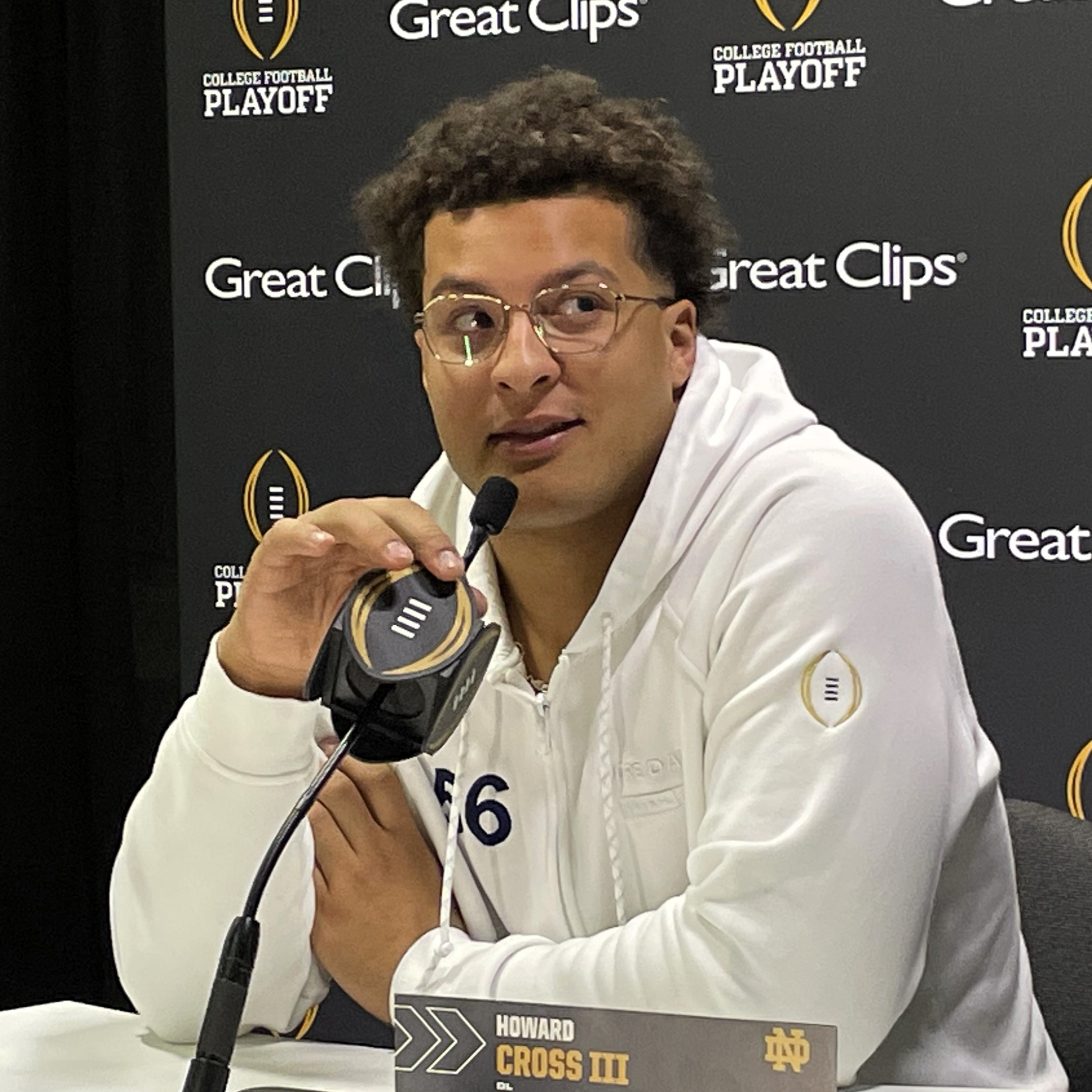
- Cross talking to press ahead of the 2025 CFP National Championship.

No. 95 – Cincinnati Bengals
- Position: Defensive tackle
- Roster status: Practice squad

Personal information
- Born: July 31, 2001 (age 25); Paramus, New Jersey, U.S.
- Listed height: 6 ft 1 in (1.85 m)
- Listed weight: 285 lb (129 kg)

Career information
- High school: Saint Joseph Regional (Montvale, New Jersey)
- College: Notre Dame (2019–2024)
- NFL draft: 2025: undrafted

Career history
- Cincinnati Bengals (2025–present)

Career NFL statistics
- Tackles: 1
- Stats at Pro Football Reference

Howard Edward Cross III (born July 31, 2001) is an American professional football defensive tackle for the Cincinnati Bengals of the National Football League (NFL). He played college football for the Notre Dame Fighting Irish.

== Early life ==
Cross was born in Paramus, New Jersey and attended Saint Joseph Regional High School, where he was a state-champion wrestler. He committed to play college football at the University of Notre Dame.

== College career ==
As a freshman in 2019, Cross totaled seven tackles in four games. In the shortened 2020 season, he recorded 13 tackles. In week 12 of the 2021 season, Cross notched two sacks in a win over Georgia Tech. He finished the season with 22 tackles with 4.5 being for a loss, and three sacks.

In week 2 of the 2022 season, Cross recorded 11 tackles with half a tackle being for a loss in a loss to Marshall. He finished the season with 33 tackles with 2.5 going for a loss, two sacks, a pass deflection, and a forced fumble. Cross earned the starting nose tackle spot ahead of the 2023 season. In week 5 of the 2023 season, he tallied 13 tackles with 3.5 going for a loss, a sack, and two forced fumbles in a win over Duke. Cross was named a midseason All-American, by ESPN after eight weeks of the 2023 season.

=== Statistics ===
Year	Team	Games		Tackles				Interceptions				Fumbles		
Year	Team	GP	GS	Total	Solo	Ast	Sack	PD	Int	Yds	TD	FF	FR	TD
2019	Notre Dame	4	0	7	3	4	0.0	0	0	0	0	0	0	0
2020	Notre Dame	12	0	13	8	5	0.0	0	0	0	0	0	0	0
2021	Notre Dame	12	2	22	13	9	3.0	0	0	0	0	0	0	0
2022	Notre Dame	12	7	33	14	19	2.0	1	0	0	0	1	0	0
2023	Notre Dame	13	13	66	28	38	2.0	2	0	0	0	2	0	0
2024	Notre Dame	13	13	28	14	14	4.0	1	0	0	0	0	0	0
Career		66	35	169	80	89	11.0	4	0	0	0	3	0	0

== Professional career ==
Pre-draft measurables
Height	Weight	Arm length	Hand span	Wingspan	20-yard shuttle	Three-cone drill	Vertical jump	Broad jump	Bench press
6 ft 1 3/8 in (1.86 m)	285 lb (129 kg)	32 1/4 in (0.82 m)	10 1/2 in (0.27 m)	6 ft 6 5/8 in (2.00 m)	4.63 s	7.41 s	31.5 in (0.80 m)	8 ft 11 in (2.72 m)	24 reps
All values from NFL Combine/Pro Day

On May 9, 2025, Cross signed with the Cincinnati Bengals as an undrafted free agent after going unselected in the 2025 NFL draft. Reuniting him with defensive coordinator Al Golden who was his defensive coordinator at Notre Dame. He was waived on October 3 and re-signed to the practice squad four days later.

Cross signed a reserve/future contract with Cincinnati on January 5, 2026. On August 30, Cross was waived by the Bengals as a part of final roster cuts; he was re-signed to the team's practice squad the next day.

== Personal life ==
Cross is the son of former New York Giants tight end Howard Cross. He has a twin sister, Bella.
