= Marist Liufau =

American football player (born 2001)

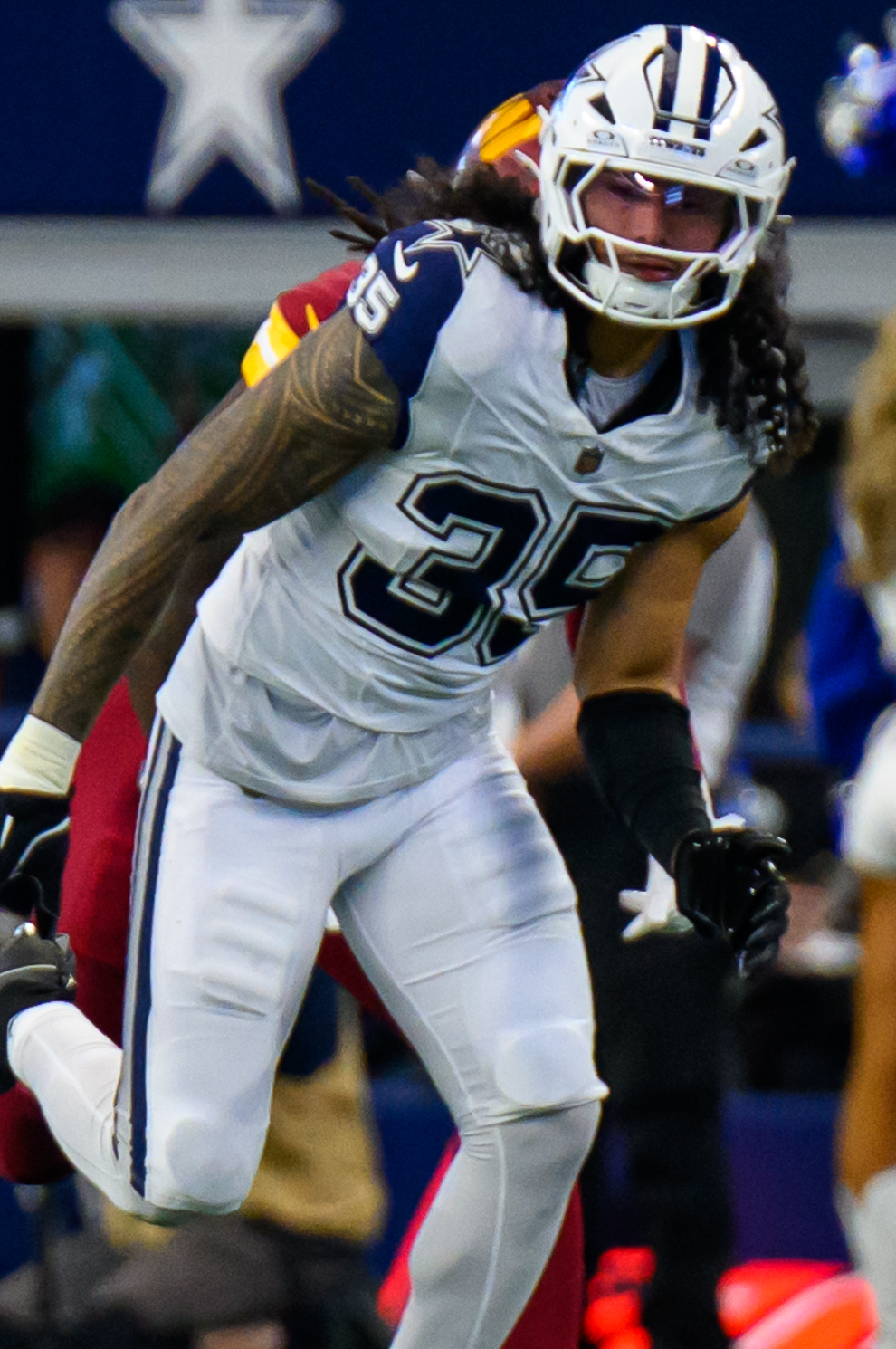
- Liufau with the Dallas Cowboys in 2025

No. 35 – Dallas Cowboys
- Position: Outside linebacker
- Roster status: Active

Personal information
- Born: February 9, 2001 (age 25); Kalihi, Hawaii, U.S.
- Listed height: 6 ft 2 in (1.88 m)
- Listed weight: 238 lb (108 kg)

Career information
- High school: Punahou (Honolulu, Hawaii)
- College: Notre Dame (2019–2023)
- NFL draft: 2024: 3rd round, 87th overall pick

Career history
- Dallas Cowboys (2024–present)

Career NFL statistics as of 2025
- Total tackles: 80
- Sacks: 2.5
- Forced fumbles: 3
- Fumble recoveries: 1
- Pass deflections: 3
- Stats at Pro Football Reference

Marist Lealofi Liufau (born February 9, 2001) is an American professional football outside linebacker for the Dallas Cowboys of the National Football League (NFL). He played college football for the Notre Dame Fighting Irish.

== Early life ==
Liufau attended Punahou School in Honolulu, Hawaii. He was selected to play in the 2019 Polynesian Bowl. He committed to the University of Notre Dame to play college football.

== College career ==
In his first season at Notre Dame in 2019, Liufau appeared in four games and in 2020 he started three of 10 games and had 22 tackles and 0.5 sacks. He missed the 2021 season after suffering an ankle injury in practice. Liufau returned from the injury in 2022 to start all 13 games and finished with 51 tackles, 0.5 sacks and an interception. As a senior in 2023, he started all 12 games he played in, recording 44 tackles and three sacks. Liufau opted out of the 2023 Sun Bowl and entered the 2024 NFL draft.

== Professional career ==
Pre-draft measurables
Height	Weight	Arm length	Hand span	Wingspan	40-yard dash	10-yard split	20-yard split	20-yard shuttle	Three-cone drill	Vertical jump	Broad jump	Bench press
6 ft 2 1/8 in (1.88 m)	234 lb (106 kg)	34 1/4 in (0.87 m)	9 7/8 in (0.25 m)	6 ft 7 3/8 in (2.02 m)	4.64 s	1.59 s	2.72 s	4.18 s	7.14 s	30.0 in (0.76 m)	9 ft 0 in (2.74 m)	16 reps
All values from NFL Combine/Pro Day

Liufau was drafted by the Dallas Cowboys in the third round with the 87th overall selection in the 2024 NFL draft.

On August 30, 2026, Liufau was placed on injured reserve after suffering a fractured forearm in the preseason. He was activated on November 7.

== Career statistics ==
=== NFL ===
Legend
**Bold**	Career high

Year	Team	Games		Tackles						Interceptions						Fumbles		
Year	Team	GP	GS	Total	Solo	Ast	Sck	TFL	Sfty	PD	Int	Yds	Avg	Lng	TD	FF	FR	TD
2024	DAL	17	9	**50**	**30**	**20**	**1.5**	**4**	0	**3**	0	0	0.0	0	0	**2**	**1**	0
2025	DAL	17	5	30	17	13	1.0	1	0	0	0	0	0.0	0	0	1	0	0
Career		34	14	80	47	33	2.5	5	0	3	0	0	0.0	0	0	3	1	0

=== College ===
Year	Team	Games		Tackles				Interceptions				Fumbles		
Year	Team	GP	GS	Total	Solo	Ast	Sack	PD	Int	Yds	TD	FF	FR	TD
2019	Notre Dame	4	0	0	0	0	0.0	0	0	0	0	0	0	0
2020	Notre Dame	10	3	22	10	12	0.5	0	0	0	0	0	1	0
2021	Notre Dame	0	0	DNP										
2022	Notre Dame	13	13	51	22	29	0.5	1	1	0	0	0	1	0
2023	Notre Dame	12	12	44	23	21	3.0	2	0	0	0	1	1	0
Career		39	28	117	55	62	4.0	3	1	0	0	1	3	0

== Personal life ==
Liufau is the cousin of Los Angeles Rams wide receiver Puka Nacua.

Liufau is dating WNBA star guard, and former Notre Dame Fighting Irish, Sonia Citron.
