= 2019 Iowa State Cyclones football team =

American college football season

2019 Iowa State Cyclones football

Camping World Bowl, L 9–33 vs. Notre Dame
- Conference: Big 12 Conference
- Record: 7–6 (5–4 Big 12)
- Head coach: Matt Campbell (4th season)
- Offensive coordinator: Tom Manning (3rd season)
- Offensive scheme: Pro spread
- Defensive coordinator: Jon Heacock (4th season)
- Base defense: 3-high safety
- Home stadium: Jack Trice Stadium

Uniform
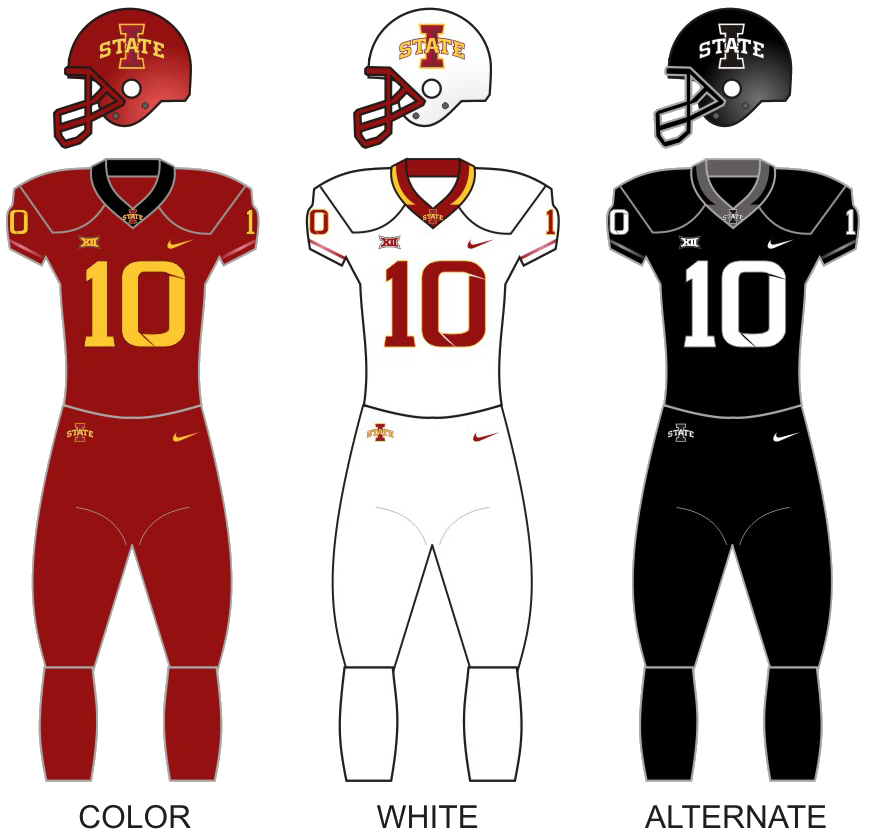

2019 Big 12 Conference football standings
	Conf.			Overall
Team	W		L	W		L
No. 7 Oklahoma y$^	8	–	1	12	–	2
No. 13 Baylor y	8	–	1	11	–	3
No. 25 Texas	5	–	4	8	–	5
Oklahoma State	5	–	4	8	–	5
Kansas State	5	–	4	8	–	5
Iowa State	5	–	4	7	–	6
West Virginia	3	–	6	5	–	7
TCU	3	–	6	5	–	7
Texas Tech	2	–	7	4	–	8
Kansas	1	–	8	3	–	9
Championship: Oklahoma 30, Baylor 23 ^{OT}
^ – College Football Playoff participant; $ – Conference champion; y – Championship game participant; Rankings from AP Poll

The 2019 Iowa State Cyclones football team represented Iowa State University as a member of Big 12 Conference during the 2019 NCAA Division I FBS football season. Led by fourth-year head coach Matt Campbell, the Cyclones compiled an overall record of 7–6 with a mark of 5–4 in conference play, placing in a four-way tie for third in the Big 12. Iowa State was invited to the Camping World Bowl, where the Cyclones lost to Notre Dame. The team played home games at Jack Trice Stadium in Ames, Iowa.

== Schedule ==
Date	Time	Opponent	Rank	Site	TV	Result	Attendance
August 31	11:00 a.m.	No. 18 (FCS) Northern Iowa*	No. 21	Jack Trice Stadium; Ames, IA	FS1	W 29–26 ^{3OT}	61,500
September 14	3:00 p.m.	No. 19 Iowa*		Jack Trice Stadium; Ames, IA (rivalry,College GameDay)	FS1	L 17–18	61,500
September 21	11:00 a.m.	Louisiana–Monroe*		Jack Trice Stadium; Ames, IA	FS1	W 72–20	57,442
September 28	2:30 p.m.	at Baylor		McLane Stadium; Waco, TX	ESPN	L 21–23	42,359
October 5	1:00 p.m. (Note: Changed from 11:00 a.m. kickoff due to inclement weather.)	TCU		Jack Trice Stadium; Ames, IA	ESPN2	W 49–24	59,553
October 12	3:00 p.m.	at West Virginia		Milan Puskar Stadium; Morgantown, WV	ESPN	W 38–14	51,836
October 19	11:00 a.m.	at Texas Tech		Jones AT&T Stadium; Lubbock, TX	FS1	W 34–24	52,315
October 26	2:30 p.m.	Oklahoma State^{†}	No. 23	Jack Trice Stadium; Ames, IA	FS1	L 27–34	61,500
November 9	7:00 p.m.	at No. 9 Oklahoma		Gaylord Family Oklahoma Memorial Stadium; Norman, OK	FOX	L 41–42	83,541
November 16	2:30 p.m.	No. 19 Texas		Jack Trice Stadium; Ames, IA	FS1	W 23–21	58,946
November 23	11:00 a.m.	Kansas	No. 22	Jack Trice Stadium; Ames, IA	FSN	W 41–31	58,210
November 30	6:00 p.m.	at Kansas State	No. 23	Bill Snyder Family Football Stadium; Manhattan, KS (rivalry)	FS1	L 17–27	48,990
December 28	11:00 a.m.	vs. No. 15 Notre Dame*		Camping World Stadium; Orlando, FL (Camping World Bowl)	ABC	L 9–33	46,948
*Non-conference game; ^{†}Homecoming; Rankings from AP Poll and CFP Rankings after November 5 released prior to game; All times are in Central time

== Rankings ==
Ranking movements Legend: ██ Increase in ranking ██ Decrease in ranking — = Not ranked RV = Received votes т = Tied with team above or below
	Week																
Poll	Pre	1	2	3	4	5	6	7	8	9	10	11	12	13	14	15	Final
AP	21	25-T	RV	RV	RV	—	RV	RV	23	RV	RV	RV	RV	RV	RV	RV	—
Coaches	24	RV	RV	RV	RV	—	—	RV	RV	RV	—	—	—	RV	RV	RV	—
CFP	Not released										—	—	22	23	—	—	Not released

== Preseason ==
=== Coaching changes ===
In January 2019, head coach Matt Campbell announced that Tom Manning would return as offensive coordinator. He had served in that role for the Cyclones in Campbell's first two years in 2016 and 2017, but worked as the tight ends coach for the Indianapolis Colts during the 2018 season. Campbell also announced the addition of former West Virginia defensive backs coach Matt Caponi as a defensive assistant.

=== Big 12 media poll ===
The 2019 Big 12 media days were held July 15–16, 2019 in Frisco, Texas. In the Big 12 preseason media poll, Iowa State was predicted to finish in third in the standings.

== Game summaries ==
=== Northern Iowa ===
	1	2	3	4	OT	2OT	3OT	Total
No. 18 (FCS) Panthers	0	0	13	0	3	7	3	26
No. 21 Cyclones	3	0	7	3	3	7	6	29

Referee Scott Campbell

=== Iowa ===
	1	2	3	4	Total
No. 19 Hawkeyes	3	3	3	9	18
Cyclones	7	0	7	3	17

=== Louisiana–Monroe ===
	1	2	3	4	Total
Warhawks	0	13	7	0	20
Cyclones	14	13	21	24	72

=== At Baylor ===
	1	2	3	4	Total
Cyclones	0	0	0	21	21
Bears	0	7	13	3	23

=== TCU ===
	1	2	3	4	Total
Horned Frogs	0	3	7	14	24
Cyclones	7	14	14	14	49

=== At West Virginia ===
	1	2	3	4	Total
Cyclones	0	14	7	17	38
Mountaineers	7	7	0	0	14

=== At Texas Tech ===
	1	2	3	4	Total
Cyclones	7	13	7	7	34
Red Raiders	0	7	10	7	24

=== Oklahoma State ===
	1	2	3	4	Total
Cowboys	7	14	3	10	34
No. 23 Cyclones	0	13	7	7	27

=== At Oklahoma ===
	1	2	3	4	Total
Cyclones	7	7	7	20	41
No. 9 Sooners	14	21	7	0	42

Both Iowa State and Oklahoma lost their previous games. Oklahoma could still be in the playoff chase by winning the remainder of their games and winning the Big 12 conference championship game. Predictions call that the Oklahoma Defense will need to slow the Cyclone offense to win the game. Coming into the game, it is listed as one of the most "compelling matchups" for the week by MSN Sports.

=== Texas ===
	1	2	3	4	Total
No. 19 Longhorns	0	7	0	14	21
Cyclones	7	3	10	3	23

=== Kansas ===
	1	2	3	4	Total
Jayhawks	6	3	15	7	31
No. 22 Cyclones	7	7	7	20	41

=== At Kansas State ===
	1	2	3	4	Total
No. 23 Cyclones	0	14	3	0	17
Wildcats	7	7	3	10	27

Game conditions were cold and windy for the 2019 edition of "Farmageddon". Iowa State entered the game as the least-penalized team in the Big 12 Conference, but were charged with 8 penalties to Kansas State's 2 when two programs met in Manhattan. The Cyclones also struggled on third down, only converting 1 attempt at 13.

Kansas State's Joshua Youngblood returned a kick for a touchdown on the first play of the game. That placed him at the top of the NCAA for three touchdown returns in the season this year.

During the third quarter, each team managed a field goal but very little more happened offensively. In the fourth quarter, Kansas State managed to pull ahead 24-17 with an eight-play drive rushing drive ending in a touchdown with 10:24 left in the game. After that, Iowa State punter Joe Rivera kicked just 17 yards on fourth down, which Kansas State was able to turn into a field goal and put the score out of reach for the Cyclones. The final score was Kansas State 27, Iowa State 17.

After the game and 7-5 regular season record, CBS Sports bowl expert Jerry Palm projected that Iowa State will play Kentucky in the 2019 Liberty Bowl.

=== Vs. Notre Dame—Camping World Bowl ===
	1	2	3	4	Total
No. 15 Fighting Irish	10	10	10	3	33
Cyclones	0	6	3	0	9

== Personnel ==
=== Coaching staff ===
Name	Position	Alma mater	Seasons at ISU
Matt Campbell	Head coach	Mount Union, 2002	4th
Jon Heacock	Defensive coordinator, Safeties	Muskingum, 1983	4th
Tom Manning	Offensive coordinator	Mount Union	3rd
Nathan Scheelhaase	Wide Receivers	Illinois, 2013	2nd
Alex Golesh	Tight Ends, Recruiting Coordinator	Ohio State, 2006	4th
Joel Gordon	Quarterbacks	Shepherd, 2003	4th
D. K. McDonald	Cornerbacks	Edinboro, 2001	4th
Eli Rasheed	Defensive Line	Indiana, 1996	4th
Tyson Veidt	Assistant Head Coach, Linebackers	Muskingum, 1996	4th
Rudy Wade	Strength and Conditioning	Ball State, 2001	4th

== TV ratings ==
Opponent	Outlet	Viewers	Rating
Northern Iowa	FS1	493K	0.31
Iowa	FS1	1.17M	0.6
Louisiana Monroe	FS1	159K	†
@ Baylor	ESPN	1.25M	0.8
TCU	ESPN2	403K	0.27
@ West Virginia	ESPN	1.57M	1.0
@ Texas Tech	FS1	343K	0.23
Oklahoma State	FS1	529K	0.32
@ Oklahoma	FOX	3.17M	1.9
Texas	FS1	1.07M	0.6
Kansas	FSN	†	†
@ Kansas State	FS1	642K	0.34
vs. Notre Dame	ABC	4.17M	2.65

All totals via Sports Media Watch. Streaming numbers not included. † - Data not available.
