= Claypool (surname) =

Claypool is a surname. Notable people with the surname include:

- Chase Claypool (born 1998), Canadian-born American football player
- Forrest Claypool, American politician
- Horatio C. Claypool, U.S. Congressman
- Harold K. Claypool, U.S. Congressman
- Les Claypool, American bassist, singer
- Philip Claypool, American country music artist
- Ralph Claypool, American football player
- William Claypool, American racehorse trainer
