= Quinn Carroll =

American football player

Profile
- Position: Offensive tackle

Personal information
- Listed height: 6 ft 7 in (2.01 m)
- Listed weight: 315 lb (143 kg)

Career information
- High school: Edina (Edina, Minnesota)
- College: Notre Dame (2019–2021); Minnesota (2022–2024)
- NFL draft: 2025: undrafted

Career history
- Hamilton Tiger-Cats (2026)*
- * Offseason or practice squad member only
- Stats at ESPN

Quinn William Carroll is an American professional football offensive tackle. He played college football for the Notre Dame Fighting Irish and Minnesota Golden Gophers.

== Early life ==
Carroll attended Edina High School in Edina, Minnesota. He was rated as the 12th-best offensive tackle and 87th overall recruit in the class of 2019 and committed to play college football for the Notre Dame Fighting Irish over offers from schools such as Minnesota, Wisconsin, Penn State, Virginia Tech and Wisconsin.

== College career ==
=== Notre Dame ===
Carroll missed his freshman season in 2019 due to tearing his ACL. In 2020, he appeared in three games for the Fighting Irish. In 2021, Carroll played in 12 games for the Fighting Irish with no starts. After the season, he entered his name into the NCAA transfer portal.

=== Minnesota ===
Carroll transferred to play for the Minnesota Golden Gophers. In three seasons with the team, he started all 39 games in various positions on the offensive line. After the 2024 season, Carroll declared for the 2025 NFL draft, where he also accepted an invite to the 2025 Hula Bowl.

== Professional career ==
Pre-draft measurables
Height	Weight	Arm length	Hand span
6 ft 6 1/2 in (1.99 m)	318 lb (144 kg)	32 1/4 in (0.82 m)	9 3/4 in (0.25 m)
All values from Pro Day

Carroll signed with the Hamilton Tiger-Cats of the Canadian Football League on February 4, 2026. He was released on May 13.

== Personal life ==
His father, Jay, played as a tight end for Minnesota from 1981 to 1983 while his brother, Collin, played as a long snapper for the Virginia Tech Hokies from 2007 to 2011.
