= 2019 NCAA Division I FBS football rankings =

- Season: 2019
- Bowl season: 2019–20 bowl games
- Preseason No. 1: Clemson
- End of season champions: LSU
- Conference with most teams in final AP poll: Big 10 (6)

Human polls and a committee's selections comprise the 2019 National Collegiate Athletic Association (NCAA) Division I Football Bowl Subdivision (FBS) football rankings, in addition to various publications' preseason polls. Unlike most sports, college football's governing body, the NCAA, does not bestow a national championship, instead that title is bestowed by one or more different polling agencies. There are two main weekly polls that begin in the preseason—the AP Poll and the Coaches Poll. One additional poll, the College Football Playoff (CFP) ranking, is released midway through the season after the ninth week. The CFP rankings determine who makes the four-team playoff which determines the College Football Playoff National Champion.

== Legend ==
	Increase in ranking
	Decrease in ranking
	Not ranked previous week
	Selected for College Football Playoff
(#–#)	Win–loss record
(Italics)	Number of first place votes
т	Tied with team above or below also with this symbol

== AP Poll ==
	Preseason Aug 19	Week 1 Sep 3	Week 2 Sep 8	Week 3 Sep 15	Week 4 Sep 22	Week 5 Sep 29	Week 6 Oct 6	Week 7 Oct 13	Week 8 Oct 20	Week 9 Oct 27	Week 10 Nov 3	Week 11 Nov 10	Week 12 Nov 17	Week 13 Nov 24	Week 14 Dec 1	Week 15 Dec 8	Week 16 (Final) Jan 14	
1.	Clemson (52)	Clemson (1–0) (54)	Clemson (2–0) (56)	Clemson (3–0) (57)	Clemson (4–0) (55)	Alabama (5–0) (29)	Alabama (5–0) (32)	Alabama (6–0) (30)	Alabama (7–0) (24)	LSU (8–0) (17)	LSU (8–0) (17)	LSU (9–0) (54)	LSU (10–0) (54)	LSU (11–0) (50)	LSU (12–0) (40)	LSU (13–0) (47)	LSU (15–0) (62)	1.
2.	Alabama (10)	Alabama (1–0) (8)	Alabama (2–0) (6)	Alabama (3–0) (5)	Alabama (4–0) (6)	Clemson (5–0) (18)	Clemson (5–0) (15)	LSU (6–0) (12)	LSU (7–0) (16)	Alabama (8–0) (21)	Alabama (8–0) (21)	Ohio State (9–0) (5)	Ohio State (10–0) (5)	Ohio State (11–0) (9)	Ohio State (12–0) (19)	Ohio State (13–0) (12)	Clemson (14–1)	2.
3.	Georgia	Georgia (1–0)	Georgia (2–0)	Georgia (3–0)	Georgia (4–0) (1)	Georgia (4–0) (4)	Georgia (5–0) (3) т	Clemson (6–0) (11)	Ohio State (7–0) (13)	Ohio State (8–0) (17)	Ohio State (8–0) (17)	Clemson (10–0) (3)	Clemson (11–0) (3)	Clemson (11–0) (3)	Clemson (12–0) (3)	Clemson (13–0) (3)	Ohio State (13–1)	3.
4.	Oklahoma	Oklahoma (1–0)	LSU (2–0)	LSU (3–0)	LSU (4–0)	Ohio State (5–0) (7)	Ohio State (6–0) (10) т	Ohio State (6–0) (9)	Clemson (7–0) (9)	Clemson (8–0) (7)	Clemson (9–0) (7)	Alabama (8–1)	Georgia (9–1)	Georgia (10–1)	Georgia (11–1)	Oklahoma (12–1)	Georgia (12–2)	4.
5.	Ohio State	Ohio State (1–0)	Oklahoma (2–0)	Oklahoma (3–0)	Ohio State (4–0)	LSU (4–0)	LSU (5–0) (2)	Oklahoma (6–0)	Oklahoma (7–0)	Penn State (8–0)	Penn State (8–0)	Georgia (8–1)	Alabama (9–1)	Alabama (10–1)	Utah (11–1)	Georgia (11–2)	Oregon (12–2)	5.
6.	LSU	LSU (1–0)	Ohio State (2–0)	Ohio State (3–0)	Oklahoma (3–0)	Oklahoma (4–0)	Oklahoma (5–0)	Wisconsin (6–0)	Penn State (7–0)	Florida (7–1)	Georgia (7–1)	Oregon (8–1)	Oregon (9–1)	Utah (10–1)	Oklahoma (11–1)	Florida (10–2)	Florida (11–2)	6.
7.	Michigan	Michigan (1–0)	Notre Dame (1–0)	Notre Dame (2–0)	Auburn (4–0)	Auburn (5–0) (3)	Florida (6–0)	Penn State (6–0)	Florida (7–1)	Oregon (7–1)	Oregon (8–1)	Minnesota (9–0)	Utah (9–1)	Oklahoma (10–1)	Florida (10–2)	Oregon (11–2)	Oklahoma (12–2)	7.
8.	Florida	Notre Dame (1–0)	Auburn (2–0)	Auburn (3–0)	Wisconsin (3–0)	Wisconsin (4–0)	Wisconsin (5–0)	Notre Dame (5–1)	Notre Dame (5–1)	Georgia (6–1)	Utah (8–1)	Utah (8–1)	Oklahoma (9–1)	Florida (9–2)	Baylor (11–1)	Baylor (11–2)	Alabama (11–2)	8.
9.	Notre Dame	Texas (1–0)	Florida (2–0)	Florida (3–0)	Florida (4–0)	Notre Dame (3–1)	Notre Dame (4–1)	Florida (6–1)	Auburn (6–1)	Utah (7–1)	Oklahoma (7–1)	Penn State (8–1)	Penn State (9–1)	Minnesota (10–1)	Alabama (10–2)	Alabama (10–2) т	Penn State (11–2)	9.
10.	Texas	Auburn (1–0)	Michigan (2–0)	Utah (3–0)	Notre Dame (2–1)	Florida (5–0)	Penn State (5–0)	Georgia (5–1)	Georgia (6–1)	Oklahoma (7–1)	Florida (7–2)	Oklahoma (8–1)	Florida (9–2)	Michigan (9–2)	Wisconsin (10–2)	Auburn (9–3) т	Minnesota (11–2)	10.
11.	Oregon	Florida (1–0)	Utah (2–0)	Michigan (2–0)	Texas (3–1)	Texas (3–1)	Texas (4–1)	Auburn (5–1)	Oregon (6–1)	Auburn (6–2)	Baylor (8–0)	Florida (8–2)	Minnesota (9–1)	Baylor (10–1)	Auburn (9–3)	Wisconsin (10–3)	Wisconsin (10–4)	11.
12.	Texas A&M	Texas A&M (1–0)	Texas (1–1)	Texas (2–1)	Penn State (3–0)	Penn State (4–0)	Auburn (5–1)	Oregon (5–1)	Utah (6–1)	Baylor (7–0)	Auburn (7–2)	Baylor (9–0)	Michigan (8–2)	Penn State (9–2)	Penn State (10–2)	Utah (11–2)	Notre Dame (11–2)	12.
13.	Washington	Utah (1–0)	Penn State (2–0)	Penn State (3–0) т	Oregon (3–1)	Oregon (3–1)	Oregon (4–1)	Utah (5–1)	Wisconsin (6–1)	Minnesota (8–0)	Minnesota (8–0)	Auburn (7–2)	Baylor (9–1)	Wisconsin (9–2)	Oregon (10–2)	Penn State (10–2)	Baylor (11–3)	13.
14.	Utah	Washington (1–0)	Wisconsin (2–0)	Wisconsin (2–0) т	Iowa (3–0)	Iowa (4–0)	Boise State (5–0)	Boise State (6–0)	Baylor (7–0)	Michigan (6–2)	Michigan (7–2)	Michigan (7–2)	Wisconsin (8–2)	Oregon (9–2)	Notre Dame (10–2)	Notre Dame (10–2)	Auburn (9–4)	14.
15.	Penn State	Penn State (1–0)	Oregon (1–1)	UCF (3–0)	California (4–0)	Washington (4–1)	Utah (4–1)	Texas (4–2)	Texas (5–2)	SMU (8–0)	Notre Dame (6–2)	Wisconsin (7–2)	Notre Dame (8–2)	Notre Dame (9–2)	Minnesota (10–2)	Memphis (12–1)	Iowa (10–3)	15.
16.	Auburn	Oregon (0–1)	Texas A&M (1–1)	Oregon (2–1)	Boise State (4–0)	Boise State (4–0)	Michigan (4–1)	Michigan (5–1)	SMU (7–0)	Notre Dame (5–2)	Wisconsin (6–2)	Notre Dame (7–2)	Auburn (7–3)	Auburn (8–3)	Memphis (11–1)	Minnesota (10–2)	Utah (11–3)	16.
17.	UCF	Wisconsin (1–0)	UCF (2–0)	Texas A&M (2–1)	Washington (3–1)	Utah (4–1)	Iowa (4–1)	Arizona State (5–1)	Minnesota (7–0)	Cincinnati (6–1)	Cincinnati (7–1)	Cincinnati (8–1)	Cincinnati (9–1)	Memphis (10–1)	Michigan (9–3)	Michigan (9–3)	Memphis (12–2)	17.
18.	Michigan State	UCF (1–0)	Michigan State (2–0)	Iowa (3–0)	Virginia (4–0)	UCF (4–1)	Arizona State (4–1)	Baylor (6–0)	Cincinnati (6–1)	Wisconsin (6–2)	Iowa (6–2)	Memphis (8–1)	Memphis (9–1)	Cincinnati (10–1)	Iowa (9–3)	Boise State (12–1)	Michigan (9–4)	18.
19.	Wisconsin	Michigan State (1–0)	Iowa (2–0)	Washington State (3–0)	Utah (3–1)	Michigan (3–1)	Wake Forest (5–0)	SMU (6–0)	Michigan (5–2)	Iowa (6–2)	Memphis (8–1)	Boise State (8–1)	Iowa (7–3)	Iowa (8–3)	Boise State (11–1)	Iowa (9–3)	Appalachian State (13–1)	19.
20.	Iowa	Iowa (1–0)	Washington State (2–0)	Boise State (3–0)	Michigan (2–1)	Arizona State (4–1)	Virginia (4–1)	Minnesota (6–0)	Iowa (5–2)	Appalachian State (7–0)	Kansas State (6–2)	SMU (9–1)	Boise State (9–1)	Boise State (10–1)	Appalachian State (11–1)	Appalachian State (12–1)	Navy (11–2)	20.
21.	Iowa State	Syracuse (1–0)	Maryland (2–0)	Virginia (3–0)	USC (3–1)	Oklahoma State (4–1)	SMU (6–0)	Cincinnati (5–1)	Appalachian State (6–0)	Boise State (6–1)	Boise State (7–1)	Navy (7–1)	SMU (9–1)	Oklahoma State (8–3)	Cincinnati (10–2)	Navy (9–2)	Cincinnati (11–3)	21.
22.	Syracuse	Washington State (1–0)	Boise State (2–0)	Washington (2–1)	UCF (3–1)	Wake Forest (5–0)	Baylor (5–0)	Missouri (5–1)	Boise State (6–1)	Kansas State (5–2)	Wake Forest (7–1)	Texas (6–3)	Oklahoma State (7–3)	Appalachian State (10–1)	Virginia (9–3)	USC (8–4)	Air Force (11–2)	22.
23.	Washington State	Stanford (1–0)	Washington (1–1)	California (3–0)	Texas A&M (2–2)	Virginia (4–1)	Memphis (5–0)	Iowa (4–2)	Iowa State (5–2)	Wake Forest (6–1)	SMU (8–1)	Iowa (6–3)	Appalachian State (9–1)	Virginia Tech (8–3)	Navy (9–2)	Cincinnati (10–3)	Boise State (12–2)	23.
24.	Nebraska	Boise State (1–0)	USC (2–0)	Arizona State (3–0)	Kansas State (3–0)	SMU (5–0)	Texas A&M (3–2)	Appalachian State (5–0)	Arizona State (5–2)	Memphis (7–1)	San Diego State (7–1)	Indiana (7–2)	Texas A&M (7–3)	Navy (8–2)	USC (8–4)	Air Force (10–2)	UCF (10–3)	24.
25.	Stanford	Iowa State (1–0) т Nebraska (1–0) т	Virginia (2–0)	TCU (2–0)	Michigan State (3–1)	Michigan State (4–1) т; Texas A&M (3–2) т	Cincinnati (4–1)	Washington (5–2)	Wake Forest (6–1)	San Diego State (7–1)	Navy (7–1)	Oklahoma State (6–3)	Virginia Tech (7–3)	USC (8–4)	Air Force (10–2)	Oklahoma State (8–4)	Texas (8–5)	25.
	Preseason Aug 19	Week 1 Sep 3	Week 2 Sep 8	Week 3 Sep 15	Week 4 Sep 22	Week 5 Sep 29	Week 6 Oct 6	Week 7 Oct 13	Week 8 Oct 20	Week 9 Oct 27	Week 10 Nov 3	Week 11 Nov 10	Week 12 Nov 17	Week 13 Nov 24	Week 14 Dec 1	Week 15 Dec 8	Week 16 (Final) Jan 14	
		None	Dropped: Syracuse; Stanford; Iowa State; Nebraska	Dropped: Michigan State; Maryland; USC	Dropped: Washington State; Arizona State; TCU	Dropped: California; USC; Kansas State	Dropped: Washington; UCF; Oklahoma State; Michigan State	Dropped: Wake Forest; Virginia; Memphis; Texas A&M	Dropped: Missouri; Washington	Dropped: Texas; Iowa State; Arizona State	Dropped: Appalachian State	Dropped: Kansas State; Wake Forest; San Diego State	Dropped: Navy; Texas; Indiana	Dropped: SMU; Texas A&M	Dropped: Oklahoma State; Virginia Tech	Dropped: Virginia	Dropped: USC; Oklahoma State	

== Coaches Poll ==
	Preseason Aug 1	Week 1 Sep 3	Week 2 Sep 8	Week 3 Sep 15	Week 4 Sep 22	Week 5 Sep 29	Week 6 Oct 6	Week 7 Oct 13	Week 8 Oct 20	Week 9 Oct 27	Week 10 Nov 3	Week 11 Nov 10	Week 12 Nov 17	Week 13 Nov 24	Week 14 Dec 1	Week 15 Dec 8	Week 16 (Final) Jan 14	
1.	Clemson (59)	Clemson (1–0) (58)	Clemson (2–0) (60)	Clemson (3–0) (62)	Clemson (4–0) (62)	Alabama (5–0) (29)	Alabama (5–0) (42)	Alabama (6–0) (44)	Alabama (7–0) (44)	Alabama (8–0) (40)	Alabama (8–0) (37)	LSU (9–0) (55)	LSU (10–0) (55)	LSU (11–0) (52)	LSU (12–0) (43)	LSU (13–0) (46)	LSU (15–0) (65)	1.
2.	Alabama (6)	Alabama (1–0) (6)	Alabama (2–0) (3)	Alabama (3–0) (3)	Alabama (4–0) (2)	Clemson (5–0) (30)	Clemson (5–0) (20)	Clemson (6–0) (14)	Clemson (7–0) (10)	LSU (8–0) (7)	LSU (8–0) (11)	Ohio State (9–0) (5)	Ohio State (10–0) (6)	Ohio State (11–0) (7)	Ohio State (12–0) (17)	Ohio State (13–0) (14)	Clemson (14–1)	2.
3.	Georgia	Georgia (1–0)	Georgia (2–0)	Georgia (3–0)	Georgia (4–0) (1)	Georgia (4–0) (1)	Georgia (5–0)	LSU (6–0) (3)	LSU (7–0) (3)	Clemson (8–0) (10)	Clemson (9–0) (9)	Clemson (10–0) (4)	Clemson (11–0) (4)	Clemson (11–0) (4)	Clemson (12–0) (4)	Clemson (13–0) (5)	Ohio State (13–1)	3.
4.	Oklahoma	Oklahoma (1–0)	Oklahoma (2–0)	Oklahoma (3–0)	Oklahoma (3–0)	Oklahoma (4–0)	Ohio State (5–0) (3)	Ohio State (6–0) (4)	Ohio State (7–0) (8)	Ohio State (8–0) (8)	Ohio State (8–0) (8)	Alabama (8–1)	Georgia (9–1)	Georgia (10–1)	Georgia (11–1)	Oklahoma (12–1)	Georgia (12–2)	4.
5.	Ohio State	Ohio State (1–0)	LSU (2–0)	LSU (3–0)	LSU (4–0)	Ohio State (5–0) (4)	Oklahoma (5–0)	Oklahoma (6–0)	Oklahoma (7–0)	Penn State (8–0)	Penn State (8–0)	Georgia (8–1)	Alabama (9–1)	Alabama (10–1)	Utah (11–1)	Georgia (11–2)	Oregon (12–2)	5.
6.	LSU	LSU (1–0)	Ohio State (2–0)	Ohio State (3–0)	Ohio State (4–0)	LSU (4–0)	LSU (5–0)	Wisconsin (6–0)	Penn State (7–0)	Florida (7–1)	Georgia (7–1)	Oregon (8–1)	Oregon (9–1)	Utah (10–1)	Oklahoma (11–1)	Oregon (11–2)	Oklahoma (12–2)	6.
7.	Michigan	Michigan (1–0)	Notre Dame (2–0)	Notre Dame (2–0)	Auburn (4–0)	Auburn (4–0)	Florida (6–0)	Penn State (6–0)	Notre Dame (5–1)	Georgia (6–1)	Oregon (8–1)	Minnesota (9–0)	Oklahoma (9–1)	Oklahoma (10–1)	Florida (10–2)	Florida (10–2)	Florida (11–2)	7.
8.	Florida	Notre Dame (1–0)	Florida (2–0)	Florida (3–0)	Florida (4–0)	Florida (5–0)	Wisconsin (5–0)	Notre Dame (5–1)	Florida (7–1)	Oregon (7–1)	Oklahoma (7–1)	Oklahoma (8–1)	Utah (9–1)	Florida (9–2)	Baylor (11–1)	Baylor (11–2)	Alabama (11–2)	8.
9.	Notre Dame	Texas (1–0)	Auburn (2–0)	Auburn (3–0)	Wisconsin (3–0)	Wisconsin (4–0)	Penn State (5–0)	Florida (6–1)	Georgia (6–1)	Oklahoma (7–1)	Utah (8–1)	Utah (8–1)	Penn State (9–1)	Minnesota (10–1)	Alabama (10–2)	Alabama (10–2)	Penn State (11–2)	9.
10.	Texas	Florida (1–0)	Michigan (2–0)	Michigan (2–0)	Notre Dame (2–1)	Notre Dame (3–1)	Notre Dame (4–1)	Georgia (5–1)	Auburn (6–1)	Utah (7–1)	Baylor (8–0)	Baylor (9–0)	Florida (9–2)	Baylor (10–1)	Wisconsin (10–2)	Utah (11–2)	Minnesota (11–2)	10.
11.	Texas A&M	Texas A&M (1–0)	Penn State (2–0)	Utah (3–0)	Penn State (3–0)	Penn State (4–0)	Texas (4–1)	Auburn (5–1)	Oregon (6–1)	Baylor (7–0)	Florida (7–2)	Penn State (8–1)	Minnesota (9–1)	Michigan (9–2)	Penn State (10–2)	Wisconsin (10–3)	Notre Dame (11–2)	11.
12.	Washington	Washington (1–0)	Utah (2–0)	Penn State (3–0)	Texas (3–1)	Texas (3–1)	Auburn (4–1)	Oregon (5–1)	Utah (6–1)	Auburn (6–2)	Auburn (7–2)	Florida (8–2)	Michigan (8–2)	Penn State (9–2)	Auburn (9–3)	Penn State (10–2)	Baylor (11–3)	12.
13.	Oregon	Auburn (1–0)	Texas (1–1)	Texas (2–1)	Oregon (3–1)	Oregon (3–1)	Oregon (4–1)	Boise State (6–0)	Wisconsin (6–1)	Minnesota (8–0)	Minnesota (8–0)	Auburn (7–2)	Baylor (9–1)	Oregon (9–2)	Oregon (10–2)	Auburn (9–3)	Wisconsin (10–4)	13.
14.	Penn State	Penn State (1–0)	Wisconsin (2–0)	Wisconsin (2–0)	Iowa (3–0)	Iowa (4–0)	Boise State (5–0)	Utah (5–1)	Baylor (7–0)	SMU (8–0)	Michigan (7–2)	Michigan (7–2)	Wisconsin (8–2)	Wisconsin (9–2)	Notre Dame (10–2)	Notre Dame (10–2)	Auburn (9–4)	14.
15.	Utah	Utah (1–0)	Texas A&M (1–1)	Texas A&M (2–1)	Boise State (4–0)	Boise State (4–0)	Utah (4–1)	Texas (4–2)	Texas (5–2)	Michigan (6–2)	Notre Dame (6–2)	Wisconsin (7–2)	Notre Dame (8–2)	Notre Dame (9–2)	Minnesota (10–2)	Memphis (12–1)	Iowa (10–3)	15.
16.	Auburn	Wisconsin (1–0)	UCF (2–0)	UCF (3–0)	California (4–0)	Washington (4–1)	Michigan (4–1)	Michigan (5–1)	Minnesota (7–0)	Notre Dame (5–2)	Wisconsin (6–2)	Notre Dame (7–2)	Auburn (7–3)	Auburn (8–3)	Memphis (11–1)	Minnesota (10–2)	Utah (11–3)	16.
17.	UCF т	UCF (1–0)	Oregon (1–1)	Oregon (2–1)	Washington (3–1)	Utah (4–1)	Wake Forest (5–0)	Arizona State (5–1)	SMU (7–0)	Wisconsin (6–2)	Cincinnati (7–1)	Cincinnati (8–1)	Cincinnati (9–1)	Cincinnati (10–1)	Boise State (11–1)	Michigan (9–3)	Memphis (12–2)	17.
18.	Wisconsin т	Oregon (0–1)	Iowa (2–0)	Iowa (3–0)	Virginia (4–0)	Michigan (3–1)	Iowa (4–1)	Baylor (6–0)	Cincinnati (6–1)	Cincinnati (6–1)	Iowa (6–2)	Memphis (8–1)	Memphis (9–1)	Memphis (10–1)	Michigan (9–3)	Boise State (12–1)	Appalachian State (13–1)	18.
19.	Iowa	Iowa (1–0)	Michigan State (2–0)	Washington State (3–0)	Utah (3–1)	UCF (4–1)	Virginia (4–1)	SMU (6–0)	Iowa (5–2)	Iowa (6–2)	Memphis (8–1)	Boise State (8–1)	Boise State (9–1)	Boise State (10–1)	Iowa (9–3)	Iowa (9–3)	Michigan (9–4)	19.
20.	Michigan State	Michigan State (1–0)	Washington State (2–0)	Boise State (3–0)	Michigan (2–1)	Wake Forest (5–0)	Memphis (5–0)	Minnesota (6–0)	Michigan (5–2)	Appalachian State (7–0)	Wake Forest (7–1)	SMU (9–1)	Iowa (7–3)	Iowa (8–3)	Appalachian State (11–1)	Appalachian State (12–1)	Navy (11–2)	20.
21.	Washington State	Washington State (1–0)	Washington (1–1)	Washington (2–1)	Texas A&M (2–2)	Texas A&M (3–2)	Texas A&M (3–2)	Cincinnati (5–1)	Boise State (6–1)	Boise State (6–1)	Boise State (7–1)	Navy (7–1)	SMU (9–1)	Oklahoma State (8–3)	Cincinnati (10–2)	Navy (9–2)	Cincinnati (11–3)	21.
22.	Syracuse	Syracuse (1–0)	Boise State (2–0)	Virginia (3–0)	Kansas State (3–0)	Virginia (4–1)	SMU (6–0)	Iowa (4–2)	Appalachian State (6–0)	Wake Forest (6–1)	Kansas State (6–2)	Iowa (6–3)	Appalachian State (9–1)	Appalachian State (10–1)	Virginia (9–3)	Cincinnati (10–3)	Boise State (12–2)	22.
23.	Stanford	Stanford (1–0)	Mississippi State (2–0)	California (3–0)	UCF (3–1)	Michigan State (4–1) т	Baylor (5–0)	Washington (5–2)	Wake Forest (6–1)	Memphis (7–1)	SMU (8–1)	Texas (6–3)	Oklahoma State (7–3)	Virginia Tech (8–3)	Navy (9–2)	USC (8–4)	Air Force (11–2)	23.
24.	Iowa State	Boise State (1–0)	USC (2–0)	Arizona State (3–0)	Wake Forest (4–0)	Memphis (4–0) т	Arizona State (4–1)	Appalachian State (5–0)	Arizona State (5–2)	Texas (5–3)	San Diego State (7–1)	Appalachian State (8–1)	Texas A&M (7–3)	Navy (8–2)	USC (8–4)	Air Force (10–2)	UCF (10–3)	24.
25.	Northwestern	Nebraska (1–0)	Maryland (2–0)	Kansas State (3–0)	USC (3–1)	Oklahoma State (4–1)	Minnesota (5–0)	Temple (5–1)	Memphis (6–1)	Kansas State (5–2)	Navy (7–1)	Indiana (7–2)	San Diego State (8–2)	USC (8–4)	Air Force (10–2)	Virginia (9–4)	Virginia (9–5)	25.
	Preseason Aug 1	Week 1 Sep 3	Week 2 Sep 8	Week 3 Sep 15	Week 4 Sep 22	Week 5 Sep 29	Week 6 Oct 6	Week 7 Oct 13	Week 8 Oct 20	Week 9 Oct 27	Week 10 Nov 3	Week 11 Nov 10	Week 12 Nov 17	Week 13 Nov 24	Week 14 Dec 1	Week 15 Dec 8	Week 16 (Final) Jan 14	
		Dropped: Iowa State; Northwestern	Dropped: Syracuse; Stanford; Nebraska	Dropped: Michigan State; Mississippi State; USC; Maryland	Dropped: Washington State; Arizona State	Dropped: California; Kansas State; USC	Dropped: Washington; UCF; Michigan State; Oklahoma State	Dropped: Wake Forest; Virginia; Memphis; Texas A&M	Dropped: Washington; Temple	Dropped: Arizona State	Dropped: Appalachian State; Texas	Dropped: Wake Forest; Kansas State; San Diego State	Dropped: Navy; Texas; Indiana	Dropped: SMU; Texas A&M; San Diego State	Dropped: Oklahoma State; Virginia Tech	None	Dropped: USC	

== CFP rankings ==
	Week 10 Nov 5	Week 11 Nov 12	Week 12 Nov 19	Week 13 Nov 26	Week 14 Dec 3	Week 15 (Final) Dec 8	
1.	Ohio State (8–0)	LSU (9–0)	LSU (10–0)	Ohio State (11–0)	Ohio State (12–0)	LSU (13–0)	1.
2.	LSU (8–0)	Ohio State (9–0)	Ohio State (10–0)	LSU (11–0)	LSU (12–0)	Ohio State (13–0)	2.
3.	Alabama (8–0)	Clemson (10–0)	Clemson (10–0)	Clemson (11–0)	Clemson (12–0)	Clemson (13–0)	3.
4.	Penn State (8–0)	Georgia (8–1)	Georgia (9–1)	Georgia (10–1)	Georgia (11–1)	Oklahoma (12–1)	4.
5.	Clemson (9–0)	Alabama (8–1)	Alabama (9–1)	Alabama (10–1)	Utah (11–1)	Georgia (11–2)	5.
6.	Georgia (7–1)	Oregon (8–1)	Oregon (9–1)	Utah (10–1)	Oklahoma (11–1)	Oregon (11–2)	6.
7.	Oregon (8–1)	Utah (8–1)	Utah (9–1)	Oklahoma (10–1)	Baylor (11–1)	Baylor (11–2)	7.
8.	Utah (8–1)	Minnesota (9–0)	Penn State (9–1)	Minnesota (10–1)	Wisconsin (10–2)	Wisconsin (10–3)	8.
9.	Oklahoma (7–1)	Penn State (8–1)	Oklahoma (9–1)	Baylor (10–1)	Florida (10–2)	Florida (10–2)	9.
10.	Florida (7–2)	Oklahoma (8–1)	Minnesota (9–1)	Penn State (9–2)	Penn State (10–2)	Penn State (10–2)	10.
11.	Auburn (7–2)	Florida (8–2)	Florida (9–2)	Florida (9–2)	Auburn (9–3)	Utah (11–2)	11.
12.	Baylor (8–0)	Auburn (7–2)	Wisconsin (8–2)	Wisconsin (9–2)	Alabama (10–2)	Auburn (9–3)	12.
13.	Wisconsin (6–2)	Baylor (9–0)	Michigan (8–2)	Michigan (9–2)	Oregon (10–2)	Alabama (10–2)	13.
14.	Michigan (7–2)	Wisconsin (7–2)	Baylor (9–1)	Oregon (9–2)	Michigan (9–3)	Michigan (9–3)	14.
15.	Notre Dame (6–2)	Michigan (7–2)	Auburn (7–3)	Auburn (8–3)	Notre Dame (10–2)	Notre Dame (10–2)	15.
16.	Kansas State (6–2)	Notre Dame (7–2)	Notre Dame (8–2)	Notre Dame (9–2)	Iowa (9–3)	Iowa (9–3)	16.
17.	Minnesota (8–0)	Cincinnati (8–1)	Iowa (7–3)	Iowa (8–3)	Memphis (11–1)	Memphis (12–1)	17.
18.	Iowa (6–2)	Memphis (8–1)	Memphis (9–1)	Memphis (10–1)	Minnesota (10–2)	Minnesota (10–2)	18.
19.	Wake Forest (7–1)	Texas (6–3)	Cincinnati (9–1)	Cincinnati (10–1)	Boise State (11–1)	Boise State (12–1)	19.
20.	Cincinnati (7–1)	Iowa (6–3)	Boise State (9–1)	Boise State (10–1)	Cincinnati (10–2)	Appalachian State (12–1)	20.
21.	Memphis (8–1)	Boise State (8–1)	Oklahoma State (7–3)	Oklahoma State (8–3)	Appalachian State (11–1)	Cincinnati (10–3)	21.
22.	Boise State (7–1)	Oklahoma State (6–3)	Iowa State (6–4)	USC (8–4)	USC (8–4)	USC (8–4)	22.
23.	Oklahoma State (6–3)	Navy (7–1)	USC (7–4)	Iowa State (7–4)	Virginia (9–3)	Navy (9–2)	23.
24.	Navy (7–1)	Kansas State (6–3)	Appalachian State (9–1)	Virginia Tech (8–3)	Navy (9–2)	Virginia (9–4)	24.
25.	SMU (8–1)	Appalachian State (8–1)	SMU (9–1)	Appalachian State (10–1)	Oklahoma State (8–4)	Oklahoma State (8–4)	25.
	Week 10 Nov 5	Week 11 Nov 12	Week 12 Nov 19	Week 13 Nov 26	Week 14 Dec 3	Week 15 (Final) Dec 8	
		Dropped: Wake Forest; SMU	Dropped: Texas; Navy; Kansas State	Dropped: SMU	Dropped: Iowa State; Virginia Tech	None	

== FWAA-NFF Super 16 Poll ==
The joint poll of the Football Writers Association of America and National Football Foundation is a human poll which the NCAA Football Bowl Subdivision Records book designates as being one of the "major selectors" of national championships. The NFF automatically awards its MacArthur Bowl National Championship Trophy to the winner of the College Football Playoff National Championship.

	Preseason Aug 19	Week 1 Sep 3	Week 2 Sep 8	Week 3 Sep 15	Week 4 Sep 22	Week 5 Sep 29	Week 6 Oct 6	Week 7 Oct 13	Week 8 Oct 20	Week 9 Oct 27	Week 10 Nov 3	Week 11 Nov 10	Week 12 Nov 17	Week 13 Nov 24	Week 14 Dec 1	Week 15 (Final) Dec 8	
1.	Clemson (33)	Clemson (1–0) (35)	Clemson (2–0) (38)	Clemson (3–0) (34)	Clemson (4–0) (33)	Alabama (5–0) (22)	Alabama (5–0) (27)	Alabama (6–0) (28)	Alabama (7–0) (24)	Alabama (8–0) (19)	LSU (8–0) (17)	LSU (9–0) (42)	LSU (10–0) (40)	LSU (11–0) (38)	LSU (12–0) (29)	LSU (13–0) (40)	1.
2.	Alabama (10)	Alabama (1–0) (7)	Alabama (2–0) (4)	Alabama (3–0) (8)	Alabama (4–0) (9)	Clemson (5–0) (12)	Ohio State (6–0) (8)	LSU (6–0) (7)	LSU (7–0) (11)	LSU (8–0) (13)	Alabama (8–0) (17)	Ohio State (9–0) (3)	Ohio State (10–0) (5)	Ohio State (11–0) (7)	Ohio State (12–0) (16)	Ohio State (13–0) (5)	2.
3.	Georgia (1)	Georgia (1–0) (1)	LSU (2–0) (3)	Georgia (3–0) (1)	Georgia (4–0) (1)	Ohio State (5–0) (5)	Clemson (5–0) (5)	Ohio State (6–0) (6)	Ohio State (7–0) (7)	Ohio State (8–0) (11)	Ohio State (8–0) (9)	Clemson (10–0) (1)	Clemson (11–0) (1)	Clemson (11–0) (1)	Clemson (12–0) (1)	Clemson (13–0) (1)	3.
4.	Oklahoma	Oklahoma (1–0) (1)	Georgia (2–0) (1)	LSU (3–0) (3)	LSU (4–0) (3)	Georgia (4–0) (1)	LSU (5–0) (4)	Clemson (6–0) (5)	Clemson (7–0) (3)	Clemson (8–0) (3)	Clemson (9–0) (3)	Alabama (8–1)	Georgia (9–1)	Georgia (10–1)	Georgia (11–1)	Oklahoma (12–1)	4.
5.	Ohio State	Ohio State (1–0)	Oklahoma (2–0)	Oklahoma (3–0)	Ohio State (4–0)	LSU (4–0) (4)	Georgia (5–0) (1)	Oklahoma (6–0)	Oklahoma (7–0) (1)	Penn State (8–0)	Penn State (8–0)	Georgia (8–1)	Alabama (9–1)	Alabama (10–1)	Utah (11–1)	Georgia (11–2)	5.
6.	LSU (2)	LSU (1–0) (2)	Ohio State (2–0)	Ohio State (3–0)	Oklahoma (3–0)	Oklahoma (4–0) (1)	Oklahoma (5–0) (1)	Wisconsin (6–0)	Penn State (7–0)	Florida (7–1)	Georgia (7–1)	Oregon (8–1)	Oregon (9–1)	Utah (10–1)	Oklahoma (11–1)	Oregon (11–2)	6.
7.	Michigan	Michigan (1–0)	Notre Dame (1–0)	Notre Dame (2–0)	Auburn (4–0)	Auburn (5–0) (1)	Wisconsin (5–0)	Penn State (6–0)	Florida (7–1)	Georgia (6–1)	Oregon (8–1)	Minnesota (9–0)	Oklahoma (9–1)	Oklahoma (10–1)	Baylor (11–1)	Baylor (11–2)	7.
8.	Notre Dame	Texas (1–0)	Auburn (2–0)	Auburn (3–0)	Wisconsin (3–0)	Wisconsin (4–0)	Florida (6–0)	Florida (6–1)	Notre Dame (5–1)	Oregon (7–1)	Oklahoma (7–1)	Oklahoma (8–1)	Utah (9–1)	Minnesota (10–1)	Alabama (10–2)	Florida (10–2)	8.
9.	Texas	Notre Dame (1–0)	Florida (2–0)	Texas (2–1)	Florida (4–0)	Florida (5–0)	Notre Dame (4–1)	Notre Dame (5–1)	Georgia (6–1)	Oklahoma (7–1)	Utah (8–1)	Utah (8–1)	Penn State (9–1)	Florida (9–2)	Florida (10–2)	Alabama (10–2)	9.
10.	Florida	Auburn (1–0)	Michigan (2–0)	Utah (3–0)	Texas (3–1)	Notre Dame (3–1)	Penn State (5–0)	Georgia (5–1)	Auburn (6–1)	Utah (7–1)	Florida (7–2)	Penn State (8–1)	Florida (9–2)	Baylor (10–1)	Wisconsin (10–2)	Auburn (9–3)	10.
11.	Oregon	Florida (1–0)	Utah (2–0)	Florida (3–0)	Notre Dame (2–1)	Texas (3–1)	Texas (4–1)	Auburn (5–1)	Oregon (6–1)	Auburn (6–2)	Baylor (8–0)	Baylor (9–0)	Minnesota (9–1)	Penn State (9–2)	Auburn (9–3)	Wisconsin (10–3)	11.
12.	Texas A&M	Texas A&M (1–0)	Texas (1–1)	Michigan (2–0)	Oregon (3–1)	Penn State (4–0)	Auburn (5–1)	Oregon (5–1)	Wisconsin (6–1)	Baylor (7–0)	Auburn (7–2)	Florida (8–2)	Michigan (8–2)	Michigan (9–2)	Penn State (10–2)	Utah (11–2)	12.
13.	Washington	Utah (1–0)	Wisconsin (2–0)	Wisconsin (2–0)	Penn State (3–0)	Oregon (3–1)	Oregon (4–1)	Boise State (6–0)	Utah (6–1)	Minnesota (8–0)	Minnesota (8–0)	Auburn (7–2)	Baylor (9–1)	Oregon (9–2)	Oregon (10–2)	Penn State (10–2)	13.
14.	Utah	Washington (1–0)	Penn State (2–0)	Penn State (3–0)	Iowa (3–0)	Iowa (4–0)	Boise State (5–0)	Texas (4–2)	Baylor (7–0)	Michigan (6–2) т	Michigan (7–2)	Michigan (7–2)	Wisconsin (8–2)	Wisconsin (9–2)	Minnesota (10–2)	Notre Dame (10–2)	14.
15.	Penn State	Penn State (1–0)	Oregon (1–1)	UCF (3–0)	California (4–0)	Washington (4–1)	Utah (4–1)	Utah (5–1)	Texas (5–2)	SMU (8–0) т	Notre Dame (6–2)	Wisconsin (7–2)	Notre Dame (8–2)	Notre Dame (9–2)	Notre Dame (10–2)	Minnesota (10–2)	15.
16.	Auburn	Wisconsin (1–0)	Texas A&M (1–1)	Oregon (2–1)	Boise State (4–0)	Boise State (4–0)	Michigan (4–1)	Michigan (5–1)	Minnesota (7–0)	Notre Dame (5–2)	Wisconsin (6–2)	Notre Dame (7–2)	Auburn (7–3)	Auburn (8–3)	Memphis (11–1)	Memphis (12–1)	16.
	Preseason Aug 19	Week 1 Sep 3	Week 2 Sep 8	Week 3 Sep 15	Week 4 Sep 22	Week 5 Sep 29	Week 6 Oct 6	Week 7 Oct 13	Week 8 Oct 20	Week 9 Oct 27	Week 10 Nov 3	Week 11 Nov 10	Week 12 Nov 17	Week 13 Nov 24	Week 14 Dec 1	Week 15 (Final) Dec 8	
		Dropped: Oregon (0–1)	Dropped: Washington (1–1)	Dropped: Texas A&M (2–1)	Dropped: Utah (3–1); Michigan (2–1); UCF (3–1)	Dropped: California (4–1)	Dropped: Iowa (4–1); Washington (4–2)	None	Dropped: Boise State (6–1); Michigan (5–2)	Dropped: Wisconsin (6–2); Texas (5–3)	Dropped: SMU (8–1)	None	None	None	Dropped: Michigan (9–3)	None	
