= Tony Jones Jr. =

American football player (born 1997)

Profile
- Position: Running back

Personal information
- Born: November 24, 1997 (age 28); St. Petersburg, Florida, U.S.
- Listed height: 5 ft 11 in (1.80 m)
- Listed weight: 224 lb (102 kg)

Career information
- High school: IMG Academy (Bradenton, Florida)
- College: Notre Dame (2016–2019)
- NFL draft: 2020: undrafted

Career history
- New Orleans Saints (2020–2022); Seattle Seahawks (2022); Denver Broncos (2023)*; New Orleans Saints (2023); Arizona Cardinals (2023–2024); Arlington Renegades (2025); BC Lions (2026)*
- * Offseason or practice squad member only

Career NFL statistics
- Rushing yards: 329
- Rushing average: 3.4
- Receptions: 17
- Receiving yards: 96
- Total touchdowns: 3
- Stats at Pro Football Reference

Tony Terrell Jones Jr. (born November 24, 1997) is an American professional football running back. He has previously played in the National Football League (NFL) for the New Orleans Saints and Seattle Seahawks. He played college football for the Notre Dame Fighting Irish.

== Early life ==
Jones Jr. attended St. Petersburg Catholic High School in St. Petersburg, Florida, before transferring to IMG Academy in Bradenton, Florida. He played baseball and football in high school. As a senior in football, he had 78 carries for 514 yards and 11 touchdowns. Jones Jr. played in the 2015 U.S. Army All-American Bowl. He committed to the University of Notre Dame to play college football.

== College career ==
Jones Jr. did not see the field as a true freshman in 2016. As a redshirt freshman at Notre Dame in 2017, Jones Jr. played in 12 games and had 44 carries for 232 yards and three touchdowns. As a redshirt sophomore in 2018, he played in 13 games and had 392 rushing yards and three touchdowns. Jones Jr. took over as the starting running back his redshirt junior year in 2019. He missed a game and a half due to cartilage damage in his ribs suffered during a loss to Michigan. Jones Jr. graduated in December and announced that he would not return to Notre Dame for his fifth year, in order to enter the 2020 NFL draft.

In the 2019 Camping World Bowl, Jones Jr. had a 84 yard touchdown run that broke the record for longest run in Notre Dame bowl game history. Jones Jr. rushed for 857 yards and six touchdowns in his senior season.

At the end of the season, Jones Jr. was selected to play in the 2020 East-West Shrine Game in his hometown of St. Petersburg, Florida.

== Professional career ==
Pre-draft measurables
| Height | Weight | Arm length | Hand span | Wingspan | 40-yard dash | 10-yard split | 20-yard split | 20-yard shuttle | Three-cone drill | Vertical jump | Broad jump | Bench press |
|---|---|---|---|---|---|---|---|---|---|---|---|---|
| 5 ft 10 1/2 in (1.79 m) | 220 lb (100 kg) | 30 5/8 in (0.78 m) | 9 1/2 in (0.24 m) | 6 ft 2 1/8 in (1.88 m) | 4.68 s | 1.58 s | 2.72 s | 4.21 s | 7.18 s | 32.5 in (0.83 m) | 9 ft 11 in (3.02 m) | 13 reps |
All values from NFL Combine

=== New Orleans Saints (first stint) ===
Jones Jr. signed with the New Orleans Saints as an undrafted free agent on April 27, 2020. He was waived during final roster cuts on September 5, 2020, and re-signed to the team's practice squad the next day. He was elevated to the active roster on January 2, 2021, for the team's Week 17 game against the Carolina Panthers, and reverted to the practice squad after the game. On January 18, 2021, Jones Jr. signed a reserve/futures contract with the Saints. On September 2, 2021, Jones Jr. made the 53-man roster for the Saints after rushing 106 yards on 12 carries and one touchdown, along with 42 receiving yards on six receptions in two preseason games. He suffered an ankle injury in Week 4 and was placed on injured reserve on October 6, 2021. He was activated on November 20.

On October 8, 2022, Jones Jr. was waived by the Saints.

=== Seattle Seahawks ===
On October 10, 2022, Jones Jr. was claimed off waivers by the Seattle Seahawks. He was waived on December 21 and signed to the practice squad on December 26. He was promoted to the active roster on January 13, 2023.

=== Denver Broncos ===
On March 23, 2023, Jones Jr. was signed by the Denver Broncos. On August 29, 2023, he was waived by the Broncos.

=== New Orleans Saints (second stint) ===
On August 30, 2023, Jones Jr. was signed by the Saints to their practice squad. Jones Jr. was elevated to the active roster on September 18 and ran for 34 yards on 12 carries and scored his first two NFL career touchdowns against the Carolina Panthers following an injury to Jamaal Williams late in the first half of the Saints' Week 2 game. Following the game, Jones Jr. was signed to the active roster on September 20, 2023. He was released on October 7.

=== Arizona Cardinals ===
On October 9, 2023, Jones Jr. was claimed off waivers by the Arizona Cardinals. He was waived on October 19, and re-signed to the practice squad. Jones Jr. was signed to the active roster on November 2. He was released on November 9, but re-signed to the practice squad two days later. He signed a reserve/future contract on January 8, 2024. He was released following an injury on August 27, 2024.

On December 18, 2024, the Cardinals re–signed Jones Jr. to their practice squad.

=== Arlington Renegades ===
On May 7, 2025, Jones Jr. signed with the Arlington Renegades of the United Football League (UFL).

=== BC Lions ===
On January 26, 2026, Jones Jr. left the Renegades to sign with the BC Lions of the Canadian Football League (CFL). On May 12, 2026, Jones Jr. was released by the Lions as part of their initial round of preseason roster cuts but was re-signed nine days later. On May 25, he was released again following the Lions first 2026 preseason game.

== NFL career statistics ==
Legend
| **Bold** | Career high |

| Year | Team | Games | | Rushing | | | | | Receiving | | | | | Returning | | | | | Fumbles | |
| Year | Team | GP | GS | Att | Yds | Avg | Lng | TD | Rec | Yds | Avg | Lng | TD | Ret | Yds | Avg | Lng | TD | Fum | Lost |
|---|---|---|---|---|---|---|---|---|---|---|---|---|---|---|---|---|---|---|---|---|
| 2020 | NO | 1 | 1 | 3 | 13 | **4.3** | 6 | 0 | 0 | 0 | 0 | 0 | 0 | 0 | 0 | 0 | 0 | 0 | 0 | 0 |
| 2021 | NO | **11** | **4** | **54** | **142** | 2.6 | 11 | 0 | **5** | **29** | 5.8 | **19** | 0 | **1** | **5** | **5** | **5** | 0 | 0 | 0 |
| 2022 | NO | 2 | 0 | 2 | 8 | 4 | 6 | 0 | 2 | 12 | **6** | 7 | 0 | 0 | 0 | 0 | 0 | 0 | 0 | 0 |
| 2022 | SEA | 4 | 0 | 8 | 16 | 2 | 7 | 0 | 3 | 18 | **6** | 9 | 0 | 0 | 0 | 0 | 0 | 0 | 0 | 0 |
| 2023 | NO | 4 | 1 | 21 | 70 | 3.3 | **19** | **2** | 4 | 21 | 5.3 | 10 | 0 | 0 | 0 | 0 | 0 | 0 | 0 | 0 |
| 2023 | ARI | 3 | 0 | 5 | 25 | 5.0 | 13 | 0 | 3 | 16 | 5.3 | 11 | 0 | 0 | 0 | 0 | 0 | 0 | 0 | 0 |
| Career | | 25 | 6 | 93 | 274 | 2.9 | 19 | 2 | 17 | 96 | 5.6 | 19 | 0 | 1 | 5 | 5 | 5 | 0 | 0 | 0 |

== Personal life ==
Jones Jr.' father Tony Jones Sr. was a fullback and linebacker for Illinois State, as well as the Cleveland Thunderbolts, Tampa Bay Storm, and Buffalo Destroyers of the Arena Football League.

At Notre Dame, Jones Jr. majored in Film, Television and Theatre. During the 2019 college football season, Jones Jr. filmed his first film, a short film entitled "Come Together" written and directed with classmate Conor Fitzgerald, starring football teammate Ovie Oghoufo and fellow FTT student and stage actress Teagan Earley. The short film premiered at the 2020 Sundial Film Festival in Redding, California.
