= Claypool, Summers County, West Virginia =

Unincorporated community in West Virginia, United States

Claypool, West Virginia
- Unincorporated community
- Location within West Virginia Location within the United States
- Coordinates: 37°49′58″N 80°52′14″W
- Country: United States
- State: West Virginia
- County: Summers
- Elevation: 1,909 ft (582 m)
- Time zone: UTC-5 (Eastern (EST))
  - Summer (DST): UTC-4 (EDT)
- Area codes: 304 & 681
- GNIS feature ID: 1554141

Claypool is an unincorporated community in Summers County, West Virginia, United States, located south of Meadow Bridge. It was also known as Humoco or Tina, a defunct coal town.
