= Chase Claypool =

Canadian gridiron football player (born 1998)

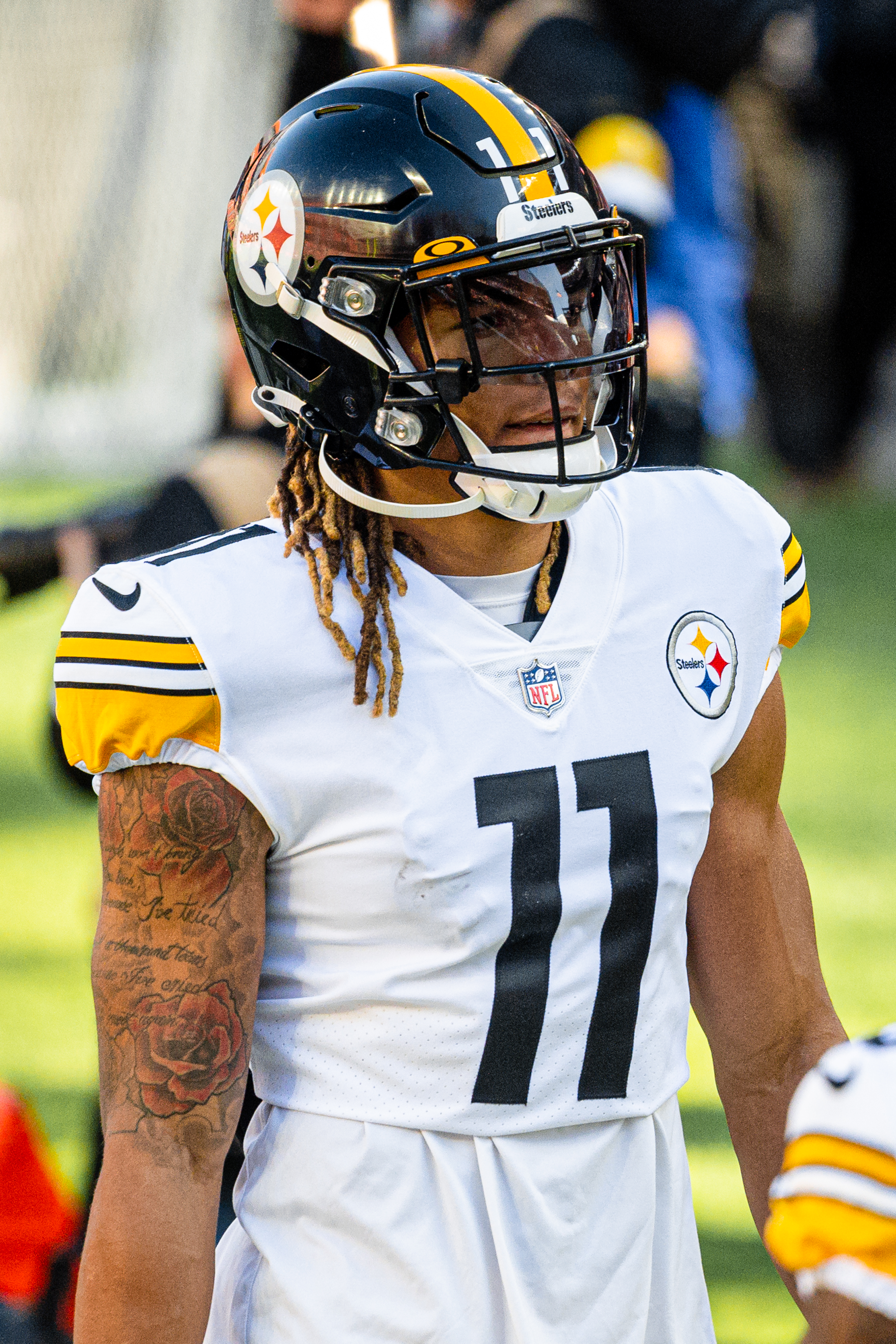
- Claypool with the Pittsburgh Steelers in 2021

Profile
- Position: Wide receiver

Personal information
- Born: July 7, 1998 (age 28); Abbotsford, British Columbia, Canada
- Listed height: 6 ft 4 in (1.93 m)
- Listed weight: 238 lb (108 kg)

Career information
- High school: Abbotsford
- College: Notre Dame (2016–2019)
- NFL draft: 2020: 2nd round, 49th overall pick

Career history
- Pittsburgh Steelers (2020–2022); Chicago Bears (2022–2023); Miami Dolphins (2023); Buffalo Bills (2024)*
- * Offseason or practice squad member only

Awards and highlights
- PFWA All-Rookie Team (2020)

Career NFL statistics
- Receptions: 175
- Receiving yards: 2,261
- Receiving touchdowns: 13
- Stats at Pro Football Reference

Chase Claypool (born July 7, 1998) is a Canadian professional football wide receiver. He played college football for the Notre Dame Fighting Irish and was selected by the Pittsburgh Steelers in the second round of the 2020 NFL draft. He has also played in the NFL for the Chicago Bears, Miami Dolphins, and Buffalo Bills.

== Early life ==
Claypool attended Abbotsford Senior Secondary School in Abbotsford, British Columbia, Canada where he played both basketball and AA football in his senior years and graduated in 2016. During his career, he set numerous school receiving records. After receiving recruitment offers from several top-tier US colleges, Claypool decided to commit to the University of Notre Dame to play college football.

== College career ==
Claypool played in 12 games as a true freshman at Notre Dame in 2016. He finished the season with five receptions for 81 yards and led the team in special teams tackles with 11. As a sophomore in 2017, he started eight of 12 games, recording 29 receptions for 402 yards and two touchdowns. As a junior in 2018, Claypool started 12 of 13 games, finishing second on the team with 50 receptions for 639 yards and four touchdowns. Claypool took over as Notre Dame's number one receiver his senior year in 2019, a season in which he caught 66 passes for 1,037 yards and 13 touchdowns.

== Professional career ==
Pre-draft measurables
Height	Weight	Arm length	Hand span	Wingspan	40-yard dash	10-yard split	20-yard split	Vertical jump	Broad jump	Bench press	Wonderlic
6 ft 4 1/4 in (1.94 m)	238 lb (108 kg)	32 1/2 in (0.83 m)	9 7/8 in (0.25 m)	6 ft 8 in (2.03 m)	4.42 s	1.52 s	2.57 s	40.5 in (1.03 m)	10 ft 6 in (3.20 m)	19 reps	27
All values from NFL Combine

=== Pittsburgh Steelers ===
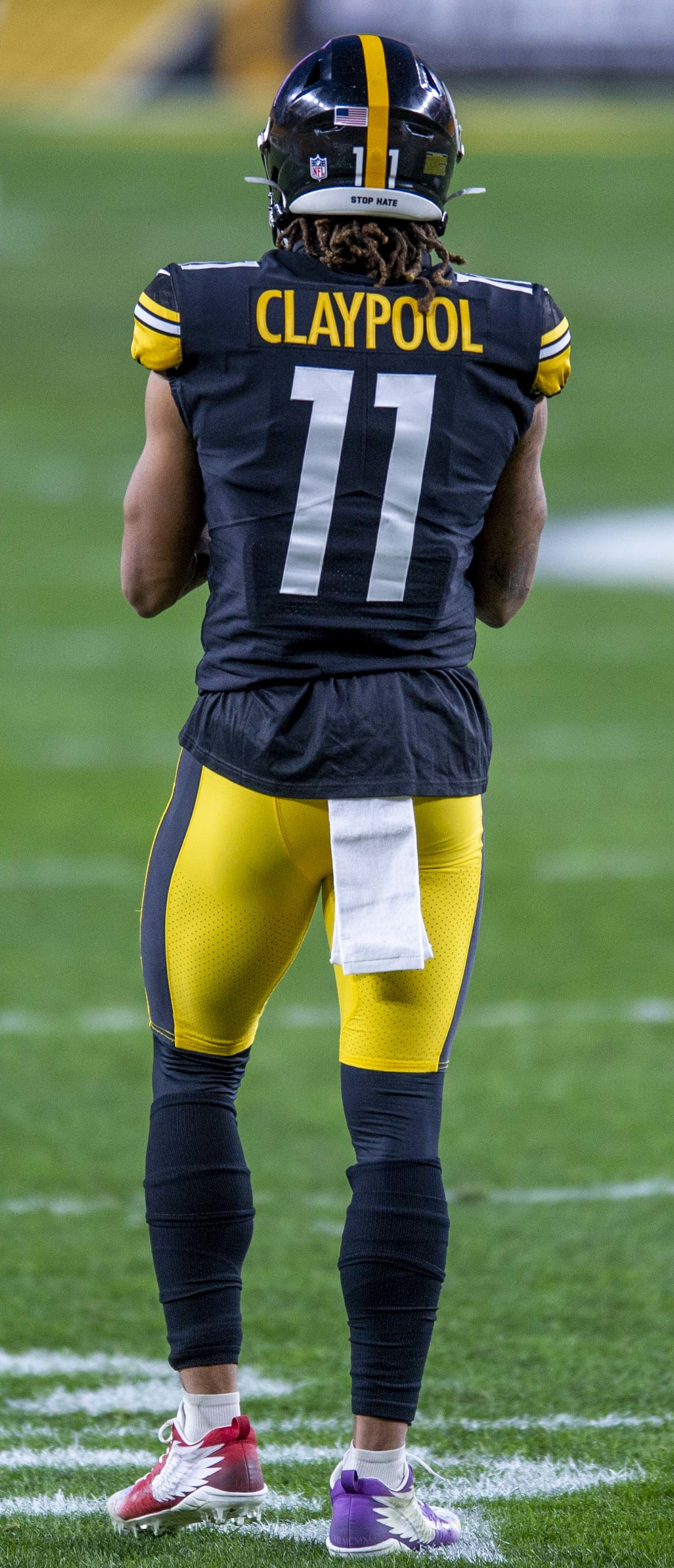
Claypool in 2020

Claypool was selected by the Pittsburgh Steelers in the second round, 49th overall, in the 2020 NFL draft as the team's first selection. Although eligible as a Canadian and rated as the No. 2 prospect, Claypool went undrafted in the 2020 CFL draft.

On July 22, 2020, the Steelers signed Claypool to a four-year, $6.61 million rookie contract that includes $3.28 million guaranteed and a signing bonus $2.37 million. On September 20, during Week 2 against the Denver Broncos, Claypool finished with three receptions for 88 receiving yards, including an 84-yard touchdown, as the Steelers won 26–21. In Week 5, against the Philadelphia Eagles, Claypool finished with 110 receiving yards and four total touchdowns (three receiving & one rushing), both career highs, as the Steelers won 38–29. With his Week 5 effort, Claypool became the first Steelers rookie in franchise history to score four touchdowns in a game, and the first Steeler since Roy Jefferson in 1968 to do so. His performance helped the team start out with a 4–0 record for the first time since 1979. On October 14, Claypool was named the AFC Offensive Player of the Week for his performance in Week 5. In Week 10, against the Cincinnati Bengals, he had four receptions for 56 receiving yards and two receiving touchdowns in their 36–10 victory.

Claypool had a successful rookie year, catching 62 passes for 873 yards and 9 touchdowns, in addition to two rushing touchdowns. He was named to the PFWA All-Rookie Team. In the Wild Card round of the playoffs against the Cleveland Browns, Claypool recorded 5 catches for 59 yards and two touchdowns during the 48–37 loss.

The following season, during a game against the Minnesota Vikings, Claypool, who had already been pulled from the game earlier for poking Vikings cornerback Bashaud Breeland in the face, received criticism after celebrating a first down reception while the Steelers were trailing 36–28 with just 30 seconds left in the game. The celebration, which was noted by CBS Sports to take "at least 5 seconds" off the clock, wound up being costly as the Steelers could not score in time and lost the game. Overall, Claypool played in 15 games in 2021, starting 13, and posted similar catch and yardage totals compared to his rookie season, though he only caught two touchdowns. He missed two games due to injuries to his hamstring and toe, respectively.

=== Chicago Bears ===
Claypool was traded to the Chicago Bears on November 1, 2022, in exchange for their second-round pick (32nd overall; later used to select Joey Porter Jr.) in the 2023 NFL draft.

He was intensely criticized for a low-effort performance in the Bears' 2023 season opener against the Green Bay Packers. It was reported on September 17 that Claypool had apologized for this to his teammates and coaches. By week 4, Claypool expressed frustration with the Bears and stated that he did not believe the coaching staff put him in a position to succeed. The Bears deactivated him before their week 4 matchup against the Broncos, and activated Equanimeous St. Brown in his place. Claypool had been told by the team to stay home during the Denver game, and was later told not to return to their facility while they searched for a trade partner the following week. The team had instructed him to remain at home the following week as well, while they won in a Thursday Night Football road game (their first win since October 24, 2022) against the Washington Commanders.

As a Bear, he appeared in ten games, recording 191 receiving yards and one touchdown on 18 receptions.

=== Miami Dolphins ===
On October 6, 2023, the Bears traded Claypool and a seventh-round selection in the 2025 NFL draft to the Miami Dolphins in exchange for a sixth-round selection in the 2025 NFL Draft. In Week 8 vs. the New England Patriots, Claypool caught 1 pass for 15 yards, his first reception with the Dolphins.

=== Buffalo Bills ===
On May 3, 2024, Claypool signed a one-year contract with the Buffalo Bills. On August 12, Claypool was placed on injured reserve after tearing a ligament and tendon in his second toe. He was released with an injury settlement on August 15.

In July 2025, Claypool announced he was attempting to return to the NFL. In May 2026, Claypool tried out for the Green Bay Packers.

== Career statistics ==
=== NFL ===
Legend
**Bold**	Career best

==== Regular season ====
Year	Team	Games		Receiving					Rushing					Fumbles	
Year	Team	GP	GS	Rec	Yds	Avg	Lng	TD	Att	Yds	Avg	Lng	TD	Fum	Lost
2020	PIT	16	6	**62**	**873**	14.1	**84T**	**9**	10	16	1.6	8	**2**	3	1
2021	PIT	15	13	59	860	**14.6**	59	2	**14**	**96**	**6.9**	**25**	0	**0**	**0**
2022	PIT	8	8	32	311	9.7	26	1	8	55	**6.9**	15	0	**0**	**0**
2022	CHI	7	3	14	140	10.0	31	0	1	4	4.0	4	0	1	1
2023	CHI	3	2	4	51	12.8	20	1	0	0	0.0	0	0	**0**	**0**
2023	MIA	9	0	4	26	6.5	15	0	0	0	0.0	0	0	**0**	**0**
Career		58	32	175	2,261	12.9	84	13	33	171	5.2	25	2	4	2

==== Postseason ====
Year	Team	Games		Receiving				
Year	Team	GP	GS	Rec	Yds	Avg	Lng	TD
2020	PIT	1	1	**5**	**59**	**11.8**	**29**	**2**
2021	PIT	1	1	3	25	8.3	16	0
2023	MIA	1	0	0	0	0.0	0	0
Career		3	2	8	84	10.5	29	2

=== College ===
Season	Team	GP	Rec	Yds	TD
2016	Notre Dame	12	5	81	0
2017	Notre Dame	12	29	402	2
2018	Notre Dame	13	50	639	4
2019	Notre Dame	13	**66**	**1,037**	**13**
Totals		50	150	2,159	19
