= 2018 Notre Dame Fighting Irish football team =

American college football season

2018 Notre Dame Fighting Irish football

Cotton Bowl Classic (CFP Semifinal), L 3–30 vs. Clemson
- Conference: Independent

Ranking
- Coaches: No. 5
- AP: No. 5
- Record: 12–1
- Head coach: Brian Kelly (9th season)
- Offensive coordinator: Chip Long (2nd season)
- Offensive scheme: Spread
- Defensive coordinator: Clark Lea (1st season)
- Base defense: 4–2–5
- MVP: Ian Book
- Captains: Alex Bars; Sam Mustipher; Tyler Newsome; Drue Tranquill
- Home stadium: Notre Dame Stadium

2018 NCAA Division I FBS independents football records
	Conf.			Overall
Team	W		L	W		L
No. 5 Notre Dame ^		–		12	–	1
No. 19 Army		–		11	–	2
BYU		–		7	–	6
Liberty		–		6	–	6
UMass		–		4	–	8
New Mexico State		–		3	–	9
^ – College Football Playoff participant; Rankings from AP Poll

The 2018 Notre Dame Fighting Irish football team was an American football team that represented the University of Notre Dame as an independent during the 2018 NCAA Division I FBS football season. In their ninth year under head coach Brian Kelly, the Irish compiled a 12–1 record, outscored opponents by a total of 408 to 237, and were ranked No. 5 in both the final AP and Coaches Polls. In four regular-season games against ranked opponents, the Irish defeated No. 14 Michigan, No. 7 Stanford, No. 24 Virginia Tech and No. 12 Syracuse. They finished the regular season with a perfect 12–0 record, and were ranked No. 3 in the final College Football Playoff rankings. They concluded the season with a 30–3 loss to eventual national champion Clemson in the college football playoff semifinal in the Cotton Bowl.

Quarterback Brandon Wimbush led the offense for the first three games, after which he was benched in favor of Ian Book. Book ended the year with 2,628 passing yards and 19 touchdowns. The running attack was led by Dexter Williams, finishing with 995 yards and 12 touchdowns. On defense, cornerback Julian Love was named a consensus first-team All-American, and defensive tackle Jerry Tillery also received All-America honors by several selectors. Head coach Brian Kelly was named AP Coach of the Year.

The team played its home games at Notre Dame Stadium in Notre Dame, Indiana.

== Off-season ==
Fans were disappointed by defensive coordinator Mike Elko leaving for Texas A&M, hired by first-year head coach Jimbo Fisher three days after the Citrus Bowl victory over LSU. Brian Kelly would replace Elko by elevating linebackers coach Clark Lea to defensive coordinator. Notre Dame hired Terry Joseph as safety coach to support defensive coordinator Clark Lea's staff.

One week after Elko's departure, the Irish suffered another significant coaching loss, as Harry Hiestand accepted the offensive line coach position on Matt Nagy's staff with the Chicago Bears. In a surprise decision and after a national search, head coach Brian Kelly chose to promote senior offensive analyst Jeff Quinn to replace Hiestad.

The unexpected personnel loss within the program eventually spread to the roster, as running backs C.J. Holmes and Deon McIntosh, wide receiver Kevin Stepherson, and defensive lineman Brandon Tiassum were each dismissed from the program. Holmes and Stepherson were dismissed due to shoplifting charges, while McIntosh and Tiassum were also removed for a violation of team rules.

Notre Dame finished National Signing Day with the nation's 10th-ranked recruiting class, per 247sports.com.

=== The Shirt 2018 and Blue-Gold Game ===
The 2018 Notre Dame Football Shirt was revealed in front of the Hammes Notre Dame Bookstore at the Eck Center with Coach Kelly ripping off his jacket to reveal a Kelly green shirt. The front of The Shirt features an iconic image of the top of the outside of the stadium directly above the Knute Rockne Gate, which displays "University of Notre Dame" etched in gold under two flags–one for Notre Dame and the other for the team that the Irish played that week. Below this image is "Fighting Irish Football 2018," printed in large gold letters. The back of The Shirt features a portrayal of Notre Dame's defensive line with "No Breaking Point" printed below it, which is a reference to one of late coach Ara Parseghian's famous mottos. The Shirt would then be sold immediately following its reveal.

After Winter and Spring practices Notre Dame would host an exhibition game at Notre Dame Stadium on April 21, 2018, with its offense playing against its defense with Blue defeating Gold 47–44.

=== Preseason award watch lists ===
Award	Player	Position	Year
Lott Trophy	Te'von Coney	LB	SR
Lott Trophy	Drue Tranquill	LB	SR
Rimington Trophy	Sam Mustipher	C	SR
Chuck Bednarik Award	Te’Von Coney	LB	SR
Chuck Bednarik Award	Jerry Tillery	DE	SR
Maxwell Award	Brandon Wimbush	QB	JR
John Mackey Award	Alizé Mack	TE	JR
Butkus Award	Te'Von Coney	LB	SR
Butkus Award	Drue Tranquill	LB	SR
Jim Thorpe Award	Julian Love	CB	JR
Bronko Nagurski Trophy	Te'Von Coney	LB	SR
Bronko Nagurski Trophy	Julian Love	CB	JR
Bronko Nagurski Trophy	Jerry Tillery	DE	SR
Outland Trophy	Alex Bars	OL	SR
Outland Trophy	Sam Mustipher	C	SR
Outland Trophy	Jerry Tillery	DT	SR
Lou Groza Award	Justin Yoon	K	SR
Wuerffel Trophy	Tyler Newsome	P	SR
Wuerffel Trophy	Drue Tranquill	LB	SR
Wuerffel Trophy	Nic Weisher	TE	SR
Walter Camp Award	Brandon Wimbush	QB	JR
Ted Hendricks Award	Jerry Tillery	DE	SR
Johnny Unitas Golden Arm Award	Brandon Wimbush	QB	JR
Manning Award	Brandon Wimbush	QB	JR

=== 2018 NFL draft ===
The following former Notre Dame players were selected in the 2018 NFL draft:

Round	Selection	Player	Position	Team
1	6	Quenton Nelson	Guard	Indianapolis Colts
1	9	Mike McGlinchey	Tackle	San Francisco 49ers
4	123	Durham Smythe	Tight end	Miami Dolphins
6	207	Equanimeous St. Brown	Wide receiver	Green Bay Packers

=== Transfers out/departures ===
- QB Montgomery Van Gorder (graduate transfer)
- RB Josh Adams (Declared for NFL Draft)
- RB C.J. Holmes (Dismissed from program)
- RB Deon McIntosh (Dismissed from program)
- WR Freddy Canteen (transfer)
- WR C. J. Sanders (transfer)
- WR Kevin Stepherson (Dismissed from program)
- WR Equanimeous St. Brown (Declared for NFL Draft)
- DE Jay Hayes (graduate transfer)
- DE Jonathon MacCollister (transfer)
- DT Elijah Taylor (transfer)
- DT Brandon Tiassum (Dismissed from program)
- DT Pete Mokwuah (graduate transfer)
- CB Nick Watkins (graduate transfer)
- CB Ashton White (transfer)

=== Transfers in ===
- FB Keenan Sweeney (graduate transfer)

=== Coaching changes ===
Departures

- Mike Elko – accepted defensive coordinator position at Texas A&M
- Harry Hiestand – accepted offensive line coach position with the Chicago Bears
- Tyler Santucci – accepted defensive analyst position at Texas A&M

Additions

- Clark Lea – promoted from linebackers coach to defensive coordinator
- Terry Joseph – hired as safeties coach after spending one year as defensive backs coach at North Carolina
- Jeff Quinn – promoted from senior offensive analyst to offensive line coach

=== Recruiting ===
==== Position key ====
Back	B	Center	C	Cornerback	CB	Defensive back	DB
Defensive end	DE	Defensive lineman	DL	Defensive tackle	DT	End	E
Fullback	FB	Guard	G	Halfback	HB	Kicker	K
Kickoff returner	KR	Offensive tackle	OT	Offensive lineman	OL	Linebacker	LB
Long snapper	LS	Punter	P	Punt returner	PR	Quarterback	QB
Running back	RB	Safety	S	Tight end	TE	Wide receiver	WR

==== Recruits ====
Notre Dame signed 21 recruits during college football's second-ever early signing period (December 20–22) before inking an additional six on National Signing Day.

College recruiting (2018)
Name	Hometown	School	Height	Weight	Commit date
Houston Griffith; CB	Chicago, Illinois	IMG Academy	6 ft 1 in (1.85 m)	192 lb (87 kg)	Dec 12, 2017
Houston Griffith; CB	Recruit ratings: Scout: Rivals: 247Sports: ESPN:				
Phil Jurkovec; QB	Gibsonia, Pennsylvania	Pine-Richland High School	6 ft 5 in (1.96 m)	215 lb (98 kg)	May 16, 2017
Phil Jurkovec; QB	Recruit ratings: Scout: Rivals: 247Sports: ESPN:				
Derrik Allen; S	Marietta, Georgia	Lassiter High School	6 ft 2 in (1.88 m)	211 lb (96 kg)	Feb 13, 2017
Derrik Allen; S	Recruit ratings: Scout: Rivals: 247Sports: ESPN:				
Kevin Austin Jr. WR	Pompano Beach, Florida	North Broward Preparatory School	6 ft 3 in (1.91 m)	198 lb (90 kg)	Aug 11, 2017
Kevin Austin Jr. WR	Recruit ratings: Scout: Rivals: 247Sports: ESPN:				
Jack Lamb; LB	Temecula, California	Great Oak High School	6 ft 4 in (1.93 m)	220 lb (100 kg)	Jul 27, 2017
Jack Lamb; LB	Recruit ratings: Scout: Rivals: 247Sports: ESPN:				
Shayne Simon; LB	Jersey City, New Jersey	St. Peter's Preparatory School	6 ft 3 in (1.91 m)	215 lb (98 kg)	Jul 25, 2017
Shayne Simon; LB	Recruit ratings: Scout: Rivals: 247Sports: ESPN:				
Jayson Ademilola; DT	Jersey City, New Jersey	St. Peter's Preparatory School	6 ft 3 in (1.91 m)	290 lb (130 kg)	Jun 26, 2016
Jayson Ademilola; DT	Recruit ratings: Scout: Rivals: 247Sports: ESPN:				
Braden Lenzy; ATH	Portland, Oregon	Tigard High School	6 ft 0 in (1.83 m)	175 lb (79 kg)	Dec 22, 2017
Braden Lenzy; ATH	Recruit ratings: Scout: Rivals: 247Sports: ESPN:				
George Takacs; TE	Naples, Florida	Gulf Coast High School	6 ft 7 in (2.01 m)	242 lb (110 kg)	Jun 14, 2017
George Takacs; TE	Recruit ratings: Scout: Rivals: 247Sports: ESPN:				
Matthew "Bo" Bauer; LB	Erie, Pennsylvania	Cathedral Preparatory School	6 ft 2.5 in (1.89 m)	222 lb (101 kg)	Aug 3, 2017
Matthew "Bo" Bauer; LB	Recruit ratings: Scout: Rivals: 247Sports: ESPN:				
Micah Jones; WR	Gurnee, Illinois	Warren Township High School	6 ft 5 in (1.96 m)	206 lb (93 kg)	Feb 17, 2017
Micah Jones; WR	Recruit ratings: Scout: Rivals: 247Sports: ESPN:				
Lawrence Keys III; WR	New Orleans, Louisiana	McDonogh 35 High School	5 ft 10.5 in (1.79 m)	160 lb (73 kg)	Feb 7, 2018
Lawrence Keys III; WR	Recruit ratings: Scout: Rivals: 247Sports: ESPN:				
Jarrett Patterson; OT	Mission Viejo, California	Mission Viejo High School	6 ft 5 in (1.96 m)	285 lb (129 kg)	Feb 7, 2018
Jarrett Patterson; OT	Recruit ratings: Scout: Rivals: 247Sports: ESPN:				
Noah Boykin; CB	Washington, D.C.	H.D. Woodson High School	6 ft 2 in (1.88 m)	170 lb (77 kg)	Feb 7, 2018
Noah Boykin; CB	Recruit ratings: Scout: Rivals: 247Sports: ESPN:				
D.J. Brown; CB	Washington, D.C.	St. John's College High School	6 ft 1 in (1.85 m)	185 lb (84 kg)	Feb 7, 2018
D.J. Brown; CB	Recruit ratings: Scout: Rivals: 247Sports: ESPN:				
TaRiq Bracy; ATH	Milpitas, California	Milpitas High School	6 ft 0 in (1.83 m)	170 lb (77 kg)	Dec 10, 2017
TaRiq Bracy; ATH	Recruit ratings: Scout: Rivals: 247Sports: ESPN:				
Tommy Tremble; TE	Norcross, Georgia	Wesleyan School	6 ft 4 in (1.93 m)	225 lb (102 kg)	Dec 14, 2017
Tommy Tremble; TE	Recruit ratings: Scout: Rivals: 247Sports: ESPN:				
John Dirksen; OT	Maria Stein, Ohio	Marion Local High School	6 ft 5 in (1.96 m)	305 lb (138 kg)	Mar 25, 2017
John Dirksen; OT	Recruit ratings: Scout: Rivals: 247Sports: ESPN:				
Ovie Oghoufo; LB	Farmington, Michigan	Harrison High School	6 ft 3 in (1.91 m)	215 lb (98 kg)	Jul 22, 2017
Ovie Oghoufo; LB	Recruit ratings: Scout: Rivals: 247Sports: ESPN:				
Ja'Mion Franklin; DT	Ridgely, Maryland	North Caroline High School	6 ft 1 in (1.85 m)	295 lb (134 kg)	Jun 6, 2017
Ja'Mion Franklin; DT	Recruit ratings: Scout: Rivals: 247Sports: ESPN:				
Jahmir Smith; RB	Sanford, North Carolina	Lee County High School	6 ft 0 in (1.83 m)	205 lb (93 kg)	Jul 23, 2017
Jahmir Smith; RB	Recruit ratings: Scout: Rivals: 247Sports: ESPN:				
Justin Ademilola; DE	Jersey City, New Jersey	St. Peter's Preparatory School	6 ft 3 in (1.91 m)	240 lb (110 kg)	Jun 26, 2016
Justin Ademilola; DE	Recruit ratings: Scout: Rivals: 247Sports: ESPN:				
Cole Mabry; OT	Brentwood, Tennessee	Brentwood High School	6 ft 6 in (1.98 m)	275 lb (125 kg)	Feb 14, 2017
Cole Mabry; OT	Recruit ratings: Scout: Rivals: 247Sports: ESPN:				
Luke Jones; OT	Little Rock, Arkansas	Pulaski Academy	6 ft 5 in (1.96 m)	292 lb (132 kg)	Dec 27, 2017
Luke Jones; OT	Recruit ratings: Scout: Rivals: 247Sports: ESPN:				
Joe Wilkins, Jr. ATH	North Fort Myers, Florida	North Fort Myers High School	6 ft 2 in (1.88 m)	180 lb (82 kg)	Nov 6, 2017
Joe Wilkins, Jr. ATH	Recruit ratings: Scout: Rivals: 247Sports: ESPN:				
Paul Moala; S	Mishawaka, Indiana	Penn High School	6 ft 0 in (1.83 m)	200 lb (91 kg)	Oct 22, 2017
Paul Moala; S	Recruit ratings: Scout: Rivals: 247Sports: ESPN:				
C'Bo Flemister; RB	Zebulon, Georgia	Pike County High School	5 ft 11 in (1.80 m)	197 lb (89 kg)	Feb 7, 2018
C'Bo Flemister; RB	Recruit ratings: Scout: Rivals: 247Sports: ESPN:				
Overall recruit ranking:
Note: In many cases, Scout, Rivals, 247Sports, On3, and ESPN may conflict in their listings of height and weight.; In these cases, the average was taken. ESPN grades are on a 100-point scale.; Sources:

== Schedule ==
Date	Time	Opponent	Rank	Site	TV	Result	Attendance
September 1	7:30 p.m.	No. 14 Michigan	No. 12	Notre Dame Stadium; Notre Dame, IN (rivalry, College GameDay)	NBC	W 24–17	77,622
September 8	3:30 p.m.	Ball State	No. 8	Notre Dame Stadium; Notre Dame, IN	NBC	W 24–16	77,622
September 15	2:30 p.m.	Vanderbilt	No. 8	Notre Dame Stadium; Notre Dame, IN	NBC	W 22–17	77,622
September 22	12:00 p.m.	at Wake Forest	No. 8	BB&T Field; Winston-Salem, NC	ABC	W 56–27	31,092
September 29	7:30 p.m.	No. 7 Stanford	No. 8	Notre Dame Stadium; Notre Dame, IN (rivalry)	NBC	W 38–17	77,622
October 6	8:00 p.m.	at No. 24 Virginia Tech	No. 6	Lane Stadium; Blacksburg, VA	ABC	W 45–23	65,632
October 13	2:30 p.m.	Pittsburgh	No. 5	Notre Dame Stadium; Notre Dame, IN (rivalry)	NBC	W 19–14	77,622
October 27	8:00 p.m.	vs. Navy	No. 3	SDCCU Stadium; San Diego, CA (rivalry)	CBS	W 44–22	63,626
November 3	7:15 p.m.	at Northwestern	No. 4	Ryan Field; Evanston, IL (rivalry)	ESPN	W 31–21	47,330
November 10	7:30 p.m.	Florida State	No. 3	Notre Dame Stadium; Notre Dame, IN (rivalry)	NBC	W 42–13	77,622
November 17	2:30 p.m.	vs. No. 12 Syracuse	No. 3	Yankee Stadium; Bronx, NY (Shamrock Series)	NBC	W 36–3	48,104
November 24	8:00 p.m.	at USC	No. 3	Los Angeles Memorial Coliseum; Los Angeles, CA (rivalry)	ABC	W 24–17	59,821
December 29	4:00 p.m.	vs. No. 2 Clemson	No. 3	AT&T Stadium; Arlington, TX (Cotton Bowl Classic–CFP Semifinal)	ESPN	L 3–30	72,183
Rankings from AP Poll and CFP Rankings after October 30 released prior to game; All times are in Eastern time

== Personnel ==
2018 Notre Dame Fighting Irish football team roster
Players
Coaches
Offense

Pos.	#	Name	Class
RB	2	Dexter Williams	Sr
QB	3	Avery Davis	So
WR	4	Kevin Austin Jr.	Fr
RB	6	Tony Jones Jr.	Jr
QB	7	Brandon Wimbush	Sr
WR	8	Jafar Armstrong	So
WR	10	Chris Finke	Sr
QB	12	Ian Book	Jr
WR	13	Lawrence Keys III	Fr
QB	14	J.D. Carney	So
QB	15	Phil Jurkovec	Fr
RB	16	Cameron Ekanayake	So
QB	17	Nolan Henry	Sr
WR	17	Isaiah Robertson	So
WR	18	Joe Wilkins	Fr
RB	20	C'Bo Flemister	Fr
TE	24	Tommy Tremble	Fr
WR	25	Braden Lenzy	Fr
WR	26	Leo Albano	Fr
WR	27	Arion Shinaver	Jr
WR	29	Matt Salerno	Fr
QB	31	Cole Capen	Fr
RB	32	Mick Assaf	Jr
RB	33	Keenan Sweeney	GS
RB	34	Jahmir Smith	Fr
WR	43	Greg Mailey	Fr
TE	48	Xavier Lezynski	So
TE	49	Jack Henige	So
OL	53	Sam Mustipher	GS
OL	55	Jarrett Patterson	Fr
OL	56	John Dirksen	Fr
OL	57	Trevor Ruhland	Sr
OL	58	Darnell Ewell	So
OL	60	Cole Mabry	Fr
OL	61	Colin Grunhard	So
OL	62	Logan Plantz	Sr
OL	64	Max Siegel	Fr
OL	69	Aaron Banks	So
OL	70	Luke Jones	Fr
OL	71	Alex Bars	GS
OL	72	Robert Hainsey	So
OL	74	Liam Eichenberg	Jr
OL	75	Josh Lugg	So
OL	76	Dillan Gibbons	So
OL	78	Tommy Kraemer	Jr
WR	80	Micah Jones	Fr
WR	81	Miles Boykin	Sr
TE	82	Nic Weishar	GS
WR	83	Chase Claypool	Jr
TE	84	Cole Kmet	So
TE	85	George Takacs	Fr
TE	86	Alizé Mack	Sr
WR	87	Michael Young	So
WR	88	Javon McKinley	Jr
TE	89	Brock Wright	So

Defense

Pos.	#	Name	Class
LB	2	Jordan Genmark Heath	So
DB	3	Houston Griffith	Fr
LB	4	Te'von Coney	Sr
CB	5	Troy Pride Jr.	Jr
DB	7	Derrik Allen	Fr
CB	8	Donte Vaughn	Jr
DL	9	Daelin Hayes	Jr
S	11	Alohi Gilman	Jr
DB	12	DJ Brown	Fr
DB	13	Paul Moala	Fr
S	14	Devin Studstill	Jr
LB	15	D.J. Morgan	Jr
DB	16	Noah Boykin	Fr
DL	19	Justin Ademilola	Fr
CB	20	Shaun Crawford	Sr
S	21	Jalen Elliott	Jr
LB	22	Asmar Bilal	Sr
LB	23	Drue Tranquill	GS
S	24	Nick Coleman	Sr
DB	25	John Mahoney	So
CB	26	Temitope Agoro	Jr
CB	27	Julian Love	Jr
S	28	Nicco Fertitta	Sr
LB	29	Ovie Oghoufo	Fr
LB	30	Jeremiah Owusu-Koramoah	So
LB	31	Jack Lamb	Fr
S	32	Patrick Pelini	So
LB	33	Shayne Simon	Fr
DB	35	TaRiq Bracy	Fr
CB	36	Brian Ball	Sr
LB	37	Robert Regan	Sr
S	38	Christopher Schilling	Jr
CB	39	Brandon Garcia	So
LB	40	Drew White	So
DL	41	Kurt Hinish	So
DL	42	Julian Okwara	Jr
DB	43	Marcus Thorne	Fr
DL	44	Jamir Jones	Jr
LB	45	Jonathan Jones	Jr
LB	46	Jimmy Thompson	Sr
DL	47	Kofi Wardlow	So
DL	49	Brandon Hutson	Sr
LB	51	Devyn Spruell	Sr
LB	52	Bo Bauer	Fr
DL	53	Khalid Kareem	Jr
DL	54	Lincoln Feist	Sr
DL	55	Jonathan Bonner	GS
DL	57	Jayson Ademilola	Fr
LB	59	Kier Murphy	Sr
DL	91	Adetokunbo Ogundeji	Jr
DL	95	Myron Tagovailoa-Amosa	So
DL	97	Micah Dew-Treadway	Sr
DL	98	Jamion Franklin	Fr
DL	99	Jerry Tillery	Sr

Special teams

Pos.	#	Name	Class
K	19	Justin Yoon	Sr
P	30	Jake Rittman	Fr
K	39	Jonathan Doerer	So
P	42	Jeff Riney	Sr
LS	46	Matt Bushland	Sr
LS	54	John Shannon	Jr
LS	65	Michael Vinson	Fr
P	85	Tyler Newsome	GS

Head coach

- Brian Kelly

Coordinators/assistant coaches

- Mike Elston – Associate Head Coach/Defensive Line
- Chip Long – Offensive Coordinator
- Clark Lea – Defensive Coordinator
- Autry Denson – Running Backs
- Todd Lyght – Defensive Backs Coach
- Brian Polian – Recruiting Coordinator/Special Teams Coordinator
- Del Alexander – Wide Receivers
- Terry Joseph – Defensive Backs
- Jeff Quinn – Offensive Line
- Tom Rees – Quarterbacks
- Aaron Coeling – Graduate Assistant (Offense)
- Larry Black – Graduate Assistant (Defense)
- Brandon Lemon – Graduate Assistant (Offense)
- Nick Lezynski – Graduate Assistant (Defense)
- Clay Bignell – Senior Defensive Analyst
- Tyler Plantz – Special Teams Analyst
- Armon Binns – Offensive Analyst
- Chris O'Leary – Defensive Analyst
- Beth Rex – Director of Football Administration
- Joy McCausland – Senior Staff Assistant
- Julie DeBuysser – Senior Staff Assistant-Assistant Coaches
- Matt Balis – Director of Football Performance
- Jacob Flint – Co-Director Football Strength & Conditioning
- David Grimes – Assistant Strength and Conditioning Coach
- Robert Stiner – Assistant Director of Football Strength & Conditioning
- Tim Collins – Director of Football Technology
- Ryan Sehrer – Assistant Video Coordinator
- Rob Hunt – Head Football Athletic Trainer
- Mike Bean – Associate Athletic Trainer
- Steve Smith – Assistant Athletic Trainer
- Ron Powlus – Interim Associate Athletics Director - Football Operations
- Jason Michelson – Director of Football Operations
- Olivia Mitchell – Assistant Director of Football Operations
- David Peloquin – Director of Player Personnel
- Aaryn Kearney – Coordinator of Recruiting Operations
- Dr. Matt Leiszler – Team Physician
- Dr. Brian Ratigan – Orthopedic Surgeon
- Dr. Chris Balint – Orthopedic Surgeon
- Dr. Jerry Hofferth – Chiropractor
- Kari Oliver – Sports Nutrition Associate

Legend

- (C) Team captain
- (S) Suspended
- (I) Ineligible
- Injured
- Redshirt

Roster

== Rankings ==
Ranking movements Legend: ██ Increase in ranking ██ Decrease in ranking
	Week															
Poll	Pre	1	2	3	4	5	6	7	8	9	10	11	12	13	14	Final
AP	12	8	8	8	8	6	5	4	3	3	3	3	3	3	3	5
Coaches	11	8	8	8	8	7	5	4	3	3	3	3	3	3	3	5
CFP	Not released									4	3	3	3	3	3	Not released

== Game summaries ==
=== Michigan ===
Michigan at Notre Dame
(College GameDay/rivalry)

Team	1	2	3	4	Total
No. 14 Wolverines	0	10	0	7	17
• No. 12 Fighting Irish	14	7	3	0	24

- Date: September 1, 2018
- Location: Notre Dame Stadium
  Notre Dame, IN
- Game start: 7:30 p.m. EDT
- Elapsed time: 3 hours 22 minutes
- Game attendance: 77,622
- Game weather: Temperature: 83 F • Weather: Slight clouds • Wind: SSW 6 MPH
- Referee: Jeff Flanagan
- TV announcers (NBC): Mike Tirico, Doug Flutie and Kathryn Tappen (sideline)

The #12 Notre Dame Fighting Irish beat their bitter rival #14 Michigan Wolverines, 24–17 at Notre Dame Stadium, with Notre Dame's fans notably making a disturbance from the stands. Before the game, Notre Dame sold green Under Armour shirts sporting the "Irish Wear Green" slogan on front, and they were able to get their student section, fans, band, and coaching staff to wear it. Additionally, green towels with the same phrase were put on every seat in the stadium.

The Irish got off to the best start possible by scoring on each of their first two drives of the season. On their first drive of the game, it only took Irish senior quarterback Brandon Wimbush 7 plays in 1:25 to drive his offense down the field 75 yards for a touchdown. Wimbush made 15+ yard completions on consecutive passes to junior receiver Chase Claypool and senior receiver Miles Boykin, before sophomore running back Jafar Armstrong ran the ball up the middle for 13 yards and the first Notre Dame touchdown of the 2018 season. After forcing a Michigan punt, the Irish again drove down the field in 7 plays, this time covering 96 yards in 3:07. The Irish got the benefit of a couple of third down conversions–one coming from a targeting penalty called against a Michigan defender on senior tight end Alizé Mack that ejected the defender from the game, and the other resulting from a Wimbush 7-yard run. The very next play was possibly the signature play of the game, as Wimbush heaved a pass over the middle of the field all the way to the end zone, which senior receiver Chris Finke muscled away from two Michigan defenders to take control of and give the Irish a 14–0 lead, just halfway into the first quarter.

To start off the second quarter, Michigan got just 3 points off a couple of drives. Most notable from those drives were junior defensive lineman Khalid Kareem's sack of Michigan quarterback Shea Patterson for a 16-yard loss, forcing a punt, as well as senior defensive tackle Jerry Tillery's sack when Michigan was deep into the red zone, pushing it back 8 yards and forcing Michigan to settle for a field goal. On the ensuing Notre Dame drive, the Irish relied on the run game to get the ball into the end zone again, mostly by way of Wimbush and junior running back Tony Jones Jr. Notre Dame again benefited from a couple of costly Michigan penalties, both on 3rd down, which extended the drive and allowed Armstrong to get into the end zone with his second touchdown run of the game, this one a 4-yard run, to extend the Irish lead to 21–3. Michigan did return the following kickoff for a touchdown, but Notre Dame still held a substantial 21–10 lead at the half.

Michigan's started the second half already in desperation mode, as it turned over on downs each of its first two drives (one of which resulted from a botched hold on a field goal attempt by Michigan's Will Hart). Wimbush did throw a long interception in that span, but then he made perhaps one of the best plays of the game when he ran up the middle for 22 yards to keep the chains moving on 3rd and 18. Wimbush also completed a 19-yard pass to Chase Claypool, who tapped his feet in bounds to earn the first down. Wimbush appeared to have completed a 26-yard touchdown pass to Boykin later in the drive, but it was called back due to a Notre Dame penalty, meaning that the Irish would need to settle for a 48-yard field goal by senior kicker Justin Yoon. Junior defensive end Julian Okwara then intercepted a Shea Patterson pass in Irish territory, thwarting another Michigan drive.

The Irish did not do much offensively in the fourth quarter, but the Wolverines again turned the ball over on downs to return possession to Notre Dame. The Michigan offense did conjure up a fairly impressive 80-yard touchdown drive in less than 3:00 to put some pressure on the Irish, and the Wolverines indeed had the ball with 1:48 remaining in regulation in a one-possession game, but Tillery sacked Patterson and forced a fumble that senior linebacker Te'von Coney picked up to effectively end the game in a 24–17 Irish win.

=== Ball State ===
Ball State at Notre Dame

Team	1	2	3	4	Total
Cardinals	3	3	0	10	16
• No. 8 Fighting Irish	7	7	10	0	24

- Date: September 8, 2018
- Location: Notre Dame Stadium
  Notre Dame, IN
- Game start: 3:30 p.m. EDT
- Elapsed time: 3 hours 24 minutes
- Game attendance: 77,622
- Game weather: Temperature: 66 F • Weather: Cloudy • Wind: NE 10 MPH
- Referee: Gary Patterson
- TV announcers (NBC): Mike Tirico, Doug Flutie and Kathryn Tappen (sideline)

After their win over the Michigan Wolverines, the Fighting Irish moved up to No. 8 in the AP poll and took on an in-state foe, the Ball State Cardinals out of the MAC, in the first-ever matchup between the teams.

The game started off in exactly the manner that most expected–with Notre Dame scoring just 1:52 into the game. After a solid kick return by freshman C'Bo Flemister on his first collegiate touch, senior quarterback Brandon Wimbush unleashed a 27-yard completion to senior receiver Chris Finke on the game's first play from scrimmage, which was then followed up by a 42-yard scamper by sophomore running back Jafar Armstrong to set up the Irish with 1st and Goal on the Ball State 5 yard line. The Irish continued using Armstrong until he finally ran into the end zone on 3rd and Goal from the 1 (with the handoff, interestingly enough, coming from "1B" senior quarterback Ian Book, who also handed off for two rushing touchdowns against Michigan the prior week), giving the Irish an early 7–0 lead. Then, the Cardinals pushed through a 19-play, 85-yard drive that took almost 7 minutes and culminated in a field goal by Morgan Hagee, cutting Notre Dame's lead to 7–3, which would hold up until the end of the 1st quarter.

After two consecutive punts for each team, the Irish offense found some rhythm again going into the second quarter, as Armstrong ran for an 11-yard first down on the first play of the ensuing drive and Wimbush orchestrated lengthy completions to sophomore tight end Cole Kmet and junior receiver Chase Claypool to get the Irish into prime field goal range. On the Ball State 16, however, Wimbush suffered a 10-yard sack, prompting a field goal attempt by senior kicker Justin Yoon, which was pushed wide right. Thus, a promising Notre Dame drive resulted in no points. After a Ball State punt, Wimbush rattled off a few other solid passes to Armstrong and Claypool (including 23- and 27-yard completions to Armstrong), although the Irish found themselves in 4th and 8 on the Ball State 26, as they were when Yoon missed the field goal the previous drive. In a decision tough to wrap one's head around, Notre Dame decided to go for it but Wimbush's pass to Claypool was just a bit off target, so yet another Irish drive stalled near the red zone. After the Cardinals took over on downs, though, it did not take long for the Irish to get the ball back, as junior safety Jalen Elliott picked off a tipped pass by Ball State quarterback Riley Neal, and on the very next play, junior running back Tony Jones Jr. rushed into the end zone from 31 yards out to extend the Irish lead to 14–3. Ball State then punted the football back to Notre Dame again, but Wimbush returned possession to the Cardinals with his first of three interceptions on the day, this one to Josh Miller. Wimbush was heavily pressured on this play and took a questionable hit that led to the interception, prompting both junior left tackle Liam Eichenberg and Wimbush to scuffle with a couple of the Ball State defensive linemen. Ball State only turned this gift into a field goal, though, and the Irish would punt again before the teams hurried to the locker rooms, with Notre Dame up 14–6.

The third quarter began with some traction on Ball State's opening second-half drive before Neal threw his second interception of the game to Elliott, who returned his pick to almost midfield, starting the Irish drive with solid field position. Said drive then featured a substantial 9-yard run by Wimbush followed up by him firing completions to Finke and senior receiver Miles Boykin, which set up Jones Jr. for his second touchdown run of the game, this one a 1-yard walk-in. This extended Notre Dame's lead to 21–6 early in the third quarter. For the remainder of the game, the Irish defense really made its presence felt as Wimbush and the offense struggled mightily, as Ball State was forced to give up possession on its next 3 drives, and Wimbush's second interception of the game, which came off a tipped ball behind his intended receiver that caromed into the hands of Antonio Phillips. The Irish also had to punt later in the third quarter but followed it up with a nice 8-play, 33-yard drive that featured senior tight end Alizé Mack as well as Boykin helping Wimbush out by providing some nice catches, when his throwing was inconsistent and spotty at best. Yoon then got back to his converting ways by kicking it through the uprights from 46 yards out, extending the Irish lead to its most at any point in the game at 24–6.

Although Notre Dame's defense seemed to be handing Ball State opportunities with its inconsistency, it was not until early in the 4th quarter when the Cardinals finally capped off a 13-play, 79-yard drive with a Riley Neal 10-yard touchdown pass to Nolan Givan, putting Ball State within two scores of the Irish at a 24–13 deficit. The Irish seemed to potentially be getting something going again offensively, but then Wimbush threw his third interception of the game, this one to Ray Wilborn in Ball State territory, giving Ball State a legitimate chance to put substantial pressure on Notre Dame. Such pressure would not come on this drive, though, as the Cardinals ended a 13-play, 41-yard drive that took almost 4 minutes off the clock with a missed 46-yard field goal by Hagee, giving it right back to the Irish. Notre Dame had every opportunity to put this game away throughout but a 3-and-out on its next drive kept Ball State in it, especially when Hagee converted on a 49-yard field goal to bring Ball State to within one possession at 24–16. Fifth-year captain linebacker Drue Tranquill recovered the Cardinals' onside kick attempt, and even though Ball State still had 2 timeouts at its disposal to begin the drive, Wimbush ran for a 5-yard first down that effectively ended the game, with the result being an ugly 24–16 Irish win, in a game that most expected Notre Dame to blow out and put in a good number of its backups and especially freshmen.

=== Vanderbilt ===
Vanderbilt at Notre Dame

Team	1	2	3	4	Total
Commodores	0	3	7	7	17
• No. 8 Fighting Irish	10	6	0	6	22

- Date: September 15, 2018
- Location: Notre Dame Stadium
  Notre Dame, IN
- Game start: 2:30 p.m. EDT
- Elapsed time: 3 hours 20 minutes
- Game attendance: 77,622
- Game weather: Temperature: 81 F • Weather: Sunny • Wind: NE 8 MPH
- Referee: Tra Blake
- TV announcers (NBC): Mike Tirico, Doug Flutie and Kathryn Tappen (sideline)

After Notre Dame's close win over Ball State, the Vanderbilt Commodores came to Notre Dame Stadium for the third home game for the Irish in as many weeks. In a game that many fans were hoping would be a bounce-back game for the Irish as a 13.5 point favorite, Vanderbilt held its own and had legitimate opportunities to win one at Notre Dame, although Notre Dame would hang on for a 22–17 victory in conditions of extreme heat and sun.

Yet again, the Irish got off to a red hot start, as their first five plays of the game consisted of junior running back Tony Jones Jr. running for 41 yards and senior quarterback Brandon Wimbush rushing for 9 yards and completing a 17-yard pass to junior receiver Chase Claypool. Notre Dame would get all the way down to the 2-yard line, but Vanderbilt's defense stood tall and the Irish also suffered a false start penalty, prompting senior kicker Justin Yoon to put the ball through the uprights to give the Irish a 3–0 lead. The Commodores' first drive of the game was looking promising, but a key tackle by fifth-year captain linebacker Drue Tranquill forced the drive to stall and Vanderbilt to punt the ball to the Irish. Jones Jr. then got the ensuing Notre Dame drive off on the right foot by scurrying around the left side for a first down and then rushing for 2 more yards on the next play, sophomore running back Jafar Armstrong rushed for 16 yards on 3 carries, and the Irish passing game got going, with Jones Jr. gaining 24 yards on a catch-and-run along the right sideline, which all resulted in a 15 play, 94 yard, 5:21 drive that culminated in Wimbush's first rushing touchdown of the season, from 12 yards out and finishing with a dive into the end zone, allowing the Irish to take a 10–0 lead and keep the Irish faithful fired up. Not much would get going offensively for either team on the next five drives combined, all of which resulting in punts.

Midway through the second quarter, though, Jones Jr. rushed for 30 more yards on 2 carries and Notre Dame reaped the benefit of a 15-yard penalty against Vanderbilt, but the drive again stalled and Justin Yoon tacked on a 33-yard field goal to put the Irish up 13–0. The next drive would provide the crucial play of the game. Ke'Shawn Vaughn would start off the drive with a nice run and Vanderbilt's passing game really got going on this drive, led by NFL prospect Kyle Shurmur's connections with Kalija Lipscomb. Shurmur then completed a pass to Donaven Tennyson for 20 yards, but junior safety Alohi Gilman stripped the ball out of Tennyson's hands. It was a mad scrum to get on top of the football and the Commodores had a couple of chances to turn this miscue into a touchdown, but eventually junior cornerback Julian Love fell on the football in the end zone for a touchback, bringing the ball out to the 20 yard line and giving possession to Notre Dame. The Irish could only turn this gift into another field goal, as Wimbush rushed for 17 more yards and 3 more carries and also benefited from a roughing the passer penalty on the Commodores, but again the Irish could not turn this promising drive into six points as Yoon hit his third field goal of the game, this one from 46 yards out, to give Notre Dame a 16–0 lead. The Commodores then marched down the field by way of just 8 plays on 72 yards and 1:15, and Tennyson dropping a pass on the doorstep of the end zone proved costly, as Vanderbilt would settle for a Ryley Guay 21-yard field goal, taking the teams into the halftime locker rooms with the Irish leading 16–3.

Shurmur then led the Commodores with his explosive passing game to another lengthy drive to start the third quarter, but it resulted in no points, as Guay missed a 43-yard field goal. The Irish would then punt the football away each of their next 2 drives, which was sandwiched between an interception in the end zone by junior cornerback Troy Pride to thwart another solid Vanderbilt drive, but Pride took the ball out of the end zone and was tackled at the Notre Dame 1, rather than taking the touchback. Towards the end of the third quarter, the Commodores would finish off a short drive after having the ball past midfield, as Vaughn would waltz into the end zone for a 3-yard score, sending the game into the fourth quarter as a 16–10 contest.

The Irish came out firing to start the fourth quarter, as Wimbush completed passes to senior receivers Miles Boykin and Chris Finke and tight end Alizé Mack, as well as what was probably his best throw of the day on a fly route that ended up in the hands of Jones Jr. for a 32-yard gain. On 3rd and 3 on the Vanderbilt 5, junior backup quarterback Ian Book came into the game to deliver a strike to fifth year tight end Nic Weishar, which was ruled short of the line to gain, but Wimbush then took the quarterback dive to give the Irish a fresh set of downs on the 2-yard line. Book then replaced Wimbush again, and Book threw a touchdown pass that Weishar hauled in, putting the Irish up 22–10 after the failed two-point conversion attempt. The Commodores would then rattle off an efficient 9-play, 75-yard drive in just 3:42 that resulted in Shurmur connecting with Jared Pinkney, who pushed his way into the end zone to put Vanderbilt within one possession again at 22–17. Sophomore receiver Michael Young Jr. bursted out for a 48-yard kickoff return to the Notre Dame 49, but the drive would consist solely of runs by Wimbush and Jones Jr., and Yoon would uncharacteristically miss a 32-yard field goal to give the Commodores a chance to drive the length of the field to win the game. Vanderbilt was looking like it might indeed pull off the upset, especially after getting the benefit of a pass interference penalty against the Irish defense on 4th and 10, allowing the Commodores a fresh set of downs. This drive would stall, however, as junior safety Jalen Elliott made an incredible play by taking the ball away from Lipscomb on 4th and 4 on the Notre Dame 31, forcing a turnover on downs that went right back to the Irish. Notre Dame would simply run out the clock on this drive, and a 63-yard mammoth of a punt by fifth year punter and captain Tyler Newsome, who received the game ball after the game from Coach Kelly for his amazing game, essentially sealed the deal and put this one in the books as the Irish barely eked out a home win against an underrated Vanderbilt squad.

=== Wake Forest ===
Notre Dame at Wake Forest

Team	1	2	3	4	Total
• No. 8 Fighting Irish	7	21	21	7	56
Demon Deacons	3	10	7	7	27

- Date: September 22, 2018
- Location: BB&T Field
  Winston Salem, NC
- Game start: 12:00 p.m. EDT
- Elapsed time: 3 hours 23 minutes
- Game attendance: 31,092
- Game weather: Temperature: 83 F • Weather: Sunny, clear • Wind: ENE 1 MPH
- Referee: Duane Heydt
- TV announcers (ABC): Sean McDonough, Todd Blackledge and Holly Rowe (sideline)

Even though the Irish started off the season 3–0 under the direction of senior quarterback Brandon Wimbush, Notre Dame head coach Brian Kelly made a bold move by turning to junior quarterback Ian Book for the start against Wake Forest, and his decision did not disappoint. Book rushed for 43 yards and threw for 325 yards, more passing yards in a single game than Wimbush could ever boast, and the entire Irish offense had a monstrous performance, blowing out the Wake Forest Demon Deacons 56–27 in Notre Dame's first road game of the season.

Although the game was not in doubt for nearly all of the second half, this contest began fairly rocky for the Irish. Both teams punted on their first possessions of the game, and after having a short field to work with on its second drive, Notre Dame stalled and eventually turned the ball over on downs, as it was unable to convert a 4th and 8 on the Wake Forest 33, just one of many questionable calls by Kelly this season to go for it in such a position. The woes continued for the Irish as the Demon Deacons drove down the field, but ultimately they came up empty-handed as kicker Nick Sciba failed to realize that he was supposed to be on the field for his field goal attempt before missing it to preserve the scoreless tie. It seemed to get worse for Notre Dame as sophomore receiver Michael Young Jr. was hit and lost the football after catching a screen pass, giving Wake Forest another prime scoring opportunity in the red zone. The Demon Deacons would only gain one yard on their drive, however, and Sciba eventually got into formation on time and kicked it through the uprights from 30 yards out for an early 3–0 lead. Sciba's field goal was significant because it marked the first time that Notre Dame had trailed this entire season in Week 4, but the Irish would not trail for long. Such would be the case because "The Book Club" got going, as Book rattled off 3 consecutive strikes to senior tight end Alizé Mack, for gains of 8, 9, and 24 yards, respectively, and sophomore running back Jafar Armstrong topped the drive off by hurrying to the right side of the field en route to a 30-yard touchdown run, putting the Irish up 7–3, in a lead that would only grow.

On the first play of the second quarter, Sciba converted a 39-yard field goal, his second of the day, to make it a 7–6 game. Such points resulted from another solid Wake Forest drive, but the Demon Deacons defense had no idea what they had coming to them in the form of this potent Notre Dame offense. Book hit 5 different receivers on the ensuing Irish drive, and Armstrong and fellow sophomore running back Avery Davis contributed sizable runs, leading to a touchdown pass from Book to sophomore tight end Brock Wright, the first touchdown reception of his career, to extend the Irish lead to 14–6. Wake Forest simply would not have an answer for the Notre Dame defense on its next drive, as true freshman quarterback Sam Hartman would be sacked by fifth-year senior and captain Drue Tranquill, giving the Irish the ball back. Notre Dame was fueled by a rare 52-yard punt return by senior receiver Chris Finke, giving the Irish the ball on the Wake 4-yard line. On 2nd and Goal from that spot, junior running back Tony Jones Jr. ran the ball up the gut, putting the Irish up 21–6. The Demon Deacons showed some more bright spots on its next possession that totaled 10 plays and 75 yards in just 2:53, ending with a Matt Colburn touchdown run, which moved the game back to within one possession. When the Irish got the ball back, they were fueled again by a big play, this time by Young Jr. bursting away from defenders for a 66-yard gain off a screen pass, and Book followed up his throw to Young Jr. by running it into the end zone himself for a 2-yard touchdown run, cementing the Irish lead at 28–13 going into halftime.

While Notre Dame's defense and team as a whole showed a tendency in their first three games of the season to let down a bit in the second half, no such downfall was seen today. The Demon Deacons would get the ball to start the second half but would punt shortly thereafter, overwhelmed by junior defensive end Julian Okwara's 8-yard sack of Hartman on 3rd and 11 from Wake's 33. The next Notre Dame drive would begin with Davis rattling off a 12-yard run to move the chains, and it would be continued by Book's 30-yard pass to Jones Jr. to put the Irish on the Wake 8, leading to Book finding junior receiver Chase Claypool on a 7-yard touchdown pass, running up the score to 35–13. The Irish would then force a Wake punt and receive the benefit of a 15-yard penalty against the Demon Deacons. On this drive, though, the running game would prove to be the key for the Irish, as Armstrong sprinted into the red zone by way of a 28-yard run and Book added a slick 11-yard waltz to the Wake 3, at which point Armstrong and Notre Dame's offensive line pushed forward for yet another Irish touchdown and a commanding 42–13 lead. As if things couldn't get any worse for the Demon Deacons, Hartman would be picked off on the very next play from scrimmage by Notre Dame junior cornerback Troy Pride, his second interception in as many weeks, giving the Irish a short field with the ball on the Wake 47. Book caught even more fire by delivering a 35-yard dime to Claypool, setting up Notre Dame in the red zone again, and after another Davis run and ensuing penalty against the Demon Deacons, Book would run it in from 2 yards out again to put the Irish up 49–13. Wake Forest would respond with a 9-play, 75-yard touchdown drive in 3:34 of game clock, although it struggled all day to get its star receiver Greg Dortch going, thanks to Notre Dame's defensive scheme under first-year coordinator Clark Lea.

The Irish would not let up at all to begin the fourth quarter, as Book threw strikes to Kevin Austin Jr. on consecutive gains of 6 and 29 yards, respectively, setting up Notre Dame on the doorstep of the red zone yet again. Book then connected with Finke for 12 yards to put the ball at the Wake 1, and on the very next play, Book would waltz in to the end zone again for his third rushing touchdown of the afternoon, giving the Irish a 56–20 lead. Notre Dame did not have many answers for Wake Forest quarterback Jamie Newman and his designed quarterback runs late, as he led the Demon Deacons with ease through a 13-play, 79-yard touchdown drive that chewed up 6:34 of game clock, but it would not matter. The Irish would use the blowout to their advantage in the form of allotting playing time to some of their freshmen, including running back Jahmir Smith and quarterback Phil Jurkovec, and Notre Dame would be marching onward to victory again and to a 4–0 start, leaving Winston-Salem with smiles on their faces after their 56–27 trouncing of the Wake Forest Demon Deacons.

=== Stanford ===
Stanford at Notre Dame
(Legends Trophy)

Team	1	2	3	4	Total
No. 7 Cardinal	7	7	3	0	17
• No. 8 Fighting Irish	14	7	3	14	38

- Date: September 29, 2018
- Location: Notre Dame Stadium
  Notre Dame, IN
- Game start: 7:30 p.m. EDT
- Elapsed time: 3 hours 21 minutes
- Game attendance: 77,622
- Game weather: Temperature: 57 F • Weather: Overcast • Wind: N 16 MPH
- Referee: Chris Coyte
- TV announcers (NBC): Mike Tirico, Doug Flutie and Kathryn Tappen (sideline)

Junior quarterback Ian Book made his second consecutive start for the Irish and played another sensational game, Dexter Williams rushed for 161 yards including a 45-yard touchdown run in his season debut, and Notre Dame's defense limited the Stanford offense to just 10 total first downs, as the No. 8 Fighting Irish took down the #7 Cardinal 38–17, in a cool, fall, primetime atmosphere and the first top 10 matchup at Notre Dame Stadium since 2005.

The Notre Dame defense took the field first to start off this contest for a change, and it limited the Stanford offense to no yards on a 3-and-out. On Notre Dame's first offensive drive of the game, Book hit senior receiver Miles Boykin on an extremely impressive 11-yard throw for a first down, but the Irish ended up turning the ball over on downs after junior running back Tony Jones Jr. ran on four consecutive plays but could not convert on 4th and 1 near midfield. The Cardinal would not do anything on its next drive, though, and would punt it back to the Irish. Notre Dame would score on this drive, as Book connected with Boykin for a nice 19-yard completion and Jones Jr. manufactured a few runs, with senior running back Dexter Williams capping off the drive with a 45-yard touchdown run in his very first carry of the season. Stanford would then match Notre Dame's touchdown drive with one of its own, as Cardinal running back Bryce Love broke a few tackles to run 39 yards for a touchdown, tying the game at 7 apiece. The Irish would then put together another impressive drive, ultimately resulting in another touchdown. Williams ran for an 18-yard first down early in the drive, but the signature plays of this drive were Book's passes to tight ends Cole Kmet and Nic Weishar, respectively; the former for a 19-yard completion on 4th down, and the latter for a 6-yard touchdown pass on 3rd and 2. The first quarter would end with the Irish having a 14–7 lead.

The Cardinal began the second quarter with an 84-yard touchdown drive to knot the game at 14–14, with the culmination of its drive coming on quarterback K.J. Costello's 4-yard touchdown pass to receiver J. J. Arcega-Whiteside, who made a nice play in rather contested coverage in the end zone. The next four drives would all result in punts, the only notable plays from the Irish perspective being three consecutive runs totaling 18 yards, as well as Book running for 10 yards and a first down. After Stanford's second consecutive punt, however, Notre Dame conjured up its signature drive of the game. Not only did Book hit Boykin on three consecutive completions of 10, 9, and 33 yards, respectively, but he more impressively got outside of the pocket, escaped a sack, and fired a 10-yard touchdown pass right on the money to junior receiver Chase Claypool as he rolled out to his left. Stanford would then end the first half after a woeful effort at best to get something going in the final 39 seconds, going into the locker rooms with Notre Dame holding a 21–14 lead.

Both teams started relatively static in the second half, each gaining 1 yard and going 3-and-out on their respective first drives of the third quarter. Notre Dame employed a little bit of everything–explosive runs by Williams and Jones Jr., Book completing a pass to senior receiver Chris Finke for a 16-yard first down, and Book escaping the pocket and running a couple of times himself–on its drive that resulted in a 37-yard field goal by senior kicker Justin Yoon. Stanford would punt on its next drive, as would Notre Dame, keeping the lead at 24–14 for the Irish. Stanford would convert on a field goal of its own by kicker Jet Toner, from 46 yards out, which was the best that the Cardinal could do after junior defensive end Khalid Kareem unleashed his will on Costello, sacking him for a loss of 6 yards. The Irish responded with a promising drive of their own, highlighted by a solid Book pass to Boykin for 20 yards and a first down as well as a Williams run of 17 yards that also moved the chains, but Notre Dame would come up empty-handed on this drive, suffering some costly penalties that put them in a tough position, resulting in the Cardinal special teams unit tipping Yoon's 50-yard field goal attempt and causing it to wind up no good.

In the fourth quarter, where the Cardinal has thrived against the Irish in its three consecutive wins in this historic rivalry, Stanford did exactly the opposite. In fact, it managed a mind-boggling −23 yards on its final three drives combined, as its offensive line had absolutely no answers for the relentless Irish front seven. In the midst of this defensive stranglehold that the Irish strengthened on the Cardinal in the fourth quarter, Notre Dame's offense also soared and built up a lead that would put the game out of reach. Notre Dame's fourth touchdown drive of the game was impressive on every front, most notably because of Book's pinpoint accuracy and escapability as a passer. Especially important was when Book completed a 10-yard pass to Boykin on the right sideline for a first down on 3rd and 9, and he also kept the drive going with passes to Finke and Claypool of 14 and 7 yards, respectively. The drive finished with Book throwing a screen pass to Boykin, who proceeded to run it 8 yards into the end zone for a score, putting the Irish up 31–17. On the very next play from scrimmage, Costello was picked off by senior linebacker Te'von Coney, as Costello became so flustered by the pressure that the Irish continued to apply up front, allowing Coney to record his first career interception. When Book lined up under center at the Stanford 35, he proceeded to easily senior tight end Alizé Mack, who somehow ended up as wide open as could be, and he marched into the end zone, extending the Irish lead to 38–17. To put the icing on the cake in Notre Dame's first win over a Top 10 opponent since 2012, senior defensive tackle Jerry Tillery recorded his third and fourth sacks of the game on consecutive plays on Stanford's final offensive drive of the night, resulting in losses of 10 and 8 yards, respectively, and the Irish were able to get true freshman running back Jahmir Smith into the game against the #7 team in the country, as the Irish team was able to face the student section while swaying and signing the alma mater in a feeling of jubilant victory, demolishing the Cardinal 38–17.

=== Virginia Tech ===
Notre Dame at Virginia Tech

Team	1	2	3	4	Total
• No. 6 Fighting Irish	10	7	14	14	45
No. 24 Hokies	3	13	0	7	23

- Date: October 6, 2018
- Location: Lane Stadium
  Blacksburg, VA
- Game start: 8:00 p.m. EDT
- Elapsed time: 3 hours 18 minutes
- Game attendance: 65,632
- Game weather: Temperature: 71 F • Weather: partly cloudy, humid • Wind: SSE 2–8 MPH
- Referee: Stuart Mullins
- TV announcers (ABC): Chris Fowler, Kirk Herbstreit, and Maria Taylor (sideline)

The #6 Irish hit a bit of lull in the first half, but they turned it on in the second half, fueled by Dexter Williams' 97-yard touchdown run, and went on to demolish the #24 Virginia Tech Hokies 45–23 on the road, in one of the loudest primetime atmospheres in all of college football at Lane Stadium.

The Irish kept the trend going of starting fast by embarking on a 12-play, 78-yard touchdown drive, gobbling up the first 5:36 of the game. Junior quarterback Ian Book put his spectacular passing skills on display again on this night and especially throughout this first drive, putting the pigskin right on the money to senior receiver Miles Boykin and junior receiver Chase Claypool, as well as senior tight end Alizé Mack, setting up Dexter Williams for an easy 1-yard touchdown run the play after Book himself lunged forward for a first down on 4th and 1 at the Virginia Tech 2. The Hokies would go 3-and-out on their first offensive drive of the game, punting the ball back to the Irish. Book came back right where he left off on the first drive, launching the ball downfield to senior receiver Chris Finke for a 59-yard gain. Notre Dame would stall, however, and settle for a 31-yard field goal by senior kicker Justin Yoon, making it 10–0 Irish. Yoon would become Notre Dame's all-time leading scorer by converting an extra point later in the game, etching his name into the Fighting Irish history books. The next drive would prove to be crucial for the momentum of the game as a whole. Virginia Tech had something good going and then appeared to have completed a 49-yard touchdown pass play, but it was called back due to an ineligible man downfield on a Hokie offensive lineman. This took much of the life out of Lane Stadium, meaning that Virginia Tech would rely on kicker Brian Johnson to bury one through the uprights from 39 yards out, making it a one-possession game again at 10–3 Irish, which would continue into the second quarter.

Notre Dame started off the second quarter with a promising drive, highlighted by a 13-yard run by senior running back Dexter Williams and a solid 15-yard pass connection from Book to Boykin, although the Irish would be forced to punt at midfield. This is when all hell broke loose for a second–junior long snapper John Shannon bounced the ball to fifth-year captain and punter Tyler Newsome, who appeared baffled by the disarray, being taken down by some Hokie coverage men near midfield, setting up Virginia Tech with prime field position. The Hokies would not get much on their ensuing drive, however, as junior defensive ends Julian Okwara and Khalid Kareem took Hokie freshman quarterback Ryan Willis down for an 11-yard sack, forcing Virginia Tech to settle for another Brian Johnson field goal, this one from 43 yards out. Book completed some nice passes to Claypool and sophomore tight end Cole Kmet on the next drive, but eventually the Irish would punt again. Virginia Tech would punt quickly on its next drive too, but would get the ball right back on the plus-side of the field by Reggie Floyd intercepting an Ian Book pass. The Hokies seemed to be in perfect position to take the lead, but Virginia Tech running back Steven Peoples was stopped just short of the goal line at the 1 yard line after a speedy 41-yard run, and then the Hokies could not get the ball in the end zone from there, even showing signs of panicking as Willis ran into Peoples on their 3rd down play. Thus, Johnson would kick a 22-yard field goal to make it 10–9 Irish. Notre Dame was not very impressive on its next drive and would punt, but suddenly the luck of the Irish seemed to take over this game. Kareem almost got to Willis on his initial rush, but after being brought down to the ground, he got back up and stripped the ball from Willis, allowing junior cornerback Julian Love to pick it up and take it to the house for a 42-yard scoop 'n score. The Hokies looked strong offensively on their next drive, with Willis completing a 3-yard touchdown pass to Damon Hazelton, making it a one-point contest at 17–16 going into the half.

The second half was a completely different story. The Hokies eventually punted to open up the second half and pinned the Irish down at their own 5. This would not matter, though, as Williams showed his second-level speed by running through the hole and bursting all the way to the end zone for a 97-yard touchdown run, putting the Irish up 24–16. Virginia Tech had an offensive response on its next drive, but said drive ended up producing no points as Johnson missed a 47-yard field goal. Notre Dame's offense then slowly chipped away at this Hokie defense on its next drive by employing many short passes, with the exception being Book's completion to Finke for 10 yards and a first down. Later in the drive, Book found Boykin all alone for an easy pass down the left sideline, which he easily ran to the house, totaling 40-yard touchdown play and a 31–16 Notre Dame lead.

It would get even worse for the Hokies. After both teams traded punts, Virginia Tech got some momentum going offensive but then Johnson missed his second field goal of the night, this one from 52 yards out. Notre Dame took over by officially putting this game away, as Book had a couple of nice completions to Boykin before firing to him for a 5-yard touchdown pass, causing many in the Virginia Tech faithful to head for the exits at Lane Stadium, as the game became out of hand at 38–16 Irish. The Hokies would respond with a touchdown drive of their own, capped off by Willis' pass to Eric Kumah from 15 yards out, but the Irish would not let up at all, showing the focus and tenacity to put this Virginia Tech team away, as Coach Kelly had been preaching all season long, recovering the onside kick and then giving it to Williams, who covered 13 yards on his first run and then 31 yards on his second run of the drive, catapulting Notre Dame to the end zone and a 45–23 lead. Just for good measure, Love picked off Willis with less than four minutes remaining to seal the deal, getting true freshman running back C'Bo Flemister and former starting quarterback senior Brandon Wimbush into the game for a bit, as the Irish picked up a huge win against a ranked opponent in a primetime road atmosphere, improving to 6–0 and a #5 AP rank on the season.

=== Pittsburgh ===
Pittsburgh at Notre Dame
(rivalry)

Team	1	2	3	4	Total
Panthers	7	0	7	0	14
• No. 5 Fighting Irish	0	6	6	7	19

- Date: October 13, 2018
- Location: Notre Dame Stadium
  Notre Dame, IN
- Game start: 2:30 p.m. EDT
- Elapsed time: 3 hours 5 minutes
- Game attendance: 77,622
- Game weather: Temperature: 49 F • Weather: Sunny • Wind: SW 9 MPH
- Referee: Gary Patterson
- TV announcers (NBC): Mike Tirico, Doug Flutie and Kathryn Tappen (sideline)

The Pittsburgh Panthers were considered the ultimate opponent. Though trailing for most of the game, the #5 Notre Dame Fighting Irish ultimately pulled out a close 19–14 victory to send Notre Dame students off.

The Irish started off the first quarter against Pitt with a tough drive to swallow, as though junior quarterback Ian Book completed short-mid length passes to senior tight end Alizé Mack and senior receiver Chris Finke, Book also took a devastating 16-yard sack, forcing Notre Dame to punt on its first possession. Pitt's first drive would prove to be essentially all of the offense that it would get on the day, as the Panthers embarked on a 17-play, 88-yard drive that spanned 9:43 and resulted in a Qadree Ollison 9-yard touchdown run. When the Irish took over on their next drive, Book scrambled for a remarkable 22-yard first down on 3rd and 5, but he threw an interception to Jason Pinnock on a bad decision on the very next play, ending the first quarter with Pitt holding a 7–0 lead.

Pitt would not do anything with this interception, punting the ball back to the Irish. Book made a nice completion to sophomore tight end Cole Kmet on Notre Dame's drive, but this drive would also result in a punt. Pitt would end up being even less effective than the Irish on its next drive, punting the ball away again. At this point the Irish offense would start to show some life, and they also benefitted from starting their ensuing drive on the Pitt 49. Specifically, junior running back Tony Jones Jr. got going early in the drive, and then the Irish would earn 15 yards on a roughing the passer penalty against the Panthers, setting up the Irish just outside of the red zone. Book completed nice passes to Finke and Mack again, but the Irish drive eventually stalled, resulting in senior kicker Justin Yoon making a 22-yard field goal to close the deficit to 7–3. Pitt again would have next to nothing offensively, giving the ball back to the Irish with just over 3:30 remaining in the first half. On this final drive of the half, Book really got it going with his arm, as he completed passes of 13 and 30 yards, respectively, to true freshman receiver Kevin Austin Jr. and senior receiver Miles Boykin, as well as a couple of other short passes to 3 other receivers, but he would end up taking 2 sacks that stifled the drive and forced another field goal from Yoon, this one from 41 yards out, making it a 7–6 game at halftime.

Notre Dame was hoping to start off the second half strong, but what happened was the exact opposite–Maurice Ffrench took the opening kickoff 99 yards to the house, extending Pitt's lead to 14–6. Once Book got the ball back, though, he seemed to be in true form again in all respects, as he started off the drive with an impressive 15-yard run and then followed it up with more passes right on the money to his usual targets, most notably to junior receiver Chase Claypool on an 8-yard completion, that would have been taken all the way to the end zone if not for a shoestring tackle by a Pitt defender. Senior running back Dexter Williams also got into the act a bit with some short runs, but ultimately what looked to be a drive that would result in a touchdown ended in Book being hit as he threw, leading to his second interception of the game, this one caught by Jazzee Stocker near the goal line, as Notre Dame was almost into the red zone at that point in the drive. Pitt moved the ball considerably well after this interception, but ultimately its drive stalled and they needed Alex Kessman to make a 47-yard field goal, which he was not able to do. Picking up where he left off, Book made some magical throws again, starting off the drive with a solid 21-yard completion to Claypool. Then, after a 10-yard holding penalty on senior left guard Trevor Ruhland, filling in for injured fifth-year captain Alex Bars, Book wasted no time getting all of these lost yards by firing a dime to Finke for 26 yards and a first down. Book later kept the drive alive on 3rd and 6 by finding Finke over the middle for 15 yards, and on the very next play, he completed a 16-yard strike to Claypool for the first Irish touchdown of the day, cutting Pitt's lead to 14–12. Notre Dame decided to try to tie the game then and there by going for two, but Book's pass to Boykin in the end zone was just out of reach, keeping the score exactly where it was. The Irish would trail going into the fourth quarter for the first time this season.

Pitt started off the fourth quarter by getting a nice drive going and even getting into the red zone, but that drive again resulted in no points as Kessman missed his second field goal of the game, this one from 36 yards out, to keep the Irish within a field goal. The next Irish drive was not promising, though, so they had to give the ball back to the Panthers, still trailing by 2. Pitt had yet another opportunity to make it much tougher for the Irish in the fourth quarter, but it could not do it and had to punt yet again. When Notre Dame got the ball back, it wasted no time in taking the lead for good. The Irish started out with an automatic first down after a pass interference call on a Pitt defender who was covering Claypool, and the Irish offense caught fire at this point. Williams rattled off an explosive 13-yard run, and then Book found Boykin on two consecutive plays–the first being a pivotal 12-yard completion with Boykin making a solid catch near the sidelines for a first down on 3rd and 5, and the second being what very well may have been the best throw that Book has made thus far in his Notre Dame career, as one could not have placed it in Boykin's hands in a better spot than Book threw it to him for a 35-yard touchdown reception and a 19–14 Irish lead. When Pitt got the ball back, its offense continued to perform so woefully that the Panthers needed to rely on some trickery via a fake punt, but it looked like one of the intended targets fell down during the play and, at any rate, the pass by Jeff George was incomplete and Notre Dame would take over on downs near midfield. The Irish would not fare much better on their ensuing offensive possession, though, as their attempts to run out the clock to a victory would not work, forcing a 4th and 1 that Notre Dame would go for, but Book's roll out did not work, giving the ball back to the Panthers with a chance to drive downfield to win the game. If the Panthers could manufacture a semblance of an offense, then they might have had a chance to win the game, but junior defensive end Khalid Kareem sacked Pitt quarterback Kenny Pickett for a 14-yard loss, and then Pitt suffered a penalty before Pickett's intended receiver caught the ball well out of bounds on 4th and 29 from the Pitt 19, effectively ending the game, allowing the Irish to march out of Notre Dame Stadium with a 19–14 win in what ended up being a much closer game than many predicted.

=== Navy ===
Notre Dame vs Navy
(Rip Miller Trophy)

Team	1	2	3	4	Total
• No. 3 Fighting Irish	13	14	10	7	44
Midshipmen	0	0	14	8	22

- Date: October 27, 2018
- Location: SDCCU Stadium
  San Diego, CA
- Game start: 8:00 p.m. EDT
- Elapsed time: 3 hours 13 minutes
- Game attendance: 63,626
- Game weather: Temperature: 71 F • Weather: clear • Wind: W 3 MPH
- Referee: Jeff Heaser
- TV announcers (CBS): Carter Blackburn, Rick Neuheisel, Aaron Taylor and John Schriffen (sideline)

Previous meetings between the Irish and Navy have been back and forth, along with being competitive. This game had a different story line. Notre Dame would fumble the ball on the first offensive play of the game, setting Navy up at the Irish 36 yard line. Notre Dame would then stop Navy on 4th and 2, forcing a turnover on downs, and not giving up any points on the turnover. From there, the Irish would dominate the 1st half, scoring four straight touchdowns to take a commanding 27–0 lead at halftime, while forcing Navy to punt on 4 straight possessions. Navy would score 22 2nd half point, but would never get closer than 15 points. The Irish would finish with 584 yards of offense, including 28 first downs, while holding Navy to 384 yards and just 14 first downs. This is the biggest win by the Irish over Navy since 2012, when Notre Dame won 50–10. The win would push the Irish record to 8–0.

=== Northwestern ===
Notre Dame at Northwestern
(rivalry)

Team	1	2	3	4	Total
• No. 3 Fighting Irish	7	0	14	10	31
Wildcats	0	7	0	14	21

- Date: November 3, 2018
- Location: Ryan Field
  Evanston, IL
- Game start: 7:30 p.m. EDT
- Elapsed time: 3 hours 10 minutes
- Game attendance: 47,330
- Game weather: Temperature: 47 F • Weather: cloudy • Wind: E 10 MPH
- Referee: Tra Blake
- TV announcers (ESPN): Sean McDonough, Todd Blackledge and Holly Rowe (sideline)

=== Florida State ===
Florida State at Notre Dame
(rivalry)

Team	1	2	3	4	Total
Seminoles	0	6	7	0	13
• No. 3 Fighting Irish	17	15	3	7	42

- Date: November 10, 2018
- Location: Notre Dame Stadium
  Notre Dame, IN
- Game start: 7:30 p.m. EST
- Elapsed time: 3 hours 22 minutes
- Game attendance: 77,622
- Game weather: Temperature: 27 F • Weather: partly cloudy • Wind: SSE 5 MPH
- Referee: Jeff Flanagan
- TV announcers (NBC): Mike Tirico, Doug Flutie and Kathryn Tappen (sideline)

=== Syracuse ===
Notre Dame vs Syracuse
(Shamrock Series)

Team	1	2	3	4	Total
No. 12 Orange	0	0	0	3	3
• No. 3 Fighting Irish	13	7	9	7	36

- Date: November 17, 2018
- Location: Yankee Stadium
  Bronx, NY
- Game start: 2:30 p.m. EST
- Elapsed time: 3 hours 11 minutes
- Game attendance: 48,104
- Game weather: Temperature: 47 F • Weather: cloudy • Wind: W 11 MPH
- Referee: Stuart Mullins
- TV announcers (NBC): Mike Tirico, Doug Flutie and Kathryn Tappen (sideline)

=== USC ===
Notre Dame at USC
(Jeweled Shillelagh)

Team	1	2	3	4	Total
• No. 3 Fighting Irish	0	7	10	7	24
Trojans	7	3	0	7	17

- Date: November 24, 2018
- Location: Los Angeles Memorial Coliseum
  Los Angeles, CA
- Game start: 8:00 p.m. EDT
- Elapsed time: 3 hours 17 minutes
- Game attendance: 59,821
- Game weather: Temperature: 65 F • Weather: clear skies • Wind: NNW 1 MPH
- Referee: David Epperley
- TV announcers (ABC): Chris Fowler, Kirk Herbstreit and Maria Taylor

=== Clemson ===
Notre Dame vs Clemson
Cotton Bowl Classic
CFP Semifinal

Team	1	2	3	4	Total
No. 3 Fighting Irish	3	0	0	0	3
• No. 2 Tigers	3	20	7	0	30

- Date: December 29, 2018
- Location: AT&T Stadium
  Arlington, TX
- Game start: 4:00 p.m. EDT
- Elapsed time: 3 hours 31 minutes
- Game attendance: 72,183
- Game weather: Temperature: 72 F • Weather: Indoors (closed roof) • Wind: n/a
- Referee: Matt Austin (SEC)
- TV announcers (ESPN): Sean McDonough, Todd Blackledge, Holly Rowe, and Tom Rinaldi

== Postseason ==
=== Awards ===
- Wuerffel Trophy
  - Winner: Drue Tranquill
- William V. Campbell Trophy
  - Finalist: Drue Tranquill
- Jim Thorpe Award
  - Finalist: Julian Love
- Broyles Award
  - Finalist: Chip Long
- Rimington Trophy
  - Finalist: Sam Mustipher

=== Players drafted into the NFL ===
Round	Pick	Player	Position	NFL Club
1	28	Jerry Tillery	DT	Los Angeles Chargers
3	93	Miles Boykin	WR	Baltimore Ravens
4	108	Julian Love	CB	New York Giants
4	130	Drue Tranquill	LB	Los Angeles Chargers
6	194	Dexter Williams	RB	Green Bay Packers
7	231	Alizé Mack	TE	New Orleans Saints
