= Harry Hiestand =

American football coach (born 1958)

Personal information
- Born: November 19, 1958 (age 68); Malvern, Pennsylvania, U.S.

Career information
- College: Springfield College; East Stroudsburg

Career history
- East Stroudsburg (1981–1982) Student assistant; East Stroudsburg (1983–1985) Offensive line coach; Penn (1986–1987) Tight ends coach; USC (1987–1988) Graduate assistant; Toledo (1988–1989) Offensive line coach; Cincinnati (1989–1993) Offensive coordinator/offensive line coach; Missouri (1994–1996) Offensive line coach; Illinois (1997–1999) Offensive line coach; Illinois (2000–2004) Assistant head coach/offensive line coach; Chicago Bears (2005–2009) Offensive line coach; Tennessee (2010–2011) Offensive line coach; Notre Dame (2012–2017) Offensive line coach; Chicago Bears (2018–2019) Offensive line coach; Notre Dame (2022) Offensive line coach

Harry Koch Hiestand (born November 19, 1958) is an American former football coach who last was the offensive line coach for the Notre Dame Fighting Irish.

== Early life and education ==
Hiestand was born November 19, 1958, in Malvern, Pennsylvania. He attended Springfield College in Springfield, Massachusetts, and then East Stroudsburg University in East Stroudsburg, Pennsylvania, where he played college football from 1978 to 1980 alongside future New York Giants offensive line coach Pat Flaherty. In 1983, he graduated from East Stroudsburg University with a bachelor's degree in health and physical education in 1983.

== Career ==
=== Collegiate coaching ===
Hiestand began his coaching career East Stroudsburg University, his alma mater, where he coached was a student assistant coach in 1982 and 1983 and offensive line coach from 1983 to 1985. He was subsequently tight ends and assistant line coach at the University of Pennsylvania in Philadelphia in 1986, a graduate assistant coach at the University of Southern California in Los Angeles in 1987, and offensive line coach at the University of Toledo in Toledo, Ohio in 1988 and 1989. As a USC coach, he coached the Trojans in the 1988 Rose Bowl.

==== Cincinnati ====
From 1989 to 1993, he coached at the University of Cincinnati, where he served as run game coordinator in 1992 and as offensive coordinator in 1993. As offensive coordinator, running back David Small broke Cincinnati's record for rushing touchdowns, and the offense posted the seventh-most points in school history. Cincinnati's 1993 team went 8-3 after a 3-8 record the previous campaign.

==== Missouri ====
He then coached at the University of Missouri in Columbia, Missouri, where he was offensive line coach from 1994 to 1996. With Missouri, Hiestand helped the University of Missouri finish the 1996 season ninth in the nation in rushing at 250.7 yards per game. The same year, three of Hiestand's offensive lineman garnered All-Big 12 honors.

==== Illinois ====
From 1997 to 1999, Hiestand served as offensive line coach in Ron Turner's system at the University of Illinois, where he was also assistant head coach from 2000 until his departure. During his tenure at Missouri, Hiestand coached ten All-Big Ten selections on the offensive line. In 2002, Illinois marched out one of the nation's most balanced offensive attacks thanks in large part to Hiestand's offensive front. Illinois topped 5,300 yards in total offense for the first time in school history and running back Antoineo Harris broke the Illinois single season rushing record with 1,330 yards in the season. Seniors Tony Pashos and David Diehl each earned All-Big Ten accolades, and were fifth-round picks in the 2003 NFL draft.

In 2000, Marques Sullivan and Ray Redziniak earned second-team All-Big Ten honors for the second straight year and Sullivan was named to the Football Writers Association All-America third-team. That season, the line allowed only 20 sacks, the 17th lowest in the nation.

In 1999, Hiestand's line led Illinois to the highest scoring offense in school history with 388 points scored in 12 games. The Illinois offensive line cleared paths for Illini running backs to rush for 2,082 yards and provided quarterback Kurt Kittner the room to throw for 2,702 yards and 24 touchdown passes. Sullivan and Redziniak earned second-team All-Big Ten honors.

In 2001, Hiestand tutored a pair of linemen to first team All-Big Ten accolades. Both Jay Kulaga and Pashos were named to the Big Ten's first team by the coaches and media, while senior center Luke Butkus was a second-team selection. Illinois topped the 5,000-yard total offense mark for the first time in school history.

During his tenure at Illinois, Hiestand tutored 12 all-Big Ten selections on the offensive line. Every senior starting offensive lineman in Hiestand's first seven years with the Illini was signed to an NFL contract: Ryan Schau (1995–98), J. P. Machado (1995–98), Marques Sullivan (1997–2000), Ray Redziniak (1997–2000), Luke Butkus (1998–2001), Dave Diehl (1999–2002), and Tony Pashos (1999–2002).

=== Chicago Bears ===
Hiestand was hired on January 11, 2005 as offensive line coach for the Chicago Bears. The Bears were one of six teams to have the same five offensive linemen start all 16 games in 2008 (C Olin Kreutz, LG Josh Beekman, RG Roberto Garza, LT John St. Clair, and RT John Tait), marking the first time since 2001 that the Bears had the same five players start all 16 contests on their offensive line.

The offensive line would become the most experienced unit on the Bears roster over the next couple of years, led by 11-year veteran and six-time Pro Bowl C Kreutz, who entered the 2009 season having started a team-high 102 consecutive games.

In 2008, Chicago’s offense attempted 557 pass plays and absorbed 29 sacks. In 2006, the Bears attempted 539 pass plays and allowed just 25 sacks, the lowest total given up by the team since allowing 17 in 2001. The Bears went on to win the 2006 NFC Championship and the team's first Super Bowl appearance in 21 years in Super Bowl XLI.

=== Tennessee and Notre Dame ===
After spending two years coaching the offensive line at the University of Tennessee in Knoxville, Tennessee from 2010 to 2012, Hiestand was hired to the same post at the University of Notre Dame in South Bend, Indiana, under head coach Brian Kelly. Since reaching the BCS National Championship Game during his first season at Notre Dame, Hiestand developed ten current and former NFL offensive linemen, including:

- Alex Bars, Chicago Bears and Las Vegas Raiders offensive guard (graduated after 2018 season)
- Braxston Cave, former Detroit Lions center
- Mike Golic Jr., former Pittsburgh Steelers offensive guard
- Nick Martin, Houston Texans, Las Vegas Raiders, and Washington Commanders offensive guard
- Zack Martin, Dallas Cowboys offensive guard
- Mike McGlinchey, Denver Broncos and San Francisco 49ers offensive tackle
- Sam Mustipher, Baltimore Ravens and Chicago Bears center (graduated after 2018 season)
- Quenton Nelson, Indianapolis Colts offensive guard
- Ronnie Stanley, Baltimore Ravens offensive tackle
- Chris Watt, former San Diego Chargers offensive guard

=== Return to Chicago Bears ===
In January 2018, Hiestand returned to the Bears after being hired by new head coach Matt Nagy as the offensive line coach.

Under Hiestand, the 2018 Bears allowed 33 sacks, tied for the eighth-fewest in the NFL. Center Cody Whitehair and left tackle Charles Leno were named to their first Pro Bowl, the first Bears offensive linemen teammates to make the all-star game since 2006.

In 2019, however, Chicago's offensive line allowed 43 sacks, 12th-most in the NFL, and helped the offense record just 91.1 rushing yards per game (sixth worst). Hiestand was fired on December 31.

=== Return to Notre Dame ===
He returned to Notre Dame as offensive line coach for the 2022 season, and announced his retirement in February 2023.

== Personal life ==
Hiestand and his wife, Terri, have three sons, Michael, Matthew and Mark, and one daughter, Sarah.
