= Drue Tranquill =

American football player (born 1995)

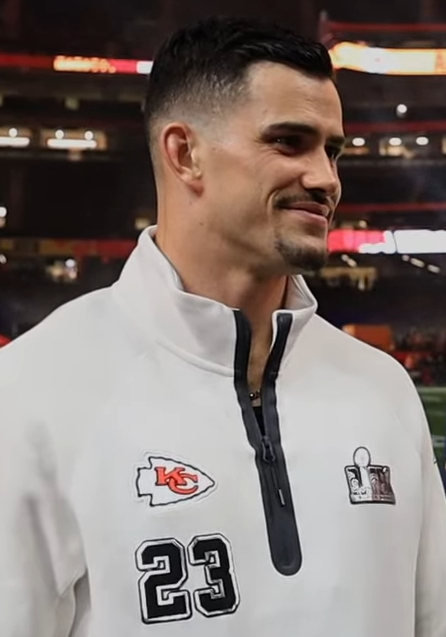
- Tranquill during an interview in 2025 prior to Super Bowl LIX

No. 23 – Kansas City Chiefs
- Position: Linebacker
- Roster status: Active

Personal information
- Born: August 15, 1995 (age 31); Fort Wayne, Indiana, U.S.
- Listed height: 6 ft 2 in (1.88 m)
- Listed weight: 234 lb (106 kg)

Career information
- High school: Carroll (Fort Wayne, Indiana)
- College: Notre Dame (2014–2018)
- NFL draft: 2019: 4th round, 130th overall pick

Career history
- Los Angeles Chargers (2019–2022); Kansas City Chiefs (2023–present)

Awards and highlights
- Super Bowl champion (LVIII); PFWA All-Rookie Team (2019); Wuerffel Trophy (2018)

Career NFL statistics as of Week 6, 2026
- Total tackles: 610
- Sacks: 15.0
- Forced fumbles: 4
- Fumble recoveries: 5
- Pass deflections: 12
- Interceptions: 1
- Stats at Pro Football Reference

Anthony Drue Tranquill (born August 15, 1995) is an American professional football linebacker for the Kansas City Chiefs of the National Football League (NFL). He played college football for the Notre Dame Fighting Irish.

== Early life ==
Tranquill attended Carroll High School in Fort Wayne, Indiana. As a senior in 2013, Tranquill made 75 tackles, including 16 tackles-for-loss, to go with four sacks and an interception as a linebacker. He added 1,420 yards and 28 touchdowns on 114 carries on the ground as a running back, along with 16 receptions for 348 yards and five touchdowns. Tranquill was a four-star recruit coming out of high school, and received offers from several major programs, mostly in the Big Ten Conference. He verbally committed to Purdue University to play college football, but later decommitted and ultimately signed with the University of Notre Dame. Tranquill's younger brother, Justin, played safety for Western Michigan University.

== College career ==
Initially committed to Purdue University, Tranquill decommitted when he received an offer from Notre Dame.

As a true freshman at Notre Dame in 2014, Tranquill played in 11 games with three starts and recorded 33 tackles, a tackle for loss, an interception, a fumble recovery, and a blocked punt. He played in three games as a sophomore in 2015, with one start, but was lost for the season due to a torn ACL suffered while celebrating after breaking up a pass against Georgia Tech on September 19. He collected a medical redshirt for the 2015 season, and was able to play as a graduate student during the 2018 season as a result. As a junior in 2016, Tranquill started all 12 games for the Irish, tallying 79 tackles, two tackles for loss, and an interception. During Tranquill's senior year in 2017, he finished the year with 85 tackles, 10.5 tackles for loss, 1.5 sacks, three fumble recoveries, four passes defended, one interception and one forced fumble while starting all 13 games. At the end of the 2017 season, Tranquill announced that he would return for a 5th year as a graduate student in Mechanical Engineering for the 2018–19 season.

=== Awards and honors ===
- Notre Dame Newcomer of the Year: Defense (2014)
- First-team Academic All-American (2016)
- Wuerffel Trophy Finalist (2017)
- Notre Dame Captain (2017 and 2018)
- Wuerffel Trophy Winner (2018)
- William V. Campbell Trophy Finalist (2018)
- NFF National Scholar-Athlete (2018)
- Cotton Bowl: Dan S. Petty Academic Award (2019)

== Professional career ==
Pre-draft measurables
Height	Weight	Arm length	Hand span	Wingspan	40-yard dash	10-yard split	20-yard split	20-yard shuttle	Three-cone drill	Vertical jump	Broad jump	Bench press
6 ft 2 in (1.88 m)	234 lb (106 kg)	31 1/2 in (0.80 m)	9 3/4 in (0.25 m)	6 ft 2 1/4 in (1.89 m)	4.57 s	1.54 s	2.65 s	4.14 s	6.94 s	37.5 in (0.95 m)	10 ft 2 in (3.10 m)	31 reps
All values from NFL Combine

=== Los Angeles Chargers ===
==== 2019 ====
The Los Angeles Chargers selected Tranquill in the fourth round (130th overall) of the 2019 NFL draft. He was the 14th linebacker drafted in 2019. Tranquill was reunited with Notre Dame teammate Jerry Tillery, who the Chargers drafted in the first round.

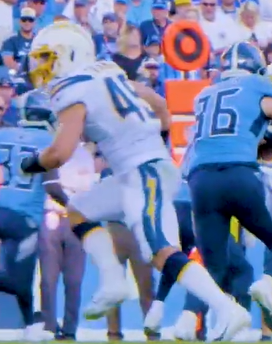
Tranquill in 2019

On May 10, 2019, the Chargers signed Tranquill to a four-year, $3.17 million contract that includes a signing bonus of $658,808. Throughout training camp, Tranquill competed to be a backup middle linebacker against Nick Dzubnar. Head coach Anthony Lynn named Tranquill the third middle linebacker to begin the regular season, behind Denzel Perryman and Nick Dzubnar.

On September 8, 2019, Tranquill made his regular season debut and recorded one solo tackle during a 30–24 victory against the Indianapolis Colts. On November 7, 2019, Tranquill earned his first career start, replacing Denzel Perryman who was inactive due to an ankle injury, and recorded a season-high 14 combined tackles during a 25–23 loss at the Oakland Raiders. The following week, he was inactive due to a calf injury as the Chargers lost 21–17 to the Kansas City Chiefs in Week 11. In Week 12, Tranquill started at outside linebacker and made 7 solo tackles and recorded a season-high three tackles for-a-loss during a 23–20 loss at the Denver Broncos. He finished his rookie campaign with 75 combined tackles (61 solo) and four tackles for-a-loss in 15 games and three starts. He was named to the PFWA All-Rookie Team as a special teamer in 2019. The Los Angeles Chargers finished the 2019 NFL season with a 5–11 record and did not qualify for the playoffs.

==== 2020 ====
Tranquill competed against Kyzir White during training camp to be the starting weakside linebacker after the role was left vacant after the departure of Thomas Davis Sr. Defensive coordinator Gus Bradley named Tranquill the backup weakside linebacker behind White to begin the regular season. In Week 1, Tranquill started the season opener and made one tackle before leaving the Chargers 17–16 victory against the Cincinnati Bengals. On September 15, 2020, He was placed on injured reserve for the remainder of the season after it was discovered he had suffered a broken ankle. On January 4, 2021, the Los Angeles Chargers fired head coach Anthony Lynn and his coaching staff after the Chargers missed the playoffs due to a 7–9 record.

==== 2021 ====
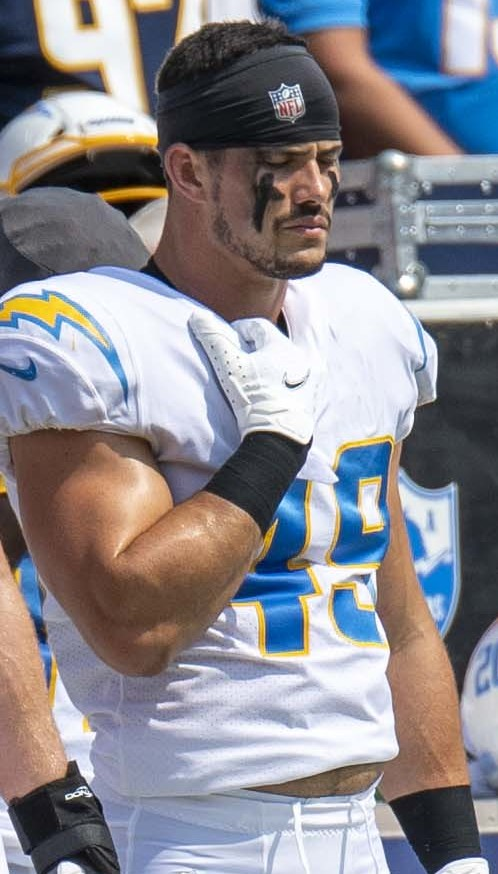
Tranquill with the Los Angeles Chargers in 2021

On January 17, 2021, the Los Angeles Chargers hired former Los Angeles Rams defensive coordinator Brandon Staley as their new head coach. Defensive coordinator Renaldo Hill elected to transition to a base 3–4 defense. During training camp, Tranquill competed against Kyzir White, Kenneth Murray, and Kyler Fackrell to be one of the starting inside linebackers after long-time veteran Denzel Perryman left via free agency. Head coach Brandon Staley named Tranquill a backup inside linebacker to begin the season, behind Kenneth Murray, Kyzir White, and Kyler Fackrell.

In Week 4, Tranquill earned his first start of the season after Kenneth Murray was inactive due to an ankle injury. He finished the Chargers' 28–14 win over the Las Vegas Raiders with five combined tackles (two solo). The following week, he started against the Cleveland Browns, recording a season-high 11 combined tackles (7 solo) and made a tackle for-a-loss as the Chargers won 47–42. The following week, Tranquill was inactive due to a chest injury as the Chargers lost 34–6 at the Baltimore Ravens. In Week 10, Tranquill did not play during a 27–20 loss against the Minnesota Vikings and was listed as reserve/COVID-19. Due to an ankle injury, Tranquill was inactive for Week 17. He finished the season with 76 combined tackles (45 solo), five tackles for-a-loss, 1.5 sacks, and a fumble recovery in 14 games and seven starts. The Los Angeles Chargers finished third in the AFC West and did not qualify for a playoff berth finishing with an 8–9 record.

==== 2022 ====
Tranquill entered training camp slated to be a starting inside linebacker after Kyzir White departed in free agency and Kenneth Murray sustained an ankle injury the previous season. Head coach Brandon Staley named Tranquill and Kyle Van Noy the starting inside linebackers to start 2022, alongside outside linebackers Joey Bosa and Khalil Mack.

On September 11, 2022, Tranquill started in the home-opener against the Las Vegas Raiders and made six combined tackles (four solo), a pass deflection, and intercepted a pass attempt by quarterback Derek Carr during a 24–19 victory. In Week 6, he collected eight combined tackles (six solo) and had a career-high two sacks on quarterback Russell Wilson in a 19–16 victory over the Denver Broncos. On November 13, 2022, Tranquill collected a career-high 15 combined tackles (seven solo) in a 16–22 loss at the San Francisco 49ers. He finished the 2022 NFL season with a career-high 146 combined tackles (95 solo), ten tackles for-a-loss, five sacks, four pass defections, a forced fumble, and one interception in 17 games and 16 starts.

The Los Angeles Chargers finished second in the AFC West with a 10–7 record and qualified for a playoff berth. On January 14, 2023, Tranquill started in his first career playoff game and made five solo tackles as well as an interception off of a tipped pass from Trevor Lawrence as the Chargers lost 31–30 at the Jacksonville Jaguars in the AFC Wildcard Game.

=== Kansas City Chiefs ===
==== 2023 ====
On March 17, 2023, the Kansas City Chiefs signed Tranquill to a one-year, $3.00 million contract that includes $2.45 million guaranteed upon signing and a signing bonus of $1.44 million. Tranquill entered training camp slated to be the primary backup middle linebacker. Head coach Andy Reid officially named him the backup middle linebacker behind Nick Bolton to begin 2023.

On September 7, 2023, Tranquill made his regular season debut as a member of the Kansas City Chiefs, making two combined tackles (one solo) in a 21–20 loss to the Detroit Lions. On September 24, 2023, he earned his first start with the Chiefs in place on Nick Bolton who was inactive due to an ankle injury. Tranquill recorded eight combined tackles (four solo) and made half a sack on Justin Fields during a 41–10 win over the Chicago Bears. In Week 8, he made a season-high 11 combined tackles (seven solo), a tackle for-a-loss, and sacked Russell Wilson as the Chiefs lost 24–10 at the Denver Broncos. In Week 13, Tranquill made two solo tackles before exiting a 27–19 loss at the Green Bay Packers after sustaining a concussion. Due to his concussion, he was inactive the following week. He finished the season with 78 combined tackles (53 solo), 4.5 sacks, seven tackles for-a-loss, two forced fumbles, and a pass deflection in 16 games and seven starts.

The Kansas City Chiefs finished the season atop the AFC West with an 11–6 record, clinching a playoff berth. On January 28, 2024, Tranquill earned his first start of the 2023 postseason and recorded eight solo tackles as the Chiefs defeated the Baltimore Ravens 17–10 in the AFC Championship. On February 11, 2024, Tranquill appeared in Super Bowl LVIII, recording two total tackles as the Chiefs defeated the San Francisco 49ers 25–22.

==== 2024 ====
On March 7, 2024, the Kansas City Chiefs signed Tranquill to a three-year, $19.00 million contract that includes $12.50 million guaranteed upon signing and a signing bonus of $4.50 million. Tranquill had a game-high 11 tackles and one sack in the 40–22 loss to the Eagles in Super Bowl LIX.

==== 2025 ====
Tranquill started every games for the Chiefs during the 2025 season. In the season opener against the Los Angeles Chargers, he recorded five combined tackles and two sacks in a 27–21 loss. In Week 15, Tranquill recorded a season-high 14 combined tackles, including eight solo tackles, in a 16–13 loss to the Chargers.

Tranquill finished the season with 103 combined tackles (55 solo), 10 tackles for loss, two sacks, one pass defended, one forced fumble, and one fumble recovery while appearing in and starting all 17 games. The Chiefs missed the playoffs.

== NFL career statistics ==
Legend
	Won the Super Bowl
**Bold**	Career high

=== Regular season ===
Year	Team	Games		Tackles					Interceptions						Fumbles				
Year	Team	GP	GS	Cmb	Solo	Ast	Sck	TFL	Int	Yds	Avg	Lng	TD	PD	FF	Fmb	FR	Yds	TD
2019	LAC	15	3	75	61	14	0.0	4	0	0	0.0	0	0	1	0	0	0	0	0
2020	LAC	1	1	1	1	0	0.0	0	0	0	0.0	0	0	0	0	0	0	0	0
2021	LAC	14	7	76	45	31	1.5	5	0	0	0.0	0	0	1	0	0	1	**16**	0
2022	LAC	17	16	**146**	**95**	**51**	**5.0**	**10**	**1**	**20**	**20.0**	**20**	0	**4**	1	0	0	0	0
2023	KC	16	8	78	53	25	4.5	7	0	0	0.0	0	0	1	**2**	0	0	0	0
2024	KC	16	16	94	54	40	2.0	4	0	0	0.0	0	0	2	0	0	**2**	3	0
2025	KC	17	17	103	55	48	2.0	**10**	0	0	0.0	0	0	1	1	0	1	0	0
2026	KC	5	5	36	18	18	0.0	5	0	0	0.0	0	0	2	0	0	1	0	0
Career		101	73	610	383	227	15.0	45	1	20	20.0	20	0	12	4	0	5	19	0

=== Postseason ===
Year	Team	Games		Tackles					Interceptions						Fumbles				
Year	Team	GP	GS	Cmb	Solo	Ast	Sck	TFL	Int	Yds	Avg	Lng	TD	PD	FF	Fmb	FR	Yds	TD
2022	LAC	1	1	5	5	0	0.0	0	**1**	**15**	**15.0**	**15**	0	**1**	0	0	0	0	0
2023	KC	4	1	21	**16**	5	0.0	1	0	0	0.0	0	0	0	0	0	0	0	0
2024	KC	3	3	**25**	12	**13**	**1.0**	**2**	0	0	0.0	0	0	0	**1**	0	0	0	0
Career		8	5	51	33	18	1.0	3	1	15	15.0	15	0	1	1	0	0	0	0

== Personal life ==
Tranquill is a Christian. He and his wife, Jackie, have one son and two daughters.

Tranquill won the Chess.com 2023 BlitzChamps II tournament, beating defending champion Chidobe Awuzie.
