= Brad Bars =

American football player (born 1992)

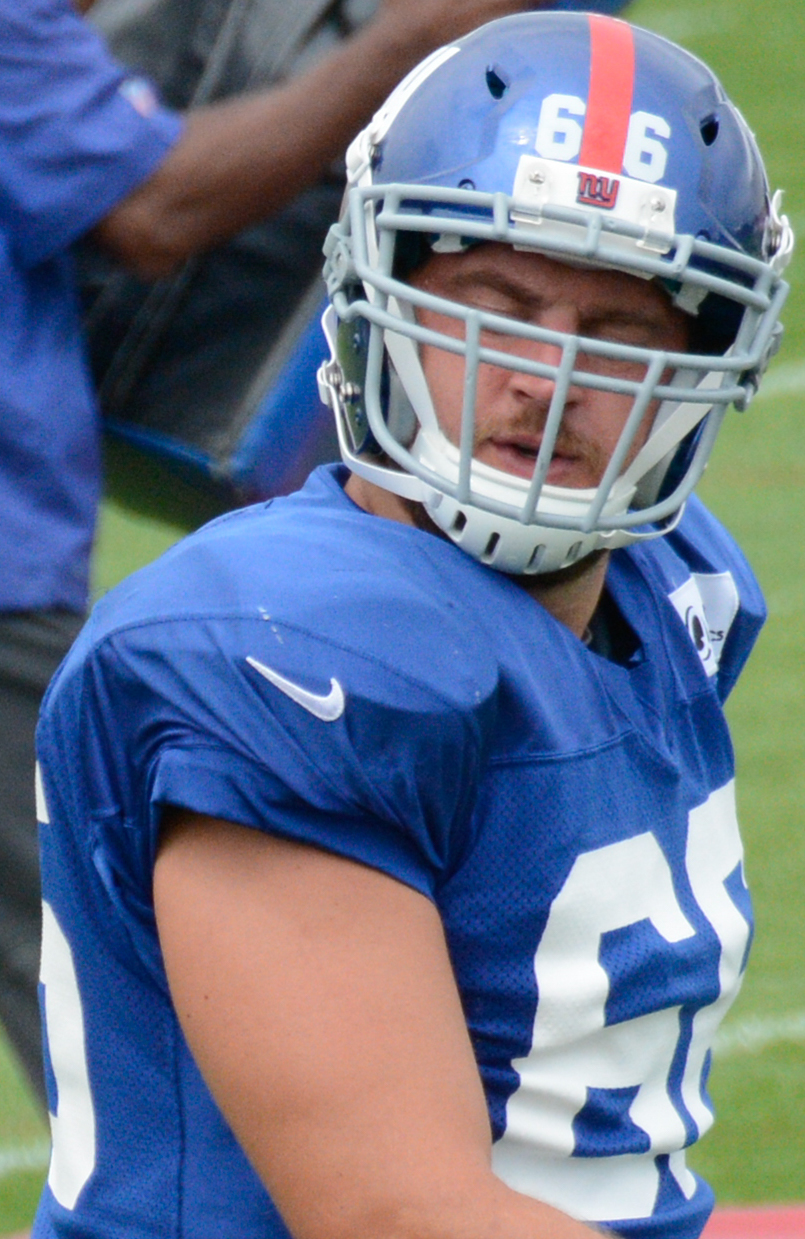
- Bars in 2016

No. 66
- Position: Linebacker

Personal information
- Born: April 24, 1992 (age 34); Chicago, Illinois, U.S.
- Listed height: 6 ft 3 in (1.91 m)
- Listed weight: 251 lb (114 kg)

Career information
- High school: Montgomery Bell Academy (TN)
- College: Penn State
- NFL draft: 2015: undrafted

Career history
- New York Giants (2015)

Career NFL statistics
- Total tackles: 2
- Stats at Pro Football Reference

Brad Bars (born April 24, 1992) is an American businessman and former American football linebacker who played in the National Football League (NFL). He played college football at Penn State.

== Early life ==
Attended Montgomery Bell Academy in Nashville, Tennessee where he played football, basketball, baseball, and track. As a junior and senior, he led the state of Tennessee in tackles (179), tackles for loss (32), and sacks (14) leading to two all state selections. Following his senior year, he was named an All-American (Max Emfinger). A three-star recruit by ESPN, he signed in 2010 to play football at Penn State.

== College career ==
Bars played at Penn State, where he was a four-year letterman and four time Academic All Big Ten from 2011–2014.

== Professional career ==
Bars was ranked the 57th defensive lineman in the draft by nfldraftscout.com where he was projected to be a priority free agent. At Penn State pro day, Bars posted 4.68 40 yard dash, a 4.24 20-yard shuttle, and a 7.05 L cone. Bars also benched 225lbs 27 reps, and jumped 32" and 9'7" in the vertical and broad jump respectively.

After going undrafted in the 2015 NFL draft, Bars attended rookie minicamp with the New York Giants where he signed a contract on August 2, 2015. Bars recorded his first NFL tackle against the Jacksonville Jaguars in Week 2. In Week 4 against the New England Patriots, he recorded 3 tackles. After preseason, he was signed to the 10-man practice squad. On December 25, the New York Giants promoted Bars and tight end Matt LaCosse to the 53-man roster and placed defensive tackle Markus Kuhn and linebacker James Morris on injured reserve.

On September 3, 2016, Bars was released by the Giants.

== Personal life ==
Bars' brother, Alex, played in the NFL from 2019 to 2022 for the Chicago Bears and Las Vegas Raiders.
