= Paul Moala =

American football player (born 2000)

Profile
- Position: Linebacker

Personal information
- Born: January 31, 2000 (age 26); Mishawaka, Indiana, U.S.
- Listed height: 6 ft 0 in (1.83 m)
- Listed weight: 229 lb (104 kg)

Career information
- High school: Penn (Mishawaka, Indiana)
- College: Notre Dame (2018–2021); Idaho (2022); Georgia Tech (2023)
- NFL draft: 2024: undrafted

Career history
- Chicago Bears (2024)*; San Antonio Brahmas (2025)
- * Offseason or practice squad member only

Paula Illoa O Vavau Lahi Moala (born January 31, 2000) is an American professional football linebacker. He played college football for the Notre Dame Fighting Irish, Idaho Vandals, and Georgia Tech Yellow Jackets.

== Early life ==
Moala attended high school at Penn. Coming out of high school, Moala was rated as a three star recruit, and the 20th overall prospect in the State of Indiana. Moala also held offers from schools such as Notre Dame, Iowa, Hawaii, Air Force, Utah State. Ultimately, Moala decided to commit to play college football for the Notre Dame Fighting Irish.

== College career ==
=== Notre Dame ===
During the 2018 season, Moala played in seven games where he made one tackle. In week 13 of the 2019 season, Moala returned a fumble 27 yards for a touchdown, in a win over Navy. In the 2019 season, Moala totaled 14 tackles with one being for a loss, a fumble recovery, a forced fumble, and a touchdown. During the 2020 season, Moala played in just three games where he had seven tackles before tearing his Achilles. In the 2021 season, Moala played in just one game before tearing his Achilles once again. After the conclusion of the 2021 season, Moala decided to enter his name into the NCAA transfer portal.

=== Idaho ===
Moala decided to transfer to play for the Idaho Vandals. During the 2022 season, Moala had a breakout year, totaling 61 tackles with seven being for a loss, five pass deflections, four interceptions, and a forced fumble. After the conclusion of the 2022 season, Moala decided to enter his name into the NCAA transfer portal once again.

=== Georgia Tech ===
Moala transferred to play his final season at Georgia Tech. During Moala's lone season with Georgia Tech, he notched 65 tackles with 11 being for a loss, four sacks, two pass deflections, and three forced fumbles. After the conclusion of the 2023 season, Moala decided to declare for the 2024 NFL draft.

=== Statistics ===
Year	Team	Games		Tackles				Interceptions				Fumbles		
Year	Team	GP	GS	Total	Solo	Ast	Sack	PD	Int	Yds	TD	FF	FR	TD
2018	Notre Dame	7	0	1	1	0	0.0	0	0	0	0	0	0	0
2019	Notre Dame	12	0	14	6	8	0.0	0	0	0	0	1	1	1
2020	Notre Dame	3	0	7	5	2	0.0	0	0	0	0	0	0	0
2021	Notre Dame	1	0	0	0	0	0.0	0	0	0	0	0	0	0
2022	Idaho	12	11	61	29	32	2.0	5	4	21	0	1	0	0
2023	Georgia Tech	13	13	65	37	28	4.0	2	0	0	0	3	0	0
Career		48	24	148	78	70	6.0	7	4	21	0	5	1	1

== Professional career ==
Pre-draft measurables
Height	Weight	Arm length	Hand span	40-yard dash	10-yard split	20-yard split	20-yard shuttle	Three-cone drill	Vertical jump	Broad jump
6 ft 0 1/5 in (1.83 m)	230 lb (104 kg)	31 3/4 in (0.81 m)	9 1/4 in (0.23 m)	4.76 s	1.57 s	2.70 s	4.39 s	7.18 s	36 in (0.91 m)	9 ft 10 in (3.00 m)
All values from Pro Day

=== Chicago Bears ===
After not being selected in the 2024 NFL draft, Moala decided to sign with the Chicago Bears as an undrafted free agent. He was waived on August 26.

=== San Antonio Brahmas ===
On April 28, 2025, Moala signed with the San Antonio Brahmas of the United Football League (UFL).
