= Sam Mustipher =

American football player (born 1996)

No. 69 – Jacksonville Jaguars
- Position: Center
- Roster status: Injured reserve

Personal information
- Born: August 13, 1996 (age 30); Owings Mills, Maryland, U.S.
- Listed height: 6 ft 2 in (1.88 m)
- Listed weight: 306 lb (139 kg)

Career information
- High school: Our Lady of Good Counsel (Olney, Maryland)
- College: Notre Dame (2014–2018)
- NFL draft: 2019: undrafted

Career history
- Chicago Bears (2019–2022); Baltimore Ravens (2023); Denver Broncos (2024)*; Los Angeles Chargers (2024); Tennessee Titans (2025)*; Baltimore Ravens (2025)*; Los Angeles Chargers (2025)*; Denver Broncos (2025); Jacksonville Jaguars (2026–present)
- * Offseason or practice squad member only

Career NFL statistics as of 2025
- Games played: 65
- Games started: 43
- Stats at Pro Football Reference

Samuel Mustipher (born August 13, 1996) is an American professional football center for the Jacksonville Jaguars of the National Football League (NFL). He played college football for the Notre Dame Fighting Irish and was signed by the Chicago Bears as an undrafted free agent in 2019. He has also played for the Baltimore Ravens, Los Angeles Chargers, and Denver Broncos.

== Early life ==
Mustipher played football at Our Lady of Good Counsel in Olney, Maryland. He played on both the offensive and defensive lines. As a senior, Mustipher was named to the Maryland consensus all-state team and the USA Today All-USA Washington D.C. team. A consensus top-250 national recruit, he was selected to play in the Under Armour All-America Game in 2014.

Mustipher was a consensus four-star prospect, and received offers from 26 schools, including Alabama, Clemson, Ohio State, and Notre Dame. Mustipher committed to Notre Dame on April 16, 2013. He signed his letter of intent during the signing period in February 2014, and enrolled in August.

College recruiting
Name	Hometown	School	Height	Weight	Commit date
Sam Mustipher; C	Owings Mills, Maryland	Our Lady of Good Counsel	6 ft 3 in (1.91 m)	285 lb (129 kg)	Apr 16, 2013
Sam Mustipher; C	Recruit ratings: Rivals: 247Sports:				
Overall recruit ranking: Rivals: 12 (OG), 3 (MD) 247Sports: 22 (OG), 11 (MD)
Note: In many cases, Scout, Rivals, 247Sports, On3, and ESPN may conflict in their listings of height and weight.; In these cases, the average was taken. ESPN grades are on a 100-point scale.; Sources: "2014 Team Ranking". Rivals.com.

== College career ==
Mustipher redshirted the 2014 season. In his sophomore season, he saw action in nine games, primarily on special teams and as a reserve offensive lineman. In 2016 as a junior, Mustipher started all 12 games at center. In his senior season in 2017, Mustipher started all 13 games at center, leading a rushing attack that ran for 3,503 yards and scored 35 touchdowns. In addition, Mustipher did not surrender a sack or quarterback hit all season. In 2018, his graduate season, Mustipher was named a captain and once again started all 12 games at center.

== Professional career ==
Pre-draft measurables
Height	Weight	Arm length	Hand span	Wingspan	40-yard dash	10-yard split	20-yard split	20-yard shuttle	Three-cone drill	Vertical jump	Broad jump	Bench press
6 ft 2 1/4 in (1.89 m)	306 lb (139 kg)	32 1/8 in (0.82 m)	9 in (0.23 m)	6 ft 7 1/2 in (2.02 m)	5.63 s	1.96 s	3.25 s	4.84 s	8.25 s	26.5 in (0.67 m)	8 ft 5 in (2.57 m)	20 reps
All values from 2019 Notre Dame Pro Day

=== Chicago Bears ===
After going unselected in the 2019 NFL draft, Mustipher was signed by the Chicago Bears as an undrafted free agent on May 2, 2019. He was waived during final roster cuts on August 31, and subsequently signed to the team's practice squad the next day.

Mustipher was signed to a reserve/future contract with the team at the conclusion of the season on December 30. As in 2019, Mustipher was among the Bears' last roster cuts prior to the 2020 season on September 5, 2020, before joining the practice squad the next day. He was promoted to the active roster on October 14 after James Daniels was placed on injured reserve. Mustipher made his NFL debut on special teams against the Carolina Panthers in Week 6. He appeared in his first game on offense as a center the following week against the Los Angeles Rams after Cody Whitehair left the game with an injury.

=== Baltimore Ravens ===
Mustipher signed with the Baltimore Ravens on May 15, 2023. He was released on August 29, and re-signed to the practice squad two days later. He was elevated to the active roster on September 9, and signed to the active roster on September 19.

=== Denver Broncos ===
On April 4, 2024, Mustipher signed a one-year deal with the Denver Broncos. On August 27, he was released by the Broncos as part of final roster cuts.

=== Los Angeles Chargers ===
On August 28, 2024, Mustipher was signed to the Los Angeles Chargers' practice squad. He was promoted to the active roster on October 30.

=== Tennessee Titans ===
On April 18, 2025, Mustipher signed with the Tennessee Titans. On August 25, he was released by the Titans as part of final roster cuts.

=== Baltimore Ravens (second stint) ===
On September 18, 2025, Mustipher signed with the Baltimore Ravens' practice squad. He was released on September 30.

=== Los Angeles Chargers (second stint) ===
On October 2, 2025, Mustipher signed with the Los Angeles Chargers' practice squad.

=== Denver Broncos (second stint) ===
On December 26, 2025, Mustipher was signed by the Denver Broncos off of the Chargers practice squad following an injury to Luke Wattenberg. He saw playing time in one regular season game and two playoff games, serving as the backup to Alex Forsyth.

=== Jacksonville Jaguars ===
On August 5, 2026, Mustipher signed with the Jacksonville Jaguars. He was placed on injured reserve on August 30.

== Personal life ==
His brother is NFL defensive lineman P. J. Mustipher.
