= Jerry Tillery =

American football player (born 1996)

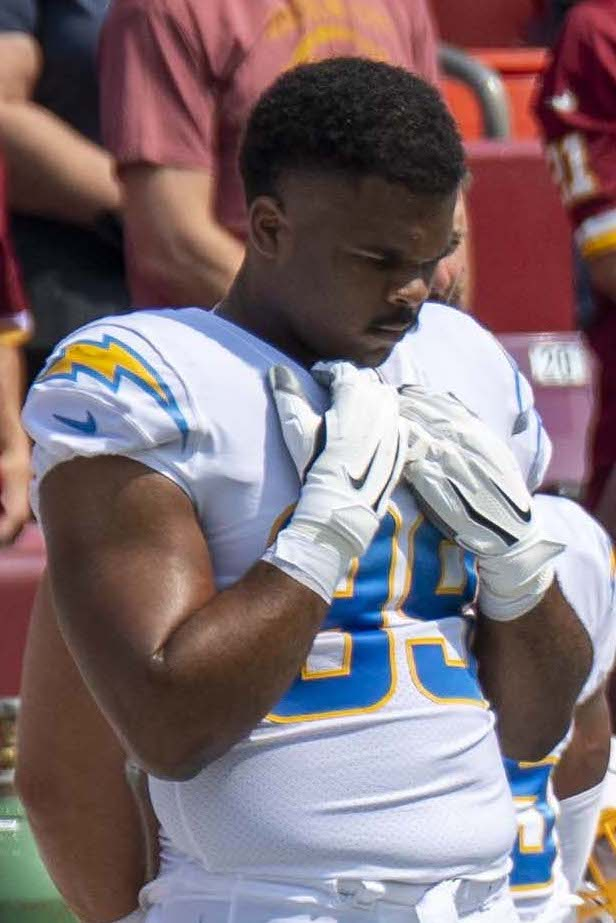
- Tillery with the Los Angeles Chargers in 2021

No. 94 – Indianapolis Colts
- Position: Defensive tackle
- Roster status: Active

Personal information
- Born: October 8, 1996 (age 30); Shreveport, Louisiana, U.S.
- Listed height: 6 ft 6 in (1.98 m)
- Listed weight: 295 lb (134 kg)

Career information
- High school: Evangel Christian Academy (Shreveport)
- College: Notre Dame (2015–2018)
- NFL draft: 2019: 1st round, 28th overall pick

Career history
- Los Angeles Chargers (2019–2022); Las Vegas Raiders (2022–2023); Minnesota Vikings (2024); Kansas City Chiefs (2025); Indianapolis Colts (2026–present)

Career NFL statistics as of Week 9, 2026
- Total tackles: 213
- Sacks: 15.0
- Forced fumbles: 4
- Fumble recoveries: 3
- Pass deflections: 4
- Stats at Pro Football Reference

Jerry Dewayne Tillery Jr. (born October 8, 1996) is an American professional football defensive tackle for the Indianapolis Colts of the National Football League (NFL). He played college football for the Notre Dame Fighting Irish.

== Early life ==
Tillery attended Evangel Christian Academy in Shreveport, Louisiana. As a senior he had 93 tackles and seven sacks. He committed to the University of Notre Dame to play college football.

== College career ==
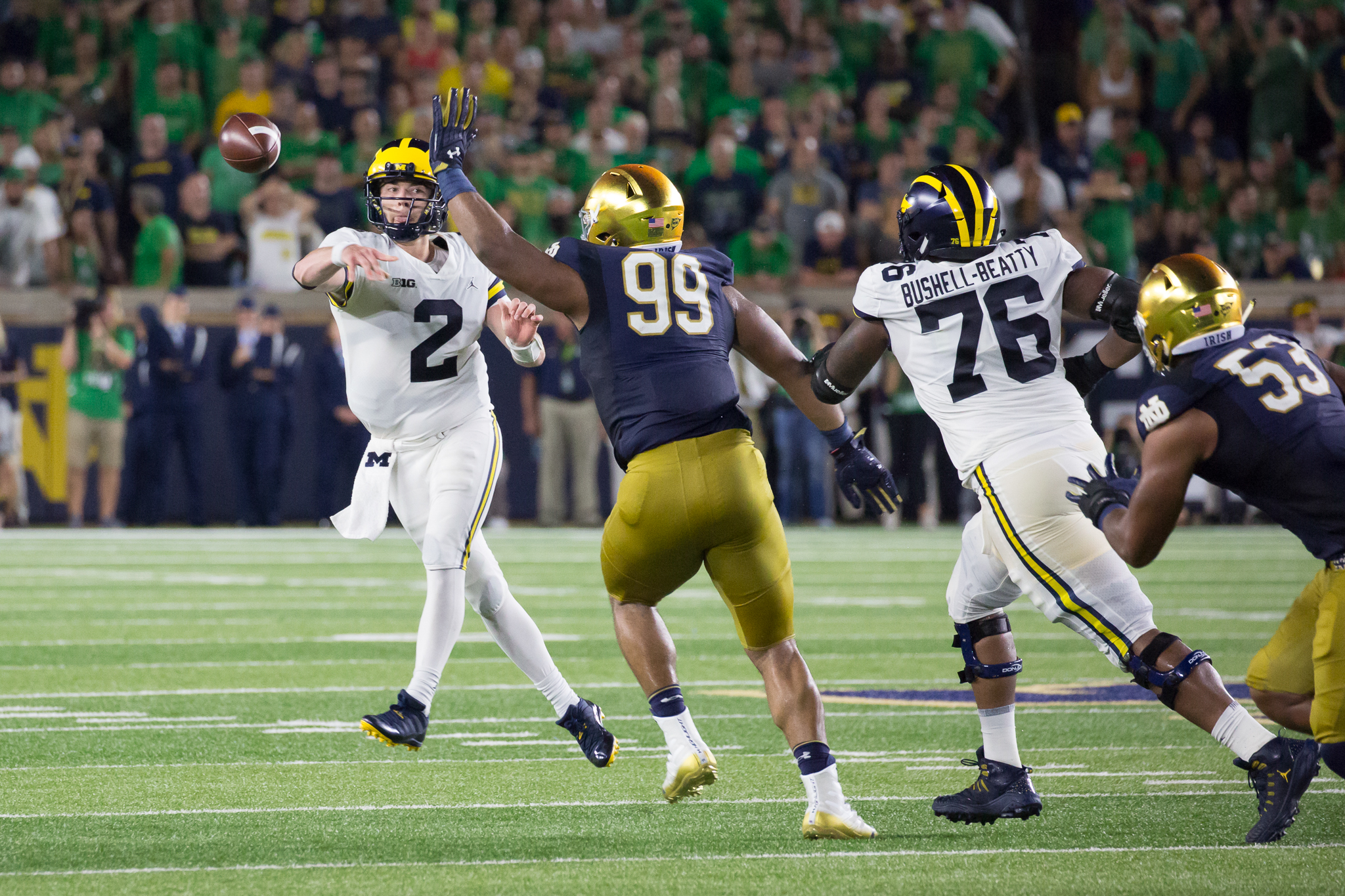
Tillery with the Notre Dame in 2018

Tillery was originally going to play offensive tackle as a freshman at Notre Dame in 2015, but it was later decided he would play defensive tackle. That season, he played in 12 games with three starts and recorded 12 tackles and a sack. As a sophomore in 2016, he started 11 of 12 games, recording 37 tackles. As a junior in 2017, Tillery started all 13 games, finishing the season with 56 tackles and 4.5 sacks. He returned to Notre Dame for his senior year in 2018. He posted a career-high seven sacks during the 2018 season.

== Professional career ==
Pre-draft measurables
Height	Weight	Arm length	Hand span	Wingspan	40-yard dash	10-yard split	20-yard split	20-yard shuttle	Three-cone drill	Vertical jump	Broad jump	Bench press	Wonderlic
6 ft 6 1/2 in (1.99 m)	295 lb (134 kg)	34 1/4 in (0.87 m)	10 5/8 in (0.27 m)	6 ft 9 in (2.06 m)	4.93 s	1.69 s	2.88 s	4.33 s	7.45 s	32.0 in (0.81 m)	9 ft 7 in (2.92 m)	23 reps	31
All values are from the NFL Combine

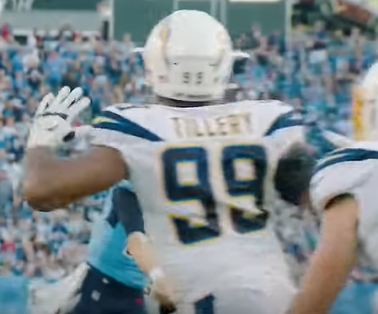
Tillery in 2019

=== Los Angeles Chargers ===
Tillery was selected by the Los Angeles Chargers 28th overall in the first round of the 2019 NFL draft. As a rookie, he appeared in 15 games and made three starts. He had two sacks and 17 total tackles (nine solo).

In Week 9 of the 2020 season against the Las Vegas Raiders, Tillery recorded a strip sack on Derek Carr that he also recovered during the 27–25 loss. This was Tillery's first forced fumble and fumble recovery in the NFL. In the 2020 season, he had three sacks, 30 total tackles (19 solo), two passes defended, two forced fumbles, and one fumble recovery. In the 2021 season, Tillery had 4.5 sacks and 51 total tackles (24 solo) in 16 games and starts.

The Chargers declined the fifth-year option on Tillery's contract on May 2, 2022, making him a free agent after the season. Tillery was waived on November 10, 2022.

=== Las Vegas Raiders ===
On November 14, 2022, Tillery was claimed off waivers by the Las Vegas Raiders. He finished the 2022 season with one sack, 18 total tackles (13 solo), and one forced fumble over 15 games and four starts with both teams.

Tillery re-signed with the Raiders on March 17, 2023. In an October 1 game against the Los Angeles Chargers, Tillery was ejected after a late hit on former teammate Justin Herbert. In the 2023 season, he finished with two sacks, 31 total tackles (11 solo), and one fumble recovery in 17 games and six starts. Tillery was released by the Raiders on March 13, 2024.

=== Minnesota Vikings ===
On March 14, 2024, Tillery signed a one-year, $2.75 million contract with the Minnesota Vikings. He made 17 appearances (including 11 starts) for Minnesota during the regular season, compiling two pass deflections, one forced fumble, and 28 combined tackles.

=== Kansas City Chiefs ===
On March 19, 2025, Tillery signed with the Kansas City Chiefs on a one-year, $1.79 million contract. He made 17 appearances (including three starts) for the Chiefs, posting one fumble recovery, 1.5 sacks, and 20 combined tackles.

=== Indianapolis Colts ===
On March 17, 2026, Tillery signed a one-year, $1.49 million contract with the Indianapolis Colts.

== Career statistics ==
=== NFL ===
Legend
**Bold**	Career high

==== Regular season ====
Year	Team	Games		Tackles					Interceptions						Fumbles				
Year	Team	GP	GS	Cmb	Solo	Ast	Sck	TFL	Int	Yds	Avg	Lng	TD	PD	FF	Fmb	FR	Yds	TD
2019	LAC	15	3	17	9	8	2.0	3	0	0	0.0	0	0	0	0	0	0	0	0
2020	LAC	16	11	30	19	11	3.0	3	0	0	0.0	0	0	**2**	**2**	0	**1**	0	0
2021	LAC	16	15	**51**	**24**	**27**	**4.5**	**6**	0	0	0.0	0	0	0	0	0	0	0	0
2022	LAC	7	0	8	5	3	1.0	0	0	0	0.0	0	0	0	1	0	0	0	0
2022	LV	8	4	10	8	2	0.0	0	0	0	0.0	0	0	0	0	0	0	0	0
2023	LV	17	6	31	11	20	2.0	2	0	0	0.0	0	0	0	0	0	**1**	0	0
2024	MIN	17	11	28	13	15	0.0	1	0	0	0.0	0	0	**2**	1	0	0	0	0
2025	KC	17	3	20	8	12	1.5	2	0	0	0.0	0	0	0	0	0	**1**	0	0
2026	IND	9	4	18	8	10	1.0	3	0	0	0.0	0	0	0	0	0	0	0	0
Career		122	57	213	105	108	15.0	20	0	0	0.0	0	0	4	4	0	3	0	0

==== Postseason ====
Year	Team	Games		Tackles					Interceptions						Fumbles				
Year	Team	GP	GS	Cmb	Solo	Ast	Sck	TFL	Int	Yds	Avg	Lng	TD	PD	FF	Fmb	FR	Yds	TD
2024	MIN	1	0	0	0	0	0.0	0	0	0	0.0	0	0	0	0	0	0	0	0
Career		1	0	0	0	0	0.0	0	0	0	0.0	0	0	0	0	0	0	0	0

=== College ===
Year	Team	Class	Pos	GP	Tackles					Interceptions					Fumbles			
Year	Team	Class	Pos	GP	Solo	Ast	Cmb	TfL	Sck	Int	Yds	Avg	TD	PD	FR	Yds	TD	FF
2015	Notre Dame	FR	DT	6	9	3	12	2.0	1.0	0	0	0.0	0	0	0	0	0	0
2016	Notre Dame	SO	DT	11	19	18	37	3.5	0.0	0	0	0.0	0	0	0	0	0	0
2017	Notre Dame	JR	DT	13	25	31	56	9.0	4.5	0	0	0.0	0	0	0	0	0	1
2018	Notre Dame	SR	DT	12	17	11	28	8.5	7.0	0	0	0.0	0	0	0	0	0	2
Career				43	60	63	123	23	12.5	0	0	0.0	0	0	0	0	0	3
