= Alizé Mack =

American football player (born 1997)

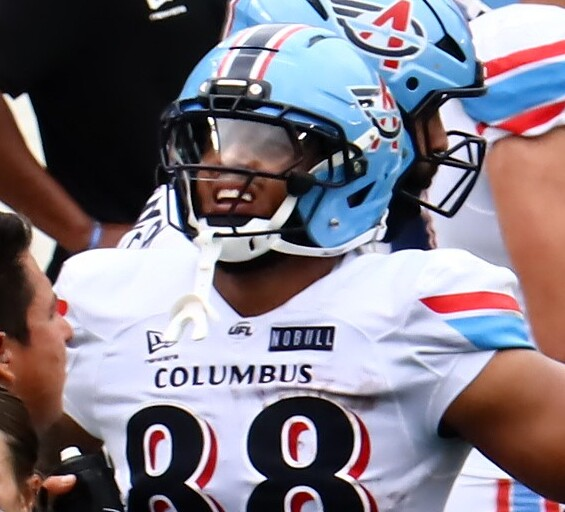
- Mack with the Columbus Aviators in 2026

Profile
- Position: Tight end

Personal information
- Born: March 29, 1997 (age 29); Las Vegas, Nevada, U.S.
- Listed height: 6 ft 4 in (1.93 m)
- Listed weight: 269 lb (122 kg)

Career information
- High school: Bishop Gorman (Las Vegas, Nevada)
- College: Notre Dame (2015–2018)
- NFL draft: 2019: 7th round, 231st overall pick

Career history
- New Orleans Saints (2019)*; Pittsburgh Steelers (2019)*; Kansas City Chiefs (2019–2020)*; Detroit Lions (2021)*; Green Bay Packers (2022)*; San Antonio Brahmas (2023); Tennessee Titans (2023)*; San Antonio Brahmas (2024–2025); Columbus Aviators (2026)
- * Offseason or practice squad member only
- Stats at Pro Football Reference

Alizé Khyree Mack (born Alizé Jones; March 29, 1997) is an American professional football tight end. He played college football for the Notre Dame Fighting Irish.

== Early life ==
Mack attended Bishop Gorman High School in Summerlin, Nevada, where he went by Alizé Jones. He finished his high school career with 85 receptions for 1,725 yards and 27 touchdowns. In his senior year he was named to the U.S. Army All-American Bowl, USA Today All-USA First-team and First-team All-State after ending the season with 41 receptions, 930 yards and 13 touchdowns. At Bishop Gorman, Mack was teammates with fellow future Notre Dame football player Nicco Fertitta.

Considered a four-star recruit by Rivals.com, he was rated as the 4th best tight end prospect of his class. He had previously been committed to UCLA, but flipped his commitment to Notre Dame.

College recruiting
Name	Hometown	School	Height	Weight	Commit date
Aliz'e Jones; TE	Las Vegas, Nevada	Bishop Gorman HS	6 ft 4.5 in (1.94 m)	218 lb (99 kg)	Jan 15, 2015
Aliz'e Jones; TE	Recruit ratings: Scout: Rivals: (86)				
Overall recruit ranking: Scout: 2 (TE), 32 (national) ESPN: 1 (TE), 1 (NV), 1 (regional), 52 (national)
Note: In many cases, Scout, Rivals, 247Sports, On3, and ESPN may conflict in their listings of height and weight.; In these cases, the average was taken. ESPN grades are on a 100-point scale.; Sources: "Notre Dame Football Commitment List". Rivals.; "Notre Dame College Football Recruiting Commits". Scout.; "ESPN". ESPN.; "Scout.com Team Recruiting Rankings". Scout.; "2015 Team Ranking". Rivals.com.

== College career ==
=== Freshman ===
After impressing coaches with his excellent pass catching ability, Mack quickly found a spot in Notre Dame's passing game. Mack made the most of his targeted passes, ending the season with just over 15 yards per catch, including three receptions over 30 yards. Mack came up big for the Irish in critical moments against both Temple and USC. Late in the game against USC, Mack had a clutch 35-yard catch-and-run deep into USC territory, which set up a tie-breaking touchdown. This, plus other timely plays in critical situations, quickly established Mack as a dependable player.

== Professional career ==
Pre-draft measurables
Height	Weight	Arm length	Hand span	Wingspan	40-yard dash	10-yard split	20-yard split	20-yard shuttle	Three-cone drill	Vertical jump	Broad jump	Bench press
6 ft 4 in (1.93 m)	249 lb (113 kg)	33 3/4 in (0.86 m)	9 3/8 in (0.24 m)	6 ft 8 1/8 in (2.04 m)	4.70 s	1.62 s	2.74 s	4.34 s	7.27 s	36.0 in (0.91 m)	10 ft 0 in (3.05 m)	22 reps
All values from NFL Combine

=== New Orleans Saints ===
Mack was drafted by the New Orleans Saints in the seventh round (231st overall) of the 2019 NFL draft. He was waived on August 31, 2019, and was signed to the practice squad the next day. Mack was released on September 20.

=== Pittsburgh Steelers ===
On September 25, 2019, Mack was signed to the Pittsburgh Steelers practice squad. He was released by Pittsburgh on October 2.

=== Kansas City Chiefs ===
On November 6, 2019, Mack was signed to the Kansas City Chiefs practice squad. He was released on November 30. He signed a reserve/future contract with the Chiefs on January 9, 2020. He was waived by Kansas City on May 4.

=== Detroit Lions ===
On February 11, 2021, Mack signed with the Detroit Lions. He was waived on August 31, and re-signed to the practice squad the next day, but released the following day.

=== Green Bay Packers ===
On February 7, 2022, Mack signed with the Green Bay Packers. He was waived/injured on August 30, and placed on injured reserve. Mack was released off injured reserve on September 2.

=== San Antonio Brahmas (first stint) ===
On November 17, 2022, Mack was drafted by the San Antonio Brahmas of the XFL. He was released from his contract on May 17, 2023.

=== Tennessee Titans ===
On May 17, 2023, Mack signed with the Tennessee Titans. He was waived by Tennessee on August 28.

=== San Antonio Brahmas (second stint) ===
On January 19, 2024, Mack re-signed with the San Antonio Brahmas.

=== Columbus Aviators ===
On January 12, 2026, Mack was allocated to the Columbus Aviators of the United Football League (UFL).
