= Alex Bars =

American football player (born 1995)

No. 64
- Position: Guard

Personal information
- Born: September 8, 1995 (age 31); Nashville, Tennessee, U.S.
- Listed height: 6 ft 5 in (1.96 m)
- Listed weight: 334 lb (151 kg)

Career information
- High school: Montgomery Bell Academy (Nashville)
- College: Notre Dame (2014–2018)
- NFL draft: 2019: undrafted

Career history
- Chicago Bears (2019–2021); Las Vegas Raiders (2022)

Career NFL statistics
- Games played: 53
- Games started: 25
- Stats at Pro Football Reference

Alex M. Bars (born September 8, 1995) is an American former professional football player who was a guard in the National Football League (NFL). He played college football for the Notre Dame Fighting Irish and was signed as an undrafted free agent by the Chicago Bears following the 2019 NFL draft.

== College career ==
Bars was a member of the Notre Dame Fighting Irish for five seasons. He spent his freshman year on the scout team before playing in six games with two starts as a sophomore. He started all 12 of Notre Dame's games at right tackle as a junior and all 13 games of his senior year at left guard. Bars returned as a graduate student for a fifth season of NCAA eligibility and was named a preseason All-American by the Sporting News, but tore his MCL and ACL five games into the season against Stanford. Over the course of his college career, Bars played in 36 games with 32 starts.

== Professional career ==
Pre-draft measurables
Height	Weight	Arm length	Hand span
6 ft 5 7/8 in (1.98 m)	312 lb (142 kg)	31 3/4 in (0.81 m)	9 3/8 in (0.24 m)
All values from NFL Combine

=== Chicago Bears ===
Bars signed with the Chicago Bears as an undrafted free agent on May 2, 2019. Bars was waived at the end of training camp during final roster cuts, but was re-signed to the team's practice squad on September 1. The Bears promoted Bars to the active roster on October 15. He made his NFL debut on November 28, against the Detroit Lions. Bars played in five games during his rookie season.

Bars made his first career start on November 8, 2020, in a 17–24 loss to the Tennessee Titans, lining up at center despite having never played the position and playing all 77 of the Bears' offensive snaps. Bars played in all 16 regular season games and started the last eight with one start at center, one start at left guard and six starts at right guard. He signed a contract extension with the team on March 3, 2021.

=== Las Vegas Raiders ===
On March 27, 2022, Bars signed a one-year contract with the Las Vegas Raiders. He was waived on August 30. On September 6, Bars was signed to the practice squad. Bars was elevated to the active roster on September 17, for the team's Week 2 game against the Arizona Cardinals and on September 24, for the team's Week 3 game against the Tennessee Titans and on both cases was then reverted to the practice squad the next day. On October 1, the Raiders signed Bars to their active roster from the practice squad.

On March 30, 2023, Bars re–signed with Las Vegas. On August 29, Bars was released by the Raiders.

== Personal life ==
Bars' brother, Brad, played in the NFL in 2015 for the New York Giants.

Bars is second cousins with streamer Nickmercs.
