= Tagovailoa =

Tagovailoa is a surname. Notable people with the surname include:

- Myron Tagovailoa-Amosa (born 1999), American football player
- Tua Tagovailoa (born 1998), American football player
- Taulia Tagovailoa (born 2000), American football player
