= Laurence Vincent =

Laurence Vincent is an American author, professor, marketer and public speaker. He has written two books on brand marketing. He is an associate professor of the Practice of Marketing at the USC Marshall School of Business. He served as Chief Branding Officer of United Talent Agency and founded UTA Brand Studio.

== Personal history ==
Vincent graduated from Buena Park High School, in Buena Park, California. He earned his bachelor's degree from the University of Southern California where he majored in theatre and attended the School of Cinematic Arts. He received an MBA from the Marshall School of Business, also at USC.

== Writing career ==
Vincent has written three books, two of which focus on branding. Both books address a common theme of brand narrative, or the potential for a brand to tell a story in the mind of customers and employees. In Brand Real, he also wrote about the importance of credible brand experiences that consistently deliver on a promise. That book was selected by Strategy+Business magazine as one of the Best Business Books of 2012 Vincent has written articles for European Business Review and The Conference Board.

== Published works ==
- 2012: Brand Real: How Smart Companies Live Their Brand Promise and Inspire Fierce Customer Loyalty, ISBN 978-0814416761
- 2007: Mad Man's Creed, ISBN 978-0979569302
- 2002: Legendary Brands: Unleashing the Power of Storytelling to Create a Winning Market Strategy, ISBN 978-0793155606

== Articles ==
- Brand Real (European Business Review, 2012)
- Our Brands, Ourselves: The Power of Attachment (The Conference Board, Summer 2012)
