= Kapolei High School =

Coordinates: 21°20.1025′N 158°3.3294′W

Location
- 91-5007 Kapolei Parkway; Kapolei, Hawaii 96707; United States

Information
- Type: Public, Co-educational
- Motto: "Caring, Dignity, and Integrity"
- Established: 2000
- School district: Leeward District
- Principal: Wesley Shinkawa (2019-present)
- Faculty: 127.00 (on an FTE basis)
- Grades: 9–12
- Enrollment: 2,025 (2022–23)
- Student to teacher ratio: 15.94
- Campus: Indoor
- Colors: Teal, black, and silver
- Athletics: Oahu Interscholastic Association
- Mascot: Hurricane
- Rival: Campbell High School
- Yearbook: Kapolei Watch
- Military: United States Marine Corps JROTC
- Website: http://www.kapoleihigh.org

Kapolei High School, located in Kapolei community, in the City and County of Honolulu, Hawaii, United States, on the Island of Oahu, is a public high school. It is a part of the Hawaii Department of Education.

On July 24, 2000, Kapolei opened with first-year students. In the 2006–2007 school year, Kapolei High School had over 2,300 students in grades 9–12. Its mascot is the Hurricanes, and the school colors are teal, black and silver. The school's football field has been used as the practice field for the Pro Bowl.

Due to the school's MCJROTC achievements, the school is recognized as a Naval Honor School for JROTC.

On November 21, 2026, the Kapolei High School boys football team won their first state open division championship in school history, beating Kamehameha School 31-7.

== Notable alumni ==
- Julius Buelow, American football player
- Shandon Hopeau, professional soccer player
- Darius Kila, member of the Hawaii House of Representatives
- De'Zhaun Stribling, American football player
- Myron Tagovailoa-Amosa, American football player
