= Barry Migliorini =

Basketball head coach

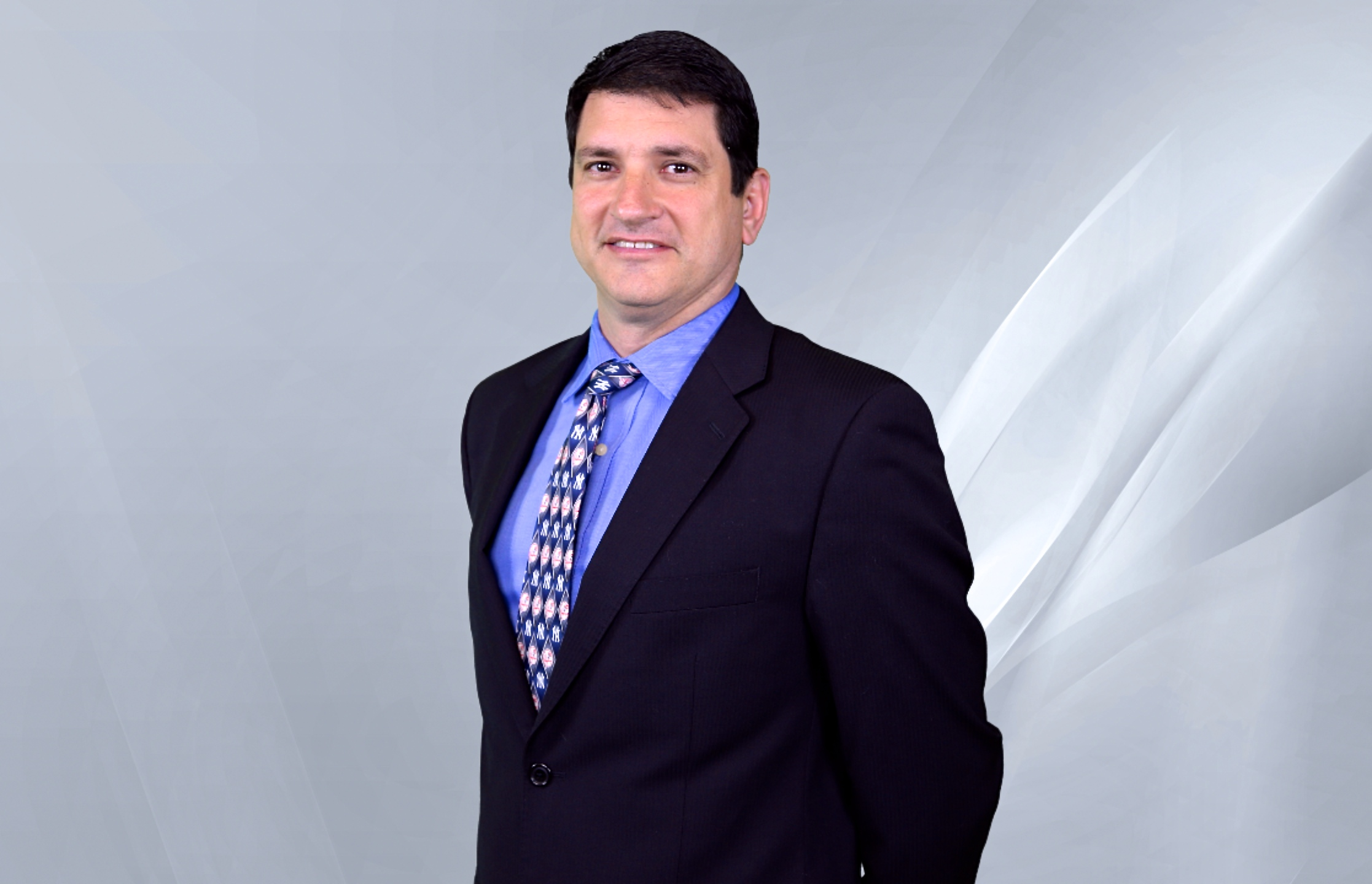
- Migliorini in Los Angeles, March, 2015
- Born: Barry Migliorini; July 18, 1966 (age 60); Cherry Hill, New Jersey, U.S.
- Occupation: Basketball Coach

Barry Migliorini (born July 18, 1966) is an American former basketball coach. He was the head coach for the California Dream of the American Basketball Association (ABA).

== Early years ==
After prepping at Fountain Valley High School, Migliorini ran cross country and track as a student-athlete at the University of Southern California for coach Larry Knuth.

== Career ==
=== Coaching career ===
Prior to coaching in the ABA Migliorini was an assistant coach at NCAA Division II California State University, Los Angeles under coach Stephen Thompson (basketball). In 2014 Migliorini was named a top 20 assistant college basketball coach by college sports madness.

Before coaching basketball Migliorini was a high school cross country running and track and field coach at Fountain Valley High School in Fountain Valley California and Buena Park High School. His cross country teams were ranked in the top-25 nationally for five consecutive years, from 2002-2007. In 11 years, he had 60 student-athletes earn college athletic scholarships, and coached four student-athletes to Footlocker All-America honors. Migliorini was the high school coach of Nicholas Arciniaga who has finished as the top American runner at Boston, Los Angeles, Houston, and Minnesota Marathons. Migliorini was the subject of criticism for his high mileage coaching tactics.

Most recently Migliorini was the head Women's Basketball coach at Golden West College in California where he built a high-powered offensive program, establishing the team as one of the top-scoring units in the nation. In their second season, the team stormed to a 10-2 start while averaging an impressive 92 points per game before the COVID-19 shutdown. Under Miglliorinis leadership, Golden West led the nation in scoring heading into the Christmas break in both 2022 and 2023 while also leading the state of California in 100-point games during those seasons.

=== Business career ===
Following college Migliorini was a sports agent who represented MLB player Mike Vento, of the New York Yankees, and NFL football player Ryan Smith of the Carolina Panthers among other professional athletes.

In 2002, while working as an Investment Banker with National Capital Migliorini signed a contract with Aethlon Medical (AEMD) valued at $161,537. In November 2014 the stock sky rocked to $26 a share and moved to Nasdaq after AEMD announced its patented Hemopurifier could treat the Ebola virus.

In an 8k filing with the U.S. Securities and Exchange Commission dated September 18, 2015 Migliorini received 6,000 shares of American Housing Income Trust. . At the time American Housing Income Trust (AHIT) traded at $7000 per share giving the contract a total value of $42,002,000. On December 4, 2015, AHIT terminated its Consulting Agreement with Barry Migliorini without requesting any re-numeration. AHIT merged with Corix Bio-science (CXBS) on March 14, 2017 and changed company focus to develop proprietary cannabis and industrial hemp strains. On February 26, 2016 Migliorini spoke at the Alternative Asset conference in Miami as an expert in blockchain technology and Cannabis.

A local publication listed Migliorini as one of the wealthiest people with ties to Fountain Valley possessing a net worth of $650,000,000, but this is disputed by independent reporting.

=== Authorial work ===
Barry Migliorini made his debut as an author in 2025 with the self published business guide AI Millionaire: How to Build Wealth and Freedom in the Age of Automation, released May 8, 2025 (ASIN B0F85ZJPSP). In it, Migliorini, drawing on his tenure as CEO of Wellness Matrix Group (the first medical AI company to reach a US $1 billion market cap) and his earlier career in investment banking, lays out a step by step playbook for solo entrepreneurs to build scalable, AI powered businesses using no code tools, automation, and digital marketing strategies.. Since its publication, AI Millionaire has been cited in entrepreneurship forums and business podcasts for its accessible, practitioner focused approach to AI adoption in small enterprises.

=== Legal matters ===
In May 1998 Migliorini was a co-defendant along with Andrew Shoemaker, and Alan C. Greenberg "Ace" in a fraud, churning and unauthorized trading case. Migliorini who held a 24 license was additionally accused of "failure to supervise". In total including attorney fees, interest and punitive damages the plaintiff was seeking over $1,000,000 in relief. The defendants prevailed in its entirety and the case was expunged from Migliorini's CRD record.

In 2020 Migliorini was named as defendant in cases filed by The State of California and The Securities and Exchange Commission. Migliorini the former CEO of the now-defunct Wellness Matrix Group Inc., reached a settlement with the Los Angeles City Attorney's office, resolving allegations of illegal business practices. The settlement included no admission of liability, a civil penalty of $500,000, and restitution of $18,000, with Migliorini stating that the final amount could be reduced to under $4,000. He cited the cost-effectiveness of settlement over trial as a deciding factor. The case included a default judgment against George Todt, former Vice President of Business Development for Wellness Matrix, amounting to $2 million in penalties. Migliorini cooperated with the investigation, emphasizing his efforts to ensure refunds and asserted that the minor penalties reflected his limited involvement. Migliorini was also dismissed from the case brought by the Securities and Exchange Commission, while Todt and Wellness Matrix Group Inc. remained defendants.

In 2022, jewelry designer Steven Zale filed a police report alleging that businessman Migliorini had stolen a 478.45-carat ruby, accusing him of grand theft under California Penal Code 487(A). Migliorini contended that he had provided Zale with substantial loans and that the ruby had been given to him as collateral. Following the allegations, Migliorini voluntarily surrendered to the authorities. The district attorney dismissed all charges after discovering that Zale had committed perjury by falsely denying he had three prior felony convictions. In the aftermath of the dismissal, Migliorini claimed that Zale financed the publication of defamatory and false articles about him. As a result, Migliorini initiated legal action, filing a $100 million lawsuit in the Superior Court of California, County of Los Angeles. The lawsuit alleges defamation and conspiracy against multiple defendants, including Steven Zale, GoDaddy, and the County of Los Angeles. Court filings show Migliorini is still in possession of the Ruby.
