= Josh Tupou =

American football player (born 1994)

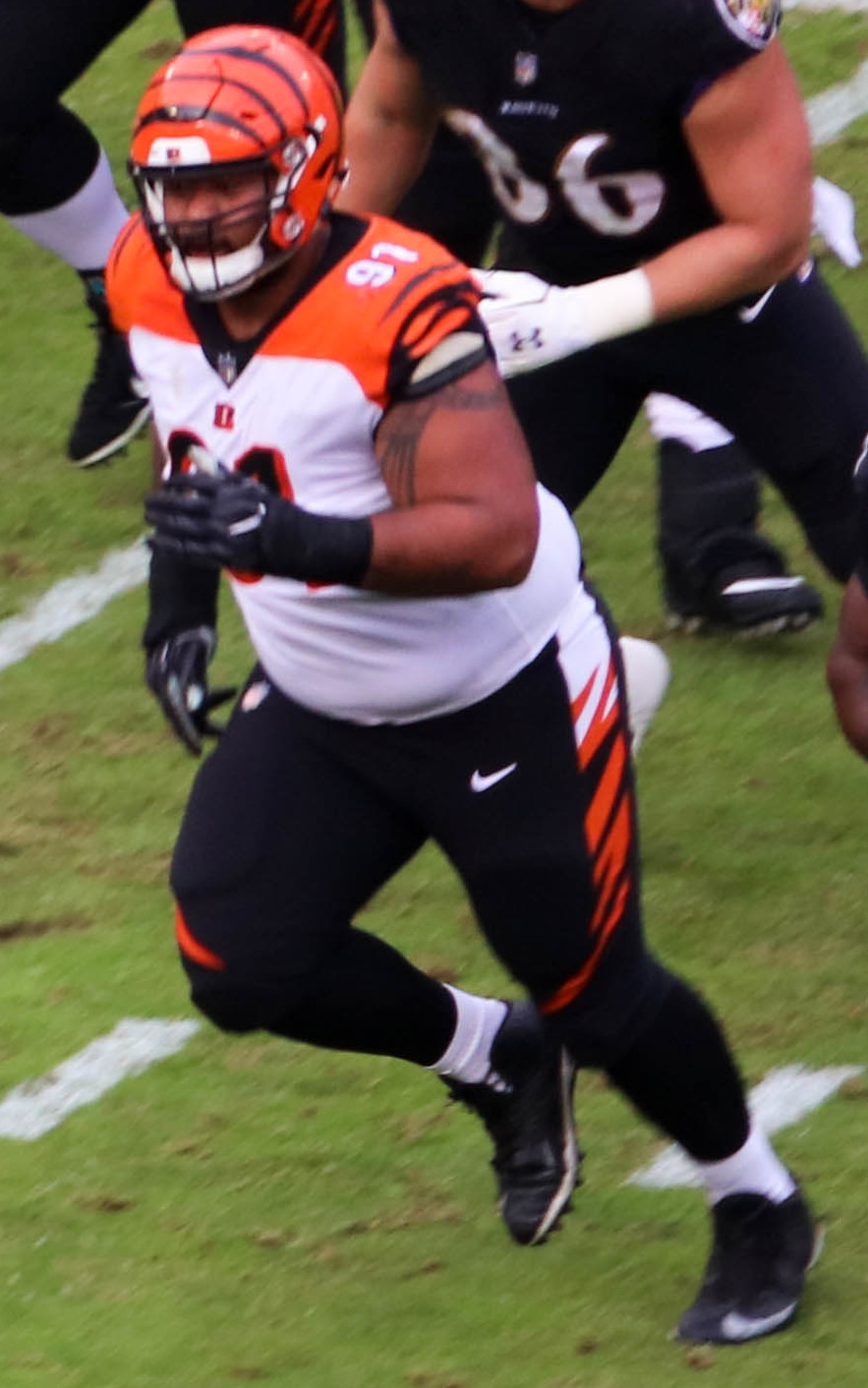
- Tupou with the Cincinnati Bengals in 2018

Profile
- Position: Defensive tackle

Personal information
- Born: May 2, 1994 (age 32); Long Beach, California, U.S.
- Listed height: 6 ft 3 in (1.91 m)
- Listed weight: 350 lb (159 kg)

Career information
- High school: Buena Park (Buena Park, California)
- College: Colorado (2012–2016)
- NFL draft: 2017: undrafted

Career history
- Cincinnati Bengals (2017–2023); Baltimore Ravens (2024); Indianapolis Colts (2025)*; Baltimore Ravens (2025)*; New York Giants (2026)
- * Offseason or practice squad member only

Career NFL statistics as of 2025
- Total tackles: 94
- Sacks: 3
- Forced fumbles: 1
- Stats at Pro Football Reference

Joshua Enelangi Tupou (born May 2, 1994) is an American professional football defensive tackle. He played college football for the Colorado Buffaloes.

== Professional career ==
Pre-draft measurables
Height	Weight	Arm length	Hand span	Wingspan	40-yard dash	10-yard split	20-yard split	20-yard shuttle	Three-cone drill	Vertical jump	Broad jump	Bench press
6 ft 2 3/4 in (1.90 m)	353 lb (160 kg)	31 3/4 in (0.81 m)	9 7/8 in (0.25 m)	6 ft 7 7/8 in (2.03 m)	5.30 s	1.92 s	3.09 s	5.00 s	8.22 s	23.5 in (0.60 m)	7 ft 5 in (2.26 m)	27 reps
All values from Pro Day

=== Cincinnati Bengals ===
Tupou signed with the Cincinnati Bengals as an undrafted free agent on May 5, 2017. He was waived on September 2, 2017 and was signed to the practice squad the next day. He was promoted to the active roster on November 11, 2017. He was waived by the Bengals on November 21, 2017 and was signed to the practice squad the next day. He was promoted back to the active roster on December 6, 2017.

On November 22, 2018, Tupou was placed on injured reserve after suffering a torn pectoral in practice.

Tupou re-signed with the Bengals on May 1, 2020. On August 3, 2020, Tupou announced he would opt out of the 2020 season due to the COVID-19 pandemic.

On March 17, 2022, Tupou re-signed with the Bengals.

Tupou recorded his first career sack against the Miami Dolphins in week 4 of the 2022 season. The sack gave Dolphins quarterback Tua Tagovailoa a concussion that forced him to leave the game.

=== Baltimore Ravens (first stint) ===
On May 28, 2024, Tupou signed with the Baltimore Ravens. He was released on August 27. He re-signed to the practice squad on October 28.

=== Indianapolis Colts ===
On July 28, 2025, Tupou signed with the Indianapolis Colts. He was released on August 26 as part of final roster cuts and re-signed to the practice squad the next day. Tupou was released on September 1.

=== Baltimore Ravens (second stint) ===
On September 24, 2025, Tupou signed with the Baltimore Ravens' practice squad. He was released on October 7 and re-signed to the practice squad one week later.

=== New York Giants ===
On May 27, 2026, Tupou signed a one-year contract with the New York Giants. The move reunited him with head coach John Harbaugh after spending the last season with him on the Baltimore Ravens' practice squad. Tupou was released by the Giants on August 30; he was re-signed to the team's practice squad the following day. On September 16, Tupou was signed to the active roster. On September 30, Tupou was released and re-signed to the practice squad. He was released on November 2.

== Personal life ==
Born in Long Beach, California, Tupou is of Tongan descent.
