= Nicholas Arciniaga =

American long-distance runner

Nick Arciniaga
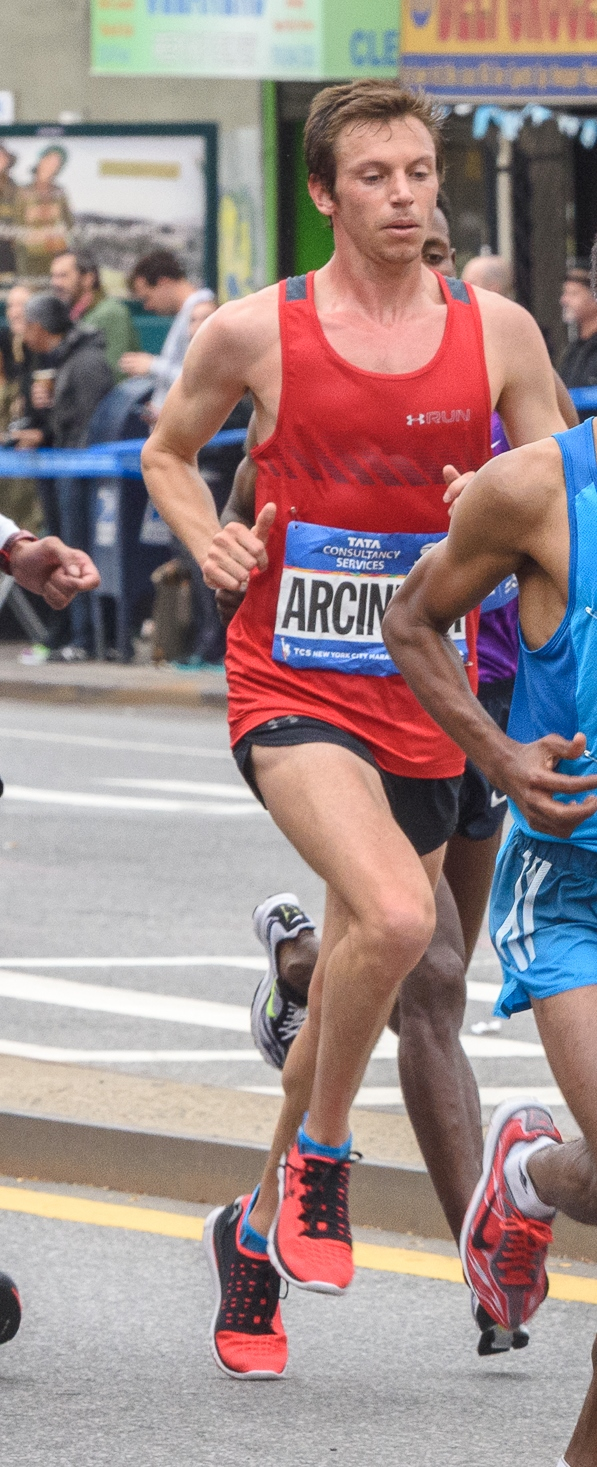
- Arciniaga at the 2015 New York City Marathon

Personal information
- Nationality: American
- Born: June 30, 1983 (age 43) Fountain Valley, California

Sport
- Sport: Track, long-distance running
- Events: 5000 meters, 10,000 meters, marathon
- College team: Cal State Fullerton
- Club: Team Run Flagstaff Pro
- Team: Under Armour

Achievements and titles
- Personal bests: 10,000 meters: 28:29.71; Half marathon: 1:03:22; Marathon: 2:11:30

Nicholas Arciniaga is an American long-distance runner who competed at the 2011 World Championships in Athletics and finished 7th at the 2014 Boston Marathon.

== Running career ==
=== High school ===
Arciniaga attended Fountain Valley High School, where he ran cross country and track under coach Barry Migliorini. He started out as an 800-meter runner before he made a transition to longer-distance events.

=== Collegiate ===
Arciniaga competed in college for the Cal State Fullerton Titans and graduated in 2006. He specialized in the 5K. He was also the men's 1500-meter champion at the 2005 Cal-Nevada Track & Field Championships.

=== Post-collegiate ===
After college, Arciniaga moved to distance-running hub Flagstaff, Arizona, where he began a training program with coach Greg McMillian.

In 2007, Nick ran 2:17:08 at New York Marathon in November.

In 2009, Nick ran 2:13:46 at New York Marathon in November.

In 2011 (January 30), Arciniaga competed in the Chevron Houston Marathon where he finished 2nd in a time of 2:11:30. During the summer that same year, Arciniaga competed in the men's marathon at the world championships where he finished 41st.

In 2012, Arciniaga placed 8th representing McMillan Elite adidas in 2:11:56 at 2012 Olympic Marathon Trials in Houston, Texas on January 14, 2012.

In 2013, Arciniaga won the Twin Cities Marathon and placed 1st in St. Paul, MN in a season best time of 2:13:11 on October 6 at 2013 Medtronic Twin Cities Marathon.

In 2014, Arciniaga finished 7th at the 2014 Boston Marathon. Nick Arciniaga was 9th in 2:14:31 in Duluth, MN at 2014 Grandma's Marathon on June 21.

In 2015, he began training for the 10K on the track with Scott Smith, peaking in the spring. On May 1, 2015, he set his 10,000 meter personal best in the second section of the men's 10K at the Payton Jordan Invitational, recording 28:29.71.
