= Mike Vento =

American baseball player (born 1978)

- Outfielder
- Born: May 25, 1978 (age 47); Albuquerque, New Mexico, U.S.
- Batted: Right Threw: Right

MLB debut
- September 13, 2005, for the New York Yankees

Last MLB appearance
- June 9, 2006, for the Washington Nationals

MLB statistics
- Batting average: .250
- Home runs: 0
- Runs batted in: 1

CPBL statistics
- Batting average: .292
- Home runs: 1
- Runs batted in: 1
- Stats at Baseball Reference

Teams
- New York Yankees (2005); Washington Nationals (2006); Sinon Bulls (2008)

Michael Vento (born May 25, 1978) is a former Major League Baseball outfielder.

== Career ==
Vento was represented by sports agent Barry Migliorini and Advantage Link during his first MLB contract negotiations with the New York Yankees.
