= Migliorini =

Migliorini is an Italian surname. Notable people with the surname include:

- Andrea Migliorini (born 1988), Italian footballer playing for Melbourne Heart
- Barry Migliorini (born 1966), American professional basketball coach
- Bruno Migliorini (1896–1975), Italian linguist and philologist
- Giovanni Migliorini (1931–1980), retired Italian professional football player
- Marco Migliorini (born 1992), Italian footballer playing for Salernitana
- Renato Migliorini (1926–2008), Brazilian physician, biomedical scientist, biochemist and full professor of physiology

== See also ==
- 5246 Migliorini, Mars-crossing asteroid discovered on 26 July 1979
