= Nik Needham =

American football player (born 1996)

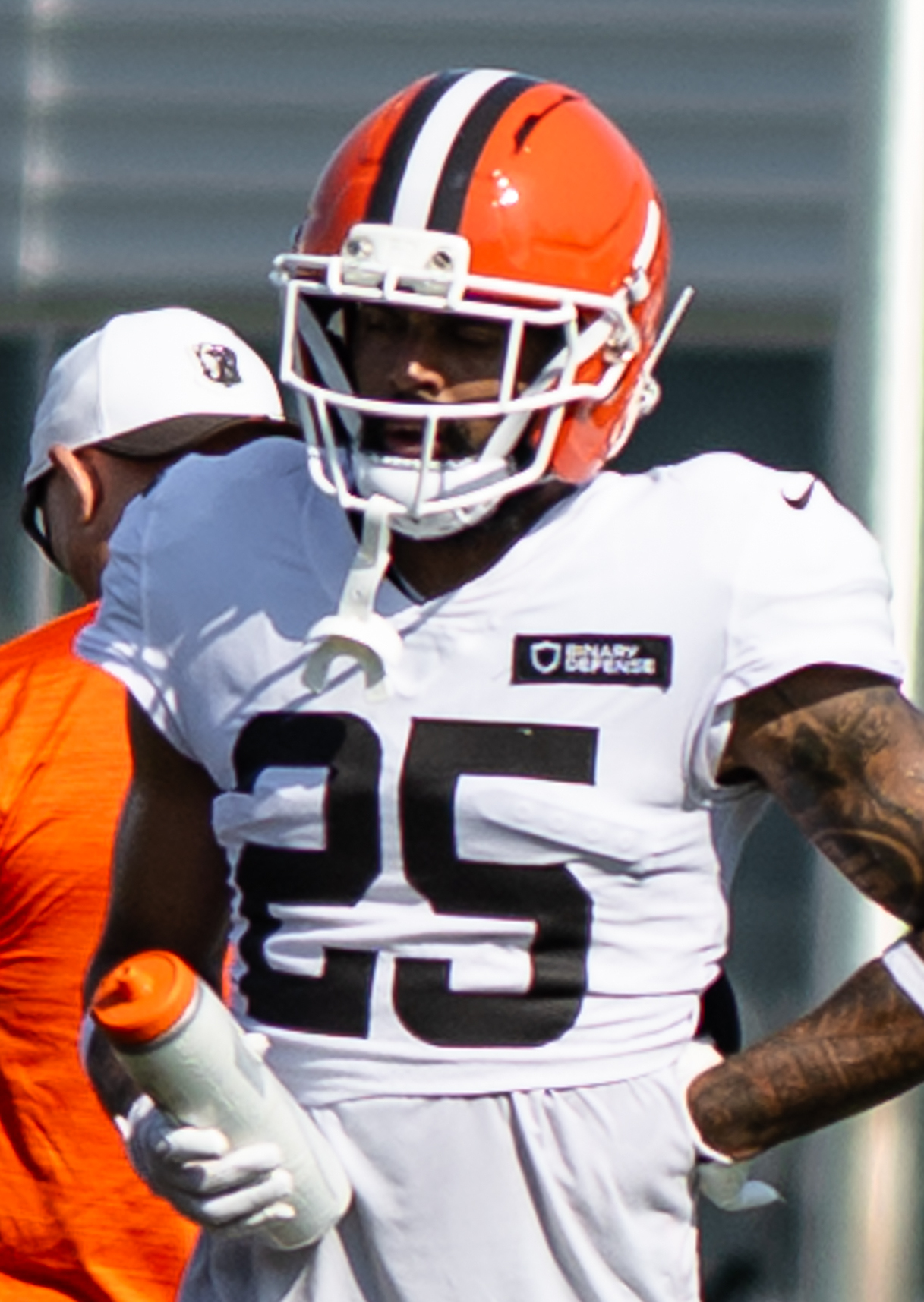
- Needham with the Cleveland Browns in 2025

Profile
- Position: Cornerback

Personal information
- Born: November 4, 1996 (age 30); Long Beach, California, U.S.
- Listed height: 5 ft 11 in (1.80 m)
- Listed weight: 193 lb (88 kg)

Career information
- High school: Buena Park (Buena Park, California)
- College: UTEP (2014–2018)
- NFL draft: 2019: undrafted

Career history
- Miami Dolphins (2019–2024); Cleveland Browns (2025)*; New York Jets (2025)
- * Offseason or practice squad member only

Career NFL statistics as of 2024
- Total tackles: 200
- Sacks: 3.0
- Forced fumbles: 1
- Fumble recoveries: 1
- Pass deflections: 25
- Interceptions: 6
- Defensive touchdowns: 1
- Stats at Pro Football Reference

Nikolas James Needham (born November 4, 1996) is an American professional football cornerback. He played college football for the UTEP Miners.

== Early life ==
Needham attended Buena Park High School in Buena Park, California where he played football. He was the 2013 first team All-Freeway League honoree. He played defensive back and wide receiver during the 2013 season. He averaged 87.7 yards per game. He was a two-star recruit on Scout.com and ranked 74th cornerback in the nation on 247Sports.

== College career ==
Needham was a member of the UTEP Miners for five seasons, redshirting his freshman season. He finished his collegiate career with 213 tackles, 13.5 tackles for loss and three interceptions and a school record 33 passes broken up in 41 games played.

== Professional career ==
Pre-draft measurables
Height	Weight	Arm length	Hand span	40-yard dash	10-yard split	20-yard split	20-yard shuttle	Three-cone drill	Vertical jump	Broad jump	Bench press
5 ft 11 1/4 in (1.81 m)	194 lb (88 kg)	30 3/4 in (0.78 m)	8 1/2 in (0.22 m)	4.67 s	1.64 s	2.63 s	4.20 s	6.90 s	30.5 in (0.77 m)	9 ft 7 in (2.92 m)	10 reps
All values from Pro Day

=== Miami Dolphins ===
Needham signed with the Miami Dolphins as an undrafted free agent on April 28, 2019. He was waived on August 31 as part of final roster cuts but was resigned to the team's practice squad the following day. Needham was promoted to the active roster on October 12 and made his NFL debut the next day against the Washington Redskins, starting at cornerback and finishing the game with one tackle and a pass defended. In Week 9 against the New York Jets, Needham recorded a team-high 9 tackles and sacked Sam Darnold once in the 26–18 win. Needham recorded his first career interception on November 10 against the Indianapolis Colts, picking off a pass from Brian Hoyer in the fourth quarter of the Dolphins' 16–12 win. In Week 15 against the New York Giants, Needham intercepted a pass thrown by Eli Manning during the 36–20 loss. He finished his rookie season with 54 tackles, a sack, one forced fumble and a team-high 11 passes defended with two interceptions in 12 games played.

In Week 10 of the 2020 season against the Los Angeles Chargers, Needham recorded his first sack of the season on Justin Herbert during the 29–21 win.

Needham was given an exclusive-rights free agent tender by the Dolphins on March 8, 2021. He signed the one-year contract on April 19. On December 27, Needham recorded his first defensive touchdown in a game against the New Orleans Saints off quarterback Ian Book in the 20–3 win.

On March 11, 2022, the Dolphins placed a second-round restricted free agent tender on Needham.

On October 19, 2022, the Dolphins placed Needham on injured reserve with a torn Achilles tendon.

On March 17, 2023, Needham re-signed with the Dolphins. Due to his torn achilles from last season, Needham was placed on the reserve/physically unable to perform list to start the 2023 season. He was activated on October 24.

On March 10, 2024, Needham re-signed with the Dolphins. He was released on August 27, and re-signed to the practice squad.

=== Cleveland Browns ===
On April 22, 2025, Needham signed with the Cleveland Browns. He was released on August 24.

=== New York Jets ===
On September 16, 2025, Needham signed with the New York Jets' practice squad.

== Personal life ==
Needham is the son of Steve Calhoun and Shannon Needham. He is an only child.
