= Myron Tagovailoa-Amosa =

American football player (born 1999)

Notre Dame Fighting Irish
- Title: Director of recruiting advancement

Personal information
- Born: May 9, 1999 (age 27); Ewa Beach, Hawaii, U.S.
- Listed height: 6 ft 2 in (1.88 m)
- Listed weight: 268 lb (122 kg)

Career information
- High school: Kapolei (Kapolei, Hawaii)
- College: Notre Dame (2017–2021)
- NFL draft: 2022: undrafted

Career history

Playing
- Las Vegas Raiders (2022)*
- * Offseason or practice squad member only

Coaching
- LSU (2024) Defensive graduate assistant; Notre Dame (2025–present) Director of recruiting advancement

Awards and highlights
- Second-team All-ACC (2020)
- Stats at Pro Football Reference

Myron Seumaninoa Tagovailoa-Amosa (born May 9, 1999) is an American football defensive end who is currently the director of recruiting advancement for the Notre Dame Fighting Irish. He played college football for the Notre Dame Fighting Irish.

== Early life ==
Tagovailoa-Amosa, originally from Ewa Beach, Hawaii, was a standout athlete at Kapolei High School. His quality on the football field, combined with his physical characteristics (about 120 kilos in weight and 189 centimeters in height), attracted the attention of many colleges. He earned scholarship offers from: Vanderbilt, Hawaii, Oregon State, Navy, Utah State, Army, Air Force, Georgia Tech, Virginia, USC, Oregon and Washington to play for their football teams. In 2017 Tagovailoa-Amosa committed to play at Notre Dame.

== College career ==
In his first season with Notre Dame, Tagovailoa-Amosa played in all 13 games in a reserve role. During his second season in South Bend, Tagovailoa-Amosa was limited to two games due with a foot injury that forced him to miss the majority of the season. This also meant that Tagovailoa-Amosa missed the only opportunity to clash on the field with his brother Adam in the scheduled match that year against the Naval Academy. From the 2019 season Tagovailoa-Amosa was a regular starter and played all the matches. In 2021, he was named team captain.

On December 29, 2021, Tagovailoa-Amosa was invited to participate in the East–West Shrine Bowl, an all-star college football game played on February 3, 2022 at Allegiant Stadium in Las Vegas, in which he played as a starter in the defense of the team West.

On January 9, 2022, Tagovailoa-Amosa declared himself eligible for the 2022 NFL draft, forgoing the additional year of college football afforded to athletes who played the COVID-19 shortened 2020 season.

=== College statistics ===
Season	Team	Games		Defense						
Season	Team	GP	GS	Int	Yds	Avg	TD	Solo	Ast	Tot
2017	Notre Dame	**12**	0	0	0	0.0	0	7	6	13
2018	Notre Dame	2	0	0	0	0.0	0	0	2	2
2019	Notre Dame	**12**	**12**	0	0	0.0	0	13	**9**	22
2020	Notre Dame	11	9	0	0	0.0	0	11	6	17
2021	Notre Dame	**12**	**12**	0	0	0.0	0	**18**	8	**26**
Career		49	33	0	0	0.0	0	49	31	80

Career personal bests are in bold

== Professional career ==
Pre-draft measurables
Height	Weight	Arm length	Hand span	Wingspan	40-yard dash	10-yard split	20-yard split	20-yard shuttle	Three-cone drill	Vertical jump	Broad jump
6 ft 2 1/4 in (1.89 m)	270 lb (122 kg)	32 5/8 in (0.83 m)	9 5/8 in (0.24 m)	6 ft 6 7/8 in (2.00 m)	4.81 s	1.71 s	2.83 s	4.75 s	4.86 s	29.5 in (0.75 m)	9 ft 7 in (2.92 m)
All values from NFL Scouting Combine/Pro Day

=== Las Vegas Raiders ===
Tagovailoa-Amosa was not chosen during the 2022 NFL draft. On May 12, 2022, he signed a one-year, $207,000 contract with the Las Vegas Raiders as an undrafted free agent. On August 30, 2022, Tagovailoa-Amosa did not return to the active roster and was released by the Raiders before signing with the practice squad the following day. On November 3, he was placed on the injured list, ending his rookie season prematurely.

== Coaching career ==
On July 9, 2024, Tagovailoa-Amosa was hired to join the coaching staff for the LSU Tigers as a defensive graduate assistant.

== Personal life ==
Tagovailoa-Amosa is a first cousin of Miami Dolphins quarterback and former Alabama quarterback Tua Tagovailoa, while his older brother Adam Amosa-Tagovailoa played as an offensive tackle for the Navy Midshipmen. The difference in the surname with his brother Adam is the result of the profound attachment to the Samoan roots of their family: they are both sons of Tulileie and Saipeti Amora, with their mother, daughter of the great chief Seu Tagovailoa, who wanted one of her nephews to carry on the name of their own family and so it was that Myron already had a double surname at birth, unlike his brother Adam who only had his father's (Amosa). When Seu Tagovailoa died in 2014, his mother Saiupeti wanted all her children to have their grandfather's surname and so Adam also changed his to Amosa-Tagovailoa.
