= Buena Park High School =

American public high school

Coordinates: 33°51′45″N 117°58′42″W

- Mascot

Location
- 8833 Academy Drive; Buena Park, California 90621; United States

Information
- Type: Public
- Established: September 11, 1956
- School board: Fullerton Joint Union High School District
- Principal: Sonje Berg
- Teaching staff: 71.32 (FTE)
- Grades: 9–12
- Enrollment: 1,726 (2023-2024)
- Student to teacher ratio: 24.20
- Colors: Forest Green, White, Black and Grey
- Athletics: 15 sports
- Mascot: Coyote
- Website: www.buenaparkhs.org

Buena Park High School (BPHS) is a public high school located at 8833 Academy Drive in Buena Park, Orange County, California, USA. It is a part of the Fullerton Joint Union High School District.

== History ==
Buena Park High School opened its doors with 508 students on September 11, 1956, as the third school in the Fullerton Joint Union High School District. The school was made possible by a bond issue voted by citizens in the FJUHSD to serve students in Buena Park and west Fullerton.

Under the leadership of its first principal, Richard Spaulding, the enrollment increased to 2,900. John Machisic succeeded Spaulding in 1974, and served in that capacity until 1975. The BPHS student body recognized Richard Spaulding for his many years of service as principal by renaming the football stadium in his honor. Jack Holm followed Machisic for the next seven years until 1983, when Jim Bremer, a BPHS graduate (1960) began his tenure at Buena Park. George Giokaris assumed the responsibilities of principal from 1987 to 1989; Christine Hoffman served from 1989 to 1992; and Tom Triggs served from 1992 to 1998. Michael Conroy served from 1998 to 2001. Maggie Buchan served from 2001 to 2006. Benjamin Wolf served from 2006 to 2009. Jim Coombs served as principal from the summer of 2010 until Sonje Berg took office January 3, 2017.

Since 1967, Buena Park High School has undergone the accreditation process eight times. Most recently, the school went through the process in 2016-2017. Under the supervision of the Western Association of Schools and colleges, an intensive review was completed of every facet of the school's operation. A full six-year accreditation was awarded to Buena Park High School which certifies to all other educational institutions that the high school meets all standards set for high quality schools and that credits and grades earned by its graduates are based on quality criteria.

== Athletics ==
Buena Park's sports teams are known as the Coyotes, and are members of the CIF Southern Section. They compete in most sports in the Freeway League against the other five high schools in the FJUHSD. Cross country is also one of the most winning sports at Buena Park, followed by wrestling, water polo, and football. The cross country team advanced to CIF for the first time in almost 20 years under the leadership of Barry Migliorini. The cross country team swept the Freeway League titles for the Frosh off and JV levels, varsity came in second losing to Troy High School. In 2011, they won the league title and went on to the CIF SS finals and one individual boy, Gilberto Solorza, advancing to the state finals in cross country. In 2019, the cross country team would make their 18th appearance at the CIF Southern Section finals. As for the women's cross country team, this would mark their third CIF appearance since 1997.

In 2001, the football team made it to the CIF-SS Division IX Championship game and lost to Brea Olinda. In 2016, the varsity football team went unbeaten and untied in the Freeway League for the first and only time in school history and went on to CIF, capping a string of seven straight winning seasons under head coach Anthony White.

In 2008, the boys water polo team placed second in the Freeway League and advanced to the CIF-SS quarterfinals, and in 2022 advanced to the semifinal round. In 2019, the girls water polo won the CIF-SS Division 6 title, the first team title in school history.

The 2009 Girls' Varsity Tennis team advanced to CIF for the first time in BPHS history.

== Notable alumni ==
- Ed Amelung — Baseball player for the Los Angeles Dodgers
- Harry Anderson — Actor, comedian, and magician (known for Night Court)
- Nathan Baesel – Actor
- John Beasley — Football player for the Minnesota Vikings
- Jaylinn Hawkins — Football player for the New England Patriots
- Nik Needham — Football player for the New York Jets
- Francisco "Cisco" Rivera — professional Mixed Martial Arts
- Dave Rowland — Lead singer of the band Dave & Sugar
- Steven Seagal — Actor, producer, writer and director
- Josh Tupou — Football player for the Baltimore Ravens
- Zac Zorn — Freestyle swimming world record holder and Olympic gold medalist (1968)
