= Tua Tagovailoa =

American football player (born 1998)

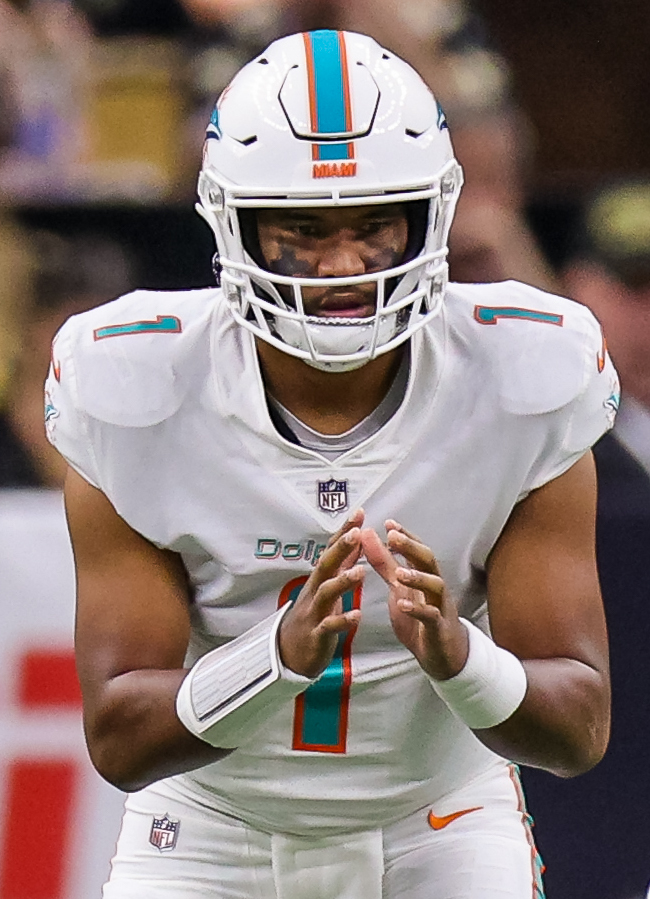
- Tagovailoa with the Miami Dolphins in 2021

No. 1 – Atlanta Falcons
- Position: Quarterback
- Roster status: Active

Personal information
- Born: March 2, 1998 (age 28) ʻEwa Beach, Hawaii, U.S.
- Listed height: 6 ft 1 in (1.85 m)
- Listed weight: 225 lb (102 kg)

Career information
- High school: Saint Louis (Honolulu, Hawaii)
- College: Alabama (2017–2019)
- NFL draft: 2020: 1st round, 5th overall pick

Career history
- Miami Dolphins (2020–2025); Atlanta Falcons (2026–present)

Awards and highlights
- Pro Bowl (2023); NFL passing yards leader (2023); NFL passer rating leader (2022); NFL completion percentage leader (2024); CFP national champion (2017); CFP National Championship Game Offensive MVP (2018); Maxwell Award (2018); Walter Camp Award (2018); Sporting News College Football Player of the Year (2018); Consensus All-American (2018); NCAA passer rating leader (2018); SEC Offensive Player of the Year (2018); First-team All-SEC (2018); Second-team All-SEC (2019); NCAA (FBS) record: Career passer rating: 199.4

Career NFL statistics as of Week 5, 2026
- Passing attempts: 2,424
- Passing completions: 1,649
- Completion percentage: 68.0%
- TD–INT: 120–60
- Passing yards: 18,200
- Passer rating: 96.2
- Rushing yards: 473
- Rushing touchdowns: 6
- Stats at Pro Football Reference

Tuanigamanuolepola Donny Tagovailoa (/ˌtʌŋoʊvaɪˈloʊə/ TUNG-oh-vy-LOH-ə; born March 2, 1998) is an American professional football quarterback for the Atlanta Falcons of the National Football League (NFL). He played college football for the Alabama Crimson Tide and was named the Offensive MVP of the 2018 College Football Playoff National Championship during his freshman season. As a sophomore, Tagovailoa won the Maxwell and Walter Camp awards en route to an appearance in the 2019 National Championship.

After his junior season was cut short by a hip injury, Tagovailoa was selected fifth overall by the Miami Dolphins in the 2020 NFL draft. He spent his rookie season alternating as a backup and starter before becoming the team's primary starter in 2021. Tagovailoa led the league in passer rating in 2022 and passing yards in 2023, earning Pro Bowl honors in the latter, and helping the Dolphins qualify for the playoffs both seasons. Due to injuries and a performance decline, Tagovailoa was released by Miami after the 2025 season and signed with the Falcons. He ranks third all-time in completion percentage with at least 1,500 pass attempts.

== Early life ==
Tagovailoa was born in ʻEwa Beach, Hawaii, to Galu and Diane Tagovailoa, as the oldest of four children in a Samoan family. He was said to have grown up with an intense interest in football, with his parents noting that he slept with a football under his arm every night as a small child. During Pop Warner games when he was eight years old, when his peers could typically throw a football little more than 10 yards, he routinely threw passes of more than 30 yards.

As a child, his main inspiration was his grandfather Seu Tagovailoa. He was highly respected in the local Samoan community and was regularly addressed as "Chief Tagovailoa". Seu believed that Tagovailoa would eventually grow into a football star and he requested that he visit him after every game to report his progress. Tagovailoa briefly considered quitting the sport after Seu's death in 2014 until he and his father agreed that he could best honor him by continuing to play.

Tagovailoa attended Saint Louis School in Honolulu, the same school as 2014 Heisman Trophy winner Marcus Mariota, where Mariota served as a mentor to him when they were growing up in Hawaii. As a high school varsity player, Tagovailoa threw for 33 passing touchdowns during his first season with three interceptions and 2,583 passing yards. Tagovailoa said his father pressured him to perform in high school, and would beat him with a belt if he threw an interception. In 2016, Tagovailoa played in the All-American Bowl, and in his regular season threw for 2,669 passing yards with 27 passing touchdowns and seven interceptions. He was also chosen to be a part of the Elite 11 roster as one of the top high school quarterbacks in the nation, where he was named MVP of that roster. Throughout his career, fans and announcers alike had difficulty pronouncing Tagovailoa's name. He educated people on his culture by teaching them the correct pronunciation.

Tagovailoa was deemed a four-star recruit during the 2017 recruiting cycle and was ranked the top high school prospect in the state of Hawaii. He had 17 offers to play on a college football scholarship before eventually enrolling at the University of Alabama in January 2017. Tagovailoa likened Alabama's hospitality to Hawaii's when picking the school, and credits Alabama's church-going culture for making it feel more similar to his home state. Tagovailoa's 'pastor dad' also had a vision that he would go on to play at Alabama, despite the lack of recruitment out of Hawaii by the school.

College recruiting
Name	Hometown	School	Height	Weight	Commit date
Tua Tagovailoa; QB	Honolulu, Hawaii	St. Louis School	6 ft 1 in (1.85 m)	212 lb (96 kg)	May 2, 2016
Tua Tagovailoa; QB	Recruit ratings: Rivals: 247Sports: ESPN:				
Overall recruit ranking: Rivals: 53 (#3 QB, #1 HI) 247Sports: 22 (#1 QB, #1 HI) ESPN: 57 (#1 QB, #1 HI)
Note: In many cases, Scout, Rivals, 247Sports, On3, and ESPN may conflict in their listings of height and weight.; In these cases, the average was taken. ESPN grades are on a 100-point scale.; Sources: "2017 Team Ranking". Rivals.com.

== College career ==
=== 2017 season ===
As a true freshman, Tagovailoa was the backup to sophomore quarterback Jalen Hurts throughout the 2017 season. However, he received significant playing time due to a couple of blowout victories for the Crimson Tide. On September 9, he made his collegiate debut against Fresno State in a home game at Bryant–Denny Stadium. In the 41–10 victory, he finished 6-of-9 for 64 yards and his first career passing touchdown, which was a 16-yard pass to wide receiver Henry Ruggs. On September 23, in a 59–0 victory against Vanderbilt, he got more playing time and recorded 103 passing yards and two passing touchdowns. In the next game, against SEC West rival Ole Miss, he recorded his first collegiate rushing touchdown in a 66–3 victory. In the annual rivalry game against Tennessee, he finished with 134 passing yards, one passing touchdown, one interception, and one rushing touchdown in the 45–7 victory. On November 18, in a game against Mercer, he threw for three passing touchdowns in the 56–0 victory. On January 8, 2018, he replaced Hurts in the second half of the 2018 College Football Playoff National Championship due to ineffective play by Hurts. He threw the game-winning 41-yard touchdown pass in overtime to another true freshman, wide receiver DeVonta Smith as Alabama defeated Georgia, 26–23, claiming their 17th National Championship. He finished the game 14-of-24 for 166 passing yards, three passing touchdowns and one interception, along with 27 rushing yards on 12 attempts. Tagovailoa was named the Offensive MVP of the game. After winning the National Championship, Tagovailoa emphasized how important it was to him to make his home state of Hawaii proud of his success on the football field.

=== 2018 season ===
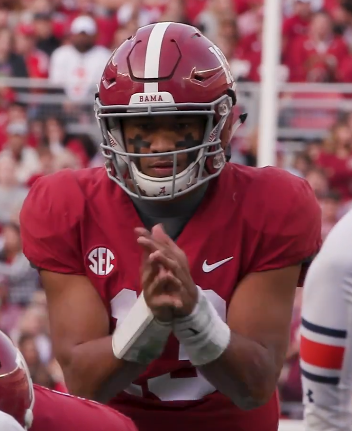
Tagovailoa with Alabama in 2018.

On September 1, 2018, Tagovailoa made his first career start at the season's opening game, against Louisville, in Orlando, Florida. He finished 12-of-16, with 227 passing yards and two touchdowns in the 51–14 victory, before Jalen Hurts replaced him in the third quarter. During Alabama head coach Nick Saban's weekly Monday press conference following the victory, he announced Tagovailoa as the starter for the Crimson Tide's home opener against Arkansas State on September 8. In the 62–7 victory over Ole Miss, he was 11-of-15 for 191 passing yards and two touchdowns to go along with 47 rushing yards. He continued his efficient season against Texas A&M with 387 passing yards, four passing touchdowns, and a rushing touchdown in the 45–23 victory. In a limited role against Louisiana, he was 8-of-8 passing for 128 passing yards and two passing touchdowns in the 56–14 victory. In the next game against Arkansas, he had more passing touchdowns than incompletions as he went 10-of-13 for 334 passing yards and four passing touchdowns in the 65–31 victory. Following the regular season, he finished second in the Heisman Trophy voting to Oklahoma quarterback Kyler Murray, but he won the Walter Camp Award and Maxwell Award for 2018, both awarded to the top player in college football. While recovering from the high ankle sprain he suffered during the SEC Championship against Georgia, Tagovailoa put on a nearly flawless offensive performance against Oklahoma in the 2018 Orange Bowl (24-of-27 with 318 yards passing, four touchdowns and no interceptions) to lead the Tide to their fourth consecutive CFP National Championship appearance. He was also named Offensive MVP of that game. In the 2019 National Championship, Tagovailoa went 22-of-34 with 295 passing yards, two touchdowns and two interceptions in a 44–16 loss to Clemson. He also set a new NCAA FBS passer rating record of 199.4 for the season, surpassing the record 198.9 set by Baker Mayfield in 2017.

=== 2019 season ===
Tagovailoa began his junior season at the Chick-fil-A Kickoff Game with a victory against Duke in Atlanta. He finished 26-of-31 with 336 passing yards and four touchdowns before sitting out the fourth quarter. The second game of the season was a home opener victory against New Mexico State. Tagovailoa finished that game 16-of-24 with 227 passing yards and four total touchdowns before sitting out the fourth quarter. In his third game of the season, a victory against South Carolina, Tagovailoa finished 28-of-36 with 444 passing yards and five touchdowns. In the Tide's 49–7 victory against Southern Miss, Tagovailoa finished 17-of-21 with 293 passing yards and five touchdowns. In the Tide's fifth game, a victory against Ole Miss, Tagovailoa finished 26-of-36 with 418 passing yards and seven total touchdowns. In the Tide's 47–28 victory against Texas A&M, Tagovailoa finished 21-of-34 with 293 passing yards, four touchdowns, and one interception.

Tagovailoa left the Tide's seventh game against Tennessee early in the second quarter after suffering a high ankle sprain. He underwent surgery to repair the ankle the following day, and did not play in the next game against Arkansas (a 48–7 victory led by quarterback Mac Jones). Tagovailoa returned three weeks post-surgery to play in the 46–41 loss to top-ranked LSU. Despite some struggles (a fumble and INT) in the first half of that game, Tagovailoa rebounded after halftime to finish 21-of-40 with 413 passing yards, four touchdowns, and one interception.

In the Tide's matchup against Mississippi State, Tagovailoa led the team to a 35–7 lead (14-of-18, 256 passing yards, two touchdowns) before leaving the game after a sack that saw his knee driven into the ground, causing his hip to dislocate and fracturing the posterior wall of his acetabulum, as well as suffering a broken nose and concussion. He was carted off the field and flown to a Birmingham hospital before undergoing surgery in Houston two days later.

In January 2020, Tagovailoa announced that he would forgo his senior year and enter the 2020 NFL draft. Tagovailoa finished his collegiate career as holder of numerous Alabama football records, as well as notable NCAA career records, including: passing yards per attempt (10.9), adjusted passing yards per attempt (12.7), passing efficiency rating (199.4), and total yards per play (9.8). He graduated with a bachelor's degree in communication studies in August 2020.

== Professional career ==
Pre-draft measurables
Height	Weight	Arm length	Hand span	Wingspan	Wonderlic
6 ft 0 in (1.83 m)	217 lb (98 kg)	30 1/2 in (0.77 m)	10 in (0.25 m)	6 ft 3 1/4 in (1.91 m)	19
All values from NFL Combine

=== Miami Dolphins ===
Tagovailoa was projected to be taken first overall in the 2020 NFL draft until his season-ending injury led to LSU quarterback and 2019 Heisman Trophy winner Joe Burrow supplanting him as the draft's top prospect. Despite injury concerns, however, Tagovailoa was selected fifth overall by the Miami Dolphins. Tagovailoa was also the first left-handed quarterback to be drafted by an NFL team since Tim Tebow in 2010. Because his college jersey number of 13 was retired by the Dolphins in honor of Dan Marino, Tagovailoa chose to wear number 1.

==== 2020 season ====
Tagovailoa signed his four-year rookie contract, worth $30 million, on May 11, 2020. He passed his physical with the team in July 2020 to begin training camp, but was named the backup to Ryan Fitzpatrick to start the season.

Tagovailoa made his debut appearance in a Week 6 game against the New York Jets, coming in relief of Fitzpatrick in the fourth quarter of a 24–0 win where he threw two passes for nine yards. His NFL appearance was the first for a left-handed quarterback since Kellen Moore in 2015. During the team's bye week, Tagovailoa was named the starter for their Week 8 game against the Los Angeles Rams. On Tagovailoa's first career pass attempt as a starter, he was strip-sacked by Aaron Donald. Later in the game, Tagovailoa recorded his first career touchdown on a pass thrown to DeVante Parker. In Week 11 against the Denver Broncos, Tagovailoa threw for 83 yards and a touchdown before being replaced by Fitzpatrick early in the fourth quarter with the Broncos leading 20–10. Tagovailoa jammed his thumb in practice prior to a Week 12 game against the Jets and missed the game. He made his return in Week 13 against the Cincinnati Bengals, where he threw for 296 yards and a touchdown during a 19–7 win. In Week 14 during a narrow 33–27 defeat against the Kansas City Chiefs, Tagovailoa eclipsed the 300 passing yard mark in the NFL for the first time by passing for 316 yards and two touchdowns, plus with an additional rushing touchdown. His performance earned him Pepsi NFL Rookie of the Week honors for back-to-back weeks. In Week 16 against the Las Vegas Raiders, Tagovailoa threw for 94 yards and a touchdown before being benched in favor of Fitzpatrick again in the fourth quarter. In Week 17 against the Buffalo Bills, needing a win for the Dolphins to qualify for the playoffs, Tagovailoa threw for a career-high 361 yards, one touchdown, and three interceptions as Miami lost 56–26. The Dolphins missed the playoffs for the fourth consecutive year, and for the 17th time in the 21 seasons since the retirement of Dan Marino.

==== 2021 season ====
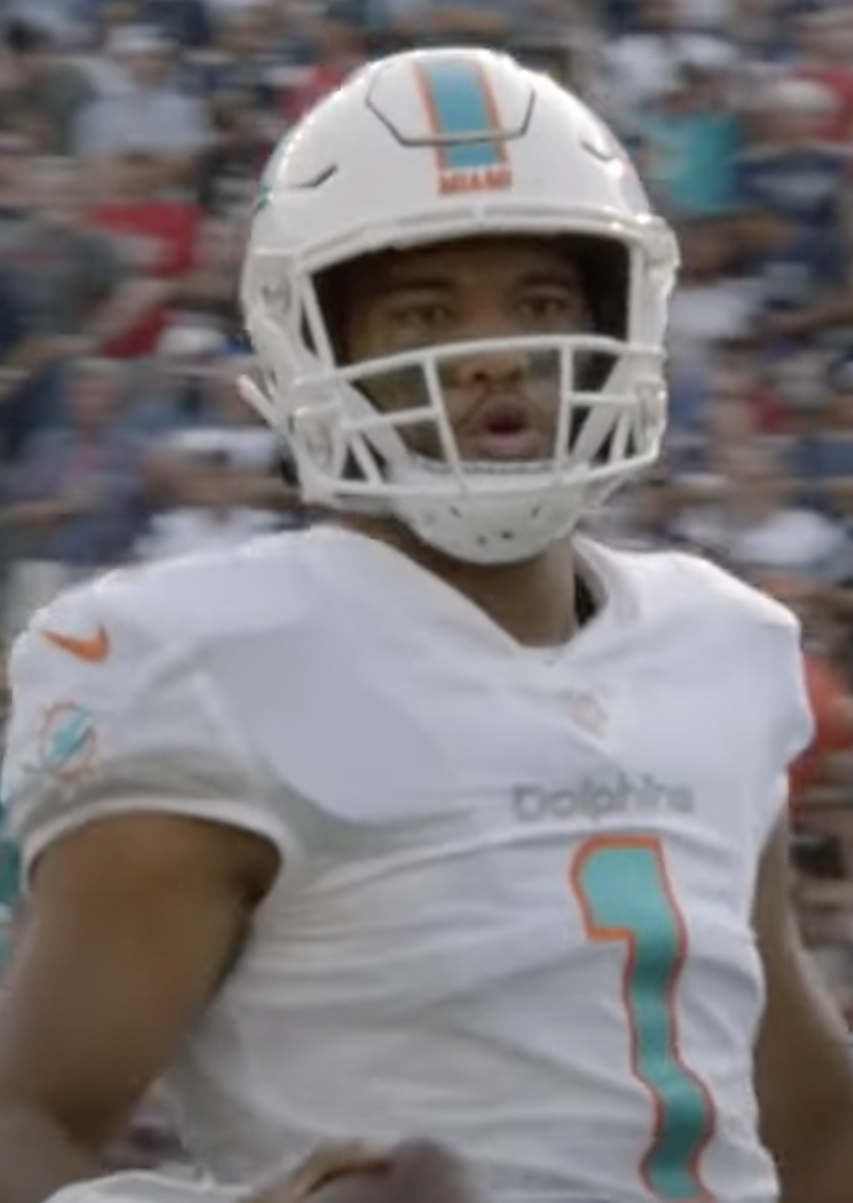
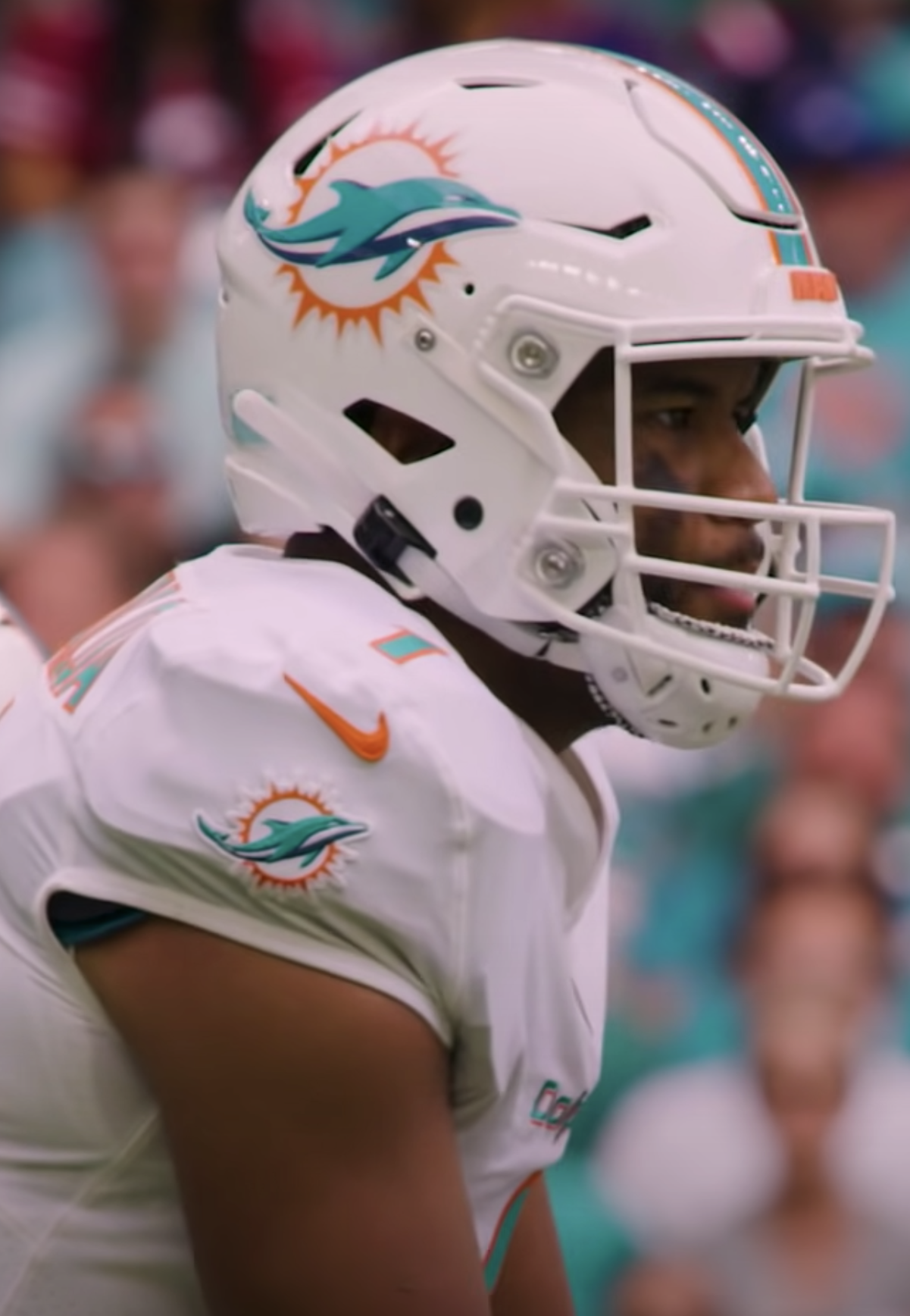
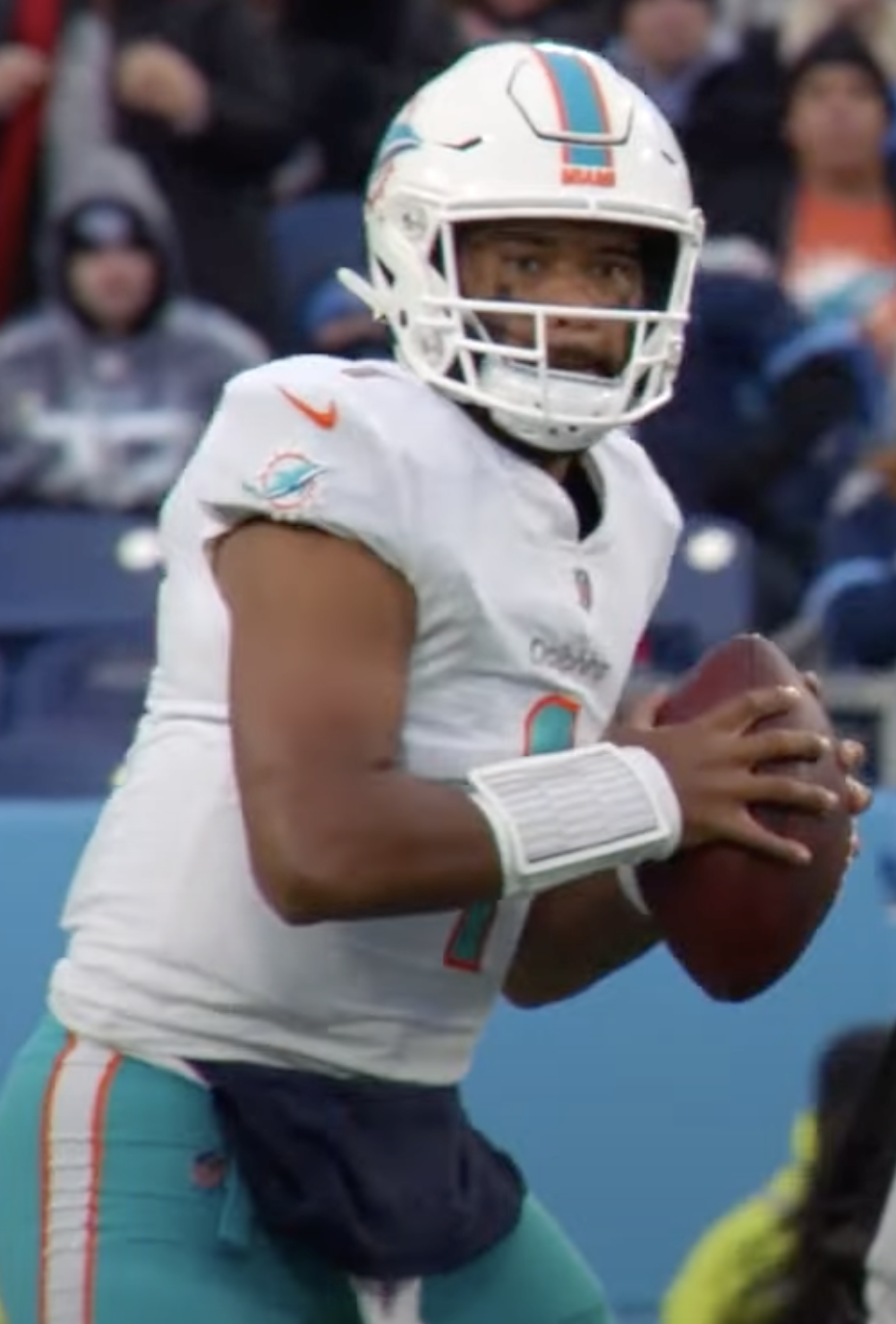
Tagovailoa in the 2021 NFL season: against the Patriots (left), against the Falcons (center) and against the Titans (right)

Tagovailoa led the Dolphins to a Week 1 win over the New England Patriots, their divisional rivals. During Week 2 against the Bills, Tagovailoa suffered a rib injury early in the game, and was carted off the field on a motorized stretcher, not returning in that game. Tagovailoa was later ruled out for the Dolphins Week 3 matchup against the Raiders, as it was revealed that he had fractured several ribs. He was then placed on injured reserve on September 25, 2021, and returned from injury in Week 6 against the Jacksonville Jaguars in London. In his first game in nearly a month, Tagovailoa completed 33 of 47 passes for 329 yards, two touchdowns and an interception in a 23–20 loss to the Jaguars, dropping the Dolphins' record to 1–5. The Dolphins lost two additional games to the Atlanta Falcons and Bills to drop their record to 1–7. The following week, Tagovailoa missed the Dolphins' Week 9 game against the Houston Texans, as the Dolphins won 17–9.

In their next game against the Baltimore Ravens, Tagovailoa came off the bench to energize the Dolphins, completing 8 of 13 passes for 158 yards and a rushing touchdown, resulting in an upset 22–10 victory. Tagovailoa used the win to catapult a turnaround in his and his team's fortunes. The following week set the tone for the rest of the season, as he completed 27 of 33 passes for 273 yards, two touchdowns and an interception as the Dolphins beat the Jets 24–17. He led the team to its first seven-game winning streak since 1985. During their 20–9 victory over the New York Giants in Week 13, he became the first Dolphins quarterback since Dan Marino in 1994 to throw at least 21 completions in the first half of a game. In Week 17 against the Tennessee Titans, Tagovailoa and the Dolphins were blown out 34–3. Following their loss, and with the Los Angeles Chargers defeating the Broncos, the Dolphins were eliminated from playoff contention for the fifth consecutive year, and 18th time in 20 seasons. In the final game of the 2021 season, Tagovailoa led the Dolphins to their first sweep of the rival Patriots since 2000, making him 3–0 against Bill Belichick and the Patriots in his career. He finished the 2021 season with 2,653 passing yards, 16 passing touchdowns, and ten interceptions to go along with 42 carries for 128 rushing yards and three rushing touchdowns in 13 games.

==== 2022 season ====
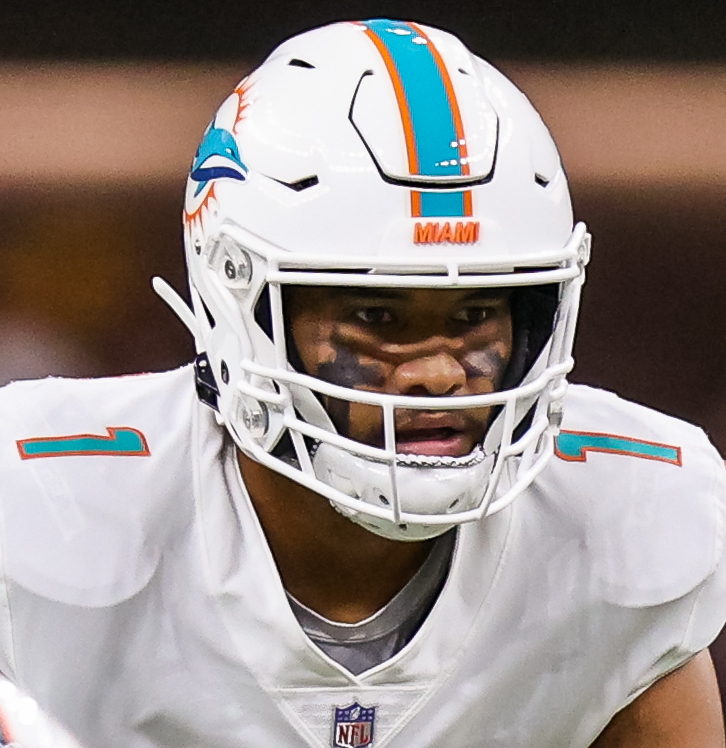
Tagovailoa in a game against New Orleans Saints

During the offseason previous to the 2022 season, the Miami Dolphins fired head coach Brian Flores, arguing internal communication issues. A few weeks later, several sources confirmed differences between Tagovailoa and Flores with rumors of heavy discussions between them. The Dolphins hired Mike McDaniel as their head coach on February 6, 2022, who expressed unbridled support for Tagovailoa as his starting quarterback.

Tagovailoa began his third season by throwing for 270 yards and a touchdown in a 20–7 win over the Patriots, improving to 4–0 against Bill Belichick and the Patriots. The next week against the Ravens, Tagovailoa threw for a career-high 469 yards, six touchdowns, and two interceptions in the 42–38 comeback win. The 21-point comeback was the first fourth-quarter comeback of 21+ points in 12 years. Prior to the game, teams were 0–711 when trailing by at least 21 points in the fourth quarter since 2011. His six-touchdown performance also tied the Dolphins franchise record, tying Hall of Famers Bob Griese and Dan Marino, and his 469 passing yards ranks fourth in franchise history. As a result of his historic performance, Tagovailoa was named American Football Conference (AFC) Offensive Player of the Week for Week 2. During Week 3 against the Bills, Tagovailoa briefly left the game with what the Dolphins claimed was a back injury but eventually returned to the game, finishing with 186 passing yards and a touchdown as the Dolphins won 21–19. After the game, the NFLPA suspected that the Dolphins might have violated concussion protocols by letting Tagovailoa back in the game and subsequently announced that an investigation would be launched. After being a game-time decision for Week 4, Tagovailoa was cleared to start against the Bengals. After taking a sack by Bengals nose tackle Josh Tupou during the second quarter, Tagovailoa hit the ground with his left elbow, back and back of his helmet. Tagovailoa demonstrated a fencing response and was stretchered off the field and transported to the University of Cincinnati Medical Center with head and neck injuries. He was discharged from the hospital later that night. Two days later, the NFL players' union fired their independent neurotrauma consultant who was involved in Tagovailoa's concussion check during the Bills game. Tagovailoa's suspected concussion resulted in the NFL and NFLPA revising its concussion protocol policy. Tagovailoa returned to practice on October 12, but remained in concussion protocol.

On October 15, Tagovailoa cleared concussion protocol, but remained inactive for the Week 6 game against the Minnesota Vikings. Tagovailoa returned in Week 7 against the Pittsburgh Steelers, where he threw for 261 yards and a touchdown in the 16–10 win. The next week against the Detroit Lions, Tagovailoa threw for 382 yards and three touchdowns while completing 80% of his passes in the 31–27 win. On December 21, despite topping the overall fan votes (306,861) for the 2023 Pro Bowl, Tagovailoa was not selected to the Pro Bowl. Against the Green Bay Packers on Christmas Day, Tagovailoa threw for 310 yards, and a touchdown, but threw three interceptions in the fourth quarter, including the game-losing one to Rasul Douglas in the 26–20 loss. The next day, it was announced that Tagovailoa had entered concussion protocol after he was experiencing concussion symptoms he suffered in the game. On December 28, McDaniel confirmed Tagovailoa suffered a concussion and was ruled out for the Dolphins Week 17 game against the Patriots, and then also ruled out for the season finale against the Jets. On January 9, the Dolphins clinched the AFC's final playoff berth, and their first since 2016. On January 11, McDaniel said that Tagovailoa had not been cleared to return to practice since he entered concussion protocol a second time, and was ruled out for his third consecutive game.

Tagovailoa finished the regular season throwing for 3,548 yards, 25 touchdowns, and eight interceptions, going 8–5 in 13 games played. Tagovailoa also led the league in passer rating and passing average. He was ranked 82nd by his fellow players on the NFL Top 100 Players of 2023.

==== 2023 season ====
On March 20, 2023, the Dolphins picked up the fifth-year option of Tagovailoa's contract. In his first news conference since December 2022, Tagovailoa said that he considered retirement in the off-season due to his injuries in the 2022 season.

Tagovailoa began his fourth season by throwing for 466 yards, three touchdowns, and an interception as the Dolphins won 36–34 against the Chargers. For his performance, Tagovailoa was named AFC Offensive Player of the Week for Week 1. In Week 2, Tagovailoa threw for 249 yards, a touchdown, and an interception in the Dolphins' 24–17 win against the Patriots. During Week 3 against the Broncos, Tagovailoa finished with 309 passing yards and 4 touchdowns. The Dolphins also combined for 350 rushing yards and won 70–20. Tagovailoa's exceptional play in these games earned him AFC Offensive Player of the Month for September. On January 3, 2024, it was announced that Tagovailoa had been selected for his first Pro Bowl appearance. He was named as the starting quarterback of the AFC roster.

Tagovailoa finished the season with a league-leading 4,624 passing yards, becoming the first Dolphins quarterback to lead the league in passing yards since Dan Marino in 1992. Tagovailoa also generated career-highs in passing touchdowns (29), completions (388), and completion percentage (69.3%) in his fourth NFL season. In addition, he started every game in 2023 while staying healthy throughout the season, a career first.

Tagovailoa made his playoff debut against the Chiefs in the Wild Card round, throwing for 199 yards with one touchdown and one interception in a 26–7 loss. He was ranked 36th by his fellow players on the NFL Top 100 Players of 2024.

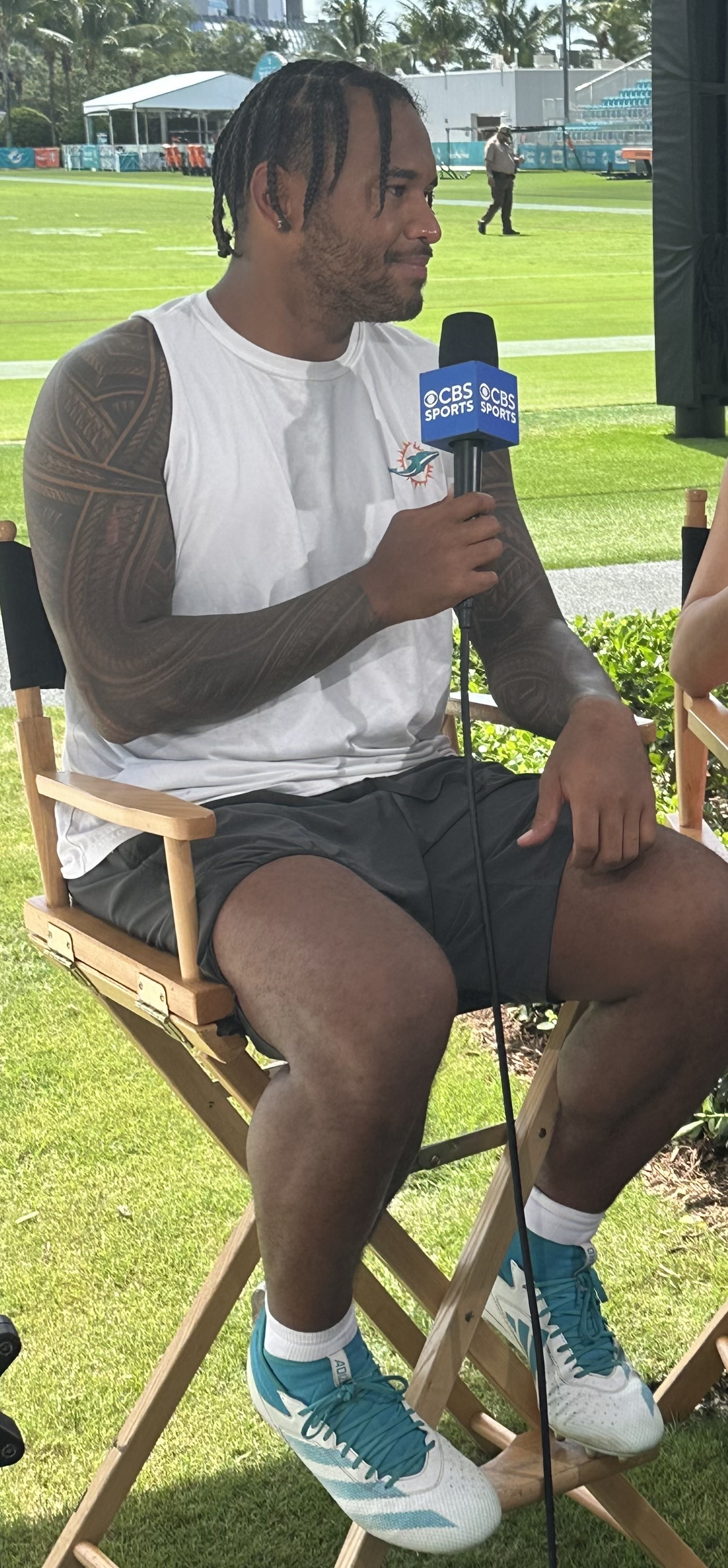
Tua Tagovailoa being interviewed by CBS Sports at Miami Dolphins training camp in July 2025

==== 2024 season ====
On July 26, 2024, Tagovailoa signed a four-year, $212.4 million contract extension, including a $42,000,000 signing bonus, $167,171,000 guaranteed, and an average annual salary of $53,100,000 with the Dolphins. Tagovailoa opened the season against the Jacksonville Jaguars, throwing for 336 yards and leading a game-winning field goal drive. During Thursday Night Football on September 12, Tagovailoa suffered another concussion against the Bills after leading with his helmet into contact with safety Damar Hamlin following a scramble. The Dolphins later placed him on injured reserve following what became his third diagnosed concussion in two years, requiring him to miss at least four games, in order to give him ample time to progress through the NFL's concussion protocol while meeting with independent neurologists. After fulfilling the required four-game absence, Tagovailoa was designated to return to practice on October 21. Head coach Mike McDaniel confirmed that medical experts approved his return, and Tagovailoa stated that he did not consider retirement after the concussion.

On October 27, Tagovailoa made his return in Week 8 against the Arizona Cardinals, completing 28-of-38 passes for 234 yards and a touchdown as the Dolphins lost on a walk-off field goal, dropping their record to 2–5. The following week against the Bills, Tagovailoa completed a career-best 89.3% of his passes (25-of-28) and led a game-tying touchdown drive with under two minutes left, but the Dolphins lost on another last-second field goal. Tagovailoa helped snap a three-game losing streak with timely third-down throws, going 9-of-12 for 137 yards on third down in a 23–15 win over the Los Angeles Rams. He continued his efficient play against the Raiders and Patriots, completing over 70% of his passes for 605 yards, seven touchdowns, and no interceptions across the two games as Miami improved to 5–6. From weeks 12–14, Tagovailoa became the first QB to attempt 40 or more passes, throw multiple touchdowns, pass for more than 300 yards, and record zero interceptions across three games in the same season. This stretch included a game-winning touchdown pass in overtime against the New York Jets. He joined Dan Marino as the only Dolphins quarterback with a 300-yard performance in three consecutive games. On December 22, Tagovailoa threw his 100th career touchdown pass to Tyreek Hill in a 29–17 win against the San Francisco 49ers. He was ranked 91st by his fellow players on the NFL Top 100 Players of 2025. He missed the season's final two games. He finished the 2024 season with 2,867 yards, 19 touchdowns, and seven interceptions in 11 games.

==== 2025 season ====
In the season opener against the Indianapolis Colts, Tagovailoa struggled in the game, throwing for just 114 yards and a touchdown while also committing three turnovers (two interceptions and a fumble) in the 8−33 loss. In Week 8 against the Falcons, he passed for four touchdowns in the 34–10 victory.

In the October 12 home game against the Los Angeles Chargers, he threw three interceptions. In the next game on October 19 at Cleveland, he also threw three interceptions and was benched for rookie Quinn Ewers in the 6–31 loss. In those two games, he threw only one touchdown pass and had a total of 305 passing yards.

On December 17, 2025, Dolphins head coach Mike McDaniel announced that Tagovailoa would be benched for the Week 16 game against the Cincinnati Bengals after the Dolphins had been eliminated from playoff contention following a Week 15 loss to the Pittsburgh Steelers on Monday Night Football, being replaced by Quinn Ewers. At the time of his benching, Tagovailoa was tied with Geno Smith with interceptions thrown with 15. On the season, Tagovailoa passed for 2,660 yards, 20 touchdowns, and 15 interceptions, compiling a starting record of six wins and eight losses.

On March 11, 2026, Tagovailoa was released by the Dolphins, who would take on a record $99.2 million in dead money.

=== Atlanta Falcons ===
On March 13, 2026, Tagovailoa signed a one-year, $1.215 million contract with the Atlanta Falcons. He was named the starting quarterback to begin the 2026 season, but was unable to play after suffering an oblique injury in practice. Cooper Rush started the first two games before Michael Penix Jr. became the starter, after which Tagovailoa was demoted to backup. He made his Falcons debut in overtime during the Falcons' Week 5 game against the Baltimore Ravens after Penix suffered a rib injury late in the fourth quarter. On the second play of the drive, Tagovailoa threw an interception to Kyle Hamilton, sealing the game for the Ravens.

== Career statistics ==
=== NFL ===
Legend
	Led the league
**Bold**	Career high

==== Regular season ====
Year	Team	Games			Passing									Rushing					Sacked		Fumbles	
Year	Team	GP	GS	Record	Cmp	Att	Pct	Yds	Y/A	Lng	TD	Int	Rtg	Att	Yds	Y/A	Lng	TD	Sck	SckY	Fum	Lost
2020	MIA	10	9	6–3	186	290	64.1	1,814	6.3	35	11	5	87.1	36	109	**3.0**	17	**3**	20	136	1	1
2021	MIA	13	12	7–5	263	388	67.8	2,653	6.8	65	16	10	90.1	**42**	**128**	**3.0**	**23**	**3**	20	152	9	1
2022	MIA	13	13	8–5	259	400	64.8	3,548	**8.9**	**84**	25	8	**105.5**	23	70	**3.0**	18	0	21	163	6	1
2023	MIA	17	17	**11–6**	**388**	**560**	69.3	**4,624**	8.3	78	**29**	14	101.1	35	74	2.1	9	0	29	171	**13**	**5**
2024	MIA	11	11	6–5	291	399	**72.9**	2,867	7.2	80	19	7	101.4	17	49	2.9	13	0	21	154	7	2
2025	MIA	14	14	6–8	260	384	67.7	2,660	6.9	47	20	**15**	88.5	20	43	2.2	8	0	**30**	**195**	8	1
2026	ATL	1	0	0–0	2	3	66.7	34	11.3	20	0	1	65.3	0	0	0	0	0	0	0	0	0
Career		79	76	44–32	1,649	2,424	67.6	18,200	7.5	84	120	60	91.3	173	473	2.7	23	6	141	971	44	11

==== Postseason ====
Year	Team	Games			Passing									Rushing					Sacked		Fumbles	
Year	Team	GP	GS	Record	Cmp	Att	Pct	Yds	Y/A	Lng	TD	Int	Rtg	Att	Yds	Y/A	Lng	TD	Sck	SckY	Fum	Lost
2022	MIA	0	0	—	Did not play due to injury																	
2023	MIA	1	1	0–1	20	39	51.3	199	5.1	53	1	1	63.9	3	25	8.3	14	0	2	11	0	0
Career		1	1	0–1	20	39	51.3	199	5.1	53	1	1	63.9	3	25	8.3	14	0	2	11	0	0

=== College ===
Legend
FBS record
Led NCAA Division I FBS

Year	Team	Games			Passing								Rushing			
Year	Team	GP	GS	Record	Cmp	Att	Pct	Yds	Y/A	TD	Int	Rtg	Att	Yds	Avg	TD
2017	Alabama	8	0	—	49	77	63.6	636	8.3	11	2	175.0	27	133	**4.9**	2
2018	Alabama	15	15	**14–1**	**245**	**355**	69.0	**3,966**	11.2	**43**	**6**	199.4	**57**	**190**	3.3	**5**
2019	Alabama	9	9	8–1	180	252	**71.4**	2,840	**11.3**	33	3	**206.9**	23	17	0.7	2
Career		32	24	22–2	474	684	69.3	7,442	10.9	87	11	199.4	107	340	3.2	9

== Career highlights ==
NFL

- Pro Bowl (2023)
- NFL passing yards leader (2023)
- NFL passer rating leader (2022)
- NFL completion percentage leader (2024)
- 2× Polynesian Professional Football Player of the Year (2022, 2023)
- 3× NFL Top 100 — 82nd (2023), 36th (2024), 91st (2025)

College

- CFP national champion (2017)
- CFP National Championship Game Offensive MVP (2018)
- Maxwell Award (2018)
- Walter Camp Award (2018)
- Sporting News College Football Player of the Year (2018)
- 2× Polynesian College Football Player of the Year (2018, 2019)
- Consensus All-American (2018)
- NCAA passer rating leader (2018)
- SEC Offensive Player of the Year (2018)
- First-team All-SEC (2018)
- Second-team All-SEC (2019)

NCAA (FBS) record

- Career passer rating: 199.4

== Player profile ==
Tagovailoa has been noted for his throwing accuracy and touch, particularly in passes traveling over 20 yards in the air despite criticism of his arm strength. His awareness while scanning the field, avoiding defenders in the pocket and running have been highly touted, with one source endearingly calling it his "Spidey-sense" in reference to the superhero Spider-Man. In particular, Tagovailoa has been efficient in running the run-pass option, one of his strengths in college and early on in his professional career, and his time to throw and time to release are among the fastest in the league. However, his injury history has been extensive, and he has struggled when defenses keep him in the pocket for extended periods of time and force him to improvise.

During his tenure as Miami's head coach, Mike McDaniel utilized Tagovailoa's fast processing and decision-making skills as an integral part of the Dolphins' offense, which relied heavily on rhythm, timing, fast receivers such as Tyreek Hill and Jaylen Waddle, and pre-snap assessment, aiding Tagovailoa's further development as a pocket passer.

== Personal life ==
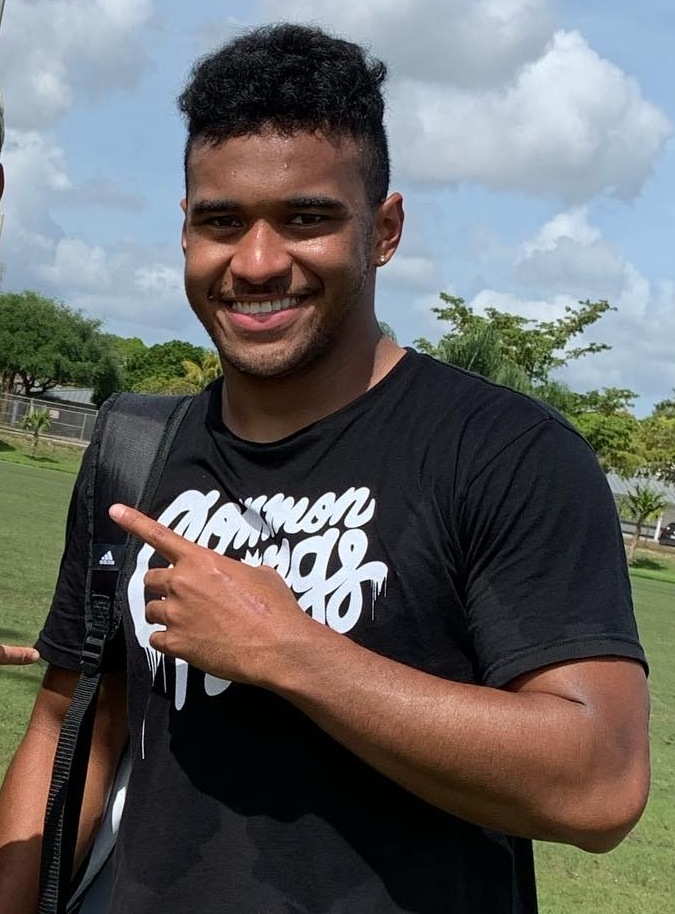
Tagovailoa in 2021

Tagovailoa graduated early from Saint Louis School and moved with his family to Alabaster, Alabama, after his commitment to play for the University of Alabama. Tagovailoa is an evangelical Christian. He has been married to his wife, Annah (née Gore), since 2022. They have two children; a son, and a daughter.

Although Tagovailoa is predominantly right-handed, his father trained him to throw the ball with his left hand as a child, because he wanted a left-handed son. As of the 2025 season, he is one of three starting left-handed quarterbacks currently in the NFL, alongside Michael Penix Jr. and Dillon Gabriel.

His younger brother, Taulia Tagovailoa, is currently a quarterback in the United Football League (UFL) for the Houston Gamblers and previously played in the CFL, ELF and IFL. He transferred to Maryland in 2020 after spending a year as Tagovailoa's backup at Alabama in 2019. Two of Tagovailoa's cousins also play football: Myron Tagovailoa-Amosa played on the defensive line on the Raiders; Adam Amosa-Tagovailoa played on the offensive line at Navy.

In 2023, Tagovailoa began practicing jiu-jitsu in response to the concussions he suffered in the 2022 NFL season.

Tagovailoa is a supporter of the Samoa national rugby league team, and publicly pledged his support to the team during the 2021 Rugby League World Cup where they made the Final for the first time.

In 2025, Tagovailoa was added to President Donald Trump's Council on Sports, Fitness, and Nutrition. Although he was named to the council without his knowledge, Tagovailoa went on to call the nomination "an honor".

=== Philanthropy ===
In February 2021, Tagovailoa announced the establishment of the Tua Foundation, a nonprofit dedicated to the support of youth initiatives, health and wellness, and other charitable causes. The foundation focuses its efforts in communities that have had the most prominent impact on Tua including Hawaii, Alabama, and Miami. The board of directors is composed of Tua Tagovailoa, June Jones, Jesse Sapolu, Vai Sikahema, and Diane Tagovailoa.

In recognition of the foundation launch, three grants of $16,667 (totaling $50,000) were awarded on February 4 to the Police Athletic League of North Miami, Big Oak Ranch in Springville, Alabama, and the Polynesian Football Hall of Fame in Honolulu.

In June 2020, Tagovailoa announced the establishment of a $300,000 scholarship endowment to benefit his high school, Saint Louis School in Honolulu, Hawaiʻi.

The Tua Foundation hosted its inaugural fundraising event in August 2021, raising $93,000 for the Tallapoosa County Girls Ranch to cover funeral expenses for the eight juveniles, ages 4–17, that were lost in a devastating car crash, and also counseling expenses to the girls of the ranch that lost loved ones.

=== Hawaiian and Samoan culture ===
Tagovailoa identifies as "full Samoan" and "not Hawaiian" even though he is from Hawaii. In his youth, Tagovailoa looked up to Marcus Mariota, Timmy Chang, and Manti Te'o, three other football players from Hawaii.

On May 19, 2018, Tagovailoa returned to Hawaii after winning the National Championship game with Crimson Tide teammate and friend Najee Harris to be celebrated at the Hometown Hero Parade. To celebrate his accomplishments that year, Tagovailoa performed a traditional Samoan ceremonial dance called a taualuga, which is often performed as a "final" step in a monumental task. He wore traditional Samoan clothing, headwear, and shoes, and was accompanied by his friend and cousin. Money is thrown at the dancer, and Tagovailoa chose to donate this money to his hometown church and youth football program.

Tagovailoa enjoyed sharing his culture with his Alabama teammates, bringing his teammates Joshua Casher and Alex Leatherwood to explore Oahu's Polynesian Cultural Center's villages. He believed it was a "good experience for them (his teammates) to see a good mix of cultures", and after they remarked on how they could lead traditional Samoan chants before Alabama games.

In 2024, Tagovailoa collaborated with clothing brand Perry Ellis on a modern island life-themed line of clothing. He was inspired by aspects of his culture when designing the pieces and the clothing he grew up wearing. Tagovailoa commented on how clothing designs that were normal for his culture's everyday wear were pushing the boundaries of design for a company like Perry Ellis that typically sticks to more classic designs.

== See also ==
- List of NFL annual passer rating leaders
- List of NFL annual passing yards leaders
- List of NFL career passer rating leaders
- Tua Tagovailoa concussion controversy – 2022–2024 NFL controversy regarding repeated concussions
