= 2016 Notre Dame Fighting Irish football team =

American college football season

2016 Notre Dame Fighting Irish football
- Conference: Independent
- Record: 4–8
- Head coach: Brian Kelly (7th season)
- Offensive coordinator: Mike Sanford Jr. (2nd season)
- Offensive scheme: Spread
- Defensive coordinator: Brian VanGorder (3rd season; first 4 games); Greg Hudson (interim; remainder of season)
- Base defense: Multiple 4–3
- MVP: DeShone Kizer
- Captains: Mike McGlinchey; Isaac Rochell; James Onwualu; Torii Hunter Jr.
- Home stadium: Notre Dame Stadium

2016 NCAA Division I FBS independents football records
	Conf.			Overall
Team	W		L	W		L
BYU		–		9	–	4
Army		–		8	–	5
Notre Dame		–		4	–	8
UMass		–		2	–	10
Rankings from AP Poll

The 2016 Notre Dame Fighting Irish football team was an American football team that represented the University of Notre Dame as an independent during the 2016 NCAA Division I FBS football season. In their seventh year under head coach Brian Kelly, the Irish compiled a 4–8 record and outscored opponents by a total of 371 to 334. They were ranked No. 10 in the preseason AP poll, but dropped out of the poll after losing two of the first three games. They played two games against ranked opponents, losing to No. 12 Michigan State and No. 12 USC. Despite the disappointing season, athletic director Jack Swarbrick found the 2016 team to be a remarkable bunch, citing the team's "enthusiasm" and "willingness to practice".

The team's statistical leaders included quarterback DeShone Kizer (2,925 passing yards, 26 passing touchdowns), running back Josh Adams (933 rushing yards), wide receiver Equanimeous St. Brown (58 receptions for 961 yards), kicker Justin Yoon (83 points scored), and linebacker Nyles Morgan (93 total tackles).

The team played its home games at Notre Dame Stadium in Notre Dame, Indiana.

== Schedule ==
Date	Time	Opponent	Rank	Site	TV	Result	Attendance
September 4	7:30 p.m.	at Texas	No. 10	Darrell K. Royal–Texas Memorial Stadium; Austin, TX	ABC	L 47–50 ^{2OT}	102,315
September 10	3:30 p.m.	Nevada	No. 18	Notre Dame Stadium; Notre Dame, IN	NBC	W 39–10	80,795
September 17	7:30 p.m.	No. 12 Michigan State	No. 18	Notre Dame Stadium; Notre Dame, IN (rivalry)	NBC	L 28–36	80,795
September 24	3:30 p.m.	Duke		Notre Dame Stadium; Notre Dame, IN	NBC	L 35–38	80,795
October 1	12:00 p.m.	vs. Syracuse		MetLife Stadium; East Rutherford, NJ	ESPN	W 50–33	62,794
October 8	12:00 p.m.	at NC State		Carter–Finley Stadium; Raleigh, NC	ABC	L 3–10	58,200
October 15	7:30 p.m.	Stanford		Notre Dame Stadium; Notre Dame, IN (rivalry)	NBC	L 10–17	80,795
October 29	3:30 p.m.	Miami (FL)		Notre Dame Stadium; Notre Dame, IN (rivalry)	NBC	W 30–27	80,795
November 5	11:30 a.m.	vs. Navy		EverBank Field; Jacksonville, FL (rivalry)	CBS	L 27–28	50,867
November 12	3:30 p.m.	vs. Army		Alamodome; San Antonio, TX (Shamrock Series, rivalry)	NBC	W 44–6	45,762
November 19	3:30 p.m.	Virginia Tech		Notre Dame Stadium; Notre Dame, IN	NBC	L 31–34	80,795
November 26	3:30 p.m	at No. 12 USC		Los Angeles Memorial Coliseum; Los Angeles, CA (rivalry)	ABC	L 27–45	72,402
Rankings from AP Poll released prior to the game; All times are in Eastern time

== Before the season ==
Before the season began, several Notre Dame players were selected in the 2016 NFL draft, including offensive tackle Ronnie Stanley, wide receiver Will Fuller, linebacker Jaylon Smith, center Nick Martin, cornerback KeiVarae Russell, running back C. J. Prosise, and defensive tackle Sheldon Day. The Irish also lost free safety Max Redfield and cornerback Devin Butler in the offseason for violating team policies.

Also, Brian VanGorder was relieved of his duties as the team's defensive coordinator and replaced by Greg Hudson. Kelly said, "I have the utmost respect for Brian as both a person and football coach, but our defense simply isn't where it should be and I believe this change is necessary for the best interest of our program and our student-athletes."

== Rankings ==
Ranking movements Legend: ██ Increase in ranking ██ Decrease in ranking — = Not ranked RV = Received votes
	Week															
Poll	Pre	1	2	3	4	5	6	7	8	9	10	11	12	13	14	Final
AP	10	18	18	RV	—	—	—	—	—	—	—	—	—	—	—	—
Coaches	9	21	18	RV	—	—	—	—	—	—	—	—	—	—	—	—
CFP	Not released									—	—	—	—	—	—	Not released

== Game summaries ==
=== At Texas ===
Notre Dame at Texas

Team	1	2	3	4	OT	2OT	Total
No. 10 Fighting Irish	7	7	14	9	7	3	47
• Longhorns	7	14	10	6	7	6	50

- Date: September 4, 2016
- Location: Darrell K. Royal Texas Memorial Stadium
  Austin, TX
- Game start: 7:42 p.m. EDT
- Elapsed time: 4 hours
- Game attendance: 102,315
- Game weather: Temperature: 91 °F (33 °C) • Weather: Mostly Cloudy • Wind: SE 8 MPH
- Referee: Gary Patterson
- TV announcers (ABC): Joe Tessitore, Todd Blackledge and Holly Rowe (sideline)

Statistics	ND	TEX
First downs	22	26
Total yards	444	517
Rushing yards	206	237
Passing yards	238	280
Turnovers	0	1
Time of possession	32:42	27:18

Team	Category	Player	Statistics
Notre Dame	Passing	DeShone Kizer	15/24, 215 yards, 5 TD
Notre Dame	Rushing	Tarean Folston	18 rushes, 88 yards
Notre Dame	Receiving	Equanimeous St. Brown	5 receptions, 75 yards, 2 TD
Texas	Passing	Shane Buechele	16/26, 280 yards, 2 TD, INT
Texas	Rushing	D'Onta Foreman	24 rushes, 131 yards, TD
Texas	Receiving	John Burt	6 receptions, 111 yards, TD

=== Nevada ===
Nevada at Notre Dame

Team	1	2	3	4	Total
Wolf Pack	0	0	3	7	10
• No. 18 Fighting Irish	0	25	14	0	39

- Date: September 10, 2016
- Location: Notre Dame Stadium
  South Bend, IN
- Game start: 3:42 p.m. EDT
- Elapsed time: 3 hours and 25 minutes
- Game attendance: 80,795
- Game weather: Temperature: 70 °F (21 °C) • Weather: Partly Cloudy • Wind: W 12 MPH
- Referee: Jeff Maconaghy
- TV announcers (NBC): Mike Tirico, Doug Flutie and Kathryn Tappen (sideline)

Statistics	NEV	ND
First downs	16	21
Total yards	300	444
Rushing yards	99	239
Passing yards	201	205
Turnovers	1	1
Time of possession	26:28	33:32

Team	Category	Player	Statistics
Nevada	Passing	Tyler Stewart	10/23, 113 yards, INT
Nevada	Rushing	James Butler	17 rushes, 50 yards
Nevada	Receiving	Andrew Celis	1 reception, 68 yards
Notre Dame	Passing	DeShone Kizer	15/18, 156 yards, 2 TD, INT
Notre Dame	Rushing	Josh Adams	10 rushes, 106 yards
Notre Dame	Receiving	Equanimeous St. Brown	6 receptions, 85 yards

=== No. 12 Michigan State ===
Michigan State at Notre Dame
(Megaphone Trophy)

Team	1	2	3	4	Total
• No. 12 Spartans	0	15	21	0	36
No. 18 Fighting Irish	7	0	7	14	28

- Date: September 17, 2016
- Location: Notre Dame Stadium
  South Bend, IN
- Game start: 7:44 p.m. EDT
- Elapsed time: 3 hours and 31 minutes
- Game attendance: 80,795
- Game weather: Temperature: 77 °F (25 °C) • Weather: Clear • Wind: W 6 MPH
- Referee: Dan Capron
- TV announcers (NBC): Mike Tirico, Doug Flutie and Kathryn Tappen (sideline)

Statistics	MSU	ND
First downs	22	19
Total yards	501	401
Rushing yards	260	57
Passing yards	241	344
Turnovers	1	3
Time of possession	37:57	22:03

Team	Category	Player	Statistics
Michigan State	Passing	Tyler O'Connor	19/26, 241 yards, 2 TD, INT
Michigan State	Rushing	Gerald Holmes	13 rushes, 100 yards, 2 TD
Michigan State	Receiving	Donnie Corley	4 receptions, 88 yards, TD
Notre Dame	Passing	DeShone Kizer	20/37, 344 yards, 2 TD, INT
Notre Dame	Rushing	Josh Adams	12 rushes, 29 yards
Notre Dame	Receiving	Torii Hunter Jr.	5 receptions, 95 yards

=== Duke ===
Duke at Notre Dame

Team	1	2	3	4	Total
• Blue Devils	14	14	0	10	38
Fighting Irish	14	7	7	7	35

- Date: September 24, 2016
- Location: Notre Dame Stadium
  South Bend, IN
- Game start: 3:40 p.m. EDT
- Elapsed time: 3 hours and 14 minutes
- Game attendance: 80,795
- Game weather: Temperature: 74 °F (23 °C) • Weather: Mostly Cloudy • Wind: ENE 9 MPH
- Referee: Riley Johnson
- TV announcers (NBC): Mike Tirico, Doug Flutie and Kathryn Tappen (sideline)

Statistics	DUKE	ND
First downs	24	24
Total yards	498	534
Rushing yards	208	153
Passing yards	290	381
Turnovers	1	3
Time of possession	30:35	29:25

Team	Category	Player	Statistics
Duke	Passing	Daniel Jones	24/32, 290 yards, 3 TD, INT
Duke	Rushing	Jela Duncan	21 rushes, 121 yards, TD
Duke	Receiving	Anthony Nash	6 receptions, 123 yards, 2 TD
Notre Dame	Passing	DeShone Kizer	22/37, 381 yards, 2 TD, INT
Notre Dame	Rushing	DeShone Kizer	11 rushes, 60 yards, TD
Notre Dame	Receiving	Equanimeous St. Brown	6 receptions, 116 yards, TD

=== Vs. Syracuse ===
Notre Dame Fighting Irish vs. Syracuse Orange

Quarter	1	2	3	4	Total
Fighting Irish	23	10	14	3	50
Orange	13	14	0	6	33

at MetLife Stadium, East Rutherford, New Jersey

- Date: October 1, 2016
- Game time: 12:00 p.m. EST
- Game weather: Cloudy, 60 °F (16 °C)
- Game attendance: 62,794
- Referee: Stuart Mullins
- TV announcers (ESPN): Bob Wischusen, Brock Huard, and Allison Williams
- Box Score

Game information

First quarter

- ND – Equanimeous St. Brown 79-yard pass from DeShone Kizer (Justin Yoon kick), 14:42. Notre Dame 7–0. Drive: 1 play, 79 yards, 0:18.
- SU – Eric Dungey 3-yard run (kick blocked), 12:36. Notre Dame 7–6. Drive: 8 plays, 75 yards, 2:06.
- ND – Cole Luke PAT return, 12:36. Notre Dame 9–6.
- ND – Equanimeous St. Brown 67-yard pass from DeShone Kizer (Justin Yoo kick), 11:23. Notre Dame 16–6. Drive: 3 plays, 74 yards, 1:14.
- SU – Amba Etta-Tawo 72-yard pass from Eric Dungey (Cole Murphy kick), 10:17. Notre Dame 16–13. Drive: 3 plays, 79 yards, 1:06.
- ND – C. J. Sanders 93-yard kickoff return (Justin Yoon kick), 10:06. Notre Dame 23–13.

Second quarter

- SU – Eric Dungey 1-yard run (Cole Murphy kick), 13:22. Notre Dame 23–20. Drive: 9 plays, 78 yards, 3:06.
- ND – DeShone Kizer 3-yard run (Justin Yoon kick), 12:11. Notre Dame 30–20. Drive: 5 plays, 71 yards, 1:11.
- ND – Justin Yoon 31-yard field goal, 5:03. Notre Dame 33–20. Drive: 7 plays, 37 yards, 3:11.
- SU – Ervin Phillips 14-yard pass from Eric Dungey (Cole Murphy kick), 0:30. Notre Dame 33–27. Drive: 2 plays, 14 yards, 0:08.

Third quarter

- ND – Kevin Stepherson 54-yard pass from DeShone Kizer (Justin Yoon kick), 11:23. Notre Dame 40–27. Drive: 4 plays, 86 yards, 1:41.
- ND – Dexter Williams 59-yard run (Justin Yoon kick), 8:26. Notre Dame 47–27. Drive: 3 plays, 70 yards, 1:22.

Fourth quarter

- ND – Justin Yoon 39-yard field goal, 11:14. Notre Dame 50–27. Drive: 11 plays, 72 yards, 3:58.
- SU – Eric Dungey 5-yard run (run failed), 6:52. Notre Dame 50—33. Drive: 14 plays, 75 yards, 4:22.

Top passers

- ND – DeShone Kizer – 23/35, 471 yards, 3 TD, INT
- SU – Eric Dungey – 31/51, 363 yards, 2 TD

Top rushers

- ND – Josh Adams – 20 rushes, 102 yards
- SU – Eric Dungey – 17 rushes, 49 yards, 3 TD

Top receivers

- ND – Equanimeous St. Brown – 4 receptions, 182 yards, 2 TD
- SU – Amba Etta-Tawo – 7 receptions, 134 yards, TD

=== At NC State ===
Notre Dame at NC State

Team	1	2	3	4	Total
Fighting Irish	0	0	3	0	3
• Wolfpack	3	0	0	7	10

- Date: October 8, 2016
- Location: Carter–Finley Stadium
  Raleigh, NC
- Game start: 12:00 p.m. EDT
- Elapsed time: 4 hours
- Game attendance: 58,200
- Game weather: Temperature: 69 °F (21 °C) • Weather: Hurricane Matthew • Wind: NE 18 MPH
- Referee: Jeff Heaser
- TV announcers (ABC): Dave Pasch, Greg McElroy, and Tom Luginbill (sideline)

Statistics	ND	NCST
First downs	10	14
Total yards	113	198
Rushing yards	59	157
Passing yards	54	41
Turnovers	3	2
Time of possession	27:41	32:19

Team	Category	Player	Statistics
Notre Dame	Passing	DeShone Kizer	9/26, 54 yards, INT
Notre Dame	Rushing	Josh Adams	14 rushes, 51 yards
Notre Dame	Receiving	Equanimeous St. Brown	3 receptions, 30 yards
NC State	Passing	Ryan Finley	5/12, 27 yards
NC State	Rushing	Matt Dayes	23 rushes, 126 yards
NC State	Receiving	Matt Dayes	3 receptions, 14 yards

The Notre Dame vs NC State game was played during Hurricane Matthew where the two teams combined for only 311 total yards. The only touchdown of the game was scored by NC State on a blocked punt leading NC State to win it 10–3.

=== Stanford ===
Stanford at Notre Dame
(Legends Trophy)

Team	1	2	3	4	Total
• Cardinal	0	0	9	8	17
Fighting Irish	7	3	0	0	10

- Date: October 15, 2016
- Location: Notre Dame Stadium
  South Bend, IN
- Game start: 7:40 p.m. EDT
- Elapsed time: 3 hours and 17 minutes
- Game attendance: 80,795
- Game weather: Temperature: 69 °F (21 °C) • Weather: Mostly Cloudy • Wind: S 9 MPH
- Referee: Michael Batlan
- TV announcers (NBC): Dan Hicks, Doug Flutie and Kathryn Tappen (sideline)

Statistics	STAN	ND
First downs	18	16
Total yards	296	307
Rushing yards	176	153
Passing yards	120	154
Turnovers	3	2
Time of possession	32:51	27:09

Team	Category	Player	Statistics
Stanford	Passing	Ryan Burns	10/19, 120 yards, INT
Stanford	Rushing	Bryce Love	23 rushes, 129 yards, TD
Stanford	Receiving	Michael Rector	3 receptions, 34 yards
Notre Dame	Passing	DeShone Kizer	14/26, 154 yards, 2 INT
Notre Dame	Rushing	DeShone Kizer	11 rushes, 83 yards, TD
Notre Dame	Receiving	Torii Hunter Jr.	4 receptions, 70 yards

=== Miami (FL) ===
Miami (FL) at Notre Dame

Team	1	2	3	4	Total
Hurricanes	0	7	10	10	27
• Fighting Irish	17	3	0	10	30

- Date: October 29, 2016
- Location: Notre Dame Stadium
  South Bend, IN
- Game start: 3:40 p.m. EDT
- Elapsed time: 3 hours and 38 minutes
- Game attendance: 80,795
- Game weather: Temperature: 70 °F (21 °C) • Weather: Overcast • Wind: WSW 9 MPH
- Referee: Jeff Flanagan
- TV announcers (NBC): Dan Hicks, Doug Flutie and Kathryn Tappen (sideline)

Statistics	MIA	ND
First downs	20	20
Total yards	306	411
Rushing yards	18	148
Passing yards	288	263
Turnovers	1	2
Time of possession	33:25	26:35

Team	Category	Player	Statistics
Miami	Passing	Brad Kaaya	26/42, 288 yards, TD, INT
Miami	Rushing	Mark Walton	18 rushes, 45 yards, TD
Miami	Receiving	Stacy Coley	7 receptions, 81 yards
Notre Dame	Passing	DeShone Kizer	25/38, 263 yards, 2 TD
Notre Dame	Rushing	Josh Adams	12 rushes, 94 yards, TD
Notre Dame	Receiving	Kevin Stepherson	2 receptions, 78 yards

=== Vs. Navy ===
Notre Dame vs Navy
(Rip Miller Trophy)

Team	1	2	3	4	Total
Fighting Irish	10	7	7	3	27
• Midshipmen	7	7	7	7	28

- Date: November 5, 2016
- Location: EverBank Field
  Jacksonville, FL
- Game start: 11:40 a.m. EDT
- Elapsed time: 3 hours and 5 minutes
- Game attendance: 50,867
- Game weather: Temperature: 70 °F (21 °C) • Weather: Partly Cloudy • Wind: ENE 13 MPH
- Referee: Jerry Magallanes
- TV announcers (CBS): Carter Blackburn, Adam Archuleta and Jenny Dell (sideline)

Statistics	ND	NAVY
First downs	21	21
Total yards	370	368
Rushing yards	147	320
Passing yards	223	48
Turnovers	0	0
Time of possession	26:07	33:53

Team	Category	Player	Statistics
Notre Dame	Passing	DeShone Kizer	19/27, 223 yards, 3 TD
Notre Dame	Rushing	Josh Adams	12 rushes, 73 yards
Notre Dame	Receiving	Torii Hunter Jr.	8 receptions, 104 yards, TD
Navy	Passing	Will Worth	5/8, 48 yards
Navy	Rushing	Will Worth	28 rushes, 175 yards, 2 TD
Navy	Receiving	Jamir Tillman	4 receptions, 41 yards

=== Vs. Army ===
Notre Dame vs Army
(rivalry / Shamrock Series)

Team	1	2	3	4	Total
Black Knights	0	6	0	0	6
• Fighting Irish	21	17	6	0	44

- Date: November 12, 2016
- Location: Alamodome
  San Antonio, TX
- Game start: 3:39 p.m. EST
- Elapsed time: 2 hours and 55 minutes
- Game attendance: 45,762
- Game weather: Temperature: 74 °F (23 °C) • Weather: Indoors • Wind: N/A
- Referee: Stuart Mullins
- TV announcers (NBC): Dan Hicks, Doug Flutie and Kathryn Tappen (sideline)

Statistics	ARMY	ND
First downs	10	31
Total yards	242	476
Rushing yards	229	261
Passing yards	13	215
Turnovers	1	1
Time of possession	25:38	34:22

Team	Category	Player	Statistics
Army	Passing	Malik McGue	2/3, 13 yards, INT
Army	Rushing	Darnell Woolfolk	11 rushes, 95 yards
Army	Receiving	Christian Poe	1 reception, 9 yards
Notre Dame	Passing	DeShone Kizer	17/28, 209 yards, 3 TD, INT
Notre Dame	Rushing	Tarean Holston	13 rushes, 84 yards, TD
Notre Dame	Receiving	Kevin Stepherson	5 receptions, 75 yards, TD

=== Virginia Tech ===
Virginia Tech at Notre Dame

Team	1	2	3	4	Total
• Hokies	0	14	7	13	34
Fighting Irish	10	14	7	0	31

- Date: November 19, 2016
- Location: Notre Dame Stadium
  South Bend, IN
- Game start: 3:40 p.m. EST
- Elapsed time: 3 hours and 22 minutes
- Game attendance: 80,795
- Game weather: Temperature: 36 °F (2 °C) • Weather: Cloudy and Snow Flurries • Wind: WNW 20 MPH
- Referee: Duane Heydt
- TV announcers (NBC): Dan Hicks, Doug Flutie and Kathryn Tappen (sideline)

Statistics	VT	ND
First downs	25	22
Total yards	419	449
Rushing yards	152	200
Passing yards	267	249
Turnovers	2	0
Time of possession	32:45	27:15

Team	Category	Player	Statistics
Virginia Tech	Passing	Jerod Evans	22/29, 267 yards, 2 TD, INT
Virginia Tech	Rushing	Jerod Evans	18 rushes, 67 yards, TD
Virginia Tech	Receiving	Isaiah Ford	7 receptions, 86 yards
Notre Dame	Passing	DeShone Kizer	16/33, 235 yards, 2 TD
Notre Dame	Rushing	Josh Adams	13 rushes, 100 yards, 2 TD
Notre Dame	Receiving	Equanimeous St. Brown	6 receptions, 90 yards

=== At No. 12 USC ===
Notre Dame at USC
(Jeweled Shillelagh)

Team	1	2	3	4	Total
Fighting Irish	7	0	14	6	27
• No. 12 Trojans	10	14	14	7	45

- Date: November 26, 2016
- Location: Los Angeles Memorial Coliseum
  Los Angeles, CA
- Game start: 3:42 p.m. EST
- Elapsed time: 3 hours and 39 minutes
- Game attendance: 72,402
- Game weather: Temperature: 63 °F (17 °C) • Weather: Partly Cloudy and Rain • Wind: E 5 MPH
- Referee: Ron Cherry
- TV announcers (ABC): Steve Levy, Brian Griese and Todd McShay (sideline)

Statistics	ND	USC
First downs	23	23
Total yards	408	412
Rushing yards	154	207
Passing yards	254	205
Turnovers	2	1
Time of possession	28:57	31:03

Team	Category	Player	Statistics
Notre Dame	Passing	DeShone Kizer	17/32, 220 yards, 2 TD, INT
Notre Dame	Rushing	Josh Adams	17 rushes, 180 yards
Notre Dame	Receiving	Equanimeous St. Brown	7 receptions, 94 yards, TD
USC	Passing	Sam Darnold	19/29, 205 yards, 2 TD
USC	Rushing	Ronald Jones II	16 rushes, 134 yards, TD
USC	Receiving	Adoree' Jackson	1 reception, 52 yards, TD

== Personnel ==
2016 Notre Dame Fighting Irish football team roster
Players
Coaches
Offense

Pos.	#	Name	Class
RB	2	Dexter Williams	So
WR	3	C.J. Sanders	So
QB	4	Montgomery VanGorder	Jr
WR	6	Equanimeous St. Brown	So
QB	7	Brandon Wimbush	So
QB	9	Malik Zaire	Sr
WR	10	Chris Finke	So
TE	10	Alizé Jones	So
RB	11	Justin Brent	Jr
QB	12	Ian Book	Fr
TE	13	Tyler Luatua	Jr
QB	14	DeShone Kizer	Jr
WR	15	Corey Holmes	Jr
WR	16	Torii Hunter Jr.	Sr
QB	17	Nolan Henry	So
WR	18	Buster Sheridan	Sr
WR	24	Mick Assaf	Fr
RB	25	Tarean Folston	Sr
WR	26	Austin Webster	Jr
RB	28	Austin Ross	Sr
WR	29	Kevin Stepherson	Fr
RB	33	Josh Adams	So
RB	34	Tony Jones Jr.	Fr
WR	35	Grant Hammann	Jr
WR	37	Omar Hunter	Sr
WR	38	Deon McIntosh	Fr
RB	40	Brett Segobiano	Fr
WR	43	Brian Ball	So
RB	46	Josh Anderson	GS
RB	49	Bailey Ross	Sr
OL	50	Parker Boudreaux	Fr
OL	53	Sam Mustipher	Jr
OL	56	Quenton Nelson	Jr
OL	57	Trevor Ruhland	So
OL	62	Colin McGovern	Sr
OL	63	Sam Bush	Jr
OL	66	Tristen Hoge	So
OL	67	Jimmy Byrne	Jr
OL	68	Mike McGlinchey	Sr
OL	69	Logan Plantz	So
OL	70	Hunter Bivin	Sr
OL	71	Alex Bars	Jr
OL	74	Liam Eichenberg	Fr
OL	75	Mark Harrell	GS
OL	78	Tommy Kraemer	Fr
TE	80	Durham Smythe	Sr
WR	81	Miles Boykin	So
TE	82	Nic Weishar	Jr
WR	83	Chase Claypool	Fr
TE	84	Ben Suttman	Sr
WR	85	Arion Shinaver	Fr
WR	87	Keenan Centlivre	Jr
WR	88	Javon McKinley	Fr
TE	89	Jacob Matuska	Sr

Defense

Pos.	#	Name	Class
LB	4	Te'von Coney	So
LB	5	Nyles Morgan	Jr
CB	7	Nick Watkins	Jr
S	8	Avery Sebastian	GS
DL	9	Daelin Hayes	Fr
CB	12	Devin Butler	Sr
S	14	Devin Studstill	Fr
LB	17	James Onwualu	Sr
CB	18	Troy Pride Jr.	Fr
DB	20	Shaun Crawford	So
S	21	Jalen Elliott	Fr
LB	22	Asmar Bilal	So
S	23	Drue Tranquill	Jr
DB	24	Nick Coleman	So
CB	26	Ashton White	So
CB	27	Julian Love	Fr
S	28	Nicco Fertitta	So
LB	30	Josh Barajas	So
S	31	Spencer Perry	Fr
S	32	D.J. Morgan	Fr
CB	34	Jesse Bongiovi	Sr
CB	35	Donte Vaughn	Fr
CB	36	Cole Luke	Sr
S	37	Robert Regan	So
S	38	Christopher Schilling	Fr
S	39	Drew Recker	Sr
LB	40	Kier Murphy	So
LB	41	Jimmy Thompson	So
DL	42	Julian Okwara	Fr
LB	44	Jamir Jones	Fr
LB	45	Jonathan Jones	Fr
LB	48	Greer Martini	Jr
LB	49	Brandon Hutson	So
LB	51	Devyn Spruell	So
DL	53	Khalid Kareem	Fr
DL	54	Lincoln Feist	So
DL	55	Jonathan Bonner	Jr
DL	58	Elijah Taylor	So
DL	60	John Montelus	Sr
DL	64	Ryan Kilander	Jr
DL	75	Daniel Cage	Jr
DL	77	Brandon Tiassum	So
DL	90	Isaac Rochell	Sr
DL	91	Adetokunbo Ogundeji	Fr
DL	93	Jay Hayes	Jr
DL	94	Jarron Jones	GS
DL	95	Marquis Dickerson	Sr
DL	96	Pete Mokwuah	Jr
DL	97	Micah Dew-Treadway	So
DL	98	Andrew Trumbetti	Jr
DL	99	Jerry Tillery	So

Special teams

Pos.	#	Name	Class
K	19	Justin Yoon	So
K	29	Sam Kohler	Jr
K	42	Jeff Riney	So
K	43	John Chereson	Sr
LS	54	John Shannon	Fr
LS	61	Scott Daly	GS
P	85	Tyler Newsome	Jr

Head coach

- Brian Kelly

Coordinators/assistant coaches

- Bob Elliott – Special Assistant to the Head Coach
- Paul Longo – Director of Football Strength and Conditioning
- Mike Denbrock – Associate Head Coach/Wide Receivers
- Mike Sanford – Offensive Coordinator/Quarterbacks
- Brian VanGorder – Defensive Coordinator
- Mike Elston – Recruiting Coordinator/Linebackers
- Scott Booker – Special Teams Coordinator/Tight Ends
- Autry Denson – Running Backs
- Harry Hiestand – Offensive Line
- Keith Gilmore – Defensive Line
- Todd Lyght – Defensive Backs Coach
- Clay Bignell – Graduate Assistant (Defense)
- Harland Bower – Graduate Assistant (Defense)
- Donovan Raiola – Graduate Assistant (Offense)
- Pryce Tracy – Graduate Assistant (Offense)
- Marty Biagi – Special Teams Analyst
- Greg Hudson – Defensive Analyst
- Matt Mitchell – Offensive Analyst
- Jake Flint – Assistant Director of Strength and Conditioning
- David Grimes – Assistant Strength and Conditioning Coach
- Jeff Quinn – Assistant Strength and Conditioning Coach
- Dwight Allison – Sports Nutrition Program Director
- Tim Collins – Video Coordinator
- Julie DeBuysser – Senior Staff Assistant-Assistant Coaches
- Ryan Grooms – Head Football Equipment Manager
- Rob Hunt – Head Football Athletic Trainer
- Chad Klunder – Associate Athletic Director for Football Operations
- Joy McCausland – Senior Staff Assistant
- Jason Michelson – Coordinator of Football Operations
- David Peloquin – Director of Player Personnel
- Ron Powlus – Director of Player Development
- Beth Rex – Director of Football Administration
- Dr. Chris Balint – Orthopedic Surgeon
- Mike Bean – Associate Athletic Trainer
- Dr. Jerry Hofferth – Chiropractor
- Jasmine Johnson – Coordinator of On-Campus Recruiting
- Aaryn Kearney – Coordinator of Recruiting Operations
- Dr. Matt Leiszler – Team Physician
- Aaron Menard – Assistant Video Coordinator
- Adam Myers – Assistant Football Equipment Manager
- Dr. Brian Ratigan – Orthopedic Surgeon
- Steve Smith – Assistant Athletic Trainer
- Laura Thomas – Recruiting (Social Media)

Legend

- (C) Team captain
- (S) Suspended
- (I) Ineligible
- Injured
- Redshirt

Roster

=== Recruiting class ===
Brian Kelly and the Notre Dame coaching staff accepted 23 commitments for the 2016 recruiting cycle, including two 5-stars: Daelin Hayes and Tommy Kraemer. The class included student-athletes from 11 different states, and one Canadian province.

College recruiting (2016)
Name	Hometown	School	Height	Weight	40^{‡}	Commit date
Ian Book; QB	El Dorado Hills, California	Oak Ridge High School	6 ft 0 in (1.83 m)	190 lb (86 kg)	–	Aug 14, 2015
Ian Book; QB	Recruit ratings: Scout: Rivals: (79)					
Parker Boudreaux; OL	Winter Garden, Florida	Bishop Moore High School	6 ft 3 in (1.91 m)	300 lb (140 kg)	–	Jul 2, 2015
Parker Boudreaux; OL	Recruit ratings: Scout: Rivals: (80)					
Chase Claypool; WR	Abbotsford, British Columbia	Abbotsford Senior Secondary	6 ft 4 in (1.93 m)	215 lb (98 kg)	–	Jul 10, 2015
Chase Claypool; WR	Recruit ratings: Scout: Rivals: (82)					
Liam Eichenberg; OL	Westlake, Ohio	St. Ignatius High School (Cleveland, OH)	6 ft 6 in (1.98 m)	280 lb (130 kg)	–	Apr 19, 2015
Liam Eichenberg; OL	Recruit ratings: Scout: Rivals: (85)					
Jalen Elliott; DB	Richmond, Virginia	Lloyd C. Bird High School	6 ft 0 in (1.83 m)	189 lb (86 kg)	–	Jun 19, 2015
Jalen Elliott; DB	Recruit ratings: Scout: Rivals: (78)					
Daelin Hayes; DE/LB	Belleville, Michigan	Skyline High School	6 ft 3 in (1.91 m)	240 lb (110 kg)	–	Dec 10, 2015
Daelin Hayes; DE/LB	Recruit ratings: Scout: Rivals: (81)					
Jamir Jones; LB	Rochester, New York	Aquinas Institute	6 ft 3 in (1.91 m)	220 lb (100 kg)	–	Jun 23, 2015
Jamir Jones; LB	Recruit ratings: Scout: Rivals: (72)					
Jonathan Jones; LB	Ocoee, Florida	Oak Ridge High School	6 ft 0 in (1.83 m)	200 lb (91 kg)	–	Feb 3, 2016
Jonathan Jones; LB	Recruit ratings: Scout: Rivals: (78)					
Tony Jones Jr. RB	St. Petersburg, Florida	IMG Academy (Bradenton, FL)	5 ft 10 in (1.78 m)	219 lb (99 kg)	–	Mar 22, 2015
Tony Jones Jr. RB	Recruit ratings: Scout: Rivals: (79)					
Khalid Kareem; DE	Pontiac, Michigan	Harrison High School	6 ft 4 in (1.93 m)	245 lb (111 kg)	–	Oct 23, 2015
Khalid Kareem; DE	Recruit ratings: Scout: Rivals: (83)					
Tommy Kraemer; OL	Cincinnati, Ohio	Elder High School	6 ft 5 in (1.96 m)	310 lb (140 kg)	–	Oct 4, 2014
Tommy Kraemer; OL	Recruit ratings: Scout: Rivals: (83)					
Julian Love; DB	Westchester, Illinois	Nazareth Academy	5 ft 11 in (1.80 m)	175 lb (79 kg)	–-	Mar 21, 2015
Julian Love; DB	Recruit ratings: Scout: Rivals: (79)					
Deon McIntosh; RB	Pompano Beach, Florida	Cardinal Gibbons High School	5 ft 11 in (1.80 m)	180 lb (82 kg)	–	Nov 16, 2015
Deon McIntosh; RB	Recruit ratings: Scout: Rivals: (79)					
Javon McKinley; WR	Corona, California	Centennial High School	6 ft 3 in (1.91 m)	205 lb (93 kg)	–	Jan 9, 2016
Javon McKinley; WR	Recruit ratings: Scout: Rivals: (79)					
D. J. Morgan; DB	Norwalk, California	St. John Bosco High School	6 ft 2 in (1.88 m)	190 lb (86 kg)	–	Sep 27, 2015
D. J. Morgan; DB	Recruit ratings: Scout: Rivals: (79)					
Adetokunbo Ogundeji; DE	West Bloomfield, Michigan	Walled Lake Central High School	6 ft 5 in (1.96 m)	216 lb (98 kg)	–	Jul 16, 2015
Adetokunbo Ogundeji; DE	Recruit ratings: Scout: Rivals: (78)					
Julian Okwara; DE	Charlotte, North Carolina	Ardrey Kell High School	6 ft 4 in (1.93 m)	216 lb (98 kg)	–	Apr 14, 2015
Julian Okwara; DE	Recruit ratings: Scout: Rivals: (80)					
Spencer Perry; DB	Newnan, Georgia	IMG Academy (Bradenton, FL)	6 ft 2 in (1.88 m)	204 lb (93 kg)	–	Jun 29, 2015
Spencer Perry; DB	Recruit ratings: Scout: Rivals: (80)					
Troy Pride; DB	Greer, South Carolina	Greer High School	5 ft 11 in (1.80 m)	175 lb (79 kg)	–	Dec 24, 2015
Troy Pride; DB	Recruit ratings: Scout: Rivals: (73)					
John Shannon; LS	Lake Forest, Illinois	Loyola Academy	6 ft 2 in (1.88 m)	220 lb (100 kg)	–	Mar 21, 2015
John Shannon; LS	Recruit ratings: Scout: Rivals: (68)					
Kevin Stepherson; WR	Jacksonville, Florida	First Coast High School	5 ft 11 in (1.80 m)	171 lb (78 kg)	–	Jun 18, 2015
Kevin Stepherson; WR	Recruit ratings: Scout: Rivals: (78)					
Devin Studstill; DB	Riviera Beach, Florida	Palm Beach Garden High School	6 ft 0 in (1.83 m)	189 lb (86 kg)	–	Dec 15, 2015
Devin Studstill; DB	Recruit ratings: Scout: Rivals: (77)					
Donte Vaughn; DB	Memphis, Tennessee	Whitehaven High School	6 ft 3 in (1.91 m)	190 lb (86 kg)	–	Oct 12, 2015
Donte Vaughn; DB	Recruit ratings: Scout: Rivals: (80)					
Overall recruit ranking: Scout: 13 Rivals: 12 ESPN: 16
‡ Refers to 40-yard dash; Note: In many cases, Scout, Rivals, 247Sports, On3, and ESPN may conflict in their listings of height, weight and 40 time.; In these cases, the average was taken. ESPN grades are on a 100-point scale.; Sources: "2016 Notre Dame Football Commitment List". Rivals.; "Scout.com Football Recruiting: Notre Dame". Scout.; "2016 Player Commitments – Notre Dame". ESPN.; "Scout.com Team Recruiting Rankings". Scout.; "2016 Team Ranking". Rivals.com.

== Statistics ==
Passing

1. DeShone Kizer - 212 of 361 (58.7%) for 2,925 yards, 26 touchdowns, 9 interceptions, and a 145.6 passer rating
2. Malik Zaire - 11 of 23 (47.8%) for 122 yards, 1 touchdown, 0 interceptions, and a 106.7 passer rating.

Rushing

1. Josh Adams - 933 yards on 158 carries, 5.9-yard average, 5 touchdowns
2. DeShone Kizer - 472 yards on 129 carries, 3.7-yard average, 8 touchdowns
3. Tarean Folston - 334 yards on 77 carries, 4.3-yard average, 2 touchdowns
4. Dexter Williams - 208 yards on 39 carries, 5.1-yard average, 3 touchdowns

Receiving

1. Equanimeous St. Brown (WR) - 58 receptions for 961 yards, 16.6-yard average, 9 touchdowns
2. Torii Hunter Jr. (WR) - 38 receptions for 521 yards, 13.7-yard average, 3 touchdowns
3. Kevin Stepherson (WR) - 25 receptions for 462 yards, 18.5-yard average, 5 touchdowns
4. C.J. Sanders (WR) - 24 receptions for 293 yards, 12.2-yard average, 2 touchdowns
5. Josh Adams (RB) - 21 receptions for 193 yards, 9.2-yard average, 1 touchdown
6. Chris Finke (WR) - 10 receptions for 122 yards, 12.2-yard average, 2 touchdowns
7. Durham Smythe (TE) - 9 receptions for 112 yards, 12.4-yard average, 4 touchdowns

Scoring

1. Justin Yoon (K) - 83 points, 44 of 46 PAT, 13 of 17 field goals
2. Equanimeous St. Brown (WR) - 54 points, 9 touchdowns
3. DeShone Kizer (QB) - 48 points, 8 touchdowns
4. Josh Adams (RB) - 36 points, 6 touchdowns
5. Kevin Stepherson (WR) - 30 points, 5 touchdowns
6. C.J. Sanders (WR) - 24 points, 4 touchdowns
7. Durham Smythe (TE) - 25 points, 4 touchdowns

== Awards and honors ==
Junior quarterback DeShone Kizer was won the team's most valuable player award. Wide receiver Equanimeous St. Brown was named Offensive Player of the Year, and linebacker James Onwualu was named Defensive Player of the Year. Defensive lineman Isaac Rochell was selected as Lineman of the Year.
