= Daelin Hayes =

American football player (born 1998)

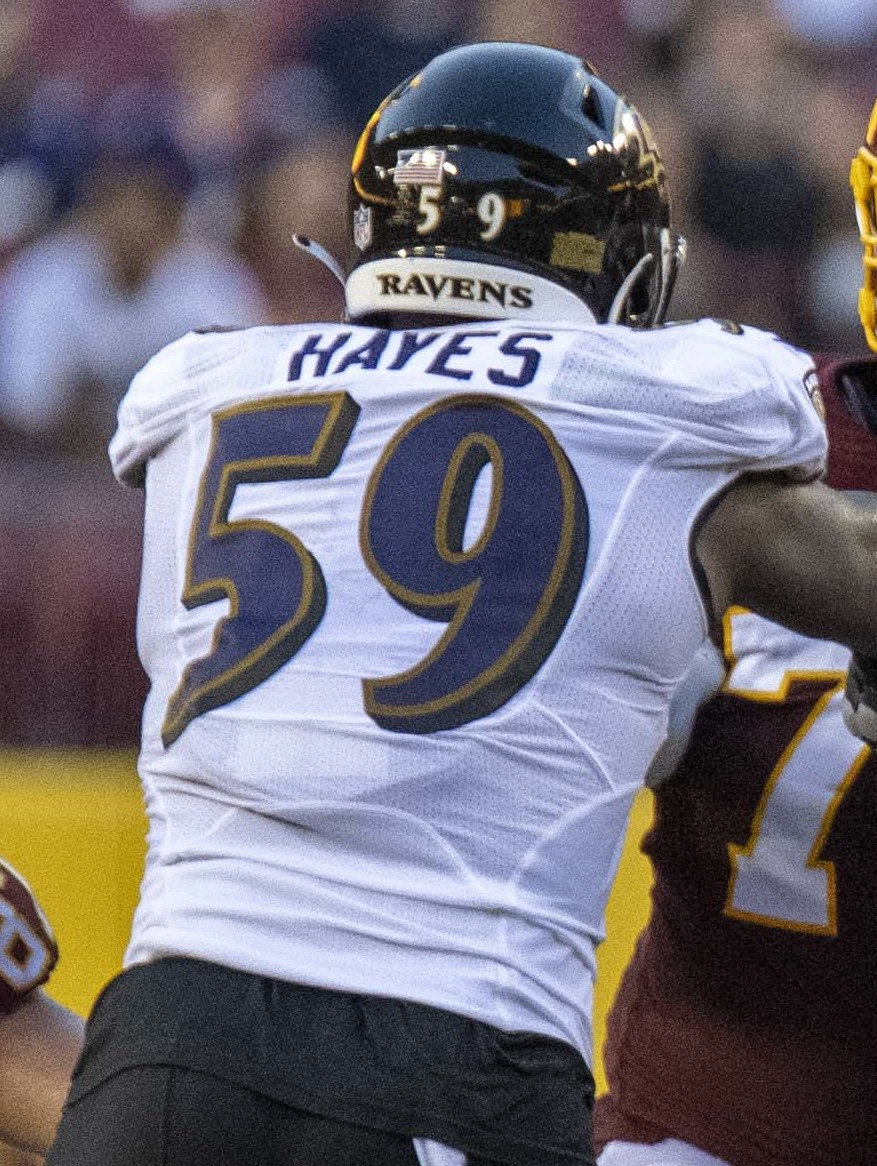
- Hayes with the Baltimore Ravens in 2021

Profile
- Position: Linebacker

Personal information
- Born: May 16, 1998 (age 28); Detroit, Michigan, U.S.
- Listed height: 6 ft 4 in (1.93 m)
- Listed weight: 253 lb (115 kg)

Career information
- High school: Skyline (Ann Arbor, Michigan)
- College: Notre Dame (2016–2020)
- NFL draft: 2021: 5th round, 171st overall pick

Career history
- Baltimore Ravens (2021–2022); San Francisco 49ers (2023)*
- * Offseason or practice squad member only

Career NFL statistics
- Games played: 1
- Stats at Pro Football Reference

Daelin Marvin Hayes (born May 16, 1998) is an American professional football player who was a linebacker in the National Football League (NFL). He played college football for the Notre Dame Fighting Irish.

== Early life ==
Hayes grew up in Belleville, Michigan and initially attended St. Mary's Preparatory in Orchard Lake Village, Michigan. He moved to California after his sophomore year and enrolled at St. Bonaventure High School, where he played football for half of a season before moving back to Michigan and transferring to Cass Technical High School in Detroit. Hayes transferred to Skyline High School in Ann Arbor, Michigan going into his senior year. He was rated a five star recruit and initially committed to play college football at USC while he was at St. Mary's. Hayes decommitted as a senior and ultimately chose Notre Dame.

== College career ==
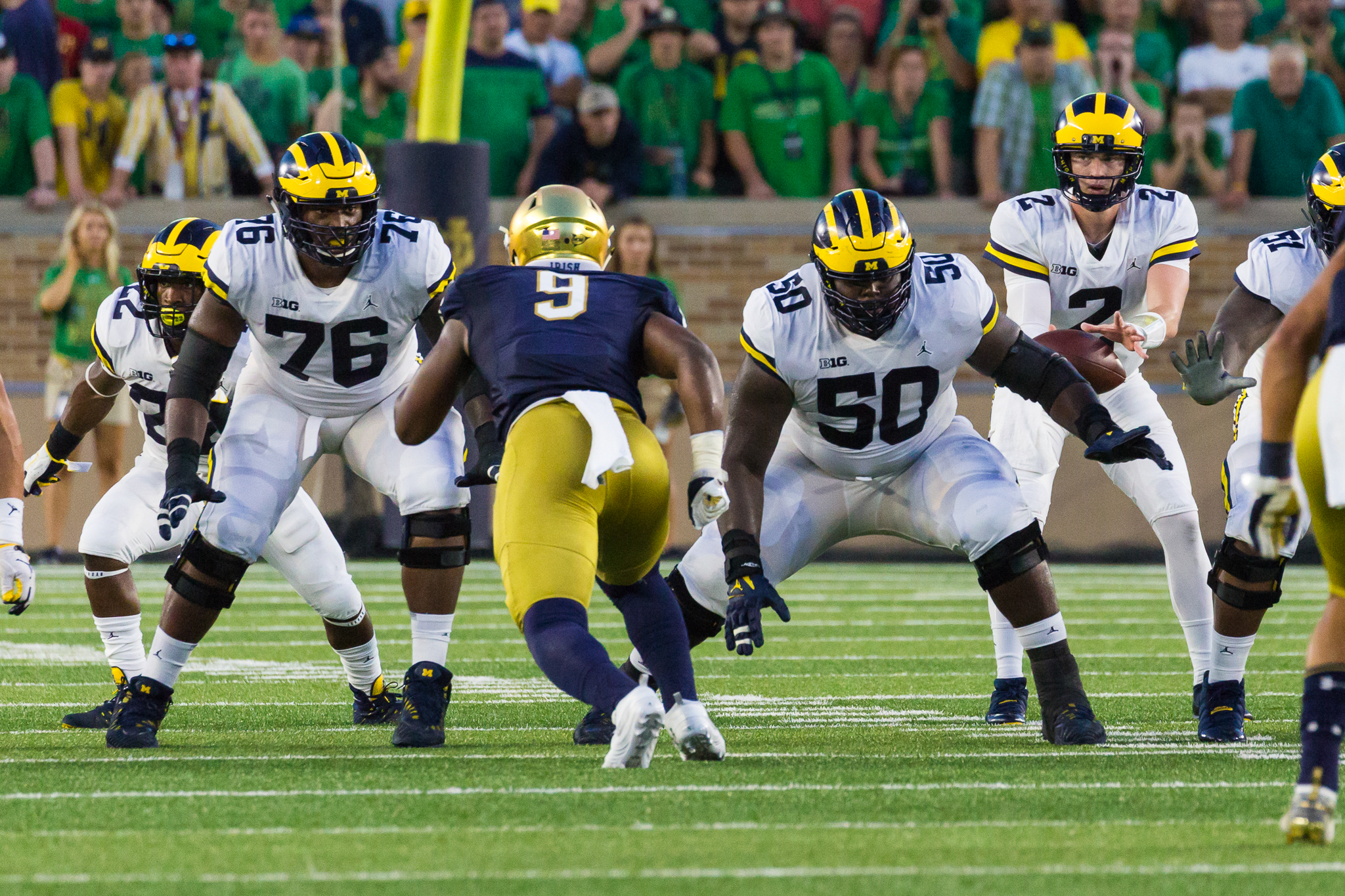
Hayes with Notre Dame in 2018

Hayes played five seasons for the Notre Dame Fighting Irish and joined the team as an early enrollee. He became a starter as a sophomore after being part of Notre Dame's defensive line rotation as a freshman. He recorded 31 tackles and two sacks with a forced fumble as a junior. Hayes suffered a shoulder injury four games into his senior season and used a medical redshirt. Hayes returned for a fifth season and finished the year with 17 tackles, six tackles for loss, and three sacks with an interception and two forced fumbles.

== Professional career ==
Pre-draft measurables
Height	Weight	Arm length	Hand span	40-yard dash	10-yard split	20-yard split	20-yard shuttle	Three-cone drill	Vertical jump	Broad jump	Bench press
6 ft 3 1/2 in (1.92 m)	253 lb (115 kg)	32 7/8 in (0.84 m)	9 3/8 in (0.24 m)	4.75 s	1.70 s	2.78 s	4.30 s	7.21 s	32.5 in (0.83 m)	9 ft 11 in (3.02 m)	26 reps
All values from Pro Day

=== Baltimore Ravens ===
Hayes was drafted in the fifth round, 171st overall, of the 2021 NFL draft by the Baltimore Ravens. On May 12, 2021, Hayes officially signed with the Ravens. He was placed on injured reserve with an ankle injury he suffered in Week 3 game against the Detroit Lions on September 27, 2021. He was activated on December 25, 2021. He was placed back on injured reserve on January 1, 2022.

On August 30, 2022, Hayes was waived/injured by the Ravens and placed on injured reserve. On May 22, 2023, he was waived by the Ravens.

=== San Francisco 49ers ===
On August 4, 2023, Hayes signed with the San Francisco 49ers. He was waived/injured eight days later.

== Career statistics ==
=== NFL ===
Year	Team	Games		Tackles					Interceptions						Fumbles		
Year	Team	GP	GS	Total	Solo	Ast	Sck	Sfty	PD	Int	Yds	Avg	Lng	TD	FF	FR	TD
2021	BAL	1	0	0	0	0	0.0	0	0	0	0	0.0	0	0	0	0	0
Career		1	0	0	0	0	0.0	0	0	0	0	0.0	0	0	0	0	0

=== College ===
Year	Team	Games		Tackles				Interceptions				Fumbles		
Year	Team	GP	GS	Total	Solo	Ast	Sack	PD	Int	Yds	TD	FF	FR	TD
2016	Notre Dame	12	0	11	5	6	0.0	1	0	0	0	1	0	0
2017 |	Notre Dame	13	12	30	17	13	3.0	1	0	0	0	0	2	0
2018	Notre Dame	12	1	31	15	16	2.0	1	0	0	0	0	1	0
2019	Notre Dame	4	0	6	5	1	1.0	0	0	0	0	0	1	0
2020	Notre Dame	12	12	17	12	5	3.0	1	1	13	0	2	1	0
Career		53	25	95	54	41	9.0	4	1	13	0	3	5	0
