= Greg Hudson =

American football player and coach (born 1967)

Biographical details
- Born: February 4, 1967 (age 59); Cincinnati, Ohio
- Education: Cincinnati (OH) Archbishop Moeller

Playing career
- 1986–1987: Notre Dame
- Position: Linebacker

Coaching career (HC unless noted)
- 1991–1992: Redlands (LB)
- 1993: Notre Dame (GA)
- 1994–1996: UConn (OL)
- 1997: Cincinnati (T]/OL)
- 1998: Cincinnati (RB)
- 1999–2000: Cincinnati (AHC/LB)
- 2001–2002: Minnesota (LB/RC)
- 2003–2004: Minnesota (DC/LB/RC)
- 2005–2009: East Carolina (DC/LB)
- 2010–2012: Florida State (AHC/LB)
- 2013–2015: Purdue (DC)
- 2016: Notre Dame (DC)

Gregory William Hudson (born February 4, 1967) is an American college football coach and former player. He is a former defensive coordinator for the Notre Dame Fighting Irish football team. He has also served as a defensive assistant at Minnesota, Cincinnati, Connecticut, East Carolina, Purdue and the linebackers coach at Florida State.

== College career ==
Hudson played college football at Notre Dame, where he played linebacker. Hudson was also a catcher on the Fighting Irish baseball team.

== Coaching career ==
Hudson was named the defensive coordinator at Purdue University in January, 2013. His salary was $395,000 annually. In 2016, Hudson joined the University of Notre Dame football team as a defensive analyst. On September 25, 2016, Hudson was named interim defensive coordinator at Notre Dame, following the firing of defensive coordinator Brian VanGorder.

== Statistics ==
Team defensive statistics where Hudson was defensive coordinator.

		Total Defense	Passing Defense	Rushing Defense	Ref
2004	Minnesota	80th	110th	48th	
2005	East Carolina	82nd	18th	114th	
2006	East Carolina	59th	40th	69th	
2007	East Carolina	96th	113th	53rd	
2008	East Carolina	63rd	68th	72nd	
2009	East Carolina	100th	116th	39th	
2013	Purdue	95th	33rd	116th	
2014	Purdue	83rd	56th	96th	
2015	Purdue	111th	88th	107th	
2016	Notre Dame	44th	24th	70th	
