= Allison Kucharczyk =

American social media content creator

- Education: Michigan State University
- Occupation: Content creator
- Spouse: Isaac Rochell (m. 2020)
- Children: 2

Allison Kucharczyk (aka Allison Kuch) is an American social media content creator and former interior designer. She creates online content about her personal life, parenting, and her experiences as the spouse of former National Football League (NFL) player Isaac Rochell. Allison has 2 daughters-Scottie Bee and Pepper Jo.

== Education ==
Kucharczyk attended Michigan State University for her undergraduate studies.

== Career ==
Kucharczyk began her professional career as an interior designer. She later transitioned to social media content creation, where she documents aspects of her life, including her relationship with her husband, National Football League (NFL) player Isaac Rochell, and her experiences as the spouse of a professional athlete.

As of June 2024, Kucharczyk is based in Orange County, California, and creates content focusing on family life, parenting, and personal finance. In 2024, she gained attention for a video discussing the financial benefits of breastfeeding.

Kucharczyk has collaborated with NBC Sports and participated in NFL-related events, including content documenting stadium experiences and fan interactions. In January 2024, she and her husband signed with United Talent Agency to pursue projects in unscripted television and other media ventures.

== Personal life ==
Kucharczyk met Isaac Rochell while attending college and maintained a long-distance relationship with him during their studies and the early years of his NFL career. The couple married in December 2020 and had a daughter, in December 2023, and another daughter in April 2026.
