= James Onwualu =

American football player (born 1994)

No. 58, 59
- Position: Linebacker

Personal information
- Born: September 4, 1994 (age 32); Saint Paul, Minnesota, U.S.
- Listed height: 6 ft 1 in (1.85 m)
- Listed weight: 235 lb (107 kg)

Career information
- High school: Cretin-Derham Hall (Saint Paul)
- College: Notre Dame (2013–2016)
- NFL draft: 2017: undrafted

Career history
- Los Angeles Chargers (2017); San Francisco 49ers (2018); Jacksonville Jaguars (2019); Carolina Panthers (2020)*; Las Vegas Raiders (2020)
- * Offseason or practice squad member only

Career NFL statistics
- Total tackles: 10
- Forced fumbles: 1
- Stats at Pro Football Reference

James Onwualu (born September 4, 1994) is an American former professional football player who was a linebacker in the National Football League (NFL). He played college football for the Notre Dame Fighting Irish.

== College career ==
Onwualu started his college career at Notre Dame as a wide receiver before switching to linebacker during his sophomore season in 2014. As a senior co-captain, he registered 75 tackles, three sacks, and led the team with 11.5 tackles for loss.

== Professional career ==
=== Los Angeles Chargers ===
Onwualu signed with the Los Angeles Chargers as an undrafted free agent on May 1, 2017. He played in nine games after making the initial 53-man roster before being waived on December 16, 2017 and re-signed to the practice squad. He signed a reserve/future contract with the Chargers on January 1, 2018.

On August 22, 2018, Onwualu was waived/injured by the Chargers and was placed on injured reserve. He was released on August 25, 2018.

=== San Francisco 49ers ===
On November 19, 2018, Onwualu was signed to the San Francisco 49ers practice squad. He was promoted to the active roster on November 27, 2018. He was waived on April 29, 2019.

=== Jacksonville Jaguars ===
On April 30, 2019, Onwualu was claimed off waivers by the Jacksonville Jaguars. He was placed on injured reserve on August 9, 2019, with a knee injury.

=== Carolina Panthers ===
After becoming a free agent in March 2020, Onwualu had a tryout with the Carolina Panthers on August 19, 2020. He signed with the team on September 2, 2020, but was waived three days later.

=== Las Vegas Raiders ===
On October 27, 2020, Onwualu was signed to the Las Vegas Raiders' practice squad. He was elevated to the active roster on December 26 and January 2, 2021, for the team's weeks 16 and 17 games against the Miami Dolphins and Denver Broncos, and reverted to the practice squad after each game. He signed a reserve/future contract on January 5, 2021.

On August 2, 2021, Onwualu announced his retirement from the NFL.
