= Jonathan Jones (Canadian football) =

American gridiron football player (born 1997)

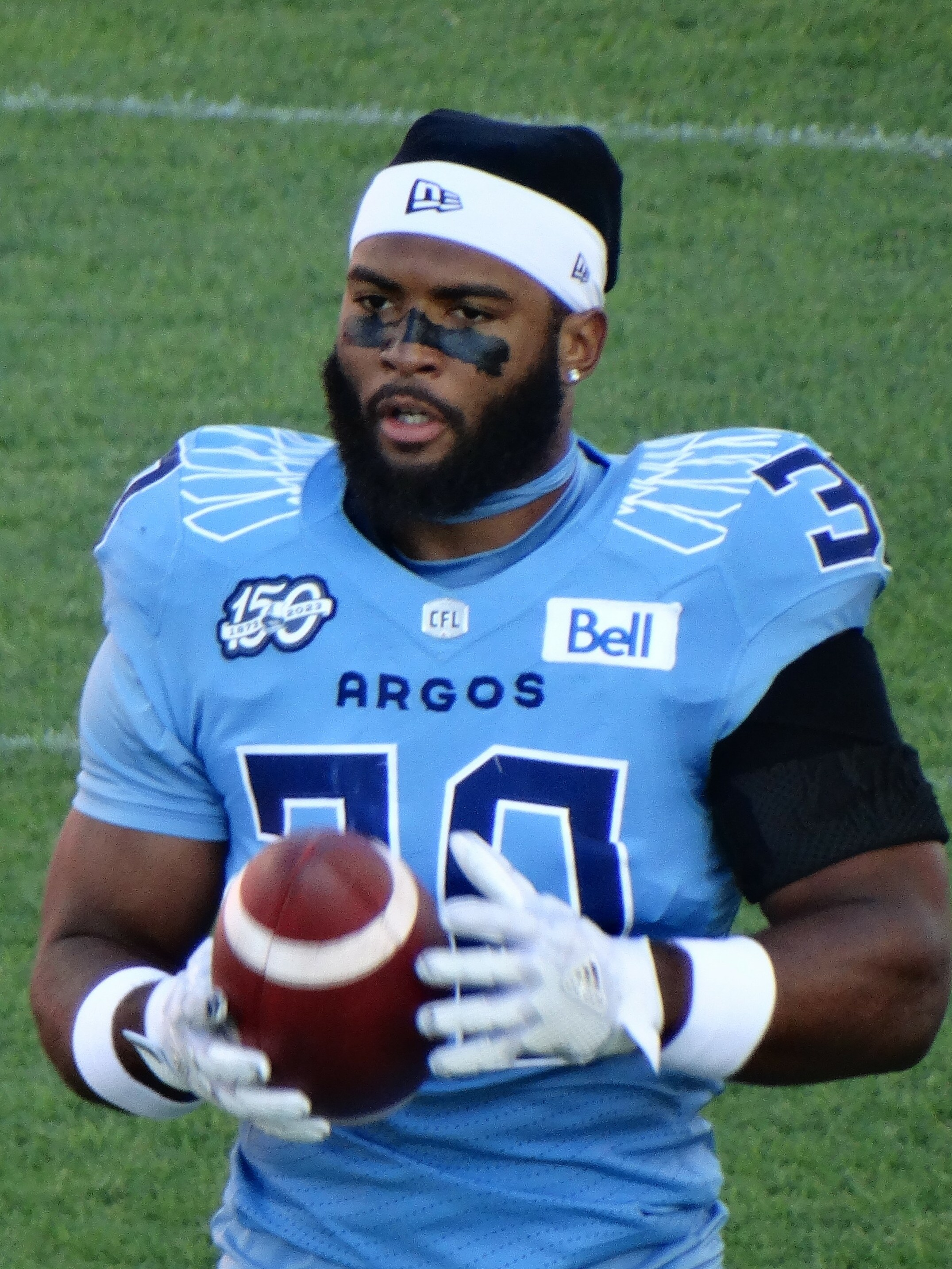
- Jones with the Toronto Argonauts in 2023

Profile
- Position: Linebacker

Personal information
- Born: November 18, 1997 (age 28); Ocoee, Florida, U.S.
- Listed height: 5 ft 11 in (1.80 m)
- Listed weight: 230 lb (104 kg)

Career information
- High school: Oak Ridge High
- College: Toledo (2020–2021); Notre Dame (2016–2019)

Career history
- 2022–2024: Toronto Argonauts
- 2025: Winnipeg Blue Bombers
- 2025: Ottawa Redblacks

Awards and highlights
- 2× Grey Cup champion (2022, 2024); Second-team All-MAC (2021)
- Stats at CFL.ca

Jonathan Carlos Jones (born November 18, 1997) is an American professional football linebacker. He most recently played for the Ottawa Redblacks of the Canadian Football League (CFL). He is a two-time Grey Cup champion after winning with the Toronto Argonauts in 2022 and 2024.

== College career ==
After using a redshirt season in 2016, Jones played college football for the Notre Dame Fighting Irish from 2017 to 2019 where he played in 28 games and recorded 16 total tackles. He then transferred to the University of Toledo as a graduate transfer to play for the Rockets in 2020 and 2021. In two years, he played in 19 games where he had 116 total tackles, four sacks, two forced fumbles, and two fumble recoveries.

== Professional career ==
=== Toronto Argonauts ===
On May 23, 2022, Jones signed with the Toronto Argonauts. Following 2022 training camp, he was placed on the team's practice roster, but made his professional debut on June 25, 2022, against the BC Lions, where he recorded one special teams tackle. He returned to the active roster in week 8, but dislocated his shoulder and was placed on the team's injured list. Once healthy, he returned to the practice roster for two weeks.

Following an injury to the team's incumbent starting weak-side linebacker, Wynton McManis, Jones made his first career start on October 8, 2022, against the Lions, where he had one defensive tackle. He started the last four games of the regular season and finished the year having played in six regular season games where he had ten defensive tackles, five special teams tackles, one sack, and two interceptions. Due to his strong play, Jones remained in the lineup for the East Final against the Montreal Alouettes, despite McManis returning from injury, where he had three defensive tackles in his post-season debut. He also played in his the 109th Grey Cup where he had five defensive tackles and one special teams tackle in the Argonauts' 24–23 victory over the Winnipeg Blue Bombers.

In 2023, Jones played in all 18 regular season games, starting in eight, where he had 49 defensive tackles, 13 special teams tackles, seven sacks, and one interception. He also had one defensive tackle and one special teams tackle in the East Final loss to the Alouettes. In the 2024 season, Jones played in 12 regular season games, starting in six, but sat out the last five games of the regular season. He remained on the injured list while the Argonauts won another Grey Cup over the Blue Bombers in the 111th Grey Cup game.

On January 16, 2025, Jones was released by the Argonauts.

=== Winnipeg Blue Bombers ===
On January 30, 2025, it was announced that Jones had signed a one-year contract with the Winnipeg Blue Bombers. He played in three regular season games where he recorded two special teams tackles. He was later released on September 29, 2025.

=== Ottawa Redblacks ===
On October 9, 2025, Jones signed with the Ottawa Redblacks. He played in three games where he had six defensive tackles, six special teams tackles, and one sack. He became a free agent upon the expiry of his contract on February 10, 2026.

== Personal life ==
Jones was born to parents Charles and Sharma Jones.
