= John Shannon (long snapper) =

American footballer

No. 54
- Position: Long snapper

Personal information
- Listed height: 6 ft 2 in (1.88 m)
- Listed weight: 225 lb (102 kg)

Career information
- High school: Loyola Academy
- College: Notre Dame (2016–2019)

Awards and highlights
- Patrick Mannelly Award (2019)

John Shannon is an American former football long snapper who played for the Notre Dame Fighting Irish.

== Early life ==
Shannon attended Loyola Academy in Illinois and was one of 15 finalists for the Chris Rubio award, given to the nation's top long snapper in high school. He was part of the 2015 team that went 14–0 and won the state championship. He was the number one long snapper recruit by 247Sports.com and Scout.com.

== College career ==
Shannon joined University of Notre Dame in 2016, but did not see any action as a freshman. As a sophomore the following year, Shannon started all 13 games and was perfect on all 138 snaps. As a junior in 2018, he again appeared in all 13 games, and made two tackles on special teams. After his senior year in 2019, where he played in every game, made three tackles, and recovered a fumble, Shannon beat out finalists Liam McCullough and Steven Wirtel to be given the inaugural Patrick Mannelly Award, given to the best long snapper in the country. He was given the game ball after his fumble recovery against Stanford.

== Later and personal life ==
After going unselected in the 2020 NFL draft, Shannon pursued a career in law enforcement. His grandfather, Dan Shannon, was a four-year starter for Notre Dame and was named All-American as a senior.
