= Isaac Rochell =

American football player (born 1995)

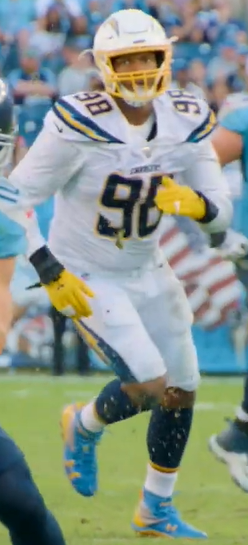
- Rochell with the Los Angeles Chargers in 2019

No. 98, 91, 95, 96
- Position: Defensive end

Personal information
- Born: April 22, 1995 (age 31); Corpus Christi, Texas, U.S.
- Listed height: 6 ft 4 in (1.93 m)
- Listed weight: 280 lb (127 kg)

Career information
- High school: Eagle's Landing Christian Academy (McDonough, Georgia)
- College: Notre Dame (2013–2016)
- NFL draft: 2017: 7th round, 225th overall pick

Career history
- Los Angeles Chargers (2017–2020); Indianapolis Colts (2021); Cleveland Browns (2022); Las Vegas Raiders (2022–2023)

Career NFL statistics
- Total tackles: 113
- Sacks: 9.5
- Forced fumbles: 1
- Interceptions: 1
- Stats at Pro Football Reference

Isaac Christopher Rochell (born April 22, 1995) is an American former professional football player who was a defensive end in the National Football League (NFL). He played college football for the Notre Dame Fighting Irish, and was selected in the seventh round of the 2017 NFL draft by the Los Angeles Chargers. Rochell also played for the Indianapolis Colts, Cleveland Browns, and Las Vegas Raiders.

== Early life ==
Rochell was born to parents Steve and Gina Rochell.

== College career ==
A three-year starter at the University of Notre Dame, Rochell's performance was strong his junior year but faded near the end of his senior year. He recorded slightly fewer tackles but had a sack and ten quarterback hurries. Rochell was noted for his consistency and work ethic even when the Fighting Irish were not finding success on the field.

== Professional career ==
Pre-draft measurables
Height	Weight	Arm length	Hand span	40-yard dash	10-yard split	20-yard split	Vertical jump	Broad jump	Bench press
6 ft 4 1/4 in (1.94 m)	280 lb (127 kg)	32 3/4 in (0.83 m)	9 3/4 in (0.25 m)	4.89 s	1.72 s	2.87 s	31.5 in (0.80 m)	9 ft 6 in (2.90 m)	25 reps
All values from NFL Combine

=== Los Angeles Chargers ===
Rochell was selected by the Los Angeles Chargers in the seventh round (225th overall) in the 2017 NFL draft. He was waived on September 13, 2017, and re-signed to the practice squad. He was promoted to the active roster on December 12, 2017.

Rochell re-signed with the Chargers on April 21, 2020. In December, he received the Chargers' nomination for the Walter Payton Man of the Year award.

=== Indianapolis Colts ===
Rochell signed with the Indianapolis Colts on March 22, 2021.

=== Cleveland Browns ===
On April 20, 2022, Rochell signed with the Cleveland Browns. The Browns terminated Rochell's contract on August 31. He was re-signed to the Browns' practice squad on September 1. He was promoted to the active roster on September 21. Rochell was waived on November 12. He was again re-signed to the practice squad three days later. Rochell terminated his practice squad contract on December 28.

=== Las Vegas Raiders ===
On December 28, 2022, Rochell signed with the Las Vegas Raiders, just hours after terminating his practice-squad contract with the Browns.

On July 24, 2023, Rochell re-signed with the Raiders. He was released on August 29 and re-signed to the practice squad. Rochell was elevated to the active roster for Week 1 game against the Denver Broncos and Week 2 against the Buffalo Bills, then reverted to the practice squad the day after the Buffalo game. On September 23, Rochell was promoted to the active roster. He was released on November 14.

=== Retirement ===
On February 2, 2025, Rochell announced his retirement from professional football.

On July 25, 2025, Rochell signed a one-day contract with the Los Angeles Chargers to retire with the team where he started his NFL career.

== Personal life ==
Rochell is married to Allison Kucharczyk. She is a TikTok content creator with over 3 million followers. They have two daughters, Scottie Bee and Pepper Jo.
