= Jamir Jones =

American football player (born 1998)

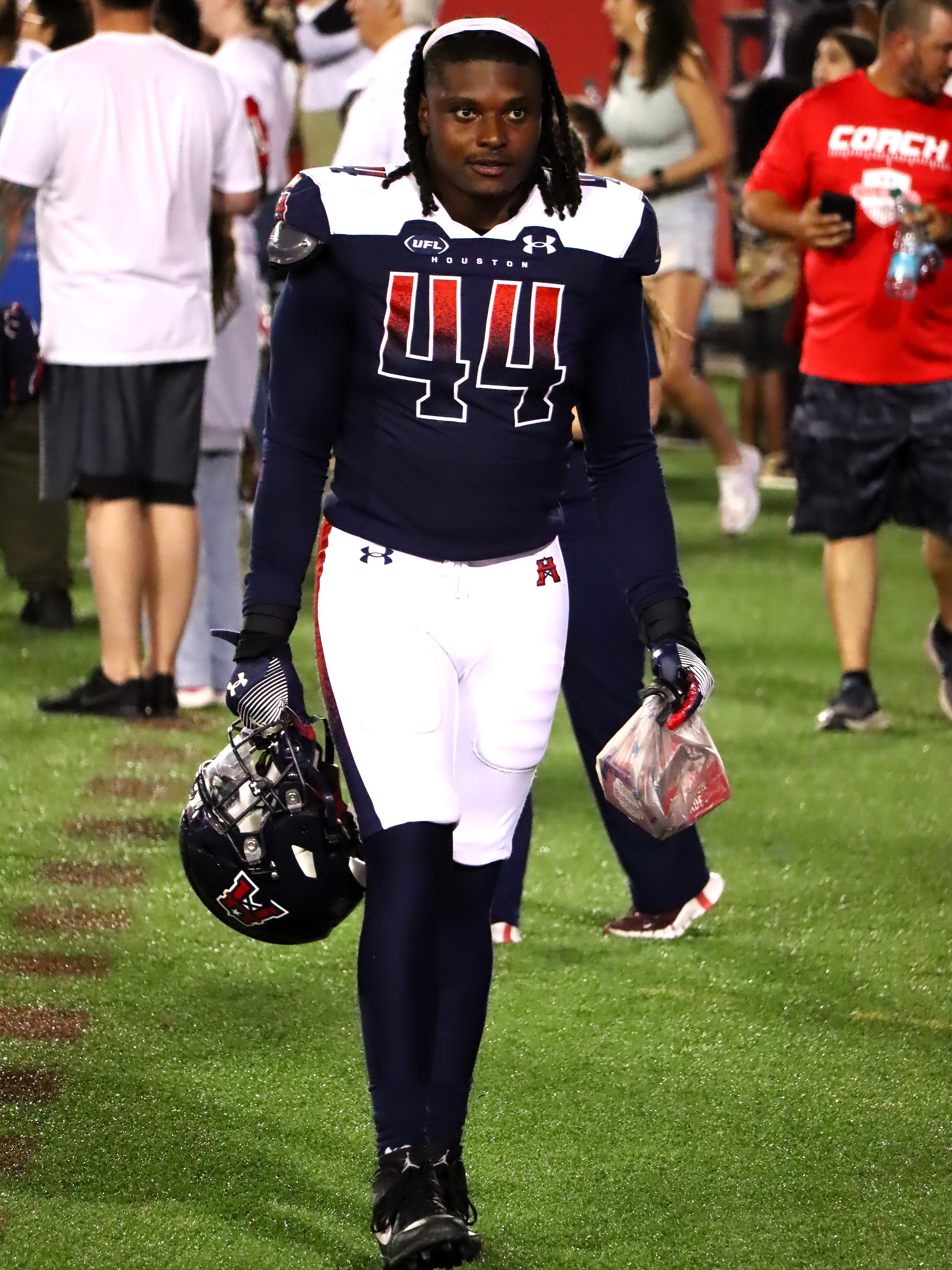
- Jones with the Houston Roughnecks in 2025

No. 44, 40, 48
- Position: Linebacker

Personal information
- Born: June 14, 1998 (age 28); Rochester, New York, U.S.
- Listed height: 6 ft 3 in (1.91 m)
- Listed weight: 255 lb (116 kg)

Career information
- High school: Aquinas Institute (Rochester)
- College: Notre Dame (2016–2019)
- NFL draft: 2020: undrafted

Career history
- Houston Texans (2020)*; Pittsburgh Steelers (2021); Los Angeles Rams (2021); Jacksonville Jaguars (2021); Pittsburgh Steelers (2022); San Antonio Brahmas (2024); Houston Roughnecks (2025)
- * Offseason or practice squad member only

Career NFL statistics
- Total tackles: 20
- Pass deflections: 1
- Stats at Pro Football Reference

Jamir Kyrie Jones (born June 14, 1998) is an American former professional football player who was a linebacker in the National Football League (NFL). He played college football for the Notre Dame Fighting Irish. He played in the NFL for the Pittsburgh Steelers, Los Angeles Rams, and Jacksonville Jaguars.

== College career ==
Jones played four years at Notre Dame University, appearing in 55 games during his four seasons. As a senior in 2019, he played in 11 games and finished with 50 tackles, seven and a half for a loss, and four and a half sacks. He also forced two fumbles and recovered another.

== Professional career ==
Pre-draft measurables
Height	Weight	Arm length	Hand span	Wingspan
6 ft 3 in (1.91 m)	248 lb (112 kg)	32 1/4 in (0.82 m)	9 1/4 in (0.23 m)	6 ft 6 3/8 in (1.99 m)
All values from Pro Day

=== Houston Texans ===
On April 30, 2020, Jones was signed by the Houston Texans as an undrafted free agent and was waived on July 28.

=== Pittsburgh Steelers (first stint) ===
On April 7, 2021, Jones signed with the Pittsburgh Steelers after catching Mike Tomlin and Kevin Colbert's attention in Notre Dame's 2021 Pro Day. Through training camp, he turned heads with his consistent motor and hustle and by regularly winning his one on one confrontations during drills and scrimmages. In preseason, he continued his strong play with four QB sacks in four games and by leading the NFL with six quarterback hits and thirteen total QB pressures while also leading the Steelers with six special teams tackles, earning a place in the 53-man roster. He was waived on September 28, 2021.

=== Los Angeles Rams ===
On September 29, 2021, Jones was claimed off waivers by the Los Angeles Rams. He was waived on December 25.

=== Jacksonville Jaguars ===
On December 27, 2021, Jones was claimed off waivers by the Jacksonville Jaguars. He was waived on August 31, 2022.

=== Pittsburgh Steelers (second stint) ===
On September 1, 2022, Jones was claimed off waivers by the Pittsburgh Steelers. He played in all 17 games for the Steelers, logging one pass deflection and ten total tackles. On February 27, 2023, Jones re–signed with the Steelers on a one–year contract.

On April 12, 2023, Jones was released by the Steelers, following an April 11 arrest for battery in a domestic violence case in Ft. Lauderdale, Florida. The charges were withdrawn by August 2023.

=== San Antonio Brahmas ===
On December 15, 2023, Jones was signed by the San Antonio Brahmas of the XFL. He was released on April 30, 2024.

=== Houston Roughnecks ===
On July 23, 2024, Jones signed with the Houston Roughnecks of the United Football League (UFL).

=== Louisville Kings ===
On January 13, 2026, Jones was selected by the Louisville Kings in the 2026 UFL Draft.

On January 27, 2026, James Larsen of Pro Football Newsroom, posted on X that Jones had announced his retirement "over the weekend".
