= Australians in American football =

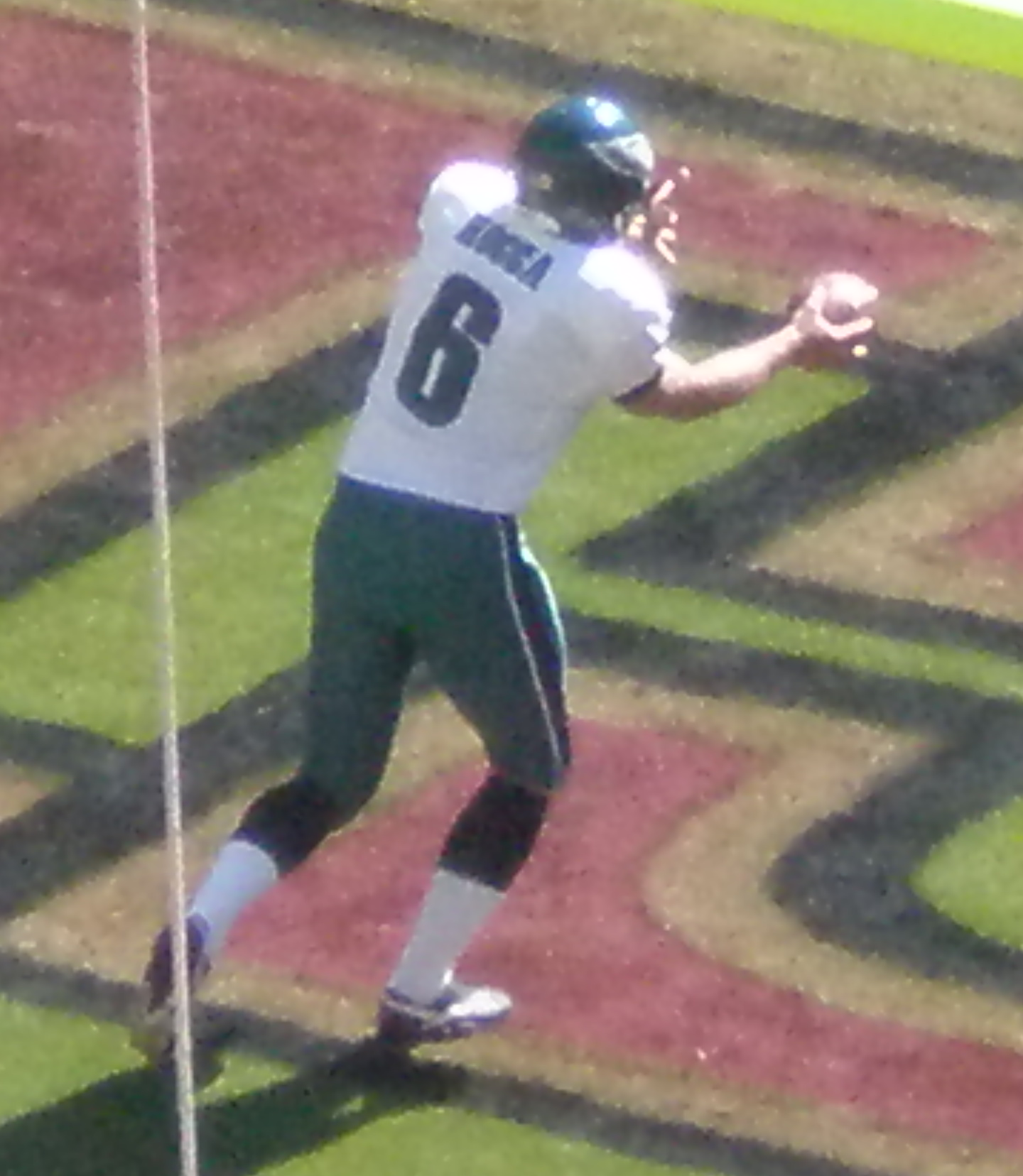
Former Australian rules footballer Saverio Rocca on the field prior to a game against the San Francisco 49ers on 12 October 2008

Australians in American football include not just a number of successful football code converts, but also a number of players with high profiles either before or as a result of their switching codes.

In Australia, there is an almost equal fascination, among the media and general public, of players linked to the National Football League (NFL) as there is for the Irish experiment.

Although Australians have participated at the highest level of American football, since the success of Darren Bennett as a punter and more recently Ben Graham, several athletes from Australian rules football, rugby league and rugby union have been linked to potential NFL careers.

The punting specialist position requires similar skills to those used in Australian Rules football. Salaries are up to five times higher and the position lends itself to longevity: Australian football players generally retire at around 30, whereas American football punters can play well into their 40s (Darren Bennett played 11 seasons in the NFL after leaving an Australian rules career when he was nearing 30). Initially Australians sought out American football careers, although now NFL scouts are more often actively seeking punters from Australia.

The first Australian to play American Football at a meaningful level was former Australian rules footballer Pat O'Dea in 1896 who was a College Football Hall of Fame and All-American player who set many kicking records

Gridiron in Australia is only at amateur level, so the pathway for Australians to NFL teams is typically limited to other professional Australian sports. For almost a decade, the NFL has placed full-time development officers in Australia, including Australian rules football hopeful Dwayne Armstrong. There is a full-time punting academy in Australia, Prokick Australia, run by former NFL free agent Nathan Chapman, which is aimed at training and assessing talented punters from Australia for positions in major U.S. colleges and the NFL.

More recently, the Ray Guy Award, presented to the top punter in NCAA Division I FBS football, was won by Australians six times in the last seven seasons of the 2010s—by Tom Hornsey in 2013, Tom Hackett in 2014 and 2015, Mitch Wishnowsky in 2016, Michael Dickson in 2017, Max Duffy in 2019, and Tory Taylor in 2023. Hornsey played for the University of Memphis, Hackett and Wishnowsky for the University of Utah, Dickson for the University of Texas, Duffy for the University of Kentucky, and Taylor for the University of Iowa. In the 2018 season, 30 FBS teams and about 35 teams in the second-tier Division I FCS had Australian punters.

== Australian sportsmen recruited by NFL teams ==
a) brought to the US by an NFL team
b) spent time training with an NFL team
c) played in an NFL pre-season game
d) offered an NFL contract by a team
e) spent time on an NFL roster

Australian sportsmen highlighted in blue played at least one game in the NFL
Australian sportsmen highlighted in green are currently on an NFL roster
Australian sportsmen highlighted in yellow are currently on an NFL practice squad

Recruited	Player	Original sport(s)	College team	Position	Initial NFL team	NFL debut	NFL games played	Notes
2026	Brett Thorson	Australian rules football	Georgia Bulldogs	P	Minnesota Vikings			
2026	Jack Bouwmeester	Cricket Soccer	Texas Longhorns	P	San Francisco 49ers			
2025	Laki Tasi	Rugby league Rugby union	International Player Pathway	G	Las Vegas Raiders			
2025	Luke Felix-Fualalo	Rugby union	Hawaii Rainbow Warriors	OT	Seattle Seahawks			
2025	Jeremy Crawshaw	Australian rules football Rugby league	Florida Gators	P	Denver Broncos	2025	17	
2025	James Burnip	Australian rules football	Alabama Crimson Tide	P	New Orleans Saints			
2024	Thomas Yassmin	Rugby union	Utah Utes	TE	Denver Broncos			
2024	Laekin Vakalahi	Basketball Rugby league	International Player Pathway	OT	Philadelphia Eagles			
2024	Tory Taylor	Australian rules football	Iowa Hawkeyes	P	Chicago Bears	2024	34	
2024	Matthew Hayball	Australian rules football	Vanderbilt Commodores	P	New Orleans Saints	2024	17	
2024	Nik Constantinou	Australian rules football	Texas A&M Aggies	P	Denver Broncos			
2023	Patrick Murtagh	Australian rules football	International Player Pathway	TE	Detroit Lions			Invited to NFL’s IPP international scouting combine in London. Following the combine was selected to take part in a training camp at the IMG Academy in Florida. Assigned by IPP to Detroit Lions on May 4, 2023.
2023	Lou Hedley	Australian rules football	Miami Hurricanes	P	New Orleans Saints	2023	17	Signed by New Orleans as an undrafted free agent on April 30 2023.
2022	Daniel Faalele	Rugby union	Minnesota Golden Gophers	G	Jacksonville Jaguars	2022	66	Drafted by the Baltimore Ravens in the fourth round, 110th overall, of the 2022 NFL Draft. On August 19, 2026, Faalele was traded to the Jacksonville Jaguars for a 2027 sixth-round pick.
2021	Max Duffy	Australian rules football	Kentucky Wildcats	P	Denver Broncos			Signed with the Broncos as an undrafted free agent on 24 May 2021. He was waived on 17 June. after the Toronto Argonauts selected Duffy in the fourth round of the 2021 CFL global draft on 15 April 2021. 34 games during his collegiate career at Kentucky University Duffy averaged 46 yards on his 151 collegiate punts, and he earned All-SEC honors in both 2019 and 2020. He also received a unanimous first-team All-American nod in 2019 and won the 2019 Ray Guy Award.
2020	Arryn Siposs	Australian rules football	Auburn Tigers	P	Detroit Lions	2021	32	Signed with the Eagles on January 13, 2021, and made his debut in Week 1 against the Atlanta Falcons.
2020	Matt Leo	Australian rules football Rugby league	Iowa State Cyclones	DE	Philadelphia Eagles			Signed to the Philadelphia Eagles practice September 6th, 2020, waived, placed on reserve/COVID-19 squad July 28th, 2021, activated September 8th, 2021 waved and resigned to the Eagles practice squad September 9th, 2021.
2019	Valentine Holmes	Rugby league	International Player Pathway	RB/KR	New York Jets			New York Jets Running Back/Punt Returner (2019)*
2019	Mitch Wishnowsky	Australian rules football	Utah Utes	P	San Francisco 49ers	2019	105	110th overall pick in the fourth round of the 2019 NFL draft.
2018	Jordan Mailata	Rugby league	International Player Pathway	OT	Philadelphia Eagles	2020	90	233rd overall pick in the seventh round of the 2018 NFL draft.
2018	Michael Dickson	Australian rules football	Texas Longhorns	P	Seattle Seahawks	2018	133	Drafted by the Seattle Seahawks in the fifth round, 149th overall, of the 2018 NFL draft.
2018	Keith Wrzuszczak	Pole vault	Eastern Kentucky Colonels	P	Indianapolis Colts			Wrzuszczak went undrafted in the 2018 NFL Draft. Was unsuccessful in competing for Colts punting spot. He averaged 41.4 yards per punt, which was six-best in the nation in 2017 and broke the 51-year-old EKU record of 78 yards with an 84-yard punt against Tennessee-Martin.
2017	Cameron Johnston	Australian rules football	Ohio State Buckeyes	P	Philadelphia Eagles	2018	100	Signed with the Philadelphia Eagles as an undrafted free agent on 11 May 2017. He was waived on 2 September 2017. He signed a reserve/future contract with the Eagles on 3 January 2018. Philadelphia Eagles (2017–2020) Houston Texans (2021–2023) Pittsburgh Steelers (2024–present)
2016	Adam Gotsis	Australian rules football	Georgia Tech Yellow Jackets	DT	Denver Broncos	2016	128	2nd Rnd, 63rd overall pick in the 2016 draft. The highest ever for an Australian. Fifth-year defensive end spent the first four seasons of his career in Denver before signing with Jacksonville Jaguars in August 2, 2020.
2016	Lac Edwards	Australian rules football	Sam Houston Bearkats	P	New York Jets	2016	74	235th overall pick in the seventh round at the 2016 NFL draft. New York Jets (2016–2019) Carolina Panthers (2021–present)
2016	Blake Muir	Gridiron football	Baylor Bears	OG/OT	Atlanta Falcons			Signed as an undrafted rookie with the San Francisco 49ers. Moved to the practice squad with the Green Bay Packers and then Atlanta Falcons in the 2016 season. Was part of the Falcons team that won the 2016 NFC Championship game and played in Super Bowl LI. Was All Big 12 in 2015 and honorable mention 2014 for Baylor Bears as an offensive lineman. Started all 37 games as a college player. Transferred from University of Hawai'i where he started 12 games at left tackle as a redshirt Freshman.
2016	Tom Hackett	Australian rules football	Utah Utes	P	New York Jets			Signed as an undrafted rookie on 1 May 2016 and waived on 28 July 2016 after the team re-signed quarterback Ryan Fitzpatrick. In Salt Lake City the 23-year-old won two Ray Guy Awards and earned two Consensus All-American selections and All-Pac-12 1st Team 2013, 2014, 2015 and named in the Pac-12 All-Century team.
2016	Joel Wilkinson	Australian rules football	None	DB	Arizona Cardinals			The Cardinals signed the 24-year-old, who used to play for the Gold Coast Suns, as a cornerback.
2015	Jarryd Hayne	Rugby league	None	RB	San Francisco 49ers	2015	8	3 March 2015, 49ers sign Hayne's as a running back (undrafted free agent), three-year contract with US$100,000 guarantee.
2015	Jordan Berry	Australian rules football Gridiron football	Eastern Kentucky Colonels	P	Pittsburgh Steelers	2015	108	Steelers sign punter Berry to their offseason roster in April. Berry was a three-time All-OVC punter and part of a punting unit that ranked first in the OVC and fifth nationally (FCS) in net punting at 39.08 yards per punt in 2014. Pittsburgh Steelers (2015–2020) Minnesota Vikings (2021–present)
2015	Sam Irwin-Hill	Australian rules football	Arkansas Razorbacks	P	Indianapolis Colts			Colts sign punter Sam a two-time Ray Guy Award candidate on a tryout basis in the rookie mini-camp – undrafted free agent. Best known for his memorable 51-yard touchdown against Texas A&M in September 2014. Colts cut the Arkansas graduate and, after being waived by a couple of teams, he signed with San Diego Fleet in October 2018.
2014	Tom Hornsey	Australian rules football	Memphis Tigers	P	Dallas Cowboys			Hornsey went undrafted in the 2014 NFL Draft after winning the Ray Guy Award last season – presented annually to the nation's top college punter. Played preseason with Dallas Cowboys, waived 26 August 2014 after 2 games. Hornsey took part in the New York Jets' rookie minicamp in the spring of 2014. Cowboys re-Sign Hornsey as possible competition for restricted Jones – 17 February 2015
2014	Alex Dunnachie	Australian rules football	Hawaii Rainbow Warriors	P	New York Jets			Dunnachie went undrafted in the 2014 NFL Draft. Was unsuccessful in competing for Jet punting spot. He averaged 46.2 yards per punt, which was fourth-best in the nation in 2013. Dunnachie landed a spot punting for the SoCal Coyotes in a 1AAA league in the USA.
2013	Brad Wing	Australian rules football	LSU Tigers	P	New York Giants	2014	64	Wing went undrafted in the 2013 NFL Draft and was signed by Philadelphia Eagles. After being released by the Eagles – 25 August 2013, Wing played a preseason game with New England Patriots and Carolina Panthers. Added to Pittsburgh Steelers team roster for 2014 season on a 1-year/$420k contract, including an annual average salary of $420,000. He became the first Australian to throw for points in the NFL (threw a two-point conversion). 2016–17 season starts with the Giants giving Wing a 3-year/$6.425 million contract. Pittsburgh Steelers (2014) New York Giants (2015–2017)
2013	Jesse Williams	Gridiron football	Alabama Crimson Tide	DT	Seattle Seahawks			Williams was taken in the fifth round of the 2013 NFL Draft with the 137th overall selection by the Seattle Seahawks. Williams signed a 4-year/$2.37 million contract, including a $211,052 signing bonus, with $211,052 guaranteed, and an annual average salary of $592,763. First native Australian to win a Super Bowl ring after Seattle's victory in Super Bowl XLVIII . Williams was cut after the 2015 season after battling injury and cancer and failing to make a first team start.
2012	Hayden Smith	Basketball Rugby union	None	TE	New York Jets	2012	5	The New York Jets signed Smith on 3 April 2012, waived him on 31 August 2012 and signed him to their practice squad. On 27 October 2012, he was promoted to the active roster from the practice squad. He was released on 26 August 2013, following which he returned to playing Rugby Union.
2010	David King	Australian rules football	None	P	New England Patriots			He was signed by the New England Patriots 14 April 2010, but was waived 11 June 2010.
2010	Chris Bryan	Australian rules football	None	P	Green Bay Packers	2010	4	Contracted by the Green Bay Packers in 2010, Tampa Bay Buccaneers (2010) and New York Jets (2011)*
2007	Anthony Rocca	Australian rules football	None	P	Philadelphia Eagles			Signed with the Eagles, however got homesick and returned to Australia
2009	Jy Bond	Australian rules football	None	P	Miami Dolphins			contracted by the Miami Dolphins in 2009
2007	Sav Rocca	Australian rules football	None	P	Philadelphia Eagles	2007	112	Oldest ever rookie in the NFL. Rocca signed a 2-year/$2.24 million contract with the Washington Redskins in 2013, including a $325,000 signing bonus, $325,000 guaranteed, and an annual average salary of $1,120,000. Philadelphia Eagles (2007–2010) Washington Redskins (2011–2013)
2005	Ben Graham	Australian rules football	None	P	New York Jets	2005	99	First Australian to play in the Super Bowl. New York Jets (2005–2008), New Orleans Saints (2008), Arizona Cardinals (2008–2011) and Detroit Lions (2011–2012) where Graham signed a 1-year/$890k contract, including a $65,000 signing bonus, and an annual average salary of $890,000. New York Jets (2005–2008) New Orleans Saints (2008) Arizona Cardinals (2008–2011) Detroit Lions (2011–2012)
2004	Mat McBriar	Australian rules football	Hawaii Rainbow Warriors	P	Dallas Cowboys	2004	141	Went undrafted in 2003. Preseason game with Denver Broncos & Seattle Seahawks in 2003. First NFL game was with the Dallas Cowboys (2003–2011), Philadelphia Eagles (2012) and Pittsburgh Steelers (2013) and de-listed start of the 2014 season. Chargers added McBriar two-time Pro Bowler in December 2014 to a 1-year/$955,000 contract.
2006	David Lonie	Decathlon Javelin Pole vault Soccer Water polo ||California Golden Bears|| P || Washington Redskins || || || Signed by Washington as an undrafted free agent in May and released prior to start of season and spent rest of season out of football. In 2007 signed as a free agent by the Packers on 16 Feb, but suffered an ankle injury during the season, placed on injured reserve, then released in October.						
2004	Nathan Chapman	Australian rules football	None	P	Green Bay Packers			Contracted by the Green Bay Packers and played in 3 pre-season games. Rookie and senior mini-camps with the Chicago Bears.
1995	Darren Bennett	Australian rules football	None	P	San Diego Chargers	1995	159	Most successful Australian in the history of the NFL. Third highest average (4 punts) 59.50yrds San Diego vs Pittsburgh, 1 October 1995 (4–238) San Diego Chargers (1994–2003) Minnesota Vikings (2004–2005)
1987	Colin Scotts	Rugby union	Hawaii Rainbow Warriors	DT	Arizona Cardinals	1987	7	First Australian to receive an American College Football scholarship in the United States. Drafted by the St. Louis Cardinals in the 3rd round (70th overall) of the 1987 NFL Draft. Scott played as a defensive end and tight end in 1987 for the Arizona Cardinals.
1965	Colin Ridgway	High jump	None	P	Dallas Cowboys	1965	3	First Australian to play in the NFL. Ridgeway became the first High-jumper to clear seven-foot before accepting a track-and-field scholarship to what is now Lamar University.

== Professional Australian sportsmen trialled with NFL clubs ==
- Max Duffy (2021 - Denver Broncos)
- Anthony Rocca (2010)
- Nick Davis (2008)
- Nathan Chapman (2004)
- Wayne Carey (2002 – Dallas Cowboys)
- Richard Osborne (1994)
- Tony Campbell (1994)
- Mark Harris (1973)

== Professional Australian sportsmen public stating an interest in switching to NFL ==
(either during or after their Australian professional careers)

- Dustin Martin Dustin "Dusty" Martin was thinking of switching sports to go play overseas NFL. He thought about being a Quarterback in early 2015
- Jarryd Hayne
- Scott Harding
- Brendan Fevola
- Anthony Rocca
- Dustin Fletcher
- Cory Paterson
- Todd Carney
- Willie Mason
- Trent Croad
- Paul Wheatley
- Greg Inglis
- Josh Hunt

== Female players of American football ==
- Jacinda Barclay
- Richelle Cranston
