= Bath County High School =

Bath County High School can refer to either of the following US high schools:

- Bath County High School (Kentucky) in Owingsville, Kentucky
- Bath County High School (Virginia) in Hot Springs, Virginia
