= Jordan Berry =

Australian American football player (born 1991)

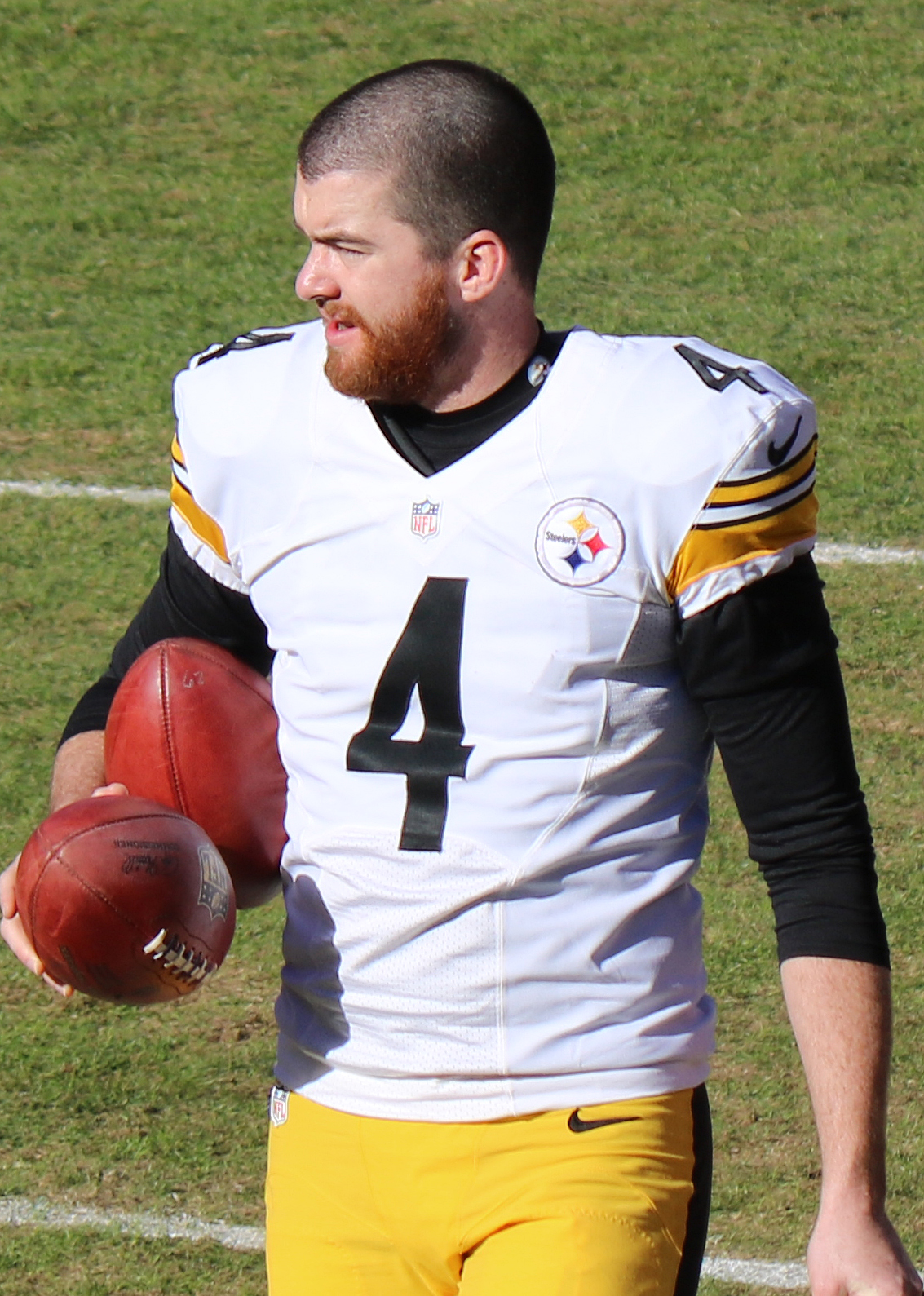
- Berry with the Pittsburgh Steelers in 2015

No. 4, 3
- Position: Punter

Personal information
- Born: 18 March 1991 (age 35); Essendon, Victoria, Australia
- Listed height: 6 ft 5 in (1.96 m)
- Listed weight: 195 lb (88 kg)

Career information
- High school: Melbourne (South Yarra, Victoria, Australia)
- College: Eastern Kentucky (2009–2013)
- NFL draft: 2014: undrafted

Career history
- Pittsburgh Steelers (2015–2020); Minnesota Vikings (2021); Pittsburgh Steelers (2022)*
- * Offseason or practice squad member only

Awards and highlights
- First-team All-OVC (2011); 2× Second-team All-OVC (2010, 2013)

Career NFL statistics
- Punts: 463
- Punt yardage: 20,728
- Average punt: 44.8
- Inside 20: 180
- Stats at Pro Football Reference

Jordan Thomas Berry (born 18 March 1991) is an Australian former professional American football punter. He played college football at Eastern Kentucky.

== Early life ==
Berry was born in Melbourne, Victoria, Australia. However he was moved to Brisbane, Queensland at a young age with his father. He played junior Australian rules football with Sherwood Districts Australian Football Club from the Under 9s (2000) to under 12s (2004) before returning to Melbourne with his family.

In Melbourne, Berry played under 18s football with the Aberfeldie Football Club in the Essendon District Football League. He also played with the Calder Cannons in the TAC Cup, a feeder club for the Australian Football League. Realising that he may not make the grade in the AFL, but in possession of a booming kick, he joined Prokick Australia and was signed on a scholarship to the US.

== College career ==
Berry played college football for Eastern Kentucky from 2009 to 2013. In 2010, he was named to the All-OVC second-team and the OVC All-Newcomer team. In 2011, Berry was named to the All-OVC first-team. In 2013, he was named to the All-OVC second-team.

== Professional career ==
Pre-draft measurables
Height	Weight	Arm length	Hand span
6 ft 5 1/8 in (1.96 m)	211 lb (96 kg)	31 3/8 in (0.80 m)	8 7/8 in (0.23 m)
All values from Pro Day

=== Pittsburgh Steelers (first stint) ===
Berry was signed by the Pittsburgh Steelers on April 14, 2015. After a preseason in which he punted 19 times for an average of 49.8 yards per punt, the Steelers traded incumbent punter Brad Wing to the New York Giants.

On February 1, 2018, Berry, who was due to become a restricted free agent, signed a one-year contract extension with the Steelers.

On March 13, 2019, Berry signed a two-year contract extension with the Steelers.

On September 7, 2020, Berry was released by the Steelers after the team signed Dustin Colquitt. He was re-signed on October 24, 2020.

Berry signed another one-year contract with the Steelers on March 29, 2021. He was released on August 26, after losing the starting job to rookie Pressley Harvin III.

=== Minnesota Vikings ===
On September 2, 2021, Berry signed a one-year deal worth $990,000 with the Minnesota Vikings. He re-signed with the team on March 16, 2022. Berry was released by the Vikings on August 25.

=== Pittsburgh Steelers (second stint) ===
On September 27, 2022, Berry was signed to the Steelers' practice squad. He was released on October 4.

== NFL career statistics ==
Legend
	Led the league
**Bold**	Career high

=== Regular season ===
Year	Team	Punting									
Year	Team	GP	Punts	Yds	Net Yds	Lng	Avg	Net Avg	Blk	Ins20	TB
2015	PIT	16	59	2,511	2,306	**79**	42.6	39.1	0	**28**	2
2016	PIT	16	68	3,100	2,771	64	45.6	40.2	**1**	25	3
2017	PIT	16	64	2,763	2,546	62	43.2	39.8	0	26	2
2018	PIT	16	63	2,753	2,446	69	43.7	38.8	0	**28**	**4**
2019	PIT	16	74	3,368	3,023	69	45.5	40.9	0	24	**4**
2020	PIT	11	57	2,609	2,307	62	45.8	40.5	0	23	3
2021	MIN	**17**	**78**	**3,624**	**3,225**	64	**46.5**	**41.3**	0	26	3
Career		108	463	20,728	18,624	79	44.8	40.1	1	180	21

=== Playoffs ===
Year	Team	Punting									
Year	Team	GP	Punts	Yds	Net Yds	Lng	Avg	Net Avg	Blk	Ins20	TB
2015	PIT	2	**13**	**531**	**435**	52	40.8	33.5	0	**4**	0
2016	PIT	**3**	7	268	239	47	38.3	**34.1**	0	2	0
2017	PIT	1	2	79	59	40	39.5	29.5	0	0	0
2020	PIT	1	3	125	97	**59**	**41.7**	32.3	0	1	0
Career		7	25	1,003	830	59	40.1	33.2	0	7	0

== Personal life ==
Berry's younger brother Wilson plays as a punter at the University of Kentucky starting in the 2021 season.

== See also ==
- Australians in American football
