= 2014 San Diego Chargers season =

NFL team 55th season

- Owner: Alex Spanos
- General manager: Tom Telesco
- Head coach: Mike McCoy
- Home stadium: Qualcomm Stadium

Results
- Record: 9–7
- Division place: 3rd AFC West
- Playoffs: Did not qualify
- All-Pros: 1: S Eric Weddle (1st team)
- Pro Bowlers: 2: ST Darrell Stuckey; S Eric Weddle

The 2014 season was the San Diego Chargers' 45th in the National Football League (NFL), their 55th overall and their second under head coach Mike McCoy. After former Chargers' offensive coordinator Ken Whisenhunt was hired by the Tennessee Titans to become their new head coach, the Chargers promoted Frank Reich to replace him. Reich spent the 2013 season as the Chargers' quarterbacks coach.

The Chargers began the season 5–1, winning five straight after losing their season opener. It was followed by a three-game losing streak, and they finished 4–4 in the second half. They won just two of their final five games, coming back from double-digit fourth quarter deficits twice to remain in playoff contention. They lost the final game of the season when a win would have secured a playoff berth. In three of their last four games, and five of their last eight, the Chargers did not score more than one touchdown (TD). Compared to 2013, the offense dropped in points (from 12th in the league to 17th), yards (5th to 18th), first downs (3rd to 15th), net yards per pass (2nd to 8th), rushing yards (13th to 30) and yards per rush (21st to 31st). It was the second time in three years the team finished second-to-last in yards per carry. San Diego was just 2–4 against teams in their division in the AFC West, and were swept by both the Denver Broncos and the Kansas City Chiefs. It was their worst intradivision record since they were 1–5 in 2003. The Chargers were only 3–6 against teams with winning records. They matched their 9–7 record from 2013, but missed the playoffs for the fourth time in five seasons.

Safety Eric Weddle was the team's lone selection to the Pro Bowl. Quarterback Philip Rivers was voted by the Chargers as their most valuable player after finishing the season with 4,286 yards passing, 31 TDs and 18 interceptions. During weeks 2–6, he became the first NFL player ever to have a passer rating over 120 for five consecutive games. Later in the season, Rivers suffered from sore ribs and a back injury, but he denied that they affected his performance. The team lost center Nick Hardwick and running back Danny Woodhead early in the season when they were placed on injured reserve. Running back Ryan Mathews also missed seven games early in the season. He and wide receiver Keenan Allen were sidelined during the final games of the season. For the season, the Chargers started five different players at center.

This was the last season the Chargers finished with a winning record while based in San Diego, as they would finish with a losing record the next two seasons and relocated to Los Angeles in the 2017 season.

== Offseason ==
=== Signings ===
Position	Player	2013 Team	Contract
RB	Donald Brown	Indianapolis Colts	3 years, $10.5 million
CB	Brandon Flowers	Kansas City Chiefs	1 year, $3 million
QB	Kellen Clemens	St. Louis Rams	2 years, $3 million
ILB	Kavell Conner	Indianapolis Colts	3 years, $2.7 million
TE	David Johnson	Pittsburgh Steelers	2 years, $1.7 million
RB	Ronnie Brown	Houston Texans	–

=== Departures ===
Position	Player	2014 Team
FB	Le'Ron McClain	Retired
QB	Charlie Whitehurst	Tennessee Titans
DT	Cam Thomas	Pittsburgh Steelers
WR	Vincent Brown	Oakland Raiders
OLB	Larry English	Tampa Bay Buccaneers
G	Steve Schilling	Seattle Seahawks

== NFL draft ==
2014 San Diego Chargers draft
Round	Pick	Player	Position	College	Notes
1	25	Jason Verrett *	CB	TCU	
2	50	Jeremiah Attaochu	LB	Georgia Tech	from Miami (Note: No. 50: Miami → San Diego (D). Miami traded this selection to San Diego in exchange for San Diego's second and fourth round selections (57th & 125th).)
3	89	Chris Watt	G	Notre Dame	
5	165	Ryan Carrethers	DT	Arkansas State	
6	201	Marion Grice	RB	Arizona State	
7	240	Tevin Reese	WR	Baylor	
Made roster † Pro Football Hall of Fame * Made at least one Pro Bowl during career

== Staff ==
2014 San Diego Chargers staff
Front office: Owner – Alex Spanos; Chairman/president – Dean Spanos; Executive vice president – Michael Spanos; Executive vice president/CEO – A. G. Spanos; General manager – Tom Telesco; Executive vice president of football operations – John Spanos; Executive vice president of football administration/player finance – Ed McGuire; Senior executive – Randy Mueller; Director of pro scouting – Dennis Abraham; Director of player personnel – JoJo Wooden; Director of college scouting – Kevin Kelly; Assistant director of pro scouting – Bryan Cox; Head coaches: Head coach – Mike McCoy; Offensive coaches: Offensive coordinator – Frank Reich; Quarterbacks – Nick Sirianni; Running backs – Ollie Wilson; Wide receivers – Fred Graves; Tight ends – Pete Metzelaars; Offensive line – Joe D'Alessandris; Assistant offensive line – Andrew Dees; Offensive quality control – Shane Steichen	Defensive coaches: Defensive coordinator – John Pagano; Defensive line – Don Johnson; Linebackers – Joe Barry; Assistant linebackers – Bobby King; Secondary – Ron Milus; Assistant secondary – Greg Williams; Defensive quality control – Chad Grimm; Special teams coaches: Special teams coordinator – Kevin Spencer; Assistant special teams – Craig Aukerman; Strength and conditioning: Strength and conditioning – Kent Johnson; Assistant strength and conditioning – Rick Lyle; Coaching administrative assistant – Mark Ridgley

== Final roster ==
2014 San Diego Chargers roster
Quarterbacks (QB): 10 Kellen Clemens; 17 Philip Rivers; Running backs (RB): 34 Donald Brown; 30 Ronnie Brown; 24 Ryan Mathews; 43 Branden Oliver; Wide receivers (WR): 16 Seyi Ajirotutu; 13 Keenan Allen; 80 Malcom Floyd; 15 Dontrelle Inman; 11 Eddie Royal; Tight ends (TE): 85 Antonio Gates; 89 Ladarius Green; 88 David Johnson; 83 John Phillips	Offensive linemen (OL): 62 Jeff Baca C; 77 King Dunlap T; 76 D. J. Fluker T; 78 Chad Rinehart G; 60 Trevor Robinson C; 75 Jeremiah Sirles G; 69 Willie Smith T; 79 Kenny Wiggins G; 65 Chris Watt C/G; Defensive linemen (DL): 92 Ryan Carrethers NT; 98 Sean Lissemore NT; 94 Corey Liuget DE; 90 Ricardo Mathews; 72 Tenny Palepoi DE; 91 Kendall Reyes DE; 71 Damion Square DE	Linebackers (LB): 97 Jeremiah Attaochu OLB; 53 Kavell Conner ILB; 93 Dwight Freeney OLB; 59 Andrew Gachkar ILB; 54 Melvin Ingram OLB; 96 Jarret Johnson OLB; 99 Cordarro Law OLB; 50 Manti Te'o ILB; 52 Reggie Walker ILB; 58 Tourek Williams OLB; Defensive backs (DB): 37 Jahleel Addae SS; 20 Chris Davis; 33 Greg Ducre CB; 26 Brandon Flowers CB; 38 Marcus Gilchrist SS; 25 Darrell Stuckey FS; 32 Eric Weddle FS; 23 Steve Williams CB; 29 Shareece Wright CB; Special teams (ST): 1 Mat McBriar P; 9 Nick Novak K; 47 Mike Windt LS	Practice squad: 27 D.J. Adams RB (IR); 70 Chas Alecxih DE; 3 Torrence Allen WR; 31 Richard Crawford CB; 8 Javontee Herndon WR; 81 David Paulson TE; 27 Adrian Phillips S; 68 Bryce Quigley G; 4 Brad Sorensen QB; 49 Colton Underwood LB; 64 Craig Watts G; Reserve: 56 Donald Butler ILB (IR); 66 Jeromey Clary G/T (PUP); 61 Nick Hardwick C (IR); 57 Doug Legursky C (IR); 74 Rich Ohrnberger C (IR); 75 Damik Scafe DE (IR); 48 Alvin Scioneaux ILB (IR); 5 Mike Scifres P (IR); 73 Ricky Tjong-A-Tjoe NT (IR); 63 Johnnie Troutman G (IR); 22 Jason Verrett CB (IR); 39 Danny Woodhead RB (IR); Rookies in italics 53 active, 13 reserve, 10 practice squad

== Schedule ==
=== Preseason ===
Week	Date	Opponent	Result	Record	Venue	Recap
1	August 7	Dallas Cowboys	**W** 27–7	1–0	Qualcomm Stadium	Recap
2	August 15	at Seattle Seahawks	**L** 14–41	1–1	CenturyLink Field	Recap
3	August 24	at San Francisco 49ers	**L** 7–21	1–2	Levi's Stadium	Recap
4	August 28	Arizona Cardinals	**W** 12–9	2–2	Qualcomm Stadium	Recap

=== Regular season ===
Week	Date	Opponent	Result	Record	Venue	Recap
1	September 8	at Arizona Cardinals	**L** 17–18	0–1	University of Phoenix Stadium	Recap
2	September 14	Seattle Seahawks	**W** 30–21	1–1	Qualcomm Stadium	Recap
3	September 21	at Buffalo Bills	**W** 22–10	2–1	Ralph Wilson Stadium	Recap
4	September 28	Jacksonville Jaguars	**W** 33–14	3–1	Qualcomm Stadium	Recap
5	October 5	New York Jets	**W** 31–0	4–1	Qualcomm Stadium	Recap
6	October 12	at **Oakland Raiders**	**W** 31–28	5–1	O.co Coliseum	Recap
7	October 19	**Kansas City Chiefs**	**L** 20–23	5–2	Qualcomm Stadium	Recap
8	October 23	at **Denver Broncos**	**L** 21–35	5–3	Sports Authority Field at Mile High	Recap
9	November 2	at Miami Dolphins	**L** 0–37	5–4	Sun Life Stadium	Recap
10	Bye					
11	November 16	**Oakland Raiders**	**W** 13–6	6–4	Qualcomm Stadium	Recap
12	November 23	St. Louis Rams	**W** 27–24	7–4	Qualcomm Stadium	Recap
13	November 30	at Baltimore Ravens	**W** 34–33	8–4	M&T Bank Stadium	Recap
14	December 7	New England Patriots	**L** 14–23	8–5	Qualcomm Stadium	Recap
15	December 14	**Denver Broncos**	**L** 10–22	8–6	Qualcomm Stadium	Recap
16	December 20	at San Francisco 49ers	**W** 38–35 (OT)	9–6	Levi's Stadium	Recap
17	December 28	at **Kansas City Chiefs**	**L** 7–19	9–7	Arrowhead Stadium	Recap

Note: Intra-division opponents are in bold text.

=== Game summaries ===
==== Week 1: at Arizona Cardinals ====
Week One: San Diego Chargers at Arizona Cardinals – Game summary

Quarter	1	2	3	4	Total
Chargers	0	3	14	0	**17**
**Cardinals**	0	6	0	12	**18**

at University of Phoenix Stadium, Glendale, Arizona

- Date: September 8
- Game time: 7:20 p.m. PDT
- Game weather: Played indoors (retractable roof closed)
- Game attendance: 61,292
- Referee: Bill Vinovich
- TV announcers (ESPN): Chris Berman, Trent Dilfer and Lindsay Czarniak
- Recap, Gamebook

Game information

**First quarter**

- No scoring plays.

**Second quarter**

- ARI – Chandler Catanzaro 22-yard field goal, 12:42. Cardinals 3–0. **Drive: 7 plays, 62 yards, 2:28.**
- SDG – Nick Novak 36-yard field goal, 6:00. Tied 3–3. **Drive: 4 plays, 1 yard, 1:18.**
- ARI – Chandler Catanzaro 44-yard field goal, 0:00. Cardinals 6–3. **Drive: 3 plays, 30 yards, 0:16.**

**Third quarter**

- SDG – Malcom Floyd 6-yard pass from Philip Rivers (Nick Novak kick), 11:38. Chargers 10–6. **Drive: 7 plays, 80 yards, 3:22.**
- SDG – Ryan Mathews 20-yard run (Nick Novak kick), 5:26. Chargers 17–6. **Drive: 3 plays, 29 yards, 1:17.**

**Fourth quarter**

- ARI – Stepfan Taylor 5-yard pass from Carson Palmer (run failed), 12:30. Chargers 17–12. **Drive: 10 plays, 64 yards, 4:43.**
- ARI – John Brown 13-yard pass from Carson Palmer (pass failed), 2:25. Cardinals 18–17. **Drive: 11 plays, 91 yards, 4:25.**

**Top passers**

- SDG – Philip Rivers – 21/36, 238 yards, TD, INT
- ARI – Carson Palmer – 24/37, 304 yards, 2 TD

**Top rushers**

- SDG – Ryan Mathews – 12 rushes, 40 yards, TD
- ARI – Andre Ellington – 13 rushes, 53 yards

**Top receivers**

- SDG – Antonio Gates – 6 receptions, 81 yards
- ARI – Michael Floyd – 5 receptions, 119 yards

Arizona Cardinals rookie receiver John Brown scored on a 13-yard pass from Carson Palmer with 2:25 left in the game to defeat San Diego 18–17 on Monday night. The Chargers led 17–6 after three periods, but did not convert on multiple opportunities throughout the game. It was the fifth loss for San Diego over the prior three seasons in which they led by a touchdown or more in the fourth quarter, tied for the most in the NFL.

Rookie Jeremiah Attaochu set up the Chargers only first-half score with a blocked punt off Drew Butler. San Diego trailed 6–3 at halftime when Chargers quarterback Philip Rivers went 6-for-6 for 82 yards and threw a 6-yard touchdown to Malcom Floyd for a 10–6 lead. Attaochu forced a Palmer fumble on a strip sack to set up a 20-yard touchdown run by Ryan Mathews for a 17–6 Charger advantage.

The Cardinals pulled to 17–12 after a 10-play, 64-yard touchdown drive with 12:30 remaining; their two-point conversion failed. On San Diego's following drive, they were in field-goal range at the Arizona 29-yard line when a mishandled snap from backup center Rich Ohrnberger—replacing an injured Nick Hardwick who left the game—to Rivers pushed the Chargers back to the 43 and forced a punt. Arizona then went on their 11-play, 91-yard game-winning drive, which was extended by a slow-footed Palmer scrambling 12 yards on a third-and-10 play.

The Chargers offense, which ranked fifth in the NFL in yards in 2013, suffered from uncharacteristic dropped passes. Arizona's late field goal in the second quarter came after a Chargers interception set up by Eddie Royal stopping on his route as a Rivers pass went to the Chiefs Jerraud Powers. The Chargers' Marcus Gilchrist dropped an apparent sure interception in the third quarter.

==== Week 2: vs. Seattle Seahawks ====
Week Two: Seattle Seahawks at San Diego Chargers – Game summary

Quarter	1	2	3	4	Total
Seahawks	7	7	7	0	**21**
**Chargers**	3	17	7	3	**30**

at Qualcomm Stadium, San Diego, California

- Date: September 14
- Game time: 1:05 pm. PDT
- Game weather: 94 °F (34 °C), sunny
- Game attendance: 67,916
- Referee: Pete Morelli
- TV announcers (Fox): Thom Brennaman, David Diehl and Laura Okmin
- Recap, Gamebook

Game information

**First quarter**

- SDG – Nick Novak 50-yard field goal, 2:52. Chargers 3–0. **Drive: 14 plays, 48 yards, 8:01.**
- SEA – Percy Harvin 51-yard run (Steven Hauschka kick), 1:27. Seahawks 7–3. **Drive: 3 plays, 60 yards, 1:25.**

**Second quarter**

- SDG – Antonio Gates 8-yard pass from Philip Rivers (Nick Novak kick), 12:05. Chargers 10–7. **Drive: 9 plays, 80 yards, 4:22.**
- SDG – Nick Novak 43-yard field goal, 4:40. Chargers 13–7. **Drive: 10 plays, 31 yards, 5:08.**
- SDG – Antonio Gates 8-yard pass from Philip Rivers (Nick Novak kick), 1:04. Chargers 20–7. **Drive: 6 plays, 28 yards, 3:30.**
- SEA – Robert Turbin 3-yard pass from Russell Wilson (Steven Hauschka kick), 0:12. Chargers 20–14. **Drive: 5 plays, 69 yards, 0:52.**

**Third quarter**

- SDG – Antonio Gates 21-yard pass from Philip Rivers (Nick Novak kick), 3:01. Chargers 27–14. **Drive: 12 plays, 75 yards, 6:24.**
- SEA – Marshawn Lynch 14-yard pass from Russell Wilson (Steven Hauschka kick), 0:03. Chargers 27–21. **Drive: 8 plays, 70 yards, 2:58.**

**Fourth quarter**

- SDG – Nick Novak 28-yard field goal, 0:16. Chargers 30–21. **Drive: 4 plays, −5 yards, 1:30.**

**Top passers**

- SEA – Russell Wilson – 17/25, 202 yards, 2 TD
- SDG – Philip Rivers – 28/37, 284 yards, 3 TD

**Top rushers**

- SEA – Percy Harvin – 2 rushes, 45 yards, TD
- SDG – Danny Woodhead – 8 rushes, 32 yards

**Top receivers**

- SEA – Jermaine Kearse – 4 receptions, 61 yards
- SDG – Antonio Gates – 7 receptions, 96 yards, 3 TD

Antonio Gates caught three touchdowns from Rivers to lead the Chargers to a 30–21 win over the defending Super Bowl champion Seattle Seahawks. San Diego held a 42:15 to 17:45 advantage in time of possession under hot weather conditions. The official game-time temperature was 94 °F (34 °C), while readings at field level read closer to 115 °F (46 °C). The Chargers had six drives of eight plays or more—including possessions of 14, 12, and 10 plays—while the Seahawks had one eight-play drive.

San Diego's first possession was a 14-play drive that led to a 50-yard field goal by Nick Novak, ending the Seahawks' 20-game streak without allowing a score on the opening possession. Following a 10-play field goal drive by the Chargers in the second quarter, linebacker Kavell Conner forced a fumble on the kickoff, which led to a six-play touchdown drive; the two drives combined to keep the Seahawks offense off the field for almost nine minutes. Gates' third touchdown came after he split two defenders and made a spectacular one-handed grab to give the Chargers a 27–14 lead late in the third quarter.

Rivers was 28-of-37 for 284 yards. He had thrown 65 touchdowns to Gates, the most between a quarterback and tight end in NFL history. The Chargers were 10-for-17 on third-down conversions, while the Seahawks were 3-for-8.

==== Week 3: at Buffalo Bills ====
Week Three: San Diego Chargers at Buffalo Bills – Game summary

Quarter	1	2	3	4	Total
**Chargers**	7	6	7	2	**22**
Bills	0	3	7	0	**10**

at Ralph Wilson Stadium, Orchard Park, New York

- Date: September 21
- Game time: 1:00 p.m. EDT/10:00 am. PDT
- Game weather: 72 °F (22 °C), partly cloudy
- Game attendance: 68,611
- Referee: John Parry
- TV announcers (CBS): Andrew Catalon, Steve Beuerlein and Steve Tasker
- Recap, Gamebook

Game information

**First quarter**

- SDG – Eddie Royal 3-yard pass from Philip Rivers (Nick Novak kick), 9:45. Chargers 7–0. **Drive: 7 plays, 75 yards, 3:18.**

**Second quarter**

- SDG – Nick Novak 19-yard field goal, 10:18. Chargers 10–0. **Drive: 7 plays, 89 yard, 7:51.**
- BUF – Dan Carpenter 45-yard field goal, 2:56. Chargers 10–3. **Drive: 8 plays, 65 yards, 2:58.**
- SDG – Nick Novak 37-yard field goal, 0:21. Chargers 13–3. **Drive: 7 plays, 61 yard, 2:35.**

**Third quarter**

- SDG – Eddie Royal 5-yard pass from Philip Rivers (Nick Novak kick), 7:31. Chargers 20–3. **Drive: 14 plays, 80 yards, 7:29.**
- BUF – Fred Jackson 11-yard pass from EJ Manuel (Dan Carpenter kick), 1:16. Chargers 20–10. **Drive: 11 plays, 67 yards, 6:15.**

**Fourth quarter**

- SDG – Safety, EJ Manuel penalized for intentional grounding in the end zone, 3:23. Chargers 22–10.

**Top passers**

- SDG – Philip Rivers – 18/25, 256 yards, 2 TD
- BUF – EJ Manuel – 23/39, 238 yards, TD

**Top rushers**

- SDG – Donald Brown – 31 rushes, 62 yards
- BUF – Fred Jackson – 6 rushes, 34 yards

**Top receivers**

- SDG – Malcom Floyd – 2 receptions, 98 yards
- BUF – Fred Jackson – 8 receptions, 78 yards, TD

Rivers threw two touchdowns to Royal and spread the ball to multiple receivers to lead San Diego to a 22–10 victory over the Buffalo Bills. The Chargers' defense held the Bills to just 19 yards and forced a safety in their first four series in the fourth quarter, denying Buffalo their third 3–0 start since 1993.

The Chargers led throughout the game after a 3-yard TD pass from Rivers to Royal with 9:45 left in the first quarter. They took control of the game after a 37-yard Novak field goal 21 seconds before the half, and a 5-yard TD catch by Royal to cap a 14-play, 80-yard drive to start the third quarter for a 20–3 lead, their largest of the game. San Diego held on for their third 2–1 start in five years. They did not have a first down in their final five drives after 20 in their first five.

After losing running back Mathews to a sprained ankle the previous week, the Chargers' Danny Woodhead did not return after his first carry of the game 3 1/2 minutes into the contest. Donald Brown filled in with 89 yards offense (62 rushing and 27 receiving). Rivers completed 18 of 25 passes for 256 yards, including two 49-yard catches by Floyd. Royal had four receptions for 42 yards, and backup tight end Ladarius Green finished with four catches for 64 yards. Novak extended his streak of consecutive successful field goal attempts to 23, passing Nate Kaeding for second in team history.

==== Week 4: vs. Jacksonville Jaguars ====
Week Four: Jacksonville Jaguars at San Diego Chargers – Game summary

Quarter	1	2	3	4	Total
Jaguars	0	14	0	0	**14**
**Chargers**	3	14	10	6	**33**

at Qualcomm Stadium, San Diego, California

- Date: September 28
- Game time: 1:05 pm. PDT
- Game weather: 73 °F (23 °C), sunny
- Game attendance: 56,553
- Referee: Clete Blakeman
- TV announcers (CBS): Andrew Catalon, Steve Beuerlein and Steve Tasker
- Recap, Gamebook

Game information

**First quarter**

- SDG – Nick Novak 33-yard field goal, 3:44. Chargers 3–0. **Drive: 7 plays, 36 yards, 3:08.**

**Second quarter**

- JAX – Toby Gerhart 1-yard run (Josh Scobee kick), 14:06. Jaguars 7–3. **Drive: 10 plays, 68 yards, 4:38.**
- SDG – Eddie Royal 47-yard pass from Philip Rivers (Nick Novak kick), 11:24. Chargers 10–3. **Drive: 5 plays, 83 yards, 2:42.**
- JAX – Nic Jacobs 2-yard pass from Blake Bortles (Josh Scobee kick), 7:17. Jaguars 14–10. **Drive: 7 plays, 76 yards, 4:07.**
- SDG – Eddie Royal 47-yard pass from Philip Rivers (Nick Novak kick), 0:59. Chargers 17–14. **Drive: 4 plays, 55 yards, 1:07.**

**Third quarter**

- SDG – Malcom Floyd 43-yard pass from Philip Rivers (Nick Novak kick), 11:09. Chargers 24–14. **Drive: 9 plays, 80 yards, 3:51.**
- SDG – Nick Novak 34-yard field goal, 6:10. Chargers 27–14. **Drive: 7 plays, 24 yards, 3:08.**

**Fourth quarter**

- SDG – Nick Novak 23-yard field goal, 13:35. Chargers 30–14. **Drive: 14 plays, 75 yards, 5:28.**
- SDG – Nick Novak 37-yard field goal, 1:09. Chargers 33–14. **Drive: 7 plays, 19 yards, 2:31.**

**Top passers**

- JAX – Blake Bortles – 29/37, 254 yards, TD, 2 INT
- SDG – Philip Rivers – 29/39, 377 yards, 3 TD

**Top rushers**

- JAX – Toby Gerhart – 10 rushes, 32 yards, TD
- SDG – Branden Oliver – 9 rushes, 23 yards

**Top receivers**

- JAX – Clay Harbor – 8 receptions, 70 yards
- SDG – Keenan Allen – 10 receptions, 135 yards

The Chargers defeated the winless Jacksonville Jaguars 33–14 as Rivers threw for 377 yards and three touchdowns. Royal caught two of the scoring passes for his second straight two-touchdown game. San Diego extended its winning streak to three.

After Jacksonville took a 7–3 lead on a Toby Gerhart 1-yard TD run early in the second quarter, Rivers spotted Royal—guarded by linebacker Geno Hayes—who got open for a 47-yard touchdown reception. Jaguars rookie Blake Bortles, making his first start, followed with a scoring pass to Nic Jacobs. Before halftime, Rivers found Royal on third-and-10 as the receiver outran defenders for 43-yard TD pass, staking San Diego to a 17–14 lead. Rivers connected with Floyd on a 24-yard TD pass to open the third quarter, and the Chargers' defense held the Jaguars scoreless in the second half. Cornerback Brandon Flowers and safety Eric Weddle each intercepted Bortles in the second half after the Jacksonville quarterback began the game 13-for-15 with 144 yards.

Rivers completed 29 of his 37 passes and had a 130.0 passer rating, his highest ever in a game in which he threw over 31 passes. Keenan Allen established career-highs of 10 catches for 135 yards, and Royal had five receptions for 105 yards, his first 100-yard game with the Chargers. Novak made four field goals. Earlier in the week on Tuesday, the Chargers had made 10 player transactions largely due to injuries. Playing without Mathews and Woodhead, San Diego ran for just 42 yards on 20 carries; the team entered the game averaging a league-low 2.4 yards per carry. "We've got to work on the running game. We'll get better," Chargers head coach Mike McCoy said.

==== Week 5: vs. New York Jets ====
Week Five: New York Jets at San Diego Chargers – Game summary

Quarter	1	2	3	4	Total
Jets	0	0	0	0	**0**
**Chargers**	7	14	7	3	**31**

at Qualcomm Stadium, San Diego, California

- Date: October 5
- Game time: 1:25 pm. PDT
- Game weather: 91 °F (33 °C), sunny
- Game attendance: 63,471
- Referee: Ron Torbert
- TV announcers (CBS): Greg Gumbel, Trent Green and Evan Washburn
- Recap, Gamebook

Game information

**First quarter**

- SDG – Antonio Gates 8-yard pass from Philip Rivers (Nick Novak kick), 7:31. Chargers 7–0. **Drive: 11 plays, 90 yards, 5:38.**

**Second quarter**

- SDG – Antonio Gates 12-yard pass from Philip Rivers (Nick Novak kick), 10:15. Chargers 14–0. **Drive: 3 plays, 20 yards, 1:42.**
- SDG – Branden Oliver 15-yard run (Nick Novak kick), 0:42. Chargers 21–0. **Drive: 12 plays, 91 yards, 6:46.**

**Third quarter**

- SDG – Branden Oliver 9-yard pass from Philip Rivers (Nick Novak kick), 6:44. Chargers 28–0. **Drive: 9 plays, 90 yards, 5:05.**

**Fourth quarter**

- SDG – Nick Novak 34-yard field goal, 13:28. Chargers 31–0. **Drive: 7 plays, 22 yards, 3:49.**

**Top passers**

- NYJ – Michael Vick – 8/19, 47 yards
- SDG – Philip Rivers – 20/28, 288 yards, 3 TD, INT

**Top rushers**

- NYJ – Chris Ivory – 9 rushes, 44 yards
- SDG – Branden Oliver – 19 rushes, 114 yards, TD

**Top receivers**

- NYJ – Jeremy Kerley – 3 receptions, 24 yards
- SDG – Malcom Floyd – 3 receptions, 72 yards

Mike McCoy's desire to improve the run game came to fruition against the New York Jets. The Chargers ran for 162 yards against the Jets, who came into the game ranked number one in the NFL in rush defense. Donald Brown was knocked out of the game with a concussion in the first half and Branden Oliver, their fourth-string running back, played. Oliver ran 19 times for 114 yards and a touchdown. He also caught 4 passes for 68 yards and a touchdown. These were the first two NFL touchdowns for the rookie.

Philip Rivers completed 20 throws on 28 attempts for 288 yards, three touchdowns and one interception. Two of his touchdown throws were to Antonio Gates. With 65 touchdowns, Rivers and Gates set the NFL record for most between a quarterback and tight end duo. It was Gates' 91 and 92 career TD catches, moving him into 10th place all-time. After the game, Rivers stressed this year's toughness of the team as its success.

The offense of the Jets on the other hand, crossed the 50-yard line for the first time with 7:35 left in the fourth quarter. Geno Smith threw only four completions on 12 attempts for 27 yards and an interception. In the first offensive possession for the Jets in the second half, he was benched for Michael Vick. Vick did only a little better by throwing 8 completions on 19 attempts for 27 yards and ran twice for 14 yards.

The Chargers were the first team to win by a shutout in the 2014 season (week five). The Chargers' last shutout victory was 31–0 against Kansas City on December 12, 2010. The Jets were shut out for the first time since losing 34–0 against San Francisco on September 30, 2012. With the day's loss, the Jets had lost four straight games.

==== Week 6: at Oakland Raiders ====
Week Six: San Diego Chargers at Oakland Raiders – Game summary

Quarter	1	2	3	4	Total
**Chargers**	7	7	7	10	**31**
Raiders	7	7	7	7	**28**

at O.co Coliseum, Oakland, California

- Date: October 12
- Game time: 1:05 pm. PDT
- Game weather: 77 °F (25 °C), sunny
- Game attendance: 53,329
- Referee: Tony Corrente
- TV announcers (CBS): Kevin Harlan, Rich Gannon and Scott Kaplan
- Recap, Gamebook

Game information

**First quarter**

- OAK – Andre Holmes 77-yard pass from Derek Carr (Sebastian Janikowski kick), 14:08. Raiders 7–0. **Drive: 3 plays, 80 yards, 0:52.**
- SDG – Eddie Royal 29-yard pass from Philip Rivers (Nick Novak kick), 9:38. Tied 7–7. **Drive: 7 plays, 80 yard, 4:30.**

**Second quarter**

- SDG – Malcom Floyd 5-yard pass from Philip Rivers (Nick Novak kick), 11:52. Chargers 14–7. **Drive: 13 plays, 85 yard, 7:20.**
- OAK – James Jones 6-yard pass from Derek Carr (Sebastian Janikowski kick), 7:25. Tied 14–14. **Drive: 11 plays, 76 yards, 4:27.**

**Third quarter**

- OAK – Brice Butler 47-yard pass from Derek Carr (Sebastian Janikowski kick), 7:40. Raiders 21–14. **Drive: 3 plays, 54 yards, 0:55.**
- SDG – Antonio Gates 1-yard pass from Philip Rivers (Nick Novak kick), 2:52. Tied 21–21. **Drive: 8 plays, 80 yards, 4:48.**

**Fourth quarter**

- OAK – Andre Holmes 6-yard pass from Derek Carr (Sebastian Janikowski kick), 10:01. Raiders 28–21. **Drive: 7 plays, 50 yards, 4:40.**
- SDG – Nick Novak 30-yard field goal, 5:52. Raiders 28–24. **Drive: 9 plays, 68 yards, 4:09.**
- SDG – Branden Oliver 1-yard run (Nick Novak kick), 1:56. Chargers 31–28. **Drive: 6 plays, 39 yards, 2:47.**

**Top passers**

- SDG – Philip Rivers – 22/34, 313 yards, 3 TD
- OAK – Derek Carr – 18/34, 282 yards, 4 TD, INT

**Top rushers**

- SDG – Branden Oliver – 26 rushes, 101 yards, TD
- OAK – Darren McFadden – 14 rushes, 80 yards

**Top receivers**

- SDG – Malcom Floyd – 5 receptions, 103 yards, TD
- OAK – Andre Holmes – 4 receptions, 121 yards, 2 TD

Rookie cornerback Jason Verrett intercepted Oakland Raiders rookie quarterback Derek Carr at the San Diego 5 with 1:13 remaining in the game to seal a 31–28 Chargers win on the road. San Diego had gone ahead with 1:56 to play on a 1-yard touchdown run by Oliver. Verrett's first career interception helped the Chargers extend their winning streak to five, while Oakland suffered its 11th straight defeat. The Chargers 5–1 start to begin the season was their best since 2002.

Carr threw a 77-yard TD pass to Andre Holmes in the opening minute of the game, and he and Rivers both threw two touchdowns in the first half for a 14–14 tie at halftime. In the third quarter, a 54-yard Novak field goal was nullified by a Chargers holding penalty. On fourth-and-35, Weddle threw an incomplete pass on a fake punt, giving the Raiders excellent field position; Oakland then scored on a 47-yard TD pass from Carr to Brice Butler. The Chargers responded with a Gates score on a 1-yard pass from Rivers, and the game was tied at 21 to begin the fourth quarter.

Oakland took the lead again after Carr found Holmes for a 6-yard TD with 10 minutes left. On the following possession, Rivers completed the first four passes for 70 yards, which led to a 30-yard field goal by Novak. The Chargers defense forced a three-and-out, when Allen—filling in for an injured Royal—returned the punt 29 yards to the Oakland 39. With 4:49 remaining, Rivers led the six-play game-winning TD drive which culminated with four straight runs by Oliver for 29 yards. The Raiders had the ball on the Chargers 45 on second-and-one, when Carr threw deep for Butler, but Verrett leaped for an acrobatic sideline interception. Verrett had left the game earlier in the third quarter after tearing his left labrum in three places while diving for a pass.

Oliver ran for 101 yards in the game, and Rivers threw for 313 yards and three touchdowns. For Rivers, it was an NFL-record fifth straight game with at least a 120 passer rating. Verrett grew up a Raiders fan in nearby Fairfield, California. About 100 of his friends and family attended the game, including his brother, who works for the Raiders.

==== Week 7: vs. Kansas City Chiefs ====
Week Seven: Kansas City Chiefs at San Diego Chargers – Game summary

Quarter	1	2	3	4	Total
**Chiefs**	0	10	3	10	**23**
Chargers	7	7	0	6	**20**

at Qualcomm Stadium, San Diego, California

- Date: October 19
- Game time: 1:05 pm. PDT
- Game weather: 75 °F (24 °C), sunny
- Game attendance: 65,260
- Referee: Bill Vinovich
- TV announcers (CBS): Spero Dedes and Solomon Wilcots
- Recap, Gamebook

Game information

**First quarter**

- SDG – John Phillips 1-yard pass from Philip Rivers (Nick Novak kick), 3:19. Chargers 7–0. **Drive: 5 plays, 61 yards, 2:41.**

**Second quarter**

- KC – Jamaal Charles 16-yard run (Cairo Santos kick), 15:00. Tied 7–7. **Drive: 6 plays, 66 yards, 3:24.**
- KC – Cairo Santos 28-yard field goal, 3:19. Chiefs 10–7. **Drive: 14 plays, 56 yards, 9:31.**
- SDG – Antonio Gates 27-yard pass from Philip Rivers (Nick Novak kick), 0:19. Chargers 14–10. **Drive: 6 plays, 80 yards, 0:41.**

**Third quarter**

- KC – Cairo Santos 40-yard field goal, 8:40. Chargers 14–13. **Drive: 12 plays, 63 yards, 6:25.**

**Fourth quarter**

- KC – Anthony Sherman 11-yard pass from Alex Smith (Cairo Santos kick), 15:00. Chiefs 20–14. **Drive: 11 plays, 70 yards, 7:43.**
- SDG – Nick Novak 24-yard field goal, 9:40. Chiefs 20–17. **Drive: 12 plays, 77 yards, 5:14.**
- SDG – Nick Novak 48-yard field goal, 2:04. Tied 20–20. **Drive: 9 plays, 58 yards, 3:42.**
- KC – Cairo Santos 48-yard field goal, 0:26. Chiefs 23–20. **Drive: 9 plays, 62 yards, 1:36.**

**Top passers**

- KC – Alex Smith – 19/28, 221 yards, TD
- SDG – Philip Rivers – 17/31, 205 yards, 2 TD, INT

**Top rushers**

- KC – Jamaal Charles – 22 rushes, 95 yards, TD
- SDG – Branden Oliver – 15 rushes, 67 yards

**Top receivers**

- KC – Dwayne Bowe – 5 receptions, 84 yards
- SDG – Antonio Gates – 3 receptions, 61 yards, TD

A late field goal of 48 yards by rookie Cairo Santos gave the Kansas City Chiefs a 23–20 win over the Chargers. The Chiefs ran 70 plays to the Chargers' 49, and controlled the ball for 39 minutes during the game to San Diego's 21. San Diego was just 3-for-10 on third down conversions after entering the game with a 53.8% success rate, the highest in the league. The loss ended the team's six-game home winning streak over the Chiefs.

The Chargers got out to a 7–0 lead after tight end John Phillips' first catch of the season, a 1-yard TD from Rivers. They regained the lead, 14–10, after Gates' 27-yard TD off a tipped pass 14 seconds before halftime. San Diego was limited to just one offensive drive in the third quarter, a three-and-out series that lasted just 1:02, and Kansas City led 20–14 after an Alex Smith 11-yard TD pass to Anthony Sherman with 14:50 left in the fourth. The Chargers responded with a 12-play drive, driving all the way to the Chiefs 6, but settled for a Novak 24-yard field goal. After a defensive stop, Novak kicked a 48-yarder to tied the game at 20 with 1:57 remaining. It was his 31st straight field goal, breaking Carney's team record of 29 set from 1992 to 1993. However, the Chiefs drove 62 yards on nine plays on their game-winning drive.

Rivers was 17 of 31 for 205 yards and two touchdowns with an 83.4 rating, breaking his streak of games with 120 or higher. The Chargers' offense had season lows of 205 passing yards and 251 total yards. Smith, the first established quarterback the Chargers had faced in four games, was 19 of 28 passes for 221 yards. Chiefs coach Andy Reid, in his second year with the team, improved his career record to 14–2 coming off a bye week. Retired defensive end Leslie O'Neal was inducted into the Chargers Hall of Fame at halftime. This was the first of two games in which the Chargers wore their alternate powder blue jerseys – the other was against the New England Patriots on December 7.

==== Week 8: at Denver Broncos ====
Week Eight: San Diego Chargers at Denver Broncos – Game summary

Quarter	1	2	3	4	Total
Chargers	0	7	7	7	**21**
**Broncos**	0	14	14	7	**35**

at Sports Authority Field at Mile High, Denver, Colorado

- Date: October 23
- Game time: 6:25 p.m. MDT/5:25 pm. PDT
- Game weather: 68 °F (20 °C), partly cloudy
- Game attendance: 76,907
- Referee: Terry McAulay
- TV announcers (CBS/NFLN): Jim Nantz, Phil Simms and Tracy Wolfson
- Recap, Gamebook

Game information

**First quarter**

- No scoring plays.

**Second quarter**

- DEN – Emmanuel Sanders 2-yard pass from Peyton Manning (Brandon McManus kick), 13:35. Broncos 7–0. **Drive: 7 plays, 69 yards, 3:18.**
- SDG – Keenan Allen 2-yard pass from Philip Rivers (Nick Novak kick), 3:07. Tied 7–7. **Drive: 13 plays, 84 yards, 7:31.**
- DEN – Emmanuel Sanders 31-yard TD pass from Peyton Manning (Brandon McManus kick), 0:32. Broncos 14–7. **Drive: 8 plays, 74 yards, 2:35.**

**Third quarter**

- DEN – Emmanuel Sanders 3-yard TD pass from Peyton Manning (Brandon McManus kick), 10:53. Broncos 21–7. **Drive: 6 plays, 51 yards, 2:42.**
- DEN – Juwan Thompson 2-yard TD run (Brandon McManus kick), 7:34. Broncos 28–7. **Drive: 5 plays, 61 yards, 1:41.**
- SDG – Antonio Gates 4-yard TD pass from Philip Rivers (Nick Novak kick), 2:39. Broncos 28–14. **Drive: 12 plays, 80 yards, 4:55.**

**Fourth quarter**

- DEN – Juwan Thompson 1-yard TD run (Brandon McManus kick), 13:29. Broncos 35–14. **Drive: 8 plays, 65 yards, 4:10.**
- SDG – Antonio Gates 10-yard TD pass from Philip Rivers (Nick Novak kick), 9:31. Broncos 35–14. **Drive: 8 plays, 80 yards, 3:58.**

**Top passers**

- SDG – Philip Rivers – 30/41, 252 yards, 3 TD, 2 INT
- DEN – Peyton Manning – 25/35, 286 yards, 3 TD

**Top rushers**

- SDG – Branden Oliver – 13 rushes, 36 yards
- DEN – Ronnie Hillman – 20 rushes, 109 yards

**Top receivers**

- SDG – Keenan Allen – 9 receptions, 73 yards, TD
- DEN – Emmanuel Sanders – 9 receptions, 120 yards, 3 TD

Peyton Manning connected with Emmanuel Sanders for three touchdowns to lead the Denver Broncos to a 35–21 win over San Diego. Rookie Juwan Thompson also ran for two TDs to help the Broncos (6–1) expand their lead over the Chargers (5–3) in the AFC West. A year earlier, San Diego had handed Denver their only home loss of the season.

The game was tied 7–7 in the second quarter after Rivers capped a 13-play, 84-yard drive with a 2-yard TD to Allen. On the following kickoff, the Chargers appeared to recover a fumble by Denver, but the play was overturned. Manning then drove his team eight plays for a 31-yard TD to Sanders past cornerback Richard Marshall. The Chargers were trailing 28–14 in the fourth quarter with the Broncos on the San Diego 2, when Weddle intercepted Manning; however, the play was nullified by a holding penalty against Gilchrist, and Thompson scored on a 1-yard run the next play. The Chargers followed with an eight-play, 80-yard TD drive in less than two minutes, with Gates scoring for the second time for a 35–21 game with 9 1/2 minutes left. Weddle forced a Denver fumble on the first play of the following drive, but San Diego was unable to recover the ball. Denver kicker Brandon McManus missed a 53-yard attempt with six minutes remaining, and the Chargers received the ball with excellent field position. San Diego's drive ended with a Rahim Moore interception of a Rivers pass intended for Floyd at the Denver 4.

Rivers ended the game 30 of 41 for 252 yards with three TDs and two interceptions. Gates become the team leader in career yards receiving after passing Pro Football Hall of Fame receiver Lance Alworth (9,584). Manning finished 25 of 35 for 286 yards with three TDs and no interceptions. The Chargers were playing without injured cornerbacks Flowers (concussion) and Steve Williams (groin); Verrett played despite a hurt shoulder injured during the Raiders game, but was unable to play after a few series in the second quarter.

==== Week 9: at Miami Dolphins ====
Week Nine: San Diego Chargers at Miami Dolphins – Game summary

Quarter	1	2	3	4	Total
Chargers	0	0	0	0	**0**
**Dolphins**	7	13	17	0	**37**

at Sun Life Stadium, Miami Gardens, Florida

- Date: November 2
- Game time: 1:00 pm. EST/10:00 am. PST
- Game weather: 70 °F (21 °C), sunny
- Game attendance: 70,222
- Referee: Brad Allen
- TV announcers (CBS): Ian Eagle, Dan Fouts and Jenny Dell
- Recap, Gamebook

Game information

**First quarter**

- MIA – Charles Clay 6-yard pass from Ryan Tannehill (Caleb Sturgis kick), 1:40. Dolphins 7–0. **Drive: 10 plays, 77 yards, 5:56.**

**Second quarter**

- MIA – Lamar Miller 2-yard run (Caleb Sturgis kick), 11:08. Dolphins 14–0. **Drive: 8 plays, 61 yards, 3:42.**
- MIA – Caleb Sturgis 26-yard field goal, 8:53. Dolphins 17–0. **Drive: 5 plays, 23 yards, 1:58.**
- MIA – Caleb Sturgis 25-yard field goal, 1:52. Dolphins 20–0. **Drive: 11 plays, 63 yards, 5:31.**

**Third quarter**

- MIA – Rishard Matthews 21-yard pass from Ryan Tannehill (Caleb Sturgis kick), 11:02. Dolphins 27–0. **Drive: 8 plays, 72 yards, 3:58.**
- MIA – Caleb Sturgis 23-yard field goal, 7:04. Dolphins 30–0. **Drive: 6 plays, 14 yards, 2:01.**
- MIA – Jarvis Landry 14-yard pass from Ryan Tannehill (Caleb Sturgis kick), 2:00. Dolphins 37–0. **Drive: 1 play, 14 yards, 0:05.**

**Fourth quarter**

- No scoring plays.

**Top passers**

- SDG – Philip Rivers – 12/23, 138 yards, 3 INT
- MIA – Ryan Tannehill – 24/34, 288 yards, 3 TD

**Top rushers**

- SDG – Donald Brown – 4 rushes, 23 yards
- MIA – Lamar Miller – 11 rushes, 49 yards, TD

**Top receivers**

- SDG – Malcom Floyd – 4 receptions, 60 yards
- MIA – Charles Clay – 5 receptions, 65 yards, TD

The Chargers committed four turnovers and lost 37–0 to the Miami Dolphins for their most lopsided defeat since 1996. The Dolphins front four dominated the Chargers' offensive line, forcing three interceptions and a lost fumble by Rivers. It was San Diego's third straight loss, and the first time they had been shut out since 1999.

On the opening possession of the game, San Diego gambled on fourth and 1 from the Miami 22, but Oliver was stopped for a 1-yard loss. It was the only time the Chargers crossed midfield during the game. Miami led 17–0 after the first 21 minutes. They scored on all but one of their seven possessions in the first half, the exception being Caleb Sturgis' miss on a 45-yard field goal attempt to end the half. Rivers was limited to 138 yards passing in the game, and was twice intercepted by Brent Grimes. His quarterback rating of 31.0 was his lowest since 2007.

San Diego remained winless in South Florida since the Epic in Miami in January 1982, a string of eight straight losses to the Dolphins. Running back Donald Brown returned from his concussion in Week 5, and ran four times for 23 yards.

==== Week 11: vs. Oakland Raiders ====
Week Eleven: Oakland Raiders at San Diego Chargers – Game summary

Quarter	1	2	3	4	Total
Raiders	3	0	0	3	**6**
**Chargers**	7	3	3	0	**13**

at Qualcomm Stadium, San Diego, California

- Date: November 16
- Game time: 1:05 pm. PST
- Game weather: 72 °F (22 °C), sunny
- Game attendance: 66,720
- Referee: Jeff Triplette
- TV announcers (CBS): Spero Dedes, Solomon Wilcots and Scott Kaplan
- Recap, Gamebook

Game information

**First quarter**

- SDG – Malcom Floyd 22-yard pass from Philip Rivers (Nick Novak kick), 14:07. Chargers 7–0. **Drive: 2 plays, 22 yards, 0:46.**
- OAK – Sebastian Janikowski 42-yard field goal, 7:27. Chargers 7–3. **Drive: 8 plays, 47 yards, 3:28.**

**Second quarter**

- SDG – Nick Novak 23-yard field goal, 4:12. Chargers 10–3. **Drive: 11 plays, 52 yards, 5:27.**

**Third quarter**

- SDG – Nick Novak 23-yard field goal, 7:19. Chargers 13–3. **Drive: 7 plays, 33 yards, 4:01.**

**Fourth quarter**

- OAK – Sebastian Janikowski 25-yard field goal, 4:06. Chargers 13–6. **Drive: 7 plays, 48 yards, 2:09.**

**Top passers**

- OAK – Derek Carr – 16/34, 172 yards
- SDG – Philip Rivers – 22/34, 193 yards, TD

**Top rushers**

- OAK – Latavius Murray – 4 rushes, 43 yards
- SDG – Ryan Mathews – 16 rushes, 70 yards

**Top receivers**

- OAK – Kenbrell Thompkins – 2 receptions, 47 yards
- SDG – Keenan Allen – 8 receptions, 63 yards

Floyd caught a 22-yard touchdown from Rivers on the game's third play from scrimmage, and San Diego held on for a lackluster 13–6 win over Oakland. Both teams punted nine times, with Chargers punter Mike Scifres pinning the Raiders inside the 20 on five of his kicks. U-T San Diego lauded Scifres' performance, stating that he "arguably was the team MVP." San Diego was a season low 27% (4-for-15) on third-down conversions, after entering the game fourth best in the league (48%). Gates made a difficult catch late in the fourth quarter to extend a drive and help seal the game.

San Diego linebacker Donald Butler recovered a fumble on the opening play of the game after Carr mishandled the snap from the shotgun formation. Two plays later, River lobbed a pass to Floyd, who leaped over T. J. Carrie for the score. The Chargers went up 10–3 after Novak kicked a 23-yard field goal to extend his team record to 32 consecutive field goals; however, he was wide left on a 48-yard attempt as the half ended. Rivers was injured after completing a 28-yard pass to Floyd in the third quarter, but the play was called back on a holding call against tackle King Dunlap. The Chargers settled on a 52-yard field goal by Novak for a 13–3 lead. The Raiders knocked the wind out of Rivers in the fourth, but he remained in the game after Oakland pulled with a touchdown with a 25-yard field goal from Sebastian Janikowski with four minutes remaining. On the following drive, Gates converted a key third-and-3 with a 15-yard catch at the Oakland 45 after tipping the pass to himself between safeties Charles Woodson and Brandian Ross. An incompletion would have forced a punt with 2:32 left; instead, Oakland need to use their remaining timeouts before receiving the ball back with 65 seconds to go. Carr threw a desperation pass that was incomplete short of the end zone as the game clock expired.

Scifres' nine punts, which were the second most of his career, included ones that pinned the Raiders at their 2-, 4-, 6- and 8-, and 12-yard line. Oakland crossed midfield just twice in the game. San Diego started four drives on their 41-yard line or better, which netted only three punts and a field goal. Rivers was 22 of 34 for 193 yards. After saying that Rivers had been suffering a "very severe rib injury" for weeks, Gates later said he was "taken out of context". According to McCoy, Rivers had not missed any practice time nor received any treatment from the team trainer. After being out since September, Ryan Mathews, Manti Te'o and Melvin Ingram played for the Chargers. After missing seven games, Mathews ran 16 times for 70 yards, bolstering a running game that was averaging a league-low 3.1 yards per carry.

==== Week 12: vs. St. Louis Rams ====
Week Twelve: St. Louis Rams at San Diego Chargers – Game summary

Quarter	1	2	3	4	Total
Rams	3	7	7	7	**24**
**Chargers**	3	3	14	7	**27**

at Qualcomm Stadium, San Diego, California

- Date: November 23
- Game time: 1:05 pm. PST
- Game weather: 72 °F (22 °C), sunny
- Game attendance: 66,040
- Referee: Carl Cheffers
- TV announcers (Fox): Chris Myers, Ronde Barber and Jennifer Hale
- Recap, Gamebook

Game information

**First quarter**

- SDG – Nick Novak 23-yard field goal, 9:10. Chargers 3–0. **Drive: 6 plays, 18 yards, 2:30.**
- STL – Greg Zuerlein 22-yard field goal, 1:03. Tied 3–3. **Drive: 13 plays, 64 yards, 8:07.**

**Second quarter**

- STL – Janoris Jenkins 99-yard interception return (Greg Zuerlein kick), 11:32. Rams 10–3.
- SDG – Nick Novak 48-yard field goal, 0:02. Rams 10–6. **Drive: 10 plays, 54 yards, 1:31.**

**Third quarter**

- SDG – Ryan Mathews 32-yard run (Nick Novak kick), 9:50. Chargers 13–10. **Drive: 5 plays, 61 yards, 2:49.**
- SDG – Andrew Gachkar 13-yard defensive fumble return (Nick Novak kick), 9:29. Chargers 20–10.
- STL – Tavon Austin 6 yard run (Greg Zuerlein kick), 6:18. Chargers 20–17. **Drive: 3 plays, 21 yards, 0:53.**

**Fourth quarter**

- SDG – Keenan Allen 29-yard pass from Philip Rivers (Nick Novak kick), 8:09. Chargers 27–17. **Drive: 11 plays, 93 yards, 7:16.**
- STL – Stedman Bailey 7-yard pass from Shaun Hill (Greg Zuerlein kick), 2:04. Chargers 27–24. **Drive: 13 plays, 80 yards, 6:05.**

**Top passers**

- STL – Shaun Hill – 18/35, 198 yards, TD, 2 INT
- SDG – Philip Rivers – 29/35, 291 yards, TD, INT

**Top rushers**

- STL – Tre Mason – 16 rushes, 62 yards
- SDG – Ryan Mathews – 12 rushes, 105 yards, TD

**Top receivers**

- STL – Stedman Bailey – 7 receptions, 89 yards, TD
- SDG – Keenan Allen – 6 receptions, 104 yards, TD

Gilchrist intercepted St. Louis Rams quarterback Shaun Hill's pass at the Chargers' goal line with a minute left in the game to secure a 27–24 win for San Diego.

==== Week 13: at Baltimore Ravens ====
Week Thirteen: San Diego Chargers at Baltimore Ravens – Game summary

Quarter	1	2	3	4	Total
**Chargers**	7	3	3	21	**34**
Ravens	10	6	7	10	**33**

at M&T Bank Stadium, Baltimore, Maryland

- Date: November 30
- Game time: 1:00 pm. EST/10:00 am. PST
- Game weather: 54 °F (12 °C), partly cloudy
- Game attendance: 71,060
- Referee: Walt Anderson
- TV announcers (CBS): Ian Eagle, Dan Fouts and Jenny Dell
- Recap, Gamebook

Game information

**First quarter**

- BAL – Torrey Smith 16-yard pass from Joe Flacco (Justin Tucker kick), 10:46. Ravens 7–0. **Drive: 8 plays, 61 yards, 4:14.**
- BAL – Justin Tucker 33-yard field goal, 7:48. Ravens 10–0. **Drive: 4 plays, 4 yards, 2:11.**
- SDG – Keenan Allen 12-yard pass from Philip Rivers (Nick Novak kick), 0:20. Ravens 10–7. **Drive: 13 plays, 80 yards, 7:28.**

**Second quarter**

- BAL – Justin Tucker 21-yard field goal, 11:09. Ravens 13–7. **Drive: 11 plays, 66 yards, 4:11.**
- BAL – Justin Tucker 29-yard field goal, 1:41. Ravens 16–7. **Drive: 9 plays, 73 yards, 4:01.**
- SDG – Nick Novak 52-yard field goal, 0:02. Ravens 16–10. **Drive: 10 plays, 46 yards, 1:39.**

**Third quarter**

- SDG – Nick Novak 26-yard field goal, 10:10. Ravens 16–13. **Drive: 9 plays, 72 yards, 4:50.**
- BAL – Torrey Smith 10-yard pass from Joe Flacco (Justin Tucker kick), 5:01. Ravens 23–13. **Drive: 10 plays, 53 yards, 5:09.**

**Fourth quarter**

- SDG – Ryan Mathews 14-yard run (Nick Novak kick), 13:12. Ravens 23–20. **Drive: 5 plays, 59 yards, 2:05.**
- BAL – Joe Flacco 1-yard run (Justin Tucker kick), 6:13. Ravens 30–20. **Drive: 12 plays, 79 yards, 6:59.**
- SDG – Keenan Allen 23-yard pass from Philip Rivers (Nick Novak kick), 3:40. Ravens 30–27. **Drive: 6 plays, 77 yards, 2:33.**
- BAL – Justin Tucker 31-yard field goal, 2:22. Ravens 33–27. **Drive: 6 plays, 17 yards, 1:18.**
- SDG – Eddie Royal 1-yard pass from Philip Rivers (Nick Novak kick), 0:38. Chargers 34–33. **Drive: 8 plays, 80 yards, 1:44.**

**Top passers**

- SDG – Philip Rivers – 34/45, 383 yards, 3 TD, INT
- BAL – Joe Flacco – 19/31, 225 yards, 2 TD

**Top rushers**

- SDG – Ryan Mathews – 12 rushes, 40 yards, TD
- BAL – Justin Forsett – 24 rushes, 106 yards

**Top receivers**

- SDG – Keenan Allen – 11 receptions, 121 yards, 2 TD
- BAL – Torrey Smith – 6 receptions, 65 yards, 2 TD

Rivers passed to Royal for the go-ahead touchdown with 38 seconds left in the game to defeat the Baltimore Ravens on the road, 34–33, for their third straight win. The Chargers had trailed the entire game, including 30–20 with 6:13 left and 33–27 with 2:22 to go. Rivers completed 34 of 45 passes for 383 yards and three touchdowns, including two scores to Allen.

Rivers was intercepted on the Chargers' first drive of the game, and Baltimore led 10–0 almost eight minutes into the contest. On their next possession, San Diego went 80 yards on 13 plays for their first TD, a 12-yard pass from Rivers to Allen. The Chargers pulled to 16–13 early in the third quarter after a 59-yard pass by Rivers to Floyd set up a 26-yard Novak field goal. On the following drive, a roughing the passer penalty by Weddle led to a TD pass by the Ravens' Joe Flacco for a 23–20 lead. Flacco later scored on a quarterback sneak after a pass interference penalty on Shareece Wright. The Chargers responded with a 77-yard drive, culminating in a 23-yard TD from Rivers to Allen with 3:40 remaining. Jacoby Jones returned the ensuing kickoff 72 yards to the San Diego 30, setting up Justin Tucker's fourth field goal of the game for the Ravens. Rivers then led the 80-yard game-winning drive. After an interference call against Anthony Levine in the end zone, Rivers connected with Royal for a TD.

Rivers moved to 20th among NFL leaders in career passing yards, passing Carson Palmer (35,365) and Jim Kelly (35,467). The Chargers had four players—Gates, Allen, Royal, and Floyd—with over 80 yards receiving in the game for the first time in team history. Each team punted only once in the game. It was the Ravens first loss in November since 2009. They had also been 11–0 at home against West Coast teams. The Chargers used their fifth different center of the season, Trevor Robinson, after their fourth center, Chris Watt, left the game with an injury.

==== Week 14: vs. New England Patriots ====
Week Fourteen: New England Patriots at San Diego Chargers – Game summary

Quarter	1	2	3	4	Total
**Patriots**	3	10	0	10	**23**
Chargers	0	14	0	0	**14**

at Qualcomm Stadium, San Diego, California

- Date: December 7
- Game time: 5:30 pm. PST
- Game weather: 67 °F (19 °C), partly cloudy
- Game attendance: 68,815
- Referee: Bill Leavy
- TV announcers (NBC): Al Michaels, Cris Collinsworth and Michele Tafoya
- Recap, Gamebook

Game information

**First quarter**

- Stephen Gostkowski 22-yard field goal, 3:15. Patriots 3–0. **Drive: 17 plays, 89 yards, 7:56.**

**Second quarter**

- Malcom Floyd 15-yard pass from Philip Rivers (Nick Novak kick), 13:29. Chargers 7–3. **Drive: 11 plays, 80 yards, 4:46.**
- Darrell Stuckey 53-yard fumble return (Novak kick), 11:06. Chargers 14–3.
- Stephen Gostkowksi 22-yard field goal, 7:28. Chargers 14–6. **Drive: 12 plays, 70 yards, 3:28.**
- Rob Gronkowski 14-yard pass from Tom Brady (Gostkowski kick), 3:28. Chargers 14–13. **Drive: 4 plays, 25 yards, 2:03.**

**Third quarter**

- No scoring plays

**Fourth quarter**

- Stephen Gostkowski 38-yard field goal, 10:34. Patriots 16–14. **Drive: 10 plays, 55 yards, 5:04.**
- Julian Edelman 69-yard pass from Tom Brady (Gostkowski kick), 8:41. Patriots 23–14. **Drive: 1 play, 69 yards, 0:12.**

**Top passers**

- NE – Tom Brady – 28/44, 317 yards, 2 TD, INT
- SDG – Philip Rivers – 20/33, 189 yards, TD, INT

**Top rushers**

- NE – LeGarrette Blount – 20 rushes, 66 yards
- SDG – Ryan Mathews – 11 rushes, 44 yards

**Top receivers**

- NE – Julian Edelman – 8 receptions, 141 yards, TD
- SDG – Donald Brown – 5 receptions, 49 yards

The Chargers contained the New England Patriots offense for a 1-point lead through three-quarters before losing 23–14. After being held without a first down in the third quarter, the Patriots went ahead with a field goal in the fourth quarter, and capped the scoring with Tom Brady connecting with Julian Edelman for a 69-yard TD. San Diego was shut out in the second half. The win gave New England their 12th straight 10-win season, the second-longest such streak in NFL history.

The Chargers led 14–3 after scoring twice within 2 minutes, 33 seconds in the second quarter. Floyd made a diving catch for a 15-yard TD, and safety Darrell Stuckey returned a fumble for a 53-yard score. After Patriots kicker Stephen Gostkowski's second field goal, Brandon Bolden blocked a punt by Scifres, and New England recovered the ball at the San Diego 28. Scifres was carted off the field after injuring his left shoulder on the play. Four plays later, Brady hit Rob Gronkowski on a 14-yard TD pass to trail 14–13. Before halftime, Te'o leaped for his first career interception on a pass intended for Gronkowski, preserving the Chargers' lead. In the third quarter, Devin McCourty returned a Rivers interception for a touchdown, but the play was wiped out by a personal foul on Brandon Browner for San Diego's Ladarius Green in the head. The Chargers' offense crossed midfield just once in the second half, getting as far as the Patriots 42. Their defense held New England to just 35 yards in the third quarter, forcing a three-and-out on four consecutive drives, before Brady engineered the 32nd fourth-quarter comeback of his career.

Rivers completed 20 of his 33 passes for 189 yards. He fell to 0–6 against Brady, who was 28-of-44 for 317 yards and two touchdowns with one interception. The Patriots entered the game scoring an average of 31.5 points, the third highest in the league. Novak took over as punter after Scifres' injury; he filled in after starting with a couple of short kicks. Scifres required season-ending surgery for a broken collarbone. Mathews entered the locker room early before halftime after limping following a tripping penalty by New England. After rushing nine times for 52 yards in the first half, he had just two carries for minus 8 yards the rest of the game. The ankle sprain sidelined Mathews for the remainder of the season.

==== Week 15: vs. Denver Broncos ====
Week Fifteen: Denver Broncos at San Diego Chargers – Game summary

Quarter	1	2	3	4	Total
**Broncos**	3	6	7	6	**22**
Chargers	0	3	0	7	**10**

at Qualcomm Stadium, San Diego, California

- Date: December 14
- Game time: 1:05 pm. PST
- Game weather: 64 °F (18 °C), sunny
- Game attendance: 68,682
- Referee: Craig Wrolstad
- TV announcers (CBS): Jim Nantz, Phil Simms and Tracy Wolfson
- Recap, Gamebook

Game information

**First quarter**

- DEN – Connor Barth 19-yard field goal, 6:55. Broncos 3–0. **Drive: 9 plays, 68 yards, 3:51.**

**Second quarter**

- DEN – Connor Barth 26-yard field goal, 14:21. Broncos 6–0. **Drive: 12 plays, 61 yards, 6:06.**
- DEN – Connor Barth 19-yard field goal, 1:50. Broncos 9–0. **Drive: 11 plays, 63 yards, 5:08.**
- SDG – Nick Novak 30-yard field goal, 0:10. Broncos 9–3. **Drive: 4 plays, 5 yards, 0:40.**

**Third quarter**

- DEN – Demaryius Thomas 28-yard pass from Peyton Manning (Connor Barth kick), 0:31. Broncos 16–3. **Drive: 7 plays, 73 yards, 4:01.**

**Fourth quarter**

- SDG – Antonio Gates 5-yard pass from Philip Rivers (Nick Novak kick), 10:13. Broncos 16–10. **Drive: 11 plays, 80 yards, 5:18.**
- DEN – Connor Barth 49-yard field goal, 4:53. Broncos 19–10. **Drive: 10 plays, 57 yards, 5:20.**
- DEN – Connor Barth 44-yard field goal, 3:56. Broncos 22–10. **Drive: 4 plays, 8 yards, 0:20.**

**Top passers**

- DEN – Peyton Manning – 14/20, 233 yards, TD
- SDG – Philip Rivers – 24/41, 232 yards, TD, 2 INT

**Top rushers**

- DEN – C. J. Anderson – 29 rushes, 85 yards
- SDG – Branden Oliver – 12 rushes, 26 yards

**Top receivers**

- DEN – Demaryius Thomas – 6 receptions, 123 yards, TD
- SDG – Antonio Gates – 6 receptions, 54 yards, TD

San Diego lost 22–10 to the Broncos after struggling offensively for the second consecutive week. After entering the game with the 6th best record in the AFC, the loss was a blow to the Chargers' (8–6) playoff chances. It was their second consecutive home loss to the two teams tied for the best record in their conference. Denver's Manning threw a scoring pass to Demaryius Thomas at the end of the third quarter for their only touchdown of the game. The Chargers pulled to within six points at 16–10 after a TD catch by Gates with 10 minutes left.

The Chargers trailed only 9–3 at the half after holding the Broncos to a field goal each time they entered the red zone. Manning was sick coming into the game, and left late in the second quarter with a thigh injury. Set up by a 58-yard punt return by Royal, Novak kicked a 30-yard field goal before the half ended for the Chargers' first score. Manning began the third quarter, and finished the game completing 14 of 20 passes for 233 yards with one touchdown and no interceptions. Novak missed two field goals in the game: a 46-yard attempt that was tipped by Derek Wolfe in the second quarter, and a 37-yard attempt that hit the left upright in the third. The Chargers were using a new holder with punter Mat McBriar, who was replacing the injured Scifres, but Novak refused to use it as an excuse. Novak placed the blame of the loss on himself, whose missed kicks would have tied the score and kept the game in reach.

Rivers completed 24 of 41 attempts for 232 yards with two interceptions. Gates' touchdown was his 10th of the season, tying him with Gronkowski for most seasons with at least 10 touchdown catches by a tight end. Allen exited the game in the third quarter after suffering both a broken right collarbone and an injured right ankle in the second quarter; the collarbone sidelined him for the final two games of the season. The Chargers' defense limited Denver to 111 yards on 39 carries, an average of 2.8 yards per rush. They also held the Broncos to 3-for-12 on third-down conversions.

==== Week 16: at San Francisco 49ers ====
Week Sixteen: San Diego Chargers at San Francisco 49ers – Game summary

Quarter	1	2	3	4	OT	Total
**Chargers**	0	7	14	14	3	**38**
49ers	7	21	7	0	0	**35**

at Levi's Stadium, Santa Clara, California

- Date: December 20
- Game time: 5:25 pm. PST
- Game weather: 61 °F (16 °C), cloudy
- Game attendance: 70,699
- Referee: Jeff Triplette
- TV announcers (CBS/NFLN): Ian Eagle, Dan Fouts and Jenny Dell
- Recap, Gamebook

Game information

**First quarter**

- SF – Frank Gore 52-yard run (Phil Dawson kick), 13:12. 49ers 7–0. **Drive: 4 plays, 76 yards, 1:48.**

**Second quarter**

- SF – Bruce Ellington 8-yard pass from Colin Kaepernick (Phil Dawson kick), 13:36. 49ers 14–0. **Drive: 10 plays, 67 yards, 5:32.**
- SF – Antoine Bethea 49-yard interception return (Phil Dawson kick), 10:20. 49ers 21–0.
- SDG – Eddie Royal 15-yard pass from Philip Rivers (Nick Novak kick), 5:09. 49ers 21–7. **Drive: 8 plays, 73 yards, 5:11.**
- SF – Bruce Ellington 1-yard run (Phil Dawson kick), 0:06. 49ers 28–7. **Drive: 12 plays, 64 yards, 5:03.**

**Third quarter**

- SDG – Antonio Gates 1-yard pass from Philip Rivers (Nick Novak kick), 5:49. 49ers 28–14. **Drive: 9 plays, 59 yards, 3:26.**
- SDG – Corey Liuget recovered fumble in end zone (Nick Novak kick), 3:26. 49ers 28–21.
- SF – Colin Kaepernick 90-yard run (Phil Dawson kick), 2:26. 49ers 35–21. **Drive: 2 plays, 94 yards, 1:00.**

**Fourth quarter**

- SDG – Antonio Gates 21-yard pass from Philip Rivers (Nick Novak kick), 5:15. 49ers 35–28. **Drive: 9 plays, 85 yards, 3:40.**
- SDG – Malcom Floyd 11-yard pass from Philip Rivers (Nick Novak kick), 0:29. Tied 35–35. **Drive: 14 plays, 80 yards, 3:01.**

**Overtime**

- SDG – Nick Novak 40-yard field goal, 4:00. Chargers 38–35. **Drive: 9 plays, 40 yards, 4:00.**

**Top passers**

- SDG – Philip Rivers – 33/54, 356 yards, 4 TD, 3 INT
- SF – Colin Kaepernick – 15/24, 114 yards, TD

**Top rushers**

- SDG – Branden Oliver – 13 rushes, 53 yards
- SF – Frank Gore – 26 rushes, 158 yards, TD

**Top receivers**

- SDG – Eddie Royal – 10 receptions, 94 yards, TD
- SF – Anquan Boldin – 7 receptions, 61 yards

The Chargers rallied from a 21-point deficit, and Novak kicked the game-winning 40-yard field goal in overtime to defeat the San Francisco 49ers 38–35. Rivers, who sat out practice earlier in the week with back and chest injuries, overcame three interceptions to throw for 356 yards and four TDs. The Chargers, who played the game without injured offensive stars Allen and Mathews, outscored the 49ers 31–7 after halftime. The win kept San Diego's slim playoff chances alive.

The 49ers led 28–7 at halftime, aided by a 49-yard TD return of a Rivers interception by Antoine Bethea. San Francisco rushed for 365 yards, the most the Chargers had surrendered since Adrian Peterson set a single-game record of 296 in 2007. Running back Frank Gore had 158, and quarterback Colin Kaepernick added 151, including a 90-yard TD run in the third quarter. In the fourth, Gates caught one of his two touchdowns in the second half, and Rivers connected with Floyd with 29 seconds remaining for the game-tying score, set up by two long fourth-down conversions earlier in the drive. The game went into overtime after 49ers kicker Phil Dawson missed a 60-yard field goal attempt at the end of regulation. On the opening drive in overtime, Weddle forced a fumble by receiver Quinton Patton, which was recovered by San Diego's Sean Lissemore. The Chargers drove, and Novak hit the game-winner nearly five minutes into the extra period.

Rivers completed 33 of 54 passes in the game. The Chargers were playing with their fifth-string center, and rookie right guard Jeremiah Sirles was making his NFL debut. The offense converted all three of their fourth-down conversions after entering the game with the worst conversions rate at 20% (1-of-5). It was the 49ers fourth consecutive loss. It was only the second time ever that San Francisco had lost after leading by 21 or more at the half.

==== Week 17: at Kansas City Chiefs ====
Week Seventeen: San Diego Chargers at Kansas City Chiefs – Game summary

Quarter	1	2	3	4	Total
Chargers	0	7	0	0	**7**
**Chiefs**	3	13	3	0	**19**

at Arrowhead Stadium, Kansas City, Missouri

- Date: December 28
- Game time: 12:00 pm. CST/10:00 am. PST
- Game weather: 31 °F (−1 °C), clear
- Game attendance: 73,952
- Referee: Pete Morelli
- TV announcers (CBS): Ian Eagle, Dan Fouts and Jenny Dell
- Recap, Gamebook

Game information

**First quarter**

- KC – Cairo Santos 43-yard field goal, 6:38. Chiefs 3–0. **Drive: 11 plays, 54 yards, 6:26.**

**Second quarter**

- KC – Travis Kelce offensive fumble recovery in end zone (Cairo Santos kick), 12:56. Chiefs 10–0. **Drive: 9 plays, 94 yards, 4:39.**
- SDG – Branden Oliver 1-yard run (Nick Novak kick), 10:53. Chiefs 10–7. **Drive: 6 plays, 69 yards, 2:00.**
- KC – Cairo Santos 21-yard field goal, 4:01. Chiefs 13–7. **Drive: 4 plays, 5 yards, 2:09.**
- KC – Cairo Santos 27-yard field goal, 0:36. Chiefs 16–7. **Drive: 7 plays, 41 yards, 1:12.**

**Third quarter**

- KC – Cairo Santos 31-yard field goal, 8:28. Chiefs 19–7. **Drive: 7 plays, 4 yards, 3:01.**

**Fourth quarter**

- No scoring plays.

**Top passers**

- SDG – Philip Rivers – 20/34, 291 yards, 2 INT
- KC – Chase Daniel – 16/27, 157 yards

**Top rushers**

- SDG – Branden Oliver – 14 rushes, 71 yards, TD
- KC – Jamaal Charles – 13 rushes, 54 yards

**Top receivers**

- SDG – Eddie Royal – 4 receptions, 95 yards
- KC – Travis Kelce – 7 receptions, 84 yards

Needing a win to secure a playoff spot, San Diego lost 19–7 to Kansas City, who started backup quarterback Chase Daniel in place of an injured Alex Smith. Justin Houston had four of the Chiefs' seven sacks against Rivers. The Chargers were shut out in the final 41 minutes of the game, which included three trips inside the Chiefs red zone in the fourth quarter. Kansas City swept the season series against San Diego.

The Chiefs went ahead 10–0 two minutes into the second quarter before the Chargers quickly pulled to 10–7, their only score of the game. During one stretch, from the first through third quarter, Rivers was sacked six times while dropping back to pass 13 times, which also included a lost fumble and an interception. The Chargers' offensive line included Robinson, their fifth starting center of the season, and undrafted rookie Sirles, making his first start at right guard. The Chargers seemingly closed the deficit to 19–14 with eight minutes remaining in the fourth when Rivers found Royal for a 3-yard TD, but the play was overturned after a replay ruled that the ball touched the ground while Royal was securing the catch. The Chargers then turned the ball over on downs after two incompletions. Later, with roughly four minutes left, another drive was stalled when Donald Brown was stopped on fourth-and-1 at the Kansas City 20. Rivers threw his second interception of the day on the game's final play.

With the loss, the Bolts had finished 9–7 and were swept by the Chiefs for the first time since 2003.

Rivers was 20-of-34 passing for 291 yards, and finished the season with over 4,000 yards for the sixth time. The seven sacks against him were a career-high. Oliver ran for 71 yards and a touchdown. The Chargers lost right tackle D. J. Fluker, safety Michael Gilchrist, cornerback Shareece Wright, and receiver Royal to injuries during the game.

== Standings ==
=== Division ===
AFC West
	W	L	T	PCT	DIV	CONF	PF	PA	STK
^{(2)} Denver Broncos	12	4	0	.750	6–0	10–2	482	354	W1
Kansas City Chiefs (Note: Kansas City is ranked ahead of San Diego based on head-to-head sweep (Week 7, 23–20; Week 17, 19–7).)	9	7	0	.563	3–3	7–5	353	281	W1
San Diego Chargers	9	7	0	.563	2–4	6–6	348	348	L1
Oakland Raiders	3	13	0	.188	1–5	2–10	253	452	L1

=== Conference ===
AFC
#	Team	Division	W	L	T	PCT	DIV	CONF	SOS	SOV	STK
Division leaders
1 (Note: New England defeated Denver head-to-head (Week 9, 43–21).)	New England Patriots	East	12	4	0	.750	4–2	9–3	.514	.487	L1
2	Denver Broncos	West	12	4	0	.750	6–0	10–2	.521	.484	W1
3 (Note: Pittsburgh defeated Indianapolis head-to-head (Week 8, 51–34).)	Pittsburgh Steelers	North	11	5	0	.688	4–2	9–3	.451	.486	W4
4	Indianapolis Colts	South	11	5	0	.688	6–0	9–3	.479	.372	W1
Wild Cards
5	Cincinnati Bengals	North	10	5	1	.656	3–3	7–5	.498	.425	L1
6	Baltimore Ravens	North	10	6	0	.625	3–3	6–6	.475	.378	W1
Did not qualify for the postseason
7 (Note: Kansas City finished ahead of San Diego in the AFC West based on head-to-head sweep (Week 7, 23–20; Week 17, 19–7). Houston finished ahead of Kansas City and Buffalo based on conference record. Kansas City finished ahead of Buffalo based on head-to-head victory (Week 10, 17–13). San Diego finished ahead of Buffalo based on head-to-head victory (Week 3, 22–10).)	Houston Texans	South	9	7	0	.563	4–2	8–4	.447	.299	W2
8	Kansas City Chiefs	West	9	7	0	.563	3–3	7–5	.512	.500	W1
9	San Diego Chargers	West	9	7	0	.563	2–4	6–6	.512	.403	L1
10	Buffalo Bills	East	9	7	0	.563	4–2	5–7	.516	.486	W1
11	Miami Dolphins	East	8	8	0	.500	3–3	6–6	.512	.406	L1
12	Cleveland Browns	North	7	9	0	.438	2–4	4–8	.479	.371	L5
13	New York Jets	East	4	12	0	.250	1–5	4–8	.543	.375	W1
14 (Note: Jacksonville finished ahead of Oakland based on record vs. common opponents (1–4 to 0–5).)	Jacksonville Jaguars	South	3	13	0	.188	1–5	2–10	.514	.313	L1
15	Oakland Raiders	West	3	13	0	.188	1–5	2–10	.570	.542	L1
16	Tennessee Titans	South	2	14	0	.125	1–5	2–10	.506	.375	L10
Tiebreakers (Note: When breaking ties for three or more teams under the NFL's rules, they are first broken within divisions, then comparing only the highest ranked remaining team from each division.)

== Honors and awards ==
Safety Eric Weddle was the Chargers' only selection to the Pro Bowl. It was the second straight year he was picked, and the third time in four seasons. Voted as first alternates were tight end Antonio Gates and special teams player Darrell Stuckey, while Philip Rivers was selected as a second alternate.

Following are the winners of team awards, which are based on voting by Chargers players:

- MVP: Philip Rivers
- Lineman of the Year: King Dunlap
- Offensive Player of the Year: Antonio Gates
- Defensive Player of the Year: Eric Weddle
- Special Teams Player of the Year: Seyi Ajirotutu
- Most Inspirational: Malcom Floyd and Jarret Johnson
