= Mat McBriar =

Australian gridiron football player (born 1979)

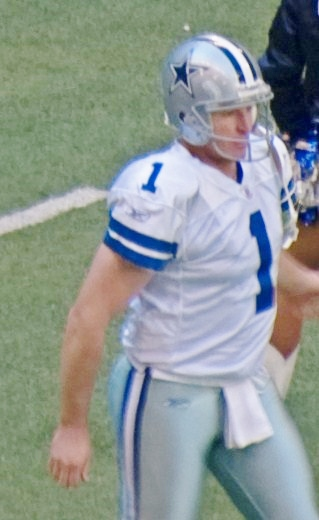
- McBriar with the Dallas Cowboys in 2007

No. 1, 10
- Position: Punter

Personal information
- Born: 8 July 1979 (age 47); Melbourne, Australia
- Listed height: 6 ft 0 in (1.83 m)
- Listed weight: 227 lb (103 kg)

Career information
- High school: Brighton (Melbourne)
- College: Hawaiʻi
- NFL draft: 2003: undrafted

Career history
- Denver Broncos (2003)*; Seattle Seahawks (2003)*; Dallas Cowboys (2003–2011); Philadelphia Eagles (2012); Pittsburgh Steelers (2013); San Diego Chargers (2014)
- * Offseason or practice squad member only

Awards and highlights
- 2× Second-team All-Pro (2006, 2010); 2× Pro Bowl (2006, 2010); All-WAC (2002); Second-team All-WAC (2001)

Career NFL statistics
- Punts: 602
- Punting yards: 27,191
- Punting average: 45.2
- Stats at Pro Football Reference

Mat McBriar (born 8 July 1979) is an Australian former professional player of American football who was a punter in the National Football League (NFL) for the Dallas Cowboys, Philadelphia Eagles, Pittsburgh Steelers and San Diego Chargers. He played college football for the Hawaii Rainbow Warriors.

== Early life ==
McBriar began as an Australian rules football player at Brighton Grammar School and Deakin University (he attended three semesters). At one stage, he entered a junior superkick competition, finishing 3rd overall. He also practiced rowing.

Unlike other countrymen such as Darren Bennett who earlier played in the NFL, McBriar was not a standout athlete in Australia. After performing well at an NFL-sponsored kicking competition in Waverley Park, Bennett helped him receive a football scholarship with the University of Hawaiʻi at Mānoa. There he recorded the Warriors' all-time, single-game record with a 53.8 yards/attempt average against Tulane University on 25 December 2002. After 3 years, he had the second-best career punting average for the Warriors with 42.22 yards per punt behind Jason Elam.

As a junior, he made the second-team All-WAC after averaging 43.4 yards per punt, and earned All-WAC honors as a senior, after registering 48 punts for 2,148 yards (44.8 yards avg), with 12 downed inside the 20-yard line and a long of 73 yards. He finished his college career with 131 punts for 5,531 yards (42.2 avg.) and 32 downed inside the 20-yard line.

In January 2003, McBriar was the first-ever Australian player to be selected to play in the Hula Bowl Maui, as punter for the Kai (North) team.

== Professional career ==
=== Denver Broncos ===
On 28 April 2003, he was signed as an undrafted free agent by the Denver Broncos and had six punts for a 41.5-yard average in the preseason. He was traded to the Seattle Seahawks on 22 August, for a conditional draft choice (not exercised).

=== Seattle Seahawks ===
In 2003, McBriar averaged 44.8 yards on five punts in his only preseason game with the Seattle Seahawks. He was waived on 31 August.

=== Dallas Cowboys ===
On 26 December 2003, he was signed by the Dallas Cowboys to their practice squad, becoming the second Australian to play for the team, after punter/kicker Colin Ridgway. The next year, he was named the starting punter.

In 2006, he registered a 75-yard punt which made the record books as the second longest in Cowboys' history. He was named National Football Conference Special Teams Player of the Week twice and became just the second Australian player to be selected to the Pro Bowl. His league leading 48.2 yards-per-punt average in the 2006 season broke Sam Baker's team record of 45.4 yards per punt, made him the first player to average over 48 yards per punt since 1963 and tied him for fifth best in NFL history. He was the Cowboys' first Pro Bowl punter since 1971.

On 28 February 2007, the Cowboys extended McBriar's contract to a 5-year $8.5-million contract, that included a $2.5-million signing bonus. This contract made him the highest-paid punter in the league. That season, he narrowly missed a Pro Bowl selection, after being chosen as an alternate for the National Football Conference team in case of an injury.

On 12 October 2008, he sustained a season-ending fracture in his kicking foot, after his first career blocked punt, which was also returned for the game-winning touchdown on the final play of an overtime loss against the Arizona Cardinals. Before the injury he was averaging 49 yards per punt and had a 38.8 net punting average.

In 2009, he had a team record 38 punts downed inside the red zone, ranking third in the NFL and sixth all-time in a single season in league history. With the injury of Brad Johnson that same year, he took up holding duties for the Cowboys on field goals and extra point attempts. However, after several missed field goals, holding duties were handed over to Tony Romo in the 13th game versus the San Diego Chargers. McBriar resumed his role as the team's holder during the 2010 season, in which he also was named to his second Pro Bowl, after leading the NFL in both gross punting average (47.9 yards) and net average (41.7). He also had 22 punts downed inside the red zone, with eight touchbacks.

In 2011, he was bothered during the season by a nerve problem that affected his left foot and was placed on the injured reserve list before the final game. He finished the year with a 43.8 gross average and a 36.1 net average per punt. His contract was not renewed after the season, leaving as the franchise career leader in net average (38.1), gross average (45.3) and punts inside the 20-yard line (175).

=== Philadelphia Eagles ===
On 25 July 2012, McBriar signed a one-year contract with the Philadelphia Eagles to compete with Chas Henry for the starting position. He was released on 29 August; however, he was re-signed on 25 September to replace Henry as the team's punter. He was waived on 25 March 2013, although his 46.5 yards average per punt at the time was the highest in Eagles history.

=== Pittsburgh Steelers ===
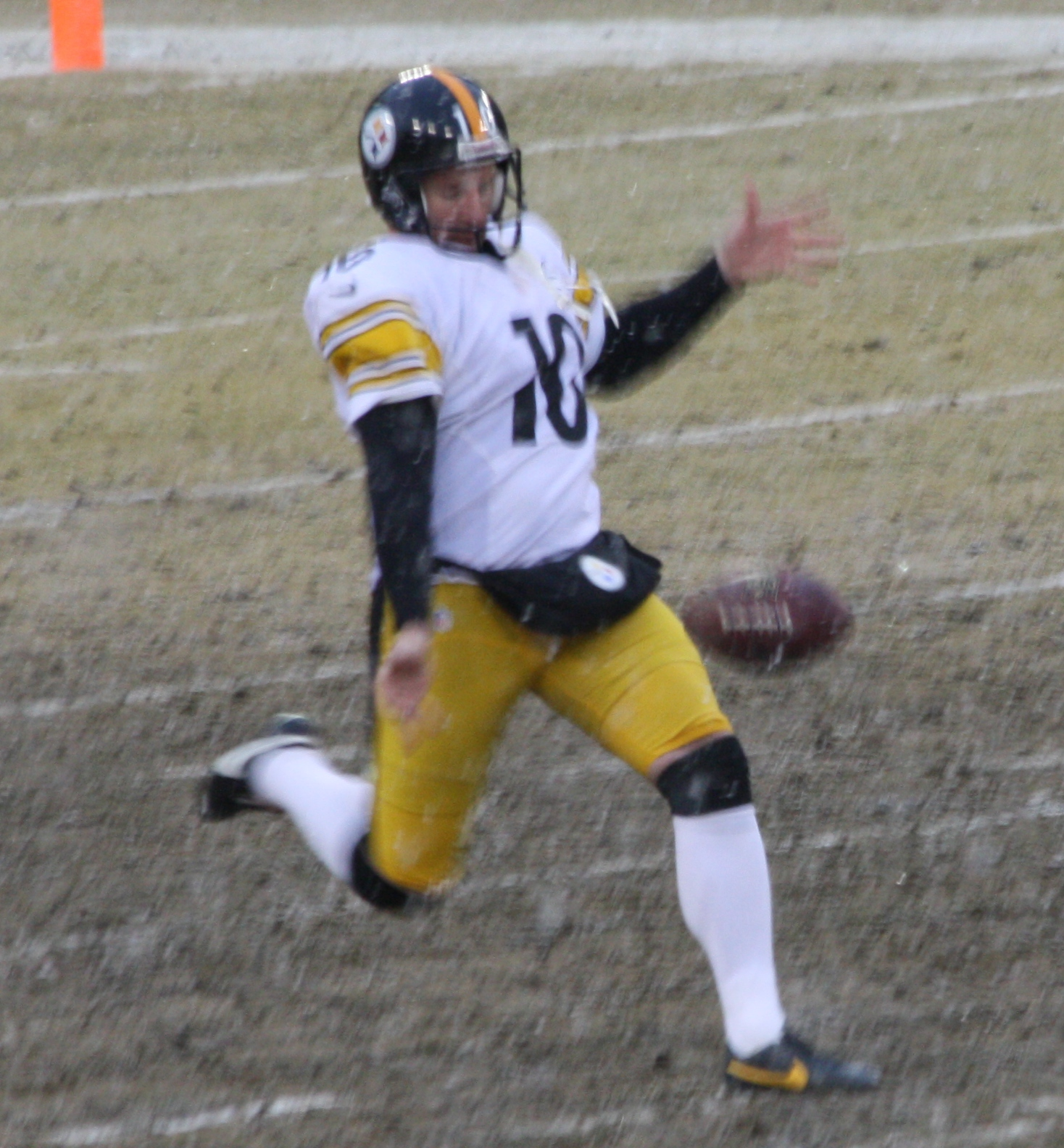
McBriar punting with Pittsburgh

On 29 October 2013, he was signed by the Pittsburgh Steelers to replace Zoltán Meskó. After playing in 9 games and averaging 41.3 yards per punt, his contract was not renewed after the season.

=== San Diego Chargers ===
On 9 December 2014, McBriar signed with the San Diego Chargers to replace the injured Mike Scifres, whose season ended after suffering a broken collarbone. His contract was not renewed at the end of the season. On 22 July 2015, McBriar announced his retirement after playing 11 seasons in the NFL.

== NFL career statistics ==
Legend
	Led the league
**Bold**	Career high

=== Regular season ===
Year	Team	Punting									
Year	Team	GP	Punts	Yds	Net Yds	Lng	Avg	Net Avg	Blk	Ins20	TB
2004	DAL	**16**	75	3,182	2,632	68	42.4	35.1	0	22	7
2005	DAL	**16**	**81**	**3,439**	**3,009**	63	42.5	37.1	0	28	9
2006	DAL	**16**	56	2,697	2,163	**75**	48.2	38.6	0	22	**10**
2007	DAL	**16**	63	2,970	2,424	64	47.1	38.5	0	17	7
2008	DAL	6	24	1,175	971	66	**49.0**	38.8	**1**	5	3
2009	DAL	**16**	72	3,249	2,875	63	45.1	39.9	0	**38**	3
2010	DAL	**16**	65	3,115	2,750	65	47.9	**41.7**	**1**	22	8
2011	DAL	14	58	2,542	2,130	68	43.8	36.1	**1**	21	7
2012	PHI	13	55	2,560	2,042	66	46.5	36.5	**1**	13	7
2013	PIT	9	40	1,652	1,435	70	41.3	35.0	**1**	13	3
2014	SDC	3	13	610	460	58	46.9	35.4	0	1	1
Career		141	602	27,191	22,891	75	45.2	37.7	5	202	65

=== Playoffs ===
Year	Team	Punting									
Year	Team	GP	Punts	Yds	Net Yds	Lng	Avg	Net Avg	Blk	Ins20	TB
2006	DAL	1	5	242	209	**62**	**48.4**	**41.8**	0	0	**1**
2007	DAL	1	4	189	164	58	47.3	41.0	0	3	0
2009	DAL	**2**	**9**	**366**	**337**	61	40.7	37.4	0	**7**	**1**
Career		4	18	797	710	62	44.3	39.4	0	10	2

== Personal life ==
A biography of McBriar's story was published in 2014. An Aussie Takes A Punt - Mat McBriar's Journey From Australia to the NFL was written by F.A. James.
