= Steve Williams (cornerback) =

American football player (born 1991)

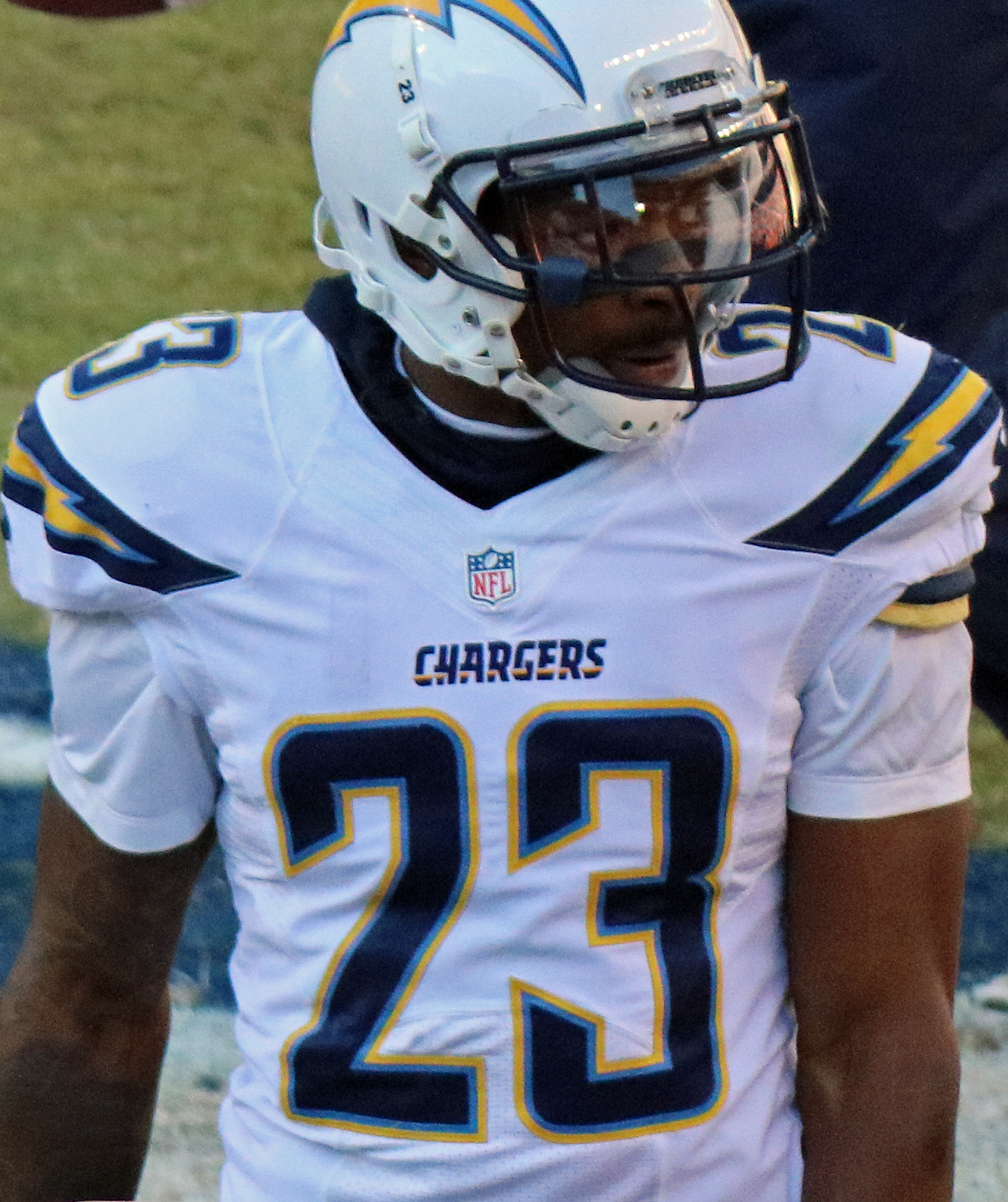
- Williams with the San Diego Chargers in 2015

No. 27, 23, 41, 21, 25
- Position: Cornerback

Personal information
- Born: March 7, 1991 (age 35); Dallas, Texas, U.S.
- Listed height: 5 ft 10 in (1.78 m)
- Listed weight: 185 lb (84 kg)

Career information
- High school: Skyline (Dallas)
- College: California (2009–2012)
- NFL draft: 2013: 5th round, 145th overall pick

Career history
- San Diego Chargers (2013–2015); Los Angeles Rams (2016); San Diego Chargers (2016); Los Angeles Rams (2016); Salt Lake Stallions (2019); Seattle Dragons (2020)

Career NFL statistics
- Total tackles: 38
- Sacks: 1
- Forced fumbles: 2
- Pass deflections: 7
- Interceptions: 2
- Stats at Pro Football Reference

Steven Dwain Williams (born March 7, 1991) is an American former professional football player who was a cornerback in the National Football League (NFL). He played college football for the California Golden Bears. He was selected by the San Diego Chargers in the fifth round of the 2013 NFL draft.

== Early life ==
Williams was born in Dallas, Texas. He attended Skyline High School in Dallas. He was a second-team Class 5A all-state selection as a senior, after his team finished 12-2 overall. He recorded 53 tackles, two interceptions and 10 pass breakups as a 2007 junior to earn second-team All-State and first-team All-District honors. He helped his team to a 12-2 record and won the 5A Region II District 11 title. He was selected to play in the 2009 Under Armour All-America Game.

Considered a four-star recruit by Rivals.com, he was rated as the 24th best cornerback prospect of his class.

== College career ==
Williams attended the University of California, Berkeley, where he played for the Golden Bears from 2009 to 2012. During his career, he played in all 37 games possible with 28 starts during the final three seasons of his four-year career. He posted career totals of 150 tackles, 9.0 tackles for loss (-22 yards), 1.0 sack (-2 yards), six interceptions that he returned for 45 yards, 25 pass breakups, 31 passes defended and three forced fumbles. He entered the 2013 NFL draft after his redshirt junior season.

== Professional career ==
Pre-draft measurables
Height	Weight	40-yard dash	10-yard split	20-yard split	20-yard shuttle	Three-cone drill	Vertical jump	Broad jump	Bench press
5 ft 9 in (1.75 m)	181 lb (82 kg)	4.34 s	1.51 s	2.46 s	4.10 s	6.89 s	40.5 in (1.03 m)	10 ft 8 in (3.25 m)	12 reps
All values from NFL Combine.

=== San Diego Chargers (first stint) ===
On April 27, 2013, Williams was selected in the fifth round of the 2013 NFL draft by the San Diego Chargers.

On August 26, 2013, he was placed on the Injured Reserve list due to a pectoral injury.

On September 14, 2014, Steve Williams made his NFL debut recording two tackles. Williams at times played as the nickel corner on nickel and sub packages. On December 20, 2014 against the San Francisco 49ers, Williams replaced an injured Shareece Wright. Williams recorded 4 tackles and 2 pass deflections.

On September 27, 2015 against the Minnesota Vikings, Williams caught his first career interception from Teddy Bridgewater who was throwing towards the end zone. On January 3, 2016, against the Denver Broncos, Williams recorded a sack, two forced fumbles, and an interception all in the same game.

On September 4, 2016, Williams was waived by the Chargers.

=== Los Angeles Rams (first stint) ===
On September 9, 2016, Williams was signed by the Los Angeles Rams. On September 23, 2016, Williams was waived by the Rams.

=== San Diego Chargers (second stint) ===
On October 5, 2016, Williams was signed by the Chargers. He was released by the Chargers on November 8, 2016.

=== Los Angeles Rams (second stint) ===
On November 23, 2016, Williams was signed by the Rams. He was released on December 21, 2016.

=== Salt Lake Stallions ===
In 2019, Williams joined the Salt Lake Stallions of the Alliance of American Football. The league ceased operations in April 2019.

=== Seattle Dragons ===
In October 2019, Williams was picked by the Seattle Dragons as part of the 2020 XFL draft. He was placed on injured reserve on February 24, 2020. He had his contract terminated when the league suspended operations on April 10, 2020.

== NFL career statistics ==
Year	Team	GP	Tackles				Fumbles			Interceptions					
Year	Team	GP	Cmb	Solo	Ast	Sck	FF	FR	Yds	Int	Yds	Avg	Lng	TD	PD
2014	SD	13	10	10	0	0.0	0	0	0	0	0	0.0	0	0	2
2015	SD	13	19	17	2	1.0	2	0	0	2	6	3.0	6	0	5
2016	SD	5	19	18	1	0.0	0	0	0	0	0	0.0	0	0	2
Career		31	48	45	3	1.0	2	0	0	2	6	3.0	6	0	9
