= Jeremiah Attaochu =

Nigerian-born American football player (born 1993)

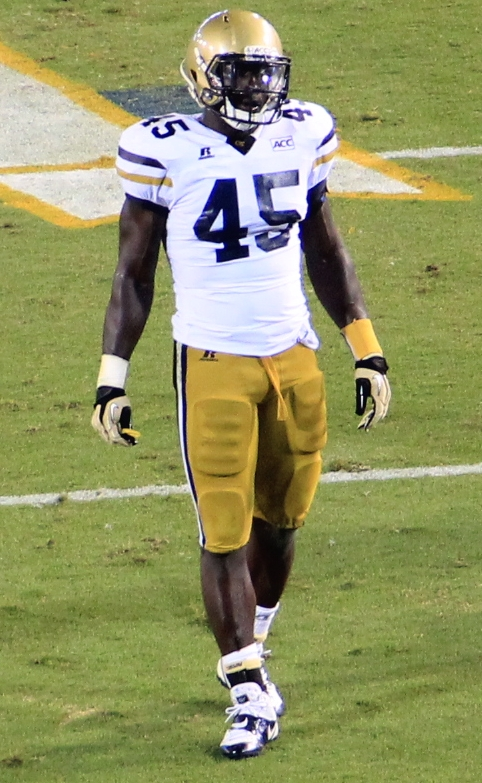
- Attaochu during a Georgia Tech game in 2013

No. 97, 55, 50, 47, 45
- Position: Linebacker

Personal information
- Born: January 17, 1993 (age 33); Ibadan, Nigeria
- Listed height: 6 ft 3 in (1.91 m)
- Listed weight: 252 lb (114 kg)

Career information
- High school: Archbishop Carroll (Washington, D.C., U.S.)
- College: Georgia Tech (2010–2013)
- NFL draft: 2014: 2nd round, 50th overall pick

Career history
- San Diego / Los Angeles Chargers (2014–2017); San Francisco 49ers (2018)*; New York Jets (2018); Kansas City Chiefs (2019)*; Denver Broncos (2019–2020); Chicago Bears (2021); Baltimore Ravens (2022); Los Angeles Chargers (2022)
- * Offseason or practice squad member only

Awards and highlights
- Third-team All-American (2013); Second-team All-ACC (2013)

Career NFL statistics
- Total tackles: 148
- Sacks: 20.5
- Forced fumbles: 4
- Fumble recoveries: 1
- Stats at Pro Football Reference

Jeremiah Ojimaojo Attaochu (born January 17, 1993) is a Nigerian-born former professional American football linebacker. He was selected by the San Diego Chargers in the second round of the 2014 NFL draft. He played college football at Georgia Tech. He was also a member of the San Francisco 49ers, New York Jets, Kansas City Chiefs, Denver Broncos, Chicago Bears, and Baltimore Ravens.

== Early life ==
Attaochu moved with his family to the United States at the age of eight in 2001, where he attended Archbishop Carroll High School in Washington, D.C. He had intended to continue playing soccer but instead decided to try football for Archbishop Carroll as recommended by the school's freshman football coach. He had 118 tackles and 14 sacks as a senior, while recording four touchdowns by blocking kicks or returning fumbles. He played three seasons of varsity football as a linebacker and defensive end, and served two years as team captain.

Considered a three-star recruit by Rivals.com, he accepted a scholarship from Georgia Tech over offers from Illinois, Kansas State and Syracuse.

== College career ==
As a freshman, Attaochu played in all 12 games and started in the Independence Bowl. He finished the year with 23 tackles (18 solo tackles), 4.0 tackles for loss, 3.0 sacks, and one quarterback hurry. In 2011, he played in 11 games and started 10 times, missing two games due to an injury. He led the team in tackles for loss (11.5), sacks (6.0) and finished third in total tackles with 59, intercepted one pass, while breaking up two others and recovering a fumble, earning a conference honorable mention selection. In 2012, he played and started in 13 games. He registered 69 tackles, including 44 solo tackles, had 12 tackles for loss, 10 sacks, one forced fumble and one fumble recovery. He had two sacks in the ACC Championship Game vs. Florida State. In 2013, as a senior, he played and started in all 13 games, recording 45 tackles, including 16 for loss, while adding 12.5 sacks, two pass break ups and one forced fumble, while earning himself All-Atlantic Coast Conference (ACC) and All-American honors.

He finished his career as Georgia Tech's all-time leader in sacks with 31.5, surpassing Greg Gathers' 31 that he set between 1999 and 2002.

== Professional career ==
=== Pre-draft ===
Pre-draft measurables
Height	Weight	Arm length	Hand span	Wingspan	40-yard dash	10-yard split	20-yard split	20-yard shuttle	Three-cone drill	Vertical jump	Broad jump
6 ft 3 1/4 in (1.91 m)	252 lb (114 kg)	33 in (0.84 m)	9 7/8 in (0.25 m)	6 ft 9 1/4 in (2.06 m)	4.58 s	1.55 s	2.65 s	4.64 s	7.28 s	37.5 in (0.95 m)	9 ft 3 in (2.82 m)
All values from NFL Combine/Pro Day

Attaochu sat out drills at the 2014 NFL Combine due to a finger injury (medical exclusion). However, he was able to participate fully on his pro day. He ran the 40-yard dash in 4.58 and a 4.63, had a vertical jump of 37.5 inches, a 3-cone of 7.28, and a short shuttle of 4.64. His 10-yard split was 1.55.

=== San Diego / Los Angeles Chargers (first stint) ===
Attaochu was selected by the San Diego Chargers in the second round of the 2014 NFL draft. In the 2014 season opener against the Arizona Cardinals, Attaochu made an impressive debut, recording one strip sack that forced a fumble and one blocked punt. The two plays helped set up 10 points for San Diego in an 18–17 loss.

In 2016, Attaochu missed three games with a sprained ankle suffered in Week 6 and then suffering a broken foot in Week 10. He was placed on injured reserve on December 3, 2016. He finished 2016 with eight tackles, two sacks, nine pressures and seven quarterback hits over eight games.

=== San Francisco 49ers ===
On March 15, 2018, Attaochu signed with the San Francisco 49ers. He was released on September 1, 2018.

=== New York Jets ===
On September 3, 2018, Attaochu signed with the New York Jets. He played in 11 games before being placed on injured reserve on December 19, 2018.

=== Kansas City Chiefs ===
On April 8, 2019, Attaochu signed with the Kansas City Chiefs. He was released by the team on September 1, 2019.

=== Denver Broncos ===
On October 1, 2019, Attaochu was signed by the Denver Broncos. In week 14 against the Houston Texans, Attaochu sacked Deshaun Watson twice and recovered a fumble lost by wide receiver Keke Coutee and gave the ball to teammate Kareem Jackson who returned the fumble for a 70-yard touchdown during the 38–24 win.

On March 30, 2020, the Broncos re-signed Attaochu to a one-year, $1.5 million contract.

=== Chicago Bears ===
Attaochu signed a two-year contract with the Chicago Bears on March 23, 2021. He suffered a torn pec in Week 5 and was placed on injured reserve on October 13, 2021. He was released on June 13, 2022.

=== Baltimore Ravens ===
On September 27, 2022, Attaochu was signed to the practice squad of the Baltimore Ravens. He was released on October 18, 2022.

=== Los Angeles Chargers (second stint) ===
On October 26, 2022, the Los Angeles Chargers signed Attaochu to their active roster. He was released on November 26 and re-signed to the practice squad. His practice squad contract with the team expired after the season on January 14, 2023.

== NFL career statistics ==
Legend
**Bold**	Career high

Year	Team	Games		Tackles					Interceptions					Fumbles			
Year	Team	GP	GS	Cmb	Solo	Ast	Sck	TFL	Int	Yds	TD	Lng	PD	FF	FR	Yds	TD
2014	SDG	11	0	10	8	2	2.0	1	0	0	0	0	**1**	**1**	0	0	0
2015	SDG	**15**	**12**	**55**	**44**	**11**	**6.0**	**15**	0	0	0	0	**1**	**1**	0	0	0
2016	SDG	8	1	11	10	1	2.0	2	0	0	0	0	0	0	0	0	0
2017	LAC	4	0	7	6	1	0.0	1	0	0	0	0	0	0	0	0	0
2018	NYJ	11	0	9	7	2	2.0	1	0	0	0	0	0	**1**	0	0	0
2019	DEN	12	5	21	14	7	3.5	5	0	0	0	0	0	0	**1**	**1**	0
2020	DEN	13	5	31	24	7	5.0	6	0	0	0	0	0	**1**	0	0	0
2021	CHI	5	0	2	1	1	0.0	0	0	0	0	0	0	0	0	0	0
2022	BAL	1	0	2	2	0	0.0	1	0	0	0	0	0	0	0	0	0
2022	LAC	2	0	0	0	0	0.0	0	0	0	0	0	0	0	0	0	0
Career		82	23	148	116	32	20.5	32	0	0	0	0	2	4	1	1	0
