= John Phillips (American football) =

American football player (born 1987)

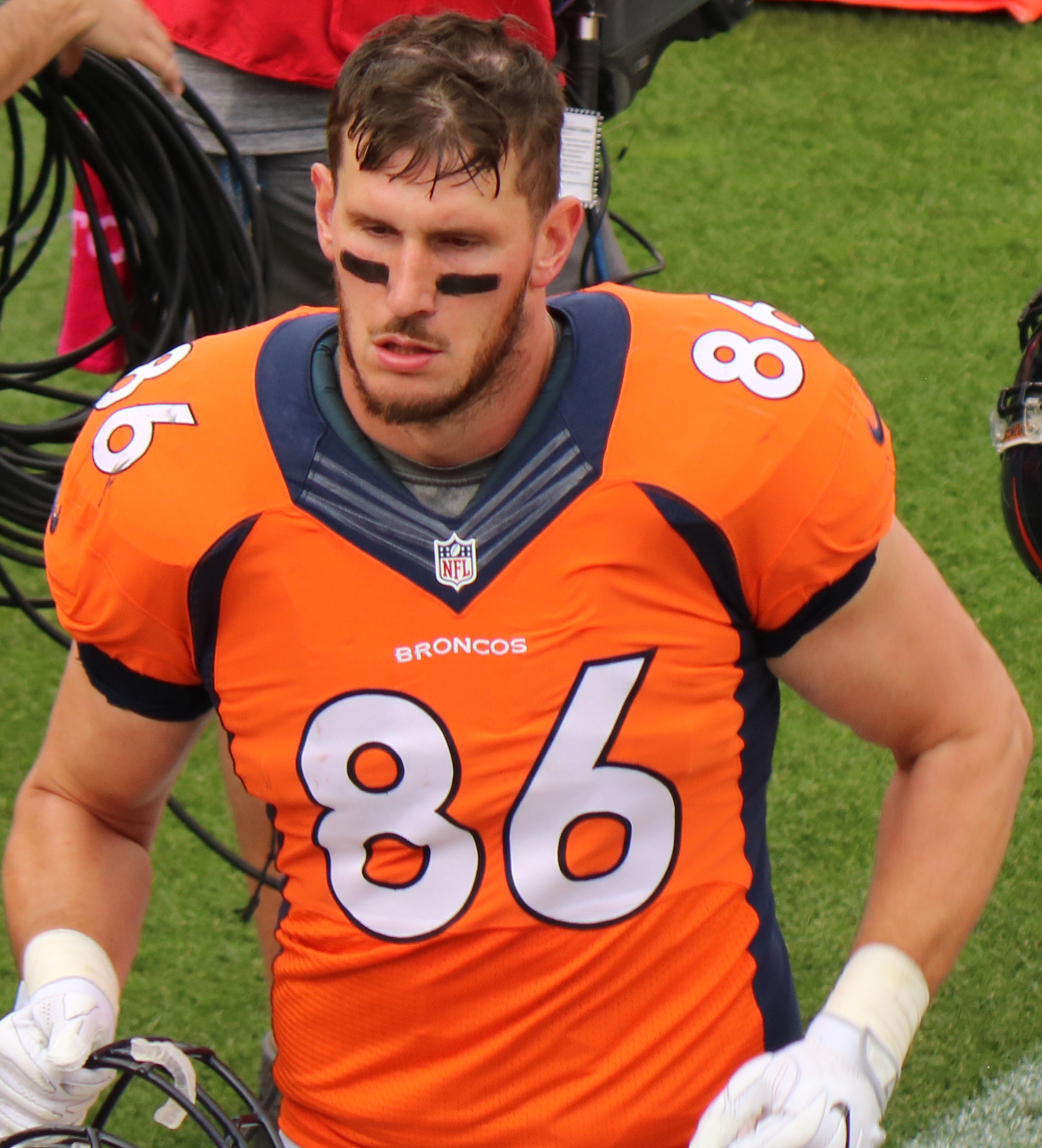
- Phillips with the Denver Broncos in 2016

No. 89, 83, 86, 82
- Position: Tight end

Personal information
- Born: June 11, 1987 (age 39); Low Moor, Virginia, U.S.
- Listed height: 6 ft 5 in (1.96 m)
- Listed weight: 251 lb (114 kg)

Career information
- High school: Bath County (Hot Springs, Virginia)
- College: Virginia (2005–2008)
- NFL draft: 2009: 6th round, 208th overall pick

Career history
- Dallas Cowboys (2009–2012); San Diego Chargers (2013–2015); Denver Broncos (2016); New Orleans Saints (2016–2017); Arizona Cardinals (2018); Kansas City Chiefs (2019)*
- * Offseason or practice squad member only

Awards and highlights
- First-team All-ACC (2008)

Career NFL statistics
- Games played: 120
- Receptions: 58
- Receiving yards: 428
- Receiving touchdowns: 5
- Stats at Pro Football Reference

John Phillips (born June 11, 1987) is an American former professional football player who was a tight end in the National Football League (NFL) for the Dallas Cowboys, San Diego Chargers, Denver Broncos, New Orleans Saints, and Arizona Cardinals. He played college football for the Virginia Cavaliers and was selected by the Cowboys in the sixth round of the 2009 NFL draft.

== Early life ==
Phillips attended Bath County High School in Hot Springs, Virginia. In football, he was a two-way player at tight end and defensive end. As a junior, he tallied 25 receptions for 495 yards and six touchdowns in 10 games. He was named first-team All-state at tight end and second-team at defensive end.

As a senior, he had 40 receptions for 714 yards and five touchdowns. He was an All-state selection at tight end and was named the Roanoke Times Defensive Player of the Year. He finished his high school career with 87 receptions for 1,513 yards, 16 touchdowns, 324 tackles and 42 sacks.

He was a three-time All-district selection in both basketball and baseball. He received All-state honors in baseball as a senior.

== College career ==
Phillips accepted a football scholarship from the University of Virginia. As a freshman, he appeared in all 12 games with three starts, making two receptions for 27 yards and one touchdown. As a sophomore, he appeared in all 12 games with four starts, catching two receptions for 65 yards.

As a junior, he shared the tight end position with Tom Santi and Jonathan Stupar. He appeared in 13 games with eight starts, posting 17 receptions for 193 yards and two touchdowns.

Phillips blossomed as a senior, becoming a full-time starter, team captain and a first-team All-ACC selection. He started all 12 games and totaled 48 receptions, which at the time ranked second-best by a tight end in school history. He also tallied 385 yards and two touchdowns.

He finished his college career with 49 games appearances (32 starts), 69 receptions for 670 yards and five touchdowns.

== Professional career ==
=== Dallas Cowboys ===
Phillips was selected by the Dallas Cowboys in the sixth round (208th overall) of the 2009 NFL draft and surprised observers by making the team. In 2009, he had seven catches for 62 yards, while mostly being used as a blocking tight end.

In the 2010 preseason, he was impressing the coaching staff with his skills as a receiver and his ability to take different assignments, including the H-Back role. His performance was starting to push Martellus Bennett for the backup tight end job behind Jason Witten, but he was lost for the year in the preseason opener, when he suffered a season-ending ACL tear. It has been speculated that he was never the same player following this injury.

The 2011, he returned in a backup role, posting career-highs with 15 receptions for 101 yards, 15 special teams tackles (second on the team) and one forced fumble.

In 2012, Bennett left in free agency and Phillips had a solid season as the backup tight end behind Witten. He started nine out of 16 games, serving mainly as an H-Back or blocking tight end. He had eight receptions for 55 yards, one touchdown, six special teams tackles and one fumble recovery. He was not re-signed after the season.

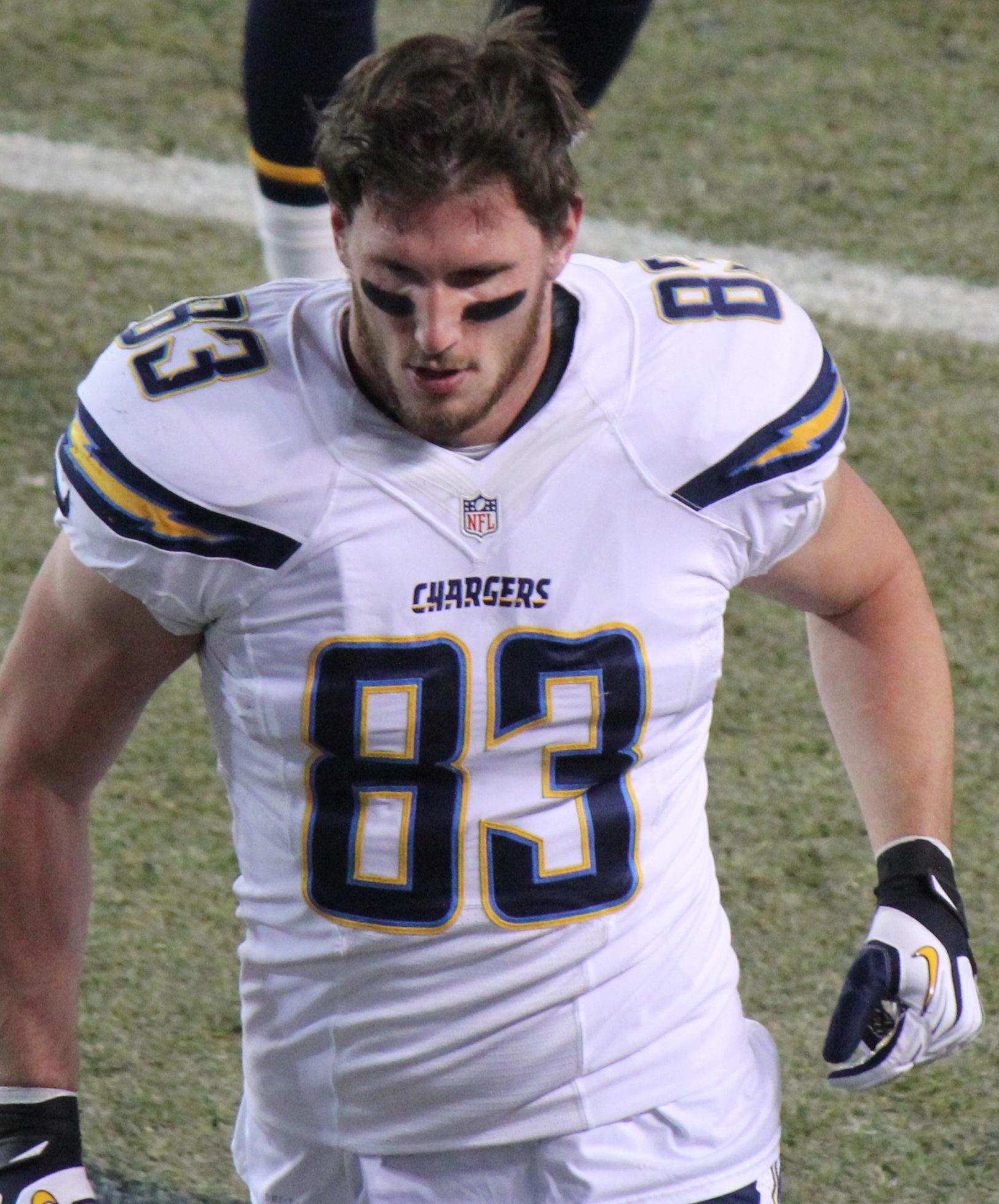
Phillips with the Chargers.

=== San Diego Chargers ===
On March 12, 2013, Phillips signed as a free agent with the San Diego Chargers. He was used as a blocking specialist until being placed on the injured reserve list, after suffering ACL and MCL tears in his right knee during the fifteenth game against the Oakland Raiders. He appeared in 15 games (six starts), posting four receptions for 30 yards, one touchdown and four special teams tackles.

In 2014, he came back to play in all of the 16 games with one start, while collecting one reception for a one-yard touchdown and 10 special teams tackles.

In 2015, he was released on September 5, only to be re-signed five days later, after Ladarius Green suffered his second concussion of the year and Antonio Gates was still serving an NFL suspension. He was the starter in the third and fourth game of the season, making a critical touchdown reception against the Cleveland Browns. After Gates returned in the fifth game, Phillips was used mainly for blocking purposes. He played in 16 games (five starts), while posting 10 receptions for 69 yards, one touchdown and five special teams tackles.

=== Denver Broncos ===
On July 28, 2016, Phillips was signed as a free agent by the Denver Broncos. He overcame a serious ankle injury he suffered in his second day in training camp to make the team. On November 5, he was released by the Broncos. He appeared in eight games with three starts, registering five receptions for 40 yards and one touchdown.

=== New Orleans Saints ===
On November 7, 2016, he was claimed off waivers by the New Orleans Saints. He appeared in eight games (four starts), making five receptions for 32 yards, while contributing as a blocking tight end and on special teams.

On March 29, 2017, Phillips re-signed with the Saints on a one-year contract. On August 29, Phillips was placed on injured reserve, and later released on September 8. He was re-signed on December 19, but was once again released on December 29. He was re-signed again on January 3, 2018. He appeared in one regular season game and did not record any stat.

On August 5, 2018, Phillips re-signed with the Saints. He was released on September 1.

=== Arizona Cardinals ===
On October 30, 2018, he was signed by the Arizona Cardinals to serve as a blocking tight end. He appeared in the final eight games (four starts), making three receptions for 38 yards. He was not re-signed after the season.

=== Kansas City Chiefs ===
On May 20, 2019, Phillips signed with the Kansas City Chiefs. On May 28, he was released after spending eight days in training camp. He finished his career after appearing in 120 games with 43 starts, while recording 58 receptions for 426 yards and five touchdowns.

== Personal life ==
Phillips married soccer player Nikki Krzysik in 2013.
