= Bath County Public Schools =

School district in Virginia, United States

- 12145 Sam Snead HWY Warm Springs, VA, 24484

District information
- Grades: PK–12
- Superintendent: John Taylor (2026)
- Schools: 3
- NCES District ID: 5100330

Students and staff
- Students: 509 (2024–25)
- Teachers: 56.00 (on an FTE basis)
- Student–teacher ratio: 9.09

Other information
- Website: www.bath.k12.va.us

Bath County Public Schools is a school division of Bath County, Virginia.

In 2026 John Taylor became the superintendent.

== Schools ==
- Bath County High School
- Millboro Elementary School
- Valley Elementary School
