= Bath County High School (Virginia) =

Coordinates: 38.0340°N 79.7951°W

Location
- 464 Charger Lane, Hot Springs VA; Hot Springs, Virginia 24445-9802; United States

Information
- School type: Public
- Locale: Rural, Remote
- School district: Bath County Public Schools
- NCES District ID: 5100330
- NCES School ID: 510033000139
- Principal: Johnathan R. Taylor
- Teaching staff: 5.05 (on an FTE basis)
- Grades: 8–12
- Enrollment: 182 (2024–25)
- Student to teacher ratio: 36.04
- Colors: Black and Orange
- Slogan: "The Best Small High School in Virginia!"
- Athletics conference: VHSL Class 1 VHSL Region C VHSL Pioneer District
- Mascot: Charger
- Rivals: Covington High School; James River High School
- Website: https://www.bchs.bath.k12.va.us/o/bchs

Bath County High School—the only high school in Bath County, Virginia—is a VHSL Class 1 high school serving 182 students in grades 8–12.

== Athletics ==
BCHS has had athletic success over the years. Most notably, future William & Mary quarterback Jacob Phillips and his younger brother, future Virginia Tight End John Phillips, led the varsity football team to the Class A Division 1 state title in 2003. Pitcher Jailyn Ford led the softball team to a Class A Division 1 state title in 2012.

== Notable alumni ==
- Creigh Deeds (1976), Virginia Senator (25th District)
- Jailyn Ford (2012), NPF Pitcher
- John Phillips (2005), NFL Tight End
