= David Lonie =

Australian gridiron football player (born 1979)

No. 6
- Position: Punter

Personal information
- Born: 6 May 1979 (age 47); Gosford, Australia
- Listed height: 6 ft 6 in (1.98 m)
- Listed weight: 220 lb (100 kg)

Career information
- College: University of California
- NFL draft: 2006: undrafted

Career history
- Washington Redskins (2006)*; Green Bay Packers (2007)
- * Offseason or practice squad member only

David Lonie (born 6 May 1979) is an Australian former American football punter.

== College career ==
Lonie attended UC Berkeley in California.

== Career ==
After going undrafted in the 2006 NFL draft, Lonie was signed by the Washington Redskins on May 1. He was later waived on August 28, 2006.

Lonie signed with the Green Bay Packers in February 2007, but injured his ankle during training camp and was placed on injured reserve. He was released in October of that year after working a settlement with the Packers.
