= Rayshawn Jenkins =

American football player (born 1994)

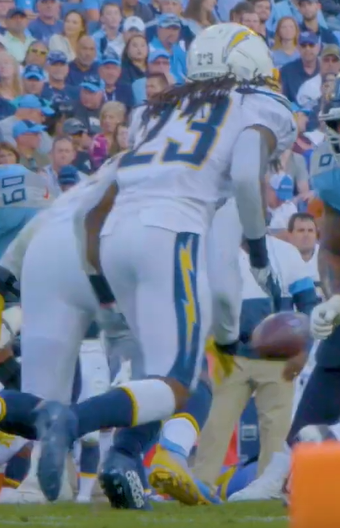
- Jenkins with the Los Angeles Chargers in 2019

No. 36 – Baltimore Ravens
- Position: Safety
- Roster status: Practice squad

Personal information
- Born: January 25, 1994 (age 32); St. Petersburg, Florida, U.S.
- Listed height: 6 ft 1 in (1.85 m)
- Listed weight: 220 lb (100 kg)

Career information
- High school: Admiral Farragut Academy (St. Petersburg)
- College: Miami (FL) (2012–2016)
- NFL draft: 2017: 4th round, 113th overall pick

Career history
- Los Angeles Chargers (2017–2020); Jacksonville Jaguars (2021–2023); Seattle Seahawks (2024); Cleveland Browns (2025); Pittsburgh Steelers (2026); Baltimore Ravens (2026–present)*
- * Offseason or practice squad member only

Career NFL statistics as of 2026
- Total tackles: 578
- Sacks: 5.5
- Forced fumbles: 4
- Fumble recoveries: 2
- Pass deflections: 34
- Interceptions: 11
- Defensive touchdowns: 2
- Stats at Pro Football Reference

Rayshawn Sharodd Jenkins (born January 25, 1994) is an American professional football safety for the Baltimore Ravens of the National Football League (NFL). He played college football at Miami (FL). He was selected by the Los Angeles Chargers in the fourth round of the 2017 NFL draft.

== Professional career ==
=== Pre-draft ===
On December 5, 2016, it was announced that Jenkins had accepted his invitation to the 2017 Senior Bowl. During Senior Bowl practices, he got into a physical altercation with Grambling State's wide receiver Chad Williams. After the fight, coach Hue Jackson abruptly ended practice and addressed the South team players, stating that Jenkins and Williams had both possibly hurt their draft stock and made a poor impression. On January 28, 2017, Jenkins made two combined tackles and helped Cleveland Browns head coach Hue Jackson's South team that defeated the North 16–15. Jenkins was one of 60 defensive backs that attended the NFL Scouting Combine in Indianapolis, Indiana. He finished ninth in the broad jump and 22nd among all defensive backs in the 40-yard dash. On March 29, 2017, Jenkins attended Miami's pro day, but opted to stand on his combine numbers and only performed the short shuttle, three-cone drill, and positional drills. During the draft process, Jenkins attended private meetings and workouts with the Minnesota Vikings and Tampa Bay Buccaneers. At the conclusion of the pre-draft process, he was projected to be a third to fifth round pick by NFL draft experts and scouts. Jenkins was ranked the fifth-best free safety by NFLDraftScout.com.

Pre-draft measurables
Height	Weight	Arm length	Hand span	Wingspan	40-yard dash	10-yard split	20-yard split	20-yard shuttle	Three-cone drill	Vertical jump	Broad jump	Bench press
6 ft 1 in (1.85 m)	214 lb (97 kg)	32 3/4 in (0.83 m)	9 5/8 in (0.24 m)	6 ft 5 3/8 in (1.97 m)	4.51 s	1.51 s	2.61 s	4.20 s	7.06 s	37 in (0.94 m)	10 ft 8 in (3.25 m)	19 reps
All values from NFL Combine/Miami's Pro Day

=== Los Angeles Chargers ===
The Los Angeles Chargers selected Jenkins in the fourth round (113th overall) of the 2017 NFL draft. He was the 14th safety drafted in 2017.

==== 2017 ====
On May 17, 2017, the Los Angeles Chargers signed Jenkins to a four-year, $3.06 million contract that includes an initial signing bonus of $662,209. Throughout training camp, he competed against Dwight Lowery, Tre Boston, Darrell Stuckey, Dexter McCoil, and Adrian Phillips for snaps at safety. Head coach Anthony Lynn named Jenkins the third strong safety on the depth chart, behind Jahleel Addae and Adrian Phillips.

On September 10, 2017, Jenkins made his professional regular season debut, but was limited to special teams during a 24–21 loss at the Denver Broncos. The following week, he was inactive as a healthy scratch as the Chargers lost 17–10 to the Miami Dolphins. On September 24, 2017, he recorded his first career tackle on Akeem Hunt during a kick return in the second quarter of a 24–10 loss to the Kansas City Chiefs. On October 15, 2017, Jenkins recorded a season-high two solo tackles in a 21–0 victory over the Denver Broncos. He finished his rookie season with 13 combined tackles (ten solo) and a pass deflection in 15 games and zero starts.

==== 2018 ====
The Los Angeles Chargers drafted Derwin James 17th overall to be the starting strong safety. Defensive coordinator Gus Bradley held an open competition during training camp to name a new starting free safety after the Chargers chose not to re-sign Tre Boston. Jenkins competed for the role against Jahleel Addae, Desmond King, and Jaylen Watkins. On October 24, 2018, Jenkins collected a season-high eight combined tackles (four solo) and was credited with half a sack on Baker Mayfield during 38–14 victory at the Cleveland Browns. He was inactive during the Chargers' Week 9 victory at the Seattle Seahawks. On December 30, 2018, Jenkins earned his first career start as a nickelback and made seven combined tackles (five solo) during a 23–9 victory at the Denver Broncos. He finished the 2018 NFL season with a total of 23 combined tackles (18 solo) and was credited with half a sack in 15 games and one start. He finished the season with 23 combined tackles (18 solo) and was credited with half a sack in 15 games and one start.

The Los Angeles Chargers finished second in the AFC West with a 12–4 record, earning a Wildcard position. On January 6, 2019, Jenkins started as a comeback in the first postseason game of his career and made four combined tackles (three solo) in the Chargers' 23–7 victory at the Baltimore Ravens in the AFC Wildcard. On January 13, 2019, he made nine combined tackles (five solo) as the Chargers were defeated 28–41 at the New England Patriots in the Divisional Round.

==== 2019 ====
Throughout training camp, defensive coordinator Gus Bradley held an open competition between Jenkins, Derwin James, and rookie Nasir Adderley to name the starting free safety after Jahleel Addae was released during the off-season. Head coach Anthony Lynn named Jenkins the starting free safety to begin the season, alongside Adrian Phillips, after Derwin James and Nassir Adderley sustained injuries.

In Week 2 against the Detroit Lions, Jenkins recorded his first career interception off Matthew Stafford in the 13–10 loss. He finished the season leading the team in defensive snaps, recording 54 tackles, four passes defensed, and a team-leading three interceptions through 16 starts.

==== 2020 ====
In Week 3 of the 2020 season against the Carolina Panthers, Jenkins recorded his first career full sack on Teddy Bridgewater during the 21–16 loss.

=== Jacksonville Jaguars ===
On March 17, 2021, the Jacksonville Jaguars signed Jenkins to a four–year, $35 million contract that included $16 million guaranteed upon signing and an initial signing bonus of $8 million. He entered the 2021 season as the Jaguars starting free safety. He suffered a broken ankle in Week 15 and was placed on injured reserve on December 21, 2021, ending his season. He finished the season with 73 tackles and three passes defensed through 14 starts.

In Week 2 of the 2022 season, against the Indianapolis Colts, Jenkins recorded his first interception as a member of the Jaguars off a pass from Matt Ryan in the 24–0 victory. Jenkins made two key plays that helped propel the Jaguars to a division title in the 2022 NFL season. In Week 15 against the Dallas Cowboys, Jenkins recorded a team-high 18 combined tackles and had two interceptions, one of which he returned for a touchdown in overtime to win the game for the Jaguars. In a Week 18 win-and-in game against the Tennessee Titans, with the Titans leading 16–13, Jenkins caused a fumble while as he sacked Titans quarterback Joshua Dobbs. The fumble was recovered by teammate Josh Allen, who returned it for a touchdown to give the Jaguars a 20–16 lead. The Jaguars held on to win, thus allowing them to clinch the AFC South and a trip to the playoffs.

On March 5, 2024, Jenkins was released by the Jaguars.

=== Seattle Seahawks ===
On March 13, 2024, the Seattle Seahawks signed Jenkins to a two–year, $12.00 million contract that includes $6.26 million guaranteed upon signing and an initial signing bonus of $5.00 million. In Week 5 against the New York Giants, Jenkins recorded a 102-yard fumble return for a touchdown. On October 16, he was placed on injured reserve. He was activated on November 23.

On March 4, 2025, Jenkins was released by the Seahawks.

=== Cleveland Browns ===
On May 12, 2025, Jenkins signed with the Cleveland Browns. He played in 13 games with nine starts for the Browns, recording 45 tackles, one pass deflection, one interception, one forced fumble and recovery.

=== Pittsburgh Steelers ===
On August 2, 2026, Jenkins signed with the Pittsburgh Steelers. On October 21, he was released.

=== Baltimore Ravens ===
On October 26, 2026, Jenkins was signed to the Baltimore Ravens practice squad.

== NFL career statistics ==
Legend
	Led the league
**Bold**	Career high

=== Regular season ===
Year	Team	Games		Tackling					Fumbles				Interceptions					
Year	Team	GP	GS	Comb	Solo	Ast	Sck	TFL	FF	FR	Yds	TD	Int	Yds	Avg	Lng	TD	PD
2017	LAC	15	0	13	10	3	0.0	0	0	0	0	0	0	0	0.0	0	0	1
2018	LAC	15	1	23	13	10	0.5	1	0	0	0	0	0	0	0.0	0	0	0
2019	LAC	16	16	54	34	20	0.0	2	0	0	0	0	**3**	10	3.3	8	0	4
2020	LAC	15	15	84	58	26	1.0	4	0	0	0	0	2	23	11.5	23	0	4
2021	JAX	14	14	73	56	17	0.0	1	0	0	0	0	0	0	0.0	0	0	3
2022	JAX	17	17	**116**	**73**	**43**	1.0	3	**3**	0	0	0	**3**	**64**	**21.3**	**52**	**1**	**12**
2023	JAX	17	17	101	66	35	1.0	**7**	0	0	0	0	2	42	21.0	24	0	9
2024	SEA	13	9	53	34	19	**2.0**	2	0	**1**	**102**	**1**	0	0	0.0	0	0	0
2025	CLE	17	3	45	19	26	0.0	0	1	**1**	0	0	1	9	9.0	9	0	1
2026	PIT	6	1	16	10	6	0.0	0	0	0	0	0	0	0	0.0	0	0	0
Career		145	93	578	373	205	5.5	20	4	2	102	1	11	148	13.5	52	1	34

=== Postseason ===
Year	Team	Games		Tackling					Fumbles				Interceptions					
Year	Team	GP	GS	Comb	Solo	Ast	Sck	TFL	FF	FR	Yds	TD	Int	Yds	Avg	Lng	TD	PD
2018	LAC	2	2	13	**8**	5	0.0	0	0	0	0	0	0	0	0.0	0	0	0
2022	JAX	2	2	**14**	**8**	**6**	0.0	0	0	0	0	0	0	0	0.0	0	0	**1**
Career		4	4	27	16	11	0.0	0	0	0	0	0	0	0	0.0	0	0	1
