= Marcus Gilchrist =

American football player (born 1988)

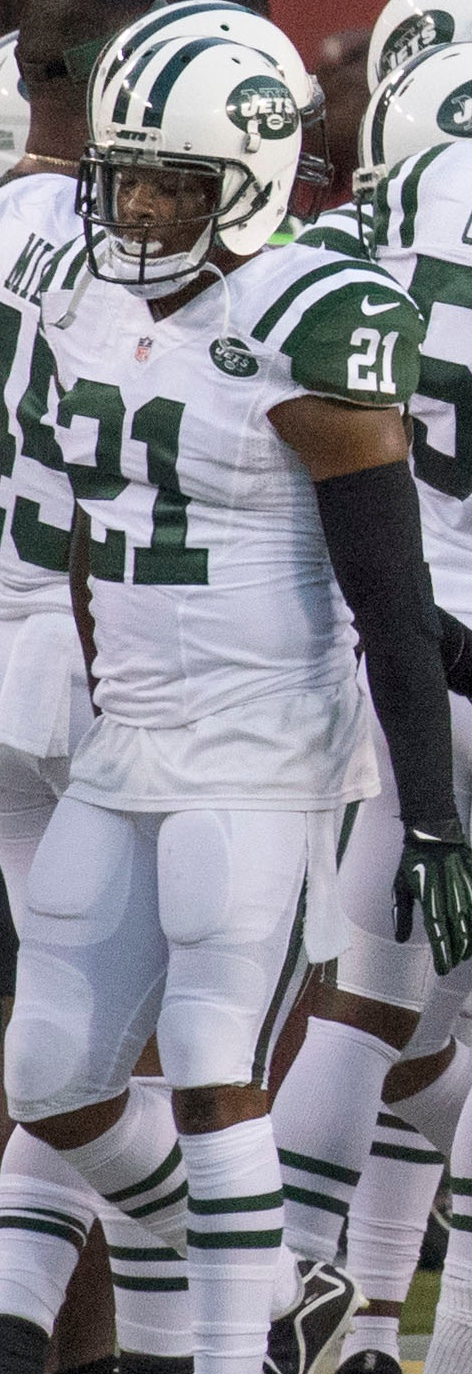
- Gilchrist with the New York Jets in 2016

No. 38, 21, 31, 29
- Position: Safety

Personal information
- Born: December 8, 1988 (age 37); High Point, North Carolina, U.S.
- Listed height: 5 ft 10 in (1.78 m)
- Listed weight: 200 lb (91 kg)

Career information
- High school: T. Wingate Andrews (High Point)
- College: Clemson
- NFL draft: 2011: 2nd round, 50th overall pick

Career history
- San Diego Chargers (2011–2014); New York Jets (2015–2016); Houston Texans (2017); Oakland Raiders (2018); Detroit Lions (2019); Jacksonville Jaguars (2019); Baltimore Ravens (2020)

Career NFL statistics
- Total tackles: 502
- Sacks: 4.0
- Forced fumbles: 5
- Fumble recoveries: 2
- Interceptions: 14
- Stats at Pro Football Reference

Marcus Tyler Gilchrist (born December 8, 1988) is an American former professional football player who was a safety in the National Football League (NFL). He played college football for the Clemson Tigers. He was selected by the San Diego Chargers in the second round of the 2011 NFL draft and also had stints with the New York Jets, Houston Texans, Oakland Raiders, Detroit Lions, Jacksonville Jaguars, and Baltimore Ravens.

== College career ==
At Clemson, Gilchrist played with four of his defensive teammates who were selected in the 2011 NFL draft. According to the Tigers' coaches though, it was his football IQ that made him stand out, along with an impressive showing at the NFL Combine where he posted a 38-inch vertical leap and put up 26 bench-press repetitions at 225 pounds, second-most among all defensive backs.

== Professional career ==
External videos
- Marcus Gilchrist's NFL Combine Workout

Pre-draft measurables
Height	Weight	Arm length	Hand span	Wingspan	40-yard dash	10-yard split	20-yard split	20-yard shuttle	Three-cone drill	Vertical jump	Broad jump	Bench press
5 ft 10 in (1.78 m)	195 lb (88 kg)	31 3/8 in (0.80 m)	8 1/2 in (0.22 m)	6 ft 2 3/8 in (1.89 m)	4.54 s	1.64 s	2.66 s	4.12 s	6.81 s	38.5 in (0.98 m)	10 ft 6 in (3.20 m)	26 reps
All values from NFL Combine/Pro Day

=== San Diego Chargers ===
==== 2011 ====
The San Diego Chargers selected Gilchrist in the second round (50th overall) of the 2011 NFL draft. He was the sixth cornerback drafted and was the first of two cornerbacks the Chargers drafted in 2011.

External videos
- Chargers draft Marcus Gilchrist 50th overall

On July 29, 2011, the Chargers signed Gilchrist to a four-year, $3.95 million contract that includes a signing bonus of $1.37 million.

Throughout training camp, Gilchrist competed to be the third cornerback on the depth chart and the first-team nickelback. He competed against Dante Hughes and fellow rookie Shareece Wright. Head coach Norv Turner named Gilchrist the third cornerback on the depth chart to begin the regular season, behind Quentin Jammer and Antoine Cason. He was also given the role as the first-team nickelback.

He made his professional regular season debut in the San Diego Chargers' season-opener against the Minnesota Vikings and recorded one tackle in their 24–17 victory. Gilchrist made his first career tackle on Michael Jenkins during an 11-yard reception in the second quarter. On October 2, 2011, Gilchrist earned his first career start after replacing Quentin Jammer who was inactive due to a hamstring injury. He made six solo tackles, two pass deflections, and made his first career interception during a 26–16 victory against the Miami Dolphins in Week 4. His interception came off a pass attempt by quarterback Chad Henne that was originally intended for tight end Anthony Fasano in the first quarter. In Week 8, he replaced Antoine Cason in the starting lineup after Cason was unable to contain New York Jets' wide receiver Plaxico Burress the previous week. Gilchrist remained the starter in Week 9 and recorded a season-high nine combined tackles during a 45–38 loss against the Green Bay Packers. He was inactive for two games (Weeks 11–12) after injuring his hamstring in Week 10. On December 11, 2011, Gilchrist broke up a pass and made an interception during a 37–10 victory against the Buffalo Bills. He intercepted a pass by Tyler Thigpen in the fourth quarter. He finished his rookie season with 34 combined tackles (27 solo), four pass deflections, and two interceptions in 14 games and four starts.

==== 2012 ====
Gilchrist competed against Antoine Cason and Shareece Wright during training camp for a job as a starting cornerback. Defensive coordinator John Pagano officially named Gilchrist the third cornerback on the depth chart to begin 2012, behind starting cornerbacks Quentin Jammer and Antoine Cason. On November 25, 2012, Gilchrist was placed at free safety in the fourth quarter after Eric Weddle exited the game with a concussion. In Week 13, Gilchrist started at strong safety after Atari Bigby and Darrell Stuckey were inactive due to injuries. He collected a season-high eight combined tackles (seven solo) in the Chargers' 20–13 loss to the Cincinnati Bengals. The following week, Gilchrist earned his second start at safety and recorded five combined tackles and made his first career sack on Ben Roethlisberger during a 34–24 victory at the Pittsburgh Steelers in Week 14. He completed the 2012 season with 59 combined tackles (48 solo), two pass deflections, and a sack in 16 games and four starts.

==== 2013 ====
On January 1, 2013, the San Diego Chargers fired general manager A.J. Smith and head coach Norv Turner after the team compiled a 7–9 record in 2012. On May 5, 2013, it was reported that Gilchrist would attempt to move to strong safety during training camp after the Chargers released Atari Bigby. He competed for the job at strong safety against Darrell Stuckey, Brandon Taylor, Sean Cattouse, and Jahleel Addae. The San Diego Chargers' new head coach, Mike McCoy, named Gilchrist the starting strong safety to begin the 2013 regular season, alongside free safety Eric Weddle.

On December 8, 2013, Gilchrist collected a season-high eight combined tackles during a 37–14 win against the New York Giants in Week 14. The following week, he recorded six solo tackles, a pass deflection, and made the second sack of his career on Peyton Manning during the Chargers' 30–27 victory at the Denver Broncos in Week 15. He started all 16 games and recorded a total of 77 combined tackles (59 solo), five pass deflections, two interceptions, a forced fumble, and a sack.

The San Diego Chargers finished third in the AFC West with a 9–7 record and earned a wildcard berth. On January 5, 2014, Gilchrist started in his first career playoff game and recorded five combined tackles during a 27–10 victory at the Cincinnati Bengals in the AFC Wildcard Game. On January 12, 2014, he collected seven solo tackles as the Chargers lost 24–10 in the AFC Divisional Round at the Denver Broncos. Pro Football Focus ranked Gilchrist the 20th best safety in 2013.

==== 2014 ====
Gilchrist entered training camp slated as the starting strong safety, but competed against Jahleel Addae to retain the role. Head coach Mike McCoy named Gilchrist the starting strong safety to begin the regular season, opposite free safety Eric Weddle. On November 23, 2014, Gilchrist recorded seven combined tackles, a pass deflection, and an interception during a 27–24 win against the St. Louis Rams in Week 14. He intercepted a pass attempt by Shaun Hill, that was intended for wide receiver Kenny Britt, and sealed the Chargers' victory at the end of the fourth quarter. In Week 16, he collected a season-high eight combined tackles in the Chargers' 23–14 loss against the New England Patriots. He completed the season with 76 combined tackles (59 solo), five passes defensed, two forced fumbles, an interception, and a sack in 16 games and 16 starts. Gilchrist sustained a shoulder injury during the end of the season. Pro Football Focus ranked Gilchrist the 72nd best overall safety among all qualifying safeties in 2014.

=== New York Jets ===
==== 2015 ====
Gilchrist became an unrestricted free agent in 2015 and underwent arthroscopic surgery to repair his injured shoulder. He reportedly received interest from a few teams, including the New York Jets, Washington Redskins, and Philadelphia Eagles.

On March 12, 2015, the New York Jets signed Gilchrist to a four-year, $22 million contract with $5 million guaranteed and a signing bonus of $2.50 million.

Head coach Todd Bowles officially named Gilchrist the starting strong safety to start the regular season, alongside free safety Calvin Pryor. On September 21, 2015, Gilchrist made four combined tackles, a pass deflection, and recorded his first interception as a member of the New York Jets during a 20–7 win at the Indianapolis Colts in Week 2. He intercepted a pass by quarterback Andrew Luck, that was intended for wide receiver Andre Johnson, in the fourth quarter. In Week 7, he collected a season-high nine combined tackles during a 30–23 loss at the New England Patriots. On December 27, 2015, Gilchrist recorded a season-high eight solo tackles in the Jets' 26–20 win against the New England Patriots. He finished the 2015 season with 82 combined tackles (60 solo), seven passes defensed, and three interceptions in 16 games and 16 starts.

==== 2016 ====
Defensive coordinator Kacy Rodgers opted to move Gilchrist to free safety and Calvin Pryor to strong safety. Head coach Todd Bowles named Gilchrist the starting free safety to begin the 2016 regular season.

On October 30, 2016, Gilchrist recorded seven combined tackles, a pass deflection, and an interception during a 31–28 win at the Cleveland Browns in Week 8. In Week 13, he collected a season-high eight combined tackles during a 41–10 loss against the Indianapolis Colts. The following week, he made five solo tackles before tearing his patellar tendon in the third quarter of a 23–17 victory at the San Francisco 49ers. On December 13, 2016, the New York Jets placed Gilchrist on injured reserve for the last three games of the regular season. His injury ended his streak of 83 consecutive games and 62 consecutive starts. He finished the 2016 season with 55 combined tackles (39 solo), three pass deflections, two forced fumbles, and an interception in 13 games and 13 starts. On May 4, 2017, the New York Jets released Gilrchrist a week after they drafted safeties Jamal Adams and Marcus Maye during the 2017 NFL draft.

=== Houston Texans ===
On July 31, 2017, the Houston Texans signed Gilchrist to a one-year, $3 million contract with $1.80 million guaranteed and a signing bonus of $800,000.

Throughout training camp, he competed to be the starting strong safety against Corey Moore, Lonnie Ballentine, and Kurtis Drummond. Head coach Bill O'Brien named Gilchrist the backup free safety, behind Andre Hal, to begin the regular season. In Week 4, Gilchrist surpassed Corey Moore on the depth chart and earned his first start of the season as the strong safety after the secondary gave up five passing touchdowns the previous week. He recorded two solo tackles, a pass deflection, and intercepted a pass by Marcus Mariota during a 57–14 victory against the Tennessee Titans. On October 4, 2017, Gilchrist was officially named starting strong safety for the remainder of the season. The following week, Gilchrist collected a season-high nine combined tackles during a 42–34 loss against the Kansas City Chiefs in Week 5. He finished the season with 56 combined tackles (45 solo), six pass deflections, an interception, a forced fumble, and a sack in 16 games and 13 starts. Pro Football Focus gave Gilchrist an overall grade of 77.2, which ranked him 51st among all qualified safeties in 2017.

=== Oakland Raiders ===
On March 15, 2018, the Oakland Raiders signed Gilchrist to a one-year, $4 million contract with $3.85 million guaranteed and a signing bonus of $1.85 million. In week 10 against the Los Angeles Chargers, Gilchrist made his first interception of the season on quarterback Philip Rivers in a 20–6 loss.

=== Detroit Lions ===
On October 24, 2019, Gilchrist signed with the Detroit Lions, but was released two days later.

=== Jacksonville Jaguars ===
On November 26, 2019, Gilchrist was signed by the Jacksonville Jaguars. He was released on December 18, 2019.

=== Baltimore Ravens ===
On September 30, 2020, Gilchrist was signed to the Baltimore Ravens' practice squad. He was elevated to the active roster on October 10 and October 17 for the team's weeks 5 and 6 games against the Cincinnati Bengals and Philadelphia Eagles, and reverted to the practice squad after each game. He was released on October 27.

== NFL career statistics ==
Legend
**Bold**	Career high

=== Regular season ===
Year	Team	Games		Tackles					Interceptions					Fumbles			
Year	Team	GP	GS	Cmb	Solo	Ast	Sck	TFL	Int	Yds	TD	Lng	PD	FF	FR	Yds	TD
2011	SDG	14	4	34	27	7	0.0	0	2	22	0	21	4	0	**1**	**40**	0
2012	SDG	**16**	4	59	48	11	**1.0**	5	0	0	0	0	3	0	0	0	0
2013	SDG	**16**	**16**	77	59	18	**1.0**	3	2	**43**	0	26	5	1	**1**	0	0
2014	SDG	**16**	**16**	76	59	17	**1.0**	**7**	1	4	0	4	5	**2**	0	0	0
2015	NYJ	**16**	**16**	**82**	**60**	**22**	0.0	0	**3**	31	0	**31**	**7**	0	0	0	0
2016	NYJ	13	13	55	39	16	0.0	1	2	25	0	25	3	1	0	0	0
2017	HOU	**16**	13	56	45	11	**1.0**	1	1	17	0	17	6	1	0	0	0
2018	OAK	**16**	**16**	58	40	18	0.0	0	**3**	2	0	2	6	0	0	0	0
2019	JAX	3	0	2	2	0	0.0	0	0	0	0	0	0	0	0	0	0
2020	BAL	2	0	3	3	0	0.0	0	0	0	0	0	0	0	0	0	0
		128	98	502	382	120	4.0	17	14	144	0	31	39	5	2	40	0

=== Playoffs ===
Year	Team	Games		Tackles					Interceptions					Fumbles			
Year	Team	GP	GS	Cmb	Solo	Ast	Sck	TFL	Int	Yds	TD	Lng	PD	FF	FR	Yds	TD
2013	SDG	**2**	**2**	**12**	**10**	**2**	0.0	0	0	0	0	0	0	0	0	0	0
		2	2	12	10	2	0.0	0	0	0	0	0	0	0	0	0	0

== Personal life ==
Gilchrist had toughness and discipline instilled at home at an early age from his father, Ronny, a retired United States Marine. Ronny played sports and boxed in the service. He had Marcus doing push-ups and sit-ups at an early age, 200 a day when he started playing youth sports, and more as he got older. Marcus' mother, LaJeune, was also the daughter of a coach.
