= Adrian Phillips =

American football player (born 1992)

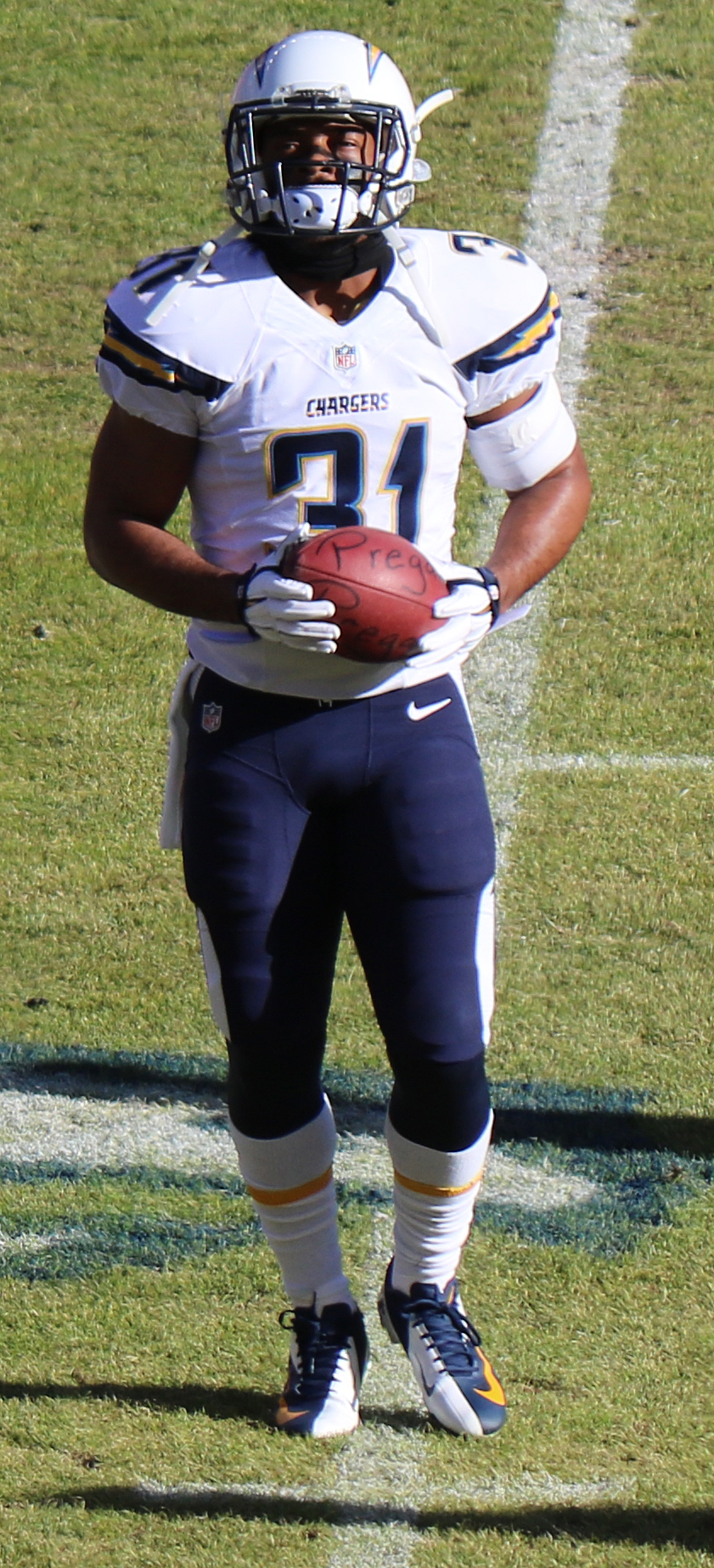
- Phillips with the San Diego Chargers in 2015

No. 27, 31, 21
- Positions: Safety, special teamer

Personal information
- Born: March 28, 1992 (age 34); Garland, Texas, U.S.
- Listed height: 5 ft 11 in (1.80 m)
- Listed weight: 208 lb (94 kg)

Career information
- High school: Garland
- College: Texas (2010–2013)
- NFL draft: 2014: undrafted

Career history
- San Diego / Los Angeles Chargers (2014–2019); New England Patriots (2020–2023)

Awards and highlights
- First-team All-Pro (2018); Pro Bowl (2018)

Career NFL statistics
- Total tackles: 535
- Sacks: 1
- Forced fumbles: 3
- Pass deflections: 34
- Interceptions: 11
- Defensive touchdowns: 1
- Stats at Pro Football Reference

Adrian Phillips (born March 28, 1992) is an American former professional football safety who played in the National Football League (NFL). He played college football for the Texas Longhorns and joined the San Diego Chargers as an undrafted free agent in 2014. During the 2018 season, he earned Pro Bowl and first-team All-Pro honors as a special teamer. Phillips joined the New England Patriots in 2020.

== Early life ==
Phillips played high school football at Garland High School in Garland, Texas. Phillips was an all-state, all-area and two-time first-team all-district selection while playing offense and defense for the Owls. He was a member of ESPNU's top 150 national prospects, ranked as the 14th-best athlete by ESPNU and 25th-best athlete by Rivals. He recorded 72 receptions for 1,307 yards and 14 TDs, 1,111 rushing yards, 14 rushing TDs, 949 passing yards, five passing touchdowns, 87 tackles, a forced fumble, and three interceptions.

== College career ==
Phillips played for the Texas Longhorns from 2010 to 2013. He played in 50 games, starting 28. He was a 2013 honorable mention All-Big 12 coaches choice. Phillips had 206 career tackles and was a team captain in the 2013 season.

== Professional career ==
Pre-draft measurables
Height	Weight	Arm length	Hand span	40-yard dash	10-yard split	20-yard split	20-yard shuttle	Three-cone drill	Vertical jump	Broad jump	Bench press
5 ft 9 7/8 in (1.77 m)	202 lb (92 kg)	31 1/8 in (0.79 m)	8 3/8 in (0.21 m)	4.58 s	1.58 s	2.70 s	4.29 s	7.10 s	35.5 in (0.90 m)	9 ft 7 in (2.92 m)	13 reps
All values from Texas' Pro Day

=== San Diego / Los Angeles Chargers ===
==== 2014 season ====
On June 16, 2014, the San Diego Chargers signed Phillips after he went undrafted in the 2014 NFL draft. On August 31, 2014, the San Diego Chargers waived Phillips. After clearing waivers, he was signed to their practice squad. On September 23, 2014, Phillips was waived from the Chargers' practice squad. On September 29, 2014, the San Diego Chargers' re-signed Phillips to their practice squad. On October 1, 2014, Phillips was released from the Chargers' practice squad, but he was re-signed to the practice squad on October 7, 2014. On November 1, 2014, the San Diego Chargers promoted Phillips to the active roster. On November 2, 2014, Phillips made his professional regular season debut and recorded one tackle during a 37–0 loss at the Miami Dolphins in Week 9. On November 3, 2014, the San Diego Chargers released Phillips, but re-signed him to their practice squad the following day. On November 29, 2014, the San Diego Chargers released Phillips and re-signed him to their practice squad on December 2, 2014. He finished his rookie campaign with one tackle and appeared in three games.

==== 2015 season ====
Phillips entered training camp slated as a backup safety and competed for a roster spot against Gordon Hill and Johnny Lowdermilk. On September 5, 2015, the San Diego Chargers released Phillips, but subsequently signed him to their practice squad the following day. On October 12, 2015, the San Diego Chargers released Phillips from their practice squad. On October 14, 2015, the Chargers re-signed him to their practice squad. On October 20, 2015, the San Diego Chargers signed him to their active roster.

==== 2016 season ====
Throughout training camp, Phillips competed for roster spot as a backup safety against Dexter McCoil, Darrell Stuckey, and Adrian MacDonald. Head coach Mike McCoy named Phillips the backup strong safety to begin the regular season, behind Jahleel Addae.

Phillips was inactive as a healthy scratch for the first two games (Weeks 1–2). On October 2, 2016, Phillips recorded three combined tackles, a pass deflection, and made his first career interception during a 35–34 loss against the New Orleans Saints. Phillips intercepted a pass attempt by Drew Brees, that was originally intended for wide receiver Michael Thomas, during the fourth quarter. In Week 10, Phillips recorded a season-high seven combined tackles (six solo) during a 31–24 loss against the Dolphins. He finished the 2016 NFL season 38 combined tackles (25 solo), three pass deflections, and one interception in 14 games and five starts.

==== 2017 season ====
On September 11, 2017, in the season opener against the Denver Broncos on Monday Night Football, Phillips had an interception off of quarterback Trevor Siemian that helped set up a scoring drive for the Chargers. He played in 15 games with four starts as the No. 3 safety behind Jahleel Addae and Tre Boston.

==== 2018 season ====
On March 14, 2018, Phillips re-signed with the Chargers. He played in 16 games with seven starts, recording a career-high 94 combined tackles, nine passes defensed, one interception, and a forced fumble. He was named to his first Pro Bowl and was named first-team All-Pro, both as a special teamer.

==== 2019 season ====
On March 15, 2019, Phillips re-signed with the Chargers. He entered the season as a starting safety following an injury to Derwin James. Phillips suffered a broken arm in Week 2 and was placed on injured reserve on September 17. He was designated for return from injured reserve on November 14, and began practicing with the team again. Phillips was activated on November 30.

=== New England Patriots ===
On March 21, 2020, the New England Patriots signed Phillips to a two-year, $6 million contract that includes $3 million guaranteed and a signing bonus of $1.50 million.

Phillips made his debut with the Patriots in Week 1 against the Miami Dolphins. During the game, Phillips intercepted a pass thrown by Ryan Fitzpatrick in the 21–11 win. In Week 15 against the Dolphins, Phillips recorded his first career sack on Tua Tagovailoa during the 22–12 loss.

In Week 8 of the 2021 season, Phillips had three tackles and two interceptions, including a 26-yard pick-six, in a 27–24 win over his former team, the Los Angeles Chargers, earning AFC Defensive Player of the Week. On January 1, 2022, Phillips signed a three-year contract extension with the Patriots.

Phillips was released by the Patriots on February 19, 2024.

== NFL career statistics ==
Legend
**Bold**	Career high

=== Regular season ===
Year	Team	Games		Tackles					Interceptions					Fumbles			
Year	Team	GP	GS	Cmb	Solo	Ast	Sck	TFL	Int	Yds	TD	Lng	PD	FF	FR	Yds	TD
2014	SDG	3	0	1	0	1	0.0	0	0	0	0	0	0	0	0	0	0
2015	SDG	9	2	19	12	7	0.0	1	1	**39**	0	**39**	1	0	0	0	0
2016	SDG	14	6	38	25	13	0.0	1	1	22	0	22	3	0	0	0	0
2017	LAC	15	4	63	50	13	0.0	2	2	13	0	9	5	**1**	0	0	0
2018	LAC	16	7	94	65	29	0.0	4	1	0	0	0	**9**	**1**	0	0	0
2019	LAC	7	5	36	23	13	0.0	1	0	0	0	0	0	0	0	0	0
2020	NWE	16	**16**	**109**	**76**	33	**1.0**	**7**	2	5	0	5	4	0	0	0	0
2021	NWE	**17**	13	92	56	**36**	0.0	3	**4**	**39**	**1**	26	**9**	**1**	0	0	0
2022	NWE	**17**	8	66	37	29	0.0	3	0	0	0	0	3	0	0	0	0
2023	NWE	**17**	1	17	10	7	0.0	0	0	0	0	0	0	0	0	0	0
		131	62	535	354	181	1.0	22	11	118	1	39	34	3	0	0	0

=== Playoffs ===
Year	Team	Games		Tackles					Interceptions					Fumbles			
Year	Team	GP	GS	Cmb	Solo	Ast	Sck	TFL	Int	Yds	TD	Lng	PD	FF	FR	Yds	TD
2018	LAC	**2**	**2**	**12**	**5**	**7**	0.0	**1**	**1**	0	0	0	**3**	0	**1**	0	0
2021	NWE	1	0	6	3	3	0.0	0	0	0	0	0	0	0	0	0	0
		3	2	18	8	10	0.0	1	1	0	0	0	3	0	1	0	0
