= 2018 Los Angeles Chargers season =

59th season in franchise history

- Owner: Alex Spanos (until death, October 9); Dean Spanos
- General manager: Tom Telesco
- Head coach: Anthony Lynn
- Offensive coordinator: Ken Whisenhunt
- Defensive coordinator: Gus Bradley
- Home stadium: StubHub Center

Results
- Record: 12–4
- Division place: 2nd AFC West
- Playoffs: Won Wild Card Playoffs (at Ravens) 23–17; Lost Divisional Playoffs (at Patriots) 28–41
- All-Pros: 5: S Derwin James (1st team); DB Desmond King (1st team); ST Adrian Phillips (1st team); DB Derwin James (2nd team); PR Desmond King (2nd team)
- Pro Bowlers: 7: QB Philip Rivers; RB Melvin Gordon; WR Keenan Allen; C Mike Pouncey; DE Melvin Ingram; FS Derwin James; ST Adrian Phillips

The 2018 season was the Los Angeles Chargers' 49th in the National Football League (NFL), their 59th overall, their third in the Greater Los Angeles Area and their second under head coach Anthony Lynn.

Despite a slow 1–2 start, the Chargers improved on their 9–7 record from the previous year with a Week 14 win over the Cincinnati Bengals. They also recorded a 10-win season for the first time since 2009 when they were in San Diego, also their first as a Los Angeles based team since 1960. With a Week 15 win over the Kansas City Chiefs, the Chargers clinched their first playoff berth since 2013 when they were based in San Diego.

The Chargers finished 12–4, tied with the Chiefs for both the AFC West division title and the best record in the AFC. However, the Chiefs won the division and the AFC's No. 1 seed based on record vs. division opponents (5–1 to 4–2), giving the Chargers the Wild Card and the AFC's No. 5 seed. The Chargers defeated the Baltimore Ravens 23–17 in the wild-card round, but lost to the eventual Super Bowl LIII champion New England Patriots 28–41 in the divisional round. The season would prove to be their last where all of their games were played outdoors, as well as their most recent with a playoff win.

== Offseason ==
=== Roster changes ===
==== Signings ====
Position	Player	Acquired from
C	Mike Pouncey	Miami Dolphins
TE	Virgil Green	Denver Broncos
K	Caleb Sturgis	Philadelphia Eagles
P	Donnie Jones	Philadelphia Eagles
QB	Geno Smith	New York Giants

==== Departures ====
Position	Player	Lost to
G	Kenny Wiggins	Detroit Lions
G	Matt Slauson	Indianapolis Colts
S	Tre Boston	Arizona Cardinals
RB	Branden Oliver	Indianapolis Colts

== NFL draft ==
2018 Los Angeles Chargers draft
Round	Pick	Player	Position	College	Notes
1	17	Derwin James *	S	Florida State	
2	48	Uchenna Nwosu	LB	USC	
3	84	Justin Jones	DT	NC State	
4	119	Kyzir White	S	West Virginia	
5	155	Scott Quessenberry	C	UCLA	
6	191	Dylan Cantrell	WR	Texas Tech	
7	251	Justin Jackson	RB	Northwestern	Compensatory pick
Made roster † Pro Football Hall of Fame * Made at least one Pro Bowl during career

Draft trades

- The Chargers traded their seventh-round selection (234th overall) to Buffalo in exchange for quarterback Cardale Jones.
- The Chargers were awarded a seventh-round compensatory pick (251st overall).

== Staff ==
2018 Los Angeles Chargers staff
Front office: Owner/chairman/president – Dean Spanos; Executive vice president – Michael Spanos; CEO/president – business operations – A. G. Spanos; General manager – Tom Telesco; President – football operations – John Spanos; Executive vice president of football administration/player finance – Ed McGuire; Senior executive – Randy Mueller; Director of pro scouting – Dennis Abraham; Senior director of pro personnel – Louis Clark; Director of player personnel – JoJo Wooden; Director of college scouting – Kevin Kelly; Head coaches: Head coach – Anthony Lynn; Assistant head coach/special teams coordinator – George Stewart; Offensive coaches: Offensive coordinator – Ken Whisenhunt; Quarterbacks – Shane Steichen; Running backs – Alfredo Roberts; Wide receivers – Phil McGeoghan; Tight ends – Rip Scherer; Offensive line – Pat Meyer; Assistant offensive line – Mark Ridgley; Offensive quality control – Dan Shamash	Defensive coaches: Defensive coordinator – Gus Bradley; Defensive line – Giff Smith; Assistant defensive line – Eric Henderson; Linebackers – Richard Smith; Defensive backs – Ron Milus; Assistant defensive backs – Chris Harris; Defensive assistant – Marquice Williams; Defensive quality control – Addison Lynch; Special teams coaches: Assistant special teams – Keith Burns; Strength and conditioning: Head strength and conditioning – John Lott; Assistant strength – Jonathan Brooks

== Final roster ==
2018 Los Angeles Chargers roster
Quarterbacks (QB): 17 Philip Rivers; 3 Geno Smith; Running backs (RB): 30 Austin Ekeler; 28 Melvin Gordon; 32 Justin Jackson; 38 Detrez Newsome; 35 Troymaine Pope; 34 Derek Watt FB; Wide receivers (WR): 13 Keenan Allen; 12 Travis Benjamin; 84 Dylan Cantrell; 11 Geremy Davis; 81 Mike Williams; 16 Tyrell Williams; Tight ends (TE): 80 Sean Culkin; 85 Antonio Gates; 88 Virgil Green	Offensive linemen (OL): 66 Dan Feeney G; 77 Forrest Lamp G; 76 Russell Okung T; 53 Mike Pouncey C; 61 Scott Quessenberry C/G; 75 Michael Schofield G; 68 Trent Scott T; 69 Sam Tevi T; 64 Cole Toner G/C; Defensive linemen (DL): 99 Joey Bosa DE; 54 Melvin Ingram DE; 91 Justin Jones DT; 90 Anthony Lanier DE; 95 T. Y. McGill DT; 92 Brandon Mebane DT; 93 Darius Philon DT; 98 Isaac Rochell DE; 71 Damion Square DE/DT	Linebackers (LB): 57 Jatavis Brown OLB; 48 Nick Dzubnar MLB; 51 Kyle Emanuel OLB; 42 Uchenna Nwosu; 50 Hayes Pullard MLB; 56 Kyle Wilson OLB; Defensive backs (DB): 37 Jahleel Addae SS; 43 Michael Davis CB; 36 Brandon Facyson CB; 26 Casey Hayward CB; 33 Derwin James FS; 23 Rayshawn Jenkins SS; 20 Desmond King CB; 31 Adrian Phillips FS; 29 Jeff Richards CB; Special teams (ST): 4 Michael Badgley K; 5 Donnie Jones P; 47 Mike Windt LS	Practice squad: 96 Patrick Afriyie DE; 74 Spencer Drango G; 45 A. J. Hendy FS; 59 Tyrone Holmes OLB; 58 Tre'Von Johnson OLB; 7 Cardale Jones QB; 82 Justice Liggins WR; 83 Vince Mayle TE; 15 Andre Patton WR; 39 Arrion Springs CB; Reserve: 60 Zachary Crabtree T (IR); 86 Hunter Henry TE (PUP); 94 Corey Liuget DT (IR); 52 Denzel Perryman MLB (IR); 87 Austin Roberts TE (IR); 10 Artavis Scott WR (IR); 22 Jason Verrett CB (IR); 27 Jaylen Watkins SS (IR); 44 Kyzir White OLB (IR); 24 Trevor Williams CB (IR); Rookies in italics 53 active, 10 reserve, 10 practice squad

== Preseason ==
Week	Date	Opponent	Result	Record	Venue	Recap
1	August 11	at Arizona Cardinals	L 17–24	0–1	State Farm Stadium	Recap
2	August 18	Seattle Seahawks	W 24–14	1–1	StubHub Center	Recap
3	August 25	New Orleans Saints	L 7–36	1–2	StubHub Center	Recap
4	August 30	at San Francisco 49ers	W 23–21	2–2	Levi's Stadium	Recap

== Regular season ==
=== Schedule ===
On January 11, the NFL announced that the Chargers would play host to the Tennessee Titans in one of the London Games at Wembley Stadium in London, England. It was the Chargers' second appearance in the International Series; the other being 2008. The game occurred during Week 7 (October 21), and was televised in the United States.

The Chargers' regular season schedule was released on April 19.

Week	Date	Opponent	Result	Record	Venue	Recap
1	September 9	**Kansas City Chiefs**	**L** 28–38	0–1	StubHub Center	Recap
2	September 16	at Buffalo Bills	**W** 31–20	1–1	New Era Field	Recap
3	September 23	at Los Angeles Rams	**L** 23–35	1–2	Los Angeles Memorial Coliseum	Recap
4	September 30	San Francisco 49ers	**W** 29–27	2–2	StubHub Center	Recap
5	October 7	**Oakland Raiders**	**W** 26–10	3–2	StubHub Center	Recap
6	October 14	at Cleveland Browns	**W** 38–14	4–2	FirstEnergy Stadium	Recap
7	October 21	Tennessee Titans	**W** 20–19	5–2	(United Kingdom) Wembley Stadium (London)	Recap
8	Bye					
9	November 4	at Seattle Seahawks	**W** 25–17	6–2	CenturyLink Field	Recap
10	November 11	at **Oakland Raiders**	**W** 20–6	7–2	Oakland–Alameda County Coliseum	Recap
11	November 18	**Denver Broncos**	**L** 22–23	7–3	StubHub Center	Recap
12	November 25	Arizona Cardinals	**W** 45–10	8–3	StubHub Center	Recap
13	December 2	at Pittsburgh Steelers	**W** 33–30	9–3	Heinz Field	Recap
14	December 9	Cincinnati Bengals	**W** 26–21	10–3	StubHub Center	Recap
15	December 13	at **Kansas City Chiefs**	**W** 29–28	11–3	Arrowhead Stadium	Recap
16	December 22	Baltimore Ravens	**L** 10–22	11–4	StubHub Center	Recap
17	December 30	at **Denver Broncos**	**W** 23–9	12–4	Broncos Stadium at Mile High	Recap

Note: Intra-division opponents are in bold text.

=== Game summaries ===
==== Week 1: vs. Kansas City Chiefs ====
Week One: Kansas City Chiefs at Los Angeles Chargers – Game summary

Quarter	1	2	3	4	Total
**Chiefs**	14	3	14	7	**38**
Chargers	6	6	0	16	**28**

at StubHub Center, Carson, California

- Date: September 9
- Game time: 1:05 p.m. PDT
- Game weather: 84 °F (29 °C), Sunny
- Game attendance: 25,351
- Referee: Clete Blakeman
- TV announcers (CBS): Ian Eagle, Dan Fouts and Evan Washburn
- Recap, Gamebook

Game information

**First quarter**

- KC – Tyreek Hill 91-yard punt return (Harrison Butker kick), 13:24. Chiefs 7–0.
- LAC – Caleb Sturgis 45-yard field goal, 9:24. Chiefs 7–3. **Drive: 8 plays, 48 yards, 3:43.**
- KC – Tyreek Hill 58-yard pass from Patrick Mahomes (Harrison Butker kick), 6:50. Chiefs 14–3. **Drive: 5 plays, 75 yards, 2:41.**
- LAC – Caleb Sturgis 39-yard field goal, 0:25. Chiefs 14–6. **Drive: 6 plays, 39 yards, 3:41.**

**Second quarter**

- LAC – Austin Ekeler 13-yard pass from Philip Rivers (pass failed), 7:54. Chiefs 14–12. **Drive: 12 plays, 96 yards, 6:11.**
- KC – Harrison Butker 46-yard field goal, 2:04. Chiefs 17–12. **Drive: 11 plays, 47 yards, 5:47.**

**Third quarter**

- KC – De'Anthony Thomas 1-yard pass from Patrick Mahomes (Harrison Butker kick), 9:29. Chiefs 24–12. **Drive: 11 plays, 75 yards, 5:35.**
- KC – Anthony Sherman 36-yard pass from Patrick Mahomes (Harrison Butker kick), 0:55. Chiefs 31–12. **Drive: 6 plays, 86 yards, 3:28.**

**Fourth quarter**

- LAC – Keenan Allen 20-yard pass from Philip Rivers (Philip Rivers-Antonio Gates pass), 12:09. Chiefs 31–20. **Drive: 9 plays, 91 yards, 3:44.**
- KC – Tyreek Hill 1-yard pass from Patrick Mahomes (Harrison Butker kick), 9:47. Chiefs 38–20. **Drive: 3 plays, 2 yards, 0:40.**
- LAC – Tyrell Williams 4-yard pass from Philip Rivers (Melvin Gordon run), 5:08. Chiefs 38–28. **Drive: 10 plays, 75 yards, 4:41.**

**Top passers**

- KC – Patrick Mahomes – 15/27, 256 yards, 4 TD
- LAC – Philip Rivers – 34/51, 424 yards, 3 TD, INT

**Top rushers**

- KC – Kareem Hunt – 16 rushes, 49 yards
- LAC – Melvin Gordon – 15 rushes, 64 yards

**Top receivers**

- KC – Tyreek Hill – 7 receptions, 169 yards, 2 TD
- LAC – Keenan Allen – 8 receptions, 108 yards, TD

==== Week 2: at Buffalo Bills ====
Week Two: Los Angeles Chargers at Buffalo Bills – Game summary

Quarter	1	2	3	4	Total
**Chargers**	14	14	0	3	**31**
Bills	0	6	7	7	**20**

at New Era Field, Orchard Park, New York

- Date: September 16
- Game time: 1:00 p.m. EDT/10:00 a.m. PDT
- Game weather: 83 °F (28 °C), fair
- Game attendance: 69,187
- Referee: Clay Martin
- TV announcers (CBS): Tom McCarthy and Steve Beuerlein
- Recap, Gamebook

Game information

**First quarter**

- LAC – Mike Williams 10-yard pass from Philip Rivers (Caleb Sturgis kick), 9:26. Chargers 7–0. **Drive: 3 plays, 38 yards, 1:27.**
- LAC – Melvin Gordon 20-yard run (Caleb Sturgis kick), 4:18. Chargers 14–0. **Drive: 6 plays, 61 yards, 3:24.**

**Second quarter**

- BUF – Stephen Hauschka 43-yard field goal, 13:38. Chargers 14–3. **Drive: 12 plays, 51 yards, 5:40.**
- LAC – Melvin Gordon 9-yard pass from Philip Rivers (Caleb Sturgis kick), 10:43. Chargers 21–3. **Drive: 5 plays, 75 yards, 2:55.**
- LAC – Melvin Gordon 2-yard pass from Philip Rivers (Caleb Sturgis kick), 1:55. Chargers 28–3. **Drive: 12 plays, 81 yards, 6:46.**
- BUF – Stephen Hauschka 40-yard field goal, 0:47. Chargers 28–6. **Drive: 6 plays, 52 yards, 1:08.**

**Third quarter**

- BUF – Chris Ivory 1-yard run (Stephen Hauschka kick), 11:06. Chargers 28–13. **Drive: 7 plays, 75 yards, 3:54.**

**Fourth quarter**

- LAC – Caleb Sturgis 24-yard field goal, 3:50. Chargers 31–13. **Drive: 7 plays, 11 yards, 3:10.**
- BUF – Kelvin Benjamin 3-yard pass from Josh Allen (Stephen Hauschka kick), 0:38. Chargers 31–20. **Drive: 12 plays, 75 yards, 3:12.**

**Top passers**

- LAC – Philip Rivers – 23/27, 256 yards, 3 TD
- BUF – Josh Allen – 18/33, 245 yards, 1 TD, 2 INT

**Top rushers**

- LAC – Austin Ekeler – 11 carries, 77 yards
- BUF – LeSean McCoy – 9 carries, 39 yards

**Top receivers**

- LAC – Keenan Allen – 6 receptions, 67 yards
- BUF – Zay Jones – 2 receptions, 63 yards

==== Week 3: at Los Angeles Rams ====
Week Three: Los Angeles Chargers at Los Angeles Rams – Game summary

Quarter	1	2	3	4	Total
Chargers	6	7	7	3	**23**
**Rams**	14	7	14	0	**35**

at Los Angeles Memorial Coliseum, Los Angeles, California

- Date: September 23
- Game time: 1:05 p.m. PDT
- Game weather: 80 °F (27 °C), sunny
- Game attendance: 68,947
- Referee: John Hussey
- TV announcers (CBS): Ian Eagle, Dan Fouts and Evan Washburn
- Recap, Gamebook

Game information

**First quarter**

- LAR – Todd Gurley 1-yard run (Sam Ficken kick), 6:14. Rams 7–0. **Drive: 11 plays, 80 yards, 5:50.**
- LAC – Mike Williams 42-yard pass from Philip Rivers (kick failed), 4:42. Rams 7–6. **Drive: 3 plays, 60 yards, 1:32.**
- LAR – Robert Woods 3-yard pass from Jared Goff (Sam Ficken kick), 0:51. Rams 14–6. **Drive: 7 plays, 75 yards, 3:31.**

**Second quarter**

- LAR – Blake Countess blocked punt recovery in end zone (Sam Ficken kick), 7:44. Rams 21–6.
- LAC – Melvin Gordon 11-yard run (Caleb Sturgis kick), 3:12. Rams 21–13. **Drive: 10 plays, 75 yards, 4:32.**

**Third quarter**

- LAR – Cooper Kupp 53-yard pass from Jared Goff (Sam Ficken kick), 12:38. Rams 28–13. **Drive: 3 plays, 55 yards, 0:51.**
- LAC – Mike Williams 20-yard pass from Philip Rivers (Caleb Sturgis kick), 8:18. Rams 28–20. **Drive: 8 plays, 75 yards, 4:20.**
- LAR – Robert Woods 6-yard pass from Jared Goff (Sam Ficken kick), 3:19. Rams 35–20. **Drive: 11 plays, 77 yards, 4:59.**

**Fourth quarter**

- LAC – Caleb Sturgis 26-yard field goal, 11:49. Rams 35–23. **Drive: 11 plays, 58 yards, 6:30.**

**Top passers**

- LAC – Philip Rivers – 18/30, 226 yards, 2 TD
- LAR – Jared Goff – 29/36, 354 yards, 3 TD, 1 INT

**Top rushers**

- LAC – Melvin Gordon – 15 carries, 80 yards, 1 TD
- LAR – Todd Gurley – 23 carries, 105 yards, 1 TD

**Top receivers**

- LAC – Mike Williams – 4 receptions, 81 yards, 2 TD
- LAR – Robert Woods – 10 receptions, 104 yards, 2 TD

==== Week 4: vs. San Francisco 49ers ====
Week Four: San Francisco 49ers at Los Angeles Chargers – Game summary

Quarter	1	2	3	4	Total
49ers	14	3	7	3	**27**
**Chargers**	6	11	9	3	**29**

at StubHub Center, Carson, California

- Date: September 30
- Game time: 1:25 p.m. PDT
- Game weather: 78 °F (26 °C), sunny
- Game attendance: 25,397
- Referee: Ronald Torbert
- TV announcers (CBS): Andrew Catalon and James Lofton
- Recap, Gamebook

Game information

**First quarter**

- SF – Antone Exum 32-yard interception return (Robbie Gould kick), 14:03. 49ers 7–0.
- SF – Kendrick Bourne 2-yard pass from C. J. Beathard (Robbie Gould kick), 3:53. 49ers 14–0. **Drive: 6 plays, 56 yards, 3:08.**
- LAC – Antonio Gates 5-yard pass from Philip Rivers (kick failed), 0:43. 49ers 14–6. **Drive: 7 plays, 75 yards, 3:10.**

**Second quarter**

- SF – Robbie Gould 21-yard field goal, 4:59. 49ers 17–6. **Drive: 21 plays, 72 yards, 10:44.**
- LAC – Austin Ekeler 22-yard pass from Philip Rivers (Philip Rivers-Melvin Gordon pass), 0:47. 49ers 17–14. **Drive: 9 plays, 75 yards, 4:12.**
- LAC – Caleb Sturgis 48-yard field goal, 0:00. Tied 17–17. **Drive: 3 plays, 2 yards, 0:13.**

**Third quarter**

- LAC – Melvin Gordon 6-yard pass from Philip Rivers (kick failed), 10:35. Chargers 23–17. **Drive: 6 plays, 51 yards, 2:48.**
- LAC – Caleb Sturgis 25-yard field goal, 7:44. Chargers 26–17. **Drive: 4 plays, 5 yards, 0:58.**
- SF – George Kittle 82-yard pass from C. J. Beathard (Robbie Gould kick), 2:50. Chargers 26–24. **Drive: 2 plays, 84 yards, 0:47.**

**Fourth quarter**

- SF – Robbie Gould 33-yard field goal, 12:39. 49ers 27–26. **Drive: 9 plays, 49 yards, 3:28.**
- LAC – Caleb Sturgis 21-yard field goal, 7:41. Chargers 29–27. **Drive: 9 plays, 72 yards, 4:58.**

**Top passers**

- SF – C. J. Beathard – 23/37, 298 yards, 2 TD, 2 INT
- LAC – Philip Rivers – 25/39, 250 yards, 3 TD, 1 INT

**Top rushers**

- SF – Matt Breida – 9 carries, 39 yards
- LAC – Melvin Gordon – 15 carries, 104 yards

**Top receivers**

- SF – George Kittle – 6 receptions, 125 yards, 1 TD
- LAC – Keenan Allen – 7 receptions, 63 yards

Philip Rivers passed John Elway for eighth-most passing yards in NFL history.

==== Week 5: vs. Oakland Raiders ====
Week Five: Oakland Raiders at Los Angeles Chargers – Game summary

Quarter	1	2	3	4	Total
Raiders	0	3	0	7	**10**
**Chargers**	3	14	3	6	**26**

at StubHub Center, Carson, California

- Date: October 7
- Game time: 1:05 p.m. PDT
- Game weather: 75 °F (24 °C), sunny
- Game attendance: 25,362
- Referee: Alex Kemp
- TV announcers (CBS): Greg Gumbel, Trent Green, Bruce Arians and Melanie Collins
- Recap, Gamebook

Game information

**First quarter**

- LAC – Caleb Sturgis 49-yard field goal, 11:08. Chargers 3–0. **Drive: 7 plays, 37 yards, 3:52.**

**Second quarter**

- OAK – Matt McCrane 24-yard field goal, 13:23. Tied 3–3. **Drive: 10 plays, 77 yards, 5:06.**
- LAC – Austin Ekeler 44-yard pass from Philip Rivers (Caleb Sturgis kick), 4:04. Chargers 10–3. **Drive: 4 plays, 55 yards, 2:04.**
- LAC – Melvin Gordon 1-yard run (Caleb Sturgis kick), 1:39. Chargers 17–3. **Drive: 6 plays, 48 yards, 2:15.**

**Third quarter**

- LAC – Caleb Sturgis 30-yard field goal, 6:05. Chargers 20–3. **Drive: 11 plays, 62 yards, 6:12.**

**Fourth quarter**

- LAC – Virgil Green 13-yard pass from Philip Rivers (kick failed), 9:42. Chargers 26–3. **Drive: 8 plays, 69 yards, 6:23.**
- OAK – Jordy Nelson 1-yard pass from Derek Carr (Matt McCrane kick), 5:11. Chargers 26–10. **Drive: 9 plays, 74 yards, 4:31.**

**Top passers**

- OAK – Derek Carr – 24/33, 268 yards, 1 TD, 1 INT
- LAC – Philip Rivers – 22/27, 339 yards, 2 TD

**Top rushers**

- OAK – Marshawn Lynch – 9 carries, 31 yards
- LAC – Melvin Gordon – 19 carries, 58 yards, 1 TD

**Top receivers**

- OAK – Jalen Richard – 6 receptions, 53 yards
- LAC – Keenan Allen – 8 receptions, 90 yards

==== Week 6: at Cleveland Browns ====
Week Six: Los Angeles Chargers at Cleveland Browns – Game summary

Quarter	1	2	3	4	Total
**Chargers**	7	14	14	3	**38**
Browns	0	6	0	8	**14**

at FirstEnergy Stadium, Cleveland, Ohio

- Date: October 14
- Game time: 10:00 a.m. PDT/1:00 p.m. EDT
- Game weather: 51 °F (11 °C), sunny
- Game attendance: 67,431
- Referee: Brad Allen
- TV announcers (CBS): Spero Dedes and Adam Archuleta
- Recap, Gamebook

Game information

**First quarter**

- LAC – Melvin Gordon 4-yard run (Michael Badgley kick), 10:14. Chargers 7–0. **Drive: 5 plays, 57 yards, 2:32.**

**Second quarter**

- CLE – Greg Joseph 33-yard field goal, 12:47. Chargers 7–3. **Drive: 7 plays, 18 yards, 2:13.**
- LAC – Tyrell Williams 45-yard pass from Philip Rivers (Michael Badgley kick), 6:34. Chargers 14–3. **Drive: 2 plays, 89 yards, 1:12.**
- LAC – Tyrell Williams 29-yard pass from Philip Rivers (Michael Badgley kick), 0:51. Chargers 21–3. **Drive: 6 plays, 77 yards, 1:22.**
- CLE – Greg Joseph 28-yard field goal, 0:00. Chargers 21–6. **Drive: 8 plays, 59 yards, 0:51.**

**Third quarter**

- LAC – Melvin Gordon 10-yard run (Michael Badgley kick), 11:49. Chargers 28–6. **Drive: 1 plays, 10 yards, 0:05.**
- LAC – Melvin Gordon 11-yard run (Michael Badgley kick), 3:12. Chargers 35–6. **Drive: 11 plays, 81 yards, 7:10.**

**Fourth quarter**

- CLE – David Njoku 1-yard pass from Baker Mayfield (Baker Mayfield-Antonio Callaway pass), 12:26. Chargers 35–14. **Drive: 7 plays, 42 yards, 1:50.**
- LAC – Michael Badgley 44-yard field goal, 4:15. Chargers 38–14. **Drive: 5 plays, 9 yards, 2:37.**

**Top passers**

- LAC – Philip Rivers – 11/20, 207 yards, 2 TD, 1 INT
- CLE – Baker Mayfield – 22/46, 238 yards, 1 TD, 2 INT

**Top rushers**

- LAC – Melvin Gordon – 18 carries, 132 yards, 3 TD
- CLE – Duke Johnson – 2 carries, 36 yards

**Top receivers**

- LAC – Keenan Allen – 4 receptions, 62 yards
- CLE – David Njoku – 7 receptions, 55 yards, 1 TD

==== Week 7: vs. Tennessee Titans ====
NFL London Games

Week Seven: Tennessee Titans at Los Angeles Chargers – Game summary

Quarter	1	2	3	4	Total
Titans	3	3	7	6	**19**
**Chargers**	10	0	7	3	**20**

at Wembley Stadium, London, England

- Date: October 21
- Game time: 6:30 a.m. PDT/2:30 p.m. BST
- Game weather: 66 °F (19 °C), sunny
- Game attendance: 84,301
- Referee: Walt Coleman
- TV announcers (CBS): Greg Gumbel, Trent Green, Bruce Arians and Melanie Collins
- Recap, Gamebook

Game information

**First quarter**

- TEN – Ryan Succop 28-yard field goal, 9:44. Titans 3–0. **Drive: 11 plays, 55 yards, 5:16.**
- LAC – Tyrell Williams 75-yard pass from Philip Rivers (Michael Badgley kick), 9:35. Chargers 7–3. **Drive: 1 plays, 75 yards, 0:09.**
- LAC – Michael Badgley 29-yard field goal, 1:48. Chargers 10–3. **Drive: 10 plays, 67 yards, 5:07.**

**Second quarter**

- TEN – Ryan Succop 33-yard field goal, 12:51. Chargers 10–6. **Drive: 8 plays, 50 yards, 3:57.**

**Third quarter**

- LAC – Mike Williams 55-yard pass from Philip Rivers (Michael Badgley kick), 13:46. Chargers 17–6. **Drive: 3 plays, 75 yards, 1:14.**
- TEN – Derrick Henry 1-yard run (Ryan Succop kick), 9:43. Chargers 17–13. **Drive: 7 plays, 42 yards, 4:03.**

**Fourth quarter**

- LAC – Michael Badgley 28-yard field goal, 12:29. Chargers 20–13. **Drive: 14 plays, 56 yards, 6:27.**
- TEN – Luke Stocker 1-yard pass from Marcus Mariota (pass failed), 0:31. Chargers 20–19. **Drive: 13 plays, 89 yards, 4:24.**

**Top passers**

- TEN – Marcus Mariota – 24/32, 237 yards, 1 TD, 1 INT
- LAC – Philip Rivers – 19/26, 306 yards, 2 TD

**Top rushers**

- TEN – Dion Lewis – 13 carries, 91 yards
- LAC – Austin Ekeler – 12 carries, 42 yards

**Top receivers**

- TEN – Tajae Sharpe – 7 receptions, 101 yards
- LAC – Keenan Allen – 5 receptions, 72 yards

==== Week 9: at Seattle Seahawks ====
Week Nine: Los Angeles Chargers at Seattle Seahawks – Game summary

Quarter	1	2	3	4	Total
**Chargers**	6	13	0	6	**25**
Seahawks	7	3	0	7	**17**

at CenturyLink Field, Seattle, Washington

- Date: November 4
- Game time: 1:05 p.m. PST
- Game weather: 56 °F (13 °C), sunny
- Game attendance: 68,989
- Referee: Shawn Hochuli
- TV announcers (CBS): Kevin Harlan, Rich Gannon and Steve Tasker
- Recap, Gamebook

Game information

**First quarter**

- SEA – Jaron Brown 10-yard pass from Russell Wilson (Sebastian Janikowski kick), 6:55. Seahawks 7–0. **Drive: 13 plays, 75 yards, 8:05.**
- LAC – Tyrell Williams 12-yard pass from Philip Rivers (kick failed), 0:00. Seahawks 7–6. **Drive: 10 plays, 94 yards, 6:55.**

**Second quarter**

- LAC – Melvin Gordon 34-yard run (pass failed), 11:36. Chargers 12–7. **Drive: 4 plays, 84 yards, 1:04.**
- LAC – Mike Williams 30-yard pass from Philip Rivers (Caleb Sturgis kick), 1:10. Chargers 19–7. **Drive: 5 plays, 65 yards, 0:55.**
- SEA – Sebastian Janikowski 44-yard field goal, 0:00. Chargers 19–10. **Drive: 8 plays, 49 yards, 1:10.**

**Third quarter**

- NO scoring plays.

**Fourth quarter**

- LAC – Desmond King 42-yard interception return (kick failed), 6:44. Chargers 25–10.
- SEA – Nick Vannett 6-yard pass from Russell Wilson (Sebastian Janikowski kick), 1:50. Chargers 25–17. **Drive: 14 plays, 54 yards, 4:54.**

**Top passers**

- LAC – Philip Rivers – 13/26, 228 yards, 2 TD
- SEA – Russell Wilson – 26/39, 235 yards, 2 TD, 1 INT

**Top rushers**

- LAC – Melvin Gordon – 16 carries, 113 yards, 1 TD
- SEA – Mike Davis – 15 carries, 62 yards

**Top receivers**

- LAC – Keenan Allen – 6 receptions, 124 yards
- SEA – Doug Baldwin – 4 receptions, 77 yards

==== Week 10: at Oakland Raiders ====
Week Ten: Los Angeles Chargers at Oakland Raiders – Game summary

Quarter	1	2	3	4	Total
**Chargers**	0	10	7	3	**20**
Raiders	3	0	0	3	**6**

at Oakland–Alameda County Coliseum, Oakland, California

- Date: November 11
- Game time: 1:05 p.m. PST
- Game weather: 69 °F (21 °C), hazy
- Game attendance: 54,750
- Referee: Craig Wrolstad
- TV announcers (Fox): Dick Stockton, Mark Schlereth and Jennifer Hale
- Recap, Gamebook

Game information

**First quarter**

- OAK – Daniel Carlson 46-yard field goal, 2:51. Raiders 3–0. **Drive: 8 plays, 32 yards, 3:34.**

**Second quarter**

- LAC – Michael Badgley 27-yard field goal, 5:47. Tied 3–3. **Drive: 11 plays, 31 yards, 5:23.**
- LAC – Keenan Allen 11-yard pass from Philip Rivers (Michael Badgley kick), 0:24. Chargers 10–3. **Drive: 8 plays, 91 yards, 3:09.**

**Third quarter**

- LAC – Melvin Gordon 66-yard pass from Philip Rivers (Michael Badgley kick), 12:32. Chargers 17–3. **Drive: 4 plays, 77 yards, 2:28.**

**Fourth quarter**

- OAK – Daniel Carlson 30-yard field goal, 14:49. Chargers 17–6. **Drive: 9 plays, 69 yards, 3:04.**
- LAC – Michael Badgley 41-yard field goal, 7:12. Chargers 20–6. **Drive: 12 plays, 57 yards, 7:37.**

**Top passers**

- LAC – Philip Rivers – 18/16, 223 yards, 2 TD, INT
- OAK – Derek Carr – 24/37, 243 yards

**Top rushers**

- LAC – Melvin Gordon – 18 carries, 93 yards
- OAK – Doug Martin – 15 carries, 61 yards

**Top receivers**

- LAC – Melvn Gordon – 5 receptions, 72 yards
- OAK – Jalen Richard – 5 receptions, 52 yards

==== Week 11: vs. Denver Broncos ====
Week Eleven: Denver Broncos at Los Angeles Chargers – Game summary

Quarter	1	2	3	4	Total
**Broncos**	0	7	7	9	**23**
Chargers	6	7	6	3	**22**

at StubHub Center, Carson, California

- Date: November 18
- Game time: 1:05 p.m. PST
- Game weather: 69 °F (21 °C), clear
- Game attendance: 25,462
- Referee: Pete Morelli
- TV announcers (CBS): Ian Eagle, Dan Fouts and Evan Washburn
- Recap, Gamebook

Game information

**First quarter**

- LAC – Michael Badgley 46-yard field goal, 7:00. Chargers 3–0. **Drive: 13 plays, 52 yards, 6:47.**
- LAC – Michael Badgley 45-yard field goal, 0:39. Chargers 6–0. **Drive: 8 plays, 55 yards, 4:04.**

**Second quarter**

- DEN – Phillip Lindsay 41-yard run (Brandon McManus kick), 12:05. Broncos 7–6. **Drive: 7 plays, 70 yards, 3:34.**
- LAC – Keenan Allen 4-yard pass from Philip Rivers (Michael Badgley kick), 2:39. Chargers 13–7. **Drive: 9 plays, 84 yards, 4:14.**

**Third quarter**

- LAC – Antonio Gates 6-yard pass from Philip Rivers (kick failed, wide left), 9:56. Chargers 19–7. **Drive: 9 plays, 75 yards, 5:04.**
- DEN – Royce Freeman 3-yard run (Brandon McManus kick), 2:24. Chargers 19–14. **Drive: 3 plays, 18 yards, 1:21.**

**Fourth quarter**

- DEN – Phillip Lindsay 2-yard run (run failed), 12:17. Broncos 20–19. **Drive: 7 plays, 73 yards, 3:33.**
- LAC – Michael Badgley 30-yard field goal, 6:47. Chargers 22–20. **Drive: 8 plays, 60 yards, 5:30.**
- DEN – Brandon McManus 34-yard field goal, 0:00. Broncos 23–22. **Drive: 7 plays, 76 yards, 1:51.**

**Top passers**

- DEN – Case Keenum – 19/32, 205 yards
- LAC – Philip Rivers – 28/43, 401 yards, 2 TD, 2 INT

**Top rushers**

- DEN – Phillip Lindsay – 11 rushes, 79 yards, 2 TD
- LAC – Melvin Gordon – 18 rushes, 69 yards

**Top receivers**

- DEN – Courtland Sutton – 3 receptions, 78 yards
- LAC – Keenan Allen – 9 receptions, 89 yards

==== Week 12: vs. Arizona Cardinals ====
Week Twelve: Arizona Cardinals at Los Angeles Chargers – Game summary

Quarter	1	2	3	4	Total
Cardinals	10	0	0	0	**10**
**Chargers**	0	28	14	3	**45**

at StubHub Center, Carson, California

- Date: November 25
- Game time: 1:05 p.m. PST
- Game weather: 74 °F (23 °C), partly cloudy
- Game attendance: 25,343
- Referee: Alex Kemp
- TV announcers (Fox): Chris Myers, Daryl Johnston and Laura Okmin
- Recap, Gamebook

Game information

**First quarter**

- ARI – Larry Fitzgerald 25-yard pass from Josh Rosen (Phil Dawson kick), 10:20. Cardinals 7–0. **Drive: 9 plays, 76 yards, 4:40.**
- ARI – Phil Dawson 30-yard field goal, 4:22. Cardinals 10–0. **Drive: 8 plays, 32 yards, 3:47.**

**Second quarter**

- LAC – Mike Williams 9-yard pass from Philip Rivers (Michael Badgley kick), 14:12. Cardinals 10–7. **Drive: 8 plays, 58 yards, 5:10.**
- LAC – Melvin Gordon 28-yard rush (Michael Badgley kick), 6:59. Chargers 14–10. **Drive: 4 plays, 31 yards, 2:35.**
- LAC – Melvin Gordon 5-yard rush (Michael Badgley kick), 4:16. Chargers 21–10. **Drive: 4 plays, 31 yards, 2:35.**
- LAC – Mike Williams 2-yard pass from Philip Rivers (Michael Badgley kick), 0:08. Chargers 28–10. **Drive: 10 plays, 80 yards, 1:37.**

**Third quarter**

- LAC – Keenan Allen 2-yard pass from Philip Rivers (Michael Badgley kick), 8:01. Chargers 35–10. **Drive: 11 plays, 77 yards, 6:59.**
- LAC – Austin Ekeler 2-yard rush (Michael Badgley kick), 0:00. Chargers 42–10. **Drive: 10 plays, 73 yards, 6:04.**

**Fourth quarter**

- LAC – Michael Badgley 31-yard field goal, 3:25. Chargers 45–10. **Drive: 9 plays, 62 yards, 4:58.**

**Top passers**

- ARI – Josh Rosen – 12/19, 105 yards, TD, INT
- LAC – Philip Rivers – 28/29, 259 yards, 3 TD

**Top rushers**

- ARI – David Johnson – 17 carries, 63 yards
- LAC – Melvin Gordon – 10 carries, 61 yards, 2 TD

**Top receivers**

- ARI – Christian Kirk – 4 receptions, 41 yards
- LAC – Keenan Allen – 7 receptions, 72 yards, TD

==== Week 13: at Pittsburgh Steelers ====
Week Thirteen: Los Angeles Chargers at Pittsburgh Steelers – Game summary

Quarter	1	2	3	4	Total
**Chargers**	7	0	8	18	**33**
Steelers	13	10	0	7	**30**

at Heinz Field, Pittsburgh, Pennsylvania

- Date: December 2
- Game time: 5:20 p.m. PST/8:20 p.m. EST
- Game weather: 57 °F (14 °C), clear
- Game attendance: 61,069
- Referee: Bill Vinovich
- TV announcers (NBC): Al Michaels, Cris Collinsworth and Michele Tafoya and Terry McAulay
- Recap, Gamebook

Game information

**First quarter**

- PIT – James Conner 1-yard rush (Chris Boswell kick), 9:20. Steelers 7–0. **Drive: 4 plays, 58 yards, 1:59.**
- PIT – James Conner 1-yard rush (kick failed), 4:41. Steelers 13–0. **Drive: 6 plays, 48 yards, 3:01.**
- LAC – Travis Benjamin 46-yard pass from Philip Rivers (Michael Badgley kick), 1:04. Steelers 13–7. **Drive: 6 plays, 75 yards, 3:37.**

**Second quarter**

- PIT – Chris Boswell 48-yard field goal, 2:40. Steelers 16–7. **Drive: 4 plays, 4 yards, 0:59.**
- PIT – Antonio Brown 28-yard pass from Ben Roethlisberger (Chris Boswell kick), 0:17. Steelers 23–7. **Drive: 6 plays, 91 yards, 1:18.**

**Third quarter**

- LAC – Keenan Allen 10-yard pass from Philip Rivers (Philip Rivers-Antonio Gates pass), 1:43. Steelers 23–15. **Drive: 13 plays, 88 yards, 8:07.**

**Fourth quarter**

- LAC – Desmond King 73-yard punt return (Philip Rivers-Keenan Allen pass), 12:52. Tied 23–23.
- LAC – Justin Jackson 18-yard rush (Michael Badgley kick), 8:09. Chargers 30–23. **Drive: 7 plays, 79 yards, 3:51.**
- PIT – Jaylen Samuels 10-yard pass from Ben Roethlisberger (Chris Boswell kick), 4:10. Tied 30–30. **Drive: 12 plays, 78 yards, 3:59.**
- LAC – Michael Badgley 29-yard field goal, 0:00. Chargers 33–30. **Drive: 11 plays, 64 yards, 4:10.**

**Top passers**

- LAC – Philip Rivers – 26/36, 299 yards, 2 TD
- PIT – Ben Roethlisberger – 29/45, 281 yards, 2 TD, 1 INT

**Top rushers**

- LAC – Justin Jackson – 8 carries, 63 yards, 1 TD
- PIT – James Conner – 15 carries, 60 yards, 2 TD

**Top receivers**

- LAC – Keenan Allen – 14 receptions, 148 yards, 1 TD
- PIT – Antonio Brown – 10 receptions, 154 yards, 1 TD

==== Week 14: vs. Cincinnati Bengals ====
Week Fourteen: Cincinnati Bengals at Los Angeles Chargers – Game summary

Quarter	1	2	3	4	Total
Bengals	3	9	0	9	**21**
**Chargers**	7	10	3	6	**26**

at StubHub Center, Carson, California

- Date: December 9
- Game time: 1:05 p.m. PST
- Game weather: 71 °F (22 °C), clear
- Game attendance: 25,358
- Referee: John Hussey
- TV announcers (CBS): Greg Gumbel, Trent Green, Bruce Arians and Melanie Collins
- Recap, Gamebook

Game information

**First quarter**

- LAC – Keenan Allen 14-yard pass from Philip Rivers (Michael Badgley kick), 11:39. Chargers 7–0. **Drive: 6 plays, 75 yards, 3:21.**
- CIN – Randy Bullock 47-yard field goal, 6:23. Chargers 7–3. **Drive: 9 plays, 51 yards, 5:16.**

**Second quarter**

- LAC – Austin Ekeler 5-yard rush (Michael Badgley kick), 14:51. Chargers 14–3. **Drive: 13 plays, 75 yards, 6:32.**
- CIN – Randy Bullock 23-yard field goal, 5:01. Chargers 14–6. **Drive: 10 plays, 41 yards, 5:21.**
- CIN – John Ross 6-yard pass from Jeff Driskel (pass failed), 0:20. Chargers 14–12. **Drive: 5 plays, 35 yards, 1:15.**
- LAC – Michael Badgley 59-yard field goal, 0:00. Chargers 17–12. **Drive: 3 plays, 27 yards, 0:20.**

**Third quarter**

- LAC – Michael Badgley 31-yard field goal, 7:38. Chargers 20–12. **Drive: 11 plays, 22 yards, 5:06.**

**Fourth quarter**

- CIN – Randy Bullock 46-yard field goal, 12:12. Chargers 20–15. **Drive: 8 plays, 33 yards, 3:48.**
- LAC – Michael Badgley 32-yard field goal, 7:45. Chargers 23–15. **Drive: 8 plays, 61 yards, 4:27.**
- CIN – Joe Mixon 1-yard rush (pass failed), 1:50. Chargers 23–21. **Drive: 11 plays, 79 yards, 5:55.**
- LAC – Michael Badgley 45-yard field goal, 0:49. Chargers 26–21. **Drive: 4 plays, 7 yards, 1:01.**

**Top passers**

- CIN – Jeff Driskel – 18/27, 170 yards, 1 TD
- LAC – Philip Rivers – 19/29, 220 yards, 1 TD

**Top rushers**

- CIN – Joe Mixon – 26 carries, 111 yards, 1 TD
- LAC – Austin Ekeler – 15 carries, 66 yards, 1 TD

**Top receivers**

- CIN – Tyler Boyd – 3 receptions, 52 yards
- LAC – Keenan Allen – 5 receptions, 78 yards, 1 TD

==== Week 15: at Kansas City Chiefs ====
Week Fifteen: Los Angeles Chargers at Kansas City Chiefs – Game summary

Quarter	1	2	3	4	Total
**Chargers**	0	7	7	15	**29**
Chiefs	14	0	7	7	**28**

at Arrowhead Stadium, Kansas City, Missouri

- Date: December 13
- Game time: 5:20 p.m. PST/7:20 p.m. CST
- Game weather: 39 °F (4 °C)
- Game attendance: 75,091
- Referee: Walt Anderson
- TV announcers (Fox/NFLN): Joe Buck, Troy Aikman, Erin Andrews and Kristina Pink
- Recap, Gamebook

Game information

**First quarter**

- KC – Demarcus Robinson 5-yard pass from Patrick Mahomes (Harrison Butker kick), 9:09. Chiefs 7–0. **Drive: 10 plays, 49 yards, 4:58.**
- KC – Darrel Williams 11-yard pass from Patrick Mahomes (Harrison Butker kick), 0:43. Chiefs 14–0. **Drive: 10 plays, 80 yards, 4:51.**

**Second quarter**

- LAC – Mike Williams 3-yard pass from Philip Rivers (Michael Badgley kick), 9:43. Chiefs 14–7. **Drive: 10 plays, 75 yards, 6:00.**

**Third quarter**

- KC – Damien Williams 2-yard rush (Michael Badgley kick), 11:38. Chiefs 21–7. **Drive: 7 plays, 74 yards, 3:22.**
- LAC – Mike Williams 19-yard rush (Michael Badgley kick), 4:57. Chiefs 21–14. **Drive: 11 plays, 76 yards, 6:41.**

**Fourth quarter**

- KC – Damien Williams 1-yard rush (Harrison Butker kick), 8:15. Chiefs 28–14. **Drive: 13 plays, 73 yards, 7:55.**
- LAC – Justin Jackson 3-yard rush (Michael Badgley kick), 3:49. Chiefs 28–21. **Drive: 11 plays, 75 yards, 4:26.**
- LAC – Mike Williams 1-yard pass from Philip Rivers (Philip Rivers-Mike Williams pass), 0:04. Chargers 29–28. **Drive: 8 plays, 60 yards, 2:33.**

**Top passers**

- LAC – Philip Rivers – 26/38, 313 yards, 2 TD, 2 INT
- KC – Patrick Mahomes – 24/34, 243 yards, 2 TD

**Top rushers**

- LAC – Justin Jackson – 16 carries, 58 yards, TD
- KC – Damien Williams – 10 carries, 49 yards, 2 TD

**Top receivers**

- LAC – Mike Williams – 7 receptions, 76 yards, 2 TD
- KC – Damien Williams – 6 receptions, 74 yards

==== Week 16: vs. Baltimore Ravens ====
Week Sixteen: Baltimore Ravens at Los Angeles Chargers – Game summary

Quarter	1	2	3	4	Total
**Ravens**	3	3	10	6	**22**
Chargers	0	3	7	0	**10**

at StubHub Center, Carson, California

- Date: December 22
- Game time: 5:20 p.m. PST
- Game weather: 60 °F (16 °C), partly cloudy
- Game attendance: 25,571
- Referee: Clete Blakeman
- TV announcers (NFLN/KABC-TV): Mike Tirico, Kurt Warner and Peter Schrager
- Recap, Gamebook

Game information

**First quarter**

- BAL – Justin Tucker 24-yard field goal, 12:47. Ravens 3–0. **Drive: 5 plays, 46 yards, 2:04.**

**Second quarter**

- BAL – Justin Tucker 35-yard field goal, 2:54. Ravens 6–0. **Drive: 11 plays, 31 yards, 5:21.**
- LAC – Michael Badgley 38-yard field goal, 0:45. Ravens 6–3. **Drive: 9 plays, 56 yards, 2:10.**

**Third quarter**

- LAC – Melvin Gordon 1-yard run (Michael Badgley kick), 13:21. Chargers 10–6. **Drive: 3 plays, 17 yards, 1:26.**
- BAL – Mark Andrews 68-yard pass from Lamar Jackson (Justin Tucker kick), 12:28. Ravens 13–10. **Drive: 2 plays, 85 yards, 1:00.**
- BAL – Justin Tucker 56-yard field goal, 5:41. Ravens 16–10. **Drive: 7 plays, 30 yards, 3:31.**

**Fourth quarter**

- BAL – Tavon Young 62-yard fumble return (run failed), 2:40. Ravens 22–10.

**Top passers**

- BAL – Lamar Jackson – 12/22, 204 yards, TD
- LAC – Philip Rivers – 23/37, 181 yards, 2 INT

**Top rushers**

- BAL – Gus Edwards – 14 rushes, 92 yards
- LAC – Melvin Gordon – 12 rushes, 41 yards, TD

**Top receivers**

- BAL – Mark Andrews – 2 receptions, 83 yards, TD
- LAC – Keenan Allen – 5 receptions, 58 yards

Philip Rivers eclipsed 4,000 yards at the same time as Tom Brady, becoming the third and fourth quarterback in NFL history to reach 4,000 yards in 10 seasons or more, joining Peyton Manning and Drew Brees.

==== Week 17: at Denver Broncos ====
Week Seventeen: Los Angeles Chargers at Denver Broncos – Game summary

Quarter	1	2	3	4	Total
**Chargers**	0	7	7	9	**23**
Broncos	0	3	0	6	**9**

at Broncos Stadium at Mile High, Denver, Colorado

- Date: December 30
- Game time: 1:25 p.m. PST/2:25 p.m. MST
- Game weather: 51 °F (11 °C), mostly cloudy
- Game attendance: 75,947
- Referee: John Parry
- TV announcers (CBS): Spero Dedes and Adam Archuleta
- Recap, Gamebook

Game information

**First quarter**

- No scoring plays

**Second quarter**

- LAC – Kyle Emanuel 18-yard fumble return (Michael Badgley kick), 5:32. Chargers 7–0.
- DEN – Brandon McManus 28-yard field goal, 0:11. Chargers 7–3. **Drive: 7 plays, 10 yards, 1:01.**

**Third quarter**

- LAC – Mike Williams 3-yard pass from Philip Rivers (Michael Badgley kick), 3:46. Chargers 14–3. **Drive: 4 plays, 16 yards, 2:07.**

**Fourth quarter**

- DEN – Andy Janovich 20-yard pass from Case Keenum, 10:10. Chargers 14–9. **Drive: 5 plays, 56 yards, 2:10.**
- LAC – Casey Hayward defensive two-point conversion. Chargers 16–9.
- LAC – Austin Ekeler 1-yard run (Michael Badgley kick), 5:48. Chargers 23–9. **Drive: 7 plays, 75 yards, 4:22.**

**Top passers**

- LAC – Philip Rivers – 14/24, 176 yards, TD, 2 INT
- DEN – Case Keenum – 31/48, 292 yards, TD, INT

**Top rushers**

- LAC – Austin Ekeler – 8 rushes, 58 yards, TD
- DEN – Royce Freeman – 17 rushes, 60 yards

**Top receivers**

- LAC – Mike Williams – 5 receptions, 65 yards, TD
- DEN – DaeSean Hamilton – 5 receptions, 49 yards

=== Standings ===
==== Division ====
AFC West
	W	L	T	PCT	DIV	CONF	PF	PA	STK
^{(1)} Kansas City Chiefs	12	4	0	.750	5–1	10–2	565	421	W1
^{(5)} Los Angeles Chargers	12	4	0	.750	4–2	9–3	428	329	W1
Denver Broncos	6	10	0	.375	2–4	4–8	329	349	L4
Oakland Raiders	4	12	0	.250	1–5	3–9	290	467	L1

==== Conference ====
AFC
#	Team	Division	W	L	T	PCT	DIV	CONF	SOS	SOV	STK
**Division leaders**
1 (Note: Kansas City finished ahead of LA Chargers in the AFC West based on division record, claiming the No. 1 seed.)	Kansas City Chiefs	West	12	4	0	.750	5–1	10–2	.480	.401	W1
2 (Note: New England claimed the No. 2 seed over Houston based on head-to-head victory.)	New England Patriots	East	11	5	0	.688	5–1	8–4	.482	.494	W2
3	Houston Texans	South	11	5	0	.688	4–2	9–3	.471	.435	W1
4	Baltimore Ravens	North	10	6	0	.625	3–3	8–4	.496	.450	W3
**Wild Cards**
5	Los Angeles Chargers	West	12	4	0	.750	4–2	9–3	.477	.422	W1
6	Indianapolis Colts	South	10	6	0	.625	4–2	7–5	.465	.456	W4
**Did not qualify for the postseason**
7	Pittsburgh Steelers	North	9	6	1	.594	4–1–1	6–5–1	.504	.448	W1
8	Tennessee Titans	South	9	7	0	.563	3–3	5–7	.520	.465	L1
9	Cleveland Browns	North	7	8	1	.469	3–2–1	5–6–1	.516	.411	L1
10	Miami Dolphins	East	7	9	0	.438	4–2	6–6	.469	.446	L3
11 (Note: Denver finished ahead of Cincinnati and Buffalo based on strength of victory. Cincinnati finished ahead of Buffalo based on record vs. common opponents. Cincinnati's cumulative record against Baltimore, Indianapolis, the Los Angeles Chargers and Miami was 3–2, compared to Buffalo's 1–4 cumulative record against the same four teams.)	Denver Broncos	West	6	10	0	.375	2–4	4–8	.523	.464	L4
12	Cincinnati Bengals	North	6	10	0	.375	1–5	4–8	.535	.448	L2
13	Buffalo Bills	East	6	10	0	.375	2–4	4–8	.523	.411	W1
14	Jacksonville Jaguars	South	5	11	0	.313	1–5	4–8	.549	.463	L1
15 (Note: NY Jets finished ahead of Oakland based on strength of victory.)	New York Jets	East	4	12	0	.250	1–5	3–9	.506	.438	L3
16	Oakland Raiders	West	4	12	0	.250	1–5	3–9	.547	.406	L1
**Tiebreakers** (Note: When breaking ties for three or more teams under the NFL's rules, they are first broken within divisions, then comparing only the highest ranked remaining team from each division.)

== Postseason ==
=== Schedule ===
Round	Date	Opponent (seed)	Result	Record	Venue	Recap
Wild Card	January 6, 2019	at Baltimore Ravens (4)	W 23–17	1–0	M&T Bank Stadium	Recap
Divisional	January 13, 2019	at New England Patriots (2)	L 28–41	1–1	Gillette Stadium	Recap

=== Game summaries ===
==== AFC Wild Card Playoffs: at (4) Baltimore Ravens ====
AFC Wild Card Playoffs: (5) Los Angeles Chargers at (4) Baltimore Ravens – Game summary

Quarter	1	2	3	4	Total
Chargers	6	6	0	11	23
Ravens	0	0	3	14	17

at M&T Bank Stadium, Baltimore, Maryland

- Date: January 6, 2019
- Game time: 1:05 p.m. EST/10:05 a.m. PST
- Game weather: 52 °F (11 °C), sunny
- Game attendance: 70,432
- Referee: Clete Blakeman
- TV announcers (CBS): Jim Nantz, Tony Romo, Tracy Wolfson and Jay Feely
- Recap, Gamebook

Game information

First quarter

- LAC – Michael Badgley 21-yard field goal, 6:59. Chargers 3–0. Drive: 5 plays, 12 yards, 2:36.
- LAC – Michael Badgley 53-yard field goal, 1:08. Chargers 6–0. Drive: 4 plays, 7 yards, 2:13.

Second quarter

- LAC – Michael Badgley 40-yard field goal, 3:22. Chargers 9–0. Drive: 9 plays, 37 yards, 5:29.
- LAC – Michael Badgley 34-yard field goal, 0:00. Chargers 12–0. Drive: 12 plays, 58 yards, 1:48.

Third quarter

- BAL – Justin Tucker 33-yard field goal, 8:30. Chargers 12–3. Drive: 4 plays, 6 yards, 1:56.

Fourth quarter

- LAC – Melvin Gordon 1-yard run (Philip Rivers-Mike Williams pass), 14:44. Chargers 20–3. Drive: 10 plays, 60 yards, 4:38.
- LAC – Michael Badgley 47-yard field goal, 9:09. Chargers 23–3. Drive: 7 plays, 16 yards, 4:00.
- BAL – Michael Crabtree 31-yard pass from Lamar Jackson (Justin Tucker kick) Chargers 23-10. Drive: 8 plays, 75 yards, 2:36.
- BAL – Michael Crabtree 7-yard pass from Lamar Jackson (Justin Tucker kick) Chargers 23-17. Drive: 12 plays, 80 yards, 2:48.

Top passers

- LAC – Philip Rivers – 22/32, 160 yards
- BAL – Lamar Jackson – 14/29, 194 yards, 2 TD, INT

Top rushers

- LAC – Melvin Gordon – 17 rushes, 40 yards, TD
- BAL – Lamar Jackson – 9 rushes, 54 yards

Top receivers

- LAC – Mike Williams – 2 receptions, 42 yards
- BAL – Michael Crabtree – 2 receptions, 38 yards, 2 TD

The Chargers recorded six sacks, jumped out to a 23–3 lead and halted a late Ravens rally, forcing Lamar Jackson to fumble on the final drive to earn a trip to New England.

On the Ravens' second possession of the game, Chargers defensive end Melvin Ingram forced a fumble from Kenneth Dixon that was recovered by safety Adrian Phillips, giving Los Angeles the ball on the Baltimore 14-yard line. Three plays later, Michael Badgley kicked a 21-yard field goal to give Los Angeles a 3–0 lead. Then the Chargers' defense forced a punt, which Desmond King returned 42 yards to the Ravens' 42-yard line, setting up a 53-yard Badgley field goal that increased their lead to 6–0. Early in the second quarter, Phillips intercepted a pass from Jackson to give the Chargers a first down on the Ravens' 44-yard line. From there, they drove 27 yards to go up 9–0 on Badgley's third field goal. Following another Ravens punt, Los Angeles drove 53 yards in 12 plays to score on Badgley's fourth field goal on the last play of the half, giving them a 12–0 lead.

King returned the second half kickoff 72 yards to the Ravens' 35-yard line, but this time the Chargers failed to score when Badgley's field goal attempt was blocked by Za'Darius Smith. After a Ravens punt, linebacker Patrick Onwuasor forced a fumble from Chargers tight end Virgil Green that was recovered by linebacker C. J. Mosley on the Los Angeles 21-yard line. This set up Justin Tucker's 33-yard field goal, cutting the score to 12–3 with 8:34 left in the third quarter. At the end of Los Angeles' next possession, the Ravens got another scoring opportunity when Javorius Allen blocked Donnie Jones's punt, resulting in Baltimore taking over on the Chargers' 40-yard line; they only managed to gain 4 yards with their next three plays and Tucker's 50-yard field goal attempt was wide right. Los Angeles then drove 60 yards in 10 plays, featuring a 28-yard completion from Philip Rivers to Mike Williams on the Ravens' 15-yard line. On the next play, Melvin Gordon ran the ball 14 yards to the 1-yard line. The Ravens managed to keep Los Angeles out of the end zone for the next three plays, but Gordon scored with a 4th down 1-yard touchdown run on the first play of the 4th quarter; Rivers completed a pass to Williams for a two-point conversion, giving the Chargers a 20–3 lead.

A sack by Ingram on the Ravens' ensuing drive forced them to punt from their 14-yard line and Sam Koch's 31-yard kick gave the Chargers good field position on the Ravens' 45-yard line. Los Angeles then drove 16 yards, including a 9-yard scramble by Rivers on 3rd-and-8, to score on Badgley's 5th field goal, from 47 yards, that gave them a 23–3 lead. Taking the ball back with 9:02 left, Baltimore drove 75 yards in eight plays, including Jackson's 29-yard completion to Willie Snead on 4th-and-11. On the next play, Jackson threw a 31-yard touchdown pass to receiver Michael Crabtree, making the score 23–10. The Chargers recovered Baltimore's ensuing onside kick attempt, but still had to punt after three plays. Baltimore went on to drive 85 yards in 12 plays, the longest a 39-yard completion from Jackson to Dixon. On the last play, Jackson threw a 6-yard touchdown pass to Crabtree, narrowing their gap to 23–17 with 2:06 left. Baltimore then forced a punt with 45 seconds to go, giving them one last chance to drive for a winning touchdown, but Chargers linebacker Uchenna Nwosu forced a fumble while sacking Jackson and Ingram recovered it to give Los Angeles the victory.

Rivers completed 22-of-32 passes for 160 yards and rushed for 15 yards. Ingram finished the game with seven tackles (two for a loss of yards), two sacks, a forced fumble and a fumble recovery. Phillips had five tackles (three solo), an interception and a fumble recovery. King returned a kickoff for 72 yards and had four punt returns for 46 yards. Jackson completed 14-of-29 passes for 194 yards, with two touchdowns and an interception; he was also Baltimore's leading rusher with 9 carries for 54 yards. Onwausor had seven tackles (six solo), a sack and a forced fumble. As of 2025, this remains the last playoff game the Chargers won.

==== AFC Divisional Playoffs: at (2) New England Patriots ====
AFC Divisional Playoffs: (5) Los Angeles Chargers at (2) New England Patriots – Game summary

Quarter	1	2	3	4	Total
Chargers	7	0	7	14	28
Patriots	14	21	3	3	41

at Gillette Stadium, Foxborough, Massachusetts

- Date: January 13, 2019
- Game time: 10:05 a.m. PST/1:05 p.m. EST
- Game weather: 26 °F (−3 °C), sunny and cold
- Game attendance: 65,878
- Referee: Ronald Torbert
- TV announcers (CBS): Jim Nantz, Tony Romo, Tracy Wolfson and Jay Feely
- Recap, Gamebook

Game information

First quarter

- NE – Sony Michel 1-yard run (Stephen Gostkowski kick), 7:49. Patriots 7–0. Drive: 14 plays, 83 yards, 7:11.
- LAC – Keenan Allen 43-yard pass from Philip Rivers (Michael Badgley kick), 4:56. Tied 7–7. Drive: 6 plays, 67 yards, 2:53.
- NE – Sony Michel 14-yard run (Stephen Gostkowski kick), 1:35. Patriots 14–7. Drive: 7 plays, 67 yards, 3:21.

Second quarter

- NE – Phillip Dorsett 15-yard pass from Tom Brady (Stephen Gostkowski kick), 12:17. Patriots 21–7. Drive: 8 plays, 58 yards, 3:07.
- NE – Rex Burkhead 6-yard run (Stephen Gostkowski kick), 6:04. Patriots 28–7. Drive: 6 plays, 87 yards, 3:08.
- NE – Sony Michel 5-yard run (Stephen Gostkowski kick), 1:43. Patriots 35–7. Drive: 4 plays, 35 yards, 1:40.

Third quarter

- NE – Stephen Gostkowski 28-yard field goal, 6:31. Patriots 38–7. Drive: 14 plays, 57 yards, 7:22.
- LAC – Melvin Gordon 1-yard run (Michael Badgley kick), 1:16. Patriots 38–14. Drive: 10 plays, 72 yards, 5:15.

Fourth quarter

- NE – Stephen Gostkowski 30-yard field goal, 12:23. Patriots 41–14. Drive: 8 plays, 63 yards, 3:53.
- LAC – Virgil Green 1-yard pass from Philip Rivers (Philip Rivers–Keenan Allen pass), 7:38. Patriots 41–22. Drive: 6 plays, 80 yards, 2:01.
- LAC – Antonio Gates 8-yard pass from Philip Rivers (pass failed), 0:59. Patriots 41–28. Drive: 12 plays, 80 yards, 2:00.

Top passers

- LAC – Philip Rivers – 25/51, 331 yards, 3 TD, INT
- NE – Tom Brady – 34/44, 343 yards, TD

Top rushers

- LAC – Melvin Gordon – 9 rushes, 15 yards, TD
- NE – Sony Michel – 24 rushes, 129 yards, 3 TD

Top receivers

- LAC – Tyrell Williams – 5 receptions, 94 yards
- NE – Julian Edelman – 9 receptions, 151 yards

New England piled up 347 yards in the first half and scored touchdowns on five of their first six possessions to defeat the Chargers, which sent the Patriots to the AFC championship game for the eighth consecutive season.

The Patriots started the game by driving 83 yards in 14 plays, scoring on Sony Michel's 1-yard touchdown run. Chargers quarterback Philip Rivers quickly led his team right back, completing an 18-yard pass to Mike Williams on 3rd-and-15 before tying the game on a 43-yard touchdown completion to Keenan Allen. New England then drove 67 yards in 7 plays, the longest a 28-yard completion from Tom Brady to receiver Julian Edelman. On the next play, Michel ran 14 yards to the end zone to give the Patriots a 14–7 lead with less than a minute left in the first quarter.

Los Angeles had to punt after three plays and Edelman returned it 6 yards to the Patriots' 42-yard line. Then he caught passes for gains of 11 and 17 yards as New England drove 58 yards to take a 21–7 lead on Brady's 15-yard touchdown pass to receiver Phillip Dorsett. Following another Chargers punt, Brady completed a 25-yard pass to running back James White on New England's first play. A few plays later, Michel took off for a 40-yard run to the Chargers' 9-yard line, where Rex Burkhead took the ball to the end zone over the next two plays, the second a 6-yard touchdown run to put the Patriots up 28–7. The next time New England got the ball, they were forced into a three-and-out, but Chargers returner Desmond King muffed their punt and Albert McClellan recovered it for the Patriots on the Chargers' 35-yard line. Brady then started the ensuing possession with a 19-yard completion to Edelman, while Michel finished it with his third touchdown run, a 5-yard carry, that put the team up 35–7 with 1:40 left in the half. They nearly scored again after forcing a Los Angeles punt, but Dorsett was tackled on the Chargers' 30-yard line as time expired.

In the first half alone, Brady completed 23-of-29 passes for 233 yards and a touchdown, Michel had 16 carries for 105 yards and three touchdowns, White caught 10 passes for 71 yards, and Edelman caught 7 passes for 107 yards while also returning 3 punts for 31 yards.

Los Angeles had to punt on their opening drive of the second half and Brady's 25-yard completion to tight end Rob Gronkowski set up a 28-yard Stephen Gostkowski field goal, increasing New England's lead to 38–7. This time the Chargers were able to respond, as Williams caught 3 passes for 40 yards as the team drove 72 yards in 10 plays to score on Melvin Gordon's 1-yard touchdown run, cutting the score to 38–14. But Los Angeles' defense still could not contain New England, as Brady's completions to Edelman and White for gains of 35 and 23 yards lead to another Gostkowski field goal, giving the Patriots a 41–14 lead with 12:27 left.

Following a few punts, Rivers completed passes to Tyrell Williams and Allen for gains of 29 and 32 yards as the team drove to score on his 1-yard touchdown pass to tight end Virgil Green. Then he completed a pass to Allen for a two-point conversion, making the score 41–22 with 7:28 left. After failing to recover an onside kick, the Chargers forced a punt, but Patriots defensive back Stephon Gilmore ended their following drive with an interception. By the time Los Angeles got the ball back, only three minutes remained, which they used to drive 80 yards in 12 plays to score on Rivers' 8-yard pass to tight end Antonio Gates, making the final score 41–28 following a failed two-point conversion attempt.

Brady completed 34-of-44 passes for 343 yards and a touchdown. Edelman caught 9 passes for 131 yards and returned 5 punts for 37 yards, moving to second place all-time in playoff receptions, behind only Jerry Rice. White tied an all-time playoff record with 15 receptions for 97 yards. Michel ran 24 times for 129 yards and three touchdowns, and caught a pass for 9 yards. Rivers finished the day 25-of-51 for 331 yards, three touchdowns and an interception. Tyrell Williams was his top receiver with 5 receptions for 94 yards.

With this win, Tom Brady improved his record against Rivers to 8–0 (counting regular season and playoff games). It would also prove to be Rivers' last playoff game as a Charger.

Down judge Sarah Thomas became the first woman to officiate an NFL postseason game and second woman to officiate a postseason game in one of the four major North American professional sports leagues, following the NBA’s Violet Palmer.
