= Jahleel Addae =

American football player (born 1990)

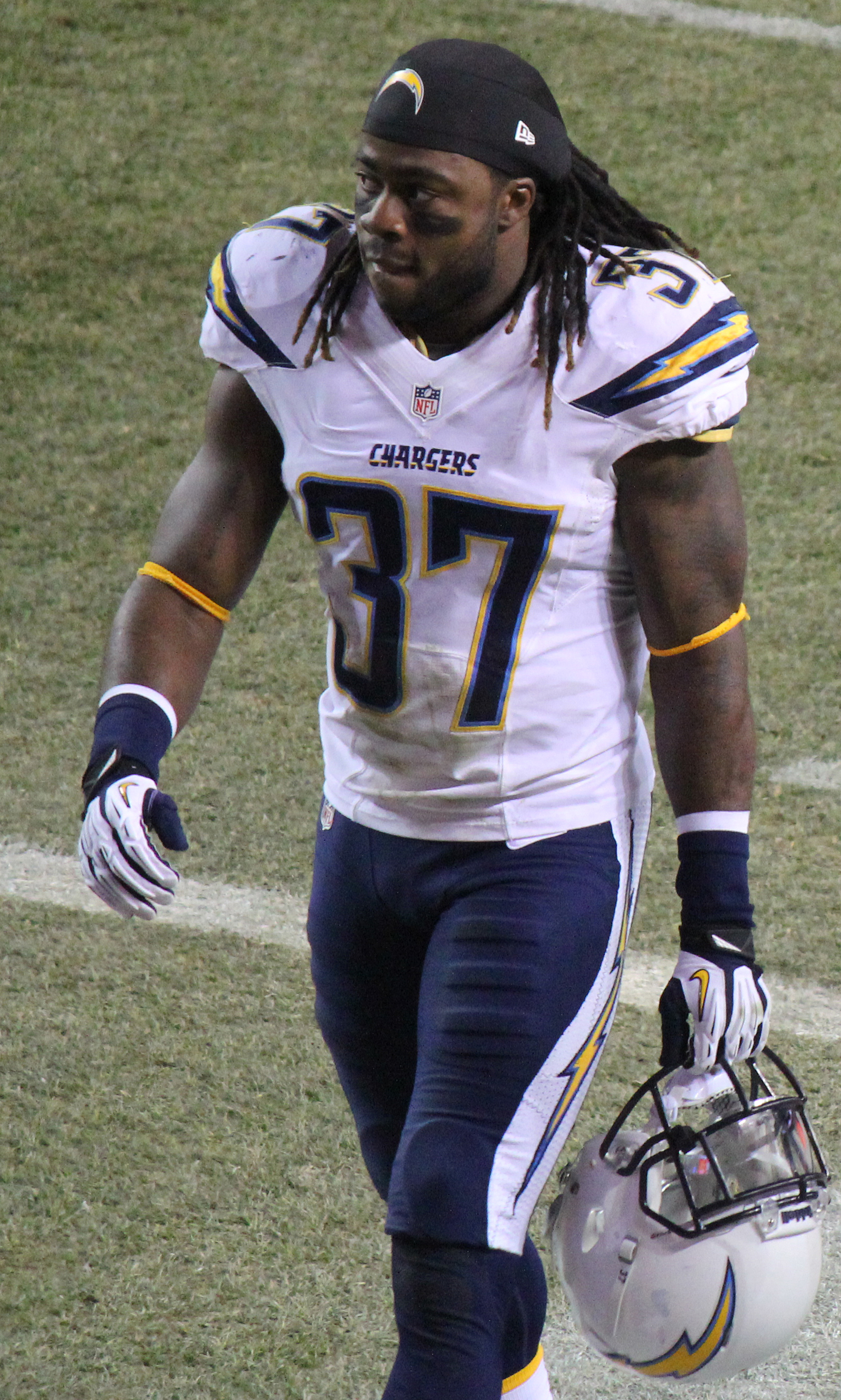
- Addae with the San Diego Chargers in 2013

No. 37, 36, 41, 48
- Position: Safety

Personal information
- Born: January 24, 1990 (age 36); Valrico, Florida, U.S.
- Listed height: 5 ft 10 in (1.78 m)
- Listed weight: 195 lb (88 kg)

Career information
- High school: Riverview (Riverview, Florida)
- College: Central Michigan (2008–2012)
- NFL draft: 2013: undrafted

Career history
- San Diego / Los Angeles Chargers (2013–2018); Houston Texans (2019); Los Angeles Chargers (2020); Indianapolis Colts (2021)

Awards and highlights
- First-team All-MAC (2011); Second-team All-MAC (2012); Third-team All-MAC (2010)

Career NFL statistics
- Total tackles: 453
- Sacks: 5.0
- Forced fumbles: 3
- Fumble recoveries: 3
- Interceptions: 5
- Defensive touchdowns: 1
- Stats at Pro Football Reference

Jahleel Javon Kweku Addae (born January 24, 1990) is an American former professional football player who was a safety in the National Football League (NFL). He played college football for Central Michigan Chippewas, serving as a captain and thrice earning all-Mid-American Conference honors. He was signed by the San Diego Chargers as an undrafted free agent in 2013.

== College career ==
Coming out of Riverview High School, Addae only received three scholarship offers from West Virginia, Iowa State, and Central Michigan.

Addae committed to the Central Michigan Chippewas as a running back. He converted to wide receiver then to defensive back after a coaching change. Addae was named Third-team All-MAC in 2010, First-team in 2011, and Second-team in 2012. Addae finished his career at Central Michigan with 302 tackles, eight interceptions, and three forced fumbles.

== Professional career ==
=== Pre-draft ===
On December 17, 2012, it was announced that Addae had accepted an invitation to play in the 2013 East–West Shrine Game. On January 19, 2013, Addae recorded two solo tackles and helped Leeman Bennett's West team defeat the East 28–13. Unfortunately, Addae was not one of the 60 collegiate defensive backs to receive an invitation to attend the NFL Scouting Combine in Indianapolis, Indiana. On March 11, 2013, he attended Central Michigan's annual pro day and was able to meet multiple team representatives and scouts from 26 NFL teams as his teammate Eric Fisher was a top ten draft pick. He completed all of the combine and positional drills and had an average performance. During the draft process, he had private workouts and meetings with the Oakland Raiders and San Francisco 49ers. At the conclusion of the pre-draft process, Addae was projected to be a seventh-round pick or priority undrafted free agent. He was ranked the 20th best strong safety in the draft by NFLDraftScout.com.

Pre-draft measurables
Height	Weight	Arm length	Hand span	Wingspan	40-yard dash	10-yard split	20-yard split	20-yard shuttle	Three-cone drill	Vertical jump	Broad jump	Bench press
5 ft 9 7/8 in (1.77 m)	195 lb (88 kg)	29 in (0.74 m)	8 7/8 in (0.23 m)	5 ft 10 5/8 in (1.79 m)	4.65 s	1.63 s	2.64 s	4.33 s	6.97 s	38.5 in (0.98 m)	10 ft 4 in (3.15 m)	10 reps
All values from Central Michigan's Pro Day

=== San Diego / Los Angeles Chargers (first stint) ===
==== 2013 ====
On April 29, 2013, the San Diego Chargers signed Addae as an undrafted free agent after he went undrafted in the 2013 NFL draft.

Throughout training camp, he competed against Darrell Stuckey, Brandon Taylor, and Sean Cattouse for a backup safety role. After impressing the coaching staff, head coach Mike McCoy named him the backup free safety behind Eric Weddle to start the regular season. He became the Chargers' extra defensive back in nickel and dime packages as veteran Brandon Taylor was unable to play the first half of the season after undergoing reconstructive surgery on his knee during the offseason.

He made his professional regular season debut in the San Diego Chargers' season-opener against the Houston Texans and recorded four solo tackles in their 31–28 loss. On October 20, 2013, Addae collected a season-high five solo tackles and made his first career sack on Jacksonville Jaguars' quarterback Chad Henne during a 24–6 victory. On December 12, 2013, he earned his first career start and made two solo tackles during a 27–20 victory at the Denver Broncos. Addae finished the season with 38 combined tackles (34 solo), three pass deflections, and one sack in 16 games and two starts.

==== 2014 ====
Addae entered training camp competing against Marcus Gilchrist for the starting strong safety position. Unfortunately, he suffered a hamstring injury during the Chargers' second preseason game against the Seattle Seahawks that caused him to miss the first two games of the regular season. Head coach Mike McCoy named him the backup strong safety behind Marcus Gilchrist to start the regular season.

On September 21, 2014, he earned his first start of the season and recorded a seven combined tackles and sacked E. J. Manuel during a 33–14 win against the Jacksonville Jaguars. On October 23, 2014, Addae made four combined tackles during a 35–21 loss at the Denver Broncos. He suffered a possible concussion in the first quarter, but cleared a sideline concussion screening. The following day, Addae was officially diagnosed with a concussion that caused him to miss three games (Weeks 9–12). On December 14, 2014, Addae made a season-high nine combined tackles in a 22–10 loss to the Denver Broncos. He finished the 2014 season with 48 combined tackles (35 solo), one sack, and. one forced fumble in 11 games and five starts.

==== 2015 ====
Throughout training camp, Addae competed against Jimmy Wilson for the starting strong safety position after it was left vacant by the departure of Marcus Gilchrist to the New York Jets. Head coach Mike McCoy named Addae the starting strong safety, opposite Eric Weddle, to start the regular season.

He started the San Diego Chargers' season-opener against the Detroit Lions and made four solo tackles in their 33–28 victory. Addae suffered a sprained ankle during the game and missed the next three contests (Weeks 2–4). On December 13, 2015, Addae collected a season-high seven solo tackles and deflected one pass in the Chargers' 10–3 loss at the Kansas City Chiefs. On December 24, 2015, he made four solo tackles and sacked Oakland Raiders' quarterback Derek Carr in their 23–20 overtime loss. Addae started 12 games and made 65 combined tackles (55 solo), four pass deflections, and a sack. The San Diego Chargers finished fourth in the AFC West with a 4–12 record.

==== 2016 ====
On March 25, 2016, the San Diego Chargers signed Addae to a second-round tender and agreed to a one-year, $2.55 million contract. Addae entered training camp slated as the starting strong safety, ahead of rookie Adrian McDonald.

Addae started the San Diego Chargers' season-opener at the Kansas City Chiefs and made five combined tackles in the 33–27 loss. During the game he was penalized for a helmet-to-helmet hit on Jeremy Maclin. On September 16, 2016, the NFL fined Addae $24,309 for the hit. The following week, Addae collected six solo tackles and deflected a pass during a 38–14 win against the Jacksonville Jaguars. Unfortunately, Addae left the game in the fourth quarter after suffering a broken clavicle while making a tackle on Denard Robinson. He was sidelined for the next eight games (Weeks 3–10). Addae returned in Week 12 and collected eight combined tackles in the Chargers' 21–13 victory at the Houston Texans. The following week, he recorded a season-high ten combined tackles in a 28–21 loss to the Tampa Bay Buccaneers. On January 1, 2017, Addae made four solo tackles, deflected a pass, and had his first career interception on a pass attempt by Kansas City Chiefs' quarterback Alex Smith during a 37–27 loss. He made his interception off a pass attempt intended for running back Knile Davis and returned it for a 90-yard touchdown to mark the first score of his career. He finished the season with 50 combined tackles (43 solo), four pass deflections, and an interception in eight games and eight starts.

==== 2017 ====
On March 8, 2017, the Los Angeles Chargers signed Addae to a four-year, $22.50 million contract that includes $8 million guaranteed and a signing bonus of $2 million.

Head coach Anthony Lynn named Addae the starting strong safety to start the regular season. On October 1, 2017, Addae recorded a career-high 11 combined tackles in the Chargers' 26–24 loss to the Philadelphia Eagles. During a Week 13 matchup against the Cleveland Browns, he collected six combined tackles and had a season-high two pass deflections in a 19–10 victory. Addae finished the 2017 season with a career-high 96 combined tackles (66 solo), seven pass deflections, and a half a sack in 16 games and 16 starts. It marked the first time he started all 16 games and first time since his rookie season he played in all 16 games.

==== 2018 ====
In 2018, Addae started all 16 games, recording 75 combined tackles, one sack, three passes defensed, and an interception.

On March 9, 2019, Addae was released by the Chargers after six seasons.

=== Houston Texans ===
On May 1, 2019, Addae signed with the Houston Texans. Addae made his debut with the Texans in week 1 against the New Orleans Saints. In the game, Addae made 2 tackles in the 30–28 loss. In week 9 against the Jacksonville Jaguars in London, Addae recorded his first interception of the season off Gardner Minshew in the 26–3 win.

=== Los Angeles Chargers (second stint) ===
On September 23, 2020, Addae was signed to the Los Angeles Chargers practice squad. He was elevated to the active roster on September 26 for the team's week 3 game against the Carolina Panthers, and reverted to the practice squad after the game. He was promoted to the active roster on September 29, 2020. He appeared in 11 games for the Chargers in the 2020 season.

=== Indianapolis Colts ===
On October 26, 2021, Addae was signed to the Indianapolis Colts practice squad. He was promoted to the active roster on November 20. He appeared in nine games for the Colts in the 2021 season.

=== Retirement ===
On December 11, 2023, Addae signed a one-day contract to retire as a member of the Chargers.

== NFL career statistics ==
Legend
**Bold**	Career high

=== Regular season ===
Year	Team	Games		Tackles					Interceptions					Fumbles			
Year	Team	GP	GS	Cmb	Solo	Ast	Sck	TFL	Int	Yds	TD	Lng	PD	FF	FR	Yds	TD
2013	SDG	**16**	2	38	34	4	**1.0**	2	0	0	0	0	3	1	0	0	0
2014	SDG	11	5	48	35	13	**1.0**	1	0	0	0	0	0	**2**	**1**	0	0
2015	SDG	13	12	65	55	10	**1.0**	2	0	0	0	0	4	0	**1**	0	0
2016	SDG	8	8	50	43	7	0.0	3	1	**90**	**1**	**90**	4	0	0	0	0
2017	LAC	**16**	**16**	**96**	**66**	**30**	0.5	**9**	0	0	0	0	**7**	0	0	0	0
2018	LAC	**16**	**16**	75	52	23	**1.0**	1	1	19	0	19	3	0	**1**	0	0
2019	HOU	**16**	3	45	35	10	0.0	0	**2**	5	0	4	3	0	0	0	0
2020	LAC	11	0	21	13	8	0.5	0	1	3	0	3	2	0	0	0	0
2021	IND	9	1	15	10	5	0.0	0	0	0	0	0	0	0	0	0	0
		116	63	453	343	110	5.0	18	5	117	1	90	26	3	3	0	0

=== Playoffs ===
Year	Team	Games		Tackles					Interceptions					Fumbles			
Year	Team	GP	GS	Cmb	Solo	Ast	Sck	TFL	Int	Yds	TD	Lng	PD	FF	FR	Yds	TD
2013	SDG	**2**	1	13	**10**	3	0.0	**1**	0	0	0	0	0	**1**	**1**	0	0
2018	LAC	**2**	**2**	**19**	9	**10**	0.0	**1**	0	0	0	0	0	0	0	0	0
2019	HOU	1	1	2	1	1	0.0	0	0	0	0	0	0	0	0	0	0
		5	4	34	20	14	0.0	2	0	0	0	0	0	1	1	0	0

== Personal life ==
Addae was born to parents of Ghanaian origin. Addae's older brother, Jahmile Addae, played safety at West Virginia from 2002 to 2005 and had short stints with the Tampa Bay Buccaneers and Indianapolis Colts. He was the running backs coach at Cincinnati from 2011 to 2012, was the operation coordinator at Arizona for 5 years, and is now in his 2nd year as a defensive assistant back at his alma mater. Jahmile Addae also served as a defensive graduate assistant at Michigan from 2008 to 2009.

His cousin Alonzo Addae played college football for the University of New Hampshire before transferring to play at West Virginia. Alonzo is coached by Jahmile.
