= Desmond King (American football) =

American football player (born 1994)

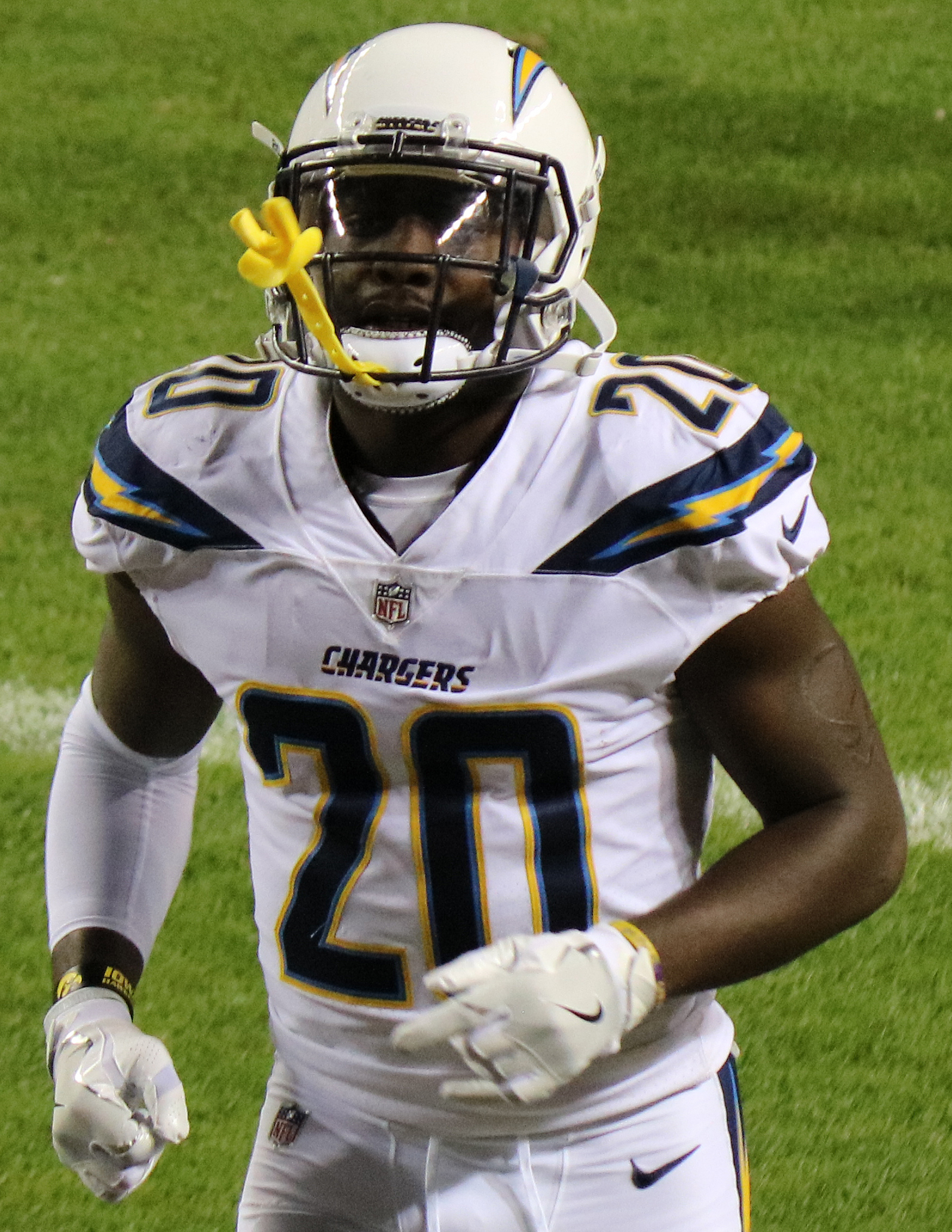
- King II with the Los Angeles Chargers in 2017

No. 20, 33, 25, 35
- Position: Cornerback

Personal information
- Born: December 14, 1994 (age 31); Detroit, Michigan, U.S.
- Listed height: 5 ft 10 in (1.78 m)
- Listed weight: 201 lb (91 kg)

Career information
- High school: East English Village Prep (Detroit)
- College: Iowa (2013–2016)
- NFL draft: 2017: 5th round, 151st overall pick

Career history
- Los Angeles Chargers (2017–2020); Tennessee Titans (2020); Houston Texans (2021–2022); Pittsburgh Steelers (2023); Houston Texans (2023–2024); Baltimore Ravens (2024)

Awards and highlights
- First-team All-Pro (2018) (Note: Selected as a defensive back); Second-team All-Pro (2018) (Note: Selected as a punt returner); Jim Thorpe Award (2015); Jack Tatum Award (2015); Big Ten Defensive Back of the Year (2015); Unanimous All-American (2015); Second-team All-American (2016); 2× First-team All-Big Ten (2015, 2016)

Career NFL statistics
- Total tackles: 476
- Sacks: 9.5
- Forced fumbles: 3
- Fumble recoveries: 7
- Interceptions: 9
- Pass deflections: 35
- Return yards: 2,453
- Total Touchdowns: 5
- Stats at Pro Football Reference

Desmond King II (born December 14, 1994) is an American former professional football player who was a cornerback in the National Football League (NFL). He earned All-Pro honors in 2018 as both a defensive back and a punt returner. He played college football for the Iowa Hawkeyes, and was a unanimous All-American. King was selected by the Los Angeles Chargers in the fifth round of the 2017 NFL draft. He also played in the NFL for the Tennessee Titans, Houston Texans, Pittsburgh Steelers, and Baltimore Ravens.

== Early life ==
King attended East English Village Preparatory Academy in Detroit, Michigan. He played defensive back and running back for the Bulldogs football team. During his career, he set a Michigan high school record with 29 interceptions. He also set a school record for career rushing yards and had 2,360 as a senior. King was rated by Rivals.com a three-star recruit and committed to the University of Iowa to play college football.

== College career ==
King attended Iowa under head coach Kirk Ferentz. As a true freshman at the University of Iowa in 2013, King appeared in all 13 games and made 12 starts. He was the first true freshman to start at defensive back for Iowa since 2002. He started all 13 games his sophomore year in 2014 and had 64 tackles and three interceptions. King returned as a starter his junior year in 2015. He also became Iowa's punt and kick returner. After a terrific junior season in which he had 43 tackles, and a Big-Ten high 8 interceptions, King was named a unanimous All-American and won the 2015 Jim Thorpe Award, which is given to the best defensive back in all of college football. Despite being projected as an early-round pick in the 2016 NFL draft, King announced that he would return to Iowa for his senior season. On November 29, 2016, King was named First-team All-Big Ten Conference for the second season in a row. He was also named a 2016 Associated Press Second-team All-American.

== Professional career ==
External videos
- Desmond King's NFL Combine Workout

Pre-draft measurables
Height	Weight	Arm length	Hand span	40-yard dash	10-yard split	20-yard split	20-yard shuttle	Three-cone drill	Vertical jump	Broad jump	Bench press
5 ft 9 7/8 in (1.77 m)	201 lb (91 kg)	31 1/8 in (0.79 m)	9 5/8 in (0.24 m)	4.60 s	1.57 s	2.64 s	4.18 s	6.67 s	34 in (0.86 m)	9 ft 9 in (2.97 m)	14 reps
All values from NFL Combine/University of Iowa's Pro Day

=== Los Angeles Chargers ===
==== 2017 season ====
The Los Angeles Chargers selected King in the fifth round with the 151st overall pick in the 2017 NFL draft. He was the 21st cornerback and the last of four Iowa players drafted in 2017.

External videos
- Chargers draft Desmond King 151st overall

On May 11, 2017, the Chargers signed King to a four-year, $2.67 million contract that included a signing bonus of $279,992.

Throughout training camp, King competed for the role as the third cornerback on the depth chart against Trevor Williams, Steve Williams, Craig Mager, and Trovon Reed. Head coach Anthony Lynn named King the starting nickelback and the fourth cornerback on the depth chart to start the regular season, behind Jason Verrett, Casey Hayward, and Trevor Williams. Special teams coach George Stewart named King the secondary kick returner, along with wide receiver Isaiah Burse.

He made his professional regular season debut in the Chargers' season-opener at the Denver Broncos and made one pass deflection during their 24–21 loss. Starting cornerback Jason Verrett suffered a torn ACL during the game and was placed on injured reserve for the rest of the season. King was promoted to the third cornerback on the depth chart behind Casey Hayward and Trevor Williams in his absence. The following week, King earned his first career start as the starting nickelback and collected six combined tackles in a 19–17 loss to the Miami Dolphins. In Week 8, King recorded four solo tackles and made his first career sack on Tom Brady during a 21–13 loss at the New England Patriots. On November 23, 2017, King recorded five solo tackles, a pass break up, and returned his first career interception off Dak Prescott for a 90-yard touchdown during a 28–6 victory at the Dallas Cowboys on Thanksgiving. On December 10, 2017, King made his fourth career start and made a season-high ten combined tackles, a pass deflection, and sacked Washington Redskins quarterback Kirk Cousins during the Chargers' 30–13 victory. King finished his rookie season in 2017 with 76 combined tackles (66 solo), five pass deflections, and an interception in 12 games and four starts. He also returned 17 kickoffs for 353 yards. He received an overall grade of 86.5 from Pro Football Focus in 2017, which ranked as the 14th highest grade among all qualifying cornerbacks. His grade was also the third highest among all rookie cornerbacks in 2017.

==== 2018 season ====
King entered training camp slated as a backup cornerback, but became the slot cornerback after Jason Verrett tore his Achilles tendon on the first day of training camp. Head coach Anthony Lynn named King the first-team nickelback and third cornerback on the depth chart to begin the regular season, behind starters Casey Hayward and Trevor Williams.

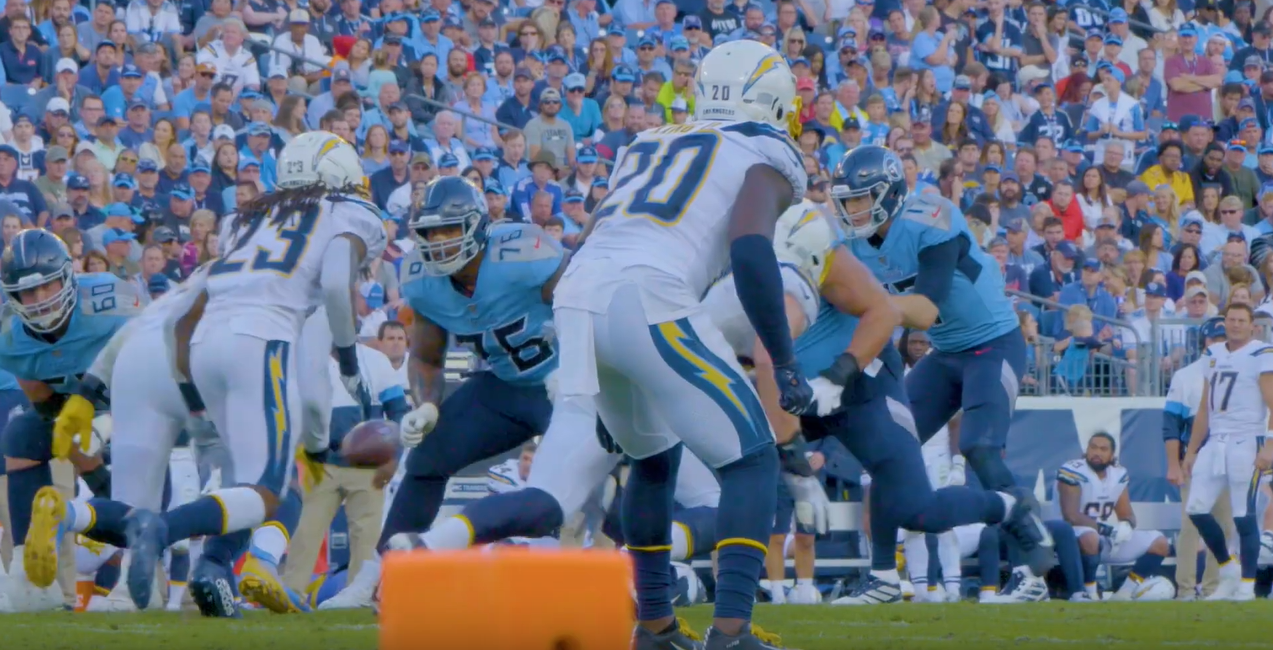
King in a game against the Tennessee Titans

On October 14, 2018, King recorded two solo tackles, three pass deflections, and intercepted two pass attempts by Cleveland Browns quarterback Baker Mayfield during a 38–14 victory at the Browns in Week 6. On November 4, 2018, King made three combined tackles, broke up two pass attempts, and returned an interception for a 42-yard touchdown during a 25–17 win over the Seattle Seahawks in Week 9. King intercepted a pass by Seahawks' quarterback Russell Wilson, which was intended for wide receiver David Moore, during the fourth quarter. His performance in a Week 9 earned him AFC Defensive Player of the Week. In Week 13, King collected a season-high ten combined tackles (nine solo) and returned a punt for a 73-yard touchdown as the Chargers defeated the Pittsburgh Steelers 33–30. He received AFC Special Teams Player of the Week for his performance. He finished the season with 67 combined tackles (47 solo), ten pass deflections, three interceptions, a forced fumble, and one touchdown in 16 games and eight starts. King also had 22 punt returns for 522 yards (23.7 YPR) and 23 kick returns 318 yards and one touchdown (13.8 YPR). King received an overall grade of 90.4 from Pro Football Focus in 2018, which ranked as the second highest grade among all cornerbacks. On January 4, 2019, King was named to the Associated Press All-Pro Team, earning first-team accolades as a defensive back and second-team as a punt returner.

The Chargers finished tied atop the AFC West with a 12–4 record in 2018 and earned a Wild Card berth. On January 6, 2019, King started his first career playoff game and recorded four combined tackles and one sack during the Chargers' 23–17 victory at the Baltimore Ravens in the AFC Wild Card Round.

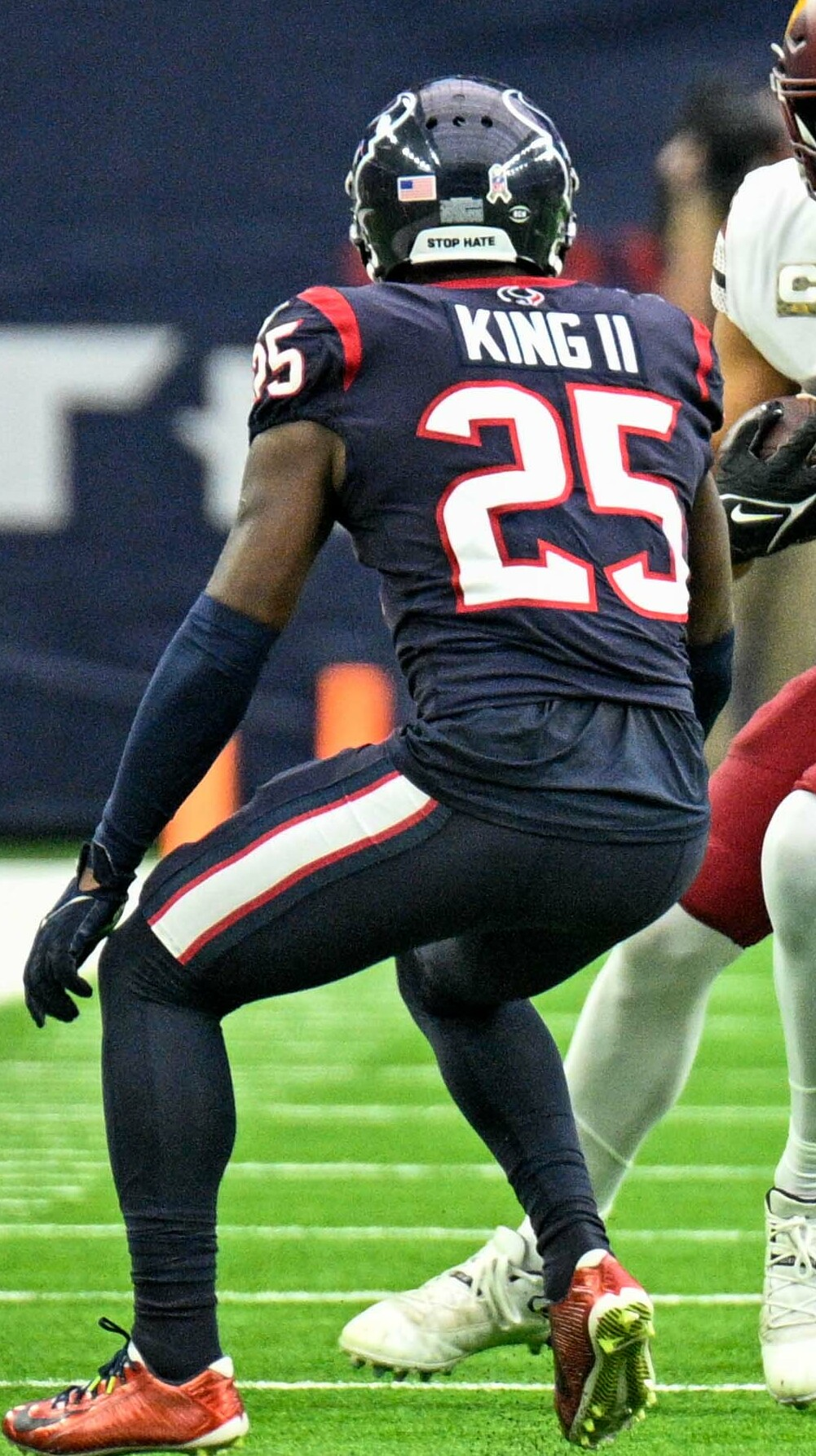
King with the Houston Texans in 2022

==== 2019 season ====
In Week 4 against the Dolphins, King sacked quarterback Josh Rosen 2.5 times in the 30–10 win. In Week 5 against the Broncos, King returned a punt for a 68-yard touchdown in the 20–13 loss. In the 2019 season, King finished with 51 total tackles, two passes defended, and one forced fumble.

=== Tennessee Titans ===
On November 2, 2020, King was traded to the Tennessee Titans in exchange for a sixth round pick in the 2021 NFL draft. King made his debut with the Titans in Week 9 against the Chicago Bears. During the game, King recovered a fumble forced by teammate Jeffery Simmons on David Montgomery and returned it for a 63-yard touchdown during the 24–17 win. In the 2020 season, he finished with 55 total tackles, two passes defended, and one fumble recovery.

=== Houston Texans (first stint) ===
King signed with the Houston Texans on March 30, 2021. He was named a starting cornerback in 2021, recording a career-high 93 tackles, six passes defensed, and three interceptions.

On March 21, 2022, King signed a two-year contract extension with the Texans. In the 2022 season, he appeared in all 17 games, of which he started 13. He finished with 89 total tackles, two interceptions, and eight passes defended.

On August 28, 2023, King was released by the Texans as part of final roster cuts.

=== Pittsburgh Steelers ===
On August 31, 2023, King signed with the Steelers. The Steelers released him on October 18, 2023.

=== Houston Texans (second stint) ===
On November 20, 2023, King was signed to the Texans practice squad. He was signed to the active roster on November 29, 2023.

On March 12, 2024, King signed a one-year contract extension with the Texans. He was released on August 27, and later re-signed to the practice squad. He was released on November 12.

=== Baltimore Ravens ===
On November 19, 2024, King was signed to the Baltimore Ravens' practice squad. He made two appearances for the Ravens, recording three combined tackles.

On December 10, 2025, King announced his retirement from professional football.

== Career statistics ==
Legend
**Bold**	Career high

=== NFL ===
Year	Team	Games		Tackles				Fumbles				Interceptions						Punt returns					Kickoff returns				
Year	Team	GP	GS	Comb	Solo	Ast	Sack	FF	FR	Yds	TD	Int	Yds	Avg	Lng	TD	PD	Ret	Yds	Avg	Lng	TD	Ret	Yds	Avg	Lng	TD
2017	LAC	16	4	76	66	10	**4.0**	0	0	0	0	1	**90**	**90.0**	**90T**	**1**	5	1	2	2.0	2	0	17	353	20.8	44	0
2018	LAC	16	8	62	47	15	0.0	**1**	**2**	0	0	**3**	75	25.0	42T	**1**	**10**	23	**318**	**13.8**	**73T**	**1**	**22**	**522**	23.7	40	0
2019	LAC	15	8	51	40	11	2.5	**1**	**2**	13	0	0	0	0.0	0	0	2	21	118	5.6	68T	**1**	16	331	20.7	43	0
2020	LAC	6	3	24	19	5	1.0	0	0	0	0	—	—	—	—	—	0	6	17	2.8	7	0	—	—	—	—	—
2020	TEN	9	5	31	21	10	1.0	0	1	**63**	**1**	0	0	0.0	0	0	2	—	—	—	—	—	—	—	—	—	—
2021	HOU	16	12	**93**	**78**	25	0.0	**1**	0	0	0	**3**	25	8.3	25	0	6	17	154	9.1	20	0	1	27	27.0	27	0
2022	HOU	17	13	89	59	**30**	0.0	0	**2**	20	0	2	30	15.0	29	0	8	**33**	309	9.4	31	0	1	50	**50.0**	**50**	0
2023	PIT	3	0	0	0	0	0.0	0	0	0	0	—	—	—	—	—	0	—	—	—	—	—	4	88	22.0	27	0
2023	HOU	7	3	47	22	25	1.0	0	0	0	0	0	0	0.0	0	0	2	8	101	12.6	22	0	1	23	23.0	23	0
2024	HOU	1	0	0	0	0	0.0	0	0	0	0	—	—	—	—	—	0	2	2	1.0	2	0	—	—	—	—	—
2024	BAL	2	0	3	2	1	0.0	0	0	0	0	—	—	—	—	—	0	3	38	12.7	22	0	—	—	—	—	—
Career		108	56	476	344	132	9.5	3	7	96	1	9	220	24.4	90	2	35	114	1,049	9.2	73	2	62	1,394	22.5	50	0

=== College ===
Year	Team	GP	Defense				
Year	Team	GP	Tackles	For Loss	Passes Def	Int	FF
**2013**	**Iowa**	13	69	3.0	8	0	0
**2014**	**Iowa**	13	64	2.0	5	3	0
**2015**	**Iowa**	14	**72**	1.0	**13**	**8**	0
**2016**	**Iowa**	13	58	**3.5**	7	3	**1**
**Career**		53	263	9.5	33	14	1
