= Darrell Stuckey =

American football player (born 1987)

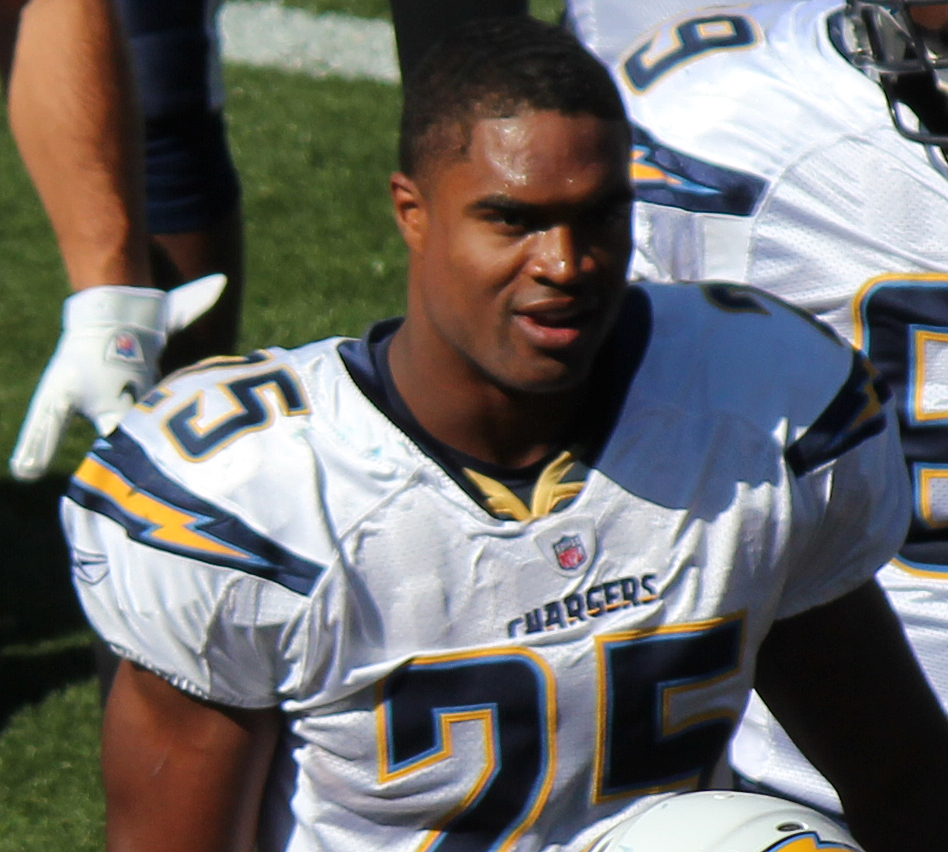
- Stuckey with the San Diego Chargers in 2011

No. 25
- Position: Safety

Personal information
- Born: June 16, 1987 (age 39); Kansas City, Kansas, U.S.
- Listed height: 5 ft 11 in (1.80 m)
- Listed weight: 212 lb (96 kg)

Career information
- High school: Washington (Kansas City)
- College: Kansas
- NFL draft: 2010: 4th round, 110th overall pick

Career history
- San Diego Chargers (2010–2016)

Awards and highlights
- Pro Bowl (2014); First-team All-Big 12 (2008)

Career NFL statistics
- Total tackles: 94
- Sacks: 1
- Forced fumbles: 4
- Fumble recoveries: 4
- Defensive touchdowns: 1
- Stats at Pro Football Reference

Darrell Stuckey, Jr. (born June 16, 1987) is an American former professional football player who was a safety for the San Diego Chargers of the National Football League (NFL). He played college football for the Kansas Jayhawks. Stuckey was an All-Big 12 first-team selection in 2008 and was considered one of the top safeties available in the 2010 NFL draft, in which he was selected by the Chargers in the fourth round.

== Early life ==
Stuckey attended Washington High School in Kansas City, Kansas.

== College career ==
In his sophomore season in 2007, Stuckey started all 13 games at safety and was fourth on the team in tackles with 72.

In his junior season in 2008, Stuckey ranked second on the team in tackles with 98, the most by a Jayhawk defensive back since Tony Stubbs in 2003. He also led the team with five interceptions.

In November 2009, he was named one of the twelve semifinalists for the 2009 Jim Thorpe Award.

On June 10, 2010, he was named the Big 12 Sportsman of the Year for 2009-10.

Stuckey’s 295 career tackles at Kansas were second-most all time among Jayhawks defensive backs. Only former NFL great Leroy Irvin (347) had more. As a junior, Stuckey tallied 93 tackles and became the Jayhawks’ first non-linebacker to lead the team in tackles since 2000.

Stuckey was officially inducted into the Kansas Football Ring of Honor in 2019.

== Professional career ==
Pre-draft measurables
Height	Weight	Arm length	Hand span	40-yard dash	10-yard split	20-yard split	Vertical jump	Broad jump	Bench press
5 ft 11 1/2 in (1.82 m)	205 lb (93 kg)	31 in (0.79 m)	9 3/4 in (0.25 m)	4.49 s	1.60 s	2.65 s	39 1/2 in (1.00 m)	10 ft 0 in (3.05 m)	17 reps
All values from NFL Combine

Stuckey was selected by the San Diego Chargers in the fourth round (110th overall) of the 2010 NFL draft.

In addition to his tackle totals in 2012, Stuckey led the NFL with six punts downed inside the 20, while also forcing a team-high two fumbles, recovering an onside kick and tallying six tackles inside the 20.

The 2012 season was no exception as for the second year in a row, Stuckey tied for the team lead with 12 special teams stops. He did so despite ending the season on injured reserve and not playing in the team’s final three games. His total of 24 special teams tackles over those two seasons is tied for eighth-most in the NFL, and all but one of the players with more have played in the full 32 games, while Stuckey played in just 26.

The 2013 season saw Stuckey as special teams captain for the second year in a row. He played all 16 games, making 21 special team stops and recovering 2 fumbles.

He re-signed with the Chargers on March 8, 2014, keeping him in San Diego on a multi-year deal. For the 2014 season Stuckey was voted special teams captain again for the third year in a row. Against the Seahawks, Stuckey recovered a fumble from Percy Harvin, helping the Chargers to win the game. In the Patriots game, Stuckey recovered a fumble forced by Jahleel Addae and returned it for his first NFL touchdown. Stuckey put up career-high stats of 27 tackles, 2 passes defended, 2 fumble recoveries, and 1 touchdown, leading him to his first Pro Bowl.

For the fourth consecutive year in 2015, Stuckey was voted the Chargers' special teams captain.

On August 4, 2017, Stuckey was released by the Chargers after failing his physical.

On March 15, 2021 Stuckey was hired as the Director of Football Relations for the University of Kansas football program.

== Personal life ==
Stuckey married Lacie Stuckey, previously Reed, a former manager for the Kansas Jayhawks basketball team and the older sister of former Jayhawks guard Tyrel Reed, on Saturday, April 9, 2011. On February 13, 2013, the couple welcomed their first child, a baby boy named Jayton James Stuckey.

Raised by a single mother, Michele Foulks, with his siblings Jamaine Rush and Denae Stuckey, Stuckey graduated in four years and was named to the Athletic Director’s Honor Roll. He was also one of the Jayhawks’ most active participants in student government and community service. Stuckey enjoys delivering motivational speeches and regularly volunteers to lend a helping hand with community projects in San Diego.

Stuckey is a Christian. Stuckey established "Living4One", an organization to "help people discover that they were created to influence the world in a positive way" through living for Jesus.
