= 2019 Los Angeles Chargers season =

60th season in franchise history; final one with Philip Rivers

- Chargers 60th season logo
- Owner: Dean Spanos
- General manager: Tom Telesco
- Head coach: Anthony Lynn
- Home stadium: Dignity Health Sports Park

Results
- Record: 5–11
- Division place: 4th AFC West
- Playoffs: Did not qualify
- All-Pros: None
- Pro Bowlers: 3: WR Keenan Allen; DE Joey Bosa; DE Melvin Ingram

The 2019 season was the Los Angeles Chargers' 50th in the National Football League (NFL), their 60th overall, their fourth in the Greater Los Angeles Area and their third under head coach Anthony Lynn. It also marked the Chargers' third and final season playing their home games at Dignity Health Sports Park, as the team moved into SoFi Stadium in Inglewood beginning with the 2020 season alongside the Los Angeles Rams. With a 2–5 record after Week 7, the Chargers failed to match or improve on their 12–4 record from 2018. Despite winning on the road against the Jacksonville Jaguars in Week 14, the Chargers were mathematically eliminated from playoff contention the same week as a result of the Pittsburgh Steelers beating the Arizona Cardinals 23–17. After a Week 15 loss to the Minnesota Vikings, the Chargers suffered their first losing season since 2016, and their first as a Los Angeles-based team. Also, for the first time since 2015, the Chargers were swept by their division. The Chargers also suffered the most one-score losses by an NFL team during the season, with nine.

This was also the final season with longtime quarterback Philip Rivers, as he signed with the Indianapolis Colts in the offseason.

== Uniform change ==
On April 16, the Chargers announced that the powder blue jerseys that served as the alternate colored jersey would become the primary home colored jerseys, replacing the navy blue jerseys that served as the primary home colored jersey since the team's 2007 uniform overhaul. On September 2, the Chargers announced their uniform schedule for the 2019 season. In addition to this uniform switch, the Chargers silently ditched their navy blue facemask for gold. However, the navy blue facemask was still used in games where the Chargers wore navy blue jerseys.

== NFL draft ==
2019 Los Angeles Chargers draft
Round	Selection	Player	Position	College	Notes
1	28	Jerry Tillery	DT	Notre Dame	
2	60	Nasir Adderley	S	Delaware	
3	91	Trey Pipkins	OT	Sioux Falls	
4	130	Drue Tranquill	LB	Notre Dame	
5	166	Easton Stick	QB	North Dakota State	
6	200	Emeke Egbule	LB	Houston	
7	242	Cortez Broughton	DT	Cincinnati	

== Roster changes ==
=== Free agents ===
Player	Acquired from	Lost to	Date	Contract terms
OLB Thomas Davis	Carolina Panthers		—	2 years
QB Tyrod Taylor	Cleveland Browns		—	2 years
WR Dontrelle Inman	New England Patriots		20 August 2019	TBA
WR Tyrell Williams		Oakland Raiders	-	4 years
DE Darius Philon		Arizona Cardinals	-	2 years
CB Jason Verrett		San Francisco 49ers	-	2 years
S Jahleel Addae		Houston Texans	-	1 year
TE Antonio Gates		Retired	-	-

== Staff ==
2019 Los Angeles Chargers staff
Front office: Chairman/Owner/president – Dean Spanos; Vice chairman – Michael Spanos; Executive vice president/COO/CFO – Jeanne M. Bonk; CEO/president – business operations – A. G. Spanos; General manager – Tom Telesco; President – football operations – John Spanos; Executive vice president of football administration/player finance – Ed McGuire; Senior executive – Randy Mueller; Director of pro scouting – Dennis Abraham; Senior director of pro personnel – Louis Clark; Director of player personnel – JoJo Wooden; Director of college scouting – Kevin Kelly; Head coaches: Head coach – Anthony Lynn; Assistant head coach/special teams coordinator – George Stewart; Offensive coaches: Interim offensive coordinator – Shane Steichen; Running backs – Alfredo Roberts; Wide receivers – Phil McGeoghan; Tight ends – Rip Scherer; Offensive line – Pat Meyer; Assistant offensive line – Mark Ridgley; Offensive quality control – Dan Shamash	Defensive coaches: Defensive coordinator – Gus Bradley; Defensive line – Giff Smith; Linebackers – Richard Smith; Defensive backs – Ron Milus; Assistant defensive backs – Chris Harris; Defensive quality control – Addison Lynch; Strength and conditioning: Head strength and conditioning – John Lott; Assistant strength – Jonathan Brooks

== Final roster ==
2019 Los Angeles Chargers roster
Quarterbacks (QB): 17 Philip Rivers; 2 Easton Stick; 5 Tyrod Taylor; Running backs (RB): 30 Austin Ekeler; 25 Melvin Gordon; 22 Justin Jackson; 35 Troymaine Pope; 34 Derek Watt FB; Wide receivers (WR): 13 Keenan Allen; 15 Jalen Guyton; 89 Jason Moore; 16 Andre Patton; 81 Mike Williams; Tight ends (TE): 88 Virgil Green; 86 Hunter Henry; 87 Lance Kendricks	Offensive linemen (OL): 74 Spencer Drango G/T; 66 Dan Feeney G/C; 72 Ryan Groy C/G; 76 Russell Okung T; 79 Trey Pipkins T; 61 Scott Quessenberry C; 75 Michael Schofield G; 78 Trent Scott T; 69 Sam Tevi T; Defensive linemen (DL): 97 Joey Bosa DE; 54 Melvin Ingram DE; 93 Justin Jones DT; 92 Brandon Mebane DT; 42 Uchenna Nwosu DE; 98 Isaac Rochell DE; 71 Damion Square DT; 99 Jerry Tillery DT; 96 Sylvester Williams DT	Linebackers (LB): 57 Jatavis Brown OLB; 58 Thomas Davis OLB; 48 Nick Dzubnar MLB; 51 Emeke Egbule OLB; 52 Denzel Perryman MLB; 49 Drue Tranquill MLB; 44 Kyzir White OLB; Defensive backs (DB): 43 Michael Davis CB; 28 Brandon Facyson CB; 26 Casey Hayward CB; 33 Derwin James FS; 23 Rayshawn Jenkins SS; 20 Desmond King CB; 31 Adrian Phillips FS; 36 Roderic Teamer FS; 27 Jaylen Watkins FS; Special teams (ST): 4 Michael Badgley K; 1 Ty Long P; 45 Cole Mazza LS	Practice squad: 82 Stephen Anderson TE; 37 Tevaughn Campbell CB; 46 Malik Jefferson OLB; 83 Anthony Johnson WR; 94 P. J. Johnson DT; 3 Tyron Billy-Johnson WR; 90 Anthony Lanier DE; 29 Quenton Meeks SS; 10 Artavis Scott WR (IR); 73 Tyree St. Louis T; 64 Cole Toner C/G; Reserve: 32 Nasir Adderley SS (IR); 12 Travis Benjamin WR (IR); 91 Cortez Broughton DT (NF-Ill.); 84 Dylan Cantrell WR (IR); 80 Sean Culkin TE (IR); 11 Geremy Davis WR (IR); 77 Forrest Lamp G (IR); 65 Koda Martin G (IR); 53 Mike Pouncey C (IR); 87 Andrew Vollert TE (IR); Rookies in italics 53 active, 11 reserve, 10 practice squad

== Preseason ==
Week	Date	Opponent	Result	Record	Venue	Recap
1	August 8	at Arizona Cardinals	L 13–17	0–1	State Farm Stadium	Recap
2	August 18	New Orleans Saints	L 17–19	0–2	Dignity Health Sports Park	Recap
3	August 24	Seattle Seahawks	L 15–23	0–3	Dignity Health Sports Park	Recap
4	August 29	at San Francisco 49ers	W 27–24	1–3	Levi's Stadium	Recap

== Regular season ==
The Chargers' regular season schedule was released on April 19.

=== Schedule ===
Week	Date	Opponent	Result	Record	Venue	Recap
1	September 8	Indianapolis Colts	**W** 30–24 (OT)	1–0	Dignity Health Sports Park	Recap
2	September 15	at Detroit Lions	**L** 10–13	1–1	Ford Field	Recap
3	September 22	Houston Texans	**L** 20–27	1–2	Dignity Health Sports Park	Recap
4	September 29	at Miami Dolphins	**W** 30–10	2–2	Hard Rock Stadium	Recap
5	October 6	**Denver Broncos**	**L** 13–20	2–3	Dignity Health Sports Park	Recap
6	October 13	Pittsburgh Steelers	**L** 17–24	2–4	Dignity Health Sports Park	Recap
7	October 20	at Tennessee Titans	**L** 20–23	2–5	Nissan Stadium	Recap
8	October 27	at Chicago Bears	**W** 17–16	3–5	Soldier Field	Recap
9	November 3	Green Bay Packers	**W** 26–11	4–5	Dignity Health Sports Park	Recap
10	November 7	at **Oakland Raiders**	**L** 24–26	4–6	RingCentral Coliseum	Recap
11	November 18	**Kansas City Chiefs**	**L** 17–24	4–7	Estadio Azteca (Mexico City)	Recap
12	Bye					
13	December 1	at **Denver Broncos**	**L** 20–23	4–8	Empower Field at Mile High	Recap
14	December 8	at Jacksonville Jaguars	**W** 45–10	5–8	TIAA Bank Field	Recap
15	December 15	Minnesota Vikings	**L** 10–39	5–9	Dignity Health Sports Park	Recap
16	December 22	**Oakland Raiders**	**L** 17–24	5–10	Dignity Health Sports Park	Recap
17	December 29	at **Kansas City Chiefs**	**L** 21–31	5–11	Arrowhead Stadium	Recap

Note: Intra-division opponents are in bold text.

=== Game summaries ===
==== Week 1: vs. Indianapolis Colts ====
Week One: Indianapolis Colts at Los Angeles Chargers – Game summary

Quarter	1	2	3	4	OT	Total
Colts	0	6	10	8	0	**24**
**Chargers**	7	10	7	0	6	**30**

at Dignity Health Sports Park, Carson, California

- Date: September 8
- Game time: 1:05 p.m. PDT
- Game weather: Sunny, 77 °F (25 °C)
- Game attendance: 25,363
- Referee: Shawn Smith
- TV announcers (CBS): Greg Gumbel, Trent Green and Melanie Collins
- Recap, Game Book

Game information

**First quarter**

- LAC – Austin Ekeler 1-yard pass from Philip Rivers (Ty Long kick), 2:55. Chargers 7–0. **Drive: 11 plays, 68 yards, 6:15.**

**Second quarter**

- IND – T. Y. Hilton 4-yard pass from Jacoby Brissett (kick failed, wide right), 10:02. Chargers 7–6. **Drive: 14 plays, 75 yards, 7:53.**
- LAC – Keenan Allen 28-yard pass from Philip Rivers (Ty Long kick), 5:58. Chargers 14–6. **Drive: 6 plays, 75 yards, 4:04.**
- LAC – Ty Long 40-yard field goal, 1:02. Chargers 17–6. **Drive: 10 plays, 24 yards, 3:17.**

**Third quarter**

- IND – Adam Vinatieri 44-yard field goal, 11:15. Chargers 17–9. **Drive: 8 plays, 49 yards, 3:45.**
- LAC – Austin Ekeler 55-yard pass from Philip Rivers (Ty Long kick), 8:27. Chargers 24–9. **Drive: 4 plays, 75 yards, 2:48.**
- IND – Marlon Mack 63-yard run (Adam Vinatieri kick), 7:40. Chargers 24–16. **Drive: 2 plays, 75 yards, 0:47.**

**Fourth quarter**

- IND – T. Y. Hilton 19-yard pass from Jacoby Brissett (Marlon Mack run), 0:38. Tied 24–24. **Drive: 16 plays, 80 yards, 7:52.**

**Overtime**

- LAC – Austin Ekeler 7-yard run, 5:01. Chargers 30–24. **Drive: 8 plays, 75 yards, 4:59.**

**Top passers**

- IND – Jacoby Brissett – 21/27, 190 yards, 2 TD
- LAC – Philip Rivers – 25/34, 333 yards, 3 TD, INT

**Top rushers**

- IND – Marlon Mack – 25 rushes, 174 yards, TD
- LAC – Austin Ekeler – 12 rushes, 58 yards, TD

**Top receivers**

- IND – T. Y. Hilton – 8 receptions, 87 yards, 2 TD
- LAC – Keenan Allen – 8 receptions, 123 yards, TD

The Chargers won their first home opener since 2015, when they were based in San Diego. They also started 1–0 for the first time since 2015. The Chargers open their third and final season at Dignity Health Sports Park, as they will move into SoFi Stadium in Inglewood in 2020.

==== Week 2: at Detroit Lions ====
Week Two: Los Angeles Chargers at Detroit Lions – Game summary

Quarter	1	2	3	4	Total
Chargers	7	3	0	0	**10**
**Lions**	6	0	0	7	**13**

at Ford Field, Detroit, Michigan

- Date: September 15
- Game time: 10:00 a.m. PDT/1:00 p.m. EDT
- Game weather: None (indoor stadium)
- Game attendance: 60,158
- Referee: Craig Wrolstad
- TV announcers (CBS): Kevin Harlan, Rich Gannon and Jay Feely
- Recap, Game Book

Game information

**First quarter**

- LAC – Austin Ekeler 1-yard run (Ty Long kick), 7:57. Chargers 7–0. **Drive: 9 plays, 68 yards, 4:24.**
- DET – Kerryon Johnson 36-yard pass from Matthew Stafford (kick failed, wide left), 4:10. Chargers 7–6. **Drive: 8 plays, 75 yards, 3:47.**

**Second quarter**

- LAC – Ty Long 39-yard field goal, 0:00. Chargers 10–6. **Drive: 7 plays, 76 yards, 1:20.**

**Third quarter**

- No scoring plays.

**Fourth quarter**

- DET – Kenny Golladay 31-yard pass from Matthew Stafford (Matt Prater kick), 7:21. Lions 13–10. **Drive: 8 plays, 69 yards, 4:24.**

**Top passers**

- LAC – Philip Rivers – 21/36, 293 yards, INT
- DET – Matthew Stafford – 22/30, 245 yards, 2 TD, 2 INT

**Top rushers**

- LAC – Austin Ekeler – 17 rushes, 66 yards, TD
- DET – Kerryon Johnson – 12 rushes, 41 yards

**Top receivers**

- LAC – Keenan Allen – 8 receptions, 98 yards
- DET – Kenny Golladay – 8 receptions, 117 yards, TD

==== Week 3: vs. Houston Texans ====
Week Three: Houston Texans at Los Angeles Chargers – Game summary

Quarter	1	2	3	4	Total
**Texans**	0	7	14	6	**27**
Chargers	7	10	0	3	**20**

at Dignity Health Sports Park, Carson, California

- Date: September 22
- Game time: 1:25 p.m. PDT
- Game weather: Partly cloudy, 87 °F (31 °C)
- Game attendance: 25,349
- Referee: Clay Martin
- TV announcers (CBS): Spero Dedes and Adam Archuleta
- Recap, Game Book

Game information

**First quarter**

- LAC – Keenan Allen 7-yard pass from Philip Rivers (Ty Long kick), 9:41. Chargers 7–0. **Drive: 3 plays, 15 yards, 1:28.**

**Second quarter**

- LAC – Ty Long 34-yard field goal, 10:32. Chargers 10–0. **Drive: 15 plays, 72 yards, 8:41.**
- HOU – Darren Fells 16-yard pass from Deshaun Watson (Kaʻimi Fairbairn kick), 8:11. Chargers 10–7. **Drive: 5 plays, 75 yards, 2:21.**
- LAC – Keenan Allen 12-yard pass from Philip Rivers (Ty Long kick), 0:22. Chargers 17–7. **Drive: 8 plays, 89 yards, 1:18.**

**Third quarter**

- HOU – Carlos Hyde 3-yard run (Kaʻimi Fairbairn kick), 7:31. Chargers 17–14. **Drive: 8 plays, 55 yards, 3:37.**
- HOU – Jordan Akins 15-yard pass from Deshaun Watson (Kaʻimi Fairbairn kick), 1:19. Texans 21–17. **Drive: 6 plays, 73 yards, 2:24.**

**Fourth quarter**

- HOU – Jordan Akins 53-yard pass from Deshaun Watson (kick failed, wide right), 9:40. Texans 27–17. **Drive: 7 plays, 82 yards, 3:48.**
- LAC – Ty Long 43-yard field goal, 7:14. Texans 27–20. **Drive: 6 plays, 50 yards, 2:26.**

**Top passers**

- HOU – Deshaun Watson – 25/34, 351 yards, 3 TD
- LAC – Philip Rivers – 31/46, 318 yards, 2 TD

**Top rushers**

- HOU – Carlos Hyde – 10 rushes, 19 yards, TD
- LAC – Austin Ekeler – 9 rushes, 36 yards

**Top receivers**

- HOU – Kenny Stills – 4 receptions, 89 yards
- LAC – Keenan Allen – 13 receptions, 183 yards, 2 TD

==== Week 4: at Miami Dolphins ====
Week Four: Los Angeles Chargers at Miami Dolphins – Game summary

Quarter	1	2	3	4	Total
**Chargers**	10	7	3	10	**30**
Dolphins	7	3	0	0	**10**

at Hard Rock Stadium, Miami Gardens, Florida

- Date: September 29
- Game time: 10:00 a.m. PDT/1:00 p.m. EDT
- Game weather: Mostly cloudy, 88 °F (31 °C)
- Game attendance: 64,278
- Referee: Tony Corrente
- TV announcers (CBS): Tom McCarthy and Jay Feely
- Recap, Game Book

Game information

**First quarter**

- LAC – Ty Long 44-yard field goal, 10:12. Chargers 3–0. **Drive: 9 plays, 49 yards, 4:48.**
- MIA – DeVante Parker 34-yard pass from Josh Rosen (Jason Sanders kick), 6:32. Dolphins 7–3. **Drive: 6 plays, 75 yards, 3:40.**
- LAC – Troymaine Pope 13-yard pass from Philip Rivers (Ty Long kick), 2:45. Chargers 10–7. **Drive: 7 plays, 75 yards, 3:47.**

**Second quarter**

- MIA – Jason Sanders 30-yard field goal, 11:10. Tied 10–10. **Drive: 12 plays, 67 yards, 6:35.**
- LAC – Austin Ekeler 18-yard pass from Philip Rivers (Ty Long kick), 0:43. Chargers 17–10. **Drive: 8 plays, 60 yards, 2:51.**

**Third quarter**

- LAC – Ty Long 45-yard field goal, 1:22. Chargers 20–10. **Drive: 16 plays, 66 yards, 10:33.**

**Fourth quarter**

- LAC – Austin Ekeler 1-yard run (Ty Long kick), 11:20. Chargers 27–10. **Drive: 7 plays, 56 yards, 3:29.**
- LAC – Ty Long 51-yard field goal, 7:21. Chargers 30–10. **Drive: 6 plays, 15 yards, 3:07.**

**Top passers**

- LAC – Philip Rivers – 24/30, 310 yards, 2 TD
- MIA – Josh Rosen – 17/24, 180 yards, TD, INT

**Top rushers**

- LAC – Austin Ekeler – 18 rushes, 60 yards, TD
- MIA – Kenyan Drake – 9 rushes, 44 yards

**Top receivers**

- LAC – Dontrelle Inman – 5 receptions, 76 yards
- MIA – DeVante Parker – 4 receptions, 70 yards, TD

This was the Chargers' first win in Miami since the 1982 Epic in Miami game.

==== Week 5: vs. Denver Broncos ====
Week Five: Denver Broncos at Los Angeles Chargers – Game summary

Quarter	1	2	3	4	Total
**Broncos**	14	3	0	3	**20**
Chargers	0	0	7	6	**13**

at Dignity Health Sports Park, Carson, California

- Date: October 6
- Game time: 1:05 p.m. PDT
- Game weather: Sunny, 85 °F (29 °C)
- Game attendance: 25,357
- Referee: Shawn Hochuli
- TV announcers (CBS): Jim Nantz, Tony Romo and Tracy Wolfson
- Recap, Game Book

Game information

**First quarter**

- DEN – Phillip Lindsay 4-yard run (Brandon McManus kick), 11:06. Broncos 7–0. **Drive: 7 plays, 75 yards, 3:54.**
- DEN – Courtland Sutton 70-yard pass from Joe Flacco (Brandon McManus kick), 4:58. Broncos 14–0. **Drive: 5 plays, 81 yards, 2:17.**

**Second quarter**

- DEN – Brandon McManus 40-yard field goal, 5:17. Broncos 17–0. **Drive: 8 plays, 40 yards, 3:27.**

**Third quarter**

- LAC – Desmond King 68-yard punt return (Chase McLaughlin kick), 0:31. Broncos 17–7.

**Fourth quarter**

- LAC – Chase McLaughlin 45-yard field goal, 6:47. Broncos 17–10. **Drive: 4 plays, 29 yards, 2:08.**
- DEN – Brandon McManus 46-yard field goal, 1:55. Broncos 20–10. **Drive: 5 plays, 41 yards, 1:25.**
- LAC – Chase McLaughlin 32-yard field goal, 0:10. Broncos 20–13. **Drive: 8 plays, 61 yards, 1:45.**

**Top passers**

- DEN – Joe Flacco – 14/20, 182 yards, TD, INT
- LAC – Philip Rivers – 32/48, 211 yards, 2 INT

**Top rushers**

- DEN – Phillip Lindsay – 15 rushes, 114 yards, TD
- LAC – Melvin Gordon – 12 rushes, 31 yards

**Top receivers**

- DEN – Courtland Sutton – 4 receptions, 92 yards, TD
- LAC – Austin Ekeler – 15 receptions, 86 yards

==== Week 6: vs. Pittsburgh Steelers ====
Week Six: Pittsburgh Steelers at Los Angeles Chargers – Game summary

Quarter	1	2	3	4	Total
**Steelers**	14	7	3	0	**24**
Chargers	0	0	0	17	**17**

at Dignity Health Sports Park, Carson, California

- Date: October 13
- Game time: 5:20 p.m. PDT
- Game weather: Clear, 71 °F (22 °C)
- Game attendance: 25,425
- Referee: John Hussey
- TV announcers (NBC): Al Michaels, Cris Collinsworth and Michele Tafoya
- Recap, Game Book

Game information

**First quarter**

- PIT – Devin Bush Jr. 9-yard fumble return (Chris Boswell kick), 10:51. Steelers 7–0.
- PIT – James Conner 12-yard run (Chris Boswell kick), 4:29. Steelers 14–0. **Drive: 7 plays, 40 yards, 4:23.**

**Second quarter**

- PIT – James Conner 26-yard pass from Devlin Hodges (Chris Boswell kick), 6:34. Steelers 21–0. **Drive: 14 plays, 86 yards, 9:09.**

**Third quarter**

- PIT – Chris Boswell 20-yard field goal, 8:12. Steelers 24–0. **Drive: 13 plays, 73 yards, 6:48.**

**Fourth quarter**

- LAC – Chase McLaughlin 38-yard field goal, 14:00. Steelers 24–3. **Drive: 11 plays, 71 yards, 3:59.**
- LAC – Hunter Henry 5-yard pass from Philip Rivers (Chase McLaughlin kick), 7:13. Steelers 24–10. **Drive: 10 plays, 70 yards, 3:23.**
- LAC – Hunter Henry 11-yard pass from Philip Rivers (Chase McLaughlin kick), 1:29. Steelers 24–17. **Drive: 8 plays, 79 yards, 2:24.**

**Top passers**

- PIT – Devlin Hodges – 15/20, 132 yards, TD, INT
- LAC – Philip Rivers – 26/44, 320 yards, 2 TD, 2 INT

**Top rushers**

- PIT – Benny Snell – 17 rushes, 75 yards
- LAC – Melvin Gordon – 8 rushes, 18 yards

**Top receivers**

- PIT – James Conner – 7 receptions, 78 yards, TD
- LAC – Hunter Henry – 8 receptions, 100 yards, 2 TD

==== Week 7: at Tennessee Titans ====
Week Seven: Los Angeles Chargers at Tennessee Titans – Game summary

Quarter	1	2	3	4	Total
Chargers	3	7	0	10	**20**
**Titans**	3	7	0	13	**23**

at Nissan Stadium, Nashville, Tennessee

- Date: October 20
- Game time: 1:05 p.m. PDT/3:05 p.m. CDT
- Game weather: Sunny, 77 °F (25 °C)
- Game attendance: 62,431
- Referee: Bill Vinovich
- TV announcers (CBS): Ian Eagle, Dan Fouts and Evan Washburn
- Recap, Game Book

Game information

**First quarter**

- TEN – Cody Parkey 45-yard field goal, 6:02. Titans 3–0. **Drive: 9 plays, 42 yards, 4:54.**
- LAC – Chase McLaughlin 29-yard field goal, 0:02. Tied 3–3. **Drive: 12 plays, 64 yards, 6:00.**

**Second quarter**

- LAC – Melvin Gordon 1-yard pass from Philip Rivers (Chase McLaughlin kick), 3:38. Chargers 10–3. **Drive: 14 plays, 94 yards, 7:37.**
- TEN – Corey Davis 8-yard pass from Ryan Tannehill (Cody Parkey kick), 0:23. Tied 10–10. **Drive: 8 plays, 86 yards, 3:15.**

**Third quarter**

- No scoring plays.

**Fourth quarter**

- TEN – Tajae Sharpe 5-yard pass from Ryan Tannehill (kick failed), 13:11. Titans 16–10. **Drive: 14 plays, 85 yards, 7:09.**
- LAC – Chase McLaughlin 50-yard field goal, 10:55. Titans 16–13. **Drive: 6 plays, 43 yards, 2:16.**
- TEN – Derrick Henry 11-yard run (Cody Parkey kick), 6:39. Titans 23–13. **Drive: 7 plays, 75 yards, 4:16.**
- LAC – Austin Ekeler 41-yard pass from Philip Rivers (Chase McLaughlin kick), 5:09. Titans 23–20. **Drive: 4 plays, 75 yards, 1:30.**

**Top passers**

- LAC – Philip Rivers – 24/38, 329 yards, 2 TD
- TEN – Ryan Tannehill – 23/29, 312 yards, 2 TD, INT

**Top rushers**

- LAC – Melvin Gordon – 16 rushes, 32 yards
- TEN – Derrick Henry – 22 rushes, 90 yards, TD

**Top receivers**

- LAC – Austin Ekeler – 7 receptions, 118 yards, TD
- TEN – Corey Davis – 6 receptions, 80 yards, TD

==== Week 8: at Chicago Bears ====
Week Eight: Los Angeles Chargers at Chicago Bears – Game summary

Quarter	1	2	3	4	Total
**Chargers**	0	7	3	7	**17**
Bears	0	9	7	0	**16**

at Soldier Field, Chicago, Illinois

- Date: October 27
- Game time: 10:00 a.m. PDT/12:00 p.m. CDT
- Game weather: Clear, 52 °F (11 °C)
- Game attendance: 61,632
- Referee: Brad Rogers
- TV announcers (Fox): Thom Brennaman, Chris Spielman and Shannon Spake
- Recap, Game Book

Game information

**First quarter**

- No scoring plays.

**Second quarter**

- CHI – Eddy Piñeiro 22-yard field goal, 14:45. Bears 3–0. **Drive: 4 plays, 0 yards, 0:52.**
- CHI – Eddy Piñeiro 25-yard field goal, 4:16. Bears 6–0. **Drive: 9 plays, 64 yards, 4:29.**
- LAC – Melvin Gordon 19-yard run (Chase McLaughlin kick), 2:12. Chargers 7–6. **Drive: 4 plays, 75 yards, 2:04.**
- CHI – Eddy Piñeiro 19-yard field goal, 0:00. Bears 9–7. **Drive: 11 plays, 76 yards, 2:12.**

**Third quarter**

- CHI – David Montgomery 4-yard run (Eddy Piñeiro kick), 8:08. Bears 16–7. **Drive: 11 plays, 75 yards, 6:52.**
- LAC – Chase McLaughlin 20-yard field goal, 0:39. Bears 16–10. **Drive: 14 plays, 73 yards, 7:29.**

**Fourth quarter**

- LAC – Austin Ekeler 11-yard pass from Philip Rivers (Chase McLaughlin kick), 8:04. Chargers 17–16. **Drive: 3 plays, 26 yards, 1:21.**

**Top passers**

- LAC – Philip Rivers – 19/29, 201 yards, TD, INT
- CHI – Mitchell Trubisky – 23/35, 253 yards, INT

**Top rushers**

- LAC – Melvin Gordon – 8 rushes, 31 yards, TD
- CHI – David Montgomery – 27 rushes, 135 yards, TD

**Top receivers**

- LAC – Mike Williams – 3 receptions, 69 yards
- CHI – Anthony Miller – 3 receptions, 67 yards

==== Week 9: vs. Green Bay Packers ====
Week Nine: Green Bay Packers at Los Angeles Chargers – Game summary

Quarter	1	2	3	4	Total
Packers	0	0	3	8	**11**
**Chargers**	6	3	10	7	**26**

at Dignity Health Sports Park, Carson, California

- Date: November 3
- Game time: 1:25 p.m. PST
- Game weather: Clear, 79 °F (26 °C)
- Game attendance: 25,435
- Referee: Adrian Hill
- TV announcers (CBS): Jim Nantz, Tony Romo and Tracy Wolfson
- Recap, Game Book

Game information

**First quarter**

- LAC – Michael Badgley 29-yard field goal, 6:56. Chargers 3–0. **Drive: 15 plays, 84 yards, 8:04.**
- LAC – Michael Badgley 40-yard field goal, 1:04. Chargers 6–0. **Drive: 5 plays, 37 yards, 3:09.**

**Second quarter**

- LAC – Michael Badgley 34-yard field goal, 0:00. Chargers 9–0. **Drive: 13 plays, 76 yards, 4:21.**

**Third quarter**

- LAC – Michael Badgley 43-yard field goal, 9:41. Chargers 12–0. **Drive: 8 plays, 52 yards, 3:36.**
- LAC – Melvin Gordon 1-yard run (Michael Badgley kick), 3:56. Chargers 19–0. **Drive: 6 plays, 27 yards, 3:20.**
- GB – Mason Crosby 54-yard field goal, 0:46. Chargers 19–3. **Drive: 8 plays, 24 yards, 3:10.**

**Fourth quarter**

- LAC – Melvin Gordon 1-yard run (Michael Badgley kick), 10:32. Chargers 26–3. **Drive: 10 plays, 75 yards, 5:14.**
- GB – Jamaal Williams 10-yard pass from Aaron Rodgers, (Aaron Rodgers run), 6:21. Chargers 26–11. **Drive: 9 plays, 75 yards, 4:11.**

**Top passers**

- GB – Aaron Rodgers – 23/35, 161 yards, TD
- LAC – Philip Rivers – 21/28, 294 yards

**Top rushers**

- GB – Aaron Jones – 8 rushes, 30 yards
- LAC – Melvin Gordon – 20 rushes, 80 yards, 2 TD

**Top receivers**

- GB – Allen Lazard – 3 receptions, 44 yards
- LAC – Mike Williams – 3 receptions, 111 yards

==== Week 10: at Oakland Raiders ====
Week Ten: Los Angeles Chargers at Oakland Raiders – Game summary

Quarter	1	2	3	4	Total
Chargers	0	14	3	7	**24**
**Raiders**	10	7	3	6	**26**

at Ring Central Coliseum, Oakland, California

- Date: November 7
- Game time: 5:20 p.m. PST
- Game weather: Partly cloudy, 54 °F (12 °C)
- Game attendance: 51,954
- Referee: Walt Anderson
- TV announcers (Fox/NFLN/Amazon Prime): Joe Buck, Troy Aikman, Erin Andrews and Kristina Pink
- Recap, Game Book

Game information

**First quarter**

- OAK – Daniel Carlson 40-yard field goal, 8:01. Raiders 3–0 **Drive: 6 plays, 9 yards, 3:50.**
- OAK – Erik Harris 56-yard interception return (Daniel Carlson kick), 6:02. Raiders 10–0.

**Second quarter**

- LAC – Hunter Henry 2-yard pass from Philip Rivers (Michael Badgley kick), 8:24. Raiders 10–7 **Drive: 16 plays, 77 yards, 8:14.**
- LAC – Melvin Gordon 3-yard run (Michael Badgley kick), 4:14. Chargers 14–10 **Drive: 4 plays, 49 yards, 2:06.**
- OAK – Alec Ingold 9-yard pass from Derek Carr (Daniel Carlson kick), 0:20. Raiders 17–14 **Drive: 10 plays, 76 yards, 3:54.**

**Third quarter**

- OAK – Daniel Carlson 22-yard field goal, 11:33. Raiders 20–14 **Drive: 9 plays, 69 yards, 3:27.**
- LAC – Michael Badgley 27-yard field goal, 0:25. Raiders 20–17 **Drive: 6 plays, 74 yards, 3:31.**

**Fourth quarter**

- LAC – Austin Ekeler 6-yard pass from Philip Rivers (Michael Badgley kick), 4:02. Chargers 24–20 **Drive: 12 plays, 80 yards, 8:05.**
- OAK – Josh Jacobs 18-yard run (kick failed, wide right), 1:02. Raiders 26–24 **Drive: 10 plays, 75 yards, 3:00.**

**Top passers**

- LAC – Philip Rivers – 17/31, 207 yards, 2 TD, 3 INT
- OAK – Derek Carr – 21/31, 218 yards, TD

**Top rushers**

- LAC – Melvin Gordon – 22 rushes, 108 yards, TD
- OAK – Josh Jacobs – 16 rushes, 71 yards, TD

**Top receivers**

- LAC – Keenan Allen – 8 receptions, 68 yards
- OAK – Jalen Richard – 4 receptions, 43 yards

==== Week 11: vs. Kansas City Chiefs ====
NFL International Series

Week Eleven: Kansas City Chiefs at Los Angeles Chargers – Game summary

Quarter	1	2	3	4	Total
**Chiefs**	0	10	14	0	**24**
Chargers	3	6	8	0	**17**

at Estadio Azteca, Mexico City, Mexico

- Date: November 18
- Game time: 5:15 p.m. PST/7:15 p.m. CST
- Game weather: Cloudy, 67 °F (19 °C)
- Game attendance: 76,252
- Referee: Brad Allen
- TV announcers (ESPN/KABC): Joe Tessitore, Booger McFarland, Lisa Salters and John Parry
- Recap, Game Book

Game information

**First quarter**

- LAC – Michael Badgley 27-yard field goal, 9:31. Chargers 3–0. **Drive: 9 plays, 68 yards, 5:29.**

**Second quarter**

- KC – LeSean McCoy 6-yard run (Harrison Butker kick), 8:45. Chiefs 7–3. **Drive: 1 play, 6 yards, 0:05.**
- LAC – Michael Badgley 26-yard field goal, 5:01. Chiefs 7–6. **Drive: 9 plays, 67 yards, 3:44.**
- KC – Harrison Butker 41-yard field goal, 1:43. Chiefs 10–6. **Drive: 9 plays, 52 yards, 3:18.**
- LAC – Michael Badgley 49-yard field goal, 0:00. Chiefs 10–9. **Drive: 9 plays, 44 yards, 1:43.**

**Third quarter**

- KC – Darrel Williams 6-yard run (Harrison Butker kick), 9:29. Chiefs 17–9. **Drive: 9 plays, 75 yards, 5:31.**
- KC – Travis Kelce 23-yard pass from Patrick Mahomes (Harrison Butker kick), 4:56. Chiefs 24–9. **Drive: 6 plays, 54 yards, 3:20.**
- LAC – Keenan Allen 7-yard pass from Philip Rivers (Philip Rivers–Hunter Henry pass), 1:44. Chiefs 24–17. **Drive: 6 plays, 75 yards, 3:12.**

**Fourth quarter**

- No scoring plays.

**Top passers**

- KC – Patrick Mahomes – 19/32, 182 yards, TD, INT
- LAC – Philip Rivers – 28/52, 353 yards, TD, 4 INT

**Top rushers**

- KC – Patrick Mahomes – 5 rushes, 59 yards
- LAC – Melvin Gordon – 14 rushes, 69 yards

**Top receivers**

- KC – Travis Kelce – 7 receptions, 92 yards, TD
- LAC – Austin Ekeler – 8 receptions, 108 yards

==== Week 13: at Denver Broncos ====
Week Thirteen: Los Angeles Chargers at Denver Broncos – Game summary

Quarter	1	2	3	4	Total
Chargers	0	10	0	10	**20**
**Broncos**	14	3	0	6	**23**

at Empower Field at Mile High, Denver, Colorado

- Date: December 1
- Game time: 2:25 p.m. MST/1:25 p.m. PST
- Game weather: Mostly sunny, 33 °F (1 °C)
- Game attendance: 74,638
- Referee: Brad Rogers
- TV announcers (CBS): Andrew Catalon, James Lofton and Michael Grady
- Recap, Game Book

Game information

**First quarter**

- DEN – Courtland Sutton 26-yard pass from Drew Lock (Brandon McManus kick), 4:33. Broncos 7–0. **Drive: 12 plays, 80 yards, 5:55.**
- DEN – Courtland Sutton 5-yard pass from Drew Lock (Brandon McManus kick), 0:16. Broncos 14–0. **Drive: 6 plays, 18 yards, 2:56.**

**Second quarter**

- LAC – Michael Badgley 30-yard field goal, 9:27. Broncos 14–3. **Drive: 14 plays, 63 yards, 5:49.**
- DEN – Brandon McManus 31-yard field goal, 5:32. Broncos 17–3. **Drive: 4 plays, 8 yards, 2:07.**
- LAC – Austin Ekeler 30-yard pass from Philip Rivers (Michael Badgley kick), 0:30. Broncos 17–10. **Drive: 3 plays, 77 yards, 0:22.**

**Third quarter**

- No scoring plays.

**Fourth quarter**

- LAC – Keenan Allen 36-yard pass from Philip Rivers (Michael Badgley kick), 12:18. Tied 17–17. **Drive: 5 plays, 62 yards, 2:34.**
- DEN – Brandon McManus 52-yard field goal, 4:26. Broncos 20–17. **Drive: 8 plays, 21 yards, 4:48.**
- LAC – Michael Badgley 46-yard field goal, 0:14. Tied 20–20. **Drive: 8 plays, 46 yards, 4:12.**
- DEN – Brandon McManus 53-yard field goal, 0:00. Broncos 23–20. **Drive: 1 play, 37 yards, 0:14.**

**Top passers**

- LAC – Philip Rivers – 20/29, 265 yards, 2 TD, INT
- DEN – Drew Lock – 18/28, 134 yards, 2 TD, INT

**Top rushers**

- LAC – Melvin Gordon – 20 rushes, 99 yards
- DEN – Phillip Lindsay – 17 rushes, 58 yards

**Top receivers**

- LAC – Mike Williams – 5 receptions, 117 yards
- DEN – Courtland Sutton – 4 receptions, 74 yards, 2 TD

==== Week 14: at Jacksonville Jaguars ====
Week Fourteen: Los Angeles Chargers at Jacksonville Jaguars – Game summary

Quarter	1	2	3	4	Total
**Chargers**	7	17	14	7	**45**
Jaguars	3	0	7	0	**10**

at TIAA Bank Field, Jacksonville, Florida

- Date: December 8
- Game time: 4:05 p.m. EST/1:05 p.m. PST
- Game attendance: 57,866
- Referee: Bill Vinovich
- TV announcers (Fox): Dick Stockton, Mark Schlereth and Jennifer Hale
- Recap, Game Book

Game information

**First quarter**

- JAX - Josh Lambo 26-yard field goal, 7:23. Jaguars 3-0. **Drive: 14 plays, 67 yards, 7:37.**
- LAC - Melvin Gordon 1-yard run (Michael Badgley kick), 5:46. Chargers 7-3. **Drive: 3 plays, 79 yards, 1:37.**

**Second quarter**

- LAC - Derek Watt 1-yard run (Michael Badgley kick), 5:18. Chargers 14-3. **Drive: 10 plays, 75 yards, 6:11.**
- LAC - Hunter Henry 30-yard pass from Philip Rivers (Michael Badgley kick), 1:34. Chargers 21-3. **Drive: 2 plays, 80 yards, 0:18.**
- LAC - Michael Badgley 40-yard field goal, 0:03. Chargers 24-3. **Drive: 8 plays, 57 yards, 1:07.**

**Third quarter**

- LAC - Austin Ekeler 84-yard pass from Philip Rivers (Michael Badgley kick), 13:53. Chargers 31-3. **Drive: 3 plays, 84 yards, 1:07.**
- JAX - Nick O'Leary 12-yard pass from Gardner Minshew (Josh Lambo kick), 5:48. Chargers 31-10. **Drive: 14 plays, 70 yards, 8:05.**
- LAC - Mike Williams 44-yard pass from Philip Rivers (Michael Badgley kick), 1:51. Chargers 38-10. **Drive: 6 plays, 73 yards, 3:57.**

**Fourth quarter**

- LAC - Virgil Green 14-yard pass from Tyrod Taylor (Michael Badgley kick), 10:53. Chargers 45-10. **Drive: 7 plays, 38 yards, 4:01.**

**Top passers**

- JAX – Gardner Minshew – 24/37, 162 yards, TD
- LAC – Philip Rivers – 16/22, 314 yards, 3 TD

**Top rushers**

- JAX – Leonard Fournette – 15 rushes, 50 yards
- LAC – Austin Ekeler – 8 rushes, 101 yards

**Top receivers**

- JAX – D. J. Chark – 9 receptions, 75 yards
- LAC – Austin Ekeler – 4 receptions, 112 yards, TD

==== Week 15: vs. Minnesota Vikings ====
Week Fifteen: Minnesota Vikings at Los Angeles Chargers – Game summary

Quarter	1	2	3	4	Total
**Vikings**	6	13	6	14	**39**
Chargers	3	7	0	0	**10**

at Dignity Health Sports Park, Carson, California

- Date: December 15
- Game time: 1:05 p.m. PST
- Game weather: Sunny, 64 °F (18 °C)
- Game attendance: 25,446
- Referee: Ronald Torbert
- TV announcers (CBS): Greg Gumbel, Trent Green and Melanie Collins
- Recap, Game Book

Game information

**First quarter**

- MIN – Irv Smith Jr. 1-yard pass from Kirk Cousins (kick failed, hit right upright), 9:10. Vikings 6–0. **Drive: 10 plays, 75 yards, 5:50.**
- LAC – Michael Badgley 41-yard field goal, 4:35. Vikings 6–3. **Drive: 10 plays, 62 yards, 4:35.**

**Second quarter**

- MIN – Dan Bailey 26-yard field goal, 14:57. Vikings 9–3. **Drive: 4 plays, 4 yards, 1:29.**
- LAC – Mike Williams 2-yard pass from Philip Rivers (Michael Badgley kick), 8:42. Chargers 10–9. **Drive: 10 plays, 75 yards, 6:15.**
- MIN – Dan Bailey 44-yard field goal, 4:17. Vikings 12–10. **Drive: 10 plays, 49 yards, 4:25.**
- MIN – Ifeadi Odenigbo 56-yard fumble return (Dan Bailey kick), 0:07. Vikings 19–10.

**Third quarter**

- MIN – Dan Bailey 38-yard field goal, 12:37. Vikings 22–10. **Drive: 4 plays, 6 yards, 2:12.**
- MIN – Dan Bailey 27-yard field goal, 7:06. Vikings 25–10. **Drive: 7 plays, 32 yards, 4:03.**

**Fourth quarter**

- MIN – Mike Boone 8-yard run (Dan Bailey kick), 10:25. Vikings 32–10. **Drive: 7 plays, 85 yards, 4:30.**
- MIN – Mike Boone 2-yard run (Dan Bailey kick), 8:45. Vikings 39–10. **Drive: 3 plays, 10 yards, 1:32.**

**Top passers**

- MIN – Kirk Cousins – 19/25, 207 yards, TD, INT
- LAC – Philip Rivers – 28/39, 307 yards, TD, 3 INT

**Top rushers**

- MIN – Mike Boone – 13 rushes, 56 yards, 2 TD
- LAC – Melvin Gordon – 7 rushes, 28 yards

**Top receivers**

- MIN – Stefon Diggs – 4 receptions, 76 yards
- LAC – Keenan Allen – 9 receptions, 99 yards

==== Week 16: vs. Oakland Raiders ====
Week Sixteen: Oakland Raiders at Los Angeles Chargers – Game summary

Quarter	1	2	3	4	Total
**Raiders**	7	7	7	3	**24**
Chargers	0	7	7	3	**17**

at Dignity Health Sports Park, Carson, California

- Date: December 22
- Game time: 1:05 p.m. PST
- Game weather: Partly cloudy, 64 °F (18 °C)
- Game attendance: 25,380
- Referee: Clay Martin
- TV announcers (CBS): Greg Gumbel, Trent Green and Melanie Collins
- Recap, Game Book

Game information

**First quarter**

- OAK – Hunter Renfrow 56-yard pass from Derek Carr (Daniel Carlson kick), 10:57. Raiders 7–0. **Drive: 4 plays, 71 yards, 1:48.**

**Second quarter**

- LAC – Melvin Gordon 1-yard run (Michael Badgley kick), 1:54. Tied 7–7. **Drive: 8 plays, 78 yards, 3:58.**
- OAK – Derek Carr 3-yard run (Daniel Carlson kick), 0:08. Raiders 14–7. **Drive: 11 plays, 75 yards, 1:46.**

**Third quarter**

- OAK – DeAndre Washington 5-yard run (Daniel Carlson kick), 6:11. Raiders 21–7. **Drive: 13 plays, 75 yards, 8:49.**
- LAC – Melvin Gordon 1-yard run (Michael Badgley kick), 1:04. Raiders 21–14. **Drive: 10 plays, 83 yards, 5:07.**

**Fourth quarter**

- OAK – Daniel Carlson 48-yard field goal, 8:28. Raiders 24–14. **Drive: 12 plays, 48 yards, 7:36.**
- LAC – Michael Badgley 27-yard field goal, 1:29. Raiders 24–17. **Drive: 13 plays, 81 yards, 2:03.**

**Top passers**

- OAK – Derek Carr – 26/30, 291 yards, TD
- LAC – Philip Rivers – 27/39, 279 yards

**Top rushers**

- OAK – DeAndre Washington – 23 rushes, 85 yards, TD
- LAC – Melvin Gordon – 9 rushes, 15 yards, 2 TD

**Top receivers**

- OAK – Hunter Renfrow – 7 receptions, 107 yards, TD
- LAC – Keenan Allen – 5 receptions, 71 yards

This was Chargers final home game at Dignity Health Sports Park before moving into their new stadium in the 2020 season. This was also the last time they faced the Oakland Raiders—home or away—prior to the Raiders relocation to Las Vegas in 2020.

==== Week 17: at Kansas City Chiefs ====
Week Seventeen: Los Angeles Chargers at Kansas City Chiefs – Game summary

Quarter	1	2	3	4	Total
Chargers	0	7	7	7	**21**
**Chiefs**	3	7	14	7	**31**

at Arrowhead Stadium, Kansas City, Missouri

- Date: December 29
- Game time: 12:00 p.m. CST/10:00 a.m. PST
- Game weather: Cloudy, 40 °F (4 °C)
- Game attendance: 73,680
- Referee: Walt Anderson
- TV announcers (CBS): Kevin Harlan, Rich Gannon and John Schriffen
- Recap, Game Book

Game information

**First quarter**

- KC – Harrison Butker 40-yard field goal, 1:29. Chiefs 3–0. **Drive: 15 plays, 62 yards, 8:12.**

**Second quarter**

- LAC – Keenan Allen 12-yard pass from Philip Rivers (Michael Badgley kick), 11:44. Chargers 7–3. **Drive: 11 plays, 74 yards, 4:45.**
- KC – Demarcus Robinson 24-yard pass from Patrick Mahomes (Harrison Butker kick), 2:16. Chiefs 10–7. **Drive: 4 plays, 57 yards, 1:29.**

**Third quarter**

- LAC – Melvin Gordon 5-yard run (Michael Badgley kick), 13:14. Chargers 14–10. **Drive: 3 plays, 21 yards, 1:26.**
- KC – Mecole Hardman 104-yard kickoff return (Harrison Butker kick), 12:58. Chiefs 17–14.
- KC – Damien Williams 84-yard run (Harrison Butker kick), 6:26. Chiefs 24–14. **Drive: 1 play, 84 yards, 0:15.**

**Fourth quarter**

- LAC – Hunter Henry 8-yard pass from Philip Rivers (Michael Badgley kick), 5:23. Chiefs 24–21. **Drive: 14 plays, 86 yards, 7:11.**
- KC – Damien Williams 7-yard run (Harrison Butker kick), 2:37. Chiefs 31–21. **Drive: 8 plays, 77 yards, 2:46.**

**Top passers**

- LAC – Philip Rivers – 31/46, 281 yards, 2 TD, 2 INT
- KC – Patrick Mahomes – 16/25, 174 yards, TD, INT

**Top rushers**

- LAC – Melvin Gordon – 14 rushes, 46 yards, TD
- KC – Damien Williams – 12 rushes, 124 yards, 2 TD

**Top receivers**

- LAC – Keenan Allen – 9 receptions, 82 yards, TD
- KC – Tyreek Hill – 4 receptions, 61 yards

=== Standings ===
==== Division ====
AFC West
	W	L	T	PCT	DIV	CONF	PF	PA	STK
^{(2)} Kansas City Chiefs	12	4	0	.750	6–0	9–3	451	308	W6
Denver Broncos	7	9	0	.438	3–3	6–6	282	316	W2
Oakland Raiders	7	9	0	.438	3–3	5–7	313	419	L1
Los Angeles Chargers	5	11	0	.313	0–6	3–9	337	345	L3

==== Conference ====
AFC
#	Team	Division	W	L	T	PCT	DIV	CONF	SOS	SOV	STK
**Division leaders**
1	Baltimore Ravens	North	14	2	0	.875	5–1	10–2	.494	.484	W12
2 (Note: Kansas City claimed the No. 2 seed over New England based on head-to-head victory.)	Kansas City Chiefs	West	12	4	0	.750	6–0	9–3	.510	.477	W6
3	New England Patriots	East	12	4	0	.750	5–1	8–4	.469	.411	L1
4	Houston Texans	South	10	6	0	.625	4–2	8–4	.520	.488	L1
**Wild Cards**
5	Buffalo Bills	East	10	6	0	.625	3–3	7–5	.461	.363	L2
6	Tennessee Titans	South	9	7	0	.563	3–3	7–5	.488	.465	W1
**Did not qualify for the postseason**
7	Pittsburgh Steelers	North	8	8	0	.500	3–3	6–6	.502	.324	L3
8 (Note: Denver finished ahead of Indianapolis and NY Jets based on conference record. Division tiebreak was initially used to eliminate Oakland (see below).) (Note: Denver finished ahead of Oakland based on conference record.)	Denver Broncos	West	7	9	0	.438	3–3	6–6	.510	.406	W2
9 (Note: Oakland and Indianapolis finished ahead of NY Jets based on conference record.) (Note: Oakland finished ahead of Indianapolis based on head-to-head victory.)	Oakland Raiders	West	7	9	0	.438	3–3	5–7	.482	.335	L1
10	Indianapolis Colts	South	7	9	0	.438	3–3	5–7	.492	.500	L1
11	New York Jets	East	7	9	0	.438	2–4	4–8	.473	.402	W2
12 (Note: Jacksonville finished ahead of Cleveland based on record against common opponents. Jacksonville's cumulative record against Cincinnati, Denver, NY Jets, and Tennessee was 4–1, compared to Cleveland's 2–3 cumulative record against the same four teams.)	Jacksonville Jaguars	South	6	10	0	.375	2–4	6–6	.484	.406	W1
13	Cleveland Browns	North	6	10	0	.375	3–3	6–6	.533	.479	L3
14 (Note: LA Chargers finished ahead of Miami based on head-to-head victory.)	Los Angeles Chargers	West	5	11	0	.313	0–6	3–9	.514	.488	L3
15	Miami Dolphins	East	5	11	0	.313	2–4	4–8	.484	.463	W2
16	Cincinnati Bengals	North	2	14	0	.125	1–5	2–10	.553	.406	W1
**Tiebreakers** (Note: When breaking ties for three or more teams under the NFL's rules, they are first broken within divisions, then comparing only the highest ranked remaining team from each division.)
