= Travis Benjamin =

American football player (born 1989)

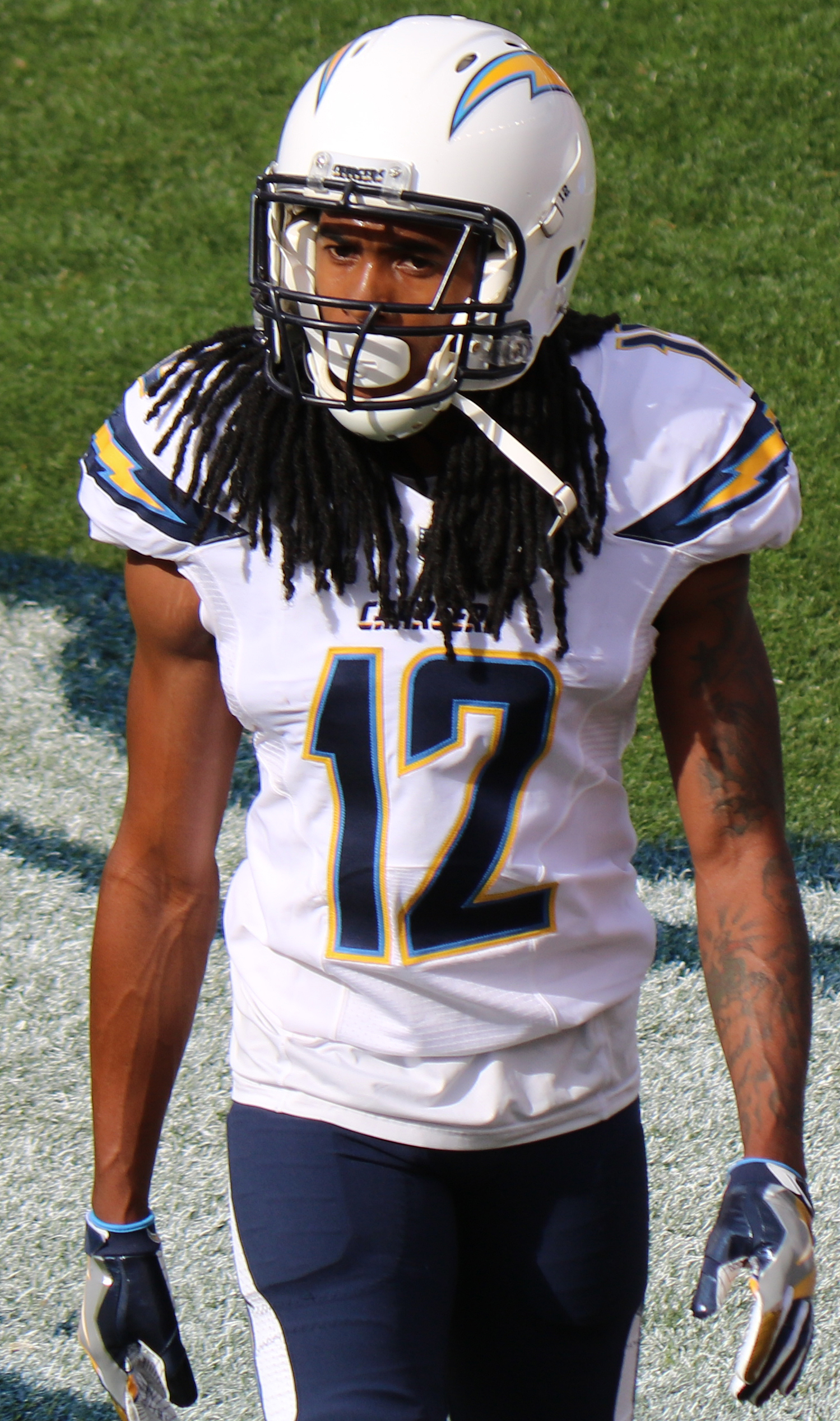
- Benjamin with the San Diego Chargers in 2016

No. 80, 11, 12, 17
- Positions: Wide receiver, return specialist

Personal information
- Born: December 29, 1989 (age 36); Pahokee, Florida, U.S.
- Listed height: 5 ft 10 in (1.78 m)
- Listed weight: 175 lb (79 kg)

Career information
- High school: Glades Central (Belle Glade, Florida)
- College: Miami (FL) (2008–2011)
- NFL draft: 2012: 4th round, 100th overall pick

Career history
- Cleveland Browns (2012–2015); San Diego / Los Angeles Chargers (2016–2019); San Francisco 49ers (2020–2021)

Career NFL statistics
- Receptions: 208
- Receiving yards: 3,143
- Receiving touchdowns: 19
- Return yards: 1,745
- Return touchdowns: 4
- Stats at Pro Football Reference

Travis Jayvinski Benjamin (born December 29, 1989) is an American former professional football player who was a wide receiver in the National Football League (NFL). He played college football for the Miami Hurricanes. He was selected by the Cleveland Browns in the fourth round of the 2012 NFL draft.

== Early life ==
Benjamin attended Glades Central High School in Belle Glade, Florida, and played on the football team. He played on the state championship team as a junior and was a contributing factor to their success in the following season; finishing with eight receiving touchdowns as a senior. Was the 21st-ranked wide receiver by ESPN and 144th overall in the Class of 2008. During the 2008 Muck Bowl against rival Pahokee High School, Benjamin was covered by Janoris Jenkins and was able to make a touchdown reception.

In addition to playing football, Benjamin ran for the Glades Central track team. He competed in the 100 meters and long jump. He ran personal season bests of 10.42 seconds in the 100 meters and 6.97 meters in the long jump. He placed fourth in both the 100 meters and long jump at the 2A state meet in 2008. He also led his team to a 2A state runner-up finish in his junior year.

In 2009, Benjamin ran a season-best time of 6.40 seconds in the 55 meters at the Tom Jones Invitational. In the 60 meters, he ran a season-best time of 6.90 seconds in the preliminary round of the Texas A&M Invitational.

== College career ==
Benjamin played college football for the Miami Hurricanes for four seasons from 2008 to 2011. As a freshman, he had 18 receptions for 293 receiving yards in 11 games. As a sophomore, he had 29 receptions for 501 yards and 4 touchdowns in 11 games. His best game came in the season opener against Florida State with four receptions for 128 yards and a touchdown. As a junior, he had 43 receptions for 743 yards and three touchdowns in 13 games. As a senior, he had 41 receptions for 609 yards and three touchdowns in 11 games.

In 2010, Benjamin joined Miami's indoor track team. He placed fourth in the ACC Championships in the 60 meters with a season-best time of 6.74 seconds. He ran the team's three fastest times on the season in the 60 meters.

Competing for the outdoor track team, Benjamin earned All-ACC honors, placing third in the 100 meters at the ACC Championships, with a time of 10.40 seconds, the fastest time of any Miami sprinter on the season. He ran the second leg of the 4 × 100 meter relay that advanced to the NCAA semifinals, that ran a season-best time of 39.57 seconds at the NCAA quarter finals, setting a school record, and placed fifth at the Penn Relays with a time of 40.35 seconds.

== Professional career ==
=== Pre-draft ===
Benjamin was one of 47 collegiate wide receivers to attend the NFL Scouting Combine in Indianapolis, Indiana. He tied Stanford's Chris Owusu and Georgia Tech's Stephen Hill for the best 40-yard dash time among all wide receivers at the combine. He completed the majority of drills, but skipped the short shuttle and three-cone due to a leg cramp. On March 8, 2012, Benjamin attended Miami's pro day and performed the short shuttle, three-cone drill, and positional drills. 66 team representatives and scouts from the NFL and CFL attended, including Pittsburgh Steelers' head coach Mike Tomlin. At the conclusion of the pre-draft process, Benjamin was projected to be a third or fourth round draft pick by the majority of NFL draft experts and scouts. He was ranked the 27th best wide receiver prospect by NFL.com and the 64th best wide receiver prospect in the draft by NFLDraftScout.com.

Pre-draft measurables
Height	Weight	Arm length	Hand span	40-yard dash	10-yard split	20-yard split	20-yard shuttle	Three-cone drill	Vertical jump	Broad jump	Bench press
5 ft 9 7/8 in (1.77 m)	172 lb (78 kg)	31 3/4 in (0.81 m)	8 3/4 in (0.22 m)	4.36 s	1.57 s	2.49 s	4.17 s	6.96 s	38 in (0.97 m)	9 ft 11 in (3.02 m)	14 reps
All measures are from NFL Combine, except 20 yd shuttle and Cone drill (UM Pro Day)

=== Cleveland Browns ===
==== 2012 ====
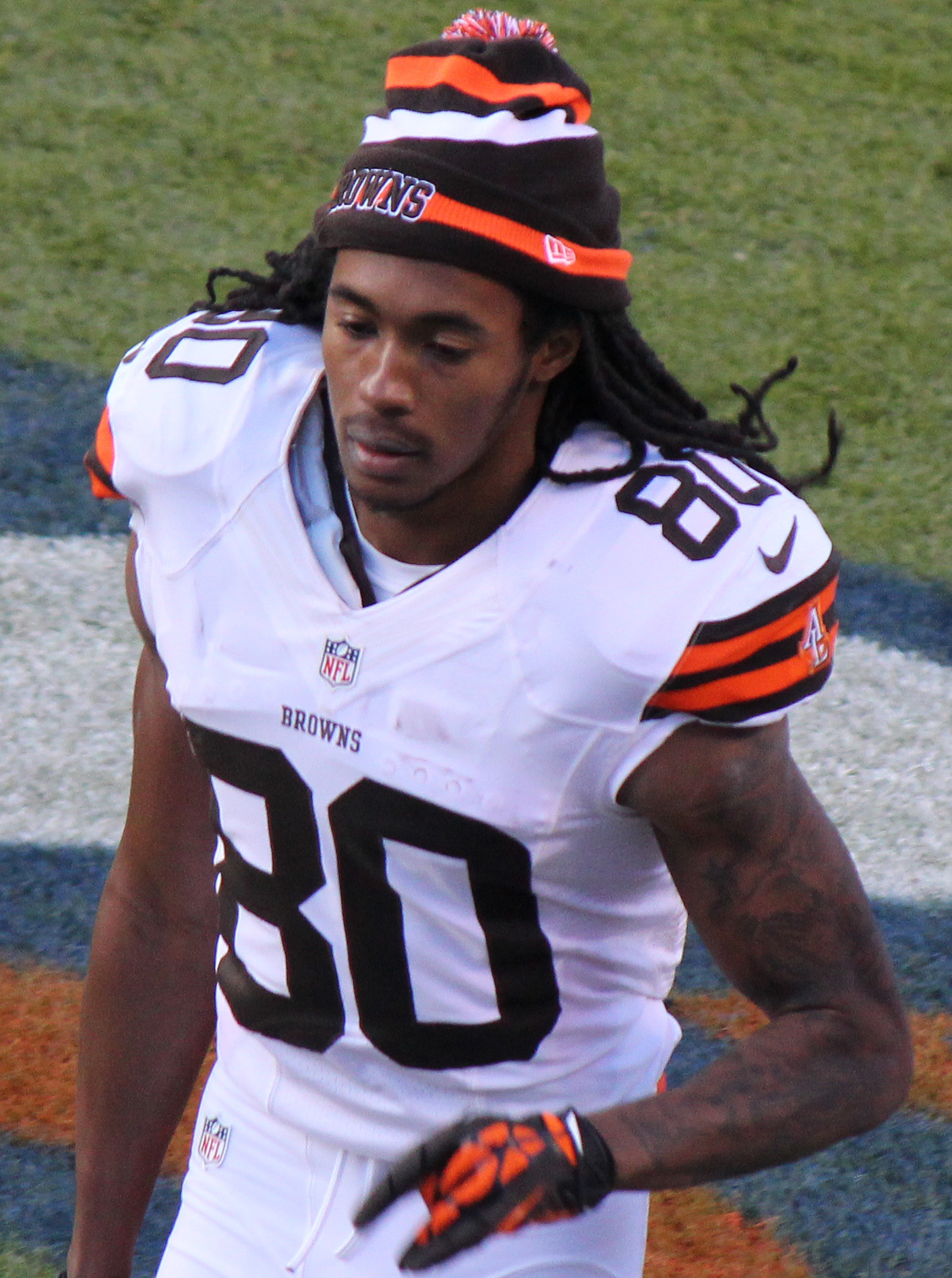
Benjamin with the Cleveland Browns in December 2012

The Cleveland Browns selected Benjamin in the fourth round with the 100th overall pick in the 2012 NFL draft. He was the 15th wide receiver selected in 2012.

On May 10, 2012, the Browns signed Benjamin to a four-year, $2.57 million contract that includes a signing bonus of $477,000.

Throughout training camp, he competed with Greg Little, Josh Cribbs, Josh Gordon, Jordan Norwood, Carlton Mitchell, Josh Cooper, and Rod Windsor for the role as the second wide receiver. Head coach Pat Shurmur named him the fourth wide receiver behind Mohamed Massaquoi, Greg Little, and Josh Gordon.

He made his professional regular season debut in the Cleveland Browns' season-opener against the Philadelphia Eagles and had one reception for 12-yards and a carry for 35-yards during their 17–16 loss. His first career reception came in the second quarter on a 12-yard pass by quarterback Brandon Weeden. The following week, he earned his first career start during the Browns' 34–27 loss at the Cincinnati Bengals. On September 23, 2012, Benjamin caught two passes for 44-yards and scored his first career touchdown in the Browns' 24–14 loss to the Buffalo Bills. His first career touchdown receptions came on a 22-yard pass from Brandon Weeden in the third quarter. The following week during a Week 4 matchup against the Baltimore Ravens, Benjamin had the first punt return of his career for a 40-yard gain and had two kick returns for a total of 47-yards during a 23–16 loss. In Week 14, he returned a punt for a 93-yard touchdown to set a franchise record for longest punt return by a rookie in Cleveland's 30–7 routing of the Kansas City Chiefs. On December 16, 2012, Benjamin made a season-long 69-yard touchdown reception in the Browns' 38–21 loss to the Washington Redskins. On December 30, 2012, he made a season-high four receptions for 43 receiving yards as Cleveland lost 24–10 at the Pittsburgh Steelers. He finished his rookie season with 18 receptions for 298 receiving yards and two touchdowns, while also carrying the ball six times for 66-yards. Benjamin was used sparingly as a returner with Josh Cribbs entrenched in the role and finished the 2012 season with three kick returns for 76-yards and three punt returns for 149-yards and a touchdown. Unfortunately, head coach Pat Shurmur was fired after the Cleveland Browns finished last in the AFC North with a 4–12 record.

==== 2013 ====
He entered an open competition for the vacant starting wide receiver role after the departure of Mohamed Massaquoi. Benjamin competed against Greg Little, Josh Gordon, Davone Bess, and Jordan Norwood. Head coach Rob Chudzinski named Benjamin the starting punt and kick returner after Josh Cribbs departed in free agency.

He started the Cleveland Browns' season-opener against the Miami Dolphins and caught three passes for 44-yards in their 23–10 loss. In Week 5 against the Bills in 2013, Benjamin returned a punt 79-yards for a touchdown en route to a 37–24 victory. On October 27, Benjamin suffered a torn ACL injury and missed the remainder of the season. He finished the 2013 season with five receptions for 105 receiving yards and had one carry for 45-yards in eight games and three starts. At the time of his injury, Benjamin was seventh in the league in punt return average.

==== 2014 ====
Head coach Mike Pettine was hired by the Browns for the 2014 season and held an open competition for the starting wide receiver role after Josh Gordon was suspended in August. Benjamin competed with newly acquired free agents Nate Burleson, Miles Austin, and Andrew Hawkins. He was named the third wide receiver and starting slot receiver behind Miles Austin and Andrew Hawkins.

Benjamin played in the Cleveland Browns' season-opener at the Pittsburgh Steelers and caught two passes for 20-yards and a touchdown during the 30–27 loss. His touchdown came in the fourth quarter on a nine-yard pass from quarterback Brian Hoyer to tie the game 27–27 before Steelers' kicker Shaun Suisham made a 47-yard field goal to win the game. On October 5, 2014, Benjamin made a season-high four receptions for 48-yards and caught two touchdown receptions during a 29–28 victory at the Tennessee Titans. He caught a 17-yard touchdown and a six-yard touchdown pass from Brian Hoyer in the fourth quarter to help lead the Browns in a comeback victory. It was the first multi-touchdown game of his career. During a Week 15 matchup against the Cincinnati Bengals, Benjamin had two punt returns for 24-yards and made his first career tackle on Bengal's linebacker Rey Maualuga after he intercepted a pass attempt by quarterback Johnny Manziel, intended for receiver Taylor Gabriel, and returned it 33-yards during the Browns 30–0 loss. He finished the 2014 season with 18 receptions for 314-yards and three touchdowns in 16 games and zero starts.

==== 2015 ====
Benjamin received competition for the starting wide receiver job after the Browns signed longtime veterans Dwayne Bowe and Brian Hartline after Miles Austin departed in free agency and Josh Gordon received a second suspension for the full 2015 season. Head coach Mike Pettine surprisingly named Benjamin the starting wide receiver for the first time of his career, along with Andrew Hawkins, after he had a productive training camp where he was called the "most improved teammate" by Donte Whitner. Although Bowe and Hartline were slated as the projected starters.

He started the Cleveland Browns' season-opener against the New York Jets and made three receptions for 89-yards and a touchdown as they lost 31–10. The following week, he caught three passes for 115 receiving yards and two touchdowns receptions in a 28–14 victory over the Tennessee Titans. Benjamin was responsible for three of the Browns' touchdowns during the game, catching a 60-yard and 50-yard touchdown pass from Johnny Manziel and returning a punt return for a 78-yard touchdown in the second quarter and was named the AFC Special Teams Player of the Week. During a Week 3 matchup against the Oakland Raiders, Benjamin made four receptions for 45-yards and one touchdown in their 27–20 loss. On October 18, 2015, Benjamin caught a season-high nine passes for a season-high 117 receiving yards as the Browns went on to lose 26–23 to the Denver Broncos. In Week 10, he made seven catches for 113-yards and caught his fifth touchdown reception of the season in a 30–9 loss at the Pittsburgh Steelers. Benjamin would finish the 2015 season with career-highs of 68 receptions for 966 receiving yards and five touchdown receptions in 15 starts and 16 games. Unfortunately, the Cleveland Browns finished last in the AFC North for the fourth consecutive season with a 3–13 record and head coach Mike Pettine was fired after the season.

Although the Cleveland Browns and Benjamin both were adamant about getting a new contract before the beginning of free agency and attempted to reach an agreement multiple times, discussions between both sides broke down and Benjamin entered the market.

=== San Diego/Los Angeles Chargers ===
==== 2016 ====
On March 9, 2016, the San Diego Chargers signed Benjamin to a four-year, $24 million contract with $13 million guaranteed and a signing bonus of $5 million.

Benjamin entered training camp slated as one of the starting wide receivers with Keenan Allen. Head coach Mike McCoy named him and Allen the official starters to begin the regular season.

He made his official San Diego Chargers' debut in their season-opener at the Kansas City Chiefs and caught seven passes for 32-yards in a 33–27 loss. The next week, Benjamin made six catches for 115 receiving yards and caught his first touchdown as a member of the Chargers on a 45-yard pass from Philip Rivers in their 38–14 win against the Jacksonville Jaguars. On October 9, 2016, he had seven receptions for a season-high 117 receiving yards in the Chargers' 34–31 loss at the Oakland Raiders. He was unable to play in the Chargers Week 10 game against the Miami Dolphins after sustaining a knee injury. Benjamin finished the 2016 season with 47 catches for 677 receiving yards and four touchdowns in eight starts and 14 games. It was reported that Benjamin dealt with multiple injuries throughout the season that limited his playing time and ability to start all 16 games.

==== 2017 ====
Benjamin entered the 2017 season under his fifth head coach in six seasons after the Los Angeles Chargers hired Anthony Lynn to be their new head coach. He entered training camp facing stiff competition for one of the starting wide receiver jobs after the Chargers drafted Clemson wide receiver Mike Williams seventh overall. He also had to contest with Tyrell Williams and Dontrelle Inman who both started for the Chargers throughout the 2016 season.

In the Los Angeles Chargers' season-opener against the Denver Broncos on Monday Night Football, Benjamin recorded three receptions for 43-yards and caught a 38-yard receiving touchdown from quarterback Philip Rivers in their 24–21 loss. On September 24, 2017, Benjamin caught five passes for a season-high 105 receiving yards in Los Angeles' 24–10 loss to the Kansas City Chiefs. In Week 7, Benjamin scored on a 64-yard punt return plus a 42-yard receiving touchdown in a 21–0 win over the Broncos, earning him AFC Special Teams Player of the Week. The next week, against the New England Patriots, Benjamin caught a season-high tying five passes for 64-yards and a touchdown, but muffed a punt at the Chargers' 8-yard line and then retreated into his own end zone, where he was tackled; the result was a Patriots safety as the Chargers lost 21–13. CBS Sports went on to call it "one of the worst punt returns in NFL history." Overall, he finished the 2017 season with 34 receptions for 567 receiving yards and four touchdowns.

==== 2018 ====
In a crowded position group, Benjamin totaled 12 receptions for 186 receiving yards and a receiving touchdown in the 2018 season.

==== 2019 ====
On April 16, 2019, Benjamin signed a one-year contract extension with the Chargers through the 2020 season. He was placed on injured reserve on October 17, 2019, with a quad injury.

=== San Francisco 49ers ===
On April 3, 2020, Benjamin signed a one-year contract with the San Francisco 49ers. On August 5, 2020, Benjamin announced he would opt out of the 2020 season due to the COVID-19 pandemic.

On August 31, 2021, Benjamin was released by the 49ers and re-signed to the practice squad the next day. He was promoted to active roster on October 9, 2021.

== Career statistics ==
=== NFL ===
Legend
**Bold**	Career high

==== Regular season ====
Year	Team	Games		Receiving					
Year	Team	GP	GS	Tgt	Rec	Yds	Avg	Lng	TD
2012	CLE	14	3	37	18	298	16.6	**69**	2
2013	CLE	8	3	13	5	105	**21.0**	39	0
2014	CLE	**16**	0	46	18	314	17.4	43	3
2015	CLE	**16**	**15**	**125**	**68**	**966**	14.2	61	**5**
2016	SD	14	8	75	47	677	14.4	54	4
2017	LAC	**16**	3	62	34	567	16.7	62	4
2018	LAC	12	3	24	12	186	15.5	46	1
2019	LAC	5	2	16	6	30	5.0	13	0
2021	SF	10	0	5	0	0	0.0	0	0
		111	37	403	208	3,143	15.1	69	19

==== Playoffs ====
Year	Team	Games		Receiving					
Year	Team	GP	GS	Tgt	Rec	Yds	Avg	Lng	TD
2018	LAC	2	0	**5**	**3**	11	3.7	8	0
2021	SF	**3**	0	2	1	**17**	**17.0**	**17**	0
		5	0	7	4	28	7.0	17	0

=== College ===
Season	Team	Class	Receiving				Kickoff returns				Punt returns			
Season	Team	Class	Rec	Yds	Avg	TD	Ret	Yds	Avg	TD	Ret	Yds	Avg	TD
2008	Miami (FL)	FR	18	293	16.3	3	22	496	22.5	0	16	181	11.3	0
2009	Miami (FL)	SO	29	501	17.3	4	1	18	18.0	0	9	57	6.3	0
2010	Miami (FL)	JR	43	743	17.3	3	1	31	31.0	0	23	106	4.6	1
2011	Miami (FL)	SR	41	609	14.9	3	25	592	23.7	0	11	121	11.0	0
Career			131	2,146	16.4	13	49	1,137	23.2	0	58	475	8.2	1
