= 2016 San Diego Chargers season =

57th season in franchise history, final one in San Diego

- Owner: Alex Spanos
- General manager: Tom Telesco
- Head coach: Mike McCoy
- Home stadium: Qualcomm Stadium

Results
- Record: 5–11
- Division place: 4th AFC West
- Playoffs: Did not qualify
- All-Pros: 1: CB Casey Hayward (2nd team)
- Pro Bowlers: 3: RB Melvin Gordon; CB Casey Hayward; QB Philip Rivers

The 2016 season was the San Diego Chargers' 47th in the National Football League (NFL), their 57th overall, their 56th and final season in San Diego, California, and their fourth and final season under head coach Mike McCoy.

Due to the age of Qualcomm Stadium, there was speculation that the team would be relocating back to Los Angeles, where the franchise had played its first season in 1960. This followed a decision by the NFL to allow the St. Louis Rams to return to the Greater Los Angeles Area with a provision that the Chargers may relocate to Los Angeles as well. On January 4, 2016, the team filed a relocation application to the NFL along with the Rams and the Oakland Raiders releasing a statement and a video on the team's website. The league made its decision in a special meeting on January 12; it approved the Chargers' relocation if they chose to share SoFi Stadium with the Rams (the Raiders-Chargers proposal did not receive enough support from the league as a whole to proceed, prompting the Raiders to back out). On January 29, 2016, the Chargers announced they would remain in San Diego for the 2016 season as negotiations with the city continued; the team also reached an agreement in principle to use the Rams' Los Angeles stadium should negotiations with the city of San Diego fail. On November 8, 2016, Measure C was voted down by voters 57% to 43%; and on January 12, 2017, the Chargers officially announced a move to Los Angeles, making 2016 their final season in San Diego.

This was the first time in nine seasons that Pro Bowler free safety Eric Weddle was not on the team, having departed via free agency to the Baltimore Ravens. Weddle had spent his entire career with the Chargers, starting with the 2007 NFL season.

This was also the first time the Chargers had suffered from consecutive losing seasons since 2000—2001.

On January 1, 2017, the Chargers fired head coach McCoy after four seasons.

== Offseason ==
=== Roster changes ===
==== Signed ====
Position	Player	2015 Team	Contract
WR	Travis Benjamin	Cleveland Browns	4 years, $26 million
CB	Casey Hayward	Green Bay Packers	3 years, $15.3 million
DT	Brandon Mebane	Seattle Seahawks	3 years, $13.5 million
FS	Dwight Lowery	Indianapolis Colts	3 years, $7.2 million
G	Matt Slauson	Chicago Bears	2 years, $4 million
TE	Jeff Cumberland	New York Jets	1 year, $840,000

==== Departures ====
Position	Player	2016 Team
FS	Eric Weddle	Baltimore Ravens
WR	Malcom Floyd	Retired
TE	Ladarius Green	Pittsburgh Steelers
CB	Patrick Robinson	Indianapolis Colts
P	Mike Scifres	Carolina Panthers
RB	Donald Brown	New England Patriots
ILB	Donald Butler	Miami Dolphins

== NFL draft ==
2016 San Diego Chargers draft
Round	Pick	Player	Position	College	Notes
1	3	Joey Bosa *	DE	Ohio St	
2	35	Hunter Henry	TE	Arkansas	
3	66	Max Tuerk	C	USC	
4	102	Joshua Perry	LB	Ohio St	
5	175	Jatavis Brown	LB	Akron	Compensatory
6	179	Drew Kaser	P	Texas A&M	
6	198	Derek Watt	FB	Wisconsin	
7	224	Donavon Clark	G	Michigan St	
Made roster † Pro Football Hall of Fame * Made at least one Pro Bowl during career

Notes

- The Chargers traded their 2016 fifth-round selection, along with their 2015 first- and fourth-round selections to the San Francisco 49ers in exchange for the 49ers' 2015 first-round selection.
- The Chargers acquired an additional sixth-round selection in a trade that sent guard Jeremiah Sirles to the Minnesota Vikings.
- As the result of a negative differential of free agent signings and departures that the Chargers experienced during the 2015 free agency period, the team received one compensatory selection for the 2016 draft in the fifth round. Free agent transactions that occurred after May 12, 2015, did not impact the team's formula for determining compensatory selections for the 2016 draft.

== Staff ==
2016 San Diego Chargers staff
Front office: Owner – Alex Spanos; Minority owner – George Pernicano; Chairman/president – Dean Spanos; Executive vice president – Michael Spanos; CEO/president – Business Operations – A. G. Spanos; General manager – Tom Telesco; President – Football Operations – John Spanos; Executive vice president of football administration/player finance – Ed McGuire; Senior executive – Randy Mueller; Director of pro scouting – Dennis Abraham; Senior director of pro personnel – Louis Clark; Director of player personnel – JoJo Wooden; Director of college scouting – Kevin Kelly; Head coaches: Head coach – Mike McCoy; Offensive coaches: Offensive coordinator – Ken Whisenhunt; Quarterbacks – Shane Steichen; Running backs – Ollie Wilson; Wide receivers – Nick Sirianni; Tight ends – John McNulty; Offensive line – Jeff Davidson; Assistant offensive line – Dave DeGuglielmo; Senior offensive assistant – Fred Graves; Offensive assistant – Tommy Rees; Special assistant to the head coach/offense – Mark Ridgley	Defensive coaches: Defensive coordinator – John Pagano; Defensive line – Giff Smith; Linebackers – Bob Babich; Assistant linebackers – Bobby King; Defensive backs – Ron Milus; Assistant defensive backs – Chris Harris; Defensive quality control – Chris Shula; Special teams coaches: Special teams coordinator – Craig Aukerman; Special teams assistant – Marquice Williams; Strength and conditioning: Strength and conditioning – Kent Johnston; Assistant strength and conditioning – Rick Lyle

== Final roster ==
2016 San Diego Chargers roster
Quarterbacks (QB): 10 Kellen Clemens; 17 Philip Rivers; Running backs (RB): 28 Melvin Gordon; 36 Ronnie Hillman; 34 Derek Watt FB; 44 Andre Williams; Wide receivers (WR): 12 Travis Benjamin; 89 Isaiah Burse; 88 Jeremy Butler; 81 Geremy Davis; 15 Dontrelle Inman; 16 Tyrell Williams; Tight ends (TE): 45 Asante Cleveland; 85 Antonio Gates; 86 Hunter Henry; 84 Sean McGrath	Offensive linemen (OL): 72 Joe Barksdale T; 78 Tyreek Burwell T; 77 King Dunlap T; 74 Orlando Franklin G; 76 D. J. Fluker G; 75 Chris Hairston T; 73 Spencer Pulley C; 68 Matt Slauson C; 62 Max Tuerk C; 79 Kenny Wiggins G; Defensive linemen (DL): 99 Joey Bosa DE; 90 Ryan Carrethers NT; 96 Kaleb Eulls DE; 94 Corey Liuget DE; 93 Darius Philon DE; 71 Damion Square NT	Linebackers (LB): 57 Jatavis Brown ILB; 51 Kyle Emanuel OLB; 59 Carlos Fields ILB; 54 Melvin Ingram OLB; 46 Chris Landrum OLB; 53 Joshua Perry ILB; 52 Denzel Perryman ILB; 56 Korey Toomer ILB; 58 Tourek Williams OLB; Defensive backs (DB): 37 Jahleel Addae SS; 26 Casey Hayward CB; 20 Dwight Lowery FS; 35 Robert McClain CB; 23 Dexter McCoil SS; 31 Adrian Phillips SS; 38 Trovon Reed CB; 25 Darrell Stuckey FS; 42 Trevor Williams CB; Special teams (ST): 2 Josh Lambo K; 8 Drew Kaser P; 47 Mike Windt LS	Practice squad: 67 Brett Boyko T; 41 Randall Evans CB; 33 Gus Johnson RB; 49 Mike Lee CB; 40 Chris McCain OLB; 30 Adrian McDonald S; 83 Jake McGee TE; 70 Chuka Ndulue NT; 7 Dom Williams WR; Reserve: 13 Keenan Allen WR (IR); 97 Jeremiah Attaochu OLB (IR); 91 Zamir Carlis DE (IR); 63 Donavon Clark G (IR); 87 Jeff Cumberland TE (IR); 48 Nick Dzubnar ILB (IR); 27 Kenneth Farrow RB (IR); 24 Brandon Flowers CB (IR); 59 Brock Hekking OLB (IR); 81 Javontee Herndon WR (IR); 11 Stevie Johnson WR (IR); 70 Tyler Johnstone T (IR); 98 Sean Lissemore NT (IR); 29 Craig Mager CB (IR); -- Dexter McCluster RB (NF-Inj.); 92 Brandon Mebane NT; 43 Branden Oliver RB (IR); 95 Tenny Palepoi DE (Susp.); 91 Caraun Reid DE (IR); 50 Manti Te'o ILB (IR); 22 Jason Verrett CB (IR); 39 Danny Woodhead RB (IR); Rookies in italics 53 active, 22 reserve, 9 practice squad

== Schedule ==
=== Preseason ===
Week	Date	Opponent	Result	Record	Venue	Recap
1	August 13	at Tennessee Titans	**L** 10–27	0–1	Nissan Stadium	Recap
2	August 19	Arizona Cardinals	**W** 19–3	1–1	Qualcomm Stadium	Recap
3	August 28	at Minnesota Vikings	**L** 10–23	1–2	U.S. Bank Stadium	Recap
4	September 1	San Francisco 49ers	**L** 21–31	1–3	Qualcomm Stadium	Recap

=== Regular season ===
Week	Date	Opponent	Result	Record	Venue	Recap
1	September 11	at **Kansas City Chiefs**	**L** 27–33 (OT)	0–1	Arrowhead Stadium	Recap
2	September 18	Jacksonville Jaguars	**W** 38–14	1–1	Qualcomm Stadium	Recap
3	September 25	at Indianapolis Colts	**L** 22–26	1–2	Lucas Oil Stadium	Recap
4	October 2	New Orleans Saints	**L** 34–35	1–3	Qualcomm Stadium	Recap
5	October 9	at **Oakland Raiders**	**L** 31–34	1–4	Oakland Alameda Coliseum	Recap
6	October 13	**Denver Broncos**	**W** 21–13	2–4	Qualcomm Stadium	Recap
7	October 23	at Atlanta Falcons	**W** 33–30 (OT)	3–4	Georgia Dome	Recap
8	October 30	at **Denver Broncos**	**L** 19–27	3–5	Sports Authority Field at Mile High	Recap
9	November 6	Tennessee Titans	**W** 43–35	4–5	Qualcomm Stadium	Recap
10	November 13	Miami Dolphins	**L** 24–31	4–6	Qualcomm Stadium	Recap
11	Bye					
12	November 27	at Houston Texans	**W** 21–13	5–6	NRG Stadium	Recap
13	December 4	Tampa Bay Buccaneers	**L** 21–28	5–7	Qualcomm Stadium	Recap
14	December 11	at Carolina Panthers	**L** 16–28	5–8	Bank of America Stadium	Recap
15	December 18	**Oakland Raiders**	**L** 16–19	5–9	Qualcomm Stadium	Recap
16	December 24	at Cleveland Browns	**L** 17–20	5–10	FirstEnergy Stadium	Recap
17	January 1	**Kansas City Chiefs**	**L** 27–37	5–11	Qualcomm Stadium	Recap

Note: Intra-division opponents are in bold text.

=== Game summaries ===
==== Week 1: at Kansas City Chiefs ====
Week One: San Diego Chargers at Kansas City Chiefs – Game summary

Quarter	1	2	3	4	OT	Total
Chargers	7	14	3	3	0	**27**
**Chiefs**	3	0	7	17	6	**33**

at Arrowhead Stadium, Kansas City, Missouri

- Date: September 11
- Game time: 12:00 p.m. CDT/10:00 a.m. PDT
- Game weather: 74 °F (23 °C), sunny
- Game attendance: 73,238
- Referee: Jerome Boger
- TV announcers (CBS): Kevin Harlan and Rich Gannon
- Recap, Gamebook

Game information

**First quarter**

- KC – Cairo Santos 47-yard field goal, 11:51. Chiefs 3–0. **Drive: 7 plays, 46 yards, 3:09.**
- SD – Melvin Gordon 1-yard run (Josh Lambo kick), 8:27. Chargers 7–3. **Drive: 6 plays, 75 yards, 3:24.**

**Second quarter**

- SD – Melvin Gordon 6-yard run (Josh Lambo kick), 11:51. Chargers 14–3. **Drive: 13 plays, 80 yards, 6:51.**
- SD – Danny Woodhead 4-yard pass from Philip Rivers (Josh Lambo kick), 7:54. Chargers 21–3. **Drive: 6 plays, 38 yards, 3:32.**

**Third quarter**

- SD – Josh Lambo 29-yard field goal, 6:02. Chargers 24–3. **Drive: 9 plays, 34 yards, 4:00.**
- KC – Tyreek Hill 9-yard pass from Alex Smith (Cairo Santos kick), 2:47. Chargers 24–10. **Drive: 7 plays, 75 yards, 3:15.**

**Fourth quarter**

- SD – Josh Lambo 28-yard field goal, 13:24. Chargers 27–10. **Drive: 9 plays, 65 yards, 4:23.**
- KC – Jeremy Maclin 19-yard pass from Alex Smith (Cairo Santos kick), 9:18. Chargers 27–17. **Drive: 7 plays, 56 yards, 2:02.**
- KC – Cairo Santos 33-yard field goal, 3:09. Chargers 27–20. **Drive: 12 plays, 62 yards, 3:40.**
- KC – Spencer Ware 5-yard run (Cairo Santos kick), 1:03. Tied 27–27. **Drive: 4 plays, 42 yards, 0:46.**

**Overtime**

- KC – Alex Smith 2-yard run, 9:53. Chiefs 33–27. **Drive: 10 plays, 70 yards, 5:07.**

**Top passers**

- SD – Philip Rivers – 25/36, 243 yards, TD
- KC – Alex Smith – 34/48, 363 yards, 2 TD, INT

**Top rushers**

- SD – Danny Woodhead – 16 rushes, 89 yards
- KC – Spencer Ware – 11 rushes, 70 yards, TD

**Top receivers**

- SD – Tyrell Williams – 2 receptions, 71 yards
- KC – Spencer Ware – 7 receptions, 129 yards

Leading 21–3 at halftime, the Chargers blew their lead, scoring only six more points by field goals. Kansas City rallied with 24 unanswered points, forcing overtime, where the Chiefs won the season's opening game.

==== Week 2: vs. Jacksonville Jaguars ====
Week Two: Jacksonville Jaguars at San Diego Chargers – Game summary

Quarter	1	2	3	4	Total
Jaguars	0	0	0	14	**14**
**Chargers**	7	14	14	3	**38**

at Qualcomm Stadium, San Diego, California

- Date: September 18
- Game time: 1:25 p.m. PDT
- Game weather: 82 °F (28 °C), sunny
- Game attendance: 52,165
- Referee: Carl Cheffers
- TV announcers (CBS): Tom McCarthy and Adam Archuleta
- Recap, Gamebook

Game information

**First quarter**

- SD – Melvin Gordon 3-yard run (Josh Lambo kick), 10:14. Chargers 7–0. **Drive: 8 plays, 75 yards, 4:46.**

**Second quarter**

- SD – Travis Benjamin 6-yard pass from Philip Rivers (Josh Lambo kick), 14:54. Chargers 14–0. **Drive: 7 plays, 34 yards, 3:34.**
- SD – Antonio Gates 2-yard pass from Philip Rivers (Josh Lambo kick), 9:54. Chargers 21–0. **Drive: 5 plays, 56 yards, 2:11.**

**Third quarter**

- SD – Tyrell Williams 44-yard pass from Philip Rivers (Josh Lambo kick), 10:54. Chargers 28–0. **Drive: 3 plays, 55 yards, 1:33.**
- SD – Travis Benjamin 45-yard pass from Philip Rivers (Josh Lambo kick), 2:48. Chargers 35–0. **Drive: 7 plays, 93 yards, 4:18.**

**Fourth quarter**

- JAX – Marcedes Lewis 4-yard pass from Blake Bortles (Jason Myers kick), 12:54. Chargers 35–7. **Drive: 12 plays, 75 yards, 4:54.**
- SD – Josh Lambo 25-yard field goal, 7:00. Chargers 38–7. **Drive: 11 plays, 36 yards, 5:54.**
- JAX – Corey Grant 15-yard pass from Blake Bortles (Jason Myers kick), 1:04. Chargers 38–14. **Drive: 9 plays, 60 yards, 2:30.**

**Top passers**

- JAX – Blake Bortles – 31/50, 329 yards, 2 TD, 2 INT
- SD – Philip Rivers – 17/24, 220 yards, 4 TD

**Top rushers**

- JAX – Blake Bortles – 3 rushes, 34 yards
- SD – Melvin Gordon – 24 rushes, 102 yards, TD

**Top receivers**

- JAX – Marqise Lee – 5 receptions, 75 yards
- SD – Travis Benjamin – 6 receptions, 115 yards, 2 TD

Already without Keenan Allen for the entire season, running back Danny Woodhead suffered a torn ACL, putting him out for the season. Nevertheless, the Chargers went on to burn the Jaguars, winning 38–14, and with that they went to 1–1.

==== Week 3: at Indianapolis Colts ====
Week Three: San Diego Chargers at Indianapolis Colts – Game summary

Quarter	1	2	3	4	Total
Chargers	0	13	6	3	**22**
**Colts**	10	3	7	6	**26**

at Lucas Oil Stadium, Indianapolis, Indiana

- Date: September 25
- Game time: 4:25 p.m. EDT/1:25 p.m. PDT
- Game weather: Played indoors (retractable roof closed)
- Game attendance: 64,747
- Referee: Ronald Torbert
- TV announcers (CBS): Kevin Harlan and Rich Gannon
- Recap, Gamebook

Game information

**First quarter**

- IND – Adam Vinatieri 38-yard field goal, 8:53. Colts 3–0. **Drive: 11 plays, 58 yards, 6:07.**
- IND – Frank Gore 6-yard run (Adam Vinatieri kick), 3:39. Colts 10–0. **Drive: 9 plays, 85 yards, 3:25.**

**Second quarter**

- SD – Josh Lambo 42-yard field goal, 14:51. Colts 10–3. **Drive: 10 plays, 50 yards, 3:48.**
- SD – Josh Lambo 34-yard field goal, 14:04. Colts 10–6. **Drive: 4 plays, −10 yards, 0:32.**
- IND – Adam Vinatieri 33-yard field goal, 6:25. Colts 13–6. **Drive: 11 plays, 60 yards, 7:39.**
- SD – Caraun Reid 61-yard fumble return (Josh Lambo kick), 0:55. Tied 13–13.

**Third quarter**

- SD – Melvin Gordon 1-yard run (kick blocked), 8:23. Chargers 19–13. **Drive: 12 plays, 80 yards, 6:37.**
- IND – Robert Turbin 1-yard run (Adam Vinatieri kick), 2:39. Colts 20–19. **Drive: 10 plays, 75 yards, 5:44.**

**Fourth quarter**

- SD – Josh Lambo 27-yard field goal, 7:34. Chargers 22–20. **Drive: 9 plays, 73 yards, 4:25.**
- IND – T. Y. Hilton 63-yard pass from Andrew Luck (pass failed), 1:17. Colts 26–22. **Drive: 6 plays, 83 yards, 1:12.**

**Top passers**

- SD – Philip Rivers – 26/39, 330 yards
- IND – Andrew Luck – 24/37, 331 yards, TD, INT

**Top rushers**

- SD – Melvin Gordon – 16 rushes, 35 yards, TD
- IND – Frank Gore – 21 rushes, 82 yards, TD

**Top receivers**

- SD – Tyrell Williams – 6 receptions, 69 yards
- IND – T. Y. Hilton – 8 receptions, 174 yards, TD

With a stunning loss on a 63-yard Colts touchdown pass to T.Y. Hilton with 1:17 to play, the Chargers' record fell to 1–2.

==== Week 4: vs. New Orleans Saints ====
Week Four: New Orleans Saints at San Diego Chargers – Game summary

Quarter	1	2	3	4	Total
**Saints**	7	7	7	14	**35**
Chargers	7	17	0	10	**34**

at Qualcomm Stadium, San Diego, California

- Date: October 2
- Game time: 1:25 p.m. PDT
- Game weather: 74 °F (23 °C), fair
- Game attendance: 60,641
- Referee: Walt Coleman
- TV announcers (Fox): Chris Myers, Ronde Barber and Jennifer Hale
- Recap, Gamebook

Game information

**First quarter**

- NO – Mark Ingram II 1-yard run (Wil Lutz kick), 10:32. Saints 7–0. **Drive: 11 plays, 75 yards, 4:28.**
- SD – Hunter Henry 20-yard pass from Philip Rivers (Josh Lambo kick), 1:10. Tied 7–7. **Drive: 7 plays, 62 yards, 3:30.**

**Second quarter**

- NO – John Kuhn 4-yard pass from Drew Brees (Wil Lutz kick), 9:20. Saints 14–7. **Drive: 14 plays, 75 yards, 6:50.**
- SD – Dontrelle Inman 57-yard pass from Philip Rivers (Josh Lambo kick), 7:04. Tied 14–14. **Drive: 4 plays, 75 yards, 2:16.**
- SD – Josh Lambo 30-yard field goal, 4:50. Chargers 17–14. **Drive: 5 plays, 29 yards, 2:05.**
- SD – Melvin Gordon 1-yard run (Josh Lambo kick), 0:13. Chargers 24–14. **Drive: 11 plays, 47 yards, 2:14.**

**Third quarter**

- NO – John Kuhn 1-yard run (Wil Lutz kick), 9:00. Chargers 24–21. **Drive: 9 plays, 48 yards, 4:18.**

**Fourth quarter**

- SD – Melvin Gordon 1-yard run (Josh Lambo kick), 12:15. Chargers 31–21. **Drive: 14 plays, 74 yards, 6:28.**
- SD – Josh Lambo 47-yard field goal, 8:39. Chargers 34–21. **Drive: 6 plays, −3 yards, 2:48.**
- NO – Michael Thomas 5-yard pass from Drew Brees (Wil Lutz kick), 4:50. Chargers 34–28. **Drive: 4 plays, 13 yards, 1:50.**
- NO – John Kuhn 1-yard run (Wil Lutz kick), 1:57. Saints 35–34. **Drive: 7 plays, 31 yards, 2:45.**

**Top passers**

- NO – Drew Brees – 23/36, 207 yards, 2 TD, 2 INT
- SD – Philip Rivers – 28/43, 321 yards, 2 TD, INT

**Top rushers**

- NO – Mark Ingram II – 18 rushes, 56 yards, TD
- SD – Melvin Gordon – 19 rushes, 36 yards, 2 TD

**Top receivers**

- NO – Mark Ingram II – 6 receptions, 49 yards
- SD – Dontrelle Inman – 7 receptions, 120 yards, TD

Ahead 34–21, the Chargers gave up two Drew Brees touchdown passes in the final five minutes and fell to 1–3.

==== Week 5: at Oakland Raiders ====
Week Five: San Diego Chargers at Oakland Raiders – Game summary

Quarter	1	2	3	4	Total
Chargers	0	10	14	7	**31**
**Raiders**	3	6	18	7	**34**

at Oakland Alameda Coliseum, Oakland, California

- Date: October 9
- Game time: 1:25 p.m. PDT
- Game weather: 75 °F (24 °C), sunny
- Game attendance: 54,275
- Referee: Gene Steratore
- TV announcers (CBS): Tom McCarthy and Adam Archuleta
- Recap, Gamebook

Game information

**First quarter**

- OAK – Sebastian Janikowski 20-yard field goal, 4:00. Raiders 3–0. **Drive: 16 plays, 87 yards, 8:01.**

**Second quarter**

- SD – Tyrell Williams 29-yard pass from Philip Rivers (Josh Lambo kick), 13:07. Chargers 7–3. **Drive: 8 plays, 60 yards, 3:20.**
- OAK – Sebastian Janikowski 26-yard field goal, 7:13. Chargers 7–6. **Drive: 11 plays, 67 yards, 5:54.**
- SD – Josh Lambo 36-yard field goal, 4:24. Chargers 10–6. **Drive: 5 plays, 57 yards, 2:249.**
- OAK – Sebastian Janikowski 56-yard field goal, 0:00. Chargers 10–9. **Drive: 4 plays, 6 yards, 1:39.**

**Third quarter**

- SD – Melvin Gordon 18-yard pass from Philip Rivers (Josh Lambo kick), 12:31. Chargers 17–9. **Drive: 4 plays, 75 yards, 2:29.**
- OAK – Amari Cooper 64-yard pass from Derek Carr (Sebastian Janikowski kick), 11:25. Chargers 17–16. **Drive: 5 plays, 75 yards, 1:06.**
- SD – Hunter Henry 1-yard pass from Philip Rivers (Josh Lambo kick), 10:10. Chargers 24–16. **Drive: 3 plays, 75 yards, 1:15.**
- OAK – Sebastian Janikowski 48-yard field goal, 4:41. Chargers 24–19. **Drive: 10 plays, 45 yards, 5:29.**
- OAK – Michael Crabtree 21-yard pass from Derek Carr (Derek Carr–Amari Cooper pass), 1:09. Raiders 27–24. **Drive: 6 plays, 38 yards, 2:45.**

**Fourth quarter**

- OAK – Jamize Olawale 1-yard run (Sebastian Janikowski kick), 12:51. Raiders 34–24. **Drive: 4 plays, 32 yards, 2:09.**
- SD – Antonio Gates 4-yard pass from Philip Rivers (Josh Lambo kick), 6:21. Raiders 34–31. **Drive: 12 plays, 75 yards, 6:30.**

**Top passers**

- SD – Philip Rivers – 21/30, 359 yards, 4 TD, 2 INT
- OAK – Derek Carr – 25/40, 317 yards, 2 TD, INT

**Top rushers**

- SD – Melvin Gordon – 16 rushes, 69 yards
- OAK – Jalen Richard – 8 rushes, 31 yards

**Top receivers**

- SD – Tyrell Williams – 5 receptions, 117 yards, TD
- OAK – Amari Cooper – 6 receptions, 138 yards, TD

With their third straight loss to the Raiders, the Chargers fell to 1–4.

==== Week 6: vs. Denver Broncos ====
Week Six: Denver Broncos at San Diego Chargers – Game summary

Quarter	1	2	3	4	Total
Broncos	0	3	0	10	**13**
**Chargers**	7	3	9	2	**21**

at Qualcomm Stadium, San Diego, California

- Date: October 13
- Game time: 5:25 p.m. PDT
- Game weather: 70 °F (21 °C), fair
- Game attendance: 58,904
- Referee: Craig Wrolstad
- TV announcers (CBS/NFLN/Twitter): Jim Nantz, Phil Simms and Tracy Wolfson
- Recap, Gamebook

Game information

**First quarter**

- SD – Hunter Henry 5-yard pass from Philip Rivers (Josh Lambo kick), 8:00. Chargers 7–0. **Drive: 12 plays, 75 yards, 7:00.**

**Second quarter**

- SD – Josh Lambo 37-yard field goal, 10:35. Chargers 10–0. **Drive: 18 plays, 75 yards, 10:03.**
- DEN – Brandon McManus 29-yard field goal, 5:40. Chargers 10–3. **Drive: 4 plays, 0 yards, 2:08.**

**Third quarter**

- SD – Josh Lambo 21-yard field goal, 10:41. Chargers 13–3. **Drive: 5 plays, 51 yards, 2:10.**
- SD – Josh Lambo 31-yard field goal, 7:15. Chargers 16–3. **Drive: 4 plays, 7 yards, 2:00.**
- SD – Josh Lambo 32-yard field goal, 3:31. Chargers 19–3. **Drive: 8 plays, 50 yards, 2:51.**

**Fourth quarter**

- SD – Penalty on Russell Okung enforced in the end zone for a safety 11:59. Chargers 21–3.
- DEN – Bennie Fowler 5-yard pass from Trevor Siemian (Brandon McManus kick), 8:08. Chargers 21–10. **Drive: 11 plays, 51 yards, 3:51.**
- DEN – Brandon McManus 46-yard field goal, 0:27. Chargers 21–13. **Drive: 11 plays, 56 yards, 2:36.**

**Top passers**

- DEN – Trevor Siemian – 30/50, 230 yards, TD
- SD – Philip Rivers – 18/29, 178 yards, TD

**Top rushers**

- DEN – Devontae Booker – 5 rushes, 46 yards
- SD – Melvin Gordon – 27 rushes, 94 yards

**Top receivers**

- DEN – Emmanuel Sanders – 4 receptions, 40 yards
- SD – Hunter Henry – 6 receptions, 83 yards, TD

The Chargers wore Color Rush uniforms with shades of blue and yellow San Diego used from 1974 until 1984.

The team snapped a 3-game losing streak against the Broncos and improved to 2–4.

==== Week 7: at Atlanta Falcons ====
Week Seven: San Diego Chargers at Atlanta Falcons – Game summary

Quarter	1	2	3	4	OT	Total
**Chargers**	7	10	3	10	3	**33**
Falcons	6	21	0	3	0	**30**

at Georgia Dome, Atlanta

- Date: October 23
- Game time: 4:05 p.m. PDT/1:05 p.m. PDT
- Game weather: Played indoors (dome stadium)
- Game attendance: 69,832
- Referee: Bill Vinovich
- TV announcers (Fox): Sam Rosen, Daryl Johnston and Laura Okmin
- Recap, Gamebook

Game information

**First quarter**

- SD – Melvin Gordon 2-yard run (Josh Lambo kick), 10:55. Chargers 7–0. **Drive: 7 plays, 75 yards, 4:05.**
- ATL – Matt Bryant 42-yard field goal, 6:26. Chargers 7–3. **Drive: 10 plays, 51 yards, 4:29.**
- ATL – Matt Bryant 27-yard field goal, 2:34. Chargers 7–6. **Drive: 4 plays, 1 yard, 0:56.**

**Second quarter**

- SD – Josh Lambo 40-yard field goal, 13:29. Chargers 10–6. **Drive: 10 plays, 61 yards, 4:05.**
- ATL – Jacob Tamme 17-yard pass from Matt Ryan (Matt Bryant kick), 9:06. Falcons 13–10. **Drive: 7 plays, 75 yards, 4:23.**
- ATL – Tevin Coleman 30-yard run (Matt Bryant kick), 6:07. Falcons 20–10. **Drive: 4 plays, 50 yards, 1:49.**
- ATL – Adrian Clayborn 5-yard fumble return (Matt Bryant kick), 4:31. Falcons 27–10.
- SD – Melvin Gordon 3-yard run (Josh Lambo kick), 1:02. Falcons 27–17. **Drive: 7 plays, 75 yards, 3:29.**

**Third quarter**

- SD – Josh Lambo 37-yard field goal, 4:50. Falcons 27–20. **Drive: 8 plays, 50 yards, 3:15.**

**Fourth quarter**

- ATL – Matt Bryant 31-yard field goal, 13:23. Falcons 30–20. **Drive: 13 plays, 62 yards, 6:27.**
- SD – Melvin Gordon 5-yard pass from Philip Rivers (Josh Lambo kick), 5:59. Falcons 30–27. **Drive: 15 plays, 75 yards, 7:24.**
- SD – Josh Lambo 33-yard field goal, 0:18. Tied 30–30. **Drive: 12 plays, 50 yards, 3:14.**

**Overtime**

- SD – Josh Lambo 42-yard field goal, 9:01. Chargers 33–30. **Drive: 6 plays, 19 yards, 3:11.**

**Top passers**

- SD – Philip Rivers – 27/44, 371 yards, TD, INT
- ATL – Matt Ryan – 22/34, 273 yards, TD, INT

**Top rushers**

- SD – Melvin Gordon – 22 rushes, 68 yards, 2 TD
- ATL – Tevin Coleman – 8 rushes, 64 yards, TD

**Top receivers**

- SD – Tyrell Williams – 7 receptions, 140 yards
- ATL – Julio Jones – 9 receptions, 174 yards

The Chargers came into this game with a 1–8 all-time record against Atlanta, and this marked San Diego's first visit to Atlanta since 2004. The Falcons had built a 27–10 lead by the two-minute warning at the end of the first half, but the Chargers pulled them back and leveled the score at 30–30 with a 33-yard Josh Lambo field goal with 18 seconds left in regulation. Lambo then hit a 42-yard attempt in overtime to seal the win for the Chargers as they improved to 3–4.

==== Week 8: at Denver Broncos ====
Week Eight: San Diego Chargers at Denver Broncos – Game summary

Quarter	1	2	3	4	Total
Chargers	7	0	6	6	**19**
**Broncos**	3	7	7	10	**27**

at Sports Authority Field at Mile High, Denver, Colorado

- Date: October 30
- Game time: 2:05 p.m. MDT/1:05 p.m. PDT
- Game weather: 76 °F (24 °C), partly cloudy
- Game attendance: 76,756
- Referee: Tony Corrente
- TV announcers (CBS): Greg Gumbel, Trent Green and Jamie Erdahl
- Recap, Gamebook

Game information

**First quarter**

- DEN – Brandon McManus 28-yard field goal, 11:05. Broncos 3–0. **Drive: 9 plays, 65 yards, 3:55.**
- SD – Antonio Gates 7-yard pass from Philip Rivers (Josh Lambo kick), 7:24. Chargers 7–3. **Drive: 7 plays, 85 yards, 3:41.**

**Second quarter**

- DEN – Bradley Roby 49-yard interception return (Brandon McManus kick), 9:10. Broncos 10–7.

**Third quarter**

- DEN – Devontae Booker 3-yard run (Brandon McManus kick), 12:45. Broncos 17–7. **Drive: 2 plays, 10 yards, 0:45.**
- SD – Travis Benjamin 14-yard pass from Philip Rivers (kick blocked), 4:02. Broncos 17–13. **Drive: 13 plays, 98 yards, 7:42.**

**Fourth quarter**

- DEN – Juwan Thompson 1-yard run (Brandon McManus kick), 12:32. Broncos 24–13. **Drive: 13 plays, 75 yards, 6:30.**
- SD – Casey Hayward 24-yard interception return (pass failed), 8:02. Broncos 24–19.
- DEN – Brandon McManus 22-yard field goal, 5:19. Broncos 27–19. **Drive: 6 plays, 71 yards, 2:43.**

**Top passers**

- SD – Philip Rivers – 20/47, 267 yards, 2 TD, 3 INT
- DEN – Trevor Siemian – 20/38, 276 yards, INT

**Top rushers**

- SD – Melvin Gordon – 23 rushes, 111 yards
- DEN – Devontae Booker – 19 rushes, 54 yards, TD

**Top receivers**

- SD – Dontrelle Inman – 4 receptions, 72 yards
- DEN – Demaryius Thomas – 5 receptions, 79 yards

==== Week 9: vs. Tennessee Titans ====
Week Nine: Tennessee Titans at San Diego Chargers – Game summary

Quarter	1	2	3	4	Total
Titans	0	14	7	14	**35**
**Chargers**	9	10	14	10	**43**

at Qualcomm Stadium, San Diego, California

- Date: November 6
- Game time: 1:25 p.m. PST
- Game weather: 76 °F (24 °C), partly cloudy
- Game attendance: 52,281
- Referee: Brad Allen
- TV announcers (CBS): Kevin Harlan, Dan Fouts and Scott Kaplan
- Recap, Gamebook

Game information

**First quarter**

- SD – Antonio Gates 13-yard pass from Philip Rivers (kick failed, wide right), 10:02. Chargers 6–0. **Drive: 9 plays, 75 yards, 4:58.**
- SD – Josh Lambo 32-yard field goal, 4:11. Chargers 9–0. **Drive: 10 plays, 35 yards, 4:44.**

**Second quarter**

- SD – Tyrell Williams 6-yard pass from Philip Rivers (Josh Lambo kick), 14:18. Chargers 16–0. **Drive: 5 plays, 87 yards, 2:51.**
- TEN – Rishard Matthews 16-yard pass from Marcus Mariota (Ryan Succop kick), 11:14. Chargers 16–7. **Drive: 8 plays, 75 yards, 3:04.**
- SD – Josh Lambo 23-yard field goal, 1:32. Chargers 19–7. **Drive: 6 plays, 10 yards, 0:52.**
- TEN – Rishard Matthews 7-yard pass from Marcus Mariota (Ryan Succop kick), 0:14. Chargers 19–14. **Drive: 7 plays, 75 yards, 1:18.**

**Third quarter**

- TEN – Marcus Mariota 14-yard run (Ryan Succop kick), 12:19. Titans 21–19. **Drive: 9 plays, 75 yards, 2:41.**
- SD – Melvin Gordon 1-yard run (Josh Lambo kick), 5:28. Chargers 26–21. **Drive: 14 plays, 75 yards, 6:51.**
- SD – Dwight Lowery 36-yard fumble return (Josh Lambo kick), 2:31. Chargers 33–21.

**Fourth quarter**

- TEN – Delanie Walker 8-yard pass from Marcus Mariota (Ryan Succop kick), 9:51. Chargers 33–28. **Drive: 7 plays, 80 yards, 2:59.**
- SD – Josh Lambo 36-yard field goal, 6:05. Chargers 36–28. **Drive: 7 plays, 57 yards, 3:46.**
- SD – Brandon Flowers 33-yard interception return (Josh Lambo kick), 4:51. Chargers 43–28.
- TEN – DeMarco Murray 1-yard run (Ryan Succop kick), 2:45. Chargers 43–35. **Drive: 10 plays, 75 yards, 2:06.**

**Top passers**

- TEN – Marcus Mariota – 27/43, 313 yards, 3 TD, 2 INT
- SD – Philip Rivers – 24/33, 275 yards, 2 TD

**Top rushers**

- TEN – DeMarco Murray – 14 rushes, 51 yards, TD
- SD – Melvin Gordon – 32 rushes, 196 yards, TD

**Top receivers**

- TEN – Richard Matthews – 6 receptions, 63 yards, 2 TD
- SD – Antonio Gates – 5 receptions, 75 yards, TD

This turned out to be the Chargers last win in San Diego. They lost their last 4 games at Qualcomm Stadium.

==== Week 10: vs. Miami Dolphins ====
Week Ten: Miami Dolphins at San Diego Chargers – Game summary

Quarter	1	2	3	4	Total
**Dolphins**	0	7	14	10	**31**
Chargers	0	10	7	7	**24**

at Qualcomm Stadium, San Diego, California

- Date: November 13
- Game time: 1:05 p.m. PST
- Game weather: 85 °F (29 °C), sunny
- Game attendance: 55,107
- Referee: Terry McAulay
- TV announcers (CBS): Greg Gumbel, Trent Green and Jamie Erdahl
- Recap, Gamebook

Game information

**First quarter**

- No scoring plays

**Second quarter**

- SD – Josh Lambo 45-yard field goal, 14:51. Chargers 3–0. **Drive: 7 plays, 46 yards, 3:03.**
- SD – Antonio Gates 11-yard pass from Philip Rivers (Josh Lambo kick), 7:37. Chargers 10–0. **Drive: 9 plays, 80 yards, 4:53.**
- MIA – Kenny Stills 39-yard pass from Ryan Tannehill (Andrew Franks kick), 2:50. Chargers 10–7. **Drive: 9 plays, 74 yards, 4:47.**

**Third quarter**

- MIA – Damien Williams 2-yard run (Andrew Franks kick), 12:29. Dolphins 14–10. **Drive: 5 plays, 75 yards, 2:31.**
- SD – Hunter Henry 7-yard pass from Philip Rivers (Josh Lambo kick), 5:36. Chargers 17–14. **Drive: 12 plays, 75 yards, 6:53.**
- MIA – Damien Williams 18-yard pass from Ryan Tannehill (Andrew Franks kick), 1:43. Dolphins 21–17. **Drive: 8 plays, 75 yards, 3:53.**

**Fourth quarter**

- SD – Tyrell Williams 51-yard pass from Philip Rivers (Josh Lambo kick), 4:04. Chargers 24–21. **Drive: 4 plays, 58 yards, 1:02.**
- MIA – Andrew Franks 27-yard field goal, 2:57. Tied 24–24. **Drive: 5 plays, 66 yards, 1:07.**
- MIA – Kiko Alonso 60-yard interception return (Andrew Franks kick), 1:01. Dolphins 31–24.

**Top passers**

- MIA – Ryan Tannehill – 17/24, 240 yards, 2 TD
- SD – Philip Rivers – 23/44, 326 yards, 3 TD, 4 INT

**Top rushers**

- MIA – Jay Ajayi – 19 rushes, 79 yards
- SD – Melvin Gordon – 24 rushes, 70 yards

**Top receivers**

- MIA – DeVante Parker – 5 receptions, 103 yards
- SD – Tyrell Williams – 5 receptions, 125 yards, TD

Philip Rivers threw four fourth quarter interceptions in this game, including a crucial pick-6 with a minute remaining that was returned by Kiko Alonso.

With the loss, the Chargers went into their bye week at 4–6.

==== Week 12: at Houston Texans ====
Week Twelve: San Diego Chargers at Houston Texans – Game summary

Quarter	1	2	3	4	Total
**Chargers**	0	14	0	7	**21**
Texans	0	7	0	6	**13**

at NRG Stadium, Houston, Texas

- Date: November 27
- Game time: 12:00 p.m. CST/10:00 a.m. PST
- Game weather: Played indoors (retractable roof closed)
- Game attendance: 71,897
- Referee: Jeff Triplette
- TV announcers (CBS): Kevin Harlan and Rich Gannon
- Recap, Gamebook

Game information

**First quarter**

- No scoring plays

**Second quarter**

- HOU – Brock Osweiler 1-yard run (Nick Novak kick), 11:11. Texans 7–0. **Drive: 10 plays, 72 yards, 5:16.**
- SD – Dontrelle Inman 52-yard pass from Philip Rivers (Josh Lambo kick), 6:44. Tied 7–7. **Drive: 6 plays, 74 yards, 4:27.**
- SD – Tyrell Williams 21-yard pass from Philip Rivers (Josh Lambo kick), 1:54. Chargers 14–7. **Drive: 5 plays, 63 yards, 2:53.**

**Third quarter**

- No scoring plays

**Fourth quarter**

- HOU – Nick Novak 19-yard field goal, 14:09. Chargers 14–10. **Drive: 9 plays, 36 yards, 5:28.**
- SD – Hunter Henry 12-yard pass from Philip Rivers (Josh Lambo kick), 9:52. Chargers 21–10. **Drive: 7 plays, 75 yards, 4:17.**
- HOU – Nick Novak 45-yard field goal, 0:14. Chargers 21–13. **Drive: 9 plays, 60 yards, 2:03.**

**Top passers**

- SD – Philip Rivers – 22/30, 242 yards, 3 TD, INT
- HOU – Brock Osweiler – 22/37, 246 yards, 3 INT

**Top rushers**

- SD – Melvin Gordon – 17 rushes, 70 yards
- HOU – Lamar Miller – 19 rushes, 57 yards

**Top receivers**

- SD – Dontrelle Inman – 6 receptions, 119 yards, TD
- HOU – DeAndre Hopkins – 5 receptions, 70 yards

This proved to be the last win for the Chargers franchise while based in San Diego.

==== Week 13: vs. Tampa Bay Buccaneers ====
Week Thirteen: Tampa Bay Buccaneers at San Diego Chargers – Game summary

Quarter	1	2	3	4	Total
**Buccaneers**	7	0	10	11	**28**
Chargers	7	7	7	0	**21**

at Qualcomm Stadium, San Diego, California

- Date: December 4
- Game time: 1:25 p.m. PST
- Game weather: 72 °F (22 °C), sunny
- Game attendance: 53,832
- Referee: John Hussey
- TV announcers (Fox): Sam Rosen, David Diehl and Holly Sonders
- Recap, Gamebook

Game information

**First quarter**

- SD – Dontrelle Inman 35-yard pass from Philip Rivers (Josh Lambo kick), 11:03. Chargers 7–0. **Drive: 8 plays, 75 yards, 4:07.**
- TB – Doug Martin 2-yard run (Roberto Aguayo kick), 1:15. Tied 7–7. **Drive: 8 plays, 54 yards, 4:26.**

**Second quarter**

- SD – Melvin Gordon 2-yard run (Josh Lambo kick), 10:08. Chargers 14–7. **Drive: 11 plays, 61 yards, 6:04.**

**Third quarter**

- TB – Roberto Aguayo 27-yard field goal, 8:29. Chargers 14–10. **Drive: 13 plays, 66 yards, 6:35.**
- TB – Lavonte David 15-yard interception return (Roberto Aguayo kick), 4:32. Buccaneers 17–14.
- SD – Tyrell Williams 40-yard pass from Philip Rivers (Josh Lambo kick), 1:42. Chargers 21–17. **Drive: 5 plays, 75 yards, 2:52.**

**Fourth quarter**

- TB – Roberto Aguayo 35-yard field goal, 13:07. Chargers 21–20. **Drive: 8 plays, 59 yards, 3:30.**
- TB – Cameron Brate 12-yard touchdown pass from Jameis Winston (Jameis Winston–Mike Evans pass), 9:06. Buccaneers 28–21. **Drive: 4 plays, 54 yards, 2:14.**

**Top passers**

- TB – Jameis Winston – 20/30, 280 yards, TD, INT
- SD – Philip Rivers – 15/26, 225 yards, 2 TD, 2 INT

**Top rushers**

- TB – Melvin Gordon – 17 rushes, 84 yards, TD
- SD – Doug Martin – 17 rushes, 45 yards, TD

**Top receivers**

- TB – Cameron Brate – 6 receptions, 84 yards, TD
- SD – Melvin Gordon – 4 receptions, 54 yards

==== Week 14: at Carolina Panthers ====
Week Fourteen: San Diego Chargers at Carolina Panthers – Game summary

Quarter	1	2	3	4	Total
Chargers	0	7	9	0	**16**
**Panthers**	10	13	3	2	**28**

at Bank of America Stadium, Charlotte, North Carolina

- Date: December 11
- Game time: 1:00 p.m. EST/10:00 a.m. PST
- Game weather: 37 °F (3 °C), cloudy
- Game attendance: 73,856
- Referee: Ronald Torbert
- TV announcers (Fox): Sam Rosen, Brady Quinn and Holly Sonders
- Recap, Gamebook

Game information

**First quarter**

- CAR – Graham Gano 41-yard field goal, 10:19. Panthers 3–0. **Drive: 9 plays, 29 yards, 3:10.**
- CAR – Jonathan Stewart 1-yard run (Graham Gano kick), 1:48. Panthers 10–0. **Drive: 7 plays, 35 yards, 3:23.**

**Second quarter**

- CAR – Devin Funchess 6-yard pass from Cam Newton (Graham Gano kick), 11:12. Panthers 17–0. **Drive: 8 plays, 58 yards, 3:33.**
- CAR – Graham Gano 44-yard field goal, 5:23. Panthers 20–0. **Drive: 6 plays, 34 yards, 2:48.**
- CAR – Graham Gano 45-yard field goal, 3:49. Panthers 23–0. **Drive: 4 plays, 1 yard, 0:47.**
- SD – Hunter Henry 9-yard pass from Philip Rivers (Josh Lambo kick), 1:03. Panthers 23–7. **Drive: 9 plays, 75 yards, 2:46.**

**Third quarter**

- CAR – Graham Gano 23-yard field goal, 11:29. Panthers 26–7. **Drive: 9 plays, 70 yards, 3:31.**
- SD – Josh Lambo 32-yard field goal, 4:26. Panthers 26–10. **Drive: 14 plays, 61 yards, 7:03.**
- SD – Dontrelle Inman 19-yard pass from Philip Rivers (pass failed), 0:30. Panthers 26–16. **Drive: 5 plays, 66 yards, 2:08.**

**Fourth quarter**

- CAR – Philip Rivers sacked in the end zone by Mario Addison for a safety, 10:09. Panthers 28–16.

**Top passers**

- SD – Philip Rivers – 21/39, 236 yards, 2 TD, 3 INT
- CAR – Cam Newton – 10/27, 160 yards, TD, INT

**Top rushers**

- SD – Kenneth Farrow – 16 rushes, 55 yards
- CAR – Jonathan Stewart – 24 rushes, 66 yards, TD

**Top receivers**

- SD – Dontrelle Inman – 6 receptions, 71 yards, TD
- CAR – Greg Olsen – 4 receptions, 87 yards

==== Week 15: vs. Oakland Raiders ====
Week Fifteen: Oakland Raiders at San Diego Chargers – Game summary

Quarter	1	2	3	4	Total
**Raiders**	3	7	3	6	**19**
Chargers	7	3	6	0	**16**

at Qualcomm Stadium, San Diego, California

- Date: December 18
- Game time: 1:25 p.m. PST
- Game weather: 62 °F (17 °C), sunny
- Game attendance: 68,352
- Referee: John Parry
- TV announcers (CBS): Spero Dedes and Solomon Wilcots
- Recap, Gamebook

Game information

**First quarter**

- SD – Travis Benjamin 47-yard pass from Philip Rivers (Josh Lambo kick), 10:32. Chargers 7–0. **Drive: 8 plays, 91 yards, 4:28.**
- OAK – Sebastian Janikowski 35-yard field goal, 4:53. Chargers 7–3. **Drive: 11 plays, 44 yards, 5:39.**

**Second quarter**

- SD – Josh Lambo 35-yard field goal, 1:29. Chargers 10–3. **Drive: 14 plays, 63 yards, 3:58.**
- OAK – Michael Crabtree 13-yard pass from Derek Carr (Sebastian Janikowski kick), 0:22. Tied 10–10. **Drive: 6 plays, 75 yards, 1:07.**

**Third quarter**

- OAK – Sebastian Janikowski 33-yard field goal, 10:48. Raiders 13–10. **Drive: 8 plays, 45 yards, 8:45.**
- SD – Hunter Henry 7-yard pass from Philip Rivers (kick blocked), 6:14. Chargers 16–13. **Drive: 7 plays, 77 yards, 4:34.**

**Fourth quarter**

- OAK – Sebastian Janikowski 21-yard field goal, 8:38. Tied 16–16. **Drive: 6 plays, 11 yards, 2:57.**
- OAK – Sebastian Janikowski 44-yard field goal, 2:40. Raiders 19–16. **Drive: 9 plays, 54 yards, 3:47.**

**Top passers**

- OAK – Derek Carr – 19/30, 213 yards, TD, INT
- KC – Philip Rivers – 17/30, 206 yards, 2 TD, INT

**Top rushers**

- OAK – Latavius Murray – 13 rushes, 81 yards
- KC – Kenneth Farrow – 15 rushes, 39 yards

**Top receivers**

- OAK – Michael Crabtree – 6 receptions, 60 yards, TD
- KC – Dontrelle Inman – 5 receptions, 68 yards

**Top tacklers**

- OAK – David Amerson 6
- SD – Jahleel Addae 8

With the loss, the Chargers were mathematically eliminated from playoff contention for the 3rd straight year, and 7th time in 8 years while ironcally letting the Raiders to clinch their first playoff berth since 2002.

==== Week 16: at Cleveland Browns ====
Week Sixteen: San Diego Chargers at Cleveland Browns – Game summary

Quarter	1	2	3	4	Total
Chargers	10	0	7	0	**17**
**Browns**	7	10	3	0	**20**

at FirstEnergy Stadium, Cleveland, Ohio

- Date: December 24
- Game time: 1:00 p.m. EST/10:00 a.m. PST
- Game weather: 38 °F (3 °C), cloudy
- Game attendance: 57,272
- Referee: Walt Coleman
- TV announcers (CBS): Spero Dedes and Solomon Wilcots
- Recap, Gamebook

Game information

**First quarter**

- SD – Antonio Gates 1-yard pass from Philip Rivers (Josh Lambo kick), 10:49. Chargers 7–0. **Drive: 8 plays, 75 yards, 4:11.**
- CLE – Isaiah Crowell 8-yard run (Cody Parkey kick), 5:12. Tied 7–7. **Drive: 10 plays, 72 yards, 5:37.**
- SD – Josh Lambo 43-yard field goal, 1:49. Chargers 10–7. **Drive: 7 plays, 50 yards, 3:23.**

**Second quarter**

- CLE – Isaiah Crowell 4-yard run (Cody Parkey kick), 12:39. Browns 14–10. **Drive: 10 plays, 75 yards, 4:10.**
- CLE – Cody Parkey 49-yard field goal, 4:46. Browns 17–10. **Drive: 10 plays, 39 yards, 4:49.**

**Third quarter**

- CLE – Cody Parkey 27-yard field goal, 10:58. Browns 20–10. **Drive: 8 plays, 57 yards, 4:02.**
- SD – Tyrell Williams 1-yard pass from Philip Rivers (Josh Lambo kick), 6:04. Browns 20–17. **Drive: 11 plays, 75 yards, 4:54.**

**Fourth quarter**

- No scoring plays

**Top passers**

- SD – Philip Rivers – 23/46, 322 yards, 2 TD, INT
- CLE – Robert Griffin III – 17/25, 164 yards

**Top rushers**

- SD – Kenneth Farrow – 9 rushes, 28 yards
- CLE – Isaiah Crowell – 16 rushes, 54 yards, 2 TD

**Top receivers**

- SD – Antonio Gates – 8 receptions, 94 yards, TD
- CLE – Gary Barnidge – 5 receptions, 42 yards

The loss dropped the Chargers to 5–10, and they became the only team to lose to the Cleveland Browns in 2016.

==== Week 17: vs. Kansas City Chiefs ====
Week Seventeen: Kansas City Chiefs at San Diego Chargers – Game summary

Quarter	1	2	3	4	Total
**Chiefs**	3	17	14	3	**37**
Chargers	3	7	7	10	**27**

at Qualcomm Stadium, San Diego, California

- Date: January 1, 2017
- Game time: 1:25 p.m. PST
- Game weather: 59 °F (15 °C), cloudy
- Game attendance: 54,915
- Referee: Walt Anderson
- TV announcers (CBS): Greg Gumbel, Trent Green and Jamie Erdahl
- Recap, Gamebook

Game information

**First quarter**

- SD – Josh Lambo 35-yard field goal, 10:16. Chargers 3–0. **Drive: 10 plays, 55 yards, 4:44.**
- KC – Cairo Santos 35-yard field goal, 5:20. Tied 3–3. **Drive: 10 plays, 53 yards, 4:56.**

**Second quarter**

- SD – Antonio Gates 2-yard pass from Philip Rivers (Josh Lambo kick), 14:49. Chargers 10–3. **Drive: 11 plays, 76 yards, 5:31.**
- KC – Alex Smith 5-yard run (Cairo Santos kick), 12:53. Tied 10–10. **Drive: 4 plays, 75 yards, 1:56.**
- KC – Charcandrick West 4-yard pass from Alex Smith (Cairo Santos kick), 6:09. Chiefs 17–10. **Drive: 9 plays, 34 yards, 4:26.**
- KC – Cairo Santos 25-yard field goal, 0:00. Chiefs 20–10. **Drive: 8 plays, 73 yards, 1:10.**

**Third quarter**

- SD – Jahleel Addae 90-yard interception return (Josh Lambo kick), 10:23. Chiefs 20–17.
- KC – Charcandrick West 2-yard pass from Alex Smith (Cairo Santos kick), 3:48. Chiefs 27–17. **Drive: 12 plays, 60 yards, 6:35.**
- KC – Tyreek Hill 95-yard punt return (Cairo Santos kick), 0:59. Chiefs 34–17.

**Fourth quarter**

- SD – Josh Lambo 29-yard field goal, 10:19. Chiefs 34–20. **Drive: 14 plays, 64 yards, 5:40.**
- KC – Cairo Santos 37-yard field goal, 4:31. Chiefs 37–20. **Drive: 10 plays, 31 yards, 5:48.**
- SD – Hunter Henry 12-yard pass from Philip Rivers (Josh Lambo kick), 2:08. Chiefs 37–27. **Drive: 10 plays, 89 yards, 2:23.**

**Top passers**

- KC – Alex Smith – 21/28, 264 yards, 2 TD, INT
- SD – Philip Rivers – 22/38, 269 yards, 2 TD, 2 INT

**Top rushers**

- KC – Charcandrick West – 16 rushes, 58 yards
- SD – Andre Williams – 18 rushes, 87 yards

**Top receivers**

- KC – Charcandrick West – 5 receptions, 58 yards, 2 TD
- SD – Tyrell Williams – 6 receptions, 70 yards

With their sixth straight loss to the Chiefs, the Chargers finished the season 5–11. This was to be the final game played as the San Diego Chargers before relocating to Los Angeles in January 2017.

== Standings ==
=== Division ===
AFC West
	W	L	T	PCT	DIV	CONF	PF	PA	STK
^{(2)} Kansas City Chiefs	12	4	0	.750	6–0	9–3	389	311	W2
^{(5)} Oakland Raiders	12	4	0	.750	3–3	9–3	416	385	L1
Denver Broncos	9	7	0	.563	2–4	6–6	333	297	W1
San Diego Chargers	5	11	0	.313	1–5	4–8	410	423	L5

=== Conference ===
AFC
#	Team	Division	W	L	T	PCT	DIV	CONF	SOS	SOV	STK
Division leaders
1	New England Patriots	East	14	2	0	.875	5–1	11–1	.439	.424	W7
2 (Note: Kansas City clinched the AFC West division over Oakland based on head-to-head sweep.)	Kansas City Chiefs	West	12	4	0	.750	6–0	9–3	.508	.479	W2
3	Pittsburgh Steelers	North	11	5	0	.688	5–1	9–3	.494	.423	W7
4 (Note: Houston clinched the AFC South division title over Tennessee based on record vs. division opponents.)	Houston Texans	South	9	7	0	.563	5–1	7–5	.502	.427	L1
Wild Cards
5	Oakland Raiders	West	12	4	0	.750	3–3	9–3	.504	.443	L1
6	Miami Dolphins	East	10	6	0	.625	4–2	7–5	.455	.341	L1
Did not qualify for the postseason
7 (Note: Tennessee finished ahead of Denver based on head-to-head victory.)	Tennessee Titans	South	9	7	0	.563	2–4	6–6	.465	.458	W1
8	Denver Broncos	West	9	7	0	.563	2–4	6–6	.549	.455	W1
9 (Note: Baltimore finished ahead of Indianapolis based on record vs. conference opponents.)	Baltimore Ravens	North	8	8	0	.500	4–2	7–5	.498	.363	L2
10	Indianapolis Colts	South	8	8	0	.500	3–3	5–7	.492	.406	W1
11	Buffalo Bills	East	7	9	0	.438	1–5	4–8	.482	.339	L2
12	Cincinnati Bengals	North	6	9	1	.406	3–3	5–7	.521	.333	W1
13 (Note: The New York Jets finished ahead of San Diego based record vs. common opponents — the Jets' cumulative record against Cleveland, Indianapolis, Kansas City and Miami was 1–4, while San Diego's cumulative record against the same four teams was 0–5.)	New York Jets	East	5	11	0	.313	2–4	4–8	.518	.313	W1
14	San Diego Chargers	West	5	11	0	.313	1–5	4–8	.543	.513	L5
15	Jacksonville Jaguars	South	3	13	0	.188	2–4	2–10	.527	.417	L1
16	Cleveland Browns	North	1	15	0	.063	0–6	1–11	.549	.313	L1
Tiebreakers (Note: When breaking ties for three or more teams under the NFL's rules, they are first broken within divisions, then comparing only the highest ranked remaining team from each division.)
