= Dontrelle Inman =

American football player (born 1989)

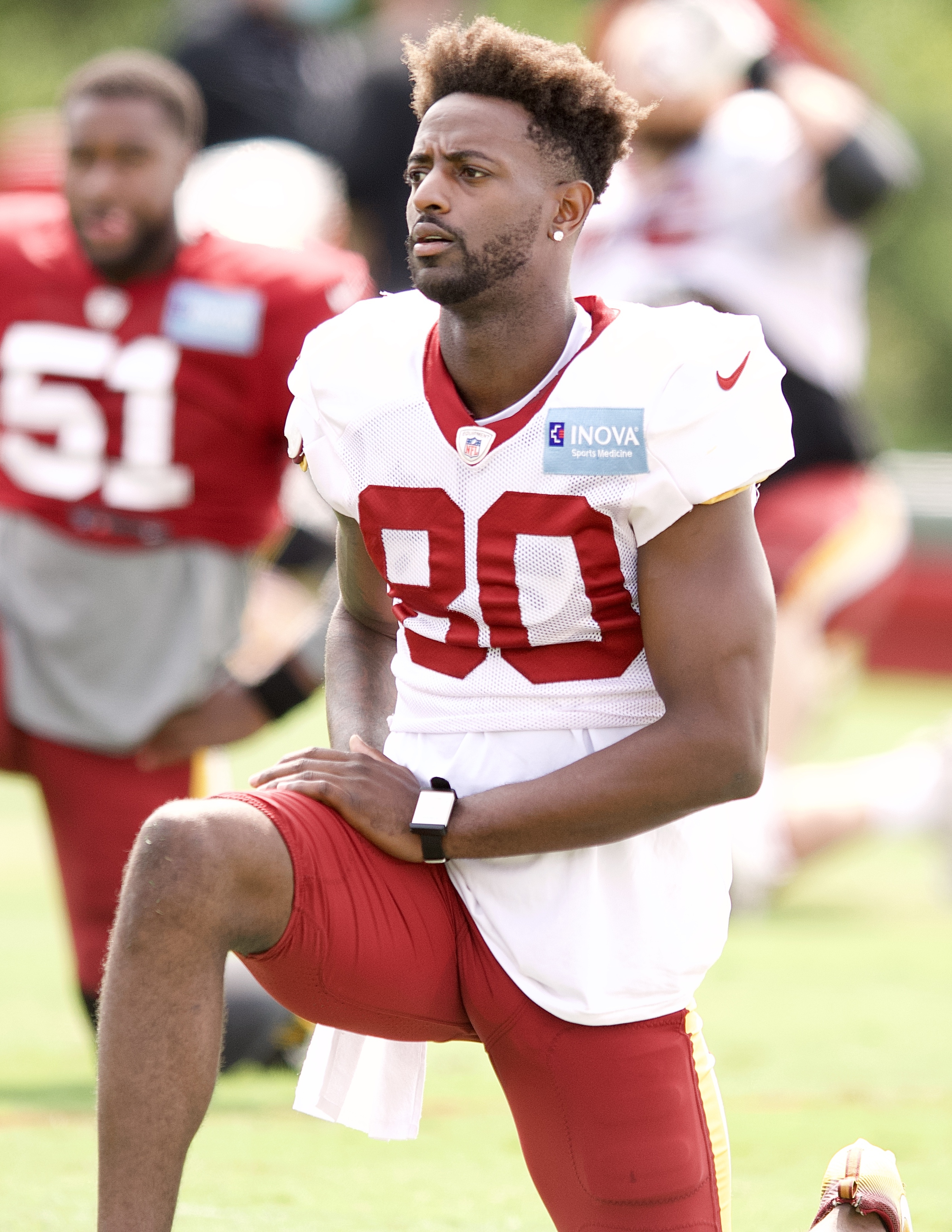
- Inman with the Washington Football Team in 2020

No. 15, 17, 86, 80
- Position: Wide receiver

Personal information
- Born: January 31, 1989 (age 37); Charleston, South Carolina, U.S.
- Listed height: 6 ft 3 in (1.91 m)
- Listed weight: 205 lb (93 kg)

Career information
- High school: Batesburg (SC)
- College: Virginia (2007–2010)
- NFL draft: 2011: undrafted

Career history
- Jacksonville Jaguars (2011)*; Toronto Argonauts (2012–2013); San Diego / Los Angeles Chargers (2014–2017); Chicago Bears (2017); Indianapolis Colts (2018); New England Patriots (2019)*; Los Angeles Chargers (2019); Indianapolis Colts (2019); Washington Football Team (2020); Toronto Argonauts (2023)*
- * Offseason or practice squad member only

Awards and highlights
- Grey Cup champion (2012)

Career NFL statistics
- Receptions: 188
- Receiving yards: 2,445
- Receiving touchdowns: 13
- Stats at Pro Football Reference

Career CFL statistics
- Receptions: 100
- Receiving yards: 1,542
- Receiving touchdowns: 11
- Stats at CFL.ca

Dontrelle Javaar Inman (born January 31, 1989) is an American former professional football player who was a wide receiver in the National Football League (NFL) and Canadian Football League (CFL). He played college football for the Virginia Cavaliers and was signed by the NFL's Jacksonville Jaguars as an undrafted free agent in 2011. He was a Grey Cup champion in the CFL with the Toronto Argonauts in 2012 and was a member of several other NFL teams.

== Professional career ==
Pre-draft measurables
| Height | Weight | 40-yard dash | 10-yard split | 20-yard split | 20-yard shuttle | Three-cone drill | Vertical jump | Broad jump | Bench press |
|---|---|---|---|---|---|---|---|---|---|
| 6 ft 3 in (1.91 m) | 198 lb (90 kg) | 4.47 s | 1.60 s | 2.63 s | 4.13 s | 6.53 s | 34 in (0.86 m) | 9 ft 10 in (3.00 m) | 11 reps |
All values from Virginia Pro Day.

=== Jacksonville Jaguars ===
After going undrafted in the 2011 NFL draft, Inman signed with the Jacksonville Jaguars as an undrafted free agent on July 26, 2011. He was released on September 4.

=== Toronto Argonauts (first stint) ===
In 2012, Inman signed with the Toronto Argonauts of the Canadian Football League. In his rookie CFL season, Inman recorded 50 receptions for 803 yards and five touchdowns. Inman went on to win the 100th Grey Cup with the Argonauts.

In 2013, Inman recorded 50 receptions for 739 yards and six touchdowns. On June 28, 2013, Inman was pressed into punting duties after an injury to starting kicker Swayze Waters during a game against the visiting Hamilton Tiger-Cats. In that game, Inman recorded three punts for a total of 88 yards, yielding a 29.3 yard punting average.

On December 24, the Argonauts released Inman.

=== San Diego / Los Angeles Chargers (first stint) ===
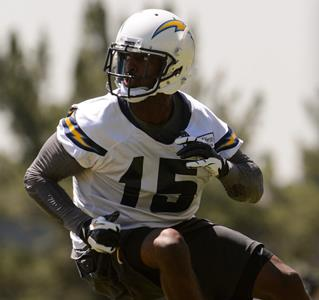
Inman participating at Chargers' training camp in 2014.

On January 6, 2014, Inman signed a reserves/futures contract with the San Diego Chargers. In his first preseason game as a Charger, Inman had three receptions for 107 yards against the Dallas Cowboys, including a 70-yard touchdown in the third quarter. Inman secured his spot on the 53-man roster with another impressive performance in his last preseason game, leading receivers with three receptions for 54 yards. On December 20, he caught his first NFL pass in a game against the 49ers. His 17-yard gain helped set up Malcom Floyd’s score-tying touchdown and the Chargers’ eventual win in overtime. Inman had seven catches for 79 yards in the victory. In the final game of the 2014 NFL season, Inman caught 5 receptions for 79 yards. He would finish the season with 12 catches for 158 yards (13.2 yards per catch) in two games.

By the end of the 2015 preseason, Inman survived the cuts and made the 53-man roster. On October 4, against the Cleveland Browns, Inman stepped in for the injured Malcom Floyd and caught a clutch 68-yard catch. On October 18 against the Green Bay Packers, Inman caught a touchdown with no time left on a fourth down. Inman finished the game with 18 yards and a touchdown, playing in for an injured Keenan Allen. On November 29, Inman had 5 receptions for 65 yards and 1 touchdown in a game against the Jacksonville Jaguars. On December 20, in a win against the Miami Dolphins, Inman had three receptions for 78 yards. On December 24 (Christmas Eve) against the Oakland Raiders, Inman had eight receptions for 82 yards and scored one touchdown. Inman also saw snaps at safety during that game when the Chargers had run out of safeties due to injuries. Inman finished the 2015 season playing in 14 games, recording 35 receptions for 486 yards and scoring three touchdowns.

In 2016, the Chargers picked up Inman's one-year tender for $600,000.

On March 9, 2017, the Chargers placed a second-round tender on Inman. He officially signed his tender on April 25. On May 20, it was revealed that Inman underwent core muscle surgery.

On October 22, it was reported Inman was inactive against the Denver Broncos.

=== Chicago Bears ===
On October 25, 2017, Inman was traded to the Chicago Bears for a conditional seventh round draft pick. In his November 12 debut against the Green Bay Packers, Inman made 6-of-8 receptions for 88 yards. For the remainder of the season, he went 17-of-32 receptions for 246 yards with one touchdown. He became a free agent at the end of the season.

=== Indianapolis Colts (first stint) ===
On October 16, 2018, after an injury to Marcus Johnson, Inman was signed by the Indianapolis Colts. After the season, he became a free agent.

=== New England Patriots ===
On May 13, 2019, Inman signed a one-year contract with the New England Patriots. On August 18, after the return of fellow wide receiver Josh Gordon, he requested and was granted his release from the Patriots.

=== Los Angeles Chargers (second stint) ===
On August 20, 2019, Inman signed with the Los Angeles Chargers. On October 2, he was placed on injured reserve with a quad injury against the Miami Dolphins. After spending six weeks on injured reserve, he was released on November 25.

=== Indianapolis Colts (second stint) ===
On December 10, 2019, Inman signed with the Indianapolis Colts. He played in 3 games, managing 4-of-8 receptions for 49 yards.

=== Washington Football Team ===
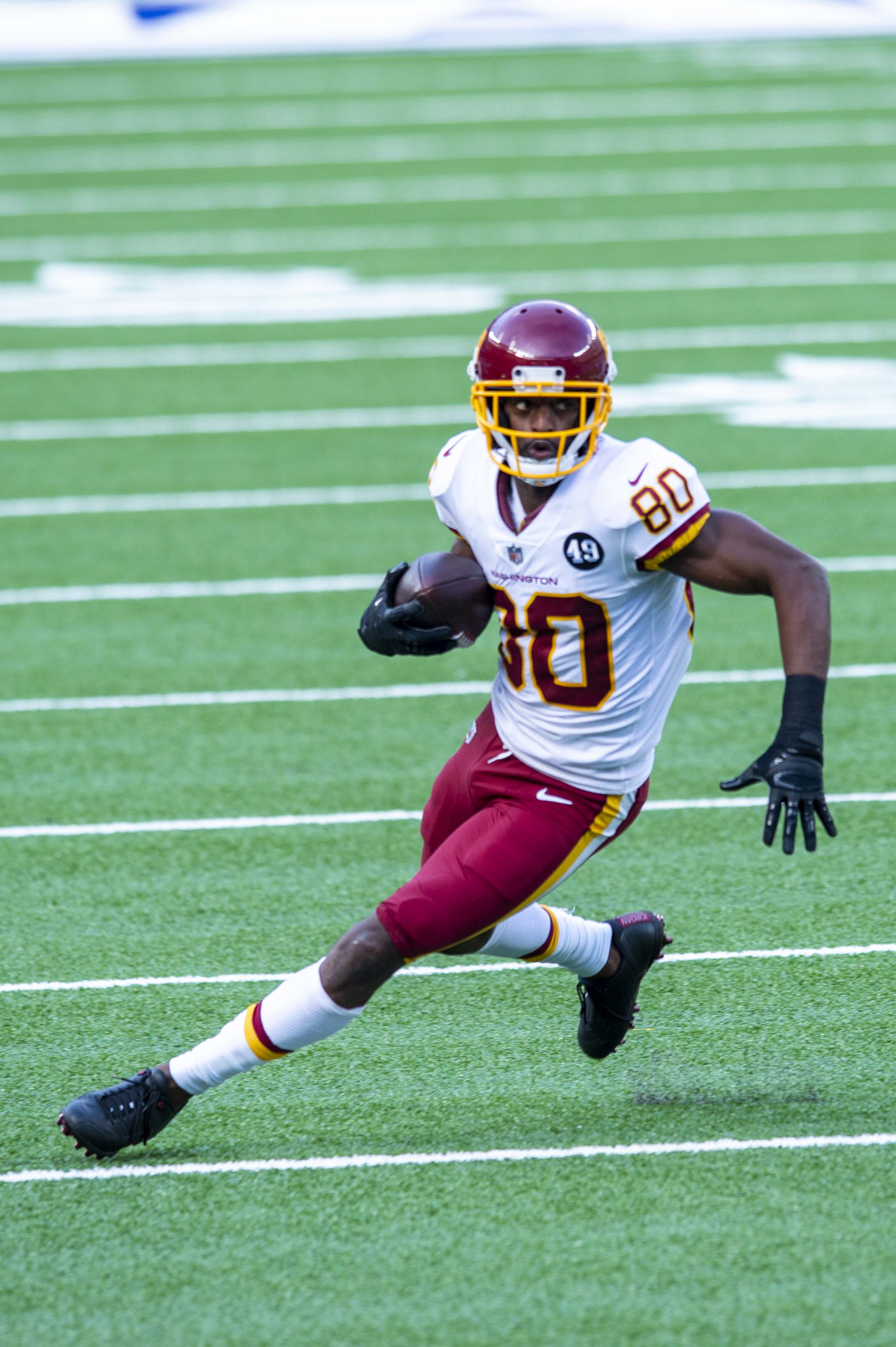
Inman playing against the New York Giants in 2020.

Inman signed with the Washington Football Team on August 4, 2020. In Week 3 against the Cleveland Browns, he had three receptions for 38 receiving yards and two touchdowns in the 34–20 loss. Inman was waived by the team on December 26. He was re-signed to their practice squad on December 30. On January 2, 2021, Inman was elevated to the active roster for their Week 17 game against the Philadelphia Eagles, being reverted to the practice squad shortly after. On January 8, in their Wild Card playoff game against the Tampa Bay Buccaneers, he was again elevated to the active roster, but reverted to the practice squad. His practice squad contract with the team expired after the season ended on January 18.

=== Toronto Argonauts (second stint) ===
On March 1, 2023, the Toronto Argonauts announced their signing of Inman. However, after one day of training camp, it was announced on May 15 that he had retired.

== NFL career statistics ==
| Year | Team | GP | Receiving | | | | | Fumbles | |
| Year | Team | GP | Rec | Yds | Avg | Lng | TD | Fum | Lost |
|---|---|---|---|---|---|---|---|---|---|
| 2014 | SD | 7 | 12 | 158 | 13.8 | 28 | 0 | 0 | 0 |
| 2015 | SD | 14 | 35 | 486 | 13.9 | 68 | 3 | 2 | 1 |
| 2016 | SD | 16 | 58 | 810 | 14 | 57 | 4 | 0 | 0 |
| 2017 | LAC | 4 | 2 | 9 | 4.5 | 7 | 0 | 0 | 0 |
| 2017 | CHI | 8 | 23 | 334 | 14.5 | 26 | 1 | 0 | 0 |
| 2018 | IND | 9 | 28 | 304 | 10.9 | 16 | 3 | 0 | 0 |
| 2019 | LAC | 4 | 8 | 132 | 16.5 | 28 | 0 | 0 | 0 |
| 2019 | IND | 3 | 4 | 49 | 12.3 | 22 | 0 | 0 | 0 |
| 2020 | WAS | 10 | 18 | 163 | 9.1 | 17 | 2 | 1 | 0 |
| Career | | 75 | 188 | 2,445 | 13 | 68 | 13 | 3 | 1 |
