= Jatavis Brown =

American football player (born 1994)

No. 57, 53
- Position: Linebacker

Personal information
- Born: February 18, 1994 (age 32); Belle Glade, Florida, U.S.
- Listed height: 5 ft 11 in (1.80 m)
- Listed weight: 221 lb (100 kg)

Career information
- High school: Glades Central (Belle Glade)
- College: Akron (2012–2015)
- NFL draft: 2016: 5th round, 175th overall pick

Career history
- San Diego / Los Angeles Chargers (2016–2019); Philadelphia Eagles (2020)*
- * Offseason or practice squad member only

Awards and highlights
- PFWA All-Rookie Team (2016); MAC Defensive Player of the Year (2015); 3× All-MAC First-team (2013–2015)

Career NFL statistics
- Total tackles: 262
- Sacks: 4.5
- Forced fumbles: 3
- Fumble recoveries: 2
- Pass deflections: 12
- Stats at Pro Football Reference

Jatavis Antonio Brown (born February 18, 1994) is an American former professional football player who was a linebacker in the National Football League (NFL). He attended Glades Central High School in Belle Glade, Florida and played college football for the Akron Zips. He was selected by the San Diego Chargers in the fifth round of the 2016 NFL draft.

== College career ==
Brown was a standout linebacker at Akron, being named to All-Mid-American Conference (MAC) First-team three years in a row. He received the MAC Defensive Player of the Year honor in his senior season after recording a single season record 12.5 sacks, and school single season record 20.5 tackles for loss, and 116 total tackles.

=== Statistics ===
			Defense						
Year	Team	GP	Tak	For loss	Sacks	INT	FF	PDef	TDs
2012	Akron	-	23	0.5	0.0	0	1	0	0
2013	Akron	11	107	6.5	1.0	0	2	2	0
2014	Akron	11	94	14.0	4.0	0	3	0	0
2015	Akron	13	116	20.5	12.5	1	4	1	0
Totals		35	340	41.5	17.5	1	10	3	0

== Professional career ==
=== Pre-draft ===
On January 21, 2016, it was announced that Brown was selected to play in the NFLPA Collegiate Bowl. On January 23, 2016, Brown played in the NFLPA Collegiate Bowl and had an impressive performance as part of Mike Holmgren's National team that defeated the American team 18–17. Brown was instrumental in the victory and was a candidate for NFLPA Collegiate Bowl MVP. Although his performance in the collegiate bowl potentially raised his draft stock, Brown was still unable to attain an invitation to the NFL Scouting Combine and was not one of 322 college prospects invited. It was speculated by media members that he was snubbed due to his small stature for the linebacker position, although two linebackers who were invited also measured in at 5'11" and the shortest was Utah's Gionni Paul at 5'10". On February 14, 2016, Brown attended the NFL's first Regional Scouting Combine in Houston, Texas. He performed combine drills for scouts and impressed them by running a 4.47s in the 40-yard dash.

On March 18, 2016, Brown attended Akron's pro day, and decided to run all of the combine drills again for team representatives and scouts. He beat his time in the Regional Combine in the 40-yard dash, finishing with 4.44s, to and had 33 reps in the bench press, which would've finished first among all linebackers at the NFL Scouting Combine. 30 team representatives from 22 NFL teams attended to scout Brown as the featured prospect. Brown also attended private workouts and visits with ten NFL teams, including the Cleveland Browns, Pittsburgh Steelers, San Diego Chargers, Tennessee Titans, Kansas City Chiefs, Indianapolis Colts, New York Giants, and Los Angeles Rams. At the conclusion of the pre-draft process, Brown was projected to be a third or fourth round pick by NFL draft experts and scouts. He was ranked as the ninth best linebacker prospect in the draft by NFL analyst Mike Mayock, was ranked the 13th best outside linebacker in the draft by NFLDraftScout.com, and was ranked the 13th best linebacker in the draft by Pro Football Focus.

Pre-draft measurables
Height	Weight	Arm length	Hand span	40-yard dash	10-yard split	20-yard split	20-yard shuttle	Three-cone drill	Vertical jump	Broad jump	Bench press
5 ft 10 7/8 in (1.80 m)	227 lb (103 kg)	31 in (0.79 m)	9 in (0.23 m)	4.44 s	1.53 s	2.60 s	4.31 s	7.19 s	35.5 in (0.90 m)	10 ft 5 in (3.18 m)	33 reps
All values from Akron's Pro Day

=== San Diego / Los Angeles Chargers ===
==== 2016 ====
The Chargers selected Brown in the fifth round (175th overall) of the 2016 NFL draft. He was the 22nd linebacker drafted and the second linebacker drafted by the Chargers in 2016 after they selected Ohio State's Joshua Perry in the fourth round. Brown was the first linebacker drafted from Akron in school history and was the first player drafted from Akron since Reggie Corner in 2008. He also became only the 15th player drafted from Akron since the inception of the NFL draft in 1936. On May 5, 2016, the Chargers signed Brown to a four-year, $2.52 million contract that included a signing bonus of $184,385.

Throughout training camp, Brown competed for a job as a backup inside linebacker against Nick Dzubnar, Perry, and James Ross. Brown fell behind in the competition and had his progress stunted after he sustained an ankle injury that sidelined him for the Chargers' first three preseason games. Head coach Mike McCoy named Brown the backup inside linebacker behind Denzel Perryman and Manti Te'o to begin the regular season.

He made his professional regular-season debut in the Chargers' season-opener at the Chiefs and recorded three combined tackles and a pass deflection during a 33–27 loss. He played 27% of the Chargers' defensive snaps in his debut. On September 25, 2016, Brown collected six combined tackles, two pass breakups, and made his first career sack on Colts quarterback Andrew Luck during the Chargers' 26–22 victory. On October 2, 2016, Brown earned his first career start after Manti Te'o suffered a torn Achilles tendon during the Chargers' win in Indianapolis. He recorded a total of seven solo tackles as the Chargers were defeated 35–34 by the New Orleans Saints. In Week 6, he collected a season-high 14 combined tackles (13 solo), forced a fumble, and made his third career sack in the Chargers' 21–13 win against the Denver Broncos. In Week 8, Brown made ten combined tackles and defended a pass during the Chargers' 27–19 loss at the Denver Broncos, but left the game in the fourth quarter after suffering a knee injury when a Broncos' offensive lineman slammed into his leg. He was expected to miss two games, but ended up being sidelined for four consecutive games (Weeks 9–13). On December 24, 2016, he made ten combined tackles and also recorded a sack on Robert Griffin III with teammate Kyle Emanuel as the Chargers lost at the Browns 20–17. He finished his rookie season in 2016 with in 12 games with 79 combined tackles (64 solo), 3.5 sacks, six passes defensed, and two forced fumbles in 12 games and seven starts. He finished first on the team with 79 combined tackles in 2016. He was named to the PFWA All-Rookie Team.

==== 2017 ====
During the offseason, the Chargers officially relocated to Los Angeles and were renamed the Los Angeles Chargers. Throughout training camp, new defensive coordinator Gus Bradley held an open competition after opting to switch the Chargers' defense to a base a 4–3 defense and a Cover 3 scheme. Brown competed against Korey Toomer and Emanuel for the job as the starting weakside linebacker. Head coach Anthony Lynn named Brown the starting weakside linebacker and Korey Toomer the starting middle linebacker after Perryman tore an ankle ligament in the Chargers' first preseason game.

He started the Chargers' season-opener at the Broncos and recorded a season-high 14 combined tackles during a 24–21 loss. In Week 4, he suffered a high ankle sprain during a 26–24 loss to the Philadelphia Eagles, but managed to play in 68 of the 75 defensive snaps. In Week 6, Brown was replaced as the starter by Korey Toomer, while Hayes Pullard was named the starting middle linebacker. Many analysts were confused by the demotion and speculated that Brown was still feeling the effects of his high ankle sprain as that was seen as the only logical conclusion of his demotion. Hayes Pullard and Korey Toomer had an advantage over the other linebackers as they both previously played under first year defensive coordinator Gus Bradley in Jacksonville Jaguars and Seattle Seahawks and also had an established relationship with him. Brown saw his defensive snap count decrease dramatically after Perryman returned and Week 10 and was moved to starting weakside linebacker. Brown was relegated to special teams and a reserve role on defense, playing dime linebacker in certain situations that needed a linebacker cover a tight end or running back. With his reduced role, Brown did not record a stat in Weeks 13–14. In Week 15, he recorded eight combined tackles during a 30–13 loss at the Chiefs.

Brown finished the 2017 regular season with a total of 79 combined tackles (54 solo) and a pass deflection in 16 games and five starts. From Week 5–17, Brown averaged just 20 snaps on defense a week. He was also replaced as the dime linebacker, as defensive coordinator Gus Bradley opted to go with safety Adrian Phillips when the offense had three or more wide receivers on the field, which was 64% of the time. The Chargers' defense strived under Gus Bradley, finishing sixth in yards per play (5.1). Brown was given an overall grade of 70.8 by Pro Football Focus and ranked 46th among all linebackers in overall grade among linebackers in 2017.

==== 2018 ====
Brown entered the 2018 season as a starting outside linebacker alongside Emanuel and Perryman. He played in 15 games with 10 starts, finishing second on the team with 97 combined tackles, along with one sack, five passes defended, and a forced fumble. He suffered an ankle injury in Week 17, missed the Chargers wild-card win over the Baltimore Ravens, and was placed on injured reserve on January 7, 2019.

=== Philadelphia Eagles ===
On March 27, 2020, Brown signed a one-year contract with the Philadelphia Eagles. On August 9, 2020, Brown announced his retirement from the NFL.
