= 2017 Los Angeles Chargers season =

58th season in franchise history, first in Los Angeles since 1960

- Owner: Alex Spanos
- General manager: Tom Telesco
- Head coach: Anthony Lynn
- Home stadium: StubHub Center

Results
- Record: 9–7
- Division place: 2nd AFC West
- Playoffs: Did not qualify
- All-Pros: 1: CB Casey Hayward (2nd team)
- Pro Bowlers: 6: WR Keenan Allen; DE Joey Bosa; DE Melvin Ingram; CB Casey Hayward; T Russell Okung; QB Philip Rivers

The 2017 season was the Los Angeles Chargers' 48th in the National Football League (NFL), their 58th overall, their second in the Greater Los Angeles Area and their first under head coach Anthony Lynn. It was the Chargers' first season in Los Angeles since their inaugural 1960 season, when they were in the AFL, as the team exercised its option to move back to the city and join the Los Angeles Rams on January 12, 2017. The 2017 season was the first of three seasons played at StubHub Center prior to the new stadium in Inglewood being completed in 2020.

The Chargers, despite an 0–4 start, finished the season with 9–7 record and improved their 5–11 record from last season after a week 13 win over the Cleveland Browns. Their season finale win over the Raiders helped the Chargers finish with a winning record for the first time since 2014. However, they missed the playoffs for the fourth consecutive season — the Chargers finished in a four-way tie with the Tennessee Titans, Buffalo Bills and Baltimore Ravens for the two Wild Card playoff spots, but the Titans and Bills claimed the Wild Cards based on tiebreakers.

== Offseason ==
=== Transition to Los Angeles ===
On January 2, 2017, Chargers' head coach Mike McCoy was fired along with the majority of his coaching staff. On January 12, 2017, Chargers' owner Dean Spanos announced during a press conference the decision to immediately return the San Diego Chargers to Los Angeles. Spanos had a deadline of January 17, 2017, to decide if he wanted to return the team to Los Angeles. The Chargers were chosen by the league in 2016 as the second team to be allowed to relocate to Los Angeles with the Los Angeles Rams and play at SoFi Stadium in Inglewood, California. Until the new stadium was completed in 2020, the Chargers played the 2017, 2018, and 2019 seasons at the StubHub Center in Carson, California.

The Chargers transitioned from San Diego to new headquarters in the Los Angeles area throughout the offseason, although social and fan reaction was overwhelmingly negative. The team held their mini-camp in San Diego, with the final day on the field at the old practice field coming on June 15. Former players James Lofton, Nick Hardwick and Jacques Cesaire showed up on the final day, as did fans.

Trucks moved equipment up the road after the final practice. Front office people continued to work in San Diego until the team's lease expired later in the summer then the team completely moved to their new headquarters in Costa Mesa, California.

=== Signings ===
Position	Player	Age	2016 Team	Contract
OT	Russell Okung	29	Denver Broncos	4 years, $53 million
DE	Damion Square	28	San Diego Chargers	2 years, $4 million
S	Tre Boston	25	Carolina Panthers	1 year, $900,000
RB	Branden Oliver	25	San Diego Chargers	1 year, $800,000
TE	Jeff Cumberland	29	San Diego Chargers	1 year, $775,000
RB	Kenjon Barner	27	Philadelphia Eagles	1 year, $690,000
DE	Tenny Palepoi	26	San Diego Chargers	1 year, $615,000

=== Releases ===
Position	Player	Age	2017 Team
OT	King Dunlap	31	Retired
OG	D.J. Fluker	25	New York Giants
LB	Manti Te'o	26	New Orleans Saints
WR	Jeremy Butler	25	Buffalo Bills
CB	Brandon Flowers	31	Retired
WR	Stevie Johnson	30	TBD
DT	Sean Lissemore	29	TBD
RB	Danny Woodhead	32	Baltimore Ravens
RB	Dexter McCluster	28	TBD
RB	Ronnie Hillman	25	Dallas Cowboys
CB	Robert McClain	28	Tampa Bay Buccaneers

== NFL draft ==
2017 Los Angeles Chargers draft
Round	Selection	Player	Position	College
1	7	Mike Williams	WR	Clemson University
2	38	Forrest Lamp	G	Western Kentucky
3	71	Dan Feeney	G	Indiana
4	113	Rayshawn Jenkins	S	Miami
5	151	Desmond King	S	Iowa
6	190	Sam Tevi	OT	Utah
7	225	Isaac Rochell	DE	Notre Dame

== Staff ==
2017 Los Angeles Chargers staff
Front office: Owner – Alex Spanos; Chairman/president – Dean Spanos; Executive vice president – Michael Spanos; CEO/president – Business Operations – A. G. Spanos; General manager – Tom Telesco; President – Football Operations – John Spanos; Executive vice president of football administration/player finance – Ed McGuire; Senior executive – Randy Mueller; Director of pro scouting – Dennis Abraham; Senior director of pro personnel – Louis Clark; Director of player personnel – JoJo Wooden; Director of college scouting – Kevin Kelly; Head coaches: Head coach – Anthony Lynn; Assistant head coach/special teams coordinator – George Stewart; Offensive coaches: Offensive coordinator – Ken Whisenhunt; Quarterbacks – Shane Steichen; Running backs – Alfredo Roberts; Wide receivers – Nick Sirianni; Tight ends – John McNulty; Offensive line – Pat Meyer; Assistant offensive line – James Cregg; Offensive assistant – Mark Ridgley; Offensive quality control – Dan Shamash	Defensive coaches: Defensive coordinator – Gus Bradley; Defensive line – Giff Smith; Assistant defensive line – Eric Henderson; Linebackers – Richard Smith; Defensive backs – Ron Milus; Assistant defensive backs – Chris Harris; Defensive assistant – D'Anton Lynn; Special teams coaches: Assistant special teams – Marquice Williams; Strength and conditioning: Head strength and conditioning – John Lott; Assistant strength – Jonathan Brooks; Assistant strength – Larry Jackson

== Final roster ==
2017 Los Angeles Chargers roster
Quarterbacks (QB): 10 Kellen Clemens; 7 Cardale Jones; 17 Philip Rivers; Running backs (RB): 30 Austin Ekeler; 28 Melvin Gordon; 35 Russell Hansbrough; 32 Branden Oliver; 34 Derek Watt FB; Wide receivers (WR): 13 Keenan Allen; 12 Travis Benjamin; 11 Geremy Davis; 81 Mike Williams; 16 Tyrell Williams; Tight ends (TE): 80 Sean Culkin; 87 Jeff Cumberland; 85 Antonio Gates; 84 Sean McGrath	Offensive linemen (OL): 72 Joe Barksdale T; 66 Dan Feeney G; 76 Russell Okung T; 74 Michael Ola T; 73 Spencer Pulley C; 78 Michael Schofield T; 69 Sam Tevi T; 79 Kenny Wiggins G; Defensive linemen (DL): 97 Jeremiah Attaochu DE; 99 Joey Bosa DE; 54 Melvin Ingram DE; 94 Corey Liuget DT; 40 Chris McCain DE; 92 Brandon Mebane DT; 95 Tenny Palepoi DT; 93 Darius Philon DT; 98 Isaac Rochell DE; 71 Damion Square DT	Linebackers (LB): 57 Jatavis Brown OLB; 48 Nick Dzubnar MLB; 51 Kyle Emanuel OLB; 52 Denzel Perryman; 50 Hayes Pullard MLB; 56 Korey Toomer; Defensive backs (DB): 37 Jahleel Addae SS; 33 Tre Boston FS; 43 Michael Davis CB; 26 Casey Hayward CB; 25 Rayshawn Jenkins SS; 20 Desmond King CB; 29 Craig Mager CB; 31 Adrian Phillips FS; 24 Trevor Williams CB; Special teams (ST): 8 Drew Kaser P; 6 Nick Rose K; 47 Mike Windt LS	Practice squad: 83 Braedon Bowman TE; 45 A. J. Hendy FS; 49 James Onwualu OLB; 88 Andre Patton WR; 23 Jeff Richards CB; 90 Whitney Richardson DE; 82 Artavis Scott WR; 38 Jalen Simmons RB; 64 Cole Toner G; Reserve: 89 Isaiah Burse WR (IR); 63 Donavon Clark G (IR); 45 Asante Cleveland TE (IR); 96 Kaleb Eulls DT (IR); 27 Kenneth Farrow RB (IR); 75 Chris Hairston T (NF-Ill.); 86 Hunter Henry TE (IR); 77 Forrest Lamp G (IR); 46 Chris Landrum OLB (IR); 50 Meachealle Moore OLB (IR); 9 Nick Novak K (IR); 68 Matt Slauson G (IR); 22 Jason Verrett CB (IR); 44 Andre Williams RB (IR); Rookies in italics 53 active, 14 reserve, 9 practice squad

== Preseason ==
Week	Date	Opponent	Result	Record	Venue	Recap
1	August 13	Seattle Seahawks	L 17–48	0–1	StubHub Center	Recap
2	August 20	New Orleans Saints	L 7–13	0–2	StubHub Center	Recap
3	August 26	at Los Angeles Rams	W 21–19	1–2	Los Angeles Memorial Coliseum	Recap
4	August 31	at San Francisco 49ers	L 13–23	1–3	Levi's Stadium	Recap

== Regular season ==
=== Schedule ===
Week	Date	Opponent	Result	Record	Venue	Recap
1	September 11	at **Denver Broncos**	**L** 21–24	0–1	Sports Authority Field at Mile High	Recap
2	September 17	Miami Dolphins	**L** 17–19	0–2	StubHub Center	Recap
3	September 24	**Kansas City Chiefs**	**L** 10–24	0–3	StubHub Center	Recap
4	October 1	Philadelphia Eagles	**L** 24–26	0–4	StubHub Center	Recap
5	October 8	at New York Giants	**W** 27–22	1–4	MetLife Stadium	Recap
6	October 15	at **Oakland Raiders**	**W** 17–16	2–4	Oakland–Alameda County Coliseum	Recap
7	October 22	**Denver Broncos**	**W** 21–0	3–4	StubHub Center	Recap
8	October 29	at New England Patriots	**L** 13–21	3–5	Gillette Stadium	Recap
9	Bye					
10	November 12	at Jacksonville Jaguars	**L** 17–20 (OT)	3–6	EverBank Field	Recap
11	November 19	Buffalo Bills	**W** 54–24	4–6	StubHub Center	Recap
12	November 23	at Dallas Cowboys	**W** 28–6	5–6	AT&T Stadium	Recap
13	December 3	Cleveland Browns	**W** 19–10	6–6	StubHub Center	Recap
14	December 10	Washington Redskins	**W** 30–13	7–6	StubHub Center	Recap
15	December 16	at **Kansas City Chiefs**	**L** 13–30	7–7	Arrowhead Stadium	Recap
16	December 24	at New York Jets	**W** 14–7	8–7	MetLife Stadium	Recap
17	December 31	**Oakland Raiders**	**W** 30–10	9–7	StubHub Center	Recap

Note: Intra-division opponents are in bold text.

=== Game summaries ===
==== Week 1: at Denver Broncos ====
Week One: Los Angeles Chargers at Denver Broncos – Game summary

Quarter	1	2	3	4	Total
Chargers	0	7	0	14	**21**
**Broncos**	7	7	10	0	**24**

at Sports Authority Field at Mile High, Denver, Colorado

- Date: September 11
- Game time: 8:20 p.m. MDT/7:20 p.m. PDT
- Game weather: 73 °F (23 °C), mostly cloudy
- Game attendance: 76,324
- Referee: Terry McAulay
- TV announcers (ESPN): Beth Mowins, Rex Ryan and Sergio Dipp
- Recap, Gamebook

Game information

**First quarter**

- DEN – Bennie Fowler 5-yard pass from Trevor Siemian (Brandon McManus kick), 4:58. Broncos 7–0. **Drive: 13 plays, 70 yards, 6:05.**

**Second quarter**

- LAC – Melvin Gordon 11-yard pass from Philip Rivers (Younghoe Koo kick), 15:00. Tied 7–7. **Drive: 10 plays, 75 yards, 4:55.**
- DEN – Trevor Siemian 1-yard run (Brandon McManus kick), 5:33. Broncos 14–7. **Drive: 9 plays, 56 yards, 4:38.**

**Third quarter**

- DEN – Bennie Fowler 6-yard pass from Trevor Siemian (Brandon McManus kick), 10:31. Broncos 21–7. **Drive: 6 plays, 43 yards, 3:00.**
- DEN – Brandon McManus 20-yard field goal, 0:03. Broncos 24–7. **Drive: 14 plays, 78 yards, 8:16.**

**Fourth quarter**

- LAC – Keenan Allen 5-yard pass from Philip Rivers (Younghoe Koo kick), 8:15. Broncos 24–14. **Drive: 6 plays, 43 yards, 2:27.**
- LAC – Travis Benjamin 38-yard pass from Philip Rivers (Younghoe Koo kick), 7:07. Broncos 24–21. **Drive: 1 play, 38 yards, 0:07.**

**Top passers**

- LAC – Philip Rivers – 22/33, 192 yards, 3 TD, INT
- DEN – Trevor Siemian – 17/28, 219 yards, 2 TD, INT

**Top rushers**

- LAC – Melvin Gordon – 18 rushes, 54 yards
- DEN – C. J. Anderson – 20 rushes, 81 yards

**Top receivers**

- LAC – Tyrell Williams – 5 receptions, 54 yards
- DEN – Demaryius Thomas – 5 receptions, 67 yards

**Top tacklers**

- LAC – Jatavis Brown - 11 Tackles, 3 Assisted
- DEN – Brandon Marshall - 5 Tackles, 3 Assisted

Rookie kicker Younghoe Koo's game-tying 44-yard field goal attempt in the final seconds was blocked by the Denver's Shelby Harris, and the Chargers lost 24–21. An earlier attempt by Koo was successful, but it was called off after the Broncos had called a timeout right before the snap.

==== Week 2: vs. Miami Dolphins ====
Week Two: Miami Dolphins at Los Angeles Chargers – Game summary

Quarter	1	2	3	4	Total
**Dolphins**	3	0	10	6	**19**
Chargers	0	10	7	0	**17**

at StubHub Center, Carson, California

- Date: September 17
- Game time: 1:05 p.m. PDT
- Game weather: 71 °F (22 °C), cloudy
- Game attendance: 25,381
- Referee: Tony Corrente
- TV announcers (CBS): Greg Gumbel, Trent Green and Jamie Erdahl
- Recap, Gamebook

Game information

**First quarter**

- MIA – Cody Parkey 30-yard field goal, 7:13. Dolphins 3–0. **Drive: 13 plays, 70 yards, 6:18.**

**Second quarter**

- LAC – Younghoe Koo 41-yard field goal, 13:46. Tied 3–3. **Drive: 6 plays, 23 yards, 2:36.**
- LAC – Melvin Gordon 1-yard run (Younghoe Koo kick), 5:05. Chargers 10–3. **Drive: 7 plays, 70 yards, 3:57.**

**Third quarter**

- MIA – Kenny Stills 29-yard pass from Jay Cutler (Cody Parkey kick), 12:15. Tied 10–10. **Drive: 7 plays, 75 yards, 2:53.**
- LAC – Antonio Gates 7-yard pass from Philip Rivers (Younghoe Koo kick), 8:24. Chargers 17–10. **Drive: 8 plays, 77 yards, 3:49.**
- MIA – Cody Parkey 28-yard field goal, 2:48. Chargers 17–13. **Drive: 12 plays, 67 yards, 5:35.**

**Fourth quarter**

- MIA – Cody Parkey 35-yard field goal, 6:32. Chargers 17–16. **Drive: 14 plays, 64 yards, 7:05.**
- MIA – Cody Parkey 54-yard field goal, 1:10. Dolphins 19–17. **Drive: 5 plays, 15 yards, 1:57.**

**Top passers**

- MIA – Jay Cutler – 24/33, 230 yards, TD
- LAC – Philip Rivers – 31/39, 331 yards, TD

**Top rushers**

- MIA – Jay Ajayi – 28 rushes, 122 yards
- LAC – Branden Oliver – 3 rushes, 31 yards

**Top receivers**

- MIA – Jarvis Landry – 13 receptions, 78 yards
- LAC – Keenan Allen – 9 receptions, 100 yards

**Top tacklers**

- MIA – Mike Hull - 7 Tackles, 3 Assisted
- LAC – Jatavis Brown - 6 Tackles, 6 Assisted

In their first Game back In Los Angeles since 1960 Koo missed a game-winning 44-yard field goal attempt as time expired in a 19–17 loss to Miami.

==== Week 3: vs. Kansas City Chiefs ====
Week Three: Kansas City Chiefs at Los Angeles Chargers – Game summary

Quarter	1	2	3	4	Total
**Chiefs**	14	3	0	7	**24**
Chargers	7	3	0	0	**10**

at StubHub Center, Carson, California

- Date: September 24
- Game time: 1:25 p.m. PDT
- Game weather: 84 °F (29 °C), sunny
- Game attendance: 25,386
- Referee: Walt Anderson
- TV announcers (CBS): Kevin Harlan and Rich Gannon
- Recap, Gamebook

Game information

**First quarter**

- KC – Tyreek Hill 30-yard pass from Alex Smith (Cairo Santos kick), 12:03. Chiefs 7–0. **Drive: 4 plays, 43 yards, 1:56.**
- KC – Albert Wilson 6-yard pass from Alex Smith (Cairo Santos kick), 5:33. Chiefs 14–0. **Drive: 4 plays, 34 yards, 2:11.**
- LAC – Melvin Gordon 11-yard run (Younghoe Koo kick), 0:05. Chiefs 14–7. **Drive: 9 plays, 89 yards, 5:28.**

**Second quarter**

- KC – Cairo Santos 34-yard field goal, 4:30. Chiefs 17–7. **Drive: 9 plays, 37 yards, 6:09.**
- LAC – Younghoe Koo 29-yard field goal, 0:00. Chiefs 17–10. **Drive: 13 plays, 64 yards, 4:30.**

**Third quarter**

- No scoring plays.

**Fourth quarter**

- KC – Kareem Hunt 69-yard run (Cairo Santos kick), 1:49. Chiefs 24–10. **Drive: 4 plays, 80 yards, 1:16.**

**Top passers**

- KC – Alex Smith – 16/21, 155 yards, 2 TD
- LAC – Philip Rivers – 20/40, 237 yards, 3 INT

**Top rushers**

- KC – Kareem Hunt – 17 rushes, 172 yards, TD
- LAC – Melvin Gordon – 17 rushes, 79 yards, TD

**Top receivers**

- KC – Tyreek Hill – 5 receptions, 77 yards, TD
- LAC – Travis Benjamin – 5 receptions, 105 yards

**Top tacklers**

- KC – Terrance Mitchell - 9 Tackles
- LAC – Jatavis Brown - 6 Tackles, 4 Assisted

==== Week 4: vs. Philadelphia Eagles ====
Week Four: Philadelphia Eagles at Los Angeles Chargers – Game summary

Quarter	1	2	3	4	Total
**Eagles**	10	6	3	7	**26**
Chargers	0	10	0	14	**24**

at StubHub Center, Carson, California

- Date: October 1
- Game time: 1:05 p.m. PDT
- Game weather: 72 °F (22 °C), sunny
- Game attendance: 25,374
- Referee: Carl Cheffers
- TV announcers (Fox): Dick Stockton, Mark Schlereth and Shannon Spake
- Recap, Gamebook

Game information

**First quarter**

- PHI - Alshon Jeffery 8-yard pass from Carson Wentz (Jake Elliott kick), 8:00. Eagles 7–0. **Drive: 8 plays, 63 yards, 4:44.**
- PHI - Jake Elliott 45-yard field goal, 0:05. Eagles 10–0. **Drive: 11 plays, 60 yards, 5:35.**

**Second quarter**

- PHI - Jake Elliott 40-yard field goal, 6:42. Eagles 13–0. **Drive: 11 plays, 63 yards, 5:15.**
- LAC - Tyrell Williams 75-yard pass from Philip Rivers (Younghoe Koo kick), 6:32. Eagles 13–7. **Drive: 1 play, 75 yards, 0:10.**
- PHI - Jake Elliott 53-yard field goal, 4:08. Eagles 16–7. **Drive: 8 plays, 40 yards, 2:24.**
- LAC – Younghoe Koo 28-yard field goal, 0:00. Eagles 16–10. **Drive: 8 plays, 72 yards, 0:56.**

**Third quarter**

- PHI - Jake Elliott 47-yard field goal, 0:55. Eagles 19–10. **Drive: 13 plays, 70 yards, 6:51.**

**Fourth quarter**

- LAC - Austin Ekeler 35-yard rush (Younghoe Koo kick), 13:42. Eagles 19–17. **Drive: 7 plays, 60 yards, 2:13.**
- PHI - Wendell Smallwood 3-yard rush (Jake Elliott kick), 9:14. Eagles 26–17. **Drive: 7 plays, 71 yards, 4:28.**
- LAC - Hunter Henry 4-yard pass from Philip Rivers (Younghoe Koo kick), 6:44. Eagles 26–24. **Drive: 8 plays, 70 yards, 2:30.**

**Top passers**

- PHI – Carson Wentz: 17/31, 242 yards, TD
- LAC – Philip Rivers: 22/38, 347 yards, 2 TD

**Top rushers**

- PHI – LeGarrette Blount: 16 rushes, 136 yards
- LAC – Austin Ekeler: 1 rush, 35 yards, TD

**Top receivers**

- PHI – Zach Ertz: 5 receptions, 81 yards
- LAC – Keenan Allen: 5 receptions, 138 yards

**Top tacklers**

- PHI – Jordan Hicks: 8 tackles, 1 assist
- LAC – Jahleel Addae: 7 tackles, 4 assists

The Chargers play a home game at StubHub Center against the NFC East's Philadelphia Eagles. Notably, this home game turned out to be a 'road game' for the Chargers as Eagles fans took over StubHub and turned it into, as dubbed on Twitter, "Lincoln Financial Field West". In the end the Eagles won 26-24 over the Chargers.

With the loss, the Chargers' record dropped to 0-4, last place in the AFC West.

==== Week 5: at New York Giants ====
Week Five: Los Angeles Chargers at New York Giants – Game summary

Quarter	1	2	3	4	Total
**Chargers**	0	10	7	10	**27**
Giants	9	0	7	6	**22**

at MetLife Stadium, East Rutherford, New Jersey

- Date: October 8
- Game time: 1:00 p.m. EDT/10:00 a.m. PDT
- Game weather: 76 °F (24 °C), cloudy
- Game attendance: 77,373
- Referee: Jeff Triplette
- TV announcers (CBS): Ian Eagle, Dan Fouts and Evan Washburn
- Recap, Gamebook

Game information

**First quarter**

- NYG – Spencer Pulley fumble out of bounds in end zone for a Safety, 8:53. Giants 2–0.
- NYG – Orleans Darkwa 23-yard run (Aldrick Rosas kick), 2:16. Giants 9–0. **Drive: 5 plays, 64 yards, 2:19.**

**Second quarter**

- LAC – Melvin Gordon 6-yard pass from Philip Rivers (Nick Novak kick), 13:01. Giants 9–7. **Drive: 8 plays, 77 yards, 4:15.**
- LAC – Nick Novak 20-yard field goal, 0:06. Chargers 10–9. **Drive: 12 plays, 49 yards, 2:36.**

**Third quarter**

- NYG – Roger Lewis 29-yard pass from Eli Manning (Aldrick Rosas kick), 6:46. Giants 16–10. **Drive: 9 plays, 80 yards, 4:10.**
- LAC – Hunter Henry 25-yard pass from Philip Rivers (Nick Novak kick), 0:40. Chargers 17–16. **Drive: 12 plays, 92 yards, 6:06.**

**Fourth quarter**

- NYG – Odell Beckham Jr. 48-yard pass from Eli Manning (pass failed), 13:31. Giants 22–17. **Drive: 5 plays, 75 yards, 2:09.**
- LAC – Nick Novak 31-yard field goal, 4:50. Giants 22–20. **Drive: 11 plays, 48 yards, 4:15.**
- LAC – Melvin Gordon 10-yard pass from Philip Rivers (Nick Novak kick), 2:58. Chargers 27–22. **Drive: 3 plays, 11 yards, 0:48.**

**Top passers**

- LAC – Philip Rivers – 21/44, 258 yards, 3 TD, INT
- NYG – Eli Manning – 21/36, 225 yards, 2 TD, INT

**Top rushers**

- LAC – Melvin Gordon – 20 carries, 105 yards
- NYG – Orleans Darkwa – 8 carries, 69 yards, TD

**Top receivers**

- LAC – Melvin Gordon – 6 receptions, 58 yards, 2 TD
- NYG – Odell Beckham Jr. – 5 receptions, 97 yards, TD

**Top tacklers**

- LAC – Hayes Pullard - 7 Tackles, 1 Assist
- NYG – Darian Thompson - 8 Tackles, 3 Assisted

In a back-and-forth game against the Giants, the Chargers proved victorious after rallying to score 10 unanswered points to retake the lead. Four plays after Giants star receiver Odell Beckham Jr. suffered a season-ending broken ankle, Philip Rivers delivered a 10-yard touchdown pass to Melvin Gordon with just under three minutes to go, and the Los Angeles defense prevented New York from responding. With the win, the Chargers earned their first win of the season, also snapping a 9-game losing streak that dated back to their previous season in San Diego.

==== Week 6: at Oakland Raiders ====
Week Six: Los Angeles Chargers at Oakland Raiders – Game summary

Quarter	1	2	3	4	Total
**Chargers**	0	7	0	10	**17**
Raiders	7	3	0	6	**16**

at Oakland–Alameda County Coliseum, Oakland, California

- Date: October 15
- Game time: 1:25 p.m. PDT
- Game weather: 76 °F (24 °C), sunny
- Game attendance: 54,685
- Referee: Clete Blakeman
- TV announcers (CBS): Kevin Harlan and Rich Gannon
- Recap, Gamebook

Game information

**First quarter**

- OAK – Michael Crabtree 23-yard pass from Derek Carr (Giorgio Tavecchio kick), 5:04. Raiders 7–0. **Drive: 11 plays, 62 yards, 6:05.**

**Second quarter**

- LAC – Melvin Gordon 1-yard run (Nick Novak kick), 1:44. Tied 7–7. **Drive: 15 plays, 82 yards, 6:41.**
- OAK – Giorgio Tavecchio 44-yard field goal, 0:00. Raiders 10–7. **Drive: 7 plays, 34 yards, 1:44.**

**Third quarter** **Fourth quarter**

- LAC – Melvin Gordon 6-yard pass from Philip Rivers, (Nick Novak kick), 10:19. Chargers 14–10. **Drive: 10 plays, 59 yards, 4:38.**
- OAK – Cordarrelle Patterson 47 yard run (kick failed), 7:51. Raiders 16–14. **Drive: 4 plays, 65 yards, 2:28.**
- LAC – Nick Novak 32-yard field goal, 0:00. Chargers 17–16. **Drive: 11 plays, 78 yards, 4:09.**

**Top passers**

- LAC – Philip Rivers 25/36, 268 yards, 1 TD
- OAK – Derek Carr 21/30, 171 yards, 1 TD, 2 INT

**Top rushers**

- LAC – Melvin Gordon 25 rushes, 63 yards, 1 TD
- OAK – Marshawn Lynch 13 rushes, 63 yards

**Top receivers**

- LAC – Hunter Henry 5 receptions, 90 yards
- OAK – Michael Crabtree 5 receptions, 52 yards

**Top tacklers**

- LAC – Hayes Pullard 10 tackles
- OAK – T. J. Carrie 8 tackles

==== Week 7: vs. Denver Broncos ====
Week Seven: Denver Broncos at Los Angeles Chargers – Game summary

Quarter	1	2	3	4	Total
Broncos	0	0	0	0	**0**
**Chargers**	7	7	0	7	**21**

at StubHub Center, Carson, California

- Date: October 22
- Game time: 1:25 p.m. PDT
- Game weather: 90 °F (32 °C), sunny
- Game attendance: 25,388
- Referee: John Hussey
- TV announcers (CBS): Kevin Harlan, Rich Gannon and Amanda Balionis
- Recap, Gamebook

Game information

**First quarter**

- LAC – Travis Benjamin 65-yard punt return (Nick Novak kick), 7:27. Chargers 7–0.

**Second quarter**

- LAC – Austin Ekeler 1-yard pass from Philip Rivers (Nick Novak kick), 7:07. Chargers 14–0. **Drive: 9 plays, 65 yards, 5:55.**

**Third quarter**

- No scoring plays

**Fourth quarter**

- LAC – Travis Benjamin 42-yard pass from Philip Rivers (Nick Novak kick), 5:42. Chargers 21–0. **Drive: 10 plays, 92 yards, 6:53.**

**Top passers**

- DEN – Trevor Siemian – 25/35, 207 yards, INT
- LAC – Philip Rivers – 15/26, 183 yards, 2 TD

**Top rushers**

- DEN – C. J. Anderson – 10 rushes, 44 yards
- LAC – Austin Ekeler – 7 rushes, 38 yards, 1 receiving TD

**Top receivers**

- DEN – A. J. Derby – 6 receptions, 66 yards
- LAC —Hunter Henry – 4 receptions, 73 yards

**Top tacklers**

- DEN – Todd Davis - 7 Tackles, 3 Assisted
- LAC – Jahleel Addae - 6 Tackles, 3 Assisted

With their first home victory as the L.A. Chargers, Philip Rivers went 15/26 for 183 passing yard and 2 touchdowns, shutting out the Denver Broncos. It was their first home win in Los Angeles since December 18, 1960.

==== Week 8: at New England Patriots ====
Week Eight: Los Angeles Chargers at New England Patriots – Game summary

Quarter	1	2	3	4	Total
Chargers	7	0	0	6	**13**
**Patriots**	0	15	3	3	**21**

at Gillette Stadium, Foxborough, Massachusetts

- Date: October 29
- Game time: 1:00 p.m. EDT/10:00 a.m. PDT
- Game weather: 62 °F (17 °C), rain
- Game attendance: 65,878
- Referee: Pete Morelli
- TV announcers (CBS): Ian Eagle, Dan Fouts and Evan Washburn
- Recap, Gamebook

Game information

**First quarter**

- LAC – Melvin Gordon 87-yard run (Nick Novak kick), 6:15. Chargers 7–0. **Drive: 2 plays, 88 yards, 0:53.**

**Second quarter**

- NE – Rob Gronkowski 2-yard pass from Tom Brady (Stephen Gostkowski kick), 14:56. Tied 7–7. **Drive: 14 plays, 77 yards, 6:19.**
- NE – Travis Benjamin tackled in end zone by Brandon King for a safety, 9:08. Patriots 9–7.
- NE – Stephen Gostkowski 25-yard field goal, 4:06. Patriots 12–7. **Drive: 11 plays, 51 yards, 5:02.**
- NE – Stephen Gostkowski 36-yard field goal, 0:20. Patriots 15–7. **Drive: 7 plays, 73 yards, 1:40.**

**Third quarter**

- NE – Stephen Gostkowski 43-yard field goal, 5:25. Patriots 18–7. **Drive: 12 plays, 52 yards, 5:27.**

**Fourth quarter**

- LAC – Travis Benjamin 24-yard pass from Philip Rivers (pass failed), 8:30. Patriots 18–13. **Drive: 3 plays, 67 yards, 1:06.**
- NE – Stephen Gostkowski 26-yard field goal, 1:08. Patriots 21–13. **Drive: 10 plays, 58 yards, 3:33.**

**Top passers**

- LAC – Philip Rivers – 17/30, 212 yards, TD, INT
- NE – Tom Brady – 32/47, 333 yards, TD

**Top rushers**

- LAC – Melvin Gordon – 14 rushes, 132 yards, TD
- NE – Dion Lewis – 15 rushes, 44 yards

**Top receivers**

- LAC – Travis Benjamin – 5 receptions, 64 yards, TD
- NE – James White – 5 receptions, 85 yards

**Top tacklers**

- LAC – Adrian Phillips – 12 tackles
- NE – Kyle Van Noy – 6 tackles

==== Week 10: at Jacksonville Jaguars ====
Week Ten: Los Angeles Chargers at Jacksonville Jaguars – Game summary

Quarter	1	2	3	4	OT	Total
Chargers	0	7	7	3	0	**17**
**Jaguars**	6	0	8	3	3	**20**

at EverBank Field, Jacksonville, Florida

- Date: November 12
- Game time: 1:00 p.m. EST/10:00 a.m. PST
- Game weather: 76 °F (24 °C), partly cloudy
- Game attendance: 60,835
- Referee: Ronald Torbert
- TV announcers (CBS): Andrew Catalon and James Lofton
- Recap, Gamebook

Game information

**First quarter**

- JAX – Corey Grant 56-yard run (Josh Lambo kick), 0:34. Jaguars 6–0. **Drive: 8 plays, 90 yards, 3:56.**

**Second quarter**

- LAC – Austin Ekeler 28-yard pass from Philip Rivers (Nick Novak kick), 0:56. Chargers 7–6. **Drive: 7 plays, 87 yards, 2:59.**

**Third quarter**

- LAC – Austin Ekeler 22-yard pass from Philip Rivers (Nick Novak kick), 10:37. Chargers 14–6. **Drive: 6 plays, 76 yards, 3:23.**
- JAX – Marqise Lee 6-yard pass from Blake Bortles (Blake Bortles to Marqise Lee pass succeeded), 2:10. Tied 14–14. **Drive: 11 plays, 84 yards, 4:12.**

**Fourth quarter**

- LAC – Nick Novak 50-yard field goal, 10:38. Chargers 17–14. **Drive: 7 plays, 45 yards, 3:19.**
- JAX – Josh Lambo 34-yard field goal, 0:07. Tied 17–17. **Drive: 6 plays, 36 yards, 0:53.**

**Overtime**

- JAX – Josh Lambo 30-yard field goal, 3:17. Jaguars 20–17. **Drive: 4 plays, 5 yards, 1:59.**

**Top passers**

- LAC – Philip Rivers – 21/37, 235 yards, 2 TD, INT
- JAX – Blake Bortles – 28/51, 273 yards, TD, 2 INT

**Top rushers**

- LAC – Austin Ekeler – 10 rushes, 42 yards
- JAX – Corey Grant – 1 rush, 56 yards

**Top receivers**

- LAC – Austin Ekeler – 5 receptions, 77 yards, 2 TD
- JAX – Allen Hurns – 7 receptions, 70 yards

**Top tacklers**

- LAC – Denzel Perryman – 8 tackles, 1 assist
- JAX – Myles Jack – 8 tackles, 1 assist

==== Week 11: vs. Buffalo Bills ====
Week Eleven: Buffalo Bills at Los Angeles Chargers – Game summary

Quarter	1	2	3	4	Total
Bills	7	0	3	14	**24**
**Chargers**	10	27	10	7	**54**

at StubHub Center, Carson, California

- Date: November 19
- Game time: 1:05 p.m. PST
- Game weather: 76 °F (24 °C), partly cloudy
- Game attendance: 25,015
- Referee: John Parry
- TV announcers (Fox): Chris Myers, Daryl Johnston and Laura Okmin
- Recap, Gamebook

Game information

**First quarter**

- LAC – Korey Toomer 59-yard interception return (Nick Novak kick), 11:44. Chargers 7–0. **Drive: 6 plays, 34 yards, 3:16.**
- BUF – LeSean McCoy 27-yard run (Stephen Hauschka kick), 9:02. Tied 7–7. **Drive: 2 plays, 64 yards, 0:48.**
- LAC – Nick Novak 33-yard field goal, 3:57. Chargers 10–7. **Drive: 12 plays, 59 yards, 5:05.**

**Second quarter**

- LAC – Keenan Allen 21-yard pass from Philip Rivers (Nick Novak kick), 12:53. Chargers 17–7. **Drive: 6 plays, 46 yards, 3:16.**
- LAC – Keenan Allen 2-yard pass from Philip Rivers (Nick Novak kick), 10:32. Chargers 24–7. **Drive: 4 plays, 15 yards, 2:11.**
- LAC – Nick Novak 28-yard field goal, 4:55. Chargers 27–7. **Drive: 9 plays, 66 yards, 4:14.**
- LAC – Melvin Gordon 10-yard run (Nick Novak kick), 1:09. Chargers 34–7. **Drive: 5 plays, 57 yards, 2:37.**
- LAC – Nick Novak 39-yard field goal, 0:00. Chargers 37–7. **Drive: 6 plays, 33 yards, 0:35.**

**Third quarter**

- LAC – Nick Novak 28-yard field goal, 10:21. Chargers 40–7. **Drive: 11 plays, 65 yards, 4:39.**
- BUF – Stephen Hauschka 50-yard field goal, 7:34. Chargers 40–10. **Drive: 8 plays, 46 yards, 2:47.**
- LAC – Melvin Ingram 39-yard fumble return (Nick Novak kick), 1:51. Chargers 47–10. **Drive: 8 plays, 22 yards, 2:49.**

**Fourth quarter**

- BUF – LeSean McCoy 12-yard pass from Tyrod Taylor (Stephen Hauschka kick), 13:51. Chargers 47–17. **Drive: 8 plays, 78 yards, 3:00.**
- LAC – Austin Ekeler 21-yard run (Nick Novak kick), 7:57. Chargers 54–17. **Drive: 9 plays, 58 yards, 5:54.**
- BUF – Tyrod Taylor 2-yard run (Stephen Hauschka kick), 4:49. Chargers 54–24. **Drive: 11 plays, 75 yards, 3:08.**

**Top passers**

- BUF – Tyrod Taylor – 15/25, 158 yards, TD
- LAC – Philip Rivers – 20/32, 251 yards, 2 TD

**Top rushers**

- BUF – LeSean McCoy – 13 carries, 114 yards, TD
- LAC – Melvin Gordon – 20 carries, 80 yards, TD

**Top receivers**

- BUF – Zay Jones – 4 receptions, 68 yards
- LAC – Keenan Allen – 12 receptions, 159 yards, 2 TD

**Top tacklers**

- BUF – Preston Brown - 11 Tackles, 2 Assisted
- LAC – Adrian Phillips - 6 Tackles

The Chargers handily routed the Bills, partly thanks to Buffalo's now-infamous decision to start rookie quarterback Nathan Peterman, who threw five interceptions to the Chargers defense in the first half alone before being pulled for previous starter Tyrod Taylor. With the win, Los Angeles snapped its 2-game losing streak to improve to 4–6.

==== Week 12: at Dallas Cowboys ====
NFL on Thanksgiving Day

Week Twelve: Los Angeles Chargers at Dallas Cowboys – Game summary

Quarter	1	2	3	4	Total
**Chargers**	0	3	13	12	**28**
Cowboys	0	0	0	6	**6**

at AT&T Stadium, Arlington, Texas

- Date: November 23
- Game time: 3:30 p.m. CST/1:30 p.m. PST
- Game weather: Played indoors (retractable roof closed)
- Game attendance: 93,012
- Referee: Jerome Boger
- TV announcers (CBS): Jim Nantz, Tony Romo and Tracy Wolfson
- Recap, Gamebook

Game information

**First quarter**

- No scoring plays.

**Second quarter**

- LAC – Nick Novak 22-yard field goal, 1:56. Chargers 3–0. **Drive: 14 plays, 66 yards, 6:59.**

**Third quarter**

- LAC – Hunter Henry 3-yard pass from Philip Rivers (kick failed), 8:59. Chargers 9–0. **Drive: 10 plays, 77 yards, 6:01.**
- LAC – Tyrell Williams 27-yard pass from Philip Rivers (Drew Kaser kick), 1:46. Chargers 16–0. **Drive: 8 plays, 92 yards, 3:59.**

**Fourth quarter**

- DAL – Rod Smith 2-yard run (pass failed), 12:48. Chargers 16–6. **Drive: 9 plays, 81 yards, 3:58.**
- LAC – Keenan Allen 42-yard pass from Philip Rivers (kick failed), 9:58. Chargers 22–6. **Drive: 6 plays, 75 yards, 2:50.**
- LAC – Desmond King 90-yard interception return (kick failed), 7:41. Chargers 28–6.

**Top passers**

- LAC – Philip Rivers – 27/33, 434 yards, 3 TD
- DAL – Dak Prescott – 20/27, 179 yards, 2 INT

**Top rushers**

- LAC – Melvin Gordon – 21 carries, 65 yards
- DAL – Rod Smith – 9 carries, 41 yards, TD

**Top receivers**

- LAC – Keenan Allen – 11 receptions, 172 yards, TD
- DAL – Jason Witten – 7 receptions, 44 yards

**Top tacklers**

- LAC – Jahleel Addae - 5 Tackles, 2 Assisted
- DAL – Jaylon Smith - 7 Tackles, 1 Assist

Philip Rivers threw three touchdowns in the second half, and Dak Prescott threw two interceptions in the fourth quarter, one of which was returned 90 yards by rookie Desmond King for a touchdown, for a second straight win. With the win and the Chiefs losing on Sunday, the Chargers ended up one game out of first in the AFC West. This was the first time since 2010 that the Chargers had worn the alternate powder blue jersey introduced in 2007 against an NFC team and the first time ever it was worn on the road.

==== Week 13: vs. Cleveland Browns ====
Week Thirteen: Cleveland Browns at Los Angeles Chargers – Game summary

Quarter	1	2	3	4	Total
Browns	0	7	0	3	**10**
**Chargers**	0	9	10	0	**19**

at StubHub Center, Carson, California

- Date: December 3
- Game time: 1:05 p.m. PST
- Game weather: 68 °F (20 °C), sunny
- Game attendance: 25,320
- Referee: Walt Coleman
- TV announcers (CBS): Spero Dedes and Adam Archuleta
- Recap, Gamebook

Game information

**First quarter**

- No scoring plays.

**Second quarter**

- LAC – Travis Coons 21-yard field goal, 9:03. Chargers 3–0. **Drive: 10 plays, 60 yards, 4:25.**
- LAC – Travis Coons 40-yard field goal, 3:45. Chargers 6–0. **Drive: 7 plays, 38 yards, 3:29.**
- CLE – David Njoku 28-yard pass from DeShone Kizer (Zane Gonzalez kick), 1:55. Browns 7–6. **Drive: 5 plays, 65 yards, 1:50.**
- LAC – Travis Coons 22-yard field goal, 0:00. Chargers 9–7. **Drive: 11 plays, 75 yards, 1:55.**

**Third quarter**

- LAC – Keenan Allen 7-yard pass from Philip Rivers (Travis Coons kick), 10:35. Chargers 16–7. **Drive: 10 plays, 78 yards, 4:25.**
- LAC – Travis Coons 27-yard field goal, 1:02. Chargers 19–7. **Drive: 12 plays, 66 yards, 7:03.**

**Fourth quarter**

- CLE – Zane Gonzalez 35-yard field goal, 12:03. Chargers 19–10. **Drive: 11 plays, 58 yards, 3:59.**

**Top passers**

- CLE – DeShone Kizer – 15/32, 215 yards, TD, INT
- LAC – Philip Rivers – 31/43, 344 yards, TD

**Top rushers**

- CLE – DeShone Kizer – 5 carries, 46 yards
- LAC – Melvin Gordon – 19 carries, 77 yards

**Top receivers**

- CLE – Josh Gordon – 4 receptions, 85 yards
- LAC – Keenan Allen – 10 receptions, 105 yards, TD

**Top tacklers**

- CLE – Joe Schobert - 7 Tackles, 5 Assists
- LAC – Joey Bosa - 7 Tackles

The Chargers, for the second straight year in a row, faced a winless Browns team. Former Browns kicker Travis Coons, signed off the Chargers' practice squad in place of an injured Nick Novak, kicked four field goals in the game. Keenan Allen caught a touchdown, and the defense forced two fourth-quarter turnovers to seal the game. With the win, along with the Chiefs' loss to the Jets earlier and the Raiders beating the Giants, the Chargers moved into a three-way tie for first place in the AFC West.

==== Week 14: vs. Washington Redskins ====
Week Fourteen: Washington Redskins at Los Angeles Chargers – Game summary

Quarter	1	2	3	4	Total
Redskins	0	6	0	7	**13**
**Chargers**	13	10	7	0	**30**

at StubHub Center, Carson, California

- Date: December 10
- Game time: 1:05 p.m. PST
- Game weather: 81 °F (27 °C), partly cloudy
- Game attendance: 25,393
- Referee: Jeff Triplette
- TV announcers (CBS): Ian Eagle, Dan Fouts and Evan Washburn
- Recap, Gamebook

Game information

**First quarter**

- LAC – Travis Coons 33-yard field goal, 9:53. Chargers 3–0. **Drive: 10 plays, 60 yards, 5:07.**
- LAC – Hunter Henry 8-yard pass from Philip Rivers (Travis Coons kick), 2:34. Chargers 10–0. **Drive: 10 plays, 92 yards, 4:24.**
- LAC – Travis Coons 21-yard field goal, 0:03. Chargers 13–0. **Drive: 6 plays, 26 yards, 2:19.**

**Second quarter**

- WAS – Vernon Davis 23-yard pass from Kirk Cousins (kick failed), 10:13. Chargers 13–6. **Drive: 9 plays, 77 yards, 4:50.**
- LAC – Tyrell Williams 75-yard pass from Philip Rivers (Travis Coons kick), 10:02. Chargers 20–6. **Drive: 1 plays, 75 yards, 0:11.**
- LAC – Travis Coons 36-yard field goal, 2:23. Chargers 23–6. **Drive: 8 plays, 45 yards, 4:03.**

**Third quarter**

- LAC – Melvin Gordon 1-yard run (Travis Coons kick), 6:17. Chargers 30–6. **Drive: 3 plays, 55 yards, 1:29.**

**Fourth quarter**

- WAS – Bashaud Breeland 96-yard interception return (Nick Rose kick), 2:36. Chargers 30–13.

**Top passers**

- WAS – Kirk Cousins – 14/27, 151 yards, TD, INT
- LAC – Philip Rivers – 18/31, 319 yards, 2 TD

**Top rushers**

- WAS – Samaje Perine – 17 carries, 45 yards
- LAC – Melvin Gordon – 22 carries, 78 yards, TD

**Top receivers**

- WAS – Samaje Perine – 4 receptions, 7 yards
- LAC – Keenan Allen – 6 receptions, 111 yards

**Top tacklers**

- WAS – Deshazor Everett - 6 Tackles, 5 Assists
- LAC – Desmond King - 7 Tackles, 3 Assists

==== Week 15: at Kansas City Chiefs ====
Week Fifteen: Los Angeles Chargers at Kansas City Chiefs – Game summary

Quarter	1	2	3	4	Total
Chargers	0	6	7	0	**13**
**Chiefs**	3	7	10	10	**30**

at Arrowhead Stadium, Kansas City, Missouri

- Date: December 16
- Game time: 7:25 p.m. CST/5:25 p.m. PST
- Game weather: 53 °F (12 °C), cloudy
- Game attendance: 75,011
- Referee: Walt Anderson
- TV announcers (NFLN): Greg Gumbel, Trent Green and Jamie Erdahl
- Recap, Gamebook

Game information

**First quarter**

- KC – Harrison Butker 31-yard field goal, 0:01. Chiefs 3–0. **Drive: 15 plays, 82 yards, 8:55.**

**Second quarter**

- KC – Tyreek Hill 64-yard pass from Alex Smith (Harrison Butker kick), 6:39. Chiefs 10–0. **Drive: 4 plays, 80 yards, 1:50.**
- LAC – Melvin Gordon 2-yard run (kick failed), 2:05. Chiefs 10–6. **Drive: 10 plays, 75 yards, 4:30.**

**Third quarter**

- LAC – Antonio Gates 10-yard pass from Philip Rivers (Travis Coons kick), 9:26. Chargers 13–10. **Drive: 6 plays, 88 yards, 3:27.**
- KC – Kareem Hunt 3-yard pass from Alex Smith (Harrison Butker kick), 2:14. Chiefs 17–13. **Drive: 12 plays, 69 yards, 7:13.**
- KC – Harrison Butker 24-yard field goal, 0:31. Chiefs 20–13. **Drive: 4 plays, 0 yards, 1:12.**

**Fourth quarter**

- KC – Harrison Butker 51-yard field goal, 11:04. Chiefs 23–13. **Drive: 6 plays, 23 yards, 3:28.**
- KC – Kareem Hunt 5-yard run (Harrison Butker kick), 4:01. Chiefs 30–13. **Drive: 7 plays, 65 yards, 4:26.**

**Top passers**

- LAC – Philip Rivers – 20/36, 227 yards, TD, 3 INT
- KC – Alex Smith – 23/30, 231 yards, 2 TD

**Top rushers**

- LAC – Melvin Gordon – 19 rushes, 78 yards, TD
- KC – Kareem Hunt – 24 rushes, 155 yards, TD

**Top receivers**

- LAC – Melvin Gordon – 6 receptions, 91 yards
- KC – Tyreek Hill – 5 receptions, 88 yards, TD

**Top tacklers**

- LAC – Adrian Phillips - 8 Tackles
- KC – Derrick Johnson - 6 Tackles

==== Week 16: at New York Jets ====
Week Sixteen: Los Angeles Chargers at New York Jets – Game summary

Quarter	1	2	3	4	Total
**Chargers**	0	7	7	0	**14**
Jets	0	0	7	0	**7**

at MetLife Stadium, East Rutherford, New Jersey

- Date: December 24
- Game time: 1:00 p.m. EST/10:00 a.m. PST
- Game weather: 40 °F (4 °C)
- Game attendance: 77,562
- Referee: Clete Blakeman
- TV announcers (CBS): Ian Eagle, Dan Fouts and Evan Washburn
- Recap, Gamebook

Game information

**First quarter**

- No scoring plays.

**Second quarter**

- LAC – Antonio Gates 3-yard pass from Philip Rivers (Nick Rose kick), 8:55. Chargers 7–0. **Drive: 12 plays, 71 yards, 5:46.**

**Third quarter**

- NYJ – Bilal Powell 57-yard run (Chandler Catanzaro kick), 10:00. Tied 7–7. **Drive: 3 plays, 63 yards, 1:22.**
- LAC – Melvin Gordon 1-yard run (Nick Rose kick), 4:57. Chargers 14–7. **Drive: 8 plays, 75 yards, 5:03.**

**Fourth quarter**

- No scoring plays.

**Top passers**

- LAC – Philip Rivers – 22/40, 290 yards, TD
- NYJ – Bryce Petty – 15/28, 119 yards, INT

**Top rushers**

- LAC – Melvin Gordon – 19 carries, 81 yards, TD
- NYJ – Bilal Powell – 19 carries, 145 yards, TD

**Top receivers**

- LAC – Robby Anderson – 5 receptions, 51 yards
- NYJ – Antonio Gates – 6 receptions, 81 yards, TD

**Top tacklers**

- LAC – Korey Toomer and Jahleel Addae - 5 Tackles and 2 Assists each
- NYJ – Darron Lee - 4 Tackles and 4 Assists

==== Week 17: vs. Oakland Raiders ====
Week Seventeen: Oakland Raiders at Los Angeles Chargers – Game summary

Quarter	1	2	3	4	Total
Raiders	0	10	0	0	**10**
**Chargers**	0	20	10	0	**30**

at StubHub Center, Carson, California

- Date: December 31
- Game time: 1:25 p.m. PST
- Game weather: 62 °F (17 °C), hazy
- Game attendance: 25,430
- Referee: Ed Hochuli
- TV announcers (CBS): Kevin Harlan and Rich Gannon
- Recap, Gamebook

Game information

S **First quarter**

- No scoring plays.

**Second quarter**

- LAC – Keenan Allen 27-yard fumble recovery (Nick Rose kick), 13:09. Chargers 7–0. **Drive: 9 plays, 99 yards, 4:27.**
- OAK – Amari Cooper 87-yard pass from Derek Carr (Giorgio Tavecchio kick), 11:38. Tied 7–7. **Drive: 4 plays, 75 yards, 1:31.**
- OAK – Giorgio Tavecchio 40-yard field goal, 7:27. Raiders 10–7. **Drive: 4 plays, 8 yards, 1:06.**
- LAC – Tyrell Williams 56-yard pass from Philip Rivers (Nick Rose kick), 5:12. Chargers 14–10. **Drive: 4 plays, 75 yards, 2:15.**
- LAC – Keenan Allen 6-yard pass from Philip Rivers (kick blocked), 0:24. Chargers 20–10. **Drive: 8 plays, 77 yards, 1:24.**

**Third quarter**

- LAC – Nick Rose 25-yard field goal, 10:39. Chargers 23–10. **Drive: 10 plays, 68 yards, 4:21.**
- LAC – Travis Benjamin 62-yard pass from Philip Rivers (Nick Rose kick), 0:53. Chargers 30–10. **Drive: 9 plays, 82 yards, 4:50.**

**Fourth quarter**

- No scoring plays.

**Top passers**

- OAK – Derek Carr – 19/28, 243 yards, TD, INT
- LAC – Philip Rivers – 28/37, 387 yards, 3 TD

**Top rushers**

- OAK – Marshawn Lynch – 19 carries, 101 yards
- LAC – Melvin Gordon – 17 carries, 93 yards

**Top receivers**

- OAK – Seth Roberts – 5 receptions, 48 yards
- LAC – Keenan Allen – 9 receptions, 133 yards, 1 TD

**Top tacklers**

- OAK –
- LAC –

=== Standings ===
==== Division ====
AFC West
	W	L	T	PCT	DIV	CONF	PF	PA	STK
^{(4)} Kansas City Chiefs	10	6	0	.625	5–1	8–4	415	339	W4
Los Angeles Chargers	9	7	0	.563	3–3	6–6	355	272	W2
Oakland Raiders	6	10	0	.375	2–4	5–7	301	373	L4
Denver Broncos	5	11	0	.313	2–4	4–8	289	382	L2

==== Conference ====
AFC
#	Team	Division	W	L	T	PCT	DIV	CONF	SOS	SOV	STK
**Division leaders**
1 (Note: New England claimed the No. 1 seed over Pittsburgh based on head-to-head victory.)	New England Patriots	East	13	3	0	.813	5–1	10–2	.484	.466	W3
2	Pittsburgh Steelers	North	13	3	0	.813	6–0	10–2	.453	.423	W2
3 (Note: Jacksonville claimed the No. 3 seed over Kansas City based on conference record.)	Jacksonville Jaguars	South	10	6	0	.625	4–2	9–3	.434	.394	L2
4	Kansas City Chiefs	West	10	6	0	.625	5–1	8–4	.477	.481	W4
**Wild Cards**
5 (Note: Tennessee finished ahead of Buffalo, Baltimore and Los Angeles Chargers based on conference record, claiming the No. 5 seed. Buffalo and Baltimore finished ahead of Los Angeles Chargers based on conference record. Buffalo claimed the No. 6 seed over Baltimore based on strength of victory.)	Tennessee Titans	South	9	7	0	.563	5–1	8–4	.434	.396	W1
6	Buffalo Bills	East	9	7	0	.563	3–3	7–5	.492	.396	W1
**Did not qualify for the postseason**
7	Baltimore Ravens	North	9	7	0	.563	3–3	7–5	.441	.299	L1
8	Los Angeles Chargers	West	9	7	0	.563	3–3	6–6	.457	.347	W2
9	Cincinnati Bengals	North	7	9	0	.438	3–3	6–6	.465	.321	W2
10 (Note: Oakland finished ahead of Miami based on head-to-head victory.)	Oakland Raiders	West	6	10	0	.375	2–4	5–7	.512	.396	L4
11	Miami Dolphins	East	6	10	0	.375	2–4	5–7	.543	.531	L3
12 (Note: Denver finished ahead of the New York Jets based on head-to-head victory.)	Denver Broncos	West	5	11	0	.313	2–4	4–8	.492	.413	L2
13	New York Jets	East	5	11	0	.313	2–4	5–7	.520	.438	L4
14 (Note: Indianapolis finished ahead of Houston based on head-to-head sweep.)	Indianapolis Colts	South	4	12	0	.250	2–4	3–9	.480	.219	W1
15	Houston Texans	South	4	12	0	.250	1–5	3–9	.516	.375	L6
16	Cleveland Browns	North	0	16	0	.000	0–6	0–12	.520	–	L16
**Tiebreakers** (Note: When breaking ties for three or more teams under the NFL's rules, they are first broken within divisions, then comparing only the highest ranked remaining team from each division.)
