= Kyle Emanuel =

American football player (born 1991)

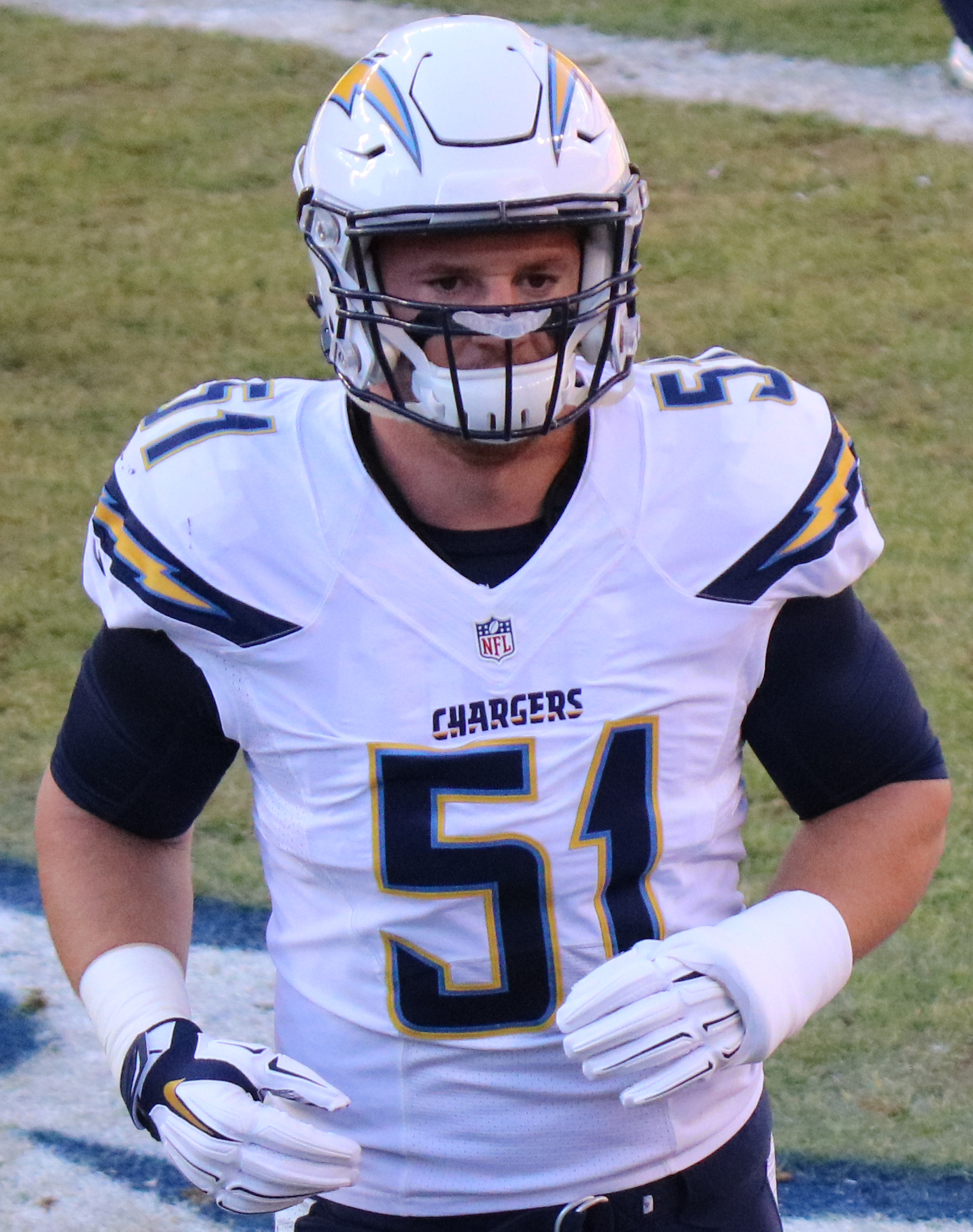
- Emanuel with the San Diego Chargers in 2015

No. 51, 52, 56
- Position: Linebacker

Personal information
- Born: August 16, 1991 (age 35); Schuyler, Nebraska, U.S.
- Listed height: 6 ft 3 in (1.91 m)
- Listed weight: 250 lb (113 kg)

Career information
- High school: Schuyler Central
- College: North Dakota State (2010–2014)
- NFL draft: 2015: 5th round, 153rd overall pick

Career history
- San Diego / Los Angeles Chargers (2015–2018); Las Vegas Raiders (2020); Houston Texans (2020)

Awards and highlights
- 4× FCS national champion (2011–2014); Buck Buchanan Award (2014)

Career NFL statistics
- Total tackles: 150
- Sacks: 4.0
- Pass deflections: 5
- Interceptions: 2
- Forced fumbles: 1
- Fumble recoveries: 2
- Defensive touchdowns: 1
- Stats at Pro Football Reference

Kyle Emanuel (born August 16, 1991) is an American former professional football player who was a linebacker in the National Football League (NFL). He played college football for the North Dakota State Bison and won four straight FCS championships with the team. He was selected by the San Diego Chargers in the fifth round of the 2015 NFL draft. He won the Buck Buchanan Award in 2014.

== Professional career ==
=== Pre-draft ===
On November 28, 2014, it was announced that Emanuel had accepted his invitation to play in the 2015 East–West Shrine Game. He was a part of Jim Zorn's West team that lost the 19–3 to the East. Emanuel attended the NFL Scouting Combine and completed all of the combine and positional drills.

External videos
- Kyle Emanuel’s NFL Combine Workout

On March 26, 2015, Emanuel participated at North Dakota State's pro day, but opted to stand on his combine numbers and only performed positional drills. He also attended pre-draft visits with the Pittsburgh Steelers, Cleveland Browns, and Minnesota Vikings. At the conclusion of the pre-draft process, Emanuel's draft projections from NFL draft experts and scouts varied from as early as the third round to as late to the fifth or sixth rounds. He was ranked as the 16th-best outside linebacker prospect in the draft by DraftScout.com.

Pre-draft measurables
Height	Weight	Arm length	Hand span	40-yard dash	10-yard split	20-yard split	20-yard shuttle	Three-cone drill	Vertical jump	Broad jump	Bench press
6 ft 3 1/4 in (1.91 m)	255 lb (116 kg)	31 in (0.79 m)	9 3/8 in (0.24 m)	4.77 s	1.79 s	2.69 s	4.25 s	7.10 s	34 in (0.86 m)	10 ft 0 in (3.05 m)	27 reps
All values from NFL Combine

=== San Diego / Los Angeles Chargers ===
==== 2015 ====
The San Diego Chargers selected Emanuel in the fifth round (153rd overall) of the 2015 NFL draft. Emanuel was the 19th linebacker drafted in 2015. On May 14, 2015, the Chargers signed Emanuel to a four-year, $2.49 million contract that includes a signing bonus of $218,572.

Throughout training camp, Emanuel competed to be a backup outside linebacker against Tourek Williams, Cordarro Law, Colton Underwood, Brock Hekking, and Ryan Mueller. Head coach Mike McCoy named Emanuel the fourth outside linebacker on the depth chart to begin the regular season, behind Melvin Ingram, Jeremiah Attaochu, and Cordarro Law.

He made his professional regular season debut and first career start in the Chargers' season-opener against the Detroit Lions and recorded three combined tackles, deflected a pass, made his first career interception, and also made his first career sack in their 33–28 victory. Emanuel made his first career sack and interception on Lions' quarterback Matthew Stafford. In Week 8, he collected a season-high four combined tackles in the Chargers' 29–26 loss at the Baltimore Ravens. On December 20, 2015, Emanuel recorded two solo tackles before exiting the Chargers' 30–14 win against the Miami Dolphins due to a concussion. He remained inactive for their Week 16 loss against the Oakland Raiders due to the concussion. He finished his rookie season in 2015 with 25 combined tackles (16 solo), one interception, one sack, and a pass deflection in 15 games and two starts.

==== 2016 ====
Emanuel entered training camp in 2016 as a backup outside linebacker and competed for a primary backup role against Tourek Williams. Head coach Mike McCoy named Emanuel a starting outside linebacker to begin the regular season, replacing Jeremiah Attachou. He started alongside Melvin Ingram and inside linebackers Manti Te'o and Denzel Perryman.

Emanuel was temporarily moved to inside linebacker during the 2016 season after season-ending injuries to Manti Te’o and Nick Dzubnar. In Week 13, Emanuel collected a season-high eight combined tackles in the Chargers’ 28–21 loss to the Tampa Bay Buccaneers. He finished his second season in 2016 with 58 combined tackles (36 solo), a pass deflection, one forced fumble, and was credited with half a sack in 16 games and 11 starts.

==== 2017 ====
On January 1, 2017, the Los Angeles Chargers fired head coach Mike McCoy after they finished with a 5–11 record. Defensive coordinator Gus Bradley opted to switch the base defense from a base 3–4 defense to a base 4–3 defense. Throughout training camp, Emanuel competed to be a starting outside linebacker against Jeremiah Attachou, Jatavis Brown, and Korey Toomer. Head coach Anthony Lynn named Emanuel the starting strongside linebacker to begin the 2017 regular season, alongside Jatavis Brown and middle linebacker Toomer.

External videos
- Kyle Emanuel intercepts pass by Matt Stafford

In Week 7, Emanuel collected a season-high four solo tackles during a 21–0 win against the Denver Broncos. On December 10, 2017, Emanuel recorded two solo tackles, broke up a pass, and made his second career interception in the Chargers’ 30–13 win against the Washington Redskins in Week 14. A hit by Melvin Ingram caused an errant pass by Stafford and was intercepted by Emanuel in the third quarter. He finished the 2017 NFL season with 34 combined tackles (21 solo), three pass deflections, 1.5 sacks, and one interception in 16 games and 11 starts.

==== 2018 ====
Emanuel entered training camp slated as the starting strong side linebacker, but saw minor competition for the role from rookies Uchenna Nwosu and Kyzir White. Head coach Anthony Lynn named Emanuel the starter to begin the regular season, alongside Jatavis Brown and middle linebacker Denzel Perryman.

On April 4, 2019, Emanuel announced his retirement from the NFL.

=== Las Vegas Raiders ===
Emanuel came out of retirement to sign with the Las Vegas Raiders on August 23, 2020. He was released on September 5, and signed to the practice squad the next day. Emanuel was elevated to the active roster on September 26 for the team's Week 3 game against the New England Patriots, and reverted to the practice squad after the game.

=== Houston Texans ===
On October 12, 2020, Emanuel was signed by the Houston Texans off the Raiders practice squad. He was placed on injured reserve on November 9. Emanuel was activated on December 5.

== NFL career statistics ==
Legend
**Bold**	Career high

=== Regular season ===
Year	Team	Games		Tackles					Interceptions					Fumbles			
Year	Team	GP	GS	Cmb	Solo	Ast	Sck	TFL	Int	Yds	TD	Lng	PD	FF	FR	Yds	TD
2015	SDG	15	3	25	16	9	1.0	3	**1**	0	0	0	1	0	0	0	0
2016	SDG	**16**	**11**	**58**	**36**	**22**	0.5	3	0	0	0	0	1	**1**	**1**	0	0
2017	LAC	**16**	**11**	34	21	13	**1.5**	1	**1**	**23**	0	**23**	**3**	0	0	0	0
2018	LAC	**16**	7	30	21	9	1.0	**4**	0	0	0	0	0	0	**1**	**18**	**1**
2020	LVR	1	0	0	0	0	0.0	0	0	0	0	0	0	0	0	0	0
2020	HOU	7	0	3	1	2	0.0	0	0	0	0	0	0	0	0	0	0
Total		71	32	150	95	55	4.0	11	2	23	0	23	5	1	2	18	1

=== Playoffs ===
Year	Team	Games		Tackles					Interceptions					Fumbles			
Year	Team	GP	GS	Cmb	Solo	Ast	Sck	TFL	Int	Yds	TD	Lng	PD	FF	FR	Yds	TD
2018	LAC	**2**	0	**7**	**2**	**5**	0.0	0	0	0	0	0	0	0	0	0	0
Total		2	0	7	2	5	0.0	0	0	0	0	0	0	0	0	0	0

== Personal life ==
In 2019 Emanuel was one of the Hosts of the NDSU Bison Pregame Show on KVLY (NBC). Emanuel worked as freelance broadcaster with KVLY appearing in the NDSU Pre Game Show and the Halftime report. In 2022, Emanuel married attorney and former Miss North Dakota Jacky Arness.
