= Denzel Perryman =

American football player (born 1992)

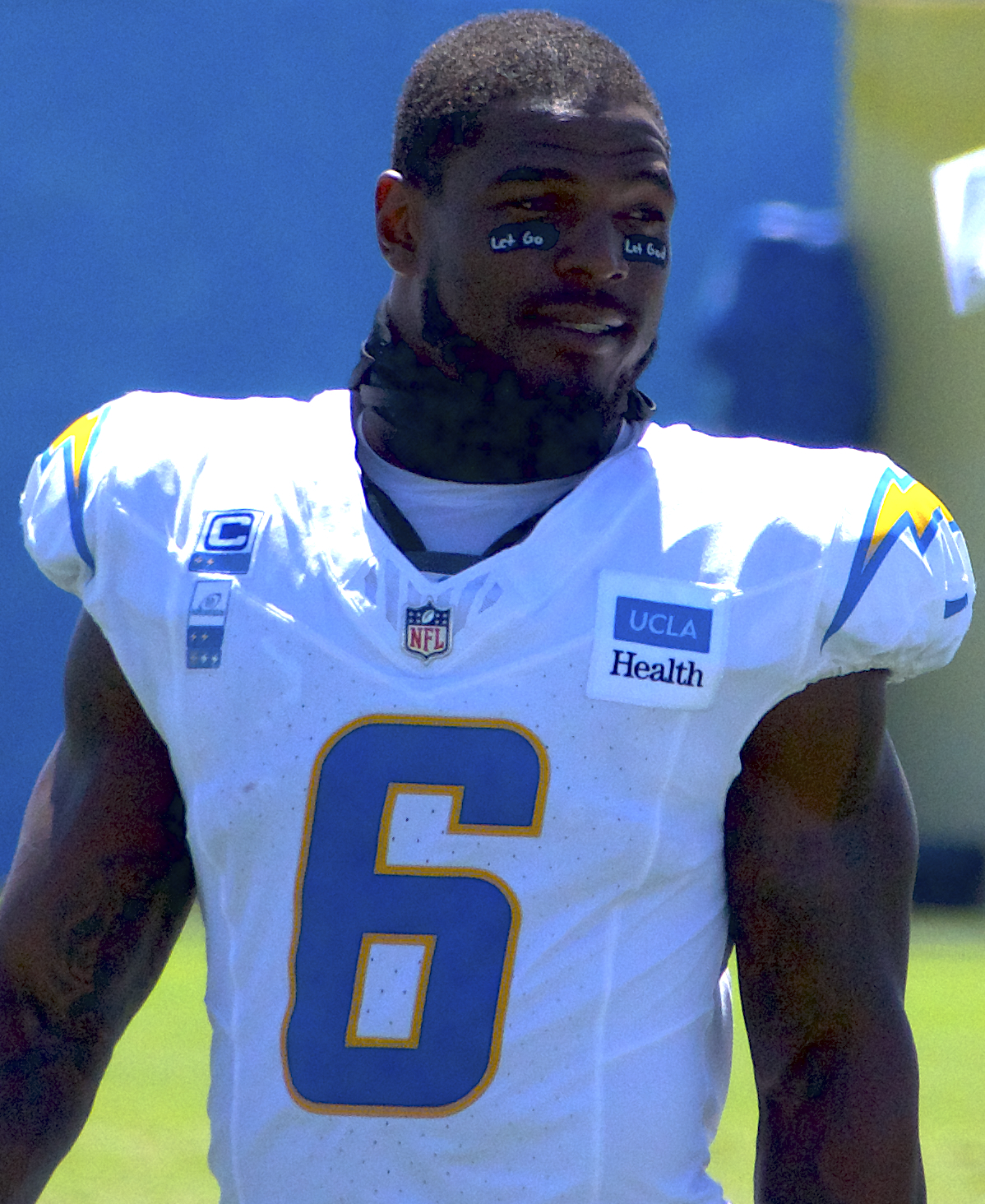
- Perryman with the Los Angeles Chargers in 2026

No. 6 – Los Angeles Chargers
- Position: Linebacker
- Roster status: Active

Personal information
- Born: December 5, 1992 (age 33); Coral Gables, Florida, U.S.
- Listed height: 5 ft 11 in (1.80 m)
- Listed weight: 240 lb (109 kg)

Career information
- High school: Coral Gables Senior
- College: Miami (FL) (2011–2014)
- NFL draft: 2015: 2nd round, 48th overall pick

Career history
- San Diego / Los Angeles Chargers (2015–2020); Carolina Panthers (2021)*; Las Vegas Raiders (2021–2022); Houston Texans (2023); Los Angeles Chargers (2024–present)
- * Offseason or practice squad member only

Awards and highlights
- Pro Bowl (2021); Third-team All-American (2014); 2× First-team All-ACC (2013, 2014)

Career NFL statistics as of 2025
- Total tackles: 764
- Sacks: 7.5
- Forced fumbles: 4
- Fumble recoveries: 3
- Pass deflections: 17
- Interceptions: 5
- Stats at Pro Football Reference

Denzel Lamar Perryman (born December 5, 1992) is an American professional football linebacker for the Los Angeles Chargers of the National Football League (NFL). He played college football for the Miami Hurricanes and was selected by the then San Diego Chargers in the second round of the 2015 NFL draft.

== Early life ==
Perryman attended Coral Gables Senior High School. He recorded 177 tackles, 12 for losses, 9 sacks, and 5 interception returns for touchdowns and 9 interceptions as a senior. He was also an area Defensive Player of the Year as a junior, registering 166 solo tackles and had 105 tackles, 9 sacks and 6 interceptions as a sophomore.

== College career ==
Perryman played as a true freshman and saw action in all 12 games, earning eight starts. He finished first among Atlantic Coast Conference (ACC) freshmen and second overall on team with 127 tackles (97 solo, 22 assists). He was tied for second-highest tackle-for-loss total on team with 6.5. As a sophomore he played in nine games, all starts, mostly at middle linebacker. He had 64 total tackles (45 solo) and 6.0 tackles-for-loss. Also made Third-team All-ACC.

As a junior in 2013, Perryman was a first-team All-ACC selection. He was again an All-ACC selection as a senior in 2014. He was a semi-finalist for top linebacker of the year in 2014

== Professional career ==
=== Pre-draft ===
On November 4, 2014, it was announced that Perryman had received an invitation to appear in the 2015 Senior Bowl. He was one of four Miami players to be invited, including Phillip Dorsett, Clive Walford, and Ladarius Gunter. He accepted his invitation and attended the Senior Bowl as part of Jacksonville Jaguars head coach Gus Bradley's South team, but was, unfortunately, unable to play in the actual game due to a minor injury he suffered earlier the week in practice. Although he didn't play, he was able to garner interest from the San Diego Chargers after having an impressive performance in practice. Perryman was one of 35 collegiate linebackers to attend the NFL Scouting Combine in Indianapolis, Indiana. He performed all of the combine drills and finished second among linebackers in the bench press and 18th in the 40-yard dash. He was unable to perform the short shuttle and three-cone drill after sustaining a hip injury. On April 1, 2015, Perryman attended Miami's pro day and opted to perform the 40-yard dash (4.70s), 20-yard dash (2.65s), 10-yard dash (1.61s), bench press (30 reps), and vertical jump (33") before a hamstring injury during his second attempt in the 40-yard dash kept him from completing the short shuttle, and three-cone drill again. Although he was hampered by multiple injuries during the draft process, Perryman was still able to attain a second to third-round projection from NFL draft experts and scouts. He was ranked the fourth best inside linebacker in the draft by NFLDraftScout.com.

Pre-draft measurables
| Height | Weight | Arm length | Hand span | Wingspan | 40-yard dash | 10-yard split | 20-yard split | Vertical jump | Broad jump | Bench press |
|---|---|---|---|---|---|---|---|---|---|---|
| 5 ft 10 3/4 in (1.80 m) | 236 lb (107 kg) | 31 7/8 in (0.81 m) | 9 1/2 in (0.24 m) | 6 ft 2 5/8 in (1.90 m) | 4.78 s | 1.67 s | 2.77 s | 33.0 in (0.84 m) | 9 ft 5 in (2.87 m) | 30 reps |
All values from NFL Combine/Pro Day

=== San Diego / Los Angeles Chargers (first stint) ===
==== 2015 NFL draft ====
The San Diego Chargers selected Perryman in the second round (48th overall) of the 2015 NFL draft. He was the seventh linebacker selected in 2015 and was drafted by the Chargers' to provide depth after they experienced multiple injuries to their linebacker corps, including injuries to Dwight Freeney, Manti Te'o, and Melvin Ingram.

==== 2015 ====
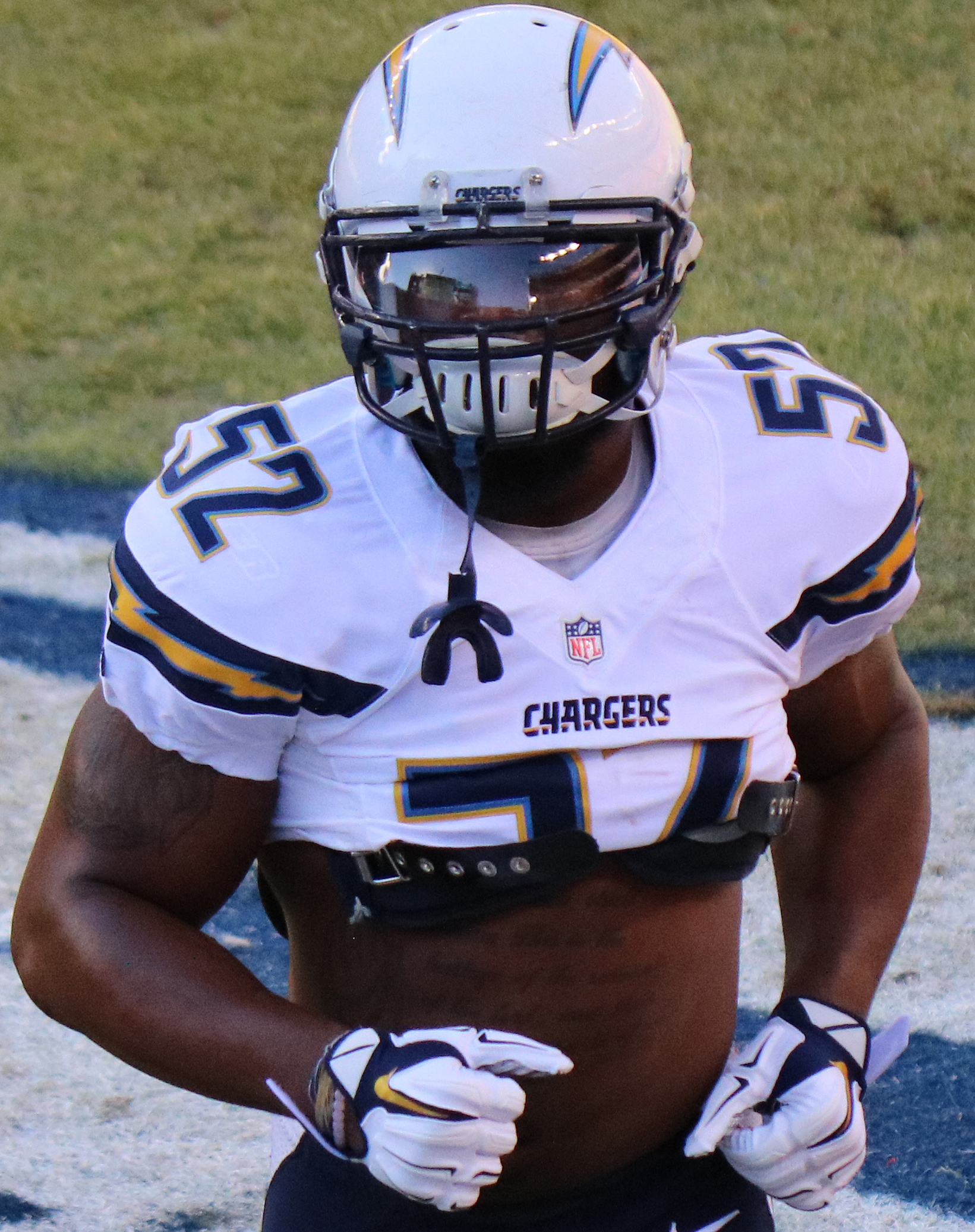
Perryman with the San Diego Chargers in January 2016

On May 14, 2015, the San Diego Chargers signed Perryman to a four-year, $4.77 million contract that includes $2.38 million guaranteed and a signing bonus of $1.73 million.

Perryman was limited at beginning of organized team activities due to a hamstring injury. He was heavily criticized for playing in a charity dodgeball game while injured and not medically cleared. Throughout training camp, he competed for a job as the starting inside linebacker against Manti Te'o and Donald Butler. Head coach Mike McCoy named Perryman the backup inside linebacker behind veterans Butler and Manti Te'o to start the regular season.

He made his professional regular season debut in the Chargers' season-opener against the Detroit Lions and made one solo tackle during their 33–28 victory. On October 18, 2015, Perryman earned his first career start in place of Manti Te'o, who suffered an ankle injury the previous week. He recorded eight combined tackles during the 27–20 loss at the Green Bay Packers. He started two consecutive games before sustaining a pectoral injury and was replaced by Kavell Conner in Weeks 8–9. In Week 11, Perryman and Te'o both returned from injury and defensive coordinator John Pagano named them the starting inside linebackers and demoted starters Butler and Kavell Conner. Pagano cited he wanted to give Te'o and Perryman experience as the Chargers were 2–8 going into Week 11. On November 22, 2015, Perryman made his official return from injury and recorded six combined tackles and made his first career sack on Alex Smith as the Chargers were routed 33–3 by the Kansas City Chiefs. In Week 13, he made a season-high ten solo tackles in a 17–3 loss to the Denver Broncos. On December 24, 2015, he collected a season-high 11 combined tackles and sacked Oakland Raiders quarterback Derek Carr during a 23–20 loss. Perryman finished his rookie season in 2015 season with a total of 73 combined tackles (64 solo) and two sacks in 14 games and nine starts.

==== 2016 ====
Perryman entered training camp slated as the starting inside linebacker, along with Manti Te'o, after the Chargers released Butler and Kavell Conner during the offseason. His position was challenged by Nick Dzubnar after Perryman suffered an undisclosed injury in camp and was sidelined for a few weeks. McCoy named Te'o and Perryman the starting inside linebackers, along with Kyle Emanuel and Melvin Ingram.

On September 25, Perryman recorded a season-high ten combined tackles and a sack on Andrew Luck during a 26–22 loss at the Indianapolis Colts. Perryman suffered a shoulder injury and was sidelined for the Chargers' Week 5 loss at the Raiders. He returned the following week to help a depleted defense, but was still dealing with an injured shoulder. On October 23, 2016, Perryman collected seven combined tackles, a pass break-up, and made his first career interception off of Matt Ryan during a 33-30 overtime victory at the Atlanta Falcons. Perryman helped the Chargers come back from a 17-point deficit as the defense held the Falcons to three points in the second half. His interception came with three minutes remaining in the fourth quarter and set up the San Diego's game-tying drive. He also made a crucial stop on fourth down in overtime, tackling running back Devonta Freeman for a one-yard loss to set up Josh Lambo's game-winning 42-yard field goal. He injured his hamstring and missed two consecutive games (Weeks 9–10). Perryman returned in Week 12 and tied his season-high of ten combined tackles during a 21–13 victory at the Houston Texans. On December 24, 2016, Perryman recorded seven combined tackles and a sack in the Chargers' 20–17 loss at the Cleveland Browns. He left in the fourth quarter after suffering a knee injury and was inactive for their Week 17 loss to the Chiefs. He finished the 2016 season with 72 combined tackles (56 solo), two sacks, and an interception in 12 games and 11 starts. The San Diego Chargers finished last in the AFC West with a 5–11 record in 2016 and did not qualify for the playoffs.

==== 2017 ====
On January 2, 2017, the San Diego Chargers fired McCoy. On January 12, San Diego Chargers' owner Alex Spanos announced that the team planned to immediately return to Los Angeles for the 2017 season and return as the Los Angeles Chargers.

Perryman entered training camp slated as the starting middle linebacker by head coach Anthony Lynn after defensive coordinator Gus Bradley switched the Chargers' defense to a base 4-3 defense that only requires one middle linebacker instead of two inside linebackers. On August 13, 2017, Perryman suffered a serious ankle injury that will require surgery during the Chargers' preseason opener against the Seattle Seahawks and was expected to miss 6–8 weeks. On September 4, 2017, the Los Angeles Chargers officially placed Perryman on injured reserve.

On November 7, 2017, he was activated off injured reserve to the active roster. On November 12, Perryman started his first game of the season at outside linebacker. Defensive coordinator Gus Bradley opted to have Hayes Pullard remain as the starting middle linebacker after a promising performance during Perryman's absence. Perryman went on to record a season-high ten combined tackles in his return, as the Chargers were defeated by the Jacksonville Jaguars, 20–17. On December 16, he was carted off the field after suffering a hamstring injury in the first half of the Chargers' 30–13 loss at the Kansas City Chiefs. He was inactive for Week 16 before returning to play in the Chargers' Week 17 win over the Oakland Raiders. He finished his third season with 37 combined tackles (25 solo) in seven games and six starts.

==== 2018 ====
Perryman entered the 2018 season as the starting middle linebacker. He started the first nine games before suffering a knee injury in Week 10. It was revealed that he sustained an injury to his LCL and would need surgery on his hamstring. He was placed on injured reserve on November 13, 2018.

==== 2019 ====
On March 8, 2019, Perryman signed a two-year, $12 million contract extension with the Chargers. In week 13 against the Broncos, Perryman recorded his first interception of the season off rookie quarterback Drew Lock in the 23–20 loss.

==== 2020 ====
In Week 11 against the New York Jets, Perryman recorded his first sack of the season on Joe Flacco during the 34–28 win.

=== Carolina Panthers ===
On March 18, 2021, Perryman signed a two-year contract with the Carolina Panthers.

=== Las Vegas Raiders ===
On August 25, 2021, Perryman was traded to the Las Vegas Raiders, along with a 2022 seventh-round pick, for a 2022 sixth-round pick. Perryman had a career year with the Raiders and recorded a franchise high of 154 tackles, which was also a career-high for Perryman. He was voted to his first Pro Bowl selection.

=== Houston Texans ===
On March 22, 2023, Perryman signed with the Houston Texans on a one-year, $3.5 million contract. He was suspended two games on November 15, 2023, for repeated violations of initiating contact with the helmet.

=== Los Angeles Chargers (second stint) ===
On March 19, 2024, Perryman returned to the Los Angeles Chargers, signing a one-year, $3 million contract. In 11 starts for the Chargers, Perryman logged 55 combined tackles and one sack.

On March 12, 2025, Perryman re-signed with Los Angeles on a one-year, $3.65 million contract. He suffered a high ankle sprain in Week 1 against the Kansas City Chiefs, and was placed on injured reserve on September 15. Perryman was activated on October 18, ahead of the team's Week 7 matchup against the Indianapolis Colts. On December 23, the league upheld a two-game suspension for Perryman for repeated violations of playing rules intended to protect the health and safety of players.

On March 17, 2026, Perryman re-signed with the Chargers on a one-year, $2.79 million contract. He was placed on injured reserve due to an undisclosed injury on August 31. He was activated on November 16.

== Career statistics ==
=== NFL ===
Legend
| **Bold** | Career high |

==== Regular season ====
| Year | Team | Games | | Tackles | | | | | Interceptions | | | | | Fumbles | | | |
| Year | Team | GP | GS | Cmb | Solo | Ast | Sck | TFL | Int | Yds | TD | Lng | PD | FF | FR | Yds | TD |
|---|---|---|---|---|---|---|---|---|---|---|---|---|---|---|---|---|---|
| 2015 | SDG | 14 | 9 | 73 | 64 | 9 | **2.0** | 8 | 0 | 0 | 0 | 0 | 0 | **1** | 0 | 0 | 0 |
| 2016 | SDG | 12 | 11 | 72 | 56 | 16 | **2.0** | 8 | 1 | 1 | 0 | 1 | 2 | 0 | 0 | 0 | 0 |
| 2017 | LAC | 7 | 6 | 37 | 25 | 12 | 0.0 | 1 | 0 | 0 | 0 | 0 | 0 | 0 | 1 | 0 | 0 |
| 2018 | LAC | 9 | 9 | 51 | 30 | 21 | 0.0 | 1 | 1 | 16 | 0 | 16 | 2 | 0 | 0 | 0 | 0 |
| 2019 | LAC | 14 | 10 | 68 | 50 | 18 | 0.0 | 5 | 1 | 0 | 0 | 0 | 1 | **1** | 0 | 0 | 0 |
| 2020 | LAC | 13 | 6 | 48 | 25 | 23 | 1.0 | 3 | 0 | 0 | 0 | 0 | 1 | **1** | 0 | 0 | 0 |
| 2021 | LVR | **15** | **15** | **154** | **102** | **52** | 0.0 | 5 | 0 | 0 | 0 | 0 | **3** | **1** | **2** | **1** | 0 |
| 2022 | LVR | 12 | 11 | 83 | 54 | 29 | 1.0 | **14** | **2** | **48** | 0 | **24** | 2 | 0 | 0 | 0 | 0 |
| 2023 | HOU | 12 | 11 | 76 | 45 | 31 | 0.5 | 6 | 0 | 0 | 0 | 0 | **3** | 0 | 0 | 0 | 0 |
| 2024 | LAC | 11 | 11 | 55 | 39 | 16 | 1.0 | 2 | 0 | 0 | 0 | 0 | 0 | 0 | 0 | 0 | 0 |
| 2025 | LAC | 10 | 10 | 47 | 30 | 17 | 0.0 | 4 | 0 | 0 | 0 | 0 | 3 | 0 | 0 | 0 | 0 |
| Career | | 129 | 109 | 764 | 520 | 244 | 7.5 | 57 | 5 | 65 | 0 | 24 | 17 | 4 | 3 | 1 | 0 |

==== Playoffs ====
| Year | Team | Games | | Tackles | | | | | Interceptions | | | | | Fumbles | | | |
| Year | Team | GP | GS | Cmb | Solo | Ast | Sck | TFL | Int | Yds | TD | Lng | PD | FF | FR | Yds | TD |
|---|---|---|---|---|---|---|---|---|---|---|---|---|---|---|---|---|---|
| 2021 | LVR | 1 | 1 | **9** | **6** | **3** | 0.0 | 0 | 0 | 0 | 0 | 0 | 0 | 0 | 0 | 0 | 0 |
| 2023 | HOU | **2** | **2** | 8 | 5 | **3** | 0.0 | **1** | 0 | 0 | 0 | 0 | 0 | 0 | 0 | 0 | 0 |
| 2024 | LAC | 1 | 1 | 2 | 0 | 2 | 0.0 | 0 | 0 | 0 | 0 | 0 | 0 | 0 | 0 | 0 | 0 |
| 2025 | LAC | 1 | 1 | 4 | 2 | 2 | 0.0 | 0 | 0 | 0 | 0 | 0 | 0 | 0 | 0 | 0 | 0 |
| Career | | 5 | 5 | 23 | 13 | 10 | 0.0 | 1 | 0 | 0 | 0 | 0 | 0 | 0 | 0 | 0 | 0 |

=== College statistics ===
| Season | Team | GP | Defense | | | | |
| Season | Team | GP | Cmb | TfL | Sck | Int | FF |
|---|---|---|---|---|---|---|---|
| 2011 | Miami | 12 | 69 | 6.5 | 1.0 | 0 | 2 |
| 2012 | Miami | 9 | 64 | 6.0 | 0.0 | 1 | 0 |
| 2013 | Miami | 13 | 108 | 5.0 | 1.5 | 0 | 1 |
| 2014 | Miami | 13 | 110 | 9.5 | 2.0 | 0 | 3 |
| Totals | | 47 | 351 | 27.0 | 4.5 | 1 | 6 |

== Personal life ==
Perryman's cousin is former Florida wide receiver and cornerback Quinton Dunbar.

On August 1, 2025, Perryman was stopped by Los Angeles County Sheriff's Department for vehicle violations on his way to a gun range; he was arrested for possession of "non-compliant" AR-style rifles. Perryman was released from custody on August 4 after the Los Angeles district attorney decided not to file criminal charges.
