= Hayes Pullard =

American football player and coach (born 1992)

Hayes Pullard III
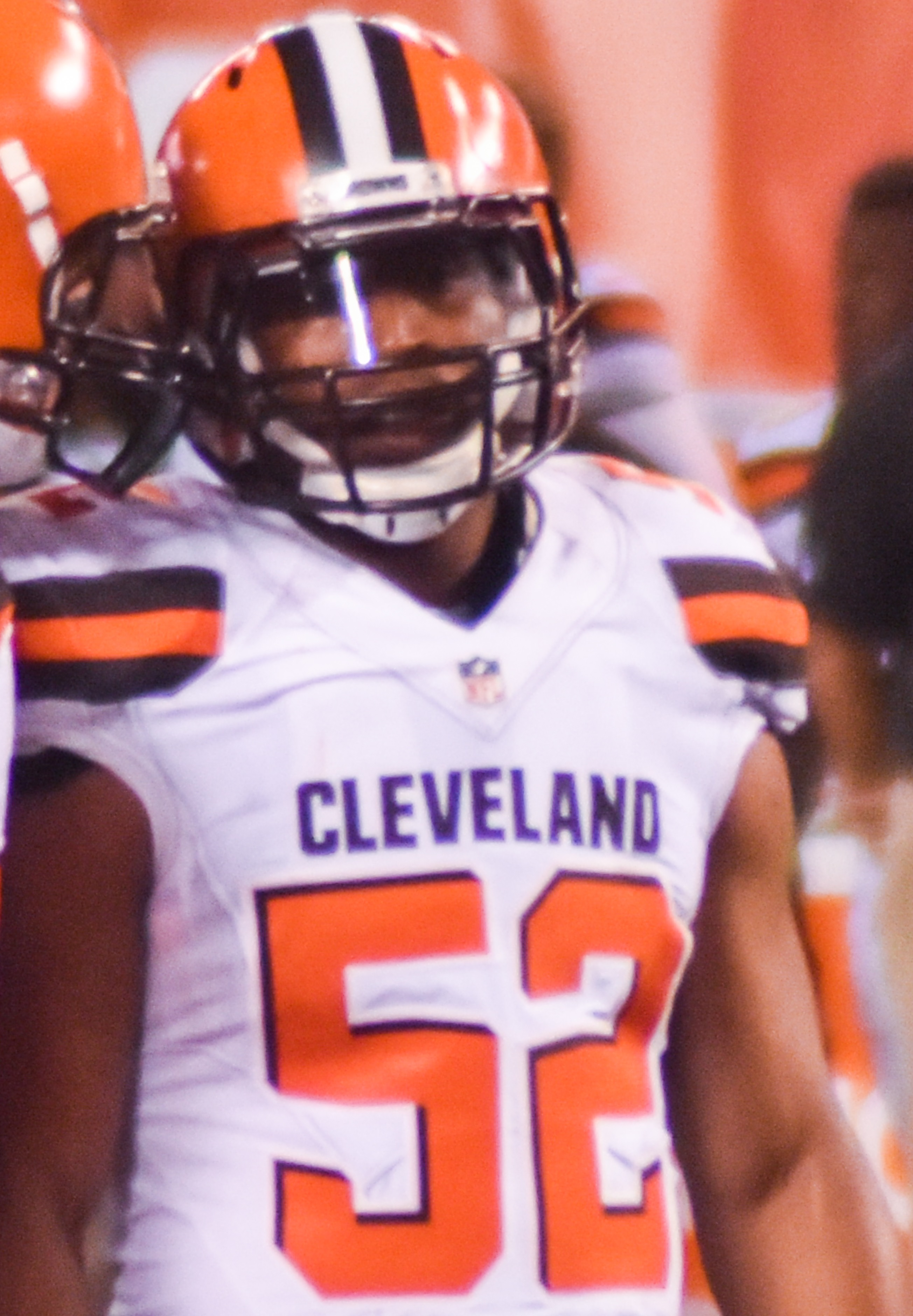
- Pullard with the Cleveland Browns in 2015

New York Jets
- Title: Defensive assistant

Personal information
- Born: April 18, 1992 (age 34); Inglewood, California, U.S.
- Listed height: 6 ft 0 in (1.83 m)
- Listed weight: 235 lb (107 kg)

Career information
- High school: Crenshaw (Los Angeles, California)
- College: USC (2010–2014)
- NFL draft: 2015: 7th round, 219th overall pick

Career history

Playing
- Cleveland Browns (2015)*; Jacksonville Jaguars (2015–2016); Los Angeles Chargers (2017–2018); Arizona Cardinals (2019)*; Philadelphia Eagles (2019)*
- * Offseason or practice squad member only

Coaching
- USC (2020) Quality control analyst; New York Jets (2021–present) Defensive assistant

Awards and highlights
- Second-team All-Pac-12 (2013)

Career NFL statistics
- Total tackles: 114
- Fumble recoveries: 1
- Interceptions: 1
- Stats at Pro Football Reference

Hayes Joseph "HP" Pullard III (born April 18, 1992) is an American football coach and former linebacker who is currently a defensive assistant for the New York Jets of the National Football League (NFL). He was previously a quality control analyst for the USC Trojans, where he played college football. He was selected by the Cleveland Browns in the seventh round of the 2015 NFL draft, and was also a member of the Jacksonville Jaguars, Los Angeles Chargers, Arizona Cardinals, and Philadelphia Eagles.

== Early life ==
Hayes Pullard was born in Inglewood, California, to Hayes Pullard, Jr. and his wife, Sharon Pullard. He was one of 10 children. His uncle was Robert Pullard, a stand-out pole vaulter at the University of Southern California (USC) from 1971 to 1974. His uncle placed third at the 1973 NCAA University Division Outdoor Track and Field Championships, and fourth in 1974. His mother was manager at a bank, and an ordained minister. Hayes' father collapsed on September 29, 2008, while playing basketball on his 60th birthday. He fell into a coma, and died on October 13, 2008.

Pullard attended Crenshaw High School in Los Angeles, California, where he also played football, basketball, and sprinted for the track and field team. His mother wanted Pullard to attend an academically superior school on the other side of the San Fernando Valley, away from the drugs, violence, and crime which surrounded Crenshaw . Pullard's brothers DeShawn and Ken had attended Crenshaw High. DeShawn Pullard even tried to convince Hayes to attend Susan Miller Dorsey High School, which had an excellent football program. But Pullard agreed with his father, and attended Crenshaw.

Pullard played linebacker and defensive back on defense, and running back on offense. From 2007 to 2009, Pullard played alongside De'Anthony Thomas and Marcus Martin, and the three helped Crenshaw High School become the first Los Angeles City Section team to play in a state championship game. In his last two years, he had 211 defensive tackles, gained 1,475 yards (1,349 m) on offense (including 20 touchdowns), and caught 21 receptions for 234 yards (214 m) on offense (four for touchdowns). By the end of his senior season, Pullard stood 6 feet 1 inch (1.85 m) tall and weighed 215 pounds (98 kg).

Pullard was not only a star player at Crenshaw, but also mentored other students. He often invited at-risk kids to come to his home so they would stay off the street, and helped them study for classes. He became particularly close to his high school football coach, Robert Garrett. He continued to speak with Garrett twice a week by telephone throughout his collegiate career.

== College career ==
Pullard grew up wanting to attend the University of California at Los Angeles (UCLA), where numerous other Crenshaw students had played football. But his father wanted Hayes to attend USC, where Robert Pullard shined as an athlete. UCLA offered Pullard an athletic scholarship, and Pullard made several visits to the campus to speak with former Crenshaw students playing for the Bruins. But USC head coach Pete Carroll and assistant defensive coach Ken Norton Jr., determined to recruit more players from the neighborhoods near their university, were also interested in Pullard. Norton convinced Pullard to attend some USC practices. Pullard was strongly impressed with Carroll and Norton's coaching, and the attitude and energy of the USC players. The day before National Signing Day, Carroll announced he was leaving USC to coach professionally for the Seattle Seahawks. Norton convinced Pullard to stick with USC.

He was redshirted his freshman year (the 2010 season) after suffering a knee sprain mid-season. He had surgery in the off-season to correct problems which arose from the sprain. That summer, the NCAA punished USC for numerous rules and recruiting violations, banning the team from playing in Pac-10 Conference championship games and bowl games for two seasons. Pullard had the right to transfer to another school, but declined to do so.

Pullard started all 12 games for the Trojans in the 2011 season. Pullard was a weak side linebacker, helping to lead the team in weak-side tackles. He led the team in tackles (81), and he and fellow freshman linebacker Dion Bailey became the first freshmen to lead USC in tackles since the team began keeping records.

In Pullard's junior year in 2012, USC began the season ranked Number 1 in the USA Today Coaches' Poll. USC's 2012 season was a dismal one, as the team finished 7–6. The team played in the Sun Bowl, losing 21–7 to the Georgia Tech Yellow Jackets. A violent altercation (which some media reported as a fistfight, while others said it was verbal) broke out in the USC locker room after the game, in which some younger players criticized senior quarterback Matt Barkley for not playing even though injured and for generally poor leadership throughout the season. Pullard had an outstanding year, however, and along with T. J. McDonald was one of only two players to have more than 100 tackles (107) in a season—the first time any USC player had as many tackles in a single season since 1996.

Pullard was elected team co-captain by his fellow players in the 2013 season. McDonald was the individual most responsible for telling Pullard to step up as a team leader, a role Pullard then embraced. USC lost three of its first five games of Pullard's senior season, and Kiffin was fired as head coach on September 29, 2013. Defensive line coach Ed Orgeron was named the interim head coach, and led the team to a 6–2 record. At season's end, Pullard had 94 tackles.

Many in the news media speculated that Pullard would forego his senior year of football and join the 2014 NFL draft. But Pullard had promised his mother he would graduate from college, and declined to do so.

Pullard was again elected team co-captain by his fellow players in the 2014 season. Steve Sarkisian was named USC's permanent head coach at the end of the 2013 season. Sarkisian said Pullard was a team leader in soothing feelings and helping make the transition a smooth one. In the second game of the season, Pullard was ejected for the last half of the game for hitting Stanford University wide receiver Ty Montgomery out of bounds after the play was over. The Trojans ended their season playing in the Holiday Bowl, winning 45–42 over the University of Nebraska Cornhuskers. Pullard had a team-high 87 tackles his final season, making him the first USC player since Dennis Johnson (1977 to 1979) to lead the team in tackles for three back-to-back seasons. He ended his career at USC with 369 tackles—seventh most in USC history and just 27 short of the 396 career tackles set by Marcus Cotton from 1984 to 1987.

In May 2015, Pullard graduated from the University of Southern California with a degree in policy, planning and development.

== Professional career ==
=== Pre-draft ===
Pullard was not expected to be drafted, due to the glut of linebackers in the draft. His prospects dramatically improved when, two days before the draft, he published an open letter to the 32 NFL teams on The Players' Tribune. Pullard discussed his ability to read offenses, his loyalty in the face of difficult times and program changes at USC, and the adversity he faced in life.

Pre-draft measurables
Height	Weight	Arm length	Hand span	40-yard dash	10-yard split	20-yard split	20-yard shuttle	Three-cone drill	Vertical jump	Broad jump	Bench press
6 ft 0 in (1.83 m)	240 lb (109 kg)	31 1/4 in (0.79 m)	9 5/8 in (0.24 m)	4.78 s	1.64 s	2.76 s	4.39 s	7.07 s	31 in (0.79 m)	9 ft 2 in (2.79 m)	19 reps
All values from NFL Combine

=== Cleveland Browns ===
The Cleveland Browns selected Pullard in the seventh round (219th overall) of the 2015 NFL draft. He was the 33rd linebacker selected in 2015. On May 17, 2015, the Browns signed Pullard four-year, $2.35 million contract that includes a signing bonus of $79,240. He was released by the Browns on September 5, 2015. He was signed to the Browns' practice squad the following day.

=== Jacksonville Jaguars ===
On October 28, 2015, the Jacksonville Jaguars signed Pullard off the Browns' practice squad. They signed him to a four-year, $2.28 million contract.

On September 3, 2017, Pullard was waived by the Jaguars.

=== Los Angeles Chargers ===
On September 4, 2017, Pullard was claimed off waivers by the Los Angeles Chargers and was reunited with Chargers' defensive coordinator Gus Bradley who was Pullard's head coach in Jacksonville. He was signed as depth at middle linebacker after starter Denzel Perryman was placed on injured reserve with an ankle injury. Upon joining the team, head coach Anthony Lynn named Pullard the backup middle linebacker behind Korey Toomer. He competed in an open competition between himself, Korey Toomer, and Kyle Emanuel for the job as the starting middle linebacker.

On September 2, 2018, Pullard was waived by the Chargers. He was re-signed on October 30, 2018.

=== Arizona Cardinals ===
On August 2, 2019, Pullard signed with the Arizona Cardinals. He was released on August 25, 2019.

=== Philadelphia Eagles ===
On August 27, 2019, Pullard signed with the Philadelphia Eagles. He was released during final roster cuts on August 30, 2019.

== Coaching career ==
In 2020, Pullard returned to USC as a quality control analyst.
