= Melvin Ingram =

American football player (born 1989)

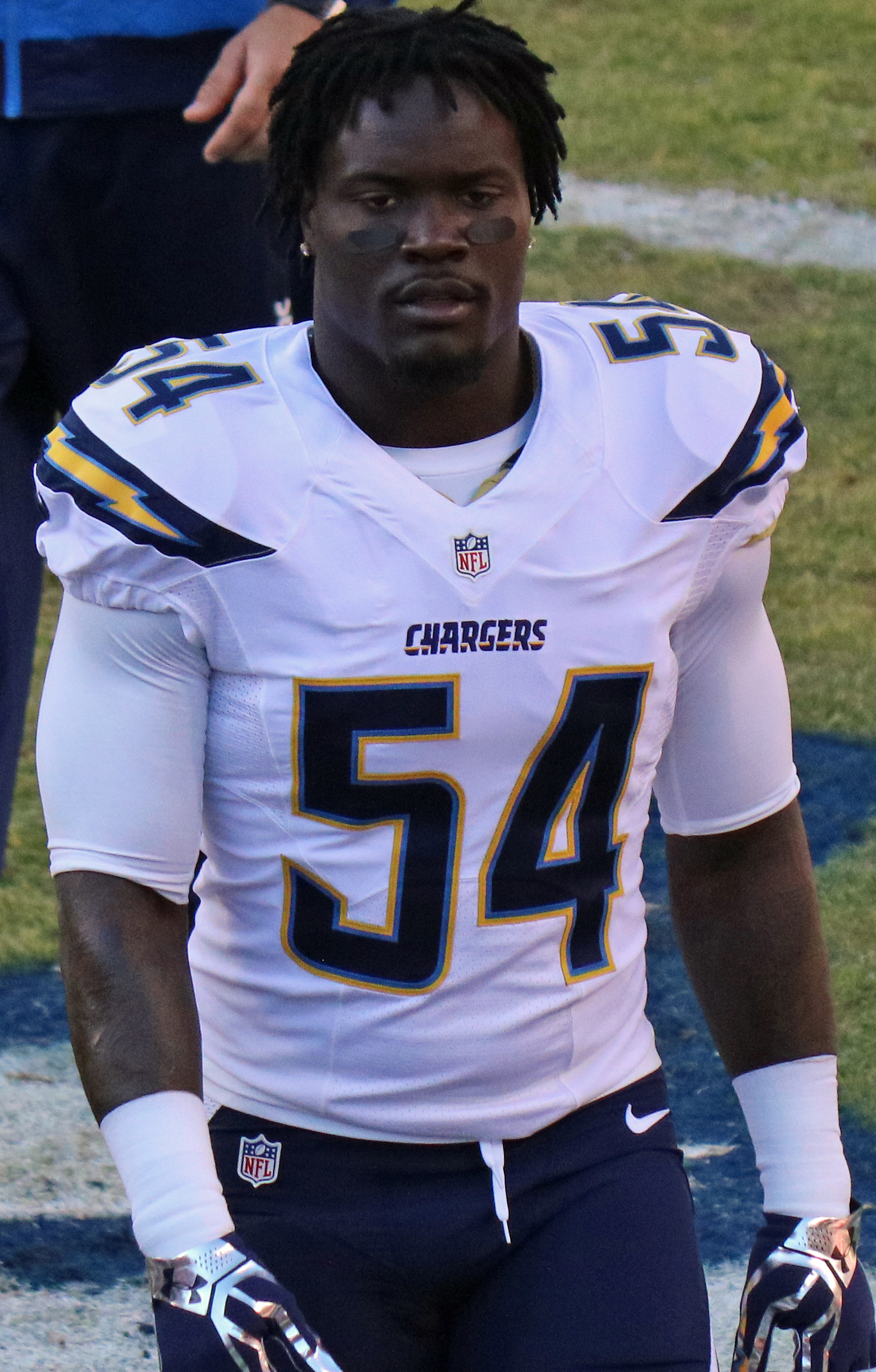
- Ingram with the San Diego Chargers in 2015

No. 54, 8, 24, 6, 9
- Position: Linebacker

Personal information
- Born: April 26, 1989 (age 37); Hamlet, North Carolina, U.S.
- Listed height: 6 ft 2 in (1.88 m)
- Listed weight: 250 lb (113 kg)

Career information
- High school: Richmond (Rockingham, North Carolina)
- College: South Carolina (2007–2011)
- NFL draft: 2012: 1st round, 18th overall pick

Career history
- San Diego / Los Angeles Chargers (2012–2020); Pittsburgh Steelers (2021); Kansas City Chiefs (2021); Miami Dolphins (2022–2023)

Awards and highlights
- 3× Pro Bowl (2017–2019); Consensus All-American (2011); First-team All-SEC (2011)

Career NFL statistics
- Total tackles: 414
- Sacks: 58.5
- Forced fumbles: 16
- Fumble recoveries: 9
- Interceptions: 3
- Pass deflections: 30
- Defensive touchdowns: 2
- Stats at Pro Football Reference

Melvin Ingram III (born April 26, 1989) is an American former professional football player who was a linebacker in the National Football League (NFL). He played college football for the South Carolina Gamecocks, earning All-American honors in 2011. He was selected by the San Diego Chargers in the first round with the 18th overall pick of the 2012 NFL draft. He has also played for the Pittsburgh Steelers, Kansas City Chiefs, and Miami Dolphins.

== Early life ==
Ingram was born and raised in Hamlet, North Carolina. He attended Richmond Senior High School in Rockingham, North Carolina. As a senior linebacker, he recorded 87 tackles and 2.5 sacks. Ingram was inducted into the inaugural class of the Raider Athletic Hall of Fame in 2023.

== College career ==
Ingram attended the University of South Carolina, where he played for coach Steve Spurrier's South Carolina Gamecocks football team from 2007 to 2011. He played linebacker for the Gamecocks before switching to defensive end. As a junior in 2010, he led the team with nine sacks.

In 2011, Ingram registered 10 sacks, 15 tackles for loss, and two interceptions. He also scored three touchdowns. Two of his touchdowns came against Georgia in a 45–42 victory in Athens, which included a 68-yard run during a fake punt and a 5-yard fumble return. Ingram's strong senior campaign helped propel the Gamecocks defense to a final #4 national poll ranking, and he was a first-team All-Southeastern Conference (SEC) selection, and was recognized as a consensus All-American.

== Professional career ==
Pre-draft measurables
Height	Weight	Arm length	Hand span	Wingspan	40-yard dash	10-yard split	20-yard split	20-yard shuttle	Three-cone drill	Vertical jump	Broad jump	Bench press	Wonderlic
6 ft 1 1/2 in (1.87 m)	264 lb (120 kg)	31 1/2 in (0.80 m)	9 5/8 in (0.24 m)	6 ft 5 1/2 in (1.97 m)	4.79 s	1.62 s	2.63 s	4.18 s	6.83 s	34.5 in (0.88 m)	9 ft 1 in (2.77 m)	28 reps	18
All values from NFL Combine

=== San Diego / Los Angeles Chargers ===
Ingram was selected by the San Diego Chargers with the 18th overall pick in the first round of the 2012 NFL draft. In his rookie campaign, Ingram racked up 18 quarterback pressures, tied for second-most on the squad, along with 12 special teams tackles, which tied for the team lead. He played in all 16 games, with two starts.

On May 14, 2013, Ingram tore his anterior cruciate ligament during the Chargers' organized team activities and was expected to miss the entire 2013 season. On August 26, 2013, he was placed on the Reserve/Physically Unable to Perform (PUP) list. On December 7, 2013, Ingram was activated off the PUP list prior to Week 14. In Week 16, Ingram sacked Oakland Raiders quarterback Matt McGloin while forcing a fumble. In the wild card game against the Cincinnati Bengals, Ingram picked off quarterback Andy Dalton for his first postseason interception. On October 4, 2015, Ingram strip-sacked Cleveland Browns quarterback Josh McCown and recovered the fumble.

On February 27, 2017, the Chargers placed the franchise tag on Ingram. On June 11, 2017, Ingram signed a four-year, $66 million contract with $42 million guaranteed with the Chargers. Ingram earned the AFC Defensive Player of the Month for September 2017 after recording 5.5 sacks, including a three-sack game against the Chiefs in Week 3. He finished the season with 56 combined tackles and 10.5 sacks. Ingram was selected to his first career Pro Bowl after the 2017 season, replacing teammate Joey Bosa. He was ranked 76th by his peers on the NFL Top 100 Players of 2018.

Prior to the start of the 2018 NFL season, Ingram predicted that the Chargers would win Super Bowl LIII and he said that "We're ready. We've got to bring a Super Bowl to the city." He also said that "I was taught you've got to speak stuff into existence. If you want to do something, you've got to say you're going to do it and then you've got to go do it." In the end, Ingram and the Chargers failed to make it to the Super Bowl when they lost to the eventual Super Bowl champion New England Patriots by a score of 41–28 in the divisional round of the playoffs. On June 17, 2019, Ingram predicted that the Chargers would win Super Bowl LIV and stated that "We're the team to beat in the NFL, not just the AFC West, it's the NFL. We feel like when we're going against our offense that we need to beat them because they're the best. They need to beat us because we're the best. That's how we're going to get better." In the end, the 2019 Chargers not only failed to go to the Super Bowl, but missed the playoffs entirely after posting a 5–11 record.

On September 26, 2020, Ingram was placed on injured reserve with a knee injury. He was activated on October 24, 2020. He was placed back on injured reserve on November 27, 2020, with a knee injury.

=== Pittsburgh Steelers ===
On July 20, 2021, Ingram signed a one-year contract with the Pittsburgh Steelers.

=== Kansas City Chiefs ===
Ingram was traded to the Kansas City Chiefs on November 2, 2021, in exchange for a sixth-round selection in the 2022 NFL draft.

=== Miami Dolphins ===
On May 18, 2022, the Miami Dolphins signed Ingram to a contract.

On December 14, 2023, the Dolphins signed Ingram to their practice squad. He was promoted to the active roster on January 10, 2024.

== NFL career statistics ==
Year	Team	Games		Tackles				Fumbles				Interceptions					
Year	Team	GP	GS	Cmb	Solo	Ast	Sck	FF	FR	Yds	TD	Int	Yds	Avg	Lng	TD	PD
2012	SD	16	2	41	27	14	1.0	1	0	0	0	0	0	0.0	0	0	5
2013	SD	4	1	8	4	4	1.0	1	0	0	0	0	0	0.0	0	0	0
2014	SD	9	9	29	21	8	4.0	2	0	0	0	0	0	0.0	0	0	1
2015	SD	16	16	65	52	13	10.5	3	1	0	0	0	0	0.0	0	0	6
2016	SD	16	16	60	46	14	8.0	5	0	0	0	0	0	0.0	0	0	5
2017	LAC	16	16	56	43	13	10.5	1	2	39	1	0	0	0.0	0	0	1
2018	LAC	16	16	43	28	15	7.0	1	2	4	0	1	8	8.0	8	0	3
2019	LAC	13	13	48	39	9	7.0	0	1	2	0	1	9	9.0	9	0	5
2020	LAC	7	7	10	5	5	0.0	0	0	0	0	1	0	0.0	0	0	2
2021	PIT	6	1	10	5	5	1.0	0	0	0	0	0	0	0.0	0	0	1
2021	KC	9	6	15	7	8	1.0	1	0	0	0	0	0	0.0	0	0	0
2022	MIA	17	3	22	15	7	6.0	1	2	3	1	0	0	0.0	0	0	1
2023	MIA	3	0	7	6	1	1.5	0	0	0	0	0	0	0.0	0	0	0
Career		148	106	414	298	116	58.5	16	9	48	2	3	17	8.5	9	0	30
