= Korey Toomer =

American football player (born 1988)

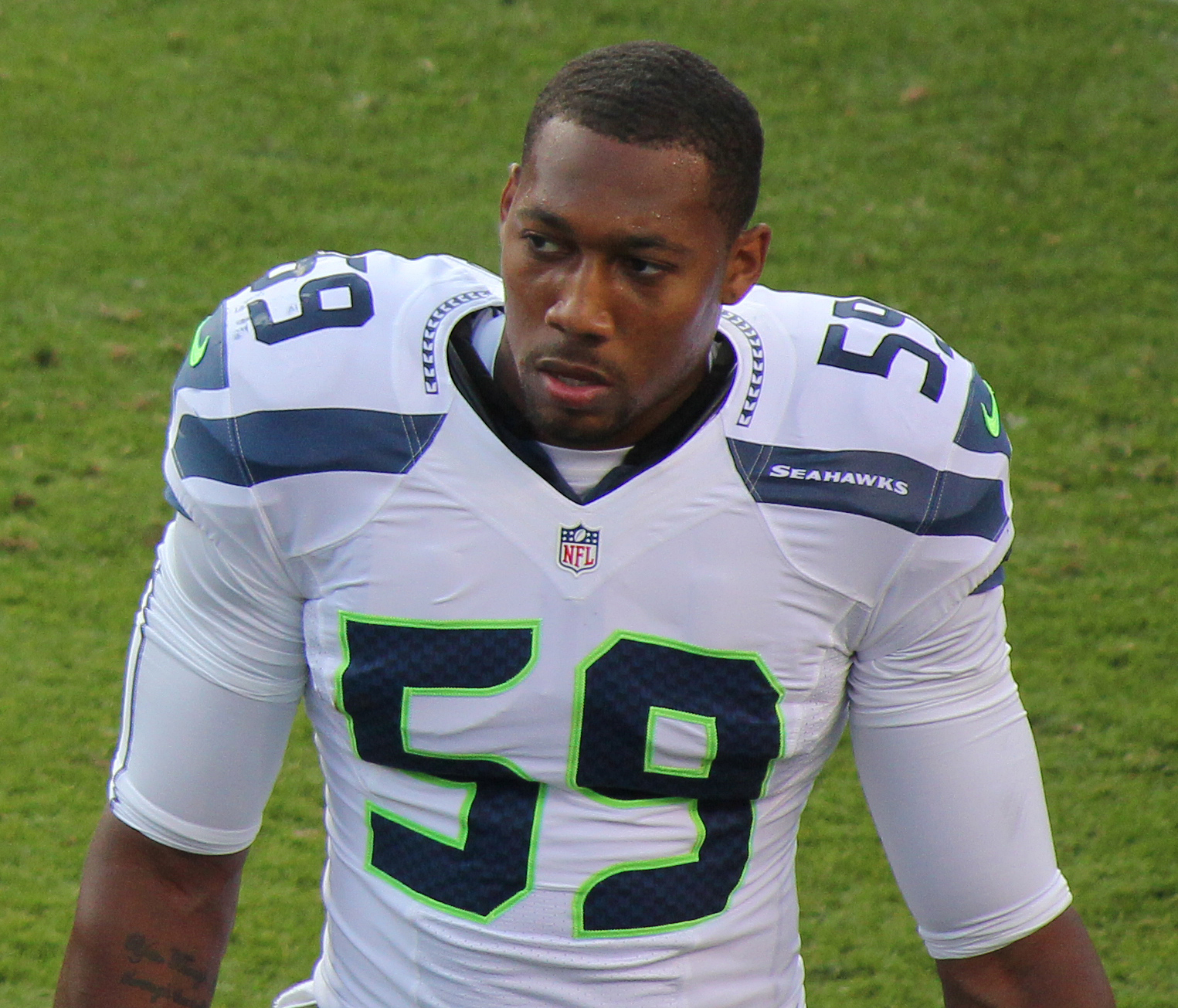
- Toomer with the Seattle Seahawks in 2012

No. 56, 59, 54
- Position: Linebacker

Personal information
- Born: December 9, 1988 (age 37); Las Vegas, Nevada, U.S.
- Listed height: 6 ft 2 in (1.88 m)
- Listed weight: 235 lb (107 kg)

Career information
- High school: Shadow Ridge (Las Vegas)
- College: Arizona Western (2007–2008); Idaho (2009–2011)
- NFL draft: 2012: 5th round, 154th overall pick

Career history
- Seattle Seahawks (2012–2013); Dallas Cowboys (2014); St. Louis Rams (2014); Oakland Raiders (2015–2016); San Diego / Los Angeles Chargers (2016–2017); San Francisco 49ers (2018)*; Green Bay Packers (2018); BC Lions (2019); Tampa Bay Vipers (2020)*; Seattle Dragons (2020)
- * Offseason or practice squad member only

Awards and highlights
- Super Bowl champion (XLVIII)

Career NFL statistics
- Total tackles: 133
- Sacks: 2
- Forced fumbles: 5
- Fumble recoveries: 1
- Interceptions: 1
- Defensive touchdowns: 1
- Stats at Pro Football Reference

Korey Toomer (born December 9, 1988) is an American former professional football player who was a linebacker in the National Football League (NFL). He was selected by the Seattle Seahawks in the fifth round of the 2012 NFL draft. He played college football for the Idaho Vandals.

== Early life ==
Born and raised in Las Vegas, Nevada, Toomer is the son of Pamelisa and Kyle Toomer. He is a 2007 graduate of Shadow Ridge High School.

== College career ==
A junior college transfer from Arizona Western in Yuma, Toomer played his final two years of college football at the University of Idaho in the WAC. He saw action on special teams and as a reserve linebacker as a junior in 2009 and redshirted in 2010, after seriously injuring his hand in fall camp. As a senior in 2011, Toomer started at linebacker and also saw late season action on offense as a fullback. After the season he was named the team's MVP.

== Professional career ==
=== Seattle Seahawks ===
Toomer was among the Seahawks' last cuts due to shoulder injury in 2012 and was signed to the practice squad. On August 27, 2013, he was placed on the reserve/non-football injury list. He was a part of the 2013 Seahawks team that won Super Bowl XLVIII. In 2014, he was released as part of final roster cuts.

=== Dallas Cowboys ===
Toomer was claimed off waivers by the Cowboys. He was released on October 17, 2014.

=== St. Louis Rams ===
Toomer was signed to the Rams' practice squad. On October 28, 2014, he was promoted to the active roster. He was released on August 31, 2015.

=== Oakland Raiders ===
Toomer was signed to the Raiders' practice squad on October 27, 2015, and was promoted to the active roster on October 31. On September 3, 2016, Toomer was released by the Raiders. The next day, he was signed to the Raiders' practice squad. He terminated his contract on September 27, 2016.

=== San Diego / Los Angeles Chargers ===
On September 28, 2016, Toomer was signed by the Chargers.

On March 9, 2017, the Chargers placed an original-round (fifth round) tender on Toomer. He officially signed his tender on April 4, 2017, keeping him under contract with the Chargers for 2017.

On September 11, 2017, in the season opener against the Denver Broncos on Monday Night Football, Toomer forced a fumble from running back Jamaal Charles. The fumble was recovered by teammate Casey Hayward and set up the Chargers to have an eventual touchdown scoring drive.

=== San Francisco 49ers ===
On April 4, 2018, Toomer signed a one-year contract with the San Francisco 49ers. He was released on September 1, 2018.

=== Green Bay Packers ===
On September 3, 2018, Toomer signed with the Green Bay Packers. He was released on November 28, 2018.

=== BC Lions ===
Toomer signed with the BC Lions of the Canadian Football League on June 25, 2019. He was released after the season on November 15, 2019.

=== Seattle Dragons ===
Toomer signed with the Tampa Bay Vipers of the XFL. He was placed on the reserve list before the start of the regular season, and was traded to the Seattle Dragons in exchange for S. J. Green on February 18, 2020. He had his contract terminated when the league suspended operations on April 10, 2020.

== NFL career statistics ==
Legend
**Bold**	Career high

Year	Team	Games		Tackles					Interceptions					Fumbles			
Year	Team	GP	GS	Cmb	Solo	Ast	Sck	TFL	Int	Yds	TD	Lng	PD	FF	FR	Yds	TD
2014	DAL	1	0	0	0	0	0.0	0	0	0	0	0	0	0	0	0	0
2014	STL	7	0	3	1	2	0.0	0	0	0	0	0	0	0	0	0	0
2015	OAK	10	0	4	4	0	0.0	0	0	0	0	0	0	0	0	0	0
2016	SD	13	**8**	**75**	**53**	**22**	**1.0**	**5**	0	0	0	0	2	**3**	**1**	**2**	0
2017	LAC	**15**	**8**	48	30	18	**1.0**	1	**1**	**59**	**1**	**59**	**3**	2	0	0	0
2018	GB	7	0	3	3	0	0.0	0	0	0	0	0	0	0	0	0	0
		53	16	133	91	42	2.0	6	1	59	1	59	5	5	1	2	0
