= Nick Dzubnar =

American football player (born 1991)

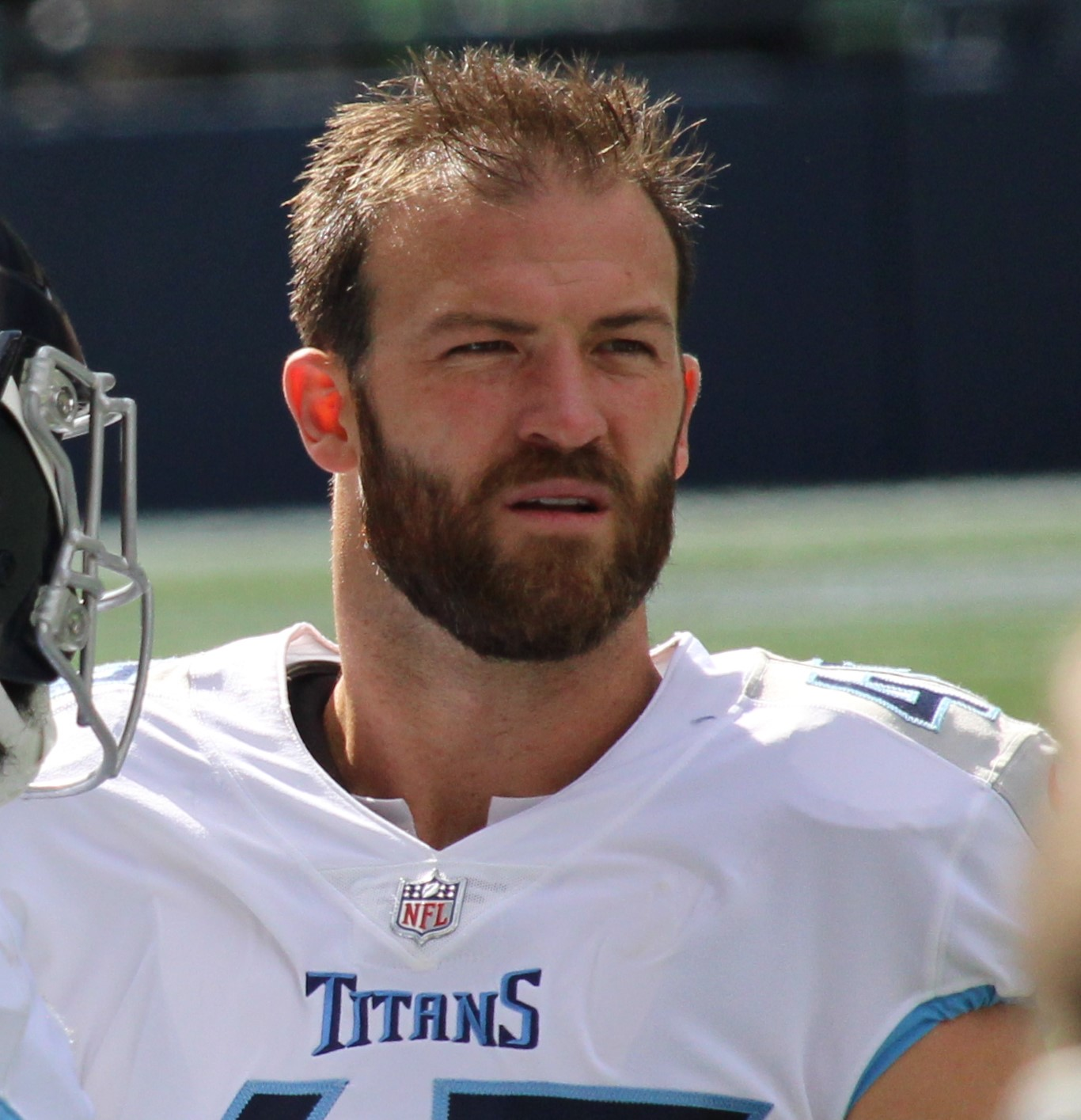
- Dzubnar with the Tennessee Titans in 2021

No. 48, 49
- Position: Linebacker

Personal information
- Born: August 15, 1991 (age 35); Anaheim, California, U.S.
- Listed height: 6 ft 1 in (1.85 m)
- Listed weight: 240 lb (109 kg)

Career information
- High school: Mission Viejo (Mission Viejo, California)
- College: Cal Poly (2010–2014)
- NFL draft: 2015: undrafted

Career history
- San Diego / Los Angeles Chargers (2015–2019); Tennessee Titans (2020–2021)

Career NFL statistics
- Total tackles: 89
- Stats at Pro Football Reference

Nicholas David Dzubnar (born August 15, 1991) is an American former professional football player who was a linebacker in the National Football League (NFL). He played college football for the Cal Poly Mustangs. He was signed as an undrafted free agent by the San Diego Chargers in 2015 and also played for the Tennessee Titans.

== Early life ==
Dzubnar was born in Anaheim, California, where he attended Mission Viejo High School. While at Mission Viejo, he played football, wrestling, and club hockey. In high school, he was a football team captain, senior class president, and led the Diablos to their first league title since 1972. Dzubnar was not a highly touted recruit, and was only pursued by UNLV, New Hampshire, and Cal Poly. On National Signing Day 2010, Dzubnar committed to Cal Poly, where his father also attended.

College recruiting
Name	Hometown	School	Height	Weight	40^{‡}	Commit date
Nick Dzubnar; LB	Rancho San Margarita, California	Mission Viejo	6 ft 1 in (1.85 m)	210 lb (95 kg)	4.7	Feb 3, 2010
Nick Dzubnar; LB	Recruit ratings: Scout: Rivals:					
Overall recruit ranking: Scout: NR (LB) Rivals: NR (QB), NR (California)
‡ Refers to 40-yard dash; Note: In many cases, Scout, Rivals, 247Sports, On3, and ESPN may conflict in their listings of height, weight and 40 time.; In these cases, the average was taken. ESPN grades are on a 100-point scale.; Sources: "2011 Team Ranking". Rivals.com.

== College career ==
Dzubnar attended California Polytechnic State University, San Luis Obispo from 2011 until 2014, where he played in 46 games. There, he started at strong and middle linebacker, totaling 414 total tackles throughout his college career. He also accumulated five interceptions, seven forced fumbles, two fumble recoveries, and five sacks. While at Cal Poly, he majored in construction management.

Dzubnar enrolled at Cal Poly in 2011, and redshirted his first year. As a redshirt freshman, he played in all 11 games, starting two. He totaled 24 total tackles, 14 solo stops, one forced fumble, and one interception. He tallied a season high ten total tackles and one forced fumble at South Alabama, and nine tackles against Eastern Washington. He also returned three kickoffs for a total of 34 yards.

Dzubnar led the Mustangs in tackles, totaling 107 throughout his sophomore season. He finished with 61 solo stops and 46 assisted tackles, including a season high of 15 against Weber State. He tallied over ten tackles in four separate contests: UC Davis, Sacramento State, Eastern Washington, and Sam Houston State Against UC Davis, he recorded his lone sack of the season and 2.5 tackles for loss. Dzubnar also forced one fumble and recovered two against Sacramento State, returning one fumble 58 yards for a touchdown. Against Northern Arizona, he forced one fumble and returned an interception for a touchdown. He also tallied five pass breakups throughout the season.

Beginning in the fall of 2013, Dzubnar was selected to the College Football Performance Awards watch list for linebackers, and also made the transition to strong side linebacker. For a second consecutive year, Dzubnar was the Mustangs leading tackler, ending the season with 112 tackles. His junior season performance earned him the No. 8 all-time rank single season tackles at Cal Poly, and No. 8 leading tackler in the Big Sky Conference. Dzubnar tallied 7 tackles for lost yardage, one sack, six pass deflections, one interception, three quarterback hurries, and three forced fumbles. He recorded a season high 14 tackles against Colorado State, 13 tackles at UC Davis, and 12 against Yale and Montana. He finished his junior season with six games with over ten tackles, and earned third-team All-Big Sky and College Sports Madness All-American honors.

At the beginning of his senior season, Dzubnar returned to middle linebacker. Before the season, he was named to the 2014 All-Big Sky Conference Preseason Team and the College Football Performance Awards watch list for linebackers for the second straight year. He finished with 167 total tackles, of which 73 were solo stops. In all but two games, Dzubnar recorded double-digit tackles. He tallied 9.5 tackles for losses, three sacks, and two interceptions returned for 53 yards. He had a record setting performance against Sacramento State, finishing with 19 total tackles, of which five were solo, 0.5 sacks, and one interception returned for 38 yards.

== Professional career ==
Dzubnar attracted attention from many NFL teams, but was not invited to the 2015 NFL Combine due to low exposure. Among those in attendance were Chargers, Cowboys, 49ers, Chiefs, and Raiders, whom he impressed with his lateral speed and strength.

Pre-draft measurables
Height	Weight	40-yard dash	10-yard split	20-yard split	20-yard shuttle	Three-cone drill	Vertical jump	Broad jump	Bench press
6 ft 1 in (1.85 m)	241 lb (109 kg)	4.67 s	1.74 s	2.93 s	4.16 s	6.67 s	34 in (0.86 m)	9 ft 3 in (2.82 m)	29 reps
All values from Cal Poly SLO Pro Day

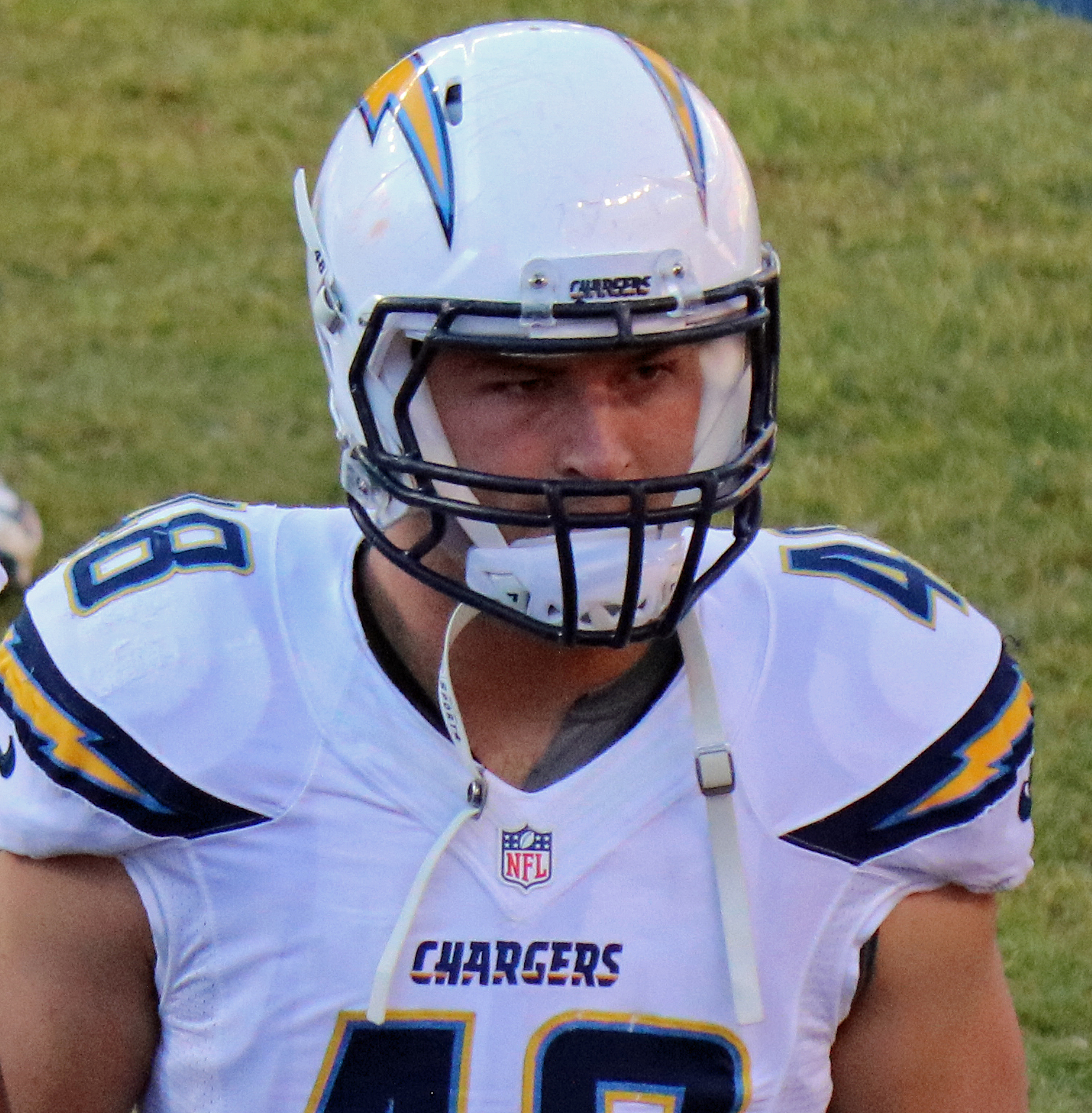
Dzubnar with the Chargers in 2015

=== San Diego/Los Angeles Chargers ===
As an undrafted free agent, Dzubnar participated in the San Diego Chargers rookie mini-camp. Later, on May 3, 2015, he was signed to the San Diego Chargers offseason roster. In preseason, Dzubnar posted a team high 25 tackles and two sacks. Dzubnar survived preseason cuts, and was promoted to the 53-man roster. He appeared in all 16 regular season games for the Chargers, serving a role primarily on special teams. At the end of the 2015 season, he totaled 15 tackles, of which 13 were solo tackles.

On October 10, 2016, Dzubnar was placed on injured reserve with a knee injury.

On September 4, 2017, Dzubnar was waived by the Chargers and was re-signed to practice squad. He was promoted to the active roster on September 23, 2017.

On March 12, 2018, Dzubnar signed a two-year $3.05 million contract extension with the Chargers.

=== Tennessee Titans ===
On March 26, 2020, Dzubnar signed a one-year contract with the Tennessee Titans. He re-signed with the team on August 16, 2021.

=== NFL statistics ===
==== Regular season ====
Year	Team	Games		Tackling				Fumbles				Interceptions					
Year	Team	GP	GS	Comb	Total	Ast	Sack	FF	FR	Yds	TD	Int	Yds	Avg	Lng	TD	PD
2015	SD	16	0	15	13	2	0.0	0	0	0	0	0	0	0.0	0	0	0
2016	SD	4	0	6	3	3	0.0	0	0	0	0	0	0	0.0	0	0	0
2017	LAC	13	0	21	14	7	0	0	0	0	0	0	0	0.0	0	0	0
2018	LAC	16	0	10	6	4	0.0	0	0	0	0	0	0	0.0	0	0	0
2019	LAC	16	0	8	3	5	0.0	0	0	0	0	0	0	0.0	0	0	0
2020	TEN	13	0	10	5	5	0.0	0	0	0	0	0	0	0.0	0	0	0
Career		78	0	70	44	26	0.0	0	0	0	0	0	0	0.0	0	0	0

==== Postseason ====
Year	Team	Games		Tackling				Fumbles				Interceptions					
Year	Team	GP	GS	Comb	Total	Ast	Sack	FF	FR	Yds	TD	Int	Yds	Avg	Lng	TD	PD
2018	LAC	2	0	3	2	1	0.0	0	0	0	0	0	0	0.0	0	0	0
Career		2	0	3	2	1	0.0	0	0	0	0	0	0	0.0	0	0	0

== Personal life ==
Nick is the son of Michael and Margaret Dzubnar. He has one brother, Colin, who was a defensive end at Cal Poly, and two sisters, Jessica a surgeon and Ryan Lekkerkerker whose husband formerly played for the Chargers. Nick is married to Michelle, his grade school sweetheart who is a Registered Nurse. They have a 2 daughters Dylan and Reese.
