= 2021 Los Angeles Chargers season =

62nd season in franchise history

- Owner: Dean Spanos
- General manager: Tom Telesco
- Head coach: Brandon Staley
- Home stadium: SoFi Stadium

Results
- Record: 9–8
- Division place: 3rd AFC West
- Playoffs: Did not qualify
- All-Pros: 3: LT Rashawn Slater (2nd team); C Corey Linsley (2nd team); KR Andre Roberts (2nd team)
- Pro Bowlers: 6: QB Justin Herbert; WR Keenan Allen; T Rashawn Slater; C Corey Linsley; DE Joey Bosa; SS Derwin James

Uniform
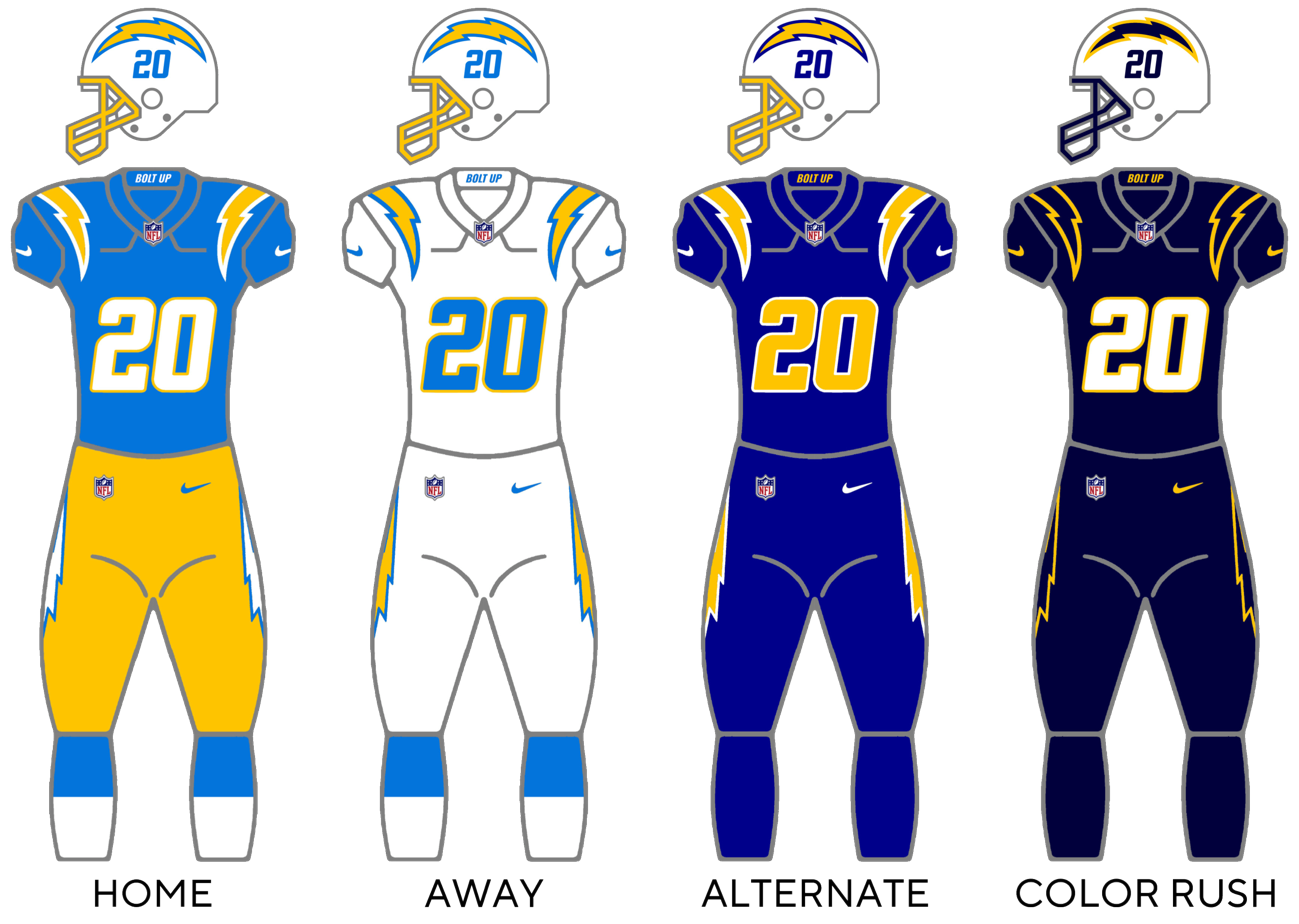

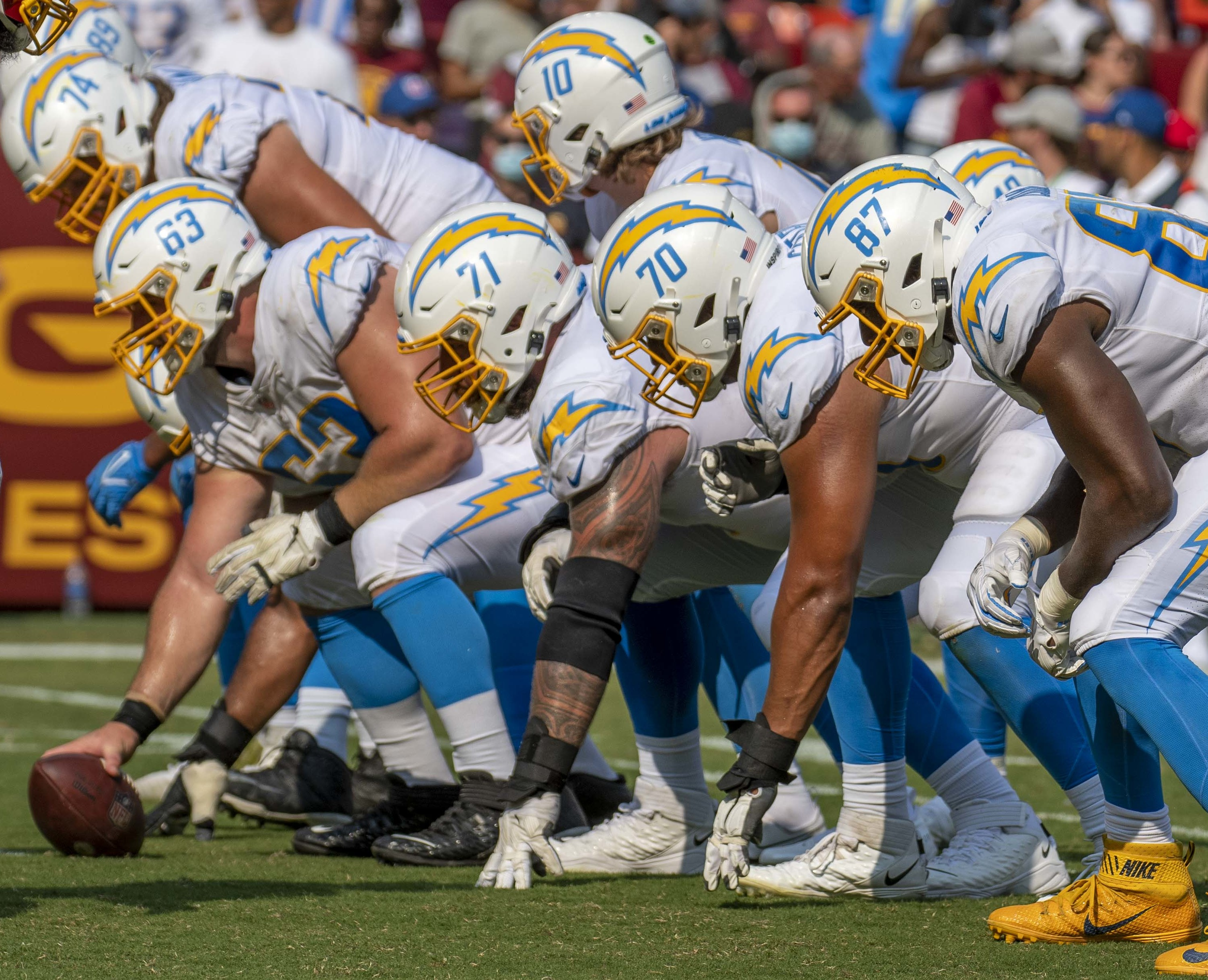
#10 Justin Herbert in Week 1 behind his rebuilt offensive line, featuring free-agent signings #63 Corey Linsley and #71 Matt Feiler, as well as 1st-round draft pick #70 Rashawn Slater. #87 Jared Cook (tight end) was another free-agent acquisition.

The 2021 season was the Los Angeles Chargers' 52nd season in the National Football League (NFL), their 62nd overall, their sixth in the Greater Los Angeles Area, their second playing their home games at SoFi Stadium and their first under head coach Brandon Staley. They improved upon their 7–9 season from the previous year after a win over the New York Giants, finishing 9–8 but narrowly missing the playoffs for the third consecutive season after a Week 18 loss to the Las Vegas Raiders. In that game, they were beaten by a field goal as time expired in overtime when a tie would have put both teams in the playoffs.

Los Angeles began the season 4–1, but were only 5–7 over the remaining twelve games. Highlights included road victories over the Bengals and Chiefs, who contested the AFC Championship Game at the end of the season. Staley implemented an aggressive offensive philosophy that saw the team often spurn punts or field goals in favor of going for it on 4th down, and the Chargers set a record for most 4th down conversions in a season with 22 from 34 attempts. Staley's philosophy was criticized after failed attempts in overtime defeats to the Chiefs and Raiders.

During the offseason, Los Angeles had prioritized an upgrade of their offensive line, with 1st-round draft pick Rashawn Slater joining free-agent signings Corey Linsley and Matt Feiler. Aided by their protection, quarterback Justin Herbert set numerous team records, and became the first Charger to throw for over 5,000 yards in a season. His top receivers, Keenan Allen and Mike Williams, each had over 1,100 receiving yards. While the running game was less effective, running back Austin Ekeler, through a mix of rushing and receiving, scored 20 touchdowns, a feat previously achieved only by LaDainian Tomlinson in franchise history. The defense was weaker than the offense, despite strong seasons from edge rusher Joey Bosa and safety Derwin James, who returned after missing the entire 2020 season through injury. They struggled particularly against the run and gave up several big plays on the ground during their season-ending defeat.

This was the last time that the Chargers would win a regular season game against their rival Chiefs until 2025.

== Coaching changes ==
Anthony Lynn was fired as head coach of the Chargers on January 4, the day after their 2020 season had concluded with a 7–9 record. Lynn had compiled a 33–31 record over four seasons, making the playoffs once. His reign was marked by several narrow defeats, including seven one-score losses in the 2020 season; they lost several games from strong positions that season, four times being beaten after holding double-digit leads. Lynn and his team were also criticized for errors with clock management.

It took the Chargers less than a fortnight to choose Lynn's successor, with Brandon Staley named the new head coach on January 17. It was Staley's first head coaching job; he had spent the previous season as defensive coordinator of the Los Angeles Rams, in charge of a defense that was the league's best in both points allowed and yards allowed. General manager Tom Telesco noted Staley's football mind and work ethic as reasons for the hire, while Staley described the job as a dream come true. Los Angeles also changed their offensive, defensive and special teams coordinators, with a trio of hires announced on January 25. New offensive coordinator Joe Lombardi had filled the same role for Detroit in 2014 and 2015, before serving as New Orleans Saints quarterback coach in the previous five seasons. Renaldo Hill joined from Denver as defensive coordinator after two seasons as defensive backs coach with the Broncos; he and Staley had worked together previously, having both been on the Broncos' staff during the 2019 season. New special teams coordinator Derius Swinton II had over a decade of NFL experience in that field with various clubs, most recently Arizona.

== Roster changes ==
=== Overview ===
Los Angeles overhauled their offensive line in the offseason after the unit was perceived to have performed poorly in 2020. Starters Dan Feeney, Forrest Lamp, Sam Tevi, and Trai Turner were either waived or allowed to leave in free agency, leaving only Bryan Bulaga to carry over into 2021. The Chargers filled three of their line vacancies through free agency. Center Corey Linsley signed a 5-year contract worth over $60 million. He had spent the previous seven seasons in Green Bay, starting 99 games and being named a 1st-team All-Pro in 2020 by the Associated Press. Former Steelers left guard Matt Feiler signed for three years on the same day, and Oday Aboushi, who had spent the past two seasons at Detroit, was brought in shortly afterward to play right guard.

Other offensive changes included the starting tight end spot: Hunter Henry left in free agency after five years with the Chargers, and was replaced by former Saint and 12-year veteran Jared Cook. Quarterback Tyrod Taylor went to Houston; he had begun the 2020 season as the Chargers' starter, but lost that role to Justin Herbert following a Week 2 injury.

On defense, Melvin Ingram left after nine seasons with the Chargers, during which he had started 96 games as a linebacker or defensive lineman and earned three Pro Bowl selections. Ingram had given indications of being unsatisfied with his contract going into 2020, and struggled with injuries during that season. Los Angeles released cornerback Casey Hayward after five years, two Pro Bowls and 75 starts. Another defensive back, safety Rayshawn Jenkins, was allowed to leave as an unrestricted free agent after starting all but one game the previous two seasons.

The Chargers twice made changes at the placekicker position. Incumbent Michael Badgley, who had struggled in 2020, was cut after he lost a training camp battle with Tristan Vizcaino. Vizcaino, however, missed five extra points and a field goal in the first six games of the regular season, and was himself replaced with eight-year veteran Dustin Hopkins on October 26. Andre Roberts was another mid-season signing, brought in to boost the Chargers' kick return game. Roberts had made the last three Pro Bowls as a returner with New York and Buffalo.

=== Free agency ===
==== Unrestricted ====
| Position | Player | 2021 team | Date signed | Contract |
|---|---|---|---|---|
| S | Jahleel Addae | Indianapolis Colts | October 26, 2021 | 1 year, $154,000 |
| CB | Michael Davis | Los Angeles Chargers | March 17, 2021 | 3 years, $25.2 million |
| G | Dan Feeney | New York Jets | March 18, 2021 | 1 year, $1.5 million |
| TE | Virgil Green | | | |
| C | Ryan Groy | | | |
| TE | Hunter Henry | New England Patriots | March 17, 2021 | 3 years, $37.5 million |
| DE | Melvin Ingram | Pittsburgh Steelers | July 20, 2021 | 1 year, $4 million |
| FS | Rayshawn Jenkins | Jacksonville Jaguars | March 17, 2021 | 4 years, $35 million |
| G | Forrest Lamp | Buffalo Bills | April 7, 2021 | 1 year |
| MLB | Denzel Perryman | Carolina Panthers | March 17, 2021 | 2 years, $6 million |
| DT | Damion Square | Cleveland Browns | May 4, 2021 | 1 year |
| QB | Tyrod Taylor | Houston Texans | March 17, 2021 | 1 year, $5.5 million |
| OT | Sam Tevi | Indianapolis Colts | March 22, 2021 | 1 year, $1.5 million |
| OLB | Nick Vigil | Minnesota Vikings | March 17, 2021 | 1 year, $1.35 million |
| SS | Jaylen Watkins | | | |

==== Restricted ====
| Position | Player | 2021 team | Date signed | Contract |
|---|---|---|---|---|
| TE | Stephen Anderson | Los Angeles Chargers | March 22, 2021 | 1 year, $920 thousand |
| K | Michael Badgley | Los Angeles Chargers | March 17, 2021^{[a]} | 1 year, $920 thousand |
| RB | Kalen Ballage | Pittsburgh Steelers | March 30, 2021 | 1 year, $920 thousand |
| MLB | B. J. Bello | Tennessee Titans | April 23, 2021 | 1 year, $850 thousand |
| CB | Brandon Facyson | Los Angeles Chargers | March 19, 2021 | 1 year, $920 thousand |
| DE | Isaac Rochell | Indianapolis Colts | March 19, 2021 | 1 year, $2.5 million |
| C | Cole Toner | Houston Texans | March 19, 2021 | 1 year, $920 thousand |

^{a} Badgley was cut on August 31, and spent the 2021 season with the Tennessee Titans and Indianapolis Colts.

==== Exclusive Rights FA ====
| Position | Player | 2021 team | Date signed | Contract |
|---|---|---|---|---|
| CB | Tevaughn Campbell | Los Angeles Chargers | March 17, 2021 | 1 year, $850 thousand |
| MLB | Cole Christiansen | Los Angeles Chargers | September 1, 2021 | 1 year, $610 thousand |
| DE | Joe Gaziano | Los Angeles Chargers | September 1, 2021 | 1 year, $780 thousand |
| P | Ty Long | Los Angeles Chargers | March 17, 2021 | 1 year, $850 thousand |
| TE | Matt Sokol | Jacksonville Jaguars | September 2, 2021 | 1 year, $165,600 |

=== Futures ===
Shortly after the end of their 2020 season, the Chargers signed ten players on their practice squad to reserve/future free-agent contracts.

| Position | Player | Date signed |
|---|---|---|
| G | Nate Gilliam | January 5, 2021 |
| RB | Darius Bradwell | January 5, 2021 |
| DT | T. J. Smith | January 5, 2021 |
| NT | Breiden Fehoko | January 5, 2021 |
| WR | Jason Moore | January 5, 2021 |
| CB | John Brannon | January 5, 2021 |
| WR | John Hurst | January 5, 2021 |
| G | Ryan Hunter | January 5, 2021 |
| CB | Donte Vaughn | January 5, 2021 |
| P | Lachlan Edwards | January 5, 2021 |

=== Signings ===
| Position | Player | Previous team | Date signed | Contract |
|---|---|---|---|---|
| K | Tristan Vizcaino | San Francisco 49ers | March 5, 2021 | 2 years, $1.485 million |
| C | Corey Linsley | Green Bay Packers | March 17, 2021 | 5 years, $62.5 million |
| G | Matt Feiler | Pittsburgh Steelers | March 17, 2021 | 3 years, $21 million |
| TE | Jared Cook | New Orleans Saints | March 18, 2021 | 1 year, $6 million |
| G | Oday Aboushi | Detroit Lions | March 20, 2021 | 1 year, $1.75 million |
| OLB | Kyler Fackrell | New York Giants | March 24, 2021 | 1 year, $1.5 million |
| QB | Chase Daniel | Detroit Lions | March 26, 2021 | 1 year, $1.075 million |
| CB | Ryan Smith | Tampa Bay Buccaneers | March 30, 2021 | 1 year, $1.75 million |
| CB | Kemon Hall | Dallas Cowboys (PS) | May 5, 2021 | 2 years, $1.485 million |
| DE | Christian Covington | Cincinnati Bengals | May 10, 2021 | 1 year, $990k |
| WR | Austin Proehl | Seattle Dragons (XFL) | May 18, 2021 | 1 year, $660k |
| LB | Damon Lloyd | Blues (TSL) | June 18, 2021 | 1 year, $660k |
| TE | Matt Seybert | Conquerors (TSL) | June 18, 2021 | 1 year, $660k |
| WR | Michael Bandy | Conquerors (TSL) | June 18, 2021 | 1 year, $660k |
| DE | Willie Yarbary | Conquerors (TSL) | June 18, 2021 | 1 year, $660k |
| QB | K. J. Costello | Mississippi State | August 1, 2021 | 3 years, $2.425 million |
| LS | Matt Overton | Tennessee Titans | August 16, 2021 | 1 year, $990k |
| S | Trey Marshall | Denver Broncos | September 1, 2021 | 1 year, $920k |
| CB | Kiondre Thomas | Cleveland Browns (PS) | September 6, 2021 | 1 year, $165,600 |
| WR | Maurice Ffrench | Kansas City Chiefs (PS) | September 15, 2021 | 1 year, $660k |
| G | Michael Schofield | Baltimore Ravens (PS) | September 17, 2021 | 1 year, $1.075 million |
| G | Senio Kelemete | San Francisco 49ers (PS) | October 12, 2021 | 1 year, $1.075 million |
| DE | Andrew Brown | Tennessee Titans (PS) | October 14, 2021 | 1 year, $895k |
| T | Foster Sarell | New York Giants (PS) | October 14, 2021 | 1 year, $705k |
| WR/KR | Andre Roberts | Houston Texans | October 21, 2021 | 1 year, $1.075 million |
| K | Dustin Hopkins | Washington Football Team | October 26, 2021 | 1 year, $1.075 million |
| DT | Caraun Reid | Tennessee Titans | November 17, 2021 | 1 year, $112k |
| CB | Davontae Harris | San Francisco 49ers | November 30, 2021 | 1 year, $920k |

=== Retirements ===
Center Mike Pouncey announced his retirement on February 12. Pouncey had spent the final three seasons of his ten-year career in Los Angeles; during the Chargers' playoff run in 2018, he had started every game and made the Pro Bowl. He picked up a neck injury five weeks into the following season, and a subsequent hip injury eventually proved to be career-ending.

| Position | Player | Date retired |
|---|---|---|
| C | Mike Pouncey | February 12, 2021 |

=== Releases/waivers ===
| Position | Player | 2021 team | Date released/waived |
|---|---|---|---|
| G | Trai Turner | Pittsburgh Steelers | March 12, 2021 |
| LB | Malik Jefferson | Indianapolis Colts | March 12, 2021 |
| CB | Casey Hayward | Las Vegas Raiders | March 13, 2021 |

== NFL draft ==
Los Angeles' 1st-round pick was the 13th overall in the draft. They were widely expected to complete their offensive line rebuild by taking an offensive tackle in the draft, with Rashawn Slater, Alijah Vera-Tucker, and Christian Darrisaw all projected as potential picks. In the event, the Chargers picked Slater. He was the second offensive lineman taken in the draft, after Penei Sewell (selected 6th overall by Detroit). General manager Tom Telesco said of Slater, "He's very smart, knows football, been very well coached." Slater would start 16 games during his rookie season, missing one game due to a positive COVID-19 test. At season's end, he was voted to both the AFC Pro Bowl team and the All-Pro 2nd Team, as well as the PFWA All-Rookie team.

The Chargers' next three picks also started multiple games as rookies. They selected Asante Samuel Jr. in the second round to replace Hayward at cornerback, despite concerns about his height (5-11). In 2021, he missed time due to a pair of concussions, but was otherwise the starter for each of his 12 games, in which he made two interceptions. 3rd-round wide receiver Josh Palmer was behind the established starters Keenan Allen and Mike Williams on the depth chart, but had the opportunity to start five games while they were injured, catching 33 passes for 353 yards and four touchdowns. Tight end Tre' McKitty started in four games and appeared in 11. He was drafted primarily as a blocker, and only caught six passes during the season.

Linebacker Nick Niemann, chosen in the sixth round, played minimally on defense but performed well enough on special teams to be voted to the PFWA All-Rookie team in that capacity.

2021 Los Angeles Chargers draft
| Round | Selection | Player | Position | College | Notes |
|---|---|---|---|---|---|
| 1 | 13 | Rashawn Slater | OT | Northwestern | |
| 2 | 47 | Asante Samuel Jr. | CB | Florida State | |
| 3 | 77 | Josh Palmer | WR | Tennessee | |
| 3 | 97* | Tre' McKitty | TE | Georgia | Compensatory selection (Note: Los Angeles received their 97th pick as a compensatory selection for the loss of Philip Rivers to the free agency market.) |
| 4 | 118 | Chris Rumph II | OLB | Duke | |
| 5 | 159 | Brenden Jaimes | OT | Nebraska | |
| 6 | 185 | Nick Niemann | LB | Iowa | from Jacksonville via Tennessee (Note: Los Angeles acquired a 2021 sixth-round selection (No. 185 overall) as part of a trade that sent cornerback Desmond King to the Tennessee Titans.) |
| 6 | 198 | Larry Rountree III | RB | Missouri | |
| 7 | 241 | Mark Webb | S | Georgia | |

=== Undrafted free agents ===
The Chargers signed ten undrafted free agents following the draft, including Amen Ogbongbemiga, who appeared in 15 games during the regular season and started two, finishing the year with 26 tackles and a sack.

2021 Los Angeles Chargers Undrafted Free Agents
| Player | Position | College | Notes |
|---|---|---|---|
| Ben DeLuca | S | Charlotte | |
| Jared Goldwire | DT | Louisville | |
| Darius Harper | OT | Cincinnati | |
| Hunter Kampmoyer | TE | Oregon | |
| Alex Kessman | K | Pittsburgh | |
| Ryan Langan | LS | Georgia Southern | |
| Forrest Merrill | DT | Arkansas State | |
| Amen Ogbongbemiga | LB | Oklahoma State | |
| Kyle Spalding | OT | San Diego State | |
| Eli Stove | WR | Auburn | |

== Staff ==
2021 Los Angeles Chargers staff
| Front office: Chairman/owner/president – Dean Spanos; Vice chairman – Michael Spanos; Executive vice president/COO/CFO – Jeanne M. Bonk; CEO/president of business operations – A. G. Spanos; General manager – Tom Telesco; President of football operations – John Spanos; Executive vice president of football administration/player finance – Ed McGuire; Director of pro scouting – Dennis Abraham; Senior director of pro personnel – Louis Clark; Director of player personnel – JoJo Wooden; Director of college scouting – Kevin Kelly; Head coaches: Head coach – Brandon Staley; Offensive coaches: Offensive coordinator – Joe Lombardi; Passing game coordinator/quarterbacks – Shane Day; Running backs – Derrick Foster; Wide receivers – Chris Beatty; Tight ends – Kevin Koger; Run game coordinator/offensive line – Frank Smith; Assistant offensive line – Shaun Sarrett; Offensive assistant – Dan Shamash; Offensive quality control – Chandler Whitmer | Defensive coaches: Defensive coordinator – Renaldo Hill; Defensive line – Giff Smith; Linebackers – Michael Wilhoite; Run game coordinator/outside linebackers – Jay Rodgers; Secondary – Derrick Ansley; Assistant secondary – Tom Donatell; Defensive quality control – Isaac Shewmaker; Alex G. Spanos coaching fellowship – John Timu; Special teams coaches: Special teams coordinator – Derius Swinton; Assistant special teams – Mayur Chaudhari; Strength and conditioning: Director of sports performance – Anthony Lomando; Head strength and conditioning – Jonathan Brooks; Assistant strength and conditioning – Lucius Jordan |

== Final roster ==
2021 Los Angeles Chargers roster
| Quarterbacks (QB): 4 Chase Daniel; 10 Justin Herbert; 2 Easton Stick; Running backs (RB): 30 Austin Ekeler; 22 Justin Jackson; 27 Joshua Kelley; 40 Gabe Nabers FB; 35 Larry Rountree III; Wide receivers (WR): 13 Keenan Allen; 15 Jalen Guyton; 5 Josh Palmer; 7 Andre Roberts; 81 Mike Williams; Tight ends (TE): 82 Stephen Anderson; 87 Jared Cook; 88 Tre' McKitty | Offensive linemen (OL): 71 Matt Feiler G; 64 Brenden Jaimes G; 68 Senio Kelemete G; 63 Corey Linsley C; 74 Storm Norton T; 79 Trey Pipkins T; 61 Scott Quessenberry C; 72 Michael Schofield G; 70 Rashawn Slater T; Defensive linemen (DL): 95 Christian Covington DE; 96 Breiden Fehoko DE; 92 Joe Gaziano DE; 93 Justin Jones DE; 98 Linval Joseph NT; 99 Jerry Tillery DE | Linebackers (LB): 97 Joey Bosa OLB; 52 Kyler Fackrell OLB; 9 Kenneth Murray ILB; 31 Nick Niemann ILB; 42 Uchenna Nwosu OLB; 57 Amen Ogbongbemiga ILB; 94 Chris Rumph II OLB; 49 Drue Tranquill ILB; 44 Kyzir White ILB; Defensive backs (DB): 24 Nasir Adderley FS; 20 Tevaughn Campbell CB; 43 Michael Davis CB; 32 Alohi Gilman SS; 37 Kemon Hall CB; 25 Chris Harris Jr. CB; 28 Davontae Harris CB; 33 Derwin James SS; 36 Trey Marshall SS; 26 Asante Samuel Jr. CB; Special teams (ST): 6 Dustin Hopkins K; 1 Ty Long P; 54 Matt Overton LS | Practice squad: 83 Michael Bandy WR; 34 Darius Bradwell RB; 90 Andrew Brown DE; 50 Cole Christiansen ILB; 46 Ben DeLuca SS; 51 Emeke Egbule OLB; 80 Maurice Ffrench WR; 84 K. J. Hill WR; 67 Ryan Hunter G; 47 Hunter Kampmoyer TE; 91 Forrest Merrill NT; 11 Jason Moore WR; 12 Joe Reed WR (PS/I); 77 Caraun Reid DE; 73 Foster Sarell T; 38 Kiondre Thomas CB; 16 Tristan Vizcaino K; Reserve: 76 Oday Aboushi G (IR); 75 Bryan Bulaga T (IR); 53 Damon Lloyd ILB (IR); 89 Donald Parham TE (IR); 23 Ryan Smith CB (IR); 29 Mark Webb FS (IR); Rookies in italics 53 active, 6 reserve, 16 practice squad (1 exempt) |

== Preseason ==
Staley announced shortly before the Chargers' preseason games that the majority of his starters would play in none of the games. With Chase Daniel and Easton Stick splitting time at quarterback, the Chargers scored only two touchdowns in their three games: a Darius Bradwell run against the Rams (which was the first NFL game in SoFi Stadium with fans in attendance) and a pass from Stick to Palmer against San Francisco. Los Angeles crossed midfield only twice in their third game as the Seahawks shut them out.

| Week | Date | Opponent | Result | Record | Venue | Recap |
|---|---|---|---|---|---|---|
| 1 | August 14 | at Los Angeles Rams | W 13–6 | 1–0 | SoFi Stadium | Recap |
| 2 | August 22 | San Francisco 49ers | L 10–15 | 1–1 | SoFi Stadium | Recap |
| 3 | August 28 | at Seattle Seahawks | L 0–27 | 1–2 | Lumen Field | Recap |

== Regular season ==
=== Overview ===
Los Angeles had a strong start to the season. They won four of their first five games, including beating the defending AFC champion Chiefs at Arrowhead Stadium. Starting with a one-sided defeat at Baltimore, they lost four games out of six, before back-to-back wins improved their record to 8–5. At that point, they were able to secure the AFC West title by winning their remaining four games. In the event, they lost three of the four, with two overtime defeats, including the season finale at Las Vegas when, needing a tie to reach the playoffs, they were beaten 35–32 on a field goal as time expired in the extra period. It was the 9th time out of 14 in franchise history the Chargers had missed the playoffs after starting a season 4–1. League-wide, 4–1 starts were converted into playoff appearances over 72% of the time over the same period.

Justin Herbert, coming off an Offensive Rookie of the Year award in the 2020 season, had another strong campaign while leading the league's 4th-ranked offense. Aided by the NFL's addition of a 17th regular-season game in 2021, he broke club records for completions (443, from 672 attempts), touchdowns (38) and passing yards (5,014), earning an appearance in his first Pro Bowl (where he was named offensive MVP). His two leading receivers, Williams and Allen, ranked 12th and 13th in the league for receiving yards with over 1,100 each, Allen having 30 more catches (106 to 76) while Williams averaged more yards per catch (15.1 to 10.7). Running back Austin Ekeler was third on the team for receptions (70) and receiving yards (647), and second only to Williams with 8 touchdown receptions.

Los Angeles ran a pass-oriented offense with 674 passing plays throughout the season (3rd in the league), but only 423 rushing attempts (22nd in the league). Ekeler was the top rusher, with 206 carries for 911 yards, 12th most in the league. This gave him 1,553 yards from scrimmage, 6th in the league. He also had 12 rushing touchdowns (5th in the league), giving him a total of 20 touchdowns, tied with Jonathan Taylor for the league-high. He joined LaDainian Tomlinson as the only Chargers to produce 20+ touchdown seasons. With a pair of two-point conversions, Ekeler finished with a team-high 124 points.

Staley was noted for an aggressive 4th down policy, frequently going for conversions in situations where a punt or field goal try might be expected. This policy played a role in several early-season wins. Later in the season, Staley was criticized after failed conversion attempts in overtime losses to the Chiefs and Raiders. Since the league began recording the statistic in 1991, the Chargers set NFL records for most successful 4th down conversions in a season with 22 from 34 attempts (broken by the Cleveland Browns the following season) and in a game with 6 from 7 attempts in the season finale.

The Charger defense was less successful than their offense, ranking 23rd in the league. They were particularly vulnerable against the run, finishing in the bottom five for yards and touchdowns conceded, as well as yards per rush; this weakness proved crucial in the season-ending loss to the Raiders. Los Angeles had the league's worst defense on 3rd down, their opponents converting 49.5% of the time; conversely, they were top on 4th down, allowing only a 31.8% conversion rate. Their leading tacklers were linebacker Kyzir White (144) and safety Derwin James (118). They were the first pair of Charger teammates to register 100+ tackles in the same season since Junior Seau and Rodney Harrison in 2000. James, who had missed the entire 2020 season through injury, also had two interceptions, three forced fumbles and two sacks while earning a Pro Bowl nomination. The Chargers' leading sacker, Joey Bosa, was also nominated for the Pro Bowl (his fourth appearance); he had double-digit sacks for the fourth time in his six-year career, with 10 1/2. He forced 7 fumbles, tied for second most in the NFL. All 7 of these were strip sacks (fumbles forced while sacking the quarterback), a record since the statistic was first recorded in 1999.

On special teams, Vizcaino made 10 of his 15 extra points in the first six games while converting 6 of 7 field goals; he was waived during the Chargers' bye week. His replacement, Hopkins, had better percentages, going 30 of 32 on extra points and 18 of 20 on field goals. Punter Ty Long averaged 45.5 yards per punt, 20th in the league. Return specialist Roberts averaged 5.5 yards per punt return and 32.8 yards per kickoff return. Including his statistics from before the trade to Los Angeles, he was 2nd in the league with 27.3 yards per kickoff return.

=== Schedule ===
| Week | Date | Opponent | Result | Record | Venue | Recap |
|---|---|---|---|---|---|---|
| 1 | September 12 | at Washington Football Team | **W** 20–16 | 1–0 | FedExField | Recap |
| 2 | September 19 | Dallas Cowboys | **L** 17–20 | 1–1 | SoFi Stadium | Recap |
| 3 | September 26 | at **Kansas City Chiefs** | **W** 30–24 | 2–1 | Arrowhead Stadium | Recap |
| 4 | October 4 | **Las Vegas Raiders** | **W** 28–14 | 3–1 | SoFi Stadium | Recap |
| 5 | October 10 | Cleveland Browns | **W** 47–42 | 4–1 | SoFi Stadium | Recap |
| 6 | October 17 | at Baltimore Ravens | **L** 6–34 | 4–2 | M&T Bank Stadium | Recap |
| 7 | Bye | | | | | |
| 8 | October 31 | New England Patriots | **L** 24–27 | 4–3 | SoFi Stadium | Recap |
| 9 | November 7 | at Philadelphia Eagles | **W** 27–24 | 5–3 | Lincoln Financial Field | Recap |
| 10 | November 14 | Minnesota Vikings | **L** 20–27 | 5–4 | SoFi Stadium | Recap |
| 11 | November 21 | Pittsburgh Steelers | **W** 41–37 | 6–4 | SoFi Stadium | Recap |
| 12 | November 28 | at **Denver Broncos** | **L** 13–28 | 6–5 | Empower Field at Mile High | Recap |
| 13 | December 5 | at Cincinnati Bengals | **W** 41–22 | 7–5 | Paul Brown Stadium | Recap |
| 14 | December 12 | New York Giants | **W** 37–21 | 8–5 | SoFi Stadium | Recap |
| 15 | December 16 | **Kansas City Chiefs** | **L** 28–34 (OT) | 8–6 | SoFi Stadium | Recap |
| 16 | December 26 | at Houston Texans | **L** 29–41 | 8–7 | NRG Stadium | Recap |
| 17 | January 2 | **Denver Broncos** | **W** 34–13 | 9–7 | SoFi Stadium | Recap |
| 18 | January 9 | at **Las Vegas Raiders** | **L** 32–35 (OT) | 9–8 | Allegiant Stadium | Recap |

Note: Intra-division opponents are in bold text.

=== Game summaries ===
==== Week 1: at Washington Football Team ====
Week 1: Los Angeles Chargers at Washington Football Team – Game summary

| Quarter | 1 | 2 | 3 | 4 | Total |
|---|---|---|---|---|---|
| **Chargers** | 7 | 6 | 0 | 7 | **20** |
| Football Team | 3 | 6 | 7 | 0 | **16** |

at FedExField, Landover, Maryland

- Date: September 12
- Game time: 1:00 p.m. EDT/10:00 a.m. PDT
- Game weather: Sunny, 81 °F (27 °C)
- Game attendance: 52,753
- Referee: Alex Kemp
- TV announcers (CBS): Spero Dedes and Jay Feely
- Recap, Game Book

Game information

**First quarter**

- LAC – Austin Ekeler 3-yard run (Tristan Vizcaino kick), 9:14. Chargers 7–0. **Drive: 10 plays, 75 yards, 5:46.**
- WAS – Dustin Hopkins 30-yard field goal, 2:57. Chargers 7–3. **Drive: 6 plays, 36 yards, 3:07.**

**Second quarter**

- WAS – Dustin Hopkins 43-yard field goal, 13:36. Chargers 7–6. **Drive: 7 plays, 46 yards, 2:49.**
- LAC – Tristan Vizcaino 33-yard field goal, 9:06. Chargers 10–6. **Drive: 10 plays, 76 yards, 4:30.**
- LAC – Tristan Vizcaino 27-yard field goal, 0:45. Chargers 13–6. **Drive: 18 plays, 65 yards, 7:52.**
- WAS – Dustin Hopkins 48-yard field goal, 0:00. Chargers 13–9. **Drive: 5 plays, 45 yards, 0:45.**

**Third quarter**

- WAS – Logan Thomas 11-yard pass from Taylor Heinicke (Dustin Hopkins kick), 11:20. Football Team 16–13. **Drive: 8 plays, 81 yards, 3:40.**

**Fourth quarter**

- LAC – Mike Williams 3-yard pass from Justin Herbert (Tristan Vizcaino kick), 11:21. Chargers 20–16. **Drive: 3 plays, 3 yards, 0:45.**

**Top passers**

- LAC – Justin Herbert – 31/47, 337 yards, TD, INT
- WAS – Taylor Heinicke – 11/15, 122 yards, TD

**Top rushers**

- LAC – Austin Ekeler – 15 rushes, 57 yards, TD
- WAS – Antonio Gibson – 20 rushes, 90 yards

**Top receivers**

- LAC – Keenan Allen – 9 receptions, 100 yards
- WAS – Terry McLaurin – 4 receptions, 62 yards

Los Angeles scored on their opening drive of the season, facing only one third down as they drove 75 yards for Austin Ekeler's touchdown run. After two field goals for Washington and two for the Chargers, it was 13–6 with 45 seconds to play in the half. Joey Bosa's roughing the passer penalty helped Washington get in range for another field goal as time expired.

Washington took their first lead with a touchdown on the opening possession of the second half. Los Angeles responded by driving from their own 25 to a 2nd and goal from the Washington 7, whereupon Justin Herbert was hit by Montez Sweat during his throwing motion. The ball struck the ground near the goal line and was ignored by players from both teams as it rolled through the back of the end zone; however, it was ruled a fumble rather than an incompletion, resulting in a touchback and possession being turned over to Washington.

Following a missed Washington field goal, the Chargers moved back into the red zone, but Herbert's pass was overthrown and intercepted by William Jackson III at the 4-yard line. On the next play, Kyzir White forced a fumble that Kyler Fackrell recovered. Herbert and Mike Williams combined for the winning touchdown three plays later. After forcing a punt, Los Angeles took over on their own 18 with 6:43 to play, and Washington holding all three timeouts. The Chargers were able to run the clock out from there - Herbert found Keenan Allen for 17 yards on 3rd and 16, and followed up with three further completions to convert third downs, to K. J. Hill, Williams, and Allen.

Overall, the Chargers converted 14 of 19 third down attempts. The 14 successes were a new club record.

==== Week 2: vs. Dallas Cowboys ====
Week 2: Dallas Cowboys at Los Angeles Chargers – Game summary

| Quarter | 1 | 2 | 3 | 4 | Total |
|---|---|---|---|---|---|
| **Cowboys** | 14 | 0 | 0 | 6 | **20** |
| Chargers | 3 | 8 | 3 | 3 | **17** |

at SoFi Stadium, Inglewood, California

- Date: September 19
- Game time: 1:25 p.m. PDT
- Game weather: None (retractable roof closed)
- Game attendance: 70,240
- Referee: Tony Corrente
- TV announcers (CBS): Jim Nantz, Tony Romo and Tracy Wolfson
- Recap, Game Book

Game information

**First quarter**

- DAL – Tony Pollard 4-yard run (Greg Zuerlein kick), 8:09. Cowboys 7–0. **Drive: 15 plays, 78 yards, 6:51.**
- LAC – Tristan Vizcaino 46-yard field goal, 3:32. Cowboys 7–3. **Drive: 5 plays, 17 yards, 2:24.**
- DAL – Ezekiel Elliott 5-yard run (Greg Zuerlein kick), 0:17. Cowboys 14–3. **Drive: 7 plays, 75 yards, 3:15.**

**Second quarter**

- LAC – Mike Williams 12-yard pass from Justin Herbert (Austin Ekeler run), 9:49. Cowboys 14–11. **Drive: 10 plays, 75 yards, 5:28.**

**Third quarter**

- LAC – Tristan Vizcaino 32-yard field goal, 9:22. 14–14. **Drive: 13 plays, 61 yards, 5:38.**

**Fourth quarter**

- DAL – Greg Zuerlein 34-yard field goal, 10:25. Cowboys 17–14. **Drive: 10 plays, 64 yards, 4:40.**
- LAC – Tristan Vizcaino 29-yard field goal, 3:54. 17–17. **Drive: 12 plays, 64 yards, 6:31.**
- DAL – Greg Zuerlein 56-yard field goal, 0:00. Cowboys 20–17. **Drive: 11 plays, 49 yards, 3:54.**

**Top passers**

- DAL – Dak Prescott – 23/27, 237 yards, INT
- LAC – Justin Herbert – 31/41, 338 yards, TD, 2 INT

**Top rushers**

- DAL – Tony Pollard – 13 rushes, 109 yards, TD
- LAC – Austin Ekeler – 9 rushes, 54 yards

**Top receivers**

- DAL – CeeDee Lamb – 8 receptions, 81 yards
- LAC – Keenan Allen – 4 receptions, 108 yards

Midway through the game's opening drive, Dallas appeared to have been stopped on a 4th and 1 at their own 48, but White was flagged for pass interference; the Cowboys went on to score a touchdown. Herbert and Dak Prescott were then both intercepted (rookie Asante Samuel claiming his first career interception for the Chargers), before a Tristan Vizcaino field goal and another Dallas touchdown made it 14–3 late in the opening quarter. Herbert appeared to have been intercepted again on the next drive, but Jayron Kearse was ruled to have committed pass interference before making the interception. Later in the drive, Herbert converted both on 3rd and 11 (through a 12-yard pass to Jared Cook) and 3rd and 13 (through a 27-yard pass to Williams. One play later, Williams scored, and a two-point conversion pulled the Chargers within three. A roughing the kicker penalty on a punt prolonged the next Charger drive, but Vizcaino missed a 44-yard kick, striking the right upright with 3 seconds to play in the half. Dallas came close to scoring a 51-yard touchdown as time expired, with Derwin James making a tackle at his 3-yard line.

On the opening drive of the second half, Herbert converted on 4th and inches with a quarterback sneak, then found Allen for 42 yards on 3rd and 15, setting up a field goal and a 14–14 tie. Donald Parham appeared to have scored a 36-yard go-ahead touchdown the next time Los Angeles had the ball, but it was nullified by offensive holding, called on Cook. Later in the drive, the Chargers reached 3rd and 6 at the 9, but Herbert was intercepted when his intended receiver slipped over in the end zone. Dallas then drove into the red zone but had to settle for a field goal after a third down sack by Fackrell. On the following drive, Allen's 30-yard catch gave the Chargers a 1st and goal at the 2. Herbert and Cook appeared to have combined for a touchdown on the next play, but it was again nullified by a controversial penalty call, this time an illegal shift. They ultimately settled for another game-tying Vizcaino field goal with 3:54 to play. Dallas twice faced third down conversions in their territory on the ensuing drive, but Ezekiel Elliott converted both with a catch and a run. The Cowboys moved into range for a 56-yard field goal, which Greg Zuerlein comfortably converted as time expired.

It was the Charger's first home game at SoFi Stadium with fans in attendance, though the majority of the capacity crowd was supporting the Cowboys.

==== Week 3: at Kansas City Chiefs ====
Week 3: Los Angeles Chargers at Kansas City Chiefs – Game summary

| Quarter | 1 | 2 | 3 | 4 | Total |
|---|---|---|---|---|---|
| **Chargers** | 0 | 14 | 0 | 16 | **30** |
| Chiefs | 0 | 3 | 14 | 7 | **24** |

at Arrowhead Stadium, Kansas City, Missouri

- Date: September 26
- Game time: 12:00 p.m. CDT/10:00 a.m. PDT
- Game weather: Clear, 81 °F (27 °C)
- Game attendance: 72,980
- Referee: Shawn Hochuli
- TV announcers (CBS): Jim Nantz, Tony Romo and Tracy Wolfson
- Recap, Game Book

Game information

**First quarter**

- No scoring plays

**Second quarter**

- LAC – Keenan Allen 4-yard pass from Justin Herbert (kick failed), 13:57. Chargers 6–0. **Drive: 9 plays, 51 yards, 3:51.**
- LAC – Austin Ekeler 16-yard pass from Justin Herbert (Justin Herbert–Mike Williams pass), 7:36. Chargers 14–0. **Drive: 6 plays, 53 yards, 3:19.**
- KC – Harrison Butker 34-yard field goal, 0:19. Chargers 14–3. **Drive: 11 plays, 70 yards, 2:14.**

**Third quarter**

- KC – Jody Fortson 2-yard pass from Patrick Mahomes (Harrison Butker kick), 9:15. Chargers 14–10. **Drive: 12 plays, 75 yards, 5:45.**
- KC – Clyde Edwards-Helaire 10-yard pass from Patrick Mahomes (Harrison Butker kick), 3:35. Chiefs 17–14. **Drive: 10 plays, 70 yards, 4:09.**

**Fourth quarter**

- LAC – Mike Williams 20-yard pass from Justin Herbert (Tristan Vizcaino kick), 13:39. Chargers 21–17. **Drive: 11 plays, 75 yards, 4:56.**
- KC – Mecole Hardman 8-yard pass from Patrick Mahomes (Harrison Butker kick), 6:43. Chiefs 24–21. **Drive: 12 plays, 72 yards, 6:56.**
- LAC – Tristan Vizcaino 24-yard field goal, 2:14. Tied 24–24. **Drive: 10 plays, 69 yards, 4:29.**
- LAC – Mike Williams 4-yard pass from Justin Herbert (kick failed), 0:32. Chargers 30–24. **Drive: 8 plays, 59 yards, 1:10.**

**Top passers**

- LAC – Justin Herbert – 26/38, 281 yards, 4 TD
- KC – Patrick Mahomes – 27/40, 260 yards, 3 TD, 2 INT

**Top rushers**

- LAC – Austin Ekeler – 11 rushes, 55 yards
- KC – Clyde Edwards-Helaire – 17 rushes, 100 yards

**Top receivers**

- LAC – Mike Williams – 7 receptions, 122 yards, 2 TD
- KC – Travis Kelce – 7 receptions, 104 yards

Kansas City's first three drives all crossed into Charger territory, but each was ended by a turnover - a diving interception by Samuel and two fumble recoveries, both forced by Tevaughn Campbell and recovered by Michael Davis. Los Angeles turned the latter two turnovers into Herbert touchdown passes. The Chiefs responded with a field goal shortly before halftime, then dominated the first eleven minutes of the third quarter with a pair of touchdown drives, either side of a Charger three-and-out.

Trailing for the first time, Los Angeles drove into opposition territory and faced a 4th and 8 from the 28 to start the final quarter. Herbert converted this with a 9-yard pass to Allen and found Williams for a 20-yard touchdown two plays later. The Chiefs responded with a 12-play, 72-yard touchdown drive in which they did not face a third down. A 43-yard catch by Williams immediately moved the Chargers back into Kansas City territory, and a pass interference penalty later gave them a 1st and goal at the 1. Two plays later, Herbert passed to Gabe Nabers for an apparent touchdown, but Cook was penalized for an illegal shift, and Los Angeles eventually had to settle for a game-tying field goal with 2:14 to play. Three plays later, Alohi Gilman intercepted a deep Patrick Mahomes pass, giving the Chargers the ball at their own 41. They advanced to a 4th and 4 at the Chief's 30 with 48 seconds to play, and again opted to go for it - they were pushed back 5 yards by a false start, but Jalen Guyton then drew a pass interference penalty to keep the drive going. Williams had catches of 16 and 4 yards on the next two plays, the latter for the winning touchdown with 32 seconds to play; Mahomes moved his team to the Charger 49, from where his long pass was knocked down at the goal line as time expired.

==== Week 4: vs. Las Vegas Raiders ====
Week 4: Las Vegas Raiders at Los Angeles Chargers – Game summary

| Quarter | 1 | 2 | 3 | 4 | Total |
|---|---|---|---|---|---|
| Raiders | 0 | 0 | 14 | 0 | **14** |
| **Chargers** | 7 | 14 | 0 | 7 | **28** |

at SoFi Stadium, Inglewood, California

- Date: October 4
- Game time: 5:15 p.m. PDT
- Game weather: None (retractable roof closed)
- Game attendance: 70,240
- Referee: John Hussey
- TV announcers (ESPN): Steve Levy, Brian Griese, Louis Riddick and Lisa Salters
- Recap, Game Book

Game information

**First quarter**

- LAC – Donald Parham 4-yard pass from Justin Herbert (Tristan Vizcaino kick), 8:01. Chargers 7–0. **Drive: 12 plays, 75 yards, 6:59.**

**Second quarter**

- LAC – Jared Cook 10-yard pass from Justin Herbert (Tristan Vizcaino kick), 4:16. Chargers 14–0. **Drive: 6 plays, 80 yards, 3:35.**
- LAC – Austin Ekeler 14-yard pass from Justin Herbert (Tristan Vizcaino kick), 0:29. Chargers 21–0. **Drive: 9 plays, 69 yards, 2:15.**

**Third quarter**

- LV – Hunter Renfrow 10-yard pass from Derek Carr (Daniel Carlson kick), 9:01. Chargers 21–7. **Drive: 11 plays, 78 yards, 5:59.**
- LV – Darren Waller 3-yard pass from Derek Carr (Daniel Carlson kick), 1:44. Chargers 21–14. **Drive: 6 plays, 81 yards, 2:55.**

**Fourth quarter**

- LAC – Austin Ekeler 11-yard run (Tristan Vizcaino kick), 5:20. Chargers 28–14. **Drive: 10 plays, 58 yards, 5:18.**

**Top passers**

- LV – Derek Carr – 21/34, 196 yards, 2 TD, INT
- LAC – Justin Herbert – 25/38, 222 yards, 3 TD

**Top rushers**

- LV – Josh Jacobs – 13 rushes, 40 yards
- LAC – Austin Ekeler – 15 rushes, 117 yards, TD

**Top receivers**

- LV – Henry Ruggs III – 3 receptions, 60 yards
- LAC – Jared Cook – 6 receptions, 70 yards, TD

Los Angeles opened the game with a 75-yard touchdown drive, as they had done in Week 1 against Washington. Later in the quarter, they attempted a fake punt from the Raider 41, but Ty Long's pass was broken up by Hunter Renfrow. Las Vegas crossed midfield only once in the first half - they also failed on a fourth down conversion attempt, with White tackling Josh Jacobs well short of the first down marker. The Chargers scored on their final two possessions of the half, with Herbert's second and third touchdown passes of the game. Herbert converted four third downs across the three first half scoring drives, with completions to four different receivers. These were the only third down conversions by the Chargers all night, as they failed their other 9 attempts.

Derek Carr threw a touchdown pass to Renfrow on the first drive of the second half. The Chargers then converted a 4th and 2 from their own 45, but soon had to punt after Herbert was sacked on third down. A 45-yard pass interference penalty on Samuel helped the Raiders drive 81 yards for another Carr touchdown pass, pulling the Raiders within seven points. Carr's 51-yard pass early in the final quarter had the Raiders threatening again, but Christian Covington's third down sack forced a 51-yard field goal, which Daniel Carlson missed wide left. Los Angeles then faced a 4th and 2 from midfield, which they converted with Cook's 13-yard reception - Ekeler scored six plays later, and Derwin James claimed the game's only turnover shortly afterwards, intercepting Carr to effectively clinch the win with 3:22 to play.

==== Week 5: vs. Cleveland Browns ====
Week 5: Cleveland Browns at Los Angeles Chargers – Game summary

| Quarter | 1 | 2 | 3 | 4 | Total |
|---|---|---|---|---|---|
| Browns | 3 | 17 | 7 | 15 | **42** |
| **Chargers** | 7 | 6 | 8 | 26 | **47** |

at SoFi Stadium, Inglewood, California

- Date: October 10
- Game time: 1:05 p.m. PDT
- Game weather: None (retractable roof closed)
- Game attendance: 70,240
- Referee: Brad Allen
- TV announcers (CBS): Kevin Harlan, Trent Green and Melanie Collins
- Recap, Game Book

Game information

**First quarter**

- CLE – Chase McLaughlin 35-yard field goal, 7:39. Browns 3–0. **Drive: 10 plays, 75 yards, 6:32.**
- LAC – Donald Parham 22-yard pass from Justin Herbert (Tristan Vizcaino kick), 2:44. Chargers 7–3. **Drive: 10 plays, 85 yards, 4:55.**

**Second quarter**

- CLE – Rashard Higgins 7-yard pass from Baker Mayfield (Chase McLaughlin kick), 12:46. Browns 10–7. **Drive: 8 plays, 72 yards, 4:58.**
- LAC – Mike Williams 72-yard pass from Justin Herbert (kick failed), 11:43. Chargers 13–10. **Drive: 4 plays, 82 yards, 1:03.**
- CLE – Kareem Hunt 3-yard run (Chase McLaughlin kick), 0:54. Browns 17–13. **Drive: 11 plays, 53 yards, 6:00.**
- CLE – Chase McLaughlin 31-yard field goal, 0:00. Browns 20–13. **Drive: 4 plays, 9 yards, 0:38.**

**Third quarter**

- CLE – Nick Chubb 52-yard run (Chase McLaughlin kick), 12:18. Browns 27–13. **Drive: 5 plays, 75 yards, 2:42.**
- LAC – Justin Herbert 9-yard run (Justin Herbert–Donald Parham pass), 6:25. Browns 27–21. **Drive: 14 plays, 84 yards, 5:53.**

**Fourth quarter**

- LAC – Mike Williams 42-yard pass from Justin Herbert (Tristan Vizcaino kick), 11:22. Chargers 28–27. **Drive: 4 plays, 61 yards, 1:29.**
- CLE – David Njoku 71-yard pass from Baker Mayfield (Baker Mayfield–Austin Hooper pass), 10:40. Browns 35–28. **Drive: 2 plays, 78 yards, 0:42.**
- LAC – Austin Ekeler 4-yard run (Tristan Vizcaino kick), 7:24. Tied 35–35. **Drive: 11 plays, 75 yards, 3:16.**
- CLE – Kareem Hunt 8-yard run (Chase McLaughlin kick), 4:45. Browns 42–35. **Drive: 5 plays, 75 yards, 2:39.**
- LAC – Austin Ekeler 19-yard pass from Justin Herbert (kick failed), 3:15. Browns 42–41. **Drive: 6 plays, 75 yards, 1:30.**
- LAC – Austin Ekeler 3-yard run (run failed), 1:31. Chargers 47–42. **Drive: 5 plays, 48 yards, 0:31.**

**Top passers**

- CLE – Baker Mayfield – 23/32, 305 yards, 2 TD
- LAC – Justin Herbert – 26/43, 398 yards, 4 TD

**Top rushers**

- CLE – Nick Chubb – 21 rushes, 161 yards, TD
- LAC – Austin Ekeler – 17 rushes, 66 yards, 2 TD

**Top receivers**

- CLE – David Njoku – 7 receptions, 149 yards, TD
- LAC – Mike Williams – 8 receptions, 165 yards, 2 TD

With the score at 10–7 to Cleveland, Williams got open behind the Browns defense for a 72-yard touchdown. Vizcaino's missed extra point left the score at 13–10. The Browns were stopped on downs on their next possession when Odell Beckham dropped a pass at the Charger 15, but drove back into Los Angeles territory and scored via Kareem Hunt's 3-yard run on 4th and 1. An Ekeler fumble set up a Cleveland field goal as time expired in the half, and the Browns were ahead 27–13 early in the third quarter after Nick Chubb shrugged off two would-be tacklers and completed a 52-yard touchdown run.

The Chargers risked a 4th and 2 from their own 24 early in the following drive, which Ekeler converted with a 9-yard run. Later in the drive, Allen's 12-yard catch converted a 4th and 7 – Herbert scrambled for a touchdown two plays later. Los Angeles added a two-point conversion and retook the lead early in the fourth quarter when Williams was again left completely open for a long touchdown. Two plays later, David Njoku broke a weak tackle by Nasir Adderley at the Cleveland 45 and sprinted clear to complete a 72-yard touchdown. A two-point conversion put Cleveland up 35–28. A controversial pass interference penalty prolonged the next Charger drive, called against A. J. Green for 33 yards as he and Williams contested a Herbert pass thrown on 4th and 4 from the Charger 41. The Chargers also converted a 4th and 8 through Allen's 20-yard catch, and Ekeler scored from the 4 on the next play.

After Cleveland needed only five plays to retake the lead, Allen's 37-yard catch on 3rd and 5 was the biggest play on the next drive; Ekeler's touchdown catch meant that the teams had combined to score five touchdowns in as many drives. However, Vizcaino's second missed extra point of the game (and fourth of the season) left the Browns still ahead, 42–41 up with 3:15 to play. The Los Angeles defense forced a three-and-out, and Cook's 29-yard catch immediately moved them into field goal range. Three running plays forced Cleveland to use all of their timeouts and gave the Chargers a 1st and goal at the 3. Ekeler tried to go down at the 1 on the next play, but Cleveland defenders forced him into the end zone, ensuring that the Browns would have one more possession with 1:31 remaining. After taking over a minute to move the ball 21 yards, Baker Mayfield threw three incompletions from his own 46, the last one going to the ground in the end zone to ensure the Chargers' victory.

Williams set a new career-high with 165 receiving yards, surpassing his previous best by 43 yards. The combined total of 89 points was the fourth-highest for a Chargers game, and the highest since a 49–41 win over Cincinnati 15 years earlier; the 41 combined points in the final quarter was a new high for any single quarter involving the Chargers. Los Angeles became the first team to win despite conceding 40+ points and forcing no takeaways.

==== Week 6: at Baltimore Ravens ====
Week 6: Los Angeles Chargers at Baltimore Ravens – Game summary

| Quarter | 1 | 2 | 3 | 4 | Total |
|---|---|---|---|---|---|
| Chargers | 0 | 6 | 0 | 0 | **6** |
| **Ravens** | 7 | 10 | 10 | 7 | **34** |

at M&T Bank Stadium, Baltimore, Maryland

- Date: October 17
- Game time: 1:00 p.m. EDT/10:00 a.m. PDT
- Game weather: Partly Cloudy, 63 °F (17 °C)
- Game attendance: 70,704
- Referee: Bill Vinovich
- TV announcers (CBS): Greg Gumbel, Adam Archuleta and AJ Ross
- Recap, Game Book

Game information

**First quarter**

- BAL – Latavius Murray 14-yard run (Justin Tucker kick), 5:12. Ravens 7–0. **Drive: 12 plays, 90 yards, 6:39.**

**Second quarter**

- BAL – Le'Veon Bell 2-yard run (Justin Tucker kick), 13:24. Ravens 14–0. **Drive: 8 plays, 74 yards, 4:55.**
- BAL – Justin Tucker 52-yard field goal, 7:03. Ravens 17–0. **Drive: 4 plays, 5 yards, 2:06.**
- LAC – Jared Cook 1-yard pass from Justin Herbert (kick failed), 4:04. Ravens 17–6. **Drive: 2 plays, 27 yards, 0:16.**

**Third quarter**

- BAL – Mark Andrews 9-yard pass from Lamar Jackson (Justin Tucker kick), 7:39. Ravens 24–6. **Drive: 12 plays, 52 yards, 7:21.**
- BAL – Justin Tucker 39-yard field goal, 5:02. Ravens 27–6. **Drive: 4 plays, 3 yards, 0:53.**

**Fourth quarter**

- BAL – Devonta Freeman 9-yard run (Justin Tucker kick), 14:55. Ravens 34–6. **Drive: 9 plays, 65 yards, 4:45.**

**Top passers**

- LAC – Justin Herbert – 22/39, 195 yards, TD, INT
- BAL – Lamar Jackson – 19/27, 167 yards, TD, 2 INT

**Top rushers**

- LAC – Justin Herbert – 2 rushes, 12 yards
- BAL – Devonta Freeman – 9 rushes, 53 yards, TD

**Top receivers**

- LAC – Keenan Allen – 5 receptions, 50 yards
- BAL – Mark Andrews – 5 receptions, 68 yards, TD

The Ravens' opening two drives covered a combined 164 yards and produced fourteen points while requiring only a single third down conversion between them. Later, Los Angeles turned the ball over on downs at their own 39, setting up a Ravens field goal and a 17–0 lead. White set up the lone Charger touchdown with the first of his two interceptions on the day, but the Ravens responded with a touchdown on the opening drive of the second half, and were not threatened again.

Baltimore outrushed Los Angeles 187–26, while holding the ball for over 38 minutes. Vizcaino missed his fifth extra point of the season after the Charger touchdown; he was released on October 26 and replaced with former Washington kicker Dustin Hopkins.

==== Week 8: vs. New England Patriots ====
Week 8: New England Patriots at Los Angeles Chargers – Game summary

| Quarter | 1 | 2 | 3 | 4 | Total |
|---|---|---|---|---|---|
| **Patriots** | 7 | 6 | 3 | 11 | **27** |
| Chargers | 7 | 7 | 3 | 7 | **24** |

at SoFi Stadium, Inglewood, California

- Date: October 31
- Game time: 1:05 p.m. PDT
- Game weather: None (retractable roof closed)
- Game attendance: 70,240
- Referee: Ronald Torbert
- TV announcers (CBS): Ian Eagle, Charles Davis and Evan Washburn
- Recap, Game Book

Game information

**First quarter**

- LAC – Austin Ekeler 5-yard run (Dustin Hopkins kick), 10:54. Chargers 7–0. **Drive: 8 plays, 75 yards, 4:06.**
- NE – Damien Harris 1-yard run (Nick Folk kick), 6:26. Tied 7–7. **Drive: 10 plays, 75 yards, 4:28.**

**Second quarter**

- LAC – Keenan Allen 5-yard pass from Justin Herbert (Dustin Hopkins kick), 12:35. Chargers 14–7. **Drive: 5 plays, 86 yards, 2:16.**
- NE – Nick Folk 24-yard field goal, 3:29. Chargers 14–10. **Drive: 9 plays, 30 yards, 3:22.**
- NE – Nick Folk 48-yard field goal, 0:10. Chargers 14–13. **Drive: 5 plays, 10 yards, 0:47.**

**Third quarter**

- NE – Nick Folk 48-yard field goal, 3:39. Patriots 16–14. **Drive: 10 plays, 31 yards, 5:09.**
- LAC – Dustin Hopkins 48-yard field goal, 0:39. Chargers 17–16. **Drive: 6 plays, 45 yards, 3:00.**

**Fourth quarter**

- NE – Adrian Phillips 26-yard interception return (Mac Jones-Jakobi Meyers pass), 10:11. Patriots 24–17.
- NE – Nick Folk 30-yard field goal, 2:19. Patriots 27–17. **Drive: 14 plays, 54 yards, 6:56.**
- LAC – Josh Palmer 24-yard pass from Justin Herbert (Dustin Hopkins kick), 0:40. Patriots 27–24. **Drive: 10 plays, 72 yards, 1:39.**

**Top passers**

- NE – Mac Jones – 18/35, 218 yards
- LAC – Justin Herbert – 18/35, 223 yards, 2 TD, 2 INT

**Top rushers**

- NE – Damien Harris – 23 rushes, 80 yards, TD
- LAC – Justin Jackson – 3 rushes, 79 yards

**Top receivers**

- NE – Nelson Agholor – 3 receptions, 60 yards
- LAC – Keenan Allen – 6 receptions, 77 yards, TD

As they had done in Week 1 and Week 4, the Chargers opened the game with a 75-yard touchdown drive - Allen caught a 41-yard pass, and Ekeler converted a 4th and 1 with a 2-yard run before scoring on the next play. New England tied the score on their first drive. Early in the 2nd quarter, Justin Jackson swept left on 2nd and 10 from his own 14 and worked his way through a crowd near the line of scrimmage before breaking away from the defense, eventually being caught at the Patriot 11 after a gain of 75 yards. Coming into the game, Jackson had carried the ball only ten times all season, for 22 yards. Allen restored the Chargers' lead three plays later. New England drove inside the Los Angeles 10 on their next two possessions: the first time, Mac Jones threw incomplete on 4th and goal from the 1; the second time, they settled for a field goal. Late in the half, Ekeler couldn't hold onto a Herbert pass, with former Charger Adrian Phillips intercepting the deflected ball to set up another field goal, and a 14–13 halftime score.

The Patriots drove into Charger territory on the opening drive of the second half, but James forced a fumble that Adderley recovered. On their next drive, New England took the lead through Nick Folk's third field goal of the game. Ekeler opened the following drive with a 28-yard run and an 11-yard catch, setting up Dustin Hopkins to make his first field goal try as a Charger and restore the lead. Early in the final quarter, Herbert aimed a short pass at Cook, who had not yet turned back to receive it. The resulting wild throw was intercepted by Phillips and run back for the winning touchdown. After a further Folk field goal, rookie Josh Palmer scored his first career touchdown to pull Los Angeles within three, but another former Charger, Hunter Henry, then recovered an onside kick to ensure a Patriot victory.

For the Chargers, it was the seventh consecutive loss to New England. Los Angeles picked up 4 first downs on their opening possession, and 5 on their final possession, but only 8 from nine drives otherwise.

==== Week 9: at Philadelphia Eagles ====
Week 9: Los Angeles Chargers at Philadelphia Eagles – Game summary

| Quarter | 1 | 2 | 3 | 4 | Total |
|---|---|---|---|---|---|
| **Chargers** | 7 | 0 | 9 | 11 | **27** |
| Eagles | 0 | 10 | 7 | 7 | **24** |

at Lincoln Financial Field, Philadelphia, Pennsylvania

- Date: November 7
- Game time: 4:05 p.m. EST/1:05 p.m. PST
- Game weather: Mostly cloudy, 52 °F (11 °C)
- Game attendance: 69,796
- Referee: Jerome Boger
- TV announcers (CBS): Ian Eagle, Charles Davis and Evan Washburn
- Recap, Game Book

Game information

**First quarter**

- LAC – Stephen Anderson 2-yard pass from Justin Herbert (Dustin Hopkins kick), 0:50. Chargers 7–0. **Drive: 6 plays, 38 yards, 3:19.**

**Second quarter**

- PHI – Jordan Howard 4-yard run (Jake Elliott kick), 11:20. Tied 7–7. **Drive: 10 plays, 75 yards, 4:30.**
- PHI – Jake Elliott 24-yard field goal, 0:21. Eagles 10–7. **Drive: 16 plays, 68 yards, 7:04.**

**Third quarter**

- LAC – Dustin Hopkins 30-yard field goal, 10:33. Tied 10–10. **Drive: 9 plays, 57 yards, 4:27.**
- LAC – Donald Parham 8-yard pass from Justin Herbert (kick failed), 6:44. Chargers 16–10. **Drive: 4 plays, 66 yards, 1:56.**
- PHI – Kenneth Gainwell 1-yard run (Jake Elliott kick), 3:10. Eagles 17–16. **Drive: 10 plays, 85 yards, 3:34.**

**Fourth quarter**

- LAC – Justin Herbert 8-yard run (Justin Herbert-Jared Cook pass), 11:32. Chargers 24–17. **Drive: 10 plays, 61 yards, 6:38.**
- PHI – DeVonta Smith 28-yard pass from Jalen Hurts (Jake Elliott kick), 6:07. Tied 24–24. **Drive: 10 plays, 78 yards, 5:25.**
- LAC – Dustin Hopkins 29-yard field goal, 0:02. Chargers 27–24. **Drive: 15 plays, 64 yards, 6:05.**

**Top passers**

- LAC – Justin Herbert – 32/38, 356 yards, 2 TD
- PHI – Jalen Hurts – 11/17, 162 yards, TD

**Top rushers**

- LAC – Austin Ekeler – 17 rushes, 59 yards
- PHI – Jordan Howard – 17 rushes, 71 yards, TD

**Top receivers**

- LAC – Keenan Allen – 12 receptions, 104 yards
- PHI – DeVonta Smith – 5 receptions, 116 yards, TD

Philadelphia punted on their first possession, and pinned Los Angeles at their 1-yard line. The Chargers responded with a 15-play, 98-yard drive, but came up with no points after Allen was stopped a yard short on 4th and goal from the 2. It was the first 98-yard non-scoring drive in the NFL since 2002. After holding the Eagles to a three-and-out, Los Angeles started their next possession at the Philadelphia 38. Herbert's first touchdown pass came six plays later. After the Eagles tied the score, Los Angeles reached a 4th and 2 at the opposition's 27; they again went for a conversion, but Joshua Kelley was stopped a yard short with 7:25 to play in the half. A Philadelphia field goal drive ran all but 21 seconds off the clock, and the Eagles were 10–7 up at halftime.

Los Angeles tied the game with a field goal on the opening drive of the 3rd quarter, then forced a three-and-out. The game's next four drives all produced touchdowns. First, Herbert connected with Williams on a deep pass, covering 49 yards; three plays later, Parham stiff-armed a defender and scored on 3rd and 1 from the 8. On the following drive, Jalen Hurts scrambled for 12 yards on 3rd and 8, setting up an answering touchdown two plays later. Herbert then converted one third down with a completion to Allen and another with a quarterback sneak, before scrambling into the end zone two plays later. Hurts converted two more third downs by running on the next drive, before throwing the game-tying touchdown with 6:07 to play. Los Angeles forced the Eagles to call all their timeouts and used up all but 2 seconds of the clock with their response, which featured two fourth down conversions: Ekeler's 2-yard run up the middle on 4th and 1 from the Philadelphia 39, and Herbert's 1-yard sneak on 4th and 1 from the Philadelphia 28. Two plays after the second of these, Ekeler's 16-yard run made Hopkins' game-winning field goal a much shorter 29-yarder, which he converted without difficulty.

Herbert set a club record for the highest completion percentage in a game with a minimum of 30 completions, with 84.21%.

==== Week 10: vs. Minnesota Vikings ====
Week 10: Minnesota Vikings at Los Angeles Chargers – Game summary

| Quarter | 1 | 2 | 3 | 4 | Total |
|---|---|---|---|---|---|
| **Vikings** | 0 | 13 | 7 | 7 | **27** |
| Chargers | 0 | 10 | 7 | 3 | **20** |

at SoFi Stadium, Inglewood, California

- Date: November 14
- Game time: 1:05 p.m. PST
- Game weather: None (retractable roof closed)
- Game attendance: 70,240
- Referee: Clay Martin
- TV announcers (Fox): Kevin Kugler, Mark Sanchez and Laura Okmin
- Recap, Game Book

Game information

**First quarter**

- No scoring plays.

**Second quarter**

- MIN – Greg Joseph 46-yard field goal, 14:12. Vikings 3–0. **Drive: 10 plays, 59 yards, 6:00.**
- LAC – Dustin Hopkins 46-yard field goal, 11:28. Tied 3–3. **Drive: 6 plays, 48 yards, 2:44.**
- MIN – Greg Joseph 30-yard field goal, 6:38. Vikings 6–3. **Drive: 11 plays, 50 yards, 4:50.**
- MIN – Tyler Conklin 5-yard pass from Kirk Cousins (Greg Joseph kick), 3:26. Vikings 13–3. **Drive: 6 plays, 31 yards, 3:00.**
- LAC – Larry Rountree III 1-yard run (Dustin Hopkins kick), 1:30. Vikings 13–10. **Drive: 8 plays, 75 yards, 1:56.**

**Third quarter**

- LAC – Austin Ekeler 2-yard pass from Justin Herbert (Dustin Hopkins kick), 10:40. Chargers 17–13. **Drive: 10 plays, 75 yards, 4:20.**
- MIN – Tyler Conklin 1-yard pass from Kirk Cousins (Greg Joseph kick), 2:33. Vikings 20–17. **Drive: 9 plays, 66 yards, 3:52.**

**Fourth quarter**

- MIN – Dalvin Cook 1-yard run (Greg Joseph kick), 9:29. Vikings 27–17. **Drive: 12 plays, 68 yards, 7:04.**
- LAC – Dustin Hopkins 24-yard field goal, 4:36. Vikings 27–20. **Drive: 12 plays, 69 yards, 4:53.**

**Top passers**

- MIN – Kirk Cousins – 25/37, 294 yards, 2 TD
- LAC – Justin Herbert – 20/34, 195 yards, TD, INT

**Top rushers**

- MIN – Dalvin Cook – 24 rushes, 94 yards, TD
- LAC – Austin Ekeler – 11 rushes, 44 yards

**Top receivers**

- MIN – Justin Jefferson – 9 receptions, 143 yards
- LAC – Keenan Allen – 8 receptions, 98 yards

After Justin Jones ended a Vikings threat with a fumble recovery at his own 29, Minnesota managed to take the lead with a field goal on their next drive. Los Angeles tied the score, then made a goal line stand, aided when a holding penalty wiped out a Kirk Cousins touchdown pass. The Vikings settled for a field goal, but were presented with another chance when Herbert was intercepted by Eric Kendricks, and took full advantage with the game's first touchdown. Los Angeles responded, with Allen drawing a 28-yard pass interference penalty up the left sideline and Larry Rountree III scoring his first career touchdown, cutting the halftime deficit to 13–10.

The Chargers took the lead after receiving the second half kickoff, Herbert converting two third downs en route to a touchdown, but Minnesota later scored touchdowns on consecutive possessions to take control. The first of these came on 4th and goal, when Cousins was able to loop a high pass into the end zone under heavy pressure; the second was set up by three third down conversions. After Los Angeles pulled back within seven points, Minnesota reached a 4th and 2 from the Charger 36, with 2:32 to play. They went for the first down, and got it through Dalvin Cook's 4-yard run. The Chargers having used all their timeouts, three quarterback kneels by Cousins were enough to run the clock out.

As had been the case with their previous two defeats, Los Angeles possessed the ball for less than 25 minutes, finishing with 23 minutes and 45 seconds.

==== Week 11: vs. Pittsburgh Steelers ====
Week 11: Pittsburgh Steelers at Los Angeles Chargers – Game summary

| Quarter | 1 | 2 | 3 | 4 | Total |
|---|---|---|---|---|---|
| Steelers | 3 | 7 | 0 | 27 | **37** |
| **Chargers** | 7 | 10 | 10 | 14 | **41** |

at SoFi Stadium, Inglewood, California

- Date: November 21
- Game time: 5:20 p.m. PST
- Game weather: None (retractable roof closed)
- Game attendance: 70,240
- Referee: Carl Cheffers
- TV announcers (NBC): Al Michaels, Cris Collinsworth and Michele Tafoya
- Recap, Game Book

Game information

**First quarter**

- PIT – Chris Boswell 36-yard field goal, 8:29. Steelers 3–0. **Drive: 13 plays, 57 yards, 6:31.**
- LAC – Austin Ekeler 6-yard run (Dustin Hopkins kick), 2:09. Chargers 7–3. **Drive: 12 plays, 73 yards, 6:20.**

**Second quarter**

- LAC – Austin Ekeler 10-yard pass from Justin Herbert (Dustin Hopkins kick), 3:42. Chargers 14–3. **Drive: 12 plays, 98 yards, 6:54.**
- PIT – Diontae Johnson 10-yard pass from Ben Roethlisberger (Chris Boswell kick), 1:09. Chargers 14–10. **Drive: 7 plays, 64 yards, 2:33.**
- LAC – Dustin Hopkins 30-yard field goal, 0:02. Chargers 17–10. **Drive: 8 plays, 63 yards, 1:07.**

**Third quarter**

- LAC – Austin Ekeler 17-yard pass from Justin Herbert (Dustin Hopkins kick), 11:50. Chargers 24–10. **Drive: 6 plays, 70 yards, 3:10.**
- LAC – Dustin Hopkins 41-yard field goal, 3:40. Chargers 27–10. **Drive: 11 plays, 51 yards, 6:28.**

**Fourth quarter**

- PIT – Chris Boswell 36-yard field goal, 14:10. Chargers 27–13. **Drive: 10 plays, 57 yards, 4:30.**
- PIT – Najee Harris 1-yard run (Chris Boswell kick), 11:35. Chargers 27–20. **Drive: 4 plays, 3 yards, 0:58.**
- LAC – Austin Ekeler 5-yard run (Dustin Hopkins kick), 8:48. Chargers 34–20. **Drive: 7 plays, 75 yards, 2:47.**
- PIT – Eric Ebron 5-yard pass from Ben Roethlisberger (Chris Boswell kick), 4:49. Chargers 34–27. **Drive: 9 plays, 75 yards, 3:59.**
- PIT – Pat Freiermuth 5-yard pass from Ben Roethlisberger (Chris Boswell kick), 4:23. Tied 34–34. **Drive: 2 plays, 11 yards, 0:13.**
- PIT – Chris Boswell 45-yard field goal, 3:24. Steelers 37–34. **Drive: 4 plays, 7 yards, 0:19.**
- LAC – Mike Williams 53-yard pass from Justin Herbert (Dustin Hopkins kick), 2:09. Chargers 41–37. **Drive: 3 plays, 75 yards, 1:15.**

**Top passers**

- PIT – Ben Roethlisberger – 28/44, 273 yards, 3 TD
- LAC – Justin Herbert – 30/41, 382 yards, 3 TD, INT

**Top rushers**

- PIT – Najee Harris – 12 rushes, 39 yards, TD
- LAC – Justin Herbert – 9 rushes, 90 yards

**Top receivers**

- PIT – Diontae Johnson – 7 receptions, 101 yards, TD
- LAC – Keenan Allen – 9 receptions, 112 yards

Shortly after the Steelers scored three points on the game's opening drive, Herbert converted a 3rd and 14 with a 22-yard completion to Williams. The Chargers converted two further third downs en route to Ekeler's first touchdown. Pittsburgh appeared poised to respond on their next drive, as they drove from their own 25 to a 1st and goal at the Los Angeles 5. After three plays gained three yards, the Steelers went for the touchdown on 4th and goal from the 2, but Pat Freiermuth was tackled by Derwin James and Joe Gaziano immediately after receiving the ball, for no gain. Los Angeles then drove 98 for another touchdown. Herbert converted the drive's lone third down with the first of a pair of 18-yard scrambles before passing to Ekeler for an 11-point lead. After Pittsburgh answered with a touchdown, the Chargers drove inside the 10 yard line on their final possession of the half, but had to settle for a Hopkins field goal and a 17–10 halftime lead.

Los Angeles faced a 3rd and 13 on the opening drive of the second half, but Herbert found Allen downfield for a 30-yard gain. Three plays later, Ekeler took a short pass in the right flat and side-stepped two defenders on his way to another touchdown. After the Steelers went three-and-out (their only punt of the game), Herbert scrambled for 13 yards on 3rd and 5 to move the Chargers into field goal range. Soon afterwards, he appeared to have brought up a 1st and goal with a 15-yard run, but a holding penalty on Corey Linsley negated the gain, ultimately forcing a field goal try. Hopkins was wide left from 46 yards out, but a Steelers penalty gave him another chance from five yards closer, which he converted. The Chargers led 27–10 through three quarters, having scored on all five of their offensive drives.

Pittsburgh pulled three points back early in the final quarter, then Ty Long's lone punt attempt of the game was blocked to set the Steelers up at the Charger 3. Three plays lost two yards, and Ben Roethlisberger's fourth down pass was then deflected and intercepted by Adderley. However, Campbell was flagged for pass interference, negating the turnover - Pittsburgh scored on the next play. Los Angeles responded by moving to a 3rd and 5 from the Steelers' 47, from where Herbert again scrambled for a long gain, starting along the left sideline before cutting back inside and gaining 36 yards before being caught by Pittsburgh lineman Cameron Heyward. Hayward appeared to punch Herbert after the play, drawing a penalty and moving the ball to the 5, from where Ekeler scored his fourth touchdown on the next play.

Uchenna Nwosu sacked Roethlisberger on the next play from scrimmage, forcing a fumble the Pittsburgh quarterback recovered himself. Roethlisberger then passed on eight consecutive plays, completing seven of them, the last for the touchdown that pulled his team back within seven points with five minutes remaining. Two plays later, Herbert's pass deflected high in the air after striking Heyward's helmet, and Cameron Sutton made a diving interception at the Chargers 11. Two plays later, Roethlisberger threw his second touchdown pass in 26 seconds to tie the score. Los Angeles soon reached a 4th and 1 at their own 34. They opted to go for it, but Ekeler was stuffed for no gain, setting up a Pittsburgh field goal - the Steelers had scored 17 points in 85 seconds, and led 37–34. Herbert, however, responded with the game-winning touchdown three plays later, finding Williams wide open along the left sideline for a 53-yard touchdown with barely two minutes to play. Fackrell and Bosa produced back-to-back sacks on the first two plays of the Steelers' response, and two incompletions then caused a turnover on downs.

Herbert's figures of 9 rushes for 90 yards included three kneel-downs for minus three yards to end the game. His rushing total was the highest in NFL history was a quarterback who passed for at least 350 yards. Ekeler was the eleventh Charger to score four touchdowns in a game, and the first since Danny Woodhead in 2015. He was also the 13th NFL player to score multiple rushing and receiving touchdowns in a game. The Chargers won despite conceding their most 4th quarter points in a game since 1963.

==== Week 12: at Denver Broncos ====
Week 12: Los Angeles Chargers at Denver Broncos – Game summary

| Quarter | 1 | 2 | 3 | 4 | Total |
|---|---|---|---|---|---|
| Chargers | 0 | 7 | 0 | 6 | **13** |
| **Broncos** | 7 | 7 | 0 | 14 | **28** |

at Empower Field at Mile High, Denver, Colorado

- Date: November 28
- Game time: 2:05 p.m. MST/1:05 p.m. PST
- Game weather: Partly cloudy, 66 °F (19 °C)
- Game attendance: 75,807
- Referee: Land Clark
- TV announcers (CBS): Greg Gumbel, Adam Archuleta and AJ Ross
- Recap, Game Book

Game information

**First quarter**

- DEN – Teddy Bridgewater 11-yard run (Brandon McManus kick), 4:31. Broncos 7–0. **Drive: 8 plays, 50 yards, 4:24.**

**Second quarter**

- DEN – Javonte Williams 9-yard run (Brandon McManus kick), 12:46. Broncos 14–0. **Drive: 11 plays, 75 yards, 5:46.**
- LAC – Austin Ekeler 12-yard pass from Justin Herbert (Dustin Hopkins kick), 0:31. Broncos 14–7. **Drive: 6 plays, 47 yards, 0:45.**

**Third quarter**

- No scoring plays.

**Fourth quarter**

- DEN – Eric Saubert 1-yard pass from Teddy Bridgewater (Brandon McManus kick), 8:54. Broncos 21–7. **Drive: 10 plays, 80 yards, 5:36.**
- DEN – Patrick Surtain II 70-yard interception return (Brandon McManus kick), 7:28. Broncos 28–7.
- LAC – Jared Cook 16-yard pass from Justin Herbert (pass failed), 4:34. Broncos 28–13. **Drive: 9 plays, 75 yards, 2:54.**

**Top passers**

- LAC – Justin Herbert – 28/44, 303 yards, 2 TD, 2 INT
- DEN – Teddy Bridgewater – 11/18, 129 yards, TD

**Top rushers**

- LAC – Justin Herbert – 4 rushes, 36 yards
- DEN – Melvin Gordon – 17 rushes, 83 yards

**Top receivers**

- LAC – Keenan Allen – 7 receptions, 85 yards
- DEN – Javonte Williams – 3 receptions, 57 yards

The Chargers travelled to Denver, Colorado in what was head coach Brandon Staley's return to Denver, two years after leaving. Staley served as outside linebackers coach of the Broncos under head coach Vic Fangio during the 2019 season.

Denver were forced to punt on their first possession, but successfully downed the ball at the Chargers 1 yard line. After Los Angeles went three-and-out, the Broncos had to drive only 50 yards to take the lead. After the Chargers again went three-and-out, James appeared to have created a turnover by forcing a Teddy Bridgewater fumble, but the play was ruled an incomplete pass upon review. Bridgewater was knocked out of the game until the 3rd quarter, and his replacement, Drew Lock, fumbled on his second play while being sacked by Bosa. The ball went forwards, and was recovered by Denver to convert a 3rd and 3. The Broncos eventually scored on the drive, going ahead 14–0; at this point, Denver had a 12–0 advantage in first downs gained. The Chargers did manage to move the ball on their next possession, but the drive ended when Herbert's pass was broken up on 4th and 3 from the Denver 35. Late in the half, James intercepted a Lock pass and returned it 5 yards to the Denver 47. Allen had back-to-back catches of 18 and 14 yards on the ensuing drive, which ended with Ekeler taking a short pass over the middle and scoring to cut the halftime deficit to 14–7.

Los Angeles held the ball for all but 75 seconds of the 3rd quarter, but failed to convert that advantage into any points. Firstly, a seven-minute drive ended with Herbert being sacked on 3rd and 6 from the Denver 27, and Hopkins missing a 52-yard field goal. After quickly forcing a Denver punt, they reached a 4th and 4 at the Bronco 34, which they converted with Jalen Guyton's 15-yard catch and run. On the first play of the final quarter, Ekeler's 12-yard catch on 3rd and 9 was negated when Linsley was ruled an ineligible receiver downfield; on 3rd and 14, Herbert's end zone pass was intercepted by Patrick Surtain II. The Broncos then converted three third downs before doubling their lead with nine minutes to play. The Chargers reached a 1st and 10 at the Denver 37, from where Ekeler tipped a pass thrown slightly behind him – Surtain intercepted the deflected ball, and returned it 70 yards for the clinching touchdown.

==== Week 13: at Cincinnati Bengals ====
Week 13: Los Angeles Chargers at Cincinnati Bengals – Game summary

| Quarter | 1 | 2 | 3 | 4 | Total |
|---|---|---|---|---|---|
| **Chargers** | 16 | 8 | 0 | 17 | **41** |
| Bengals | 0 | 13 | 9 | 0 | **22** |

at Paul Brown Stadium, Cincinnati, Ohio

- Date: December 5
- Game time: 1:00 p.m. EST/10:00 a.m. PST
- Game weather: Cloudy, 51 °F (11 °C)
- Game attendance: 51,414
- Referee: Shawn Hochuli
- TV announcers (CBS): Ian Eagle, Charles Davis and Evan Washburn
- Recap, Game Book

Game information

**First quarter**

- LAC – Keenan Allen 4-yard pass from Justin Herbert (kick failed), 11:31. Chargers 6–0. **Drive: 9 plays, 55 yards, 3:29.**
- LAC – Dustin Hopkins 43-yard field goal, 6:28. Chargers 9–0. **Drive: 4 plays, 4 yards, 2:19.**
- LAC – Keenan Allen 7-yard pass from Justin Herbert (Dustin Hopkins kick), 1:34. Chargers 16–0. **Drive: 5 plays, 73 yards, 2:55.**

**Second quarter**

- LAC – Jalen Guyton 44-yard pass from Justin Herbert (Keenan Allen–Justin Herbert pass), 10:12. Chargers 24–0. **Drive: 3 plays, 58 yards, 1:25.**
- CIN – Tee Higgins 29-yard pass from Joe Burrow (kick failed), 7:39. Chargers 24–6. **Drive: 6 plays, 75 yards, 2:33.**
- CIN – Joe Burrow 6-yard run (Evan McPherson kick), 2:40. Chargers 24–13. **Drive: 3 plays, 19 yards, 1:29.**

**Third quarter**

- CIN – Evan McPherson 48-yard field goal, 9:53. Chargers 24–16. **Drive: 10 plays, 45 yards, 5:07.**
- CIN – Joe Mixon 7-yard run (run failed), 7:10. Chargers 24–22. **Drive: 5 plays, 32 yards, 1:50.**

**Fourth quarter**

- LAC – Tevaughn Campbell 61-yard fumble return (Dustin Hopkins kick), 13:43. Chargers 31–22.
- LAC – Austin Ekeler 1-yard run (Dustin Hopkins kick), 10:49. Chargers 38–22. **Drive: 4 plays, 53 yards, 2:03.**
- LAC – Dustin Hopkins 43-yard field goal, 1:10. Chargers 41–22. **Drive: 7 plays, 15 yards, 3:49.**

**Top passers**

- LAC – Justin Herbert – 26/35, 317 yards, 3 TD, INT
- CIN – Joe Burrow – 24/40, 300 yards, TD, 2 INT

**Top rushers**

- LAC – Austin Ekeler – 14 rushes, 59 yards, TD
- CIN – Joe Mixon – 19 rushes, 54 yards, TD

**Top receivers**

- LAC – Mike Williams – 5 receptions, 110 yards
- CIN – Tee Higgins – 9 receptions, 138 yards, TD

Andre Roberts gave the Chargers a good start when he returned the opening kickoff 48 yards to his own 45. Herbert then converted a 3rd and 9 with a 10-yard pass to Allen, and found Williams for 41 yards two plays later, bringing up a first and goal at the 4. After three plays netted no yards, the Chargers went for the touchdown on fourth down – Herbert connected with Allen in the front of the end zone, putting Los Angeles ahead to stay. Five plays later, Nwosu knocked the ball from Joe Burrow's grasp, making the recovery himself at the Bengal 29 and setting up a Hopkins field goal. On the next Bengals possession, Michael Davis appeared to have been beaten along the right sideline by Ja'Marr Chase, but Chase bobbled the potential touchdown catch, allowing Davis to catch up and make a one-handed interception. On the next play, Herbert found Williams 47 yards downfield for another long catch; Allen's second touchdown catch came four plays later. Five minutes into the 2nd quarter, Los Angeles scored again, Guyton beating Jessie Bates to a ball in the end zone for a 44-yard touchdown. The Chargers then used a version of the Philly Special on a two-point conversion try, Allen passing to Herbert for a 24–0 lead.

Cincinnati began their comeback with a touchdown on the next drive. In their response, the Chargers reached a 3rd and 8 from the Bengal 43. Ekeler then fumbled at the end of a 7-yard catch-and-run, with Bates recovering and returning the ball 46 yards before Herbert made a touchdown-saving tackle. The Bengals drove 19 yards for their second touchdown of the game. Los Angeles again crossed midfield on their next possession, but Herbert was sacked on consecutive plays, bringing up a 3rd and 25 at the Los Angeles 36. Herbert attempted a deep pass, which Palmer came close to catching before Bengal's cornerback Chidobe Awuzie knocked the ball loose and intercepted it at his own 12. The score remained 24–13 at halftime.

The Bengals continued to draw closer in the 3rd quarter, receiving the second half kickoff and adding a field goal. Ekeler lost another fumble soon afterwards, this time at his own 32, and Joe Mixon scored five plays later. The Bengals tried to tie the game with a two-point conversion, but a group of Chargers stopped Mixon a yard short of the end zone, preserving the lead at 24–22. Early in the final quarter, Cincinnati reached a 2nd and 2 from the 34 of Los Angeles. Christian Covington then knocked the ball from Mixon's grasp - it ran into the path of Campbell, who recovered and had a clear run to the end zone for the Chargers' lone defensive touchdown of the season. Drue Tranquill's third down sack of Burrow forced a Bengals punt, and Guyton's 33-yard catch soon brought Los Angeles to the 1. Ekeler scored a play later. The best Bengals chance after that ended with eight minute to play when Chris Harris intercepted Burrow in the end zone.

This was the first meeting of the quarterbacks selected first and sixth in the 2020 NFL draft. Both passed for 300 yards or more, and both sustained a personal high number of sacks for the 2021 regular season (six on Burrow, four on Herbert). By preventing the Bengals from completing their comeback, the Chargers avoided tying a club record for biggest blown lead. They had previously lost 24–0 leads in 1982 and 2012. This also made the Chargers the only AFC West team to beat Cincinnati in the 2021 Season.

==== Week 14: vs. New York Giants ====
Week 14: New York Giants at Los Angeles Chargers – Game summary

| Quarter | 1 | 2 | 3 | 4 | Total |
|---|---|---|---|---|---|
| Giants | 7 | 0 | 0 | 14 | **21** |
| **Chargers** | 7 | 17 | 6 | 7 | **37** |

at SoFi Stadium, Inglewood, California

- Date: December 12
- Game time: 1:05 p.m. PST
- Game weather: None (retractable roof closed)
- Game attendance: 70,240
- Referee: Tony Corrente
- TV announcers (Fox): Adam Amin, Mark Schlereth and Shannon Spake
- Recap, Game Book

Game information

**First quarter**

- LAC – Austin Ekeler 4-yard run (Dustin Hopkins kick), 4:44. Chargers 7–0. **Drive: 9 plays, 60 yards, 4:33.**
- NYG – Elijhaa Penny 3-yard pass from Mike Glennon (Graham Gano kick), 1:29. Tied 7–7. **Drive: 7 plays, 75 yards, 3:15.**

**Second quarter**

- LAC – Josh Palmer 12-yard pass from Justin Herbert (Dustin Hopkins kick), 12:07. Chargers 14–7. **Drive: 9 plays, 60 yards, 4:22.**
- LAC – Dustin Hopkins 27-yard field goal, 4:15. Chargers 17–7. **Drive: 12 plays, 69 yards, 6:25.**
- LAC – Jalen Guyton 45-yard pass from Justin Herbert (Dustin Hopkins kick), 0:17. Chargers 24–7. **Drive: 4 plays, 75 yards, 0:23.**

**Third quarter**

- LAC – Dustin Hopkins 28-yard field goal, 9:36. Chargers 27–7. **Drive: 10 plays, 67 yards, 5:24.**
- LAC – Dustin Hopkins 39-yard field goal, 5:05. Chargers 30–7. **Drive: 6 plays, 17 yards, 2:56.**

**Fourth quarter**

- LAC – Jared Cook 1-yard pass from Justin Herbert (Dustin Hopkins kick), 9:28. Chargers 37–7. **Drive: 11 plays, 41 yards, 5:55.**
- NYG – Saquon Barkley 18-yard pass from Mike Glennon (pass failed), 4:33. Chargers 37–13. **Drive: 10 plays, 75 yards, 4:55.**
- NYG – Mike Glennon 7-yard run (Elijhaa Penny run), 1:18. Chargers 37–21. **Drive: 7 plays, 63 yards, 2:11.**

**Top passers**

- NYG – Mike Glennon – 17/36, 191 yards, 2 TD, INT
- LAC – Justin Herbert – 23/31, 275 yards, 3 TD

**Top rushers**

- NYG – Saquon Barkley – 16 rushes, 64 yards
- LAC – Austin Ekeler – 12 rushes, 67 yards, TD

**Top receivers**

- NYG – Kyle Rudolph – 2 receptions, 66 yards
- LAC – Jalen Guyton – 3 receptions, 87 yards, TD

Los Angeles punted on their first possession, but didn't face a third down the next time they had the ball, and drove for Ekeler's opening touchdown. New York tied the score two plays after tight end Kyle Rudolph got open for a 60-yard catch-and-run, but the Chargers soon regained the lead via Josh Palmer's 10-yard touchdown catch on 3rd and 8. Palmer saw increased playing time after Allen was ruled out due to a positive test for COVID-19. The Chargers reached a 4th and 1 at the New York 5 on their next drive. They went for the first down, and Herbert appeared to have been stopped short on a quarterback sneak. However, a pre-snap false start penalty on Chargers' guard Matt Feiler negated the play, enabling Hopkins to kick a field goal and increase the lead to ten points.

Late in the half, the defense forced a punt which went only 18 yards to the Charger 25. Working with 40 seconds and two timeouts, Los Angeles reached a 3rd and 11 at their own 41. From there, Herbert rolled right under pressure before throwing a pass that travelled over 63 yards through the air and was caught by Guyton as he crossed the New York goal line. It was the longest completion in the NFL by air yards up to that point in the season.

Up 24–7 at the break, the Chargers scored on their first three possessions of the second half and extended their lead to 30 points with under ten minutes to play. Overall, they had scored four touchdowns and three field goals over a span of eight possessions. New York, who had produced no drives of over 20 yards in either the 2nd or 3rd quarters, were then able to generate two touchdown drives. After the second of these, Parham mishandled an onside kick attempt and the Giants recovered, preserving a small chance of a comeback. New York drove to the Charger 26 before rookie linebacker Nick Niemann sealed the win with his first career interception.

==== Week 15: vs. Kansas City Chiefs ====
Week 15: Kansas City Chiefs at Los Angeles Chargers – Game summary

| Quarter | 1 | 2 | 3 | 4 | OT | Total |
|---|---|---|---|---|---|---|
| **Chiefs** | 7 | 3 | 3 | 15 | 6 | **34** |
| Chargers | 0 | 14 | 0 | 14 | 0 | **28** |

at SoFi Stadium, Inglewood, California

- Date: December 16
- Game time: 5:20 p.m. PST
- Game weather: None (retractable roof closed)
- Game attendance: 70,240
- Referee: Shawn Smith
- TV announcers (Fox/NFLN/Prime Video): Joe Buck, Troy Aikman, Erin Andrews and Kristina Pink
- Recap, Game Book

Game information

**First quarter**

- KC – Michael Burton 7-yard run (Harrison Butker kick), 7:34. Chiefs 7–0. **11 plays, 95 yards, 5:53**

**Second quarter**

- KC – Harrison Butker 30-yard field goal, 14:48. Chiefs 10–0. **Drive: 10 plays, 46 yards, 5:30.**
- LAC – Justin Herbert 1-yard run (Dustin Hopkins kick), 9:12. Chiefs 10–7. **Drive: 10 plays, 75 yards, 5:36.**
- LAC – Jalen Guyton 4-yard pass from Justin Herbert (Dustin Hopkins kick), 3:15. Chargers 14–10. **Drive: 9 plays, 42 yards, 4:56.**

**Third quarter**

- KC – Harrison Butker 33-yard field goal, 12:12. Chargers 14–13. **Drive: 7 plays, 61 yards, 2:48.**

**Fourth quarter**

- LAC – Austin Ekeler 2-yard run (Dustin Hopkins kick), 9:29. Chargers 21–13. **Drive: 1 play, 2 yards, 0:05.**
- KC – Tyreek Hill 1-yard pass from Patrick Mahomes (Patrick Mahomes–Clyde Edwards-Helaire pass), 7:44. Tied 21–21. **Drive: 5 plays, 75 yards, 1:45.**
- LAC – Keenan Allen 8-yard pass from Justin Herbert (Dustin Hopkins kick), 2:19. Chargers 28–21. **Drive: 11 plays, 75 yards, 5:25.**
- KC – Travis Kelce 7-yard pass from Patrick Mahomes (Harrison Butker kick), 1:16. Tied 28–28. **Drive: 8 plays, 75 yards, 1:03.**

**Overtime**

- KC – Travis Kelce 34-yard pass from Patrick Mahomes, 8:45. Chiefs 34–28. **Drive: 5 plays, 75 yards, 1:15.**

**Top passers**

- KC – Patrick Mahomes – 31/47, 410 yards, 3 TD, INT
- LAC – Justin Herbert – 22/38, 236 yards, 2 TD, INT

**Top rushers**

- KC – Patrick Mahomes – 3 rushes, 32 yards
- LAC – Justin Jackson – 13 rushes, 86 yards

**Top receivers**

- KC – Travis Kelce – 10 receptions, 191 yards, 2 TD
- LAC – Keenan Allen – 6 receptions, 78 yards, TD

First place in the AFC West was at stake in this game, as the 8–5 Chargers could overtake the 9–4 Chiefs on tiebreakers with a win. Andre Roberts returned the opening kickoff 75 yards - he had a chance to score, but slipped and was tackled at the Kansas City 24. From there, Los Angeles moved to the 5 yard line, but Herbert threw four incompletions to turn the ball over on downs. Parham almost made a diving catch for the last of these, but lost the ball as he struck the ground; he suffered a serious head injury from the impact, and was taken to Harbor–UCLA Medical Center, where his condition was later announced as stable.

When the game resumed, Mahomes completed six passes out of seven while leading a 95-yard touchdown drive. A Herbert pass was tipped and intercepted on the next drive, and Kansas City drove to a 3rd and 7 the Los Angeles 11, before Mahomes threw incomplete under pressure from Nwosu, and Butker added three points with a field goal. The Chargers scored on their next two drives to take the lead, either side of a Kansas City three-and-out. On the first of these drives, Herbert converted a 3rd and 2 with a 15-yard pass to Allen, and scored himself two plays later; on the second, he converted a 4th and 1 with a 2-yard sneak, and finished the drive with a touchdown pass to Guyton. On the first play after the two-minute warning, Bosa contacted Mahomes' throwing arm, causing a fumble that Tranquill recovered at the Kansas City 45. A 27-yard catch by Williams helped the Chargers reach 4th and goal at the 1 with 3 seconds remaining in the half. They opted to go for the touchdown, but Herbert's pass was knocked down by Daniel Sorensen, and the score remained at 14–10.

After a Kansas City field goal reduced their deficit to a single point, Herbert threw incomplete on 4th down for a third time, this time giving the Chiefs the ball at their own 28. Kansas City drove to a 4th and inches from the Charger 1 yard line; they too went for the touchdown, but Mahomes threw well short of an open receiver. Los Angeles then produced a 97-yard drive: Justin Jackson had a 22-yard run and Allen a 29-yard reception, and Joshua Kelley converted a 4th and 1 with a 7-yard carry. However, Kelley fumbled on 3rd and goal from the 1, and the Chiefs recovered at their own 2 yard line.

Los Angeles soon got another chance, as Nwosu tipped a Mahomes pass in the air and made the interception himself at the 2. Ekeler scored on the next play, beginning a sequence of four consecutive touchdown drives. Travis Kelce was open for a 69-yard catch-and-run to the Charger 1 - the Chiefs scored two plays later, and tied the score with a two-point conversion. Allen's 8-yard touchdown on 3rd and 6 restored the lead with 2:19 to play, but Mahomes ran for 33 yards and passed for 42 as the Chiefs took barely a minute to tie the score again. Los Angeles reached their own 44-yard line, but punted for the only time in the game after three Herbert incompletions. The game went to overtime, where Kansas City won the coin toss and needed only five plays to win. Kelce had receptions of 27 and 34 yards, the latter for the winning touchdown.

With 410 yards, Mahomes was the first opponent to pass for 400+ yards against the Chargers since Michael Vick for the Eagles, eight years previously; Kelce's 191 receiving yards were the most since DeSean Jackson had 193 in the same game. Los Angeles did manage a season-high 192 rushing yards.

==== Week 16: at Houston Texans ====
Week 16: Los Angeles Chargers at Houston Texans – Game summary

| Quarter | 1 | 2 | 3 | 4 | Total |
|---|---|---|---|---|---|
| Chargers | 6 | 6 | 3 | 14 | **29** |
| **Texans** | 7 | 10 | 0 | 24 | **41** |

at NRG Stadium, Houston, Texas

- Date: December 26
- Game time: 12:00 p.m. CST/10:00 a.m. PST
- Game weather: None (retractable roof closed)
- Game attendance: 65,674
- Referee: Clay Martin
- TV announcers (CBS): Andrew Catalon, James Lofton and Sherree Burruss
- Recap, Game Book

Game information

**First quarter**

- LAC – Dustin Hopkins 50-yard field goal, 10:55. Chargers 3–0. **Drive: 8 plays, 43 yards, 4:05.**
- HOU – Rex Burkhead 25-yard run (Dominik Eberle kick), 6:25. Texans 7–3. **Drive: 8 plays, 75 yards, 4:30.**
- LAC – Dustin Hopkins 46-yard field goal, 1:57. Texans 7–6. **Drive: 9 plays, 54 yards, 4:28.**

**Second quarter**

- LAC – Justin Jackson 17-yard run (run failed), 11:15. Chargers 12–7. **Drive: 7 plays, 70 yards, 3:38.**
- HOU – Dominik Eberle 51-yard field goal, 5:11. Chargers 12–10. **Drive: 12 plays, 42 yards, 6:04.**
- HOU – Chris Conley 41-yard pass from Davis Mills (Dominik Eberle kick), 0:27. Texans 17–12. **Drive: 7 plays, 94 yards, 3:30.**

**Third quarter**

- LAC – Dustin Hopkins 35-yard field goal, 5:42. Texans 17–15. **Drive: 11 plays, 41 yards, 5:25.**

**Fourth quarter**

- HOU – Rex Burkhead 1-yard run (Dominik Eberle kick), 13:37. Texans 24–15. **Drive: 13 plays, 75 yards, 7:05.**
- HOU – Dominik Eberle 25-yard field goal, 8:54. Texans 27–15. **Drive: 8 plays, 40 yards, 3:54.**
- LAC – Justin Jackson 9-yard run (Justin Herbert–Jared Cook pass), 5:50. Texans 27–23. **Drive: 9 plays, 75 yards, 3:04.**
- HOU – Nico Collins 13-yard pass from Davis Mills (Dominik Eberle kick), 2:32. Texans 34–23. **Drive: 7 plays, 72 yards, 3:18.**
- HOU – Tavierre Thomas 48-yard interception return (Dominik Eberle kick), 1:49. Texans 41–23.
- LAC – Joshua Palmer 3-yard pass from Justin Herbert (pass failed), 0:34. Texans 41–29. **Drive: 6 plays, 75 yards, 1:15.**

**Top passers**

- LAC – Justin Herbert – 27/35, 336 yards, TD, 2 INT
- HOU – Davis Mills – 21/27, 254 yards, 2 TD

**Top rushers**

- LAC – Justin Jackson – 11 rushes, 64 yards, 2 TD
- HOU – Rex Burkhead – 22 rushes, 149 yards, 2 TD

**Top receivers**

- LAC – Justin Jackson – 8 receptions, 98 yards
- HOU – Chris Conley – 3 receptions, 60 yards, TD

Los Angeles were hit by an outbreak of COVID-19 in the leadup to the game, with Pro Bowlers Bosa, Linsley and Ekeler among numerous potential starters ruled out. With the Texans also forced to put a large number of players of the COVID reserve list, there was some question of the game being postponed, but it was played on December 26 as originally scheduled.

The Chargers scored on their first three drives to lead 12–7 early in the 2nd quarter. After Houston pulled three points back with a field goal, Los Angeles moved to a 1st and 10 at the Texan 39, from where Herbert's long pass was intercepted at the goal line. Houston faced a 2nd and 14 at their own 2 shortly afterwards, but a holding penalty on Linval Joseph gave them a first down. Rookie quarterback Davis Mills had completions of 36 and 41 yards in the next five plays, the latter for the touchdown that put Houston ahead to stay.

The Chargers possessed the ball for barely eleven minutes in the second half. Houston responded to Hopkins' third field goal with a 7-minute touchdown drive, and Justin Jackson lost a fumble only two plays later, leading to a Texans field goal and 27–15 scoreline. On the next drive, Jackson caught three passes for 37 yards, and rushed twice for 16 yards and a touchdown, but Houston then put the game away with Mills' second touchdown pass.

Los Angeles attempted no punts for the tenth time in their history, and the third time in 2021, after the earlier games with Dallas and Philadelphia. Jackson, who saw increased playing time in Ekeler's absence, gained 162 yards from scrimmage while leading the team in both rushing and receiving; he also scored two touchdowns, his first for three years. The defeat left Los Angeles needing other results to go in their favour to make the playoffs, even if they won their final two games.

This was the first time the Chargers ever lost in Houston, being 3-0 heading into this game.

==== Week 17: vs. Denver Broncos ====
Week 17: Denver Broncos at Los Angeles Chargers – Game summary

| Quarter | 1 | 2 | 3 | 4 | Total |
|---|---|---|---|---|---|
| Broncos | 0 | 3 | 0 | 10 | **13** |
| **Chargers** | 7 | 10 | 3 | 14 | **34** |

at SoFi Stadium, Inglewood, California

- Date: January 2
- Game time: 1:05 p.m. PST
- Game weather: None (retractable roof closed)
- Game attendance: 70,240
- Referee: Craig Wrolstad
- TV announcers (CBS): Ian Eagle, Charles Davis and Evan Washburn
- Recap, Game Book

Game information

**First quarter**

- LAC – Austin Ekeler 3-yard run (Dustin Hopkins kick), 11:49. Chargers 7–0. **Drive: 7 plays, 55 yards, 3:11.**

**Second quarter**

- LAC – Dustin Hopkins 19-yard field goal, 11:27. Chargers 10–0. **Drive: 14 plays, 69 yards, 6:45.**
- LAC – Keenan Allen 8-yard pass from Justin Herbert (Dustin Hopkins kick), 0:14. Chargers 17–0. **Drive: 11 plays, 49 yards, 3:00.**
- DEN – Brandon McManus 61-yard field goal, 0:00. Chargers 17–3. **Drive: 3 plays, 32 yards, 0:14.**

**Third quarter**

- LAC – Dustin Hopkins 23-yard field goal, 7:09. Chargers 20–3. **Drive: 14 plays, 78 yards, 5:41.**

**Fourth quarter**

- DEN – Brandon McManus 23-yard field goal, 14:53. Chargers 20–6. **Drive: 12 plays, 70 yards, 7:16.**
- LAC – Andre Roberts 101-yard kickoff return (Dustin Hopkins kick), 14:40. Chargers 27–6. **Drive: 0 plays, 0 yards, 0:13.**
- LAC – Mike Williams 45-yard pass from Justin Herbert (Dustin Hopkins kick), 10:18. Chargers 34–6. **Drive: 3 plays, 52 yards, 1:04.**
- DEN – Noah Fant 5-yard pass from Drew Lock (Brandon McManus kick), 6:31. Chargers 34–13. **Drive: 6 plays, 75 yards, 3:47.**

**Top passers**

- DEN – Drew Lock – 18/25, 245 yards, TD
- LAC – Justin Herbert – 22/31, 237 yards, 2 TD

**Top rushers**

- DEN – Melvin Gordon – 10 rushes, 43 yards
- LAC – Austin Ekeler – 17 rushes, 58 yards, TD

**Top receivers**

- DEN – Noah Fant – 6 receptions, 92 yards, TD
- LAC – Mike Williams – 3 receptions, 63 yards, TD

The Chargers' playoff chances were boosted when both Miami and Baltimore lost earlier in the day - those results left Los Angeles again able to clinch a wildcard by winning out. Andre Roberts returned the opening kickoff 47 yards, setting up a touchdown for Ekeler - one of several Chargers returning from the COVID reserve list. Denver responded by crossing midfield, but Jerry Tillery sacked Drew Lock on 4th down to end the threat. After Hopkins extended the lead with a short-range field goal, Lock's 44-yard completion helped the Broncos reach a 1st and goal at the Charger 2. The next three plays netted no yardage, and Adderley caused enough disruption to a 4th-down Philly Special pass that Lock, after receiving the ball, was brought down by Bosa and Chris Harris a yard from the goal line. Los Angeles went three-and-out, but Kemon Hall then recovered a muffed punt, Herbert found Ekeler to convert a 4th down, and Allen scored with only 14 seconds left in the half. That was still enough time for Denver to get on the board with a 61-yard field goal by Brandon McManus, setting a record for the longest successful attempt against the Chargers and reducing the lead to 17–3.

Ekeler took a short pass 40 yards on a 3rd and 7 early in the 3rd quarter, eventually leading to another short field goal. Denver responded by driving to a 4th and goal at the 1 as the quarter ended. A Broncos touchdown was then nullified by an illegal formation penalty, forcing them to settle for a field goal. Roberts took the ensuing kickoff a yard deep in his end zone, started out to the right, then cut left and broke away for the first kickoff return touchdown by a Charger since Micheal Spurlock in 2012. The Broncos soon failed on another 4th down conversion attempt, and Herbert found a diving Williams deep downfield to make sure of the win. With this win, the Los Angeles Chargers officially eliminated the Denver Broncos, Miami Dolphins & Cleveland Browns from playoff contention.

==== Week 18: at Las Vegas Raiders ====
Week 18: Los Angeles Chargers at Las Vegas Raiders – Game summary

| Quarter | 1 | 2 | 3 | 4 | OT | Total |
|---|---|---|---|---|---|---|
| Chargers | 0 | 14 | 0 | 15 | 3 | **32** |
| **Raiders** | 10 | 7 | 3 | 9 | 6 | **35** |

at Allegiant Stadium, Paradise, Nevada

- Date: January 9
- Game time: 5:20 p.m. PST
- Game weather: None (indoor stadium)
- Game attendance: 62,068
- Referee: Clete Blakeman
- TV announcers (NBC): Al Michaels, Cris Collinsworth and Michele Tafoya
- Recap, Game Book

Game information

**First quarter**

- LV – Daniel Carlson 24-yard field goal, 10:50. Raiders 3–0. **Drive: 9 plays, 61 yards, 4:10.**
- LV – Hunter Renfrow 12-yard pass from Derek Carr (Daniel Carlson kick), 3:14. Raiders 10–0. **Drive: 6 plays, 23 yards, 3:30.**

**Second quarter**

- LAC – Austin Ekeler 14-yard run (Dustin Hopkins kick), 12:42. Raiders 10–7. **Drive: 14 plays, 75 yards, 5:32.**
- LAC – Austin Ekeler 14-yard pass from Justin Herbert (Dustin Hopkins kick), 1:52. Chargers 14–10. **Drive: 13 plays, 90 yards, 7:02.**
- LV – Josh Jacobs 1-yard run (Daniel Carlson kick), 0:37. Raiders 17–14. **Drive: 7 plays, 75 yards, 1:15.**

**Third quarter**

- LV – Daniel Carlson 31-yard field goal, 8:03. Raiders 20–14. **Drive: 4 plays, 4 yards, 0:49.**

**Fourth quarter**

- LV – Hunter Renfrow 2-yard pass from Derek Carr (pass failed), 14:14. Raiders 26–14. **Drive: 13 plays, 83 yards, 7:17.**
- LV – Daniel Carlson 52-yard field goal, 8:23. Raiders 29–14. **Drive: 8 plays, 30 yards, 4:32.**
- LAC – Josh Palmer 23-yard pass from Justin Herbert (Austin Ekeler–Justin Herbert pass), 4:28. Raiders 29–22. **Drive: 14 plays, 75 yards, 3:55.**
- LAC – Mike Williams 12-yard pass from Justin Herbert (Dustin Hopkins kick), 0:00. Tied 29–29. **Drive: 19 plays, 83 yards, 2:06.**

**Overtime**

- LV – Daniel Carlson 40-yard field goal, 7:09. Raiders 32–29. **Drive: 7 plays, 53 yards, 2:51.**
- LAC – Dustin Hopkins 41-yard field goal, 4:30. Tied 32–32. **Drive: 8 plays, 52 yards, 2:39.**
- LV – Daniel Carlson 47-yard field goal, 0:00. Raiders 35–32. **Drive: 8 plays, 46 yards, 4:30.**

**Top passers**

- LAC – Justin Herbert – 34/64, 383 yards, 3 TD, INT
- LV – Derek Carr – 20/36, 186 yards, 2 TD

**Top rushers**

- LAC – Austin Ekeler – 16 rushes, 64 yards, TD
- LV – Josh Jacobs – 26 rushes, 132 yards, TD

**Top receivers**

- LAC – Mike Williams – 9 receptions, 119 yards, TD
- LV – Bryan Edwards – 4 receptions, 63 yards

As this game carried playoff implications for both teams, the NFL announced that it would be flexed to Sunday night as the regular-season finale. By the time it kicked off, both teams knew they would qualify with a win and be eliminated with a loss. Because the 9-7 Indianapolis Colts shockingly lost to the 2-14 Jacksonville Jaguars and the 8-7-1 Pittsburgh Steelers defeated the 8-8 Baltimore Ravens earlier in the day, a tie would send both the Chargers and Raiders to the playoffs at the expense of Pittsburgh.

Las Vegas already led 3–0 before Roberts fumbled the ball during a punt return, with the Raiders recovering at the Charger 23. Derek Carr converted a 4th and 2 with one completion, and found Hunter Renfrow in the end zone with another, running the lead to ten points. On their answering drive, the Chargers converted a 3rd and 5 when the ball deflected from Williams' hands on to Ekeler, who made the catch and gained 14 yards. Herbert later converted a 4th and 2 with a 5-yard pass to Guyton, and Ekeler scored his first touchdown on the next play, breaking a tackle at the 10 yard line. On the following Charger drive, Herbert and Guyton combined for 6 yards on a 3rd and 2. That drive ended on the first play after the two minute warning, when Ekeler took a short pass and wove through defenders for the go-ahead touchdown. The Chargers looked likely to take their lead into halftime when Carr was penalised 13 yards for intentional grounding, bringing up 3rd and 23 from the Raiders' 35. However, Jalen Richard picked up all 23 yards on a run up the middle. Two plays later, Harris was penalised 41 yards for pass interference in the end zone - the Chargers argued unsuccessfully that the ball was uncatchable - and Las Vegas scored from the 1 to lead 17–14 at the break.

Cook's 42-yard catch on the second play of the 3rd quarter had the Chargers at the Raiders' 22, but a sack pushed them backwards and Hopkins was wide left on a 51-yard field goal. Los Angeles reached 4th and 1 at the own 18 on their next possession; Staley opted to go for it, but Ekeler was stopped for a loss of 2 yards, setting up a Raiders field goal. Las Vegas continued to extend the lead on their next two possessions, following a long touchdown drive with an interception by former Charger Casey Hayward that set up a field goal midway through the final quarter. Trailing 29–14, Herbert moved the Chargers to a 4th and 6 at the Raiders' 18. Williams then caught a Herbert pass on his knees at the 13, and leaned over the first down marker just before he was touched by a defender; he was initially ruled short, but Staley challenged the call and had it overturned by replay review. An 11-yard sack of Herbert soon brought up another 4th down, this time 4th and 21 from the 23. Palmer got in front of the Raiders coverage in the middle of the end zone and caught Herbert's pass for a touchdown; Ekeler's two-point conversion catch pulled the Chargers within seven points, with four and a half minutes remaining. Las Vegas then went three-and-out; Bosa forced a Carr fumble on 3rd down, which the Raiders were able to recover at their own 19. Following a punt, Los Angeles took over at their own 17 yard line with 2:06 to play and all three timeouts remaining.

Herbert began the drive with three incompletions, then Allen made a catch at his own 22, turned upfield and dove between two defenders, reaching the 28 and picking up a first down. After a further three incompletions, Cook drew a defensive holding penalty as Herbert's 4th down pass went to ground, keeping the drive going. Completions of 14 and 10 yards to Allen and Palmer, each followed by a timeout, moved the ball to the Raiders' 43 with 40 seconds to play. From there Herbert again threw three incompletions, bring up the third 4th and 10 of the drive. This one was converted with a 14-yard pass to Williams, which the Chargers followed with their final timeout with 14 seconds left. Following an incompletion and a 17-yard sideline catch by Guyton, five seconds remained and the ball was at the Raiders' 12. Williams found just enough space between two defenders to catch Herbert's pass in the front of the end zone as time expired. Hopkins' extra point sent the game to overtime. Herbert completed only 6 of 19 pass attempts on the final drive, but his completions covered 78 yards.

Las Vegas won the overtime coin toss. Josh Jacobs had consecutive carries of 28 and 18 yards to move the ball inside the Chargers' 30, but Carr eventually threw incomplete on 3rd and 3, and Daniel Carlson made a 40-yard field goal. The Chargers were soon on the verge of defeat again, as they gained only a single yard from three plays and faced 4th and 9 from their own 26. Herbert found Williams on a crossing route, and he gained 47 yards before being pushed out of bounds. Los Angeles could gain only four further yards, but Hopkins made a 41-yard field goal with four and a half minutes to play in overtime, tying the game 32–32. Las Vegas, seeking to minimise the risk of defeat and playoff elimination, ran most of the time off the play clock between downs on their final drive. Carr threw completions of 17 and 11 yards, the latter on 3rd and 8, and Jacobs had consecutive carries of 7 and 10 yards, the latter moving the ball to the Chargers' 29 with under 40 seconds to play. Rather than trying to advance any further, the Raiders let the clock run down to two seconds, then called timeout and tried a 47-yard field goal. Carlson converted the kick as time expired in overtime. With this loss, the Chargers were the last team to be eliminated from playoff contention. The Raiders victory allowed them and the Pittsburgh Steelers to clinch a playoff spot.

The Chargers were 6 of 7 on 4th down conversions (one further 4th down attempt was converted by penalty). The six conversions set a new single-game record since the statistic started being recorded in 1991; this record holds as of 2022. For the Raiders, Jacobs had 19 carries for 62 yards in regulation time, but added 7 carries for 69 yards in overtime.

=== Standings ===
==== Division ====
AFC West
| | W | L | T | PCT | DIV | CONF | PF | PA | STK |
|---|---|---|---|---|---|---|---|---|---|
| ^{(2)} Kansas City Chiefs | 12 | 5 | 0 | .706 | 5–1 | 7–5 | 480 | 364 | W1 |
| ^{(5)} Las Vegas Raiders | 10 | 7 | 0 | .588 | 3–3 | 8–4 | 374 | 439 | W4 |
| Los Angeles Chargers | 9 | 8 | 0 | .529 | 3–3 | 6–6 | 474 | 459 | L1 |
| Denver Broncos | 7 | 10 | 0 | .412 | 1–5 | 3–9 | 335 | 322 | L4 |

==== Conference ====
AFC
| # | Team | Division | W | L | T | PCT | DIV | CONF | SOS | SOV | STK |
|---|---|---|---|---|---|---|---|---|---|---|---|
**Division winners**
| 1 (Note: Tennessee finished ahead of Kansas City based on head-to-head victory, claiming the No. 1 seed.) | Tennessee Titans | South | 12 | 5 | 0 | .706 | 5–1 | 8–4 | .472 | .480 | W3 |
| 2 | Kansas City Chiefs | West | 12 | 5 | 0 | .706 | 5–1 | 7–5 | .538 | .517 | W1 |
| 3 | Buffalo Bills | East | 11 | 6 | 0 | .647 | 5–1 | 7–5 | .472 | .428 | W4 |
| 4 | Cincinnati Bengals | North | 10 | 7 | 0 | .588 | 4–2 | 8–4 | .472 | .462 | L1 |
**Wild cards**
| 5 (Note: Las Vegas claimed the No. 5 seed over New England based on win percentage in common games (5–1 vs. 2–4 against: Miami, Dallas, LA Chargers, Cleveland, and Indianapolis).) | Las Vegas Raiders | West | 10 | 7 | 0 | .588 | 3–3 | 8–4 | .510 | .515 | W4 |
| 6 | New England Patriots | East | 10 | 7 | 0 | .588 | 3–3 | 8–4 | .481 | .394 | L1 |
| 7 | Pittsburgh Steelers | North | 9 | 7 | 1 | .559 | 4–2 | 7–5 | .521 | .490 | W2 |
**Did not qualify for the postseason**
| 8 (Note: Indianapolis finished ahead of Miami and Los Angeles based on conference record (7–5 vs. 6–6).) | Indianapolis Colts | South | 9 | 8 | 0 | .529 | 3–3 | 7–5 | .495 | .431 | L2 |
| 9 (Note: Miami finished ahead of LA Chargers based on win percentage in common games (5–1 vs. 2–4 against: New England, Las Vegas, Houston, Baltimore, and NY Giants).) | Miami Dolphins | East | 9 | 8 | 0 | .529 | 4–2 | 6–6 | .464 | .379 | W1 |
| 10 | Los Angeles Chargers | West | 9 | 8 | 0 | .529 | 3–3 | 6–6 | .510 | .500 | L1 |
| 11 (Note: Cleveland finished ahead of Baltimore based on division record (3–3 vs. 1–5).) | Cleveland Browns | North | 8 | 9 | 0 | .471 | 3–3 | 5–7 | .514 | .415 | W1 |
| 12 | Baltimore Ravens | North | 8 | 9 | 0 | .471 | 1–5 | 5–7 | .531 | .460 | L6 |
| 13 | Denver Broncos | West | 7 | 10 | 0 | .412 | 1–5 | 3–9 | .484 | .357 | L4 |
| 14 (Note: NY Jets finished ahead of Houston based on head-to-head victory.) | New York Jets | East | 4 | 13 | 0 | .235 | 0–6 | 4–8 | .512 | .426 | L2 |
| 15 | Houston Texans | South | 4 | 13 | 0 | .235 | 3–3 | 4–8 | .498 | .397 | L2 |
| 16 | Jacksonville Jaguars | South | 3 | 14 | 0 | .176 | 1–5 | 3–9 | .512 | .569 | W1 |
**Tiebreakers** (Note: When breaking ties for three or more teams under the NFL's rules, they are first broken within divisions, then comparing only the highest-ranked remaining team from each division.)

== Statistics ==
=== Team ===
| Category | Total yards | Yards per game | NFL rank (out of 32) |
|---|---|---|---|
| Passing offense | 4,800 | 282.4 | 3rd |
| Rushing offense | 1,834 | 107.9 | 21st |
| Total offense | 6,634 | 390.2 | 4th |
| Passing defense | 3,761 | 221.2 | 12th |
| Rushing defense | 2,361 | 138.9 | 30th |
| Total defense | 6,122 | 360.1 | 23rd |

=== Individual ===
| Category | Player | Total yards |
Offense
| Passing | Justin Herbert | 5,014 |
| Rushing | Austin Ekeler | 911 |
| Receiving | Mike Williams | 1,146 |
Defense
| Tackles (Solo) | Kyzir White | 90 |
| Sacks | Joey Bosa | 10.5 |
| Interceptions | Derwin James; Asante Samuel Jr. Kyzir White | 2 |

Statistics correct as of the end of the 2021 NFL season

== Awards ==
Six Chargers were named to the 2021 Pro Bowl, while three were voted 2nd-team All-Pros by the Associated Press. Also, Slater received a single vote as Offensive Rookie of the Year, as did James for Comeback Player of the Year.

| Player | Position | Pro Bowl starter | Pro Bowl reserve | AP 2nd team All-Pro |
|---|---|---|---|---|
| Keenan Allen | Wide receiver | | Yes | |
| Joey Bosa | Linebacker | Yes | | |
| Justin Herbert | Quarterback | Yes | | |
| Derwin James | Safety | Yes | | |
| Corey Linsley | Center | Yes | | Yes |
| Andre Roberts | Return specialist | | | Yes |
| Rashawn Slater | Offensive tackle | Yes | | Yes |
