= Kiondre Thomas =

American football player (born 1998)

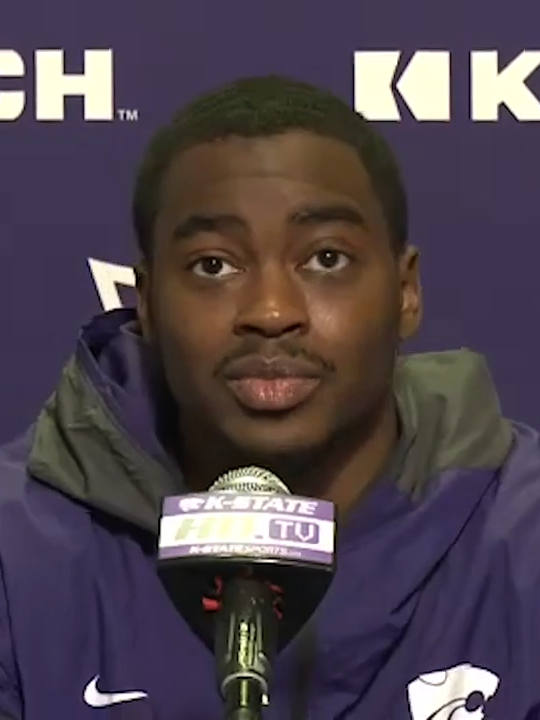
- Thomas in 2020

Profile
- Position: Cornerback

Personal information
- Born: February 7, 1998 (age 28); Fort Smith, Arkansas, U.S.
- Listed height: 6 ft 0 in (1.83 m)
- Listed weight: 186 lb (84 kg)

Career information
- High school: Northside (Fort Smith, Arkansas)
- College: Minnesota (2016–2019); Kansas State (2020)
- NFL draft: 2021: undrafted

Career history
- Cleveland Browns (2021)*; Los Angeles Chargers (2021); Green Bay Packers (2022–2023); Houston Roughnecks (2024); Carolina Panthers (2024)*; Pittsburgh Steelers (2024)*; Houston Roughnecks (2025)*; DC Defenders (2025)
- * Offseason or practice squad member only

Awards and highlights
- UFL champion (2025)

Career NFL statistics as of 2023
- Total tackles: 1
- Fumble recoveries: 1
- Stats at Pro Football Reference

Kiondre Thomas (born February 7, 1998) is an American professional football cornerback. He played college football at Kansas State and was signed as an undrafted free agent by the Cleveland Browns after the 2021 NFL draft.

== College career ==
Thomas was ranked as a three–star recruit by 247Sports.com coming out of high school. He committed to Minnesota on November 12, 2015. After three seasons at Minnesota, Thomas decided to transfer from Minnesota on February 3, 2020. He committed to Kansas State shortly thereafter.

== Professional career ==
Pre-draft measurables
| Height | Weight | Arm length | Hand span | 40-yard dash | 10-yard split | 20-yard split | 20-yard shuttle | Three-cone drill | Vertical jump | Broad jump | Bench press |
|---|---|---|---|---|---|---|---|---|---|---|---|
| 5 ft 11 3/4 in (1.82 m) | 186 lb (84 kg) | 31 5/8 in (0.80 m) | 8 1/8 in (0.21 m) | 4.44 s | 1.56 s | 2.50 s | 4.35 s | 6.94 s | 37.5 in (0.95 m) | 10 ft 2 in (3.10 m) | 10 reps |
All values from Pro Day

=== Cleveland Browns ===
Thomas was signed as an undrafted free agent by the Cleveland Browns on May 3, 2021. Thomas was waived by the Browns with an injury designation on August 16, 2021, and placed on injured reserve. Thomas was waived from injured reserve with an injury settlement on August 20, 2021.

=== Los Angeles Chargers ===
On September 6, 2021, Thomas was signed to the Los Angeles Chargers practice squad.

=== Green Bay Packers ===
On January 26, 2022, Thomas signed a reserve/future contract with the Green Bay Packers. He was waived on August 30, 2022, and signed to the practice squad the next day. On October 1, 2022, Thomas was elevated to the active roster from the practice squad. He signed a reserve/future contract on January 10, 2023. He was released on August 29, 2023. A day later, he was signed to the Packers' practice squad. He was released on October 17.

=== Houston Roughnecks ===
On March 2, 2024, Thomas signed with the Houston Roughnecks of the United Football League (UFL).

=== Carolina Panthers ===
On July 26, 2024, Thomas signed with the Carolina Panthers, but was waived a week later.

=== Pittsburgh Steelers ===
On August 15, 2024, Thomas signed with the Pittsburgh Steelers. He was waived on August 26.

=== Houston Roughnecks (second stint) ===
On October 30, 2024, Thomas re-signed with the Houston Roughnecks of the United Football League (UFL).

=== DC Defenders ===
On November 6, 2024, Thomas was traded to the DC Defenders in exchange for QB Jalan McClendon. He was released on March 19, 2026.

== NFL career statistics ==
Legend
| | Led the league |
| **Bold** | Career-high |

=== Regular season ===
| Year | Team | Games | | Tackles | | | | | Interceptions | | | | | | Fumbles | |
| Year | Team | GP | GS | Cmb | Solo | Ast | TFL | Sck | PD | Int | Yds | Avg | Lng | TD | FF | FR |
|---|---|---|---|---|---|---|---|---|---|---|---|---|---|---|---|---|
| 2021 | LAC | **4** | 0 | **1** | 0 | **1** | 0 | 0.0 | 0 | 0 | 0 | 0.0 | 0 | 0 | 0 | 0 |
| 2023 | GB | 1 | 0 | 0 | 0 | 0 | 0 | 0.0 | 0 | 0 | 0 | 0.0 | 0 | 0 | 0 | **1** |
| Career | | 5 | 1 | 0 | 1 | 0 | 0 | 0.0 | 0 | 0 | 0 | 0.0 | 0 | 0 | 0 | 1 |
Source: pro-football-reference.com
