= Derius Swinton II =

American football player and coach (born 1985)

Personal information
- Born: April 26, 1985 (age 41); Newport News, Virginia, U.S.

Career information
- Position: Safety
- College: Hampton

Career history
- Tennessee (2007−2008) Defensive graduate assistant; St. Louis Rams (2009−2011) Special teams quality control coach; Kansas City Chiefs (2012) Special teams quality control coach; Denver Broncos (2013−2014) Assistant special teams coach; Chicago Bears (2015) Assistant special teams coach; San Francisco 49ers (2016) Special teams coordinator; Chicago Bears (2017) Assistant special teams coach; Detroit Lions (2018) Offensive assistant; Arizona Cardinals (2019) Bill Walsh NFL diversity coaching fellowship; Arizona Cardinals (2020) Assistant special teams coach; Los Angeles Chargers (2021) Special teams coordinator; Las Vegas Raiders (2023–2025) Assistant special teams coach; Las Vegas Raiders (2025) Interim special teams coordinator; Pittsburgh Steelers (2026) Senior assistant special teams coach

Derius Swinton II (born April 26, 1985) is an American football coach who was most recently the senior assistant special teams coach for the Pittsburgh Steelers of the National Football League (NFL). He previously served as an assistant coach for the Arizona Cardinals, Detroit Lions, Chicago Bears, San Francisco 49ers, Denver Broncos, Los Angeles Chargers, Kansas City Chiefs, and Las Vegas Raiders.

== Early years ==
Swinton played college football at Hampton University from 2003 to 2006. He finished his college career with 103 tackles, 19 passes defensed and eight interceptions.

== Coaching career ==
=== Tennessee ===
In 2007, Swinton became a defensive graduate assistant at Tennessee and would stay in that role all the way through the 2008 season.

=== St. Louis Rams ===
In 2009, Swinton was hired by the St. Louis Rams as the special teams quality control coach, he maintained that role for three seasons, before being let go after the 2011 season.

=== Kansas City Chiefs ===
In 2012, Swinton had been offered another job in the same role by the Kansas City Chiefs. He worked with Kansas City's newly hired offensive quality control coach, Jim Bob Cooter, who he was familiar with from his days at Tennessee.

=== Denver Broncos ===
In 2013, Swinton was hired by the Denver Broncos as a special teams assistant. He stayed with Broncos for two seasons from 2013 to 2014.

=== Chicago Bears ===
In 2015, Swinton followed John Fox, who was fired by the Broncos, to the Chicago Bears to serve as a special teams assistant.

=== San Francisco 49ers ===
On January 22, 2016, Swinton was hired by the San Francisco 49ers as their special teams coordinator under by head coach Chip Kelly.

=== Chicago Bears (second stint) ===
Following the firing of Kelly in San Francisco, Swinton returned to the Chicago Bears as their assistant special teams coach in 2017.

=== Detroit Lions ===
In 2018, Swinton was hired by the Detroit Lions as an offensive assistant under head coach Matt Patricia.

=== Arizona Cardinals ===
In 2019, Swinton joined the Arizona Cardinals under the Bill Walsh NFL diversity coaching fellowship. In 2020, Swinton was hired full-time by the Cardinals to serve as their assistant special teams coach.

=== Los Angeles Chargers ===
On January 25, 2021, Swinton was hired by the Los Angeles Chargers as their special teams coordinator under head coach Brandon Staley. Following the 2021 season, on January 19, 2022, Swinton was fired by the Chargers.

=== Las Vegas Raiders ===
On March 3, 2023, Swinton was hired by the Las Vegas Raiders as a special teams assistant. On November 7, 2025, Swinton was appointed as interim special teams coordinator after the firing of Tom McMahon.

=== Pittsburgh Steelers ===
On February 12, 2026, the Pittsburgh Steelers hired Swinton as a senior assistant special teams coach under new head coach Mike McCarthy. On May 29, the Steelers and Swinton parted ways due to a violation of club policy.
