= Mark Webb (safety) =

American gridiron football player (born 1998)

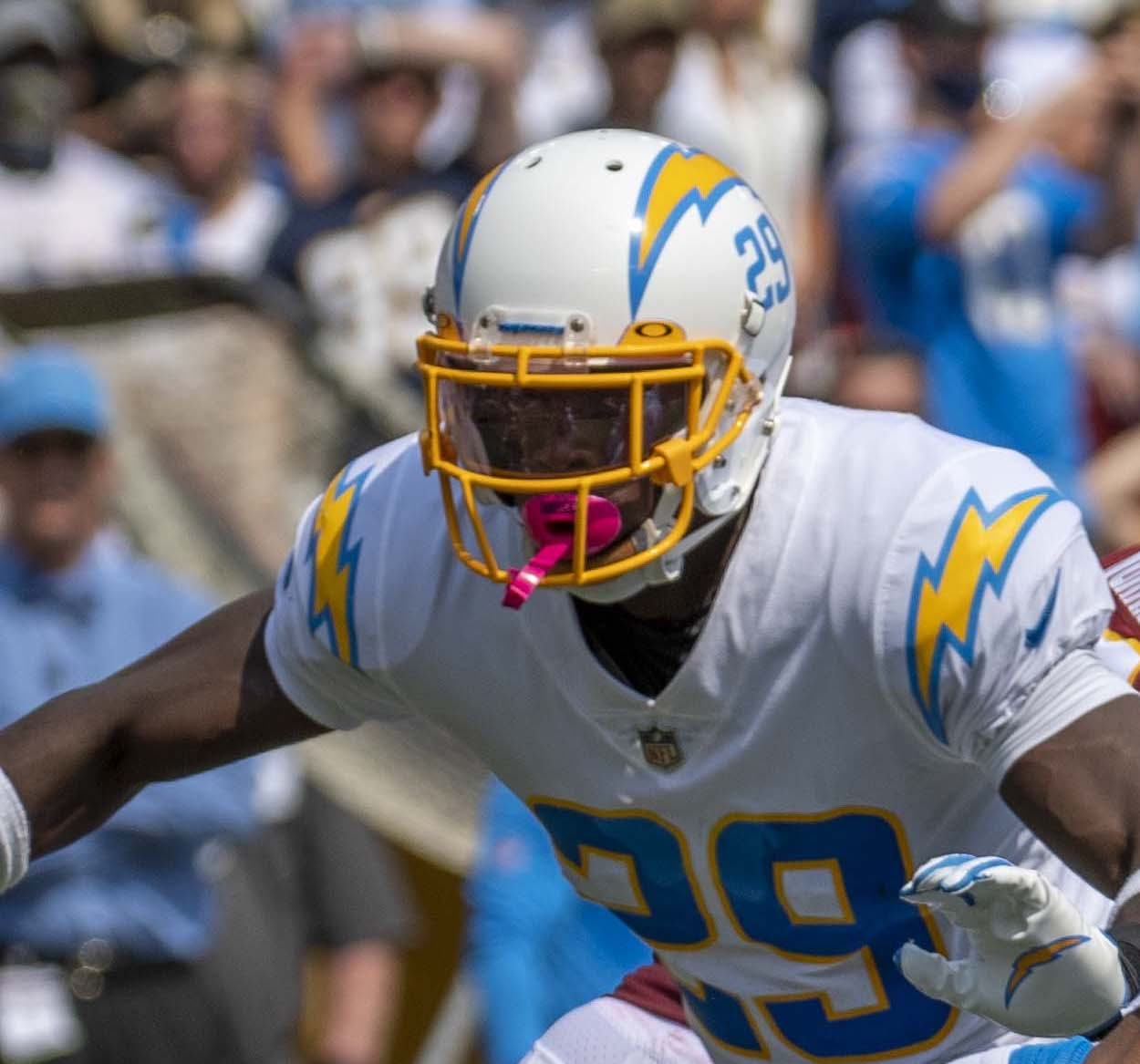
- Webb with Los Angeles Chargers in 2021

Profile
- Position: Defensive back

Personal information
- Born: September 10, 1998 (age 28); Philadelphia, Pennsylvania, U.S.
- Listed height: 6 ft 1 in (1.85 m)
- Listed weight: 207 lb (94 kg)

Career information
- High school: Archbishop Wood Catholic (Warminster, Pennsylvania)
- College: Georgia (2017–2020)
- NFL draft: 2021: 7th round, 241st overall pick

Career history
- Los Angeles Chargers (2021–2023); Saskatchewan Roughriders (2025)*
- * Offseason or practice squad member only

Career NFL statistics
- Total tackles: 3
- Stats at Pro Football Reference
- Stats at CFL.ca

Mark S. Webb (born September 10, 1998) is an American professional football defensive back.

== College career ==
Webb played college football for the Georgia Bulldogs from 2017 to 2020. He played in 49 games where he had 82 tackles, three tackles for loss, nine pass deflections, one interception, and two forced fumbles.

== Professional career ==
Pre-draft measurables
Height	Weight	Arm length	Hand span	40-yard dash	10-yard split	20-yard split	20-yard shuttle	Three-cone drill	Vertical jump	Broad jump
6 ft 1 1/2 in (1.87 m)	207 lb (94 kg)	32 5/8 in (0.83 m)	9 5/8 in (0.24 m)	4.61 s	1.58 s	2.64 s	4.52 s	7.30 s	36.5 in (0.93 m)	11 ft 4 in (3.45 m)
All values from Pro Day

=== Los Angeles Chargers ===
Webb was selected by the Los Angeles Chargers in the seventh round, 241st overall, of the 2021 NFL draft. On May 16, 2021, he signed his four-year rookie contract with Los Angeles. He was placed on injured reserve on November 26, 2021.

On August 30, 2022, Webb was waived by the Chargers and signed to the practice squad the next day. He signed a reserve/future contract on January 17, 2023.

Webb was waived on August 29, 2023, then re-signed to the practice squad on October 10. He was released on November 15. He appeared in seven games over three seasons with the Chargers where he recorded three tackles.

=== Saskatchewan Roughriders ===
On March 3, 2025, Webb signed with the Saskatchewan Roughriders of the Canadian Football League. He was released on May 13, 2025.
