= Corey Linsley =

American football player (born 1991)

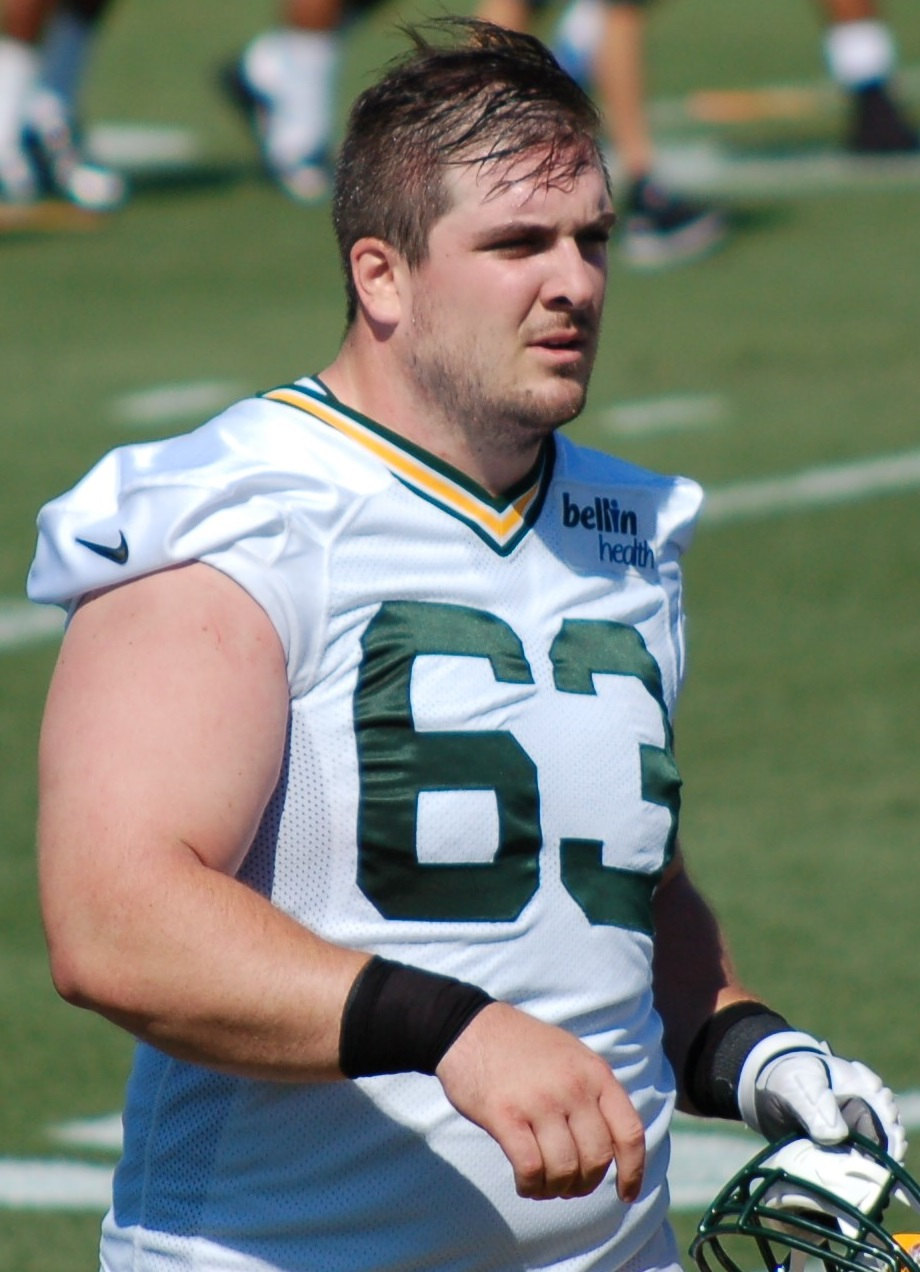
- Linsley with the Green Bay Packers in 2015

No. 63
- Position: Center

Personal information
- Born: July 27, 1991 (age 35); Youngstown, Ohio, U.S.
- Listed height: 6 ft 3 in (1.91 m)
- Listed weight: 301 lb (137 kg)

Career information
- High school: Boardman (Boardman, Ohio)
- College: Ohio State (2009–2013)
- NFL draft: 2014: 5th round, 161st overall pick

Career history
- Green Bay Packers (2014–2020); Los Angeles Chargers (2021–2023)

Awards and highlights
- First-team All-Pro (2020); Second-team All-Pro (2021); Pro Bowl (2021); PFWA All-Rookie Team (2014); First-team All-Big Ten (2013)

Career NFL statistics
- Games played: 132
- Games started: 132
- Fumble recoveries: 2
- Stats at Pro Football Reference

Corey Michael Linsley (born July 27, 1991) is an American former professional football player who was a center in the National Football League (NFL). He played college football for the Ohio State Buckeyes. Linsley was selected by the Green Bay Packers in the fifth round of the 2014 NFL draft, and has also played in the National Football League (NFL) for the Los Angeles Chargers.

== Early life ==
A native of Boardman, Ohio, Linsley attended Boardman High School, where he earned first-team All-Federal League, All-Northeast Ohio and second-team All-Ohio honors. He served as a team captain as a senior. He was named to SuperPrep's Midwest Top 30.

As a standout athlete, he lettered all four years in track & field, where he was the regional and league champion and a state medalist in the shot put (top throw of 19.24 meters as a senior). He also threw the discus, with a top throw of 58.27 meters as a senior. At Ohio State, he considered switching to track and field and quit football entirely.

Regarded as a four-star recruit by Rivals.com, Linsley was listed as the No. 6 offensive guard prospect of his class.

== College career ==
"Linsley's gone from nobody to the apex of the offense."

— Urban Meyer.

After redshirting his initial year at Ohio State, Linsley saw limited action in six games in 2010, mostly as a reserve right guard or tackle. As a sophomore, he appeared in ten games, still as a reserve. He did see significant action on the PAT and field goal teams as a blocker, though.

After playing two seasons at guard, he was designated to succeed All-American center Mike Brewster at center. He started all 12 games at center and help the Buckeyes to post a Big Ten-best 37.2 points per game while ranking second in rushing with an average of 242.2 yards per game on the ground.

Linsley was viewed as an integral part of the Buckeyes' offense.

== Professional career ==
Pre-draft measurables
Height	Weight	Arm length	Hand span	40-yard dash	10-yard split	20-yard split	20-yard shuttle	Three-cone drill	Vertical jump	Broad jump	Bench press	Wonderlic
6 ft 2 5/8 in (1.90 m)	296 lb (134 kg)	32 in (0.81 m)	9 7/8 in (0.25 m)	5.03 s	1.78 s	2.82 s	4.53 s	7.46 s	27 in (0.69 m)	8 ft 11 in (2.72 m)	36 reps	33
All values from NFL Combine/Pro Day

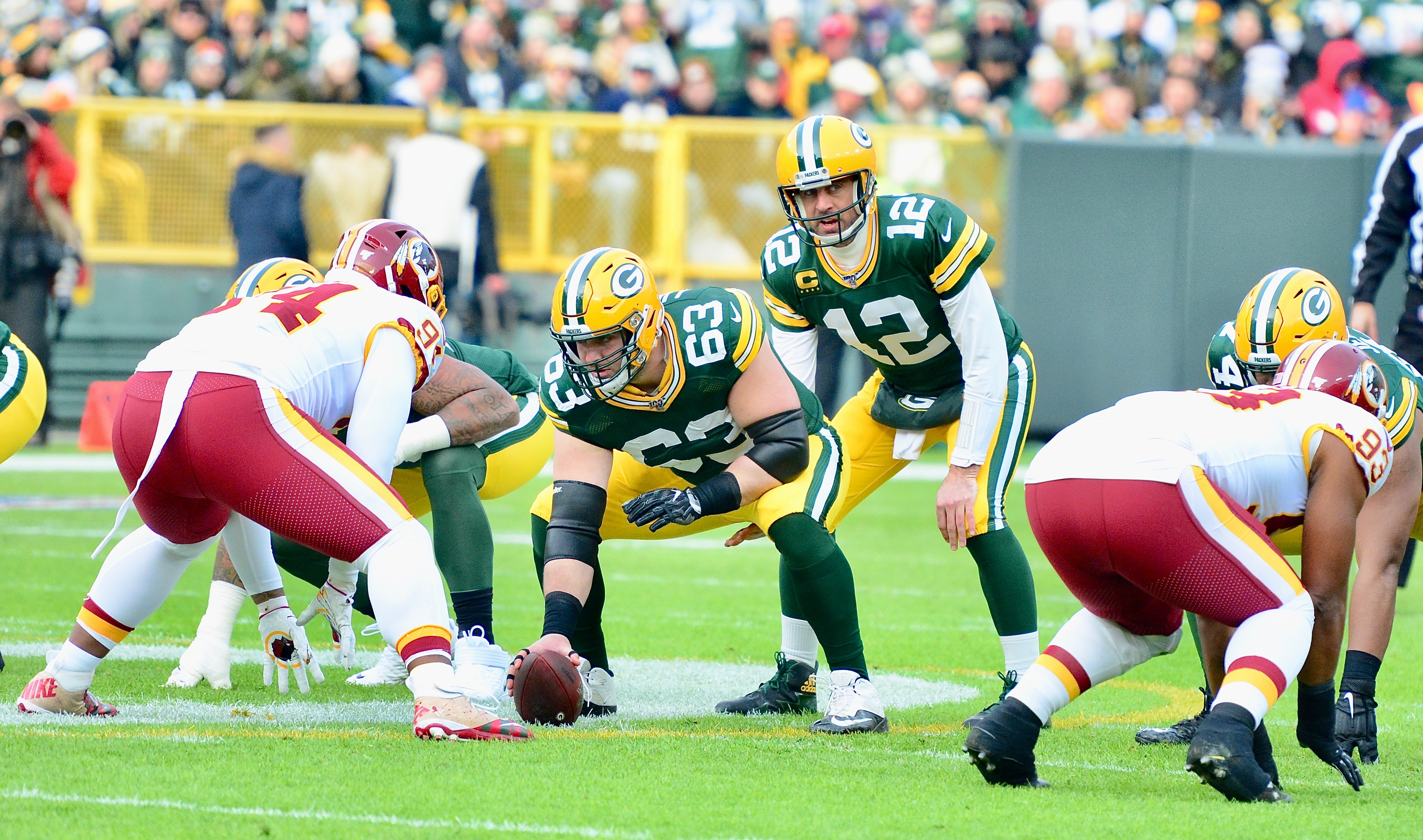
Linsley in a game against the Washington Redskins

=== Green Bay Packers ===
Linsley was selected in the fifth round (161st overall) by the Green Bay Packers in the 2014 NFL draft. On May 15, 2014, he signed a contract with the Packers.

In 2014, Linsley was initially supposed to be the Packers' back-up center, but an injury to expected starter J. C. Tretter late in the preseason made Linsley the surprise starting center for the regular season. After Tretter came back from his injury, Linsley remained as starting center and ended up starting every game during the regular season as well as the 2 playoff games. He was named to the PFWA All-Rookie Team.

On September 3, 2016, Linsley was placed on Reserve/PUP to start the season after a lingering hamstring injury. He was activated off PUP on November 5, 2016.

On December 30, 2017, Linsley signed a three-year, $25.5 million contract extension with the Packers after starting all 16 games at center in 2017.

On December 5, 2020, Linsley was placed on injured reserve after suffering a knee injury in Week 12. On December 26, 2020, Linsley was activated off of injured reserve.

=== Los Angeles Chargers ===
On March 17, 2021, Linsley signed a five-year, $62.5 million contract with the Los Angeles Chargers, making him the highest-paid center in the league.

On September 30, 2023, Linsley was placed on the reserve/non-football illness list with a non-emergency heart-related issue.

On June 5, 2024, Linsley was released by the Chargers and retired from professional football.

== Personal life ==
Linsley is married to Anna Linsley. They have four children together.
