= 2023 Los Angeles Chargers season =

64th season in franchise history

- Owner: Dean Spanos
- General manager: Tom Telesco (fired December 15); JoJo Wooden (interim)
- Head coach: Brandon Staley (fired December 15, 5–9 record); Giff Smith (interim; 0–3 record)
- Home stadium: SoFi Stadium

Results
- Record: 5–12
- Division place: 4th AFC West
- Playoffs: Did not qualify
- All-Pros: PR Derius Davis (2nd team)
- Pro Bowlers: WR Keenan Allen; OLB Khalil Mack

Uniform
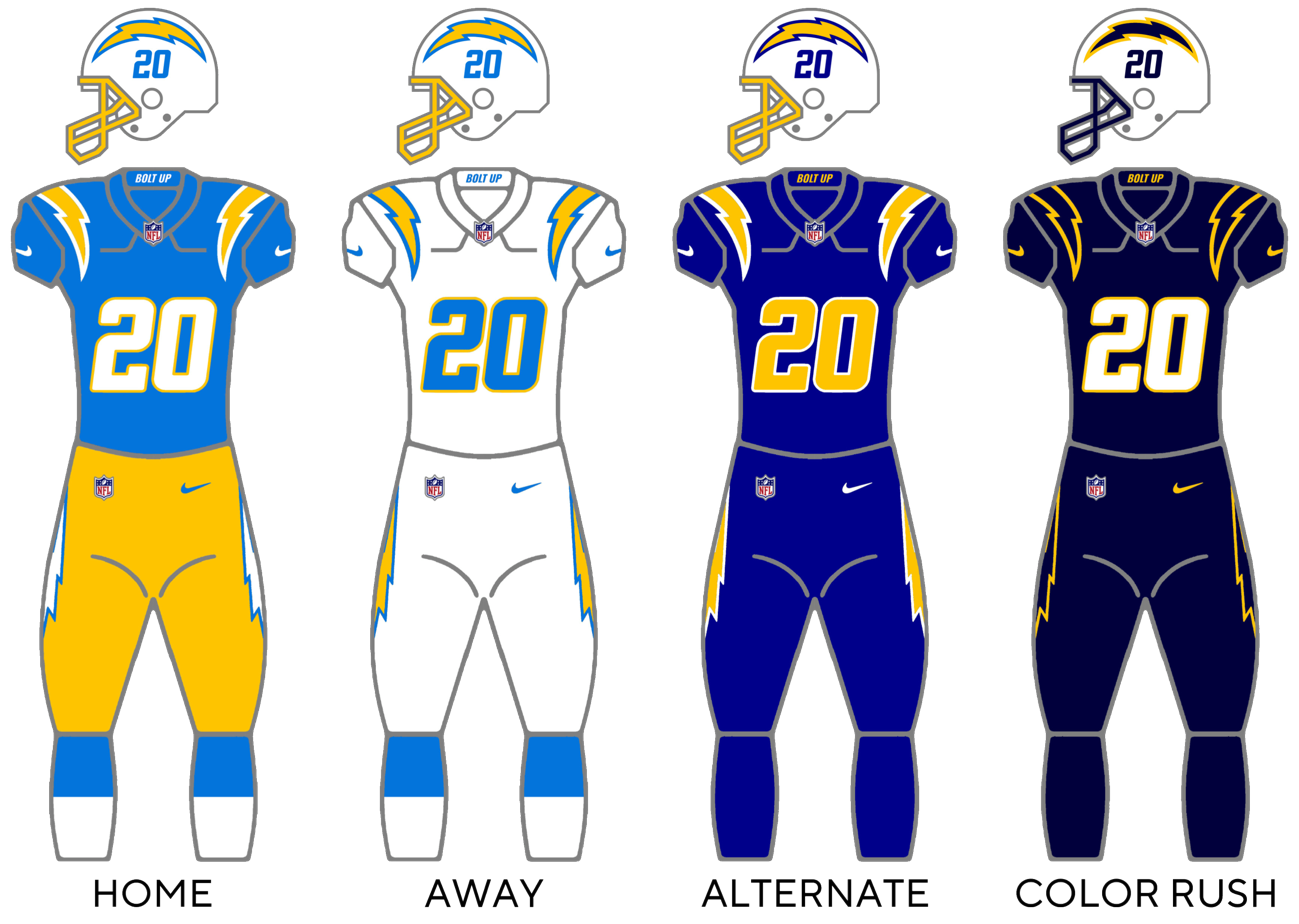

The 2023 season was the Los Angeles Chargers' 54th season in the National Football League (NFL), their 64th overall, their eighth in the Greater Los Angeles Area, their fourth playing their home games at SoFi Stadium, their eleventh and final under general manager Tom Telesco and their third and final under head coach Brandon Staley. The Chargers failed to improve on their 10–7 record from the previous season following a Week 12, 20–10 loss to the Baltimore Ravens. They then guaranteed a worse record following a Week 14, 24–7 loss to the Denver Broncos. Following a Week 15 blowout loss to the Las Vegas Raiders, both Brandon Staley and Tom Telesco were fired. With a Week 16 loss to the Buffalo Bills, the Chargers were eliminated from playoff contention.

Already struggling with a 5–7 start, the Chargers were dealt with a devastating blow when they lost franchise quarterback, Justin Herbert following a week 14 loss to the Denver Broncos to a broken finger. Los Angeles lost 7 games decided by 3 points or less, the most in the NFL. Their .294 winning percentage was their worst since 2015 when they were based in San Diego.

The Los Angeles Chargers drew an average home attendance of 69,736 in 9 home games in the 2023 NFL season.

== Roster changes ==
=== Free agency ===
==== Unrestricted ====
Position	Player	2023 team	Date signed	Contract
FS	Nasir Adderley	Retired		
CB	Bryce Callahan			
KR	DeAndre Carter	Las Vegas Raiders	March 30, 2023	1 year, $1.5 million
C	Will Clapp	Los Angeles Chargers	April 6, 2023	1 year, $1.18 million
DE	Christian Covington	Detroit Lions	May 10, 2023	1 year, $1.165 million
QB	Chase Daniel	Retired		
NT	Tyeler Davison			
DE	Morgan Fox	Los Angeles Chargers	March 15, 2023	2 years, $7.25 million
OT	Trey Pipkins	Los Angeles Chargers	March 14, 2023	3 years, $21.75 million
ILB	Troy Reeder	Minnesota Vikings	March 22, 2023	1 year, $1.2325 million
TE	Richard Rodgers			
P	J. K. Scott	Los Angeles Chargers	March 17, 2023	2 years, $4 million
QB	Easton Stick	Los Angeles Chargers	March 13, 2023	1 year, $1.8 million
ILB	Drue Tranquill	Kansas City Chiefs	March 17, 2023	1 year, $5 million
LB	Kyle Van Noy			

==== Restricted and exclusive-rights ====
Position	Player	Tag	2023 team	Date signed	Contract
WR	Michael Bandy	ERFA	Houston Roughnecks (XFL)	March 29, 2023	1 year
K	Cameron Dicker	ERFA	Los Angeles Chargers	March 14, 2023	1 year, $705 thousand
DE	Breiden Fehoko	ERFA	Pittsburgh Steelers	March 30, 2023	1 year, $940 thousand
DE	Joe Gaziano	RFA	Atlanta Falcons	March 27, 2023	1 year, $1.01 million
WR	Jalen Guyton	RFA	Los Angeles Chargers	April 17, 2023	1 year, $1.2325 million
CB	Kemon Hall	ERFA	Los Angeles Chargers	March 22, 2023	1 year, $940 thousand
DE	Forrest Merrill	ERFA	Seattle Seahawks	May 15, 2023	1 year, $870 thousand
OT	Storm Norton	RFA	New Orleans Saints	March 16, 2023	1 year, $1.01 million
TE	Donald Parham	RFA	Los Angeles Chargers	March 17, 2023	2 years, $2.65 million
OT	Foster Sarell	ERFA	Los Angeles Chargers	March 14, 2023	1 year, $705 thousand
DE	Derrek Tuszka	RFA			
Restricted Free Agent (RFA): Players with three accrued seasons whose contracts expired at the end of the previous season Exclusive-Rights Free Agent (ERFA): Players with two or fewer accrued seasons whose contracts expired at the end of the previous season

==== Futures ====
Shortly after the end of their 2022 season, the Chargers signed twelve players on their practice squad to reserve/future free agent contracts.

Position	Player	Date signed
OT	Zack Bailey	January 17, 2023
WR	Keelan Doss	January 17, 2023
WR	John Hightower	January 17, 2023
CB	Michael Jacquet	January 17, 2023
TE	Hunter Kampmoyer	January 17, 2023
OLB	Carlo Kemp	January 17, 2023
ILB	Tyreek Maddox-Williams	January 17, 2023
NT	David Moa	January 17, 2023
G	Austen Pleasants	January 17, 2023
RB	Larry Rountree III	January 17, 2023
OLB	Ty Shelby	January 17, 2023
FS	Mark Webb	January 17, 2023

=== Signings ===
Position	Player	Previous team	Date signed	Contract
ILB	Eric Kendricks	Minnesota Vikings	March 15, 2023	2 years, $13.25 million
DE	C. J. Okoye	None (IPPP)	May 4, 2023	3 years, $2.695 million
DE	Nick Williams	New York Giants	May 18, 2023	1 year, $1.23 million
WR	Darrius Shepherd	St. Louis Battlehawks (XFL)	June 2, 2023	1 year, $940 thousand
WR	Milton Wright	Purdue (FBS)	July 26, 2023	1 year, $750 thousand
ILB	Blake Lynch	Arizona Cardinals	July 28, 2023	1 year, $940 thousand
OT	Matt Kaskey	Birmingham Stallions (USFL)	August 9, 2023	1 year, $940 thousand
RB	Aaron Shampklin	Indianapolis Colts	August 15, 2023	1 year, $750 thousand
CB	Matt Hankins	Birmingham Stallions (USFL)	August 16, 2023	1 year, $750 thousand
ILB	Tae Crowder	Pittsburgh Steelers	August 22, 2023	1 year, $1.01 million
CB	Chris Wilcox (Note: Signed to the practice squad.)	Pittsburgh Steelers	September 1, 2023	1 year, $216 thousand

=== Retirements ===
Free safety Nasir Adderley announced his retirement on March 16. Adderley was drafted by the Chargers in 2019 and appeared in 50 games in four seasons.

Position	Player	Date retired
FS	Nasir Adderley	March 16, 2023
QB	Chase Daniel	September 5, 2023

=== Releases/waivers ===
Position	Player	2023 team	Date released/waived
G	Matt Feiler	Tampa Bay Buccaneers	March 14, 2023
LB	Damon Lloyd	Birmingham Stallions (USFL)	May 31, 2023
LB	Tyreek Maddox-Williams	Philadelphia Eagles	July 28, 2023
OT	Nic Melsop (Note: Placed on injured reserve.)	Injury settlement	August 9, 2023
RB	Larry Rountree III	Houston Texans	August 14, 2023
CB	Kemon Hall	Injury settlement	August 16, 2023
OT	Andrew Trainer		August 23, 2023
WR	Keelan Doss	Practice squad	August 29, 2023
OLB	Brevin Allen	Practice squad	August 29, 2023
OT	Zack Bailey	Practice squad	August 29, 2023
S	Tyler Baker-Williams		August 29, 2023
C	Johari Branch		August 29, 2023
CB	Cam Brown		August 29, 2023
WR	Terrell Bynum	Practice squad	August 29, 2023
NT	Jerrod Clark	Practice squad	August 29, 2023
LB	Tae Crowder		August 29, 2023
QB	Max Duggan	Practice squad	August 29, 2023
LB	Nathan East		August 29, 2023
TE	Michael Ezeike		August 29, 2023
LB	Andrew Farmer	Practice squad	August 29, 2023
CB	Matt Hankins	Practice squad	August 29, 2023
WR	John Hightower		August 29, 2023
RB	Tyler Hoosman		August 29, 2023
CB	Michael Jacquet		August 29, 2023
LB	Mikel Jones		August 29, 2023
TE	Hunter Kampmoyer	Practice squad	August 29, 2023
LB	Carlo Kemp	Practice squad	August 29, 2023
DE	Terrance Lang		August 29, 2023
NT	David Moa		August 29, 2023
CB	Tiawan Mullen	Philadelphia Eagles	August 29, 2023
DE	C. J. Okoye	Practice squad	August 29, 2023
G	Austen Pleasants	Practice squad	August 29, 2023
RB	Aaron Shampklin		August 29, 2023
OLB	Ty Shelby		August 29, 2023
C	Isaac Weaver		August 29, 2023
CB	Mark Webb Jr.		August 29, 2023
WR	Pokey Wilson		August 29, 2023
OT	Matt Kaskey	Injury settlement	August 29, 2023
ILB	Blake Lynch	Injury settlement	August 29, 2023
WR	Darrius Shepherd	Injury settlement	August 29, 2023
CB	Amechi Uzodinma		August 29, 2023
WR	Milton Wright	Injury settlement	August 29, 2023
Roster cut to 53 on August 29
FB	Zander Horvath	Pittsburgh Steelers	August 30, 2023

=== Contract extensions ===
Position	Player	Date signed	Contract
QB	Justin Herbert	April 28, 2023	Fifth-year option
QB	Justin Herbert	July 25, 2023	5 years, $262.5 million

=== Player trades ===
Position	Player	From/to	Date traded	For
K	Dustin Hopkins	Cleveland Browns	August 28, 2023	2025 seventh-round pick

=== Practice squad elevations ===
Each NFL team is permitted to elevate up to two players from the practice squad to the active game day roster per week, with those designated players being allowed to return to the practice squad up to two times without being exposed to waivers. If a practice squad player is elevated to the game day roster for a third time, that player will be required to clear waivers before returning to the practice squad. Teams are also permitted to protect a maximum of four practice squad players to prevent opposing teams from signing those players to their active rosters.

Week	Player(s) promoted	Source
1	OLB Brevin Allen	

=== Injuries ===
- July 26: Wide receiver Jalen Guyton, nose tackle Austin Johnson, and defensive end Otito Ogbonnia were placed on the PUP list.
- August 16: Cornerback Kemon Hall was waived with an injury designation.
- August 17: Defensive lineman Austin Johnson was activated from the PUP list. Kemon Hall was placed on injured reserve.

== NFL draft ==
2023 Los Angeles Chargers draft selections
Round	Selection	Player	Position	College	Notes
1	21	Quentin Johnston	WR	TCU	
2	54	Tuli Tuipulotu	OLB	USC	
3	85	Daiyan Henley	ILB	Washington State	
4	125	Derius Davis	WR	TCU	
5	156	Jordan McFadden	OT	Clemson	
6	200	Scott Matlock	DT	Boise State	from LA Chargers (Note: The Chargers traded a sixth-round selection (200th overall) and a 2022 second-round selection (48th overall) to the Chicago Bears in exchange for LB Khalil Mack.) via Chicago (Note: The Chargers traded two 2022 seventh-round selections (254th and 255th overall) to the Chicago Bears in exchange for a sixth-round selection (200th overall).)
7	239	Max Duggan	QB	TCU	

2023 Los Angeles Chargers undrafted free agents
Name	Position	College	Ref.
Brevin Allen	OLB	Campbell	
Tyler Baker-Williams	S	North Carolina State	
Johari Branch	C	Maryland	
Cam Brown	CB	Ohio State	
Terrell Bynum	WR	USC	
Jerrod Clark	DL	Coastal Carolina	
Elijah Dotson	RB	Northern Colorado	
Nathan East	LB	Samford	
Michael Ezeike	TE	UCLA	
Andrew Farmer	OLB	Lane	
A. J. Finley	S	Mississippi	
Tyler Hoosman	RB	North Dakota	
Mikel Jones	LB	Syracuse	
Terrance Lang	DL	Colorado	
Nicolas Melsop	T	Delta State	
Tiawan Mullen	CB	Indiana	
AJ Uzodinma	CB	Ball State	
Pokey Wilson	WR	Florida State	
Milton Wright	WR	Purdue	

Draft trades

== Staff ==
=== Coaching changes ===
2023 Los Angeles Chargers Staff Changes
Coach	Position	Reason left	Replacement
Joe Lombardi	Offensive coordinator	Fired	Kellen Moore
Shane Day	Passing game coordinator/quarterbacks coach	Fired	Doug Nussmeier
Michael Wilhoite	Linebackers coach	Fired	Jeff Howard
Isaac Shewmaker	Defensive quality control coach	Accepted job with Denver Broncos	Robert Muschamp
Renaldo Hill	Defensive coordinator	Accepted job with Miami Dolphins	Derrick Ansley
Derrick Ansley	Secondary coach	Promoted to defensive coordinator	Tom Donatell
Tom Donatell	Assistant secondary coach	Promoted to defensive passing game coordinator/secondary coach	Will Harris
Damon Mitchell	Head athletic trainer	Fired	Sal López
Marco Zucconi	Associate athletic trainer	Promoted to Director of Player Health and Performance	None

2023 Los Angeles Chargers staff
Front office: Chairman/owner/president – Dean Spanos; Vice chairman – Michael Spanos; Executive vice president/COO/CFO – Jeanne Bonk; CEO/president of business operations – A. G. Spanos; Interim general manager – JoJo Wooden; President of football operations – John Spanos; Executive vice president of football administration/player finance – Ed McGuire; Director of pro scouting – Dennis Abraham; Senior director of pro personnel – Louis Clark; Director of college scouting – Kevin Kelly; Head coaches: Head coach – Brandon Staley; fired on December 15; Interim head coach/outside linebackers – Giff Smith; Offensive coaches: Offensive coordinator – Kellen Moore; Quarterbacks – Doug Nussmeier; Running backs – Derrick Foster; Wide receivers – Chris Beatty; Tight ends – Kevin Koger; Offensive line – Brendan Nugent; Assistant offensive line – Shaun Sarrett; Passing game specialist – Tom Arth; Offensive assistant – Phil Serchia; Offensive assistant – Pat White; Offensive quality control – Chandler Whitmer	Defensive coaches: Defensive coordinator – Derrick Ansley; Defensive run game coordinator/defensive line – Jay Rodgers; fired on December 15; Assistant defensive line – John Timu; Linebackers – Jeff Howard; Defensive passing game coordinator/secondary – Tom Donatell; Assistant secondary – Will Harris; Front seven specialist – Mike Hiestand; Defensive quality control – Robert Muschamp; Special teams coaches: Special teams coordinator – Ryan Ficken; Assistant special teams – Chris Gould; Strength and conditioning: Director of sports performance – Anthony Lomando; Head strength and conditioning – Jonathan Brooks; Assistant strength and conditioning – Lucius Jordan

== Final roster ==
2023 Los Angeles Chargers roster
Quarterbacks (QB): 4 Will Grier; 2 Easton Stick; Running backs (RB): 30 Austin Ekeler; 25 Joshua Kelley; 28 Isaiah Spiller; Wide receivers (WR): 13 Keenan Allen; 12 Derius Davis; 86 Keelan Doss; 82 Alex Erickson; 15 Jalen Guyton; 1 Quentin Johnston; 5 Josh Palmer; Tight ends (TE): 7 Gerald Everett; 89 Donald Parham; 84 Stone Smartt; 83 Nick Vannett	Offensive linemen (OL): 64 Brenden Jaimes G; 77 Zion Johnson G; 71 Jordan McFadden G; 79 Trey Pipkins T; 68 Jamaree Salyer G; 73 Foster Sarell T; 70 Rashawn Slater T; 66 Cameron Tom C; Defensive linemen (DL): 56 Morgan Fox DE; 98 Austin Johnson DE; 99 Scott Matlock DE; 93 Otito Ogbonnia NT; 95 Nick Williams DE	Linebackers (LB): 92 Andrew Farmer OLB; 0 Daiyan Henley ILB; 6 Eric Kendricks ILB; 53 Blake Lynch ILB; 52 Khalil Mack OLB; 9 Kenneth Murray ILB; 31 Nick Niemann ILB; 57 Amen Ogbongbemiga ILB; 59 Ty Shelby OLB; 45 Tuli Tuipulotu OLB; Defensive backs (DB): 43 Michael Davis CB; 27 Essang Bassey CB; 24 A. J. Finley FS; 32 Alohi Gilman FS; 37 Jaylinn Hawkins SS; 3 Derwin James SS; 33 Deane Leonard CB; 20 Dean Marlowe FS; 26 Asante Samuel Jr. CB; 36 Ja'Sir Taylor CB; 22 JT Woods FS; Special teams (ST): 11 Cameron Dicker K; 47 Josh Harris LS; 16 J. K. Scott P	Practice squad: 90 Brevin Allen OLB; 40 Stephen Anderson TE; 35 Terrell Bynum WR; 72 Jerrod Clark NT; 96 Christian Covington DE; 42 Elijah Dotson RB; 8 Max Duggan QB; 87 Simi Fehoko WR; 23 Matt Hankins CB; 91 Christopher Hinton NT; 48 Hunter Kampmoyer TE; 65 Brent Laing C; 67 C. J. Okoye DE (IPP); 75 Austen Pleasants LT; 38 Chris Wilcox CB; Reserve: 78 Zack Bailey RT (IR); 97 Joey Bosa OLB (IR); 76 Will Clapp C (IR); 10 Justin Herbert QB (IR); 58 Justin Hollins OLB (IR); 41 Raheem Layne SS (IR); 63 Corey Linsley C (NF-Ill.); 44 Tanner Muse ILB (IR); 94 Chris Rumph II OLB (IR); 62 Andrew Trainer RT (IR); -- Amechi Uzodinma CB (IR); 81 Mike Williams WR (IR); Rookies in italics 53 active, 12 reserve, 14 practice squad (1 exempt)

== Preseason ==
The Chargers' preseason opponents and schedule were announced on May 16, 2023. The Chargers held joint practices with the New Orleans Saints on August 17 and 18 at the Jack Hammett Sports Complex in Costa Mesa, California.

Week	Date	Opponent	Result	Record	Venue	Recap
1	August 12	at Los Angeles Rams	W 34–17	1–0	SoFi Stadium	Recap
2	August 20	New Orleans Saints	L 17–22	1–1	SoFi Stadium	Recap
3	August 25	at San Francisco 49ers	W 23–12	2–1	Levi's Stadium	Recap

== Regular season ==
=== Schedule ===
Week	Date	Opponent	Result	Record	Venue	Recap
1	September 10	Miami Dolphins	**L** 34–36	0–1	SoFi Stadium	Recap
2	September 17	at Tennessee Titans	**L** 24–27 (OT)	0–2	Nissan Stadium	Recap
3	September 24	at Minnesota Vikings	**W** 28–24	1–2	U.S. Bank Stadium	Recap
4	October 1	**Las Vegas Raiders**	**W** 24–17	2–2	SoFi Stadium	Recap
5	Bye					
6	October 16	Dallas Cowboys	**L** 17–20	2–3	SoFi Stadium	Recap
7	October 22	at **Kansas City Chiefs**	**L** 17–31	2–4	Arrowhead Stadium	Recap
8	October 29	Chicago Bears	**W** 30–13	3–4	SoFi Stadium	Recap
9	November 6	at New York Jets	**W** 27–6	4–4	MetLife Stadium	Recap
10	November 12	Detroit Lions	**L** 38–41	4–5	SoFi Stadium	Recap
11	November 19	at Green Bay Packers	**L** 20–23	4–6	Lambeau Field	Recap
12	November 26	Baltimore Ravens	**L** 10–20	4–7	SoFi Stadium	Recap
13	December 3	at New England Patriots	**W** 6–0	5–7	Gillette Stadium	Recap
14	December 10	**Denver Broncos**	**L** 7–24	5–8	SoFi Stadium	Recap
15	December 14	at **Las Vegas Raiders**	**L** 21–63	5–9	Allegiant Stadium	Recap
16	December 23	Buffalo Bills	**L** 22–24	5–10	SoFi Stadium	Recap
17	December 31	at **Denver Broncos**	**L** 9–16	5–11	Empower Field at Mile High	Recap
18	January 7	**Kansas City Chiefs**	**L** 12–13	5–12	SoFi Stadium	Recap

Note: Intra-division opponents are in bold text.

=== Game summaries ===
==== Week 1: vs. Miami Dolphins ====
Week 1: Miami Dolphins at Los Angeles Chargers – Game summary

Quarter	1	2	3	4	Total
**Dolphins**	7	13	7	9	**36**
Chargers	7	10	7	10	**34**

at SoFi Stadium, Inglewood, California

- Date: September 10
- Game time: 1:25 p.m. PDT
- Game weather: Partly cloudy, 90 °F (32 °C) (fixed roof)
- Game attendance: 70,240
- Referee: Brad Allen
- TV announcers (CBS): Kevin Harlan, Trent Green and Melanie Collins
- Recap, Game Book

Game information

**First quarter**

- LAC – Austin Ekeler 1-yard run (Cameron Dicker kick), 4:39. Chargers 7–0. **Drive: 14 plays, 94 yards, 7:23.**
- MIA – Raheem Mostert 2-yard run (Jason Sanders kick), 1:15. Tied 7–7. **Drive: 9 plays, 75 yards, 3:24.**

**Second quarter**

- MIA – Jason Sanders 23-yard field goal, 11:43. Dolphins 10–7. **Drive: 8 plays, 72 yards, 3:03.**
- LAC – Donald Parham 1-yard pass from Justin Herbert (Cameron Dicker kick), 9:07. Chargers 14–10. **Drive: 6 plays, 75 yards, 2:36.**
- MIA – River Cracraft 1-yard pass from Tua Tagovailoa (Jason Sanders kick), 1:49. Dolphins 17–14. **Drive: 12 plays, 80 yards, 4:52.**
- LAC – Cameron Dicker 50-yard field goal, 0:09. Tied 17–17. **Drive: 10 plays, 43 yards, 1:33.**
- MIA – Jason Sanders 41-yard field goal, 0:00. Dolphins 20–17. **Drive: 2 plays, 52 yards, 0:09.**

**Third quarter**

- LAC – Justin Herbert 1-yard run (Cameron Dicker kick), 9:16. Chargers 24–20. **Drive: 11 plays, 75 yards, 5:41.**
- MIA – Tyreek Hill 35-yard pass from Tua Tagovailoa (Jason Sanders kick), 2:12. Dolphins 27–24. **Drive: 1 play, 35 yards, 0:06.**

**Fourth quarter**

- LAC – Joshua Kelley 2-yard run (Cameron Dicker kick), 14:00. Chargers 31–27. **Drive: 10 plays, 75 yards, 3:12.**
- MIA – Jason Sanders 45-yard field goal, 10:03. Chargers 31–30. **Drive: 9 plays, 48 yards, 3:57.**
- LAC – Cameron Dicker 25-yard field goal, 3:53. Chargers 34–30. **Drive: 13 plays, 68 yards, 6:10.**
- MIA – Tyreek Hill 4-yard pass from Tua Tagovailoa (kick failed), 1:45. Dolphins 36–34. **Drive: 8 plays, 75 yards, 2:08.**

**Top passers**

- MIA – Tua Tagovailoa – 28/45, 466 yards, 3 TD, INT
- LAC – Justin Herbert – 23/33, 228 yards, TD

**Top rushers**

- MIA – Raheem Mostert – 10 rushes, 37 yards, TD
- LAC – Austin Ekeler – 16 rushes, 117 yards, TD

**Top receivers**

- MIA – Tyreek Hill – 11 receptions, 215 yards, 2 TD
- LAC – Keenan Allen – 6 receptions, 76 yards

==== Week 2: at Tennessee Titans ====
Week 2: Los Angeles Chargers at Tennessee Titans – Game summary

Quarter	1	2	3	4	OT	Total
Chargers	3	11	0	10	0	**24**
**Titans**	0	10	7	7	3	**27**

at Nissan Stadium, Nashville, Tennessee

- Date: September 17
- Game time: 12:00 p.m. CDT/10:00 a.m. PDT
- Game weather: Cloudy, 64 °F (18 °C)
- Game attendance: 67,438
- Referee: Alan Eck
- TV announcers (CBS): Tom McCarthy, James Lofton, Jay Feely and Tiffany Blackmon
- Recap, Game Book

Game information

**First quarter**

- LAC – Cameron Dicker 27-yard field goal, 3:46. Chargers 3–0. **Drive: 11 plays, 39 yards, 4:25.**

**Second quarter**

- LAC – Keenan Allen 8-yard pass from Justin Herbert (Justin Herbert–Trey Pipkins pass), 8:16. Chargers 11–0. **Drive: 8 plays, 47 yards, 3:34.**
- TEN – Derrick Henry 1-yard run (Nick Folk kick), 7:09. Chargers 11–7. **Drive: 3 plays, 75 yards, 1:07.**
- LAC – Cameron Dicker 30-yard field goal, 4:23. Chargers 14–7. **Drive: 7 plays, 63 yards, 2:46.**
- TEN – Nick Folk 33-yard field goal, 0:00. Chargers 14–10. **Drive: 9 plays, 60 yards, 4:23.**

**Third quarter**

- TEN – Ryan Tannehill 12-yard run (Nick Folk kick), 10:08. Titans 17–14. **Drive: 9 plays, 75 yards, 4:52.**

**Fourth quarter**

- LAC – Keenan Allen 12-yard pass from Justin Herbert (Cameron Dicker kick), 14:38. Chargers 21–17. **Drive: 7 plays, 80 yards, 3:01.**
- TEN – Nick Westbrook-Ikhine 4-yard pass from Ryan Tannehill (Nick Folk kick), 2:22. Titans 24–21. **Drive: 7 plays, 82 yards, 3:38.**
- LAC – Cameron Dicker 33-yard field goal, 0:00. Tied 24–24. **Drive: 10 plays, 60 yards, 2:22.**

**Overtime**

- TEN – Nick Folk 41-yard field goal, 5:02. Titans 27–24. **Drive: 8 plays, 38 yards, 4:30.**

**Top passers**

- LAC – Justin Herbert – 27/41, 305 yards, 2 TD
- TEN – Ryan Tannehill – 20/24, 246 yards, TD

**Top rushers**

- LAC – Joshua Kelley – 13 rushes, 39 yards
- TEN – Derrick Henry – 25 rushes, 80 yards, TD

**Top receivers**

- LAC – Keenan Allen – 8 receptions, 111 yards, 2 TD
- TEN – Treylon Burks – 3 rushes, 76 yards

The Chargers blew an 11–0 lead and lost to the Titans, 27–24, in overtime, on a 41-yard field goal by Nick Folk. With the loss, the Chargers fell to 0–2.

==== Week 3: at Minnesota Vikings ====
Week 3: Los Angeles Chargers at Minnesota Vikings – Game summary

Quarter	1	2	3	4	Total
**Chargers**	7	7	7	7	**28**
Vikings	0	10	7	7	**24**

at U.S. Bank Stadium, Minneapolis, Minnesota

- Date: September 24
- Game time: 12:00 p.m. CDT/10:00 a.m. PDT
- Game weather: None (indoor stadium)
- Game attendance: 66,878
- Referee: Shawn Smith
- TV announcers (Fox): Kevin Kugler, Mark Sanchez and Laura Okmin
- Recap, Game Book

Game information

**First quarter**

- LAC – Donald Parham 3-yard pass from Justin Herbert (Cameron Dicker kick), 2:51. Chargers 7–0. **Drive: 12 plays, 79 yards, 5:41.**

**Second quarter**

- MIN – Josh Oliver 4-yard pass from Kirk Cousins (Greg Joseph kick), 7:27. Tied 7–7. **Drive: 5 plays, 75 yards, 2:46.**
- MIN – Greg Joseph 23-yard field goal, 2:08. Vikings 10–7. **Drive: 11 plays, 40 yards, 3:54.**
- LAC – Donald Parham 1-yard pass from Justin Herbert (Cameron Dicker kick), 0:47. Chargers 14–10. **Drive: 10 plays, 75 yards, 1:21.**

**Third quarter**

- LAC – Mike Williams 49-yard pass from Keenan Allen (Cameron Dicker kick), 5:53. Chargers 21–10. **Drive: 3 plays, 80 yards, 1:11.**
- MIN – K. J. Osborn 36-yard pass from Kirk Cousins (Greg Joseph kick), 3:01. Chargers 21–17. **Drive: 8 plays, 75 yards, 2:52.**

**Fourth quarter**

- MIN – Justin Jefferson 52-yard pass from Kirk Cousins (Greg Joseph kick), 11:20. Vikings 24–21. **Drive: 8 plays, 83 yards, 3:47.**
- LAC – Josh Palmer 30-yard pass from Justin Herbert (Cameron Dicker kick), 8:05. Chargers 28–24. **Drive: 7 plays, 75 yards, 3:15.**

**Top passers**

- LAC – Justin Herbert – 40/47, 405 yards, 3 TD
- MIN – Kirk Cousins – 32/50, 367 yards, 3 TD, INT

**Top rushers**

- LAC – Joshua Kelley – 11 rushes, 12 yards
- MIN – Alexander Mattison – 20 rushes, 93 yards

**Top receivers**

- LAC – Keenan Allen – 18 receptions, 215 yards
- MIN – Justin Jefferson – 7 receptions, 149 yards, TD

==== Week 4: vs. Las Vegas Raiders ====
Week 4: Las Vegas Raiders at Los Angeles Chargers – Game summary

Quarter	1	2	3	4	Total
Raiders	7	0	3	7	**17**
**Chargers**	7	17	0	0	**24**

at SoFi Stadium, Inglewood, California

- Date: October 1
- Game time: 1:05 p.m. PDT
- Game weather: Partly cloudy, 67 °F (19 °C) (fixed roof)
- Game attendance: 70,240
- Referee: John Hussey
- TV announcers (CBS): Kevin Harlan, Trent Green and Melanie Collins
- Recap, Game Book

Game information

**First quarter**

- LAC – Justin Herbert 12-yard run (Cameron Dicker kick), 10:38. Chargers 7–0. **Drive: 9 plays, 86 yards, 4:22.**
- LV – Aidan O'Connell 1-yard run (Daniel Carlson kick), 0:45. Tied 7–7. **Drive: 8 plays, 64 yards, 4:45.**

**Second quarter**

- LAC – Cameron Dicker 33-yard field goal, 10:42. Chargers 10–7. **Drive: 12 plays,60 yards, 5:03.**
- LAC – Keenan Allen 7-yard pass from Justin Herbert (Cameron Dicker kick), 7:20. Chargers 17–7. **Drive: 5 plays, 36 yards, 2:19.**
- LAC – Justin Herbert 1-yard run (Cameron Dicker kick), 3:05. Chargers 24–7. **Drive: 6 plays, 35 yards, 2:10.**

**Third quarter**

- LV – Daniel Carlson 22-yard field goal, 4:51. Chargers 24–10. **Drive: 13 plays, 49 yards, 6:29.**

**Fourth quarter**

- LV – Josh Jacobs 1-yard run (Daniel Carlson kick), 3:59. Chargers 24–17. **Drive: 12 plays,60 yards, 4:29.**

**Top passers**

- LV – Aidan O'Connell – 24/39, 238 yards, INT
- LAC – Justin Herbert – 13/24, 167 yards, TD, INT

**Top rushers**

- LV – Josh Jacobs – 17 rushes, 58 yards, TD
- LAC – Joshua Kelley – 17 rushes, 65 yards

**Top receivers**

- LV – Josh Jacobs – 8 receptions, 81 yards
- LAC – Joshua Palmer – 3 receptions, 77 yards

==== Week 6: vs. Dallas Cowboys ====
Week 6: Dallas Cowboys at Los Angeles Chargers – Game summary

Quarter	1	2	3	4	Total
**Cowboys**	7	3	0	10	**20**
Chargers	7	0	3	7	**17**

at SoFi Stadium, Inglewood, California

- Date: October 16
- Game time: 5:15 p.m. PDT
- Game weather: Clear, 74 °F (23 °C) (fixed roof)
- Game attendance: 70,240
- Referee: Land Clark
- TV announcers (ESPN/ABC): Joe Buck, Troy Aikman and Lisa Salters
- Recap, Game Book

Game information

**First quarter**

- LAC – Keenan Allen 1-yard pass from Justin Herbert (Cameron Dicker kick), 10:31. Chargers 7–0. **Drive: 5 plays, 42 yards, 2:23.**
- DAL – Dak Prescott 18-yard run (Brandon Aubrey kick), 6:21. Tied 7–7. **Drive: 9 plays, 75 yards, 4:10.**

**Second quarter**

- DAL – Brandon Aubrey 32-yard field goal, 0:00. Cowboys 10–7. **Drive: 6 plays, 57 yards, 0:59.**

**Third quarter**

- LAC – Cameron Dicker 24-yard field goal, 1:08. Tied 10–10. **Drive: 10 plays, 43 yards, 5:02.**

**Fourth quarter**

- DAL – Brandin Cooks 2-yard pass from Dak Prescott (Brandon Aubrey kick), 11:19. Cowboys 17–10. **Drive: 8 plays, 75 yards, 4:49.**
- LAC – Gerald Everett 1-yard pass from Justin Herbert (Cameron Dicker kick), 7:11. Tied 17–17. **Drive: 4 plays, 20 yards, 1:30.**
- DAL – Brandon Aubrey 39-yard field goal, 2:19. Cowboys 20–17. **Drive: 14 plays, 54 yards, 4:52.**

**Top passers**

- DAL – Dak Prescott – 21/30, 272 yards, TD
- LAC – Justin Herbert – 22/37, 227 yards, 2 TD, INT

**Top rushers**

- DAL – Dak Prescott – 7 rushes, 40 yards, TD
- LAC – Austin Ekeler – 14 rushes, 27 yards

**Top receivers**

- DAL – CeeDee Lamb – 7 receptions, 117 yards
- LAC – Keenan Allen – 7 receptions, 85 yards, TD

==== Week 7: at Kansas City Chiefs ====
Week 7: Los Angeles Chargers at Kansas City Chiefs – Game summary

Quarter	1	2	3	4	Total
Chargers	3	14	0	0	**17**
**Chiefs**	3	21	0	7	**31**

at Arrowhead Stadium, Kansas City, Missouri

- Date: October 22
- Game time: 3:25 p.m. CDT/1:25 p.m. PDT
- Game weather: 72 °F (22 °C)
- Game attendance: 73,642
- Referee: Tra Blake
- TV announcers (CBS): Jim Nantz, Tony Romo and Tracy Wolfson
- Recap, Game Book

Game information

**First quarter**

- KC – Harrison Butker 35-yard field goal, 6:49. Chiefs 3–0. **Drive: 11 plays, 66 yards, 5:10.**
- LAC – Cameron Dicker 55-yard field goal, 1:48. Tied 3–3. **Drive: 10 plays, 38 yards, 5:01.**

**Second quarter**

- KC – Marquez Valdes-Scantling 46-yard pass from Patrick Mahomes (Harrison Butker kick), 14:11. Chiefs 10–3. **Drive: 5 plays, 75 yards, 2:37.**
- LAC – Joshua Kelley 49-yard run (Cameron Dicker kick), 10:42. Tied 10–10. **Drive: 6 plays, 75 yards, 3:29.**
- KC – Rashee Rice 6-yard pass from Patrick Mahomes (Harrison Butker kick), 8:37. Chiefs 17–10. **Drive: 4 plays, 75 yards, 2:05.**
- LAC – Gerald Everett 7-yard pass from Justin Herbert (Cameron Dicker kick), 7:06. Tied 17–17. **Drive: 5 plays, 75 yards, 1:31.**
- KC – Travis Kelce 1-yard pass from Patrick Mahomes (Harrison Butker kick), 0:15. Chiefs 24–17. **Drive: 6 plays, 96 yards, 2:33.**

**Third quarter**

- No scoring plays.

**Fourth quarter**

- KC – Isiah Pacheco 8-yard pass from Patrick Mahomes (Harrison Butker kick), 3:30. Chiefs 31–17. **Drive: 6 plays, 35 yards, 2:46.**

**Top passers**

- LAC – Justin Herbert – 17/30, 259 yards, TD, 2 INT
- KC – Patrick Mahomes – 32/42, 424 yards, 4 TD, INT

**Top rushers**

- LAC – Joshua Kelley – 7 rushes, 75 yards, TD
- KC – Isiah Pacheco – 13 rushes, 32 yards

**Top receivers**

- LAC – Josh Palmer – 5 receptions, 133 yards
- KC – Travis Kelce – 12 receptions, 179 yards, TD

==== Week 8: vs. Chicago Bears ====
Week 8: Chicago Bears at Los Angeles Chargers – Game summary

Quarter	1	2	3	4	Total
Bears	0	7	0	6	**13**
**Chargers**	14	10	6	0	**30**

at SoFi Stadium, Inglewood, California

- Date: October 29
- Game time: 5:20 p.m. PDT
- Game weather: Clear, 76 °F (24 °C) (fixed roof)
- Game attendance: 70,240
- Referee: Brad Rogers
- TV announcers (NBC): Mike Tirico, Cris Collinsworth and Melissa Stark
- Recap, Game Book

Game information

**First quarter**

- LAC – Austin Ekeler 39-yard pass from Justin Herbert (Cameron Dicker kick), 7:08. Chargers 7–0. **Drive: 10 plays, 92 yards, 5:36.**
- LAC – Simi Fehoko 9-yard pass from Justin Herbert (Cameron Dicker kick), 0:43. Chargers 14–0. **Drive: 9 plays, 55 yards, 4:18.**

**Second quarter**

- LAC – Cameron Dicker 43-yard field goal, 8:50. Chargers 17–0. **Drive: 8 plays, 32 yards, 3:55.**
- CHI – Darrynton Evans 11-yard run (Cairo Santos kick), 1:47. Chargers 17–7. **Drive: 14 plays, 75 yards, 7:03.**
- LAC – Donald Parham 11-yard pass from Justin Herbert (Cameron Dicker kick), 0:04. Chargers 24–7. **Drive: 9 plays, 75 yards, 1:43.**

**Third quarter**

- LAC – Cameron Dicker 53-yard field goal, 8:51. Chargers 27–7. **Drive: 10 plays, 40 yards, 6:09.**
- LAC – Cameron Dicker 46-yard field goal, 3:00. Chargers 30–7. **Drive: 4 plays, 1 yard, 0:52.**

**Fourth quarter**

- CHI – Tyson Bagent 1-yard run (pass failed), 2:12. Chargers 30–13. **Drive: 10 plays, 41 yards, 4:02.**

**Top passers**

- CHI – Tyson Bagent – 25/37, 232 yards, 2 INT
- LAC – Justin Herbert – 31/40, 298 yards, 3 TD

**Top rushers**

- CHI – D'Onta Foreman – 9 rushes, 34 yards
- LAC – Austin Ekeler – 15 rushes, 29 yards

**Top receivers**

- CHI – Cole Kmet – 10 receptions, 79 yards
- LAC – Austin Ekeler – 7 receptions, 94 yards, TD

==== Week 9: at New York Jets ====
Week 9: Los Angeles Chargers at New York Jets – Game summary

Quarter	1	2	3	4	Total
**Chargers**	14	3	0	10	**27**
Jets	0	3	3	0	**6**

at MetLife Stadium, East Rutherford, New Jersey

- Date: November 6
- Game time: 8:15 p.m. EST/5:15 p.m. PST
- Game weather: Mostly cloudy, 48 °F (9 °C)
- Game attendance: 75,407
- Referee: Craig Wrolstad
- TV announcers (ESPN/ABC): Joe Buck, Troy Aikman and Lisa Salters
- Recap, Game Book

Game information

**First quarter**

- LAC – Derius Davis 87-yard punt return (Cameron Dicker kick), 13:15. Chargers 7–0.
- LAC – Austin Ekeler 1-yard run (Cameron Dicker kick), 2:45. Chargers 14–0. **Drive: 8 plays, 50 yards, 3:42.**

**Second quarter**

- NYJ – Greg Zuerlein 47-yard field goal, 5:57. Chargers 14–3. **Drive: 7 plays, 26 yards, 3:23.**
- LAC – Cameron Dicker 55-yard field goal, 0:00. Chargers 17–3. **Drive: 3 plays, 21 yards, 0:07.**

**Third quarter**

- NYJ – Greg Zuerlein 46-yard field goal, 9:52. Chargers 17–6. **Drive: 9 plays, 47 yards, 5:08.**

**Fourth quarter**

- LAC – Cameron Dicker 38-yard field goal, 9:18. Chargers 20–6. **Drive: 16 plays, 68 yards, 8:17.**
- LAC – Austin Ekeler 2-yard run (Cameron Dicker kick), 3:22. Chargers 27–6. **Drive: 1 play, 2 yards, 0:06.**

**Top passers**

- LAC – Justin Herbert – 16/30, 136 yards
- NYJ – Zach Wilson – 33/49, 263 yards

**Top rushers**

- LAC – Austin Ekeler – 14 rushes, 47 yards, 2 TD
- NYJ – Breece Hall – 16 rushes, 50 yards

**Top receivers**

- LAC – Keenan Allen – 8 receptions, 77 yards
- NYJ – Garrett Wilson – 7 receptions, 80 yards

==== Week 10: vs. Detroit Lions ====
Week 10: Detroit Lions at Los Angeles Chargers – Game summary

Quarter	1	2	3	4	Total
**Lions**	10	14	7	10	**41**
Chargers	3	14	7	14	**38**

at SoFi Stadium, Inglewood, California

- Date: November 12
- Game time: 1:05 p.m. PST
- Game weather: Sunny, 79 °F (26 °C) (fixed roof)
- Game attendance: 70,240
- Referee: Shawn Smith
- TV announcers (CBS): Jim Nantz, Tony Romo and Tracy Wolfson
- Recap, Game Book

Game information

**First quarter**

- DET – Riley Patterson 33-yard field goal, 10:09. Lions 3–0. **Drive: 7 plays, 61 yards, 3:23.**
- LAC – Cameron Dicker 48-yard field goal, 6:54. Tied 3–3. **Drive: 8 plays, 45 yards, 3:15.**
- DET – Jahmyr Gibbs 1-yard run (Riley Patterson kick), 4:18. Lions 10–3. **Drive: 5 plays, 75 yards, 2:36.**

**Second quarter**

- DET – Jahmyr Gibbs 1-yard run (Riley Patterson kick), 7:30. Lions 17–3. **Drive: 9 plays, 60 yards, 4:47.**
- LAC – Keenan Allen 29-yard pass from Justin Herbert (Cameron Dicker kick), 3:21. Lions 17–10. **Drive: 10 plays, 75 yards, 4:09.**
- DET – David Montgomery 75-yard run (Riley Patterson kick), 3:21. Lions 24–10. **Drive: 1 play, 75 yards, 0:14.**
- LAC – Austin Ekeler 2-yard run (Cameron Dicker kick), 0:23. Lions 24–17. **Drive: 10 plays, 75 yards, 2:44.**

**Third quarter**

- LAC – Jalen Guyton 18-yard pass from Justin Herbert (Cameron Dicker kick), 7:59. Tied 24–24. **Drive: 10 plays, 92 yards, 4:28.**
- DET – Amon-Ra St. Brown 20-yard pass from Jared Goff (Riley Patterson kick), 4:31. Lions 31–24. **Drive: 7 plays, 75 yards, 3:28.**

**Fourth quarter**

- LAC – Quentin Johnston 1-yard pass from Justin Herbert (Cameron Dicker kick), 11:30. Tied 31–31. **Drive: 16 plays, 75 yards, 8:01.**
- DET – Brock Wright 25-yard pass from Jared Goff (Riley Patterson kick), 7:30. Lions 38–31. **Drive: 7 plays, 75 yards, 4:00.**
- LAC – Keenan Allen 38-yard pass from Justin Herbert (Cameron Dicker kick), 3:34. Tied 38–38. **Drive: 7 plays, 68 yards, 3:56.**
- DET – Riley Patterson 41-yard field goal, 0:00. Lions 41–38. **Drive: 9 plays, 53 yards, 3:34.**

**Top passers**

- DET – Jared Goff – 23/33, 333 yards, 2 TD
- LAC – Justin Herbert – 27/40, 323 yards, 4 TD, INT

**Top rushers**

- DET – David Montgomery – 12 rushes, 116 yards, TD
- LAC – Austin Ekeler – 19 rushes, 67 yards, TD

**Top receivers**

- DET – Amon-Ra St. Brown – 8 receptions, 156 yards, TD
- LAC – Keenan Allen – 11 receptions, 175 yards, 2 TD

The Chargers recorded their first home loss to the Lions, ending a five-game home winning streak against them.

==== Week 11: at Green Bay Packers ====
Week 11: Los Angeles Chargers at Green Bay Packers – Game summary

Quarter	1	2	3	4	Total
Chargers	3	7	3	7	**20**
**Packers**	0	10	6	7	**23**

at Lambeau Field, Green Bay, Wisconsin

- Date: November 19
- Game time: 12:00 p.m. CST/10:00 a.m. PST
- Game weather: Sunny, 45 °F (7 °C)
- Game attendance: 77,432
- Referee: John Hussey
- TV announcers (Fox): Kevin Kugler, Mark Sanchez and Laura Okmin
- Recap, Game Book

Game information

**First quarter**

- LAC – Cameron Dicker 25-yard field goal, 1:22. Chargers 3–0. **Drive: 12 plays, 79 yards, 6:38.**

**Second quarter**

- GB – Jarran Reed 32-yard run (Anders Carlson kick), 14:53. Packers 7–3. **Drive: 6 plays, 69 yards, 1:29.**
- LAC – Stone Smartt 51-yard pass from Justin Herbert (Cameron Dicker kick), 12:16. Chargers 10–7. **Drive: 6 plays, 75 yards, 2:37.**
- GB – Anders Carlson 28-yard field goal, 0:07. Tied 10–10. **Drive: 16 plays, 71 yards, 5:44.**

**Third quarter**

- LAC – Cameron Dicker 26-yard field goal, 10:44. Chargers 13–10. **Drive: 10 plays, 71 yards, 4:16.**
- GB – Christian Watson 11-yard pass from Jordan Love (kick failed), 0:04. Packers 16–13. **Drive: 5 plays, 70 yards, 2:21.**

**Fourth quarter**

- LAC – Keenan Allen 10-yard pass from Justin Herbert (Cameron Dicker kick), 5:24. Chargers 20–16. **Drive: 11 plays, 63 yards, 5:36.**
- GB – Romeo Doubs 24-yard pass from Jordan Love (Anders Carlson kick), 2:33. Packers 23–20. **Drive: 6 plays, 75 yards, 2:51.**

**Top passers**

- LAC – Justin Herbert – 21/36, 260 yards, 2 TD
- GB – Jordan Love – 27/40, 322 yards, 2 TD

**Top rushers**

- LAC – Justin Herbert – 8 rushes, 73 yards
- GB – Jayden Reed – 3 rushes, 46 yards, TD

**Top receivers**

- LAC – Keenan Allen – 10 receptions, 116 yards, TD
- GB – Romeo Doubs – 5 receptions, 53 yards, TD

==== Week 12: vs. Baltimore Ravens ====
Week 12: Baltimore Ravens at Los Angeles Chargers – Game summary

Quarter	1	2	3	4	Total
**Ravens**	0	10	3	7	**20**
Chargers	3	0	0	7	**10**

at SoFi Stadium, Inglewood, California

- Date: November 26
- Game time: 5:20 p.m. PST
- Game weather: 64 °F (18 °C) (fixed roof)
- Game attendance: 70,240
- Referee: Alan Eck
- TV announcers (NBC): Mike Tirico, Jason Garrett and Melissa Stark
- Recap, Game Book

Game information

**First quarter**

- LAC – Cameron Dicker 39-yard field goal, 9:03. Chargers 3–0. **Drive: 12 plays, 54 yards, 5:57.**

**Second quarter**

- BAL – Zay Flowers 3-yard pass from Lamar Jackson (Justin Tucker kick), 10:41. Ravens 7–3. **Drive: 12 plays, 78 yards, 6:21.**
- BAL – Justin Tucker 42-yard field goal, 1:12. Ravens 10–3. **Drive: 5 plays, 10 yards, 2:21.**

**Third quarter**

- BAL – Justin Tucker 48-yard field goal, 10:53. Ravens 13–3. **Drive: 9 plays, 45 yards, 4:07.**

**Fourth quarter**

- LAC – Gerald Everett 3-yard pass from Justin Herbert (Cameron Dicker kick), 8:32. Ravens 13–10. **Drive: 7 plays, 60 yards, 2:51.**
- BAL – Zay Flowers 37-yard run (Justin Tucker kick), 1:36. Ravens 20–10. **Drive: 3 plays, 44 yards, 0:18.**

**Top passers**

- BAL – Lamar Jackson – 18/32, 177 yards, TD
- LAC – Justin Herbert – 29/44, 217 yards, TD, INT

**Top rushers**

- BAL – Keaton Mitchell – 9 rushes, 64 yards
- LAC – Justin Herbert – 4 rushes, 47 yards

**Top receivers**

- BAL – Isaiah Likely – 4 receptions, 40 yards
- LAC – Keenan Allen – 14 rushes, 106 yards

==== Week 13: at New England Patriots ====
Week 13: Los Angeles Chargers at New England Patriots – Game summary

Quarter	1	2	3	4	Total
**Chargers**	0	6	0	0	**6**
Patriots	0	0	0	0	**0**

at Gillette Stadium, Foxborough, Massachusetts

- Date: December 3
- Game time: 1:00 p.m. EST/10:00 a.m. PST
- Game weather: Rain, 44 °F (7 °C)
- Game attendance: 64,628
- Referee: Bill Vinovich
- TV announcers (CBS): Spero Dedes, Adam Archuleta and Aditi Kinkhabwala
- Recap, Game Book

Game information

**First quarter**

- No scoring plays.

**Second quarter**

- LAC – Cameron Dicker 38-yard field goal, 9:09. Chargers 3–0. **Drive: 7 plays, 27 yards, 2:26.**
- LAC – Cameron Dicker 38-yard field goal, 0:44. Chargers 6–0. **Drive: 4 plays, 7 yards, 0:50.**

**Third quarter**

- No scoring plays.

**Fourth quarter**

- No scoring plays.

**Top passers**

- LAC – Justin Herbert – 22/37, 212 yards
- NE – Bailey Zappe – 13/25, 141 yards

**Top rushers**

- LAC – Austin Ekeler – 14 rushes, 18 yards
- NE – Ezekiel Elliott – 17 rushes, 52 yards

**Top receivers**

- LAC – Keenan Allen – 5 receptions, 58 yards
- NE – DeVante Parker – 4 rushes, 64 yards

The Chargers defeated the Patriots for the first time since 2008, and in New England for the first time since 2005.

==== Week 14: vs. Denver Broncos ====
Week 14: Denver Broncos at Los Angeles Chargers – Game summary

Quarter	1	2	3	4	Total
**Broncos**	7	3	7	7	**24**
Chargers	0	0	0	7	**7**

at SoFi Stadium, Inglewood, California

- Date: December 10
- Game time: 1:25 p.m. PST
- Game weather: Clear, 75 °F (24 °C) (fixed roof)
- Game attendance: 70,240
- Referee: Clete Blakeman
- TV announcers (CBS): Andrew Catalon, Tiki Barber, Matt Ryan and AJ Ross
- Recap, Game Book

Game information

**First quarter**

- DEN – Javonte Williams 3-yard run (Wil Lutz kick), 4:55. Broncos 7–0. **Drive: 1 play, 3 yards, 0:05.**

**Second quarter**

- DEN – Wil Lutz 23-yard field goal, 0:05. Broncos 10–0. **Drive: 10 plays, 65 yards, 1:23.**

**Third quarter**

- DEN – Courtland Sutton 46-yard pass from Russell Wilson (Wil Lutz kick), 5:55. Broncos 17–0. **Drive: 4 plays, 60 yards, 2:12.**

**Fourth quarter**

- LAC – Austin Ekeler 3-yard run (Cameron Dicker kick), 10:37. Broncos 17–7. **Drive: 5 plays, 94 yards, 1:44.**
- DEN – Adam Trautman 10-yard pass from Russell Wilson (Wil Lutz kick), 3:11. Broncos 24–7. **Drive: 13 plays, 75 yards, 7:26.**

**Top passers**

- DEN – Russell Wilson – 21/33, 224 yards, 2 TD, INT
- LAC – Easton Stick – 13/24, 179 yards

**Top rushers**

- DEN – Javonte Williams – 17 rushes, 66 yards, TD
- LAC – Austin Ekeler – 10 rushes, 51 yards, TD

**Top receivers**

- DEN – Courtland Sutton – 3 receptions, 62 yards, TD
- LAC – Quentin Johnston – 3 receptions, 91 yards

In addition to losing the game, the Chargers lost quarterback Justin Herbert for the rest of the season to a finger injury in the 2nd quarter. This was the last game Keenan Allen played for the team as he was traded in the 2024 off-season.

==== Week 15: at Las Vegas Raiders ====
Week 15: Los Angeles Chargers at Las Vegas Raiders – Game summary

Quarter	1	2	3	4	Total
Chargers	0	0	7	14	**21**
**Raiders**	21	21	14	7	**63**

at Allegiant Stadium, Paradise, Nevada

- Date: December 14
- Game time: 5:15 p.m. PST
- Game weather: None (indoor stadium)
- Game attendance: 61,654
- Referee: Ronald Torbert
- TV announcers (KTTV/Prime Video): Al Michaels, Kirk Herbstreit and Kaylee Hartung
- Recap, Game Book

Game information

**First quarter**

- LV – Zamir White 1-yard run (Daniel Carlson kick), 8:10. Raiders 7–0. **Drive: 12 plays, 68 yards, 5:23.**
- LV – Tre Tucker 30-yard pass from Aidan O'Connell (Daniel Carlson kick), 4:41. Raiders 14–0. **Drive: 4 plays, 42 yards, 1:26.**
- LV – Jakobi Meyers 22-yard pass from Aidan O'Connell (Daniel Carlson kick), 3:07. Raiders 21–0. **Drive: 3 plays, 31 yards, 1:29.**

**Second quarter**

- LV – Michael Mayer 11-yard pass from Aidan O'Connell (Daniel Carlson kick), 9:15. Raiders 28–0. **Drive: 2 plays, 14 yards, 0:29.**
- LV – Brandon Bolden 26-yard run (Daniel Carlson kick), 3:50. Raiders 35–0. **Drive: 6 plays, 65 yards, 3:31.**
- LV – Tre Tucker 20-yard pass from Aidan O'Connell (Daniel Carlson kick), 0:31. Raiders 42–0. **Drive: 6 plays, 49 yards, 1:25.**

**Third quarter**

- LV – Davante Adams 3-yard pass from Jakobi Meyers (Daniel Carlson kick), 10:42. Raiders 49–0. **Drive: 9 plays, 75 yards, 4:18.**
- LAC – Josh Palmer 79-yard pass from Easton Stick (Cameron Dicker kick), 10:27. Raiders 49–7. **Drive: 1 play, 79 yards, 0:15.**
- LV – John Jenkins 44-yard fumble return (Daniel Carlson kick), 0:00. Raiders 56–7.

**Fourth quarter**

- LV – Jack Jones 16-yard interception return (Daniel Carlson kick), 14:31. Raiders 63–7.
- LAC – Alex Erickson 13-yard pass from Easton Stick (Cameron Dicker kick), 8:39. Raiders 63–14. **Drive: 11 plays, 75 yards, 5:52.**
- LAC – Quentin Johnston 6-yard pass from Easton Stick (Cameron Dicker kick), 2:38. Raiders 63–21. **Drive: 10 plays, 55 yards, 4:15.**

**Top passers**

- LAC – Easton Stick – 23/32, 257 yards, 3 TD, INT
- LV – Aidan O'Connell – 20/34, 248 yards, 4 TD

**Top rushers**

- LAC – Isaiah Spiller – 16 rushes, 50 yards
- LV – Zamir White – 17 rushes, 69 yards, TD

**Top receivers**

- LAC – Josh Palmer – 4 receptions, 113 yards, TD
- LV – Davante Adams – 8 receptions, 101 yards, TD

The Chargers suffered one of the worst losses in franchise history, as the Raiders set a franchise record for most points scored in a game just four days after being shut out. The Chargers turned the ball over five times and allowed 35 points off turnovers. The day after the game, the Chargers fired head coach Brandon Staley and general manager Tom Telesco. They extended their losing streak in Las Vegas to 3 games.

==== Week 16: vs. Buffalo Bills ====
Week 16: Buffalo Bills at Los Angeles Chargers – Game summary

Quarter	1	2	3	4	Total
**Bills**	0	14	7	3	**24**
Chargers	3	7	3	9	**22**

at SoFi Stadium, Inglewood, California

- Date: December 23
- Game time: 5:00 p.m. PST
- Game weather: Cloudy, 62 °F (17 °C) (fixed roof)
- Game attendance: 67,678
- Referee: Adrian Hill
- TV announcers (Peacock): Mike Tirico, Cris Collinsworth and Melissa Stark
- Recap, Game Book

Game information

**First quarter**

- LAC – Cameron Dicker 20-yard field goal, 6:32. Chargers 3–0. **Drive: 14 plays, 90 yards, 6:32.**

**Second quarter**

- LAC – Easton Stick 1-yard run (Cameron Dicker kick), 13:49. Chargers 10–0. **Drive: 4 plays, 27 yards, 1:15.**
- BUF – Gabe Davis 57-yard pass from Josh Allen (Tyler Bass kick), 9:02. Chargers 10–7. **Drive: 1 play, 57 yards, 0:10.**
- BUF – Josh Allen 2-yard run (Tyler Bass kick), 0:38. Bills 14–10. **Drive: 8 plays, 63 yards, 3:51.**

**Third quarter**

- LAC – Cameron Dicker 40-yard field goal, 7:22. Bills 14–13. **Drive: 8 plays, 36 yards, 4:46.**
- BUF – Josh Allen 1-yard run (Tyler Bass kick), 1:28. Bills 21–13. **Drive: 10 plays, 75 yards, 5:54.**

**Fourth quarter**

- LAC – Cameron Dicker 47-yard field goal, 12:36. Bills 21–16. **Drive: 11 plays, 46 yards, 3:52.**
- LAC – Cameron Dicker 45-yard field goal, 7:19. Bills 21–19. **Drive: 6 plays, 21 yards, 1:57.**
- LAC – Cameron Dicker 53-yard field goal, 5:26. Chargers 22–21. **Drive: 4 plays, −3 yards, 1:44.**
- BUF – Tyler Bass 29-yard field goal, 0:28. Bills 24–22. **Drive: 13 plays, 64 yards, 4:58.**

**Top passers**

- BUF – Josh Allen – 15/21, 237 yards, TD, INT
- LAC – Easton Stick – 23/33, 215 yards

**Top rushers**

- BUF – James Cook – 20 rushes, 70 yards
- LAC – Austin Ekeler – 15 rushes, 65 yards

**Top receivers**

- BUF – Gabe Davis – 4 receptions, 130 yards, TD
- LAC – Josh Palmer – 5 receptions, 47 yards

With this loss, the Chargers were eliminated from playoff contention. It was the first time the Chargers lost to Buffalo at home since 1981, when they were still in San Diego, and their first loss to the Bills in Los Angeles since 1960.

==== Week 17: at Denver Broncos ====
Week 17: Los Angeles Chargers at Denver Broncos – Game summary

Quarter	1	2	3	4	Total
Chargers	0	3	3	3	**9**
**Broncos**	3	10	0	3	**16**

at Mile High Stadium, Denver, Colorado

- Date: December 31
- Game time: 2:25 p.m. MST/1:25 p.m. PST
- Game weather: Mostly cloudy, 41 °F (5 °C)
- Game attendance: 76,228
- Referee: Craig Wrolstad
- TV announcers (CBS): Tom McCarthy, James Lofton, Jay Feely and Tiffany Blackmon
- Recap, Game Book

Game information

**First quarter**

- DEN – Wil Lutz 32-yard field goal, 3:55. Broncos 3–0. **Drive: 11 plays, 53 yards, 5:49.**

**Second quarter**

- LAC – Cameron Dicker 36-yard field goal, 9:43. Tied 3–3. **Drive: 8 plays, 42 yards, 3:32.**
- DEN – Lil'Jordan Humphrey 54-yard pass from Jarrett Stidham (Wil Lutz kick), 6:37. Broncos 10–3. **Drive: 6 plays, 75 yards, 3:06.**
- DEN – Wil Lutz 43-yard field goal, 1:53. Broncos 13–3. **Drive: 6 plays, 17 yards, 0:58.**

**Third quarter**

- LAC – Cameron Dicker 50-yard field goal, 6:20. Broncos 13–6. **Drive: 9 plays, 58 yards, 4:27.**

**Fourth quarter**

- DEN – Wil Lutz 20-yard field goal, 11:19. Broncos 16–6. **Drive: 7 plays, 36 yards, 3:34.**
- LAC – Cameron Dicker 52-yard field goal, 1:17. Broncos 16–9. **Drive: 9 plays, 46 yards, 1:42.**

**Top passers**

- LAC – Easton Stick – 24/38, 220 yards
- DEN – Jason Stidham – 20/32, 224 yards, TD

**Top rushers**

- LAC – Austin Ekeler – 13 rushes, 46 yards
- DEN – Jaleel McLaughlin – 8 rushes, 44 yards

**Top receivers**

- LAC – Alex Erickson – 7 receptions, 98 yards
- DEN – Brandon Johnson – 4 receptions, 27 yards

With the loss, the Chargers were swept by the Broncos for the first time since 2019.

==== Week 18: vs. Kansas City Chiefs ====
Week 18: Kansas City Chiefs at Los Angeles Chargers – Game summary

Quarter	1	2	3	4	Total
**Chiefs**	7	3	0	3	**13**
Chargers	0	6	3	3	**12**

at SoFi Stadium, Inglewood, California

- Date: January 7
- Game time: 1:25 p.m. PST
- Game weather: Clear, 57 °F (14 °C) (fixed roof)
- Game attendance: 68,274
- Referee: Scott Novak
- TV announcers (CBS): Spero Dedes, Adam Archuleta, and Aditi Kinkhabwala
- Recap, Game Book

Game information

**First quarter**

- KC – Mike Edwards 97-yard fumble return (Harrison Butker kick), 4:56. Chiefs 7–0.

**Second quarter**

- KC – Harrison Butker 22-yard field goal, 4:03. Chiefs 10–0. **Drive: 12 plays, 66 yards, 5:35.**
- LAC – Cameron Dicker 49-yard field goal, 2:43. Chiefs 10–3. **Drive: 5 plays, 44 yards, 1:20.**
- LAC – Cameron Dicker 40-yard field goal, 0:00. Chiefs 10–6. **Drive: 9 plays, 66 yards, 1:24.**

**Third quarter**

- LAC – Cameron Dicker 43-yard field goal, 4:11. Chiefs 10–9. **Drive: 12 plays, 60 yards, 5:59.**

**Fourth quarter**

- LAC – Cameron Dicker 20-yard field goal, 4:06. Chargers 12–10. **Drive: 18 plays, 84 yards, 6:49.**
- KC – Harrison Butker 41-yard field goal, 0:49. Chiefs 13–12. **Drive: 9 plays, 51 yards, 3:17.**

**Top passers**

- KC – Blaine Gabbert – 15/30, 154 yards, INT
- LAC – Easton Stick – 28/47, 258 yards

**Top rushers**

- KC – La'Mical Perine – 21 rushes, 76 yards
- LAC – Easton Stick – 13 rushes, 77 yards

**Top receivers**

- KC – Mecole Hardman – 6 receptions, 77 yards
- LAC – Donald Parham – 5 receptions, 83 yards

=== Standings ===
==== Division ====
AFC West
	W	L	T	PCT	DIV	CONF	PF	PA	STK
^{(3)} Kansas City Chiefs	11	6	0	.647	4–2	9–3	371	294	W2
Las Vegas Raiders	8	9	0	.471	4–2	6–6	332	331	W1
Denver Broncos	8	9	0	.471	3–3	5–7	357	413	L1
Los Angeles Chargers	5	12	0	.294	1–5	3–9	346	398	L5

==== Conference ====
AFC
#	Team	Division	W	L	T	PCT	DIV	CONF	SOS	SOV	STK
**Division leaders**
1	Baltimore Ravens	North	13	4	0	.765	3–3	8–4	.543	.529	L1
2 (Note: Buffalo claimed the No. 2 seed over Kansas City based on head-to-head victory.) (Note: Buffalo finished ahead of Miami in the AFC East based on head-to-head sweep.)	Buffalo Bills	East	11	6	0	.647	4–2	7–5	.471	.471	W5
3	Kansas City Chiefs	West	11	6	0	.647	4–2	9–3	.481	.428	W2
4	Houston Texans	South	10	7	0	.588	4–2	7–5	.474	.465	W2
**Wild cards**
5 (Note: Cleveland claimed the No. 5 seed over Miami based on conference record.)	Cleveland Browns	North	11	6	0	.647	3–3	8–4	.536	.513	L1
6	Miami Dolphins	East	11	6	0	.647	4–2	7–5	.450	.358	L2
7	Pittsburgh Steelers	North	10	7	0	.588	5–1	7–5	.540	.571	W3
**Did not qualify for the postseason**
8 (Note: Cincinnati finished ahead of Jacksonville based on head-to-head victory. Division tie break was initially used to eliminate Indianapolis (see below).)	Cincinnati Bengals	North	9	8	0	.529	1–5	4–8	.574	.536	W1
9 (Note: Jacksonville finished ahead of Indianapolis based on head-to-head sweep.)	Jacksonville Jaguars	South	9	8	0	.529	4–2	6–6	.533	.477	L1
10	Indianapolis Colts	South	9	8	0	.529	3–3	7–5	.491	.444	L1
11 (Note: Las Vegas finished ahead of Denver based on head-to-head sweep.)	Las Vegas Raiders	West	8	9	0	.471	4–2	6–6	.488	.426	W1
12	Denver Broncos	West	8	9	0	.471	3–3	5–7	.488	.485	L1
13	New York Jets	East	7	10	0	.412	2–4	4–8	.502	.454	W1
14	Tennessee Titans	South	6	11	0	.353	1–5	4–8	.522	.422	W1
15	Los Angeles Chargers	West	5	12	0	.294	1–5	3–9	.529	.388	L5
16	New England Patriots	East	4	13	0	.235	2–4	4–8	.522	.529	L2
**Tiebreakers** (Note: When breaking ties for three or more teams under the NFL's rules, they are first broken within divisions, then comparing only the highest ranked remaining team from each division.)
