= List of Los Angeles Chargers head coaches =

The Los Angeles Chargers are a professional American football team based in the Greater Los Angeles area. The Chargers compete in the National Football League (NFL) as a member club of the league's American Football Conference (AFC) West division. Their stadium is located in Inglewood, California. There have been 18 coaches in San Diego and Los Angeles franchise history, including Sid Gillman, who coached the Los Angeles Chargers' first and only season in 1960 before the team's move to San Diego in 1961. The current head coach is Jim Harbaugh, who was hired on January 24, 2024. Harbaugh replaced Giff Smith, who served as interim head coach after the firing of Brandon Staley in the 2023 season.

== History ==
Sid Gillman coached the Los Angeles and San Diego Chargers to five Western Division titles and one league championship in the first six years of the league's existence.

His greatest coaching success came after he was persuaded by Barron Hilton, then the Chargers' majority owner, to become the head coach of the American Football League franchise he planned to operate in Los Angeles. When the team's general manager, Frank Leahy, became ill during the Chargers' founding season, Gillman took on additional responsibilities as general manager.

As the first coach of the Chargers, Gillman gave the team a personality that matched his own. Gillman's concepts formed the foundation of the so-called "West Coast offense" that pro football teams are still using. He coached the Los Angeles and San Diego Chargers to five Western Division titles and one league championship in the first six years of the league's existence.

He played college football at Ohio State University under legendary coach Francis "Shut the Gates of Mercy" Schmidt, forming the basis of his "West Coast offense." The term "West Coast Offense," as it is now commonly used, derives from a 1993 Bernie Kosar quote, publicized by Sports Illustrated writer Paul Zimmerman (or "Dr. Z"). Originally the term referred to the "Air Coryell" system used by two west coast teams beginning in the 1970s, the San Diego Chargers and Oakland Raiders. However, a reporter mistakenly applied Kosar's quote about the Air Coryell system to the 1980s-era attack of Walsh's San Francisco 49ers. Initially, Walsh resisted having the term misapplied to his own distinct system, but the moniker stuck. Now the term is also commonly used to refer to pass-offenses that may not be closely related to either the Air Coryell system or Walsh's pass-strategy.

Don Coryell coached the San Diego Chargers from 1978 to 1986. He is well known for his innovations to football's passing offense. Coryell's offense today is commonly known as "Air Coryell". However, the Charger offense lacked the ability to control the clock, resulting in their defense spending too much time on the field. As a result, they fell short of getting to the Super Bowl. He was inducted into the Chargers Hall of Fame in 1986. Coryell is a member of the College Football Hall of Fame. He did not use a playbook.

Al Saunders was the coach for the Chargers from 1986 to 1988 and became a citizen of the United States in 1960, one of the four foreign-born coaches in the NFL. In college played Defensive back and Wide receiver for the Spartans of San Jose State University (SJSU) from 1966 to 1968 where he was a three-year starter, team captain, and an Academic All-American.

In the 1970s, Al Saunders joined the coaching staff at USC and San Diego State University (SDSU), whose SDSU Aztecs were then under the control of Head Coach Don Coryell. Saunders would go with Coryell to NFL when Coryell became the head coach of the San Diego Chargers. Statistics correct as of December 30, 2007, after the end of the 2007 NFL season.

Bobby Ross coached the Chargers from 1992 to 1996, and is the only coach to win awards while coaching the Chargers. In 1992, Ross won the Pro Football Weekly NFL Coach of the Year, the Maxwell Football Club NFL Coach of the Year and the UPI NFL Coach of the Year. The Pro Football Weekly NFL Coach of the Year is presented annually by various news and sports organizations to the National Football League (NFL) head coach who has done the most outstanding job of working with the talent he has at his disposal. The Maxwell Football Club NFL Coach of the Year was created in 1989 and is originally titled the Earle "Greasy" Neale Award for Professional Coach of the Year. The United Press International (UPI) NFL Coach of the Year award was first presented in 1955. Before the AFL-NFL merger, an award was also given to the most outstanding coach from the AFL. When the leagues merged in 1970, separate awards were given to the best coaches from the AFC and NFC conferences. The UPI discontinued the awards after 1996.

The San Diego Chargers hired Schottenheimer as their 13th head coach on January 29, 2002. Schottenheimer posted a 47–33 record (.588) with the Chargers. His success did not come immediately, as the team posted a 4–12 record in 2003, thereby "earning" the first overall pick in the draft (this was the last time that a team with the worst record in the NFL kept its head coach the following season, even considering the three other 4–12 teams that season replaced their head coaches, Oakland, Arizona, and the New York Giants hiring Norv Turner, Dennis Green, and Tom Coughlin, respectively). He was named NFL Coach Of The Year for the 2004 NFL season. Schottenheimer led the team to two playoff appearances, his 17th and 18th as a head coach. However, both appearances resulted in disappointing losses to the underdog New York Jets in overtime in 2005 and the New England Patriots in 2007, bringing his playoff record to 5–13. Schottenheimer was abruptly fired by San Diego on February 12, 2007. Schottenheimer was fired because of a strained relationship with general manager A. J. Smith, which reached a breaking point when four assistants (Cam Cameron, Wade Phillips, Rob Chudzinski and Greg Manusky) left for positions with other teams.

Bobby Ross holds the best record percentage wise in the playoffs. Norv Turner holds the best regular season coaching record, with 0.640, followed by Hall of Famer Sid Gillman with 0.608. Ron Waller holds the worst regular season record, winning just one out of the six games he coached.

== Key ==
#	Number of coaches
GC	Games coached
W	Wins
L	Losses
T	Ties
Win%	Winning percentage
†	Elected into the Pro Football Hall of Fame as a coach
‡	Elected into the Pro Football Hall of Fame as a player
*	Spent entire NFL head coaching career with the Chargers

== Coaches ==
Note: Statistics are correct through the end of the 2025 NFL season regular season.

#	Image	Name	Term	Regular season					Playoffs			Awards	Reference
#	Image	Name	Term	GC	W	L	T	Win%	GC	W	L	Awards	Reference
Los Angeles Chargers
1		Sid Gillman†	1960	14	10	4	0	.714	1	0	1		
San Diego Chargers
–		Sid Gillman†	1961–1969, 1971	131	76	49	6	.603	4	1	3		
2		Charlie Waller*	1969–1970*	19	9	7	3	.553	–	–	–		
3		Harland Svare	1971 –1973	26	7	17	2	.308	–	–	–		
4		Ron Waller*	1973*	6	1	5	0	.167	–	–	–		
5		Tommy Prothro	1974–1978	60	21	39	0	.350	–	–	–		
6		Don Coryell†	1978–1986	125	69	56	0	.552	7	3	4		
7		Al Saunders*	1986–1988*	39	17	22	0	.436	–	–	–		
8		Dan Henning	1989–1991	48	16	32	0	.333	–	–	–		
9		Bobby Ross	1992–1996	80	47	33	0	.588	6	3	3	Pro Football Weekly NFL Coach of the Year (1992) Maxwell Football Club NFL Coach of the Year (1992); UPI NFL Coach of the Year (1992)	
10		Kevin Gilbride*	1997–1998*	22	6	16	0	.273	–	–	–		
11		June Jones	1998	10	3	7	0	.300	–	–	–		
12		Mike Riley*	1999–2001*	48	14	34	0	.292	–	–	–		
13		Marty Schottenheimer	2002–2006	80	47	33	0	.588	2	0	2		
14		Norv Turner	2007–2012	96	56	40	0	.583	6	3	3		
15		Mike McCoy	2013–2016	64	27	37	0	.422	2	1	1		
Los Angeles Chargers
16		Anthony Lynn	2017–2020	64	33	31	0	.516	2	1	1		
17		Brandon Staley*	2021–2023	48	24	24	0	.500	1	0	1		
18		Giff Smith*	2023	3	0	3	0	.000	–	–	–		
19		Jim Harbaugh	2024–present	34	22	12	0	.647	2	0	2		
