= Chargers–Raiders rivalry =

National Football League rivalry

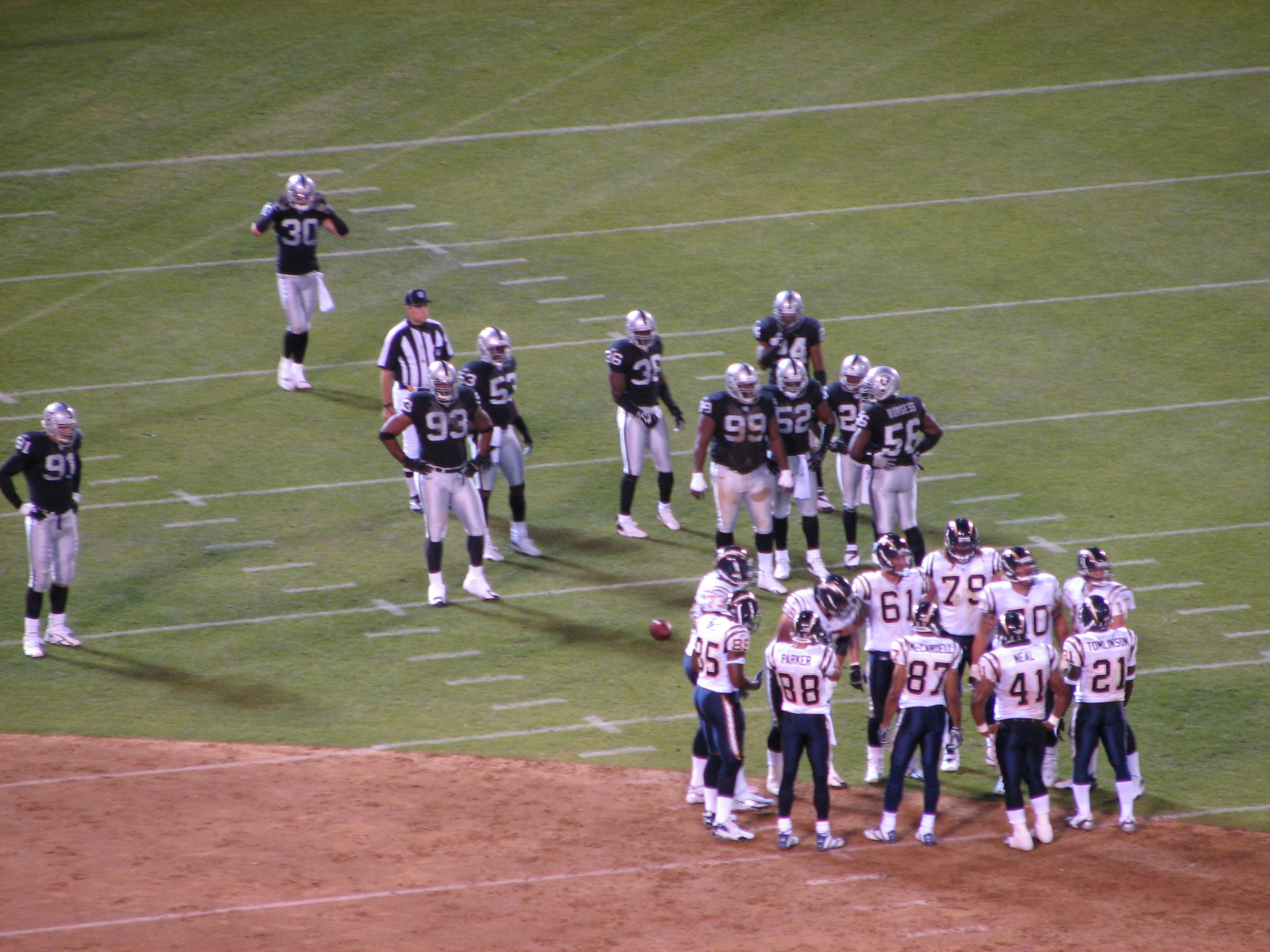
- Chargers and Raiders face off during the 2006 season.

- Los Angeles Chargers Las Vegas Raiders
- Location: Los Angeles, Las Vegas
- First meeting: November 27, 1960; Chargers 52, Raiders 28
- Latest meeting: September 20, 2026; Raiders 26, Chargers 14
- Next meeting: December 13, 2026
- Stadiums: Chargers: SoFi Stadium; Raiders: Allegiant Stadium

Statistics
- Total meetings: 134
- All-time series: Raiders: 70–62–2
- Regular season series: Raiders: 69–62–2
- Postseason results: Raiders: 1–0
- Largest victory: Chargers: 44–0 (1961); Raiders: 63–21 (2023)
- Most points scored: Chargers: 55 (1981); Raiders: 63 (2023)
- Longest win streak: Chargers: 13 (2003–2009); Raiders: 10 (1972–1977)
- Current win streak: Raiders: 1 (2026–present)

Post-season history
- 1980 AFC Championship: Raiders won: 34–27

The Chargers–Raiders rivalry is a National Football League (NFL) rivalry between the Los Angeles Chargers and Las Vegas Raiders.

The rivalry has existed in two leagues and through a combined five moves. The teams debuted in the inaugural AFL season, in 1960, as the Oakland Raiders and Los Angeles Chargers in the AFL Western Conference; a decade later, both teams joined the AFC West under the AFL–NFL merger.

Like the 49ers–Rams rivalry in the NFC West, this rivalry represented the geographic and cultural differences between Northern and Southern California, with the Raiders representing Oakland from 1960–1981, and again from 1995–2019, and the Chargers represented San Diego from 1961–2016, and Los Angeles in 1960, and since 2017. The Raiders' 13 seasons in Los Angeles, from 1982 to 1994, saw the teams only 130 miles apart. The in-state rivalry has been lost with the Raiders' move to Nevada, though Las Vegas is closer to Los Angeles by 350 miles than Oakland to San Diego.

The Raiders lead the overall series, 70–62–2. The Raiders won the teams' lone playoff meeting.

== History ==
Locations of the Chargers and Raiders throughout the years.

=== 1960–1969: AFL days ===
Both the Chargers and Raiders were charter members of the American Football League when the league began playing in 1960. The Chargers moved to San Diego after their first year in Los Angeles, appearing in four of the first five AFL Championship games and winning one. Al Davis, who would later become the famous Raiders owner, started off as an assistant coach for the Chargers until becoming Oakland's head coach in 1963. Under Davis, the Raiders held a competitive edge over the Chargers from the late 1960s to the 1990s, appearing in four Super Bowls and winning three of them.

=== 1970–2014 ===
In 1978, the Raiders won over the Chargers in San Diego with a controversial fumblerooski play later dubbed the Holy Roller. The loss helped the Chargers miss the playoffs that year and sparked an NFL rule change. Two years later, both teams returned to the playoffs, where they faced off in the 1980 AFC championship game. An offensive shootout between Raiders quarterback Jim Plunkett and Chargers quarterback Dan Fouts saw the Raiders prevail 34–27; they later won Super Bowl XV over the Philadelphia Eagles. This remains the teams' only playoff meeting

From 1982 to 1994, the Raiders played in Los Angeles, where they developed a strong following, which to this day has impeded the Chargers' ability to develop their own following in the city.

One of the ugliest games in the rivalry's history occurred in 1998. Chargers rookie quarterback Ryan Leaf completed just 7 of 18 pass attempts for 78 yards and 3 interceptions. The Raiders did not fare much better on offense, but Raiders backup quarterback Wade Wilson passed for a 68-yard touchdown, his only completion of the day. In the end, both teams had benched their starting quarterbacks as the Raiders narrowly won 7–6. The game set an NFL record for the most punts in a game.

Though the Raiders had largely dominated the series for much of the later 20th Century, the Chargers amassed a 13-game winning streak from 2003 to 2009, shortly after the Raiders' appearance in Super Bowl XXXVII and subsequent collapse. One of these losses saw Oakland squander a 15-point halftime lead to lose 28–18, head coach Lane Kiffin was subsequently fired. The Raiders ended the losing streak in 2010, defeating the Chargers 35–27 with two blocked punts, two second-half scoring drives led by quarterback Jason Campbell and a Philip Rivers fumble returned by Tyvon Branch for the Raiders' game-clinching touchdown.

The first Raiders-Chargers game in 2013 set a record: the latest kickoff time in NFL history. An Oakland Athletics game the previous evening pushed the football games' kickoff to 8:35 p.m. Pacific Time. The Raiders won 27–17 with a strong performance by quarterback Terrelle Pryor, a fumble return touchdown by Charles Woodson, and five San Diego turnovers. San Diego won the season's second matchup, 26–13, keeping its playoff hopes alive.

=== 2015–2019: Bids to return to Los Angeles ===
After the 2015 season, the Raiders and Chargers proposed to move back to Los Angeles and indeed to the same home venue, announcing a shared stadium proposal in Carson, California. The proposal was rejected by NFL owners in favor of the St. Louis Rams' proposal to move back to Los Angeles; the Chargers were first being offered a one-year window to accept the chance to share the Rams' stadium and the Raiders to receive the offer should the Chargers decline. On January 12, 2017, Chargers owner Dean Spanos announced his intention to join the Rams in Los Angeles and leave San Diego to play at SoFi Stadium, ultimately leading to Raiders owner Mark Davis accepting a deal to move his team to Las Vegas to play at Allegiant Stadium with the NCAA's UNLV Rebels football program.

=== 2020–present: Post-move ===
After both teams' moves by the 2020 season, the Chargers' first home game in the series at the new SoFi Stadium featured a notable final play. Down 31–26, Chargers rookie quarterback Justin Herbert threw a pass to Donald Parham that was initially ruled a touchdown but was overturned after review as Raiders cornerback Isaiah Johnson was seen barely jarring the ball loose from Parham's hands as he fell out of bounds. The Raiders held on to win. Both teams narrowly missed the playoffs that year.

After a 63–21 Raiders win in the series on Thursday Night Football in 2023, head coach Brandon Staley and general manager Tom Telesco were fired by the Chargers on December 15, 2023. The Chargers-Raiders game set a Chargers franchise record for most points allowed in a single game, along with a Raiders franchise record for most points scored in a single game. The following offseason, Raiders owner Mark Davis hired Telesco to be the team's new general manager.

==== 2021 Week 18 Raiders-Chargers game ====
The game between the two teams during the final week of the 2021 season would decide the final AFC wild card spots that year. Las Vegas took a commanding 29–14 lead in the fourth quarter, but Herbert led the Chargers back to tie the game at 29 apiece after Herbert converted 4 fourth downs by the end of regulation, forcing overtime. After both teams scored field goals in the extra period, the Raiders were set to run out the clock and accept a tie, but after a Chargers timeout, Las Vegas drove back to field goal range and won the game with a kick in the final seconds of overtime, clinching the #5 seed while eliminating the Chargers and allowing the Pittsburgh Steelers to clinch the #7 seed. Had the teams tied, they would have both made the postseason over Pittsburgh, which both teams had defeated earlier in the season.

After the game, Raiders quarterback Derek Carr was asked by NBC sideline reporter Michele Tafoya whether the timeout changed their mindset on the final drive, he replied, "It definitely did, obviously." In a post-game press conference, Raiders interim head coach Rich Bisaccia, when asked if the Raiders were playing to tie, said, "We were talking about it. . . . We ran the ball there, and they didn’t call a timeout. So I think they were probably thinking the same thing. And then we had the big run. When we got the big run, it got us in advantageous field goal position. . . . We were certainly talking about it on the sideline. We wanted to see if they were gonna take a timeout or not on that run. They didn’t, so we thought they were thinking the same thing. And then we popped the run in there and gave us a chance to kick the field goal to win it. So, we were certainly talking about it.” When asked about the timeout by the Los Angeles Times, Chargers head coach Brandon Staley said "We felt like they were going to run the ball. So we wanted to ... make that substitution so that we could get a play where we would deepen the field goal." In Justin Herbert's post game press conference he said "I had never been rooting for a tie more in my life. That's the unfortunate part of being so close."

== Season-by-season results ==
San Diego/Los Angeles Chargers vs. Oakland/Los Angeles/Las Vegas Raiders Season-by-Season Results
1960s (Chargers, 11–9)

Season	Season series	at Los Angeles/San Diego Chargers	at Oakland Raiders	Overall series	Notes
1960	Chargers 2–0	Chargers; 52–28	Chargers; 41–17	Chargers; 2–0	Inaugural season for both franchises and the American Football League (AFL). Chargers and Raiders were placed in the AFL Western Division, resulting in two meetings annually. Last season until the 2017 season the Chargers played as a Los Angeles-based team. Chargers lose 1960 AFL Championship.
1961	Chargers 2–0	Chargers; 44–0	Chargers; 41–10	Chargers; 4–0	Chargers relocate to San Diego. In San Diego, Chargers record their largest victory against the Raiders with a 44–point differential and set a franchise record for their largest victory overall (broken in 1963). In Oakland, The Raiders finished with 58 total yards, setting a franchise record for the fewest yards in a game, while the Chargers set a franchise record for the fewest yards allowed in a game. Chargers lose 1961 AFL Championship.
1962	Chargers 2–0	Chargers; 31–21	Chargers; 42–33	Chargers; 6–0	
1963	Raiders 2–0	Raiders; 34–33	Raiders; 41–27	Chargers; 6–2	In Oakland, Raiders overcame a 27–10 fourth quarter deficit. Raiders' win in San Diego is the Chargers' only home loss in the 1963 season. Chargers win 1963 AFL Championship.
1964	Tie 1–1	Chargers; 31–17	Raiders; 21–20	Chargers; 7–3	Chargers lose 1964 AFL Championship.
1965	Chargers 2–0	Chargers; 24–14	Chargers; 17–6	Chargers; 9–3	Chargers lose 1965 AFL Championship.
1966	Tie 1–1	Raiders; 41–19	Chargers; 29–20	Chargers; 10–4	
1967	Raiders 2–0	Raiders; 41–21	Raiders; 51–10	Chargers; 10–6	Chargers open San Diego Stadium. Raiders’ win in Oakland handed the Chargers their first loss of the season after a 5–0–1 start. Raiders win 1967 AFL Championship, but lose Super Bowl II.
1968	Tie 1–1	Raiders; 34–27	Chargers; 23–14	Chargers; 11–7	Raiders lose 1968 AFL Championship.
1969	Raiders 2–0	Raiders; 24–12	Raiders; 21–16	Chargers; 11–9	Raiders lose 1969 AFL Championship.

1970s (Raiders, 15–3–2)

Season	Season series	at San Diego Chargers	at Oakland Raiders	Overall series	Notes
1970	Raiders 1–0–1	Tie; 27–27	Raiders; 20–17	Chargers; 11–10–1	As a result of the AFL–NFL merger, the Chargers and Raiders are placed in the AFC West.
1971	Raiders 2–0	Raiders; 34–0	Raiders; 34–33	Raiders; 12–11–1	
1972	Raiders 1–0–1	Raiders; 21–19	Tie; 17–17	Raiders; 13–11–2	
1973	Raiders 2–0	Raiders; 27–17	Raiders; 31–3	Raiders; 15–11–2	
1974	Raiders 2–0	Raiders; 14–10	Raiders; 17–10	Raiders; 17–11–2	
1975	Raiders 2–0	Raiders; 6–0	Raiders; 25–0	Raiders; 19–11–2	
1976	Raiders 2–0	Raiders; 27–17	Raiders; 24–0	Raiders; 21–11–2	Raiders win Super Bowl XI.
1977	Tie 1–1	Chargers; 12–7	Raiders; 24–0	Raiders; 22–12–2	Raiders win 10 straight meetings (1972–1977).
1978	Tie 1–1	Raiders; 21–20	Chargers; 27–23	Raiders; 23–13–2	In San Diego, Raiders overcame a 20–7 fourth quarter deficit and win on a controversial Holy Roller play.
1979	Tie 1–1	Chargers; 30–10	Raiders; 45–22	Raiders; 24–14–2	

1980s (Raiders, 14–7)

Season	Season series	at San Diego Chargers	at Oakland/Los Angeles Raiders	Overall series	Notes
1980	Tie 1–1	Chargers; 30–24 (OT)	Raiders; 38–24	Raiders; 25–15–2	First overtime result in the series. Both teams finished with 11–5 records, but the Chargers clinched the AFC West based on better net points in division games.
1980 Playoffs	Raiders 1–0	Raiders; 34–27	—N/a	Raiders; 26–15–2	AFC Championship Game. Raiders go on to win Super Bowl XV.
1981	Chargers 2–0	Chargers; 23–10	Chargers; 55–21	Raiders; 26–17–2	In Oakland, Chargers scored their most points in a game against the Raiders, and Chargers' TE Kellen Winslow caught five touchdown receptions, tying an NFL record. Chargers' first season series sweep against the Raiders since the 1965 season. Last season until the 1995 season the Raiders played as an Oakland-based team.
1982	Raiders 2–0	Raiders; 41–34	Raiders; 28–24	Raiders; 28–17–2	Raiders relocate to Los Angeles. Both games are played despite the 1982 NFL players strike reducing the season to nine games. In Los Angeles, Raiders overcame a 24–0 deficit. The 24-point comeback set a new Raiders franchise record for largest comeback, while the 24-point blown lead set a new Chargers franchise record for largest blown lead (broken in 2022).
1983	Raiders 2–0	Raiders; 42–10	Raiders; 30–14	Raiders; 30–17–2	Raiders win Super Bowl XVIII.
1984	Raiders 2–0	Raiders; 44–37	Raiders; 33–30	Raiders; 32–17–2	
1985	Tie 1–1	Chargers; 40–34 (OT)	Raiders; 34–21	Raiders; 33–18–2	
1986	Raiders 2–0	Raiders; 37–31 (OT)	Raiders; 17–13	Raiders; 35–18–2	
1987	Chargers 2–0	Chargers; 16–14	Chargers; 23–17	Raiders; 35–20–2	
1988	Raiders 2–0	Raiders; 13–3	Raiders; 24–13	Raiders; 37–20–2	
1989	Tie 1–1	Chargers; 14–12	Raiders; 40–14	Raiders; 38–21–2	

1990s (Raiders, 11–9)

Season	Season series	at San Diego Chargers	at Los Angeles/Oakland Raiders	Overall series	Notes
1990	Raiders 2–0	Raiders; 24–9	Raiders; 17–12	Raiders; 40–21–2	
1991	Tie 1–1	Raiders; 9–7	Chargers; 21–13	Raiders; 41–22–2	
1992	Chargers 2–0	Chargers; 27–3	Chargers; 36–14	Raiders; 41–24–2	
1993	Tie 1–1	Raiders; 12–7	Chargers; 30–23	Raiders; 42–25–2	
1994	Tie 1–1	Raiders; 24–17	Chargers; 26–24	Raiders; 43–26–2	Last season the Raiders played as a Los Angeles-based team. Chargers lose Super Bowl XXIX.
1995	Tie 1–1	Chargers; 12–6	Raiders; 17–7	Raiders; 44–27–2	Raiders relocate back to Oakland.
1996	Tie 1–1	Raiders; 23–14	Chargers; 40–34	Raiders; 45–28–2	
1997	Tie 1–1	Raiders; 38–13	Chargers; 25–10	Raiders; 46–29–2	
1998	Raiders 2–0	Raiders; 17–10	Raiders; 7–6	Raiders; 48–29–2	
1999	Tie 1–1	Chargers; 23–20	Raiders; 28–9	Raiders; 49–30–2	

2000s (Chargers, 14–6)

Season	Season series	at San Diego Chargers	at Oakland Raiders	Overall series	Notes
2000	Raiders 2–0	Raiders; 15–13	Raiders; 9–6	Raiders; 51–30–2	
2001	Raiders 2–0	Raiders; 13–6	Raiders; 34–24	Raiders; 53–30–2	
2002	Tie 1–1	Raiders; 27–7	Chargers; 27–21 (OT)	Raiders; 54–31–2	Raiders lose Super Bowl XXXVII.
2003	Tie 1–1	Chargers; 21–14	Raiders; 34–31 (OT)	Raiders; 55–32–2	In Oakland, Raiders overcame a 31–17 fourth quarter deficit.
2004	Chargers 2–0	Chargers; 42–14	Chargers; 23–17	Raiders; 55–34–2	Chargers' first season series sweep against the Raiders since the 1992 season.
2005	Chargers 2–0	Chargers; 34–10	Chargers; 27–14	Raiders; 55–36–2	
2006	Chargers 2–0	Chargers; 21–14	Chargers; 27–0	Raiders; 55–38–2	First start for Chargers quarterback Philip Rivers in the rivalry.
2007	Chargers 2–0	Chargers; 28–14	Chargers; 30–17	Raiders; 55–40–2	
2008	Chargers 2–0	Chargers; 34–7	Chargers; 28–18	Raiders; 55–42–2	In Oakland, Raiders wore white jerseys at home for the first time in franchise history. Chargers overcame a 15–0 second half deficit.
2009	Chargers 2–0	Chargers; 24–16	Chargers; 24–20	Raiders; 55–44–2	Chargers won 13 straight meetings (2003–2009).

2010s (Tie, 10–10)

Season	Season series	at San Diego/Los Angeles Chargers	at Oakland Raiders	Overall series	Notes
2010	Raiders 2–0	Raiders; 28–13	Raiders; 35–27	Raiders; 57–44–2	Raiders sweep their division but miss the playoffs, an NFL first.
2011	Tie 1–1	Raiders; 24–17	Chargers; 38–26	Raiders; 58–45–2	
2012	Chargers 2–0	Chargers; 24–21	Chargers; 22–14	Raiders; 58–47–2	
2013	Tie 1–1	Chargers; 26–13	Raiders; 27–17	Raiders; 59–48–2	
2014	Chargers 2–0	Chargers; 13–6	Chargers; 31–28	Raiders; 59–50–2	First start for Raiders quarterback Derek Carr in the rivalry.
2015	Raiders 2–0	Raiders; 37–29	Raiders; 23–20 (OT)	Raiders; 61–50–2	
2016	Raiders 2–0	Raiders; 19–16	Raiders; 34–31	Raiders; 63–50–2	Last season the Chargers played as a San Diego-based team.
2017	Chargers 2–0	Chargers; 30–10	Chargers; 17–16	Raiders; 63–52–2	Chargers relocate back to Los Angeles.
2018	Chargers 2–0	Chargers; 26–10	Chargers; 20–6	Raiders; 63–54–2	
2019	Raiders 2–0	Raiders; 24–17	Raiders; 26–24	Raiders; 65–54–2	Last season Raiders played as an Oakland-based team and as a California-based team. Last start for Philip Rivers in the rivalry.

2020s (Chargers, 8–5)

Season	Season series	at Los Angeles Chargers	at Las Vegas Raiders	Overall series	Notes
2020	Tie 1–1	Raiders; 31–26	Chargers; 30–27 (OT)	Raiders; 66–55–2	Raiders relocate to Las Vegas. Chargers open SoFi Stadium. Both games were decided on the final play. First start for Chargers quarterback Justin Herbert in the rivalry.
2021	Tie 1–1	Chargers; 28–14	Raiders; 35–32 (OT)	Raiders; 67–56–2	Raiders' win clinched them a playoff berth and eliminated the Chargers from playoff contention.
2022	Tie 1–1	Chargers; 24–19	Raiders; 27–20	Raiders; 68–57–2	Last start for Derek Carr in the rivalry.
2023	Tie 1–1	Chargers; 24–17	Raiders; 63–21	Raiders; 69–58–2	In Las Vegas, Raiders recorded their largest victory against the Chargers with a 42–point differential, scored their most points in a game against the Chargers, and set a franchise record for their most points scored in a game. Meanwhile, the Chargers set a franchise record for the most points allowed in a game. After the game, the Chargers fired their head coach Brandon Staley and general manager Tom Telesco.
2024	Chargers 2–0	Chargers; 22–10	Chargers; 34–20	Raiders; 69–60–2	With their loss in Las Vegas, Raiders go winless in their division for the first time since the 2006 season.
2025	Chargers 2–0	Chargers; 31–14	Chargers; 20–9	Raiders; 69–62–2	
2026	Raiders 1–0	Raiders; 26–14	December 13	Raiders; 70–62–2	

Summary of Results

Season	Season series	at San Diego/Los Angeles Chargers	at Oakland/Los Angeles/Las Vegas Raiders	Notes
AFL regular season	Chargers 11–9	Tie 5–5	Chargers 6–4	
NFL regular season	Raiders 60–51–2	Raiders 29–27–1	Raiders 31–24–1	
AFL and NFL regular season	Raiders 69–62–2	Raiders 34–32–1	Raiders 35–30–1	
NFL postseason	Raiders 1–0	Raiders 1–0	no games	AFC Championship: 1980
Regular and postseason	Raiders 70–62–2	Raiders 35–32–1	Raiders 35–30–1	At Chargers' home games: Raiders have a 32–24–1 record in San Diego while the Chargers currently have an 8–3 record in Los Angeles. At Raiders' home games: Raiders have a 24–22–1 record in Oakland, an 8–5 record in Los Angeles, and currently have a 3–3 record in Las Vegas.

== Series leaders ==
Statistics limited to Chargers–Raiders regular season games. Correct through the 2023 season.

	Chargers	Raiders	Ref
Passing yards	Philip Rivers – 7,103	Derek Carr – 4,056	
Rushing yards	LaDainian Tomlinson – 2,017	Marcus Allen – 1,235	
Receiving yards	Antonio Gates – 1,424	Tim Brown – 1,697	
Touchdowns	LaDainian Tomlinson – 25	Marcus Allen – 20	
Sacks	Shaun Phillips – 14	Greg Townsend – 13.5	
Interceptions	Speedy Duncan – 7	Dave Grayson – 8	

== See also ==
- List of NFL rivalries
- AFC West
- Pete Carroll–Jim Harbaugh rivalry
