= JoJo Wooden =

American football executive (born 1969)

Baltimore Ravens
- Title: Area scout

Personal information
- Born: October 14, 1969 (age 57); Hartford, Connecticut, U.S.
- Listed height: 6 ft 4 in (1.93 m)
- Listed weight: 239 lb (108 kg)

Career information
- High school: Farmington (Farmington, Connecticut)
- College: Syracuse (1988–1992)
- NFL draft: 1993: undrafted

Career history

Playing
- Phoenix Cardinals (1993)*
- * Offseason or practice squad member only

Coaching
- Simsbury High School (1993) Assistant coach; American International (c. 1994–1996) Assistant coach

Operations
- New York Jets (1997–1998) Pro personnel assistant; New York Jets (1999–2000) Pro scout; New York Jets (2001–2002) Senior pro scout/AFC; New York Jets (2003) Assistant director of pro scouting; New York Jets (2004–2006) Director of pro scouting; New York Jets (2007–2012) Assistant director of player personnel; San Diego / Los Angeles Chargers (2013–2023) Director of player personnel; Los Angeles Chargers (2023) Interim general manager & director of player personnel; Las Vegas Raiders (2024) Senior director of player personnel; Baltimore Ravens (2026-present) West coast Area scout
- Executive profile at Pro Football Reference

Edward Lewis "JoJo" Wooden (born October 14, 1969) is an American football executive who most serves as an area scout for the Baltimore Ravens of the National Football League (NFL). He played college football for the Syracuse Orangemen and had a stint with the Phoenix Cardinals in 1993. Wooden then spent several years as a coach before joining the New York Jets in a scouting position. After 16 years with the Jets, he joined the San Diego Chargers in 2013 as director of player personnel. Wooden served the end of the 2023 season as interim general manager after the firing of Tom Telesco.

== Early life ==
Wooden was born on October 14, 1969, in Hartford, Connecticut. The brother of National Football League (NFL) player Terry Wooden, he attended Farmington High School where he was a team captain in football and basketball. He was first-team All-State in football, was the team MVP his last two years, and was also All-State in basketball while being the leading scorer in Class M with 26 points-per-game. He played in the annual state All-Star Game and was his side's MVP.

== College career ==
Wooden followed in his brother's footsteps and played college football for the Syracuse Orangemen, redshirting as a true freshman in 1988. In 1989, as a redshirt freshman, he played all 12 games for Syracuse on special teams and totaled 16 tackles. He then played all 13 games in 1990, mainly at special teams but also as a backup outside linebacker, recording 13 tackles. He became a starter as a junior in 1990, but was injured after having started the first six games and was a backup for the final three after he returned, ending the year with 38 tackles.

Wooden began the 1992 season at defensive tackle before returning after three games to outside linebacker; he started all 12 games and made 58 tackles while tying for the team-lead with 5.5 sacks and being second in the conference with two fumbles recovered. He concluded his collegiate career having won three letters and played 46 games with 21 starts. He helped them reach bowl games in all of his seasons with the school and Syracuse had consecutive 10–2 records and top-10 rankings in Wooden's last two years. He graduated from Syracuse with a degree in sociology.

== Professional career ==
Wooden was signed by the Phoenix Cardinals as an undrafted free agent following the 1993 NFL draft, but did not make the final roster.

== Coaching and executive career ==
After being released by the Cardinals, Wooden joined Simsbury High School as an assistant coach, working with the linebackers and running backs. He left the school prior to the 1994 season. He then served for a time as an assistant coach of the NCAA Division II American International Yellow Jackets.

Wooden had kept in touch with Scott Pioli, who was a coach at Syracuse while Wooden played there, and Pioli, now director of player personnel with the NFL's New York Jets, hired Wooden as a pro personnel assistant. An article from Associated Press noted that "[t]he entry-level job involved cataloging and cutting evaluation tapes, keeping the pro roster boards updated and watching tape for what was a tiny pro personnel department at the time." He remained with the Jets for 16 years and served through five head coaches, two owners and stayed after Pioli left the team. His position was pro personnel assistant from 1997 to 1998, pro scout from 1999 to 2000, senior pro scout of the American Football Conference (AFC) from 2001 to 2002, assistant director of pro scouting in 2003, director of pro scouting from 2004 to 2006, and assistant director of player personnel from 2007 to 2012. Until 2007, Wooden worked mainly in the team's pro scouting department, but he shifted to the college side with his appointment of assistant director of player personnel and was the team's only staff member to have roles in both sides in his final six years.

Wooden accepted a position as the director of player personnel for the San Diego Chargers (renamed the Los Angeles Chargers in 2016) in 2013. In this role, he became the leader of both the team's pro and college scouting departments. While with the Chargers, he received interviews for general manager positions with several other teams, including from the Pittsburgh Steelers, Washington Commanders and Chicago Bears. After Chargers general manager Tom Telesco was fired with three games remaining in the 2023 season, Wooden was named the team's interim general manager.

On February 26, 2024, the Las Vegas Raiders hired Wooden as a senior director of player personnel.

On February 7, 2025, Wooden was relieved as Raiders senior director of player personnel along with senior national scout Dujuan Daniels.

On April 29, 2026, the Baltimore Ravens hired Wooden to serve as a front office consultant.
