= Giff Smith =

American football coach (born 1968)

Los Angeles Rams
- Title: Defensive line coach/run game coordinator

Personal information
- Born: October 12, 1968 (age 58); Mableton, Georgia, U.S.

Career information
- Position: Defensive end
- College: Georgia Southern

Career history
- Arkansas (1991–1993) Graduate assistant; Georgia (1994–1995) Graduate assistant; Georgia Southern (1996–1998) Wide receivers coach; Tulane (1999–2003) Defensive line coach; Georgia Tech (2004–2009) Defensive line coach; Buffalo Bills (2010–2012) Defensive line coach; Tennessee Titans (2014–2015) Defensive line coach; San Diego / Los Angeles Chargers (2016–2021) Defensive line coach; Los Angeles Chargers (2022) Outside linebackers coach; Los Angeles Chargers (2023) Interim head coach & outside linebackers coach; Los Angeles Rams (2024–present) Defensive line coach & run game coordinator

Head coaching record
- Regular season: 0–3 (.000)
- Coaching profile at Pro Football Reference

Giff Smith (born October 12, 1968) is an American football coach who is the defensive line coach and run game coordinator for the Los Angeles Rams of the National Football League (NFL). He previously served as the interim head coach for the 2023 season with the Los Angeles Chargers. He was also an assistant coach for the Tennessee Titans and Buffalo Bills.

== Early life and education ==
A native of Mableton, Georgia, Smith played defensive end at Georgia Southern University and was a three-time All-American.

== Coaching career ==
=== Early career ===
Smith began his coaching career as a graduate assistant at the University of Arkansas in 1991. He would then serve as a graduate assistant at the University of Georgia from 1994 to 1995.

=== Georgia Southern ===
In 1996, Smith was hired as the wide receivers coach at Georgia Southern University.

=== Tulane ===
In 1999, Smith was hired as the defensive line coach at Tulane University.

=== Georgia Tech ===
In 2004, Smith was hired as the defensive line coach at Georgia Tech.

=== Buffalo Bills ===
In 2010, Smith was hired by the Buffalo Bills as their defensive line coach under head coach Chan Gailey. During his time there, Smith is credited with helping with the emergence of Kyle Williams.

He was dismissed, along with the entire Bills coaching staff, on December 31, 2012.

=== Tennessee Titans ===
In 2014, Smith was hired by the Tennessee Titans as their defensive line coach under head coach Ken Whisenhunt.

=== San Diego / Los Angeles Chargers ===
In 2016, Smith was hired by the San Diego Chargers as their defensive line coach under head coach Mike McCoy.

In 2017, Smith was retained by the Los Angeles Chargers under head coach Anthony Lynn. In 2022, Smith was promoted to outside linebackers coach under head coach Brandon Staley.

On December 15, 2023, Smith was named the interim head coach following the firing of head coach Brandon Staley. On December 23, 2023, Smith made his head coaching debut against the Buffalo Bills but the Chargers were defeated 22–24 although they surprised the Bills with a 10–0 and 22–21 lead with under a minute left.

=== Los Angeles Rams ===
In 2024, Smith was hired by the Los Angeles Rams as their defensive line coach.

== Head coaching record ==
| Team | Year | Regular season | | | | | Postseason | | | |
| Team | Year | Won | Lost | Ties | Win % | Finish | Won | Lost | Win % | Result |
|---|---|---|---|---|---|---|---|---|---|---|
| LAC* | 2023 | 0 | 3 | 0 | .000 | 4th in AFC West | — | — | — | — |
| Total | | 0 | 3 | 0 | .000 | | 0 | 0 | .000 | |

* Interim head coach

== Personal life ==
Smith and his wife, Jennifer, have two children: Ava and Sam Smith. Ava attends Southern Methodist University and Sam plays football at JSerra Catholic High School.
