= Nick Williams (defensive lineman) =

American football player (born 1990)

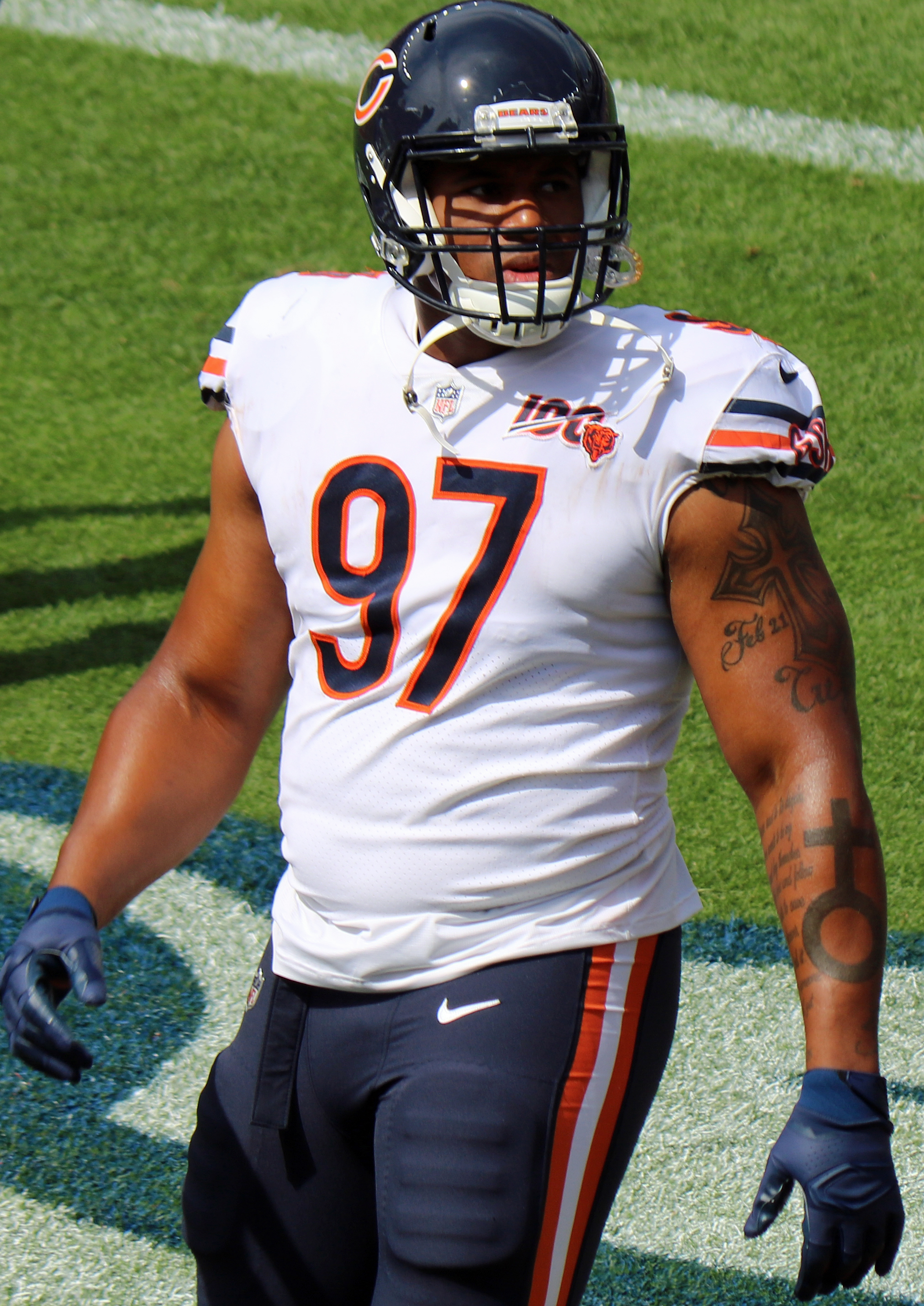
- Williams with the Chicago Bears in 2019

No. 75, 93, 95, 97, 98
- Position: Defensive tackle

Personal information
- Born: February 21, 1990 (age 36); Birmingham, Alabama, U.S.
- Listed height: 6 ft 4 in (1.93 m)
- Listed weight: 310 lb (141 kg)

Career information
- High school: Minor (Adamsville, Alabama)
- College: Samford (2008–2012)
- NFL draft: 2013: 7th round, 223rd overall pick

Career history
- Pittsburgh Steelers (2013–2014); Kansas City Chiefs (2014–2016); Miami Dolphins (2016); Chicago Bears (2018–2019); Detroit Lions (2020–2021); New York Giants (2022); Los Angeles Chargers (2023); San Francisco 49ers (2024)*
- * Offseason or practice squad member only

Career NFL statistics
- Total tackles: 157
- Sacks: 8.5
- Fumble recoveries: 4
- Pass deflections: 7
- Stats at Pro Football Reference

Nick Williams (born February 21, 1990) is an American former professional football player who was a defensive tackle in the National Football League (NFL). He was selected by the Pittsburgh Steelers in the seventh round of the 2013 NFL draft after his college football career with the Samford Bulldogs. He also played for the Kansas City Chiefs, Miami Dolphins, Chicago Bears, Detroit Lions, New York Giants and Los Angeles Chargers.

== Early life ==
Williams was a lightly recruited player out of Minor High School in Birmingham, Alabama, having played basketball for two years before switching to football in his senior year. At Samford, Williams was red-shirted as a freshman in 2008 and then saw two years of backup duties from 2009 to 2010. In 2011, Williams earned a starting position, notching 23 tackles and three tackles for loss over all eleven games. Williams improved on his performance in 2012, accumulating 31 tackles, eight for a loss, six sacks, and a blocked kick while starting all eleven games.

== Professional career ==
Pre-draft measurables
Height	Weight	Arm length	Hand span	Wingspan	40-yard dash	10-yard split	20-yard split	20-yard shuttle	Three-cone drill	Vertical jump	Broad jump	Bench press
6 ft 4 1/2 in (1.94 m)	309 lb (140 kg)	34 1/8 in (0.87 m)	10 1/4 in (0.26 m)	6 ft 9 in (2.06 m)	4.94 s	1.70 s	2.86 s	4.65 s	7.55 s	33 in (0.84 m)	9 ft 3 in (2.82 m)	28 reps
All values from NFL Combine

=== Pittsburgh Steelers ===
Williams was selected in the seventh round with the 223rd overall pick in the 2013 NFL draft by the Pittsburgh Steelers. On August 25, 2013, he was placed on the Steelers' injured reserve list. He was released by the Steelers on August 30, 2014 and was signed to the team's practice squad the next day.

=== Kansas City Chiefs ===
On November 24, 2014, Williams was signed by the Kansas City Chiefs off the Steelers' practice squad. He was re-signed by the team on April 18, 2016. He was released on October 18, 2016.

=== Miami Dolphins ===
On October 19, 2016, Williams was signed by the Miami Dolphins. He was released on September 2, 2017.

=== Chicago Bears ===
On April 19, 2018, Williams was signed by the Chicago Bears. He re-signed with the team on a one-year contract on March 15, 2019.

In 2019, Williams recorded his first career sack against the Denver Broncos on Joe Flacco. In week 4 against the Minnesota Vikings, Williams sacked Kirk Cousins twice and recovered a fumble forced by Khalil Mack in the 16-6 win.

=== Detroit Lions ===
On March 24, 2020, Williams signed a two-year, $10 million contract with the Detroit Lions.

=== New York Giants ===
On July 26, 2022, the New York Giants signed Williams. On November 7, 2022, Williams was placed on injured reserve with a bicep injury, and missed the remainder of the season.

=== Los Angeles Chargers ===
On May 18, 2023, Willams was signed by the Los Angeles Chargers to a one-year deal.

=== San Francisco 49ers ===
On August 14, 2024, Williams signed with the San Francisco 49ers. He was released on August 27.

== NFL career statistics ==
Legend
**Bold**	Career high

=== Regular season ===
Year	Team	Games		Tackles					Interceptions					Fumbles			
Year	Team	GP	GS	Cmb	Solo	Ast	Sck	TFL	Int	Yds	TD	Lng	PD	FF	FR	Yds	TD
2014	KAN	2	0	0	0	0	0.0	0	0	0	0	0	0	0	0	0	0
2015	KAN	14	0	9	5	4	0.0	2	0	0	0	0	0	0	0	0	0
2016	KAN	5	0	5	4	1	0.0	0	0	0	0	0	0	0	0	0	0
2016	MIA	5	0	2	2	0	0.0	0	0	0	0	0	0	0	0	0	0
2018	CHI	2	0	2	1	1	0.0	1	0	0	0	0	0	0	0	0	0
2019	CHI	16	5	**42**	**24**	**18**	**6.0**	5	0	0	0	0	**2**	0	**2**	**4**	0
2020	DET	14	13	23	12	11	1.0	2	0	0	0	0	**2**	0	0	0	0
2021	DET	**17**	**17**	27	14	13	0.5	4	0	0	0	0	1	0	0	0	0
2022	NYG	8	7	15	5	10	0.0	0	0	0	0	0	**2**	0	0	0	0
2023	LAC	14	6	32	16	16	1.0	**7**	0	0	0	0	0	0	**2**	0	0
Career		97	48	157	83	74	8.5	21	0	0	0	0	7	0	4	4	0

=== Playoffs ===
Year	Team	Games		Tackles					Interceptions					Fumbles			
Year	Team	GP	GS	Cmb	Solo	Ast	Sck	TFL	Int	Yds	TD	Lng	PD	FF	FR	Yds	TD
2015	KAN	**1**	0	0	0	0	0.0	0	0	0	0	0	0	0	0	0	0
2016	MIA	**1**	0	**2**	**1**	**1**	0.0	0	0	0	0	0	0	0	0	0	0
Career		2	0	2	1	1	0.0	0	0	0	0	0	0	0	0	0	0
