= Ty Shelby =

American football player (born 1998)

Profile
- Position: Linebacker

Personal information
- Born: October 14, 1998 (age 28); Houston, Texas, U.S.
- Listed height: 6 ft 4 in (1.93 m)
- Listed weight: 260 lb (118 kg)

Career information
- High school: Friendswood (Friendswood, Texas)
- College: Louisiana–Monroe (2017–2021)
- NFL draft: 2022: undrafted

Career history
- Los Angeles Chargers (2022–2023)

Career NFL statistics as of 2023
- Total tackles: 1
- Stats at Pro Football Reference

Ty Shelby (born October 14, 1998) is an American professional football linebacker. He played college football at Louisiana–Monroe.

== College career ==
Coming out of high school, Shelby committed to play college football at Louisiana-Monroe. He played for the Warhawks football and baseball teams. In Shelby's basketball career he only played six minutes, totaling two steals. In Shelby's football career, he played in 44 games notching 146 tackles with 25 going for a loss, 12.5 sacks, a pass deflection, a fumble recovery, and a forced fumble.

== Professional career ==
Pre-draft measurables
Height	Weight	Arm length	Hand span	40-yard dash	10-yard split	20-yard split	20-yard shuttle	Three-cone drill	Vertical jump	Broad jump	Bench press
6 ft 3 7/8 in (1.93 m)	249 lb (113 kg)	33 7/8 in (0.86 m)	10 1/8 in (0.26 m)	4.79 s	1.56 s	2.72 s	4.60 s	7.22 s	34 in (0.86 m)	9 ft 9 in (2.97 m)	26 reps
All values from Pro Day

After not being selected in the 2022 NFL draft, Shelby signed with the Los Angeles Chargers as an undrafted free agent. However, he was released during final roster cuts on August 23. On January 16, 2023, Shelby signed a futures contract with the Chargers heading into the 2023 season. He was again released during final roster cuts on August 29, but signed to the practice squad a few weeks later on September 13. On October 24, Shelby was again released by the Chargers. On November 21, Shelby re-signed to the Chargers practice squad. On January 6, 2024, Shelby was signed to the Chargers active roster ahead of their season finale in week 18.

On August 27, 2024, Shelby was waived by the Chargers.
