= C. J. Okoye =

Nigerian American football player (born 2001)

No. 99 – New York Giants
- Position: Nose tackle
- Roster status: Active

Personal information
- Born: 20 October 2001 (age 25); Agbogugu, Enugu State, Nigeria
- Listed height: 6 ft 6 in (1.98 m)
- Listed weight: 365 lb (166 kg)

Career information
- NFL draft: 2023: undrafted

Career history
- Los Angeles Chargers (2023–2024)*; Baltimore Ravens (2025); New York Giants (2026–present)
- * Offseason or practice squad member only

Career NFL statistics as of 2025
- Total tackles: 15
- Pass deflections: 1
- Stats at Pro Football Reference

Basil Chijioke "C. J." Okoye (born 20 October 2001) is a Nigerian professional American football defensive end for the New York Giants of the National Football League (NFL). From Enugu State, Nigeria, he joined the Los Angeles Chargers through the International Player Pathway Program (IPPP) in 2023.

== Early life ==
Okoye was born on 20 October 2001, in Agbogugu, Enugu State, Nigeria. He grew up playing basketball, and played in a high-level league before being noticed by Ejike Ugboaja, who suggested he enter the UpRise American football camp, hosted by Osi Umenyiora to identify talent from African countries. He struggled at the camp, but Umenyiora thought he performed well enough to take a shot on him and invited Okoye to the 2022 NFL Africa camp held in Ghana.

Okoye at first was trained to play offensive lineman, and was named the offensive most valuable player at the NFL Africa camp. He then became one of 38 players to be invited to the NFL International Combine in London, England. He made the cut, being selected as one of 13 players for the National Football League (NFL)'s International Player Pathway Program (IPPP) and trained at IMG Academy in Florida. He made the final cut and was chosen as one of eight players to be allocated to NFL teams.

== Professional career ==
=== Los Angeles Chargers ===
Okoye was allocated to the Los Angeles Chargers as a defensive lineman in May 2023. He played in their first preseason game against the Los Angeles Rams and recorded a sack on Stetson Bennett, in what was the first organized game of football in his life. He was awarded the game ball afterwards, and was invited to speak on The Rich Eisen Show, where he said that he did not even know what he did was a sack. He was waived on 29 August 2023, and re-signed to the practice squad. He signed a reserve/future contract on January 11, 2024.

On August 27, 2024, Okoye was waived by the Chargers and re-signed to the practice squad.

=== Baltimore Ravens ===
Okoye signed a reserve/future contract with the Baltimore Ravens on January 21, 2025. Okoye was waived as part of final roster cuts and was re-signed to the team's practice squad the next day. He was promoted to the active roster on October 11.

=== New York Giants ===
On August 29, 2026, Okoye was traded to the New York Giants in exchange for a 2028 seventh-round pick.
