= Matt Kaskey =

American football player (born 1997)

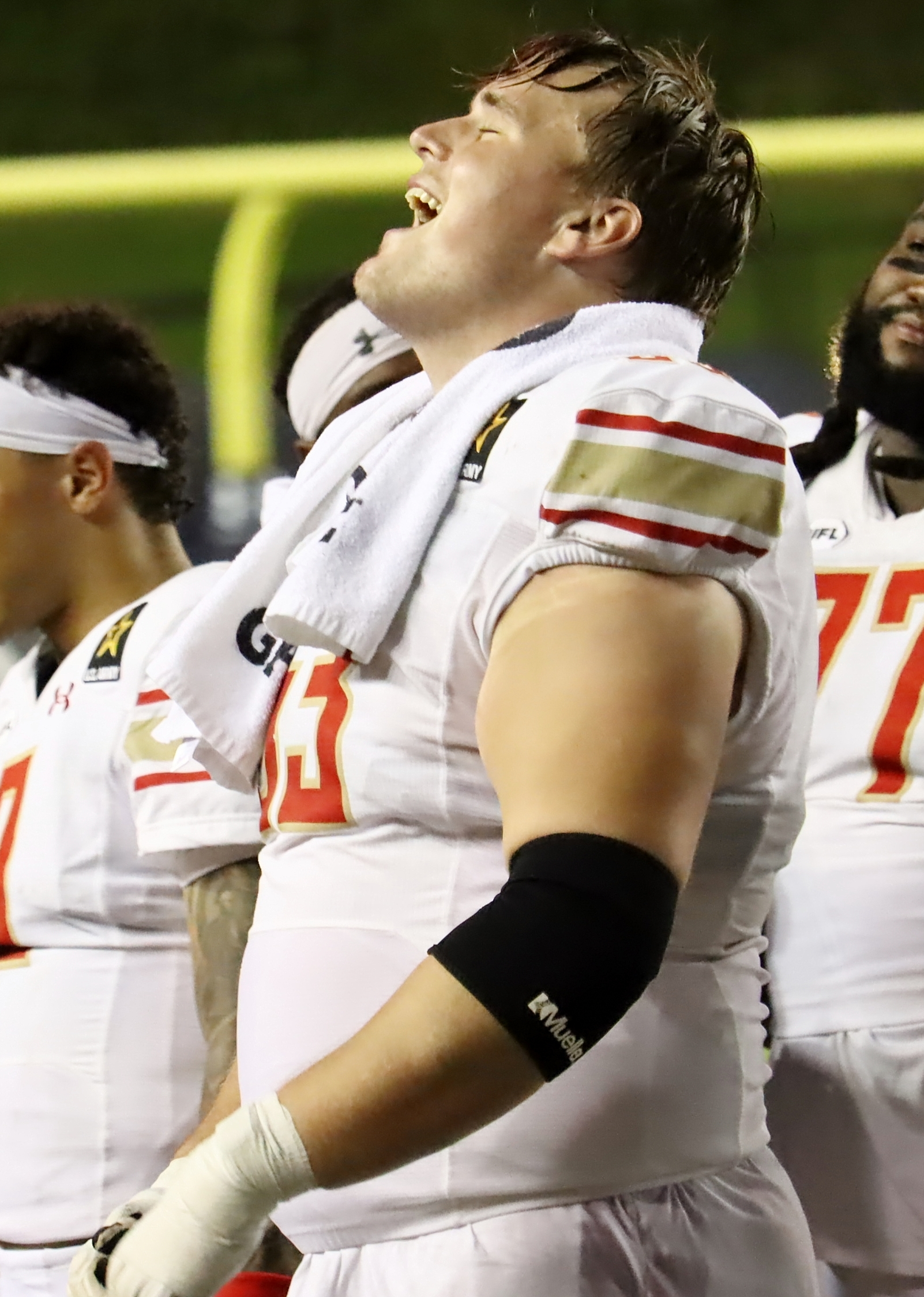
- Kaskey with the Birmingham Stallions in 2024

Profile
- Position: Offensive tackle

Personal information
- Born: March 17, 1997 (age 29); Winnetka, Illinois, U.S.
- Listed height: 6 ft 7 in (2.01 m)
- Listed weight: 325 lb (147 kg)

Career information
- High school: New Trier (Winnetka)
- College: Dartmouth
- NFL draft: 2019: undrafted

Career history
- Los Angeles Rams (2019)*; Carolina Panthers (2019–2021); Birmingham Stallions (2023); Los Angeles Chargers (2023)*; Birmingham Stallions (2024); Los Angeles Rams (2024)*
- * Offseason or practice squad member only

Awards and highlights
- UFL champion (2024); USFL champion (2023)

Career NFL statistics
- Games played: 1
- Stats at Pro Football Reference

Matthew Wallace Kaskey (born March 17, 1997) is an American professional football offensive tackle. He played college football at Dartmouth and was signed by the Rams as an undrafted free agent in 2019.

== Early life ==
At New Trier High School, Kaskey played for the football and wrestling teams. In 2014, New Trier reached the Class 8A state playoffs with an 8–1 record; Kaskey led the team as a captain and was named to the All-Chicagoland, all-conference, and all-area first-teams at the conclusion of the season. In addition to football, Kaskey also participated in track, lacrosse, and wrestling during his high school career.

== College career ==
Kaskey attended Dartmouth, where he played offensive tackle for the football program for four years, beginning in 2015. In his freshman season, Kaskey played in eight games, starting one, mostly at left tackle. In Kaskey's sophomore season, he started eight games and was named an All-Ivy honorable mention for his work at left tackle, where he would play for the rest of his collegiate career. Kaskey started all ten games in his junior season, and was named to the All-Ivy League First-team. He was also chosen as the recipient of the team's Jake Crouthamel Award, which is awarded to the underclassman who contributes the most to the success of the team. In his senior season, in which he was named a captain, Kaskey started in all ten of the Big Green's games, leading an offensive line unit that allowed just seven sacks and powered a rushing attack which averaged 254 yards a game.

Kaskey graduated from Dartmouth with a degree in history.

== Professional career ==
Pre-draft measurables
Height	Weight	Arm length	Hand span	40-yard dash	10-yard split	20-yard split	20-yard shuttle	Three-cone drill	Vertical jump	Broad jump	Bench press
6 ft 6 7/8 in (2.00 m)	326 lb (148 kg)	33 3/4 in (0.86 m)	9 5/8 in (0.24 m)	5.61 s	2.04 s	3.25 s	4.77 s	7.83 s	24.5 in (0.62 m)	8 ft 7 in (2.62 m)	17 reps
All values from Pro Day

=== Los Angeles Rams (first stint) ===
Kaskey signed with the Los Angeles Rams as an undrafted free agent following the 2019 NFL draft. On August 31, 2019, Kaskey was released by the Rams as part of final roster cuts.

=== Carolina Panthers ===
On September 24, 2019, Kaskey was signed to the Carolina Panthers practice squad. On November 12, Kaskey was released by the team, but re-signed on December 4. He was promoted to the active roster on December 21, 2019.

On September 6, 2020, Kaskey was waived by the Panthers and re-signed to the practice squad the next day. He was elevated to the active roster on December 19 and 26 for the team's weeks 15 and 16 games against the Green Bay Packers and Washington Football Team, and reverted to the practice squad after each game. He was promoted to the active roster on December 28, 2020.

On August 17, 2021, Kaskey was waived/injured and placed on injured reserve. He was released on December 21.

=== Birmingham Stallions (first stint) ===
Kaskey signed with the Birmingham Stallions of the USFL on December 13, 2022. He was released from his contract on August 8, 2023, to sign with an NFL team.

=== Los Angeles Chargers ===
Kaskey signed with the Los Angeles Chargers on August 9, 2023. He was waived on August 29.

=== Birmingham Stallions (second stint) ===
Kaskey re-signed with the Stallions of the USFL on November 6, 2023. His contract was terminated on August 5, 2024.

=== Los Angeles Rams (second stint) ===
Kaskey signed with the Rams on August 6, 2024. He was waived on August 25.
