= Kemon Hall =

American football player (born 1997)

Profile
- Position: Cornerback

Personal information
- Born: June 2, 1997 (age 29); Calhoun City, Mississippi, U.S.
- Listed height: 5 ft 11 in (1.80 m)
- Listed weight: 202 lb (92 kg)

Career information
- High school: Calhoun City
- College: Itawamba CC (2015–2016); North Texas (2017–2018)
- NFL draft: 2019: undrafted

Career history
- Los Angeles Chargers (2019)*; Minnesota Vikings (2019–2020)*; New Orleans Saints (2020)*; Dallas Cowboys (2020)*; Los Angeles Chargers (2021–2022); San Francisco 49ers (2023)*; Dallas Cowboys (2024–2025); Tennessee Titans (2025); Tampa Bay Buccaneers (2026)*
- * Offseason or practice squad member only

Career NFL statistics as of 2024
- Total tackles: 15
- Fumble recoveries: 1
- Stats at Pro Football Reference

Lagaryan Kemon Hall (born June 2, 1997) is an American professional football cornerback. He played college football for the North Texas Mean Green and was signed by the Los Angeles Chargers as an undrafted free agent in 2019.

== Early life ==
Kemon Hall was born on June 2, 1997, in Calhoun City, Mississippi. He attended Calhoun City High School there before going to college at Itawamba CC. As a sophomore, Hall recorded 45 tackles in nine games. After the year he transferred to North Texas. In his first game in the NCAA, he started at cornerback and made four solo tackles. He posted his first career interception against SMU the next week, also making five tackles and deflecting two passes.

The following week Hall made seven stops, a forced fumble, and a pass break-up against Iowa. He posted six stops the following week, while playing against UAB. He set a career-high in tackles the following week at Southern Miss, also recording one pass break-up. He made four tackles the following week, six stops the next, and six tackles against Old Dominion on October 28. He made 16 tackles during the following three games, against Louisiana Tech, UTEP, and Army. He finished the year with 72 tackles in 14 games, each a start.

Against SMU in the first game of 2018, Hall intercepted a pass and returned it 36 yards for his first career score. He intercepted another pass the following game against Incarnate Word. He scored his second career touchdown a week later, returning an interception 24 yards versus Arkansas. In the next game, Hall suffered an injury early on the made him miss multiple games. In his return nearly a month later, he made one tackle against UAB. His fourth interception of the year came against Old Dominion, in a loss on November 10. He finished the year 10th in the country for interceptions, with five. He also made 48 tackles and was a First-team All-Conference USA selection.

== Professional career ==
Pre-draft measurables
Height	Weight	Arm length	Hand span	Wingspan	40-yard dash	10-yard split	20-yard split	20-yard shuttle	Three-cone drill	Vertical jump	Broad jump	Bench press
5 ft 11 1/8 in (1.81 m)	196 lb (89 kg)	29 1/2 in (0.75 m)	9 1/4 in (0.23 m)	6 ft 0 1/4 in (1.84 m)	4.50 s	1.58 s	2.59 s	4.45 s	7.15 s	35 in (0.89 m)	10 ft 3 in (3.12 m)	13 reps
All values from Pro Day

=== Los Angeles Chargers ===
After going unselected in the 2019 NFL draft, Hall was signed by the Los Angeles Chargers as an undrafted free agent on April 27. In four preseason games, he compiled eight tackles. He was released at roster cuts and signed to the practice squad the next day. He was released from the practice squad on September 10.

=== Minnesota Vikings ===
On December 31, 2019, Hall was signed to the practice squad of the Minnesota Vikings. He was signed to a future contract on January 12, 2020. He was released by the team on August 3.

=== New Orleans Saints ===
After a successful tryout with the New Orleans Saints, he was signed on August 25. He was waived on September 5 and signed to the practice squad the next day. He was released from the practice squad on September 19.

=== Dallas Cowboys ===
On December 23, ahead of their game against the Philadelphia Eagles, the Dallas Cowboys signed Hall to the practice squad. He was signed to a future contract on January 4. He was waived on May 5, 2021.

=== Los Angeles Chargers (second stint) ===
One day after being waived by Dallas, Hall was claimed by the Chargers who had originally signed him in 2019. He was waived by the Chargers on September 3. He was re-signed to the active roster on September 9, following an injury to Ryan Smith. He made his NFL debut in week one of the 2021 NFL season, playing 14 special teams snaps in a 20–16 win over the Washington Football Team. He finished his rookie year having appeared in all 16 games, while recording seven tackles and a fumble recovery.

On August 30, 2022, Hall was waived by the Chargers and signed to the practice squad the next day. He was promoted to the active roster on December 10. He was placed on injured reserve on December 26.

On August 16, 2023, Hall was waived by the Chargers.

=== San Francisco 49ers ===
On November 28, 2023, Hall was signed to the San Francisco 49ers' practice squad. He signed a reserve/future contract with San Francisco on February 13, 2024. Hall was waived on July 27.

=== Dallas Cowboys (second stint) ===
On July 28, 2024, Hall was claimed off waivers by the Dallas Cowboys. He was reunited with defensive coordinator Mike Zimmer who previously was the head coach of the Minnesota Vikings during his tenure there. He was released on August 27, and re-signed to the practice squad. On December 9, Hall was promoted to the active roster.

On August 26, 2025, Hall was released by the Cowboys as part of final roster cuts, and was subsequently re-signed to the practice squad the next day. Hall was released by Dallas once again on August 29.

On September 8, 2025, Hall was suspended three games by the NFL.

=== Tennessee Titans ===
On October 28, 2025, Hall signed with the Tennessee Titans' practice squad. He was promoted to the active roster on January 3, 2026.

=== Tampa Bay Buccaneers ===
On April 10, 2026, Hall signed a one–year contract with the Tampa Bay Buccaneers. He was released by the Buccaneers on August 10.
