= Brandon Staley =

American football player and coach (born 1982)

New Orleans Saints
- Title: Defensive coordinator

Personal information
- Born: December 10, 1982 (age 43); Perry, Ohio, U.S.

Career information
- Position: Quarterback
- High school: Perry (OH)
- College: Dayton (2001–2004); Mercyhurst (2005)

Career history
- Northern Illinois (2006–2008) Graduate assistant; St. Thomas (MN) (2009) Defensive line & assistant special teams coach; Hutchinson (2010) Co-defensive coordinator & linebackers coach; Hutchinson (2011) Associate head coach, co-defensive coordinator & linebackers coach; Tennessee (2012) Graduate assistant; John Carroll (2013) Defensive coordinator & secondary coach; James Madison (2014) Defensive coordinator & linebackers coach; John Carroll (2015–2016) Defensive coordinator & secondary coach; Chattanooga (2017) Defensive coordinator; Chicago Bears (2017–2018) Outside linebackers coach; Denver Broncos (2019) Outside linebackers coach; Los Angeles Rams (2020) Defensive coordinator; Los Angeles Chargers (2021–2023) Head coach; San Francisco 49ers (2024) Assistant head coach/defense; New Orleans Saints (2025–present) Defensive coordinator

Head coaching record
- Regular season: 24–24 (.500)
- Postseason: 0–1 (.000)
- Career: 24–25 (.490)
- Coaching profile at Pro Football Reference

Brandon John Staley (born December 10, 1982) is an American professional football coach who is the defensive coordinator for the New Orleans Saints of the National Football League (NFL). He previously served as the head coach of the Los Angeles Chargers from 2021 to 2023, the defensive coordinator for the Los Angeles Rams in 2020, and an assistant coach for the San Francisco 49ers, Denver Broncos, and Chicago Bears.

== Early life and college ==
Staley was born on December 10, 1982, in Perry, Ohio. He grew up playing AAU basketball in the Cleveland area with childhood friend Jonathan Gannon, who would also go on to be an NFL head coach. Staley was a two-sport star athlete for Perry High School, playing point guard for the basketball team and excelling at quarterback for the football team, leading Perry to a conference title and playoff appearance as a senior.

Deciding to fully commit to football despite his childhood love of basketball, Staley attended the University of Dayton from 2001–2004, playing quarterback for the Flyers. After redshirting in 2001 and serving as a backup in 2002, he became Dayton’s starting quarterback in 2003 as a redshirt sophomore. Staley led the team to a 9–2 record. As a redshirt junior in 2004, he led Dayton to a 7–3 record. In two seasons as a starter, Staley completed 168 of 293 passes for 2,609 yards and 14 touchdowns, while rushing for 639 yards and 11 touchdowns. He graduated from Dayton in 2005 with a degree in political science.

After graduating from Dayton, Staley decided to use his final year of eligibility to join his twin brother Jason, who played football at Mercyhurst College. In 2005 (his lone season at Mercyhurst), Staley served as the team’s backup quarterback, throwing for 744 yards and six touchdowns and rushing for 173 yards and one touchdown, filling in for injured starting quarterback Mitch Phillis. His offensive coordinator and quarterbacks coach at Mercyhurst was Joe Lombardi, who Staley later hired as his offensive coordinator when he became head coach of the Chargers.

== Coaching career ==
=== College ===
Staley began his coaching career as a graduate assistant at Northern Illinois University from 2006 to 2008, working with the team’s secondary in 2006 and 2007 and working with the linebackers in 2008. He also assisted with special teams for all three seasons. In 2009, he was hired as the defensive line and assistant special teams coach for the University of St. Thomas.

In 2010, Staley was hired as the co-defensive coordinator and linebackers coach for Hutchinson Community College. He added the title of associate head coach to his duties for the 2011 season. He spent the 2012 season at Tennessee as a graduate assistant, working with inside linebackers and special teams.

Staley then spent three seasons (2013, 2015, 2016) as the defensive coordinator/secondary coach with John Carroll University (Ohio). Staley spent 2014 as the defensive coordinator and linebackers coach at James Madison University (Virginia). Staley was announced as the Defensive Coordinator of the Chattanooga Mocs (Tennessee) in January 2017, but would step away from this role within the same month to pursue NFL opportunities.

=== Chicago Bears ===
In 2017, Staley was hired by the Chicago Bears as their outside linebackers coach.

=== Denver Broncos ===
On January 15, 2019, Staley was hired by the Denver Broncos as their outside linebackers coach, reuniting with then-head coach Vic Fangio.

=== Los Angeles Rams ===
On January 16, 2020, Staley was hired by the Los Angeles Rams as their defensive coordinator, replacing Wade Phillips. In his lone year as defensive coordinator, Staley helped guide the Rams defense to first in points and total yards allowed, positioning himself as an attractive head coaching candidate around the league.

=== Los Angeles Chargers ===
On January 17, 2021, Staley was hired as head coach of the Los Angeles Chargers, replacing Anthony Lynn.

On September 12, 2021, Staley made his head coaching debut against the Washington Football Team and led the Chargers to a 20–16 road victory. Staley led the Chargers to a 9–7 record through the first 16 games of the 2021 season. However, against the Las Vegas Raiders in Week 18 in a win or tie or go home situation, Staley came under scrutiny for two decisions during the game. The first involved a failed fourth down conversion on the Chargers' own 18-yard line, giving the Raiders a short field, which they would score on to extend their lead to six. The second was calling a timeout with 38 seconds left in the overtime period with the Raiders at the Chargers' 39-yard line. Staley claimed that he called the timeout to get the right defensive personnel on the field as the Raiders were running the ball. Following the game, there was conjecture that the timeout proved to be costly for the Chargers as the Raiders kicked a 47-yard field goal as time expired, winning 35–32, and eliminating the Chargers from playoff contention. However, when discussing the moment on a podcast, Raiders' interim head coach at that time Rich Bisaccia stated that "the timeout was really irrelevant".

In the 2022 season, Staley led the Chargers to a 10–7 record, finishing in second place in the AFC West. The Chargers finished as the #5-seed in the AFC and played the #4-seed 9–8 Jacksonville Jaguars on January 14, 2023, in the AFC Wild Card round. The Chargers roared out to a 27–0 second quarter lead, but the Jaguars came back to win the game 31–30 with a field goal as time expired. It was the third-largest comeback in NFL playoff history.

After a 5–9 start to the 2023 season and losing 63–21 to the Raiders on Thursday Night Football in Week 15, Staley was fired on December 15, 2023 along with general manager Tom Telesco. The Chargers-Raiders game set a Chargers franchise record for most points allowed in a single game, along with a Raiders franchise record for most points scored in a single game (doing so just four days after playing in one of the lowest-scoring NFL games in league history, in a 3–0 loss to the Minnesota Vikings).

=== San Francisco 49ers ===
On March 2, 2024, Staley was hired by the San Francisco 49ers. His role as assistant head-coach was revealed on May 22.

=== New Orleans Saints ===
On February 21, 2025, Staley was hired by the New Orleans Saints as their new defensive coordinator under head coach Kellen Moore, whom Staley worked with when he was head coach of the Chargers.

== Head coaching record ==
Team	Year	Regular season					Postseason			
Team	Year	Won	Lost	Ties	Win %	Finish	Won	Lost	Win %	Result
LAC	2021	9	8	0	.529	3rd in AFC West	—	—	—	—
LAC	2022	10	7	0	.588	2nd in AFC West	0	1	.000	Lost to Jacksonville Jaguars in AFC Wild Card Game
LAC	2023	5	9	0	.357	Fired	—	—	—	—
Total		24	24	0	.500		0	1	.000	

== Personal life ==
Staley was diagnosed with Hodgkin lymphoma in 2006 and is considered cancer-free after undergoing chemotherapy. He married Amy Ward in 2011. The couple met in 2007 at Northern Illinois, as Amy staffed the athletic department’s front desk while Brandon was a graduate assistant. They have three sons: Collin, Will, and Grant.
