= Tom Telesco =

American football executive (born 1972)

Cleveland Browns
- Title: Personnel Advisor

Personal information
- Born: December 12, 1972 (age 53); Buffalo, New York, U.S.

Career information
- College: John Carroll (1991–1994)

Career history
- Buffalo Bills (1991–1994) Intern; Carolina Panthers (1995–1996) Scouting assistant; Carolina Panthers (1997) Area scout; Indianapolis Colts (1998–2000) Area scout; Indianapolis Colts (2001–2003) Pro scout; Indianapolis Colts (2004–2005) Director of pro scouting; Indianapolis Colts (2006–2011) Director of player personnel; Indianapolis Colts (2012) Vice president of football operations; San Diego / Los Angeles Chargers (2013–2023) General manager; Las Vegas Raiders (2024) General manager; Cleveland Browns (2026–present) Personnel advisor
- Executive profile at Pro Football Reference

Thomas Francis Telesco (born December 12, 1972) is an American professional football executive who is a personnel advisor for the Cleveland Browns of the National Football League (NFL). He has previously served as the general manager of the Las Vegas Raiders in 2024 and the Los Angeles Chargers from 2013 to 2023.

Telesco began his career as an intern for the Buffalo Bills from 1991 to 1994, a scout for the Carolina Panthers from 1995 to 1997 and was also in various positions with the Indianapolis Colts from 1998 to 2012, the last six years of which he was the team's director of player personnel and vice president of football operations.

== Early life and education ==
Tom Telesco grew up in Hamburg, New York and attended St. Francis High School, where he graduated in 1991.

=== College career ===
Telesco played wide receiver at John Carroll University in Ohio and he was a starter for the school's football team in the Ohio Athletic Conference where he won the championship with the school team in 1994. He graduated in 1995 with a degree and a Bachelor of Business Management.

== Executive career ==
=== Early career ===
Telesco worked as a college summer intern for the Buffalo Bills (1991–94). In 1995, Telesco began his NFL career as a scouting assistant for the Carolina Panthers. He served in that role for two seasons before becoming an area scout in 1997.

=== Indianapolis Colts ===
Telesco joined the Colts as an area scout from 1998 to 2000. He served as a pro scout from 2001 to 2003 before being elevated to the team's director of pro scouting (2004–05). At the conclusion of the 2005 campaign, Telesco moved into the director of player personnel role.

Telesco's tenure with the Colts was one of the most successful eras of the franchise's history and his arrival in 1998 also coincided with the beginning and end of the Peyton Manning era. From 1998 to 2012, the Colts went 154–86 and appeared in the playoffs 12 times, winning eight division titles, while finishing second four times. Those 12 postseason appearances included a victory over Chicago in Super Bowl XLI following the 2006 season and a loss to New Orleans in Super Bowl XLIV after the 2009 season. Indianapolis’ 154 wins from 1998 to 2012 were the second-most in the NFL during that span after New England's 168 wins.

=== San Diego / Los Angeles Chargers ===
On January 9, 2013, Chargers President Dean Spanos chose Tom Telesco as the team's new general manager. Telesco was hired after long time Chargers general manager A. J. Smith was fired in 2013. He inherited a team that had not made the playoffs since 2009 and been underachieving due to injuries and poor depth. At 40 years old, Telesco became the youngest general manager in Chargers history and one of the youngest general managers in the NFL. Telesco said the Chargers would be a draft-driven organization that would use free agents to supplement the roster. He was fired on December 15, 2023, after 11 years with the team, along with coach Brandon Staley, following a lopsided loss to the Las Vegas Raiders, which ended in a 63–21 defeat.

=== Las Vegas Raiders ===
On January 23, 2024, Telesco was named general manager of the Las Vegas Raiders. On January 9, 2025, Telesco was fired by the Raiders.

== Personal life ==
Telesco is married to Larah, and they have three children. Telesco is a friend of David Caldwell, who served as the general manager for the Jacksonville Jaguars from 2013 to 2020. The two knew each other from their days at St. Francis High School, John Carroll University as well as when they were Colts executives. When he was playing for the Blue Streaks football team he was also teammates with Chris Polian and Greg Roman. The 1995 squad also included Josh McDaniels, Nick Caserio and London Fletcher.
