= 2022 Los Angeles Chargers season =

63rd season in franchise history

- Owner: Dean Spanos
- General manager: Tom Telesco
- Head coach: Brandon Staley
- Offensive coordinator: Joe Lombardi
- Defensive coordinator: Renaldo Hill
- Home stadium: SoFi Stadium

Results
- Record: 10–7
- Division place: 2nd AFC West
- Playoffs: Lost Wild Card Playoffs (at Jaguars) 30–31
- All-Pros: SS Derwin James (2nd team)
- Pro Bowlers: SS Derwin James; OLB Khalil Mack

Uniform
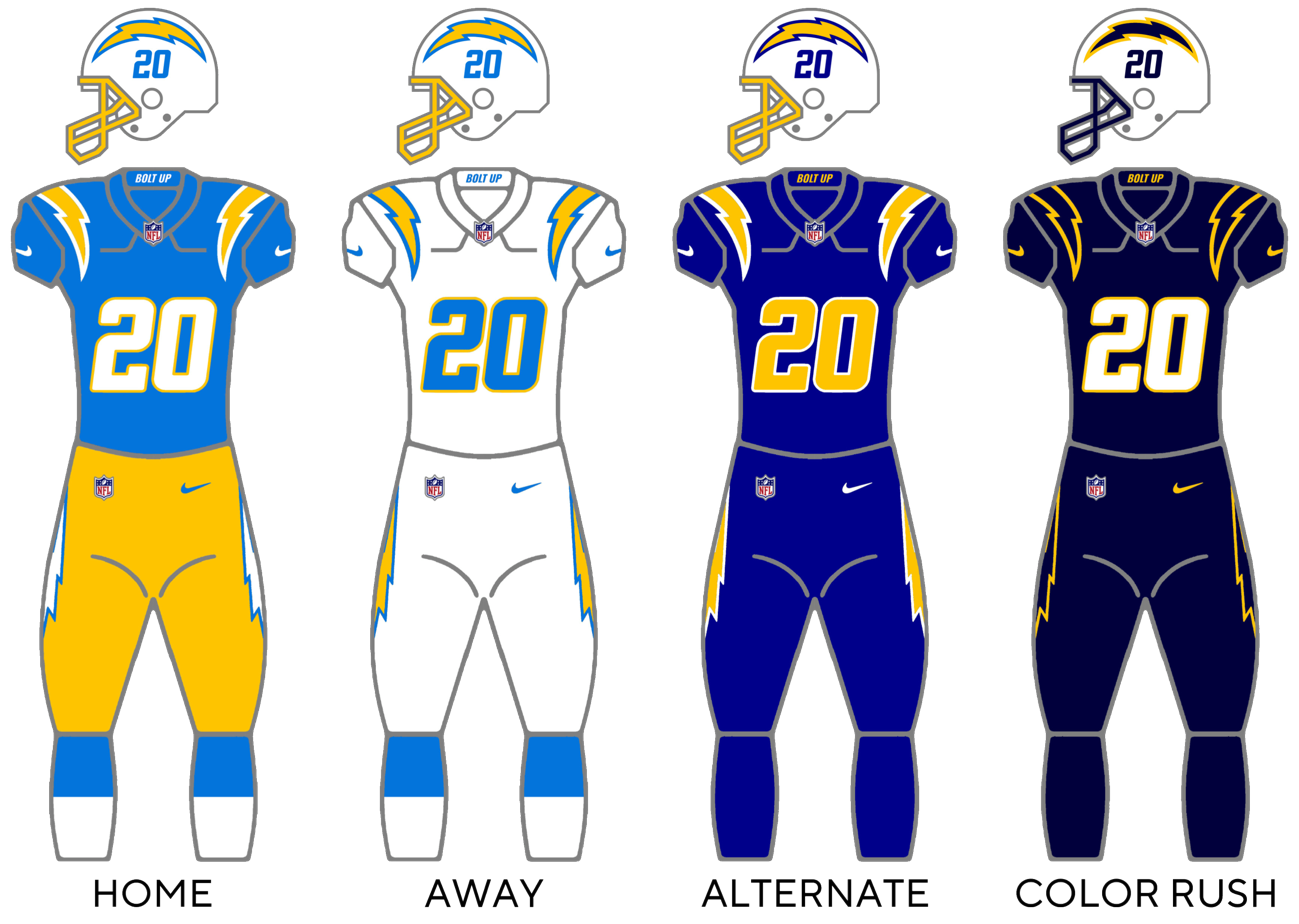

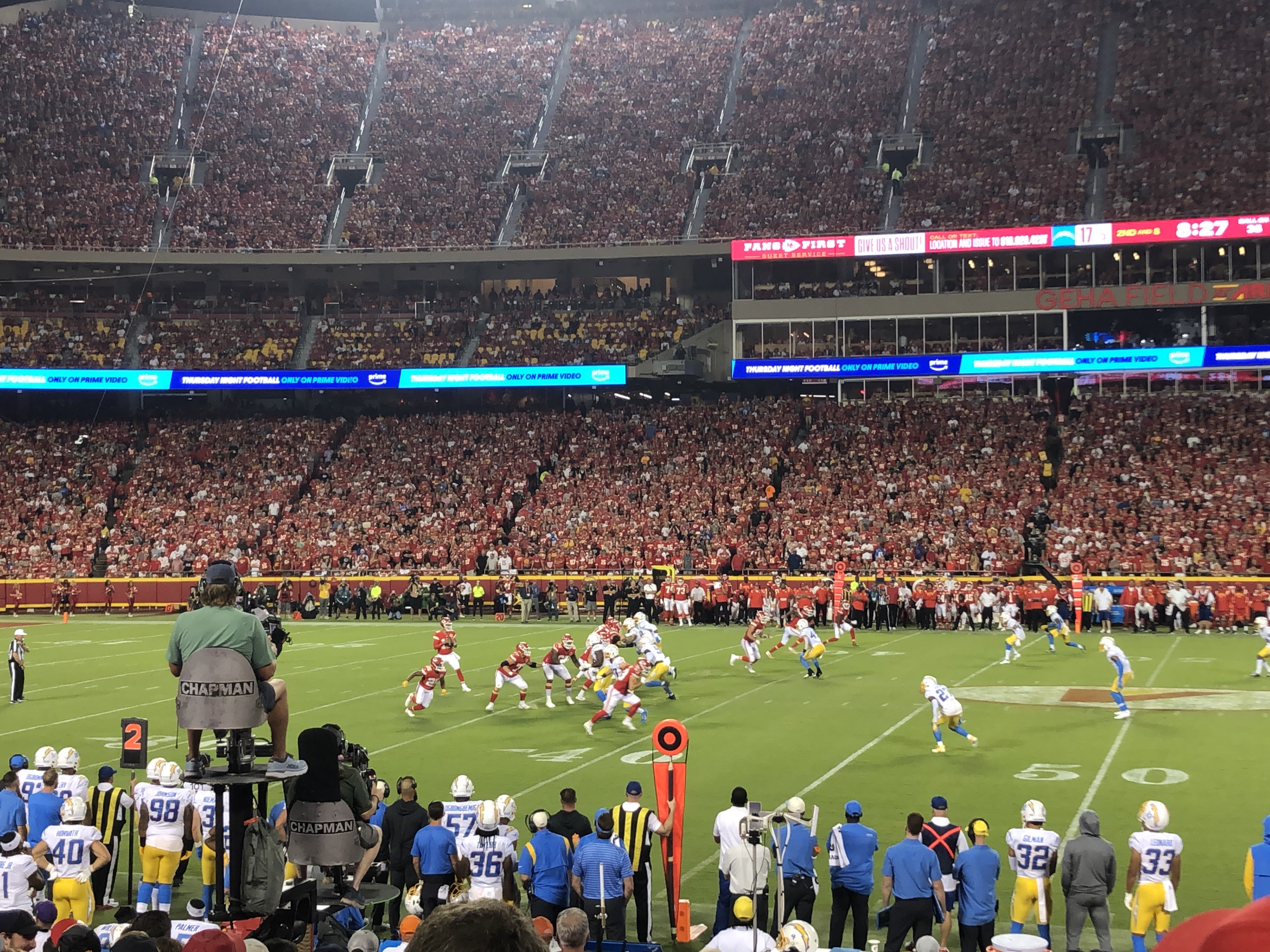
The Chargers and Chiefs playing in the first Thursday Night Football game broadcast exclusively on Amazon Prime Video.

The 2022 season was the Los Angeles Chargers' 53rd in the National Football League (NFL), their 63rd overall, their seventh in the Greater Los Angeles Area, their third playing their home games at SoFi Stadium and their second under head coach Brandon Staley.

The Chargers improved on their 9–8 record from the previous year after a Week 17 win over the Los Angeles Rams. After the Chargers beat the Indianapolis Colts in Week 16, the Chargers clinched a playoff berth for the first time since 2018, their first playoff appearance without Philip Rivers or Drew Brees since 1995 when they were in San Diego. In the Wild Card round, despite amassing a 27–0 lead during the second quarter, the Chargers collapsed in the second half of the game, losing to the Jacksonville Jaguars 31–30 on a last-second field goal. It was the third largest blown lead in NFL postseason history, behind the 1992 Houston Oilers and 2013 Kansas City Chiefs, and it is the biggest blown lead in the history of the Chargers, which was the first time since 2009 that the Chargers went one-and-done and their first Wild Card playoff loss since 2004.

== Roster changes ==
=== Free agency ===
==== Unrestricted ====
Position	Player	2022 team	Date signed	Contract
G	Oday Aboushi	Los Angeles Rams (PS)	September 14, 2022	1 year, $1.12 million
TE	Stephen Anderson	Arizona Cardinals	April 4, 2022	1 year, $1.135 million
TE	Jared Cook			
DE	Christian Covington	Los Angeles Chargers	March 17, 2022	1 year, $1.2725 million
QB	Chase Daniel	Los Angeles Chargers	March 15, 2022	1 year, $2.25 million
OLB	Kyler Fackrell	Las Vegas Raiders	March 21, 2022	1 year, $1.2 million
CB	Chris Harris Jr.	New Orleans Saints (PS)	October 4, 2022	1 year, $358.2 thousand
CB	Davontae Harris	Chicago Bears	August 5, 2022	1 year, $1.035 million
K	Dustin Hopkins	Los Angeles Chargers	March 14, 2022	3 years, $9 million
RB	Justin Jackson	Detroit Lions	August 1, 2022	1 year, $1.035 million
DE	Justin Jones	Chicago Bears	March 18, 2022	2 years, $12 million
NT	Linval Joseph	Philadelphia Eagles	November 16, 2022	1 year, $2 million
G	Senio Kelemete			
OLB	Uchenna Nwosu	Seattle Seahawks	March 16, 2022	2 years, $20 million
LS	Matt Overton	Dallas Cowboys (PS)	October 4, 2022	1 year, $358.2 thousand
C	Scott Quessenberry	Houston Texans	March 16, 2022	1 year, $1.2 million
WR/KR	Andre Roberts	Carolina Panthers	May 2, 2022	1 year, $1.75 million
G	Michael Schofield	Chicago Bears	July 25, 2022	1 year, $1.12 million
CB	Ryan Smith	Indianapolis Colts (PS)	September 27, 2022	1 year, $358.2 thousand
ILB	Kyzir White	Philadelphia Eagles	March 26, 2022	1 year, $5 million

==== Restricted and exclusive-rights ====
Position	Player	Tag	2022 team	Date signed	Contract
P	Ty Long	RFA			
S	Trey Marshall	RFA			
TE	Donald Parham	ERFA	Los Angeles Chargers	March 15, 2021	1 year, $895 thousand
WR	Jalen Guyton	ERFA	Los Angeles Chargers	March 15, 2021	1 year, $965 thousand
T	Storm Norton	ERFA	Los Angeles Chargers	March 15, 2021	1 year, $895 thousand
Restricted Free Agent (RFA): Players with three accrued seasons whose contracts expired at the end of the previous season Exclusive-Rights Free Agent (ERFA): Players with two or fewer accrued seasons whose contracts expired at the end of the previous season

==== Futures ====
Shortly after the end of their 2021 season, the Chargers signed eleven players on their practice squad to reserve/future free agent contracts.

Position	Player	Date signed
WR	Michael Bandy	January 11, 2022
DE	Andrew Brown	January 11, 2022
ILB	Cole Christiansen	January 11, 2022
SS	Ben DeLuca	January 11, 2022
OLB	Emeke Egbule	January 11, 2022
WR	Maurice Ffrench	January 11, 2022
G	Ryan Hunter	January 11, 2022
TE	Hunter Kampmoyer	January 11, 2022
NT	Forrest Merrill	January 11, 2022
WR	Jason Moore	January 11, 2022
T	Foster Sarell	January 11, 2022
WR	Joe Reed	January 18, 2022
DE	Jamal Davis	February 2, 2022

=== Signings ===
Position	Player	Previous team	Date signed	Contract
CB	J. C. Jackson	New England Patriots	March 16, 2022	5 years, $82 million
DT	Austin Johnson	New York Giants	March 16, 2022	2 years, $14 million
DT	Sebastian Joseph-Day	Los Angeles Rams	March 16, 2022	3 years, $24 million
LS	Josh Harris	Atlanta Falcons	March 16, 2022	4 years, $5.6 million
TE	Gerald Everett	Seattle Seahawks	March 20, 2022	2 years, $12 million
P	J. K. Scott	Jacksonville Jaguars	March 21, 2022	1 year, $965 thousand
WR/KR	DeAndre Carter	Washington Football Team	April 8, 2022	1 year, $1.135 million
LB	Troy Reeder	Los Angeles Rams	April 9, 2022	1 year, $1.075 million
C	Will Clapp	New Orleans Saints	April 26, 2022	1 year, $1.035 million
CB	Bryce Callahan	Denver Broncos	May 3, 2022	1 year, $1.12 million
OLB	Kyle Van Noy	New England Patriots	May 5, 2022	1 year, $2.25 million
T	Zack Bailey	Washington Football Team (PS)	May 17, 2022	1 year, $825 thousand
DE	Morgan Fox	Carolina Panthers	May 18, 2022	1 year, $1.1875 million
TE	Sage Surratt	Birmingham Stallions (USFL)	July 31, 2022	1 year, $705 thousand
G	Cameron Hunt	Birmingham Stallions (USFL)	August 9, 2022	1 year, $825 thousand
CB	Michael Jacquet	New York Giants	August 23, 2022	1 year, $825 thousand
RB	Sony Michel	Miami Dolphins	August 31, 2022	1 year, $1.035 million
TE	Richard Rodgers (Note: Signed to the practice squad.)	Philadelphia Eagles	September 5, 2022	1 year, $277.2 thousand
DE	Christian Covington	Practice squad	September 12, 2022	1 year, $1.2725 million
OLB	Derrek Tuszka (Note: Claimed off waivers.)	Tennessee Titans	September 27, 2022	2 years, $1.905 million
WR	Jason Moore	Practice squad	September 28, 2022	
TE	Richard Rodgers	Practice squad	September 28, 2022	
WR	John Hightower	Philadelphia Eagles	September 28, 2022	1 year, $207 thousand
WR	Keelan Doss	New York Giants	October 5, 2022	1 year, $207 thousand
K	Taylor Bertolet	Carolina Panthers (PS)	October 6, 2022	1 year, $207 thousand
WR	Michael Bandy	Practice squad	October 22, 2022	
OLB	Jeremiah Attaochu	Baltimore Ravens (PS)	October 26, 2022	1 year, $1.12 million
CB	Michael Jacquet	Los Angeles Chargers (PS)	October 31, 2022	
K	Cameron Dicker	Philadelphia Eagles	November 3, 2022	1 year, $115 thousand
WR	Keelan Doss	Practice squad	November 5, 2022	1 year, $825 thousand
DE	Breiden Fehoko	Practice squad	November 9, 2022	
DL	Christopher Hinton	New York Giants	November 9, 2022	1 year, $103.5 thousand
T	Austen Pleasants	Carolina Panthers	November 9, 2022	1 year, $103.5 thousand
RB	Larry Rountree	Practice squad	November 12, 2022	
DT	Tyeler Davison	Cleveland Browns (PS)	November 16, 2022	1 year, $497 thousand
DT	David Moa	New York Giants	November 16, 2022	1 year, $92 thousand
DE	Joe Gaziano	Practice squad	November 19, 2022	
K	Cameron Dicker	Practice squad	November 22, 2022	
T	Foster Sarell	Practice squad	November 26, 2022	
DB	Kemon Hall	Practice squad	December 10, 2022	
DL	Christopher Hinton	Practice squad	December 21, 2022	
NT	Aaron Crawford	New York Giants (PS)	December 21, 2022	1 year, $34.5 thousand
WR	Jason Moore	Los Angeles Chargers (PS)	December 21, 2022	
S	Raheem Layne	Practice squad	December 26, 2022	

=== Releases/waivers ===
Position	Player	2022 team	Date released/waived
OT	Bryan Bulaga		March 15, 2022
OT	Andrew Trainer (Note: Placed on injured reserve.)		August 9, 2022
WR	Maurice Ffrench		August 15, 2022
QB	Brandon Peters		August 15, 2022
S	Skyler Thomas		August 15, 2022
NT	Forrest Merrill		August 15, 2022
C	Isaac Weaver		August 15, 2022
K	James McCourt	Jacksonville Jaguars	August 22, 2022
G	Cameron Hunt		August 22, 2022
CB	Tevaughn Campbell	Las Vegas Raiders (PS)	August 23, 2022
ILB	Damon Lloyd		August 23, 2022
OLB	Ty Shelby		August 23, 2022
DE	Christian Covington	Practice squad	August 30, 2022
T	Zack Bailey	Practice squad	August 30, 2022
WR	Michael Bandy	Practice squad	August 30, 2022
WR	Trevon Bradford		August 30, 2022
DE	Andrew Brown	Arizona Cardinals (PS)	August 30, 2022
RB	Leddie Brown		August 30, 2022
ILB	Cole Christiansen	Kansas City Chiefs (PS)	August 30, 2022
DE	Jamal Davis	Montreal Alouettes (CFL)	August 30, 2022
SS	Ben DeLuca		August 30, 2022
OLB	Emeke Egbule		August 30, 2022
DE	Joe Gaziano	Practice squad	August 30, 2022
DB	Kemon Hall	Practice squad	August 30, 2022
G	Ryan Hunter	Toronto Argonauts (CFL)	August 30, 2022
CB	Michael Jacquet	Practice squad	August 30, 2022
TE	Hunter Kampmoyer	Practice squad	August 30, 2022
OLB	Carlo Kemp	Practice squad	August 30, 2022
TE	Erik Krommenhoek		August 30, 2022
S	Raheem Layne	Practice squad	August 30, 2022
LB	Tyreek Maddox-Williams	Practice squad	August 30, 2022
RB	Kevin Marks Jr.		August 30, 2022
WR	Jason Moore	Practice squad	August 30, 2022
FB	Gabe Nabers		August 30, 2022
WR	Joe Reed	Practice squad	August 30, 2022
T	Foster Sarell	Practice squad	August 30, 2022
CB	Brandon Sebastian		August 30, 2022
DB	Mark Webb Jr.	Practice squad	August 30, 2022
TE	Sage Surratt		August 30, 2022
RB	Larry Rountree	Practice squad	August 31, 2022
DE	Breiden Fehoko	Practice squad	September 12, 2022
CB	Michael Jacquet	Practice squad	October 6, 2022
DT	Jerry Tillery	Las Vegas Raiders	November 11, 2022
WR	Keelan Doss	Practice squad	November 19, 2022
OLB	Jeremiah Attaochu	Practice squad	November 26, 2022
RB	Larry Rountree	Practice squad	November 26, 2022
WR	Jason Moore	Practice squad	December 17, 2022
RB	Sony Michel		December 31, 2022

=== Contract extensions ===
Position	Player	Date signed	Contract
WR	Mike Williams	March 8, 2022	3 years, $60 million
S	Derwin James	August 17, 2022	4 years, $76.5 million

=== Player trades ===
Position	Player	From/to	Date traded	For
OLB	Khalil Mack	Chicago Bears	March 16, 2022	2022 second-round and 2023 sixth-round picks

=== Practice squad elevations ===
Each NFL team is permitted to elevate up to two players from the practice squad to the active game day roster per week, with those designated players being allowed to return to the practice squad up to two times without being exposed to waivers. If a practice squad player is elevated to the game day roster for a third time, that player will be required to clear waivers before returning to the practice squad. Teams are also permitted to protect a maximum of four practice squad players to prevent opposing teams from signing those players to their active rosters.

Week	Player(s) promoted	Source
1	WR Jason Moore, TE Richard Rodgers	
2	None	
3	None	
4	WR Michael Bandy	
5	WR Michael Bandy (2), K Taylor Bertolet	
6	WR Michael Bandy (3), T Foster Sarell	
7	K Taylor Bertolet (2)	
9	K Cameron Dicker, CB Kemon Hall	
10	K Cameron Dicker (2), T Foster Sarell (2)	
11	K Cameron Dicker (3), T Foster Sarell (3)	
12	S Raheem Layne	
13	T Zack Bailey	
14	DL Christopher Hinton, S Raheem Layne (2)	
15	DL Christopher Hinton (2), S Raheem Layne (3)	
16	RB Larry Rountree	
17	DL David Moa, RB Larry Rountree (2)	
18	DL David Moa (2), RB Larry Rountree (3)	
Wild Card	DL David Moa (3), RB Larry Rountree (4)	

=== Injuries ===
- July 26: Linebacker Kenneth Murray was placed on the PUP list as he was recovering from an ankle surgery in April. Murray was activated from the PUP list on August 22.
- August 23: The Chargers announced that cornerback J. C. Jackson would miss two to four weeks due to a procedure on his ankle. Jackson made his debut in week 2 against the Kansas City Chiefs.
- September 11: Wide receiver Keenan Allen picked up a hamstring injury during the second quarter of the game against the Las Vegas Raiders and did not return to the game. Allen sat out for the week 2 match-up against the Kansas City Chiefs and returned to practice on September 21.
- September 15: Center Corey Linsley suffered a knee injury and did not play the second half of the game in Kansas City. Right tackle Trey Pipkins injured his ankle and left the game in the second half. Quarterback Justin Herbert sustained a fracture to his rib cartilage during the fourth quarter of the game in Kansas City and was able to finish the game.
- September 25: J. C. Jackson, Corey Linsley, and Keenan Allen were unable to play against the Jacksonville Jaguars. Defensive end Joey Bosa left the game against the Jacksonville Jaguars in the first quarter with a groin injury. Left tackle Rashawn Slater suffered a ruptured left bicep tendon in the third quarter of the game. Wide receiver Jalen Guyton tore his left ACL on the final drive of the game. On September 27, Guyton was placed on season-ending injured reserve.
- September 28: Rashawn Slater was placed on injured reserve with a season-ending injury. Joey Bosa was placed on injured reserve and head coach Brandon Staley announced Bosa would require surgery on a core muscle injury and expected Bosa to return later in the season.
- October 9: Kicker Dustin Hopkins did not play against the Cleveland Browns due to a quadriceps injury.
- October 17: Center Corey Linsley did not play against the Denver Broncos due to food poisoning. Running back Joshua Kelley suffered a sprained MCL in the first quarter against the Denver Broncos. Kicker Dustin Hopkins injured his hamstring in the second quarter and was able to finish the game. Hopkins is expected to miss two-to-four weeks. Kelley was placed on injured reserve on October 22.
- October 19: Tight end Donald Parham and wide receiver Josh Palmer were placed in consussion protocol and were ruled out for the game against the Seattle Seahawks.
- October 23: Cornerback J. C. Jackson suffered a season-ending ruptured patellar tendon in the second quarter against the Seattle Seahawks. Wide receiver Keenan Allen played his first game since his Week 1 hamstring injury. Allen did not play in the second half of the game so as to not risk a re-injury. Edge rusher Chris Rumph was diagnosed with a sprained MCL. Wide receiver Mike Williams suffered a right high ankle sprain in the fourth quarter. Jackson was placed on injured reserve on October 26.
- November 2: Wide receiver Keenan Allen did not practice and was held out of the week 9 game as he was still not fully recovered from his hamstring injury. Tight end Donald Parham and wide receiver Josh Palmer were cleared from concussion protocol and returned to practice.
- November 3: Kicker Taylor Bertolet was placed on the practice squad injured list.
- November 5: Tight end Donald Parham was placed on injured reserve with a hamstring injury.
- November 6: Defensive end Jerry Tillery did not play against the Atlanta Falcons due to a back injury. Nose tackle Austin Johnson injured his left knee in the third quarter and left the game. Johnson was diagnosed with an MCL injury and fractured knee and ruled out for the season. Johnson was placed on injured reserve on November 9. Trey Pipkins aggravated his sprained MCL.

=== NFL draft ===
2022 Los Angeles Chargers draft
Round	Selection	Player	Position	College	Notes
1	17	Zion Johnson	G	Boston College	
2	48	Traded to Chicago (Note: The Chargers traded a second-round selection (48th overall) and a 2023 sixth-round selection to the Chicago Bears in exchange for DE Khalil Mack.)			
3	79	JT Woods	S	Baylor	
4	123	Isaiah Spiller	RB	Texas A&M	
5	160	Otito Ogbonnia	DT	UCLA	
6	195	Jamaree Salyer	G	Georgia	
6	214	Ja'Sir Taylor	CB	Wake Forest	Compensatory selection (Note: The Chargers received one additional selection in the sixth round and three in the seventh (214th, 254th, 255th and 260th overall) compensation for the free agent losses of QB Tyrod Taylor, LB Denzel Perryman, OG Dan Feeney and OT Sam Tevi in 2021.)
7	236	Deane Leonard	CB	Ole Miss	
7	254	Traded to Chicago (Note: The Chargers traded two seventh-round selections (254th and 255th overall) to the Chicago Bears in exchange for a 2023 sixth-round pick they included in the Khalil Mack trade.)			Compensatory selection
7	255	Traded to Chicago			Compensatory selection
7	260	Zander Horvath	FB	Purdue	Compensatory selection

Draft trades

2022 Los Angeles Chargers undrafted free agents
Name	Position	College	Ref.
Trevon Bradford	WR	Oregon State	
Leddie Brown	RB	West Virginia	
Erik Krommenhoek	TE	USC	
Raheem Layne	S	Indiana	
Tyreek Maddox-Williams	LB	Rutgers	
Kevin Marks Jr.	RB	Buffalo	
James McCourt	K	Illinois	
Brandon Peters	QB	Illinois	
Brandon Sebastian	CB	Boston College	
Ty Shelby	OLB	UL Monroe	
Stone Smartt	TE	Old Dominion	
Skyler Thomas	S	Liberty	
Andrew Trainer	OT	William & Mary	
Isaac Weaver	C	Old Dominion	

== Staff ==
=== Coaching changes ===
2022 Los Angeles Chargers Staff Changes
Coach	Position	Reason left	Replacement
Frank Smith	Offensive line coach	Accepted job with Miami Dolphins	Brendan Nugent
Derius Swinton	Special teams coordinator	Fired	Ryan Ficken
Mayur Chaudhari	Special teams assistant coach	Fired	Chris Gould
Dan Shamash	Offensive assistant	Accepted job with New York Jets	Mike Hiestand
N/A	Pass game specialist	N/A (position created)	Tom Arth
N/A	Offensive assistant	N/A (position created)	Pat White

2022 Los Angeles Chargers staff
Front office: Chairman/owner/president – Dean Spanos; Vice chairman – Michael Spanos; Executive vice president/COO/CFO – Jeanne Bonk; CEO/president of business operations – A. G. Spanos; General manager – Tom Telesco; President of football operations – John Spanos; Executive vice president of football administration/player finance – Ed McGuire; Director of pro scouting – Dennis Abraham; Senior director of pro personnel – Louis Clark; Director of player personnel – JoJo Wooden; Director of college scouting – Kevin Kelly; Head coaches: Head coach – Brandon Staley; Special assistant to the head coach – Cody Cejda; Offensive coaches: Offensive coordinator – Joe Lombardi; Passing game coordinator/quarterbacks – Shane Day; Running backs – Derrick Foster; Wide receivers – Chris Beatty; Tight ends – Kevin Koger; Offensive line – Brendan Nugent; Assistant offensive line – Shaun Sarrett; Pass game specialist – Tom Arth; Offensive assistant – Mike Hiestand; Offensive assistant – Pat White; Offensive quality control – Chandler Whitmer	Defensive coaches: Defensive coordinator – Renaldo Hill; Defensive line/run game coordinator – Jay Rodgers; Linebackers – Michael Wilhoite; Outside linebackers – Giff Smith; Secondary – Derrick Ansley; Assistant secondary – Tom Donatell; Defensive assistant – John Timu; Defensive quality control – Isaac Shewmaker; Special teams coaches: Special teams coordinator – Ryan Ficken; Assistant special teams – Chris Gould; Strength and conditioning: Director of sports performance – Anthony Lomando; Head strength and conditioning – Jonathan Brooks; Assistant strength and conditioning – Lucius Jordan

== Final roster ==
2022 Los Angeles Chargers roster
Quarterbacks (QB): 4 Chase Daniel; 10 Justin Herbert; 2 Easton Stick; Running backs (RB): 30 Austin Ekeler; 40 Zander Horvath FB; 25 Joshua Kelley; 28 Isaiah Spiller; Wide receivers (WR): 13 Keenan Allen; 83 Michael Bandy; 1 DeAndre Carter; 5 Josh Palmer; 81 Mike Williams; Tight ends (TE): 7 Gerald Everett; 88 Tre' McKitty; 89 Donald Parham; 48 Stone Smartt	Offensive linemen (OL): 76 Will Clapp C; 71 Matt Feiler G; 64 Brenden Jaimes G; 77 Zion Johnson G; 63 Corey Linsley C; 74 Storm Norton T; 79 Trey Pipkins T; 68 Jamaree Salyer T; 73 Foster Sarell T; Defensive linemen (DL): 90 Tyeler Davison NT; 96 Breiden Fehoko DE; 56 Morgan Fox DE; 91 Christopher Hinton Jr. NT; 69 Sebastian Joseph-Day NT	Linebackers (LB): 97 Joey Bosa OLB; 52 Khalil Mack OLB; 9 Kenneth Murray ILB; 31 Nick Niemann ILB; 57 Amen Ogbongbemiga ILB; 42 Troy Reeder ILB; 94 Chris Rumph II OLB; 49 Drue Tranquill ILB; 59 Derrek Tuszka OLB; 8 Kyle Van Noy ILB; Defensive backs (DB): 24 Nasir Adderley FS; 23 Bryce Callahan CB; 43 Michael Davis CB; 32 Alohi Gilman SS; 3 Derwin James SS; 41 Raheem Layne SS; 33 Deane Leonard CB; 26 Asante Samuel Jr. CB; 36 Ja'Sir Taylor CB; 22 JT Woods FS; Special teams (ST): 15 Cameron Dicker K; 47 Josh Harris LS; 16 J. K. Scott P	Practice squad: 45 Jeremiah Attaochu OLB; 78 Zack Bailey T; 12 Taylor Bertolet K (PS/I); 99 Aaron Crawford NT; 86 Keelan Doss WR; 84 John Hightower WR; 39 Michael Jacquet CB; 87 Hunter Kampmoyer TE; 54 Carlo Kemp OLB; 58 Tyreek Maddox-Williams ILB; 50 David Moa NT; 11 Jason Moore WR; 75 Austen Pleasants G; 80 Joe Reed WR; 34 Larry Rountree III RB; 29 Mark Webb FS; Reserve: 95 Christian Covington DE (IR); 92 Joe Gaziano DE (IR); -- Jalen Guyton WR (IR); 37 Kemon Hall CB (IR); 6 Dustin Hopkins K (IR); 27 J. C. Jackson CB (IR); 98 Austin Johnson NT (IR); 53 Damon Lloyd ILB (IR); 91 Forrest Merrill DE (IR); 93 Otito Ogbonnia NT (IR); 82 Richard Rodgers TE (IR); 70 Rashawn Slater T (IR); 62 Andrew Trainer T (IR); 60 Isaac Weaver C (IR); Rookies in italics 53 active, 14 reserve, 15 practice squad (1 exempt)

=== Team captains ===
- Justin Herbert (QB)
- Austin Ekeler (RB)
- Khalil Mack (OLB)
- Derwin James (SS)

== Preseason ==
The Chargers' preseason opponents and schedule was announced on May 12, 2022. The Chargers held joint practices with the Dallas Cowboys on August 17 and 18 at the Jack Hammett Sports Complex in Costa Mesa, California.

Week	Date	Opponent	Result	Record	Venue	Recap
1	August 13	Los Angeles Rams	L 22–29	0–1	SoFi Stadium	Recap
2	August 20	Dallas Cowboys	L 18–32	0–2	SoFi Stadium	Recap
3	August 26	at New Orleans Saints	L 10–27	0–3	Caesars Superdome	Recap

== Regular season ==
=== Schedule ===
On April 28, during the first round of the 2022 draft, the NFL announced that the Chargers will play at the Kansas City Chiefs during Week 2 on September 15, in the first game of Amazon Prime Video's new Thursday Night Football package.

The Chargers' complete 2022 schedule was announced on May 12. Listed below are the Chargers' opponents for 2022:

Week	Date	Opponent	Result	Record	Venue	Recap
1	September 11	**Las Vegas Raiders**	**W** 24–19	1–0	SoFi Stadium	Recap
2	September 15	at **Kansas City Chiefs**	**L** 24–27	1–1	Arrowhead Stadium	Recap
3	September 25	Jacksonville Jaguars	**L** 10–38	1–2	SoFi Stadium	Recap
4	October 2	at Houston Texans	**W** 34–24	2–2	NRG Stadium	Recap
5	October 9	at Cleveland Browns	**W** 30–28	3–2	FirstEnergy Stadium	Recap
6	October 17	**Denver Broncos**	**W** 19–16 (OT)	4–2	SoFi Stadium	Recap
7	October 23	Seattle Seahawks	**L** 23–37	4–3	SoFi Stadium	Recap
8	Bye					
9	November 6	at Atlanta Falcons	**W** 20–17	5–3	Mercedes-Benz Stadium	Recap
10	November 13	at San Francisco 49ers	**L** 16–22	5–4	Levi's Stadium	Recap
11	November 20	**Kansas City Chiefs**	**L** 27–30	5–5	SoFi Stadium	Recap
12	November 27	at Arizona Cardinals	**W** 25–24	6–5	State Farm Stadium	Recap
13	December 4	at **Las Vegas Raiders**	**L** 20–27	6–6	Allegiant Stadium	Recap
14	December 11	Miami Dolphins	**W** 23–17	7–6	SoFi Stadium	Recap
15	December 18	Tennessee Titans	**W** 17–14	8–6	SoFi Stadium	Recap
16	December 26	at Indianapolis Colts	**W** 20–3	9–6	Lucas Oil Stadium	Recap
17	January 1	Los Angeles Rams	**W** 31–10	10–6	SoFi Stadium	Recap
18	January 8	at **Denver Broncos**	**L** 28–31	10–7	Empower Field at Mile High	Recap

Note: Intra-division opponents are in bold text.

=== Game summaries ===
==== Week 1: vs. Las Vegas Raiders ====
Week 1: Las Vegas Raiders at Los Angeles Chargers – Game summary

Quarter	1	2	3	4	Total
Raiders	3	0	10	6	**19**
**Chargers**	3	14	7	0	**24**

at SoFi Stadium, Inglewood, California

- Date: September 11
- Game time: 1:25 p.m. PDT
- Game weather: None (fixed roof)
- Game attendance: 70,240
- Referee: Shawn Smith
- TV announcers (CBS): Kevin Harlan, Trent Green and Melanie Collins
- Recap, Game Book

Game information

**First quarter**

- LAC – Dustin Hopkins 43-yard field goal, 9:03. Chargers 3–0. **Drive: 12 plays, 50 yards, 5:57.**
- LV – Daniel Carlson 23-yard field goal, 2:29. Tied 3–3. **Drive: 14 plays, 70 yards, 6:34.**

**Second quarter**

- LAC – Zander Horvath 1-yard pass from Justin Herbert (Dustin Hopkins kick), 9:34. Chargers 10–3. **Drive: 9 plays, 67 yards, 3:44.**
- LAC – DeAndre Carter 23-yard pass from Justin Herbert (Dustin Hopkins kick), 0:35. Chargers 17–3. **Drive: 2 plays, 31 yards, 0:10.**

**Third quarter**

- LV – Brandon Bolden 18-yard pass from Derek Carr (Daniel Carlson kick), 12:39. Chargers 17–10. **Drive: 5 plays, 75 yards, 2:21.**
- LAC – Gerald Everett 18-yard pass from Justin Herbert (Dustin Hopkins kick), 6:42. Chargers 24–10. **Drive: 11 plays, 73 yards, 5:57.**
- LV – Daniel Carlson 55-yard field goal, 1:03. Chargers 24–13. **Drive: 11 plays, 38 yards, 5:39.**

**Fourth quarter**

- LV – Davante Adams 3-yard pass from Derek Carr (pass failed), 4:32. Chargers 24–19. **Drive: 7 plays, 61 yards, 3:01.**

**Top passers**

- LV – Derek Carr – 22/37, 295 yards, 2 TD, 3 INT
- LAC – Justin Herbert – 26/34, 279 yards, 3 TD

**Top rushers**

- LV – Josh Jacobs – 10 rushes, 57 yards
- LAC – Austin Ekeler – 14 rushes, 36 yards

**Top receivers**

- LV – Davante Adams – 10 receptions, 141 yards, TD
- LAC – Keenan Allen – 4 receptions, 66 yards

After both teams began the game with a field goal and a punt, Allen had back-to-back catches of 19 and 42 yards, moving the Chargers to the Las Vegas 11 yard line. Three plays later, Herbert gained only 3 yards on a 3rd and 4, but Nate Hobbs was penalised for unnecessary roughness, having hit Herbert as he entered a slide. That gave the Chargers a fresh set of downs, and Horvath's touchdown followed three plays later. On the next Charger drive, Carter's 30-yard catch moved them into Raider territory. They reached a 3rd and 1 at the 28 before both Ekeler and Herbert were stopped for no gain, turning the ball over on downs. On the next two plays, Derek Carr was sacked by Mack and intercepted by Tranquill, who returned the ball 20 yards to the Raider 31. Two plays later, Herbert found Carter between two defenders in the front of the end zone for a 17–3 halftime lead.

A 41-yard catch by Davante Adams helped the Raiders score only five plays into the second half. The Chargers responded with a drive where Herbert completed 6 of 7 passes for 55 yards and a touchdown to Everett. Las Vegas converted a 4th and 4 on their next possession, reaching the Charger 25. The Raiders then tried a trick play, Bosa sacked Adams for a 10-yard and they eventually settled for Daniel Carlson's long field goal. The next two Raider drives ended with interceptions by Samuel (on a deep pass at his own 2), and Callahan (near midfield). The Chargers had a field goal try after the latter of these, but Hopkins was wide left from 49 yards out, and Las Vegas drove 61 yards for an Adams touchdown, trimming the deficit to five points. Nasir Adderley broke up the two-point conversion attempt in the end zone. Following a three-and-out by the Chargers, Las Vegas took over at their own 21 yard line with 3:30 to play. They reached a 3rd and 3 at their own 40 before Carr was sacked on consecutive plays, firstly by Bosa and Morgan Fox, then by Mack. Los Angeles took over on downs, and were able to run the clock out after Michel's 3-yard run on 3rd and 2.

All three Charger touchdowns were scored by players making their debut for the team. Two defensive debutants also contributed: Mack had three of the Chargers' six sacks while Callahan had one of their three interceptions. Los Angeles gained sixteen first downs on their first six drives, but only two from their final five.

==== Week 2: at Kansas City Chiefs ====
Week 2: Los Angeles Chargers at Kansas City Chiefs – Game summary

Quarter	1	2	3	4	Total
Chargers	3	7	7	7	**24**
**Chiefs**	0	7	7	13	**27**

at Arrowhead Stadium, Kansas City, Missouri

- Date: September 15
- Game time: 7:15 p.m. CDT/5:15 p.m. PDT
- Game weather: 81 °F (27 °C)
- Game attendance: 73,461
- Referee: John Hussey
- TV announcers (KTTV/Prime Video): Al Michaels, Kirk Herbstreit, and Kaylee Hartung
- Recap, Game Book

Game information

**First quarter**

- LAC – Dustin Hopkins 31-yard field goal, 5:58. Chargers 3–0. **Drive: 11 plays, 67 yards, 4:41.**

**Second quarter**

- LAC – Zander Horvath 1-yard pass from Justin Herbert (Dustin Hopkins kick), 14:57. Chargers 10–0. **Drive: 8 plays, 58 yards, 3:50.**
- KC – Jerick McKinnon 9-yard pass from Patrick Mahomes (Matt Ammendola kick), 11:38. Chargers 10–7.**Drive: 7 plays, 75 yards, 3:19.**

**Third quarter**

- LAC – Mike Williams 15-yard pass from Justin Herbert (Dustin Hopkins kick), 9:52. Chargers 17–7. **Drive: 11 plays, 75 yards, 5:08.**
- KC – Justin Watson 41-yard pass from Patrick Mahomes (Matt Ammendola kick), 7:22. Chargers 17–14.'**Drive: 7 plays, 75 yards, 2:30.**

**Fourth quarter**

- KC – Matt Ammendola 19-yard field goal, 14:48. Tied 17–17. **Drive: 9 plays, 35 yards, 4:01.**
- KC – Jaylen Watson 99-yard interception return (Matt Ammendola kick), 10:29. Chiefs 24–17.
- KC – Matt Ammendola 32-yard field goal, 3:20. Chiefs 27–17.**Drive: 5 plays, 72 yards, 0:35.**
- LAC – Josh Palmer 7-yard pass from Justin Herbert (Dustin Hopkins kick), 1:11. Chargers 27–24. **Drive: 9 plays, 73 yards, 2:09.**

**Top passers**

- LAC – Justin Herbert – 33/48, 334 yards, 3 TD, INT
- KC – Patrick Mahomes – 24/35, 235 yards, 2 TD

**Top rushers**

- LAC – Austin Ekeler – 14 rushes, 39 yards
- KC – Clyde Edwards-Helaire – 8 rushes, 74 yards

**Top receivers**

- LAC – Austin Ekeler – 9 receptions, 55 yards
- KC – Travis Kelce – 5 receptions, 51 yards

Kansas City were forced to punt on their first two drives, and the Chargers responded with a field goal and a touchdown. On the touchdown drive, Herbert converted a 4th and inches with a quarterback sneak, and Williams caught a 39-yard pass to the Chiefs' 1 yard line; Horvath scored two plays later. A 3rd-down Nasir Adderley interception on the ensuing drive was nullified by an illegal contact penalty on Callahan, leading to Mahomes' first touchdown pass. Los Angeles crossed midfield on their next two possessions, but had to punt both times and led 10–7 at halftime.

The Chargers opened the second half with a 75-yard touchdown drive. Ekeler converted on 3rd and 1 early in the drive, and later on 4th and 1; on the next play, Williams made a juggling one-handed catch in the end zone. Patrick Mahomes threw his next pass directly to Samuel, who initially mishandled the ball before diving forward and gathering it near the ground. Los Angeles were initially awarded the ball at the Kansas City 35, but the turnover was overturned on official review, with some controversy. Mahomes then led the Chiefs to another touchdown. Late in the 3rd quarter, Kansas City had a 3rd and goal at the Charger 1, but Joseph and Bosa stopped Travis Kelce for no gain, and the Chiefs settled for a game-tying field goal. Los Angeles then drove into Chiefs territory, where Everett had back-to-back catch-and-runs of 7 and 26 yards, moving the ball to the 3. Everett asked to be taken out of the game due to fatigue after the second catch, but was unable to leave as the Chargers were in a hurry-up offense. He failed to break on the ball on the next play; Herbert's pass was intercepted and returned 99 yards for a touchdown. Clyde Edwards-Helaire broke off a 52-yard run late in the game, allowing the Chiefs to pad their lead with a field goal. Herbert converted two 4th downs on the next drive, the latter to Palmer for a touchdown, but Kansas City recovered an onside kick and ran out the clock.

Herbert played on after sustaining fractured rib cartilage late in the game. Horvath became the first running back or fullback to score receiving touchdowns in the first two games of his career since 1942.

==== Week 3: vs. Jacksonville Jaguars ====
Week 3: Jacksonville Jaguars at Los Angeles Chargers – Game summary

Quarter	1	2	3	4	Total
**Jaguars**	0	16	15	7	**38**
Chargers	0	7	3	0	**10**

at SoFi Stadium, Inglewood, California

- Date: September 25
- Game time: 1:05 p.m. PDT
- Game weather: None (fixed roof)
- Game attendance: 67,964
- Referee: Craig Wrolstad
- TV announcers (CBS): Greg Gumbel, Adam Archuleta and AJ Ross
- Recap, Game Book

Game information

**First quarter**

- No scoring plays.

**Second quarter**

- JAX – Riley Patterson 22-yard field goal, 14:57. Jaguars 3–0. **Drive: 12 plays, 63 yards, 5:14.**
- JAX – Riley Patterson 23-yard field goal, 13:52. Jaguars 6–0. **Drive: 4 plays, 0 yards, 0:49.**
- JAX – Zay Jones 14-yard pass from Trevor Lawrence (Riley Patterson kick), 10:23. Jaguars 13–0. **Drive: 5 plays, 28 yards, 1:58.**
- LAC – Mike Williams 15-yard pass from Justin Herbert (Dustin Hopkins kick), 6:10. Jaguars 13–7. **Drive: 9 plays, 75 yards, 4:13.**
- JAX – Riley Patterson 23-yard field goal, 1:02. Jaguars 16–7. **Drive: 11 plays, 70 yards, 5:08.**

**Third quarter**

- LAC – Dustin Hopkins 25-yard field goal, 11:51. Jaguars 16–10. **Drive: 10 plays, 68 yards, 3:09.**
- JAX – James Robinson 50-yard run (Riley Patterson kick), 10:38. Jaguars 23–10. **Drive: 5 plays, 75 yards, 1:13.**
- JAX – Christian Kirk 4-yard pass from Trevor Lawrence (Lawrence–Engram pass), 1:15. Jaguars 31–10. **Drive: 14 plays, 60 yards, 8:27.**

**Fourth quarter**

- JAX – Marvin Jones 11-yard pass from Trevor Lawrence (Riley Patterson kick), 4:54. Jaguars 38–10. **Drive: 14 plays, 68 yards, 9:10.**

**Top passers**

- JAX – Trevor Lawrence – 28/39, 262 yards, 3 TD
- LAC – Justin Herbert – 25/45, 297 yards, TD, INT

**Top rushers**

- JAX – James Robinson – 17 rushes, 100 yards, TD
- LAC – Sony Michel – 5 rushes, 22 yards

**Top receivers**

- JAX – Zay Jones – 10 receptions, 85 yards, TD
- LAC – Josh Palmer – 6 receptions, 99 yards

On the game's first drive, the Charger defense forced an incompletion when Jacksonville went for it on 4th and 5 from the Los Angeles 39. They also held the Jaguars to a pair of short field goals, the latter after a Herbert interception; he fumbled while being sacked soon afterwards, setting up the first Jacksonville touchdown. Herbert responded on his next drive by completing 7 of 8 passes for 75 yards and a touchdown to Williams. An Evan Engram touchdown catch was overturned after a lengthy official review, and Jacksonville settled for a field goal and 16–7 halftime lead.

Facing a 3rd and 15 three plays into the second half, Herbert connected with Guyton 54 yards downfield. A completion to Palmer brought up 1st and goal from the 7, from where three Herbert incompletions were followed by a field goal. On the next drive, Jacksonville running back James Robinson broke away for a 50-yard touchdown on 4th and 1. The Jaguars followed this with a pair of 14-play drives as they pulled away.

Los Angeles possessed the ball for only 21:33, and were outgained by 151–26 in rushing yards.

==== Week 4: at Houston Texans ====
Week 4: Los Angeles Chargers at Houston Texans – Game summary

Quarter	1	2	3	4	Total
**Chargers**	7	20	0	7	**34**
Texans	0	7	7	10	**24**

at NRG Stadium, Houston, Texas

- Date: October 2
- Game time: 12:00 p.m. CDT/10:00 a.m. PDT
- Game weather: None (retractable roof closed)
- Game attendance: 69,071
- Referee: Alex Kemp
- TV announcers (CBS): Beth Mowins, James Lofton and Amanda Renner
- Recap, Game Book

Game information

**First quarter**

- LAC – Gerald Everett 18-yard pass from Justin Herbert (Dustin Hopkins kick), 12:00. Chargers 7–0. **Drive: 3 plays, 25 yards, 1:28.**

**Second quarter**

- LAC – Austin Ekeler 10-yard run (Dustin Hopkins kick), 12:57. Chargers 14–0. **Drive: 9 plays, 64 yards, 4:22.**
- LAC – Austin Ekeler 20-yard run (Dustin Hopkins kick), 10:00. Chargers 21–0. **Drive: 3 plays, 73 yards, 1:18.**
- HOU – Dameon Pierce 75-yard run (Kaʻimi Fairbairn kick), 9:48. Chargers 21–7. **Drive: 1 play, 75 yards, 0:12.**
- LAC – Dustin Hopkins 23-yard field goal, 4:35. Chargers 24–7. **Drive: 10 plays, 77 yards, 5:13.**
- LAC – Dustin Hopkins 37-yard field goal, 0:08. Chargers 27–7. **Drive: 9 plays, 49 yards, 0:57.**

**Third quarter**

- HOU – Rex Burkhead 8-yard pass from Davis Mills (Kaʻimi Fairbairn kick), 1:12. Chargers 27–14. **Drive: 8 plays, 87 yards, 4:30.**

**Fourth quarter**

- HOU – Brandin Cooks 18-yard pass from Davis Mills (Kaʻimi Fairbairn kick), 10:02. Chargers 27–21. **Drive: 5 plays, 93 yards, 2:53.**
- HOU – Kaʻimi Fairbairn 40-yard field goal, 8:30. Chargers 27–24. **Drive: 4 plays, -6 yards, 1:28.**
- LAC – Austin Ekeler 14-yard pass from Justin Herbert (Dustin Hopkins kick), 2:28. Chargers 34–24. **Drive: 12 plays, 84 yards, 6:02.**

**Top passers**

- LAC – Justin Herbert – 27/39, 340 yards, 2 TD
- HOU – Davis Mills – 26/35, 246 yards, 2 TD, 2 INT

**Top rushers**

- LAC – Austin Ekeler – 13 rushes, 60 yards, 2 TD
- HOU – Dameon Pierce – 14 rushes, 131 yards, TD

**Top receivers**

- LAC – Mike Williams – 7 receptions, 120 yards
- HOU – Nico Collins – 3 receptions, 82 yards

Nasir Adderley's interception on the third play of the game set up Gerald Everett's 18-yard touchdown reception, which came on 3rd and 3. Houston kicker Kaʻimi Fairbairn missed a 46-yard field goal late in the opening quarter, and the Chargers scored again when Ekeler broke through the right guard area for his first touchdown of the season. He scored again within three minutes: the Texans went three-and-out, Williams was left completely open on a 50-yard catch-and-run, and Ekeler went in on the following play. Houston responded with Dameon Pierce's 75-yard touchdown run on the next play from scrimmage. Following a Dustin Hopkins field goal, the Texans reached a 4th and 1 at the Charger 24. They went for the first down, but Mack sacked Davis Mills for a loss of 8. Bandy had catches of 24 and 25 yards on the next drive, the first two of his career, and Hopkins made it 27–7 at halftime.

Houston came back into the game late in the 3rd quarter and early in the 4th with quick two touchdown drives; combined, they covered 180 yards from only 13 plays. Carter fumbled the ensuing kickoff, with the Texans recovering at the 16. Helped by Tillery's second-down sack, the Charger defense allowed only a field goal, keeping Los Angeles ahead at 27–24 with 8:30 to play. Herbert then led a 12-play drive to restore a margin of comfort. A completion to Williams converted a 3rd and 2, before Staley opted to go for it on 4th and 2 from the Charger 45. Herbert found Ekeler unmarked in the right flat for a 21-yard gain. Also Williams converted a 3rd and 6, and Ekeler's third touchdown came two plays later. Callahan's subsequent interception effectively clinched the win.

Los Angeles gave up 255 total yards on the three Houston touchdown drives but only 91 yards on their other nine drives. Ekeler gained 60 rushing yards and 49 receiving yards to go with his three total touchdowns.

==== Week 5: at Cleveland Browns ====
Week 5: Los Angeles Chargers at Cleveland Browns – Game summary

Quarter	1	2	3	4	Total
**Chargers**	3	14	10	3	**30**
Browns	14	7	7	0	**28**

at FirstEnergy Stadium, Cleveland, Ohio

- Date: October 9
- Game time: 1:00 p.m. EDT/10:00 a.m. PDT
- Game weather: Sunny, 59 °F (15 °C)
- Game attendance: 67,431
- Referee: Adrian Hill
- TV announcers (CBS): Greg Gumbel, Adam Archuleta and AJ Ross
- Recap, Game Book

Game information

**First quarter**

- CLE – Nick Chubb 41-yard run (Cade York kick), 12:01. Browns 7–0. **Drive: 5 plays, 75 yards, 2:59.**
- CLE – Amari Cooper 11-yard pass from Jacoby Brissett (Cade York kick), 4:01. Browns 14–0. **Drive: 9 plays, 72 yards, 4:51.**
- LAC – Taylor Bertolet 28-yard field goal, 2:26. Browns 14–3. **Drive: 5 plays, 66 yards, 1:35.**

**Second quarter**

- LAC – Joshua Kelley 5-yard run (Taylor Bertolet kick), 13:39. Browns 14–10. **Drive: 5 plays, 75 yards, 2:02.**
- LAC – Austin Ekeler 12-yard pass from Justin Herbert (Taylor Bertolet kick), 5:51. Chargers 17–14. **Drive: 12 plays, 99 yards, 6:00.**
- CLE – Nick Chubb 2-yard run (Cade York kick), 2:55. Browns 21–17. **Drive: 6 plays, 75 yards, 2:56.**

**Third quarter**

- LAC – Austin Ekeler 22-yard run (Taylor Bertolet kick), 10:21. Chargers 24–21. **Drive: 9 plays, 75 yards, 4:39.**
- LAC – Taylor Bertolet 25-yard field goal, 5:47. Chargers 27–21. **Drive: 7 plays, 23 yards, 3:04.**
- CLE – Kareem Hunt 2-yard run (Cade York kick), 0:55. Browns 28–27. **Drive: 11 plays, 75 yards, 4:52.**

**Fourth quarter**

- LAC – Taylor Bertolet 27-yard field goal, 9:29. Chargers 30–28. **Drive: 13 plays, 66 yards, 6:26.**

**Top passers**

- LAC – Justin Herbert – 22/34, 228 yards, TD
- CLE – Jacoby Brissett – 21/34, 230 yards, TD, INT

**Top rushers**

- LAC – Austin Ekeler – 16 rushes, 173 yards, TD
- CLE – Nick Chubb – 17 rushes, 134 yards, 2 TD

**Top receivers**

- LAC – Mike Williams – 10 receptions, 134 yards
- CLE – Amari Cooper – 7 receptions, 76 yards, TD

Cleveland took the lead five plays into the game when Nick Chubb broke numerous tackles on a 41-yard touchdown run. In response, Los Angeles reached a 4th and 2 from the Cleveland 28, but Herbert threw incomplete and the Browns drove 72 yards to double their lead. On the next play from scrimmage, Ekeler broke away on a 71-yard run, eventually being tackled from behind at the Cleveland 4. The Chargers were unable to take full advantage of the opportunity, and settled for a Taylor Bertolet field goal. After a Cleveland three-and-out, Williams' 38-yard catch moved the Chargers into opposition territory, eventually leading to Kelley's touchdown. The Browns again went three-and-out, this time pinning Los Angeles at their own 1-yard line with a Corey Bojorquez punt. The Chargers then produced their first 99-yard touchdown drive since the 2017 season, doing so without facing a 3rd down. Ekeler had back-to-back carries of 10 and 15 yards in the middle of the drive, and finished it by making a one-handed catch and completing a 12-yard touchdown. Cleveland retook the lead with Chubb's second touchdown run, one play after Joseph-Day was flagged for roughing the passer on a 3rd-down incompletion. The Browns had a chance to extend their lead before halftime, but Cade York's 45-yard attempt missed wide right, leaving the score at 21–17.

On the opening drive of the second half, Herbert and Williams connected for 21 yards to convert a 3rd and 12. Williams later had a 22-yard touchdown catch overruled due to having a foot out of bounds, but Ekeler scored on the next play. Soon afterwards, Cleveland went for it on 4th and 1 from their own 34, but Covington broke through the line and tackled Kareem Hunt for a loss of 4, setting up another field goal. Hunt scored on the following drive, putting Cleveland up 28–27 late in the 3rd quarter. Runs of 16 yards by Ekeler and 17 yards by Kelley then helped the Chargers drive inside Cleveland's 10, where they had to settle for their third short field goal of the game. Jacoby Brissett converted a pair of 3rd downs on the following drive, but his pass on 3rd and 7 from the 9 was intercepted by Gilman with 2:44 to play. A 19-yard Williams catch gave the Chargers a first down, before they reached a 4th down with between 1 yard to 2 yards required; 1:14 remained, and Cleveland had used all their timeouts. Staley opted to go for a game-clinching conversion, but Herbert's pass to Williams was broken up, and the Browns took over at the Los Angeles 45. Brissett managed a 10-yard completion, but could move the ball no closer, and York's 54-yard kick missed narrowly to the right with 11 seconds to play.

Staley's 4th-down decision generated controversy after the game. The Los Angeles Times described the call as 'odd', and the injured Allen tweeted 'WTF are we doing?', though he deleted the tweet after talking with Staley. Sports analytics engines largely favored Staley's choice. Ekeler's 173 rushing yards were a new career high. As a team, the Chargers ran for 238 yards after gaining a league-worst 258 yards from their first four games.

==== Week 6: vs. Denver Broncos ====
Week 6: Denver Broncos at Los Angeles Chargers – Game summary

Quarter	1	2	3	4	OT	Total
Broncos	10	3	0	3	0	**16**
**Chargers**	0	10	3	3	3	**19**

at SoFi Stadium, Inglewood, California

- Date: October 17
- Game time: 5:15 p.m. PDT
- Game weather: None (fixed roof)
- Game attendance: 70,240
- Referee: Ronald Torbert
- TV announcers (KABC-TV/ESPN): Joe Buck, Troy Aikman and Lisa Salters
- Recap, Game Book

Game information

**First quarter**

- DEN – Brandon McManus 51-yard field goal, 7:20. Broncos 3–0. **Drive: 8 plays, 46 yards, 5:11.**
- DEN – Greg Dulcich 39-yard pass from Russell Wilson (Brandon McManus kick), 1:49. Broncos 10–0. **Drive: 7 plays, 84 yards, 3:41.**

**Second quarter**

- LAC – Austin Ekeler 6-yard run (Dustin Hopkins kick), 9:09. Broncos 10–7. **Drive: 15 plays, 82 yards, 7:40.**
- LAC – Dustin Hopkins 37-yard field goal, 0:53. Tied 10–10. **Drive: 14 plays, 69 yards, 6:36.**
- DEN – Brandon McManus 27-yard field goal, 0:00. Broncos 13–10. **Drive: 7 plays, 66 yards, 0:53.**

**Third quarter**

- LAC – Dustin Hopkins 31-yard field goal, 9:08. Tied 13–13. **Drive: 9 plays, 60 yards, 4:19.**

**Fourth quarter**

- DEN – Brandon McManus 48-yard field goal, 8:21. Broncos 16–13. **Drive: 4 plays, 0 yards, 2:07.**
- LAC – Dustin Hopkins 35-yard field goal, 3:58. Tied 16–16. **Drive: 10 plays, 58 yards, 4:23.**

**Overtime**

- LAC – Dustin Hopkins 39-yard field goal, 2:38. Chargers 19–16. **Drive: 4 plays, 7 yards, 2:08.**

**Top passers**

- DEN – Russell Wilson – 15/28, 188 yards, TD
- LAC – Justin Herbert – 37/57, 238 yards, INT

**Top rushers**

- DEN – Latavius Murray – 15 rushes, 66 yards
- LAC – Austin Ekeler – 14 rushes, 36 yards, TD

**Top receivers**

- DEN – Jerry Jeudy – 3 receptions, 54 yards
- LAC – Austin Ekeler – 10 receptions, 47 yards

Palmer drew a 30-yard pass interference penalty on the game's first play, and Bandy converted a 4th and 2 with and 4-yard catch, but the Chargers were pushed back by a Calpp false start and had to punt. A 21-yard pass interference call no Jackson then converted a Denver 3rd and 14; the Broncos reached a 3rd and 1 at the Los Angeles 29 before Mack sacked Russell Wilson and Brandon McManus kicked his first field goal. Denver faced a 3rd and 1 from their own 24 late in the opening quarter; Wilson completed consecutive passes of 37 and 39 yards, the latter for a touchdown and a 10–0 lead. Los Angeles responded with their only touchdown drive of the game. It featured four 3rd-down conversions – three via short completions from Herbert and one when Ekeler drove through the middle of the line for the touchdown. After a Denver three-and-out, the Chargers had another lengthy scoring drive, prolonged by pass interference penalties of 36 and 11 yards, both on 3rd down. They reached the Denver 12 before being pushed back by a sack on Herbert, and taking a field goal with 53 seconds to play in the half. A 47-yard Wilson completion helped the Broncos move into range for another McManus field goal, and a 13–10 halftime lead.

Los Angeles tied the score on their first possession of the second half; on their second, they reached a 4th and 2 at the Denver 29, but Herbert's pass was incomplete on the opening play of the final quarter. After a Denver punt, Herbert's next pass was deflected and intercepted, setting the Broncos up at the Charger 30. A Tranquill sack on 3rd down forced Denver to settle for another field goal. Unnecessary roughness and pass interference penalties by Denver contributed 35 yards to the ensuing Chargers drive, which ended with Hopkins' third field goal with four minutes to play. Both teams had one further possession in overtime: Tranquill again sacked Wilson on 3rd down to force a punt, and Herbert's pass from his own 44 fell incomplete as time expired.

Denver won the overtime coin toss and received the ball. Both teams then went three-and-out twice. After the last of these, the Chargers recovered a muffed punt at the Denver 28; Ja'Sir Taylor pushed his blocker back into the returner, who stumbled and failed to gather the ball, allowing Deane Leonard to recover. After Ekeler twice lost a yard, Herbert and Williams connected for 9 yards. Hopkins then made the winning kick, 7:22 into the extra period.

Hopkins made all four of his field goals despite injuring his hamstring while making his 2nd-quarter extra point. The Chargers' two longest gains on offense were both pass interference penalties. They had a 38:49 to 28:33 advantage in time of possession, including 12:27 to 2:33 in the 2nd quarter. Los Angeles had four sacks, all coming on 3rd down plays.

==== Week 7: vs. Seattle Seahawks ====
Week 7: Seattle Seahawks at Los Angeles Chargers – Game summary

Quarter	1	2	3	4	Total
**Seahawks**	17	7	3	10	**37**
Chargers	0	14	0	9	**23**

at SoFi Stadium, Inglewood, California

- Date: October 23
- Game time: 1:25 p.m. PDT
- Game weather: None (fixed roof)
- Game attendance: 70,240
- Referee: Land Clark
- TV announcers (Fox): Kevin Kugler, Mark Sanchez and Laura Okmin
- Recap, Game Book

Game information

**First quarter**

- SEA – Marquise Goodwin 20-yard pass from Geno Smith (Jason Myers kick), 7:29. Seahawks 7–0. **Drive: 8 plays, 68 yards, 4:11.**
- SEA – Kenneth Walker III 12-yard run (Jason Myers kick), 4:17. Seahawks 14–0. **Drive: 4 plays, 43 yards, 1:09.**
- SEA – Jason Myers 46-yard field goal, 1:08. Seahawks 17–0. **Drive: 4 plays, 9 yards, 1:26.**

**Second quarter**

- LAC – Austin Ekeler 7-yard run (Taylor Bertolet kick), 12:44. Seahawks 17–7. **Drive: 8 plays, 75 yards, 3:24.**
- LAC – Mike Williams 13-yard pass from Justin Herbert (Taylor Bertolet kick), 9:37. Seahawks 17–14. **Drive: 6 plays, 33 yards, 2:23.**
- SEA – Marquise Goodwin 23-yard pass from Geno Smith (Jason Myers kick), 1:40. Seahawks 24–14. **Drive: 7 plays, 73 yards, 2:43.**

**Third quarter**

- SEA – Jason Myers 34-yard field goal, 1:06. Seahawks 27–14. **Drive: 17 plays, 77 yards, 10:20.**

**Fourth quarter**

- LAC – Safety, Kenneth Walker III tackled in end zone, 14:17. Seahawks 27–16.
- SEA – Jason Myers 50-yard field goal, 9:09. Seahawks 30–16. **Drive: 7 plays, 31 yards, 3:38.**
- SEA – Kenneth Walker III 74-yard run (Jason Myers kick), 6:56. Seahawks 37–16. **Drive: 1 plays, 74 yards, 0:12.**
- LAC – Austin Ekeler 1-yard pass from Justin Herbert (Taylor Bertolet kick), 3:22. Seahawks 37–23. **Drive: 11 plays, 75 yards, 3:34.**

**Top passers**

- SEA – Geno Smith – 20/27, 210 yards, 2 TD, INT
- LAC – Justin Herbert – 33/51, 293 yards, 2 TD, INT

**Top rushers**

- SEA – Kenneth Walker III – 23 rushes, 168 yards, 2 TD
- LAC – Austin Ekeler – 9 rushes, 31 yards, TD

**Top receivers**

- SEA – Tyler Lockett – 7 receptions, 45 yards
- LAC – Austin Ekeler – 12 receptions, 96 yards, TD

Kenneth Murray intercepted a tipped Geno Smith pass four plays into the game, setting the Chargers up at the Seattle 41. After three plays gained 9 yards, Ekeler was stuffed for no gain on a 4th and 1. Seattle's next drive was prolonged when Callahan was flagged for pass interference on 3rd and 13 and finished with Smith's 20-yard touchdown pass on 3rd and 14. Herbert threw an interception and lost a fumble on the next two Charger drives, setting up 10 further Seattle points. Herbert completed 5 of 6 passes for 64 yards on the following drive, converting a 3rd down with a completion to Allen, who played for the first time since Week 1. Mack recovered a botched snap at the Seattle 33 two plays later, and Herbert converted two further 3rd downs with passes, the latter to Williams for the touchdown. Seattle responded late in the half with Smith's second touchdown pass and led 24–14 at the break.

Los Angeles punted on their first drive of the second half, Scott pinning Seattle at their 7. The Seahawks responded with a 10-minute drive that penetrated inside the Charger 10-yard line before a Fox sack forced them to take a short field goal. Early in the final quarter, Scott produced another good punt, this time pinning Seattle at their own 2. On the following play, Joseph and Troy Reeder stopped Kenneth Walker III in the end zone for a safety. After another Seahawks field goal, Los Angeles reached a 4th and 13 at the Seattle 38. Williams caught Herbert's pass, but gained only 12 yards and severely twisted his ankle while being tackled. Walker broke away for the clinching touchdown a play later. Los Angeles did score once more through Ekeler's 4th-down catch, but Seattle recovered an onside kick and ran out the clock.

==== Week 9: at Atlanta Falcons ====
Week 9: Los Angeles Chargers at Atlanta Falcons – Game summary

Quarter	1	2	3	4	Total
**Chargers**	0	14	0	6	**20**
Falcons	10	0	7	0	**17**

at Mercedes-Benz Stadium, Atlanta, Georgia

- Date: November 6
- Game time: 1:00 p.m. EST/10:00 a.m. PST
- Game weather: Cloudy, 80 °F (27 °C) (retractable roof open)
- Game attendance: 69,299
- Referee: John Hussey
- TV announcers (Fox): Kenny Albert, Jonathan Vilma and Shannon Spake
- Recap, Game Book

Game information

**First quarter**

- ATL – Cordarrelle Patterson 1-yard run (Younghoe Koo kick), 10:40. Falcons 7–0. **Drive: 8 plays, 75 yards, 4:20.**
- ATL – Younghoe Koo 29-yard field goal, 0:52. Falcons 10–0. **Drive: 14 plays, 70 yards, 8:22.**

**Second quarter**

- LAC – Austin Ekeler 2-yard run (Cameron Dicker kick), 4:38. Falcons 10–7. **Drive: 15 plays, 83 yards, 8:35.**
- LAC – Austin Ekeler 1-yard pass from Justin Herbert (Cameron Dicker kick), 0:32. Chargers 14–10. **Drive: 10 plays, 63 yards, 1:56.**

**Third quarter**

- ATL – Cordarrelle Patterson 3-yard run (Younghoe Koo kick), 3:44. Falcons 17–14. **Drive: 10 plays, 53 yards, 4:43.**

**Fourth quarter**

- LAC – Cameron Dicker 31-yard field goal, 5:27. Tied 17–17. **Drive: 14 plays, 47 yards, 6:45.**
- LAC – Cameron Dicker 37-yard field goal, 0:00. Chargers 20–17. **Drive: 3 plays, 24 yards, 0:34.**

**Top passers**

- LAC – Justin Herbert – 30/43, 245 yards, TD, INT
- ATL – Marcus Mariota – 12/23, 129 yards

**Top rushers**

- LAC – Austin Ekeler – 14 rushes, 47 yards, TD
- ATL – Tyler Allgeier – 10 rushes, 99 yards

**Top receivers**

- LAC – Josh Palmer – 8 receptions, 106 yards
- ATL – Kyle Pitts – 2 receptions, 27 yards

Atlanta had a 44-yard run on the game's third play, eventually leading to Cordarrelle Patterson's touchdown on 3rd and goal from the 1. The Falcons added a lengthy field goal drive after Los Angeles went three-and-out. Following an exchange of punts, the Chargers faced a 3rd and 15 at their own 12, but Herbert found an open Palmer for 25 yards. Further 3rd downs were converted with passes to Palmer, Everett and Bandy, before Ekeler scored from the 2. After an Atlanta three-and out, Herbert converted 3rd downs with completions to Ekeler and Carter, then threw to Ekeler in the right flat for a 14–10 halftime lead.

Patterson appeared to have scored a 38-yard touchdown early in the 3rd quarter, but it was nullified by penalty. Atlanta progress to a 2nd and 2 at the Charger 11, from where Marcus Mariota threw a 5-yard pass to Drake London. The receiver was fighting for extra yardage when Mack pulled the ball from his grasp and returned it 44 yards to midfield. Three plays later, Palmer was unable to hold a Herbert pass, which deflected off his hands and was intercepted. Atlanta converted the turnover into seven points when Patterson ran over Tranquill on 3rd and goal from the 3. In the final quarter, Younghoe Koo missed a 50-yard field goal for the Falcons, and Los Angeles advanced to a 3rd and 3 from the Atlanta 37. Ekeler was then initially ruled to have avoided touching the ground while being tackled a yard behind the line of scrimmage; he ran clear for a touchdown that was overturned when replays showed his left elbow graze the turf. Herbert and Carter connected for 6 yards to convert the ensuing 4th and 4, leading to a game-tying field goal for Cameron Dicker. After forcing a punt, the Chargers ran the clock down to 46 seconds while driving to the Atlanta 22. As the Falcons had no timeouts left, Los Angeles could run the clock down and kick a field goal, but Ekeler had the ball knocked loose as he dove forward to the 20. Ta'Quon Graham recovered for the Falcons and returned the ball for 19 yards before fumbling without being touched; Matt Feiler recovered at the Atlanta 43. Herbert immediately found Palmer for 22 yards to move Los Angeles back into field goal range, and Dicker made the winning kick two plays later.

The teams dominated alternating quarters. In term of first downs gained, Atlanta had advantages of 9–0 in the 1st quarter and 8–1 in the 3rd, while Los Angeles had advantages of 11–0 in the 2nd quarter and 7–2 edge in the 4th. Dicker was the 2022 Chargers' third different kicker to make a game-winning field goal in the 4th quarter or overtime, following Bertolet in Week 5 and Hopkins in Week 6. It was also Dicker's second game-winning field goal in two career games, having accomplished the same feat while playing for the Philadelphia Eagles in Week 5. Los Angeles became the third team in NFL history to trail by at least 10 points after the opening quarter of four consecutive games, following the Denver Broncos of 1962 and 1963, and the Tampa Bay Buccaneers of 1988.

==== Week 10: at San Francisco 49ers ====
Week 10: Los Angeles Chargers at San Francisco 49ers – Game summary

Quarter	1	2	3	4	Total
Chargers	7	9	0	0	**16**
**49ers**	3	7	3	9	**22**

at Levi's Stadium, Santa Clara, California

- Date: November 13
- Game time: 5:20 p.m. PST
- Game weather: Clear, 58 °F (14 °C)
- Game attendance: 71,709
- Referee: Shawn Smith
- TV announcers (NBC): Mike Tirico, Cris Collinsworth and Melissa Stark
- Recap, Game Book

Game information

**First quarter**

- LAC – DeAndre Carter 32-yard pass from Justin Herbert (Cameron Dicker kick), 11:35. Chargers 7–0. **Drive: 7 plays, 75 yards, 3:25.**
- SF – Robbie Gould 20-yard field goal, 4:10. Chargers 7–3. **Drive: 14 plays, 67 yards, 7:25.**

**Second quarter**

- LAC – Cameron Dicker 47-yard field goal, 14:52. Chargers 10–3. **Drive: 4 plays, 3 yards, 0:42.**
- LAC – Cameron Dicker 25-yard field goal, 6:25. Chargers 13–3. **Drive: 9 plays, 39 yards, 3:43.**
- SF – Jimmy Garoppolo 1-yard run (Robbie Gould kick), 1:57. Chargers 13–10. **Drive: 9 plays, 75 yards, 4:45.**
- LAC – Cameron Dicker 40-yard field goal, 0:00. Chargers 16–10. **Drive: 11 plays, 54 yards, 1:57.**

**Third quarter**

- SF – Robbie Gould 26-yard field goal, 8:02. Chargers 16–13. **Drive: 12 plays, 67 yards, 6:08.**

**Fourth quarter**

- SF – Christian McCaffrey 2-yard run, (kick failed) 7:54. 49ers 19–16. **Drive: 14 plays, 74 yards, 6:59.**
- SF – Robbie Gould 20-yard field goal, 0:58. 49ers 22–16. **Drive: 4 plays, 6 yards, 0:19.**

**Top passers**

- LAC – Justin Herbert – 21/35, 196 yards, TD, INT
- SF – Jimmy Garoppolo – 19/28, 240 yards

**Top rushers**

- LAC – Austin Ekeler – 6 rushes, 24 yards
- SF – Elijah Mitchell – 18 rushes, 89 yards

**Top receivers**

- LAC – DeAndre Carter – 4 receptions, 64 yards, TD
- SF – Brandon Aiyuk – 6 receptions, 84 yards

The Chargers reversed their recent 1st-quarter struggles by scoring on the game's opening possession. Herbert had completions of 14 yards to Ekeler and 17 yards to Everett, both on 3rd down, then found Carter in the end zone for a 32-yard touchdown, the Chargers' longest of the season. After San Francisco responded with a short field goal, Samuel swung a 49ers receiver into James, popping the ball loose; Samuel recovered the fumble himself in 49ers territory. Los Angeles moved the ball only 3 yards, but Dicker restored their seven-point lead when his 47-yard kick crept just inside the right upright. Later, Nick Niemann deflected a punt, and the Chargers took over in opposition territory. Five plays later, Carter was tackled at the 2-yard line on a 35-yard catch-and-run. Hindered by a Foster Sarell false start penalty, Los Angeles could only manage a field goal from there. After a 49ers touchdown, Salyer kept a Los Angeles drive going by recovering Herbert's fumble. Two plays later, Herbert drew a 15-yard unnecessary roughness penalty when he was hit while scrambling. That moved the ball to the San Francisco 20 with 30 seconds left in the half, but Herbert was temporarily knocked out of the game and backup Chase Daniel could move the ball no closer. Dicker's third field goal made it 16–10 at halftime.

Herbert returned for the Los Angeles failed to score in the second half, picking up only three first downs in five possessions and advancing no further than the San Francisco 44. The 49ers scored a field goal in the 3rd quarter, then converted three 3rd downs on their go-ahead 4th-quarter touchdown drive. With two minutes left, San Francisco pinned the Chargers at their own 1 with a punt. After gaining 7 yards on three plays, Los Angeles turned the ball over on downs when Herbert was hit as he passed and Palmer couldn't pull in his wild throw. After using all their timeouts and holding San Francisco to a field goal, they had one more chance, but Herbert was immediately intercepted.

Los Angeles possessed the ball for only 2:22 in the final quarter, running eight plays for 10 yards.

==== Week 11: vs. Kansas City Chiefs ====
Week 11: Kansas City Chiefs at Los Angeles Chargers – Game summary

Quarter	1	2	3	4	Total
**Chiefs**	6	7	3	14	**30**
Chargers	10	10	0	7	**27**

at SoFi Stadium, Inglewood, California

- Date: November 20
- Game time: 5:20 p.m. PST
- Game weather: 67 °F (19 °C) (fixed roof)
- Game attendance: 70,240
- Referee: Shawn Hochuli
- TV announcers (NBC): Mike Tirico, Cris Collinsworth and Melissa Stark
- Recap, Game Book

Game information

**First quarter**

- KC – Harrison Butker 33-yard field goal, 10:54. Chiefs 3–0. **Drive: 11 plays, 60 yards, 4:06.**
- LAC – Josh Palmer 50-yard pass from Justin Herbert (Cameron Dicker kick), 9:33. Chargers 7–3. **Drive: 3 plays, 75 yards, 1:21.**
- KC – Harrison Butker 52-yard field goal, 5:58. Chargers 7–6. **Drive: 7 plays, 41 yards, 3:35.**
- LAC – Cameron Dicker 46-yard field goal, 2:35. Chargers 10–6. **Drive: 9 plays, 47 yards, 3:23.**

**Second quarter**

- KC – Travis Kelce 4-yard pass from Patrick Mahomes (Harrison Butker kick), 14:13. Chiefs 13–10. **Drive: 7 plays, 75 yards, 3:22.**
- LAC – Austin Ekeler 1-yard run (Cameron Dicker kick), 3:31. Chargers 17–13. **Drive: 13 plays, 70 yards, 7:03.**
- LAC – Cameron Dicker 21-yard field goal, 0:14. Chargers 20–13. **Drive: 9 plays, 58 yards, 2:27.**

**Third quarter**

- KC – Harrison Butker 30-yard field goal, 6:22. Chargers 20–16. **Drive: 9 plays, 56 yards, 4:50.**

**Fourth quarter**

- KC – Travis Kelce 32-yard pass from Patrick Mahomes (Harrison Butker kick), 14:50. Chiefs 23–20. **Drive: 10 plays, 86 yards, 4:55.**
- LAC – Josh Palmer 6-yard pass from Justin Herbert (Cameron Dicker kick), 1:46. Chargers 27–23. **Drive: 10 plays, 64 yards, 5:01.**
- KC – Travis Kelce 17-yard pass from Patrick Mahomes (Harrison Butker kick), 0:31. Chiefs 23–20. **Drive: 6 plays, 75 yards, 1:15.**

**Top passers**

- KC – Patrick Mahomes – 20/34, 329 yards, 3 TD
- LAC – Justin Herbert – 23/30, 280 yards, 2 TD, INT

**Top rushers**

- KC – Isiah Pacheco – 15 rushes, 105 yards
- LAC – Austin Ekeler – 19 rushes, 83 yards, TD

**Top receivers**

- KC – Travis Kelce – 6 receptions, 115 yards, 3 TD
- LAC – Josh Palmer – 8 receptions, 106 yards, 2 TD

Allen and Williams returned for the Chargers. After the Chiefs opened the scoring with a field goal, Allen had a 17-yard catch on Los Angeles' first play from scrimmage. Two plays later, Herbert found a back-pedaling Palmer at the 5-yard line for a 50-yard touchdown. Following another Chiefs field goal, Williams converted a 3rd and 2 with a 15-yard catch, but re-injured his ankle and missed the rest of the game. Los Angeles finished that drive with a field goal, and Kansas City responded with completions of 34 and 40 yards by Mahomes before Travis Kelce's first touchdown catch. After an exchange of punts, the Chargers converted three short 3rd downs, and retook the lead when Ekeler reached the ball over the goal line. Their next drive was aided by a late hit on Herbert when Los Angeles would have faced a 4th and 2 in Chiefs territory. They drove as far as 2nd and 1 from the 2 before being driven back a yard on their next two plays. Dicker's short kick made it 20–13 at the break.

Kansas City had a 3rd and 1 on the Chargers 10 midway through the 3rd quarter, but Fox and Joe Gaziano stuffed Isiah Pacheco for the loss of a yard, and Kansas City settled for a field goal. The Chiefs faced a 3rd and 17 early on their next drive, but Mahomes converted with a 25 yards completion. He followed up with two further 3rd-down conversions, the latter being Kelce's second touchdown, which came on the first play of the final quarter. Los Angeles then crossed midfield before Allen fumbled after gaining what would have been a first down at the 32. The Chargers won the ball back six plays later when Reeder forced a fumble and Gilman recovered. Soon afterwards, a sack on Herbert left the Chargers facing 3rd and 18 at their own 38. Herbert found a diving Allen 46 yards downfield to convert; Palmer's touchdown followed four plays later with 1:46 to play. Mahomes threw incomplete on 3rd and 4 midway through the winning drive, but James was judged to have committed defensive holding, sparing the Chiefs a 4th-down conversion attempt. Kelce's scored the winning touchdown three plays later. Los Angeles still had 31 seconds and all three timeouts, but Herbert was sacked on their first play and intercepted on the second.

==== Week 12: at Arizona Cardinals ====
Week 12: Los Angeles Chargers at Arizona Cardinals – Game summary

Quarter	1	2	3	4	Total
**Chargers**	0	14	3	8	**25**
Cardinals	7	10	0	7	**24**

at State Farm Stadium, Glendale, Arizona

- Date: November 27
- Game time: 2:05 p.m. MST/1:05 p.m. PST
- Game weather: None (retractable roof closed)
- Game attendance: 63,628
- Referee: Ronald Torbert
- TV announcers (CBS): Kevin Harlan, Trent Green and Melanie Collins
- Recap, Game Book

Game information

**First quarter**

- ARI – DeAndre Hopkins 33-yard pass from Kyler Murray (Matt Prater kick), 2:33. Cardinals 7–0. **Drive: 10 plays, 82 yards, 6:32.**

**Second quarter**

- ARI – Matt Prater 43-yard field goal, 14:03. Cardinals 10–0. **Drive: 7 plays, 19 yards, 2:48.**
- LAC – Keenan Allen 2-yard pass from Justin Herbert (Cameron Dicker kick), 8:51. Cardinals 10–7. **Drive: 11 plays, 75 yards, 5:12.**
- LAC – DeAndre Carter 33-yard pass from Justin Herbert (Cameron Dicker kick), 4:28. Chargers 14–10. **Drive: 5 plays, 56 yards, 2:35.**
- ARI – Kyler Murray 5-yard run (Matt Prater kick), 0:12. Cardinals 17–14. **Drive: 14 plays, 75 yards, 4:16.**

**Third quarter**

- LAC – Cameron Dicker 26-yard field goal, 4:28. Tied 17–17. **Drive: 14 plays, 53 yards, 6:33.**

**Fourth quarter**

- ARI – James Conner 6-yard pass from Kyler Murray (Matt Prater kick), 13:31. Cardinals 24–17. **Drive: 11 plays, 75 yards, 5:57.**
- LAC – Austin Ekeler 1-yard pass from Justin Herbert (Justin Herbert–Gerald Everett pass), 0:15. Chargers 25–24. **Drive: 7 plays, 38 yards, 1:33.**

**Top passers**

- LAC – Justin Herbert – 35/47, 274 yards, 3 TD
- ARI – Kyler Murray – 18/29, 191 yards, 2 TD, INT

**Top rushers**

- LAC – Justin Herbert – 4 rushes, 38 yards
- ARI – James Conner – 25 rushes, 120 yards

**Top receivers**

- LAC – DeAndre Carter – 7 receptions, 73 yards
- ARI – DeAndre Hopkins – 4 receptions, 87 yards, TD

Los Angeles punted on their first three possessions, with Herbert sacked on 3rd down on two of them. Arizona lost a fumble the first time they had the ball (forced by James, recovered by Joseph-Day), but put up ten points on their following two. The Chargers responded with back-to-back touchdown drives. On the first of these, Palmer fumbled after an 18-yard catch to the Cardinals 38 and Arizona were initially given possession of the ball. After an official review, Bandy was credited with the recovery and Los Angeles maintained possession. The drive ended when Allen was unmarked in the left flat and scored for the first time in 2022. The Cardinals soon reached a 4th and 1 at their own 34; they went for it, and James intercepted Kyler Murray 22 yards downfield. Herbert then completed five passes in a row, with Carter left open for his 33-yard touchdown. Murray had two successful scrambles on the next drive, converting a 3rd and 6 then scoring from 5 yards out for a 17–14 halftime lead.

The teams exchanged field goal tries at the start of the second half, with Matt Prater wide left from 49 yards and Dicker successful from 26 to tie the game. Murray's second touchdown pass on the following drive put Arizona seven points ahead. After two punts each, Herbert led Los Angeles from their own 22 to a 3rd and 7 at the Cardinals 35. Herbert was then sacked for the loss of 13, and Scott punted to the Arizona 10 with 2:19 to play. Davis' 2nd-down sack helped force a three-and-out, and Los Angeles started at the Arizona 38 after Carter's 20-yard punt return. Starting with 1:48 to play, Herbert completed 5 of 6 passes for 48 yards and a touchdown on the winning drive. After Ekeler's 10-yard catch moved the ball to the 1-yard line, Los Angeles called their last timeout, then Herbert threw to Ekeler in the right flat; he was tackled immediately, but was able to reach the ball over the goal line with 15 seconds left. Everett was open over the middle for a quick throw and catch on the decisive two-point conversion, then Murray threw incomplete twice to end the game.

==== Week 13: at Las Vegas Raiders ====
Week 13: Los Angeles Chargers at Las Vegas Raiders – Game summary

Quarter	1	2	3	4	Total
Chargers	7	6	0	7	**20**
**Raiders**	0	10	14	3	**27**

at Allegiant Stadium, Paradise, Nevada

- Date: December 4
- Game time: 1:25 p.m. PST
- Game weather: None (indoor stadium)
- Game attendance: 62,123
- Referee: Craig Wrolstad
- TV announcers (CBS): Greg Gumbel, Adam Archuleta and AJ Ross
- Recap, Game Book

Game information

**First quarter**

- LAC – Bryce Callahan 26-yard interception return (Cameron Dicker kick), 5:07. Chargers 7–0.

**Second quarter**

- LAC – Cameron Dicker 37-yard field goal, 11:37. Chargers 10–0. **Drive: 13 plays, 61 yards, 6:35.**
- LV – Josh Jacobs 20-yard run (Daniel Carlson kick), 7:52. Chargers 10–7. **Drive: 8 plays, 75 yards, 3:45.**
- LV – Daniel Carlson 55-yard field goal, 2:17. Tied 10–10. **Drive: 8 play, 42 yards, 3:22.**
- LAC – Cameron Dicker 34-yard field goal, 0:27. Chargers 13–10. **Drive: 12 plays, 59 yards, 1:50.**

**Third quarter**

- LV – Davante Adams 31-yard pass from Derek Carr (Daniel Carlson kick), 14:28. Raiders 17–13. **Drive: 1 plays, 31 yards, 0:08.**
- LV – Davante Adams 45-yard pass from Derek Carr (Daniel Carlson kick), 10:53. Raiders 24–13. **Drive: 2 plays, 58 yards, 0:32.**

**Fourth quarter**

- LV – Daniel Carlson 25-yard field goal, 14:49. Raiders 27–13. **Drive: 14 play, 74 yards, 8:40.**
- LAC – Keenan Allen 35-yard pass from Justin Herbert (Cameron Dicker kick), 8:34. Raiders 27–20. **Drive: 12 play, 78 yards, 6:15.**

**Top passers**

- LAC – Justin Herbert – 28/47, 335 yards, TD
- LV – Derek Carr – 16/30, 250 yards, 2 TD, INT

**Top rushers**

- LAC – Austin Ekeler – 10 rushes, 35 yards
- LV – Josh Jacobs – 26 rushes, 144 yards, TD

**Top receivers**

- LAC – Keenan Allen – 6 receptions, 88 yards, TD
- LV – Davante Adams – 8 receptions, 177 yards, 2 TD

Midway through the opening quarter, Murray forced a fumble that Van Noy recovered at the Raiders 25. After gaining 8 yards on three plays, Los Angeles went for it on 4th and 2, but Herbert could only scramble for 1 yard. Three plays later, Samuel tipped a Carr pass, which Callahan intercepted and returned for a touchdown. The Chargers reached a 3rd and 5 at the Las Vegas 15 on their next drive before Herbert was sacked and Dicker extended their lead with a field goal. The Raiders responded with ten points on their next two drives to tie the score, before Dicker restored the lead 27 seconds before halftime. Las Vegas kicker Daniel Carlson missed from 52 yards as time expired, leaving the Chargers 13–10 ahead.

The Raiders took control of the game in the 3rd quarter. Ekeler lost a fumble on the second play of the period, and Adams scored his first touchdown on the following play. Soon afterwards, Dicker was wide right from 52 yards, and Adams scored again two plays later. After a Los Angeles punt, Las Vegas used the final eight minutes of the quarter driving 74 yards to a 3rd and 1 on the Chargers 6. Michael Davis broke up an end zone pass on the first play of the 4th quarter, and Carlson extended the lead to 27–13. Herbert converted a 4th and 1 with a quarterback sneak early on the following drive. Later, he converted a 4th and 12 by finding Allen in the end zone for 35 yards and a touchdown. The Charger defense gave up two first downs on the next drive, but eventually forced a punt; Los Angeles took over on their own 9 with five minutes to play and a chance to tie the game. Everett had catches of 18 and 16 yards, but Herbert eventually threw incomplete on 4th and 9 from the Las Vegas 42. Los Angeles had a last chance, starting from their own 10 with 22 seconds left. They could advance only as far as the Raiders 49 before time expired.

==== Week 14: vs. Miami Dolphins ====
Week 14: Miami Dolphins at Los Angeles Chargers – Game summary

Quarter	1	2	3	4	Total
Dolphins	0	7	7	3	**17**
**Chargers**	0	17	3	3	**23**

at SoFi Stadium, Inglewood, California

- Date: December 11
- Game time: 5:20 p.m. PST
- Game weather: 53 °F (12 °C) (fixed roof)
- Game attendance: 70,240
- Referee: Scott Novak
- TV announcers (NBC): Mike Tirico, Cris Collinsworth and Melissa Stark
- Recap, Game Book

Game information

**First quarter**

- No scoring plays.

**Second quarter**

- LAC – Cameron Dicker 33-yard field goal, 14:14. Chargers 3–0. **Drive: 8 plays, 42 yards, 3:22.**
- LAC – Mike Williams 10-yard pass from Justin Herbert (Cameron Dicker kick), 9:49. Chargers 10–0. **Drive: 5 plays, 43 yards, 2:52.**
- MIA – Tyreek Hill 57-yard fumble recovery (Jason Sanders kick), 8:45. Chargers 10–7. **Drive: 3 play, 75 yards, 1:04.**
- LAC – Austin Ekeler 1-yard run (Cameron Dicker kick), 0:18. Chargers 17–7. **Drive: 13 plays, 90 yards, 3:45.**

**Third quarter**

- MIA – Tyreek Hill 60-yard pass from Tua Tagovailoa (Jason Sanders kick), 6:23. Chargers 17–14. **Drive: 5 play, 76 yards, 2:42.**
- LAC – Cameron Dicker 31-yard field goal, 4:18. Chargers 20–14. **Drive: 6 plays, 62 yards, 2:05.**

**Fourth quarter**

- LAC – Cameron Dicker 28-yard field goal, 2:40. Chargers 23–14. **Drive: 17 plays, 79 yards, 8:39.**
- MIA – Jason Sanders 55-yard field goal, 1:10. Chargers 23–17. **Drive: 7 plays, 38 yards, 1:30.**

**Top passers**

- MIA – Tua Tagovailoa – 10/28, 145 yards, TD
- LAC – Justin Herbert – 39/51, 367 yards, TD

**Top rushers**

- MIA – Raheem Mostert – 11 rushes, 37 yards
- LAC – Austin Ekeler – 15 rushes, 45 yards, TD

**Top receivers**

- MIA – Tyreek Hill – 10 receptions, 81 yards, TD
- LAC – Mike Williams – 6 receptions, 116 yards, TD

On their first drive of the game Los Angeles went 78 yards in 15 plays, reaching a 4th and goal from the Miami 2 before Carter stumbled while taking Herbert's pass in the left flat and was tackled for no gain. They were back in the Miami red zone on their next possession, this time taking the lead through a Dicker field goal. The Dolphins went three-and-out, with Carter returning the punt 22 yards to the Miami 43. Kelley ran for 22 yards to convert a 3rd and 1, and Williams caught Herbert's pass in the back of the end zone two plays later. To that point, the Dolphins had gained only one first down on three possessions, but they responded to the Chargers' touchdown in unusual fashion; Gilman forced a fumble that was knocked out of a scrum of players on both sides trying to recover it. Tyreek Hill picked the loose ball up and raced away to score easily. After an exchange of punts, Los Angeles began at their own 10 yard line. Herbert converted 3rd downs with completions to Allen and Palmer, then Ekeler took a short pass for 16 yards on 3rd and goal from the 17. Ekeler followed the block of Horvath to score on 4th and goal, putting the Chargers ahead 17–7 at the break.

Midway through the 3rd quarter, Hill scored his second long touchdown after Davis tripped over in coverage. Two plays into the Chargers' response, Herbert rolled right before finding Williams for 55 yards up the left sideline, setting up another Dicker field goal. Miami crossed midfield on each of their next possessions, but were pushed back both times; Fox sacked Tua Tagovailoa on the first drive, and Tranquill pressured him into committing intentional grounding on the second one. Both drives ended in punts. After the second of these, Los Angeles took over on their own 11 yard line with eleven minutes to play, and ran off over eight minutes on a 17-play drive to a field goal. Herbert and Allen combined to convert two 3rd downs on the drive, and Herbert later ran for 10 yards on a 3rd and 8. The Chargers almost turned the ball over two plays before Dicker's field goal, but Herbert recovered his own mishandled snap. Miami, operating without timeouts, were able to pull back within six points with 70 seconds still to play. Palmer then failed to gather an onside kick, but Niemann fell on the loose ball and recovered, denying the Dolphins an opportunity for a game-winning drive.

==== Week 15: vs. Tennessee Titans ====
Week 15: Tennessee Titans at Los Angeles Chargers – Game summary

Quarter	1	2	3	4	Total
Titans	0	7	0	7	**14**
**Chargers**	7	0	0	10	**17**

at SoFi Stadium, Inglewood, California

- Date: December 18
- Game time: 1:25 p.m. PST
- Game weather: None (fixed roof)
- Game attendance: 70,240
- Referee: Land Clark
- TV announcers (CBS): Andrew Catalon, James Lofton and Amanda Renner
- Recap, Game Book

Game information

**First quarter**

- LAC – Joshua Kelley 1-yard run (Cameron Dicker kick), 4:25. Chargers 7–0. **Drive: 14 plays, 68 yards, 8:11.**

**Second quarter**

- TEN – Derrick Henry 4-yard run (Randy Bullock kick), 10:09. Tied 7–7. **Drive: 6 plays, 63 yards, 2:15.**

**Third quarter**

- No scoring plays.

**Fourth quarter**

- LAC – Austin Ekeler 3-yard run (Cameron Dicker kick), 10:28. Chargers 14–7. **Drive: 6 plays, 59 yards, 3:06.**
- TEN – Ryan Tannehill 1-yard run (Randy Bullock kick), 0:48. Tied 14–14. **Drive: 11 plays, 74 yards, 2:09.**
- LAC – Cameron Dicker 43-yard field goal, 0:04. Chargers 17–14. **Drive: 6 plays, 52 yards, 0:44.**

**Top passers**

- TEN – Ryan Tannehill – 15/22, 165 yards, INT
- LAC – Justin Herbert – 28/42, 313 yards, 2 INT

**Top rushers**

- TEN – Derrick Henry – 21 rushes, 104 yards, TD
- LAC – Austin Ekeler – 12 rushes, 58 yards, TD

**Top receivers**

- TEN – Derrick Henry – 4 receptions, 59 yards
- LAC – Keenan Allen – 8 receptions, 86 yards

After forcing a three-and-out by the Titans offense, the Chargers drove into opposition territory, where a sack left them facing a 3rd and 16 at the 34. Herbert completed passes of 14 and 4 yards to Allen to convert. Los Angeles followed up with six consecutive running plays, with Kelley twice converting on 3rd and short, the latter for a touchdown. After an exchange of punts, Titans running back Derrick Henry accounted for all 63 yards on the game-tying drive. In the final two minutes of the half, Herbert completed six consecutive passes to six different receivers, moving the Chargers from their own 20 to the Tennessee 25 with 12 seconds to play. From there, Herbert's end zone pass seemed to be going out of bounds, but one Titans defensive back knocked it back into play for another to intercept, keeping the score tied at 7–7.

Los Angeles crossed midfield on their first two possessions of the second half, but had to punt both times. Two plays after the second of these punts, Adderley intercepted a deep Ryan Tannehill pass, setting his offense up at the Titans 48. The Chargers advanced to the 27 before Herbert forced a pass into good coverage and was intercepted in return. After an exchange of punts, Tennessee gained a first down at the Los Angeles 25. Gaziano and Chris Rumph II each sacked Tannehill over the next three plays, and kicker Randy Bullock was wide right on a 51-yard attempt. Four plays later, Herbert's 31-yard pass to Allen moved the ball to the Titans 15, from where Ekeler had runs of 12 and 3 yards, the latter for a touchdown. Sacks by Van Noy and Tranquill on the next two Tennessee drives were instrumental in forcing the Titans to punt, but Los Angeles had to punt the ball back each time. Starting from his own 26 with three minutes to play, Tannehill went completed all 6 of his passes on the game-tying drive, scoring himself on 3rd and goal with a quarterback sneak. Staley used all three of his timeouts late on the Titans' drive to preserve time for a response, and Herbert had 44 seconds to work with when he began at his own 23. After completions of 16 yards to Williams and 6 yards to Everett, both of whom got out of bounds to stop the clock, Herbert rolled right and found the leaping Williams for 35 yards up the sideline. A delay of game penalty pushed the Chargers back 5 yards, but Dicker hit the game-winner from 43 yards without difficulty.

==== Week 16: at Indianapolis Colts ====
Week 16: Los Angeles Chargers at Indianapolis Colts – Game summary

Quarter	1	2	3	4	Total
**Chargers**	0	10	3	7	**20**
Colts	0	3	0	0	**3**

at Lucas Oil Stadium, Indianapolis, Indiana

- Date: December 26
- Game time: 8:15 p.m. EST/5:15 p.m. PST
- Game weather: None (retractable roof closed)
- Game attendance: 65,576
- Referee: Clay Martin
- TV announcers (KABC-TV/ESPN): Joe Buck, Troy Aikman and Lisa Salters
- Recap, Game Book

Game information

**First quarter**

- No scoring plays.

**Second quarter**

- LAC – Austin Ekeler 1-yard run (Cameron Dicker kick), 8:41. Chargers 7–0. **Drive: 13 plays, 70 yards, 7:26.**
- IND – Chase McLaughlin 46-yard field goal, 4:21. Chargers 7–3. **Drive: 8 plays, 60 yards, 4:20.**
- LAC – Cameron Dicker 24-yard field goal, 0:00. Chargers 10–3. **Drive: 13 plays, 69 yards, 4:21.**

**Third quarter**

- LAC – Cameron Dicker 21-yard field goal, 6:01. Chargers 13–3. **Drive: 8 plays, 23 yards, 4:02.**

**Fourth quarter**

- LAC – Austin Ekeler 1-yard run (Cameron Dicker kick), 8:20. Chargers 20–3. **Drive: 12 plays, 88 yards, 6:33.**

**Top passers**

- LAC – Justin Herbert – 24/31, 235 yards, INT
- IND – Nick Foles – 17/29, 143 yards, 3 INT

**Top rushers**

- LAC – Austin Ekeler – 18 rushes, 67 yards, 2 TD
- IND – Zack Moss – 12 rushes, 65 yards

**Top receivers**

- LAC – Keenan Allen – 11 receptions, 104 yards
- IND – Jelani Woods – 3 receptions, 43 yards

Aided by other results earlier in the week, Los Angeles could clinch a playoff berth with a win. Davis and James both intercepted Nick Foles in the 1st quarter, but the Chargers converted neither turnover into points; they gained no first downs on their first four possessions, and Herbert was himself intercepted once. Following back-to-back sacks by Tranquill and Murray, the Chargers drove to their first touchdown. Herbert converted a 3rd and 7 with an 8-yard pass to Palmer, a 3rd and 13 with a 16-yard pass to Williams, and a 3rd and 1 with a 2-yard quarterback sneak; Ekeler scored on the next play. James gave up two 15-yard penalties on the following drive, once for a facemask and once for leading with his helmet while impacting a defenceless player; he was disqualified for the latter offense, and Indianapolis scored their only points at the end of the drive. Allen almost had a 48-yard touchdown reception before halftime, but stepped narrowly out of bounds at the Colts 23. Los Angeles instead scored with a short Dicker field goal and led 10–3 at halftime.

Samuel intercepted Foles' first pass attempt of the second half, leading to another field goal. Indianapolis had a chance to score when Herbert was sacked and fumbled at his own 21. The Colts reached a 4th and 1 at the 12 and went for it on the first play of the final quarter, but the Los Angeles defensive line stopped Foles for no gain on a quarterback sneak. The Chargers then made the game safe. Williams had a 26-yard catch on 3rd and 5, while Ekeler converted a 3rd and 1 and finished the 88-yard drive with a 16-yard run and a 1-yard touchdown on consecutive plays.

==== Week 17: vs. Los Angeles Rams ====
Week 17: Los Angeles Rams at Los Angeles Chargers – Game summary

Quarter	1	2	3	4	Total
Rams	3	7	0	0	**10**
**Chargers**	0	17	7	7	**31**

at SoFi Stadium, Inglewood, California

- Date: January 1
- Game time: 1:25 p.m. PST
- Game weather: Cloudy, 62 °F (17 °C) (fixed roof)
- Game attendance: 70,240
- Referee: Clete Blakeman
- TV announcers (CBS): Spero Dedes and Jay Feely
- Recap, Game Book

Game information

**First quarter**

- LAR - Matt Gay 23-yard field goal, 1:09. Rams 3–0. **Drive: 13 plays, 81 yards, 8:10.**

**Second quarter**

- LAC – Austin Ekeler 10-yard run (Cameron Dicker kick), 13:40. Chargers 7–3. **Drive: 5 plays, 75 yards, 2:29.**
- LAC – Austin Ekeler 72-yard run (Cameron Dicker kick), 8:25. Chargers 14–3. **Drive: 5 plays, 90 yards, 1:55.**
- LAR – Malcolm Brown 23-yard run, 4:09. Chargers 14–10. **Drive: 7 plays, 75 yards, 4:16.**
- LAC – Cameron Dicker 40-yard field goal, 0:14. Chargers 17–10. **Drive: 13 plays, 53 yards, 3:55.**

**Third quarter**

- LAC – Gerald Everett 6-yard pass from Justin Herbert (Cameron Dicker kick), 8:46. Chargers 24–10. **Drive: 11 plays, 75 yards, 6:14.**

**Fourth quarter**

- LAC – Donald Parham 3-yard pass from Justin Herbert (Cameron Dicker kick), 12:12. Chargers 31–10. **Drive: 9 plays, 70 yards, 4:01.**

**Top passers**

- LAC – Justin Herbert – 21/28, 212 yards, 2 TD
- LAR – Baker Mayfield – 11/19, 132 yards

**Top rushers**

- LAC – Austin Ekeler – 10 rushes, 122 yards, 2 TD
- LAR – Cam Akers – 19 rushes, 123 yards

**Top receivers**

- LAC – Mike Williams – 10 receptions, 94 yards
- LAR – Van Jefferson – 3 receptions, 77 yards

The Rams drove from their own 14 to the Chargers 5 in the opening quarter; they kicked a short field goal after Davis broke up a pass on 3rd and goal. Williams had 26 and 19 yard receptions on the following drive, which ended with Ekeler's first touchdown run. After a Rams punt, Ekeler scored again; he ran through the right guard area, broke a single tackle near the line of scrimmage, then raced clear for a 72-yard touchdown. It was the longest run of his career. The Rams responded with their lone touchdown of the game, then an athletic one-handed catch by Williams set up Dicker's field goal late in the half for a 17–10 lead.

Herbert completed 5 of 5 passes for 48 yards on the opening drive of the second half, finishing the drive by finding Everett on 3rd down for a touchdown. The Rams reached a 3rd and 5 at the Chargers 35, but Van Noy knocked the ball from Baker Mayfield's hands and recovered it himself. After an exchange of punts, Herbert found Allen for 28 yards to move into Rams territory, then Parham for a touchdown on 3rd and goal. Herbert then left the game, and the Rams gained no first downs on their last three possessions as the Chargers eased to victory.

==== Week 18: at Denver Broncos ====
Week 18: Los Angeles Chargers at Denver Broncos – Game summary

Quarter	1	2	3	4	Total
Chargers	7	10	3	8	**28**
**Broncos**	7	10	7	7	**31**

at Empower Field at Mile High, Denver, Colorado

- Date: January 8
- Game time: 2:25 p.m. MST/1:25 p.m. PST
- Game weather: Partly cloudy, 51 °F (11 °C)
- Game attendance: 74,035
- Referee: Shawn Hochuli
- TV announcers (CBS): Andrew Catalon and James Lofton
- Recap, Game Book

Game information

**First quarter**

- LAC – Keenan Allen 14-yard pass from Justin Herbert (Cameron Dicker kick), 11:17. Chargers 7–0. **Drive: 8 plays, 75 yards, 3:43.**
- DEN – Latavius Murray 2-yard run (Brandon McManus kick), 3:55. Tied 7–7. **Drive: 13 plays, 75 yards, 7:22.**

**Second quarter**

- LAC – Gerald Everett 3-yard pass from Justin Herbert (Cameron Dicker kick), 10:57. Chargers 14–7. **Drive: 12 plays, 53 yards, 5:40.**
- DEN – Brandon McManus 33-yard field goal, 2:43. Chargers 14–10. **Drive: 7 plays, 34 yards, 3:29.**
- LAC – Cameron Dicker 48-yard field goal, 0:26. Chargers 17–10. **Drive: 6 plays, 33 yards, 0:42.**
- DEN – Eric Tomlinson 3-yard pass from Russell Wilson (Brandon McManus kick), 0:06. Tied 17–17. **Drive: 3 plays, 75 yards, 0:20.**

**Third quarter**

- DEN – Tyler Badie 24-yard pass from Russell Wilson (Brandon McManus kick), 11:42. Broncos 24–17. **Drive: 6 plays, 75 yards, 3:18.**
- LAC – Cameron Dicker 36-yard field goal, 6:42. Broncos 24–20. **Drive: 5 plays, 28 yards, 2:08.**

**Fourth quarter**

- DEN – Courtland Sutton 20-yard pass from Russell Wilson (Brandon McManus kick), 11:15. Broncos 31–20. **Drive: 8 plays, 89 yards, 4:06.**
- LAC – Keenan Allen 3-yard pass from Chase Daniel (Cameron Dicker–Josh Palmer pass), 6:02. Broncos 31–28. **Drive: 6 plays, 29 yards, 3:03.**

**Top passers**

- LAC – Justin Herbert – 25/37, 273 yards, 2 TD
- DEN – Russell Wilson – 13/24, 283 yards, 3 TD, INT

**Top rushers**

- LAC – Austin Ekeler – 11 rushes, 34 yards
- DEN – Latavius Murray – 15 rushes, 103 yards, TD

**Top receivers**

- LAC – Keenan Allen – 8 receptions, 102 yards, 2 TD
- DEN – Jerry Jeudy – 5 receptions, 154 yards

Due to a result earlier in the day, Los Angeles were assured of entering the playoffs as the AFC's No. 5 at kickoff. Herbert nonetheless played most of the game; he had completions of 30 and 14 yards to Allen on the opening drive, the latter for a touchdown. Denver also scored a touchdown on their first drive, then both teams punted before the Chargers converted four times on 3rd down to retake the lead through Everett's touchdown catch. Ekeler's third lost fumble of the season led to a Broncos field goal. Dicker restored Los Angeles' seven-point lead with only 26 seconds left in the half, but that was enough time for Denver to level at 17–17; Jerry Jeudy got behind Gilman and James for a 57-yard catch from Russell Wilson, who threw a touchdown on the following play.

Russell threw another touchdown on the first drive of the second half, then combined with Jeudy for another 50 yards. Two plays later, Van Noy deflected a pass and Joseph-Day intercepted it, leading to another Dicker field goal. The Chargers threatened to take the lead on their next drive, but Carter fumbled at the Denver 15 after a 25-yard catch. Wilson then had his third 50-plus yard completion of the game to set up his third touchdown pass with eleven minutes to play. Chase Daniel then replaced Herbert at quarterback. His first drive resulted in a punt, which was muffed by the Broncos and recovered by Gilman at the Denver 29; that led to Daniel's passes to Allen and Palmer for a touchdown and two-point conversion. Los Angeles had one more possession, but went three-and-out and Denver ran off the final 3:14 of the game.

Staley received criticism for playing his starters for longer than necessary in a game that did not affect playoff seeding, especially after Williams was diagnosed with a back fracture that would keep him out of the Chargers' wild card playoff game in Jacksonville; he was injured after making a catch during the Chargers' fifth offensive series in Denver. Speaking about the decision, Staley said, "It’s very difficult to decide who plays and who doesn't and who's more valuable than the rest. What you’re trying to do is set a standard for your program about how you do things."

=== Standings ===
==== Division ====
AFC West
	W	L	T	PCT	DIV	CONF	PF	PA	STK
^{(1)} Kansas City Chiefs	14	3	0	.824	6–0	9–3	496	369	W5
^{(5)} Los Angeles Chargers	10	7	0	.588	2–4	7–5	391	384	L1
Las Vegas Raiders	6	11	0	.353	3–3	5–7	395	418	L3
Denver Broncos	5	12	0	.294	1–5	3–9	287	359	W1

==== Conference ====
AFC
#	Team	Division	W	L	T	PCT	DIV	CONF	SOS	SOV	STK
**Division leaders**
1	Kansas City Chiefs	West	14	3	0	.824	6–0	9–3	.453	.422	W5
2	Buffalo Bills	East	13	3	0	.813	4–2	9–2	.489	.471	W7
3	Cincinnati Bengals	North	12	4	0	.750	3–3	8–3	.507	.490	W8
4	Jacksonville Jaguars	South	9	8	0	.529	4–2	8–4	.467	.438	W5
**Wild cards**
5 (Note: LA Chargers claimed the No. 5 seed over Baltimore based on conference record (7–5 vs. 6–6).)	Los Angeles Chargers	West	10	7	0	.588	2–4	7–5	.443	.341	L1
6	Baltimore Ravens	North	10	7	0	.588	3–3	6–6	.509	.456	L2
7 (Note: Miami finished ahead of Pittsburgh based on head-to-head victory, claiming the 7th and final playoff spot.)	Miami Dolphins	East	9	8	0	.529	3–3	7–5	.537	.457	W1
**Did not qualify for the postseason**
8	Pittsburgh Steelers	North	9	8	0	.529	3–3	5–7	.519	.451	W4
9	New England Patriots	East	8	9	0	.471	3–3	6–6	.502	.415	L1
10 (Note: NY Jets and Tennessee finished ahead of Cleveland based on conference record (5–7 vs. 4–8).) (Note: NY Jets finished ahead of Tennessee based on common record (3–3 vs. 2–4 against: Buffalo, Cincinnati, Denver, Green Bay, Jacksonville).)	New York Jets	East	7	10	0	.412	2–4	5–7	.538	.458	L6
11	Tennessee Titans	South	7	10	0	.412	3–3	5–7	.509	.336	L7
12	Cleveland Browns	North	7	10	0	.412	3–3	4–8	.524	.492	L1
13	Las Vegas Raiders	West	6	11	0	.353	3–3	5–7	.474	.397	L3
14	Denver Broncos	West	5	12	0	.294	1–5	3–9	.481	.465	W1
15	Indianapolis Colts	South	4	12	1	.265	1–4–1	4–7–1	.512	.500	L7
16	Houston Texans	South	3	13	1	.206	3–2–1	3–8–1	.481	.402	W1
**Tiebreakers** (Note: When breaking ties for three or more teams under the NFL's rules, they are first broken within divisions, then comparing only the highest ranked remaining team from each division.)

== Postseason ==
=== Schedule ===
Round	Date	Opponent (seed)	Result	Record	Venue	Recap
Wild Card	January 14	at Jacksonville Jaguars (4)	L 30–31	0–1	TIAA Bank Field	Recap

=== Game summaries ===
==== AFC Wild Card Playoffs: at (4) Jacksonville Jaguars ====
AFC Wild Card Playoffs: (5) Los Angeles Chargers at (4) Jacksonville Jaguars – Game summary

Quarter	1	2	3	4	Total
Chargers	17	10	3	0	30
Jaguars	0	7	13	11	31

at TIAA Bank Field, Jacksonville, Florida

- Date: January 14, 2023
- Game time: 8:15 p.m. EST/5:15 p.m. PST
- Game weather: 45 °F (7 °C)
- Game attendance: 70,250
- Referee: Shawn Smith
- TV announcers (NBC): Al Michaels, Tony Dungy, and Kaylee Hartung
- Recap, Game Book

Game information

First quarter

- LAC – Austin Ekeler 13-yard run (Cameron Dicker kick), 13:33. Chargers 7–0. Drive: 2 plays, 18 yards, 0:40.
- LAC – Cameron Dicker 22-yard field goal, 5:30. Chargers 10–0. Drive: 12 plays, 57 yards, 4:32.
- LAC – Austin Ekeler 6-yard run (Cameron Dicker kick), 0:44. Chargers 17–0. Drive: 3 plays, 16 yards, 1:18.

Second quarter

- LAC – Gerald Everett 9-yard pass from Justin Herbert (Cameron Dicker kick), 7:12. Chargers 24–0. Drive: 11 plays, 62 yards, 6:24.
- LAC – Cameron Dicker 23-yard field goal, 4:25. Chargers 27–0. Drive: 4 plays, 1 yard, 0:49.
- JAX – Evan Engram 9-yard pass from Trevor Lawrence (Riley Patterson kick), 0:24. Chargers 27–7. Drive: 7 plays, 47 yards, 1:25.

Third quarter

- JAX – Marvin Jones 6-yard pass from Trevor Lawrence (Riley Patterson kick), 5:11. Chargers 27–14. Drive: 14 plays, 89 yards, 7:17.
- LAC – Cameron Dicker 50-yard field goal, 2:58. Chargers 30–14. Drive: 7 plays, 45 yards, 2:13.
- JAX – Zay Jones 39-yard pass from Trevor Lawrence (pass failed), 0:44. Chargers 30–20. Drive: 5 plays, 68 yards, 2:14.

Fourth quarter

- JAX – Christian Kirk 9-yard pass from Trevor Lawrence (Trevor Lawrence run), 5:25. Chargers 30–28. Drive: 9 plays, 70 yards, 3:22.
- JAX – Riley Patterson 36-yard field goal, 0:00. Jaguars 31–30. Drive: 10 plays, 61 yards, 3:09.

Top passers

- LAC – Justin Herbert – 25/43, 273 yards, 1 TD
- JAX – Trevor Lawrence – 28/47, 288 yards, 4 TD, 4 INT

Top rushers

- LAC – Austin Ekeler – 13 rushes, 35 yards, 2 TD
- JAX – Travis Etienne – 20 rushes, 109 yards

Top receivers

- LAC – Gerald Everett – 6 receptions, 109 yards, 1 TD
- JAX – Evan Engram – 7 receptions, 93 yards, 1 TD

Jacksonville overcame five first-half turnovers and a 27–0 deficit to win on Riley Patterson's walk-off field goal. This was the third largest comeback in NFL postseason history.

On the second play of the game, Jags QB Trevor Lawrence's pass was intercepted by Drue Tranquill, who returned it 15 yards to the Jacksonville 18-yard line. This set up Austin Ekeler's 13-yard touchdown run to give the Chargers a 7–0 lead. Then on Jacksonville's next drive, Lawrence was intercepted again, this time by Asante Samuel Jr., who returned the ball 16 yards to the LA 39. From there, quarterback Justin Herbert completed 3 passes for 40 yards on a 57-yard drive to go up 10–0 on Cameron Dicker's 22-yard field goal. Following a punt from each team, Samuel recorded his second interception, returning this one for 4 yards to the Jaguars 16-yard line. Ekeler then took the ball to the end zone with three consecutive carries, the last one a 6-yard touchdown run that gave the Chargers a 17–0 lead with 37 seconds left in the first quarter.

Jacksonville was quickly forced to punt and the Chargers drove back for more points, this time going 67 yards in 13 plays, including Herbert's 23-yard completion to tight end Gerald Everett to convert a 3rd and 11. On the last play, he hit Everett again for a 9-yard score, increasing the team's lead to 24–0. Jamal Agnew gave the Jags a chance to respond by returning the kickoff 52 yards to midfield. But after two incompletions, Lawrence threw his third interception of the day and fourth overall to Samuel. Then Jacksonville turned the ball over again when Chris Claybrooks muffed a Jags punt and Amen Ogbongbemiga recovered it on the Jaguars 6-yard line. Three plays later, Dicker kicked a 23-yard field goal to give LA a 27–0 lead with 4:28 left in the half. Jacksonville had to punt on their next drive, but their defense forced a crucial three-and-out that included a stop on 3rd and 1, forcing a J. K. Scott punt that went just 34 yards before Tevaughn Campbell returned it 4 yards to the LA 47-yard line. Lawrence subsequently led the Jags 47 yards in 8 plays, including his 12-yard completion to Marvin Jones on 4th and 1, to score on his 9-yard touchdown pass to Evan Engram, making the score 27–7 going into halftime.

LA took the second half kickoff and drove to the Jacksonville 38, but were stopped there and decided to punt. Scott's kick pinned the Jaguars on their own 11-yard line, but it didn't stop them from driving 89 yards in 17 plays. Lawrence completed 8 passes for 68 yards on the drive, the last a 6-yard touchdown completion to Jones that cut their deficit to 27–14. Herbert struck back with a pair of completions to Everett for gains of 21 and 25 yards to set up Dicker's 50-yard field goal, putting the Chargers up 30–14. Agnew returned the kickoff 36 yards to the Jaguars' 32-yard line. From there, Jacksonville drove 68 yards in 7 plays to score on Lawrence's 39-yard touchdown pass to Zay Jones, making the score 30–20 after the 2-point conversion failed.

Los Angeles got the ball back with 40 seconds left in the third quarter and managed to run the clock down to under 9 minutes with a 17-play drive to the Jags 22-yard line, but came up empty when Dicker's 40-yard field goal went wide left. Jacksonville took over and drove 64 yards in 11 plays, with Lawrence completing a 21-yard pass to Engram and 3 passes to Christian Kirk for 35 yards, the last a 9-yard touchdown catch. Chargers defensive end Joey Bosa was penalized for unsportsmanlike conduct on the play, moving the ball to the 1-yard for the point after touchdown. The Jaguars took advantage of the penalty by going for two, scoring on Lawrence's 1-yard run to cut their deficit to 30–28 with 5:30 left in the game.

On the first play after the ensuing kickoff, Herbert was sacked for an 8-yard loss by Roy Robertson-Harris. He managed to complete passes on his next two plays, but they were not enough for a first down, and so the Chargers punted with 3:20 remaining. Jacksonville then put together a 10-play, 61-yard drive for the game-winning score. Three completions for 24 yards and an 8-yard run by Lawrence brought up first down at midfield. A few plays later, they faced a crucial 4th and 1 on the Chargers 41-yard line. Travis Etienne took a pitch and ran around the right side of the line for a 25-yard gain to the Chargers 16. After running the clock down to the final seconds, Patterson's 36-yard field goal gave the Jags a win as time ran out. It is the largest blown lead in Chargers history as they became the first team to lose a playoff game with a turnover margin of +5.

Lawrence completed 28 of 47 passes for 288 yards and 4 touchdowns, with 4 interceptions, and rushed once for 8 yards. Etienne was the top rusher of the day with 20 carries for 109 yards and caught a pass for 12. Engram had 7 receptions for 93 yards and a score. Agnew returned 4 kickoffs for 134 yards. Herbert finished 27/43 for 273 yards and a touchdown, while also rushing 3 times for 12 yards. Everett was his top target with 6 catches for 109 yards and a score. Samuel had 3 tackles and 3 interceptions. Ekeler, who had 1,637 yards from scrimmage and 107 receptions during the season, scored two touchdowns, but was held to just 13 carries for 35 yards and 2 receptions for 8 yards. Chargers coach Brandon Staley was later quoted as saying that "we choked", a sentiment echoed by linebacker Kyle Van Noy.

Following the game, Los Angeles fired offensive coordinator Joe Lombardi and passing game coordinator & quarterbacks coach Shane Day.

== Statistics ==
=== Team ===
Category	Total yards	Yards per game	NFL rank (out of 32)
Passing offense	4,585	269.6	3rd
Rushing offense	1,524	89.6	30th
Total offense	6,108	359.3	9th
Passing defense	3,406	200.4	7th
Rushing defense	2,478	145.8	28th
Total defense	5,884	346.1	20th

=== Individual ===
Category	Player	Total yards
Offense
Passing	Justin Herbert	4,739
Rushing	Austin Ekeler	915
Receiving	Mike Williams	895
Defense
Tackles (Solo)	Drue Tranquill	95
Sacks	Khalil Mack	8
Interceptions	Bryce Callahan	3

Statistics correct as of the end of the 2022 NFL season
