= Keelan Doss =

American football player (born 1996)

Profile
- Position: Wide receiver

Personal information
- Born: March 21, 1996 (age 30); Alameda, California, U.S.
- Listed height: 6 ft 3 in (1.91 m)
- Listed weight: 215 lb (98 kg)

Career information
- High school: Alameda
- College: UC Davis (2014–2018)
- NFL draft: 2019: undrafted

Career history
- Oakland Raiders (2019)*; Jacksonville Jaguars (2019)*; Oakland / Las Vegas Raiders (2019–2020); Atlanta Falcons (2021)*; New York Jets (2021)*; New York Giants (2022)*; Los Angeles Chargers (2022–2023); Las Vegas Raiders (2024)*
- * Offseason or practice squad member only

Career NFL statistics as of 2023
- Receptions: 17
- Receiving yards: 166
- Stats at Pro Football Reference

Keelan Doss (born March 21, 1996) is an American professional football wide receiver. He played college football at UC Davis. He set school records in touchdowns (29) and all-purpose yards (4,218). Initially projected to be taken between the third and fifth rounds, Doss went undrafted in the 2019 NFL draft.

== Professional career ==
Pre-draft measurables
Height	Weight	Arm length	Hand span	40-yard dash	10-yard split	20-yard split	Vertical jump	Broad jump	Bench press
6 ft 2 1/8 in (1.88 m)	211 lb (96 kg)	31 3/4 in (0.81 m)	9 1/2 in (0.24 m)	4.56 s	1.59 s	2.62 s	36.0 in (0.91 m)	10 ft 4 in (3.15 m)	8 reps

=== Oakland Raiders (first stint) ===
Doss signed with the Oakland Raiders on April 28, 2019, as an undrafted free agent. He was waived by Oakland on August 31.

=== Jacksonville Jaguars ===
On September 1, 2019, Doss was signed to the practice squad of the Jacksonville Jaguars.

=== Oakland (second stint) / Las Vegas Raiders (first stint) ===
On September 8, 2019, the Raiders re-signed Doss to their active roster for $495,000 in base salary and a $300,000 signing bonus following the release of Antonio Brown.

Doss re-signed with the Raiders on May 6, 2020. He was waived on September 5, and re-signed to the practice squad the next day. Doss was elevated to the active roster on October 3 for the team's Week 4 game against the Buffalo Bills, and reverted to the practice squad after the game. On January 26, 2021, Doss signed a reserves/futures contract with the Raiders.

Doss was released by Raiders on August 31, 2021.

=== Atlanta Falcons ===
On September 3, 2021, Doss was signed to the Atlanta Falcons practice squad. On October 26, Doss was released by the Falcons.

=== New York Jets ===
On November 16, 2021, Doss was signed to the New York Jets' practice squad. On December 7, Doss was released from the practice squad.

=== New York Giants ===
On June 10, 2022, Doss signed with the New York Giants. He was waived by New York on August 29.

=== Los Angeles Chargers ===
On October 5, 2022, Doss was signed to the Los Angeles Chargers' practice squad. He was promoted to the active roster a month later. He was waived on November 19 and re-signed to the practice squad. Doss signed a reserve/future contract with Los Angeles on January 17, 2023.

On August 29, 2023, Doss was waived by the Chargers and re-signed to the practice squad. He was signed to the active roster on December 30.

=== Las Vegas Raiders (second stint) ===
On July 24, 2024, Doss signed with the Las Vegas Raiders. He was waived with an injury designation on August 13.
