= Trey Pipkins =

American football player (born 1996)

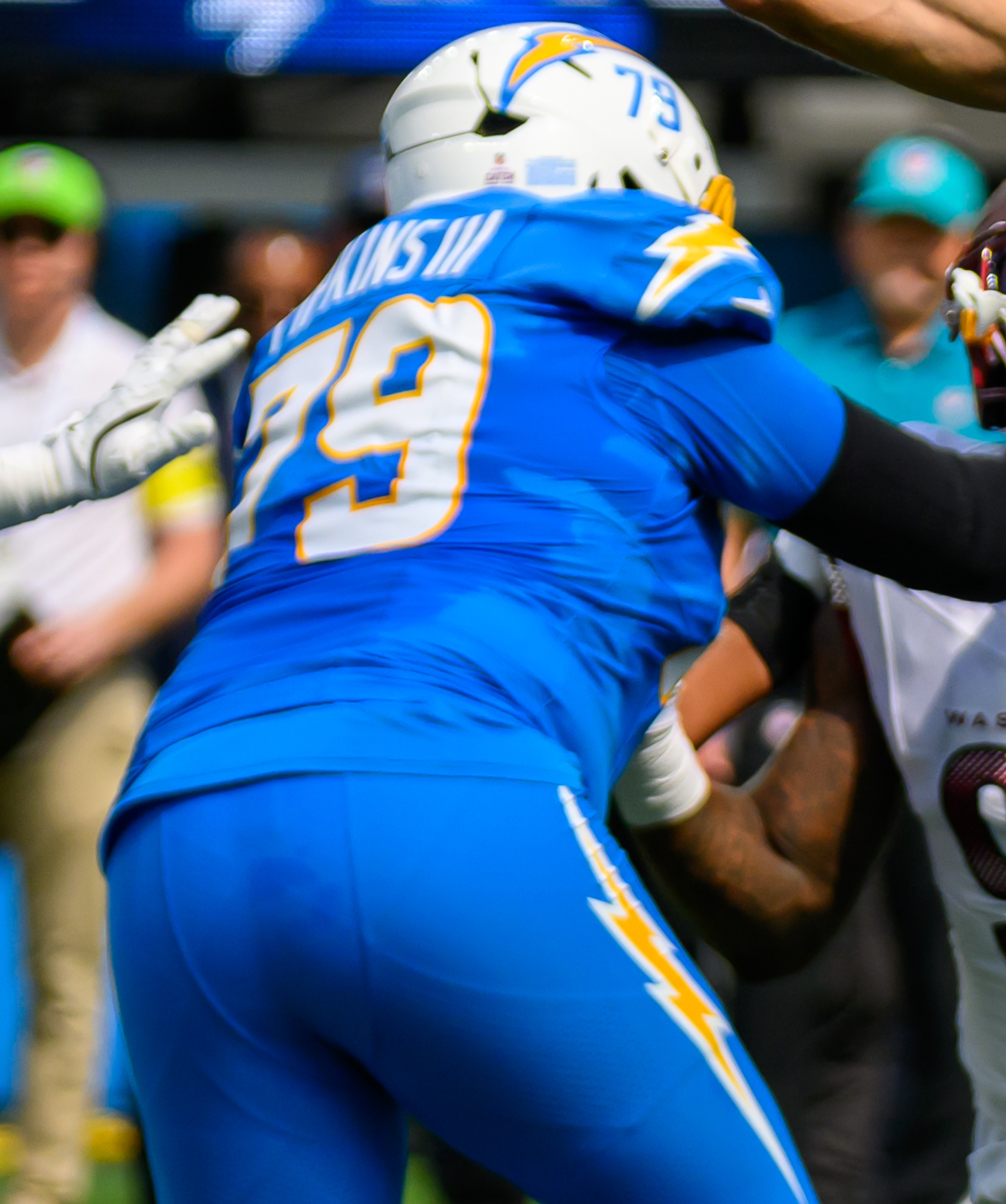
- Pipkins in 2025

No. 79 – Los Angeles Chargers
- Position: Offensive tackle
- Roster status: Active

Personal information
- Born: September 5, 1996 (age 30); Apple Valley, Minnesota, U.S.
- Listed height: 6 ft 6 in (1.98 m)
- Listed weight: 307 lb (139 kg)

Career information
- High school: Apple Valley
- College: Sioux Falls (2014–2018)
- NFL draft: 2019: 3rd round, 91st overall pick

Career history
- Los Angeles Chargers (2019–present)

Career NFL statistics as of 2025
- Games played: 97
- Games started: 66
- Stats at Pro Football Reference

James Earl "Trey" Pipkins III (born September 5, 1996) is an American professional football offensive tackle for the Los Angeles Chargers of the National Football League (NFL). He played college football for the Sioux Falls Cougars.

== Professional career ==
Pre-draft measurables
Height	Weight	Arm length	Hand span	Wingspan	40-yard dash	10-yard split	20-yard split	20-yard shuttle	Three-cone drill	Vertical jump	Broad jump	Bench press
6 ft 6 1/8 in (1.98 m)	309 lb (140 kg)	33 7/8 in (0.86 m)	9 5/8 in (0.24 m)	6 ft 9 1/2 in (2.07 m)	5.12 s	1.75 s	2.98 s	4.70 s	7.61 s	33.5 in (0.85 m)	9 ft 6 in (2.90 m)	16 reps
All values from NFL Combine

Pipkins was selected by the Los Angeles Chargers in the third round (91st overall) of the 2019 NFL draft.

Pipkins was placed on the reserve/COVID-19 list by the Chargers on October 30, 2020, and was activated the next day. He was placed back on the COVID-19 list on December 8, and activated again on December 21.

Pipkins was named the Chargers starting right tackle for the 2022 season, and started 14 games.

On March 14, 2023, Pipkins signed a three-year contract extension with the Chargers. During the Week 2 loss to the Tennessee Titans, Pipkins caught a pass for a two-point conversion after being declared an eligible receiver.

On March 11, 2026, Pipkins re-signed with the Chargers on a two-year, $10 million contract.
