= Michael Jacquet =

American football player (born 1997)

No. 39,38,34
- Position: Cornerback

Personal information
- Born: January 29, 1997 (age 29); Beaumont, Texas, U.S.
- Listed height: 6 ft 1 in (1.85 m)
- Listed weight: 201 lb (91 kg)

Career information
- High school: Central (Beaumont, TX)
- College: Louisiana
- NFL draft: 2020: undrafted

Career history
- Philadelphia Eagles (2020–2021); Jacksonville Jaguars (2021)*; New York Giants (2022)*; Los Angeles Chargers (2022)*
- * Offseason or practice squad member only

Awards and highlights
- Second-team All-Sun Belt (2019)

Career NFL statistics as of 2024
- Total tackles: 18
- Forced fumbles: 1
- Pass deflections: 3
- Stats at Pro Football Reference

Michael Jacquet III (born January 29, 1997) is an American professional football cornerback. He was signed by the Philadelphia Eagles as an undrafted free agent in 2020 following his college football career with the Louisiana Ragin' Cajuns.

== Professional career ==
=== Philadelphia Eagles ===
Jacquet signed with the Philadelphia Eagles as an undrafted free agent following the 2020 NFL draft on April 26, 2020. He was waived during final roster cuts on September 4, 2020, and was signed to the practice squad on September 29. He was elevated to the active roster on October 31 and November 14 for the team's weeks 8 and 10 games against the Dallas Cowboys and New York Giants, and reverted to the practice squad after each game. He made his NFL debut in the Cowboys game. He was signed to the active roster on November 17, 2020. In Week 15 against the Arizona Cardinals, Jacquet forced a fumble on wide receiver DeAndre Hopkins that was recovered by the Eagles and later recorded his first career sack on Kyler Murray during the 33–26 loss.

On August 31, 2021, Jacquet was waived by the Eagles and re-signed to the practice squad the next day. He was released from the practice squad on October 26.

=== Jacksonville Jaguars ===
On November 15, 2021, Jacquet was signed to the Jacksonville Jaguars practice squad.

=== New York Giants ===
On May 19, 2022, Jacquet signed with the New York Giants. On August 14, 2022, Jacquet was waived.

=== Los Angeles Chargers ===
On August 23, 2022, Jacquet signed with the Los Angeles Chargers. He was waived on August 30, 2022 He was released off the practice squad on October 6. He was re-signed to the practice squad on October 31. He signed a reserve/future contract on January 17, 2023.

On August 29, 2023, Jacquet was waived by the Chargers.
