= David Moa =

American football player (born 1996)

Profile
- Position: Defensive end

Personal information
- Born: June 14, 1996 (age 30); San Diego, California, U.S.
- Listed height: 6 ft 3 in (1.91 m)
- Listed weight: 296 lb (134 kg)

Career information
- High school: Kearny (CA)
- College: Boise State (2014–2019)
- NFL draft: 2020: undrafted

Career history
- Minnesota Vikings (2020)*; Atlanta Falcons (2020)*; New York Giants (2020–2022); Los Angeles Chargers (2022–2023); Tennessee Titans (2023)*
- * Offseason or practice squad member only

Awards and highlights
- First-team All-MWC (2016); 2× second-team All-MWC (2017, 2019)

Career NFL statistics
- Games played: 6
- Total tackles: 5
- Stats at Pro Football Reference

David Moa (born June 14, 1996) is an American professional football defensive end. He played college football at Boise State and was signed as an undrafted free agent in 2020 by the Minnesota Vikings.

== Early life and college ==
Moa was born on June 14, 1996, in San Diego, California. He attended Kearny High School and played on the offensive and defensive lines in football. He was named San Diego Section All-Western League in his junior and senior seasons. As a senior he made 28 tackles and one fumble recovery.

Moa committed to Boise State University and spent his first year (2014) as a redshirt. As a redshirt freshman in 2015, he appeared in five games, making three tackles and a sack. Moa earned a starting position as a sophomore, starting in all 13 games. He led Boise State with 8.5 sacks while also producing 30 tackles, 10.5 for loss. Moa also blocked a field goal and broke up four passes. He was named first-team All-Mountain West Conference following the year. As a junior, he appeared in 13 games, 11 as a starter, and made 21 tackles and 2 sacks. He was named second-team All-Mountain West after the year.

In 2018, Moa appeared in just one game, making two tackles, before suffering a season-ending injury. Due to this, he was given a sixth year of eligibility in 2019. He was a starter in all 14 games as a sixth-year player, making 37 tackles and earning second-team All-Mountain West honors.

== Professional career ==
Pre-draft measurables
Height	Weight	Arm length	Hand span
6 ft 3 1/8 in (1.91 m)	293 lb (133 kg)	32 7/8 in (0.84 m)	9 1/2 in (0.24 m)
All values from Pro Day

=== Minnesota Vikings ===
After going unselected in the 2020 NFL draft, Moa was signed by the Minnesota Vikings as an undrafted free agent. He was waived at the final roster cuts on September 5.

=== Atlanta Falcons ===
On September 16, Moa was signed by the Atlanta Falcons to the practice squad. He was released from the practice squad on September 22.

=== New York Giants ===
On October 5, Moa was signed to the practice squad of the New York Giants. He was signed to a futures contract in January 2021. He was waived at the final roster cuts on August 31, 2021, but re-signed to the practice squad the next day. Moa was activated for their game against the Carolina Panthers, and made his NFL debut in the 25–3 win. He also appeared in their week 15 loss against the Dallas Cowboys, week 16 loss against the Philadelphia Eagles, and week 17 loss versus the Chicago Bears. Moa finished the season with four games played, one as a starter, and three total tackles.

On August 30, 2022, Moa was waived by the Giants.

=== Los Angeles Chargers ===
On November 16, 2022, Moa was signed to the Los Angeles Chargers practice squad. He signed a reserve/future contract on January 17, 2023. He was waived on August 29, 2023.

=== Tennessee Titans ===
On December 26, 2023, Moa was signed to the Tennessee Titans practice squad. He was not signed to a reserve/future contract and thus became a free agent when his contract expired at the end of the season.
