= Jason Moore (wide receiver) =

American football player (born 1995)

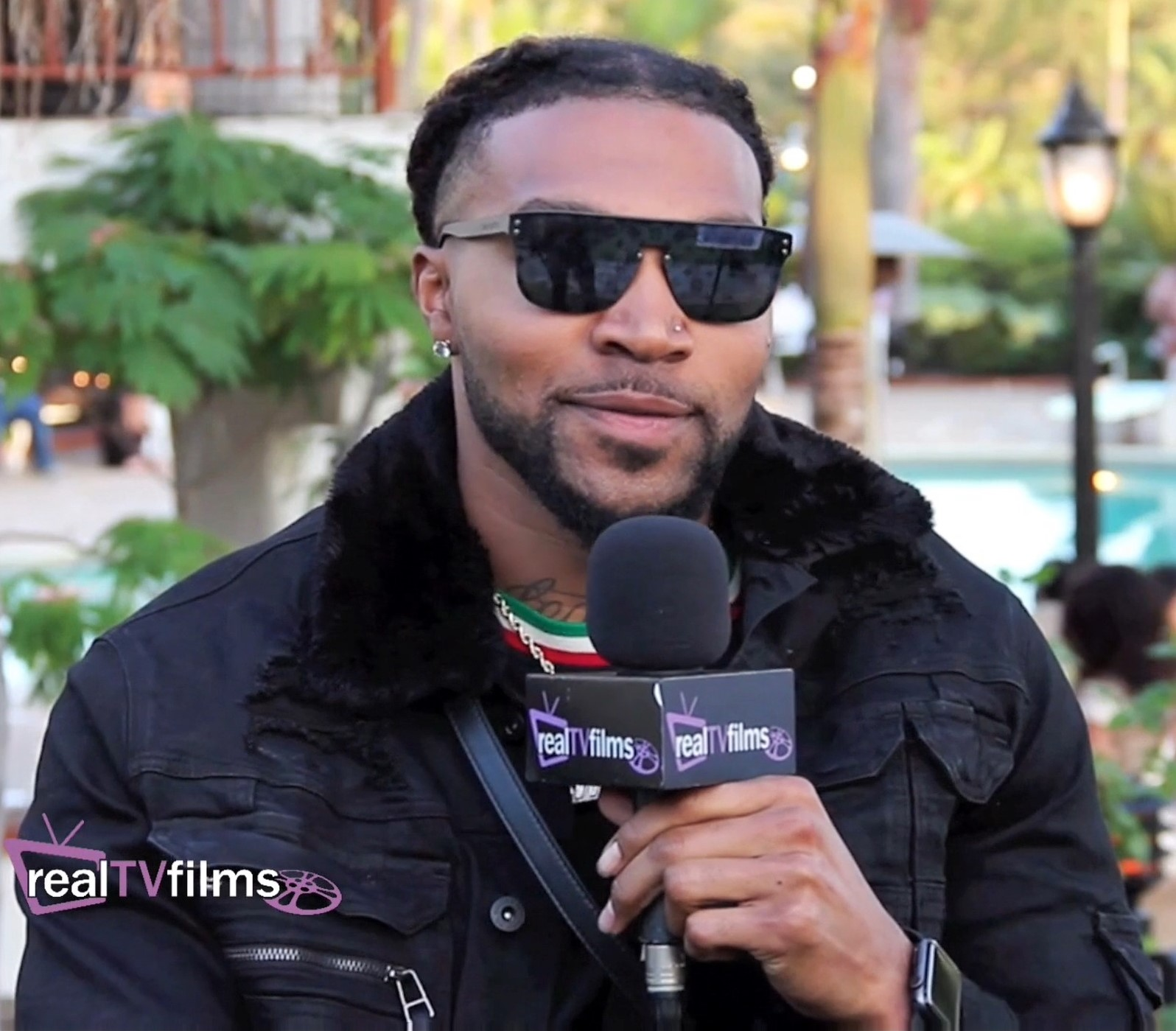
- Moore in 2022

Profile
- Position: Wide receiver

Personal information
- Born: June 23, 1995 (age 31); Oberlin, Ohio, U.S.
- Listed height: 6 ft 3 in (1.91 m)
- Listed weight: 215 lb (98 kg)

Career information
- High school: Oberlin (Oberlin)
- College: Findlay
- NFL draft: 2019: undrafted

Career history
- Los Angeles Chargers (2019–2022); Detroit Lions (2023)*
- * Offseason or practice squad member only

Awards and highlights
- First-team All-GMAC (2017); First-team All-GLIAC (2016)

Career NFL statistics
- Receptions: 6
- Receiving yards: 104
- Stats at Pro Football Reference

Jason Marquis Rydell Moore Jr. (born June 23, 1995) is an American professional football wide receiver. He played college football at Findlay.

== Early life ==
Moore was born and grew up in Oberlin, Ohio and attended Oberlin High School. Moore was named the Patriot Athletic Conference (PAC) Defensive Back of the Year as a senior. Moore was also an All-PAC selection in basketball and played in the Ohio North-South All-Star Game during his senior year.

== College career ==
Moore was a member of the Findlay Oilers football team for six seasons, redshirting his true freshman season and then using a medical redshirt the next year after breaking his leg shortly before the beginning of the season. As a sophomore, Moore set a school record with 1,115 receiving yards on 71 receptions with 15 touchdowns and was named first-team All-Great Lakes Intercollegiate Athletic Conference (GLIAC). He was named first-team All-Great Midwest Athletic Conference after catching 65 passes for 980 yards and 14 touchdowns in his junior season. Moore missed most of his senior year due to a suspension, playing only four games with 30 receptions for 495 yards and three touchdowns. His finished his collegiate career with 204 receptions for 3,217 yards and 39 touchdowns in 37 games played.

== Professional career ==
Pre-draft measurables
Height	Weight	Arm length	Hand span	40-yard dash	10-yard split	20-yard split	20-yard shuttle	Three-cone drill	Vertical jump	Broad jump	Bench press
6 ft 2 1/2 in (1.89 m)	215 lb (98 kg)	32 3/8 in (0.82 m)	9 7/8 in (0.25 m)	4.57 s	1.59 s	2.62 s	4.07 s	6.62 s	37.0 in (0.94 m)	10 ft 4 in (3.15 m)	17 reps
All values from Pro Day

=== Los Angeles Chargers ===
Moore signed with the Los Angeles Chargers as an undrafted free agent on April 27, 2019. Moore was waived at the end of training camp, but re-signed to the team's practice squad the following day on September 1, 2019. The Chargers promoted Moore to the active roster on October 12, 2019, and he made his NFL debut the following day against the Pittsburgh Steelers, catching two passes for 43 yards.

Moore was waived by the Chargers on October 24, 2020, and re-signed to the practice squad four days later. He was elevated to the active roster on October 31 for the team's week 8 game against the Denver Broncos, and reverted to the practice squad after the game. He signed a reserve/future contract with the Chargers on January 5, 2021.

On August 31, 2021, Moore was waived by the Chargers and re-signed to the practice squad the next day. He was elevated to the main roster for their week 16 game against the Houston Texans after receivers Mike Williams, Jalen Guyton and Andre Roberts were all placed on the COVID-19 reserve list. He signed a reserve/future contract with the Chargers on January 11, 2022.

On August 30, 2022, Moore was waived by the Chargers and signed to the practice squad the next day. He was promoted to the active roster on September 28. He was waived on December 17 and re-signed to the practice squad.

=== Detroit Lions ===
On August 18, 2023, Moore signed with the Detroit Lions. On August 27, 2023, Moore was released.
