= Hunter Kampmoyer =

American football player (born 1998)

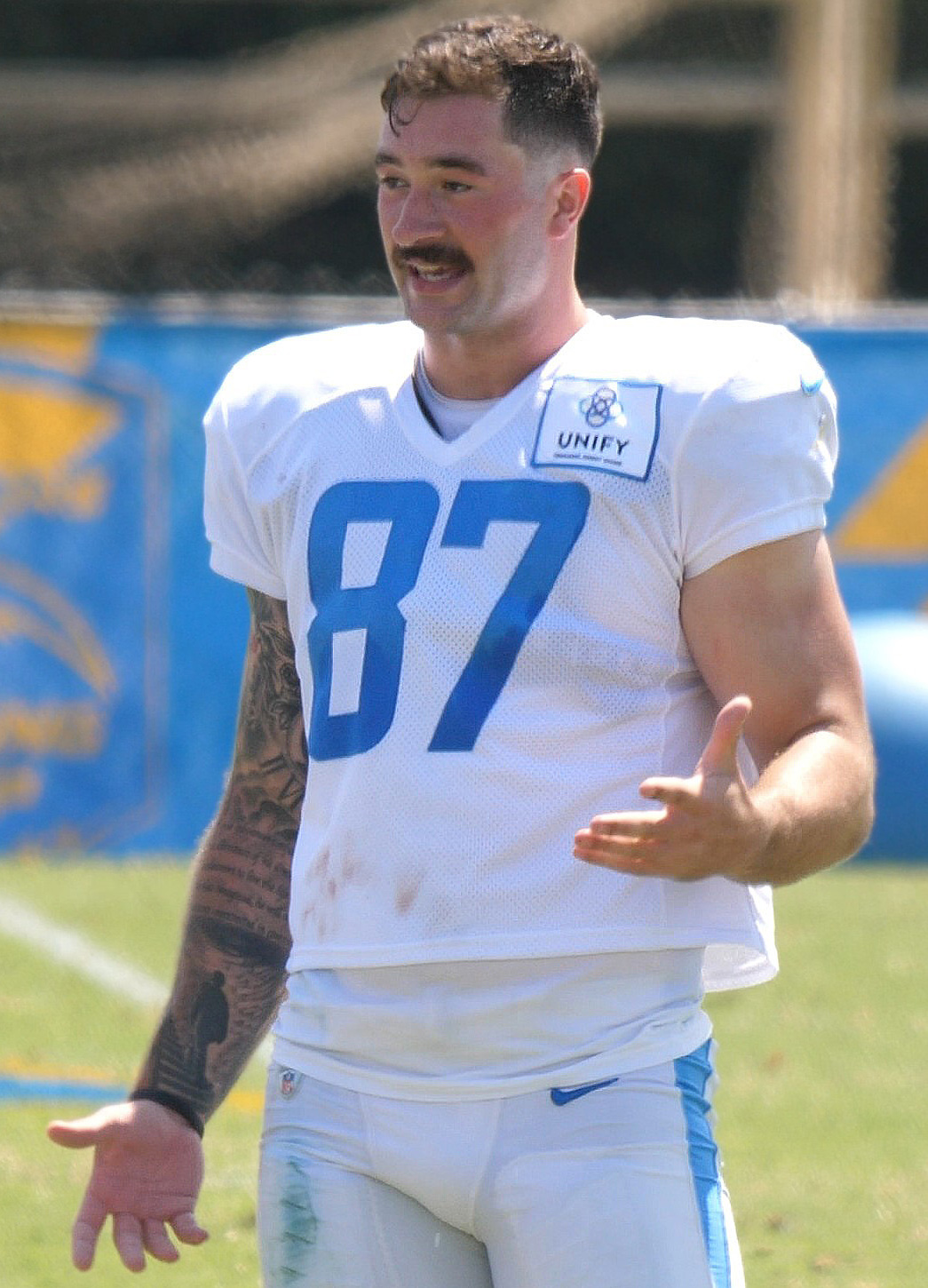
- Kampmoyer with the Los Angeles Chargers in 2022

Profile
- Position: Tight end

Personal information
- Born: February 6, 1998 (age 28); Bishop, California, U.S.
- Listed height: 6 ft 4 in (1.93 m)
- Listed weight: 243 lb (110 kg)

Career information
- High school: Bishop Union (Bishop, California)
- College: Oregon (2016–2020)
- NFL draft: 2021: undrafted

Career history
- Los Angeles Chargers (2021–2023); Denver Broncos (2024)*
- * Offseason or practice squad member only
- Stats at Pro Football Reference

Hunter Kampmoyer (born February 6, 1998) is an American professional football tight end. He played college football at Oregon.

== College career ==
Kampmoyer was a member of the Oregon Ducks for five seasons, redshirting his true freshman season. He finished his collegiate career with 20 receptions for 224 yards and four touchdowns in 45 games played.

== Professional career ==
Pre-draft measurables
Height	Weight	Arm length	Hand span	40-yard dash	10-yard split	20-yard split	20-yard shuttle	Three-cone drill	Vertical jump	Broad jump	Bench press
6 ft 4 3/8 in (1.94 m)	243 lb (110 kg)	31 3/8 in (0.80 m)	9 1/8 in (0.23 m)	4.83 s	1.71 s	2.84 s	4.56 s	7.28 s	31.0 in (0.79 m)	9 ft 5 in (2.87 m)	21 reps
All values from Pro Day

=== Los Angeles Chargers ===
Kampmoyer was signed by the Los Angeles Chargers as an undrafted free agent on May 1, 2021. He was waived during final roster cuts on August 31, 2021, but was signed to the team's practice squad the next day. Kampmoyer was elevated to the active roster on January 2, 2022, for the team's Week 17 game against the Denver Broncos and made his NFL debut in the game. He signed a reserve/future contract with the Chargers on January 11.

On August 30, 2022, Kampmoyer was waived by the Chargers and signed to the practice squad the next day. He signed a reserve/future contract with Los Angeles on January 17, 2023.

On August 29, 2023, Kampmoyer was waived by the Chargers and re-signed to the practice squad. His contract expired at the end of the season and he did not sign a reserve/future contract, thus becoming a free agent.

=== Denver Broncos ===
On August 2, 2024, Kampmoyer signed with the Denver Broncos. On August 27, the Broncos waived him.
