= 2020 Los Angeles Chargers season =

61st season in franchise history

- Owner: Dean Spanos
- General manager: Tom Telesco
- Head coach: Anthony Lynn
- Home stadium: SoFi Stadium

Results
- Record: 7–9
- Division place: 3rd AFC West
- Playoffs: Did not qualify
- All-Pros: None
- Pro Bowlers: 2: WR Keenan Allen; DE Joey Bosa

Uniform
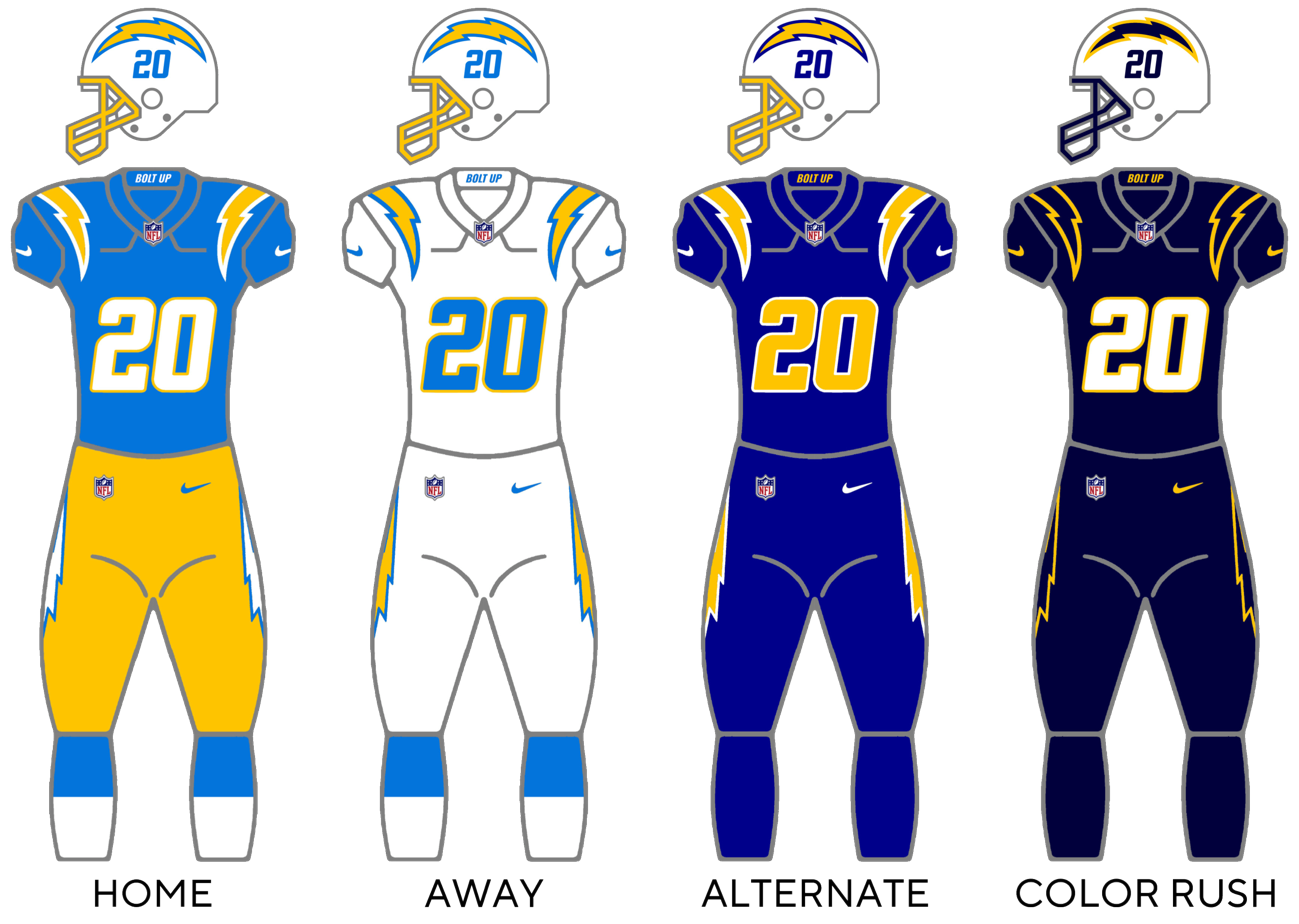

The 2020 season was the Los Angeles Chargers' 51st in the National Football League (NFL), their 61st overall, their fifth in the Greater Los Angeles Area, and their fourth and final season under head coach Anthony Lynn. It also marks the Chargers' first season playing their home games at SoFi Stadium in Inglewood (which the team shares with the Los Angeles Rams), after using Dignity Health Sports Park in Carson as their temporary home stadium for the previous three seasons. This is also the Chargers' first season since 2007 with new uniforms, which were unveiled on April 21, 2020. The uniforms are somewhat similar in design to the ones they donned during their inaugural season in 1960.

After mutually agreeing to part ways, this was the first season since 2003 without quarterback Philip Rivers on the roster and the first since 2005 without Rivers as the starting quarterback. Rivers led the Chargers to six playoff appearances, starting every game since September 11, 2006. Backup quarterback Tyrod Taylor was named starter, but following a medical mishap prior to week 2, he was replaced by rookie Justin Herbert. After a 45–0 loss to the New England Patriots in Week 13, the Chargers were mathematically eliminated from playoff contention for the second consecutive year. However, despite this, the Chargers rallied and won their last four games, bringing their record to 7–9, improving on their 5–11 season from the previous year.

At the conclusion of the 2020 season, the organization announced that Lynn was fired as head coach. This season was highlighted by a string of blown 4th quarter leads. 8 of their 9 losses were by a deficit of 10 points or less. Despite the disappointing season, quarterback Justin Herbert was named AP Offensive Rookie of the Year.

== Offseason ==
=== Signings ===
Position	Player	Age	2019 team	Contract
G	Trai Turner	26	Carolina Panthers	
CB	Chris Harris Jr.	30	Denver Broncos	
T	Bryan Bulaga	31	Green Bay Packers	
TE	Donald Parham	22	Dallas Renegades	
LB	Nick Vigil	26	Cincinnati Bengals	
T	Storm Norton	25	Los Angeles Wildcats	
DT	Linval Joseph	31	Minnesota Vikings	
WR/RS	Darius Jennings	27	Tennessee Titans	
RB	Derrick Gore	25	Los Angeles Chargers	

=== Departures ===
Position	Player	Age	2020 team
QB	Philip Rivers	38	Indianapolis Colts
RB	Melvin Gordon	27	Denver Broncos
LB	Nick Dzubnar	28	Tennessee Titans
OT	Russell Okung	31	Carolina Panthers
FB	Derek Watt	27	Pittsburgh Steelers
S	Adrian Phillips	28	New England Patriots
WR	Travis Benjamin	30	San Francisco 49ers
LB	Jatavis Brown	26	Philadelphia Eagles
G	Michael Schofield	29	Carolina Panthers

== NFL draft ==
2020 Los Angeles Chargers draft
Round	Selection	Player	Position	College
1	6	Justin Herbert	QB	Oregon
1	23	Kenneth Murray	LB	Oklahoma
4	112	Joshua Kelley	RB	UCLA
5	151	Joe Reed	WR	Virginia
6	186	Alohi Gilman	S	Notre Dame
7	220	K. J. Hill	WR	Ohio State

=== Undrafted free agents ===
Despite signing a plethora of UDFAs (undrafted free agents), all were released during the initial roster cuts.

2020 Los Angeles Chargers Undrafted Free Agents
Player	Position	College	Notes
Asmar Bilal	LB	Notre Dame	
Darius Bradwell	RB	Tulane	
John Brannon	CB	Western Carolina	
Cole Christiansen	LB	Army	
Jeff Cotton	WR	Idaho	
Joshua Dunlop	G	UTSA	
Breiden Fehoko	NT	LSU	
Romeo Finley	LB	Miami	
Joe Gaziano	DE	Northwestern	
Nate Gilliam	G	Wake Forest	
Bobby Holly	FB	Louisiana Tech	
Jesse Lemonier	DE	Liberty	
Kevin McGill	CB	Eastern Michigan	
Gabe Nabers	FB	Florida State	
Jared Rice	TE	Fresno State	
Ryan Roberts	T	Florida State	
Dalton Schoen	WR	Kansas State	
T.J. Smith	DT	Arkansas	
Donte Vaughn	CB	Notre Dame	

== Staff ==
2020 Los Angeles Chargers staff
Front office: Chairman/owner/president – Dean Spanos; Vice chairman – Michael Spanos; Executive vice president/coo/cfo – Jeanne M. Bonk; CEO/president – business operations – A. G. Spanos; General manager – Tom Telesco; President – football operations – John Spanos; Executive vice president of football administration/player finance – Ed McGuire; Director of pro scouting – Dennis Abraham; Senior director of pro personnel – Louis Clark; Director of player personnel – JoJo Wooden; Director of college scouting – Kevin Kelly; Head coaches: Head coach – Anthony Lynn; Assistant head coach/offensive analyst – George Stewart; Offensive coaches: Offensive coordinator – Shane Steichen; Quarterbacks – Pep Hamilton; Running backs – Mark Ridgley; Wide receivers – Phil McGeoghan; Tight ends – Alfredo Roberts; Assistant tight ends – Dan Shamash; Offensive line – James Campen; Assistant offensive line – David Diaz-Infante; Quality control-offense – Seth Ryan	Defensive coaches: Defensive coordinator – Gus Bradley; Defensive line – Giff Smith; Assistant defensive line – La'Roi Glover; Linebackers – Richard Smith; Defensive backs – Ron Milus; Assistant defensive backs – Addison Lynch; Quality control-defense – Ryan Milus; Special teams coaches: Special teams coordinator – Keith Burns; Senior coaching assistant – Chris Caminiti; Senior coaching assistant – Rip Scherer; Strength and conditioning: Head strength and conditioning – John Lott; Assistant strength – Jonathan Brooks; Assistant strength – Tyker Judkins

== Final roster ==
2020 Los Angeles Chargers roster
Quarterbacks (QB): 10 Justin Herbert; 2 Easton Stick; 5 Tyrod Taylor; Running backs (RB): 31 Kalen Ballage; 30 Austin Ekeler; 22 Justin Jackson; 27 Joshua Kelley; 40 Gabe Nabers FB; Wide receivers (WR): 15 Jalen Guyton; 84 K. J. Hill; 83 Tyron Johnson; 12 Joe Reed; 81 Mike Williams; Tight ends (TE): 82 Stephen Anderson; 89 Donald Parham; 48 Matt Sokol	Offensive linemen (OL): 75 Bryan Bulaga T; 66 Dan Feeney G; 76 Forrest Lamp G; 74 Storm Norton T; 79 Trey Pipkins T; 61 Scott Quessenberry G; 73 Tyree St. Louis T; 69 Sam Tevi T; 64 Cole Toner C; 70 Trai Turner G; Defensive linemen (DL): 97 Joey Bosa DE; 91 Cortez Broughton DT; 92 Joe Gaziano DE; 93 Justin Jones DT; 95 Linval Joseph DT; 90 Jessie Lemonier DE; 98 Isaac Rochell DE; 71 Damion Square DT; 99 Jerry Tillery DT	Linebackers (LB): 58 B. J. Bello MLB; 50 Cole Christiansen MLB; 51 Emeke Egbule OLB; 56 Kenneth Murray OLB; 52 Denzel Perryman MLB; 59 Nick Vigil OLB; Defensive backs (DB): 36 Jahleel Addae S; 24 Nasir Adderley SS; 37 Tevaughn Campbell CB; 43 Michael Davis CB; 28 Brandon Facyson CB; 32 Alohi Gilman S; 25 Chris Harris Jr. CB; 23 Rayshawn Jenkins FS; 20 Jaylen Watkins SS; Special teams (ST): 4 Michael Badgley K; 1 Ty Long P; 45 Cole Mazza LS	Practice squad: 34 Darius Bradwell RB; 38 John Brannon CB; 80 Jeff Cotton WR (PS/I); 4 Lac Edwards P; 96 Breiden Fehoko DT; 63 Nate Gilliam G; 67 Ryan Hunter G; 87 John Hurst WR; 11 Jason Moore WR; 35 Troymaine Pope RB; 77 T. J. Smith DT; 39 Donte Vaughn CB (Protected); 20 Jaylen Watkins SS; Reserve: 13 Keenan Allen WR (COVID-19); 88 Virgil Green TE (IR); 72 Ryan Groy C (IR); 26 Casey Hayward CB (IR); 86 Hunter Henry TE (COVID-19); 54 Melvin Ingram DE (IR); 33 Derwin James SS (IR); 46 Malik Jefferson OLB (IR); 42 Uchenna Nwosu DE (IR); 53 Mike Pouncey C (IR); 49 Drue Tranquill MLB (IR); 44 Kyzir White OLB (IR); Rookies in italics 53 active, 12 reserve, 11 practice squad (1 exempt)

== Preseason ==
The Chargers' preseason schedule was announced on May 7, but was later cancelled due to the COVID-19 pandemic.

Week	Date	Opponent	Venue	Result
1	August 16	Dallas Cowboys	SoFi Stadium	Cancelled due to the COVID-19 pandemic
2	August 22	Los Angeles Rams	SoFi Stadium	Cancelled due to the COVID-19 pandemic
3	August 27	at Seattle Seahawks	CenturyLink Field	Cancelled due to the COVID-19 pandemic
4	September 3	at San Francisco 49ers	Levi's Stadium	Cancelled due to the COVID-19 pandemic

== Regular season ==
=== Schedule ===
The Chargers' 2020 schedule was announced on May 7.

Week	Date	Opponent	Result	Record	Venue	Recap
1	September 13	at Cincinnati Bengals	**W** 16–13	1–0	Paul Brown Stadium	Recap
2	September 20	**Kansas City Chiefs**	**L** 20–23 (OT)	1–1	SoFi Stadium	Recap
3	September 27	Carolina Panthers	**L** 16–21	1–2	SoFi Stadium	Recap
4	October 4	at Tampa Bay Buccaneers	**L** 31–38	1–3	Raymond James Stadium	Recap
5	October 12	at New Orleans Saints	**L** 27–30 (OT)	1–4	Mercedes-Benz Superdome	Recap
6	Bye (Note: The following four games were moved to accommodate the postponement of the Week 5 game Denver-New England game due to several New England players testing positive for COVID-19: Week 6 vs. New York Jets moved to Week 11, Week 7 at Miami moved to Week 10, Week 8 vs Jacksonville moved to Week 7, and Week 11 at Denver moved to Week 8. The Chargers' bye week moved from Week 10 to Week 6.)					
7	October 25	Jacksonville Jaguars	**W** 39–29	2–4	SoFi Stadium	Recap
8	November 1	at **Denver Broncos**	**L** 30–31	2–5	Empower Field at Mile High	Recap
9	November 8	**Las Vegas Raiders**	**L** 26–31	2–6	SoFi Stadium	Recap
10	November 15	at Miami Dolphins	**L** 21–29	2–7	Hard Rock Stadium	Recap
11	November 22	New York Jets	**W** 34–28	3–7	SoFi Stadium	Recap
12	November 29	at Buffalo Bills	**L** 17–27	3–8	Bills Stadium	Recap
13	December 6	New England Patriots	**L** 0–45	3–9	SoFi Stadium	Recap
14	December 13	Atlanta Falcons	**W** 20–17	4–9	SoFi Stadium	Recap
15	December 17	at **Las Vegas Raiders**	**W** 30–27 (OT)	5–9	Allegiant Stadium	Recap
16	December 27	**Denver Broncos**	**W** 19–16	6–9	SoFi Stadium	Recap
17	January 3	at **Kansas City Chiefs**	**W** 38–21	7–9	Arrowhead Stadium	Recap

Note: Intra-division opponents are in bold text.

=== Game summaries ===
==== Week 1: at Cincinnati Bengals ====
Week One: Los Angeles Chargers at Cincinnati Bengals – Game summary

Quarter	1	2	3	4	Total
**Chargers**	0	6	0	10	**16**
Bengals	7	0	6	0	**13**

at Paul Brown Stadium, Cincinnati, Ohio

- Date: September 13
- Game time: 4:05 p.m. EDT/1:05 p.m. PDT
- Game weather: Partly cloudy, 83 °F (28 °C)
- Game attendance: 0
- Referee: Clay Martin
- TV announcers (CBS): Kevin Harlan, Trent Green and Melanie Collins
- Recap, Game Book

Game information

**First quarter**

- CIN – Joe Burrow 23-yard run (Randy Bullock kick), 2:24. Bengals 7–0. **Drive: 5 plays, 44 yards, 1:35.**

**Second quarter**

- LAC – Michael Badgley 24-yard field goal, 7:10. Bengals 7–3. **Drive: 11 plays, 74 yards, 4:08.**
- LAC – Michael Badgley 43-yard field goal, 0:00. Bengals 7–6. **Drive: 6 plays, 61 yards, 0:33.**

**Third quarter**

- CIN – Randy Bullock 50-yard field goal, 9:12. Bengals 10–6. **Drive: 7 plays, 29 yards, 2:28.**
- CIN – Randy Bullock 43-yard field goal, 1:32. Bengals 13–6. **Drive: 11 plays, 43 yards, 6:08.**

**Fourth quarter**

- LAC – Joshua Kelley 5-yard run (Michael Badgley kick), 12:23. Tied 13–13. **Drive: 10 plays, 55 yards, 4:09.**
- LAC – Michael Badgley 22-yard field goal, 8:56. Chargers 16–13. **Drive: 8 plays, 21 yards, 3:18.**

**Top passers**

- LAC – Tyrod Taylor – 16/30, 208 yards
- CIN – Joe Burrow – 23/36, 193 yards, INT

**Top rushers**

- LAC – Austin Ekeler – 19 rushes, 84 yards
- CIN – Joe Mixon – 19 rushes, 69 yards

**Top passers**

- LAC – Hunter Henry – 5 receptions, 73 yards
- CIN – A. J. Green – 5 receptions, 51 yards

==== Week 2: vs. Kansas City Chiefs ====
Week Two: Kansas City Chiefs at Los Angeles Chargers – Game summary

Quarter	1	2	3	4	OT	Total
**Chiefs**	0	6	3	11	3	**23**
Chargers	7	7	3	3	0	**20**

at SoFi Stadium, Inglewood, California

- Date: September 20
- Game time: 1:25 p.m. PDT
- Game weather: Sunny, 75 °F (24 °C)
- Game attendance: 0
- Referee: Carl Cheffers
- TV announcers (CBS): Jim Nantz, Tony Romo and Tracy Wolfson
- Recap, Game Book

Game information

**First quarter**

- LAC – Justin Herbert 4-yard run (Michael Badgley kick), 11:23. Chargers 7–0. **Drive: 8 plays, 79 yards, 3:37.**

**Second quarter**

- KC – Travis Kelce 10-yard pass from Patrick Mahomes (kick blocked), 8:51. Chargers 7–6. **Drive: 10 plays, 73 yards, 4:36.**
- LAC – Jalen Guyton 14-yard pass from Justin Herbert (Michael Badgley kick), 2:30. Chargers 14–6. **Drive: 11 plays, 71 yards, 6:21.**

**Third quarter**

- LAC – Michael Badgley 41-yard field goal, 8:07. Chargers 17–6. **Drive: 12 plays, 57 yards, 4:50.**
- KC – Harrison Butker 58-yard field goal, 3:11. Chargers 17–9. **Drive: 9 plays, 35 yards, 4:56.**

**Fourth quarter**

- KC – Tyreek Hill 54-yard pass from Patrick Mahomes (Patrick Mahomes-Mecole Hardman pass), 12:48. Tied 17–17. **Drive: 6 plays, 95 yards, 2:31.**
- LAC – Michael Badgley 23-yard field goal, 2:27. Chargers 20–17. **Drive: 17 plays, 82 yards, 10:21.**
- KC – Harrison Butker 30-yard field goal, 0:00. Tied 20–20. **Drive: 12 plays, 63 yards, 2:27.**

**Overtime**

- KC – Harrison Butker 58-yard field goal, 1:55. Chiefs 23–20. **Drive: 13 plays, 39 yards, 5:52.**

**Top passers**

- KC – Patrick Mahomes – 27/47, 302 yards, 2 TD
- LAC – Justin Herbert – 22/33, 311 yards, TD, INT

**Top rushers**

- KC – Patrick Mahomes – 6 rushes, 54 yards
- LAC – Austin Ekeler – 16 rushes, 93 yards

**Top receivers**

- KC – Tyreek Hill – 5 receptions, 99 yards, TD
- LAC – Keenan Allen – 7 receptions, 96 yards

Justin Herbert made an unexpected start after Taylor suffered an injury before the game.

==== Week 3: vs. Carolina Panthers ====
Week Three: Carolina Panthers at Los Angeles Chargers – Game summary

Quarter	1	2	3	4	Total
**Panthers**	6	12	0	3	**21**
Chargers	0	7	3	6	**16**

at SoFi Stadium, Inglewood, California

- Date: September 27
- Game time: 1:05 p.m. PDT
- Game weather: Hazy, 77 °F (25 °C)
- Game attendance: 0
- Referee: Tony Corrente
- TV announcers (CBS): Greg Gumbel, Rich Gannon and Jay Feely
- Recap, Game Book

Game information

**First quarter**

- CAR – Joey Slye 29-yard field goal, 9:20. Panthers 3–0. **Drive: 6 plays, 37 yards, 3:07.**
- CAR – Joey Slye 24-yard field goal, 4:28. Panthers 6–0. **Drive: 7 plays, 29 yards, 3:15.**

**Second quarter**

- LAC – Austin Ekeler 12-yard run (Michael Badgley kick), 14:14. Chargers 7–6. **Drive: 10 plays, 75 yards, 5:14.**
- CAR – Joey Slye 30-yard field goal, 8:11. Panthers 9–7. **Drive: 10 plays, 59 yards, 6:03.**
- CAR – Mike Davis 13-yard pass from Teddy Bridgewater (kick blocked), 8:11. Panthers 15–7. **Drive: 8 plays, 57 yards, 3:57.**
- CAR – Joey Slye 22-yard field goal, 0:00. Panthers 18–7. **Drive: 2 plays, 4 yards, 0:08.**

**Third quarter**

- CAR – Michael Badgley 41-yard field goal, 1:12. Panthers 18–10. **Drive: 10 plays, 37 yards, 4:34.**

**Fourth quarter**

- CAR – Joey Slye 31-yard field goal, 10:58. Panthers 21–10. **Drive: 8 plays, 62 yards, 5:14.**
- LAC – Keenan Allen 14-yard pass from Justin Herbert (pass failed), 4:33. Panthers 21–16. **Drive: 16 plays, 75 yards, 6:25.**

**Top scorers**

- CAR – Teddy Bridgewater – 22/28, 235 yards, TD
- LAC – Justin Herbert – 35/49, 330 yards, TD, INT

**Top passers**

- CAR – Mike Davis – 13 rushes, 46 yards
- LAC – Austin Ekeler – 12 rushes, 59 yards, TD

**Top receivers**

- CAR – Jason Moore – 2 receptions, 65 yards
- LAC – Keenan Allen – 13 receptions, 132 yards, TD

==== Week 4: at Tampa Bay Buccaneers ====
Week Four: Los Angeles Chargers at Tampa Bay Buccaneers – Game summary

Quarter	1	2	3	4	Total
Chargers	14	10	7	0	**31**
**Buccaneers**	7	7	14	10	**38**

at Raymond James Stadium, Tampa, Florida

- Date: October 4
- Game time: 1:00 p.m. EDT/10:00 a.m. PDT
- Game weather: Cloudy, 75 °F (24 °C)
- Game attendance: 6,383
- Referee: Brad Allen
- TV announcers (CBS): Ian Eagle, Charles Davis and Evan Washburn
- Recap, Game Book

Game information

**First quarter**

- TB – Cameron Brate 3-yard pass from Tom Brady (Ryan Succop kick), 10:00. Buccaneers 7–0. **Drive: 10 plays, 75 yards, 5:00.**
- LAC – Tyron Johnson 53-yard pass from Justin Herbert (Michael Badgley kick), 8:14. Tied 7–7. **Drive: 4 plays, 75 yards, 1:46.**
- LAC – Michael Davis 78-yard interception return (Michael Badgley kick), 3:55. Chargers 14–7.

**Second quarter**

- LAC – Donald Parham 19-yard pass from Justin Herbert (Michael Badgley kick), 8:50. Chargers 21–7. **Drive: 13 plays, 97 yards, 6:15.**
- LAC – Michael Badgley 53-yard field goal, 8:50. Chargers 24–7. **Drive: 8 plays, 31 yards, 3:17.**
- TB – Mike Evans 6-yard pass from Tom Brady (Ryan Succop kick), 0:22. Chargers 24–14. **Drive: 3 plays, 6 yards, 0:16.**

**Third quarter**

- TB – O. J. Howard 28-yard pass from Tom Brady (Ryan Succop kick), 8:22. Chargers 24–21. **Drive: 8 plays, 69 yards, 4:28.**
- TB – Scott Miller 19-yard pass from Tom Brady (Ryan Succop kick), 0:52. Buccaneers 28–24. **Drive: 2 plays, 63 yards, 0:48.**
- LAC – Jalen Guyton 72-yard pass from Justin Herbert (Michael Badgley kick), 0:00. Chargers 31–28. **Drive: 3 plays, 75 yards, 0:52.**

**Fourth quarter**

- TB – Ke'Shawn Vaughn 9-yard pass from Tom Brady (Ryan Succop kick), 11:05. Buccaneers 35–31. **Drive: 7 plays, 75 yards, 3:55.**
- TB – Ryan Succop 26-yard field goal, 2:40. Buccaneers 38–31. **Drive: 12 plays, 72 yards, 6:05.**

**Top passers**

- LAC – Justin Herbert – 20/25, 290 yards, 3 TD, INT
- TB – Tom Brady – 30/46, 369 yards, 5 TD, INT

**Top rushers**

- LAC – Justin Herbert – 5 rushes, 14 yards
- TB – Ronald Jones – 20 rushes, 111 yards

**Top receivers**

- LAC – Jalen Guyton – 1 reception, 72 yards, TD
- TB – Mike Evans – 7 receptions, 122 yards, TD

==== Week 5: at New Orleans Saints ====
Week Five: Los Angeles Chargers at New Orleans Saints – Game summary

Quarter	1	2	3	4	OT	Total
Chargers	6	14	0	7	0	**27**
**Saints**	3	7	3	14	3	**30**

at Mercedes-Benz Superdome, New Orleans, Louisiana

- Date: October 12
- Game time: 7:15 p.m. CDT/5:15 p.m. PDT
- Game weather: None (indoor stadium)
- Game attendance: 749
- Referee: Clay Martin
- TV announcers (ESPN): Steve Levy, Brian Griese, Louis Riddick and Lisa Salters
- Recap, Game Book

Game information

**First quarter**

- LAC – Keenan Allen 17-yard pass from Justin Herbert (kick failed), 6:26. Chargers 6–0. **Drive: 9 plays, 80 yards, 4:33.**
- NO – Wil Lutz 48-yard field goal, 0:00. Chargers 6–3. **Drive: 5 plays, 18 yards, 2:41.**

**Second quarter**

- LAC – Mike Williams 4-yard pass from Justin Herbert (Michael Badgley kick), 11:01. Chargers 13–3. **Drive: 7 plays, 75 yards, 3:59.**
- LAC – Hunter Henry 4-yard pass from Justin Herbert (Michael Badgley kick), 4:25. Chargers 20–3. **Drive: 3 plays, 1 yard, 1:23.**
- NO – Drew Brees 1-yard run (Wil Lutz kick), 0:14. Chargers 20–10. **Drive: 8 plays, 51 yards, 1:45.**

**Third quarter**

- NO – Wil Lutz 53-yard field goal, 4:52. Chargers 20–13. **Drive: 7 plays, 40 yards, 3:25.**

**Fourth quarter**

- NO – Jared Cook 41-yard pass from Drew Brees (Wil Lutz kick), 11:21. Tied 20–20. **Drive: 10 plays, 89 yards, 5:02.**
- LAC – Mike Williams 64-yard pass from Justin Herbert (Michael Badgley kick), 3:40. Chargers 27–20. **Drive: 4 plays, 78 yards, 2:02.**
- NO – Taysom Hill 9-yard run (Wil Lutz kick), 0:52. Tied 27–27. **Drive: 8 plays, 73 yards, 2:48.**

**Overtime**

- NO – Wil Lutz 36-yard field goal, 5:08. Saints 30–27. **Drive: 9 plays, 48 yards, 4:52.**

**Top passers**

- LAC – Justin Herbert – 20/34, 264 yards, 4 TD
- NO – Drew Brees – 33/47, 325 yards, TD, INT

**Top receivers**

- LAC – Justin Jackson – 15 rushes, 71 yards
- NO – Alvin Kamara – 11 rushes, 45 yards

**Top rushers**

- LAC – Mike Williams – 5 receptions, 109 yards, 2 TD
- NO – Emmanuel Sanders – 12 receptions, 122 yards

The Chargers face Drew Brees and the Saints for the fourth time. The Saints trailed earlier and made comeback attempts. At the conclusion of the fourth quarter, Michael Badgley attempted a game-winning field goal, but the ball hits the upright, resulting in both teams tying and going into overtime. Wil Lutz kicked a 36-yard field goal and the game continued. When Rookie quarterback, Justin Herbert, elected a 4th down conversion, his pass was completed, but Marshon Lattimore and Demario Davis stopped the Chargers from getting a 1st down, resulting in a Chargers' loss.

==== Week 7: vs. Jacksonville Jaguars ====
Week Seven: Jacksonville Jaguars at Los Angeles Chargers – Game summary

Quarter	1	2	3	4	Total
Jaguars	0	14	15	0	**29**
**Chargers**	9	7	20	3	**39**

at SoFi Stadium, Inglewood, California

- Date: October 25
- Game time: 1:25 p.m. PDT
- Game weather: Cloudy, 68 °F (20 °C)
- Game attendance: 0
- Referee: Clete Blakeman
- TV announcers (CBS): Andrew Catalon, James Lofton and Sherree Burruss
- Recap, Game Book

Game information

**First quarter**

- LAC – Michael Badgley 35-yard field goal, 10:15. Chargers 3–0. **Drive: 9 plays, 77 yards, 3:48.**
- LAC – Joe Reed 7-yard run (kick failed, wide left), 0:05. Chargers 9–0. **Drive: 11 plays, 71 yards, 5:39.**

**Second quarter**

- LAC – Donald Parham 22-yard pass from Justin Herbert (Michael Badgley kick), 10:34. Chargers 16–0. **Drive: 6 plays, 62 yards, 2:59.**
- JAX – James Robinson 4-yard run (James Robinson run), 7:46. Chargers 16–8. **Drive: 6 plays, 78 yards, 2:48.**
- JAX – James Robinson 9-yard pass from Gardner Minshew (pass failed), 0:11. Chargers 16–14. **Drive: 11 plays, 67 yards, 3:41.**

**Third quarter**

- JAX – Daniel Thomas 16-yard return of blocked punt (Josh Lambo kick), 13:21. Jaguars 21–16.
- LAC – Virgil Green 22-yard pass from Justin Herbert (run failed), 5:25. Chargers 22–21. **Drive: 6 plays, 47 yards, 2:56.**
- JAX – Chris Conley 28-yard pass from Gardner Minshew (Gardner Minshew-Ben Ellefson pass), 2:54. Jaguars 29–22. **Drive: 6 plays, 74 yards, 2:31.**
- LAC – Jalen Guyton 70-yard pass from Justin Herbert (Michael Badgley kick), 1:56. Tied 29–29. **Drive: 2 plays, 80 yards, 0:58.**
- LAC – Justin Herbert 5-yard run (Michael Badgley kick), 0:05. Chargers 36–29. **Drive: 4 plays, 19 yards, 1:42.**

**Fourth quarter**

- LAC – Michael Badgley 35-yard field goal, 6:26. Chargers 39–29. **Drive: 11 plays, 73 yards, 4:36.**

**Top passers**

- JAX – Gardner Minshew – 14/27, 173 yards, 2 TD
- LAC – Justin Herbert – 27/43, 347 yards, 3 TD

**Top rushers**

- JAX – James Robinson – 22 rushes, 119 yards, TD
- LAC – Justin Herbert – 9 rushes, 66 yards, TD

**Top receivers**

- JAX – Laviska Shenault – 3 receptions, 44 yards
- LAC – Keenan Allen – 10 receptions, 125 yards

==== Week 8: at Denver Broncos ====
Week Eight: Los Angeles Chargers at Denver Broncos – Game summary

Quarter	1	2	3	4	Total
Chargers	0	14	10	6	**30**
**Broncos**	3	0	7	21	**31**

at Empower Field at Mile High, Denver, Colorado

- Date: November 1
- Game time: 2:05 p.m. MST/1:05 p.m. PST
- Game weather: Sunny, 64 °F (18 °C)
- Game attendance: 5,231
- Referee: Carl Cheffers
- TV announcers (CBS): Greg Gumbel, Rich Gannon and Jay Feely
- Recap, Game Book

Game information

**First quarter**

- DEN – Brandon McManus 35-yard field goal, 10:02. Broncos 3–0. **Drive: 4 plays, 0 yards, 1:27.**

**Second quarter**

- LAC – Keenan Allen 9-yard pass from Justin Herbert (Michael Badgley kick), 1:48. Chargers 7–3. **Drive: 9 plays, 80 yards, 4:05.**
- LAC – Gabe Nabers 2-yard pass from Justin Herbert (Michael Badgley kick), 0:15. Chargers 14–3. **Drive: 6 plays, 80 yards, 0:56.**

**Third quarter**

- LAC – Mike Williams 24-yard pass from Justin Herbert (Michael Badgley kick), 10:13. Chargers 21–3. **Drive: 10 plays, 75 yards, 4:47.**
- LAC – Michael Badgley 52-yard field goal, 7:33. Chargers 24–3. **Drive: 8 plays, 40 yards, 1:46.**
- DEN – Phillip Lindsay 55-yard run (Brandon McManus kick), 6:05. Chargers 24–10. **Drive: 5 plays, 75 yards, 1:28.**

**Fourth quarter**

- DEN – Albert Okwuegbunam 9-yard pass from Drew Lock (Brandon McManus kick), 11:42. Chargers 24–17. **Drive: 9 plays, 80 yards, 4:54.**
- LAC – Michael Badgley 47-yard field goal, 7:57. Chargers 27–17. **Drive: 8 plays, 46 yards, 3:45.**
- DEN – DaeSean Hamilton 40-yard pass from Drew Lock (Brandon McManus kick), 7:30. Chargers 27–24. **Drive: 2 plays, 75 yards, 0:27.**
- LAC – Michael Badgley 33-yard field goal, 2:30. Chargers 30–24. **Drive: 12 plays, 60 yards, 5:00.**
- DEN – K. J. Hamler 1-yard pass from Drew Lock (Brandon McManus kick), 0:00. Broncos 31–30. **Drive: 14 plays, 81 yards, 2:30.**

**Top passers**

- LAC – Justin Herbert – 29/43, 278 yards, 3 TD, 2 INT
- DEN – Drew Lock – 26/41, 248 yards, 3 TD, INT

**Top rushers**

- LAC – Justin Jackson – 17 rushes, 89 yards
- DEN – Phillip Lindsay – 6 rushes, 83 yards, TD

**Top receivers**

- LAC – Mike Williams – 5 receptions, 99 yards, TD
- DEN – DaeSean Hamilton – 4 receptions, 82 yards, TD

==== Week 9: vs. Las Vegas Raiders ====
Week Nine: Las Vegas Raiders at Los Angeles Chargers – Game summary

Quarter	1	2	3	4	Total
**Raiders**	7	7	14	3	**31**
Chargers	0	17	3	6	**26**

at SoFi Stadium, Inglewood, California

- Date: November 8
- Game time: 1:05 p.m. PST
- Game weather: Mostly cloudy, 60 °F (16 °C)
- Game attendance: 0
- Referee: Brad Rogers
- TV announcers (Fox): Joe Davis, Mark Schlereth and Lindsay Czarniak
- Recap, Game Book

Game information

**First quarter**

- LV – Devontae Booker 23-yard run (Daniel Carlson kick), 4:48. Raiders 7–0. **Drive: 7 plays, 62 yards, 3:33.**

**Second quarter**

- LAC – Kalen Ballage 5-yard run (Michael Badgley kick), 13:24. Tied 7–7. **Drive: 13 plays, 61 yards, 6:18.**
- LV – Josh Jacobs 14-yard run (Daniel Carlson kick), 5:41. Raiders 14–7. **Drive: 6 plays, 44 yards, 3:23.**
- LAC – Keenan Allen 27-yard pass from Justin Herbert (Michael Badgley kick), 0:26. Tied 14–14. **Drive: 10 plays, 75 yards, 5:15.**
- LAC – Michael Badgley 45-yard field goal, 0:08. Chargers 17–14. **Drive: 1 play, 0 yards, 0:03.**

**Third quarter**

- LV – Nelson Agholor 45-yard pass from Derek Carr (Daniel Carlson kick), 13:18. Raiders 21–17. **Drive: 4 plays, 55 yards, 1:42.**
- LV – Darren Waller 3-yard pass from Derek Carr (Daniel Carlson kick), 7:49. Raiders 28–17. **Drive: 8 plays, 75 yards, 3:39.**
- LAC – Michael Badgley 29-yard field goal, 4:23. Raiders 28–20. **Drive: 9 plays, 62 yards, 3:30.**

**Fourth quarter**

- LAC – Gabe Nabers 4-yard pass from Justin Herbert (run failed), 9:04. Raiders 28–26. **Drive: 12 plays, 82 yards, 5:47.**
- LV – Daniel Carlson 31-yard field goal, 4:41. Raiders 31–26. **Drive: 6 plays, 18 yards, 3:30.**

**Top passers**

- LV – Derek Carr – 13/23, 165 yards, 2 TD
- LAC – Justin Herbert – 28/42, 326 yards, 2 TD

**Top rushers**

- LV – Devontae Booker – 8 rushes, 68 yards, TD
- LAC – Kalen Ballage – 15 rushes, 69 yards, TD

**Top receivers**

- LV – Hunter Renfrow – 2 receptions, 60 yards
- LAC – Keenan Allen – 9 receptions, 103 yards, TD

==== Week 10: at Miami Dolphins ====
Week Ten: Los Angeles Chargers at Miami Dolphins – Game summary

Quarter	1	2	3	4	Total
Chargers	0	7	7	7	**21**
**Dolphins**	14	3	3	9	**29**

at Hard Rock Stadium, Miami Gardens, Florida

- Date: November 15
- Game time: 4:05 p.m. EST/1:05 p.m. PST
- Game weather: Partly cloudy, 83 °F (28 °C)
- Game attendance: 12,751
- Referee: Jerome Boger
- TV announcers (CBS): Greg Gumbel, Rich Gannon and AJ Ross
- Recap, Game Book

Game information

**First quarter**

- MIA – Salvon Ahmed 1-yard run (Jason Sanders kick), 12:58. Dolphins 7–0. **Drive: 1 play, 1 yard, 0:04.**
- MIA – Jakeem Grant 3-yard pass from Tua Tagovailoa (Jason Sanders kick), 1:01. Dolphins 14–0. **Drive: 13 plays, 88 yards, 7:04.**

**Second quarter**

- LAC – Justin Herbert 1-yard run (Michael Badgley kick), 4:25. Dolphins 14–7. **Drive: 11 plays, 37 yards, 5:51.**
- MIA – Jason Sanders 50-yard field goal, 0:29. Dolphins 17–7. **Drive: 5 plays, 15 yards, 0:37.**

**Third quarter**

- LAC – Hunter Henry 2-yard pass from Justin Herbert (Michael Badgley kick), 7:02. Dolphins 17–14. **Drive: 11 plays, 68 yards, 6:38.**
- MIA – Jason Sanders 35-yard field goal, 2:34. Dolphins 20–14. **Drive: 8 plays, 58 yards, 4:28.**

**Fourth quarter**

- MIA – Durham Smythe 2-yard pass from Tua Tagovailoa (pass failed), 11:38. Dolphins 26–14. **Drive: 5 plays, 32 yards, 2:32.**
- MIA – Jason Sanders 49-yard field goal, 4:06. Dolphins 29–14. **Drive: 7 plays, 14 yards, 2:38.**
- LAC – Keenan Allen 13-yard pass from Justin Hebert (Michael Badgley kick), 1:57. Dolphins 29–21. **Drive: 8 plays, 69 yards, 2:02.**

**Top passers**

- LAC – Justin Herbert – 20/32, 187 yards, 2 TD, INT
- MIA – Tua Tagovailoa – 15/25, 169 yards, 2 TD

**Top rushers**

- LAC – Kalen Ballage – 18 rushes, 68 yards
- MIA – Salvon Ahmed – 21 rushes, 85 yards, TD

**Top receivers**

- LAC – Keenan Allen – 3 receptions, 39 yards, TD
- MIA – Jakeem Grant – 4 receptions, 43 yards, TD

==== Week 11: vs. New York Jets ====
Week Eleven: New York Jets at Los Angeles Chargers – Game summary

Quarter	1	2	3	4	Total
Jets	6	0	13	9	**28**
**Chargers**	7	17	7	3	**34**

at SoFi Stadium, Inglewood, California

- Date: November 22
- Game time: 1:05 p.m. PST
- Game weather: Clear, 69 °F (21 °C)
- Game attendance: 0
- Referee: Craig Wrolstad
- TV announcers (CBS): Greg Gumbel, Rich Gannon and Jay Feely
- Recap, Game Book

Game information

**First quarter**

- NYJ – La'Mical Perine 5-yard run (kick failed), 9:05. Jets 6–0. **Drive: 4 plays, 29 yards, 1:59.**
- LAC – Tevaughn Campbell 6-yard interception return (Michael Badgley kick), 3:20. Chargers 7–6.

**Second quarter**

- LAC – Mike Williams 39-yard pass from Justin Herbert (Michael Badgley kick), 14:17. Chargers 14–6. **Drive: 5 plays, 57 yards, 1:48.**
- LAC – Hunter Henry 2-yard pass from Justin Herbert (Michael Badgley kick), 10:01. Chargers 21–6. **Drive: 7 plays, 72 yards, 2:59.**
- LAC – Michael Badgley 44-yard field goal, 0:00. Chargers 24–6. **Drive: 7 plays, 60 yards, 1:16.**

**Third quarter**

- NYJ – Breshad Perriman 49-yard pass from Joe Flacco (Sam Ficken kick), 11:27. Chargers 24–13. **Drive: 7 plays, 74 yards, 3:33.**
- LAC – Keenan Allen 13-yard pass from Justin Herbert (Michael Badgley kick), 5:53. Chargers 31–13. **Drive: 12 plays, 75 yards, 5:54.**
- NYJ – Frank Gore 1-yard run (kick failed), 0:22. Chargers 31–19. **Drive: 10 plays, 75 yards, 5:11.**

**Fourth quarter**

- LAC – Michael Badgley 23-yard field goal, 6:42. Chargers 34–19. **Drive: 16 plays, 70 yards, 8:40.**
- NYJ – Chris Herndon 6-yard pass from Joe Flacco (Sam Ficken kick), 4:00. Chargers 34–26. **Drive: 9 plays, 75 yards, 2:42.**
- NYJ – Ty Long OB in end zone, forced by Frankie Luvu, for a Safety, 0:01. Chargers 34–28.

**Top passers**

- NYJ – Joe Flacco – 15/30, 205 yards, 2 TD, INT
- LAC – Justin Herbert – 37/49, 366 yards, 3 TD

**Top rushers**

- NYJ – Frank Gore – 15 rushes, 61 yards, TD
- LAC – Kalen Ballage – 16 rushes, 44 yards

**Top receivers**

- NYJ – Denzel Mims – 3 receptions, 71 yards
- LAC – Keenan Allen – 16 receptions, 145 yards, TD

==== Week 12: at Buffalo Bills ====
Week Twelve: Los Angeles Chargers at Buffalo Bills – Game summary

Quarter	1	2	3	4	Total
Chargers	6	0	8	3	**17**
**Bills**	7	10	7	3	**27**

at Bills Stadium, Orchard Park, New York

- Date: November 29
- Game time: 1:00 p.m. EST/10:00 a.m. PST
- Game weather: Sunny, 48 °F (9 °C)
- Game attendance: 0
- Referee: Alex Kemp
- TV announcers (CBS): Greg Gumbel, Rich Gannon and Jay Feely
- Recap, Game Book

Game information

**First quarter**

- BUF – Dawson Knox 2-yard pass from Josh Allen (Tyler Bass kick), 12:56. Bills 7–0. **Drive: 4 plays, 63 yards, 1:59.**
- LAC – Keenan Allen 5-yard pass from Justin Herbert (kick failed), 6:31. Bills 7–6. **Drive: 13 plays, 79 yards, 5:55.**

**Second quarter**

- BUF – Gabe Davis 20-yard pass from Cole Beasley (Tyler Bass kick), 9:44. Bills 14–6. **Drive: 7 plays, 76 yards, 4:21.**
- BUF – Tyler Bass 45-yard field goal, 2:16. Bills 17–6. **Drive: 12 plays, 60 yards, 5:15.**

**Third quarter**

- BUF – Josh Allen 3-yard run (Tyler Bass kick), 9:02. Bills 24–6. **Drive: 12 plays, 57 yards, 5:58.**
- LAC – Joshua Kelley 1-yard run (Justin Herbert-Keenan Allen pass), 4:51. Bills 24–14. **Drive: 10 plays, 67 yards, 4:11.**

**Fourth quarter**

- LAC – Michael Badgley 27-yard field goal, 10:16. Bills 24–17. **Drive: 7 plays, 36 yards, 3:50.**
- BUF – Tyler Bass 43-yard field goal, 3:26. Bills 27–17. **Drive: 6 plays, 40 yards, 1:51.**

**Top passers**

- LAC – Justin Herbert – 31/52, 316 yards, TD, INT
- BUF – Josh Allen – 18/24, 157 yards, TD, INT

**Top rushers**

- LAC – Austin Ekeler – 14 rushes, 44 yards
- BUF – Devin Singletary – 11 rushes, 82 yards

**Top receivers**

- LAC – Austin Ekeler – 11 receptions, 85 yards
- BUF – Gabe Davis – 3 receptions, 79 yards, TD

==== Week 13: vs. New England Patriots ====
Week Thirteen: New England Patriots at Los Angeles Chargers – Game summary

Quarter	1	2	3	4	Total
**Patriots**	7	21	7	10	**45**
Chargers	0	0	0	0	**0**

at SoFi Stadium, Inglewood, California

- Date: December 6
- Game time: 1:25 p.m. PST
- Game weather: Clear, 70 °F (21 °C)
- Game attendance: 0
- Referee: Carl Cheffers
- TV announcers (CBS): Kevin Harlan, Trent Green and Amanda Balionis
- Recap, Game Book

Game information

**First quarter**

- NE – Cam Newton 1-yard run (Nick Folk kick), 7:50. Patriots 7–0. **Drive: 13 plays, 75 yards, 7:10.**

**Second quarter**

- NE – Gunner Olszewski 70-yard punt return (Nick Folk kick), 14:02. Patriots 14–0.
- NE – Cam Newton 2-yard run (Nick Folk kick), 0:51. Patriots 21–0. **Drive: 16 plays, 54 yards, 5:41.**
- NE – Devin McCourty 44-yard return of blocked field goal (Nick Folk kick), 0:00. Patriots 28–0.

**Third quarter**

- NE – N'Keal Harry 5-yard pass from Cam Newton (Nick Folk kick), 8:44. Patriots 35–0. **Drive: 7 plays, 32 yards, 3:38.**

**Fourth quarter**

- NE – Nick Folk 32-yard field goal, 11:21. Patriots 38–0. **Drive: 4 plays, 3 yards, 2:04.**
- NE – Gunner Olszewski 38-yard pass from Jarrett Stidham (Nick Folk kick), 6:50. Patriots 45–0. **Drive: 4 plays, 61 yards, 1:23.**

**Top passers**

- NE – Cam Newton – 12/19, 69 yards, TD
- LAC – Justin Herbert – 26/53, 209 yards, 2 INT

**Top rushers**

- NE – Damien Harris – 16 rushes, 80 yards
- LAC – Austin Ekeler – 8 rushes, 36 yards

**Top receivers**

- NE – Gunner Olszewski – 1 reception, 38 yards, TD
- LAC – Keenan Allen – 5 receptions, 48 yards

With the shutout loss against New England, which marked their 5th straight loss to the Patriots since 2008, Los Angeles fell to 3–9 and was mathematically eliminated from playoff contention.

==== Week 14: vs. Atlanta Falcons ====
Week Fourteen: Atlanta Falcons at Los Angeles Chargers – Game summary

Quarter	1	2	3	4	Total
Falcons	7	10	0	0	**17**
**Chargers**	7	3	7	3	**20**

at SoFi Stadium, Inglewood, California

- Date: December 13
- Game time: 1:25 p.m. PST
- Game weather: None (indoor stadium)
- Game attendance: 0
- Referee: Tony Corrente
- TV announcers (Fox): Joe Davis, Brock Huard and Jenny Taft
- Recap, Game Book

Game information

**First quarter**

- LAC – Keenan Allen 10-yard pass from Justin Herbert (Michael Badgley kick), 3:57. Chargers 7–0. **Drive: 15 plays, 83 yards, 9:33.**
- ATL – Calvin Ridley 39-yard pass from Russell Gage (Younghoe Koo kick), 0:21. Tied 7–7. **Drive: 7 plays, 75 yards, 3:36.**

**Second quarter**

- ATL – Younghoe Koo 45-yard field goal, 9:47. Falcons 10–7. **Drive: 8 plays, 40 yards, 3:46.**
- LAC – Michael Badgley 35-yard field goal, 8:13. Tied 10–10. **Drive: 4 plays, 6 yards 1:34.**
- ATL – Laquon Treadwell 9-yard pass from Matt Ryan (Younghoe Koo kick), 4:51. Falcons 17–10. **Drive: 8 plays, 75 yards, 3:22.**

**Third quarter**

- LAC – Tyron Johnson 12-yard pass from Justin Herbert (Michael Badgley kick), 1:10. Tied 17–17. **Drive: 13 plays, 85 yards, 8:21.**

**Fourth quarter**

- LAC – Michael Badgley 43-yard field goal, 0:00. Chargers 20–17. **Drive: 6 plays, 49 yards, 0:30.**

**Top passers**

- ATL – Matt Ryan – 21/31, 224 yards, TD, 3 INT
- LAC – Justin Herbert – 33/40, 195 yards, 2 TD, INT

**Top rushers**

- ATL – Ito Smith – 11 rushes, 42 yards
- LAC – Austin Ekeler – 12 rushes, 63 yards

**Top receivers**

- ATL – Calvin Ridley – 8 receptions, 124 yards, TD
- LAC – Austin Ekeler – 9 receptions, 67 yards

Chargers record their first home win against the Falcons, snapping a six-game home losing streak to them.

==== Week 15: at Las Vegas Raiders ====
Week Fifteen: Los Angeles Chargers at Las Vegas Raiders – Game summary

Quarter	1	2	3	4	OT	Total
**Chargers**	7	10	7	0	6	**30**
Raiders	3	7	7	7	3	**27**

at Allegiant Stadium, Paradise, Nevada

- Date: December 17
- Game time: 5:20 p.m. PST
- Game weather: None (indoor stadium)
- Game attendance: 0
- Referee: John Hussey
- TV announcers (Fox/NFLN/Amazon Prime Video): Joe Buck, Troy Aikman, Erin Andrews and Kristina Pink
- Recap, Game Book

Game information

**First quarter**

- LAC – Hunter Henry 10-yard pass from Justin Herbert (Michael Badgley kick), 5:56. Chargers 7–0. **Drive: 12 plays, 78 yards, 7:29.**
- LV – Daniel Carlson 23-yard field goal, 0:55. Chargers 7–3. **Drive: 9 plays, 70 yards, 5:01.**

**Second quarter**

- LV – Darren Waller 35-yard pass from Marcus Mariota (Daniel Carlson kick), 9:19. Raiders 10–7. **Drive: 7 plays, 86 yards, 4:10.**
- LAC – Michael Badgley 22-yard field goal, 1:56. Tied 10–10. **Drive: 14 plays, 71 yards, 7:27.**
- LAC – Tyron Johnson 26-yard pass from Justin Herbert (Michael Badgley kick), 0:19. Chargers 17–10. **Drive: 4 plays, 49 yards, 0:41.**

**Third quarter**

- LV – Josh Jacobs 1-yard run (Daniel Carlson kick), 7:18. Tied 17–17. **Drive: 10 plays, 76 yards, 5:23.**
- LAC – Kalen Ballage 1-yard run (Michael Badgley kick), 2:08. Chargers 24–17. **Drive: 12 plays, 75 yards, 5:10.**

**Fourth quarter**

- LV – Marcus Mariota 2-yard run (Daniel Carlson kick), 6:16. Tied 24–24. **Drive: 19 plays, 75 yards, 10:52.**

**Overtime**

- LV – Daniel Carlson 23-yard field goal, 3:22. Raiders 27–24. **Drive: 14 plays, 70 yards, 6:42.**
- LAC – Justin Herbert 1-yard run, 1:32. Chargers 30–27. **Drive: 5 plays, 75 yards, 1:49.**

**Top passers**

- LAC – Justin Herbert – 22/32, 314 yards, 2 TD
- LV – Marcus Mariota – 17/28, 226 yards, TD, INT

**Top rushers**

- LAC – Austin Ekeler – 13 rushes, 60 yards
- LV – Marcus Mariota – 9 rushes, 88 yards, TD

**Top receivers**

- LAC – Jalen Guyton – 4 receptions, 91 yards
- LV – Darren Waller – 9 receptions, 150 yards, TD

==== Week 16: vs. Denver Broncos ====
Week Sixteen: Denver Broncos at Los Angeles Chargers – Game summary

Quarter	1	2	3	4	Total
Broncos	0	0	3	13	**16**
**Chargers**	3	10	0	6	**19**

at SoFi Stadium, Inglewood, California

- Date: December 27
- Game time: 1:05 p.m. PST
- Game weather: Partly cloudy, 61 °F (16 °C)
- Game attendance: 0
- Referee: Shawn Hochuli
- TV announcers (CBS): Spero Dedes, Adam Archuleta and Amanda Balionis
- Recap, Game Book

Game information

**First quarter**

- LAC – Michael Badgley 37-yard field goal, 12:53. Chargers 3–0. **Drive: 5 plays, 20 yards, 2:07.**

**Second quarter**

- LAC – Austin Ekeler 9-yard pass from Justin Herbert (Michael Badgley kick), 8:23. Chargers 10–0. **Drive: 9 plays, 73 yards, 4:58.**
- LAC – Michael Badgley 43-yard field goal, 2:38. Chargers 13–0. **Drive: 9 plays, 40 yards, 3:48.**

**Third quarter**

- DEN – Brandon McManus 30-yard field goal, 5:07. Chargers 13–3. **Drive: 8 plays, 41 yards, 3:42.**

**Fourth quarter**

- LAC – Michael Badgley 25-yard field goal, 14:50. Chargers 16–3. **Drive: 11 plays, 68 yards, 5:17.**
- DEN – Brandon McManus 50-yard field goal, 11:18. Chargers 16–6. **Drive: 9 plays, 48 yards, 3:32.**
- DEN – Drew Lock 1-yard run (Brandon McManus kick), 6:31. Chargers 16–13. **Drive: 11 plays, 72 yards, 3:50.**
- DEN – Brandon McManus 52-yard field goal, 2:42. Tied 16–16. **Drive: 6 plays, 25 yards, 2:43.**
- LAC – Michael Badgley 37-yard field goal, 0:41. Chargers 19–16. **Drive: 7 plays, 56 yards, 2:01.**

**Top passers**

- DEN – Drew Lock – 24/47, 264 yards, 2 INT
- LAC – Justin Herbert – 21/33, 253 yards, TD

**Top rushers**

- DEN – Melvin Gordon – 16 rushes, 79 yards
- LAC – Austin Ekeler – 14 rushes, 45 yards

**Top receivers**

- DEN – DaeSean Hamilton – 5 receptions, 77 yards
- LAC – Mike Williams – 4 receptions, 54 yards

==== Week 17: at Kansas City Chiefs ====
Week Seventeen: Los Angeles Chargers at Kansas City Chiefs – Game summary

Quarter	1	2	3	4	Total
**Chargers**	7	17	7	7	**38**
Chiefs	7	7	0	7	**21**

at Arrowhead Stadium, Kansas City, Missouri

- Date: January 3, 2021
- Game time: 3:25 p.m. CST/1:25 p.m. PST
- Game weather: Cloudy, 35 °F (2 °C)
- Game attendance: 13,240
- Referee: Clete Blakeman
- TV announcers (Fox): Kevin Kugler, Brock Huard and Laura Okmin
- Recap, Game Book

Game information

**First quarter**

- KC – Byron Pringle 3-yard pass from Chad Henne (Harrison Butker kick), 11:19. Chiefs 7–0. **Drive: 7 plays, 56 yards, 3:41.**
- LAC – Donald Parham 8-yard pass from Justin Herbert (Michael Badgley kick), 4:23. Tied 7–7. **Drive: 12 plays, 75 yards, 6:56.**

**Second quarter**

- KC – Darwin Thompson 1-yard run (Harrison Butker kick), 13:41. Chiefs 14–7. **Drive: 12 plays, 72 yards, 5:42.**
- LAC – Austin Ekeler 4-yard pass from Justin Herbert (Michael Badgley kick), 9:51. Tied 14–14. **Drive: 4 plays, 17 yards, 2:06.**
- LAC – Isaac Rochell safety, 1:43. Chargers 16–14.
- LAC – Justin Herbert 1-yard run (Justin Herbert–Justin Jackson pass), 0:16. Chargers 24–14. **Drive: 5 plays, 59 yards, 1:27.**

**Third quarter**

- LAC – Mike Williams 48-yard pass from Justin Herbert (Michael Badgley kick), 0:47. Chargers 31–14. **Drive: 6 plays, 70 yards, 3:17.**

**Fourth quarter**

- KC – Darwin Thompson 8-yard pass from Chad Henne (Harrison Butker kick), 11:49. Chargers 31–21. **Drive: 9 plays, 74 yards, 3:58.**
- LAC – Kalen Ballage 1-yard run (Michael Badgley kick), 8:09. Chargers 38–21. **Drive: 6 plays, 77 yards, 3:40.**

**Top passers**

- LAC – Justin Herbert – 22/31, 302 yards, 3 TD
- KC – Chad Henne – 23/32, 218 yards, 2 TD

**Top rushers**

- LAC – Justin Jackson – 9 rushes, 72 yards
- KC – Darwin Thompson – 14 rushes, 45 yards, TD

**Top receivers**

- LAC – Mike Williams – 6 receptions, 108 yards, TD
- KC – Darwin Thompson – 7 receptions, 65 yards, TD

=== Standings ===
==== Division ====
AFC West
	W	L	T	PCT	DIV	CONF	PF	PA	STK
^{(1)} Kansas City Chiefs	14	2	0	.875	4–2	10–2	473	362	L1
Las Vegas Raiders	8	8	0	.500	4–2	6–6	434	478	W1
Los Angeles Chargers	7	9	0	.438	3–3	6–6	384	426	W4
Denver Broncos	5	11	0	.313	1–5	4–8	323	446	L3

==== Conference ====
AFC
#	Team	Division	W	L	T	PCT	DIV	CONF	SOS	SOV	STK
**Division leaders**
1	Kansas City Chiefs	West	14	2	0	.875	4–2	10–2	.465	.464	L1
2	Buffalo Bills	East	13	3	0	.813	6–0	10–2	.512	.471	W6
3	Pittsburgh Steelers	North	12	4	0	.750	4–2	9–3	.475	.448	L1
4 (Note: Tennessee finished ahead of Indianapolis in the AFC South based on division record.)	Tennessee Titans	South	11	5	0	.688	5–1	8–4	.475	.398	W1
**Wild cards**
5 (Note: Baltimore claimed the No. 5 seed over Indianapolis based on head-to-head victory. Division tiebreaker used to eliminate Cleveland (see below).) (Note: Baltimore claimed the No. 5 seed over Cleveland based on head-to-head sweep.)	Baltimore Ravens	North	11	5	0	.688	4–2	7–5	.494	.401	W5
6 (Note: Cleveland claimed the No. 6 seed over Indianapolis based on head-to-head victory.)	Cleveland Browns	North	11	5	0	.688	3–3	7–5	.451	.406	W1
7	Indianapolis Colts	South	11	5	0	.688	4–2	7–5	.443	.384	W1
**Did not qualify for the postseason**
8	Miami Dolphins	East	10	6	0	.625	3–3	7–5	.467	.347	L1
9	Las Vegas Raiders	West	8	8	0	.500	4–2	6–6	.539	.477	W1
10 (Note: New England finished ahead of the LA Chargers based on head-to-head victory.)	New England Patriots	East	7	9	0	.438	3–3	6–6	.527	.429	W1
11	Los Angeles Chargers	West	7	9	0	.438	3–3	6–6	.482	.344	W4
12	Denver Broncos	West	5	11	0	.313	1–5	4–8	.566	.388	L3
13	Cincinnati Bengals	North	4	11	1	.281	1–5	4–8	.529	.438	L1
14	Houston Texans	South	4	12	0	.250	2–4	3–9	.541	.219	L5
15	New York Jets	East	2	14	0	.125	0–6	1–11	.594	.656	L1
16	Jacksonville Jaguars	South	1	15	0	.063	1–5	1–11	.549	.688	L15
**Tiebreakers** (Note: When breaking ties for three or more teams under the NFL's rules, they are first broken within divisions, then comparing only the highest ranked remaining team from each division.)
