= Donald Parham =

American football player (born 1997)

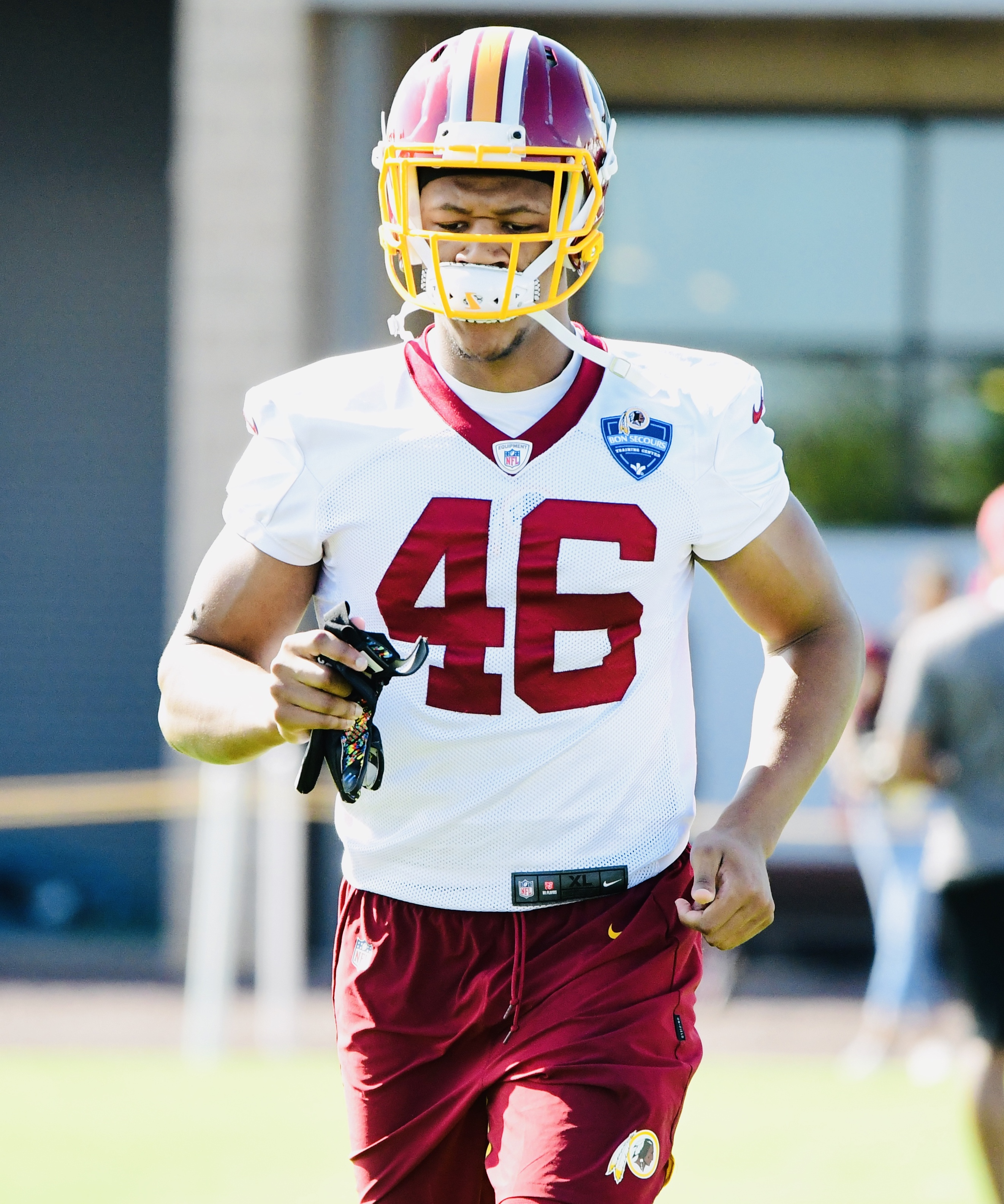
- Parham with the Washington Redskins in 2019

Profile
- Position: Tight end

Personal information
- Born: August 16, 1997 (age 29); Lakeland, Florida, U.S.
- Listed height: 6 ft 8 in (2.03 m)
- Listed weight: 237 lb (108 kg)

Career information
- High school: Lake Gibson (Lakeland)
- College: Stetson (2015–2018)
- NFL draft: 2019: undrafted

Career history
- Detroit Lions (2019)*; Washington Redskins (2019)*; Arlington Renegades (2020); Los Angeles Chargers (2020–2023); Denver Broncos (2024)*; Pittsburgh Steelers (2025)
- * Offseason or practice squad member only

Awards and highlights
- First-team FCS All-American (2018); First-team All-PFL (2018)

Career NFL statistics as of 2026
- Receptions: 67
- Receiving yards: 764
- Receiving touchdowns: 11
- Stats at Pro Football Reference

Donald Durand Parham Jr. (born August 16, 1997) is an American professional football tight end. He played college football for the Stetson Hatters, and signed with the Detroit Lions as an undrafted free agent in 2019. He has previously played for the Los Angeles Chargers.

== Early life and college ==
Parham grew up in Lakeland, Florida, where he initially excelled playing basketball at Lake Gibson High School. Despite coming from a rich lineage of football players, including his father and four uncles who all played college football, Parham didn't play football until his senior season. He excelled at wide receiver and defensive end, and committed to play college football at Stetson.

After seeing minimal action in four games a freshman, Parham took on a large role as a sophomore, converting to tight end and playing in 11 games (6 starts), recording 37 catches for 455 yards and a team-leading six touchdown receptions. As a junior, Parham led Stetson's pass-catchers with 58 receptions for 817 yards and a touchdown, and was named Honorable Mention All-Conference. During his senior season, he had 85 receptions for 1,319 yards and 13 touchdowns, and was voted FCS First-Team All-American for his efforts.

Parham finished his career as Stetson's all-time leading receiver, recording 180 receptions for 2,591 yards and 20 touchdowns. He was selected to participate in the NFLPA Bowl and Senior Bowl upon the conclusion of his college career.

== Professional career ==
Pre-draft measurables
Height	Weight	Arm length	Hand span	40-yard dash	10-yard split	20-yard split	20-yard shuttle	Three-cone drill	Vertical jump	Broad jump	Bench press
6 ft 8 3/8 in (2.04 m)	240 lb (109 kg)	36 1/8 in (0.92 m)	10 1/2 in (0.27 m)	4.68 s	1.68 s	2.75 s	4.51 s	7.53 s	38.5 in (0.98 m)	10 ft 5 in (3.18 m)	17 reps
All values from NFL Combine

=== Detroit Lions ===
On May 10, 2019, Parham signed with the Detroit Lions after going undrafted in the 2019 NFL draft. He was waived on May 12, 2019.

=== Washington Redskins ===
He signed with the Washington Redskins on June 7, 2019, after a minicamp tryout. Parham was waived on August 31, 2019, but re-signed to their practice squad on September 12. He was released on September 17, 2019.

=== Arlington Renegades ===
Parham was selected by the Arlington Renegades of the XFL in the ninth round of the 2020 XFL draft. In his second game versus the Los Angeles Wildcats, Parham made five catches for 76 yards and a touchdown. He had his contract terminated when the league suspended operations on April 10, 2020.

=== Los Angeles Chargers ===
Parham signed with the Los Angeles Chargers on April 14, 2020. During his first game in week 4 against the Tampa Bay Buccaneers, Parham recorded his first career reception, a 19-yard touchdown pass from rookie quarterback Justin Herbert, during the 38–31 loss.

While attempting to catch a pass during a week 15 game against the Kansas City Chiefs in 2021, Parham dove for a ball in the back of the end zone. Without contacting an opponent he landed on his elbow and then rolled onto his back, which caused his head to make contact with the ground and go unconscious and demonstrated a fencing pose with rigid arms. After about 10 minutes, with arms still rigid and hands shaking, he was taken to Harbor–UCLA Medical Center and was said to be in stable condition, undergoing tests for a head injury. He was placed on injured reserve on December 25.

On November 5, 2022, Parham was placed on injured reserve. He was activated on December 17.

On March 17, 2023, Parham signed a two-year contract with the Chargers worth $2.535 million.

Parham was released by the Chargers as part of final roster cuts on August 27, 2024.

=== Denver Broncos ===
On August 28, 2024, Parham was signed to the Denver Broncos practice squad.

=== Pittsburgh Steelers ===
On February 21, 2025, Parham was signed by the Pittsburgh Steelers on a one-year deal. On June 3, Parham tore his Achilles during OTAs, ending his 2025 season prematurely.

== NFL career statistics ==
Legend
**Bold**	Career high

Year	Team	Games		Receiving					Fumbles	
Year	Team	GP	GS	Rec	Yds	Avg	Lng	TD	FUM	Lost
2020	LAC	13	5	10	159	**15.9**	**26**	3	0	0
2021	LAC	14	9	20	190	9.5	22	3	0	0
2022	LAC	6	1	10	130	13.0	24	1	0	0
2023	LAC	14	8	**27**	**285**	10.6	24	**4**	0	0
Career		47	23	67	764	11.4	26	11	0	0
