= Tyron Billy-Johnson =

American football player (born 1996)

Profile
- Position: Wide receiver

Personal information
- Born: January 8, 1996 (age 30); New Orleans, Louisiana, U.S.
- Listed height: 6 ft 1 in (1.85 m)
- Listed weight: 193 lb (88 kg)

Career information
- High school: Warren Easton (New Orleans, Louisiana)
- College: LSU (2015); Oklahoma State (2016–2018)
- NFL draft: 2019: undrafted

Career history
- Houston Texans (2019)*; Buffalo Bills (2019)*; Houston Texans (2019)*; Carolina Panthers (2019)*; Los Angeles Chargers (2019–2020); Jacksonville Jaguars (2021); Las Vegas Raiders (2021–2022); Houston Texans (2022); Cincinnati Bengals (2022)*; San Francisco 49ers (2023)*; Dallas Cowboys (2023–2024)*; Birmingham Stallions (2025)*
- * Offseason or practice squad member only

Career NFL statistics as of 2023
- Receptions: 23
- Receiving yards: 422
- Receiving touchdowns: 3
- Stats at Pro Football Reference

Tyron Billy-Johnson (born January 8, 1996) is an American professional football wide receiver. He was signed by the Houston Texans as an undrafted free agent in 2019. He played college football at Oklahoma State.

== Early life ==
In his senior year of high school football, Johnson had 94 reception 1,589 yards and 17 touchdowns. He was an Academic All-Big Twelve his sophomore and junior years at OSU. He had an impressive Pro Day catching passes from Cornelius and putting up a top 40-yard dash 4.34.

He graduated from Warren Easton High School in New Orleans, Louisiana where he was an All-American and a top receiver recruit at top collegiate football programs.

== College career ==
During his two years at Oklahoma State he had 80 catches 1,288 yards in 26 games. Johnson entered the draft after his junior year at OSU. He was initially signed by LSU out of high school in 2015 but transferred to Oklahoma State.

Johnson played for Oklahoma State University (OSU) including his last year at OSU as a junior with quarterback Taylor Cornelius when he caught 53 passes for 845 receiving yards and seven touchdowns.

== Professional career ==
Pre-draft measurables
Height	Weight	Arm length	Hand span	40-yard dash	10-yard split	20-yard split	20-yard shuttle	Three-cone drill	Vertical jump	Broad jump	Bench press
6 ft 0 7/8 in (1.85 m)	193 lb (88 kg)	30 7/8 in (0.78 m)	9 1/4 in (0.23 m)	4.36 s	1.57 s	2.53 s	4.40 s	7.07 s	30.0 in (0.76 m)	9 ft 8 in (2.95 m)	16 reps
All values from Pro Day

=== Houston Texans (first stint) ===
On April 27, 2019, Johnson signed a contract with the Houston Texans. He was waived on August 31, 2019

=== Buffalo Bills ===
On September 2, 2019, Johnson was signed to the practice squad of the Buffalo Bills. He was released on September 18.

=== Houston Texans (second stint) ===
On September 23, 2019, Johnson was signed to the Texans practice squad, but was released two days later.

=== Carolina Panthers ===
On October 2, 2019, Johnson was signed to the Carolina Panthers practice squad. He was released on October 15.

=== Los Angeles Chargers ===
On December 3, 2019, Johnson was signed to the Los Angeles Chargers practice squad. He signed a futures contract with the Chargers on December 30, 2019.

On September 5, 2020, Johnson was waived by the Chargers and signed to the practice squad the next day. He was elevated to the active roster on October 3 for the team's week 4 game against the Tampa Bay Buccaneers, and recorded his first career reception in the game, a 53-yard touchdown pass from rookie quarterback Justin Herbert. He reverted to the practice squad after the game on October 5, and was promoted to the active roster on October 9. He played sparingly throughout the season, finishing with 20 receptions in 12 games, but 3 touchdowns, one against the Buccaneers, Atlanta Falcons and Las Vegas Raiders each.

On August 31, 2021, Johnson was waived by the Chargers.

=== Jacksonville Jaguars ===
On September 1, 2021, Johnson was claimed off waivers by the Jacksonville Jaguars. He played in five games, but only had one reception, before he was waived on November 16.

=== Las Vegas Raiders ===
On November 18, 2021, Johnson was signed to the Raiders practice squad. He was promoted to the active roster on January 8, 2022. He was released on October 7, 2022 and re-signed to the practice squad. He was released on October 22.

=== Houston Texans (third stint) ===
On October 25, 2022, Johnson was signed to the Texans active roster. He was waived on November 16.

=== Cincinnati Bengals ===
On November 29, 2022, Johnson was signed to the Cincinnati Bengals practice squad.

=== San Francisco 49ers ===
On February 6, 2023, Johnson signed a reserve/future contract with the San Francisco 49ers. He was waived on May 11, 2023.

=== Dallas Cowboys ===
On June 5, 2023, Johnson signed with the Dallas Cowboys. He was released on August 29, 2023 and re-signed to the practice squad. He was released on January 4, 2024, and later re-signed on April 30.

Johnson was waived by the Cowboys on August 26, 2024.

=== Birmingham Stallions ===
On January 16, 2025, Johnson signed with the Birmingham Stallions of the United Football League (UFL). He was released on March 20, 2025.
