= Gabe Nabers =

American football player (born 1997)

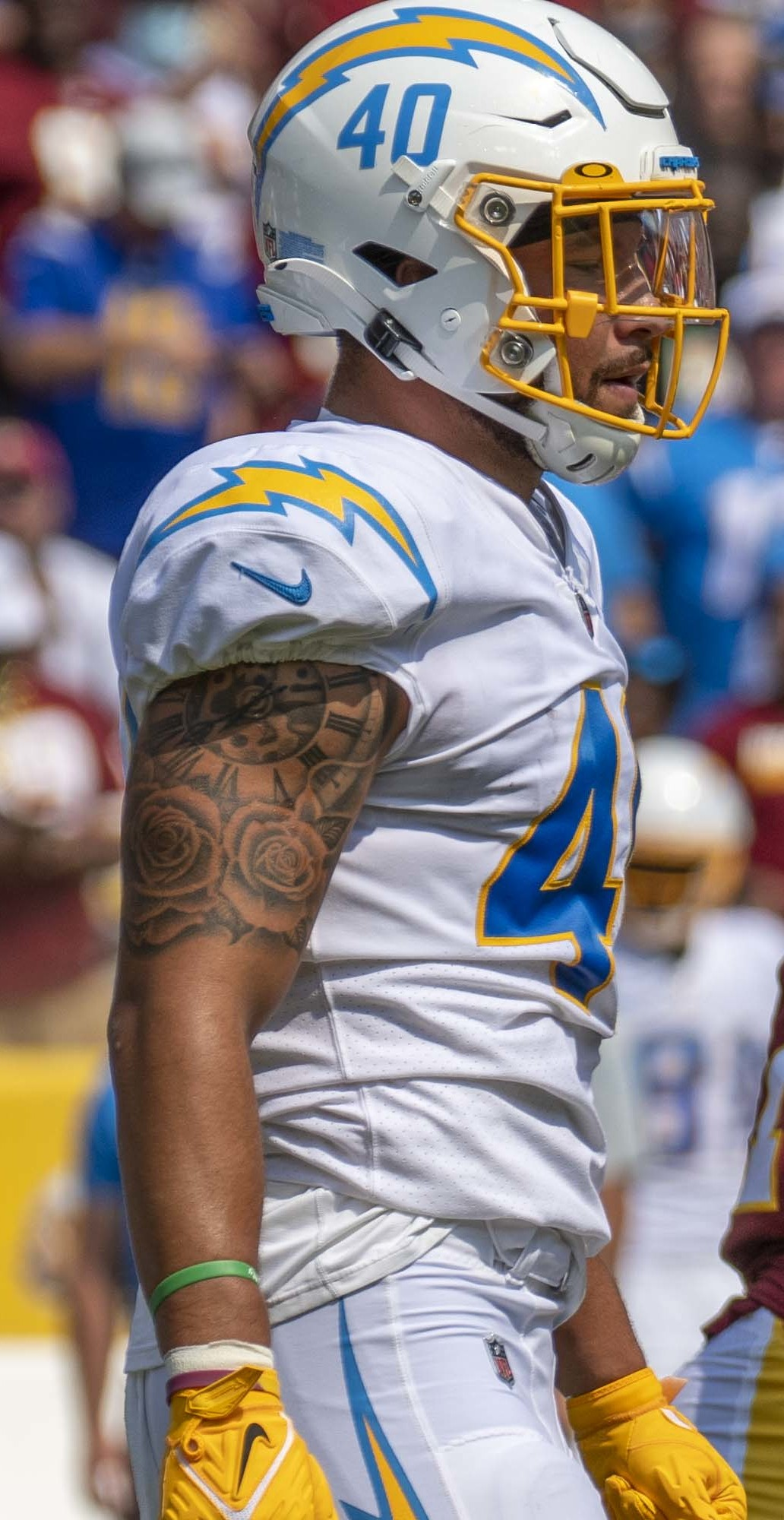
- Nabers with the Los Angeles Chargers in 2021

No. 40
- Position: Fullback

Personal information
- Born: November 5, 1997 (age 29); Hahira, Georgia, U.S.
- Listed height: 6 ft 3 in (1.91 m)
- Listed weight: 235 lb (107 kg)

Career information
- High school: Lowndes (Valdosta, Georgia)
- College: Florida State (2016–2019)
- NFL draft: 2020: undrafted

Career history
- Los Angeles Chargers (2020–2021)

Career NFL statistics
- Rushing yards: 15
- Rushing average: 3
- Receptions: 8
- Receiving yards: 42
- Receiving touchdowns: 2
- Stats at Pro Football Reference

Gabriel Eugene Nabers (born November 5, 1997) is an American former professional football player who was a fullback for the Los Angeles Chargers of the National Football League (NFL). He played college football at Florida State.

== Early life ==
Nabers attended and played high school football at Lowndes High School. As a senior, he was named the Georgia 1-6A Utility Player of the Year after finishing the season with 17 receptions for 173 yards and six touchdowns with 26 tackles, 4.5 tackles for loss, one sack, one interception, two pass breakups, and a blocked kick on defense. Nabers was rated a two-star recruit and originally committed to play college football at Georgia Southern before de-committing and signing to play at Florida State after receiving an offer from the school.

== College career ==
Nabers was a member of the Florida State Seminoles for four seasons. He played mostly on special teams for his first two seasons and scored a touchdown on his first career reception as a sophomore against Delaware State. As a senior, he had 15 catches for 221 yards and two touchdowns. He finished his collegiate career with 19 receptions for 269 yards and three touchdowns.

== Professional career ==
Pre-draft measurables
Height	Weight
6 ft 1 3/4 in (1.87 m)	243 lb (110 kg)
All values from Pro Day

Nabers was signed by the Los Angeles Chargers as an undrafted free agent on April 25, 2020. He was waived on September 5, 2020, and signed to the practice squad the next day. The Chargers elevated Nabers to their active roster on September 12, 2020, and he made his NFL debut the next day against the Cincinnati Bengals. He reverted to the practice squad on September 14. He was promoted to the active roster on September 17. Nabers rushed for four yards on his first career carry and caught a five-yard pass from Justin Herbert for his first career reception in a 38–31 loss to the Tampa Bay Buccaneers on October 4, 2020. In Week 8, against the Denver Broncos, he scored his first professional touchdown on a two-yard pass in the 31–30 loss.

On August 30, 2022, Nabers was waived by the Chargers.

== Personal life ==
Nabers' nephew, Malik, played college football at LSU from 2021 to 2023 and was drafted by the New York Giants in the first round of the 2024 NFL draft.
