= Justin Herbert =

American football player (born 1998)

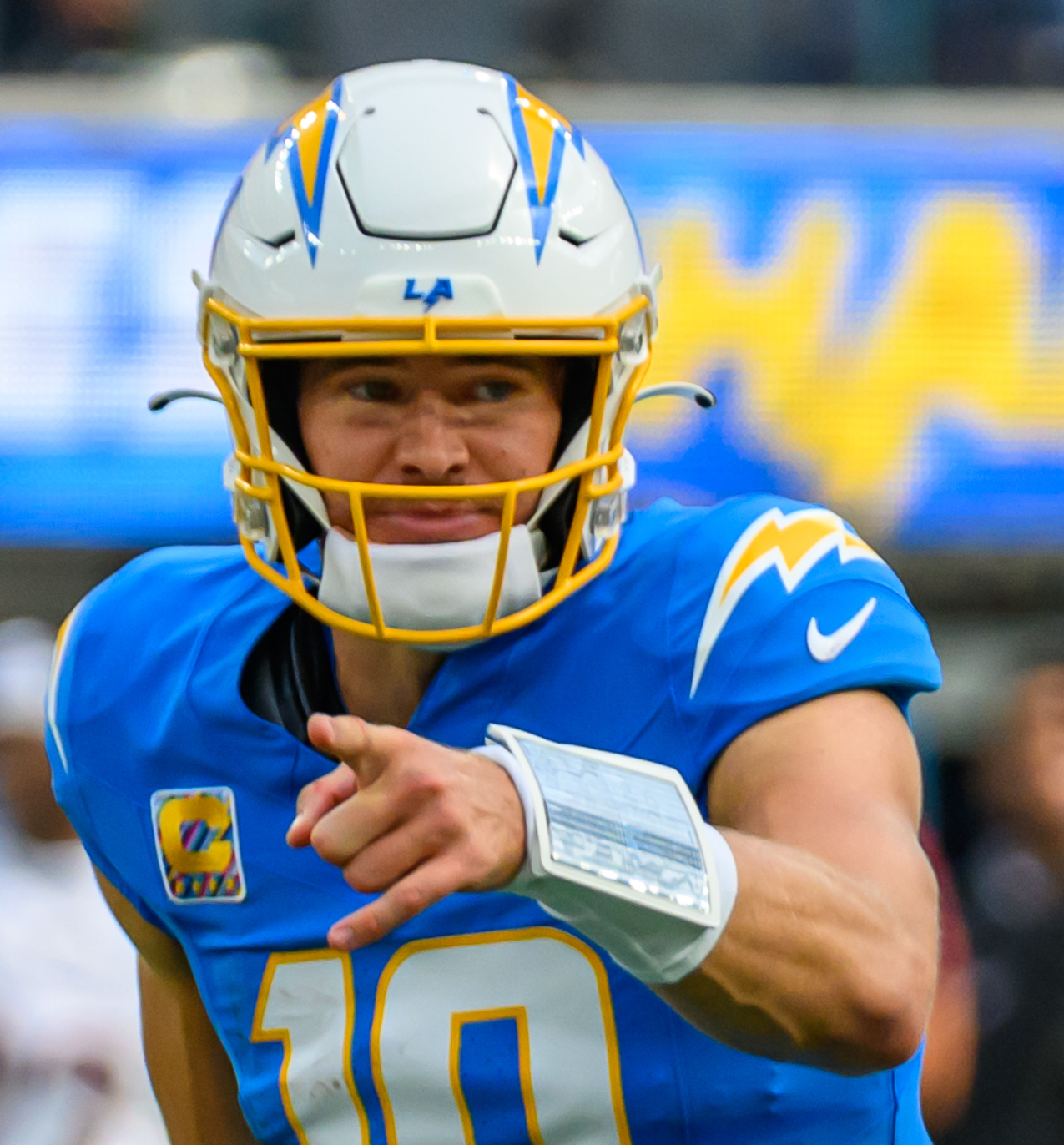
- Herbert with the Los Angeles Chargers in 2025

No. 10 – Los Angeles Chargers
- Position: Quarterback
- Roster status: Active

Personal information
- Born: March 10, 1998 (age 28); Eugene, Oregon, U.S.
- Listed height: 6 ft 6 in (1.98 m)
- Listed weight: 236 lb (107 kg)

Career information
- High school: Sheldon (Eugene)
- College: Oregon (2016–2019)
- NFL draft: 2020: 1st round, 6th overall pick

Career history
- Los Angeles Chargers (2020–present)

Awards and highlights
- NFL Offensive Rookie of the Year (2020); 2× Pro Bowl (2021, 2025); William V. Campbell Trophy (2019); NFL records: Most passing touchdowns by a rookie: 31; Most pass completions by a rookie: 396

Career NFL statistics as of Week 10, 2026
- Passing attempts: 3,691
- Passing completions: 2,441
- Completion percentage: 66.1%
- TD–INT: 169–69
- Passing yards: 26,540
- Passer rating: 94.6
- Rushing yards: 1,956
- Rushing touchdowns: 16
- Stats at Pro Football Reference

Justin Patrick Herbert (born March 10, 1998) is an American professional football quarterback for the Los Angeles Chargers of the National Football League (NFL). He played college football for the Oregon Ducks, where he won the 2019 Pac-12 Championship, and was selected by the Chargers as the sixth overall pick in the 2020 NFL draft.

Herbert became the Chargers' starting quarterback in the second game of his rookie season. He remained the starter for the rest of the season and set several rookie statistical records, including the most touchdown passes and 300-yard games. He was named the AP NFL Offensive Rookie of the Year for his performance. In 2021, he became the first quarterback in Chargers history to throw for over 5,000 yards and was named to his first Pro Bowl. He signed a five-year, $262.5 million contract extension ahead of the 2023 season.

== Early life ==
Herbert was born in Eugene, Oregon, on March 10, 1998, and attended Sheldon High School, where he played football, basketball, and baseball. During the third football game of his junior season, he suffered a broken leg, complicating his recruitment process. As a senior, Herbert passed for 3,130 yards and 37 touchdowns, and rushed for 543 yards and 10 touchdowns. He was named first-team All-State and the Southwest Conference Offensive Player of the Year. Northern Arizona, Portland State, and Montana State extended offers before Nevada and Oregon followed up with his only NCAA Division I Football Bowl Subdivision offers. Herbert committed to Oregon in October 2015. Herbert also co-founded the Sheldon High School Fishing Club while in high school and served as their president.

== College career ==
=== 2016 season ===
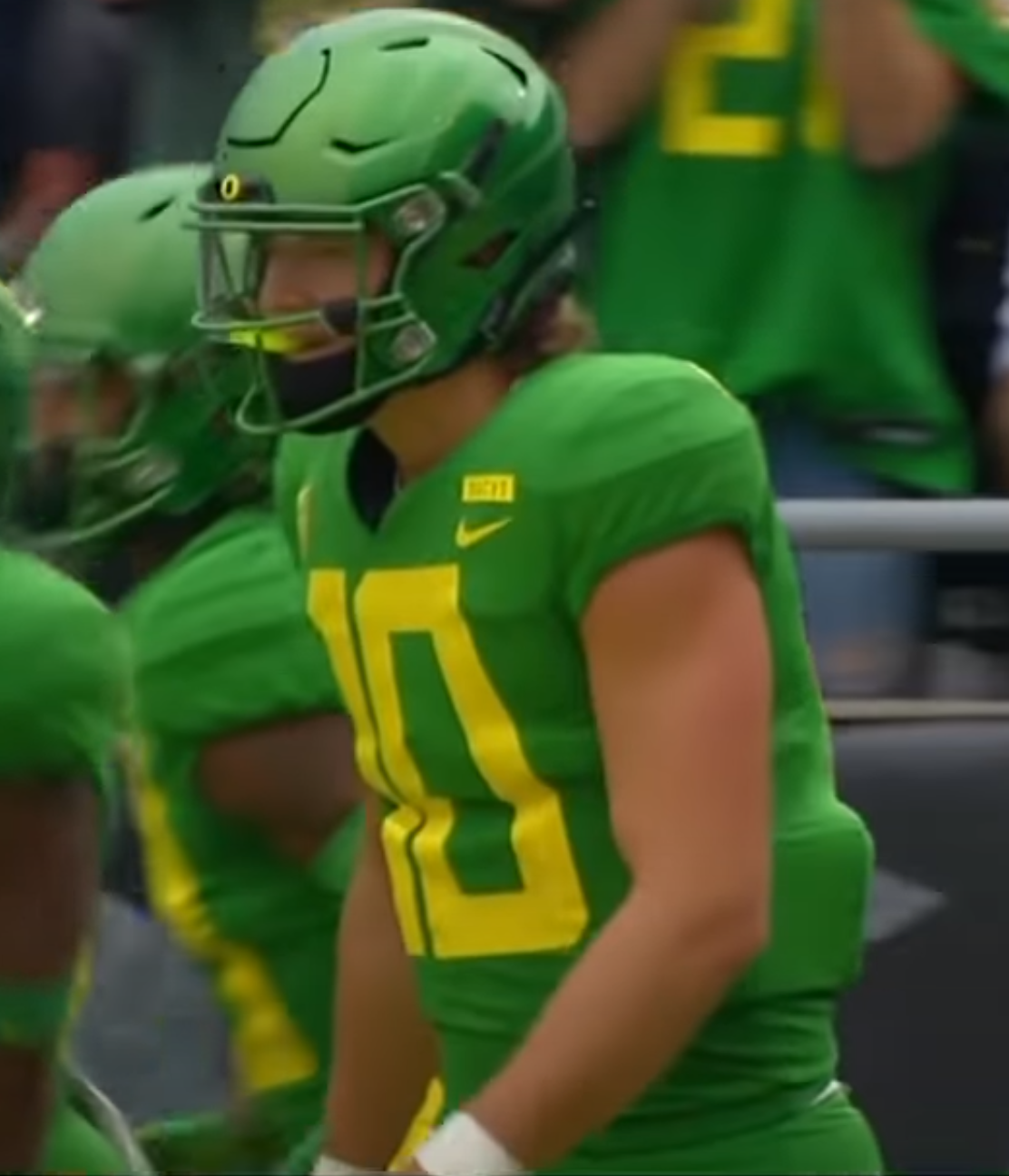
Herbert with Oregon

Entering his true freshman season listed as QB2 on the depth chart behind Dakota Prukop, Herbert became the first true freshman at Oregon to start at quarterback since Chris Miller in 1983 when the Ducks took on their arch-rivals, the Washington Huskies, on October 8, 2016. Despite Herbert setting or equaling Oregon's single-game records for total offensive yards (512), passing yards (489), and touchdown passes (6), the Ducks finished with their worst season in 25 years, going 4–8 and failing to make a bowl game for the first time in over a decade.

After the fifth game of the season, Herbert became the starting quarterback. He showcased his talents by throwing for 1,936 yards including 19 touchdowns with just four interceptions in eight starts. He led a come-from-behind upset when playing the ranked No. 11 Utah Utes. The team scored four touchdowns in the final 15:27 of the game to overcome a 14–3 deficit. On the final drive, Herbert completed 6-of-9 passes for 63 yards, including a 17-yard game-winning touchdown pass with two seconds left.

=== 2017 season ===
The Ducks entered the 2017 season with new head coach Willie Taggart. Leading the Ducks to a 4–1 start, Herbert's transition from the Chip Kelly/Mark Helfrich-era's "Blur Offense" to Taggart's "Gulf Coast Offense" was successful, before he fractured his collarbone against the California Golden Bears on September 30, 2017.

Without Herbert in the lineup, the Ducks dropped four of their next five games, and the offense went from averaging 49.2 points per game to just 15.0 points per game. Herbert returned to help the Ducks win their last two regular season games to become bowl eligible. The Ducks were selected to play the Boise State Broncos in the Las Vegas Bowl but their performance fell flat and the Ducks lost 38–28 after Taggart left the team to become the head coach at Florida State a week before their bowl game.

In eight starts, Herbert had a 6–2 record and threw for 1,983 yards on 139-of-206 passing attempts (67.5%), including 15 touchdowns against only five interceptions. He also rushed the ball 44 times for 183 yards and five touchdowns. Herbert was named first-team CoSIDA Academic All-American with a 4.08 grade-point average in biology.

=== 2018 season ===
Herbert entered his third collegiate season as an early Heisman Trophy candidate despite being coached by a third different head coach. He also learned a third different offensive scheme with new head coach Mario Cristobal, transitioning from the spread offense to the pistol offense. Herbert led the Ducks to a 9–4 record and a victory in the Redbox Bowl. He finished the year with 3,151 passing yards, 29 passing touchdowns, and two rushing touchdowns. His 31 total touchdowns were good for second in the Pac-12 Conference behind Gardner Minshew of the Washington State Cougars. He was named to the Pac-12 All-Academic first-team.

=== 2019 season ===
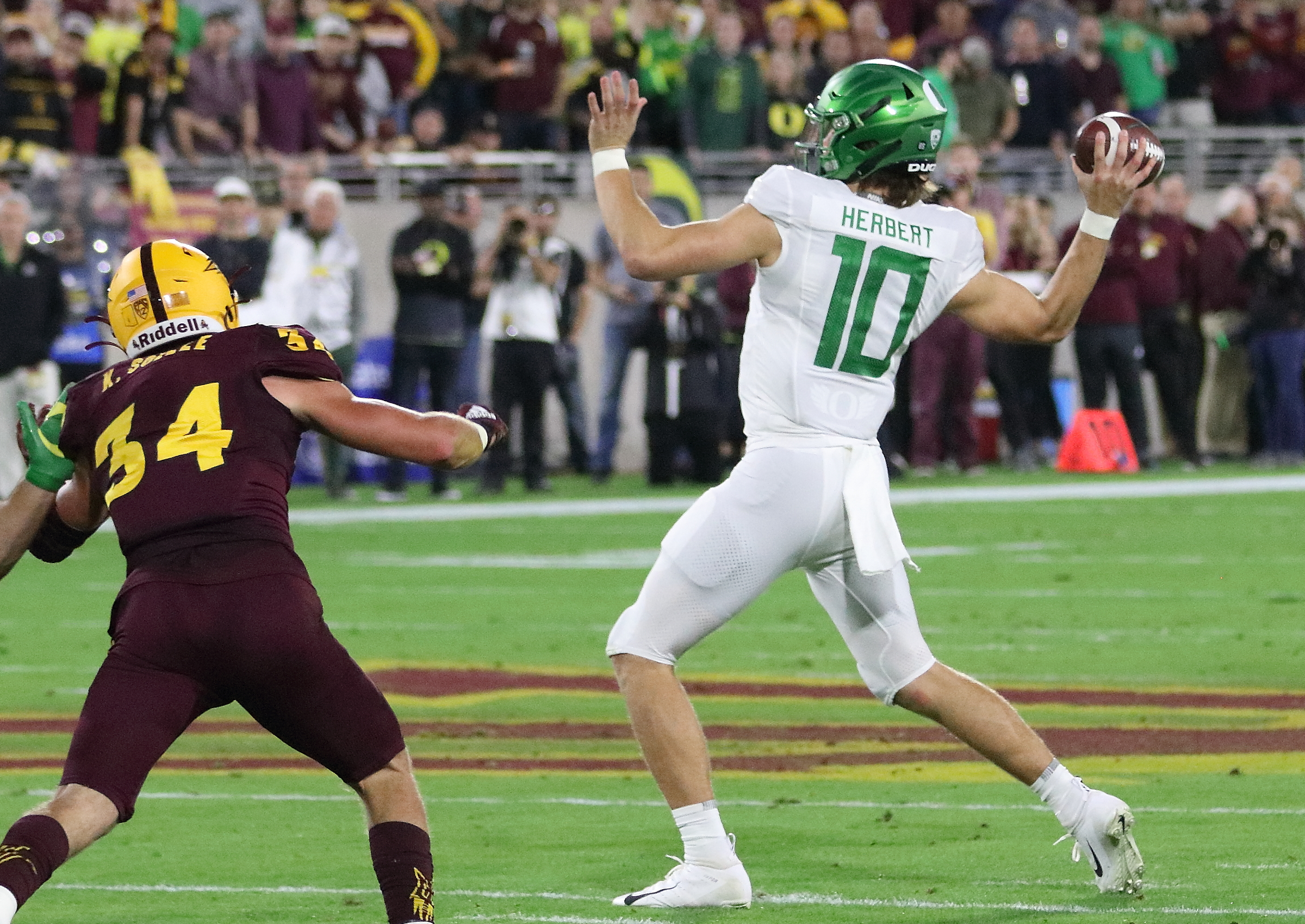
Herbert (right) in a game against the Arizona State Sun Devils in 2019

Despite projecting as a high draft pick, Herbert announced that he would return to Oregon for his senior season. He led the Ducks to a 12–2 record, including a win in the Rose Bowl where he ran for three touchdowns and was named Offensive MVP. In his best statistical collegiate season, Herbert totaled 3,471 passing yards, 32 passing touchdowns, and four rushing touchdowns. In addition to his on-field success, Herbert was named the 30th recipient of the William V. Campbell Trophy, which recognizes excellence in academics, athletics, and leadership, and is also referred to as the "Academic Heisman". He graduated from Oregon with a bachelor's degree in general science.

== Professional career ==
Pre-draft measurables
Height	Weight	Arm length	Hand span	Wingspan	40-yard dash	10-yard split	20-yard split	20-yard shuttle	Three-cone drill	Vertical jump	Broad jump	Wonderlic
6 ft 6 1/4 in (1.99 m)	236 lb (107 kg)	32 7/8 in (0.84 m)	10 in (0.25 m)	6 ft 6 7/8 in (2.00 m)	4.68 s	1.56 s	2.75 s	4.46 s	7.06 s	36.0 in (0.91 m)	10 ft 3 in (3.12 m)	39
All values from NFL Combine

=== 2020 ===
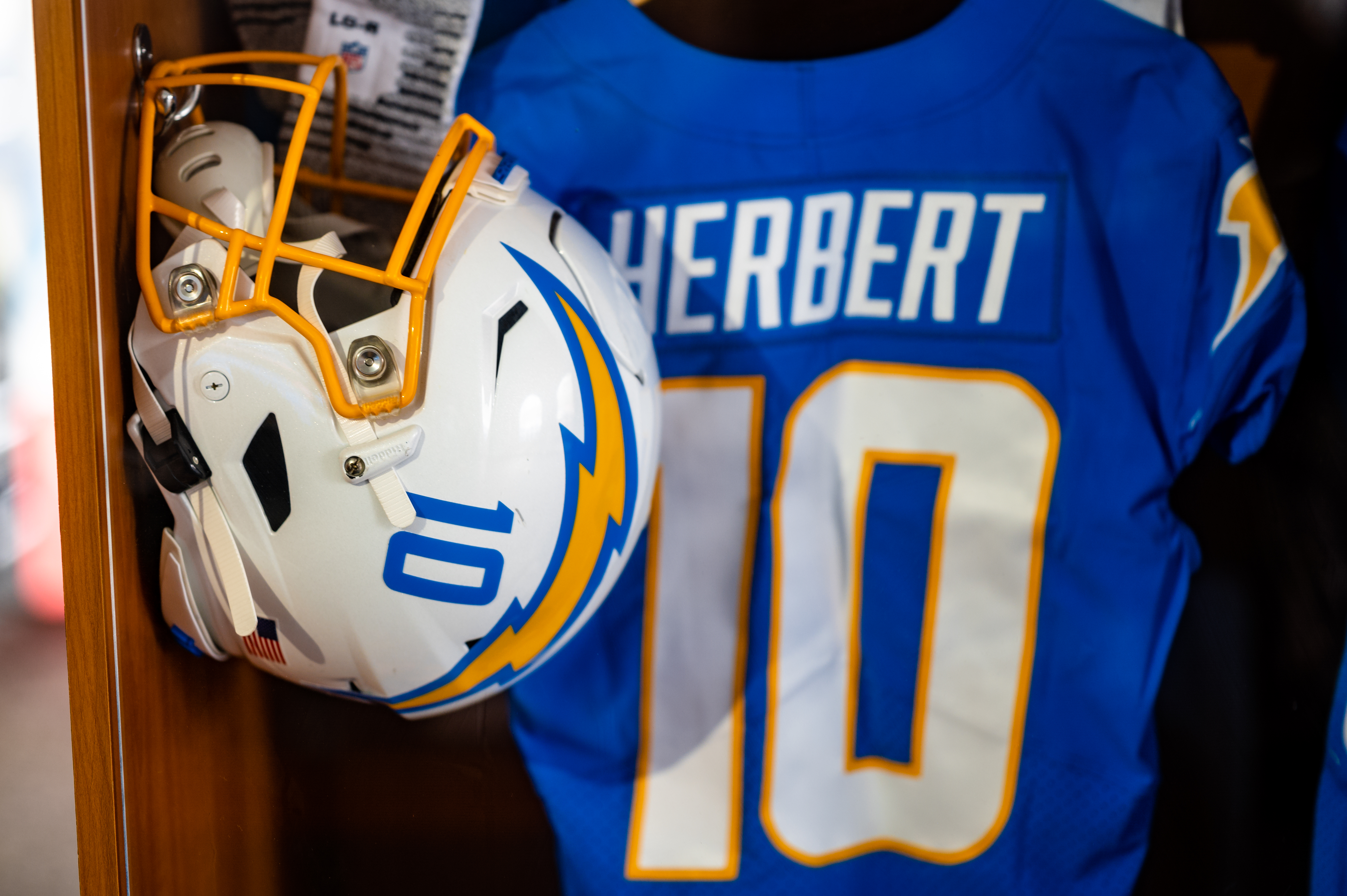
Herbert's locker at SoFi Stadium

Herbert was selected sixth overall by the Los Angeles Chargers in the first round of the 2020 NFL draft. He was the third quarterback taken, behind Joe Burrow and Tua Tagovailoa. On July 25, 2020, Herbert signed his four-year rookie contract, worth a fully guaranteed $26.6 million. Herbert's jersey was listed as the 12th best selling jersey to start the season. Herbert was named the backup quarterback behind starter Tyrod Taylor ahead of Week 1.

On September 20, 2020, Herbert made his first NFL start in Week 2 against the Kansas City Chiefs, replacing Taylor, who was ruled inactive after the team's doctor accidentally punctured his lung. He finished with 311 passing yards, one touchdown, one interception, and one rushing score as the Chargers lost 23–20 in overtime. He became only the third player in NFL history to pass for at least 300 yards and rush for a touchdown in his first career game. During Week 4 against the Tampa Bay Buccaneers, Herbert completed 20 passes out of 25 attempts for 290 yards, three touchdowns, and an interception as the Chargers lost 38–31. On October 8, 2020, Herbert was named the starting quarterback for the Chargers over Taylor going forward.

In Week 5 against the New Orleans Saints on Monday Night Football, Herbert threw for 264 yards and four touchdowns during the 30–27 overtime loss. He became the first rookie in NFL history to throw for four touchdown passes on Monday Night Football. Herbert was named Offensive Rookie of the Month after throwing 10 touchdowns to one interception in three starts with 901 passing yards and a 122.2 passer rating. He also became the first rookie quarterback in NFL history with multiple touchdowns in seven consecutive games. Herbert was named the Offensive Rookie of the Month for his performance in November.

On December 27, 2020, Herbert threw his 28th passing touchdown of the season against the Denver Broncos, breaking the NFL record for most passing touchdowns by a rookie (previously held by Baker Mayfield) during the 19–16 win. During the game, he also reached 4,000 yards passing for the season, becoming only the fourth rookie quarterback to achieve the feat. He was named Rookie of the Year and Offensive Rookie of the Year by the Pro Football Writers of America. Herbert finished the 2020 season on a four-game winning streak with 4,336 yards passing, 31 touchdowns, and 10 interceptions. He was named to the NFL All-Rookie Team. He was ranked 56th by his fellow players on the NFL Top 100 Players of 2021.

=== 2021 ===
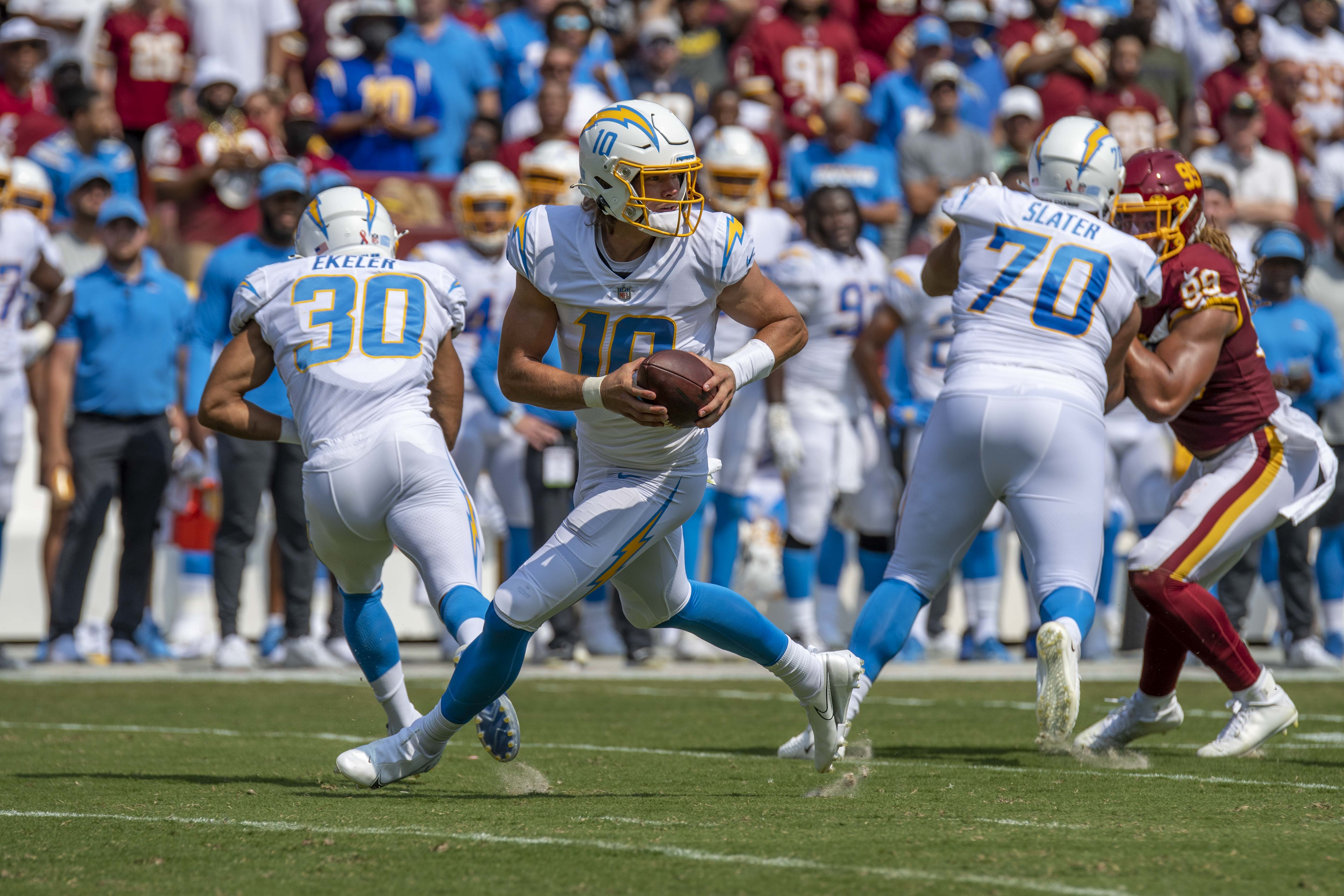
Herbert in a game against the Washington Football Team, 2021

Herbert helped lead the Chargers to a 4–1 start, including a Week 3 30–24 victory over the Kansas City Chiefs. In Week 5, against the Cleveland Browns, Herbert had his best statistical game of the season. He had 398 passing yards, four passing touchdowns, and a rushing touchdown in a 47–42 shootout victory. In Week 9, Herbert had three total touchdowns while completing 32-of-38 passes for 356 yards, two touchdowns, a rushing touchdown, and no interceptions in a 27–24 win over the Philadelphia Eagles, earning American Football Conference (AFC) Offensive Player of the Week honors. Against the Pittsburgh Steelers on Week 11, Herbert had 382 passing yards, three touchdowns, and an interception in a 41–37 win.

In a Week 13 matchup against the Cincinnati Bengals, Herbert had 317 passing yards, three passing touchdowns, and an interception in a 41–22 victory, earning him his second AFC Offensive Player of the Week berth of the season. He followed that performance with 275 passing yards, three passing touchdowns, and no interceptions in Week 14 against the New York Giants, lifting the Chargers to a 37–21 victory, and an 8–5 record. He earned his second consecutive, and third overall, AFC Offensive Player of the Week honor for his performance.

In Week 15, playing against the Chiefs, Herbert surpassed Andrew Luck's record for the most passing yards in an NFL quarterback's first two seasons. Additionally, he surpassed Dan Marino's record for the most total touchdowns in an NFL quarterback's first two seasons. In a Week 18 win or tie or go home situation against the Las Vegas Raiders, Herbert threw for 383 yards, three touchdowns, and an interception in the 35–32 overtime loss, eliminating the Chargers from the playoffs.

In the 2021 season, Herbert set franchise records with 5,014 passing yards, 38 passing touchdowns, and 15 interceptions. In addition, he had 63 carries for 302 rushing yards and three rushing touchdowns, leading the Chargers to a 9–8 record and his first career Pro Bowl. Herbert became the first quarterback in franchise history to throw for at least 5,000 yards in a single season. He was ranked 40th by his fellow players on the NFL Top 100 Players of 2022.

=== 2022 ===
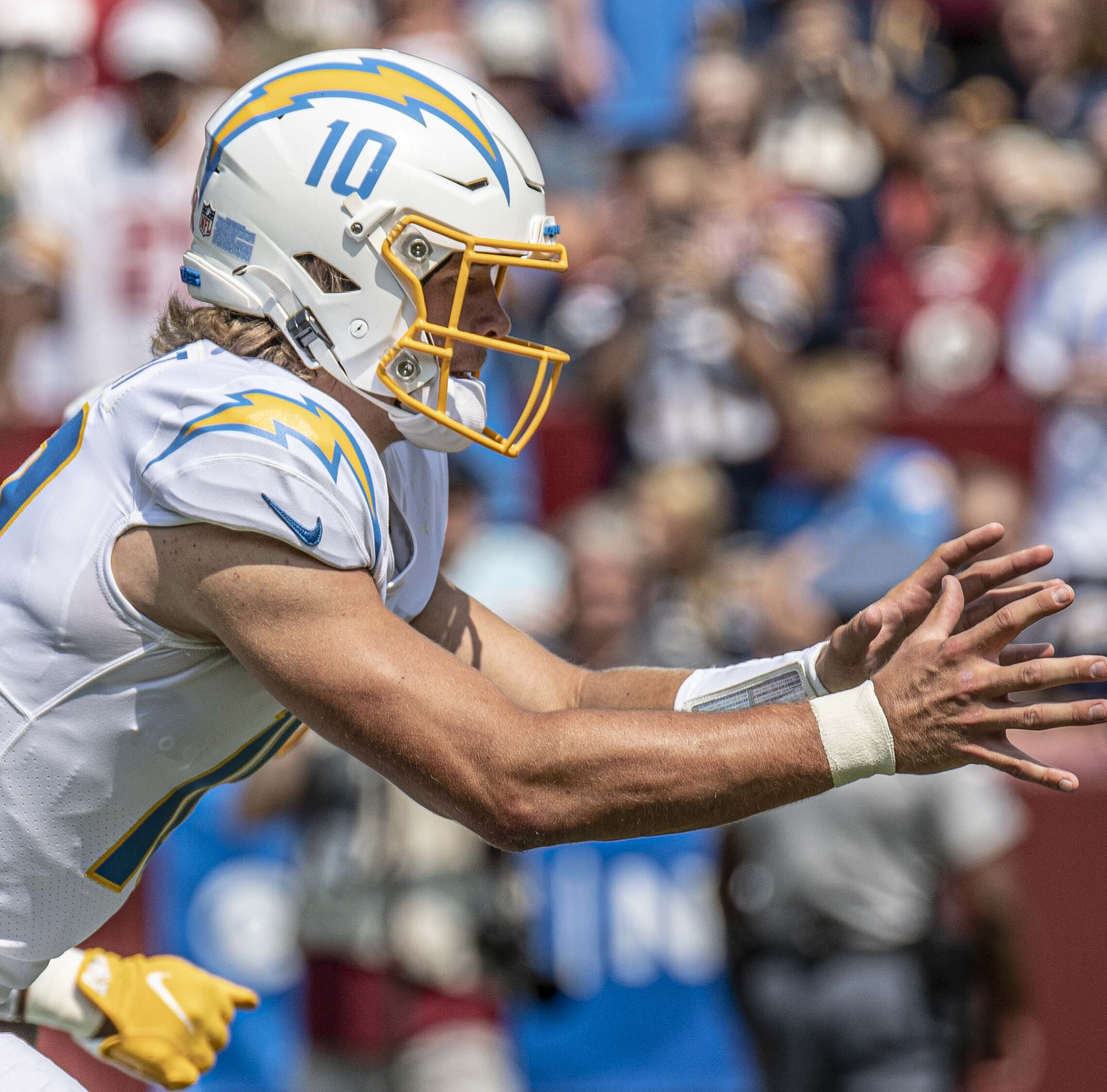
Herbert taking a snap in the shotgun

In Week 1 against the Las Vegas Raiders, Herbert threw for 279 yards and three touchdowns in the 24–19 win. In Week 2 against the Kansas City Chiefs, Herbert threw for 334 yards and three touchdowns for the second consecutive game. In the fourth quarter, Herbert suffered a fracture to his rib cartilage. Despite a late touchdown, the Chargers would go on to lose 27–24. In Week 6 against the Denver Broncos, Herbert completed 37 of 57 passes for 238 yards, no touchdowns, and an interception in the 19–16 victory. His 57 passes were the most in a winning effort without a passing touchdown in NFL history. Overall, Herbert passed for 4,739 yards, 25 touchdowns, and ten interceptions in 17 games in the 2022 season. He set single-season franchise records for pass attempts and completions. The Chargers finished with a 10–7 record and earned a playoff berth.

In his first playoff game, Herbert passed for 273 yards and a touchdown as the Chargers fell to the Jacksonville Jaguars 31–30 in the Wild Card Round. The Chargers surrendered a 27–0 lead for the third-largest blown lead in NFL playoff history.

After the season, he was ranked 32nd by his fellow players on the NFL Top 100 Players of 2023.

=== 2023 ===
On April 28, 2023, the Chargers picked up the fifth-year option on Herbert's contract. On July 25, he signed a five-year extension worth $262.5 million, which extends through the 2029 season. At the time of the signing, the deal made Herbert the highest-paid player in NFL history (surpassing the previous record set by Lamar Jackson just months earlier) and the highest-paid NFL quarterback based on average annual value at $52.5 million per season. However, this record deal would be surpassed by Joe Burrow's extension just two months later.

After starting the season 0–2, Herbert had a fourth-quarter comeback against the Minnesota Vikings in Week 3, resulting in a 28–24 win. This game also marked his first 400-yard passing performance in the NFL. In Week 14 against the Denver Broncos, Herbert suffered a broken index finger on his throwing hand in the second quarter and was ruled out for the remainder of the game. On December 12, the Chargers announced Herbert would undergo surgery and was placed on injured reserve, ending his season. He was ranked 75 by his fellow players on the NFL Top 100 Players of 2024.

=== 2024 ===
Herbert entered his fifth NFL season with his third different head coach, as Brandon Staley was replaced by Jim Harbaugh. Herbert began the season with a 90-plus passer rating in his first ten games, the longest streak of starts with a 90-plus passer rating by any quarterback to begin a season since 2018. In Week 10 against the Tennessee Titans, Herbert passed David Carr for the most completions by a quarterback in their first five seasons. From Weeks 2 to 14, Herbert recorded 357 consecutive pass attempts without an interception, the fifth-longest such streak in NFL history. In a 40–7 victory against the New England Patriots in Week 17, Herbert passed for 281 yards and three touchdowns to become the third player in NFL history with at least 3,000 passing yards and 20 touchdown passes in each of his first five seasons. The win also clinched a playoff berth for the Chargers, marking their second appearance in three seasons. He finished the regular season with 346 yards, two touchdowns, and no turnovers in a 34–20 win over the Raiders.

Herbert had an efficient year in his first season under Jim Harbaugh, finishing with 3,870 passing yards, 23 touchdowns, and just three interceptions, along with career highs in rushing yards. Herbert's 23:3 TD–INT ratio (7.67) ranks eighth all-time in NFL history among quarterbacks with at least 15 touchdown passes in a season. His numbers on play-action passes were among the best in the league, completing 74.7 percent for 1,617 yards with eight touchdowns and just two interceptions on such throws. Despite a productive regular season, Herbert had the worst game of his career in the Wild Card Round against the Houston Texans, posting a career-low 43.8% completion percentage, one touchdown, and a career-high four interceptions for a career-low passer rating of 40.9 as the Chargers lost 32–12. He was ranked 56th by his fellow players on the NFL Top 100 Players of 2025.

=== 2025 ===
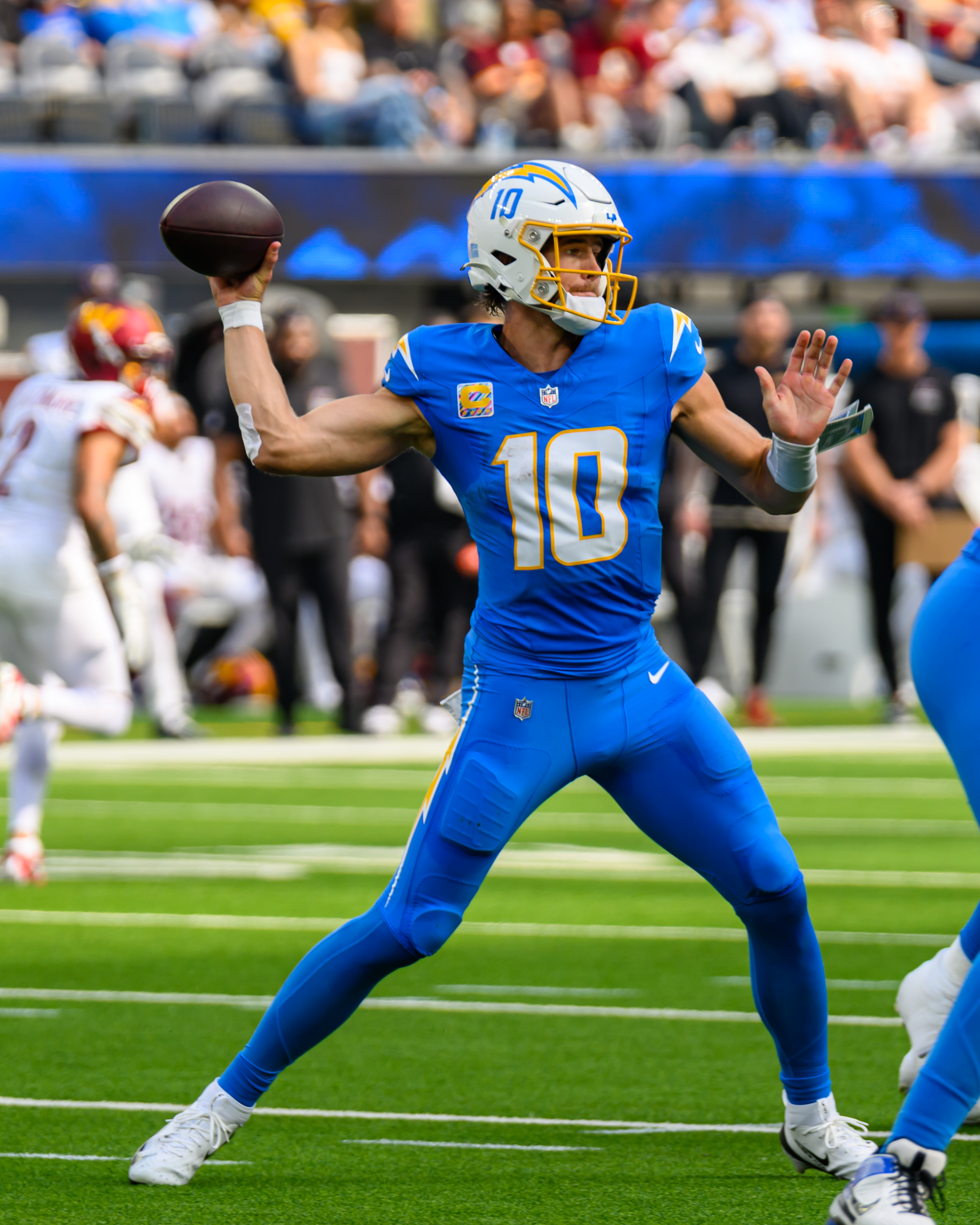
Herbert in 2025 passing the ball

Herbert and the Chargers opened the 2025 season playing in São Paulo, Brazil, against the Kansas City Chiefs. They won 27–21 with Herbert completing 25 out of 34 passes for 318 passing yards and 3 passing touchdowns. In Week 8 against the Minnesota Vikings, Herbert passed Peyton Manning for the most completions by a quarterback in their first six seasons. On December 1, he underwent surgery to repair a fracture in his left hand, which he suffered in Week 14 against the Philadelphia Eagles. On December 23, Herbert was named to his second career Pro Bowl. Playing behind an offensive line that lost starters Joe Alt and Rashawn Slater to season-ending injuries, Herbert led the team to 11 wins while being pressured on a league-high 288 dropbacks. He ran for a career-high 498 yards. The Chargers lost their playoff opener 16–3 to the Patriots. "I didn't play well enough and didn't make any plays," Herbert said. He completed 19 of 31 passes for 159 yards with no touchdowns, was sacked six times, and lost a fumble, while leading the Chargers in rushing with 55 yards. He was ranked 39th by his fellow players on the NFL Top 100 Players of 2026.

=== 2026 ===
The Chargers hired Mike McDaniel during the offseason as their offensive coordinator. During training camp, McDaniel worked with Herbert to change his mechanics regarding footwork and anticipatory throwing.

Herbert and the Chargers struggled significantly through the first half of the regular season, losing their first eight games. They opened the year being upset by the Arizona Cardinals 26−14, with Herbert leading a scoring drive on the first series before his team fell behind. During Los Angeles' 0–8 start, the offense ranked last in the NFL with 15.1 points per game while Herbert was sacked 31 times with just six touchdowns against a league-leading 11 interceptions. He also threw at least one interception in all eight games, the longest stretch to start a season since Peyton Manning did so in the first nine games in 2015. In the eighth game, a 44–22 loss to the Houston Texans, he was sacked eight times—the most by a Chargers quarterback since Dan Fouts in 1976—before leaving with a finger injury. Analysts attributed his poor performance to his increasing tendency to play "hero ball" by forcing throws and misreading the defense, along with factors like limited production by the running backs, injuries to his receivers and offensive line, and a disconnect between him and McDaniel.

The Chargers snapped their losing streak in Week 10, beating the Baltimore Ravens 23–20. Herbert ran for a 22-yard touchdown and avoided throwing an interception for the first time in 2026.

== Career statistics ==
=== NFL ===
Legend
	Led the league
**Bold**	Career best

==== Regular season ====
Year	Team	Games			Passing												Rushing					Sacks		Fumbles	
Year	Team	GP	GS	Record	Cmp	Att	Pct	Yds	Y/A	Y/G	Lng	TD	Int	TD%	Int%	Rtg	Att	Yds	Y/A	Lng	TD	Sck	SckY	Fum	Lost
2020	LAC	15	15	6–9	396	595	66.6	4,336	7.3	289.1	**72**	31	10	5.2	1.7	98.3	55	234	4.3	31	**5**	32	218	**8**	1
2021	LAC	17	17	9–8	443	672	65.9	**5,014**	7.5	**294.9**	**72**	**38**	**15**	**5.7**	2.2	97.7	63	302	4.8	36	3	31	214	1	1
2022	LAC	17	17	10–7	**477**	**699**	**68.2**	4,739	6.8	278.8	55	25	10	3.6	1.4	93.2	54	147	2.7	23	0	38	206	**8**	**3**
2023	LAC	13	13	5–8	297	456	65.1	3,134	6.9	241.1	60	20	7	4.4	1.5	93.2	52	228	4.4	35	3	29	233	4	1
2024	LAC	17	17	11–6	332	504	65.9	3,870	**7.7**	227.6	66	23	3	4.6	0.6	**101.7**	69	306	4.4	**41**	2	41	244	6	2
2025	LAC	16	16	**11–5**	340	512	66.4	3,727	7.3	232.9	60	26	13	5.1	2.5	94.1	**83**	**498**	**6.0**	**41**	2	**54**	**301**	7	2
2026	LAC	9	9	1–8	156	253	61.7	1,720	6.8	191.1	58	6	11	2.6	**4.7**	71.6	41	241	5.9	26	1	33	200	7	0
Career		104	104	53–51	2,441	3,691	66.1	26,540	7.2	255.2	72	169	69	4.6	1.9	94.6	417	1,956	4.7	41	16	258	1,616	41	10

==== Postseason ====
Year	Team	Games			Passing									Rushing					Sacks		Fumbles	
Year	Team	GP	GS	Record	Cmp	Att	Pct	Yds	Avg	Lng	TD	Int	Rtg	Att	Yds	Avg	Lng	TD	Sck	SckY	Fum	Lost
2022	LAC	1	1	0–1	**25**	**43**	58.1	**273**	6.3	25	**1**	0	**84.7**	3	12	4.0	13	0	3	20	1	0
2024	LAC	1	1	0–1	14	32	43.8	242	**7.6**	**86**	**1**	**4**	40.9	0	0	0.0	0	0	4	31	0	0
2025	LAC	1	1	0–1	19	31	**61.3**	159	5.1	20	0	0	74.5	**10**	**57**	**5.7**	**16**	0	**6**	**39**	**2**	**1**
Career		3	3	0–3	58	106	54.7	674	6.4	86	2	4	64.7	13	69	5.3	16	0	13	90	3	1

=== College ===
Season	Team	Games			Passing									Rushing			
Season	Team	GP	GS	Record	Cmp	Att	Pct	Yds	Avg	TD	Int	Rtg	QBR	Att	Yds	Avg	TD
2016	Oregon	9	7	2–5	162	255	63.5	1,936	7.6	19	4	148.8	73.9	58	161	2.8	2
2017	Oregon	8	8	6–2	139	206	67.5	1,983	9.6	15	5	167.5	80.1	44	183	4.2	5
2018	Oregon	13	13	9–4	240	404	59.4	3,151	7.8	29	8	144.6	76.4	71	166	2.3	2
2019	Oregon	14	14	12–2	286	428	66.8	3,471	8.1	32	6	156.8	74.7	58	50	0.9	4
Career		44	42	29–13	827	1,293	64.0	10,541	8.2	95	23	153.1	75.0	231	560	2.4	13

== Career highlights ==
=== Awards and honors ===
==== NFL ====
- NFL Offensive Rookie of the Year (2020)
- 2× Pro Bowl (2021, 2025)
- Pro Bowl Offensive MVP (2021)
- PFWA All-Rookie Team (2020)
- 7× AFC Offensive Player of the Week (2020: Week 11; 2021: Week 3, 5, 9, 11, 13, 14)
- 6× NFL Top 100 — 56th (2021), 40th (2022), 32nd (2023), 75th (2024), 56th (2025), 39st (2026)

==== College ====
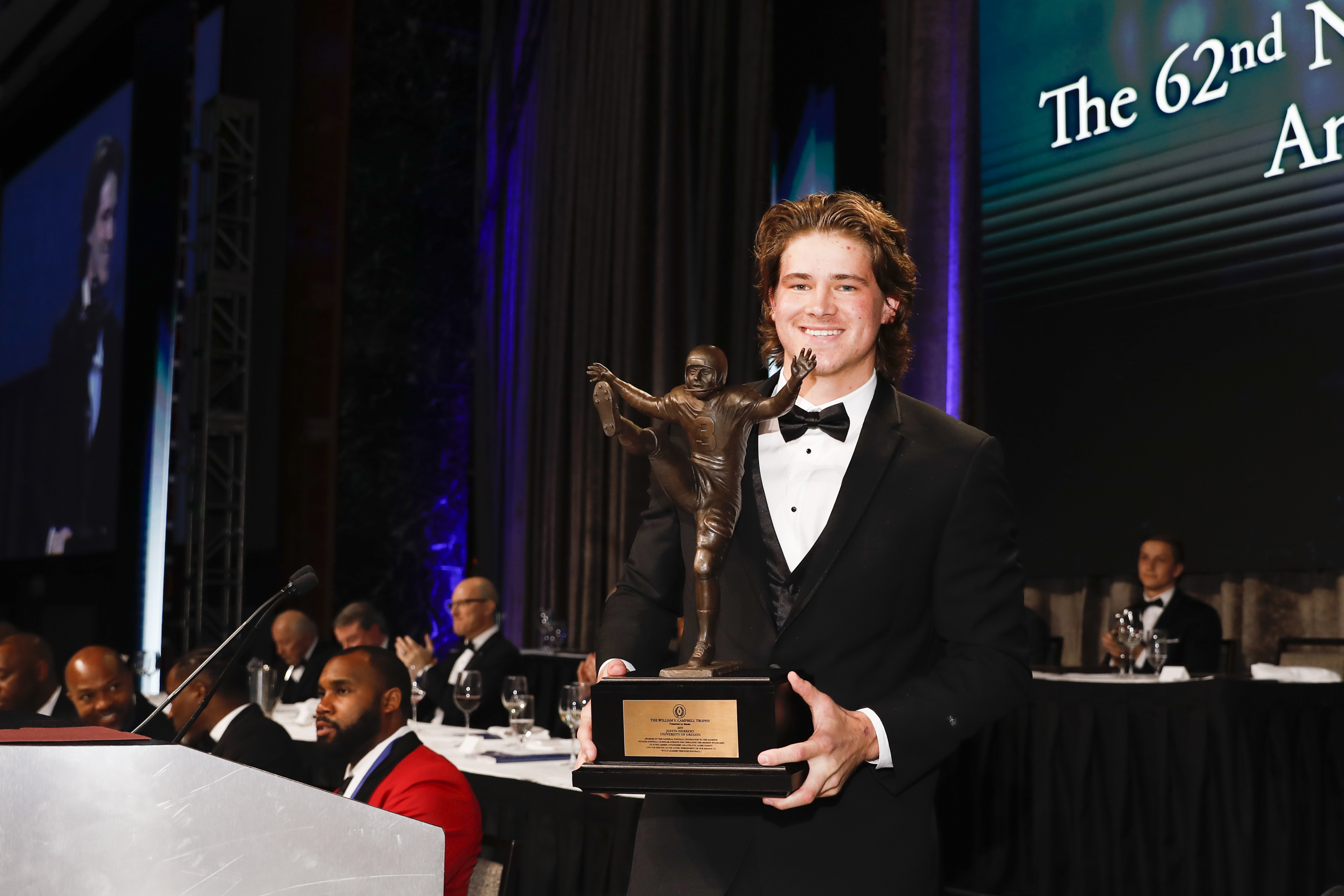
Herbert won the William V. Campbell Trophy in 2019.

2016

- Pac-12 Offensive Player of the Week (Pac-12 Coaches) – October 31, 2016
- Manning Award Quarterback of the Week – November 3, 2016
- Len Casanova Award (Oregon Team Award – Best First Year Player)

2017

- Pac-12 Academic All-Conference 1st Team
- Academic All American 1st Team
- Offensive Team MVP (Oregon Team Award)

2018

- Google Cloud Academic All America 1st Team Member of the Year
- Pac-12 All-Academic 1st team
- Skeie's Award (Oregon Team Award – Most Valuable Player)

2019

- Academic All American 1st Team
- Pac-12 Offensive Player of the Week (Pac-12 Coaches) – October 21, 2019
- William V. Campbell Trophy
- 2020 Rose Bowl Offensive MVP

=== NFL records ===
- Most passing yards in a quarterback's first two seasons (9,350)
- Most passing yards in a quarterback's first three seasons (14,089)
- Most passing yards in a quarterback's first four seasons (17,223)
- Most passing yards in a quarterback's first five seasons (21,093)
- Most completions in a quarterback's first five seasons (1,945)
- Most passing touchdowns by a rookie quarterback (31)
- Most total touchdowns by a rookie quarterback (36)
- Most 300-yard passing games by a rookie quarterback (8)
- Most completions by a rookie quarterback (396)
- Most games with at least 3 touchdown passes by a rookie (6)
- Most total touchdowns in a quarterback's first two seasons (77)
- First quarterback to record 30 touchdown passes in each of his first two seasons
- Most completions in first 50 NFL games: (1,316)
- Most consecutive seasons of 4000 passing yards to begin a career: 3

== Personal life ==
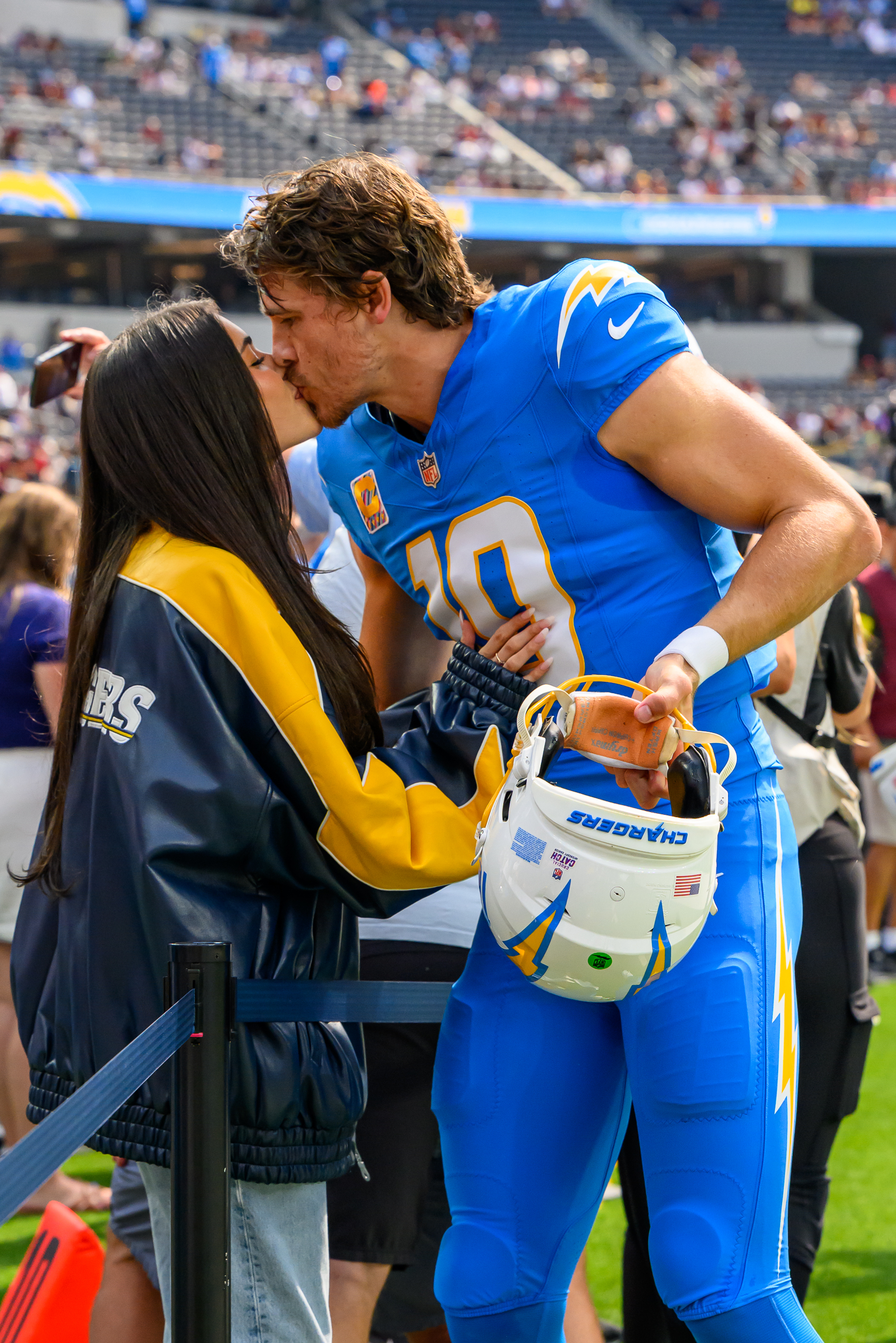
Herbert with fiancée and singer-songwriter Madison Beer, 2025

Herbert's maternal grandfather, Rich Schwab, played receiver at the University of Oregon in the 1960s. His paternal grandfather, Roger Herbert, was a biology teacher at Sheldon High School and fueled Herbert’s interest in science. His father, Mark Herbert, played football and ran track at the University of Montana. Herbert was a San Diego Chargers fan growing up. Herbert's younger brother, Patrick, currently plays tight end (also on the Chargers). His older brother, Mitchell, played wide receiver at Montana State University. Herbert has been in a relationship with singer-songwriter Madison Beer since 2025. They announced their engagement on July 28, 2026.

=== Chess ===
Herbert, after being beaten by Chargers teammate Rashawn Slater in chess during a road trip in 2024 to play the Carolina Panthers, decided to improve his play of the game over the next year, studying chess from various sources. He appeared with Swedish chess player, Woman FIDE Master and internet chess celebrity Anna Cramling in a video in 2025 to talk about his journey to improve his chess game.
