= 2024 Los Angeles Chargers season =

65th season in franchise history

- Owner: Dean Spanos
- General manager: Joe Hortiz
- Head coach: Jim Harbaugh
- Offensive coordinator: Greg Roman
- Defensive coordinator: Jesse Minter
- Home stadium: SoFi Stadium

Results
- Record: 11–6
- Division place: 2nd AFC West
- Playoffs: Lost Wild Card Playoffs (at Texans) 12–32
- All-Pros: CB Derwin James (2nd team)
- Pro Bowlers: OLB Khalil Mack; OLB Joey Bosa; SS Derwin James; LT Rashawn Slater

Uniform
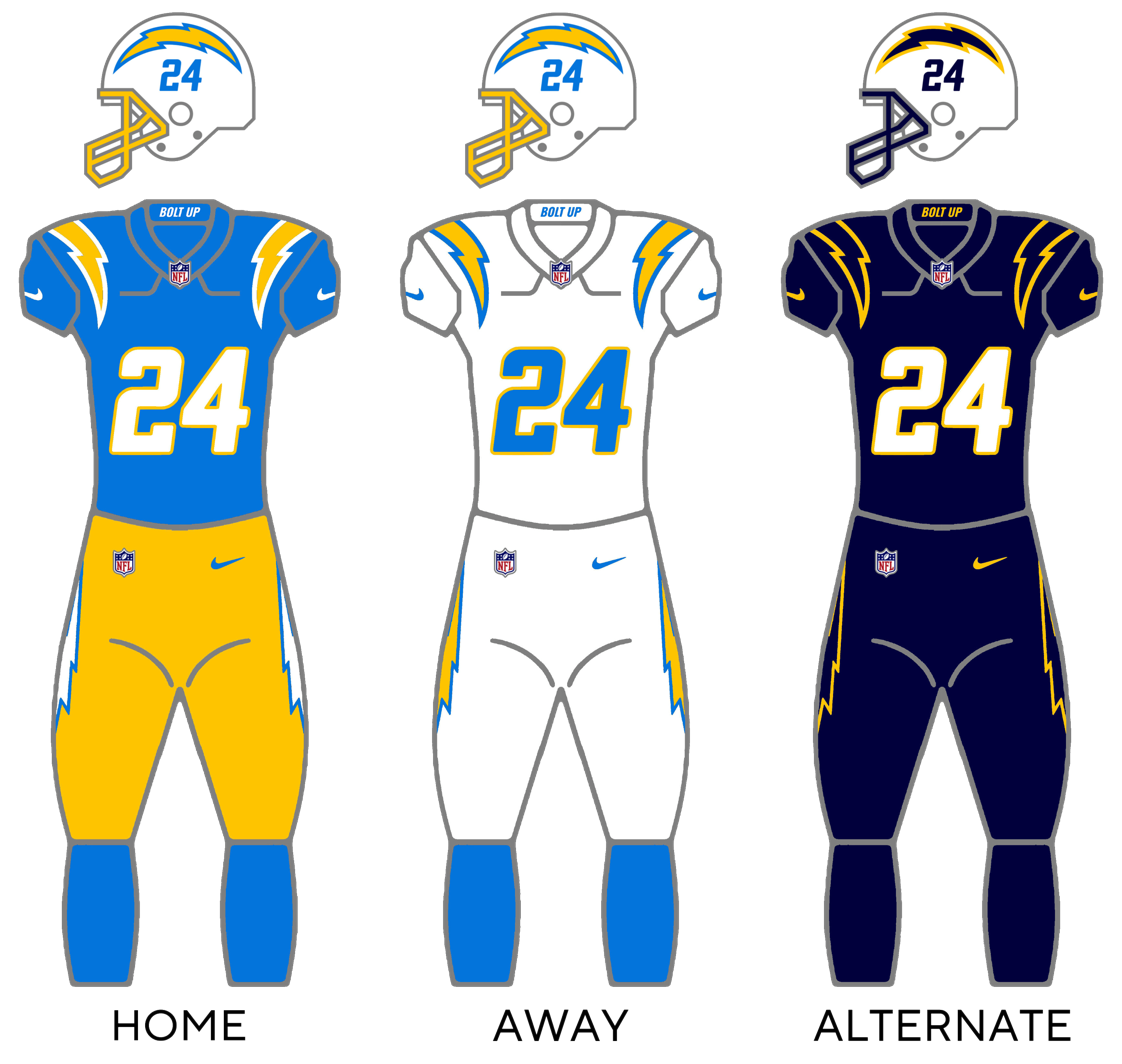

The 2024 season was the Los Angeles Chargers' 55th in the National Football League (NFL), their 65th overall, their ninth in the Greater Los Angeles Area, their fifth playing their home games at SoFi Stadium, and their first under head coach Jim Harbaugh and new general manager Joe Hortiz. The Chargers improved on their 5–12 record from 2023 following a Week 10 victory against the Tennessee Titans. With a win over the New England Patriots in Week 17, the Chargers clinched a wild card spot, returning to the playoffs after a one-year absence, but lost to the Texans by a score of 32–12 in the Wild Card round. The Chargers' strong defense finished the season with only 301 points allowed, the fewest in the league. Their .647 winning percentage was their best since 2018.

This is the first season since 2012 without wide receiver Keenan Allen on the roster, as he was traded to the Chicago Bears on March 14. This made Joey Bosa and Denzel Perryman the last players that were on the Chargers during their time in San Diego. However, Allen returned to the Chargers for the following season.

== Draft ==
2024 Los Angeles Chargers draft selections
Round	Selection	Player	Position	College	Notes
1	5	Joe Alt	OT	Notre Dame	
2	34	Ladd McConkey	WR	Georgia	From Patriots (Note: The Chargers traded second- and fourth-round selections (37th and 110th overall) to the New England Patriots in exchange for second- and fifth-round selections (34th and 137th overall).)
2	37	Traded to the New England Patriots			
3	69	Junior Colson	LB	Michigan	
4	105	Justin Eboigbe	DT	Alabama	
4	110	Traded to the New England Patriots			From Bears (Note: The Los Angeles Chargers traded WR Keenan Allen to the Chicago Bears in exchange for a fourth-round selection (110th overall).)
5	137	Tarheeb Still	CB	Maryland	From Patriots
5	140	Cam Hart	CB	Notre Dame	
6	181	Kimani Vidal	RB	Troy	
7	225	Brenden Rice	WR	USC	
7	253	Cornelius Johnson	WR	Michigan	Compensatory selection

2024 Los Angeles Chargers undrafted free agents
Name	Position	College	Ref.
Karsen Barnhart	G	Michigan	
Casey Bauman	QB	Augustana (SD)	
Luke Benson	TE	Georgia Tech	
Akeem Dent	S	Florida State	
Jaelen Gill	WR	Fresno State	
Thomas Harper	S	Notre Dame	
Zach Heins	TE	South Dakota State	
Savion Jackson	OLB	NC State	
Jeremiah Jean-Baptiste	LB	Ole Miss	
Leon Johnson	WR	Oklahoma State	
Jaylen Johnson	WR	East Carolina	
Robert Kennedy	CB	NC State	
Shane Lee	LB	USC	
Michael Mason	DE	Coastal Carolina	
Tre'Mon Morris-Brash	OLB	UCF	
Tyler McLellan	OT	Campbell	
Willis Patrick	G	TCU	
Jalyn Phillips	S	Clemson	
Tyler Smith	OT	Western Carolina	
Zamari Walton	CB	Ole Miss	
Bucky Williams	G	Appalachian State	
Chris Collins	OLB	Minnesota	

Draft trades

== Staff ==
2024 Los Angeles Chargers staff
Front office: Chairman/owner/president – Dean Spanos; Vice chairman – Michael Spanos; Executive vice president/COO/CFO – Jeanne Bonk; CEO/president of business operations – A. G. Spanos; General manager – Joe Hortiz; Assistant general manager – Chad Alexander; President of football operations – John Spanos; Executive vice president of football administration/player finance – Ed McGuire; Director of player personnel strategy – Corey Krawiec; Director of pro scouting – Dennis Abraham; Senior director of pro personnel – Louis Clark; Senior director of college scouting – Kevin Kelly; Assistant director of pro scouting – Tyler Lyon; Head coaches: Head coach – Jim Harbaugh; Offensive coaches: Offensive coordinator – Greg Roman; Passing game coordinator – Marcus Brady; Quarterbacks – Shane Day; Running backs – Kiel McDonald; Wide receivers – Sanjay Lal; Tight ends/run game coordinator – Andy Bischoff; Offensive line – Mike Devlin; Assistant offensive line – Nick Hardwick; Senior offensive assistant – Marc Trestman; Offensive assistant – Phil Serchia; Offensive assistant/quarterbacks – Jonathan Goodwin; Offensive quality control/wide receivers – Jeff Carpenter	Defensive coaches: Defensive coordinator – Jesse Minter; Defensive line – Mike Elston; Assistant defensive line – Will Tukuafu; Linebackers – NaVorro Bowman; Defensive backs – Steve Clinkscale; Safeties – Chris O'Leary; Senior defensive analyst – Rick Minter; Defensive assistant – Dylan Roney; Defensive assistant – Mike Hiestand; Defensive quality control – Robert Muschamp; Special teams coaches: Special teams coordinator – Ryan Ficken; Assistant special teams – Chris Gould; Strength and conditioning: Executive director of player performance – Ben Herbert; Head of strength and conditioning – Jonathan Brooks; Head of strength and conditioning – Devin Woodhouse; Director of performance analytics – Ben Rabe; Performance analyst – Lincoln Dewolf

== Final roster ==
2024 Los Angeles Chargers roster
Quarterbacks (QB): 8 Taylor Heinicke; 10 Justin Herbert; 2 Easton Stick; Running backs (RB): 27 J. K. Dobbins; 4 Gus Edwards; 28 Hassan Haskins; 44 Scott Matlock FB; 30 Kimani Vidal; Wide receivers (WR): 9 D. J. Chark; 12 Derius Davis; 87 Simi Fehoko; 1 Quentin Johnston; 15 Ladd McConkey; 5 Josh Palmer; Tight ends (TE): 81 Will Dissly; 42 Tucker Fisk; 88 Hayden Hurst; 84 Stone Smartt	Offensive linemen (OL): 76 Joe Alt RT; 75 Bradley Bozeman C; 64 Brenden Jaimes C; 77 Zion Johnson LG; 62 Sam Mustipher C; 79 Trey Pipkins RG; 68 Jamaree Salyer RG; 73 Foster Sarell LT; 70 Rashawn Slater LT; Defensive linemen (DL): 92 Justin Eboigbe DE; 95 Poona Ford NT; 56 Morgan Fox DE; 93 Otito Ogbonnia NT; 90 Teair Tart NT	Linebackers (LB): 97 Joey Bosa OLB; 25 Junior Colson ILB; 48 Bud Dupree OLB; 43 Troy Dye ILB; 0 Daiyan Henley ILB; 52 Khalil Mack OLB; 31 Nick Niemann ILB; 6 Denzel Perryman ILB; 58 Shaq Quarterman ILB; 45 Tuli Tuipulotu OLB; Defensive backs (DB): 41 Eli Apple CB; 7 Kristian Fulton CB; 32 Alohi Gilman FS; 20 Cam Hart CB; 3 Derwin James SS; 23 Tony Jefferson FS; 33 Deane Leonard CB; 29 Tarheeb Still CB; Special teams (ST): 11 Cameron Dicker K; 47 Josh Harris LS; 16 J. K. Scott P	Practice squad: 61 Karsen Barnhart G; 35 Dicaprio Bootle CB; 46 McCallan Castles TE; 24 Ezekiel Elliott RB; 38 Terrell Edmunds S; 82 Dez Fitzpatrick WR; 91 Christopher Hinton NT; 49 Eddie Jackson FS; 51 Jeremiah Jean-Baptiste ILB; 39 Jaylen Johnson WR; 57 Tre'Mon Morris-Brash OLB; 50 Caleb Murphy OLB; 69 C. J. Okoye DE (IPP); 34 Jaret Patterson RB; 83 Eric Tomlinson TE; 37 Shaun Wade CB; 40 Kendall Williamson S; Reserve: 53 Chris Collins OLB (IR); 24 Marcus Maye FS (IR); 74 Tyler McLellan LT (IR); 22 Elijah Molden SS (IR); 89 Jalen Reagor WR (IR); 82 Brenden Rice WR (IR); 94 Chris Rumph II OLB (IR); 26 Asante Samuel Jr. CB (IR); 36 Ja'Sir Taylor CB (IR); 60 Bucky Williams C (IR); Rookies in italics 53 active, 13 reserve, 15 practice squad (1 exempt)

== Preseason ==
Week	Date	Opponent	Result	Record	Venue	Recap
1	August 10	Seattle Seahawks	L 3–16	0–1	SoFi Stadium	Recap
2	August 17	Los Angeles Rams	L 9–13	0–2	SoFi Stadium	Recap
3	August 24	at Dallas Cowboys	W 26–19	1–2	AT&T Stadium	Recap

== Regular season ==
=== Schedule ===
Week	Date	Opponent	Result	Record	Venue	Recap
1	September 8	**Las Vegas Raiders**	**W** 22–10	1–0	SoFi Stadium	Recap
2	September 15	at Carolina Panthers	**W** 26–3	2–0	Bank of America Stadium	Recap
3	September 22	at Pittsburgh Steelers	**L** 10–20	2–1	Acrisure Stadium	Recap
4	September 29	**Kansas City Chiefs**	**L** 10–17	2–2	SoFi Stadium	Recap
5	Bye					
6	October 13	at **Denver Broncos**	**W** 23–16	3–2	Empower Field at Mile High	Recap
7	October 21	at Arizona Cardinals	**L** 15–17	3–3	State Farm Stadium	Recap
8	October 27	New Orleans Saints	**W** 26–8	4–3	SoFi Stadium	Recap
9	November 3	at Cleveland Browns	**W** 27–10	5–3	Huntington Bank Field	Recap
10	November 10	Tennessee Titans	**W** 27–17	6–3	SoFi Stadium	Recap
11	November 17	Cincinnati Bengals	**W** 34–27	7–3	SoFi Stadium	Recap
12	November 25	Baltimore Ravens	**L** 23–30	7–4	SoFi Stadium	Recap
13	December 1	at Atlanta Falcons	**W** 17–13	8–4	Mercedes-Benz Stadium	Recap
14	December 8	at **Kansas City Chiefs**	**L** 17–19	8–5	Arrowhead Stadium	Recap
15	December 15	Tampa Bay Buccaneers	**L** 17–40	8–6	SoFi Stadium	Recap
16	December 19	**Denver Broncos**	**W** 34–27	9–6	SoFi Stadium	Recap
17	December 28	at New England Patriots	**W** 40–7	10–6	Gillette Stadium	Recap
18	January 5	at **Las Vegas Raiders**	**W** 34–20	11–6	Allegiant Stadium	Recap

Note: Intra-division opponents are in bold text.

=== Game summaries ===
==== Week 1: vs. Las Vegas Raiders ====
Week 1: Las Vegas Raiders at Los Angeles Chargers – Game summary

Quarter	1	2	3	4	Total
Raiders	7	0	0	3	**10**
**Chargers**	3	3	3	13	**22**

at SoFi Stadium, Inglewood, California

- Date: September 8
- Game time: 1:05 p.m. PDT
- Game weather: Sunny, 97 °F (36 °C) (fixed roof)
- Game attendance: 70,240
- Referee: Scott Novak
- TV announcers (CBS): Jim Nantz, Tony Romo and Tracy Wolfson
- Recap, Game Book

Game information

**First quarter**

- LAC – Cameron Dicker 53-yard field goal, 4:22. Chargers 3–0. **Drive: 4 plays, 5 yards, 1:33.**
- LV – Alexander Mattison 31-yard pass from Gardner Minshew (Daniel Carlson kick), 0:45. Raiders 7–3. **Drive: 7 plays, 67 yards, 3:37.**

**Second quarter**

- LAC – Cameron Dicker 25-yard field goal, 0:26. Raiders 7–6. **Drive: 4 plays, 5 yards, 0:47.**

**Third quarter**

- LAC – Cameron Dicker 24-yard field goal, 9:08. Chargers 9–7. **Drive: 9 plays, 74 yards, 3:45.**

**Fourth quarter**

- LAC – J. K. Dobbins 12-yard rush (Cameron Dicker kick), Chargers 16–7. **Drive: 6 plays, 61 yards, 2:07.**
- LV – Daniel Carlson 32-yard field goal, 10:30. Chargers 16–10. **Drive: 8 plays, 56 yards, 4:25.**
- LAC – Ladd McConkey 10-yard pass from Justin Herbert (run failed), 3:40. Chargers 22–10. **Drive: 8 plays, 92 yards, 3:29.**

**Top passers**

- LV – Gardner Minshew – 25/33, 257 yards, TD, INT
- LAC – Justin Herbert – 17/26, 144 yards, TD

**Top rushers**

- LV – Zamir White – 13 rushes, 44 yards
- LAC – J. K. Dobbins – 10 rushes, 135 yards, TD

**Top receivers**

- LV – Jakobi Meyers – 3 receptions, 61 yards
- LAC – Ladd McConkey – 5 receptions, 39 yards, TD

In Jim Harbaugh's debut as head coach, the Chargers avenged their 63–21 loss to the Raiders in Las Vegas the previous season and won their season opener.

==== Week 2: at Carolina Panthers ====
Week 2: Los Angeles Chargers at Carolina Panthers – Game summary

Quarter	1	2	3	4	Total
**Chargers**	6	14	3	3	**26**
Panthers	0	0	3	0	**3**

at Bank of America Stadium, Charlotte, North Carolina

- Date: September 15
- Game time: 1:00 p.m. EDT/10:00 a.m. PDT
- Game weather: Cloudy, 78 °F (26 °C)
- Game attendance: 70,145
- Referee: Brad Rogers
- TV announcers (CBS): Tom McCarthy, Jay Feely and Amanda Balionis
- Recap, Game Book

Game information

**First quarter**

- LAC – Quentin Johnston 29-yard pass from Justin Herbert (kick failed, wide left), 9:20. Chargers 6–0. **Drive: 9 plays, 67 yards, 5:40.**

**Second quarter**

- LAC – Quentin Johnston 5-yard pass from Justin Herbert (Cameron Dicker kick), 4:16. Chargers 13–0. **Drive: 11 plays, 65 yards, 6:01.**
- LAC – J. K. Dobbins 43-yard run (Cameron Dicker kick), 2:01. Chargers 20–0. **Drive: 3 plays, 52 yards, 1:26.**

**Third quarter**

- CAR – Eddy Piñeiro 38-yard field goal, 12:18. Chargers 20–3. **Drive: 6 plays, 40 yards, 2:42.**
- LAC – Cameron Dicker 46-yard field goal, 9:03. Chargers 23–3. **Drive: 6 plays, 37 yards, 3:15.**

**Fourth quarter**

- LAC – Cameron Dicker 42-yard field goal, 11:02. Chargers 26–3. **Drive: 10 plays, 52 yards, 4:00.**

**Top passers**

- LAC – Justin Herbert – 14/20, 130 yards, 2 TD, INT
- CAR – Bryce Young – 18/26, 84 yards, INT

**Top rushers**

- LAC – J. K. Dobbins – 17 rushes, 131 yards, TD
- CAR – Chuba Hubbard – 10 rushes, 64 yards

**Top receivers**

- LAC – Quentin Johnston – 5 receptions, 51 yards, TD
- CAR – Tommy Tremble – 3 receptions, 23 yards

The Chargers defeated the Panthers for the first time since 2004, which was also in Charlotte. The Chargers improved to 2–0.

==== Week 3: at Pittsburgh Steelers ====
Week 3: Los Angeles Chargers at Pittsburgh Steelers – Game summary

Quarter	1	2	3	4	Total
Chargers	7	3	0	0	**10**
**Steelers**	0	7	3	10	**20**

at Acrisure Stadium, Pittsburgh, Pennsylvania

- Date: September 22
- Game time: 1:00 p.m. EDT/10:00 a.m. PDT
- Game weather: Partly cloudy, 78 °F (26 °C)
- Game attendance: 66,734
- Referee: Alex Kemp
- TV announcers (CBS): Jim Nantz, Tony Romo and Tracy Wolfson
- Recap, Game Book

Game information

**First quarter**

- LAC – Quentin Johnston 27-yard pass from Justin Herbert (Cameron Dicker kick), 2:46. Chargers 7–0. **Drive: 5 plays, 59 yards, 2:48.**

**Second quarter**

- PIT – Justin Fields 5-yard run (Chris Boswell kick), 10:17. Tied 7–7. **Drive: 13 plays, 70 yards, 7:29.**
- LAC – Cameron Dicker 28-yard field goal, 3:13. Chargers 10–7. **Drive: 12 plays, 60 yards, 7:04.**

**Third quarter**

- PIT – Chris Boswell 38-yard field goal, 9:05. Tied 10–10. **Drive: 12 plays, 50 yards, 5:55.**

**Fourth quarter**

- PIT – Chris Boswell 30-yard field goal, 14:14. Steelers 13–10. **Drive: 12 plays, 73 yards, 6:26.**
- PIT – Calvin Austin 55-yard pass from Justin Fields (Chris Boswell kick), 7:02. Steelers 20–10. **Drive: 5 plays, 84 yards, 2:43.**

**Top passers**

- LAC – Justin Herbert – 12/18, 125 yards, TD
- PIT – Justin Fields – 25/32, 245 yards, TD, INT

**Top rushers**

- LAC – J. K. Dobbins – 15 rushes, 44 yards
- PIT – Najee Harris – 18 rushes, 70 yards

**Top receivers**

- LAC – Quentin Johnston – 2 receptions, 44 yards, TD
- PIT – Calvin Austin – 4 receptions, 95 yards, TD

The Chargers took a 10–7 lead to halftime, but were unable to hold off the Steelers in a 20–10 loss. The Chargers fell to 2–1 on the season.

==== Week 4: vs. Kansas City Chiefs ====
Week 4: Kansas City Chiefs at Los Angeles Chargers – Game summary

Quarter	1	2	3	4	Total
**Chiefs**	0	7	3	7	**17**
Chargers	10	0	0	0	**10**

at SoFi Stadium, Inglewood, California

- Date: September 29
- Game time: 1:25 p.m. PDT
- Game weather: Sunny, 68 °F (20 °C) (fixed roof)
- Game attendance: 70,240
- Referee: Shawn Smith
- TV announcers (CBS): Jim Nantz, Tony Romo and Tracy Wolfson
- Recap, Game Book

Game information

**First quarter**

- LAC – Ladd McConkey 7-yard pass from Justin Herbert (Cameron Dicker kick), 6:16. Chargers 7–0. **Drive: 10 plays, 74 yards, 6:36.**
- LAC – Cameron Dicker 50-yard field goal, 3:53. Chargers 10–0. **Drive: 4 plays, –12 yards, 2:13.**

**Second quarter**

- KC – Xavier Worthy 54-yard pass from Patrick Mahomes (Harrison Butker kick), 4:06. Chargers 10–7. **Drive: 1 play, 54 yards, 0:08.**

**Third quarter**

- KC – Harrison Butker 37-yard field goal, 6:26. Tied 10–10. **Drive: 10 plays, 37 yards, 5:20.**

**Fourth quarter**

- KC – Samaje Perine 2-yard run (Harrison Butker kick), 6:04. Chiefs 17–10. **Drive: 5 plays, 60 yards, 2:12.**

**Top passers**

- KC – Patrick Mahomes – 19/29, 245 yards, TD, INT
- LAC – Justin Herbert – 16/27, 179 yards, TD

**Top rushers**

- KC – Kareem Hunt – 14 rushes, 69 yards
- LAC – J. K. Dobbins – 14 rushes, 32 yards

**Top receivers**

- KC – Travis Kelce – 7 receptions, 89 yards
- LAC – Ladd McConkey – 5 receptions, 67 yards, TD

The Chargers allowed 17 straight points to the Chiefs after taking a 10–0 lead early in the game and fell to 2–2 on the season.

==== Week 6: at Denver Broncos ====
Week 6: Los Angeles Chargers at Denver Broncos – Game summary

Quarter	1	2	3	4	Total
**Chargers**	10	10	3	0	**23**
Broncos	0	0	0	16	**16**

at Empower Field at Mile High, Denver, Colorado

- Date: October 13
- Game time: 2:05 p.m. MDT/1:05 p.m. PDT
- Game weather: Partly cloudy, 65 °F (18 °C)
- Game attendance: 70,743
- Referee: Tra Blake
- TV announcers (CBS): Andrew Catalon, Tiki Barber, Jason McCourty and A. J. Ross
- Recap, Game Book

Game information

**First quarter**

- LAC – Cameron Dicker 20-yard field goal, 9:26. Chargers 3–0. **Drive: 9 plays, 29 yards, 4:11.**
- LAC – Kimani Vidal 38-yard pass from Justin Herbert (Cameron Dicker kick), 4:59. Chargers 10–0. **Drive: 6 plays, 83 yards, 2:53.**

**Second quarter**

- LAC – Cameron Dicker 33-yard field goal, 6:21. Chargers 13–0. **Drive: 20 plays, 76 yards, 10:29.**
- LAC – J. K. Dobbins 4-yard run (Cameron Dicker kick), 1:00. Chargers 20–0. **Drive: 11 plays, 56 yards, 3:32.**

**Third quarter**

- LAC – Cameron Dicker 46-yard field goal, 2:35. Chargers 23–0. **Drive: 11 plays, 63 yards, 4:58.**

**Fourth quarter**

- DEN – Troy Franklin 2-yard pass from Bo Nix (Wil Lutz kick), 10:06. Chargers 23–7. **Drive: 8 plays, 95 yards, 4:03.**
- DEN – Courtland Sutton 15-yard pass from Bo Nix (pass failed), 5:27. Chargers 23–13. **Drive: 8 plays, 64 yards, 3:03.**
- DEN – Wil Lutz 40-yard field goal, 0:59. Chargers 23–16. **Drive: 8 plays, 74 yards, 1:27.**

**Top passers**

- LAC – Justin Herbert – 21/34, 237 yards, TD
- DEN – Bo Nix – 19/33, 216 yards, 2 TD, INT

**Top rushers**

- LAC – J. K. Dobbins – 25 rushes, 96 yards, TD
- DEN – Bo Nix – 6 rushes, 61 yards

**Top receivers**

- LAC – Simi Fehoko – 2 receptions, 44 yards
- DEN – Devaughn Vele – 4 receptions, 78 yards

The Chargers defeated the Broncos in Denver for the first time since 2018 and improved to 3–2 on the season.

==== Week 7: at Arizona Cardinals ====
Week 7: Los Angeles Chargers at Arizona Cardinals – Game summary

Quarter	1	2	3	4	Total
Chargers	0	6	3	6	**15**
**Cardinals**	0	7	0	10	**17**

at State Farm Stadium, Glendale, Arizona

- Date: October 21
- Game time: 6:00 p.m. MST & PDT
- Game weather: Clear, 85 °F (29 °C) (retractable roof open)
- Game attendance: 64,357
- Referee: Clete Blakeman
- TV announcers (KCOP/ESPN+): Chris Fowler, Dan Orlovsky, Louis Riddick and Molly McGrath
  Game exclusive to KCOP through syndication. Out of market on ESPN+.
- Recap, Game Book

Game information

**First quarter**

- No scoring plays.

**Second quarter**

- LAC – Cameron Dicker 59-yard field goal, 11:59. Chargers 3–0. **Drive: 13 plays, 49 yards, 7:01.**
- ARI – Greg Dortch 5-yard pass from Kyler Murray (Chad Ryland kick), 5:40. Cardinals 7–3. **Drive: 10 plays, 79 yards, 6:19.**
- LAC – Cameron Dicker 50-yard field goal, 0:00. Cardinals 7–6. **Drive: 9 plays, 57 yards, 1:47.**

**Third quarter**

- LAC – Cameron Dicker 28-yard field goal, 0:40. Chargers 9–7. **Drive: 10 plays, 45 yards, 5:26.**

**Fourth quarter**

- ARI – Kyler Murray 44-yard run (Chad Ryland kick), 14:14. Cardinals 14–9. **Drive: 4 plays, 70 yards, 1:26.**
- LAC – Cameron Dicker 47-yard field goal, 12:09. Cardinals 14–12. **Drive: 6 plays, 41 yards, 2:05.**
- LAC – Cameron Dicker 40-yard field goal, 1:54. Chargers 15–14. **Drive: 15 plays, 77 yards, 8:12.**
- ARI – Chad Ryland 32-yard field goal, 0:00. Cardinals 17–15. **Drive: 7 plays, 56 yards, 1:54.**

**Top passers**

- LAC – Justin Herbert – 27/39, 349 yards
- ARI – Kyler Murray – 14/26, 145 yards, TD, INT

**Top rushers**

- LAC – J. K. Dobbins – 14 rushes, 40 yards
- ARI – James Conner – 19 rushes, 101 yards

**Top receivers**

- LAC – Will Dissly – 8 receptions, 81 yards
- ARI – James Conner – 2 receptions, 51 yards

==== Week 8: vs. New Orleans Saints ====
Week 8: New Orleans Saints at Los Angeles Chargers – Game summary

Quarter	1	2	3	4	Total
Saints	2	3	3	0	**8**
**Chargers**	0	9	7	10	**26**

at SoFi Stadium, Inglewood, California

- Date: October 27
- Game time: 1:05 p.m. PDT
- Game weather: Cloudy, 76 °F (24 °C) (fixed roof)
- Game attendance: 70,240
- Referee: Alan Eck
- TV announcers (Fox): Chris Myers, Mark Sanchez and Kristina Pink
- Recap, Game Book

Game information

**First quarter**

- NO – J. K. Scott fumble forced by Taysom Hill out of bounds in the end zone for safety, 10:20. Saints 2–0.

**Second quarter**

- LAC – Cameron Dicker 46-yard field goal, 14:55. Chargers 3–2. **Drive: 6 plays, 56 yards, 2:43.**
- LAC – J. K. Dobbins 1-yard run (kick failed, wide left), 1:37. Chargers 9–2. **Drive: 15 plays, 90 yards, 8:07.**
- NO – Blake Grupe 40-yard field goal, 0:05. Chargers 9–5. **Drive: 9 plays, 48 yards, 1:32.**

**Third quarter**

- LAC – Ladd McConkey 60-yard pass from Justin Herbert (Cameron Dicker kick), 8:48. Chargers 16–5. **Drive: 2 plays, 61 yards, 0:48.**
- NO – Blake Grupe 43-yard field goal, 1:05. Chargers 16–8. **Drive: 8 plays, 45 yards, 3:45.**

**Fourth quarter**

- LAC – Cameron Dicker 29-yard field goal, 11:55. Chargers 19–8. **Drive: 7 plays, 54 yards, 4:10.**
- LAC – Ladd McConkey 9-yard pass from Justin Herbert (Cameron Dicker kick), 3:22. Chargers 26–8. **Drive: 9 plays, 66 yards, 3:23.**

**Top passers**

- NO – Spencer Rattler – 12/24, 156 yards
- LAC – Justin Herbert – 20/32, 279 yards, 2 TD

**Top rushers**

- NO – Alvin Kamara – 10 rushes, 67 yards
- LAC – J. K. Dobbins – 17 rushes, 57 yards, TD

**Top receivers**

- NO – Chris Olave – 8 receptions, 107 yards
- LAC – Ladd McConkey – 6 receptions, 111 yards, 2 TD

The Chargers defeated the Saints for the first time since 2004, while holding them without a touchdown, and improved to 4–3 on the season.

==== Week 9: at Cleveland Browns ====
Week 9: Los Angeles Chargers at Cleveland Browns – Game summary

Quarter	1	2	3	4	Total
**Chargers**	7	13	0	7	**27**
Browns	0	3	0	7	**10**

at Huntington Bank Field, Cleveland, Ohio

- Date: November 3
- Game time: 1:00 p.m. EST/10:00 a.m. PST
- Game weather: Sunny, 57 °F (14 °C)
- Game attendance: 67,431
- Referee: Bill Vinovich
- TV announcers (CBS): Spero Dedes, Adam Archuleta and Aditi Kinkhabwala
- Recap, Game Book

Game information

**First quarter**

- LAC – Joshua Palmer 28-yard pass from Justin Herbert (Cameron Dicker kick), 6:49. Chargers 7–0. **Drive: 6 plays, 30 yards, 3:44.**

**Second quarter**

- CLE – Dustin Hopkins 38-yard field goal, 9:30. Chargers 7–3. **Drive: 10 plays, 34 yards, 5:19.**
- LAC – Quentin Johnston 66-yard pass from Justin Herbert (kick failed, wide left), 8:01. Chargers 13–3. **Drive: 3 plays, 70 yards, 1:29.**
- LAC – J. K. Dobbins 16-yard run (Cameron Dicker kick), 3:30. Chargers 20–3. **Drive: 5 plays, 60 yards, 2:47.**

**Third quarter**

- No scoring plays.

**Fourth quarter**

- LAC – J. K. Dobbins 7-yard run (Cameron Dicker kick), 4:16. Chargers 27–3. **Drive: 4 plays, 46 yards, 2:14.**
- CLE – Cedric Tillman 17-yard pass from Jameis Winston (Dustin Hopkins kick), 0:44. Chargers 27–10. **Drive: 12 plays, 70 yards, 3:32.**

**Top passers**

- LAC – Justin Herbert – 18/27, 282 yards, 2 TD
- CLE – Jameis Winston – 26/46, 235 yards, TD, 3 INT

**Top rushers**

- LAC – J. K. Dobbins – 14 rushes, 85 yards, 2 TD
- CLE – Nick Chubb – 15 rushes, 39 yards

**Top receivers**

- LAC – Quentin Johnston – 4 receptions, 118 yards, TD
- CLE – Cedric Tillman – 6 receptions, 75 yards, TD

==== Week 10: vs. Tennessee Titans ====
Week 10: Tennessee Titans at Los Angeles Chargers – Game summary

Quarter	1	2	3	4	Total
Titans	7	0	3	7	**17**
**Chargers**	3	10	7	7	**27**

at SoFi Stadium, Inglewood, California

- Date: November 10
- Game time: 1:05 p.m. PST
- Game weather: Sunny, 73 °F (23 °C) (fixed roof)
- Game attendance: 68,796
- Referee: Craig Wrolstad
- TV announcers (Fox): Kenny Albert, Jonathan Vilma and Megan Olivi
- Recap, Game Book

Game information

**First quarter**

- LAC – Cameron Dicker 21-yard field goal, 8:08. Chargers 3–0. **Drive: 12 plays, 68 yards, 6:52.**
- TEN – Calvin Ridley 41-yard pass from Will Levis (Nick Folk kick), 4:25. Titans 7–3. **Drive: 7 plays, 72 yards, 3:43.**

**Second quarter**

- LAC – Cameron Dicker 37-yard field goal, 12:07. Titans 7–6. **Drive: 9 plays, 57 yards, 3:41.**
- LAC – Justin Herbert 4-yard run (Cameron Dicker kick), 1:55. Chargers 13–7. **Drive: 8 plays, 61 yards, 4:24.**

**Third quarter**

- TEN – Nick Folk 27-yard field goal, 7:51. Chargers 13–10. **Drive: 11 plays, 62 yards, 7:09.**
- LAC – Quentin Johnston 16-yard pass from Justin Herbert (Cameron Dicker kick), 3:24. Chargers 20–10. **Drive: 7 plays, 43 yards, 4:27.**

**Fourth quarter**

- LAC – Hassan Haskins 1-yard run (Cameron Dicker kick), 7:39. Chargers 27–10. **Drive: 11 plays, 95 yards, 7:10.**
- TEN – Calvin Ridley 15-yard pass from Will Levis (Nick Folk kick), 0:49. Chargers 27–17. **Drive: 9 plays, 61 yards, 2:35.**

**Top passers**

- TEN – Will Levis – 18/23, 175 yards, 2 TD
- LAC – Justin Herbert – 14/18, 164 yards, TD

**Top rushers**

- TEN – Tyjae Spears – 7 rushes, 47 yards
- LAC – Gus Edwards – 10 rushes, 55 yards

**Top receivers**

- TEN – Calvin Ridley – 5 receptions, 84 yards, 2 TD
- LAC – Ladd McConkey – 2 receptions, 52 yards

The Chargers improved to 6–3 and remained undefeated at home against the Titans since their move to Tennessee, having not lost to them at home since 1990, when the Titans were still in Houston.

==== Week 11: vs. Cincinnati Bengals ====
Week 11: Cincinnati Bengals at Los Angeles Chargers – Game summary

Quarter	1	2	3	4	Total
Bengals	3	3	14	7	**27**
**Chargers**	7	17	3	7	**34**

at SoFi Stadium, Inglewood, California

- Date: November 17
- Game time: 5:20 p.m. PST
- Game weather: Clear, 59 °F (15 °C) (fixed roof)
- Game attendance: 70,240
- Referee: Brad Allen
- TV announcers (NBC): Mike Tirico, Cris Collinsworth and Melissa Stark
- Recap, Game Book

Game information

**First quarter**

- CIN – Evan McPherson 26-yard field goal, 6:27. Bengals 3–0. **Drive: 9 plays, 56 yards, 3:50.**
- LAC – Will Dissly 29-yard pass from Justin Herbert (Cameron Dicker kick), 3:34. Chargers 7–3. **Drive: 5 plays, 70 yards, 2:53.**

**Second quarter**

- CIN – Evan McPherson 27-yard field goal, 12:54. Chargers 7–6. **Drive: 11 plays, 57 yards, 5:40.**
- LAC – Quentin Johnston 26-yard pass from Justin Herbert (Cameron Dicker kick), 11:02. Chargers 14–6. **Drive: 4 plays, 71 yards, 1:52.**
- LAC – J. K. Dobbins 1-yard run (Cameron Dicker kick), 0:00. Chargers 21–6. **Drive: 9 plays, 66 yards, 4:53.**
- LAC – Cameron Dicker 19-yard field goal, 0:00. Chargers 24–6. **Drive: 11 plays, 78 yards, 2:33.**

**Third quarter**

- LAC – Cameron Dicker 53-yard field goal, 10:29. Chargers 27–6. **Drive: 7 plays, 24 yards, 2:54.**
- CIN – Ja'Marr Chase 4-yard pass from Joe Burrow (Evan McPherson kick), 5:27. Chargers 27–13. **Drive: 11 plays, 70 yards, 5:02.**
- CIN – Tee Higgins 42-yard pass from Joe Burrow (Evan McPherson kick), 2:53. Chargers 27–20. **Drive: 4 plays, 50 yards, 1:34.**

**Fourth quarter**

- CIN – Ja'Marr Chase 17-yard pass from Joe Burrow (Evan McPherson kick), 12:21. Tied 27–27. **Drive: 7 plays, 71 yards, 2:29.**
- LAC – J. K. Dobbins 29-yard run (Cameron Dicker kick), 0:18. Chargers 34–27. **Drive: 4 plays, 84 yards, 0:27.**

**Top passers**

- CIN – Joe Burrow – 28/50, 356 yards, 3 TD
- LAC – Justin Herbert – 17/36, 297 yards, 2 TD

**Top rushers**

- CIN – Chase Brown – 22 rushes, 86 yards
- LAC – Justin Herbert – 5 rushes, 65 yards

**Top receivers**

- CIN – Tee Higgins – 9 receptions, 148 yards, TD
- LAC – Ladd McConkey – 6 receptions, 123 yards

The Chargers were able to stave off a fierce Cincinnati comeback and score a late touchdown to prevail and improve to 7–3 on the season.

==== Week 12: vs. Baltimore Ravens ====
Week 12: Baltimore Ravens at Los Angeles Chargers – Game summary

Quarter	1	2	3	4	Total
**Ravens**	0	14	3	13	**30**
Chargers	7	6	3	7	**23**

at SoFi Stadium, Inglewood, California

- Date: November 25
- Game time: 5:15 p.m. PST
- Game weather: Clear, 61 °F (16 °C) (fixed roof)
- Game attendance: 70,240
- Referee: Carl Cheffers
- TV announcers (ESPN): Joe Buck, Troy Aikman, Lisa Salters and Laura Rutledge
- Recap, Game Book

Game information

**First quarter**

- LAC – Justin Herbert 5-yard run (Cameron Dicker kick), 9:45. Chargers 7–0. **Drive: 9 plays, 70 yards, 5:15.**

**Second quarter**

- LAC – Cameron Dicker 42-yard field goal, 11:26. Chargers 10–0. **Drive: 11 plays, 40 yards, 5:33.**
- BAL – Lamar Jackson 10-yard run (Justin Tucker kick), 7:48. Chargers 10–7. **Drive: 7 plays, 70 yards, 3:38.**
- BAL – Rashod Bateman 40-yard pass from Lamar Jackson (Justin Tucker kick), 0:24. Ravens 14–10. **Drive: 8 plays, 93 yards, 3:30.**
- LAC – Cameron Dicker 52-yard field goal, 0:00. Ravens 14–13. **Drive: 5 plays, 36 yards, 0:24.**

**Third quarter**

- BAL – Justin Tucker 45-yard field goal, 9:29. Ravens 17–13. **Drive: 10 plays, 43 yards, 5:31.**
- LAC – Cameron Dicker 52-yard field goal, 4:08. Ravens 17–16. **Drive: 10 plays, 36 yards, 5:21.**

**Fourth quarter**

- BAL – Mark Andrews 6-yard pass from Lamar Jackson (pass failed), 12:32. Ravens 23–16. **Drive: 14 plays, 70 yards, 6:36.**
- BAL – Justice Hill 51-yard run (Justin Tucker kick), 7:24. Ravens 30–16. **Drive: 6 plays, 72 yards, 3:21.**
- LAC – Gus Edwards 1-yard run (Cameron Dicker kick), 0:46. Ravens 30–23. **Drive: 11 plays, 63 yards, 2:22.**

**Top passers**

- BAL – Lamar Jackson – 16/22, 177 yards, 2 TD
- LAC – Justin Herbert – 21/36, 218 yards

**Top rushers**

- BAL – Derrick Henry – 24 rushes, 140 yards
- LAC – J. K. Dobbins – 6 rushes, 40 yards

**Top receivers**

- BAL – Zay Flowers – 5 receptions, 62 yards
- LAC – Ladd McConkey – 6 receptions, 83 yards

==== Week 13: at Atlanta Falcons ====
Week 13: Los Angeles Chargers at Atlanta Falcons – Game summary

Quarter	1	2	3	4	Total
**Chargers**	3	6	8	0	**17**
Falcons	7	0	6	0	**13**

at Mercedes-Benz Stadium, Atlanta, Georgia

- Date: December 1
- Game time: 1:00 p.m. EST/10:00 a.m. PST
- Game weather: None (retractable roof closed)
- Game attendance: 72,139
- Referee: Clete Blakeman
- TV announcers (CBS): Kevin Harlan, Trent Green and Melanie Collins
- Recap, Game Book

Game information

**First quarter**

- ATL – Bijan Robinson 2-yard run (Younghoe Koo kick), 3:59. Falcons 7–0. **Drive: 5 plays, 29 yards, 3:01.**
- LAC – Cameron Dicker 45-yard field goal, 1:39. Falcons 7–3. **Drive: 5 plays, 43 yards, 2:20.**

**Second quarter**

- LAC – Cameron Dicker 51-yard field goal, 11:08. Falcons 7–6. **Drive: 7 plays, 33 yards, 3:44.**
- LAC – Cameron Dicker 34-yard field goal, 0:58. Chargers 9–7. **Drive: 16 plays, 63 yards, 7:55.**

**Third quarter**

- ATL – Younghoe Koo 41-yard field goal, 7:23. Falcons 10–9. **Drive: 11 plays, 66 yards, 5:58.**
- LAC – Tarheeb Still 61-yard interception return (Justin Herbert–Joshua Palmer pass), 1:39. Chargers 17–10.
- ATL – Younghoe Koo 26-yard field goal, 0:03. Chargers 17–13. **Drive: 6 plays, 62 yards, 1:36.**

**Fourth quarter**

- No scoring plays.

**Top passers**

- LAC – Justin Herbert – 16/23, 147 yards
- ATL – Kirk Cousins – 24/39, 245 yards, 4 INT

**Top rushers**

- LAC – Gus Edwards – 6 rushes, 32 yards
- ATL – Bijan Robinson – 26 rushes, 102 yards, TD

**Top receivers**

- LAC – Ladd McConkey – 9 receptions, 117 yards
- ATL – Ray-Ray McCloud – 4 receptions, 95 yards

==== Week 14: at Kansas City Chiefs ====
Week 14: Los Angeles Chargers at Kansas City Chiefs – Game summary

Quarter	1	2	3	4	Total
Chargers	0	0	14	3	**17**
**Chiefs**	3	10	0	6	**19**

at Arrowhead Stadium, Kansas City, Missouri

- Date: December 8
- Game time: 7:20 p.m. CST/5:20 p.m. PST
- Game weather: 50 °F (10 °C)
- Game attendance: 73,571
- Referee: Bill Vinovich
- TV announcers (NBC): Mike Tirico, Cris Collinsworth and Melissa Stark
- Recap, Game Book

Game information

**First quarter**

- KC – Matthew Wright 47-yard field goal, 10:05. Chiefs 3–0. **Drive: 11 plays, 34 yards, 4:55.**

**Second quarter**

- KC – Matthew Wright 33-yard field goal, 7:47. Chiefs 6–0. **Drive: 7 plays, 40 yards, 3:33.**
- KC – DeAndre Hopkins 9-yard pass from Patrick Mahomes (Matthew Wright kick), 0:47. Chiefs 13–0. **Drive: 9 plays, 77 yards, 2:41.**

**Third quarter**

- LAC – Gus Edwards 3-yard run (Cameron Dicker kick), 7:12. Chiefs 13–7. **Drive: 13 plays, 79 yards, 7:48.**
- LAC – Quentin Johnston 4-yard pass from Justin Herbert (Cameron Dicker kick), 3:30. Chargers 14–13. **Drive: 4 plays, 74 yards, 2:12.**

**Fourth quarter**

- KC – Matthew Wright 50-yard field goal, 13:04. Chiefs 16–14. **Drive: 12 plays, 45 yards, 5:26.**
- LAC – Cameron Dicker 37-yard field goal, 4:35. Chargers 17–16. **Drive: 14 plays, 57 yards, 8:29.**
- KC – Matthew Wright 31-yard field goal, 0:00. Chiefs 19–17. **Drive: 14 plays, 47 yards, 4:35.**

**Top passers**

- LAC – Justin Herbert – 21/30, 213 yards, TD
- KC – Patrick Mahomes – 24/37, 210 yards, TD

**Top rushers**

- LAC – Gus Edwards – 10 rushes, 36 yards, TD
- KC – Isiah Pacheco – 14 rushes, 55 yards

**Top receivers**

- LAC – Joshua Palmer – 6 receptions, 78 yards
- KC – Travis Kelce – 5 receptions, 45 yards

==== Week 15: vs. Tampa Bay Buccaneers ====
Week 15: Tampa Bay Buccaneers at Los Angeles Chargers – Game summary

Quarter	1	2	3	4	Total
**Buccaneers**	7	6	17	10	**40**
Chargers	7	10	0	0	**17**

at SoFi Stadium, Inglewood, California

- Date: December 15
- Game time: 1:25 p.m. PST
- Game weather: Sunny, 66 °F (19 °C) (fixed roof)
- Game attendance: 69,496
- Referee: Scott Novak
- TV announcers (Fox): Adam Amin, Mark Sanchez and Kristina Pink
- Recap, Game Book

Game information

**First quarter**

- TB – Jalen McMillan 26-yard pass from Baker Mayfield (Chase McLaughlin kick), 11:14. Buccaneers 7–0. **Drive: 7 plays, 70 yards, 3:46.**
- LAC – Ladd McConkey 7-yard pass from Justin Herbert (Cameron Dicker kick), 6:18. Tied 7–7. **Drive: 10 plays, 70 yards, 4:56.**

**Second quarter**

- TB – Chase McLaughlin 22-yard field goal, 13:41. Buccaneers 10–7. **Drive: 12 plays, 67 yards, 7:37.**
- LAC – Cameron Dicker 41-yard field goal, 8:47. Tied 10–10. **Drive: 8 plays, 51 yards, 4:54.**
- LAC – Quentin Johnston 13-yard pass from Justin Herbert (Cameron Dicker kick), 7:12. Chargers 17–10. **Drive: 3 plays, 27 yards, 1:27.**
- TB – Chase McLaughlin 37-yard field goal, 0:33. Chargers 17–13. **Drive: 12 plays, 61 yards, 3:04.**

**Third quarter**

- TB – Mike Evans 57-yard pass from Baker Mayfield (Chase McLaughlin kick), 10:23. Buccaneers 20–17. **Drive: 5 plays, 83 yards, 2:54.**
- TB – Chase McLaughlin 42-yard field goal, 5:06. Buccaneers 23–17. **Drive: 5 plays, 46 yards, 2:47.**
- TB – Mike Evans 35-yard pass from Baker Mayfield (Chase McLaughlin kick), 1:36. Buccaneers 30–17. **Drive: 4 plays, 42 yards, 2:58.**

**Fourth quarter**

- TB – Rachaad White 11-yard pass from Baker Mayfield (Chase McLaughlin kick), 7:37. Buccaneers 37–17. **Drive: 9 plays, 66 yards, 6:01.**
- TB – Chase McLaughlin 43-yard field goal, 2:51. Buccaneers 40–17. **Drive: 9 plays, 30 yards, 3:20.**

**Top passers**

- TB – Baker Mayfield – 22/27, 288 yards, 4 TD, INT
- LAC – Justin Herbert – 21/33, 195 yards, 2 TD, INT

**Top rushers**

- TB – Bucky Irving – 15 rushes, 117 yards
- LAC – Gus Edwards – 8 rushes, 23 yards

**Top receivers**

- TB – Mike Evans – 9 receptions, 159 yards, 2 TD
- LAC – Ladd McConkey – 5 receptions, 58 yards, TD

==== Week 16: vs. Denver Broncos ====
Week 16: Denver Broncos at Los Angeles Chargers – Game summary

Quarter	1	2	3	4	Total
Broncos	7	14	3	3	**27**
**Chargers**	7	6	6	15	**34**

at SoFi Stadium, Inglewood, California

- Date: December 19
- Game time: 5:15 p.m. PST
- Game weather: Clear, 64 °F (18 °C) (fixed roof)
- Game attendance: 70,240
- Referee: Clay Martin
- TV announcers (KTTV/Prime Video): Al Michaels, Kirk Herbstreit and Kaylee Hartung
  Game exclusive to KTTV through syndication. Out of market on Prime Video.
- Recap, Game Book

Game information

**First quarter**

- DEN – Audric Estimé 3-yard run (Wil Lutz kick), 7:34. Broncos 7–0. **Drive: 10 plays, 72 yards, 5:56.**
- LAC – Gus Edwards 1-yard run (Cameron Dicker kick), 3:09. Tied 7–7. **Drive: 8 plays, 70 yards, 4:25.**

**Second quarter**

- DEN – Michael Burton 1-yard pass from Bo Nix (Wil Lutz kick), 12:17. Broncos 14–7. **Drive: 12 plays, 70 yards, 5:52.**
- LAC – Cameron Dicker 37-yard field goal, 8:50. Broncos 14–10. **Drive: 8 plays, 51 yards, 3:27.**
- DEN – Devaughn Vele 6-yard pass from Bo Nix (Wil Lutz kick), 6:22. Broncos 21–10. **Drive: 6 plays, 70 yards, 2:28.**
- LAC – Cameron Dicker 57-yard field goal, 0:00. Broncos 21–13. **Drive: 1 play, 0 yards, 0:00.**

**Third quarter**

- DEN – Wil Lutz 41-yard field goal, 8:31. Broncos 24–13. **Drive: 11 plays, 47 yards, 6:29.**
- LAC – Gus Edwards 5-yard run (run failed), 2:58. Broncos 24–19. **Drive: 10 plays, 70 yards, 5:33.**

**Fourth quarter**

- LAC – Derius Davis 19-yard pass from Justin Herbert (Justin Herbert–Joshua Palmer pass), 12:23. Chargers 27–24. **Drive: 7 plays, 78 yards, 3:22.**
- LAC – Hassan Haskins 34-yard pass from Justin Herbert (Cameron Dicker kick), 2:27. Chargers 34–24. **Drive: 6 plays, 90 yards, 2:01.**
- DEN – Wil Lutz 55-yard field goal, 0:57. Chargers 34–27. **Drive: 7 plays, 33 yards, 1:30.**

**Top passers**

- DEN – Bo Nix – 29/40, 263 yards, 2 TD
- LAC – Justin Herbert – 23/30, 284 yards, 2 TD, INT

**Top rushers**

- DEN – Audric Estimé – 9 rushes, 48 yards, TD
- LAC – Gus Edwards – 14 rushes, 68 yards, 2 TD

**Top receivers**

- DEN – Marvin Mims – 3 receptions, 62 yards
- LAC – Ladd McConkey – 6 receptions, 87 yards

At the end of the 1st half, the Chargers kicked a rare "free kick" field goal, making it the first successful one in 48 years. With the win, the Chargers swept the Broncos for the first time since 2010 when they still played in San Diego.

==== Week 17: at New England Patriots ====
Week 17: Los Angeles Chargers at New England Patriots – Game summary

Quarter	1	2	3	4	Total
**Chargers**	7	13	10	10	**40**
Patriots	0	7	0	0	**7**

at Gillette Stadium, Foxborough, Massachusetts

- Date: December 28
- Game time: 1:00 p.m. EST/10:00 a.m. PST
- Game weather: Mostly cloudy, 40 °F (4 °C)
- Game attendance: 64,628
- Referee: John Hussey
- TV announcers (KCBS/NFLN): Chris Rose, Ross Tucker and Steve Wyche
  Game exclusive to KCBS through syndication. Out of market on the NFL Network.
- Recap, Game Book

Game information

**First quarter**

- LAC – Derius Davis 23-yard pass from Justin Herbert (Cameron Dicker kick), 3:21. Chargers 7–0. **Drive: 11 plays, 91 yards, 6:12.**

**Second quarter**

- LAC – Cameron Dicker 27-yard field goal, 10:15. Chargers 10–0. **Drive: 12 plays, 67 yards, 6:43.**
- LAC – Ladd McConkey 6-yard pass from Justin Herbert (Cameron Dicker kick), 2:55. Chargers 17–0. **Drive: 9 plays, 44 yards, 5:40.**
- NE – Demario Douglas 36-yard pass from Drake Maye (Joey Slye kick), 1:24. Chargers 17–7. **Drive: 5 plays, 73 yards, 1:31.**
- LAC – Cameron Dicker 38-yard field goal, 0:02. Chargers 20–7. **Drive: 8 plays, 50 yards, 1:22.**

**Third quarter**

- LAC – Ladd McConkey 40-yard pass from Justin Herbert (Cameron Dicker kick), 7:37. Chargers 27–7. **Drive: 10 plays, 94 yards, 5:20.**
- LAC – Cameron Dicker 41-yard field goal, 5:43. Chargers 30–7. **Drive: 4 plays, 0 yards, 0:19.**

**Fourth quarter**

- LAC – J. K. Dobbins 2-yard run (Cameron Dicker kick), 11:58. Chargers 37–7. **Drive: 10 plays, 63 yards, 5:20.**
- LAC – Cameron Dicker 35-yard field goal, 3:47. Chargers 40–7. **Drive: 4 plays, 9 yards, 1:38.**

**Top passers**

- LAC – Justin Herbert – 26/38, 283 yards, 3 TD
- NE – Drake Maye – 12/22, 117 yards, TD

**Top rushers**

- LAC – J. K. Dobbins – 19 rushes, 76 yards, TD
- NE – Antonio Gibson – 12 rushes, 63 yards

**Top receivers**

- LAC – Ladd McConkey – 8 receptions, 94 yards, 2 TD
- NE – Demario Douglas – 4 receptions, 46 yards, TD

With the blowout win the Chargers secured their first playoff berth since 2022. It was also the Chargers second win in a row against New England.

==== Week 18: at Las Vegas Raiders ====
Week 18: Los Angeles Chargers at Las Vegas Raiders – Game summary

Quarter	1	2	3	4	Total
**Chargers**	3	14	3	14	**34**
Raiders	3	7	3	7	**20**

at Allegiant Stadium, Paradise, Nevada

- Date: January 5
- Game time: 1:25 p.m. PST
- Game weather: None (indoor stadium)
- Game attendance: 61,352
- Referee: Carl Cheffers
- TV announcers (CBS): Kevin Harlan, Trent Green and Melanie Collins
- Recap, Game Book

Game information

**First quarter**

- LV – Daniel Carlson 40-yard field goal, 2:46. Raiders 3–0. **Drive: 7 plays, 37 yards, 2:17.**
- LAC – Cameron Dicker 33-yard field goal, 0:11. Tied 3–3. **Drive: 6 plays, 55 yards, 2:35.**

**Second quarter**

- LV – Jakobi Meyers 25-yard pass from Aidan O'Connell (Daniel Carlson kick), 13:04. Raiders 10–3. **Drive: 5 plays, 70 yards, 2:07.**
- LAC – Cameron Dicker 32-yard field goal, 5:28. Raiders 10–6. **Drive: 15 plays, 56 yards, 7:36.**
- LAC – Cameron Dicker 49-yard field goal, 1:05. Raiders 10–9. **Drive: 9 plays, 52 yards, 2:47.**
- LAC – D. J. Chark 6-yard pass from Justin Herbert (Justin Herbert-Ladd McConkey pass), 0:10. Chargers 17–10. **Drive: 4 plays, 30 yards, 0:28.**

**Third quarter**

- LAC – Cameron Dicker 20-yard field goal, 7:10. Chargers 20–10. **Drive: 13 plays, 69 yards, 7:50.**
- LV – Daniel Carlson 47-yard field goal, 2:15. Chargers 20–13. **Drive: 8 plays, 41 yards, 4:55.**

**Fourth quarter**

- LAC – Will Dissly 2-yard pass from Justin Herbert (Cameron Dicker kick), 13:32. Chargers 27–13. **Drive: 7 plays, 70 yards, 3:43.**
- LAC – Hassan Haskins 2-yard run (Cameron Dicker kick), 3:38. Chargers 34–13. **Drive: 12 plays, 81 yards, 7:12.**
- LV – Brock Bowers 12-yard pass from Aidan O'Connell (Daniel Carlson kick), 0:25. Chargers 34–20. **Drive: 12 plays, 70 yards, 3:13.**

**Top passers**

- LAC – Justin Herbert – 28/36, 346 yards, 2 TD
- LV – Aidan O'Connell – 24/34, 214 yards, 2 TD, INT

**Top rushers**

- LAC – J. K. Dobbins – 18 rushes, 63 yards
- LV – Alexander Mattison – 6 rushes, 20 yards

**Top receivers**

- LAC – Quentin Johnston – 13 receptions, 186 yards
- LV – Jakobi Meyers – 9 receptions, 123 yards, TD

=== Standings ===
==== Division ====
AFC West
	W	L	T	PCT	DIV	CONF	PF	PA	STK
^{(1)} Kansas City Chiefs	15	2	0	.882	5–1	10–2	385	326	L1
^{(5)} Los Angeles Chargers	11	6	0	.647	4–2	8–4	402	301	W3
^{(7)} Denver Broncos	10	7	0	.588	3–3	6–6	425	311	W1
Las Vegas Raiders	4	13	0	.235	0–6	3–9	309	434	L1

==== Conference ====
AFC
Seed	Team	Division	W	L	T	PCT	DIV	CONF	SOS	SOV	STK
**Division leaders**
1	Kansas City Chiefs	West	15	2	0	.882	5–1	10–2	.488	.463	L1
2	Buffalo Bills	East	13	4	0	.765	5–1	9–3	.467	.448	L1
3	Baltimore Ravens	North	12	5	0	.706	4–2	8–4	.529	.525	W4
4	Houston Texans	South	10	7	0	.588	5–1	8–4	.481	.376	W1
**Wild cards**
5	Los Angeles Chargers	West	11	6	0	.647	4–2	8–4	.467	.348	W3
6 (Note: Pittsburgh clinched the #6 seed over Denver based on head-to-head victory.)	Pittsburgh Steelers	North	10	7	0	.588	3–3	7–5	.502	.453	L4
7	Denver Broncos	West	10	7	0	.588	3–3	6–6	.502	.394	W1
**Did not qualify for the postseason**
8	Cincinnati Bengals	North	9	8	0	.529	3–3	6–6	.478	.314	W5
9 (Note: Indianapolis finished ahead of Miami based on head-to-head victory.)	Indianapolis Colts	South	8	9	0	.471	3–3	7–5	.457	.309	W1
10	Miami Dolphins	East	8	9	0	.471	3–3	6–6	.419	.294	L1
11	New York Jets	East	5	12	0	.294	2–4	5–7	.495	.341	W1
12 (Note: Jacksonville finished ahead of New England and Las Vegas based on conference record. (Jacksonville 4–8 to New England 3–9 to Las Vegas 3–9))	Jacksonville Jaguars	South	4	13	0	.235	3–3	4–8	.478	.265	L1
13 (Note: New England finished ahead of Las Vegas based on strength of victory. (New England .471 to Las Vegas .353))	New England Patriots	East	4	13	0	.235	2–4	3–9	.471	.471	W1
14	Las Vegas Raiders	West	4	13	0	.235	0–6	3–9	.540	.353	L1
15 (Note: Cleveland finished ahead of Tennessee based on strength of victory. (Cleveland .510 to Tennessee .431))	Cleveland Browns	North	3	14	0	.176	2–4	3–9	.536	.510	L6
16	Tennessee Titans	South	3	14	0	.176	1–5	3–9	.522	.431	L6
**Tiebreakers** (Note: When breaking ties for three or more teams under the NFL's rules, they are first broken within divisions, then comparing only the highest ranked remaining team from each division.)

== Postseason ==
=== Schedule ===
Round	Date	Opponent (seed)	Result	Record	Venue	Recap
Wild Card	January 11	at Houston Texans (4)	L 12–32	0–1	NRG Stadium	Recap

=== Game summaries ===
==== AFC Wild Card Playoffs: at (4) Houston Texans ====
AFC Wild Card Playoffs: (5) Los Angeles Chargers at (4) Houston Texans – Game summary

Quarter	1	2	3	4	Total
Chargers	6	0	0	6	12
Texans	0	10	10	12	32

at NRG Stadium, Houston, Texas

- Date: January 11, 2025
- Game time: 3:30 p.m. CST/1:30 p.m. PST
- Game weather: None (retractable roof closed)
- Game attendance: 71,408
- Referee: Land Clark
- TV announcers (CBS/Nickelodeon): Ian Eagle, Charles Davis and Evan Washburn (CBS)
  Nate Burleson (Nickelodeon)
- Recap, Game Book

Game information

First quarter

- LAC – Cameron Dicker 35-yard field goal, 9:37. Chargers 3–0. Drive: 10 plays, 57 yards, 5:23.
- LAC – Cameron Dicker 39-yard field goal, 6:35. Chargers 6–0. Drive: 6 plays, 12 yards, 2:53.

Second quarter

- HOU – Nico Collins 13-yard pass from C. J. Stroud (Ka'imi Fairbairn kick), 0:58. Texans 7–6. Drive: 13 plays, 99 yards, 5:17.
- HOU – Ka'imi Fairbairn 41-yard field goal, 0:03. Texans 10–6. Drive: 5 plays, 45 yards, 0:24.

Third quarter

- HOU – Ka'imi Fairbairn 37-yard field goal, 4:48. Texans 13–6. Drive: 10 plays, 46 yards, 5:22.
- HOU – Eric Murray 38-yard interception return (Ka'imi Fairbairn kick), 0:13. Texans 20–6.

Fourth quarter

- HOU – Ka'imi Fairbairn 30-yard field goal, 12:00. Texans 23–6. Drive: 4 plays, 1 yard, 1:44.
- LAC – Ladd McConkey 86-yard pass from Justin Herbert (kick blocked), 10:38. Texans 23–12. Drive: 3 plays, 70 yards, 1:22.
- HOU – Blocked kick returned by D'Angelo Ross, 10:38. Texans 25–12.
- HOU – Joe Mixon 17-yard run (Ka'imi Fairbairn kick), 3:42. Texans 32–12. Drive: 14 plays, 74 yards, 6:56.

Top passers

- LAC – Justin Herbert – 14/32, 242 yards, TD, 4 INT
- HOU – C. J. Stroud – 22/33, 282 yards, TD, INT

Top rushers

- LAC – J. K. Dobbins – 9 rushes, 26 yards
- HOU – Joe Mixon – 25 rushes, 106 yards, TD

Top receivers

- LAC – Ladd McConkey – 9 receptions, 197 yards, TD
- HOU – Nico Collins – 7 receptions, 122 yards, TD

Despite taking a 6–0 lead in the 1st quarter, the Texans dominated the Chargers for the rest of the game, as Justin Herbert threw 4 interceptions, which is more than he threw for the entire season. This was the first time the Chargers faced the Texans in the playoffs.
