= Los Angeles Chargers =

NFL team in Inglewood, California

- Current season
Logo	Wordmark
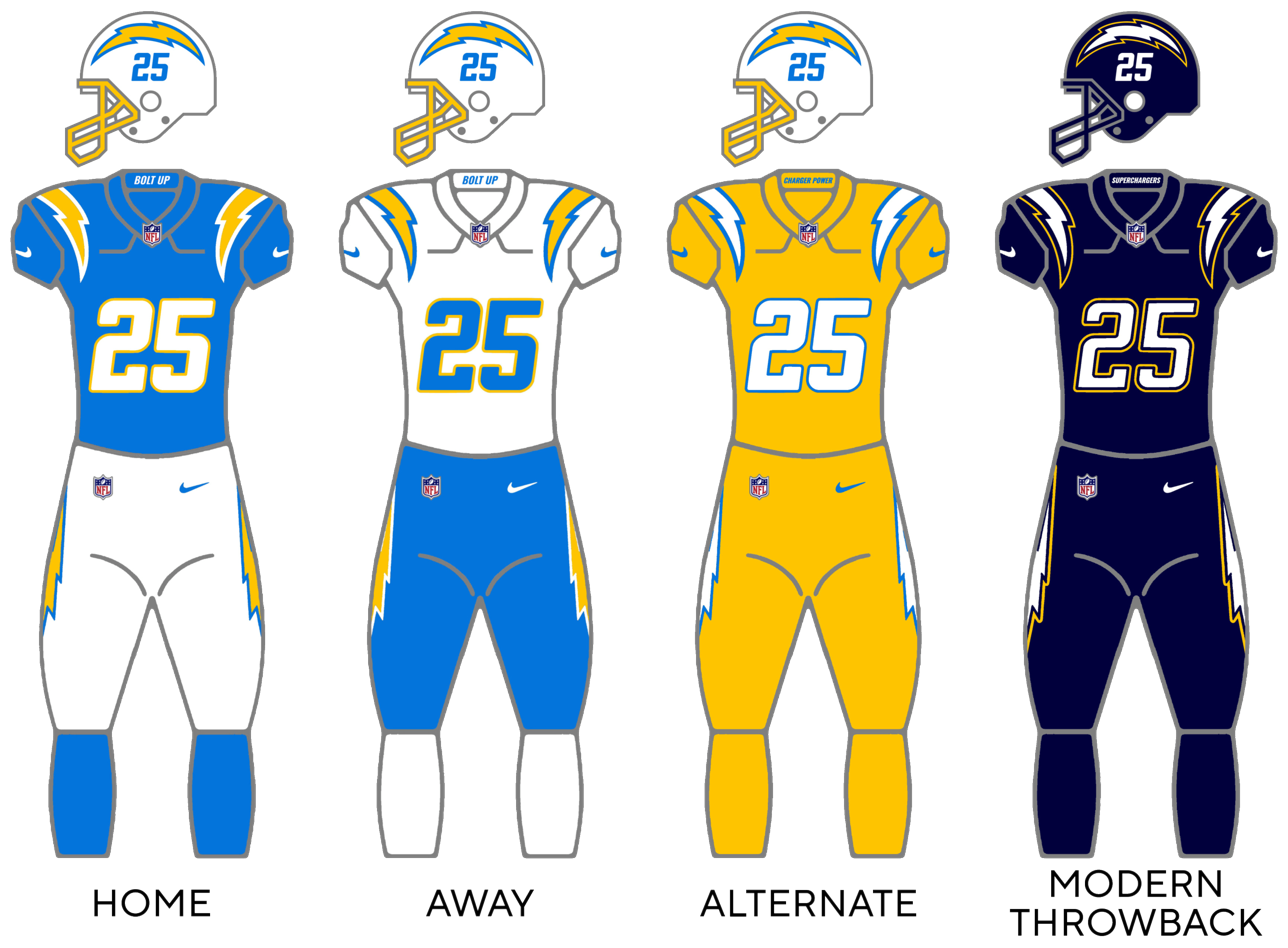
- Uniforms

General information
- Founded: August 14, 1959; 67 years ago
- Stadium: SoFi Stadium; Inglewood, California
- Headquartered: The Bolt; El Segundo, California
- Colors: Powder blue, sunshine gold, white
- Website: chargers.com

Personnel
- Owner: Dean Spanos
- General manager: Joe Hortiz
- Head coach: Jim Harbaugh
- President: A. G. Spanos

Nicknames
- The Bolts; Super Chargers

Team history
- Los Angeles Chargers (1960, 2017–present); San Diego Chargers (1961–2016)

Home fields
- Los Angeles Memorial Coliseum (1960); Balboa Stadium (1961–1966); San Diego Stadium (1967–2016); Sun Devil Stadium (2003, 1 game due to the Cedar Fire); Dignity Health Sports Park (2017–2019); SoFi Stadium (2020–present)

League / conference affiliations
- American Football League (1960–1969): Western Division (1960–1969); National Football League (1970–present): American Football Conference (since 1970); AFC West (since 1970)

Championships
- League championships: 1: AFL championships (pre-1970 AFL–NFL merger) (1) 1963
- Conference championships: 1: AFC: 1994
- Division championships: 15: AFL Western: 1960, 1961, 1963, 1964, 1965; AFC West: 1979, 1980, 1981, 1992, 1994, 2004, 2006, 2007, 2008, 2009

Playoff appearances (22)
- AFL: 1960, 1961, 1963, 1964, 1965; NFL: 1979, 1980, 1981, 1982, 1992, 1994, 1995, 2004, 2006, 2007, 2008, 2009, 2013, 2018, 2022, 2024, 2025

Owners
- Barron Hilton (1959–1966); Gene Klein (1966–1984); Alex Spanos (1984–2018); Dean Spanos (since 2018)

The Los Angeles Chargers are a professional American football team based in the Greater Los Angeles area. The Chargers compete in the National Football League (NFL) as a member of the American Football Conference (AFC) West division. The team plays its home games at SoFi Stadium in Inglewood, California, which it shares with the Los Angeles Rams.

The Chargers were founded in Los Angeles in 1959, and began play in 1960 as a charter member of the American Football League (AFL). They spent their first season in Los Angeles before moving to San Diego in 1961 to become the San Diego Chargers. The team joined the NFL as a result of the AFL–NFL merger in 1970. In 2017, the Chargers moved back to Los Angeles after 56 seasons in San Diego, a year after the Rams had moved back to the city after spending 21 seasons (1995–2015) in St. Louis. The team previously played at the Los Angeles Memorial Coliseum during their first stint in Los Angeles, Balboa Stadium and San Diego Stadium (also known as Jack Murphy Stadium and Qualcomm Stadium) while in San Diego, and Dignity Health Sports Park (formerly named StubHub Center) from 2017 to 2019, while SoFi Stadium was under construction.

The Chargers won the AFL championship in 1963, and reached the AFL playoffs five times and the AFL Championship game four times before joining the NFL. Since then, the Chargers have made 15 trips to the playoffs and made four appearances in the AFC Championship game. In 1994, the Chargers won their first and only AFC championship, and faced the San Francisco 49ers in Super Bowl XXIX, losing 49–26. The Chargers have the worst playoff winning percentage with a .364 winning percentage in the postseason. The Chargers have nine players and two coaches enshrined in the Pro Football Hall of Fame: wide receiver Lance Alworth (1962–1970), defensive end Fred Dean (1975–1981), quarterback Dan Fouts (1973–1987), head coach and general manager Sid Gillman (1960–1969, 1971), wide receiver Charlie Joiner (1976–1986), offensive tackle Ron Mix (1960–1969), tight end Kellen Winslow (1979–1987), middle linebacker Junior Seau (1990–2002), running back LaDainian Tomlinson (2001–2009), head coach Don Coryell (1978–1986), and tight end Antonio Gates (2003–2018).

According to an article in Forbes, the Los Angeles Chargers were worth 5.1 billion dollars in August 2024, putting them at number 20 on the list of the most valuable NFL teams.

== History ==
=== First season in Los Angeles (1960) ===
The Chargers were established with seven other American Football League teams in 1959. They began AFL play in Los Angeles the following year in 1960. The Chargers' original owner was hotel heir Barron Hilton, son of Hilton Hotels founder Conrad Hilton. According to the official website of the Pro Football Hall of Fame, Barron Hilton agreed after his general manager, Frank Leahy, picked the Chargers name when he purchased an AFL franchise for Los Angeles: "I liked it because they were yelling ‘charge’ and sounding the bugle at Dodger Stadium and at USC games."

=== San Diego (1961–2016) ===
In December 1960, the Chargers considered a move to Atlanta or Seattle, but ultimately moved to San Diego’s Balboa Stadium in January 1961, due to financial losses in Los Angeles. The city upgraded the stadium, increasing its seating capacity to 34,000. The Chargers’ defense was strong, recording forty-nine interceptions in their first season in San Diego. They won the AFL title against the Boston Patriots in 1963, but lost in the 1964 and 1965 championships to the Buffalo Bills.

In the late 1960s, the Chargers faced ownership changes and financial difficulties. In 1966, Hilton sold the team to a group of executives, including Eugene V. Klein and Sam Schulman. The team moved to San Diego Stadium in 1967 and continued to perform well, though not winning any championships. By 1970, they joined the NFL after the AFL-NFL merger. The team struggled in the early 1970s, with coaching changes and a decline in performance, finishing with a 2–11–1 record in 1973.

The Chargers hired Don Coryell as head coach in 1978, introducing the "Air Coryell" offense, a pass-heavy strategy that revitalized the team's performance With quarterback Dan Fouts, the Chargers led the league in passing yards from 1978 to 1983 and again in 1985. The team made four consecutive playoff appearances from 1979 to 1982, winning three AFC West division titles. Despite regular-season success, the Chargers faced challenges in the playoffs, including the "Epic in Miami" game in 1981.

The 1990s brought further changes, including the hiring of former Georgia Tech coach Bobby Ross as head coach in 1992. The Chargers lead by defensive players Junior Seau, Rodney Harrison and Leslie O'Neal won the AFC West title in 1992 and reached the Super Bowl for the first time in 1994, losing to the San Francisco 49ers 49–26.

Marty Schottenheimer was named as Chargers head coach before the 2002 season. He led the team to an 8–8 record in his first season at the helm. The team dropped to a 4–12 mark in the 2003 season. The Chargers drafted Eli Manning with the first overall pick in the 2004 NFL Draft. However, Manning did not want to play for the Chargers resulting in a trade with the Giants for quarterback Philip Rivers, who was their first round pick. The Chargers improved to a 12–4 record in the 2004 season. They won the AFC West. Their stint in the postseason was short as they dropped the Wild Card Round to the Jets. The Chargers went 9–7 but missed the postseason in the 2005 season. Rivers took over as starting quarterback in the 2006 season. Rivers went on to be the franchise quarterback for the Chargers. In the 2006 season, the Chargers won the division and went 14–2, the best record in franchise history lead by Philip Rivers, running back LaDainian Tomlinson, fullback Lorenzo Neal, tight end Antonio Gates and linebacker Shawne Merriman. The team was eliminated in the Divisional Round by the New England Patriots. Despite the historic season for the Chargers, the team fired Schottenheimer.

Before the 2007 season, the Chargers named former Oakland Raiders coach Norv Turner as head coach. In his first season at the helm, Turner led the Chargers to an AFC West title. The team defeated the Titans in the Wild Card Round and the Colts in the Divisional Round before falling to the Patriots in the AFC Championship. The team regressed to an 8–8 record in the 2008 season. However, they still won the division. They defeated the Colts in the Wild Card Round before falling to the Steelers in the Divisional Round. In the 2009 season, the Chargers went 13–3 and won the division again. The success was short-lived in the postseason with a 17–14 loss in the Divisional Round to the Jets. In the 2010 season, the Chargers went 9–7 but missed the postseason for the first time under Turner. Five of the Chargers' seven losses were within one possession. In the 2011 season, the team went 8–8 and missed the postseason. In the 2012 season, the team went 7–9, missed the postseason, and fired Turner after the season.

Before the 2013 season, the Chargers hired former Denver Broncos offensive coordinator Mike McCoy to be their new head coach. In the 2013 season, the Chargers went 9–7 and made the playoffs despite a 3rd-place finish in the AFC West. The Chargers defeated the Cincinnati Bengals 27–10 in the Wild Card Round before falling to the Denver Broncos 24–17 in the Divisional Round. In the 2014 season, the Chargers went 9–7 again but missed the postseason. In the 2015 season, the Chargers went 4–12. In the 2016 season, the Chargers went 5–11 and missed the post season for the third consecutive season. The team parted ways with Mike McCoy as head coach after the season. In 2017, the Chargers moved back to Los Angeles.

=== Return to Los Angeles (2017–present) ===
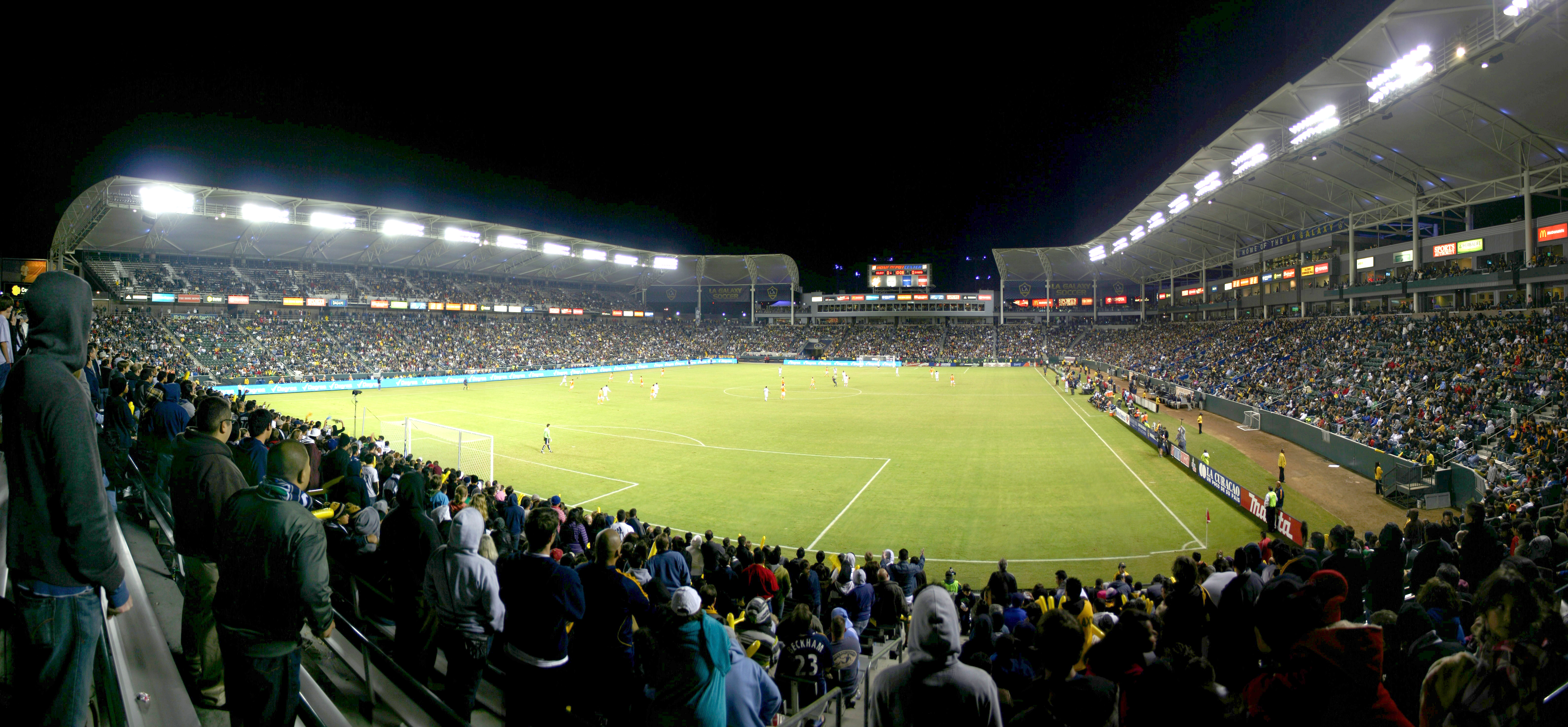
Dignity Health Sports Park, a soccer-specific stadium that seats 30,000, served as the Chargers' temporary home from 2017 until 2019.

Chargers owner Dean Spanos announced the move in a letter to the city of San Diego posted to the team's official site on January 12, 2017. The team, which would pay the NFL a $645 million relocation fee announced it would be returning to their birthplace in Los Angeles starting with the 2017 season at Dignity Health Sports Park in Carson, California, despite the stadium's 30,000 seating capacity being well below the 50,000 minimum that the NFL set for temporary homes. The home of Major League Soccer's LA Galaxy served as the Chargers' temporary home field until they joined the Rams at SoFi Stadium in Inglewood starting with the 2020 NFL season. The Chargers became the second former San Diego professional sports franchise to move to Los Angeles, after the Clippers in 1984.

One week after the move from San Diego to Los Angeles was announced, ESPN's Adam Schefter reported that the other NFL owners were "angered" by the decision, and that "the NFL wants the Chargers to move back, though nobody believes that possibility is realistic."

==== Anthony Lynn years (2017–2020) ====
On January 13, the Chargers fired defensive coordinator John Pagano. It took the team one week to find a replacement for Pagano, as they hired Gus Bradley on January 20. Bradley was formerly the head coach for the Jacksonville Jaguars, and before landing that head coaching job was the defensive coordinator for the Seattle Seahawks. The Chargers also announced they had hired Anthony Lynn to be their next head coach.

In their first game back in Los Angeles at StubHub Center included an announced attendance was just over 25,000, divided "around 50/50" between fans of the Chargers and the visiting Miami Dolphins. After the poor response, the NFL was reportedly considering ways to move the Chargers back to San Diego, although that possibility was considered unlikely. The league officially denied that such discussions were happening, as San Diego was stated not to have a usable stadium and that the Spanos family refuses to consider going back to the city; the league did acknowledge that a vote of the owners could change the situation. The team had a 9–7 record, but missed the playoffs for the fourth consecutive time.

After a 12–4 regular season record, the Chargers qualified for the 2018 playoffs. The team defeated the Baltimore Ravens in the Wild Card round, but lost to the eventual Super Bowl champion New England Patriots in the Divisional round. However, Chargers' attendance problems continued into their second season. For instance, there were so many fans of the visiting Kansas City Chiefs at the Chargers' 2018 home opener that USA Today remarked it "was essentially a Chiefs home game". In December 2018, a Los Angeles Times columnist asked if the Chargers would receive a parade in the city if they were to win the Super Bowl.

The team's struggles to draw fans reportedly led them to lower their initial revenue goal when they moved into the new stadium from $400 million to $150 million, and caused some owners to doubt the Chargers' viability in Los Angeles. Beyond low attendance, the Chargers receive only 18.75% of season ticket revenues through 2040, contributing to the reduced goal.

In the 2019 season, the Chargers had a poor 5–11 record, and were swept by their division. Rivers entered free agency and ended his long tenure as the Chargers' starting quarterback.

On September 13, 2020, Tyrod Taylor became the starting quarterback for the Chargers and the first new quarterback to start since Philip Rivers' starting debut on December 31, 2005. He led them to win 16–13 due to a missed field goal by the Bengals. On September 20, 2020, Taylor suffered a punctured lung while receiving a pain-killing injection, forcing rookie quarterback Justin Herbert to start. Herbert led the team to a narrow loss against the Chiefs, 23–20, in his first start. In week 13, the Chargers lost to the Patriots, 45–0, in the worst blowout loss in team history. The season concluded in a 38–21 win over the Chiefs. Justin Herbert broke multiple rookie records throughout the season, but despite his record-breaking season, the Chargers finished the season with a 7–9 record. At the conclusion of the 2020 season, the organization announced that Lynn was fired as head coach.

==== Brandon Staley years (2021–2023) ====
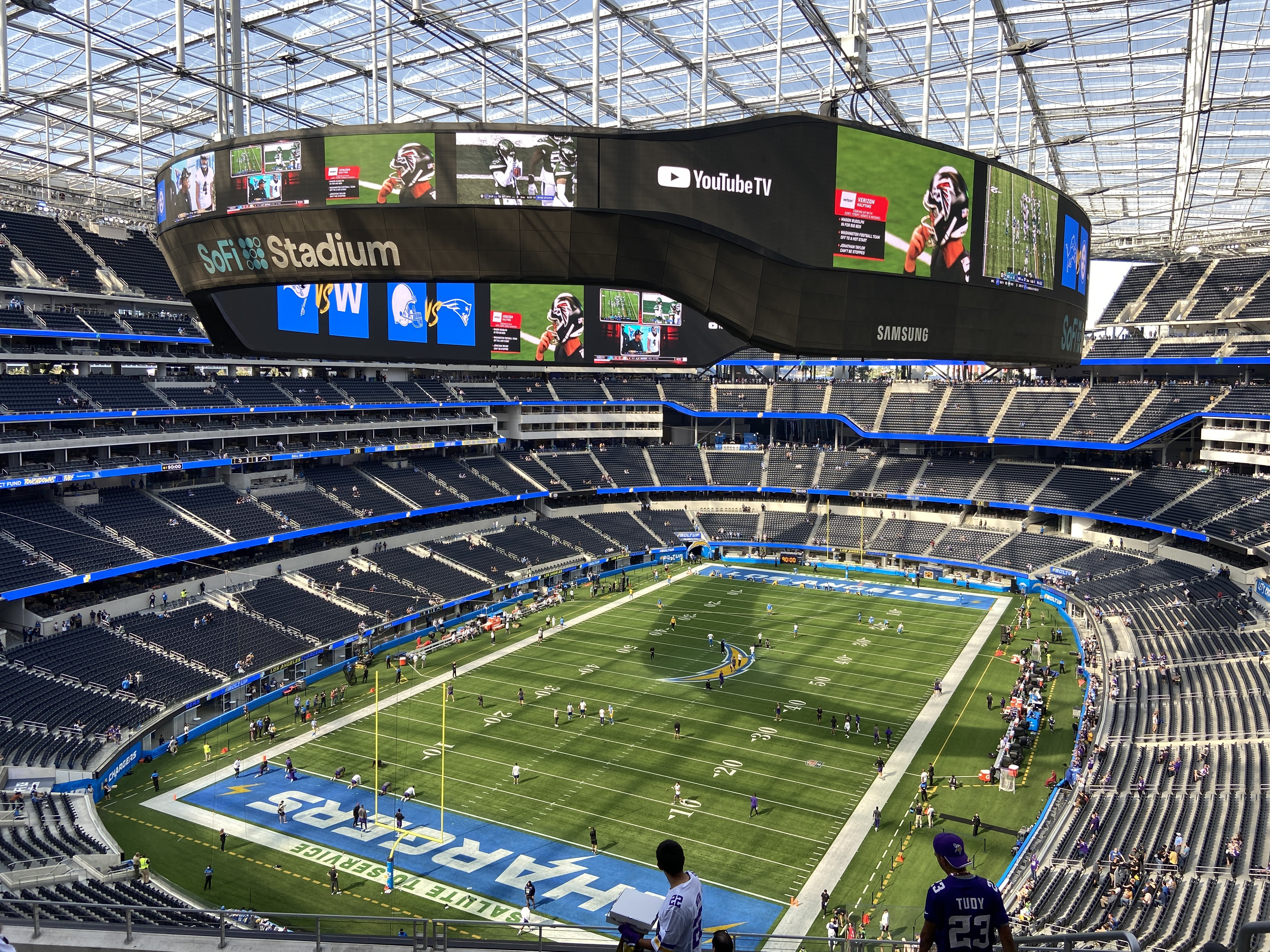
SoFi Stadium in 2021

The Chargers signed Rams defensive coordinator Brandon Staley to become their new head coach on January 17, 2021. Brandon Staley brought in Saints quarterbacks coach Joe Lombardi, grandson of Vince Lombardi, as the new offensive coordinator, and Renaldo Hill, Broncos defensive backs coach, as their new defensive coordinator.

In the 2021 season, the Chargers' record improved to 9–8 (with an extra 17th game added to the NFL regular season). Herbert broke numerous sophomore year records, but despite his and the rest of the team's efforts, the Chargers missed the playoffs in a week 18 win-or-tie-or-go-home overtime loss to the Raiders.

On February 3, 2022, the Chargers hired Vikings special teams coordinator Ryan Ficken. In 2022, the Chargers announced the location of a new headquarters in El Segundo, California. The Chargers finished the 2022 NFL season with a 10–7 record and the 5th seed in the AFC. They lost in the Wild Card round of the playoffs to the Jacksonville Jaguars after blowing a 27–0 lead in the game. Despite the playoff loss, the Chargers were alleviating their attendance issues, with their average attendance during the 2022 season being in the top third of the league for a second consecutive year.

On January 17, 2023, the Chargers fired offensive coordinator Joe Lombardi and quarterbacks coach Shane Day. The Chargers hired former Cowboys offensive coordinator Kellen Moore to be their new offensive coordinator on January 31. Chargers defensive coordinator Renaldo Hill unexpectedly left the team on February 20 to join the Miami Dolphins as their secondary coach and passing game coordinator, with the vacancy being filled by the Chargers defensive backs coach Derrick Ansley on the same day.

On December 15, 2023, head coach Brandon Staley and general manager Tom Telesco were fired, one day after a 63–21 primetime loss to the Las Vegas Raiders. The Chargers finished the remainder of the season with interim head coach Giff Smith. The Chargers finished out the 2023 with a 5–12 record.

==== Jim Harbaugh (2024–present) ====
The Chargers signed former Michigan football coach Jim Harbaugh on January 24, 2024. Harbaugh served as the coach for the San Francisco 49ers from 2011 to 2014. He went to Super Bowl XLVII with the 49ers where he lost to the Baltimore Ravens. He was the Michigan football coach from 2015 to 2024. There, he had a total record of 86–25 while reaching the college football playoffs three times, as well as winning the 2024 National Championship. Before his coaching career, Jim Harbaugh was a quarterback for the Chargers from 1999 to 2000.

The Chargers finished the 2024 season with an improved record of 11–6, securing the 5th seed in the AFC. They lost to the Houston Texans in the Wild Card round of the 2024–25 NFL playoffs. In 2025, the Chargers had a similar fate, again finishing 11-6 and losing in the wild card round of the 2025-26 NFL playoffs, though this time to the New England Patriots.

== Logos and uniforms ==
The Chargers' first logo, 1960; Alternate logo, 2018–present

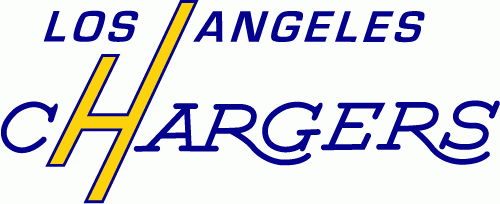
The Chargers' wordmark logo, 1960

Except for color changes along the way, the Chargers have essentially used the logo of an arc-shaped lightning bolt since the team debuted in 1960. During its period in the AFL, the club also used a shield logo that featured a horsehead, a lightning bolt, and the word "Chargers". The team brought the logo back for on-field design in the 2018 season.

From 1960 to 1973, the colors consisted of various shades of electric blue ("powder" blue, but technically called collegiate blue) or white jerseys, both with gold lightning bolts on the shoulders. The helmets were white and had both the arc-shaped lightning bolt logo, in gold or navy depending on the year, and the player's number. At first, the team wore white pants before switching to gold in 1966. In 1973, the numerals on the blue jerseys changed from white to gold.

In 1974, the sky blue was changed to dark royal blue. The helmet was also changed to dark blue and the players' numbers were removed. Additionally, the face masks became yellow, thus making them one of the first teams in the NFL (with the Kansas City Chiefs) to use a facemask color other than the then-predominant grey. From 1978 through 1983, the Chargers wore their white jerseys at home, coinciding with the hiring of coach Don Coryell – when Joe Gibbs, a Coryell assistant in 1979–80, became head coach of the Washington Redskins in 1981, he did the same, and white at home became a Redskins staple through 2007 – but Coryell switched the Chargers to their blue jerseys at home starting in 1984. With the exception of the 1991 season and other sporadic home games since, San Diego wears its blue jerseys at home. In 1985, the Chargers started using navy blue jerseys and returned to wearing white pants. The team's uniform design was next revamped in 1988. It featured an even darker shade of navy blue. The lightning bolts on the jerseys and helmets were white, with navy interior trim and gold outlining; the facemasks became navy blue. In 1990, the team started to wear navy pants with their white jerseys. From 1988 to 1991, the team displayed stripes down the pants rather than lightning bolts. The Chargers went with all-white combinations in 1997 and 2001, only to have the blue pants make a comeback. On October 27, 2003, the Chargers wore their navy pants with their navy jersey for a Monday Night Football game versus the Miami Dolphins that was played at Sun Devil Stadium, then the home of the Arizona Cardinals, due to wildfires in southern California. This was the only game in which the Chargers had worn the all-dark combination until the uniform change in 2020.

From the late 1980s to 2000, the Chargers wore white at home during some preseason games and dark for regular season games. In 2001, the Chargers started wearing their dark uniforms for preseason games and white uniforms in September home games due to the heat before switching back to dark in October.

In 1994, as part of the NFL's 75th season throwback uniform program, the Chargers wore uniforms based on their early 1960s look a total of four times (two each for their road whites and home powder blues). In 2000, the powder blue throwbacks were brought back for a Week 9 matchup against the Raiders, and became a regular alternate uniform worn once or twice a season from 2002 through 2006. Many Chargers fans and NFL fans in general clamored for the return of the powder blues full-time.

In 2002, the Chargers scrapped the altogether idea of the helmet side profile being used as the team logo, to unveil what's commonly known simply as the bolt logo among Los Angeles and San Diego. The iconic emblem depicted a white leaping thunder bolt curved in the shape of an arch with a blue and thicker yellow outline; until 2007 when they reverted to the yellow thunderbolt used on the helmets in 1976.

The bolt sparked (pun intended) a playful controversy over whether "Charger" refers to a shockwave of lightning, as suggested by the logo, or a charging war horse, the literal definition of one in this sense. While the original logo featured a cavalry stallion, opinions are divided on whether it now implies a thunder bolt due to the change, or if the logo simply evolved into one for looks because Charger horses "charge".

In March 2007, the Chargers unveiled their first uniform redesign since 1988, on the team's official website. The team formally unveiled this new uniform set, which mixes old and new styles, in a private team-only event. Navy blue remains the primary color on the home jersey, but the familiar lightning bolt was reverted to gold, and now has navy outlining and powder blue interior trim. The latter color is a nod to the 1960s uniforms. The redesigned lightning bolt was moved to the sides of the shoulders from the top, and includes a new numbering font and word mark in white, with gold outlining and powder blue interior trim. The pants also have a redesigned lightning bolt in gold, with powder blue trim on a navy stripe. Additionally, the team pays tribute to other uniform features from their history by wearing a metallic white helmet, with a navy face mask, the newly revamped bolt in gold with navy and powder blue trim, and white pants. The road white jerseys with navy pants, as well as the alternate powder blue jerseys with white pants, were also redesigned with the new scheme.

From 2007 to 2018, the Chargers wore the alternate powder blue jerseys twice per season. The alternate powder blue jerseys were also worn in a playoff game against the Indianapolis Colts in 2008.

In 2009, in honor of their 50th anniversary as one of the eight original AFL teams, the Chargers once again wore their 1963 throwback uniforms for three games, wearing their powder blues on the road in Oakland and at home against Denver, and their white uniforms in Kansas City.

For the 2013 season, the Chargers made minor tweaks to their current uniforms. These include a two-tone nameplate (gold with powder blue trim on home jersey, navy with gold trim on away jersey, and white with navy trim on alternate jersey), collars matching the color of the jersey, and the addition of a gold stripe on the socks.

First Chargers wordmark of the second Los Angeles era 2017–2019

On January 12, 2017, with the announcement that the Chargers were moving to Los Angeles, the team unveiled a new alternate logo incorporating the letters "LA" with a lightning bolt shooting through the crossbar of the A. The logo was immediately and widely criticized for its resemblance to the Los Angeles Dodgers logo. The team tried to defuse the controversy by changing the color scheme of the new logo before scrapping it altogether after two days.

The team officially announced on April 16, 2019, that it would wear its powder blue jerseys, the same uniforms they wore during their inaugural season in 1960 while in Los Angeles, as its primary home uniform beginning with the 2019 NFL season. The club also announced that the facemask color would change from navy blue to gold, which was previously worn when the team wore its royal blue NFL Color Rush uniforms.

On March 24, 2020, the team announced new logos and upcoming new uniforms for the team. Navy blue was no longer a Chargers-used color and was removed from all logos and clothes. The Chargers unveiled a new variation of the thunderbolt with only a powder blue outline and faint white outline for visibility on blue backgrounds. The most significant alteration to the thunderbolt was lessening the curve which made the logo less circular-looking as it looked to many, and rather leaping across something. The Chargers debuted a new script logo featuring powder blue and gold and lightning bolt shooting from the A in Chargers. On April 21, 2020, the team unveiled their new uniforms. Powder blue returned as the primary color. The shoulder bolts were repositioned to go over the shoulders again, in gold with a simple outline contrasting with the jersey's color. TV numbers were removed from the sleeves and placed on the helmets, which remained white with gold bolts outlined in powder blue. Pants options included white with gold bolts or gold with white bolts. The royal blue and navy alternate uniforms were also updated to the new template, with the navy uniform now featuring navy bolts outlined in gold on the helmet, jersey, and pants. For the 2024 season, the Chargers shelved the royal alternates, wearing the navy set just once.

On July 15, 2025, the Chargers unveiled an updated version of their all-navy alternate uniform reflecting that of the San Diego/1992 era. Nicknamed the "Super Chargers" uniform, this set featured numbers and stylized thunderbolts in white with navy and gold trim, as well as a new navy helmet which paid homage to the navy helmets they wore from 1985 to 2006. They also unveiled an all-gold alternate uniform, nicknamed the "Charger Power" uniform, which mirrors the build of their primary white and powder blue uniforms. These are paired with either powder blue or gold socks. In addition, the Chargers added a powder blue pants option which can be worn with either the white or powder blue jersey.

Following the release of the alternate uniforms and pants combinations, the standard uniform combinations would be powder blue-on-yellow at home and white on white as the visitors.

== Rivalries ==
=== Division ===
==== Oakland/Los Angeles/Las Vegas Raiders ====
The Chargers–Raiders rivalry dates to the 1963 season, when the Raiders defeated the heavily favored Chargers twice, both come-from-behind fourth quarter victories. One of the most memorable games between these teams was the "Holy Roller" game in 1978, in which the Raiders intentionally fumbled in order to score a touchdown. This somewhat controversial play resulted in a rule change the following season. On November 22, 1982, the Raiders hosted their first Monday Night football game in Los Angeles against the Chargers. The Chargers led the game in the 1st half 24–0 until the Raiders scored 28 unanswered points in the second half to win 28–24. On January 10, 2022, the Raiders defeated the Chargers in overtime, 35–32. The winning field goal was unnecessary for the Raiders' playoff chances, and if the game had ended in a tie, both teams would have made the playoffs. With the field goal, the Chargers were eliminated. The Raiders lead the series 69–60–2 as of the end of the 2024 season, including having won the only playoff game between the two teams, the 1980 AFC Championship game.

The Chargers defeated the Raiders 31–14 despite a left-hand injury to Justin Herbert, who returned after missing a series. Running back Kamani Vidal contributed a 59-yard running touchdown, and the defence was effective against the Raiders' run game. While coaching decisions were questioned, Jim Harbaugh's run-oriented game was successful at the end, keeping the Chargers playoff hopes alive.

==== Kansas City Chiefs ====
As of the 2024 season, the Kansas City Chiefs lead 70–58–1, but the Chargers won the only playoff meeting between the two teams, a 1992 AFC wild card game.

==== Denver Broncos ====
Broncos lead 75–55–1 as of the end of the 2024 season, including having won the only playoff meeting between the two teams, a 2013 AFC Divisional game.

=== Conference ===
==== Los Angeles Rams ====
Initially, the Los Angeles Raiders and Rams were considered to be competing in the "Battle of Los Angeles" during the Raiders' tenure in Los Angeles from 1982 to 1994. However, the rivalry ended as the Rams moved to St. Louis and the Raiders returned to Oakland in the mid-1990s. The Raiders unsuccessfully attempted to move back to Los Angeles in 2015 after a failed joint stadium project with the then-San Diego Chargers. The intercity rivalry was revived only with the Chargers' move from San Diego in 2016, following the Rams' return to Los Angeles in 2016. Hostility erupted between the two clubs during a 2017 joint scrimmage at the Rams' training camp in Irvine, California. Rams cornerback Nickell Robey-Coleman and Chargers receiver Keenan Allen initiated an altercation and multiple players rushed into the skirmish, creating an uproar from the crowd. After the hiring of coach Sean McVay in 2017, the Rams managed to win back-to-back division titles, including an appearance in Super Bowl LIII during McVay's second season as head coach. The Chargers experienced their own playoff success by boasting a 12–4 record in 2018 and making an appearance in the 2018 AFC divisional round but lost to the New England Patriots. The Rams won the first regular season matchup in Los Angeles between the two teams in Week 3 of the 2018 season. The Chargers would win the next meeting in Week 17 of the 2022 season, the first matchup between the two teams at their new stadium. As of the 2023 season, the Rams lead the all-time series 7–6.

The Chargers and Rams do have an extensive history of playing each other in the preseason, going back to the first AFL-NFL interleague preseason games in 1967. Until the Rams' departure to St. Louis, the Chargers and Rams played in the preseason all but four years (1975, 1976, 1985, and 1989) in that period. The preseason series continued with the Rams in St. Louis through 2008, playing nine times out of fourteen seasons. The teams would not meet in the preseason again until 2017, when both teams were back in Los Angeles, and would resume the preseason series annually in 2021 (with the 2020 game, along with all preseason games, being cancelled due to the COVID-19 pandemic).

== Season-by-season record ==
The table below shows the five most recent NFL regular season records along with their respective finish in the NFL playoffs. The Los Angeles Chargers appeared in the postseason twice in the five last seasons. Recent notable honors with current members of the Los Angeles Chargers include NFL Rookie of the Year in 2016 for Joey Bosa (Defensive) and in 2020 for Justin Herbert (Offensive) along with NFL Comeback Player of the Year for Keenan Allen in 2017.

Note: GP = Games played, W = Wins, L = Losses, W–L% = Winning percentage

Season	GP	W	L	W–L%	Finish	Playoffs
2020	16	7	9	.438	3rd, AFC West	did not qualify
2021	17	9	8	.529	3rd, AFC West	did not qualify
2022	17	10	7	.588	2nd, AFC West	Lost in Wild Card, 31–30 (Jaguars)
2023	17	5	12	.294	4th, AFC West	did not qualify
2024	17	11	6	.647	2nd, AFC West	Lost in Wild Card, 32–12 (Texans)
2025	17	11	6	.647	2nd, AFC West	Lost in Wild Card, 16–3 (Patriots)

== Players of note ==
=== Current roster ===
Los Angeles Chargers roster
Quarterbacks (QB): 10 Justin Herbert; 7 DJ Uiagalelei; Running backs (RB): 8 Omarion Hampton; 44 Scott Matlock FB; 34 Keaton Mitchell; 28 Kimani Vidal; Wide receivers (WR): 12 Derius Davis RS; 9 Tre Harris; 1 Quentin Johnston; 84 KeAndre Lambert-Smith; 15 Ladd McConkey; 89 Brenen Thompson; 82 Theo Wease Jr.; Tight ends (TE): 86 Oronde Gadsden II; 88 Charlie Kolar; 83 David Njoku	Offensive linemen (OL): 76 Joe Alt T; 74 Kayode Awosika G; 77 Travis Burke T; 73 Alex Harkey T; 66 Jake Slaughter C; 60 Jacob Spomer C; 69 Cole Strange G; 65 Logan Taylor G; Defensive linemen (DL): 91 Nick Barrett; 99 Jamaree Caldwell; 92 Justin Eboigbe; 93 Teair Tart; 94 Dalvin Tomlinson	Linebackers (LB): 48 Bud Dupree OLB; 43 Troy Dye ILB; 0 Daiyan Henley ILB; 52 Khalil Mack OLB; 90 Akheem Mesidor OLB; 50 Caleb Murphy OLB; 6 Denzel Perryman LB; 53 Del'Shawn Phillips ILB; 45 Tuli Tuipulotu OLB; 58 Marlowe Wax ILB; Defensive backs (DB): 20 Cam Hart CB; 26 Donte Jackson CB; 23 Tony Jefferson S; 33 Deane Leonard CB; 27 R. J. Mickens S; 2 Elijah Molden S; 24 Rodney Shelley CB; 22 Genesis Smith S; 4 Tarheeb Still CB; 37 Isas Waxter CB; 32 Kendall Williamson S; Special teams (ST): 11 Cameron Dicker K; 47 Josh Harris LS; 16 J. K. Scott P	Practice squad: 96 Myles Adams DE; 36 Jalyn Armour-Davis CB; 57 Lander Barton LB; 13 Jake Browning QB; 61 Daniel Brunskill T; 51 Andre Carter II OLB; 41 Zion Childress CB; 25 Junior Colson LB; 29 Kaiir Elam CB; 39 Luke Grimm WR; 81 Patrick Herbert TE; 35 Amar Johnson RB; 68 Josh Kaltenberger C; 38 Kyu Blu Kelly CB; 31 Tejhaun Palmer WR; 78 Laekin Vakalahi T (IPP); 64 Terry Webb DT; Reserve: 63 Tyler Biadasz C (IR); 30 Alec Ingold FB (IR); 3 Derwin James S (IR); 5 Trey Lance QB (IR); 75 Trevor Penning G (IR); 79 Trey Pipkins T (IR/DFR); 70 Rashawn Slater T (IR); 71 Branson Taylor G (IR); 67 Isaiah World T (NF-Inj.) 53 active, 16 practice squad (1 IPP), 9 reserve As of November 16, 2026. Rookies in italics.; Roster; Depth chart; Transactions

=== Retired numbers ===
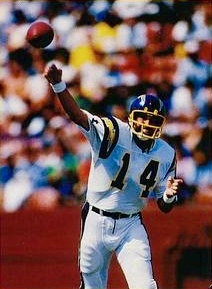
Hall of Fame QB Dan Fouts

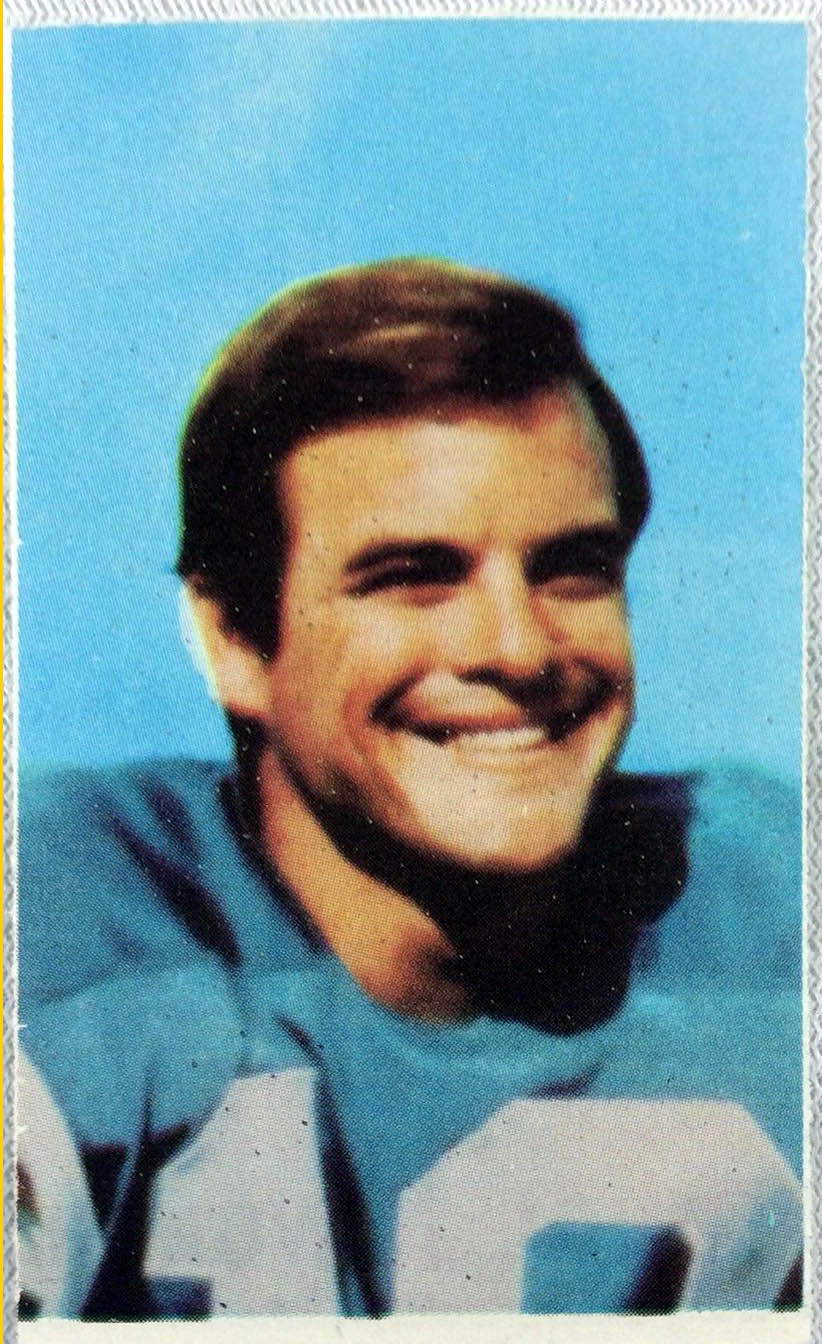
Hall of Fame WR Lance Alworth

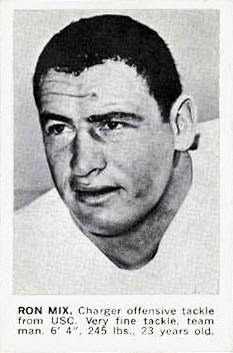
Hall of Fame OT Ron Mix

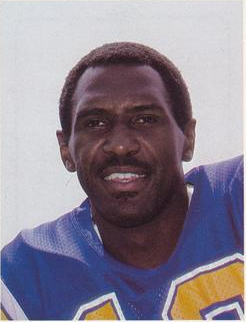
Hall of Fame WR Charlie Joiner

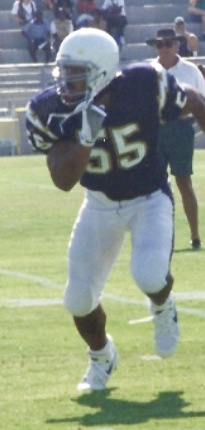
Hall of Fame LB Junior Seau

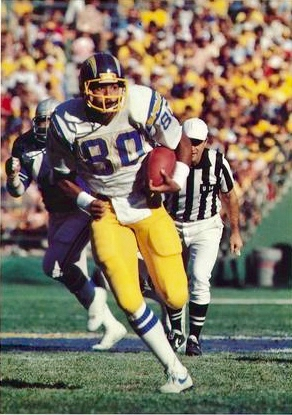
Hall of Fame TE Kellen Winslow

The Chargers currently have six retired numbers: #14 of Dan Fouts, #18 of Charlie Joiner, #19 of Lance Alworth, #21 of LaDainian Tomlinson, #55 of Junior Seau and #80 of Kellen Winslow. As of 2010, the Chargers' policy was to have the Chargers Hall of Fame committee evaluate candidates for a player's number to retire after the player has retired from the league after five years, Seau was the only exception to this policy. The committee consists of Chargers Executive Vice President Alex Spanos, Chargers public relations director Bill Johnston, San Diego Hall of Champions founder Bob Breitbard, and the presidents of the San Diego Sports Commission and the Chargers Backers Fan Club. There are few recognized guidelines in sports regarding retiring numbers, and the NFL has no specific league policy. "You have to have enough numbers for players to wear", said NFL spokesman Greg Aiello. The Chargers have rarely retired numbers. The San Diego Union-Tribune wrote, "The [Chargers] tend to honor their heritage haphazardly."

Los Angeles Chargers retired numbers
No.	Player	Position	Tenure	Retired
14	Dan Fouts	QB	1973–1987	March 24, 1988
18	Charlie Joiner	WR	1976–1986	September 10, 2023
19	Lance Alworth	WR	1962–1970	November 20, 2005
21	LaDainian Tomlinson	RB	2001–2009	November 21, 2015
55	Junior Seau	LB	1990–2002	May 11, 2012
80	Kellen Winslow	TE	1979–1987	September 10, 2023

=== Pro Football Hall of Famers ===
Table key
*	Member of the Chargers Hall of Fame
†	Member of the Chargers Hall of Fame and number retired by Chargers

San Diego / Los Angeles Chargers Hall of Famers
Players
Name	No.	Position	Tenure	Inducted
Lance Alworth †	19	WR	1962–1970	1978
Ron Mix *	74	OT	1960–1969	1979
Johnny Unitas	19	QB	1973	1979
Deacon Jones	75	DE	1972–1973	1980
John Mackey	89	TE	1972	1992
Dan Fouts †	14	QB	1973–1987	1993
Larry Little	72	G	1967–1968	1993
Kellen Winslow †	80	TE	1979–1987	1995
Charlie Joiner †	18	WR	1976–1986	1996
Fred Dean *	71	DE	1975–1981	2008
Junior Seau †	55	LB	1990–2002	2015
LaDainian Tomlinson †	21	RB	2001–2009	2017
Antonio Gates*	85	TE	2003–2018	2025
Drew Brees	9	QB	2001–2005	2026
Coaches & front office staff
Name		Position	Tenure	Inducted
Sid Gillman *		Head coach	1960–1971	1983
Bobby Beathard *		General manager	1990–2000	2018
Don Coryell *		Head coach	1978–1986	2023

=== Chargers Hall of Fame ===
The Chargers created their Hall of Fame in 1976. The members of the Hall of Fame are honored at the Chargers Ring of Honor, founded in 2000 and viewable above the visiting team's sideline of Qualcomm Stadium on the press level. Eligible candidates must have been retired for at least four seasons. Selections are made by a five-member committee chaired by Dean Spanos, Chargers vice-chairman. As of 1992, other committee members included Bob Breitbard, founder of the San Diego Hall of Champions; Ron Fowler, president of the Greater San Diego Sports Association; Jane Rappoport, president of the Charger Backers; and Bill Johnston, the team's director of public relations. The Chargers in 2012 allowed fans to vote for the newest member.

=== 50th Anniversary Team ===
The Chargers announced their 50th Anniversary Team in 2009 to honor the top players and coaches in the team's history. The Chargers were founded in 1959. The team included 53 players and coaches selected from 103 nominees. The Chargers originally stated that only 50 members would be selected. Online voting by fans accounted for 50% of the voting results; votes from Chargers Hall of Famers and five members of the local media made up for the other 50%. Over 400,000 votes were cast online. Dan Fouts and LaDainian Tomlinson received the first and second most votes, respectively. The team features 7 Pro Football Hall of Fame members and 11 players that were active on the 2009 Chargers team.

=== San Diego Hall of Champions ===
Alworth, Mix, Hadl, Joiner, Coryell, Gillman, Garrison, Fouts, White, Winslow, Faison, Benirschke, Lincoln, Washington, Humphries, Ladd and Wilkerson are also members of the San Diego Hall of Champions, which is open to athletes from the San Diego area as well as those who played for San Diego-based professional and collegiate teams.

== Staff ==
=== Current staff ===
Los Angeles Chargers staff
Front office: Chairman/owner – Dean Spanos; Vice chairman/owner – Michael Spanos; President of business operations – A. G. Spanos; President of football operations – John Spanos; Executive vice president/COO – Jeanne Bonk; Executive vice president of football administration/player finance – Ed McGuire; General manager – Joe Hortiz; Assistant general manager – Chad Alexander; Director of player personnel strategy – Corey Krawiec; Director of pro scouting – Dennis Abraham; Senior director of pro personnel – Louis Clark; Assistant director of pro scouting – Tyler Lyon; Director of football administration – Katie Sylvan; Head coaches: Head coach – Jim Harbaugh; Offensive coaches: Offensive coordinator – Mike McDaniel; Passing game coordinator/quarterbacks – Shane Day; Running backs – Max McCaffrey; Wide receivers – Sanjay Lal; Assistant wide receivers/special teams – Josh Hammond; Tight ends – Chandler Henley; Offensive line – Butch Barry; Assistant offensive line – Nick Hardwick; Passing game specialist – Adam Gase; Offensive assistant – Kirk Campbell; Offensive assistant – Rob Everett	Defensive coaches: Defensive coordinator – Chris O'Leary; Run game coordinator/defensive line – Mike Elston; Assistant defensive line – Julian Campenni; Linebackers – Sean Spence; Outside linebackers – Dylan Roney; Assistant outside linebackers – Denzel Martin; Passing game coordinator/defensive backs – Steve Clinkscale; Safeties – Adam Fuller; Run game specialist – Mike Hiestand; Special teams: Special teams coordinator – Ryan Ficken; Assistant special teams – Chris Gould; Strength and conditioning: Executive director of player performance – Ben Herbert; Head of strength and conditioning – Jonathan Brooks; Head of strength and conditioning – Devin Woodhouse; Director of performance analytics – Ben Rabe; Performance analyst – Lincoln Dewolf; → Coaching staff → Front office → More NFL staffs

== Radio and television ==
The Chargers' flagship radio station is KYSR-FM Alt 98.7 in Los Angeles, with daily coverage and special programming on KLAC-AM 570 LA Sports Play-by-play voice Matt "Money" Smith & NFL Network analyst Daniel Jeremiah comprise the broadcast team. KYSR-FM's iHeartMedia Los Angeles sister-station KFI AM 640 served as the previous flagship station for the team since the Chargers’ return to Los Angeles from 2017 to 2019. Past Chargers radio broadcasters have included Josh Lewin, Ralph Lawler, Stu Nahan, Tom Kelly, Lee "Hacksaw" Hamilton, Dan Rowe, Ted Leitner, and Hank Bauer. Bauer served seventeen seasons (1998–2014) as the radio color analyst; however, the Chargers and then-flagship KIOZ decided not to renew his contract, and was replaced by Conway starting with the 2015 season. As of 2014, the Chargers also stream their radio broadcasts on their official mobile application (through iOS and Android devices) as well as on their website.

As of the 2020 season, Chargers preseason games will be broadcast by KCBS-TV; likewise, in the former San Diego market, KFMB is the local affiliate. As per the NFL's television deals, KCBS also broadcasts CBS coverage of most Chargers regular season games against AFC teams.

Dennis Packer, the public address announcer of all USC football games at the Los Angeles Memorial Coliseum, serves as the public address announcer of all Chargers home games at SoFi Stadium. Packer replaced legendary P.A. announcer Bruce Binkowski, who went on to become the executive director of the Holiday and Poinsettia Bowl games, which were played at their former home, now-defunct SDCCU Stadium. The Holiday Bowl was played in 2020 & 2021 at Dignity Health Sports Park and had returned to Snapdragon Stadium in 2022. Poinsettia Bowl went defunct in 2016.

With the Chargers' return to Los Angeles in 2017, the team became a beneficiary of league scheduling policies. Both the Chargers and the Los Angeles Rams share the Los Angeles market, which is on the West Coast of the United States. This means that the Chargers cannot play home games, road division games against the Denver Broncos or Las Vegas Raiders, or interconference road games against the NFC West (in seasons that the AFC West and NFC West meet in interconference play) in the early 10:00 a.m. Pacific time slot. In addition, they cannot play interconference home games at the same time or network as the Rams. As a result, both teams generally will have more limited scheduling options, and will also benefit by receiving more prime-time games than usual (click here for further information). Thus, regardless of the previous season's record, the Chargers will receive a disproportionate number of Sunday Night, Monday Night and/or Thursday Night games, compared to the rest of the league. Additionally, if the Chargers and Rams are both playing at the same time on Sunday afternoons on a certain network (for instance, a Rams road game against an AFC opponent at the same time as a Charger home game with an NFC opponent with both on Fox, or the reverse where the Rams are on the road against an AFC opponent and the Chargers are at home against an AFC opponent on CBS), in the Los Angeles market, Fox and CBS have authorization to carry the extra game on their secondary sister stations; Fox games air on KCOP-TV, while CBS games are aired on KCAL-TV. In 2020, the Chargers signed a multi-year preseason TV deal with KCBS-TV and KCAL-TV and will have a weekly show with the latest team news, replacing KABC-TV after three seasons (2017, 2018 and 2019) of televising Chargers preseason football.

=== Radio affiliates ===
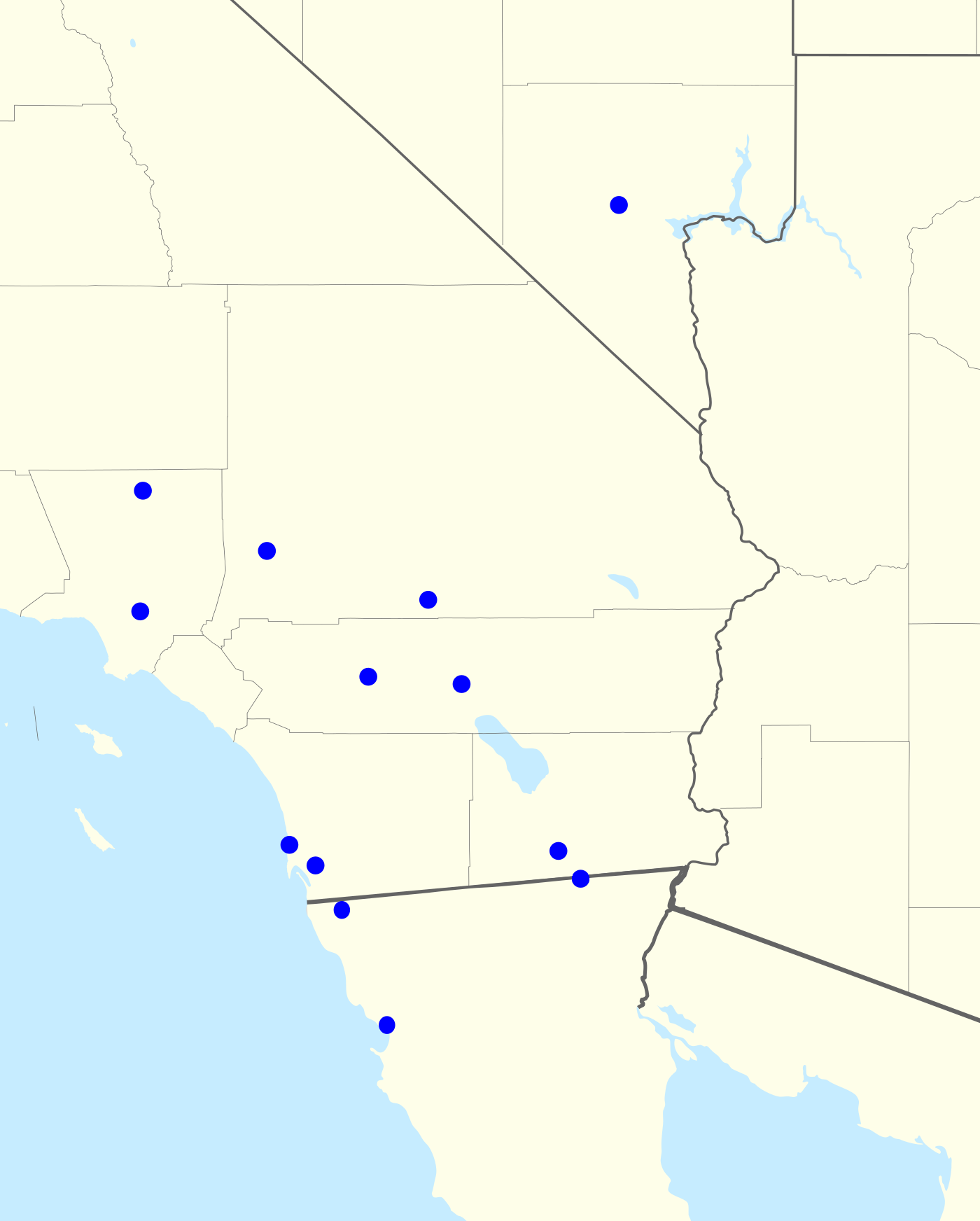
Map of radio affiliates

=== English stations ===
==== California ====
City	Call Sign	Frequency
Los Angeles	KYSR/KSRY	98.7/103.1 FM (Pre-Game [first two-hours], Full Game Coverage and 'Chargers Talk' Post-Game)
Los Angeles	KYSR	98.7 HD2 (HD radio simulcast of KLAC, will carry select games)
Los Angeles	KLAC	570 AM (Secondary affiliate to KYSR, will carry select games)
San Diego	KGB-FM	101.5 FM
San Diego	KGB	760 AM
Temecula/Inland Empire	KATY-FM	101.3 FM
Yucca Valley	KNWH	1250 AM/103.7 FM
Palm Springs	KNWQ	1140 AM/94.3 FM
Coachella	KNWZ	970 AM/104.7 FM
Palmdale/Lancaster	KAVL	610 AM
Victorville/Hesperia	KMPS	910 AM
Imperial Valley	KXO-FM	107.5 FM

=== Spanish stations ===
==== California ====
City	Call Sign	Frequency
Los Angeles/Orange County	KLXM/KLXO	103.9 FM/98.3 FM
Inland Empire	KLXO	98.3 FM
San Diego/Tijuana, Mexico	XEMO-AM	860 AM

==== Mexico ====
City	Call Sign	Frequency
Mexicali	XEHG	1370 AM
Ensenada	XHEPF-FM	89.1 FM

== Theme song ==
The Chargers' fight song, "San Diego Super Chargers", was recorded in 1979 at the height of the team's success with Air Coryell, and has a distinctly disco sound. The team under then-new owner Alex Spanos replaced the song in 1989 with a non-disco cover version, but the original version was revived in 2002. The team played this song at home games after Chargers scores and victories until they departed San Diego.

== See also ==
- Sports in Los Angeles

Preceded by Dallas Texans	AFL champions San Diego Chargers; 1963	Succeeded by Buffalo Bills
