= Tarheeb Still =

American football player (born 2002)

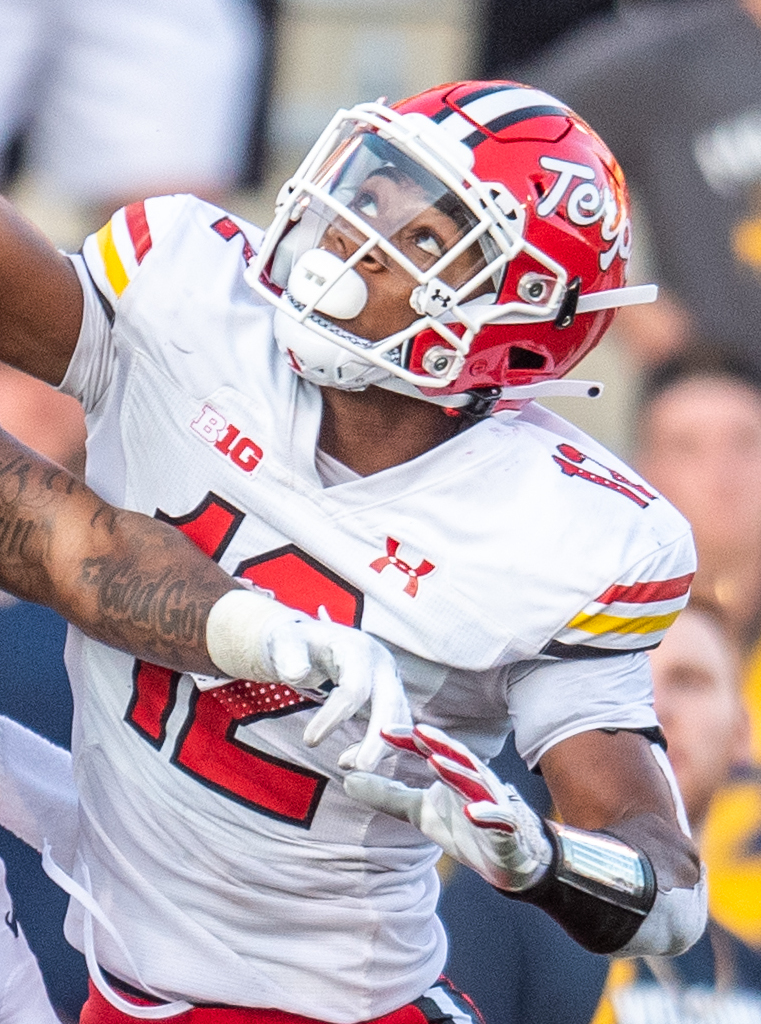
- Still with Maryland in 2021

No. 4 – Los Angeles Chargers
- Positions: Cornerback, punt returner
- Roster status: Active

Personal information
- Born: June 9, 2002 (age 24); Sicklerville, New Jersey, U.S.
- Listed height: 6 ft 1 in (1.85 m)
- Listed weight: 196 lb (89 kg)

Career information
- High school: Timber Creek (Sicklerville)
- College: Maryland (2020–2023)
- NFL draft: 2024: 5th round, 137th overall pick

Career history
- Los Angeles Chargers (2024–present)

Awards and highlights
- Second-team All-Big Ten (2022); Third-team All-Big Ten (2023)

Career NFL statistics as of Week 5, 2026
- Total tackles: 129
- Sacks: 0.5
- Forced fumbles: 1
- Pass deflections: 20
- Interceptions: 4
- Defensive touchdowns: 1
- Stats at Pro Football Reference

Tarheeb Still (tar-HEEB; born June 9, 2002) is an American professional football cornerback and punt returner for the Los Angeles Chargers of the National Football League (NFL). He played college football for the Maryland Terrapins.

== Early life ==
Still grew up in Sicklerville, New Jersey, and attended Timber Creek Regional High School, where he lettered in football, basketball and track & field. During his high school football career, he was named the Defensive Back MVP at the 2019 Nike Football Opening Regional-New Jersey and broke the school-wide record for the most receiving yards in a season with 71 catches for 1,541 yards. He was rated a three-star recruit and committed to play college football at Maryland over offers from West Virginia, Baylor, NC State, Wake Forest, Virginia Tech, Purdue, UCF, Duke, North Carolina, Pittsburgh and Syracuse.

== College career ==
During Still's true freshman season in 2020, he played in and started all four games at cornerback and finished the season with 18 solo tackles, two assisted tackles and 20 total tackles. During the 2021 season, he played in and started all 13 games at cornerback and finished the season with 40 solo tackles, 15 assisted tackles, 55 total tackles, three tackles for loss for 13 yards, two sacks, 11 pass breakups, two fumble recoveries and a touchdown. In the 2021 Pinstripe Bowl, Still returned a punt from Virginia Tech for a touchdown, which was Maryland's first points of the game.

During the 2022 season, he appeared in 12 games and started 10 of them. He finished the season with 35 solo tackles, 10 assisted tackles, 45 total tackles, four tackles for loss for 22 yards, an interception and one pass breakup. He was also named on the Paul Hornung Award Watch List. In the 2023 season he had 32 solo tackles, 2 pass deflections, and 5 interceptions. The interceptions were a career high for Still. On December 4, Still declared for the 2024 NFL draft.

== Professional career ==
Pre-draft measurables
Height	Weight	Arm length	Hand span	Wingspan	40-yard dash	10-yard split	20-yard split	20-yard shuttle	Vertical jump	Broad jump
5 ft 11 5/8 in (1.82 m)	189 lb (86 kg)	29 5/8 in (0.75 m)	9 1/8 in (0.23 m)	6 ft 1 1/8 in (1.86 m)	4.49 s	1.54 s	2.62 s	4.19 s	38.0 in (0.97 m)	10 ft 0 in (3.05 m)
All values from NFL Combine/Pro Day

Still was drafted 137th overall in the fifth round of the 2024 NFL Draft by the Los Angeles Chargers.

Against the Atlanta Falcons on December 1, 2024, Still recorded two interceptions including one that he took for a 61–yard touchdown, the first of his career.

== NFL career statistics ==
Legend
**Bold**	Career high

=== Regular season ===
Year	Team	Games		Tackles					Interceptions						Punt returns					Fumbles				
Year	Team	GP	GS	Cmb	Solo	Ast	Sck	TFL	Int	Yds	Avg	Lng	TD	PD	Ret	Yds	Avg	Lng	TD	FF	Fum	FR	Yds	TD
2024	LAC	14	12	**62**	**45**	**17**	**0.5**	1	**4**	**85**	**21.3**	**61**	**1**	**10**	0	0	0.0	0	0	0	0	0	0	0
2025	LAC	**15**	**13**	53	37	16	0.0	**5**	0	0	0.0	0	0	7	**5**	**36**	**7.2**	**11**	0	0	0	0	0	0
2026	LAC	5	4	14	8	6	0.0	0	0	0	0.0	0	0	3	0	0	0	0	0	1	0	0	0	0
Career		34	29	129	90	39	0.5	6	4	85	21.3	61	1	20	5	36	7.2	11	0	1	0	0	0	0

=== Postseason ===
Year	Team	Games		Tackles					Interceptions						Fumbles				
Year	Team	GP	GS	Cmb	Solo	Ast	Sck	TFL	Int	Yds	Avg	Lng	TD	PD	FF	Fum	FR	Yds	TD
2024	LAC	**1**	0	3	3	0	0.0	0	0	0	0.0	0	0	0	0	0	0	0	0
2025	LAC	**1**	**1**	**8**	**4**	**4**	0.0	0	0	0	0.0	0	0	0	0	0	0	0	0
Career		2	1	11	7	4	0.0	0	0	0	0.0	0	0	0	0	0	0	0	0
