= Chad Alexander =

American football executive

Los Angeles Chargers
- Title: Assistant general manager

Career information
- College: Wake Forest

Career history
- Baltimore Ravens (1999–2002) Pro Personnel assistant; Baltimore Ravens (2003–2008) Scout; Baltimore Ravens (2009–2018) Assistant Director of Player Personnel; New York Jets (2019–2023) Director of Player Personnel; Los Angeles Chargers (2024–present) Assistant General Manager

Awards and highlights
- 2× Super Bowl champion (XXXV, XLVII)

Chad Alexander is an American professional football executive and former college football player who is the Assistant General Manager for the Los Angeles Chargers of the National Football League (NFL). He previously spent 20 seasons with the Baltimore Ravens and five seasons as the New York Jets Director of Player Personnel.

== Executive career ==
=== Baltimore Ravens ===
In 1999, Alexander began his career as a pro personnel assistant for the Baltimore Ravens. In 2003, he was promoted to a scout under general manager Ozzie Newsome. In 2009, Alexander was promoted to assistant director of player personnel.

=== New York Jets ===
In 2019, Alexander was hired by the New York Jets as their director of player personnel under general manager Joe Douglas.

=== Los Angeles Chargers ===
In 2024, Alexander was hired by the Los Angeles Chargers as their assistant general manager under general manager Joe Hortiz.

== Personal life ==
Alexander is the son of former college and NFL coach Hubbard “Axe” Alexander, who won two national championships with the Miami Hurricanes and three Super Bowls as an assistant coach with the Dallas Cowboys.
