= J. K. Scott =

American football player (born 1995)

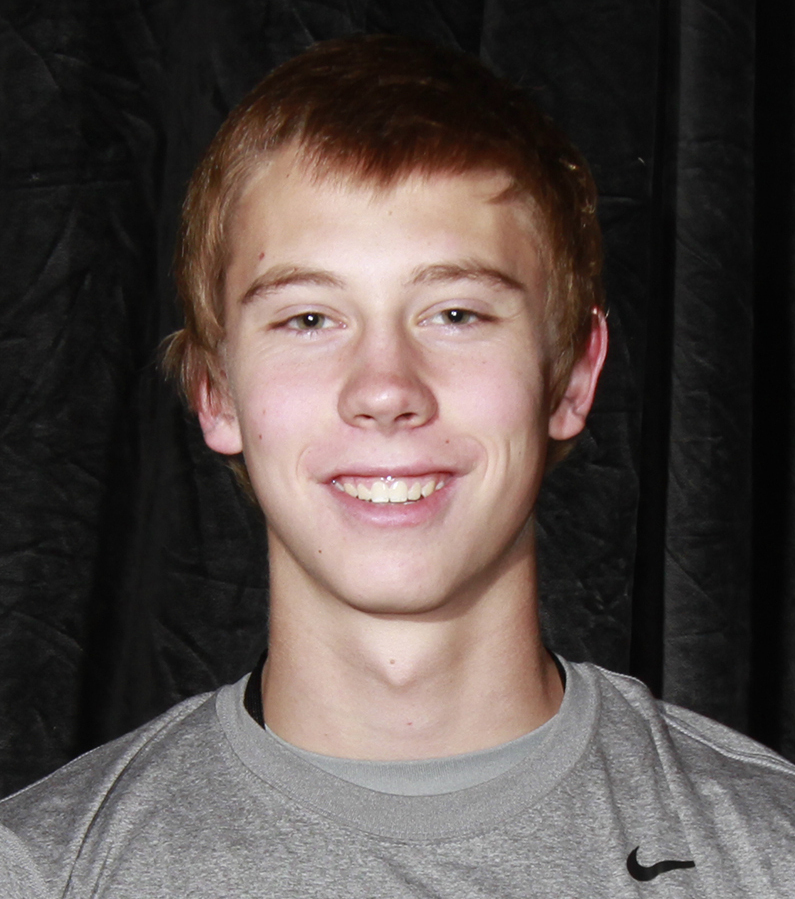
- Scott in 2013

No. 16 – Los Angeles Chargers
- Position: Punter
- Roster status: Active

Personal information
- Born: October 30, 1995 (age 31); Denver, Colorado, U.S.
- Listed height: 6 ft 5 in (1.96 m)
- Listed weight: 208 lb (94 kg)

Career information
- High school: Mullen (Denver)
- College: Alabama (2014–2017)
- NFL draft: 2018: 5th round, 172nd overall pick

Career history
- Green Bay Packers (2018–2020); Jacksonville Jaguars (2021); Los Angeles Chargers (2022–present)

Awards and highlights
- 2× CFP national champion (2015, 2017); 2× First-team All-SEC (2014, 2016); Second-team All-SEC (2017)

Career NFL statistics as of Week 5, 2026
- Punts: 498
- Punting yards: 22,668
- Average punt: 45.5
- Inside 20: 178
- Longest punt: 83
- Stats at Pro Football Reference

John Kimball Scott III (born October 30, 1995) is an American professional football punter for the Los Angeles Chargers of the National Football League (NFL). He played college football for the Alabama Crimson Tide, and was selected by the Green Bay Packers in the fifth round of the 2018 NFL draft. He has also played for the Jacksonville Jaguars.

== Early life ==
Scott attended and played high school football at Mullen High School in Denver. He received offers from Arizona, Colorado, and Notre Dame but ultimately accepted Alabama's offer. His father Kim Scott was an All-American pole vaulter for the Wisconsin Badgers track and field team, placing 4th at the 1975 NCAA Indoor Track and Field Championships.

Scott converted 13 of 25 field goals with a long of 59 yards and made 69 of 71 point-after attempts during his high school career. He also had 4,758 kickoff yards.

== College career ==
Scott attended the University of Alabama, where he played on the Alabama Crimson Tide football team under head coach Nick Saban from 2014 to 2017. He was a consensus first-team All-Southeastern Conference (SEC) selection in 2014 and was chosen as an All-American by Sporting News, Sports Illustrated, ESPN, and USA Today. He was also named first-team All-SEC for his performances in the 2016 season, and was part of the 2015 and 2017 Alabama Crimson Tide national championship teams.

== Professional career ==
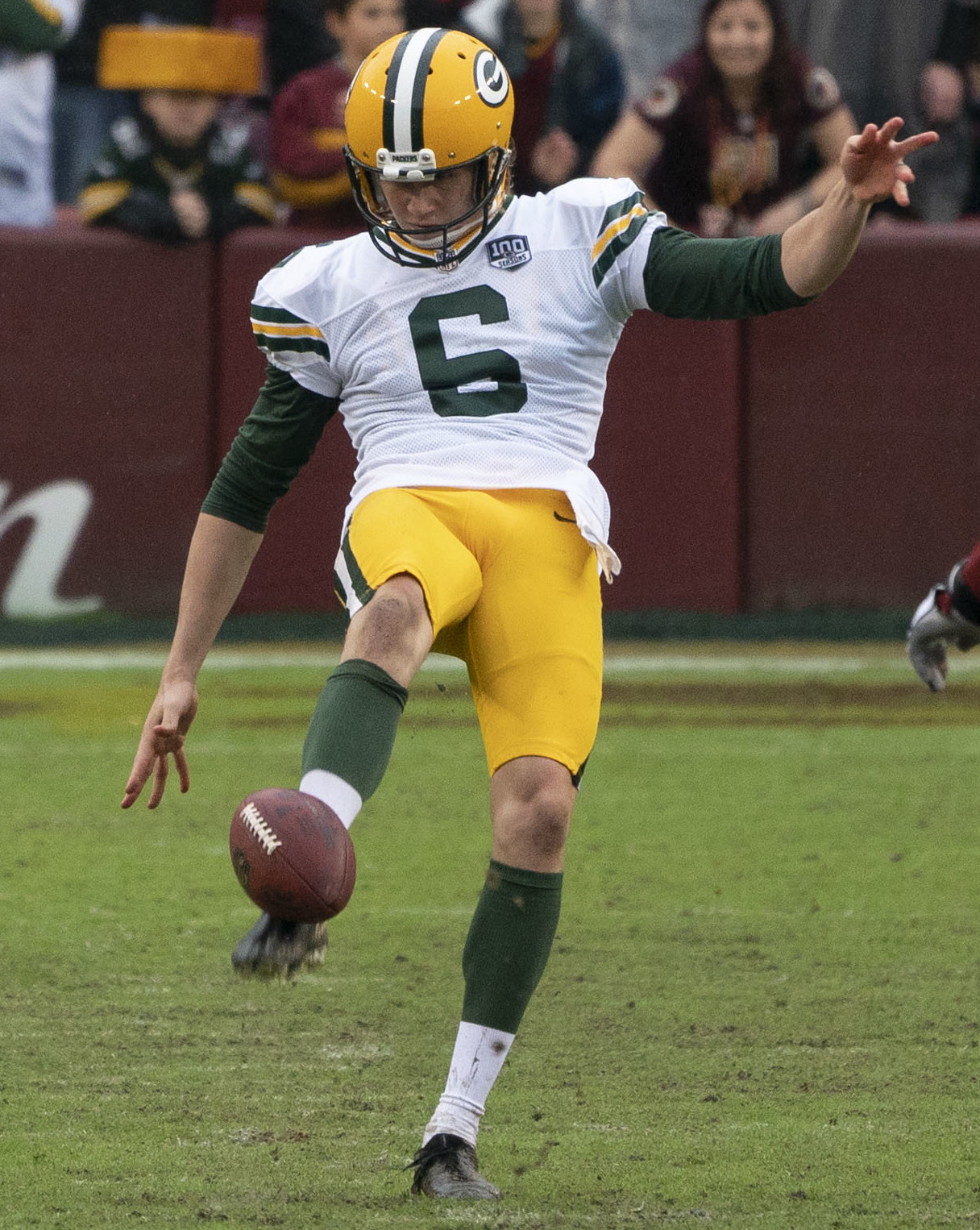
Scott punting against the Washington Redskins in 2018

External videos
- Scott gets drafted by Green Bay

Pre-draft measurables
Height	Weight	Arm length	Hand span	Wingspan	40-yard dash	10-yard split	20-yard split	20-yard shuttle	Three-cone drill	Vertical jump	Broad jump
6 ft 5 5/8 in (1.97 m)	208 lb (94 kg)	33 1/8 in (0.84 m)	9 in (0.23 m)	6 ft 7 1/4 in (2.01 m)	4.83 s	1.69 s	2.81 s	4.41 s	7.28 s	30.5 in (0.77 m)	9 ft 6 in (2.90 m)
All values from NFL Combine

=== Green Bay Packers ===
Scott was selected by the Green Bay Packers with the 172nd overall pick in the fifth round of the 2018 NFL draft. He was the second of four punters to be selected that year. On May 4, 2018, he signed a contract with the Packers. He made his NFL debut in the Packers' season opener against the Chicago Bears. He had four punts for 192 yards in the 24–23 victory. Overall, in his rookie season, Scott punted 71 times for 3,176 yards for a 44.73 average. In addition, Scott had one kickoff attempt for 61 yards. In the 2019 season, Scott finished with 77 punts for 3,386 net yards for a 43.97 average. In the 2020 season, he finished with 46 punts for 2,092 yards for a 45.5 average.

On August 31, 2021, Packers released Scott as part of their final roster cuts, after they traded for punter Corey Bojorquez.

=== Jacksonville Jaguars ===
On December 31, 2021, Scott was signed to the Jacksonville Jaguars active roster. He appeared in one game with the team, in Week 17 against the New England Patriots.

=== Los Angeles Chargers ===
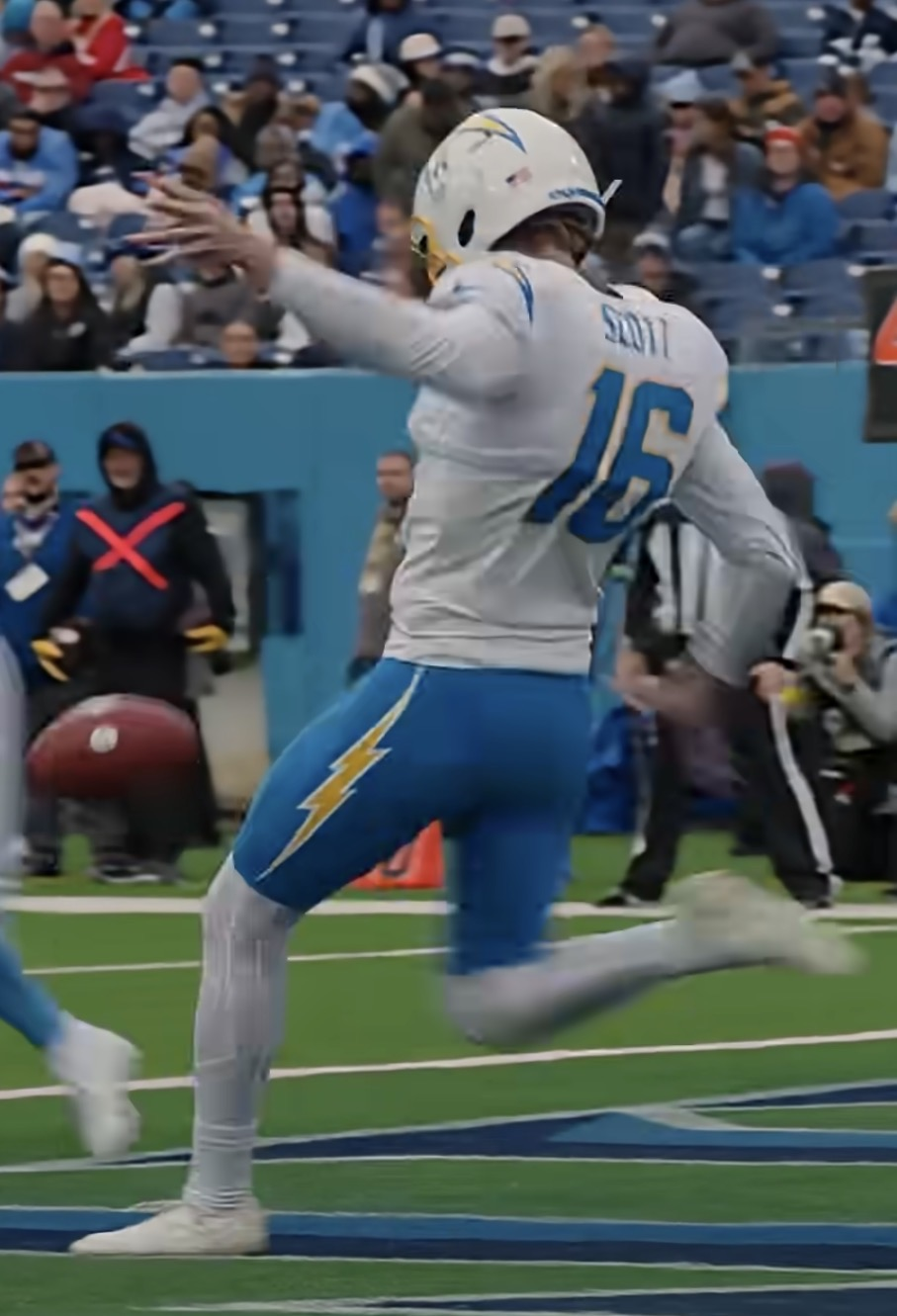
Scott with the Los Angeles Chargers in 2025

On March 21, 2022, Scott was signed by the Los Angeles Chargers. In Week 12, Scott punted six times, four inside the 20-yard line with a long of 48 in a 25–24 win over the Arizona Cardinals, earning AFC Special Teams Player of the Week. He finished the 2022 season with 73 punts for 3,186 yards for a 43.6 average.

In Week 13 of the 2023 season, Scott punted eight times, with seven inside the 20-yard line, in a 6–0 win over the New England Patriots, earning AFC Special Teams Player of the Week. He finished the 2023 season with 75 punts for 3,475 yards for a 46.3 average.

In the 2024 season, Scott finished with 72 punts for 3,362 yards for a 46.7 average. with In the 2025 season, Scott finished with 60 punts for 2,871 yards for a 47.9 average.

On August 30, 2026, Scott was released by Los Angeles as a part of final roster cuts. The following day, the Chargers re–signed Scott to their active roster.

== Career statistics ==
=== NFL ===
==== Regular season ====
Year	Team	GP	Punting							
Year	Team	GP	Punts	Yds	Lng	Avg	Net Avg	Blk	Ins20	RetY
2018	GB	16	71	3,176	67	44.7	39.3	1	19	206
2019	GB	16	77	3,386	66	44.0	39.9	0	29	233
2020	GB	16	46	2,092	62	45.5	37.8	1	15	291
2021	JAX	1	4	159	47	39.8	39.8	0	0	0
2022	LAC	17	73	3,186	60	43.6	41.5	0	28	58
2023	LAC	17	75	3,475	83	46.3	42.3	0	30	221
2024	LAC	17	72	3,362	67	46.7	41.9	0	28	269
2025	LAC	17	60	2,871	60	47.9	41.4	0	23	309
2026	LAC	5	20	961	57	48.1	40.5	1	6	71
Total		122	498	22,668	83	45.5	40.5	3	178	1,670
Source: NFL.com

==== Postseason ====
Year	Team	GP	Punting							
Year	Team	GP	Punts	Yds	Lng	Avg	Net Avg	Blk	Ins20	RetY
2019	GB	2	8	345	62	43.1	38.6	0	2	36
2020	GB	2	5	222	55	44.4	42.4	0	1	10
2022	LAC	1	5	203	54	40.6	39.8	0	3	4
2024	LAC	1	5	221	55	44.2	42.2	0	2	10
2025	LAC	1	5	211	54	42.2	37.8	0	3	2
Total		7	28	1,202	62	42.9	40.7	0	11	62
Source: pro-football-reference.com

=== College ===
Year	Team	GP	Punting									
Year	Team	GP	Punts	Yds	Lng	Avg	Blk	In 20	TB	FC	Ret	RetY
2014	Alabama	13	55	2,640	73	48.0	0	31	5	19	12	83
2015	Alabama	15	70	3,094	59	44.2	1	25	9	18	27	279
2016	Alabama	15	64	3,020	66	47.2	1	25	12	15	20	213
2017	Alabama	14	54	2,320	64	43.0	1	27	4	27	5	36
Total		57	243	11,074	73	45.6	3	108	30	79	64	611
Source: RollTide.com

== Personal life ==
Scott is married to Sydney Scott. They married in January 2018, and have a son who was born in November 2018.
