= Joe Hortiz =

American football executive (born 1975)

Los Angeles Chargers
- Title: General manager

Personal information
- Born: November 8, 1975 (age 50); Philadelphia, Pennsylvania, U.S.

Career information
- High school: Salesianum School (Wilmington, Delaware)
- College: Auburn

Career history

Coaching
- Auburn (1995–1997) Graduate assistant

Operations
- Baltimore Ravens (1998–2023); Personnel assistant (1998–2000); Scout (2001–2008); Director of college scouting (2009–2018); Director of player personnel (2019–2023); Los Angeles Chargers (2024–present) General manager

Awards and highlights
- 2× Super Bowl champion (XXXV, XLVII)
- Executive profile at Pro Football Reference

Joseph Hortiz (born November 8, 1975) is an American professional football executive who is the general manager (GM) for the Los Angeles Chargers of the National Football League (NFL). He previously served for the Baltimore Ravens in various scouting and executive roles from 1998 until being named GM of the Chargers in 2024.

== Early life and education ==
Born on November 8, 1975, in Philadelphia, Pennsylvania, Hortiz attended Salesianum School in Wilmington, Delaware, before earning a bachelor's degree in accounting from Auburn University. While attending Auburn, he served as a graduate assistant from 1995 to 1997.

== Executive career ==
=== Baltimore Ravens ===
In 1998, Hortiz began his career as a personnel assistant for the Baltimore Ravens. In 2001, he was promoted to pro scout and to area scout in 2003 under general manager Ozzie Newsome. In 2006, Hortiz was promoted to national scout before being promoted to director of college scouting in 2009. Hortiz was promoted to director of player personnel under general manager Eric DeCosta in 2019.

=== Los Angeles Chargers ===
Hortiz was named general manager of the Los Angeles Chargers in January 2024.

== Personal life ==
Hortiz is married and has four sons.
