= 2026 Los Angeles Chargers season =

67th season in franchise history; 57th in the National Football League

- Owner: Dean Spanos
- General manager: Joe Hortiz
- President: A. G. Spanos
- Head coach: Jim Harbaugh
- Offensive coordinator: Mike McDaniel
- Defensive coordinator: Chris O'Leary
- Home stadium: SoFi Stadium

Results
- Record: 1–9
- Division place: 4th AFC West

Uniform
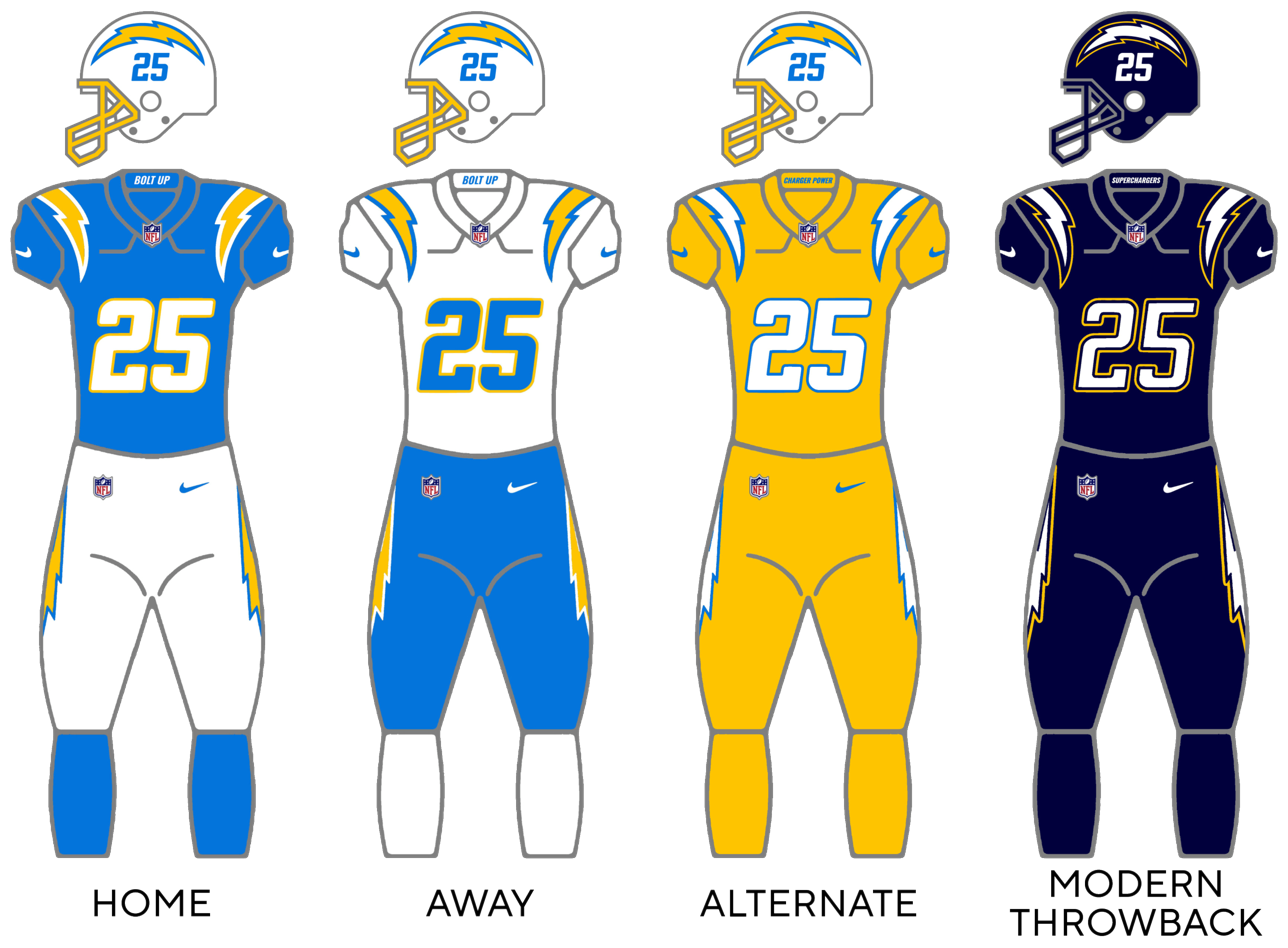

The 2026 season is the Los Angeles Chargers' 57th in the National Football League (NFL), their 67th overall, their 11th in the Greater Los Angeles Area, their seventh playing their home games at SoFi Stadium and their third under the tandem of general manager Joe Hortiz and head coach Jim Harbaugh. The Chargers failed to improve on their 11–6 record from the previous two seasons after starting the season 0–8, their worst since the 2000 season when they were based in San Diego, but will still attempt to make the playoffs for the third consecutive season, and end their 16-year AFC West title drought.

== Offseason ==
=== Draft ===
2026 Los Angeles Chargers draft selections
| Round | Selection | Player | Position | College | Notes |
|---|---|---|---|---|---|
| 1 | 22 | Akheem Mesidor | LB | Miami (FL) | |
| 2 | 55 | Traded to the New England Patriots (Note: The Chargers traded pick 55 to the New England Patriots in exchange for picks 63, 131, and 202.) | | | |
| 2 | 63 | Jake Slaughter | C | Florida | from Patriots |
| 3 | 86 | Traded to the Cleveland Browns (Note: The Chargers traded pick 86 to the Cleveland Browns in exchange for picks 105, 145, and 206.) | | | |
| 4 | 105 | Brenen Thompson | WR | Mississippi State | from Cleveland (Note: Originally from the New York Giants) |
| 4 | 117 | Travis Burke | OT | Memphis | from Houston (Note: The Chargers traded picks 123 and 204 to the Houston Texans in exchange for pick 117.) (Note: Originally from Minneapolis to Jacksonville to Las Vegas) |
| 4 | 123 | Traded to the Houston Texans | | | |
| 4 | 131 | Genesis Smith | S | Arizona | from Patriots |
| 5 | 145 | Nick Barrett | DT | South Carolina | from Cleveland |
| 5 | 162 | Traded to the Baltimore Ravens (Note: The Chargers traded a 2026 fifth-round selection (pick 162) and S Alohi Gilman to the Baltimore Ravens in exchange for a 2027 seventh-round selection and OLB Odafe Oweh.) | | | |
| 6 | 202 | Logan Taylor | G | Boston College | from Patriots (Note: Originally from Pittsburgh) |
| 6 | 204 | Traded to the Houston Texans | | | |
| 6 | 206 | Alex Harkey | G | Oregon | from Cleveland (Note: Originally from Chicago) |
| 7 | 238 | Traded to the Tennessee Titans (Note: The Chargers traded a 2026 seventh-round selection (pick 238) to the Tennessee Titans in exchange for S Elijah Molden.) | | | |

2026 Los Angeles Chargers undrafted free agents
| Name | Position | College | Ref. |
|---|---|---|---|
| Noah Avinger | S | Utah State | |
| Lander Barton | LB | Utah | |
| Jerand Bradley | TE | Kansas State | |
| Sincere Brown | WR | Colorado | |
| Jahmeer Carter | DL | Virginia | |
| Gregory Desrosiers | RB | Memphis | |
| Devin Grant | S | Syracuse | |
| Jacobian Guillory | DL | LSU | |
| Niles King | OLB | San Diego State | |
| Devonte Ross | WR | Penn State | |
| Rodney Shelley | CB | Georgia Tech | |
| Avery Smith | CB | Toledo | |
| Jacob Spomer | C | Fresno State | |
| Evan Svoboda | TE | Wyoming | |
| Nadame Tucker | OLB | Western Michigan | |
| Terry Webb | DL | SMU | |
| Jeremiah Wilson | CB | Florida State | |
| Isaiah World | OT | Oregon | |

== Staff ==
Los Angeles Chargers staff
| Front office: Chairman/owner – Dean Spanos; Vice chairman/owner – Michael Spanos; President of business operations – A. G. Spanos; President of football operations – John Spanos; Executive vice president/COO – Jeanne Bonk; Executive vice president of football administration/player finance – Ed McGuire; General manager – Joe Hortiz; Assistant general manager – Chad Alexander; Director of player personnel strategy – Corey Krawiec; Director of pro scouting – Dennis Abraham; Senior director of pro personnel – Louis Clark; Assistant director of pro scouting – Tyler Lyon; Director of football administration – Katie Sylvan; Head coaches: Head coach – Jim Harbaugh; Offensive coaches: Offensive coordinator – Mike McDaniel; Passing game coordinator/quarterbacks – Shane Day; Running backs – Max McCaffrey; Wide receivers – Sanjay Lal; Assistant wide receivers/special teams – Josh Hammond; Tight ends – Chandler Henley; Offensive line – Butch Barry; Assistant offensive line – Nick Hardwick; Passing game specialist – Adam Gase; Offensive assistant – Kirk Campbell; Offensive assistant – Rob Everett | Defensive coaches: Defensive coordinator – Chris O'Leary; Run game coordinator/defensive line – Mike Elston; Assistant defensive line – Julian Campenni; Linebackers – Sean Spence; Outside linebackers – Dylan Roney; Assistant outside linebackers – Denzel Martin; Passing game coordinator/defensive backs – Steve Clinkscale; Safeties – Adam Fuller; Run game specialist – Mike Hiestand; Special teams: Special teams coordinator – Ryan Ficken; Assistant special teams – Chris Gould; Strength and conditioning: Executive director of player performance – Ben Herbert; Head of strength and conditioning – Jonathan Brooks; Head of strength and conditioning – Devin Woodhouse; Director of performance analytics – Ben Rabe; Performance analyst – Lincoln Dewolf; → Coaching staff → Front office → More NFL staffs |

== Current roster ==
Los Angeles Chargers roster
| Quarterbacks (QB): 10 Justin Herbert; 7 DJ Uiagalelei; Running backs (RB): 8 Omarion Hampton; 44 Scott Matlock FB; 34 Keaton Mitchell; 28 Kimani Vidal; Wide receivers (WR): 12 Derius Davis RS; 9 Tre Harris; 1 Quentin Johnston; 84 KeAndre Lambert-Smith; 15 Ladd McConkey; 89 Brenen Thompson; 82 Theo Wease Jr.; Tight ends (TE): 86 Oronde Gadsden II; 88 Charlie Kolar; 83 David Njoku | Offensive linemen (OL): 76 Joe Alt T; 74 Kayode Awosika G; 77 Travis Burke T; 73 Alex Harkey T; 79 Trey Pipkins T; 66 Jake Slaughter C; 60 Jacob Spomer C; 69 Cole Strange G; 65 Logan Taylor G; Defensive linemen (DL): 91 Nick Barrett; 99 Jamaree Caldwell; 92 Justin Eboigbe; 93 Teair Tart; 94 Dalvin Tomlinson | Linebackers (LB): 48 Bud Dupree OLB; 43 Troy Dye ILB; 0 Daiyan Henley ILB; 52 Khalil Mack OLB; 90 Akheem Mesidor OLB; 50 Caleb Murphy OLB; 6 Denzel Perryman LB; 53 Del'Shawn Phillips ILB; 45 Tuli Tuipulotu OLB; 58 Marlowe Wax ILB; Defensive backs (DB): 20 Cam Hart CB; 26 Donte Jackson CB; 23 Tony Jefferson S; 33 Deane Leonard CB; 27 R. J. Mickens S; 2 Elijah Molden S; 22 Genesis Smith S; 4 Tarheeb Still CB; 37 Isas Waxter CB; 32 Kendall Williamson S; Special teams (ST): 11 Cameron Dicker K; 47 Josh Harris LS; 16 J. K. Scott P | Practice squad: 96 Myles Adams DE; 36 Jalyn Armour-Davis CB; 57 Lander Barton LB; 13 Jake Browning QB; 51 Andre Carter II OLB; 41 Zion Childress CB; 25 Junior Colson LB; -- Josiah Deguara TE; 29 Kaiir Elam CB; 39 Luke Grimm WR; 81 Patrick Herbert TE; 35 Amar Johnson RB; 68 Josh Kaltenberger C; 38 Kyu Blu Kelly CB; 31 Tejhaun Palmer WR; 78 Laekin Vakalahi T (IPP); 64 Terry Webb DT; Reserve: 63 Tyler Biadasz C (IR); 30 Alec Ingold FB (IR); 3 Derwin James S (IR); 5 Trey Lance QB (IR); 75 Trevor Penning G (IR); 24 Rodney Shelley CB (IR); 70 Rashawn Slater T (IR); 71 Branson Taylor G (IR); 67 Isaiah World T (NF-Inj.) 53 active, 16 practice squad (1 IPP), 9 reserve As of November 21, 2026. Rookies in italics.; Roster; Depth chart; Transactions |

== Preseason ==
| Week | Date | Opponent | Result | Record | Venue | Recap |
|---|---|---|---|---|---|---|
| 1 | August 13 | at Houston Texans | W 27–7 | 1–0 | Reliant Stadium | Recap |
| 2 | August 20 | San Francisco 49ers | L 17–41 | 1–1 | SoFi Stadium | Recap |
| 3 | August 27 | Los Angeles Rams | L 18–20 | 1–2 | SoFi Stadium | Recap |

== Regular season ==
=== Schedule ===
| Week | Date | Time (PT) | Opponent | Result | Record | Venue | Network | Recap |
|---|---|---|---|---|---|---|---|---|
| 1 | September 13 | 1:25 p.m. | Arizona Cardinals | **L** 14–26 | 0–1 | SoFi Stadium | CBS | Recap |
| 2 | September 20 | 1:05 p.m. | **Las Vegas Raiders** | **L** 14–26 | 0–2 | SoFi Stadium | CBS | Recap |
| 3 | September 27 | 10:00 a.m. | at Buffalo Bills | **L** 16–24 | 0–3 | Highmark Stadium | Fox | Recap |
| 4 | October 4 | 1:25 p.m. | at Seattle Seahawks | **L** 23–30 | 0–4 | Lumen Field | CBS | Recap |
| 5 | October 11 | 1:05 p.m. | **Denver Broncos** | **L** 17–23 | 0–5 | SoFi Stadium | CBS | Recap |
| 6 | October 18 | 1:25 p.m. | at **Kansas City Chiefs** | **L** 6–22 | 0–6 | Arrowhead Stadium | CBS | Recap |
| 7 | Bye | | | | | | | |
| 8 | November 1 | 1:05 p.m. | at Los Angeles Rams | **L** 9–24 | 0–7 | SoFi Stadium | Fox | Recap |
| 9 | November 8 | 1:05 p.m. | Houston Texans | **L** 22–44 | 0–8 | SoFi Stadium | CBS | Recap |
| 10 | November 16 | 5:15 p.m. | at Baltimore Ravens | **W** 23–20 | 1–8 | M&T Bank Stadium | ESPN | Recap |
| 11 | November 22 | 1:05 p.m. | New York Jets | **L** 24–27 | 1–9 | SoFi Stadium | Fox | Recap |
| 12 | November 29 | 1:05 p.m. | New England Patriots | | | SoFi Stadium | CBS | |
| 13 | December 6 | 10:00 a.m. | at Tampa Bay Buccaneers | | | Raymond James Stadium | CBS | |
| 14 | December 13 | 1:05 p.m. | at **Las Vegas Raiders** | | | Allegiant Stadium | CBS | |
| 15 | December 17 | 5:15 p.m. | San Francisco 49ers | | | SoFi Stadium | Prime Video | |
| 16 | December 27 | 10:00 a.m. | at Miami Dolphins | | | Hard Rock Stadium | Fox | |
| 17 | January 2/3 | TBD | **Kansas City Chiefs** | | | SoFi Stadium | TBD | |
| 18 | January 9/10 | TBD | at **Denver Broncos** | | | Empower Field at Mile High | TBD | |

Notes

- Intra-division opponents are in **bold** text.
- Networks, dates and times from Weeks 13–17 are subject to change as a result of flexible scheduling.
- The date, time and network for Week 17 will be finalized by no later than the end of Week 15.
- The date, time and network for Week 18 will be finalized at the end of Week 17.

=== Game summaries ===
==== Week 1: vs. Arizona Cardinals ====
Week 1: Arizona Cardinals at Los Angeles Chargers – Game summary

| Quarter | 1 | 2 | 3 | 4 | Total |
|---|---|---|---|---|---|
| **Cardinals** | 7 | 6 | 3 | 10 | **26** |
| Chargers | 7 | 0 | 7 | 0 | **14** |

at SoFi Stadium, Inglewood, California

- Date: September 13
- Game time: 1:25 p.m. PDT
- Game weather: Sunny, 78 °F (26 °C) (fixed roof)
- Game attendance: 70,540
- Referee: Ron Torbert
- TV announcers (CBS): Kevin Harlan, Trent Green and Melanie Collins
- Recap, Game Book

Game information

**First quarter**

- ARI – Jeremiyah Love 5-yard run (Chad Ryland kick), 8:49. Cardinals 7–0. **Drive: 11 plays, 70 yards, 6:11.**
- LAC – Omarion Hampton 8-yard run (Cameron Dicker kick), 4:22. Tied 7–7. **Drive: 8 plays, 77 yards, 4:27.**

**Second quarter**

- ARI – Chad Ryland 27-yard field goal, 6:51. Cardinals 10–7. **Drive: 12 plays, 57 yards, 6:31.**
- ARI – Chad Ryland 44-yard field goal, 0:00. Cardinals 13–7. **Drive: 8 plays, 61 yards, 1:55.**

**Third quarter**

- ARI – Chad Ryland 34-yard field goal, 7:25. Cardinals 16–7. **Drive: 10 plays, 75 yards, 4:41.**
- LAC – Ladd McConkey 8-yard pass from Justin Herbert (Cameron Dicker kick), 6:03. Cardinals 16–14. **Drive: 10 plays, 75 yards, 4:41.**

**Fourth quarter**

- ARI – Trey McBride 3-yard pass from Jacoby Brissett (Chad Ryland kick), 11:44. Cardinals 23–14. **Drive: 2 plays, 3 yards, 0:37.**
- ARI – Chad Ryland 49-yard field goal, 2:33. Cardinals 26–14. **Drive: 4 plays, 8 yards, 1:36.**

**Top passers**

- ARI – Jacoby Brissett – 27/37, 277 yards, TD
- LAC – Justin Herbert – 17/27, 209 yards, TD, INT

**Top rushers**

- ARI – Tyler Allgeier – 17 rushes, 61 yards
- LAC – Omarion Hampton – 12 rushes, 43 yards, TD

**Top receivers**

- ARI – Trey McBride – 9 receptions, 95 yards, TD
- LAC – Ladd McConkey – 5 receptions, 82 yards, TD

This game marked the Chargers' first home loss to the Cardinals since 2001 when they were based in San Diego. They last lost consecutive games to Arizona in 1998 and 2001.

==== Week 2: vs. Las Vegas Raiders ====
Week 2: Las Vegas Raiders at Los Angeles Chargers – Game summary

| Quarter | 1 | 2 | 3 | 4 | Total |
|---|---|---|---|---|---|
| **Raiders** | 0 | 10 | 7 | 9 | **26** |
| Chargers | 0 | 7 | 7 | 0 | **14** |

at SoFi Stadium, Inglewood, California

- Date: September 20
- Game time: 1:05 p.m. PDT
- Game weather: Mostly sunny, 75 °F (24 °C) (fixed roof)
- Game attendance: 71,567
- Referee: Bill Vinovich
- TV announcers (CBS): Andrew Catalon, Logan Ryan and AJ Ross
- Recap, Game Book

Game information

**First quarter**

- No scoring plays

**Second quarter**

- LV – Tre Tucker 40-yard pass from Kirk Cousins (Matt Gay kick), 11:51. Raiders 7–0. **Drive: 3 plays, 51 yards, 1:22.**
- LAC – Omarion Hampton 1-yard run (Cameron Dicker kick), 5:26. Tied 7–7. **Drive: 10 plays, 69 yards, 6:25.**
- LV – Matt Gay 59-yard field goal, 0:04. Raiders 10–7. **Drive: 6 plays, 43 yards, 0:31.**

**Third quarter**

- LAC – Oronde Gadsden II 10-yard pass from Justin Herbert (Cameron Dicker kick), 9:49. Chargers 14–10. **Drive: 7 plays, 74 yards, 4:07.**
- LV – Cody White 13-yard pass from Kirk Cousins (Matt Gay kick), 3:53. Raiders 17–14. **Drive: 711 plays, 74 yards, 5:56.**

**Fourth quarter**

- LV – Cody White 11-yard pass from Kirk Cousins (Matt Gay kick), 2:59. Raiders 24–14. **Drive: 3 plays, 16 yards, 0:43.**
- LV – Penalty on Joe Alt enforced in the end zone for a safety, 1:41. Raiders 26–14.

**Top passers**

- LV – Kirk Cousins – 19/29, 253 yards, 3 TD, INT
- LAC – Justin Herbert – 15/27, 192 yards, TD, 2 INT

**Top rushers**

- LV – Ashton Jeanty – 21 rushes, 48 yards
- LAC – Omarion Hampton – 23 rushes, 94 yards, TD

**Top receivers**

- LV – Tre Tucker – 5 receptions, 119 yards, TD
- LAC – Tre Harris – 1 reception, 53 yards

The Chargers snapped their 4-game winning streak against the Raiders. This marked their second home loss to Las Vegas since 2020 as well as the first time a team coached by Jim Harbaugh had started 0–2.

==== Week 3: at Buffalo Bills ====
Week 3: Los Angeles Chargers at Buffalo Bills – Game summary

| Quarter | 1 | 2 | 3 | 4 | Total |
|---|---|---|---|---|---|
| Chargers | 10 | 0 | 3 | 3 | **16** |
| **Bills** | 0 | 10 | 0 | 14 | **24** |

at New Highmark Stadium, Orchard Park, New York

- Date: September 27
- Game time: 1:00 p.m. EDT/10:00 a.m. PDT
- Game weather: Sunny, 68 °F (20 °C)
- Game attendance: 60,361
- Referee: Clete Blakeman
- TV announcers (Fox): Kevin Burkhardt, Tom Brady, Erin Andrews and Tom Rinaldi
- Recap, Game Book

Game information

**First quarter**

- LAC – Keaton Mitchell 1-yard pass from Justin Herbert (Cameron Dicker kick), 10:33. Chargers 7–0. **Drive: 8 plays, 47 yards, 4:11.**
- LAC – Cameron Dicker 31-yard field goal, 0:34. Chargers 10–0. **Drive: 6 plays, 30 yards, 2:49.**

**Second quarter**

- BUF – Tyler Bass 28-yard field goal, 6:02. Chargers 10–3. **Drive: 10 plays, 55 yards, 4:20.**
- BUF – Josh Allen 1-yard run (Tyler Bass kick), 0:16. Tied 10–10. **Drive: 10 plays, 80 yards, 3:49.**

**Third quarter**

- LAC – Cameron Dicker 21-yard field goal, 6:12. Chargers 13–10. **Drive: 13 plays, 69 yards, 8:48.**

**Fourth quarter**

- BUF – Josh Allen 1-yard run (Tyler Bass kick), 7:35. Bills 17–13. **Drive: 13 plays, 58 yards, 5:50.**
- BUF – James Cook 3-yard run (Tyler Bass kick), 3:13. Bills 24–13. **Drive: 6 plays, 45 yards, 1:55.**
- LAC – Cameron Dicker 33-yard field goal, 1:56. Bills 24–16. **Drive: 7 plays, 69 yards, 1:17.**

**Top passers**

- LAC – Justin Herbert – 20/34, 226 yards, TD, INT
- BUF – Josh Allen – 16/26, 204 yards, 2 INT

**Top rushers**

- LAC – Omarion Hampton – 15 rushes, 56 yards
- BUF – James Cook – 24 rushes, 154 yards, TD

**Top receivers**

- LAC – Tre Harris – 6 receptions, 76 yards
- BUF – D. J. Moore – 6 receptions, 67 yards

With the loss, the Chargers fell to 0–3 for the first time since 2017. This also marked Jim Harbaugh's first ever 0–3 start in his career.

==== Week 4: at Seattle Seahawks ====
Week 4: Los Angeles Chargers at Seattle Seahawks – Game summary

| Quarter | 1 | 2 | 3 | 4 | Total |
|---|---|---|---|---|---|
| Chargers | 3 | 3 | 7 | 10 | **23** |
| **Seahawks** | 7 | 13 | 10 | 0 | **30** |

at Lumen Field, Seattle, Washington

- Date: October 4
- Game time: 1:25 p.m. PDT
- Game weather: Cloudy, 63 °F (17 °C)
- Game attendance: 68,691
- Referee: Scott Novak
- TV announcers (CBS): Andrew Catalon, Logan Ryan and AJ Ross
- Recap, Game Book

Game information

**First quarter**

- LAC – Cameron Dicker 40-yard field goal, 11:54. Chargers 3–0. **Drive: 8 plays, 30 yards, 2:44.**
- SEA – Emanuel Wilson 23-yard pass from Sam Darnold (Jason Myers kick), 9:55. Seahawks 7–3. **Drive: 1 play, 23 yards, 0:08.**

**Second quarter**

- SEA – Rashid Shaheed 28-yard run (kick failed), 6:12. Seahawks 13–3. **Drive: 7 plays, 65 yards, 4:11.**
- SEA – Emanuel Wilson 8-yard run (Jason Myers kick), 0:43. Seahawks 20–3. **Drive: 2 plays, 20 yards, 0:37.**
- LAC – Cameron Dicker 39-yard field goal, 0:00. Seahawks 20–6. **Drive: 5 plays, 45 yards, 0:43.**

**Third quarter**

- SEA – Tory Horton 6-yard pass from Sam Darnold (Jason Myers kick), 10:23. Seahawks 27–6. **Drive: 8 plays, 68 yards, 4:37.**
- LAC – Kimani Vidal 9-yard pass from Justin Herbert (Cameron Dicker kick), 4:53. Seahawks 27–13. **Drive: 11 plays, 81 yards, 5:30.**
- SEA – Jason Myers 35-yard field goal, 1:19. Seahawks 30–13. **Drive: 9 plays, 52 yards, 3:34.**

**Fourth quarter'**

- LAC – Omarion Hampton 2-yard run (Cameron Dicker kick), 7:48. Seahawks 30–20. **Drive: 16 plays, 85 yards, 8:31.**
- LAC – Cameron Dicker 36-yard field goal, 2:14. Seahawks 30–23. **Drive: 8 plays, 74 yards, 1:47.**

**Top passers**

- LAC – Justin Herbert – 19/31, 189 yards, TD, 2 INT
- SEA – Sam Darnold – 13/22, 168 yards, 2 TD, INT

**Top rushers**

- LAC – Omarion Hampton – 9 rushes, 45 yards, TD
- SEA – Emanuel Wilson – 21 rushes, 81 yards, TD

**Top receivers**

- LAC – Tre Harris – 3 receptions, 60 yards
- SEA – Jaxon Smith-Njigba – 5 receptions, 76 yards

==== Week 5: vs. Denver Broncos ====
Week 5: Denver Broncos at Los Angeles Chargers – Game summary

| Quarter | 1 | 2 | 3 | 4 | Total |
|---|---|---|---|---|---|
| **Broncos** | 7 | 3 | 0 | 13 | **23** |
| Chargers | 0 | 3 | 14 | 0 | **17** |

at SoFi Stadium, Inglewood, California

- Date: October 11
- Game time: 1:05 p.m. PDT
- Game weather: Cloudy, 70 °F (21 °C) (fixed roof)
- Game attendance: 69,293
- Referee: Shawn Hochuli
- TV announcers (CBS): Ian Eagle, Ross Tucker and Evan Washburn
- Recap, Game Book

Game information

**First quarter**

- DEN – J. K. Dobbins 2-yard run (Wil Lutz kick), 6:53. Broncos 7–0. **Drive: 4 plays, 40 yards, 1:43.**

**Second quarter**

- LAC – Cameron Dicker 42-yard field goal, 8:18. Broncos 7–3. **Drive: 10 plays, 33 yards, 4:55.**
- DEN – Wil Lutz 34-yard field goal, 1:48. Broncos 10–3. **Drive: 14 plays, 60 yards, 6:30.**

**Third quarter**

- LAC – Hayden Rucci 7-yard pass from Justin Herbert (Cameron Dicker kick), 5:32. Tied 10–10. **Drive: 14 plays, 73 yards, 9:28.**
- LAC – Kimani Vidal 42-yard run (Cameron Dicker kick), 0:57. Chargers 17–10. **Drive: 1 play, 42 yards, 0:10.**

**Fourth quarter**

- DEN – Courtland Sutton 5-yard pass from Bo Nix (Wil Lutz kick), 8:53. Tied 17–17. **Drive: 5 plays, 41 yards, 1:34.**
- DEN – Wil Lutz 19-yard field goal, 5:07. Broncos 20–17. **Drive: 5 plays, 22 yards, 2:48.**
- DEN – Wil Lutz 36-yard field goal, 1:08. Broncos 23–17. **Drive: 5 plays, 16 yards, 2:11.**

**Top passers**

- DEN – Bo Nix – 16/27, 123 yards, TD
- LAC – Justin Herbert – 14/24, 121 yards, TD, INT

**Top rushers**

- DEN – J. K. Dobbins – 18 rushes, 68 yards, TD
- LAC – Kimani Vidal – 8 rushes, 57 yards, TD

**Top receivers**

- DEN – Evan Engram – 4 receptions, 55 yards
- LAC – Charlie Kolar – 3 receptions, 37 yards

==== Week 6: at Kansas City Chiefs ====
Week 6: Los Angeles Chargers at Kansas City Chiefs – Game summary

| Quarter | 1 | 2 | 3 | 4 | Total |
|---|---|---|---|---|---|
| Chargers | 3 | 0 | 3 | 0 | **6** |
| **Chiefs** | 9 | 10 | 0 | 3 | **22** |

at Arrowhead Stadium, Kansas City, Missouri

- Date: October 18
- Game time: 3:25 p.m. CDT/1:25 p.m. PDT
- Game weather: Sunny, 68 °F (20 °C)
- Game attendance: 73,640
- Referee: Alan Eck
- TV announcers (CBS): Kevin Harlan, Trent Green, and Melanie Collins
- Recap, Game Book

Game information

**First quarter**

- KC – Harrison Butker 44-yard field goal, 11:20. Chiefs 3–0. **Drive: 7 plays, 41, yards, 3:40.**
- KC – Kenneth Walker III 33-yard run (kick failed), 7:21. Chiefs 9–0. **Drive: 6 plays, 67 yards, 3:07.**
- LAC – Cameron Dicker 23-yard field goal, 1:33. Chiefs 9–3. **Drive: 11 plays, 60 yards, 5:48.**

**Second quarter**

- KC – Kenneth Walker III 2–yard run (Harrison Butker kick), 1:49. Chiefs 16–3. **Drive: 8 plays, 80 yards, 3:40.**
- KC – Harrison Butker 50-yard field goal, 0:20. Chiefs 19–3. **Drive: 3 plays, 38 yards, 0:23.**

**Third quarter**

- LAC – Cameron Dicker 30-yard field goal, 10:44. Chiefs 19–6. **Drive: 9 plays, 60 yards, 4:16.**

**Fourth quarter**

- KC – Harrison Butker 30-yard field goal, 3:52. Chiefs 22–6. **Drive: 11 plays, 50 yards, 3:52.**

**Top passers**

- LAC – Justin Herbert – 22/37, 204 yards, INT
- KC – Patrick Mahomes – 23/30, 272 yards, INT

**Top rushers**

- LAC – Justin Herbert – 5 rushes, 26 yards
- KC – Kenneth Walker III – 19 rushes, 128 yards, 2 TD

**Top receivers**

- LAC – Quentin Johnston – 1 reception, 57 yards
- KC – Xavier Worthy – 7 receptions, 73 yards

This loss marked the Chargers' worst start to a season since 2000.

==== Week 8: at Los Angeles Rams ====
Week 8: Los Angeles Chargers at Los Angeles Rams – Game summary

| Quarter | 1 | 2 | 3 | 4 | Total |
|---|---|---|---|---|---|
| Chargers | 3 | 6 | 0 | 0 | **9** |
| **Rams** | 3 | 7 | 14 | 0 | **24** |

at SoFi Stadium, Inglewood, California

- Date: November 1
- Game time: 1:05 p.m. PST
- Game weather: Sunny, 70 °F (21 °C) (fixed roof)
- Game attendance: 73,621
- Referee: Brad Rogers
- TV announcers (Fox): Adam Amin, Drew Brees, and Kristina Pink
- Recap, Game Book

Game information

**First quarter**

- LAR – Brandon McManus 30-yard field goal, 5:42. Rams 3–0. **Drive: 4 plays, 8 yards, 1:29.**
- LAC – Cameron Dicker 34-yard field goal, 0:00. Tied 3–3. **Drive: 9 plays, 56 yards, 5:38.**

**Second quarter**

- LAC – Cameron Dicker 46-yard field goal, 10:06. Chargers 6–3. **Drive: 8 plays, 47 yards, 3:13.**
- LAC – Cameron Dicker 41-yard field goal, 1:55. Chargers 9–3. **Drive: 11 plays, 57 yards, 6:31.**
- LAR – Kyren Williams 1-yard run (Brandon McManus kick), 0:19. Rams 10–9. **Drive: 5 plays, 66 yards, 1:36.**

**Third quarter**

- LAR – Blake Corum 23-yard run (Brandon McManus kick), 10:42. Rams 17–9. **Drive: 8 plays, 74 yards, 4:18.**
- LAR – Puka Nacua 18-yard pass from Matthew Stafford (Brandon McManus kick), 3:41. Rams 24–9. **Drive: 2 plays, 22 yards, 0:44.**

**Fourth quarter**

- No scoring plays

**Top passers**

- LAC – Justin Herbert – 24/32, 257 yards, 2 INT
- LAR – Matthew Stafford – 17/25, 157 yards, TD, INT

**Top rushers**

- LAC – Kimani Vidal – 8 rushes, 23 yards
- LAR – Blake Corum – 11 rushes, 73 yards, TD

**Top receivers**

- LAC – Ladd McConkey – 4 receptions, 86 yards
- LAR – Puka Nacua – 11 receptions, 80 yards, TD

==== Week 9: vs. Houston Texans ====
Week 9: Houston Texans at Los Angeles Chargers – Game summary

| Quarter | 1 | 2 | 3 | 4 | Total |
|---|---|---|---|---|---|
| **Texans** | 10 | 14 | 7 | 13 | **44** |
| Chargers | 3 | 6 | 0 | 13 | **22** |

at SoFi Stadium, Inglewood, California

- Date: November 8
- Game time: 1:05 p.m. PST
- Game weather: Sunny, 86 °F (30 °C) (fixed roof)
- Game attendance: 67,590
- Referee: Alex Moore
- TV announcers (CBS): Spero Dedes, Adam Archuleta and Aditi Kinkhabwala
- Recap, Game Book

Game information

**First quarter**

- HOU – Xavier Hutchinson 17-yard pass from C. J. Stroud (Ka'imi Fairbairn kick), 10:16. Texans 7–0. **Drive: 8 plays, 73 yards, 4:44.**
- LAC – Cameron Dicker 52-yard field goal, 6:14. Texans 7–3. **Drive: 9 plays, 34 yards, 4:02.**
- HOU – Ka'imi Fairbairn 56-yard field goal, 3:12. Texans 10–3. **Drive: 8 plays, 26 yards, 3:02.**

**Second quarter**

- LAC – Cameron Dicker 33-yard field goal, 8:13. Texans 10–6. **Drive: 9 plays, 36 yards, 5:20.**
- LAC – Cameron Dicker 43-yard field goal, 5:11. Texans 10–9. **Drive: 6 plays, 14 yards, 2:12.**
- HOU – Tank Dell 63-yard pass from C. J. Stroud (Ka'imi Fairbairn kick), 4:28. Texans 17–9. **Drive: 2 plays, 68 yards, 0:43.**
- HOU – Kayshon Boutte 12-yard pass from C. J. Stroud (Ka'imi Fairbairn kick), 0:31. Texans 24–9. **Drive: 7 plays, 76 yards, 0:34.**

**Third quarter**

- HOU – Nico Collins 13-yard pass from C. J. Stroud (Ka'imi Fairbairn kick), 8:16. Texans 31–9. **Drive: 10 plays, 80 yards, 4:33.**

**Fourth quarter**

- HOU – Kayshon Boutte 63-yard pass from C. J. Stroud (Ka'imi Fairbairn kick), 14:12. Texans 38–9. **Drive: 5 plays, 89 yards, 2:02.**
- LAC – Quentin Johnston 58-yard pass from Justin Herbert (pass failed), 12:47. Texans 38–15. **Drive: 3 plays, 60 yards, 1:25.**
- HOU – Ka'imi Fairbairn 31-yard field goal, 8:50. Texans 41–15. **Drive: 8 plays, 62 yards, 3:57.**
- HOU – Derius Davis 15-yard pass from DJ Uiagalelei (Cameron Dicker kick), 4:19. Texans 41–22. **Drive: 10 plays, 71 yards, 4:31.**
- HOU – Ka'imi Fairbairn 41-yard field goal, 2:20. Texans 44–22. **Drive: 7 plays, 21 yards, 1:59.**

**Top passers**

- HOU – C. J. Stroud – 21/35, 384 yards, 5 TD, INT
- LAC – Justin Herbert – 13/23, 193 yards, TD, INT

**Top rushers**

- HOU – Woody Marks – 18 rushes, 70 yards
- LAC – Omarion Hampton – 13 rushes, 60 yards

**Top receivers**

- HOU – Kayshon Boutte – 4 receptions, 125 yards, 2 TD
- LAC – Quentin Johnston – 1 reception, 58 yards, TD

==== Week 10: at Baltimore Ravens ====
Week 10: Los Angeles Chargers at Baltimore Ravens – Game summary

| Quarter | 1 | 2 | 3 | 4 | Total |
|---|---|---|---|---|---|
| **Chargers** | 10 | 7 | 3 | 3 | **23** |
| Ravens | 0 | 10 | 3 | 7 | **20** |

at M&T Bank Stadium, Baltimore, Maryland

- Date: November 16
- Game time: 8:15 p.m. EST/5:15 p.m. PST
- Game weather: Clear, 49 °F (9 °C)
- Game attendance: 69,679
- Referee: Adrian Hill
- TV announcers (ESPN): Joe Buck, Troy Aikman, Lisa Salters and Laura Rutledge
- Recap, Game Book

Game information

**First quarter**

- LAC – Justin Herbert 22-yard run (Cameron Dicker kick), 10:39. Chargers 7–0. **Drive: 6 plays, 63 yards, 2:49.**
- LAC – Cameron Dicker 38-yard field goal, 2:03. Chargers 10–0. **Drive: 6 plays, 40 yards, 2:36.**

**Second quarter**

- BAL – Derrick Henry 2-yard run (Riley Patterson kick), 12:33. Chargers 10–7. **Drive: 10 plays, 65 yards, 4:30.**
- LAC – Omarion Hampton 1-yard run (Cameron Dicker kick), 1:56. Chargers 17–7. **Drive: 13 plays, 48 yards, 7:35.**
- BAL – Riley Patterson 26-yard field goal, 0:00. Chargers 17–10. **Drive: 10 plays, 72 yards, 1:56.**

**Third quarter**

- LAC – Cameron Dicker 34-yard field goal, 9:03. Chargers 20–10. **Drive: 5 plays, 21 yards, 1:46.**
- BAL – Riley Patterson 36-yard field goal, 3:36. Chargers 20–13. **Drive: 12 plays, 54 yards, 5:27.**

**Fourth quarter**

- LAC – Cameron Dicker 35-yard field goal, 14:56. Chargers 23–13. **Drive: 6 plays, 53 yards, 3:40.**
- BAL – Derrick Henry 1-yard run (Riley Patterson kick), 10:23. Chargers 23–20. **Drive: 10 plays, 71 yards, 4:33.**

**Top passers**

- LAC – Justin Herbert – 12/18, 129 yards
- BAL – Jacoby Brissett – 33/48, 340 yards, INT

**Top rushers**

- LAC – Omarion Hampton – 21 rushes, 103 yards, TD
- BAL – Derrick Henry – 10 rushes, 10 yards, 2 TD

**Top receivers**

- LAC – Tre Harris – 5 receptions, 86 yards
- BAL – Mark Andrews – 8 receptions, 82 yards

The Chargers finally got their first win of the season and their first win since defeating the Dallas Cowboys last season improving to 1–8.

==== Week 11: vs. New York Jets ====
Week 11: New York Jets at Los Angeles Chargers – Game summary

| Quarter | 1 | 2 | 3 | 4 | Total |
|---|---|---|---|---|---|
| **Jets** | 3 | 14 | 3 | 7 | **27** |
| Chargers | 3 | 7 | 0 | 14 | **24** |

at SoFi Stadium, Inglewood, California

- Date: November 22
- Game time: 1:05 p.m. PST
- Game weather: Sunny, 66 °F (19 °C) (fixed roof)
- Game attendance: 68,195
- Referee: Alex Kemp
- TV announcers (Fox): Adam Amin, Drew Brees, and Kristina Pink
- Recap, Game Book

==== Week 12: vs. New England Patriots ====
Week 12: New England Patriots at Los Angeles Chargers – Game summary

| Quarter | 1 | 2 | 3 | 4 | Total |
|---|---|---|---|---|---|
| Patriots | 0 | 0 | 0 | 0 | **0** |
| Chargers | 0 | 0 | 0 | 0 | **0** |

at SoFi Stadium, Inglewood, California

- Date: November 29
- Game time: 1:05 p.m. PST
- Game weather: TBD (fixed roof)
- TV announcers (CBS): Andrew Catalon, Logan Ryan and AJ Ross
- Preview

=== Standings ===
==== Division ====
AFC West
| | W | L | T | PCT | DIV | CONF | PF | PA | STK |
|---|---|---|---|---|---|---|---|---|---|
| Kansas City Chiefs | 8 | 2 | 0 | .800 | 3–1 | 6–1 | 271 | 163 | W3 |
| Denver Broncos | 7 | 2 | 0 | .778 | 2–1 | 3–1 | 198 | 186 | W5 |
| Las Vegas Raiders | 4 | 6 | 0 | .400 | 1–1 | 3–3 | 251 | 289 | L2 |
| Los Angeles Chargers | 1 | 9 | 0 | .100 | 0–3 | 1–6 | 168 | 266 | L1 |

==== Conference ====
AFC
| Seed | Team | Division | W | L | T | PCT | DIV | CONF | SOS | SOV | STK |
|---|---|---|---|---|---|---|---|---|---|---|---|
**Division leaders**
| 1 | Buffalo Bills | East | 9 | 1 | 0 | .900 | 2–1 | 6–1 | .424 | .416 | W6 |
| 2 | Kansas City Chiefs | West | 8 | 2 | 0 | .800 | 3–1 | 6–1 | .374 | .300 | W3 |
| 3 (Note: Jacksonville wins tie break over Cincinnati based on head-to-head victory.) | Jacksonville Jaguars | South | 7 | 2 | 0 | .778 | 2–1 | 6–2 | .444 | .408 | W3 |
| 4 | Cincinnati Bengals | North | 7 | 2 | 0 | .778 | 2–1 | 5–2 | .389 | .310 | W5 |
**Wild cards**
| 5 | Denver Broncos | West | 7 | 2 | 0 | .778 | 2–1 | 3–1 | .591 | .522 | W5 |
| 6 (Note: Cleveland wins tie break over Pittsburgh based on division record.) | Cleveland Browns | North | 6 | 4 | 0 | .600 | 2–1 | 4–3 | .410 | .377 | W1 |
| 7 | Pittsburgh Steelers | North | 6 | 4 | 0 | .600 | 2–2 | 3–3 | .465 | .417 | L2 |
**In the hunt**
| 8 | New England Patriots | East | 5 | 5 | 0 | .500 | 3–0 | 5–1 | .576 | .440 | L2 |
| 9 (Note: Houston wins tie break over Las Vegas based on strength of victory.) | Houston Texans | South | 4 | 6 | 0 | .400 | 3–1 | 4–4 | .480 | .308 | W1 |
| 10 | Las Vegas Raiders | West | 4 | 6 | 0 | .400 | 1–1 | 3–3 | .500 | .179 | L2 |
| 11 | Baltimore Ravens | North | 4 | 7 | 0 | .364 | 0–2 | 2–5 | .459 | .286 | L6 |
| 12 (Note: NY Jets wins tie break over Indianapolis based on conference record.) | New York Jets | East | 3 | 8 | 0 | .273 | 0–3 | 3–5 | .560 | .350 | W1 |
| 13 | Indianapolis Colts | South | 3 | 8 | 0 | .273 | 1–3 | 2–6 | .463 | .293 | L1 |
| 14 (Note: LA Chargers wins tie break over Miami and Tennessee based on strength of victory.) | Los Angeles Chargers | West | 1 | 9 | 0 | .100 | 0–3 | 1–6 | .529 | .364 | L1 |
| 15 (Note: Miami wins tie break over Tennessee based on strength of schedule.) | Miami Dolphins | East | 1 | 9 | 0 | .100 | 1–2 | 1–6 | .626 | .273 | L4 |
| 16 | Tennessee Titans | South | 1 | 9 | 0 | .100 | 1–2 | 1–6 | .470 | .273 | L4 |
