= 2025 Los Angeles Chargers season =

66th season in franchise history; 56th in the National Football League

- Owner: Dean Spanos
- General manager: Joe Hortiz
- Head coach: Jim Harbaugh
- Home stadium: SoFi Stadium

Results
- Record: 11–6
- Division place: 2nd AFC West
- Playoffs: Lost Wild Card Playoffs (at Patriots) 3–16
- All-Pros: SS Derwin James (2nd team) (Note: Selected as a slot cornerback); ST Del'Shawn Phillips (2nd team)
- Pro Bowlers: OT Joe Alt; K Cameron Dicker; QB Justin Herbert; SS Derwin James; OLB Tuli Tuipulotu

Uniform
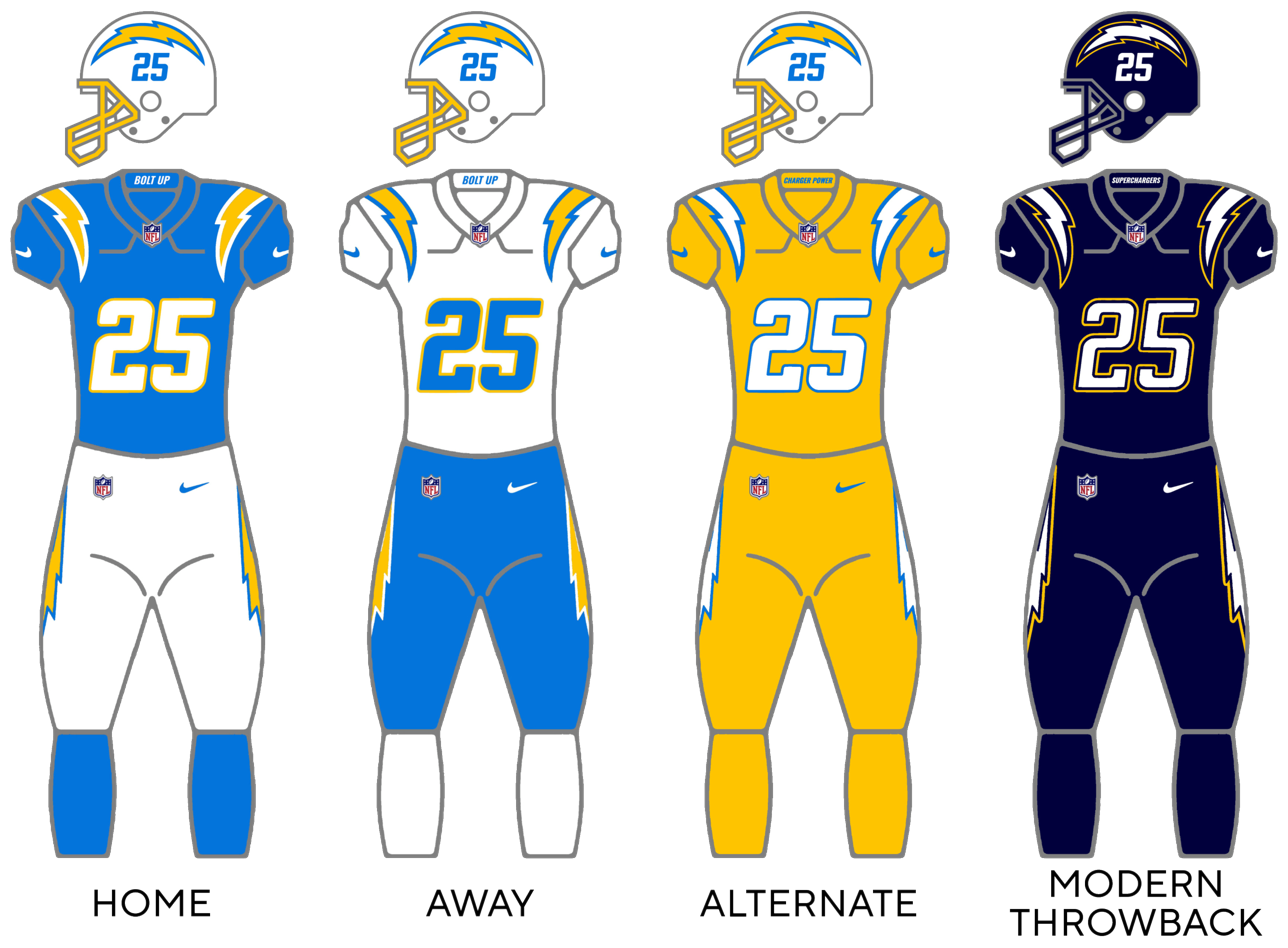

The 2025 season was the Los Angeles Chargers' 56th in the National Football League (NFL), their 66th overall, their tenth in the Greater Los Angeles Area, their sixth playing their home games at SoFi Stadium and their second under the leadership of general manager Joe Hortiz and head coach Jim Harbaugh.

Despite starting the season 3–0 for the first time since 2002, the team would lose 3 out of their next 4 games. They finished the season matching their 11–6 record from the previous season and clinched a playoff berth for the second straight year (their first consecutive playoff berths since 2008-2009) following the Indianapolis Colts' Week 16 loss to the San Francisco 49ers. However, they failed to end their 15-year AFC West title drought after a loss in Week 17 to the Houston Texans.

Los Angeles entered the playoffs as the No. 7 seed in the AFC. They were beaten by a final score of 16-3 in the Wild Card Round by the New England Patriots, ending their season in the Wild Card Round for the second consecutive season and third time in four seasons.

This is the first season since 2015 without outside linebacker Joey Bosa, as he was released on March 5. This made Denzel Perryman and Keenan Allen the last players on the team to have spent time during the team's tenure in San Diego.

The Los Angeles Chargers drew an average home attendance of 73,411, the 7th-highest of all NFL teams. After the season, the Chargers fired offensive coordinator Greg Roman and lost defensive coordinator Jesse Minter, as he went to the Baltimore Ravens to be their head coach after John Harbaugh was fired.

== Draft ==
2025 Los Angeles Chargers draft selections
Round	Selection	Player	Position	College	Notes
1	22	Omarion Hampton	RB	North Carolina	
2	55	Tre Harris	WR	Ole Miss	
3	86	Jamaree Caldwell	DT	Oregon	
4	125	Kyle Kennard	DE	South Carolina	
5	158	KeAndre Lambert-Smith	WR	Auburn	
5	165	Oronde Gadsden II	TE	Syracuse	From Eagles
6	181	Traded to the Philadelphia Eagles			From Patriots (Note: The Chargers traded a seventh-round selection and CB J. C. Jackson to the New England Patriots in exchange for a sixth-round selection.)
6	199	Branson Taylor	OG	Pittsburgh	
6	209	Traded to the Philadelphia Eagles			Compensatory pick
6	214	R.J. Mickens	S	Clemson	Compensatory pick
7	218	Traded to the Atlanta Falcons (Note: The Chargers traded a conditional seventh-round selection (218th overall) to the Atlanta Falcons in exchange for QB Taylor Heinicke.)			From Browns (Note: The Chargers traded K Dustin Hopkins to the Cleveland Browns in exchange for a seventh-round selection (218th overall).)
7	238	Traded to the New England Patriots			
7	256	Trikweze Bridges	S	Florida	Compensatory pick

2025 Los Angeles Chargers undrafted free agents
Name	Position	College	Ref.
TeRah Edwards	DL	Illinois	
Josh Fuga	DL	Virginia Tech	
Luke Grimm	WR	Kansas	
Kylan Guidry	OLB	Western Kentucky	
Nash Jones	G	Texas State	
Jaylen Jones	S	Virginia Tech	
Josh Kaltenberger	C	Maryland	
Stevo Klotz	TE	Iowa State	
Jordan Oladokun	CB	Bowling Green	
Myles Purchase	CB	Iowa State	
Garmon Randolph	OLB	Baylor	
Nikko Reed	CB	Oregon	
Eric Rogers	CB	Rutgers	
Raheim Sanders	RB	South Carolina	
Corey Stewart	T	Purdue	
DJ Uiagalelei	QB	Florida State	
Savion Washington	T	Syracuse	
Marlowe Wax	LB	Syracuse	
Dalevon Campbell	WR	South Carolina	

Draft trades

== Staff ==
2025 Los Angeles Chargers staff
Front office: Chairman/owner – Dean Spanos; Vice chairman/owner – Michael Spanos; President of business operations – A. G. Spanos; President of football operations – John Spanos; Executive vice president/COO – Jeanne Bonk; Executive vice president of football administration/player finance – Ed McGuire; General manager – Joe Hortiz; Assistant general manager – Chad Alexander; Director of player personnel strategy – Corey Krawiec; Director of pro scouting – Dennis Abraham; Senior director of pro personnel – Louis Clark; Assistant director of pro scouting – Tyler Lyon; Director of football administration - Katie Sylvan; Head coaches: Head coach – Jim Harbaugh; Offensive coaches: Offensive coordinator – Greg Roman; Passing game coordinator – Marcus Brady; Quarterbacks – Shane Day; Running backs – Kiel McDonald; Wide receivers – Sanjay Lal; Tight ends/run game coordinator – Andy Bischoff; Offensive line – Mike Devlin; Assistant offensive line – Nick Hardwick; Offensive assistant - Kirk Campbell; Offensive assistant – Josh Hammond; Offensive quality control/tight ends – Jeff Carpenter	Defensive coaches: Defensive coordinator – Jesse Minter; Defensive line – Mike Elston; Linebackers – NaVorro Bowman; Outside linebackers – Dylan Roney; Defensive backs – Steve Clinkscale; Safeties – Adam Fuller; Senior defensive analyst – Rick Minter; Defensive assistant – Mike Hiestand; Defensive quality control – Robert Muschamp; Special teams coaches: Special teams coordinator – Ryan Ficken; Assistant special teams – Chris Gould; Strength and conditioning: Executive director of player performance – Ben Herbert; Head of strength and conditioning – Jonathan Brooks; Head of strength and conditioning – Devin Woodhouse; Director of performance analytics – Ben Rabe; Performance analyst – Lincoln Dewolf

== Final roster ==
2025 Los Angeles Chargers roster
Quarterbacks (QB): 10 Justin Herbert; 5 Trey Lance; Running backs (RB): 8 Omarion Hampton; 28 Hassan Haskins; 44 Scott Matlock FB; 32 Jaret Patterson; 30 Kimani Vidal; Wide receivers (WR): 13 Keenan Allen; 12 Derius Davis; 9 Tre Harris; 1 Quentin Johnston; 15 Ladd McConkey; Tight ends (TE): 83 Tyler Conklin; 89 Will Dissly; 42 Tucker Fisk; 86 Oronde Gadsden II	Offensive linemen (OL): 73 Mekhi Becton RG; 75 Bradley Bozeman C; 74 Austin Deculus LT; 66 Bobby Hart RT; 78 Andre James C; 77 Zion Johnson LG; 64 Trevor Penning LT; 79 Trey Pipkins RT; 68 Jamaree Salyer G; Defensive linemen (DL): 99 Jamaree Caldwell NT; 92 Justin Eboigbe DE; 91 Da'Shawn Hand DE; 93 Otito Ogbonnia NT; 90 Teair Tart NT	Linebackers (LB): 48 Bud Dupree OLB; 43 Troy Dye ILB; 0 Daiyan Henley ILB; 54 Kyle Kennard OLB; 52 Khalil Mack OLB; 98 Odafe Oweh OLB; 6 Denzel Perryman ILB; 53 Del'Shawn Phillips ILB; 45 Tuli Tuipulotu OLB; 58 Marlowe Wax ILB; Defensive backs (DB): 20 Cam Hart CB; 26 Donte Jackson CB; 3 Derwin James SS; 23 Tony Jefferson FS; 33 Deane Leonard CB; 27 R. J. Mickens S; 2 Elijah Molden FS; 29 Tarheeb Still CB; 24 Benjamin St-Juste CB; 40 Kendall Williamson S; Special teams (ST): 11 Cameron Dicker K; 47 Josh Harris LS; 16 J. K. Scott P	Practice squad: 81 Dalevon Campbell WR; 72 Ben Cleveland G; 94 TeRah Edwards NT; 41 Royce Freeman RB; 87 Luke Grimm WR; 82 JaQuae Jackson WR; 34 Amar Johnson RB; 38 Emany Johnson ILB; 35 Marcus Maye S; 95 Kyle Peko NT; 97 Garmon Randolph OLB; 67 Foster Sarell RT; 71 Branson Taylor G; 7 DJ Uiagalelei QB; 37 Isas Waxter CB; 31 Marcus Williams S; 49 Thomas Yassmin TE (IPP); Reserve: 76 Joe Alt LT (IR); 25 Junior Colson ILB (IR); 69 Josh Fuga NT (IR); 22 Najee Harris RB (IR); 84 KeAndre Lambert-Smith WR (IR); 37 Jordan Oladokun CB (IR); 46 Nikko Reed CB (IR); 39 Eric Rogers CB (IR); 70 Rashawn Slater LT (IR); 67 Savion Washington RT (PUP); Rookies in italics 53 active, 10 reserve, 17 practice squad

== Preseason ==
Week	Date	Opponent	Result	Record	Venue	Recap
HOF	July 31	vs. Detroit Lions	W 34–7	1–0	Tom Benson Hall of Fame Stadium	Recap
1	August 10	New Orleans Saints	W 27–13	2–0	SoFi Stadium	Recap
2	August 16	at Los Angeles Rams	L 22–23	2–1	SoFi Stadium	Recap
3	August 23	at San Francisco 49ers	L 23–30	2–2	Levi's Stadium	Recap

== Regular season ==
=== Schedule ===
Week	Date	Opponent	Result	Record	Venue	Recap
1	September 5	**Kansas City Chiefs**	**W** 27–21	1–0	(Brazil) Arena Corinthians (São Paulo)	Recap
2	September 15	at **Las Vegas Raiders**	**W** 20–9	2–0	Allegiant Stadium	Recap
3	September 21	**Denver Broncos**	**W** 23–20	3–0	SoFi Stadium	Recap
4	September 28	at New York Giants	**L** 18–21	3–1	MetLife Stadium	Recap
5	October 5	Washington Commanders	**L** 10–27	3–2	SoFi Stadium	Recap
6	October 12	at Miami Dolphins	**W** 29–27	4–2	Hard Rock Stadium	Recap
7	October 19	Indianapolis Colts	**L** 24–38	4–3	SoFi Stadium	Recap
8	October 23	Minnesota Vikings	**W** 37–10	5–3	SoFi Stadium	Recap
9	November 2	at Tennessee Titans	**W** 27–20	6–3	Nissan Stadium	Recap
10	November 9	Pittsburgh Steelers	**W** 25–10	7–3	SoFi Stadium	Recap
11	November 16	at Jacksonville Jaguars	**L** 6–35	7–4	EverBank Stadium	Recap
12	Bye					
13	November 30	**Las Vegas Raiders**	**W** 31–14	8–4	SoFi Stadium	Recap
14	December 8	Philadelphia Eagles	**W** 22–19 (OT)	9–4	SoFi Stadium	Recap
15	December 14	at **Kansas City Chiefs**	**W** 16–13	10–4	Arrowhead Stadium	Recap
16	December 21	at Dallas Cowboys	**W** 34–17	11–4	AT&T Stadium	Recap
17	December 27	Houston Texans	**L** 16–20	11–5	SoFi Stadium	Recap
18	January 4	at **Denver Broncos**	**L** 3–19	11–6	Empower Field at Mile High	Recap

Note: Intra-division opponents are in bold text.

=== Game summaries ===
==== Week 1: vs. Kansas City Chiefs ====
NFL International Series

Week 1: Kansas City Chiefs at Los Angeles Chargers – Game summary

Quarter	1	2	3	4	Total
Chiefs	0	6	6	9	**21**
**Chargers**	7	6	7	7	**27**

at Arena Corinthians, São Paulo, Brazil

- Date: September 5
- Game time: 9:00 p.m. BRT/5:00 p.m. PDT
- Game weather: Mostly cloudy, 62 °F (17 °C)
- Game attendance: 47,627
- Referee: Carl Cheffers
- TV announcers (KNBC/YouTube): Rich Eisen, Kurt Warner, Stacey Dales and Donald De La Haye
  Game exclusive to KNBC through syndication. Out of market on YouTube.
- Recap, Game Book

Game information

**First quarter**

- LAC – Quentin Johnston 5-yard pass from Justin Herbert (Cameron Dicker kick), 9:11. Chargers 7–0. **Drive: 7 plays, 68 yards, 4:15.**

**Second quarter**

- LAC – Cameron Dicker 39-yard field goal, 13:47. Chargers 10–0. **Drive: 9 plays, 58 yards, 4:40.**
- KC – Harrison Butker 35-yard field goal, 4:50. Chargers 10–3. **Drive: 16 plays, 49 yards, 8:57.**
- LAC – Cameron Dicker 36-yard field goal, 0:45. Chargers 13–3. **Drive: 12 plays, 47 yards, 4:05.**
- KC – Harrison Butker 59-yard field goal, 0:00. Chargers 13–6. **Drive: 5 plays, 31 yards, 0:45.**

**Third quarter**

- KC – Patrick Mahomes 11-yard run (kick failed), 8:05. Chargers 13–12. **Drive: 11 plays, 80 yards, 5:53.**
- LAC – Keenan Allen 11-yard pass from Justin Herbert (Cameron Dicker kick), 0:32. Chargers 20–12. **Drive: 12 plays, 74 yards, 7:33.**

**Fourth quarter**

- KC – Travis Kelce 37-yard pass from Patrick Mahomes (2-pt Conversion failed), 12:04. Chargers 20–18. **Drive: 7 plays, 65 yards, 3:28.**
- LAC – Quentin Johnston 23-yard pass from Justin Herbert (Cameron Dicker kick), 5:02. Chargers 27–18. **Drive: 11 plays, 74 yards, 7:02.**
- KC – Harrison Butker 27-yard field goal, 2:34. Chargers 27–21. **Drive: 10 plays, 63 yards, 2:28.**

**Top passers**

- KC – Patrick Mahomes – 24/39, 258 yards, TD
- LAC – Justin Herbert – 25/34, 318 yards, 3 TD

**Top rushers**

- KC – Patrick Mahomes – 6 rushes, 58 yards, TD
- LAC – Omarion Hampton – 15 rushes, 48 yards

**Top receivers**

- KC – Hollywood Brown – 10 receptions, 99 yards
- LAC – Quentin Johnston – 5 receptions, 79 yards, 2 TD

Following a strong performance from his receivers, star quarterback Justin Herbert finished the game with over three hundred passing yards. After Herbert ran for a first down to run out the clock in the final quarter, the Chargers started 1–0 for the sixth time in seven seasons and defeated the Chiefs for the first time since 2021. This was their first home win against the Chiefs since 2013, and their first since relocating back to Los Angeles in 2017.

==== Week 2: at Las Vegas Raiders ====
Week 2: Los Angeles Chargers at Las Vegas Raiders – Game summary

Quarter	1	2	3	4	Total
**Chargers**	10	7	3	0	**20**
Raiders	3	3	0	3	**9**

at Allegiant Stadium, Paradise, Nevada

- Date: September 15
- Game time: 7:00 p.m. PDT
- Game weather: None (indoor stadium)
- Game attendance: 62,526
- Referee: Clay Martin
- TV announcers (KABC/ESPN): Chris Fowler, Dan Orlovsky, Louis Riddick, Katie George and Peter Schrager
  Game exclusive to KABC through syndication. Out of market on ESPN.
- Recap, Game Book

Game information

**First quarter**

- LAC – Cameron Dicker 38-yard field goal, 13:47. Chargers 3–0. **Drive: 4 plays, 5 yards, 1:02.**
- LV – Daniel Carlson 54-yard field goal, 9:07. Tied 3–3. **Drive: 12 plays, 34 yards, 4:41.**
- LAC – Keenan Allen 10-yard pass from Justin Herbert (Cameron Dicker kick), 0:20. Chargers 10–3. **Drive: 11 plays, 60 yards, 5:14.**

**Second quarter**

- LV – Daniel Carlson 40-yard field goal, 9:58. Chargers 10–6. **Drive: 14 plays, 48 yards, 5:26.**
- LAC – Quentin Johnston 60-yard pass from Justin Herbert (Cameron Dicker kick), 1:51. Chargers 17–6. **Drive: 6 plays, 91 yards, 2:43.**

**Third quarter**

- LAC – Cameron Dicker 20-yard field goal, 7:33. Chargers 20–6. **Drive: 15 plays, 72 yards, 7:30.**

**Fourth quarter**

- LV – Daniel Carlson 37-yard field goal, 11:19. Chargers 20–9. **Drive: 22 plays, 67 yards, 11:15.**

**Top passers**

- LAC – Justin Herbert – 19/27, 242 yards, 2 TD
- LV – Geno Smith – 24/43, 180 yards, 3 INT

**Top rushers**

- LAC – Justin Herbert – 9 rushes, 31 yards
- LV – Ashton Jeanty – 11 rushes, 43 yards

**Top receivers**

- LAC – Quentin Johnston – 3 receptions, 71 yards, TD
- LV – Jakobi Meyers – 6 receptions, 68 yards

Head coach Jim Harbaugh and Raiders head coach Pete Carroll rekindled their rivalry for the first time since 2014, as the Chargers dominated the Raiders to earn their second win of the season.

==== Week 3: vs. Denver Broncos ====
Week 3: Denver Broncos at Los Angeles Chargers – Game summary

Quarter	1	2	3	4	Total
Broncos	0	7	10	3	**20**
**Chargers**	3	7	3	10	**23**

at SoFi Stadium, Inglewood, California

- Date: September 21
- Game time: 1:05 p.m. PDT
- Game weather: Cloudy, 76 °F (24 °C) (fixed roof)
- Game attendance: 70,740
- Referee: Shawn Smith
- TV announcers (CBS): Kevin Harlan, Trent Green and Melanie Collins
- Recap, Game Book

Game information

**First quarter**

- LAC – Cameron Dicker 32-yard field goal, 11:54. Chargers 3–0. **Drive: 8 plays, 56 yards, 3:06.**

**Second quarter**

- LAC – Omarion Hampton 3-yard run (Cameron Dicker kick), 1:53. Chargers 10–0. **Drive: 9 plays, 54 yards, 3:57.**
- DEN – Courtland Sutton 52-yard pass from Bo Nix (Wil Lutz kick), 0:38. Chargers 10–7. **Drive: 7 plays, 72 yards, 1:15.**

**Third quarter**

- DEN – J. K. Dobbins 19-yard run (Wil Lutz kick), 13:40. Broncos 14–10. **Drive: 3 plays, 66 yards, 1:20.**
- DEN – Wil Lutz 42-yard field goal, 12:02. Broncos 17–10. **Drive: 4 plays, 6 yards, 1:30.**
- LAC – Cameron Dicker 24-yard field goal, 5:35. Broncos 17–13. **Drive: 14 plays, 69 yards, 6:27.**

**Fourth quarter**

- DEN – Wil Lutz 26-yard field goal, 12:21. Broncos 20–13. **Drive: 10 plays, 51 yards, 4:50.**
- LAC – Keenan Allen 20-yard pass from Justin Herbert (Cameron Dicker kick), 2:37. Tied 20–20. **Drive: 7 plays, 76 yards, 2:31.**
- LAC – Cameron Dicker 43-yard field goal, 0:00. Chargers 23–20. **Drive: 8 plays, 43 yards, 1:43.**

**Top passers**

- DEN – Bo Nix – 14/25, 153 yards, TD
- LAC – Justin Herbert – 28/47, 300 yards, TD, INT

**Top rushers**

- DEN – J. K. Dobbins – 11 rushes, 83 yards, TD
- LAC – Omarion Hampton – 19 rushes, 70 yards, TD

**Top receivers**

- DEN – Courtland Sutton – 6 receptions, 118 yards, TD
- LAC – Quentin Johnston – 6 receptions, 89 yards

With the win, the Chargers started 3–0 for the first time since 2002. They also defeated all of their division rivals in their first three games, becoming the third team since the 2002 division realignment to do so.

==== Week 4: at New York Giants ====
Week 4: Los Angeles Chargers at New York Giants – Game summary

Quarter	1	2	3	4	Total
Chargers	0	10	8	0	**18**
**Giants**	7	6	8	0	**21**

at MetLife Stadium, East Rutherford, New Jersey

- Date: September 28
- Game time: 1:00 p.m. EDT/10:00 a.m. PDT
- Game weather: Fair, 81 °F (27 °C)
- Game attendance: 81,954
- Referee: Shawn Hochuli
- TV announcers (CBS): Kevin Harlan, Trent Green and Melanie Collins
- Recap, Game Book

Game information

**First quarter**

- NYG – Jaxson Dart 15-yard run (Jude McAtamney kick), 9:20. Giants 7–0. **Drive: 9 plays, 89 yards, 4:17.**

**Second quarter**

- NYG – Jude McAtamney 22-yard field goal, 13:47. Giants 10–0. **Drive: 4 plays, -1 yard, 1:46.**
- LAC – Cameron Dicker 43-yard field goal, 8:06. Giants 10–3. **Drive: 10 plays, 40 yards, 5:41.**
- NYG – Jude McAtamney 31-yard field goal, 1:52. Giants 13–3. **Drive: 15 plays, 47 yards, 6:14.**
- LAC – Quentin Johnston 36-yard pass from Justin Herbert (Cameron Dicker kick), 0:27. Giants 13–10. **Drive: 8 plays, 75 yards, 1:25.**

**Third quarter**

- NYG – Theo Johnson 3-yard pass from Jaxson Dart (Cameron Skattebo run), 2:49. Giants 21–10. **Drive: 2 plays, 3 yards, 0:44.**
- LAC – Omarion Hampton 54-yard run (Justin Herbert run), 1:27. Giants 21–18. **Drive: 3 plays, 66 yards, 1:22.**

**Fourth quarter**

- No scoring plays

**Top passers**

- LAC – Justin Herbert – 23/41, 203 yards, TD, 2 INT
- NYG – Jaxson Dart – 13/20, 111 yards, TD

**Top rushers**

- LAC – Omarion Hampton – 12 rushes, 128 yards, TD
- NYG – Cameron Skattebo – 25 rushes, 79 yards

**Top receivers**

- LAC – Quentin Johnston – 8 receptions, 98 yards, TD
- NYG – Darius Slayton – 3 receptions, 44 yards

With the upset loss, the Chargers suffered their first defeat of the season, falling to 3–1. It was their first loss to the Giants since 1998 and their first road loss to the Giants since 1986.

==== Week 5: vs. Washington Commanders ====
Week 5: Washington Commanders at Los Angeles Chargers – Game summary

Quarter	1	2	3	4	Total
**Commanders**	0	10	10	7	**27**
Chargers	10	0	0	0	**10**

at SoFi Stadium, Inglewood, California

- Date: October 5
- Game time: 1:25 p.m. PDT
- Game weather: Sunny, 77 °F (25 °C) (fixed roof)
- Game attendance: 71,021
- Referee: John Hussey
- TV announcers (Fox): Kevin Burkhardt, Tom Brady, Erin Andrews and Tom Rinaldi
- Recap, Game Book

Game information

**First quarter**

- LAC – Ladd McConkey 2-yard pass from Justin Herbert (Cameron Dicker kick), 9:49. Chargers 7–0. **Drive: 9 plays, 76 yards, 5:11.**
- LAC – Cameron Dicker 55-yard field goal, 2:57. Chargers 10–0. **Drive: 9 plays, 43 yards, 5:24.**

**Second quarter**

- WAS – Jacory Croskey-Merritt 15-yard run (Matt Gay kick), 4:15. Chargers 10–7. **Drive: 9 plays, 74 yards, 4:35.**
- WAS – Matt Gay 29-yard field goal, 0:02. Tied 10–10. **Drive: 8 plays, 82 yards, 1:33.**

**Third quarter**

- WAS – Jacory Croskey-Merritt 5-yard run (Matt Gay kick), 10:58. Commanders 17–10. **Drive: 7 plays, 69 yards, 4:02.**
- WAS – Matt Gay 36-yard field goal, 5:49. Commanders 20–10. **Drive: 8 plays, 39 yards, 2:35.**

**Fourth quarter**

- WAS – Deebo Samuel 8-yard pass from Jayden Daniels (Matt Gay kick), 1:08. Commanders 27–10. **Drive: 13 plays, 99 yards, 6:32.**

**Top passers**

- WAS – Jayden Daniels – 15/26, 231 yards, TD
- LAC – Justin Herbert – 22/29, 166 yards, TD, INT

**Top rushers**

- WAS – Jacory Croskey-Merritt – 14 rushes, 111 yards, 2 TD
- LAC – Justin Herbert – 4 rushes, 60 yards

**Top receivers**

- WAS – Deebo Samuel – 8 receptions, 96 yards, TD
- LAC – Keenan Allen – 5 receptions, 58 yards

The Chargers took a 10–0 lead in the first quarter. However, that would be their only points scored of the game, as the Commanders rallied back with a powerful run attack and strong defense to score 27 unanswered points, sealing the upset loss for the Chargers. They fell to 3–2, and suffered their first home loss to the Commanders since 1986, when they were based in San Diego and the Commanders were known as the Redskins.

Wide receiver Keenan Allen recorded his 1,000th career reception, becoming the fastest player in NFL history to reach the milestone. He achieved the mark in his 159th game, surpassing Hall of Famer Marvin Harrison, who previously held the record at 167 games.

==== Week 6: at Miami Dolphins ====
Week 6: Los Angeles Chargers at Miami Dolphins – Game summary

Quarter	1	2	3	4	Total
**Chargers**	6	3	14	6	**29**
Dolphins	7	6	0	14	**27**

at Hard Rock Stadium, Miami Gardens, Florida

- Date: October 12
- Game time: 1:00 p.m. EDT/10:00 a.m. PDT
- Game weather: Partly cloudy, 85 °F (29 °C)
- Game attendance: 65,592
- Referee: Bill Vinovich
- TV announcers (CBS): Andrew Catalon, Charles Davis, Jason McCourty and AJ Ross
- Recap, Game Book

Game information

**First quarter**

- LAC – Cameron Dicker 35-yard field goal, 7:52. Chargers 3–0. **Drive: 11 plays, 42 yards, 6:14.**
- MIA – De'Von Achane 49-yard run (Riley Patterson kick), 4:03. Dolphins 7–3. **Drive: 1 play, 49 yards, 0:08.**
- LAC – Cameron Dicker 31-yard field goal, 0:35. Dolphins 7–6. **Drive: 7 plays, 55 yards, 3:28.**

**Second quarter**

- LAC – Cameron Dicker 29-yard field goal, 8:39. Chargers 9–7. **Drive: 6 plays, 42 yards, 3:18.**
- MIA – Riley Patterson 47-yard field goal, 4:30. Dolphins 10–9. **Drive: 8 plays, 36 yards, 4:09.**
- MIA – Riley Patterson 27-yard field goal, 0:00. Dolphins 13–9. **Drive: 9 plays, 73 yards, 1:38.**

**Third quarter**

- LAC – Ladd McConkey 5-yard pass from Justin Herbert (Cameron Dicker kick), 7:26. Chargers 16–13. **Drive: 13 plays, 72 yards, 7:34.**
- LAC – Kimani Vidal 7-yard pass from Justin Herbert (Cameron Dicker kick), 3:55. Chargers 23–13. **Drive: 4 plays, 37 yards, 1:59.**

**Fourth quarter**

- LAC – Cameron Dicker 35-yard field goal, 12:47. Chargers 26–13. **Drive: 9 plays, 62 yards, 4:34.**
- MIA – De'Von Achane 4-yard run (Riley Patterson kick), 7:56. Chargers 26–20. **Drive: 9 plays, 69 yards, 4:51.**
- MIA – Darren Waller 7-yard pass from Tua Tagovailoa (Riley Patterson kick), 0:46. Dolphins 27–26. **Drive: 13 plays, 82 yards, 5:33.**
- LAC – Cameron Dicker 33-yard field goal, 0:05. Chargers 29–27. **Drive: 6 plays, 44 yards, 0:41.**

**Top passers**

- LAC – Justin Herbert – 29/38, 264 yards, 2 TD
- MIA – Tua Tagovailoa – 21/32, 205 yards, TD, 3 INT

**Top rushers**

- LAC – Kimani Vidal – 18 rushes, 124 yards
- MIA – De'Von Achane – 16 rushes, 128 yards, 2 TD

**Top receivers**

- LAC – Ladd McConkey – 7 receptions, 100 yards, TD
- MIA – Jaylen Waddle – 6 receptions, 95 yards

With the win, the Chargers snapped their 2 game losing streak to improve to 4–2.

==== Week 7: vs. Indianapolis Colts ====
Week 7: Indianapolis Colts at Los Angeles Chargers – Game summary

Quarter	1	2	3	4	Total
**Colts**	6	17	15	0	**38**
Chargers	3	0	14	7	**24**

at SoFi Stadium, Inglewood, California

- Date: October 19
- Game time: 1:05 p.m. PDT
- Game weather: Sunny, 79 °F (26 °C) (fixed roof)
- Game attendance: 71,124
- Referee: Alan Eck
- TV announcers (CBS): Ian Eagle, J. J. Watt and Evan Washburn
- Recap, Game Book

Game information

**First quarter**

- IND – Jonathan Taylor 23-yard run (kick failed), 12:36. Colts 6–0. **Drive: 5 plays, 75 yards, 2:24.**
- LAC – Cameron Dicker 43-yard field goal, 7:35. Colts 6–3. **Drive: 9 plays, 44 yards, 5:01.**

**Second quarter**

- IND – Michael Pittman Jr. 4-yard pass from Daniel Jones (Michael Badgley kick), 14:54. Colts 13–3. **Drive: 17 plays, 70 yards, 7:41.**
- IND – Tyler Warren 5-yard pass from Daniel Jones (Michael Badgley kick), 8:56. Colts 20–3. **Drive: 8 plays, 80 yards, 4:34.**
- IND – Michael Badgley 36-yard field goal, 0:00. Colts 23–3. **Drive: 9 plays, 62 yards, 1:54.**

**Third quarter**

- LAC – Quentin Johnston 7-yard pass from Justin Herbert (Cameron Dicker kick), 13:01. Colts 23–10. **Drive: 6 plays, 70 yards, 1:59.**
- IND – Jonathan Taylor 8-yard run (Daniel Jones–Michael Pittman Jr. pass), 12:03. Colts 31–10. **Drive: 2 plays, 14 yards, 0:58.**
- LAC – Keenan Allen 4-yard pass from Justin Herbert (Cameron Dicker kick), 6:13. Colts 31–17. **Drive: 10 plays, 76 yards, 5:50.**
- IND – Jonathan Taylor 19-yard run (Michael Badgley kick), 3:33. Colts 38–17. **Drive: 5 plays, 73 yards, 2:40.**

**Fourth quarter**

- LAC – Oronde Gadsden II 15-yard pass from Justin Herbert (Cameron Dicker kick), 13:40. Colts 38–24. **Drive: 11 plays, 76 yards, 4:53.**

**Top passers**

- IND – Daniel Jones – 23/34, 288 yards, 2 TD
- LAC – Justin Herbert – 37/55, 420 yards, 3 TD, 2 INT

**Top rushers**

- IND – Jonathan Taylor – 16 rushes, 94 yards, 3 TD
- LAC – Justin Herbert – 6 rushes, 31 yards

**Top receivers**

- IND – Alec Pierce – 5 receptions, 98 yards
- LAC – Oronde Gadsden II – 7 receptions, 164 yards, TD

The Chargers faced off against Colts head coach Shane Steichen, who spent nine seasons with the Chargers in various roles. Justin Herbert threw for a career-high 420 passing yards and three touchdowns. His 37 completions set a new franchise record. However, he was sacked three times and intercepted twice as the Chargers were overwhelmed by the Colts. With their first loss to the Colts since 2016, the Chargers fell to 4–3 and dropped to second place in the division following the Broncos’ dramatic comeback win over the Giants.

==== Week 8: vs. Minnesota Vikings ====
Week 8: Minnesota Vikings at Los Angeles Chargers – Game summary

Quarter	1	2	3	4	Total
Vikings	0	3	7	0	**10**
**Chargers**	7	14	3	13	**37**

at SoFi Stadium, Inglewood, California

- Date: October 23
- Game time: 5:15 p.m. PDT
- Game weather: Sunny, 68 °F (20 °C) (fixed roof)
- Game attendance: 71,094
- Referee: Clete Blakeman
- TV announcers (Prime Video): Al Michaels, Kirk Herbstreit and Kaylee Hartung
- Recap, Game Book

Game information

**First quarter**

- LAC – Oronde Gadsden II 8-yard pass from Justin Herbert (Cameron Dicker kick), 4:01. Chargers 7–0. **Drive: 14 plays, 83 yards, 7:39.**

**Second quarter**

- LAC – Kimani Vidal 3-yard run (Cameron Dicker kick), 13:08. Chargers 14–0. **Drive: 8 plays, 59 yards, 4:04.**
- MIN – Will Reichard 54-yard field goal, 8:55. Chargers 14–3. **Drive: 9 plays, 35 yards, 4:13.**
- LAC – Ladd McConkey 27-yard pass from Justin Herbert (Cameron Dicker kick), 0:45. Chargers 21–3. **Drive: 9 plays, 94 yards, 3:19.**

**Third quarter**

- LAC – Cameron Dicker 43-yard field goal, 10:01. Chargers 24–3. **Drive: 9 plays, 42 yards, 4:59.**
- MIN – Jordan Addison 4-yard pass from Carson Wentz (Will Reichard kick), 4:36. Chargers 24–10. **Drive: 6 plays, 26 yards, 2:22.**

**Fourth quarter**

- LAC – Tre Harris 6-yard pass from Justin Herbert (Cameron Dicker kick), 12:42. Chargers 31–10. **Drive: 12 plays, 73 yards, 6:54.**
- LAC – Cameron Dicker 34-yard field goal, 7:01. Chargers 34–10. **Drive: 7 plays, 36 yards, 4:52.**
- LAC – Cameron Dicker 45-yard field goal, 1:56. Chargers 37–10. **Drive: 7 plays, 9 yards, 4:23.**

**Top passers**

- MIN – Carson Wentz – 15/27, 144 yards, TD, INT
- LAC – Justin Herbert – 18/25, 227 yards, 3 TD, INT

**Top rushers**

- MIN – Zavier Scott – 2 rushes, 16 yards
- LAC – Kimani Vidal – 23 rushes, 117 yards, TD

**Top receivers**

- MIN – Justin Jefferson – 7 receptions, 74 yards
- LAC – Ladd McConkey – 6 receptions, 88 yards, TD

With the dominant win over Minnesota, the Chargers improved to 5–3.

==== Week 9: at Tennessee Titans ====
Week 9: Los Angeles Chargers at Tennessee Titans – Game summary

Quarter	1	2	3	4	Total
**Chargers**	7	13	0	7	**27**
Titans	14	3	0	3	**20**

at Nissan Stadium, Nashville, Tennessee

- Date: November 2
- Game time: 12:00 p.m. CST/10:00 a.m. PST
- Game weather: Cloudy, 46 °F (8 °C)
- Game attendance: 58,592
- Referee: Alex Kemp
- TV announcers (CBS): Tom McCarthy, Ross Tucker and Amanda Balionis
- Recap, Game Book

Game information

**First quarter**

- TEN – Cody Barton 24-yard interception return (Joey Slye kick), 11:19. Titans 7–0.
- LAC – Scott Matlock 2-yard pass from Justin Herbert (Cameron Dicker kick), 7:24. Tied 7–7. **Drive: 7 plays, 76 yards, 3:55.**
- TEN – Chimere Dike 67-yard punt return (Joey Slye kick), 2:55. Titans 14–7.

**Second quarter**

- LAC – Cameron Dicker 27-yard field goal, 14:06. Titans 14–10. **Drive: 9 plays, 56 yards, 3:49.**
- LAC – Quentin Johnston 19-yard pass from Justin Herbert (Cameron Dicker kick), 8:37. Chargers 17–14. **Drive: 6 plays, 70 yards, 3:27.**
- TEN – Joey Slye 49-yard field goal, 5:02. Tied 17–17. **Drive: 5 plays, 29 yards, 3:35.**
- LAC – Cameron Dicker 20-yard field goal, 0:20. Chargers 20–17. **Drive: 6 plays, 40 yards, 2:03.**

**Third quarter**

- No scoring plays

**Fourth quarter**

- LAC – Justin Herbert 1-yard run (Cameron Dicker kick), 12:58. Chargers 27–17. **Drive: 15 plays, 99 yards, 9:03.**
- TEN – Joey Slye 37-yard field goal, 4:19. Chargers 27–20. **Drive: 8 plays, 40 yards, 4:13.**

**Top passers**

- LAC – Justin Herbert – 19/29, 250 yards, 2 TD, INT
- TEN – Cam Ward – 12/21, 145 yards

**Top rushers**

- LAC – Justin Herbert – 9 rushes, 57 yards
- TEN – Tony Pollard – 10 rushes, 56 yards

**Top receivers**

- LAC – Oronde Gadsden II – 5 receptions, 68 yards
- TEN – Elic Ayomanor – 3 receptions, 46 yards

Despite the Chargers’ offensive line allowing Justin Herbert to be sacked a season-high six times, Herbert rebounded from a pick-six by throwing for 250 yards and two touchdowns, and added another score on the ground to lead Los Angeles to a victory over the Tennessee Titans. With their first win in Nashville since the 2009 season, the Chargers improved to 6–3.

The next day, it was announced that starting offensive tackle Joe Alt would miss the remainder of the season due to a season-ending ankle injury.

==== Week 10: vs. Pittsburgh Steelers ====
Week 10: Pittsburgh Steelers at Los Angeles Chargers – Game summary

Quarter	1	2	3	4	Total
Steelers	3	0	0	7	**10**
**Chargers**	2	10	3	10	**25**

at SoFi Stadium, Inglewood, California

- Date: November 9
- Game time: 5:20 p.m. PST
- Game weather: Clear, 70 °F (21 °C) (fixed roof)
- Game attendance: 72,174
- Referee: Brad Rogers
- TV announcers (NBC): Mike Tirico, Cris Collinsworth and Melissa Stark
- Recap, Game Book

Game information

**First quarter**

- PIT – Chris Boswell 59-yard field goal, 10:25. Steelers 3–0. **Drive: 4 plays, 5 yards, 1:39.**
- LAC – Aaron Rodgers sacked in the end zone for a safety, 5:09. Steelers 3–2.

**Second quarter**

- LAC – Cameron Dicker 32-yard field goal, 7:32. Chargers 5–3. **Drive: 13 plays, 51 yards, 5:38.**
- LAC – Ladd McConkey 15-yard pass from Justin Herbert (Cameron Dicker kick), 0:12. Chargers 12–3. **Drive: 7 plays, 38 yards, 1:57.**

**Third quarter**

- LAC – Cameron Dicker 59-yard field goal, 6:07. Chargers 15–3. **Drive: 6 plays, 36 yards, 2:32.**

**Fourth quarter**

- LAC – Kimani Vidal 2-yard run (Cameron Dicker kick), 9:26. Chargers 22–3. **Drive: 6 plays, 90 yards, 3:15.**
- LAC – Cameron Dicker 42-yard field goal, 4:54. Chargers 25–3. **Drive: 4 plays, -3 yards, 1:31.**
- PIT – Roman Wilson 27-yard pass from Aaron Rodgers (Chris Boswell kick), 2:57. Chargers 25–10. **Drive: 8 plays, 65 yards, 1:57.**

**Top passers**

- PIT – Aaron Rodgers – 16/31, 161 yards, TD, 2 INT
- LAC – Justin Herbert – 20/33, 220 yards, TD

**Top rushers**

- PIT – Jaylen Warren – 14 rushes, 70 yards
- LAC – Kimani Vidal – 25 rushes, 95 yards, TD

**Top receivers**

- PIT – Roman Wilson – 2 receptions, 35 yards, TD
- LAC – Ladd McConkey – 4 receptions, 107 yards, TD

With a convincing win over Pittsburgh, the Chargers improved to 7–3.

Keenan Allen made two receptions to reach 956 with the Chargers, surpassing Hall of Famer Antonio Gates for the most catches in franchise history.

==== Week 11: at Jacksonville Jaguars ====
Week 11: Los Angeles Chargers at Jacksonville Jaguars – Game summary

Quarter	1	2	3	4	Total
Chargers	3	3	0	0	**6**
**Jaguars**	7	7	7	14	**35**

at EverBank Stadium, Jacksonville, Florida

- Date: November 16
- Game time: 1:00 p.m. EST/10:00 a.m. PST
- Game weather: Mostly sunny, 74 °F (23 °C)
- Game attendance: 58,461
- Referee: Craig Wrolstad
- TV announcers (CBS): Spero Dedes, Adam Archuleta and Aditi Kinkhabwala
- Recap, Game Book

Game information

**First quarter**

- LAC – Cameron Dicker 41-yard field goal, 3:31. Chargers 3–0. **Drive: 9 plays, 35 yards, 4:41.**
- JAX – Bhayshul Tuten 4-yard run (Cam Little kick), 0:00. Jaguars 7–3. **Drive: 6 plays, 74 yards, 3:31.**

**Second quarter**

- LAC – Cameron Dicker 46-yard field goal, 8:15. Chargers 7–6. **Drive: 9 plays, 14 yards, 4:33.**
- JAX – Travis Etienne 2-yard run (Cam Little kick), 3:37. Jaguars 14–6. **Drive: 9 plays, 60 yards, 4:38.**

**Third quarter**

- JAX – Trevor Lawrence 1-yard run (Cam Little kick), 7:50. Jaguars 21–6. **Drive: 11 plays, 65 yards, 7:10.**

**Fourth quarter**

- JAX – Tim Patrick 1-yard pass from Trevor Lawrence (Cam Little kick), 11:38. Jaguars 28–6. **Drive: 16 plays, 76 yards, 9:18.**
- JAX – Travis Etienne 13-yard run (Cam Little kick), 11:02. Jaguars 35–6. **Drive: 2 plays, 13 yards, 0:13.**

**Top passers**

- LAC – Justin Herbert – 10/18, 81 yards, INT
- JAX – Trevor Lawrence – 14/22, 153 yards, TD, INT

**Top rushers**

- LAC – Justin Herbert – 3 rushes, 21 yards
- JAX – Bhayshul Tuten – 15 rushes, 74 yards, TD

**Top receivers**

- LAC – Keenan Allen – 4 receptions, 53 yards
- JAX – Jakobi Meyers – 5 receptions, 64 yards

The 29-point loss tied the worst defeat of Jim Harbaugh’s NFL coaching career. With their third loss to Jacksonville since 2022, the Chargers fell to 7–4 entering their bye.

==== Week 13: vs. Las Vegas Raiders ====
Week 13: Las Vegas Raiders at Los Angeles Chargers – Game summary

Quarter	1	2	3	4	Total
Raiders	0	7	0	7	**14**
**Chargers**	7	0	14	10	**31**

at SoFi Stadium, Inglewood, California

- Date: November 30
- Game time: 1:25 p.m. PST
- Game weather: Cloudy, 64 °F (18 °C) (fixed roof)
- Game attendance: 71,018
- Referee: Alex Moore
- TV announcers (CBS): Andrew Catalon, Charles Davis, Jason McCourty and AJ Ross
- Recap, Game Book

Game information

**First quarter**

- LAC – Quentin Johnston 10-yard pass from Justin Herbert (Cameron Dicker kick), 4:21. Chargers 7–0. **Drive: 14 plays, 74 yards, 8:50.**

**Second quarter**

- LV – Brock Bowers 6-yard pass from Geno Smith (Daniel Carlson kick), 1:50. Tied 7–7. **Drive: 9 plays, 82 yards, 4:42.**

**Third quarter**

- LAC – Kimani Vidal 59-yard run (Cameron Dicker kick), 14:03. Chargers 14–7. **Drive: 3 plays, 67 yards, 0:57.**
- LAC – Ladd McConkey 7-yard pass from Justin Herbert (Cameron Dicker kick), 2:23. Chargers 21–7. **Drive: 8 plays, 60 yards, 5:02.**

**Fourth quarter**

- LAC – Cameron Dicker 56-yard field goal, 14:49. Chargers 24–7. **Drive: 4 plays, 4 yards, 1:02.**
- LV – Brock Bowers 6-yard pass from Geno Smith (Daniel Carlson kick), 7:49. Chargers 24–14. **Drive: 13 plays, 65 yards, 7:00.**
- LAC – Jaret Patterson 2-yard run (Cameron Dicker kick), 1:55. Chargers 31–14. **Drive: 13 plays, 68 yards, 5:54.**

**Top passers**

- LV – Geno Smith – 18/23, 165 yards, 2 TD, INT
- LAC – Justin Herbert – 15/20, 151 yards, 2 TD, INT

**Top rushers**

- LV – Ashton Jeanty – 15 rushes, 31 yards
- LAC – Kimani Vidal – 25 rushes, 126 yards, TD

**Top receivers**

- LV – Brock Bowers – 4 receptions, 63 yards, 2 TD
- LAC – Ladd McConkey – 4 receptions, 39 yards, TD

With their fourth win against Las Vegas, the Chargers improved to 8–4 and knocked the Raiders out of playoff contention.

==== Week 14: vs. Philadelphia Eagles ====
Week 14: Philadelphia Eagles at Los Angeles Chargers – Game summary

Quarter	1	2	3	4	OT	Total
Eagles	3	3	3	10	0	**19**
**Chargers**	7	3	3	6	3	**22**

at SoFi Stadium, Inglewood, California

- Date: December 8
- Game time: 5:15 p.m. PST
- Game weather: Clear, 67 °F (19 °C) (fixed roof)
- Game attendance: 72,241
- Referee: Scott Novak
- TV announcers (ESPN/ABC): Joe Buck, Troy Aikman, Lisa Salters and Laura Rutledge
- Recap, Game Book

Game information

**First quarter**

- LAC – Omarion Hampton 4-yard pass from Justin Herbert (Cameron Dicker kick), 8:49. Chargers 7–0. **Drive: 6 plays, 80 yards, 2:49.**
- PHI – Jake Elliott 41-yard field goal, 3:22. Chargers 7–3. **Drive: 9 plays, 42 yards, 5:27.**

**Second quarter**

- LAC – Cameron Dicker 45-yard field goal, 4:55. Chargers 10–3. **Drive: 7 plays, 30 yards, 3:24.**
- PHI – Jake Elliott 30-yard field goal, 0:48. Chargers 10–6. **Drive: 11 plays, 46 yards, 3:43.**

**Third quarter**

- LAC – Cameron Dicker 34-yard field goal, 5:32. Chargers 13–6. **Drive: 16 plays, 51 yards, 9:28.**
- PHI – Jake Elliott 54-yard field goal, 3:22. Chargers 13–9. **Drive: 5 plays, 28 yards, 2:10.**

**Fourth quarter**

- PHI – Saquon Barkley 52-yard run (Jake Elliott kick), 14:51. Eagles 16–13. **Drive: 3 plays, 61 yards, 0:47.**
- LAC – Cameron Dicker 31-yard field goal, 7:26. Tied 16–16. **Drive: 7 plays, 22 yards, 3:37.**
- PHI – Jake Elliott 44-yard field goal, 2:16. Eagles 19–16. **Drive: 8 plays, 34 yards, 1:17.**
- LAC – Cameron Dicker 46-yard field goal, 0:08. Tied 19–19. **Drive: 11 plays, 43 yards, 2:08.**

**Overtime**

- LAC – Cameron Dicker 54-yard field goal, 6:24. Chargers 22–19. **Drive: 6 plays, 34 yards, 3:36.**

**Top passers**

- PHI – Jalen Hurts – 21/40, 240 yards, 4 INT
- LAC – Justin Herbert – 12/26, 139 yards, TD, INT

**Top rushers**

- PHI – Saquon Barkley – 20 rushes, 122 yards, TD
- LAC – Justin Herbert – 10 rushes, 66 yards

**Top receivers**

- PHI – A. J. Brown – 6 receptions, 100 yards
- LAC – Kimani Vidal – 1 reception, 60 yards

The Chargers capitalized on the Eagles’ sloppy play, as Philadelphia committed five turnovers, including four interceptions thrown by quarterback Jalen Hurts, with the final one intercepted by Tony Jefferson in overtime to secure a Chargers victory.

The game was primarily broadcast on ESPN, but an alternate broadcast was on ESPN2, titled Monsters Funday Football. It was a Monsters, Inc. style-animated broadcast of the game. That broadcast was also available on Disney+ and Disney XD. Mike Wazowski was on the Eagles, and Sulley was on the Chargers. Sulley was named Player of the Game; he had 3 interceptions, a touchdown, and several big runs and catches. The broadcast even flashed a graphic that read “Sullivan has the most interceptions by a monster in Monstropolis history.”

==== Week 15: at Kansas City Chiefs ====
Week 15: Los Angeles Chargers at Kansas City Chiefs – Game summary

Quarter	1	2	3	4	Total
**Chargers**	3	7	6	0	**16**
Chiefs	7	6	0	0	**13**

at Arrowhead Stadium, Kansas City, Missouri

- Date: December 14
- Game time: 12:00 p.m. CST/10:00 a.m. PST
- Game weather: Fair, 15 °F (−9 °C)
- Game attendance: 73,073
- Referee: Shawn Hochuli
- TV announcers (CBS): Kevin Harlan, Trent Green and Melanie Collins
- Recap, Game Book

Game information

**First quarter**

- KC – Patrick Mahomes 12-yard run (Harrison Butker kick), 8:52. Chiefs 7–0. **Drive: 11 plays, 68 yards, 6:08.**
- LAC – Cameron Dicker 49-yard field goal, 2:30. Chiefs 7–3. **Drive: 11 plays, 41 yards, 6:22.**

**Second quarter**

- KC – Harrison Butker 27-yard field goal, 8:04. Chiefs 10–3. **Drive: 7 plays, 10 yards, 2:55.**
- KC – Harrison Butker 47-yard field goal, 0:38. Chiefs 13–3. **Drive: 10 plays, 65 yards, 2:12.**
- LAC – KeAndre Lambert-Smith 16-yard pass from Justin Herbert (Cameron Dicker kick), 0:05. Chiefs 13–10. **Drive: 5 plays, 60 yards, 0:33.**

**Third quarter**

- LAC – Cameron Dicker 23-yard field goal, 8:55. Tied 13–13. **Drive: 11 plays, 66 yards, 6:05.**
- LAC – Cameron Dicker 49-yard field goal, 0:51. Chargers 16–13. **Drive: 5 plays, 29 yards, 2:40.**

**Fourth quarter**

- No scoring plays

**Top passers**

- LAC – Justin Herbert – 19/29, 210 yards, TD, INT
- KC – Patrick Mahomes – 16/28, 189 yards, INT

**Top rushers**

- LAC – Omarion Hampton – 15 rushes, 61 yards
- KC – Isiah Pacheco – 11 rushes, 21 yards

**Top receivers**

- LAC – Oronde Gadsden II – 4 receptions, 61 yards
- KC – Travis Kelce – 7 receptions, 70 yards

With two minutes left in the game and the Chiefs driving into Chargers territory with a chance to tie, Chiefs quarterback Patrick Mahomes suffered a non-contact injury to his left knee, later revealed to be a torn ACL, and was quickly ruled out. Backup quarterback Gardner Minshew took over and, on a game-deciding play, threw an interception to Derwin James, sealing the Chargers’ win.

With the victory, the Chargers swept the Chiefs for the first time since the 2013 season, eliminated Kansas City from playoff contention for the first time since the 2014 season, and became the first AFC West team since the 2014 Broncos to sweep the Chiefs.

==== Week 16: at Dallas Cowboys ====
Week 16: Los Angeles Chargers at Dallas Cowboys – Game summary

Quarter	1	2	3	4	Total
**Chargers**	7	14	3	10	**34**
Cowboys	7	10	0	0	**17**

at AT&T Stadium, Arlington, Texas

- Date: December 21
- Game time: 12:00 p.m. CST/10:00 a.m. PST
- Game weather: None (retractable roof closed)
- Game attendance: 92,740
- Referee: Alex Kemp
- TV announcers (Fox): Adam Amin, Drew Brees and Kristina Pink
- Recap, Game Book

Game information

**First quarter**

- DAL – Ryan Flournoy 5-yard pass from Dak Prescott (Brandon Aubrey kick), 10:20. Cowboys 7–0. **Drive: 10 plays, 79 yards, 4:40.**
- LAC – Quentin Johnston 23-yard pass from Justin Herbert (Cameron Dicker kick), 6:43. Tied 7–7. **Drive: 6 plays, 65 yards, 3:37.**

**Second quarter**

- DAL – Brandon Aubrey 33-yard field goal, 14:04. Cowboys 10–7. **Drive: 16 plays, 56 yards, 7:39.**
- LAC – Ladd McConkey 25-yard pass from Justin Herbert (Cameron Dicker kick), 9:45. Chargers 14–10. **Drive: 7 plays, 87 yards, 4:19.**
- DAL – George Pickens 38-yard pass from Dak Prescott (Brandon Aubrey kick), 8:08. Cowboys 17–14. **Drive: 4 plays, 80 yards, 1:37.**
- LAC – Justin Herbert 1-yard run (Cameron Dicker kick), 0:19. Chargers 21–17. **Drive: 16 plays, 81 yards, 7:49.**

**Third quarter**

- LAC – Cameron Dicker 37-yard field goal, 11:51. Chargers 24–17. **Drive: 6 plays, 57 yards, 3:09.**

**Fourth quarter**

- LAC – Cameron Dicker 27-yard field goal, 8:57. Chargers 27–17. **Drive: 14 plays, 76 yards, 8:18.**
- LAC – Omarion Hampton 5-yard run (Cameron Dicker kick), 4:48. Chargers 34–17. **Drive: 6 plays, 46 yards, 2:09.**

**Top passers**

- LAC – Justin Herbert – 23/29, 300 yards, 2 TD
- DAL – Dak Prescott – 21/30, 244 yards, 2 TD

**Top rushers**

- LAC – Omarion Hampton – 16 rushes, 85 yards, TD
- DAL – Javonte Williams – 9 rushes, 34 yards

**Top receivers**

- LAC – Quentin Johnston – 4 receptions, 104 yards, TD
- DAL – George Pickens – 7 receptions, 130 yards, TD

With the win and the following day’s loss by the Colts to the 49ers, the Chargers clinched a playoff berth for a second consecutive season. The Chargers finished 3–2 against the NFC.

This was the Chargers' last win until Week 10 of the 2026 season.

==== Week 17: vs. Houston Texans ====
Week 17: Houston Texans at Los Angeles Chargers – Game summary

Quarter	1	2	3	4	Total
**Texans**	14	0	3	3	**20**
Chargers	0	3	7	6	**16**

at SoFi Stadium, Inglewood, California

- Date: December 27
- Game time: 1:30 p.m. PST
- Game weather: Sunny, 61 °F (16 °C) (fixed roof)
- Game attendance: 73,066
- Referee: Craig Wrolstad
- TV announcers (KCBS/NFLN): Rich Eisen, Kurt Warner, Jamie Erdahl and Megan Olivi
- Recap, Game Book

Game information

**First quarter**

- HOU – Jayden Higgins 75-yard pass from C. J. Stroud (Ka'imi Fairbairn kick), 13:20. Texans 7–0. **Drive: 3 plays, 84 yards, 1:40.**
- HOU – Jaylin Noel 43-yard pass from C. J. Stroud (Ka'imi Fairbairn kick), 9:17. Texans 14–0. **Drive: 4 plays, 72 yards, 2:02.**

**Second quarter**

- LAC – Cameron Dicker 27-yard field goal, 6:10. Texans 14–3. **Drive: 6 plays, 28 yards, 2:38.**

**Third quarter**

- HOU – Ka'imi Fairbairn 41-yard field goal, 6:04. Texans 17–3. **Drive: 7 plays, 24 yards, 3:34.**
- LAC – Oronde Gadsden II 1-yard pass from Justin Herbert (Cameron Dicker kick), 0:13. Texans 17–10. **Drive: 11 plays, 64 yards, 5:51.**

**Fourth quarter**

- HOU – Ka'imi Fairbairn 44-yard field goal, 6:29. Texans 20–10. **Drive: 7 plays, 29 yards, 4:07.**
- LAC – Omarion Hampton 5-yard run (kick failed), 3:37. Texans 20–16. **Drive: 7 plays, 75 yards, 2:52.**

**Top passers**

- HOU – C. J. Stroud – 16/28, 244 yards, 2 TD, 2 INT
- LAC – Justin Herbert – 21/32, 236 yards, TD, INT

**Top rushers**

- HOU – Woody Marks – 19 rushes, 71 yards
- LAC – Justin Herbert – 6 rushes, 37 yards

**Top receivers**

- HOU – Jayden Higgins – 2 receptions, 88 yards, TD
- LAC – Quentin Johnston – 5 receptions, 98 yards

The Chargers struggled against the Texans, and although they attempted a comeback, a potential turning point was negated by an illegal contact penalty by Tarheeb Still on a third-and-9 play in which Texans quarterback C. J. Stroud was sacked. The penalty allowed Houston to retain possession and ultimately hold on to the win.

With the loss, and the Broncos win over the Chiefs, the Chargers finished 1–3 against the AFC South (6–3 at home) and they failed to clinch the AFC West for the 16th straight year.

==== Week 18: at Denver Broncos ====
Week 18: Los Angeles Chargers at Denver Broncos – Game summary

Quarter	1	2	3	4	Total
Chargers	0	3	0	0	**3**
**Broncos**	10	0	3	6	**19**

at Empower Field at Mile High, Denver, Colorado

- Date: January 4
- Game time: 2:25 p.m. MST/1:25 p.m. PST
- Game weather: Sunny, 69 °F (21 °C)
- Game attendance: 74,801
- Referee: Clete Blakeman
- TV announcers (CBS): Jim Nantz, Tony Romo and Tracy Wolfson
- Recap, Game Book

Game information

**First quarter**

- DEN – Wil Lutz 24-yard field goal, 5:06. Broncos 3–0. **Drive: 15 plays, 81 yards, 8:52.**
- DEN – Ja'Quan McMillian 45-yard interception return (Wil Lutz kick), 3:39. Broncos 10–0.

**Second quarter**

- LAC – Cameron Dicker 30-yard field goal, 0:03. Broncos 10–3. **Drive: 12 plays, 51 yards, 2:53.**

**Third quarter**

- DEN – Wil Lutz 26-yard field goal, 10:07. Broncos 13–3. **Drive: 7 plays, 52 yards, 3:04.**

**Fourth quarter**

- DEN – Wil Lutz 41-yard field goal, 11:45. Broncos 16–3. **Drive: 4 plays, -2 yards, 1:36.**
- DEN – Wil Lutz 23-yard field goal, 2:23. Broncos 19–3. **Drive: 10 plays, 52 yards, 5:34.**

**Top passers**

- LAC – Trey Lance – 20/44, 136 yards, INT
- DEN – Bo Nix – 14/23, 141 yards

**Top rushers**

- LAC – Trey Lance – 9 rushes, 69 yards
- DEN – Bo Nix – 8 rushes, 49 yards

**Top receivers**

- LAC – Keenan Allen – 7 receptions, 36 yards
- DEN – Evan Engram – 3 receptions, 45 yards

The Chargers missed the opportunity to sweep their division for the first time in franchise history. The Chargers finished the regular season 5–1 against the AFC West and 5–3 on the road. With the loss, they fell to the No. 7 seed and were scheduled to face the New England Patriots in the Wild Card Round.

=== Standings ===
==== Division ====
AFC West
	W	L	T	PCT	DIV	CONF	PF	PA	STK
^{(1)} Denver Broncos	14	3	0	.824	5–1	9–3	401	311	W2
^{(7)} Los Angeles Chargers	11	6	0	.647	5–1	8–4	368	340	L2
Kansas City Chiefs	6	11	0	.353	1–5	3–9	362	328	L6
Las Vegas Raiders	3	14	0	.176	1–5	3–9	241	432	W1

==== Conference ====
AFC
Seed	Team	Division	W	L	T	PCT	DIV	CONF	SOS	SOV	STK
**Division leaders**
1 (Note: Denver finished ahead of New England based on common games (Denver 6–0 to New England 5–1 against: Cincinnati, Las Vegas, NY Giants, NY Jets and Tennessee).)	Denver Broncos	West	14	3	0	.824	5–1	9–3	.422	.378	W2
2	New England Patriots	East	14	3	0	.824	5–1	9–3	.391	.370	W3
3	Jacksonville Jaguars	South	13	4	0	.765	5–1	10–2	.478	.425	W8
4	Pittsburgh Steelers	North	10	7	0	.588	4–2	8–4	.503	.453	W1
**Wild cards**
5 (Note: Houston finished ahead of Buffalo based on head-to-head victory.)	Houston Texans	South	12	5	0	.706	5–1	10–2	.522	.441	W9
6	Buffalo Bills	East	12	5	0	.706	4–2	9–3	.471	.412	W1
7	Los Angeles Chargers	West	11	6	0	.647	5–1	8–4	.469	.425	L2
**Did not qualify for the postseason**
8 (Note: Indianapolis finished ahead of Baltimore based on conference record (Indianapolis 6–6 to Baltimore 5–7).)	Indianapolis Colts	South	8	9	0	.471	2–4	6–6	.540	.382	L7
9	Baltimore Ravens	North	8	9	0	.471	3–3	5–7	.507	.408	L1
10	Miami Dolphins	East	7	10	0	.412	3–3	3–9	.488	.378	L1
11 (Note: Cincinnati finished ahead of Kansas City based on conference record (Cincinnati 5–7 to Kansas City 3–9).)	Cincinnati Bengals	North	6	11	0	.353	3–3	5–7	.521	.451	L1
12	Kansas City Chiefs	West	6	11	0	.353	1–5	3–9	.514	.363	L6
13	Cleveland Browns	North	5	12	0	.294	2–4	4–8	.486	.418	W2
14 (Note: Las Vegas finished ahead of NY Jets and Tennessee based on conference record (Las Vegas 3–9 to NY Jets 2–10 and Tennessee 2–10).)	Las Vegas Raiders	West	3	14	0	.176	1–5	3–9	.538	.451	W1
15 (Note: NY Jets finished ahead of Tennessee based on strength of victory (NY Jets .373 to Tennessee .275).)	New York Jets	East	3	14	0	.176	0–6	2–10	.552	.373	L5
16	Tennessee Titans	South	3	14	0	.176	0–6	2–10	.574	.275	L2
**Tiebreakers** (Note: When breaking ties for three or more teams under the NFL's rules, they are first broken within divisions, then comparing only the highest ranked remaining team from each division.)

== Postseason ==
=== Schedule ===
Round	Date	Opponent (seed)	Result	Record	Venue	Sources
Wild Card	January 11	at New England Patriots (2)	L 3–16	0–1	Gillette Stadium	Recap

=== Game summaries ===
==== AFC Wild Card Playoffs: at (2) New England Patriots ====
AFC Wild Card Playoffs: (7) Los Angeles Chargers at (2) New England Patriots – Game Summary

Quarter	1	2	3	4	Total
Chargers	0	3	0	0	3
Patriots	0	6	3	7	16

at Gillette Stadium, Foxborough, Massachusetts

- Date: January 11, 2026
- Game time: 8:15 p.m. EST/5:15 p.m. PST
- Game weather: Clear, 35 °F (2 °C)
- Game attendance: 64,628
- Referee: Ron Torbert
- TV announcers (NBC): Mike Tirico, Cris Collinsworth, and Melissa Stark
- Recap, Game Book

Game information

First quarter

- No scoring plays

Second quarter

- NE – Andres Borregales 23-yard field goal, 13:32. Patriots 3–0. Drive: 14 plays, 93 yards, 6:40.
- LAC – Cameron Dicker 21-yard field goal, 6:52. Tied 3–3. Drive: 11 plays, 69 yards, 6:40.
- NE – Andres Borregales 35-yard field goal, 0:02. Patriots 6–3. Drive: 5 plays, 37 yards, 0:29.

Third quarter

- NE – Andres Borregales 39-yard field goal, 1:34. Patriots 9–3. Drive: 8 plays, 64 yards, 3:36.

Fourth quarter

- NE – Hunter Henry 28-yard pass from Drake Maye (Andres Borregales kick), 9:45. Patriots 16–3. Drive: 7 plays, 80 yards, 4:16.

Top passers

- LAC – Justin Herbert – 19/31, 159 yards
- NE – Drake Maye – 17/29, 268 yards, TD, INT

Top rushers

- LAC – Justin Herbert – 10 rushes, 57 yards
- NE – Drake Maye – 10 rushes, 66 yards

Top receivers

- LAC – Ladd McConkey – 3 receptions, 32 yards
- NE – Rhamondre Stevenson – 3 receptions, 75 yards

With their first loss to New England since 2021, the Chargers extended their playoff losing streak to the Patriots to four straight and secured their third wild card loss in four seasons.
