= Del'Shawn Phillips =

American football player (born 1996)

No. 53 – Los Angeles Chargers
- Position: Linebacker
- Roster status: Active

Personal information
- Born: October 9, 1996 (age 30); Highland Park, Michigan, U.S.
- Listed height: 6 ft 2 in (1.88 m)
- Listed weight: 230 lb (104 kg)

Career information
- High school: Cass Technical (Detroit, Michigan)
- College: Garden City CC (2015–2016); Illinois (2017–2018)
- NFL draft: 2019: undrafted

Career history
- Atlanta Falcons (2019)*; Buffalo Bills (2019–2020); New York Jets (2021); Baltimore Ravens (2022–2023); Houston Texans (2024); Los Angeles Chargers (2025–present)
- * Offseason or practice squad member only

Awards and highlights
- Second-team All-Pro (2025)

Career NFL statistics as of Week 5, 2026
- Total tackles: 142
- Sacks: 2.0
- Forced fumbles: 1
- Fumble recoveries: 3
- Stats at Pro Football Reference

Del'Shawn Phillips (born October 9, 1996) is an American professional football linebacker for the Los Angeles Chargers of the National Football League (NFL). He played college football for the Illinois Fighting Illini.

== College career ==
Phillips had committed to play college football at Western Michigan, but was ruled academically ineligible. He spent a year away from football and took online courses at Mott Community College before enrolling at Garden City Community College in Garden City, Kansas. As a freshman, he recorded 72 tackles, 12.5 tackles for loss and 7.0 sacks. Phillips finished his sophomore season with 95 tackles as the Broncbusters won the 2016 NJCAA National Football Championship. He initially committed to transfer to Arizona for the final two seasons of his eligibility, but changed his commitment to Illinois.

Phillips was named a starter at linebacker going into his first season at Illinois and finished the season as the Fighting Illini's leading tackler with 85. He was voted a team captain as a senior and again led the team with 95 tackles and also interceptions with four and was named honorable mention All-Big Ten Conference.

== Professional career ==
Pre-draft measurables
Height	Weight	Arm length	Hand span	Wingspan	40-yard dash	10-yard split	20-yard split	20-yard shuttle	Three-cone drill	Vertical jump	Broad jump	Bench press
6 ft 0 1/2 in (1.84 m)	225 lb (102 kg)	33 1/4 in (0.84 m)	10 in (0.25 m)	6 ft 8 3/4 in (2.05 m)	4.61 s	1.68 s	2.70 s	4.52 s	7.11 s	37.0 in (0.94 m)	10 ft 1 in (3.07 m)	20 reps
All values from Pro Day

=== Atlanta Falcons ===
Phillips was signed by the Atlanta Falcons as an undrafted free agent on April 29, 2019. On August 31, he was waived during final roster cuts.

=== Buffalo Bills ===
On October 30, 2019, Phillips was signed to the Buffalo Bills' practice squad. He spent the remainder of the season on the practice squad. On January 6, 2020, Phillips signed a futures contract with the team.

On September 13, Phillips made his NFL debut in the Bills' season opener against the New York Jets and suffered a quadriceps injury. He was placed on injured reserve on October 12, activated on November 7, and placed back on injured reserve on November 13.

On January 19, 2021, Phillips was waived by the Bills. He played in two games with the Bills, all 14 of his snaps coming on special teams.

=== New York Jets ===
On March 23, 2021, Phillips signed with the Jets. On August 31, he was waived by the Jets and re-signed to the practice squad the following day. He was promoted to the active roster on September 21.

On August 30, 2022, Phillips was waived by the Jets as part of final roster cuts.

=== Baltimore Ravens ===
On August 31, 2022, Phillips was claimed off waivers by the Baltimore Ravens. On March 19, 2023, Phillips re–signed on a one-year deal with the Ravens.

=== Houston Texans ===
On March 15, 2024, Phillips signed a one-year contract with the Houston Texans as an unrestricted free agent.

=== Los Angeles Chargers ===
On March 14, 2025, Phillips signed a one-year, $2 million contract with the Los Angeles Chargers. On August 26, he was released by the Chargers as part of final roster cuts and re-signed the following day when cornerback Eric Rogers was placed on injured reserve.

On March 11, 2026, Phillips re-signed with the Chargers on a two-year, $7.5 million contract.

== NFL career statistics ==
Legend
**Bold**	Career high

=== Regular season ===
Year	Team	Games		Tackles					Interceptions						Fumbles				
Year	Team	GP	GS	Cmb	Solo	Ast	Sck	TFL	Int	Yds	Avg	Lng	TD	PD	FF	Fum	FR	Yds	TD
2020	BUF	2	0	0	0	0	0.0	0	0	0	0.0	0	0	0	0	0	0	0	0
2021	NYJ	**17**	**1**	31	11	20	**1.0**	**2**	0	0	0.0	0	0	0	0	0	**1**	**34**	0
2022	BAL	16	0	5	3	2	0.0	0	0	0	0.0	0	0	0	0	0	0	0	0
2023	BAL	**17**	**1**	24	11	13	0.0	1	0	0	0.0	0	0	0	**1**	0	**1**	0	0
2024	HOU	17	0	16	8	8	0.0	1	0	0	0.0	0	0	0	0	0	0	0	0
2025	LAC	**17**	**1**	**37**	**16**	**21**	**1.0**	1	0	0	0.0	0	0	0	0	0	**1**	0	0
2026	LAC	5	5	29	12	17	0.0	0	0	0	0.0	0	0	0	0	0	0	0	0
Career		91	8	142	61	81	2.0	5	0	0	0.0	0	0	0	1	0	3	34	0

=== Postseason ===
Year	Team	Games		Tackles					Interceptions						Fumbles				
Year	Team	GP	GS	Cmb	Solo	Ast	Sck	TFL	Int	Yds	Avg	Lng	TD	PD	FF	Fum	FR	Yds	TD
2022	BAL	1	0	1	**1**	0	0.0	0	0	0	0.0	0	0	0	0	0	0	0	0
2024	HOU	**2**	0	**3**	**1**	**2**	0.0	**1**	0	0	0.0	0	0	0	0	0	0	0	0
2025	LAC	1	0	2	**1**	1	0.0	0	0	0	0.0	0	0	0	0	0	0	0	0
Career		4	0	6	3	3	0.0	1	0	0	0.0	0	0	0	0	0	0	0	0
