= R. J. Mickens =

American football player (born 2001)

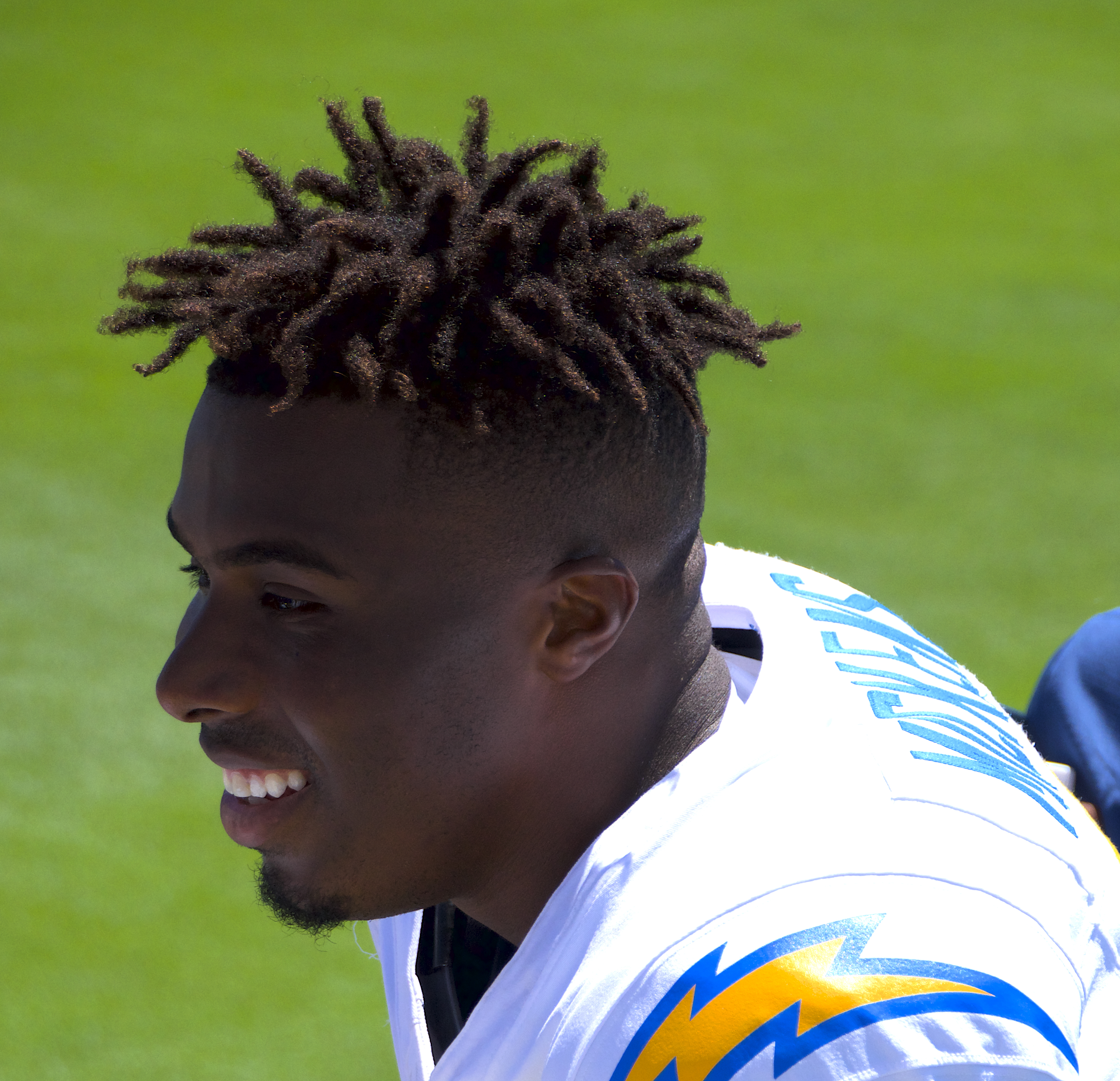
- Mickens with the Los Angeles Chargers in 2026

No. 27 – Los Angeles Chargers
- Position: Safety
- Roster status: Active

Personal information
- Born: July 10, 2001 (age 25); Irving, Texas, U.S.
- Listed height: 6 ft 0 in (1.83 m)
- Listed weight: 210 lb (95 kg)

Career information
- High school: Carroll (Southlake, Texas)
- College: Clemson (2020–2024)
- NFL draft: 2025: 6th round, 214th overall pick

Career history
- Los Angeles Chargers (2025–present)

Career NFL statistics as of Week 5, 2026
- Total tackles: 38
- Pass deflections: 2
- Interceptions: 2
- Stats at Pro Football Reference

R. J. Mickens (born July 10, 2001) is an American professional football safety for the Los Angeles Chargers of the National Football League (NFL). He played college football for the Clemson Tigers and was selected by the Chargers in the sixth round of the 2025 NFL draft.

== Early life ==
Mickens attended Carroll High School in Southlake, Texas, where he played both sides of the ball on the football team. On offense he rushed for 39 yards and two touchdowns, while also bringing in 61 receptions for 1,092 yards and 14 touchdowns. On defense Mickens notched 211 tackles with six going for a loss, two sacks, 32 pass deflections, eight interceptions, two fumble recoveries, and eight forced fumbles. He committed to play college football for the Clemson Tigers over others schools such as Alabama, Ohio State, Oklahoma, and Texas A&M.

== College career ==
As a freshman at Clemson University in 2020, Mickens had one tackle. In week 2 of the 2021 season, he had his first career interceptions, as helped Clemson beat South Carolina State. Mickens finished the 2021 season with 29 tackles with 0.5 tackle being for a loss, and two interceptions. In the 2022 regular season finale, he had a big goal line tackle and an interception, but he was ejected due to targeting in the third quarter, as the Tigers fell to their rival South Carolina. Mickens finished the 2022 season with 48 tackles with three going for a loss, two pass deflections, and three interceptions. He was named Preseason Third-Team All-American by Pro Football Focus for the 2023 season.

=== College statistics ===
| Year | Team | Class | GP | Tackles | | | | | Interceptions | | | | | Fumbles | |
| Year | Team | Class | GP | Solo | Ast | Tot | Loss | Sk | Int | Yds | Avg | TD | PD | FF | FR |
|---|---|---|---|---|---|---|---|---|---|---|---|---|---|---|---|
| 2020 | Clemson | FR | 1 | 1 | 0 | 1 | 0.0 | 0.0 | 0 | 0 | 0.0 | 0 | 0 | 0 | 0 |
| 2021 | Clemson | SO | 13 | 13 | 16 | 29 | 0.5 | 0.0 | 2 | 37 | 18.5 | 0 | 0 | 0 | 0 |
| 2022 | Clemson | JR | 13 | 26 | 22 | 48 | 3.0 | 0.0 | 3 | 0 | 0.0 | 0 | 2 | 0 | 0 |
| 2023 | Clemson | SR | 11 | 28 | 14 | 42 | 4.0 | 0.0 | 0 | 0 | 0.0 | 0 | 3 | 0 | 1 |
| 2024 | Clemson | SR | 13 | 44 | 31 | 75 | 6.0 | 0.0 | 2 | 6 | 3.0 | 0 | 7 | 0 | 0 |
| Career | | | 60 | 112 | 84 | 196 | 14.0 | 0.0 | 7 | 43 | 6.1 | 0 | 12 | 1 | 0 |

== Professional career ==
Pre-draft measurables
| Height | Weight | Arm length | Hand span | Wingspan | 40-yard dash | 10-yard split | 20-yard split | Vertical jump | Broad jump | Bench press |
|---|---|---|---|---|---|---|---|---|---|---|
| 6 ft 0 in (1.83 m) | 199 lb (90 kg) | 32 1/4 in (0.82 m) | 8 7/8 in (0.23 m) | 6 ft 5 5/8 in (1.97 m) | 4.49 s | 1.55 s | 2.65 s | 41.5 in (1.05 m) | 10 ft 1 in (3.07 m) | 17 reps |
All values from NFL Combine/Pro Day

Mickens was selected by the Los Angeles Chargers with the 214th overall pick in the sixth round of the 2025 NFL draft.

== NFL career statistics ==
=== Regular season ===
| Year | Team | Games | | Tackles | | | | | Interceptions | | | | | | Fumbles | | | | |
| Year | Team | GP | GS | Cmb | Solo | Ast | Sck | TFL | Int | Yds | Avg | Lng | TD | PD | FF | Fum | FR | Yds | TD |
|---|---|---|---|---|---|---|---|---|---|---|---|---|---|---|---|---|---|---|---|
| 2025 | LAC | 12 | 6 | 29 | 18 | 11 | 0.0 | 0 | 2 | 25 | 12.5 | 15 | 0 | 2 | 0 | 0 | 0 | 0 | 0 |
| 2026 | LAC | 4 | 1 | 9 | 6 | 3 | 0.0 | 0 | 0 | 0 | 0.0 | 0 | 0 | 0 | 0 | 0 | 0 | 0 | 0 |
| Career | | 16 | 7 | 38 | 24 | 14 | 0.0 | 0 | 2 | 25 | 12.5 | 15 | 0 | 2 | 0 | 0 | 0 | 0 | 0 |

=== Postseason ===
| Year | Team | Games | | Tackles | | | | | Interceptions | | | | | | Fumbles | | | | |
| Year | Team | GP | GS | Cmb | Solo | Ast | Sck | TFL | Int | Yds | Avg | Lng | TD | PD | FF | Fum | FR | Yds | TD |
|---|---|---|---|---|---|---|---|---|---|---|---|---|---|---|---|---|---|---|---|
| 2025 | LAC | 1 | 0 | 2 | 2 | 0 | 0.0 | 0 | 0 | 0 | 0.0 | 0 | 0 | 0 | 0 | 0 | 0 | 0 | 0 |
| Career | | 1 | 0 | 2 | 2 | 0 | 0.0 | 0 | 0 | 0 | 0.0 | 0 | 0 | 0 | 0 | 0 | 0 | 0 | 0 |

== Personal life ==
Mickens is the son of former NFL cornerback Ray Mickens.
