= Quentin Johnston =

American football player (born 2001)

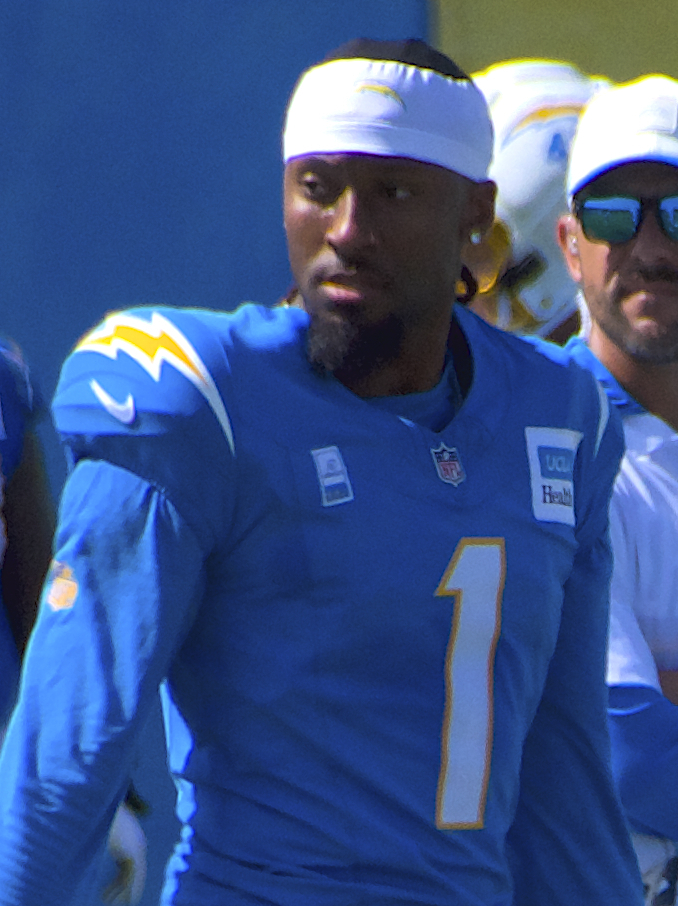
- Johnston in 2026

No. 1 – Los Angeles Chargers
- Position: Wide receiver
- Roster status: Active

Personal information
- Born: September 6, 2001 (age 25); Temple, Texas, U.S.
- Listed height: 6 ft 2 in (1.88 m)
- Listed weight: 208 lb (94 kg)

Career information
- High school: Temple
- College: TCU (2020–2022)
- NFL draft: 2023: 1st round, 21st overall pick

Career history
- Los Angeles Chargers (2023–present)

Awards and highlights
- 2× first-team All-Big 12 (2021, 2022)

Career NFL statistics as of Week 9, 2026
- Receptions: 158
- Receiving yards: 2,143
- Receiving touchdowns: 19
- Stats at Pro Football Reference

Quentin Johnston (born September 6, 2001), is an American professional football wide receiver for the Los Angeles Chargers of the National Football League (NFL). He played college football for the TCU Horned Frogs and was selected by the Chargers in the first round of the 2023 NFL draft.

== Early life ==
Johnston grew up in Temple, Texas, and attended Temple High School. He was rated a four-star recruit and initially committed to play college football at Texas. Johnston later flipped his commitment to TCU, citing the dismissal of Texas wide receivers coach Drew Mehringer as the reason.

== College career ==
Johnston became a starter at TCU as a true freshman, catching 22 passes for a team-high 487 yards and two touchdowns. His 22.1 average yards per catch was the highest by a true freshman in the history of the Big 12 Conference. Johnston was named first team All-Big 12 as a sophomore after catching 33 passes and leading TCU with 612 receiving yards and six touchdown receptions. On January 16, 2023, Johnston announced that he would forgo his senior season and enter the 2023 NFL draft.

== Professional career ==
Pre-draft measurables
Height	Weight	Arm length	Hand span	Wingspan	40-yard dash	10-yard split	20-yard split	20-yard shuttle	Three-cone drill	Vertical jump	Broad jump
6 ft 2 3/4 in (1.90 m)	208 lb (94 kg)	33 5/8 in (0.85 m)	9 5/8 in (0.24 m)	6 ft 9 5/8 in (2.07 m)	4.52 s	1.59 s	2.61 s	4.28 s	7.31 s	40.5 in (1.03 m)	11 ft 2 in (3.40 m)
All values from NFL Combine/Pro Day

Johnston was selected by the Los Angeles Chargers with the 21st overall pick in the 2023 NFL draft. On May 11, 2023, Johnston signed a 4-year fully guaranteed rookie contract worth $14,188,786, which included a $7,319,116 signing bonus.

=== 2023 ===
Johnston recorded his first career touchdown on a 1-yard reception from Justin Herbert in a week 10, 38–41 loss against the Detroit Lions. His second came on a 6-yard reception from backup quarterback Easton Stick in a week 15, 21–63 loss to the Las Vegas Raiders. He finished his rookie season with 38 receptions for 431 yards and two touchdowns in 17 games and ten starts.

=== 2024 ===
In week 2, Johnston scored two receiving touchdowns in the 26–3 win over the Carolina Panthers. In week 18, he secured 13 passes with a total of 186 yards in a 34–20 win over the Las Vegas Raiders. In the 2024 season, he finished with 55 receptions for 711 yards and eight touchdowns.

=== 2025 ===
In week 16, Johnston secured 4 passes with a total of 104 yards, highlighted by a 23-yard one-handed touchdown reception in a 34-17 win over the Dallas Cowboys. The touchdown made Johnston the first Chargers player since Antonio Gates to score eight or more touchdowns in consecutive seasons. In the 2025 season, he finished with 51 receptions for 735 yards and eight touchdowns.

=== 2026 ===
On April 28, 2026, the Chargers picked up the fifth-year option of Johnston's rookie contract.

== Career statistics ==
Legend
**Bold**	Career high

=== NFL ===
==== Regular season ====
Year	Team	Games		Receiving					Rushing					Fumbles	
Year	Team	GP	GS	Rec	Yds	Avg	Lng	TD	Att	Yds	Y/A	Lng	TD	Fum	Lost
2023	LAC	17	10	38	431	11.3	57	2	3	**9**	**3.0**	**6**	0	0	0
2024	LAC	15	11	**55**	711	12.9	**66**	**8**	3	6	2.0	4	0	0	0
2025	LAC	14	10	51	**735**	14.4	60	**8**	2	7	3.5	9	0	1	0
2026	LAC	8	5	14	266	**19.0**	58	1	3	8	2.7	7	0	0	0
Career		54	36	158	2143	13.6	66	19	12	30	2.7	9	0	1	0

==== Postseason ====
Year	Team	Games		Receiving					Rushing					Fumbles	
Year	Team	GP	GS	Rec	Yds	Avg	Lng	TD	Att	Yds	Y/A	Lng	TD	Fum	Lost
2024	LAC	1	1	0	0	0	0	0	0	0	0	0	0	0	0
2025	LAC	1	1	**3**	**20**	**6.7**	**9**	0	0	0	0	0	0	0	0
Career		2	2	3	20	6.7	9	0	0	0	0	0	0	0	0

=== College ===
Year	Team	GP	Receiving				Rushing			
Year	Team	GP	Rec	Yds	Avg	TD	Att	Yds	Y/A	TD
2020	TCU	9	22	487	**22.1**	2	**3**	3	1	**2**
2021	TCU	9	33	634	19.2	**6**	2	**12**	**6**	0
2022	TCU	14	**60**	**1,069**	17.8	**6**	**3**	-7	-2.3	0
Career		32	115	2,190	19.0	14	8	8	1	2
