= Scott Matlock =

American football player (born 2000)

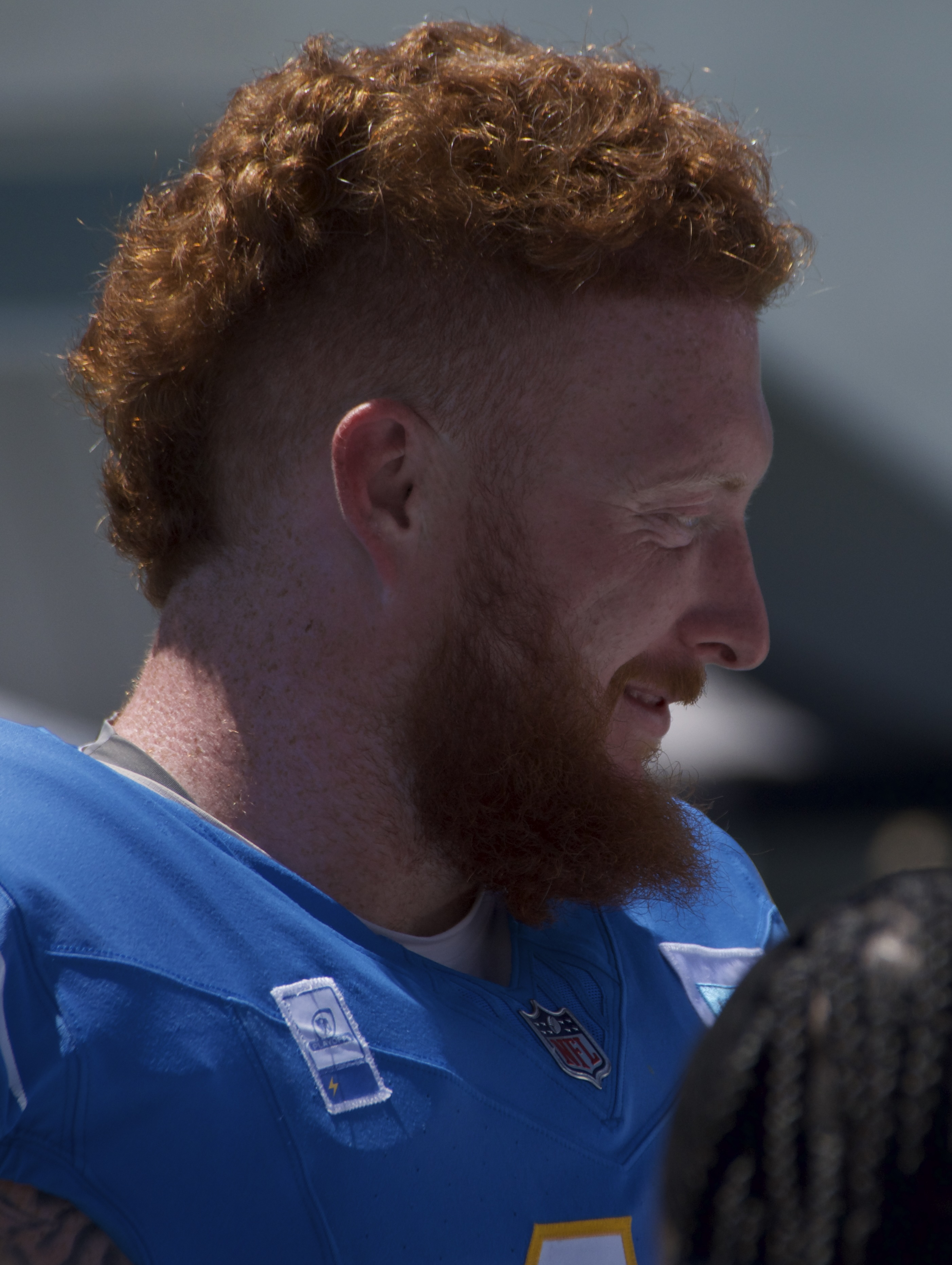
- Matlock with the Los Angeles Chargers in 2026

No. 44 – Los Angeles Chargers
- Position: Fullback
- Roster status: Active

Personal information
- Born: June 28, 2000 (age 26); Homedale, Idaho, U.S.
- Listed height: 6 ft 4 in (1.93 m)
- Listed weight: 296 lb (134 kg)

Career information
- High school: Homedale (ID)
- College: Boise State (2018–2022)
- NFL draft: 2023: 6th round, 200th overall pick

Career history
- Los Angeles Chargers (2023–present)

Awards and highlights
- 2× Second-team All-MWC (2021, 2022)

Career NFL statistics as of Week 10, 2026
- Total tackles: 22
- Sacks: 1.0
- Fumble recoveries: 1
- Pass deflections: 1
- Receptions: 8
- Receiving yards: 40
- Receiving touchdowns: 1
- Stats at Pro Football Reference

Scott Matlock (born June 28, 2000) is an American professional football fullback for the Los Angeles Chargers of the National Football League (NFL). He played college football for the Boise State Broncos. Matlock was drafted with the 200th overall pick in the sixth round of the 2023 NFL draft by the Chargers.

Matlock was a defensive lineman during his collegiate career and the start of his professional career. In his second season in the NFL, he became a two-way player and began playing fullback on offense. Fullback became his primary position that season and has been his main position since. He previously had experience as a two-way player during his time at Boise where he occasionally played tight end.

== Professional career ==
Pre-draft measurables
| Height | Weight | Arm length | Hand span | Wingspan | 40-yard dash | 10-yard split | 20-yard split | 20-yard shuttle | Three-cone drill | Vertical jump | Broad jump | Bench press |
|---|---|---|---|---|---|---|---|---|---|---|---|---|
| 6 ft 4 1/8 in (1.93 m) | 308 lb (140 kg) | 32 3/4 in (0.83 m) | 9 in (0.23 m) | 6 ft 6 3/8 in (1.99 m) | 4.98 s | 1.69 s | 2.86 s | 4.59 s | 7.31 s | 29.5 in (0.75 m) | 9 ft 5 in (2.87 m) | 29 reps |
All values from Pro Day

=== 2023 ===
Matlock was drafted by the Los Angeles Chargers in the sixth round, 200th overall, of the 2023 NFL draft. In his rookie year Matlock played in 12 games and recorded 14 total tackles.

=== 2024 ===
Under new Chargers head coach Jim Harbaugh and offensive coordinator Greg Roman, Matlock became a two-way player during the 2024 NFL offseason and began playing fullback on offense while continuing to play defensive end on defense. Roman had previously used a defensive end/fullback hybrid during his tenure as the offensive coordinator of the Baltimore Ravens with Ravens player Patrick Ricard. Matlock previously had experience as a two-way player at the collegiate level, where he occasionally played tight end in addition to his primary position of defensive end at Boise State. In Matlock's first regular season game as a two-way player, he played 18 offensive snaps, 16 defensive snaps, and 14 special teams snaps in a 22-10 win against the Las Vegas Raiders during Week 1 of the 2024 NFL Season. Matlock recorded a tackle and his first career pass deflection the following week against the Carolina Panthers as the Chargers won 26-3. Matlock recorded his first career reception for seven yards in a Week 4 loss against the Kansas City Chiefs. In Week 8, Matlock recorded his first career sack against the New Orleans Saints, along with one tackle and one reception for nine yards in a 26-8 win for the Chargers.

He finished the 2024 season with four receptions on five targets for 28 yards and nine tackles, one sack, and one pass deflection. He played 362 snaps on offense, 137 snaps on defense, and 231 snaps on special teams during the 2024 season.

=== 2025 ===
In Week 9 against the Tennessee Titans, Matlock scored his first career touchdown on a two-yard reception from Justin Herbert.

=== 2026 ===
On August 30, 2026, Matlock was placed on injured reserve due to a foot injury. He was activated on October 10.

== NFL career statistics ==
Legend
| **Bold** | Career high |

=== Regular season ===
| Year | Team | Games | | Receiving | | | | | Tackles | | | | | | Fumbles | | | | |
| Year | Team | GP | GS | Rec | Yds | Avg | Lng | TD | Cmb | Solo | Ast | Sck | TFL | PD | FF | Fum | FR | Yds | TD |
|---|---|---|---|---|---|---|---|---|---|---|---|---|---|---|---|---|---|---|---|
| 2023 | LAC | 12 | 0 | 0 | 0 | 0.0 | 0 | 0 | **15** | **6** | **9** | 0.0 | **1** | 0 | 0 | 0 | 0 | 0 | 0 |
| 2024 | LAC | **17** | **11** | **4** | **28** | **7.0** | **10** | 0 | 7 | 2 | 5 | **1.0** | **1** | **1** | 0 | 0 | 0 | 0 | 0 |
| 2025 | LAC | 16 | 8 | **4** | 12 | 3.0 | 5 | 1 | 0 | 0 | 0 | 0.0 | 0 | 0 | 0 | 0 | **1** | 0 | 0 |
| Career | | 45 | 19 | 8 | 40 | 5.0 | 10 | 1 | 22 | 8 | 14 | 1.0 | 2 | 1 | 0 | 0 | 1 | 0 | 0 |

=== Postseason ===
| Year | Team | Games | | Receiving | | | | | Tackles | | | | | | Fumbles | | | | |
| Year | Team | GP | GS | Rec | Yds | Avg | Lng | TD | Cmb | Solo | Ast | Sck | TFL | PD | FF | Fum | FR | Yds | TD |
|---|---|---|---|---|---|---|---|---|---|---|---|---|---|---|---|---|---|---|---|
| 2024 | LAC | **1** | **1** | 0 | 0 | 0.0 | 0 | 0 | 0 | 0 | 0 | 0.0 | 0 | 0 | 0 | 0 | 0 | 0 | 0 |
| 2025 | LAC | **1** | 0 | 0 | 0 | 0.0 | 0 | 0 | 0 | 0 | 0 | 0.0 | 0 | 0 | 0 | 0 | 0 | 0 | 0 |
| Career | | 2 | 1 | 0 | 0 | 0.0 | 0 | 0 | 0 | 0 | 0 | 0.0 | 0 | 0 | 0 | 0 | 0 | 0 | 0 |
