= Branson Taylor =

American football player (born 2002)

No. 71 – Los Angeles Chargers
- Position: Offensive guard
- Roster status: Injured reserve

Personal information
- Born: February 13, 2002 (age 24); Lorain, Ohio, U.S.
- Listed height: 6 ft 6 in (1.98 m)
- Listed weight: 330 lb (150 kg)

Career information
- High school: Elyria Catholic (Elyria, Ohio)
- College: Pittsburgh (2020–2024)
- NFL draft: 2025: 6th round, 199th overall pick

Career history
- Los Angeles Chargers (2025–present)

Career NFL statistics as of 2025
- Games played: 1
- Stats at Pro Football Reference

Branson Taylor (born February 13, 2002) is an American professional football offensive guard for the Los Angeles Chargers of the National Football League (NFL). He played college football for the Pittsburgh Panthers and was selected by the Chargers in the sixth round of the 2025 NFL draft.

== Early life ==
He attended Elyria Catholic High School located in Elyria, Ohio. Coming out of high school, Taylor was rated as a three star recruit, where he committed to play college football for the Pittsburgh Panthers.

== College career ==
During his college career he from 2020 through 2024 played in 45 games with 21 starts. After suffering a season ending knee injury mid-way through 2024, Taylor declared for the 2025 NFL draft.

== Professional career ==
Pre-draft measurables
Height	Weight	Arm length	Hand span	Wingspan	40-yard dash	20-yard shuttle	Three-cone drill	Vertical jump	Broad jump	Bench press
6 ft 6 in (1.98 m)	321 lb (146 kg)	32 3/4 in (0.83 m)	9 3/4 in (0.25 m)	6 ft 9 3/4 in (2.08 m)	5.28 s	4.62 s	7.34 s	28.5 in (0.72 m)	8 ft 8 in (2.64 m)	25 reps
All values from NFL Combine/Pro Day

Taylor was selected by the Los Angeles Chargers with the 199th overall pick in the sixth round of the 2025 NFL draft. He was waived on August 26, 2025 as a part of final roster cuts. Taylor was released-signed to the team's practice squad the following day. On January 13, 2026, he signed a reserve/futures contract with Los Angeles.

On August 30, 2026, Taylor was placed on injured reserve due to a neck injury. He was activated on October 10.
