= Isas Waxter =

American football player (born 2001)

No. 37 – Los Angeles Chargers
- Position: Cornerback
- Roster status: Active

Personal information
- Born: September 17, 2001 (age 25); Newark, New Jersey, U.S.
- Listed height: 6 ft 1 in (1.85 m)
- Listed weight: 209 lb (95 kg)

Career information
- High school: Immaculate Conception (Montclair, New Jersey)
- College: Villanova (2019–2024)
- NFL draft: 2025: undrafted

Career history
- Seattle Seahawks (2025)*; Los Angeles Chargers (2025–present)
- * Offseason or practice squad member only

Awards and highlights
- Second-team All-CAA (2023)

Career NFL statistics as of Week 6, 2026
- Tackles: 2
- Stats at Pro Football Reference

Isas Waxter II (born September 17, 2001) is an American professional football cornerback for the Los Angeles Chargers of the National Football League (NFL). He played college football for the Villanova Wildcats. Waxter has also been a member of the Seattle Seahawks.

== Early life ==
Waxter was born on September 17, 2001, in Newark, New Jersey. He attended Immaculate Conception High School in Montclair, New Jersey, where he was twice honored as first-team all-conference and also earned first-team all-county honors in football. Waxter also competed in track and field in hurdling events. He was named second-team all-state in track. A zero-star recruit, Waxter committed to play college football for the Villanova Wildcats.

== College career ==
Waxter recorded 25 tackles and pass breakup for Villanova as a true freshman in 2019, then had seven tackles and a pass breakup during the COVID-19-shortened spring 2021 season. In 2021, Waxter posted 17 tackles and a sack while appearing in all 13 games. He suffered a torn MCL in 2022 that caused him to sit out the entire season. He returned from injury in 2023 to start all 13 games while recording 26 tackles, four tackles-for-loss, three interceptions and eight pass breakups, being named second-team All-Colonial Athletic Association (CAA). In his final year, 2024, Waxter won first-team All-CAA honors. He was also an honorable mention FCS All-American.

== Professional career ==
=== Seattle Seahawks ===
After going unselected in the 2025 NFL draft, Waxter signed with the Seattle Seahawks as an undrafted free agent. He was waived on August 26, 2025.

=== Los Angeles Chargers ===
On September 30, 2025, Waxter signed with the practice squad of the Los Angeles Chargers. After spending the regular season on the practice squad, he was elevated to the active roster for the team's Wild Card playoff game against the New England Patriots, although he did not play in the game. He signed a reserve/future contract with the Chargers after the season, on January 13, 2026. He was waived on August 30, then re-signed to the practice squad the next day. Waxter was subsequently released from the practice squad on September 2, re–signed on September 7, released again on September 10, and re–signed again on September 15.

Waxter was elevated to the active roster for a Week 2 game against the Las Vegas Raiders but did not play in the game. He received another elevation for their Week 5 game against the Denver Broncos and made his NFL debut in the game, appearing on 13 special teams snaps. He was elevated for a third time against the Kansas City Chiefs in Week 6, appearing on 17 defensive snaps and six special teams snaps while recording two tackles. He was signed to the active roster on October 31.
