= Eddy Piñeiro =

American football player (born 1995)

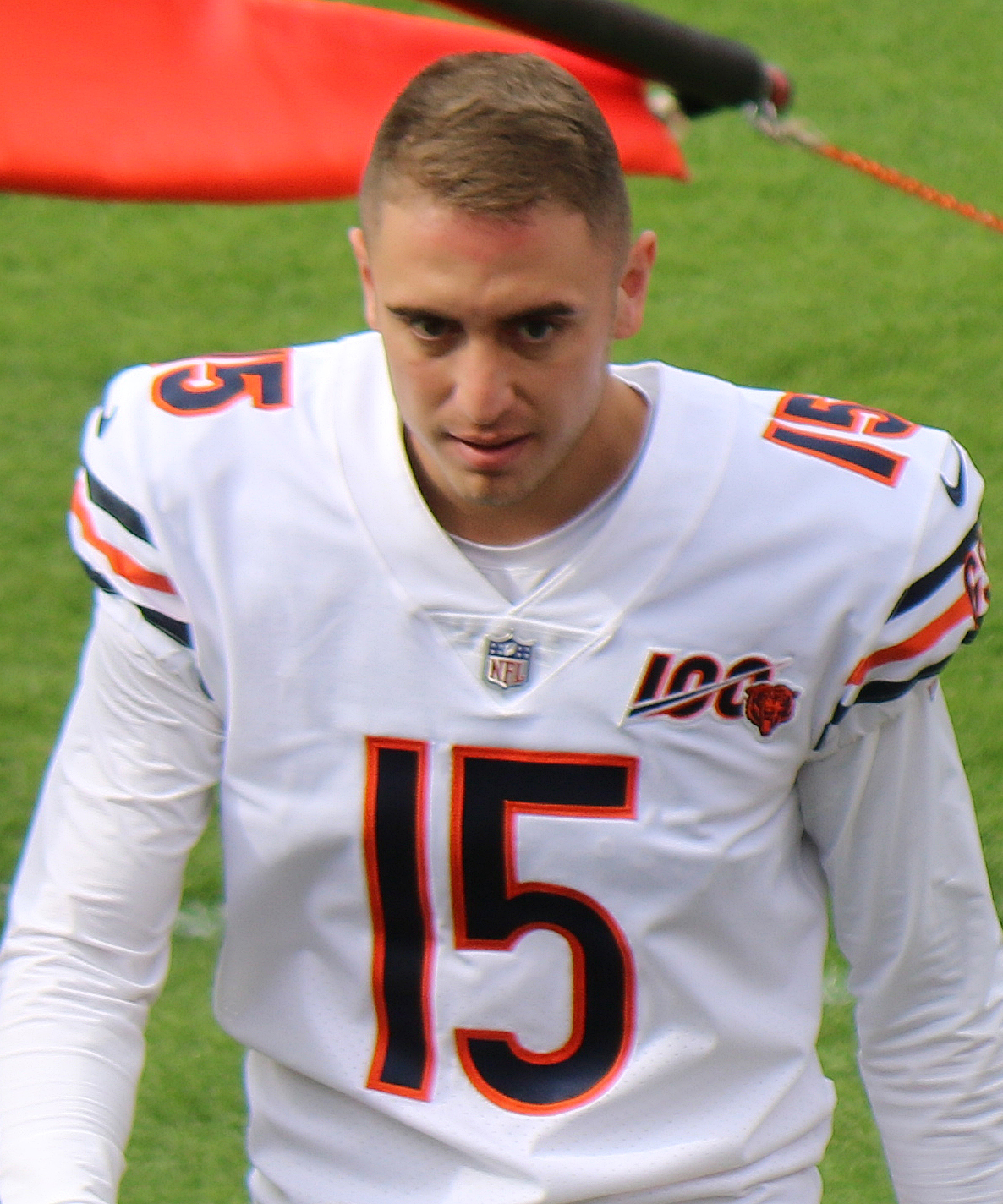
- Piñeiro with the Chicago Bears in 2019

No. 18 – San Francisco 49ers
- Position: Placekicker
- Roster status: Active

Personal information
- Born: September 13, 1995 (age 31); Miami, Florida, U.S.
- Listed height: 5 ft 11 in (1.80 m)
- Listed weight: 190 lb (86 kg)

Career information
- High school: Miami Sunset
- College: Florida (2016–2017)
- NFL draft: 2018: undrafted

Career history
- Oakland Raiders (2018); Chicago Bears (2019–2020); Indianapolis Colts (2021)*; Washington Football Team (2021)*; New York Jets (2021); Carolina Panthers (2022–2024); San Francisco 49ers (2025–present)
- * Offseason or practice squad member only

Career NFL statistics as of Week 10, 2026
- Field goals made: 147
- Field goals attempted: 166
- Field goal %: 88.6%
- Extra points made: 181
- Extra points attempted: 199
- Extra point %: 91.0%
- Points: 622
- Longest field goal: 59
- Touchbacks: 163
- Stats at Pro Football Reference

Eddy Piñeiro Jr. (/pɪnˈjɛəroʊ/ pin-YAIR-oh; (born September 13, 1995) is an American professional football placekicker for the San Francisco 49ers of the National Football League (NFL). He played college football for the Florida Gators and signed with the Oakland Raiders as an undrafted free agent in 2018. Piñeiro has also been a member of the Chicago Bears, Indianapolis Colts, Washington Football Team, New York Jets, and Carolina Panthers. He is currently third in NFL career field goal percentage at 88.6%, behind only Cameron Dicker (93%) and Justin Tucker (89.1%).

== Early life ==
Piñeiro was born on September 13, 1995, in Miami, Florida, to a Cuban father and Nicaraguan mother. His father, Eddy Sr., moved to the United States from Cuba at age nine during the Mariel boatlift of 1980 and later had a professional soccer career with the Fort Lauderdale Strikers of the ASL/APSL.

Piñeiro started off playing soccer like his father, and was a four-time All-Dade County pick in soccer. Despite having grown up only playing soccer, Piñeiro joined the Miami Sunset Senior High School football team as a senior, handling extra points and kickoffs.

== College career ==
Piñeiro signed with Florida Atlantic on a scholarship to play soccer, but academic issues prevented him from attending. Piñeiro's dad encouraged him to try on football cleats and pads, but with no football scholarship, Piñeiro went on to play soccer for a small junior college, ASA College.

In 2015, Piñeiro went to an open kicking combine at Alabama. Out of hundreds of kickers, Alabama coach Nick Saban narrowed his scholarship offers to Chris Salek and Piñeiro. Piñeiro verbally committed to Alabama, but later tried out for Florida and ultimately chose to play there. Special Teams Coordinator Marc Nudelberg was instrumental in recruiting Piñeiro to UF.

Piñeiro played for the Gators during the 2016 and 2017 seasons. During his final year at Florida, Piñeiro had the best field goal percentage in the nation, making 17 out of 18 attempts for a 94.4% conversion rate. His career conversion rate of 88.4% (38-for-43) ranks first in school history (minimum 35 attempts), surpassing Bobby Raymond (who made 43 of 49 kicks, or 87.8%, in 1983 and 1984). Piñeiro's 38 made field goals rank sixth in school history, and his streak of 16 straight made field goals to close the 2017 season tied Jeff Chandler (2001) for the second-longest streak in program history.

Piñeiro declared for the 2018 NFL draft after only two seasons with the Gators.

== Professional career ==
Pre-draft measurables
Height	Weight	Arm length	Hand span	Wingspan
5 ft 11 5/8 in (1.82 m)	185 lb (84 kg)	29 7/8 in (0.76 m)	8 1/4 in (0.21 m)	6 ft 0 5/8 in (1.84 m)
All values from NFL Combine

=== Oakland Raiders ===
Piñeiro signed with the Oakland Raiders as an undrafted free agent on May 4, 2018. He was placed on injured reserve on September 1.

=== Chicago Bears ===
==== 2019 season ====
On May 6, 2019, Piñeiro was traded to the Chicago Bears in exchange for a conditional seventh-round pick in the 2021 NFL draft, and he was one of nine participants in the Bears' 2019 summer kicking competition to replace Cody Parkey. The tryout was planned by coach Matt Nagy to find a new kicker in the wake of the Bears' "Double-Doink" loss to the Philadelphia Eagles during the Wild Card Round of the playoffs, when Parkey missed the game-winning field goal when the ball hit the upright and then bounced off the crossbar before falling to the ground.

On August 24, in a preseason game against the Indianapolis Colts, Piñeiro connected on field goals from 21 yards and 58 yards while also going 2-for-2 on extra points. He finished the 2019 preseason connecting on 8 of 9 field goals and 3 of 4 extra points. Piñeiro's misses included a 48-yard field goal attempt against the Carolina Panthers on August 8 and an extra point attempt that went very wide to the left against the Tennessee Titans on August 29.

During the season-opener against the Green Bay Packers, Piñeiro made his first NFL field goal on a 38-yard kick, which ended up being the only points the Bears scored as they lost 10–3. In the next game against the Denver Broncos, Piñeiro kicked a game-winning 53-yard field goal as time expired to give the Bears a narrow 16–14 road victory. He also made a 52-yard field goal in the second quarter. Piñeiro was named NFC Special Teams Player of the Week for his performance.

During Week 8 against the Los Angeles Chargers, Piñeiro missed two out of five field goal attempts, including a potential game-winning 41-yard attempt as time expired, as the Bears narrowly lost 17–16. In the next game against the Eagles, he missed his first regular-season extra point when his second of three extra-point attempts sailed wide right during the 22–14 road loss. The following week, Piñeiro made his two other extra-point attempts in a 20–13 victory over the Detroit Lions. He had been perfect on his first 15 attempts.

During Week 11, Piñeiro missed two field goals in the Bears' three first-quarter possessions against the Los Angeles Rams and the Bears eventually lost on the road 17–7. Nagy commented that he would stick with Piñeiro as his kicker, and that he would not bring other kickers in to try out, even though Piñeiro was ranked 31st in the league in field-goal percentage at that point.

After missing an extra point but making his two field goal attempts in a Week 12 19–14 victory over the New York Giants, Piñeiro was perfect in the final five games of the season, including making all nine field goal attempts and all eight extra point attempts. During the regular season finale against the Minnesota Vikings, he was perfect on one extra point and four field goals, including the game-winning 22-yarder to secure a narrow 21–19 victory.

Piñeiro finished the 2019 season converting 23 of 28 field goals and 27 of 29 extra points.

==== 2020 season ====
After the 2019 season, both coach Matt Nagy and general manager Ryan Pace expressed confidence that Piñeiro would be the team's kicker in 2020. "For us, you all know, [kicker] was a huge, huge, big void that we had going into this year," Nagy said. "I feel pretty good that that void is filled. I feel like that's a positive from this year."

In April, the Bears announced that they had signed former Nevada kicker Ramiz Ahmed and intended for Ahmed to compete with Piñeiro for the Bears' 2020 placekicker job. Pace explained, "We see those guys competing. Look, we love Eddy, and we think his future's very bright.... But those two competing against each other is a really good thing."

On August 11, Ahmed was waived, effectively making Piñeiro the Bears' kicker for the 2020 season. However, Piñeiro struggled with a groin injury that prevented him from kicking in training camp and resulted in him being placed on injured reserve on September 8, ending his season before it even started.

=== Indianapolis Colts ===
Piñeiro signed with the Indianapolis Colts on May 17, 2021. He was waived on August 24.

=== Washington Football Team ===
Piñeiro signed with the practice squad of the Washington Football Team on September 3, 2021. He was released eight days later.

=== New York Jets ===
On December 6, 2021, Piñeiro signed with the New York Jets. He went on to go 8-for-8 on field goals and 9-for-10 on extra points and received a restricted free agent tender in 2022.

On August 23, 2022, Piñeiro was released.

=== Carolina Panthers ===
==== 2022 season ====
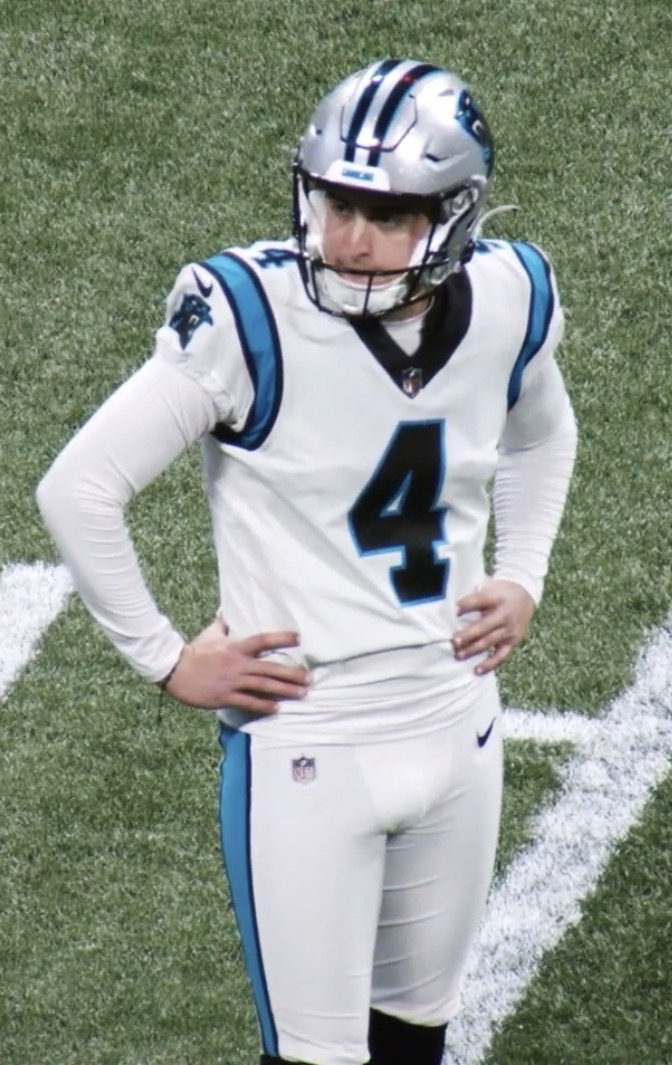
Piñeiro in 2022

On August 31, 2022, Piñeiro signed with the Carolina Panthers following an injury to Zane Gonzalez.

During Week 8 against the Atlanta Falcons, Piñeiro missed two potential game-winning kicks in the 37–34 overtime road loss. During a Week 14 30–24 road victory over the Seattle Seahawks, he had 12 points on three field goals and three extra points. Piñeiro was named NFC Special Teams Player of the Week for his performance.

==== 2023 season ====
Piñeiro re-signed with the Panthers on March 23, 2023.

Piñeiro scored a game winning field goal in Week 15 against the Falcons knocking them out of first place in the NFC South with a final score of 9–7.

==== 2024 season ====
On November 17, 2024, Piñeiro became the NFL's all-time field goal percentage leader during the Panthers' bye week. He had finished the previous week with 101 made field goals in 113 attempts, which is 89.381%. Baltimore's Justin Tucker, who has held the best field goal percentage in NFL history over most of the last 10 years, went 1-for-3 in the Ravens' game against the Steelers and his percentage fell from 89.716% to 89.348%. On December 1, Piñeiro fell out of first place to third after going 3-for-5 against Tampa Bay and falling to 88.525%, behind both Tucker and Kansas City's Harrison Butker, who became the new leader while on injured reserve, with a percentage of 89.212%.

=== San Francisco 49ers ===
==== 2025 season ====
On September 10, 2025, Piñeiro signed with the San Francisco 49ers on a one-year contract.

During a Week 2 26–21 road victory over the New Orleans Saints, Piñeiro made his 49ers debut and converted both of his field goal attempts and was two of three on extra points. In the next game against the Arizona Cardinals, Piñeiro made his lone extra point attempt, along with all three of his field goal attempts, including a game-winning 35-yard field goal as time expired to give the 49ers a narrow 16–15 victory. Two weeks later against the Rams, Piñeiro made both of his extra point attempts and all four of his field goal attempts, including a career-long 59-yarder in the fourth quarter and a game-winning 41-yarder during the 26–23 overtime road victory. Piñeiro was named NFC Special Teams Player of the Week for his performance.

During a Week 6 30–19 road loss to the Tampa Bay Buccaneers, Piñeiro made all four of his field goal attempts, including two from over 50 yards, and his lone extra point attempt. In the next game against the Falcons, Piñeiro made both of his field goal attempts, including a 55-yarder near the end of the first half, and both of his extra point attempts during the 20–10 victory. Piñeiro was named NFC Special Teams Player of the Month for October after converting all 10 of his field goal attempts and all six extra point attempts.

Piñeiro finished the 2025 season going 28-for-29 on field goals, co-leading the NFL in field goal percentage at 96.6% alongside Nick Folk. Piñeiro made his postseason debut during the Wild Card Round against the Eagles, converting his lone field goal attempt and two of three extra points in the 23–19 victory. In the Divisional Round against the Seahawks, Piñeiro made both of his field goals, converting the 49ers' only points of the 41–6 road loss.

==== 2026 season ====
On March 11, 2026, Piñeiro signed a four-year, $17 million extension with the 49ers.

== NFL career statistics ==
Legend
	Led the league
**Bold**	Career high

=== Regular season ===
General			Field goals					PATs			Kickoffs			Points
Season	Team	GP	FGM	FGA	FG%	Blck	Long	XPM	XPA	XP%	KO	Avg	TBs	Pts
2018	OAK	0	Did not play due to injury											
2019	CHI	16	23	28	82.1	0	53	27	29	93.1	52	60.4	26	96
2020	CHI	0	Did not play due to injury											
2021	NYJ	5	8	8	**100.0**	0	51	9	10	90.0	0	0.0	0	33
2022	CAR	17	**33**	**35**	94.3	0	54	30	32	93.8	83	62.0	46	129
2023	CAR	15	25	29	86.2	0	56	17	20	85.0	57	62.0	36	92
2024	CAR	17	22	26	84.6	0	53	33	35	**94.3**	72	61.9	32	99
2025	SF	14	28	29	96.6	0	**59**	**34**	**38**	89.5	79	60.8	16	118
2026	SF	9	8	11	72.7	0	57	31	35	88.6	45	62.0	7	55
Career		93	147	166	88.5	0	59	181	199	91.0	388	62.0	163	622

=== Postseason ===
General			Field goals					PATs			Kickoffs			Points
Season	Team	GP	FGM	FGA	FG%	Blck	Long	XPM	XPA	XP%	KO	Avg	TBs	Pts
2025	SF	2	3	3	100.0	0	56	2	3	66.7	8	62.9	8	12
Career		2	3	3	100.0	0	56	2	3	66.7	8	62.9	8	12

=== NFL records ===
==== 49ers franchise records ====
- Most consecutive field goals made to start a season: 18 (2025)

== Personal life ==
Piñeiro is a Christian. In 2017, he and his father, Eddy Sr., were awarded the Police Service Award from the Gainesville Police Department for helping a woman escape from a domestic abuser.

Piñeiro is the first player of Nicaraguan descent to play in the NFL. During his time with the Chicago Bears, in an October 2019 game against the Raiders in London, he received a glass sculpture as a gift from Nicaragua's ambassador to the United Kingdom.

== See also ==
- Most accurate kickers in NFL history
