= Harrison Butker =

American football player (born 1995)

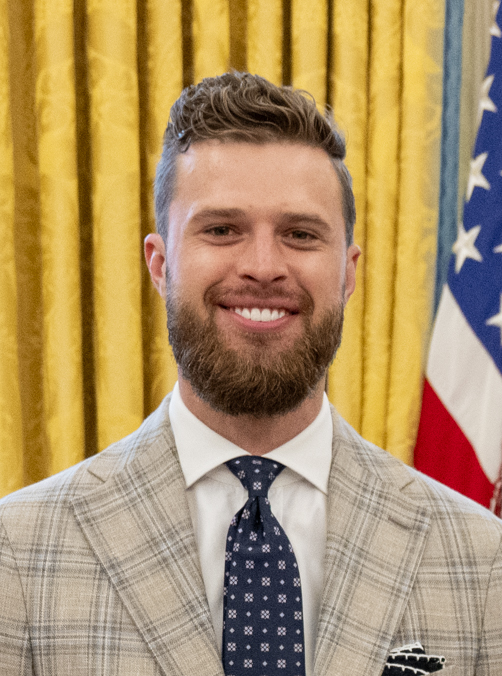
- Butker in 2025

No. 7 – Kansas City Chiefs
- Position: Placekicker
- Roster status: Active

Personal information
- Born: July 14, 1995 (age 31); Decatur, Georgia, U.S.
- Listed height: 6 ft 4 in (1.93 m)
- Listed weight: 205 lb (93 kg)

Career information
- High school: Westminster (Atlanta, Georgia)
- College: Georgia Tech (2013–2016)
- NFL draft: 2017: 7th round, 233rd overall pick

Career history
- Carolina Panthers (2017)*; Kansas City Chiefs (2017–present)
- * Offseason or practice squad member only

Awards and highlights
- 3× Super Bowl champion (LIV, LVII, LVIII); NFL scoring leader (2019); PFWA All-Rookie Team (2017); NFL records: Longest made field goal in a Super Bowl: 57 yards (LVIII); Career field goals in the Super Bowl: 9 (Note: Tied with Jake Elliott.); Field goals made by a rookie: 38 (2017)

Career NFL statistics as of Week 10, 2026
- Field goals made: 263
- Field goals attempted: 303
- Field goal %: 86.8%
- Extra points made: 396
- Extra points attempted: 421
- Extra point %: 94.1%
- Points: 1,185
- Longest field goal: 62
- Touchbacks: 511
- Stats at Pro Football Reference

Harrison Butker (born July 14, 1995) is an American professional football placekicker for the Kansas City Chiefs of the National Football League (NFL). He played college football for the Georgia Tech Yellow Jackets, and was selected by the Carolina Panthers in the seventh round of the 2017 NFL draft. With an 87.3% career field goal percentage, Butker is the fifth most accurate kicker in NFL history. (Note: Minimum 100 attempts; behind only Cameron Dicker (92.6%), Justin Tucker (89.1%), Eddy Piñeiro (88.4%), and Ka'imi Fairbairn (87.9%).) He led the NFL in scoring in 2019, and has won three Super Bowls with the Chiefs.

== Early life ==
Butker was born on July 14, 1995, to Harrison Butker Sr. and Elizabeth Keller Butker, and was raised in Decatur, Georgia. He has an older sister. Butker's maternal grandfather, James W. Keller, held faculty positions in oncology at Emory University for 28 years. His mother, Elizabeth Keller Butker, has been a clinical medical physicist at Emory since 1988.

Butker went to The Westminster Schools, where he played on the football team after picking up the sport as a sophomore. Butker broke the school record (at the time) for a field goal of 53 yards. He was a three-sport athlete in basketball, football, and soccer, winning three state championships in soccer. Butker was also a tuba player for the school's symphonic band.

== College career ==
Before pursuing football, Butker played soccer at Georgia Tech.

Butker played at Georgia Tech from 2013 through 2016 under head coach Paul Johnson. Butker is the all-time leading scorer in school history and was a captain of the team for his senior season. In his collegiate career, Butker converted 208-of-210 extra point attempts and 43-of-60 field goal attempts. He graduated with a bachelor's degree in industrial engineering.

== Professional career ==
Pre-draft measurables
Height	Weight	Arm length	Hand span	Wingspan
6 ft 3 7/8 in (1.93 m)	199 lb (90 kg)	31 3/4 in (0.81 m)	8 3/4 in (0.22 m)	6 ft 4 in (1.93 m)
All values from NFL Combine

=== Carolina Panthers ===
The Carolina Panthers selected Butker in the seventh round (233rd overall) in the 2017 NFL draft. On May 5, 2017, he signed a four-year, $2.48 million contract that included a signing bonus of $83,112. Butker was waived on September 13, and was signed to the practice squad the next day.

=== Kansas City Chiefs ===
==== 2017 season ====
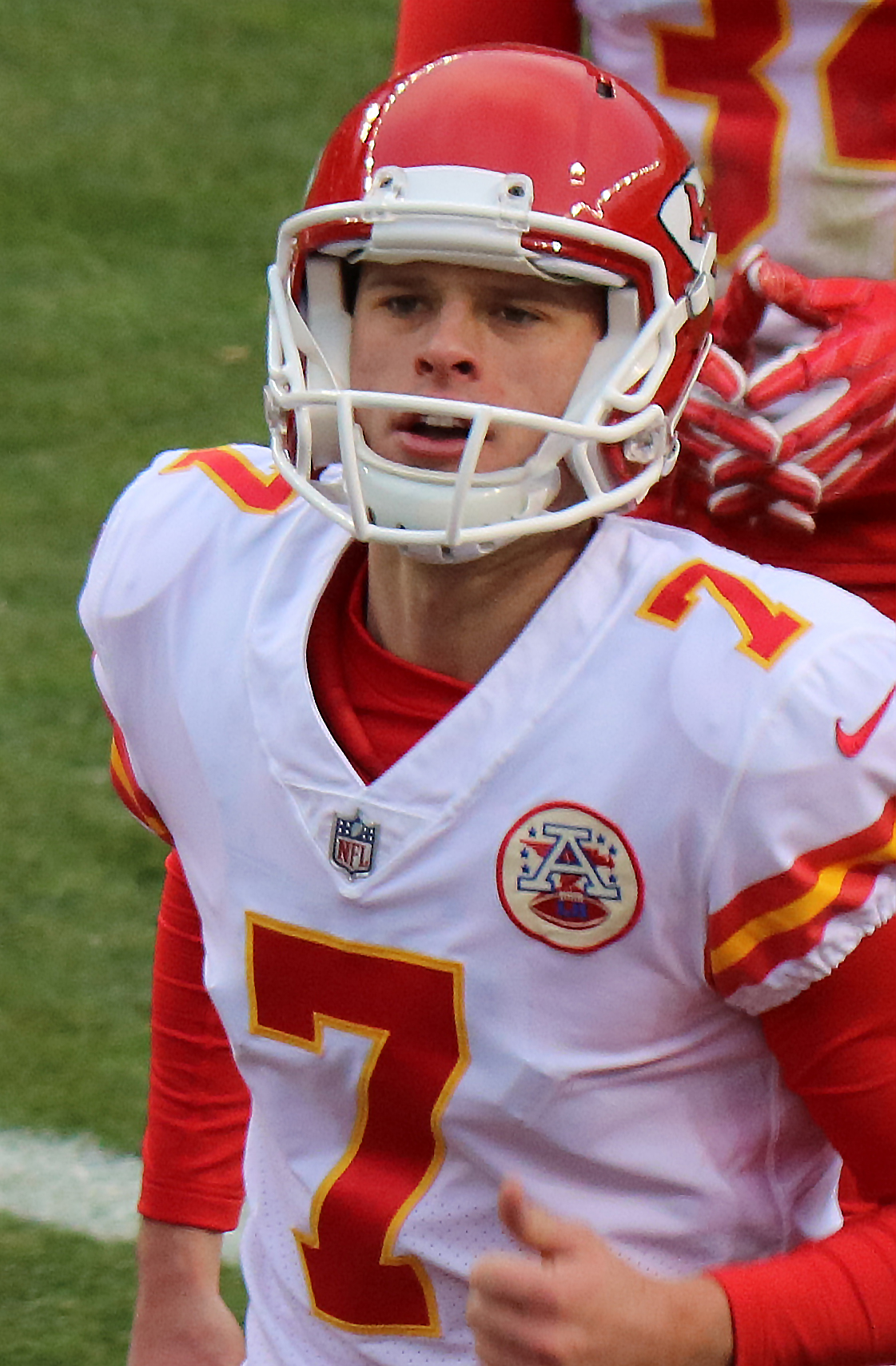
Butker in 2017

On September 26, 2017, Butker was signed by the Kansas City Chiefs off the Panthers' practice squad.

Butker made his debut during a Week 4 29–20 victory over the Washington Redskins on Monday Night Football. Butker missed his first career field goal attempt of 46 yards, but made his next three attempts, including the game-winner. In the next game against the Houston Texans, Butker made all five of his field goal attempts during the 42–34 road victory. Three weeks later against the Denver Broncos, he converted five field goals in the 29–19 victory, earning AFC Special Teams Player of the Week honors. For the month of October, he was named AFC Special Teams Player of the Month. During a Week 16 29–13 victory over the Miami Dolphins, Butker converted five field goals, earning him his second AFC Special Teams Player of the Week award.

Butker finished his rookie season converting 28 extra point attempts and 38-of-42 field goal attempts. Butker was named as an alternate to the 2018 Pro Bowl. He finished the season tied for fourth in scoring with Chris Boswell with 142 points.

==== 2018 season ====
During a Week 2 42–37 road victory over the Pittsburgh Steelers, Butker converted a career-high six extra points.

He finished his second professional season converting 65 of 69 extra point attempts and 24-of-27 field goal attempts.

==== 2019 season ====
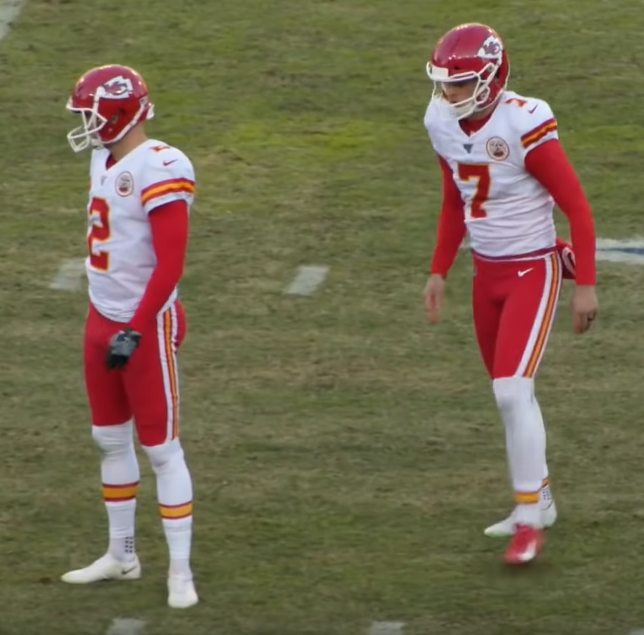
Butker (right) alongside punter Dustin Colquitt

On April 15, 2019, Butker signed his exclusive rights free agent tender with the Chiefs. The tender gave Butker a one-year contract worth $645,000. On June 13, he signed a five-year extension worth $20.3 million.

During a Week 9 26–23 victory over the Minnesota Vikings, Butker made four field goals, including a 44-yard game-winner, earning him AFC Special Teams Player of the Week honors. Butker was named the AFC Special Teams Player of the Month for November. He led the NFL in regular season field goals with 34 made field goals and finished the regular season with 45-of-48 extra points converted and 34-of-38 field goals converted.

On December 8, 2019, Butker converted his 89th field goal in his 100th career attempt, which is the minimum amount of field goal attempts to qualify for career percentage for NFL records. He finished this game against the Miami Dolphins with three field goals made in three attempts, which made him 90-for-101 in his career, for a career field goal percentage of 89.109%, which gave him the second best percentage in NFL history, trailing only Baltimore's Justin Tucker, who at that time had converted 260 field goals in 287 attempts in his career for a percentage of 90.592%.

Butker won his first Super Bowl in Super Bowl LIV. During the 31–20 victory over the San Francisco 49ers, Butker converted all four extra point attempts and his only field goal attempt, a 31-yarder in the second quarter.

==== 2020 season ====
During a Week 2 23–20 overtime victory over the Los Angeles Chargers, Butker made all three field goal attempts he had in the game, including a game tying 30-yard field goal as time expired in regulation and the game winning and franchise record tying 58-yard field goal in overtime. The longest field goal record was broken in 2022 while Butker was injured. For his performance, Butker was named AFC Special Teams Player of the Week. After his fifth missed extra point of the season in a Week 7 game against the Broncos, Butker set a career high for missed extra points in a season despite only attempting 24 extra points up to that point.

Butker finished the 2020 season converting 25-for-27 field-goal attempts and 48-for-54 on extra-point attempts. During Super Bowl LV, Butker scored all of the Chiefs' points in the 31–9 loss to the Tampa Bay Buccaneers.

==== 2021 season ====
Butker was placed on the Reserve/COVID-19 list on December 20, 2021 after testing positive for COVID-19. Due to the NFL's COVID-19 protocols, he missed the Chiefs' Week 16 game against the Steelers. It was the first game of his career Butker missed. He was activated on December 29, 2021. In the 2021 season, Butker appeared in 16 games and converted 47-of-49 extra point attempts and 25-of-28 field goal attempts.

In the divisional round against the Buffalo Bills, Butker converted a 49-yard game-tying field goal in regulation to force overtime during the 42–36 victory.

==== 2022 season ====
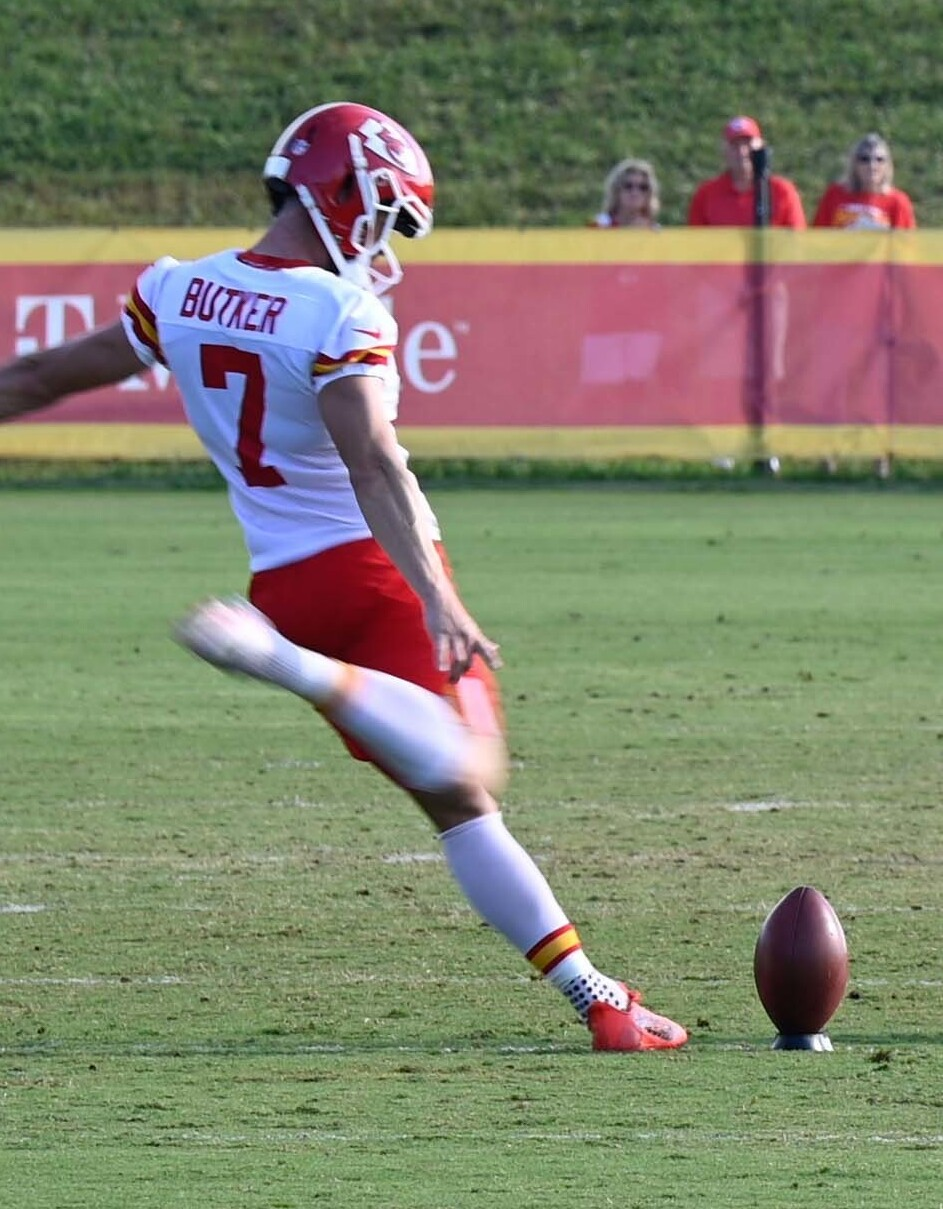
Butker during training camp in 2022

During the season-opening 44–21 road victory over the Arizona Cardinals, Butker made a 54-yard field goal and all four extra point attempts despite suffering an ankle injury. The day before the Chiefs' Week 2 game against the Chargers, he was ruled out due to the ankle injury. Butker was inactive for the Chiefs next four games. In his first game back from the injury against the Bills, Butker broke the Chiefs' franchise record for longest field goal for the second time (his previous record of 58 had been broken while he was injured) with a 62-yard field goal. It was the 15th field goal in NFL history 62 yards or longer. In his first five games after returning from injury, Butker missed an extra point or a field goal in each of those games, the longest such streak of his career. Butker ended the streak making all three field goal attempts and all three extra point attempts in Week 11 against the Chargers. Due to the injury, with the missed time and the injury causing kicking issues, Butker had what was statistically the worst season of his career. Butker had a career low field goal percentage (75%), a career high in misses (6), and a career low in attempts (24). In the AFC Championship Game, Butker hit a 45-yard game winning field goal to defeat the Cincinnati Bengals 23–20 to send the Chiefs to Super Bowl LVII. In the Super Bowl, Butker kicked a 27-yard game winning field goal with 11 seconds in the fourth quarter to give the Chiefs a 38–35 victory over the Philadelphia Eagles to win his second Super Bowl in his career.

==== 2023 season ====
Butker began the season making his first 24 field goals before his first miss in Week 15. During a Week 17 25–17 victory over the Cincinnati Bengals, Butker went 6-for-6 on field goals and was named AFC Special Teams Player of the Week for his performance. His six field goals made set a career high. Butker finished the season making 33-of-35 attempts, tying a career low for missed field goals and setting a career high in field goal percentage with 94.3%. Butker made all 12 of his attempts from over 40 yards, including his second successful field goal from over 60 yards. Butker did not miss a single extra point attempt for the second time in his career. Butker's performance in the 2023 season moved him back into second place in NFL history in career field goal percentage (minimum 100 attempts).

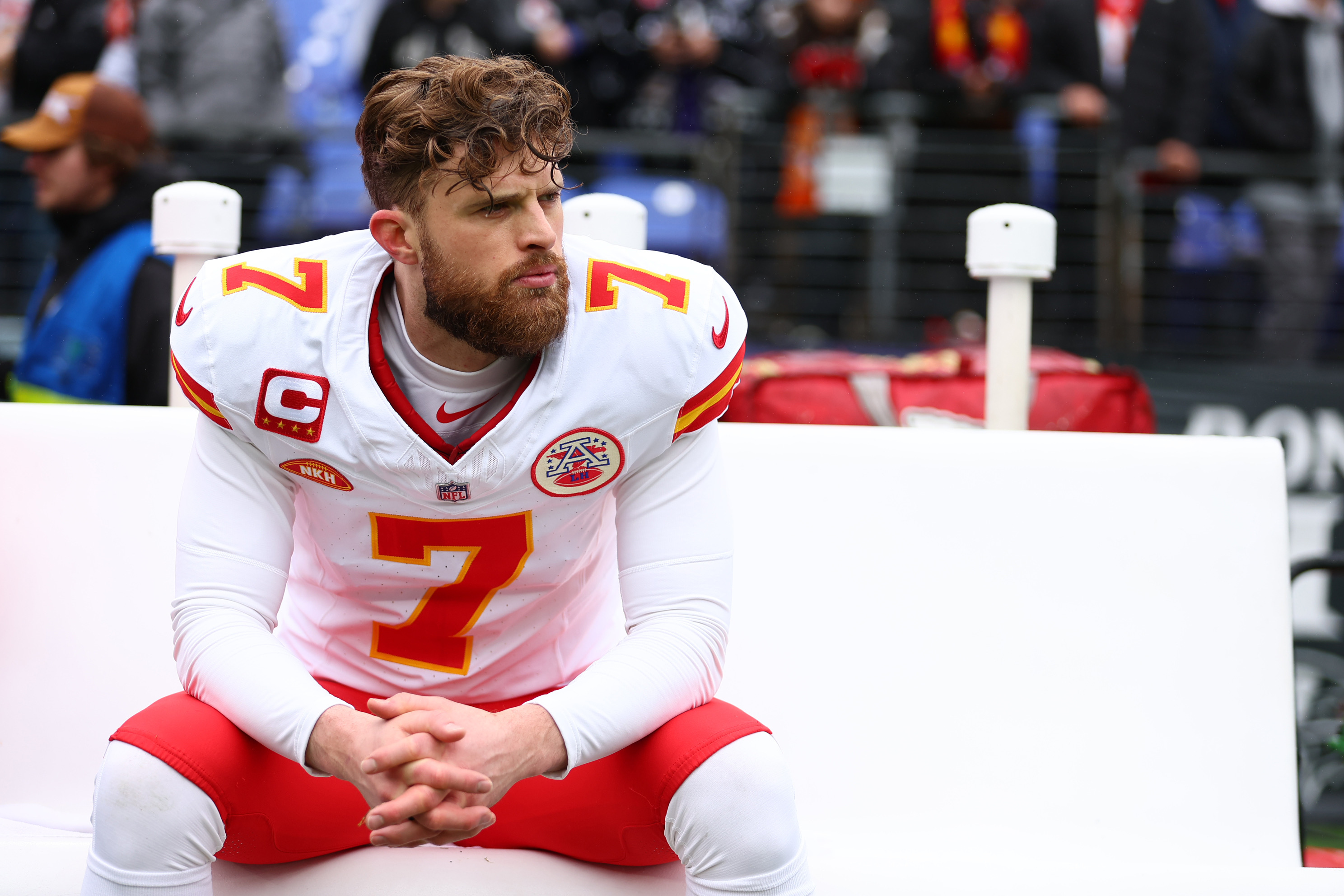
Butker in January 2024

During Super Bowl LVIII, Butker broke two Super Bowl records: longest made field goal in Super Bowl history (57) and most career field goals in the Super Bowl (9). The Chiefs won in overtime 25–22, giving Butker his third Super Bowl victory and his second consecutive victory. The win made Butker the fourth kicker in NFL history with three Super Bowl wins.

==== 2024 season ====
On August 5, 2024, the Chiefs re-signed Butker to a four-year, $25.6 million extension. On November 14, Butker suffered a knee injury during practice and was placed on injured reserve the next day. While on injured reserve, Butker moved from third to first place in all-time field goal percentage. At the time of his injury, Butker had made 215 of 241 field goal attempts for a percentage of 89.212%. He was third behind Carolina's Eddy Piñeiro (89.744%) and Baltimore's Justin Tucker (89.371%). On December 1, Piñeiro went 3-for-5 in Carolina's game against Tampa Bay to fall to 88.525% and from first to third, while Tucker also fell behind Butker, going 2-for-4 in Baltimore's game against Philadelphia, falling to 89.032%, but remaining in second behind Butker and ahead of Piñeiro. On December 14, he was activated from injured reserve. Butker held the top spot for two weeks and when he returned from injury against the Browns the next day, Butker went 0-for-1 in field goal attempts, and his percentage fell to 88.843%, falling behind Tucker, who attempted no field goals in his Week 15 game at the Giants and remained at 89.032%. Despite his struggles, the Chiefs reached Super Bowl LIX where they lost 40–22 to the Philadelphia Eagles, where Butker did not attempt a field goal or extra point.

==== 2025 season ====
Through the first five games of the season, Butker uncharacteristically missed five kicks, going 10-for-13 on field goals and 11-for-13 on extra points. His missed field goals came from 40, 56, and 58 yards. In addition to the missed field goals, Butker sent a kickoff out of bounds late in the fourth quarter against the Jaguars. Despite a rough start, Head Coach Andy Reid voiced his confidence in Butker, saying, "I’m not really worried about him." In the 2025 season, he converted 31 of 35 extra point attempts and 33 of 38 field goal attempts.

==== 2026 season ====
On August 22, Butker made a 69-yard field goal in a preseason game against the Tampa Bay Buccaneers, the second longest in NFL preseason history. Had it happened in the regular season, it would have been an NFL record, one yard longer than Cam Little's 68-yard field goal.

On October 25, against the Seattle Seahawks, Butker missed two field goals, going 1 for 3 as the Chiefs went on to lose 3–20. The Chiefs tried out and signed Justin Tucker in the following days. He also struggled in the Chiefs' win over the New York Jets, missing a kick from 56 yards that was called back due to an offside penalty before he also missed the shorter kick. Reid affirmed his support for Butker on November 11.

== NFL career statistics ==
Legend
	Won the Super Bowl
	Led the league
	NFL record (for rookies)
**Bold**	Career high

=== Regular season ===
Year	Team	GP	Overall FGs				PATs			Kickoffs		Points
Year	Team	GP	Lng	FGA	FGM	Pct	XPA	XPM	Pct	KO	TB	Points
2017	KC	13	53	**42**	**38**	90.5	28	28	**100.0**	78	61	142
2018	KC	16	54	27	24	88.9	**69**	**65**	94.2	**110**	72	137
2019	KC	16	56	38	34	89.5	48	45	93.8	98	60	**147**
2020	KC	16	58	27	25	92.6	54	48	88.9	95	72	123
2021	KC	16	56	28	25	89.3	49	47	95.9	93	61	122
2022	KC	13	**62**	24	18	75.0	41	38	92.7	68	44	92
2023	KC	17	60	35	33	**94.3**	38	38	**100.0**	85	**74**	137
2024	KC	13	53	25	21	84.0	31	29	93.5	62	49	92
2025	KC	17	59	38	33	86.8	35	31	88.6	87	13	130
2026	KC	9	50	19	12	63.2	28	27	96.4	49	5	63
Career		146	62	303	263	86.8	421	396	94.1	825	511	1,185

=== Postseason ===
Year	Team	GP	Overall FGs				PATs			Kickoffs		Points
Year	Team	GP	Lng	FGA	FGM	Pct	XPA	XPM	Pct	KO	TB	Points
2017	KC	1	–	1	0	0.0	3	3	100.0	4	1	3
2018	KC	2	39	2	2	100.0	8	8	100.0	13	5	14
2019	KC	3	31	2	2	100.0	**16**	**15**	93.8	21	10	21
2020	KC	3	52	8	7	87.5	7	6	85.7	17	12	27
2021	KC	3	49	5	4	80.0	13	12	92.3	18	13	24
2022	KC	3	50	7	6	85.7	10	10	100.0	19	12	28
2023	KC	4	**57**	**11**	**11**	100.0	8	8	100.0	**24**	**18**	**41**
2024	KC	3	36	4	4	100.0	5	5	100.0	16	10	17
Career		22	57	40	36	90.0	70	67	95.7	132	81	175

== Career highlights ==
=== Awards and honors ===
- 3× Super Bowl champion (LIV, LVII, LVIII)
- NFL scoring leader (2019)
- PFWA All-Rookie Team (2017)

=== Records ===
- Most field goals made by a rookie: 38

==== Super Bowl records ====
- Longest field goal in the Super Bowl: 57 yards (2024)
- Career field goals in the Super Bowl: 9

==== Chiefs franchise records ====
- Field goals made, season: 38 (2017)
- Points by a rookie: 142
- Points by a kicker, season: 142 (2017)
- Longest field goal: 62 yards (2022)
- Career field goal percentage (minimum 50 attempts): 89.1%

== Personal life ==
Butker meeting with Donald Trump in 2025

Butker is married with three children. He is the co-founder, president, and chief operating officer of MDKeller. One of the companies that Butker co-founded as a subsidiary of MDKeller is Shepherd's, which specializes in custom menswear.

=== Views ===
==== Religious beliefs ====
Butker is a devout Traditionalist Catholic. Butker has publicly spoken out against Traditionis custodes, saying that he felt that he and other traditionalist Catholics were "persecuted" in the Church.

==== Comments about Jews ====
In May 2024, Butker gave a commencement address at Benedictine College. The speech was met by applause and a standing ovation from the audience. Among other topics, he criticized a provision of a bill condemning antisemitism as overly broad. Butker said, "We fear speaking truth, because now, unfortunately, truth is in the minority. Congress just passed a bill where stating something as basic as the biblical teaching of who killed Jesus could land you in jail." Dave Zirin of The Nation condemned Butker's comments as antisemitic. Yvette Walker of the Kansas City Star also criticized Butker's speech.

==== Comments about women in the workforce ====
Butker was the commencement speaker at his alma mater, Georgia Tech, in 2023. Butker received widespread attention for his exhortation to "get married and start a family." During Butker's 2024 address at Benedictine College, he said:

I think it is you, the women, who have had the most diabolical lies told to you. How many of you are sitting here now about to cross this stage and are thinking about all the promotions and titles you are going to get in your career? Some of you may go on to lead successful careers in the world, but I would venture to guess that the majority of you are most excited about your marriage and the children you will bring into this world...I'm on the stage today and able to be the man I am because I have a wife who leans into her vocation...and embrace one of the most important titles of all: homemaker. I can tell you that my beautiful wife Isabelle would be the first to say that her life truly started when she started living her vocation as a wife and as a mother.

Several articles highlighted that Butker's mother, Elizabeth Keller Butker, has been a clinical medical physicist at Emory University and holds two university degrees. (Note: Attributed to multiple references:) His speech, which included other personal and political opinions, was met with controversy. (Note: Attributed to multiple references:) On May 15, 2024, in response to Butker's comments and the ensuant backlash, NFL senior vice president and chief diversity and inclusion officer Jonathan Beane told People in a written statement: "His views are not those of the NFL as an organization. The NFL is steadfast in our commitment to inclusion, which only makes our league stronger." Outsports wrote, "One of the worst parts of this NFL player's awful speech is that he quoted a Taylor Swift song before telling women they should be homemakers and serve their man's career." On his New Heights podcast, Travis Kelce said that he did not agree with "just about any" of Butker's views but did "cherish" him as a teammate.

Others were supportive of Butker's remarks. Hunter Estes, communications director for Mississippi governor Tate Reeves, tweeted a portion of Butker's message, "Be unapologetic in your masculinity. Fight against the cultural emasculation of men. Do hard things. Never settle for what is easy", and added, "This is indeed a brave and rebellious message for our current age. The world needs more good men like Harrison Butker." Tavia Hunt, the director of the Kansas City Chiefs Women's Organization and wife of Chiefs CEO Clark Hunt, wrote on Instagram, "Affirming motherhood and praising your wife, as well as highlighting the sacrifice and dedication it takes to be a mother, is not bigoted. It is empowering to acknowledge that a woman's hard work in raising children is not in vain."

==== Anti-abortion advocacy ====
Butker supported the failed 2022 Kansas Value Them Both Amendment, which would have overridden a 2019 Kansas Supreme Court ruling that the Kansas constitution guarantees the right to abortion. In 2023, Butker wore an anti-abortion tie while attending the Chiefs' Super Bowl LVII victory celebration at The White House in protest of President Joe Biden's pro-choice views.

==== Anti-LGBTQ comments ====
In a March 2024 interview with the Catholic News Agency, Butker condemned the Catholic Church for burying the recently deceased transgender rights advocate Cecilia Gentili. In his 2024 commencement speech to Benedictine College, while advocating for a more conservative form of Catholicism, he called Pride Month an example of the "deadly sins". Former Kansas City commissioner Justice Horn criticized Butker, writing that he "doesn't represent Kansas City nor has he ever. Kansas City has always been a place that welcomes, affirms and embraces our LGBTQ+ community members."

==== Political beliefs ====
Butker's 2024 address to the graduating class of Benedictine College covered a number of his political beliefs. In the speech, Butker condemned President Biden's stance on abortion. He also attacked Biden's response to the COVID-19 pandemic, IVF, surrogacy, the LGBTQ community and Pride Month, women in the workforce, diversity, equity, and inclusion, and a bill condemning antisemitism.

On October 11, 2024, Butker endorsed former president Donald Trump for the 2024 United States presidential election. He cited Trump's anti-abortion record as his reason for endorsing him. Butker is a member of the Trump-appointed President's Council on Sports, Fitness, and Nutrition.

Butker founded Upright PAC, a political action committee hoping to "reclaim the traditional values that have made this country great", in October 2024. The PAC raised $4,023 in the first six months of 2025, much of which went to a political consultant at MDKeller. A November 2026 report by The Kansas City Star noted Upright was still registered as active by the Federal Election Commission, but OpenSecrets said it "has not raised enough money to be a functioning PAC" and did not donate to political candidates.

== See also ==
- Most accurate kickers in NFL history
