= Chris Boswell =

American football player (born 1991)

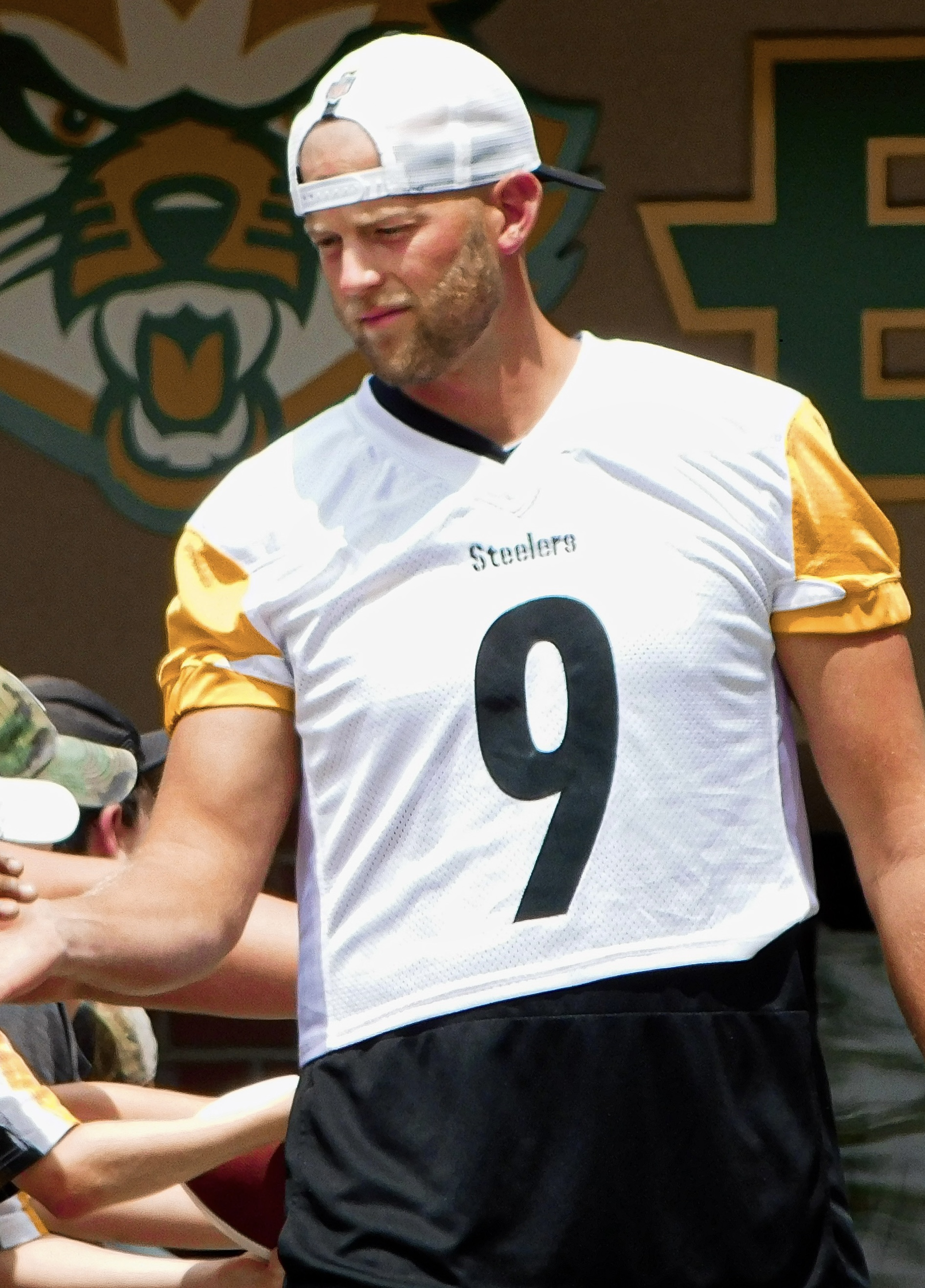
- Boswell with the Pittsburgh Steelers in 2025

No. 9 – Pittsburgh Steelers
- Position: Placekicker
- Roster status: Active

Personal information
- Born: March 16, 1991 (age 35); Fort Worth, Texas, U.S.
- Listed height: 6 ft 2 in (1.88 m)
- Listed weight: 185 lb (84 kg)

Career information
- High school: Fossil Ridge (Fort Worth)
- College: Rice (2009–2013)
- NFL draft: 2014: undrafted

Career history
- Houston Texans (2014)*; New York Giants (2015)*; Pittsburgh Steelers (2015–present)
- * Offseason or practice squad member only

Awards and highlights
- First-team All-Pro (2024); 2× Pro Bowl (2017, 2024); NFL scoring leader (2024); 2× Second-team All-C-USA (2012, 2013); NFL records: Most field goals made in a postseason game: 6; Most career games with 6+ field goals made: 3

Career NFL statistics as of Week 10, 2026
- Field goals made: 318
- Field goals attempted: 365
- Field goal %: 87.1%
- Extra points made: 370
- Extra points attempted: 386
- Extra point %: 95.9%
- Points: 1,324
- Longest field goal: 60
- Touchbacks: 425
- Stats at Pro Football Reference

Christopher Lynn Boswell (born March 16, 1991) is an American professional football placekicker for the Pittsburgh Steelers of the National Football League (NFL). He played college football for the Rice Owls and was signed by the Houston Texans in 2014 as an undrafted free agent. After spending time with the New York Giants, he joined the Steelers in 2015 and has remained with the team ever since.

Boswell is a two-time Pro Bowl selection, was a first-team All-Pro and the NFL scoring leader in 2024, and is currently the most accurate field goal kicker in NFL history on field goal attempts of 50 yards or more. He holds the NFL record for most field goals in a postseason game (6) and for most career games with six or more field goals made (3).

== Early life ==
Boswell attended and played high school football at Fossil Ridge High School. He received numerous Power 5 offers before committing to play college football at Rice. His father had lived in Brazil, playing street soccer.

== College career ==
Boswell played college football at Rice. With 358 career points, he is second on the all-time Rice scoring list behind ex-NFL wide receiver Jarett Dillard. In the 2012 season, Boswell led Conference USA in the field goals attempted and tied for first in field goals made.

Boswell declared for the 2014 NFL draft in April 2014.

== Professional career ==
Pre-draft measurables
| Height | Weight | Arm length | Hand span | Wingspan |
|---|---|---|---|---|
| 6 ft 2 1/4 in (1.89 m) | 185 lb (84 kg) | 31 1/4 in (0.79 m) | 8 5/8 in (0.22 m) | 6 ft 4 1/4 in (1.94 m) |
All values from NFL Combine

=== Houston Texans ===
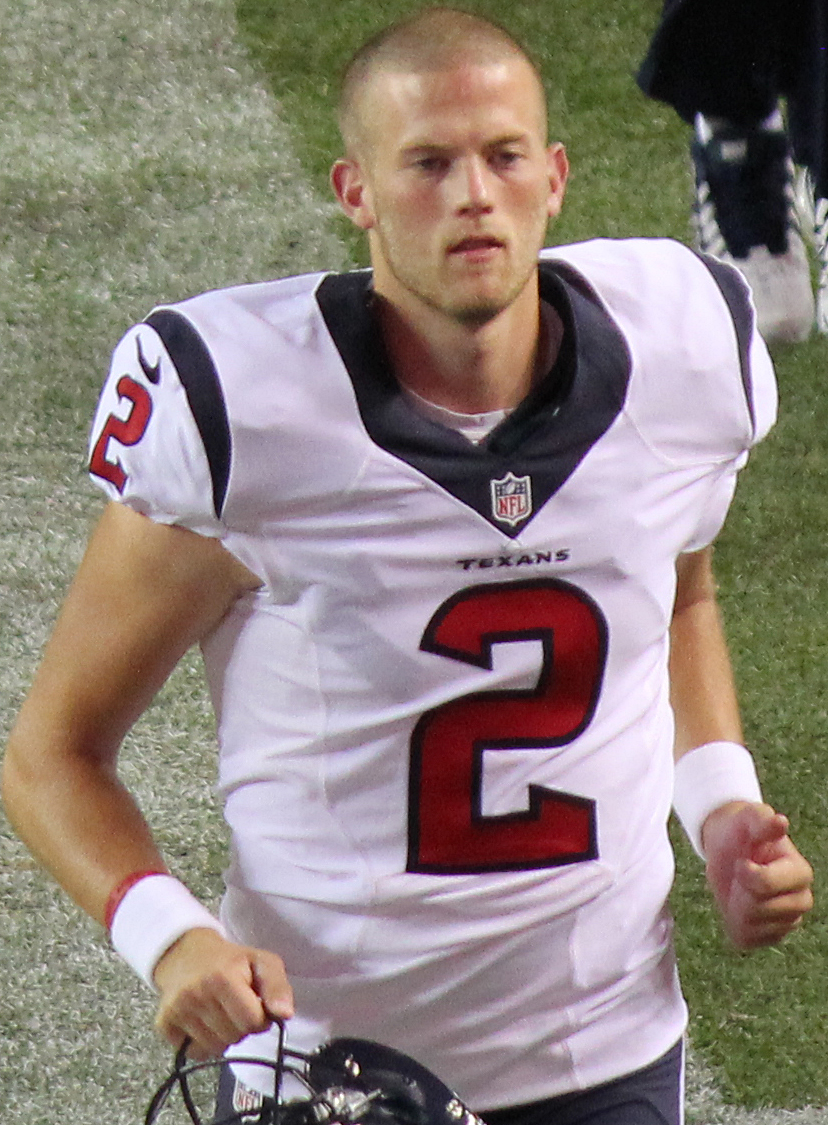
Boswell in 2014

Boswell went undrafted before signing with the Houston Texans on May 10, to compete with Randy Bullock. After participating in all four preseason games in which he missed multiple extra point attempts, Boswell was cut on August 29. He was re-signed to the practice squad on September 23, where he remained for the entirety of the 2014 season.

=== New York Giants ===
On January 7, 2015, Boswell signed a reserve/future contract with the New York Giants. On August 16, Boswell was waived by the Giants, but was re-signed on September 2. Three days later, Boswell was waived after failing to make the final 53-man roster.

=== Pittsburgh Steelers ===
==== 2015 ====
Boswell signed with the Pittsburgh Steelers on October 3, 2015, becoming their fourth placekicker in 2015.

Boswell made his NFL debut on October 12, completing all three of his extra points and making a 47-yard field goal attempt in a victory over the San Diego Chargers. He connected on the longest debut conversion in team history, besting Todd Peterson’s record of 46. He became the first player out of Rice to convert an extra point and field goal in a game since James Hamrick in Week 6 of the 1987 season. On October 18, the following week against the Arizona Cardinals, Boswell was 4-for-4 on field goals including kicks of 48, 49, and 51 yards, earning him AFC Special Teams Player of the Week honors. He is the first Steeler in team history to make three 47+ yard field goals in one game. On November 8, Boswell kicked three field goals, including the game-winner and three PATs against the Oakland Raiders, albeit missing his first field goal season-to-date. On November 15, Boswell kicked three field goals against the Cleveland Browns. His 14 field goals is tied for fourth among rookie/first-year players in team history, just behind Jeff Reed (2002, 17). On November 29, Boswell kicked three field goals against the Seattle Seahawks. On October 25, Boswell kicked two field goals against the Kansas City Chiefs. On December 6, Boswell kicked three field goals against the Indianapolis Colts. On December 13, Boswell kicked four field goals against the Cincinnati Bengals. On December 20, Boswell kicked two field goals against the Broncos. He was named AFC Special Teams Player of the Month for December. He tied a franchise record for the most consecutive games played while scoring at least 10 points, tied with Gary Anderson (1985). He also passed Kris Brown for the most made field goals by a rookie or first-year player in the history of the franchise with 29. He also set Steelers’ records for rookie/first-year kickers for points in a season with 113 and field goal percentage at 90.6. He finished the 2015 season with 26 of 27 extra points converted and 29 of 32 field goals converted. On January 7, 2016, Boswell won the AFC Special Teams Player of the Month for the month of December.

On January 9, 2016, Boswell kicked four field goals in an 18–16 win in the AFC Wild Card Round game against the Bengals. He successfully kicked a 35-yard game-winning field goal with less than 20 seconds remaining in the game. He set an NFL record for the most field goals by a rookie/first-year player in a playoff game. His four field goals also tied for the most in Steelers playoff history (Gary Anderson in the 1989 Wild Card Round). He also became the youngest kicker to make four field goals in a postseason game. On January 17, 2016, in a loss against the Broncos during the Divisional Round of the playoffs, Boswell tied a franchise record with seven total field goals completed in the post-season.

==== 2016 ====
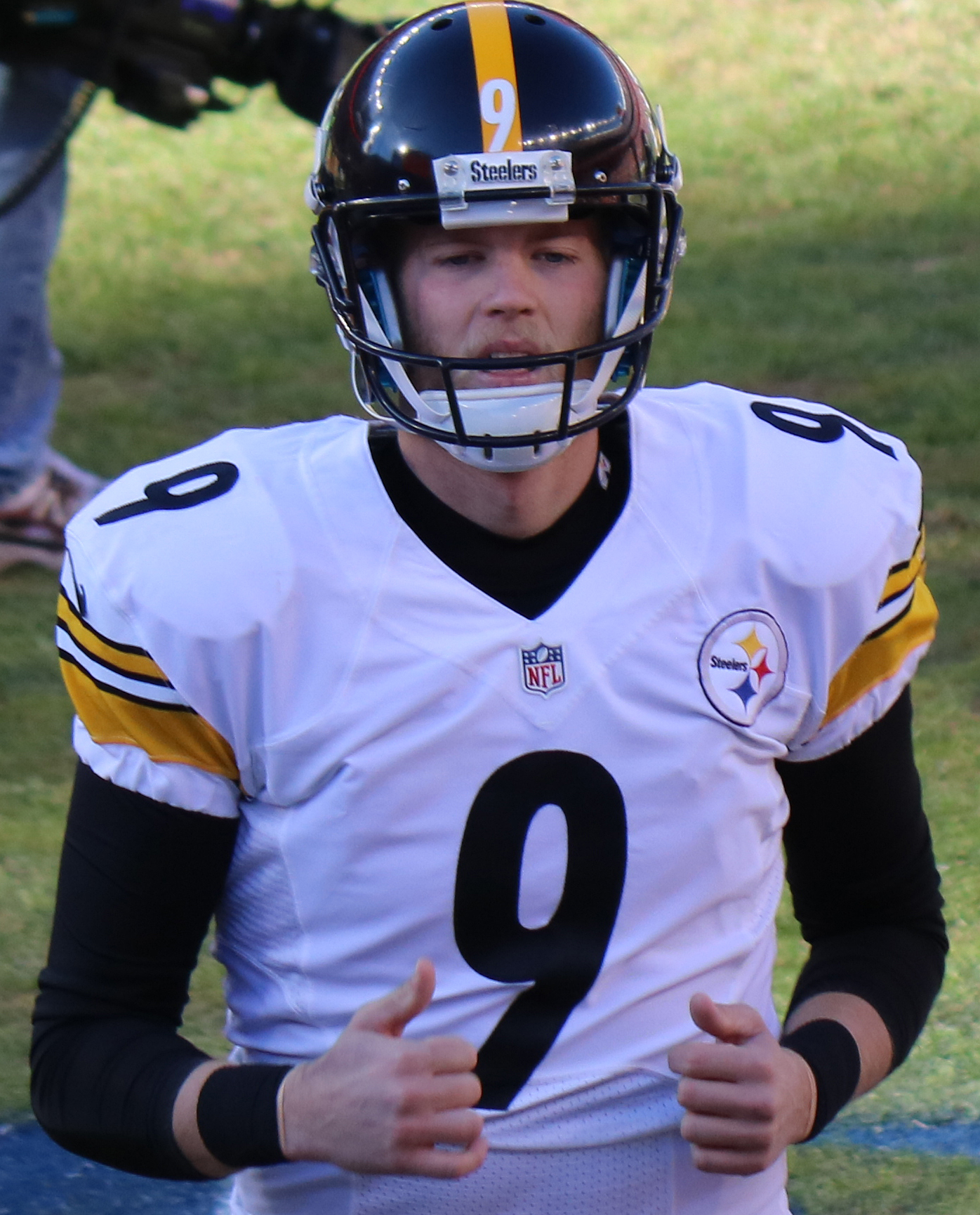
Boswell in 2016

On September 18, Boswell kicked a season-long 49-yard field goal against the Bengals. On October 23, Boswell kicked three field goals but missed two against the New England Patriots. On November 20, Boswell kicked three field goals against the Browns. On December 11, Boswell kicked two field goals against the Buffalo Bills. On December 18, Boswell kicked a career-high six field goals against the Cincinnati Bengals. He is the first kicker in NFL history to convert at least six field goals in a game and have five of those connect from 40+ yards. The last kicker to kick five field goals from 40+ yards in the same game was Mason Crosby in 2015. He is the third Pittsburgh Steeler in franchise history to accomplish the feat. (Jeff Reed in 2002 and Gary Anderson twice in 1988). He finished the 2016 season converting all 36 extra point attempts and 21 of 25 field goal attempts.

In the Divisional Round of the playoffs, he set a playoff record, kicking six field goals leading the team to narrowly beat the Chiefs 18–16, scoring all of the Steelers' points. Boswell's four first-half field goals also tied the team record for an entire playoff game.

==== 2017 ====
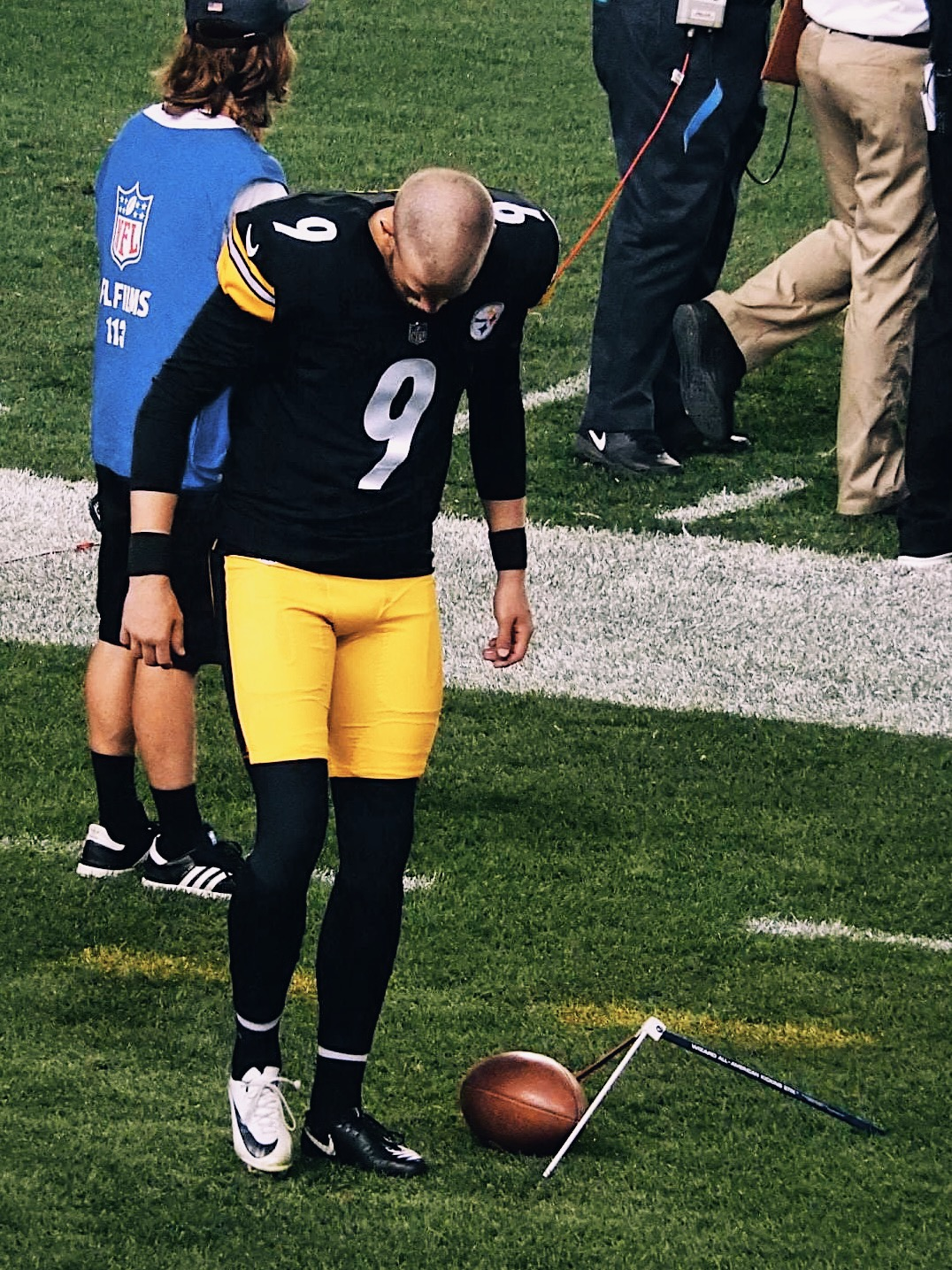
Boswell in 2017

On February 2, 2017, the Steelers signed Boswell to a one-year, exclusive-rights contract.

During a Week 2 26–9 victory over the Minnesota Vikings, Boswell converted four field goals and two extra points. During a Week 7 29–14 victory over the Bengals, he kicked a season-high five field goals. During Week 11, he kicked four field goals in a 40–17 victory over the Tennessee Titans. Boswell made a game-winning 53-yard field goal in the next game to beat the Green Bay Packers 31–28 as time expired. His game-winner set a new career-long and tied kicker Dan Bailey's record set in 2016 for the longest NFL field goal ever kicked at Heinz Field (53 yards) in its 17-year history. The only longer successful attempt was in collegiate play when former Old Dominion kicker Jarod Brown made a 54-yard kick against the Pitt Panthers in 2013. The following week, Boswell converted both extra points and all three field goal attempts, including a 38-yard game-winner as time expired, in a 23–20 comeback win over the Bengals, earning him AFC Special Teams Player of the Week honors. During a narrow Week 14 39–38 victory over the Baltimore Ravens, he kicked four field goals, including a game-winner. Throughout the season, Boswell has kicked multiple game-winning field goals in the last minutes, earning him status as one of the Steelers' "Killer B's" and a spot on the AFC's Pro Bowl starting roster. In the 2017 season, Boswell converted 37 of 39 extra point attempts and 35 of 38 field goal attempts. He finished the season tied with Harrison Butker for fourth in scoring with 142 points.

==== 2018 ====
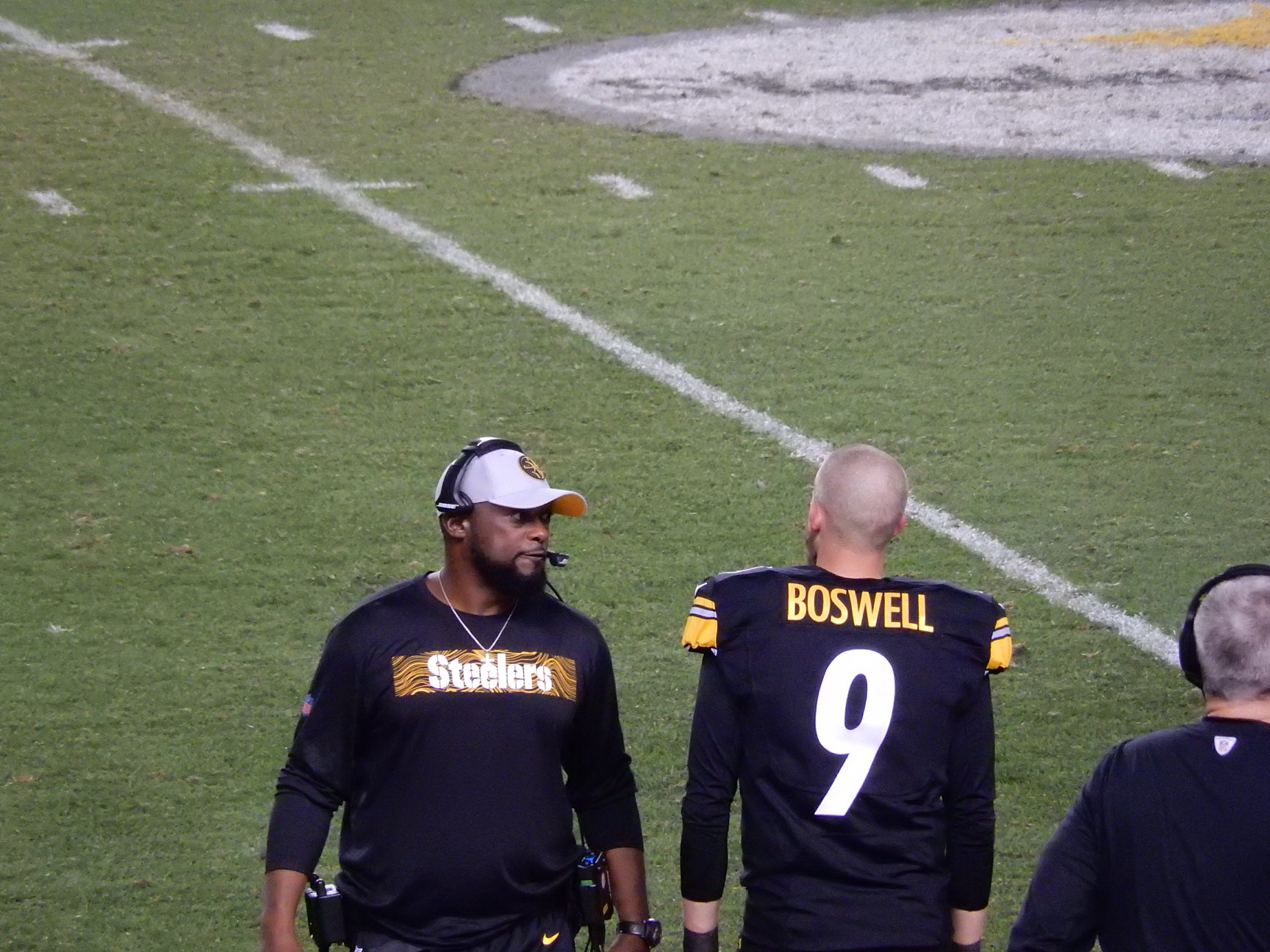
Mike Tomlin and Boswell in 2018

On March 12, 2018, the Steelers placed a second-round restricted free-agent tender on Boswell. On April 5, he signed the tender. On August 23, 2018, the Steelers signed Boswell to a new five-year deal, keeping him under contract through the 2022 season. He was later named a captain alongside Ben Roethlisberger, Maurkice Pouncey, and Cameron Heyward.

During a Week 12 24–17 road loss to the Broncos, Boswell scored his first NFL touchdown on a fake field goal in the waning moments of the second quarter, tossing a two-yard pass to offensive tackle Alejandro Villanueva as time expired. He would then convert the ensuing extra point, thus accounting for all seven points of the score.

Boswell was placed on injured reserve on December 28, 2018. It was revealed that he suffered a grade-2 tear in his groin as reported by his brother, Stephen Boswell. Boswell was replaced by kicker Matt McCrane for the Steelers' final game against the Cincinnati Bengals for the 2018 season. Boswell had a down year in 2018, converting only 13 of 20 field goal attempts and 43 of 48 extra point attempts. His 65% field goal percentage was ranked last among kickers with at least 20 field goal attempts.

==== 2019 ====
Boswell rebounded in 2019, going 29 for 31 (93.5%) on field goal attempts and a perfect 28 for 28 on extra point attempts.

==== 2020 ====
On November 8, 2020, in a game at AT&T Stadium against the Dallas Cowboys, Boswell made a then career-long 59-yard field goal, which was also the Steelers franchise record for the longest field goal. He finished the 2020 season converting 34 of 38 extra point attempts and 19 of 20 field goal attempts in 13 games.

==== 2021 ====
During Week 2 against the Las Vegas Raiders, Boswell broke the Heinz Field field goal record with a 56-yard field goal. During Week 6, he hit three field goals against the Seahawks, including a 37-yard game-winning field goal in overtime. Two weeks later against the Browns, Boswell was concussed on a fake field goal attempt. The ball was snapped to him, he rolled out right while attempting to pass, and was hit immediately after throwing the ball, which landed incomplete. In the next game against the Chicago Bears, Boswell missed an extra point in the third quarter, but was 3 for 3 on field goals, hitting a 54-yarder, a 52-yarder, and a game-winning 40-yarder. He finished the 2021 season converting 27 of 29 extra point attempts and 36 of 40 field goal attempts in 17 games.

==== 2022 ====
On August 1, 2022, Boswell signed a four-year, $20 million contract extension with the Steelers.

During the season-opener at the Bengals, Boswell missed a 55-yard field goal that would have won the game in overtime which hit the left upright. However, he would go on to kick a 53-yard game-winning field goal, converting on three of four field goal attempts in that game. Three weeks later, Boswell made a 59-yard field goal against the New York Jets as time expired in the second quarter, making it the longest field goal scored at Acrisure Stadium to date, while also tying his then career long. On November 10, 2022, he was placed on injured reserve with a groin injury. Boswell was activated on December 10. He appeared in 12 games in the 2022 season and converted all 18 extra point attempts and 20 of 28 field goal attempts.

==== 2023 ====
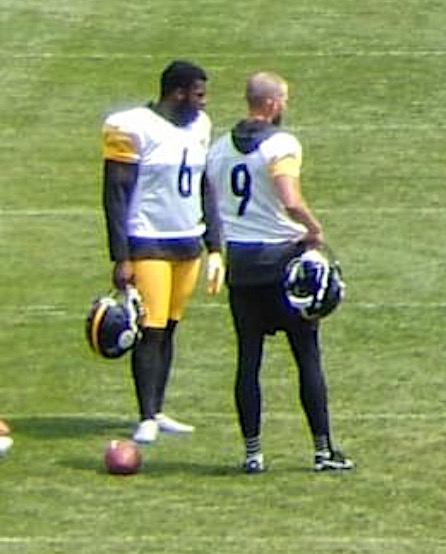
Boswell (right) with punter Pressley Harvin in 2023

In the 2023 season, Boswell appeared in all 17 regular-season games. He finished converting 27 of 28 extra point attempts and 29 of 31 field goal attempts. Boswell made another postseason start when the Steelers traveled to Highmark Stadium to play against the Buffalo Bills. During the game, Boswell successfully kicked two extra point attempts and made a 40-yard field goal as the Steelers ended their season losing 17-31.

==== 2024 ====
On September 8, 2024, Boswell converted all six of his field goal attempts for the second time in his career. He also became the first player in Steelers franchise history to make at least three field goals from over 50 yards away with field goals made at 57, 51, and 56 yards in an 18–10 win over the Atlanta Falcons. His performance earned him the AFC Special Teams Player of the Week. After an impressive start to the 2024 season, Boswell was named AFC Special Teams Player of the Month for September. He was named the AFC Special Teams Player of the Month for October after converting 12 field goals.

On November 17, 2024, Boswell converted all six of his field goals for the third time in his career in a narrow 18–16 victory over the Baltimore Ravens, becoming the first kicker in NFL history with six-plus made field goals in three career games. He became the first player in NFL history to have two separate games converting at least six field goals in the same season.

During the Steelers’ matchup against the Eagles, Boswell broke the team’s franchise record for most field goals in a single season. He recorded a 37-yard field goal to break the record, which Boswell set in 2021. Boswell was named to his second Pro Bowl on January 2, 2025. He finished the 2024 season converting all 35 extra point attempts and 41 of 44 field goal attempts, making him the NFL's top scorer for the season. He was the first player in franchise history to lead the NFL in scoring. Boswell was named first-team All-Pro, the first All-Pro honor of his career.

==== 2025 ====
During the narrow season-opening 34–32 victory over the New York Jets, Boswell scored a record 60-yard game winning field goal, which broke the Steelers' franchise record for longest field goal (which he had previously set in 2020). Boswell was named AFC Special Teams Player of the Week. Boswell finished the 2025 season converting 42 of 43 extra point attempts and 27 of 32 field goal attempts.

==== 2026 ====
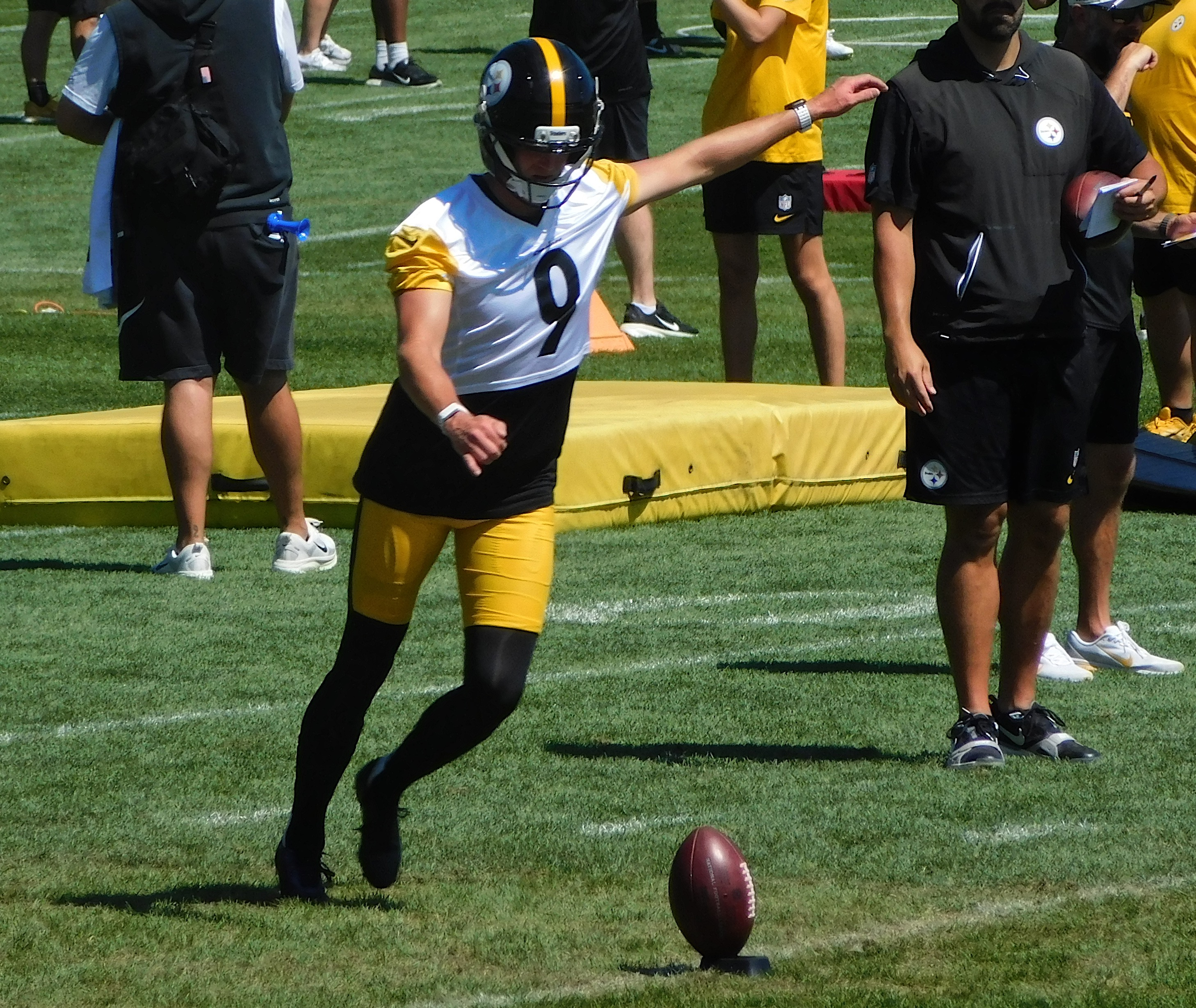
Boswell during training camp in 2026

On May 11, 2026, Boswell signed a four-year, $28 million contract extension with the Steelers which tied him with Brandon Aubrey as the highest paid kicker in NFL history.

== Personal life ==
In June 2024, he married his wife, Havana Fox. They have children born March 2025 and September 2026.

== Career statistics ==
Legend
| | NFL record |
| | Led the league |
| **Bold** | Career high |

=== NFL ===
==== Regular season ====
| General | | | Field goals | | | | | PATs | | | Kickoffs | | | Points |
| Season | Team | GP | FGM | FGA | FG% | Blck | Long | XPM | XPA | XP% | KO | Avg | TBs | Pts |
|---|---|---|---|---|---|---|---|---|---|---|---|---|---|---|
| 2015 | PIT | 12 | 29 | 32 | 90.6% | 0 | 51 | 26 | 27 | 96.3% | 74 | 63.2 | 26 | 113 |
| 2016 | PIT | 15 | 21 | 25 | 84.0% | **1** | 49 | 36 | 36 | **100.0%** | 80 | 61.9 | 49 | 99 |
| 2017 | PIT | 16 | 35 | 38 | 92.1% | **1** | 53 | 37 | 39 | 94.9% | **90** | 63.1 | 46 | 142 |
| 2018 | PIT | 15 | 13 | 20 | 65.0% | 0 | 50 | **43** | **48** | 89.6% | 81 | 62.9 | 50 | 82 |
| 2019 | PIT | 16 | 29 | 31 | 93.5% | 0 | 51 | 28 | 28 | **100.0%** | 72 | 63.2 | 31 | 115 |
| 2020 | PIT | 13 | 19 | 20 | **95.0%** | 0 | 59 | 34 | 38 | 89.5% | 73 | 63.3 | 44 | 91 |
| 2021 | PIT | 17 | 36 | 40 | 90.0% | 0 | 56 | 27 | 29 | 93.1% | 86 | 63.5 | 40 | 135 |
| 2022 | PIT | 12 | 20 | 28 | 71.4% | **1** | 59 | 18 | 18 | **100.0%** | 50 | 61.5 | 21 | 78 |
| 2023 | PIT | 17 | 29 | 31 | 93.5% | 0 | 57 | 27 | 28 | 96.4% | 76 | **63.6** | **55** | 114 |
| 2024 | PIT | 17 | **41** | **44** | 93.2% | **1** | 57 | 35 | 35 | **100.0%** | **90** | 63.5 | 49 | **158** |
| 2025 | PIT | 17 | 27 | 32 | 84.4% | 0 | **60** | 42 | 43 | 97.7% | 88 | 59.2 | 7 | 123 |
| 2026 | PIT | 9 | 19 | 24 | 79.2% | 0 | 58 | 17 | 17 | **100.0%** | 45 | 60.0 | 7 | 74 |
| Career | | 176 | 318 | 365 | 87.1% | 4 | 60 | 370 | 386 | 95.9% | 905 | 63.0 | 425 | 1,324 |

==== Postseason ====
| General | | | Field goals | | | | | PATs | | | Kickoffs | | | Points |
| Season | Team | GP | FGM | FGA | FG% | Blck | Long | XPM | XPA | XP% | KO | Avg | TBs | Pts |
|---|---|---|---|---|---|---|---|---|---|---|---|---|---|---|
| 2015 | PIT | 2 | 7 | 7 | **100.0%** | 0 | 47 | 1 | 1 | **100.0%** | 11 | 62.2 | **8** | 22 |
| 2016 | PIT | 3 | **8** | **8** | **100.0%** | 0 | 45 | 3 | 5 | 60.0% | **17** | 59.2 | 6 | **27** |
| 2017 | PIT | 1 | – | – | – | – | – | **6** | **6** | **100.0%** | 7 | 52.4 | 3 | 6 |
| 2020 | PIT | 1 | 1 | 1 | **100.0%** | 0 | **49** | 2 | 2 | **100.0%** | 6 | 54.2 | 2 | 5 |
| 2021 | PIT | 1 | – | – | – | – | – | 3 | 3 | **100.0%** | 4 | 51.0 | 1 | 3 |
| 2023 | PIT | 1 | 1 | 1 | **100.0%** | 0 | 40 | 2 | 2 | **100.0%** | 4 | **66.0** | 3 | 5 |
| 2024 | PIT | 1 | – | – | – | – | – | 2 | 2 | **100.0%** | 3 | 65.0 | 3 | 2 |
| 2025 | PIT | 1 | 2 | 2 | **100.0%** | 0 | 35 | — | — | — | 3 | 61.0 | 0 | 6 |
| Career | | 11 | 19 | 19 | 100.0% | 0 | 49 | 19 | 21 | 90.5% | 55 | 58.7 | 26 | 76 |

=== College ===
| Year | Team | GP | Overall FGs | | | | PATs | | | Total points |
| Year | Team | GP | Lng | FGA | FGM | Pct | XPA | XPM | Pct | Total points |
|---|---|---|---|---|---|---|---|---|---|---|
| 2009 | Rice | 0 | DNP | | | | | | | |
| 2010 | Rice | 12 | 50 | 17 | 11 | 64.7 | 44 | 41 | 93.2 | 74 |
| 2011 | Rice | 12 | 54 | 21 | 17 | **81.0** | 32 | 31 | **96.9** | 82 |
| 2012 | Rice | 13 | **57** | **29** | **23** | 79.3 | 47 | 45 | 95.7 | **114** |
| 2013 | Rice | 14 | 56 | 21 | 14 | 66.7 | **49** | **47** | 95.9 | 89 |
| Career | | 51 | 57 | 88 | 65 | 73.9 | 172 | 164 | 95.3 | 359 |

== See also ==
- List of NFL annual scoring leaders
- Most accurate kickers in NFL history
