= List of most accurate kickers in NFL history =

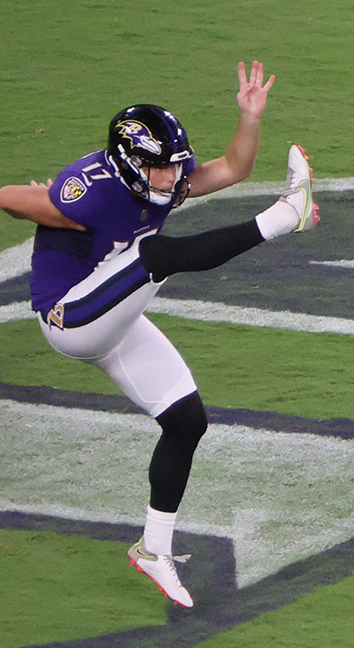
Cameron Dicker playing for the Baltimore Ravens in 2022

This article contains a full list of the 20 most accurate kickers in NFL history with at least 100 field goal attempts. Cameron Dicker has the most accurate field goal percentage (FG%) in the National Football League, hitting successful field goals 92.6% of the time during official games. Current stats are updated from Pro Football Reference (PFR) NFL field goal % career leaders.

On September 15, 2025, Dicker kicked his 100th career field goal attempt (successfully scoring his 94th career field goal) against the Las Vegas Raiders, officially making him the most accurate kicker in NFL history.

== Evolution in accuracy ==
Field goal accuracy in the NFL has steadily improved over time. At the beginning of the league's start in the 1920s, to the first Super Bowls in the 1960s, kickers' accuracy was between 40 and 55%. In the 1970s and 1980s, leading kickers typically converted around 70–75% of attempts. By the late 1990s through the 2000s, kickers' accuracy increased to around 80–85%. From the 2010s to 2020s, many of the league's most accurate kickers regularly hit the high 80% with some exceeding 90%.

Kicking accuracy by field goal distance from 1999 to 2025
	20–25 yds	25–30 yds	30–35 yds	35–40 yds	40–45 yds	45–50 yds	50–55 yds	55–60 yds	60+ yds
1999–2003	97%	93%	85%	80%	71%	60%	56%	24%	0%
2004–2008	99%	93%	88%	85%	77%	68%	57%	41%	13%
2009–2013	97%	96%	91%	85%	79%	75%	64%	47%	26%
2014–2018	99%	96%	94%	89%	84%	73%	67%	58%	23%
2019–2023	99%	97%	95%	91%	82%	74%	71%	57%	36%
2024–2025	99%	95%	97%	90%	81%	69%	76%	64%	27%

A 2015 article in FiveThirtyEight entitled "Kickers are Forever" found that kicker accuracy has increased over time, and there is a nearly perfect correlation between year and accuracy.

== List ==
Currently Playing
Retired
Free Agent

Rank	Name	FG%	Teams
1	Cameron Dicker	93.0%	Philadelphia Eagles (2022); Los Angeles Chargers (2022–present)
2	Justin Tucker	89.1%	Baltimore Ravens (2012–2024); Kansas City Chiefs (2026–present)
3	Eddy Piñeiro	88.6%	Oakland Raiders (2018); Chicago Bears (2019–2020); New York Jets (2021); Carolina Panthers (2022–2024); San Francisco 49ers (2025–present)
4	Kaʻimi Fairbairn	88.1%	Houston Texans (2016–present)
5	Chris Boswell	87.1%	Pittsburgh Steelers (2015–present)
6	Josh Lambo	87.1%	San Diego Chargers (2015–2016); Jacksonville Jaguars (2017–2021); Tennessee Titans (2022)
7	Harrison Butker	86.8%	Carolina Panthers (2017); Kansas City Chiefs (2017–present)
8	Riley Patterson	86.8%	Detroit Lions (2021); Jacksonville Jaguars (2022); Detroit Lions (2023); Cleveland Browns (2023); New York Jets (2024); Cleveland Browns (2024); Atlanta Falcons (2024); Miami Dolphins (2025–2026); Baltimore Ravens (2026–present)
9	Brandon Aubrey	86.8%	Dallas Cowboys (2023–present)
10	Chase McLaughlin	86.5%	Los Angeles Chargers (2019); Indianapolis Colts (2019), (2022); San Francisco 49ers (2019); Jacksonville Jaguars (2020); New York Jets (2020); Cleveland Browns(2021); Tampa Bay Buccaneers (2023–present)
11	Mike Vanderjagt	86.5%	Indianapolis Colts (1998–2005); Dallas Cowboys (2006)
12	Robbie Gould	86.5%	Chicago Bears (2005–2015); New York Giants (2016); San Francisco 49ers (2017–2022)
13	Kai Forbath	86.4%	Washington Redskins (2012–2015); New Orleans Saints (2015); Minnesota Vikings (2016–2017); Jacksonville Jaguars (2018); New England Patriots (2019); Dallas Cowboys (2019); Los Angeles Rams (2020)
14	Stephen Gostkowski	86.3%	New England Patriots (2006–2019); Tennessee Titans (2020)
15	Tyler Bass	86.3%	Buffalo Bills (2020-present)
16	Nate Kaeding	86.2%	San Diego Chargers (2004–2012); Miami Dolphins (2012)
17	Wil Lutz	86.0%	New Orleans Saints (2016–2022); Denver Broncos (2023–present)
18	Daniel Carlson	86.0%	Minnesota Vikings (2018); Oakland / Las Vegas Raiders (2018–2025); New Orleans Saints (2026)
19	Dan Bailey	85.9%	Dallas Cowboys (2011–2017); Minnesota Vikings (2018–2020)
20	Rob Bironas	85.7%	Tennessee Titans (2005–2013)

== See also ==
- Field goal
- Placekicker
- List of longest NFL field goals
