= Cameron Dicker =

American football player (born 2000)

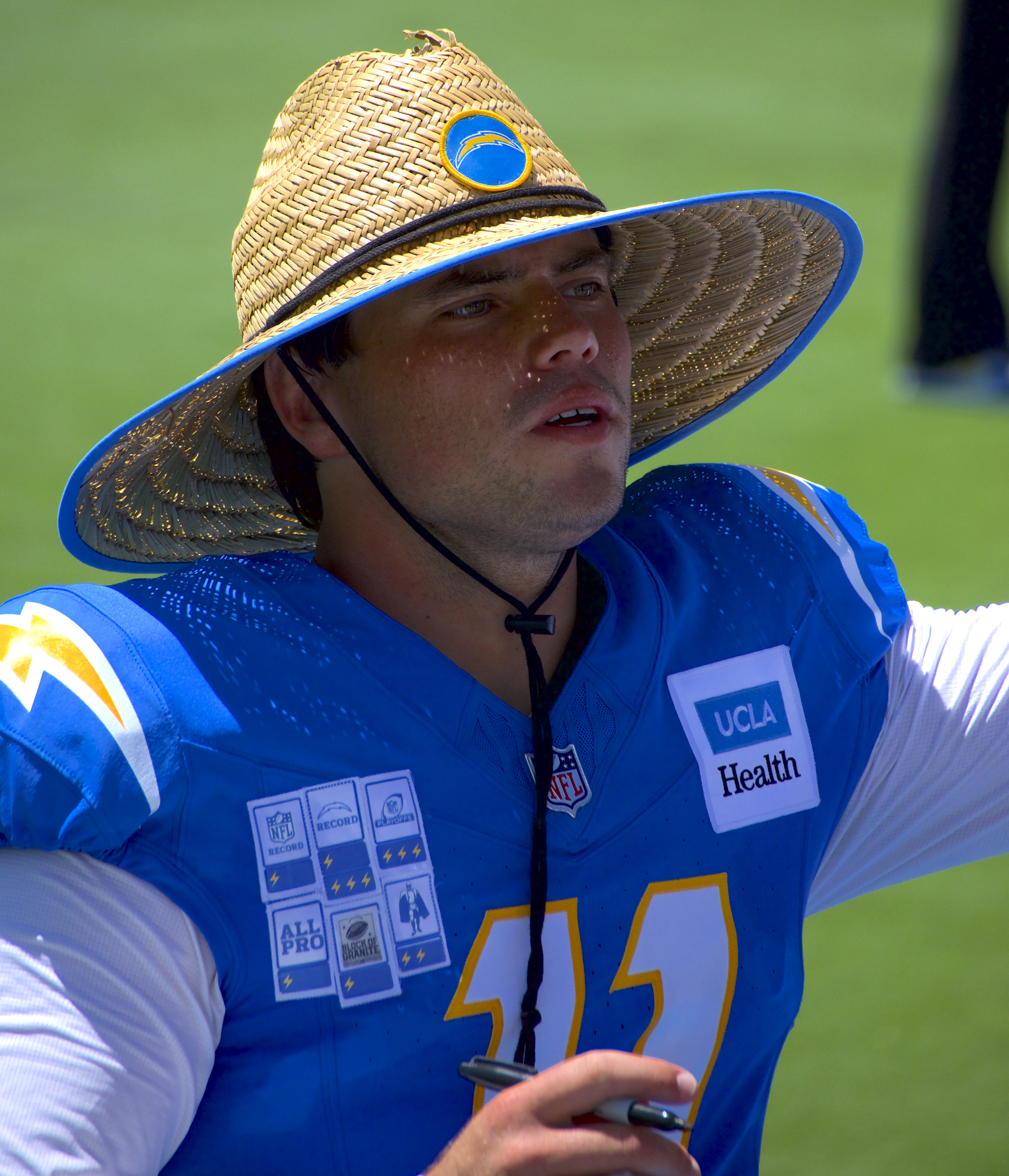
- Dicker with the Los Angeles Chargers in 2026

No. 11 – Los Angeles Chargers
- Position: Placekicker
- Roster status: Active

Personal information
- Born: May 6, 2000 (age 26); Hong Kong
- Listed height: 6 ft 1 in (1.85 m)
- Listed weight: 216 lb (98 kg)

Career information
- High school: Lake Travis (Austin, Texas, U.S.)
- College: Texas (2018–2021)
- NFL draft: 2022: undrafted

Career history
- Los Angeles Rams (2022)*; Baltimore Ravens (2022)*; Philadelphia Eagles (2022); Los Angeles Chargers (2022–present)
- * Offseason or practice squad member only

Awards and highlights
- Pro Bowl (2025); PFWA All-Rookie Team (2022); First-team All-Big 12 (2021); 2× Second-team All-Big 12 (2018, 2020); NFL records: Highest career field goal % in NFL history (minimum 100 field goal attempts): 93%; Longest NFL fair catch kick: 57 yards

Career NFL statistics as of Week 10, 2026
- Field goals made: 147
- Field goals attempted: 158
- Field goal %: 93.0%
- Extra points made: 138
- Extra points attempted: 142
- Extra point %: 97.2%
- Points: 579
- Longest field goal: 59
- Touchbacks: 202
- Stats at Pro Football Reference

Cameron Lawrence Dicker (born May 6, 2000), nicknamed "Dicker the Kicker," is an American professional football placekicker for the Los Angeles Chargers of the National Football League (NFL). He was an All-Big 12 kicker and punter for the Texas Longhorns, where he holds the school record for field goals made, in college football. Dicker was signed by the Los Angeles Rams as an undrafted free agent in 2022. He has also been a member of the Baltimore Ravens and Philadelphia Eagles. Dicker is the most accurate kicker in NFL history by field goal percentage (93%), and is the only NFL player born in Hong Kong.

== Early life ==
Cameron Lawrence Dicker was born on May 6, 2000, in Hong Kong, to Kelly and Rachel Dicker. He has a sister named Annabelle. His parents were from Seattle but were working in China. Dicker spent the first 11 years of his life in Shanghai, where his father worked. Dicker grew up watching soccer and is a fan of Liverpool F.C. In 2011, when he was 11, his family moved to Austin, Texas.

Dicker did not play football until the fifth grade as part of an ex-pat youth league in Shanghai. He moved to Austin and played on the middle school team, as a left guard.

During his high school career at Austin's Lake Travis High School, Dicker was a two-time all-state selection and was the starting kicker for three seasons and the starting punter for two seasons, winning the Texas 6A Division I State Championship in 2016 with teammates Garrett Wilson and Charlie Brewer and was state runner-up in 2015. Dicker had 331 points, going 34-of-43 on field goal attempts and 229-of-232 on extra point attempts. He also set a Lake Travis High School record with a 53-yard field goal. Dicker was ranked the number four kicker in the nation by 247Sports and the number 16 kicker nationally by ESPN in the 2018 class. On May 4, 2017, Dicker committed to Texas.

Dicker also played soccer at Lake Travis, helping them to the 2015 State Championship game.

== College career ==
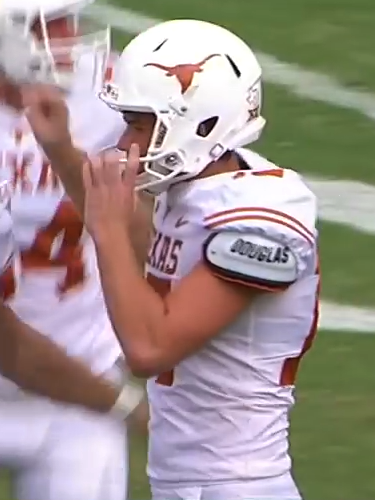
Dicker in 2018

Dicker played college football at the University of Texas where he earned immediate playing time, winning the starting role as a freshman. Dicker kicked his first career game-winning field goal against #7 Oklahoma. In that game, he gained notoriety as "Dicker the Kicker" (by play-by-play announcer Gus Johnson of Fox Sports) when he kicked the game-winning 40-yard field goal in the Red River Showdown. For that kick, Dicker was named the Big 12 Special Teams player of the week for the first time. He was named Big 12 Special Teams player of the week against after the Texas Tech game when he was perfect for kicking, hitting field goals of 46 and 52 yards. The 52 yard field goal Dicker hit was tied for the third longest by a freshman in school history. He went 18-of-25 on field goals and 51-of-52 on extra points that year, earning 2018 second-team All-Big 12 honors, honorable mention as Big 12 Special Teams Player of the Year and All-Rookie Academic All-Big 12 honors. Dicker's field goals kicked and attempted both led the Big 12 that year, and it was the most field goals kicked by a freshman in Texas history. His 97 points scored was the 2nd most by a freshman in school history. That season, Dicker helped the Longhorns make it to the 2018 Big 12 Championship game, to upset Georgia in the 2019 Sugar Bowl and finish ranked #9.

Before the 2019 season started, Dicker was placed on the Lou Groza Award watchlist. That season, he kicked a college career long 57 yard field goal against Rice, the sixth longest in Big 12 history and seventh longest in school history at the time. The only Longhorn to kick a longer field goal is Russell Erxleben. A few weeks later against Kansas, Dicker made all six of his extra point attempts and both of his field goal attempts, including kicking a walk-off 33-yard game winner and earned Big 12 Special Teams player of the week honors. He helped the Longhorns to a win in the 2019 Alamo Bowl and a #25 finish in the rankings. Dicker was also an Honorable Mention as a kicker on the All-Big 12 team, led the conference in extra point attempts and makes and earned First Team Academic All-Big 12 honors. He was perfect for extra points on the season, tying the school's extra point percentage record for a season.

Dicker earned second-team All-Big 12 honors in 2020 as he again led the conference in extra point attempts and makes. When Ryan Bujcevski suffered a torn ACL against West Virginia, Dicker also took over punting duties. He again helped the Longhorns to a bowl win, in the 2020 Alamo Bowl, and a top 25 ranking (#19/#20) in the polls. During the Alamo Bowl, Dicker set the record for the longest field goal in Alamo Bowl history, kicking a 53-yarder that was also the second longest field goal in a bowl game in school history. For the third year in a row, he was the team's scoring leader, and he again earned First Team Academic All-Big 12 honors.

In 2021, Dicker continued to punt as Bujcevski recovered from his injury. Before the season started, he was again placed on the Lou Groza Award watchlist. Against Texas Tech, Dicker kicked 10 extra points, tied for the fifth most in a game in Big 12 history and tied for first in school history for both extra points attempted and made in a game. He was named the Big 12 co-Special Teams player of the week after the Kansas game when he made all eight of his extra points and had two punts for 90 yards. In the next game, Dicker had four field goals against TCU, which tied for fifth for the most field goals in a single game in school history. The following week, he had a career-long 78 yard punt, the fifth longest in school history. Against Oklahoma State a week later, Dicker averaged 51.7 ypp, the seventh best single-game punting average in school history, on seven punts including the school's sixth longest punt ever of 77 yards. In November, he was named a Ray Guy Award semifinalist for his punting as he led the nation in et punting average. At the end of the season, Dicker was named 1st Team All-Big 12 as a punter after averaging 46.8 ypp (third best season in school history behind Michael Dickson in 2016 and 2017), was honorable mention as Big 12 Special Teams Player of the Year, honorable mention as a kicker, made the First Team Academic All-Big 12 team for the fourth consecutive year and was a Campbell Trophy Award semifinalist. Across the 2020 season, he made 70 extra point attempts in a row and 12 field goals in a row - both were the fourth longest such streaks in school history at the time. Dicker also connected on a career high 86.7% of field goal attempts - the fourth best for a season in school history.

Dicker finished his career as the highest scoring kicker in school history and third on the all-time scoring list with 386 points, behind Cedric Benson and Ricky Williams. In the final game of his career, Dicker broke Phil Dawson's school record for the most field goals made (60) in a career and tied him for most field goal attempts (79). He also finished second in extra point attempts (210), second for extra points made (206) and fourth in field goal accuracy (75.9%). Dicker's four career field goals of longer than 50 yards tied him for 6th in school history.

On January 19, 2022, Dicker declared for the 2022 NFL draft. On February 5, he participated in the 2022 Senior Bowl.

== Professional career ==
Pre-draft measurables
Height	Weight	Arm length	Hand span	Wingspan
6 ft 0 7/8 in (1.85 m)	220 lb (100 kg)	30 in (0.76 m)	9 in (0.23 m)	6 ft 1 3/8 in (1.86 m)
All values from NFL Combine

=== Los Angeles Rams ===
After going undrafted, Dicker signed with the Los Angeles Rams as an undrafted free agent on May 9, 2022. He was released by on August 16.

=== Baltimore Ravens ===
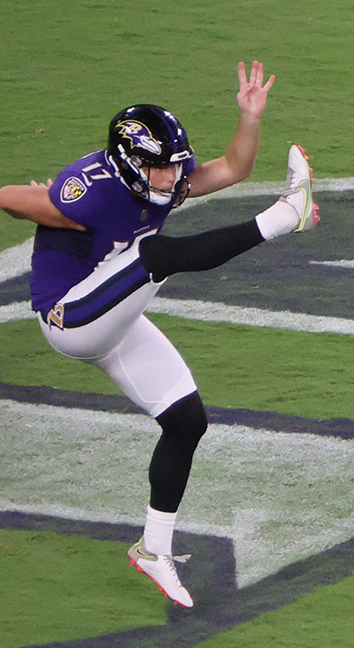
Dicker in 2022

On August 26, 2022, Dicker was signed by the Baltimore Ravens as a punter and kicker; however, he was waived two days later as part of final roster cuts.

=== Philadelphia Eagles ===
On October 4, 2022, Dicker was signed by the Philadelphia Eagles to their practice squad. Four days later, he was elevated to the active roster to fill in for the injured Jake Elliott.

During Week 5, Dicker kicked two extra points and two field goals in his NFL debut against the Arizona Cardinals, including a game-winning 23-yard kick in the final two minutes - making Dicker the only Eagle to ever kick a game-winning field goal in an NFL debut. For his performance, Dicker was named NFC Special Teams Player of the Week. He was moved back to the practice squad on October 11 after Elliott's return, and was released by the Eagles on October 29 to make room for Tarron Jackson.

=== Los Angeles Chargers ===
==== 2022 season ====
On November 3, 2022, Dicker was signed to the Los Angeles Chargers practice squad following an injury to kicker Taylor Bertolet who was filling in for an injured Dustin Hopkins. Dicker was elevated to the roster two days later. During Week 9, he made two field goals, including a game-winning 37-yard kick as time expired against the Atlanta Falcons. For his performance, Dicker won his second Special Teams Player of the Week award. He is the first rookie kicker to win the Special Teams Player of the Week Award for two different teams, let alone in two conferences.

After being elevated from the practice squad two more weeks, Dicker had reached the maximum number of times he could be called up. He was signed to the active roster on November 22 and Hopkins was put on injured reserve. On December 18, Dicker kicked a game-winning field goal against the Tennessee Titans to move the Chargers into a Wild Card position. He was later named the Special Teams Player of the Month for December.

Dicker appeared in 11 games as a rookie and converted all 24 extra point attempts and 21-of-22 field goal attempts, finishing with the highest field goal percentage in the league that season. He was named to the PFWA All-Rookie Team. During the Wild Card Round against the Jacksonville Jaguars, Dicker converted all three extra point attempts and three of four field goal attempts in the narrow 31–30 road loss.

==== 2023 season ====
Dicker was named the Chargers' kicker after Hopkins was traded to the Browns before the season. During Week 16, against the Buffalo Bills, Dicker made five field goals in the narrow 24–22 loss.

==== 2024 season ====
On August 30, 2024, Dicker signed a four-year, $22.04 million contract extension with the Chargers.

In December 2024, Dicker was nominated by the Chargers for the 2024 Walter Payton Man of the Year award. His work with various charities include a donation to the Chargers Impact Fund, participation in the Chargers' 'Boo at the Bolt' Halloween party, work with The Friendship Foundation (including providing 30 tickets to a Chargers home game), and a PSA for Easterseals Southern California.

On December 19, 2024, in a Thursday Night Football game against the Denver Broncos, Dicker kicked a 57-yard fair catch kick, the first successful attempt since 1976, and the longest successful fair catch kick in NFL history. The most recent player to achieve this was Ray Wersching, coincidentally also playing for the Chargers, then based in San Diego. Wersching was invited by team owner Dean Spanos to make a surprise appearance at a subsequent team practice; he remarked that he was "impressed" by Dicker's achievement, which set a new record. In Week 17, Dicker was four-for-four on field goals and four-for-four on extra points in a 40–7 win over the New England Patriots, earning AFC Special Teams Player of the Week. The following week he was four-for-five on field goals and made two extra points in a 34–20 win over the Raiders, earning player of the week honors again.

Dicker helped the Chargers to earn the #5 seed in the playoffs that year, but they lost in the Wild Card Round to the Texans.

==== 2025 season ====
In Week 2, on a Monday Night Football matchup against the Las Vegas Raiders, Dicker became the most accurate kicker in NFL history, replacing fellow University of Texas alum Justin Tucker by 5 percentage points. The next week, Dicker kicked three field goals, including a 43 yard game-winning field goal against the Denver Broncos to win 23–20. Three weeks later, Dicker kicked 5 field goals and the game–winning field goal against the Miami Dolphins to narrowly win 29–27.

In Week 8, Dicker missed his first field goal of the season against the Minnesota Vikings. He rebounded by making his last three field goals in the game as the Chargers won 37–10. Two weeks later on Sunday Night Football against the Pittsburgh Steelers, Dicker made a season long 59 yard field goal but missed a 55 yard field goal in the same game.

On December 5, Dicker was again nominated by the Chargers for the 2025 Walter Payton NFL Man of the Year Award. Two days later against his former team, the Eagles, he made all five field goal attempts including a 46 yarder to send it to overtime, and a go-ahead field goal from 54, which led to their 22–19 victory. In Week 15, Dicker kicked three field goals and one extra point in a 16-13 win over the Kansas City Chiefs, earning his second AFC Special Teams Player of the Week honors of the season. He was named to his first Pro Bowl. Two weeks later against the Houston Texans, Dicker missed a 32-yard field goal, the first miss of his career that was inside 40 yards, and later missed an extra point in the 20–16 loss.

The Chargers made the playoffs for the seconnd year in a row, but lost to the eventual AFC Champion New England Patriots.

==== 2026 season ====
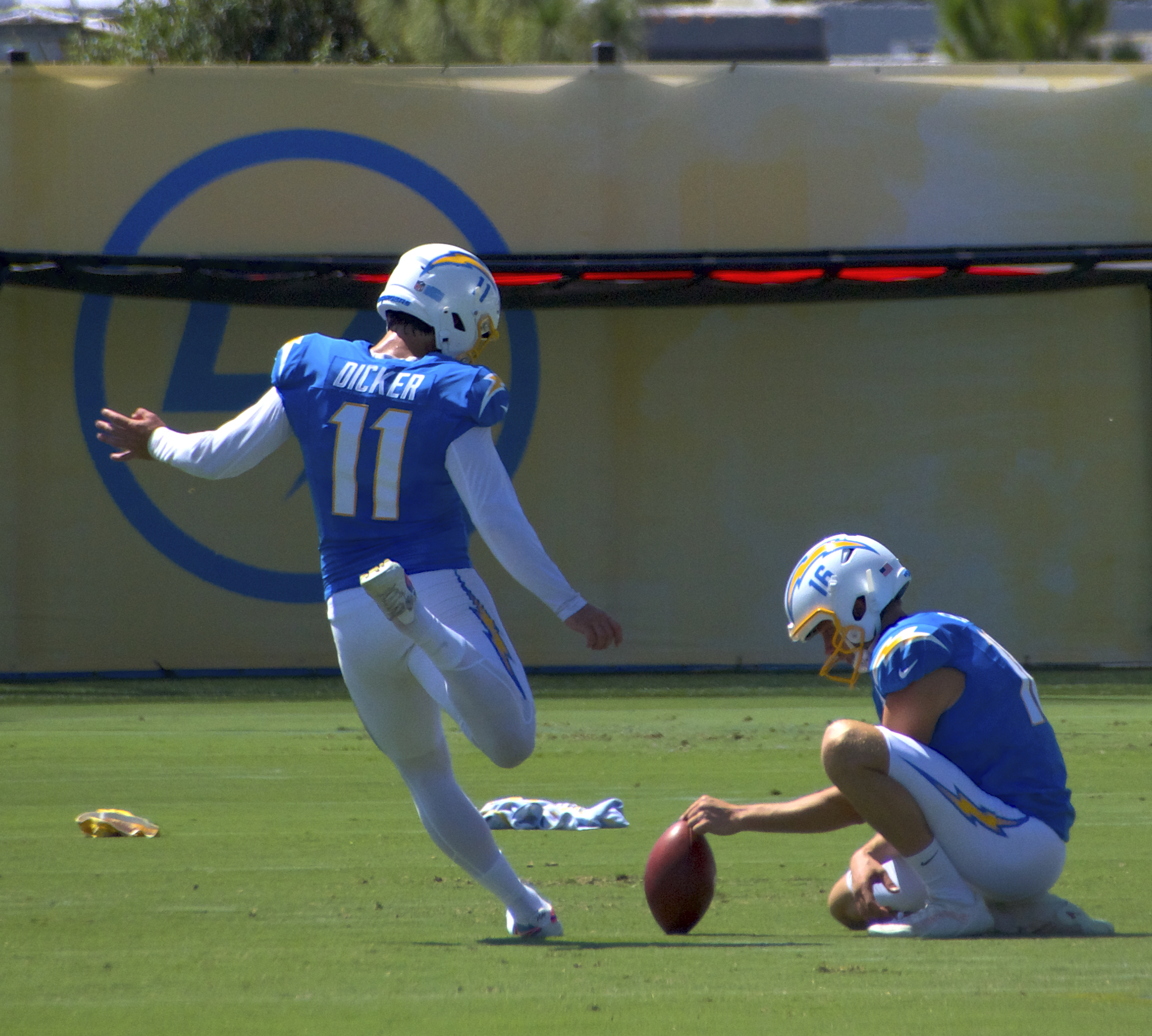
Dicker (left) practicing a field goal during 2026 training camp

Dicker returned to the Chargers in the 2026 season. In their first pre-season game, Dicker completed two field goals and one extra point.

== NFL career statistics ==
Legend
	NFL record
**Bold**	Career high

=== Regular season ===
General			Field goals					PATs			Kickoffs			Points
Season	Team	GP	FGM	FGA	FG%	Blck	Long	XPM	XPA	XP%	KO	Avg	TBs	Pts
2022	PHI	1	2	2	**100.0%**	0	48	2	2	**100.0%**	5	**65.4**	4	8
2022	LAC	10	19	20	95.0%	0	48	22	22	**100.0%**	50	63.8	42	79
2023	LAC	17	31	33	93.9%	**1**	55	**35**	35	**100.0%**	81	63.8	**68**	128
2024	LAC	17	**39**	**42**	92.9%	0	**59**	33	**36**	91.7%	**94**	63.0	65	**150**
2025	LAC	17	38	41	92.7%	0	**59**	34	35	97.1%	90	61.2	16	148
2026	LAC	9	18	20	90.0%	0	52	12	12	100.0%	39	59.0	7	66
Career		71	147	158	93.0%	1	59	138	142	97.2%	359	63.0	202	579

=== Playoffs ===
General			Field goals					PATs			Kickoffs			Points
Season	Team	GP	FGM	FGA	FG%	Blck	Long	XPM	XPA	XP%	KO	Avg	TBs	Pts
2022	LAC	1	**3**	**4**	75.0%	0	**50**	**3**	**3**	**100.0%**	**7**	62.3	2	**12**
2024	LAC	1	2	2	**100.0%**	0	39	0	1	0.0%	4	**66.0**	**3**	6
2025	LAC	1	1	1	**100.0%**	0	21	0	0	—	2	60.0	0	3
Career		3	6	7	85.7%	0	50	3	4	75.0%	13	62.9	5	21

== Personal life ==
Dicker is a Christian. He is engaged to Annie Buerk. Dicker was given the nickname "Dicker the Kicker" by his seventh grade science teacher.
