= Atlas Tract =

Island in California

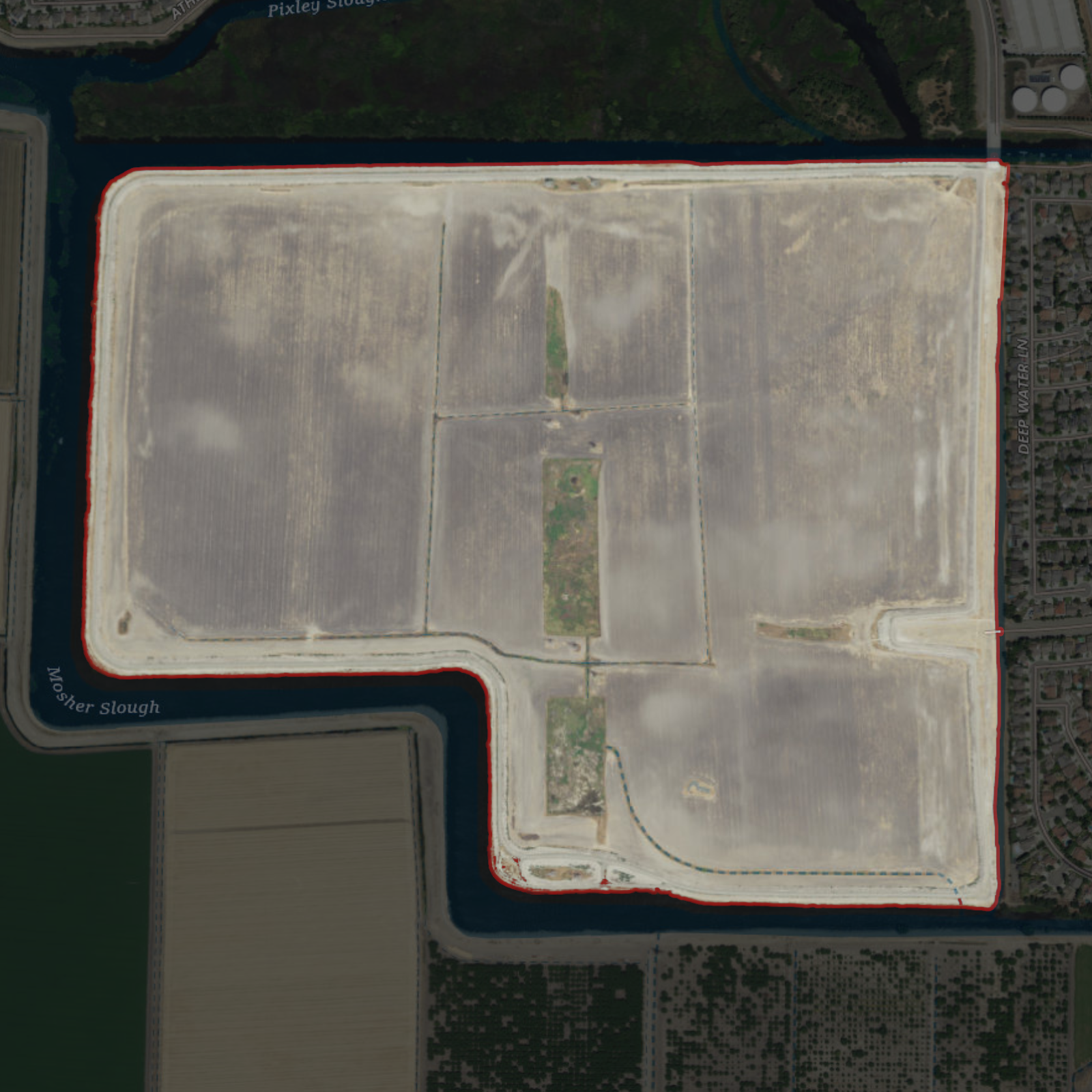
- USGS aerial imagery of the Atlas Tract

- Location within Sacramento-San Joaquin River Delta Location within California Location within the United States

Geography
- Location: Northern California
- Coordinates: 38°02′09″N 121°22′58″W
- Adjacent to: Sacramento–San Joaquin River Delta
- Area: 360 acres (150 ha)
- Highest elevation: 0 ft (0 m)

Administration
- United States
- State: California
- County: San Joaquin

The Atlas Tract (formerly known as the Hartland Tract) is an island in the Sacramento–San Joaquin River Delta, in San Joaquin County, California, United States. It has been used for agriculture since it was first reclaimed in the late 19th century.

== Geography ==
The Atlas Tract's boundaries are coterminous with Reclamation District 2126 (which was formed in 1989); they are located entirely within the city of Stockton. The Atlas Tract is rectangular, except for a small rectangular cutout in the southwest corner. The surface is flat, without significant change in elevation; the United States Geological Survey measured its overall elevation as 0 ft (0 m) in 1981. It is mostly planted with crops, and is surrounded by 3.08 miles (5.0 km) of levees. Its coordinates are 38°02′09″N 121°22′58″W. It has a Mediterranean climate.

To the north of the Atlas Tract lies the Bishop Tract, from which it is separated by Bear Creek and Pixley Slough. To its west and south, across Mosher Slough, is the Shima Tract; to its east is Interstate 5.

== History ==
In the 1880s, the Atlas Tract was first developed and planted by Charles E. Knapp, a real estate investor and employee of the Southern Pacific company. At the time, its largest landowners were Judge Cooney and Dr. S. F. Long, of San Francisco. By 1915, livestock were being raised on the tract by M. Goldstein; in 1935, the tract was still used for ranching and was the location of the Biaga ranch.

In 1967, the First Stockton Corporation proposed to develop a man-made marina and lake there. The Stockton Planning Commission endorsed this proposal, but the county of San Joaquin had delayed approval of excavation permits. The marina and park were to be constructed by removing 4,350,000 cubic yards (3,330,000 m^{3}) of material, to be used for nearby freeway construction. In December, it was announced that county officials had approved the plan, which was expected to be completed around 1970. However, no such developments are shown in topographic maps from 1978, 1993, 1997, or 2015. In 2006, the Atlas Tract was aerially sprayed to kill mosquitoes suspected of carrying the West Nile virus.

As of 2017, the Atlas Tract was owned by the Alex and Faye Spanos Family Trust, and used solely for agriculture (being used to grow small grains and hay). At that time, there were no residences on the land, but a large-scale residential development had been proposed on the tract (with potentially as many as 1,400 lots). In 2015, the population was 0; the San Joaquin County Local Agency Formation Commission projected a population of 42,000 by 2045.

== See also ==
- List of islands of California
