= All the Money in the World (soundtrack) =

All the Money in The World (Original Motion Picture Soundtrack)

Film score by Daniel Pemberton
- Released: December 22, 2017
- Recorded: 2017
- Studios: Abbey Road Studios, London; AIR Studios, London; The Pool, London
- Genre: Film score
- Length: 69:37
- Label: Sony Classical
- Producer: Daniel Pemberton

Daniel Pemberton chronology
Mark Felt: The Man Who Brought Down the White House (2017)	All the Money in the World (2017)	Black Mirror: USS Callister (2017)

All the Money in The World (Original Motion Picture Soundtrack) is the film score to the 2017 film All the Money in the World directed by Ridley Scott starring Michelle Williams, Christopher Plummer and Mark Wahlberg. The film score is composed by Daniel Pemberton and performed by the London Chamber Orchestra. The album was released through Sony Classical Records on December 22, 2017, three days before the film's release.

== Development ==
Daniel Pemberton composed the film score after previously working with Scott on The Counselor (2013). Before working on the project, he started researching on the sounds and found very rural folk music in Sardinia, which he liked it. However, when he read the script and watching the final edit, he was unsure how it would fit in the film. As they managed to use a small bit in the film, Pemberton travelled to Sardinia to record the folk sounds with the locals there, calling it an exciting process.

Pemberton noted the film has different elements for a composer, especially based on the world of Getty and the world of kidnappers and wanted to tie them together. Hence, Scott wanted a big theme that could be used in different ways. The piano-based theme was heard in the opening of the film, but Pemberton enhanced the sounds with traditional Italian folk sounds and musical bangs, along with traditional orchestra and operatic elements along with guitar sounds.

The film faced casting changes after Kevin Spacey, who played Getty, was accused of sexual misconduct allegations and Christopher Plummer was recast in that role with those portions being reshot. Because of the last-minute changes in post-production, usual composers had to be swapped in the role. However, Scott was insisted on Pemberton's involvement despite the reshoots and post-production changes. The score was recorded in London at the Abbey Road Studios, AIR Studios and the Pool, while the score was performed by London Chamber Orchestra.

== Reception ==
Sean Wilson of Set the Tape called the score "very impressive", noting that "[a] shorter album presentation curtailing some of the more atmospheric noodling would have worked wonders, but when the score hits big, it's a powerful reminder why Daniel Pemberton is one of the greatest composers working in film today." Todd McCarthy of The Hollywood Reporter praised the "fine score", while Hannah Strong of Little White Lies noted that Pemberton's score had "shades of Handel's sublime Sarabande".

== Track listing ==
No.	Title	Length
1.	"All the Money in the World" (Rome 1973)	4:03
2.	"To Be a Getty"	3:05
3.	"The Minotaur"	2:10
4.	"We Are Kidnappers"	2:20
5.	"Paparazzi"	3:37
6.	"Hadrian's Villa"	2:04
7.	"How Much Would You Pay?"	2:23
8.	"Learn A Lesson"	1:44
9.	"All the Money in the World" (Getty Arrivals)	1:54
10.	"The Waltz of the Newspapers"	0:56
11.	"Masterpiece"	2:23
12.	"The Red Brigade"	1:25
13.	"Police Raid"	5:10
14.	"Safety"	1:09
15.	"Sold to an Investor"	2:34
16.	"Imprisoned"	2:40
17.	"Danger Sign"	3:23
18.	"Editorial"	0:46
19.	"The Collector"	2:54
20.	"Getty Pays"	2:46
21.	"Hadrian's Model"	2:17
22.	"Money Drop"	4:32
23.	"Paul Runs"	1:31
24.	"Escape, December 15th, 1973,"	6:27
25.	"J. Paul Getty"	3:09
26.	"All the Money in the World" (Credits)	2:15
Total length:		69:37

== Personnel ==
Credits adapted from liner notes:

- Music composer and producer – Daniel Pemberton
- Recording – Lewis Jones, Sam Okell
- Mixing – Sam Okell
- Mastering – Simon Gibson
- Technical score engineer – Alex Ferguson, George Oulton, Laurence Anslow, Paul Pritchard, Stefano Civetta
- Stem preparation – Jonathan Sims
- Music coordinator – Darrell Alexander
- Copyist – Jill Streater
- Booklet editor and design – WLP Ltd.
- Music clearance and licensing – Mark Cavell
- Executive in charge of music – Spring Aspers
- Product development – Jennifer Liebeskind

Orchestra

- Orchestra – Chamber Orchestra Of London
- Orchestrators – Andrew Skeet, Nathan Klein
- Orchestra conductor – Andrew Skeet
- Contractor – Gareth Griffiths

Choir

- Choir – RSVP Voices
- Choir conductor – Rob Johnston
- Sacred tenor vocals – Christopher Bowen
- Choral translation – Nicholas Holland
- Italian voices – Claudio D'Antoni, Giuseppe Sanna, Marco Marrella, Mimmino Maisola

Instruments

- Accordion – Mark Bousie
- Bass – Jonathan Noyce
- Drums – Alex Thomas
- Ethnic flute – Jan Hendrickse
- Guitar – Daniel Pemberton, Huw Davies, Leo Abrahams
- Harpsichord – Steven Devine
- Kanun – Maya Youssef
- Percussion – Paul Clarvis, Rob Farrer

== Accolades ==
Award	Category	Recipient	Result	Ref.
Hollywood Music in Media Awards	Best Original Score – Feature Film	Daniel Pemberton	Nominated	
International Film Music Critics Association	Best Original Score for a Drama Film	Daniel Pemberton	Nominated	
