= Mustang Memorial Field =

Multi-purpose stadium in California, U.S.

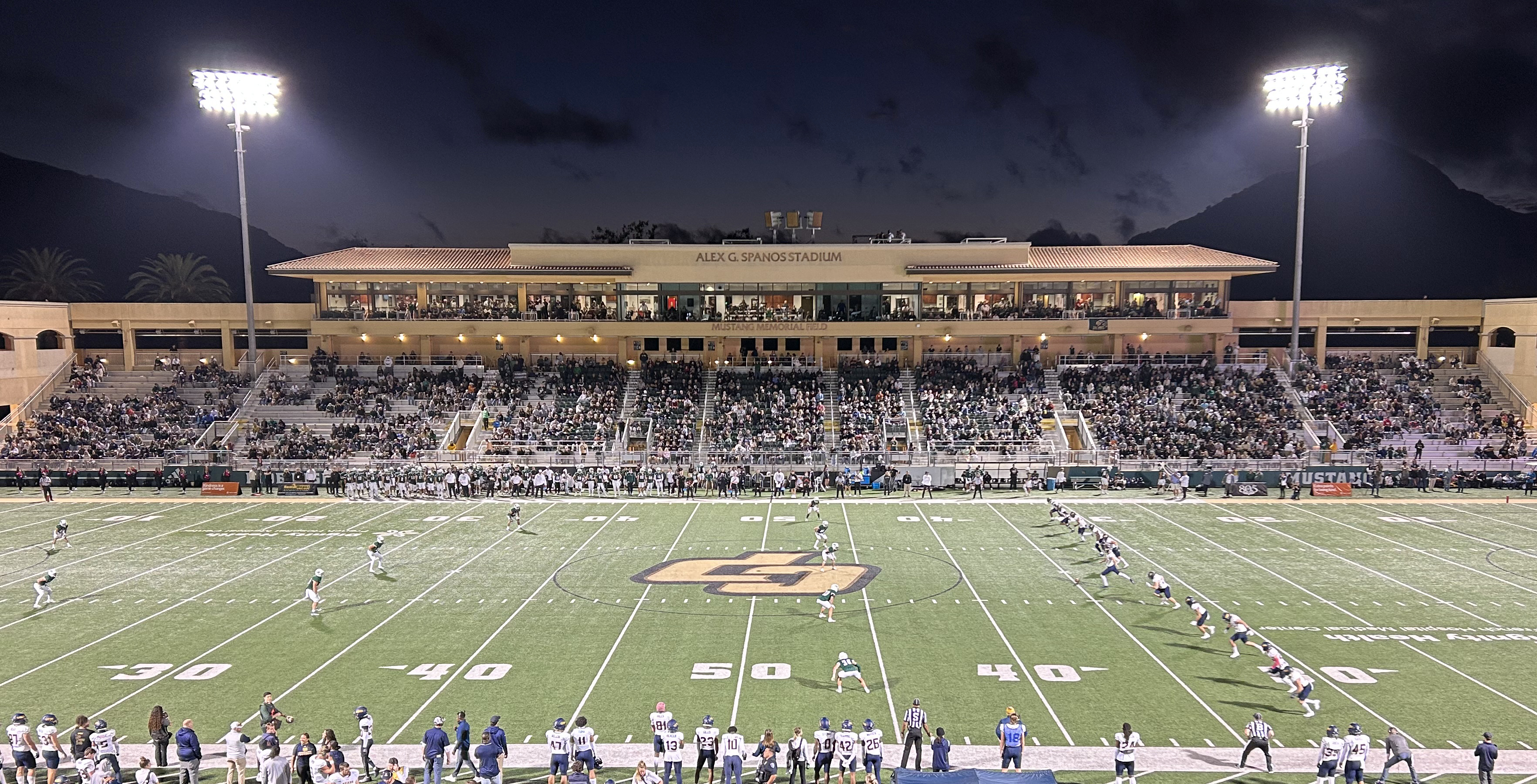
- The stadium during a Cal Poly v Northern Colorado football game in 2023

- Location in the United States Location in California
- Interactive map of Mustang Memorial Field
- Full name: Mustang Memorial Field; Presented by Dignity Health French Hospital Medical Center (2023–present)
- Former names: Alex G. Spanos Stadium (2006–2022); Mustang Stadium (1935–2005)
- Address: 1 Grand Avenue; San Luis Obispo, Ca; U.S.
- Coordinates: 35°17′54″N 120°39′54″W
- Owner: Cal Poly State University
- Operator: Cal Poly State Univ. Athletics
- Capacity: 11,075
- Executive suites: 8 Skyboxes
- Surface: FieldTurf (2022–present); Natural grass (1935–2021)
- Scoreboard: Daktronics Video

Construction
- Groundbreaking: September 10, 2005
- Opened: 1935; 91 years ago
- Renovated: November 2006

Tenants
- Cal Poly Mustangs (NCAA) teams: football; men's and women's soccer

Website
- gopoly.com/mustang-memorial-field

Mustang Memorial Field, formerly known as Mustang Stadium and then Alex G. Spanos Stadium, is an 11,075-seat multi-purpose stadium located on the campus of California Polytechnic State University (Cal Poly) in San Luis Obispo, California, United States. It is the home field of the Cal Poly Mustangs football and soccer teams.

The stadium was renovated largely from funding from alumnus Alex Spanos (1923–2018), an American billionaire real estate developer, founder of the A. G. Spanos Companies, and majority owner of the San Diego Chargers of the National Football League (NFL).

== History and renovation ==
Originally opened 91 years ago in 1935, the stadium was expanded in 2006 to its current capacity and, following the completion of a $21.5-million renovation, was then renamed Alex G. Spanos Stadium in a pregame ceremony on November 18.

The recognition and subsequent renaming for the ensuing 15 years was the result of an $8 million donation to renovate Mustang Stadium by Alex Spanos, the largest single donation in the school's history at the time. At the next season's home opener following the dedication, Cal Poly debuted a tailgating section perpendicular to the stadium's entrance along South Perimeter Road, and set a sellout record of 11,075 fans as the Mustang football team defeated Weber State.

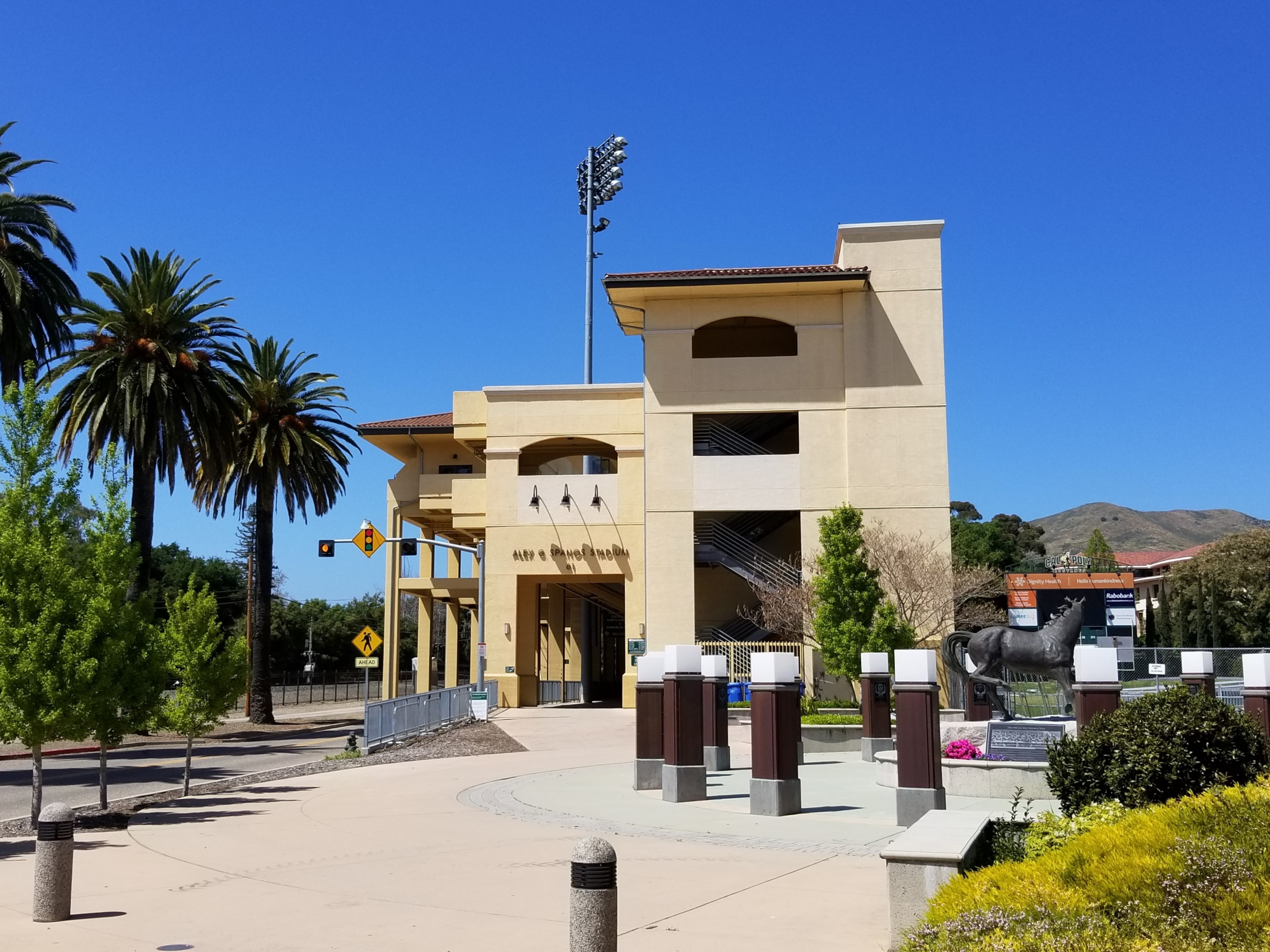
Alex G. Spanos Stadium grandstand

Previous expansions to the stadium's steel east-side grandstands were completed in 1972 and 1979.

Artist renderings of further increasing the stadium's capacity to 25,000 were released in 2010.

In 2013, Cal Poly replaced the south end zone rented stands with permanent aluminum stands improving handicapped access. Additionally, Cal Poly renovated the lower portion of the older east-side bleachers to add handicapped seats and improve accessibility and egress. The new south endzone stands increased capacity by 345 seats.

The playing field is aligned north-northwest to south-southeast at an approximate elevation of three hundred feet (90 m) above sea level. Formerly natural grass, FieldTurf was installed in 2022.

In November 2022, the university announced the facility would be renamed Mustang Memorial Field Presented by Dignity Health French Hospital Medical Center, reflecting a new 10-year naming rights agreement between the college and the healthcare organization. The first official events to be held at the facility under the new name were the semifinals and championship match of the 2022 Big West Women's Soccer Tournament.

=== Baltimore Colts preseason training camp ===
From August 4–14, 1969, the Baltimore Colts, featuring Johnny Unitas, Bubba Smith, and head coach Don Shula, spent nearly two weeks holding a preseason training camp in the stadium, with practice and scrimmages open to the public. The Colts played the San Diego Chargers in a preseason game on August 2, before heading north to visit the Oakland Raiders on August 9, in-between their stay in San Luis Obispo.

=== CIF Championship football games ===
Five times in decades past, each when various CIF Southern Section championship high school football games featured both teams from either San Luis Obispo County or Santa Barbara County facing in head-to-head matchups, the field served as the neutral host-site location for the title games. The games featuring entirely Central Coast Athletic Association members included the 1990 game, when a crowd of over 9,000 fans attended and future NFL first-round draft choice Napoleon Kaufman rushed for 84 yards and compiled 30 yards receiving:

- 1978 (8-Man Division): Coast Union 62, Templeton 24
- 1980 (Northwestern Division): San Luis Obispo 7, Lompoc 0
- 1990 (Div. VII): Lompoc 12, Arroyo Grande 7
- 1995 (Div. XI): Morro Bay 51, Templeton 15
- 1998 (Div. IV): Arroyo Grande 31, San Luis Obispo 14

In addition to the intra-county championship games, a sixth CIF title game, this time including neighboring Ventura County, was also held at the former Mustang Stadium before the site's extensive renovations:

- 1999 (Div. IV): Westlake 24, San Luis Obispo 21

=== Major League Soccer exhibitions ===
Six total times since the mid-2000s renovation, the stadium hosted MLS preseason exhibition matches, sometimes drawing upwards of 4,300 fans, including in 2011 and 2012 when USMNT forward Chris Wondolowski took the field:

- February 24, 2008: San Jose Earthquakes (W, 2–1) vs. Columbus Crew and D.C. United (D, 0-0)
- February 13/15, 2009: San Jose Earthquakes (W, 3–2) vs. Seattle Sounders FC and vs. Houston Dynamo (W, 2–0)
- March 4, 2011: San Jose Earthquakes (W, 1–0) vs. Colorado Rapids
- February 10, 2012: San Jose Earthquakes (W, 2–1) vs. Colorado Rapids

== Current tenants ==
Cal Poly Mustangs football, as well as the men's and women's soccer teams, play their home games at the stadium.

Meanwhile, in 2023, the city's Mission College Prep Royals began playing Friday night football games in the stadium.

== See also ==
- List of NCAA Division I FCS football stadiums
- Campus memorials at Cal Poly

== Gallery ==
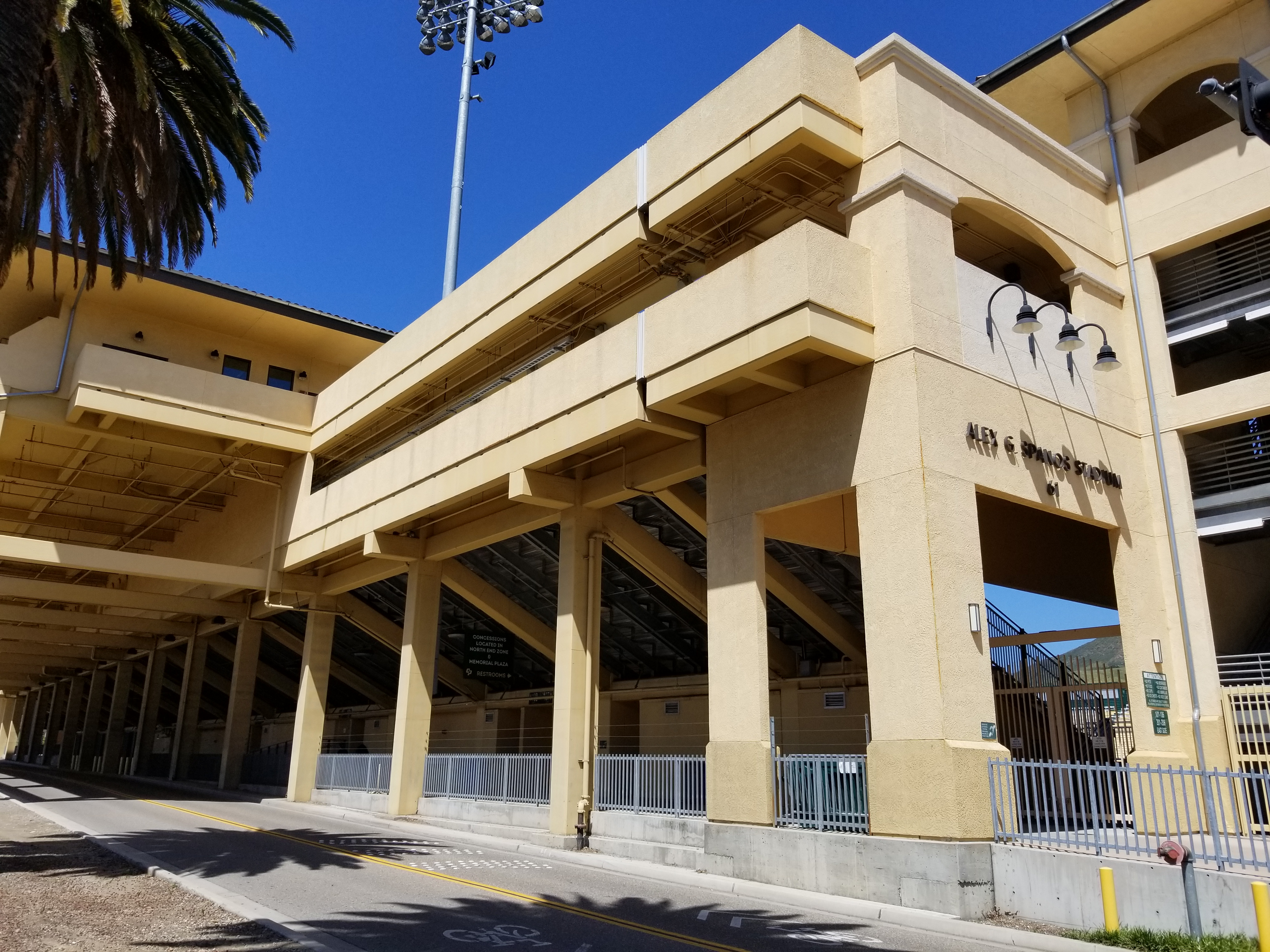
Alex G. Spanos Stadium exterior parallel to California Boulevard

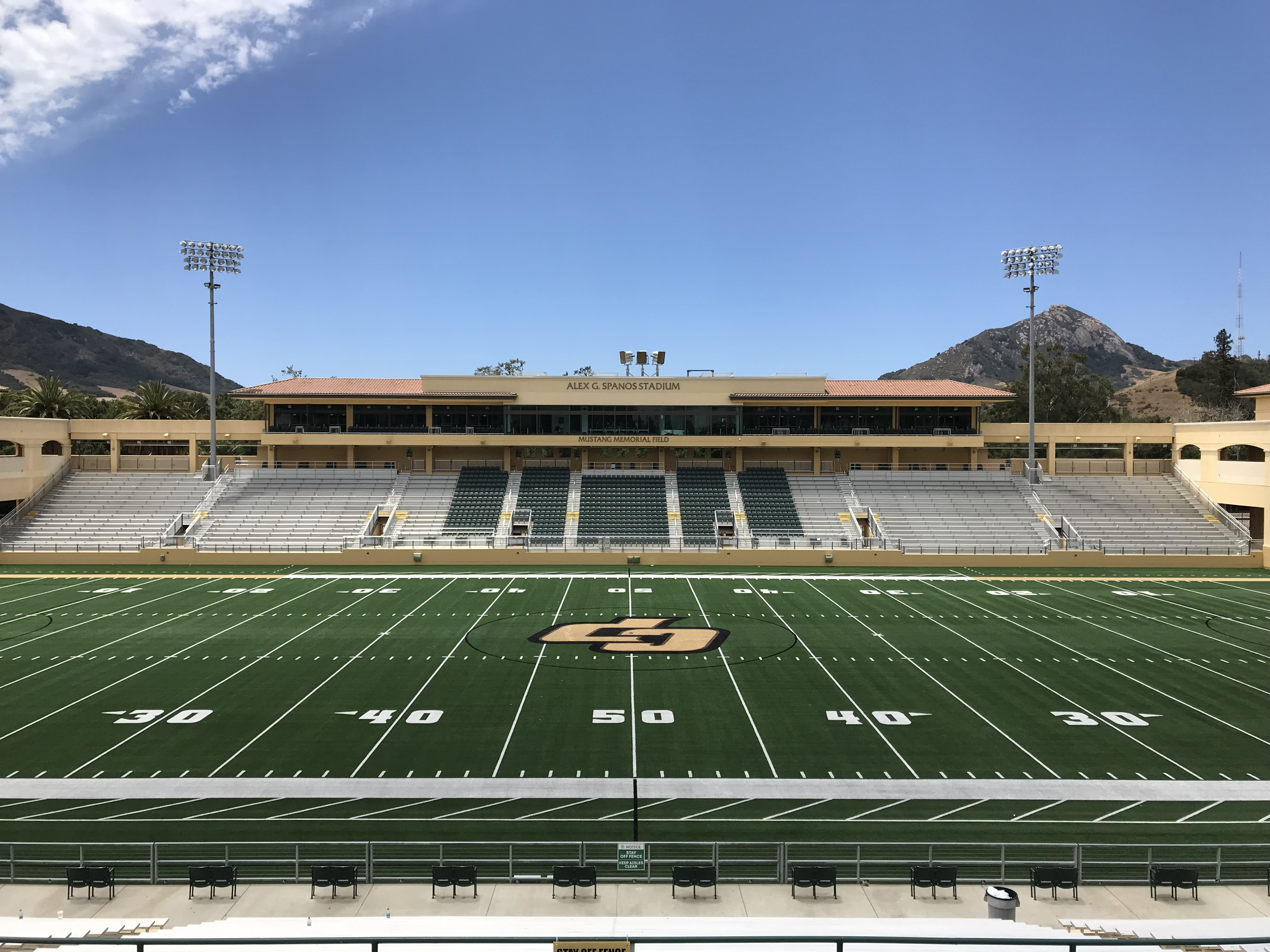
A new surface, FieldTurf Super Elite Vertex Prime, was installed to Alex G. Spanos Stadium at Cal Poly in 2022. With the addition, Cal Poly joined all 11 fellow Big Sky Conference football universities with modern turf field surfaces.

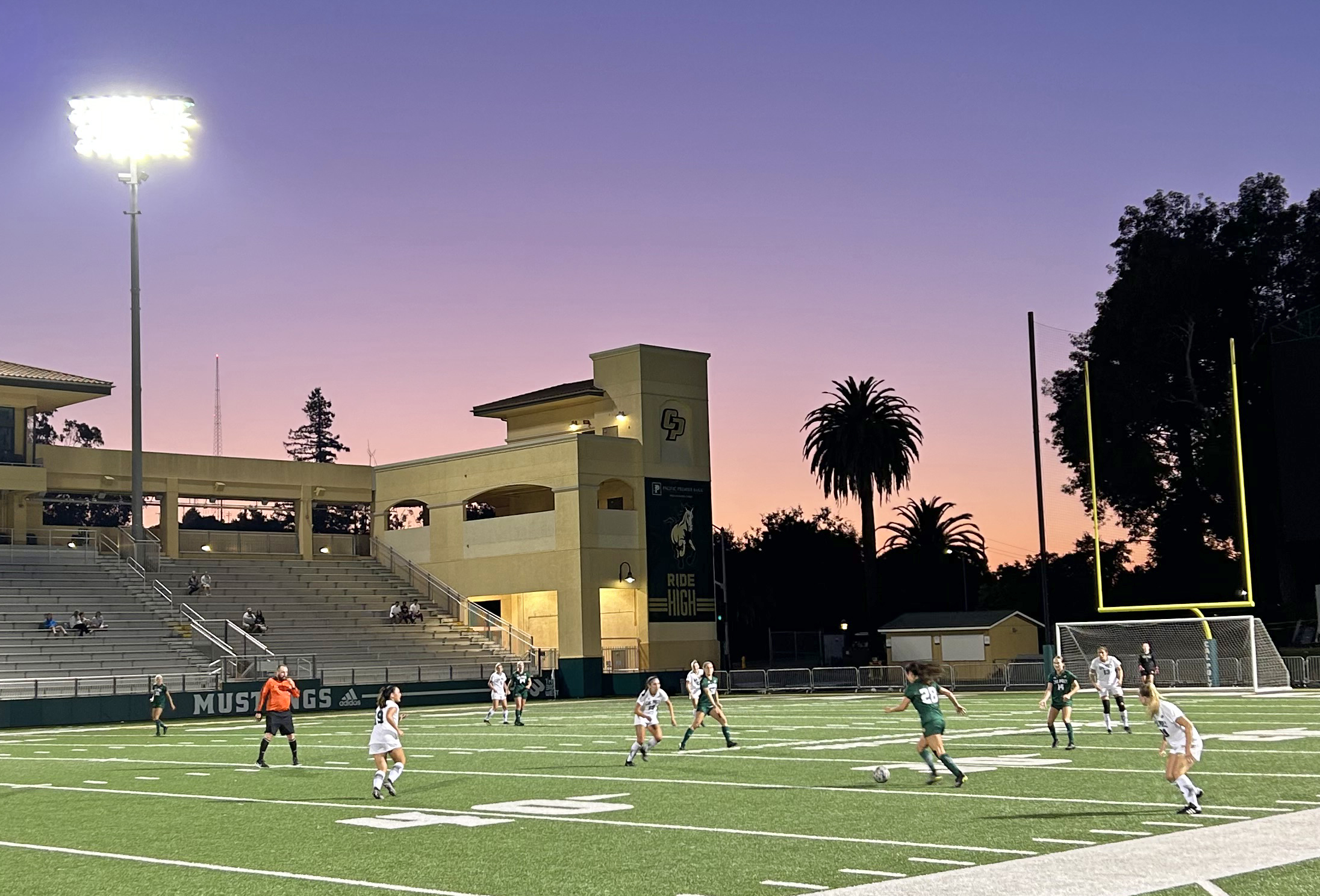
Cal Poly's women's soccer team scrimmages as the sun sets on Mustang Memorial Field during the 2023 preseason.

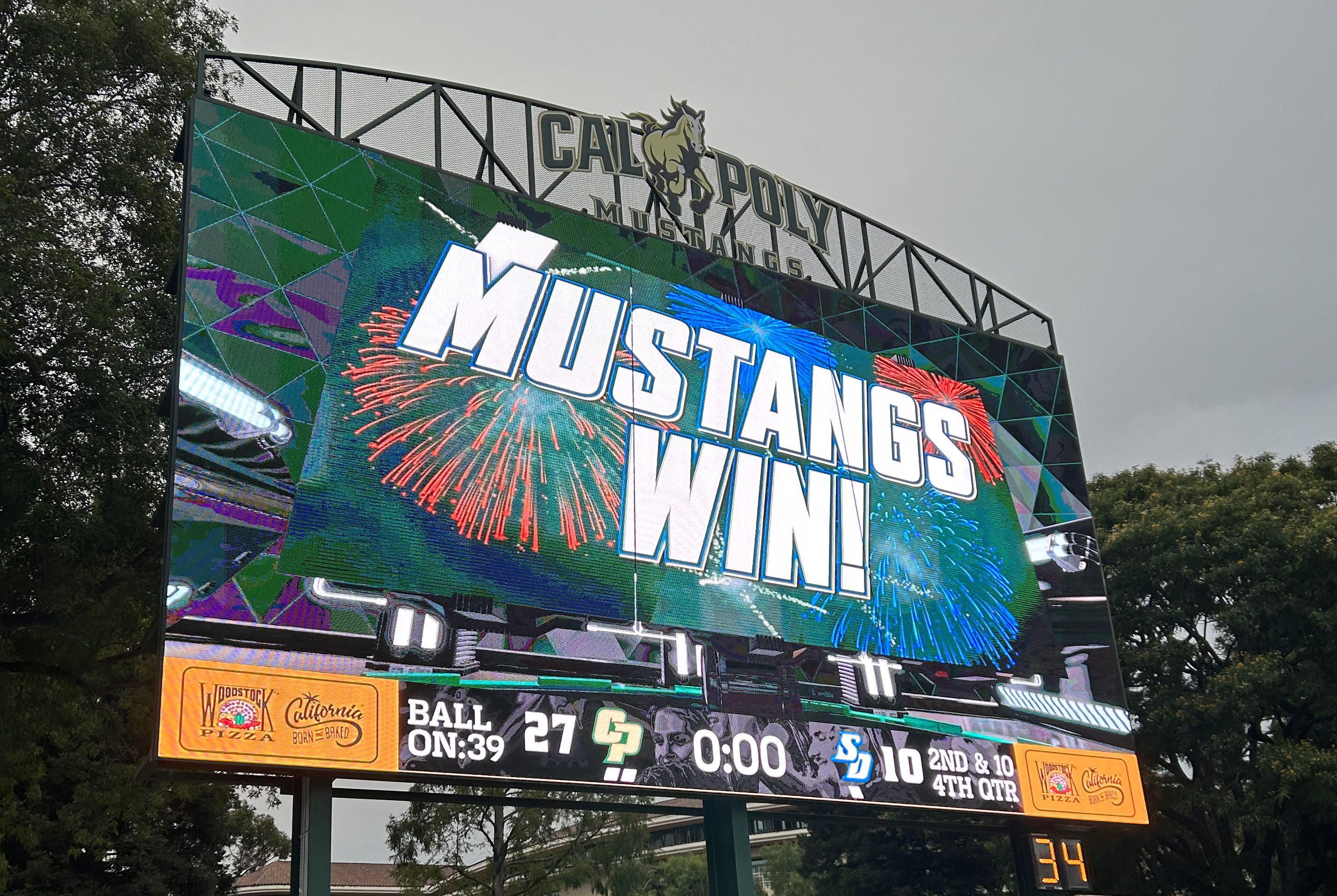
A videoboard newly installed during the summer of 2023 is shown at Cal Poly's Mustang Memorial Field after the fall's home-opening football game in San Luis Obispo.

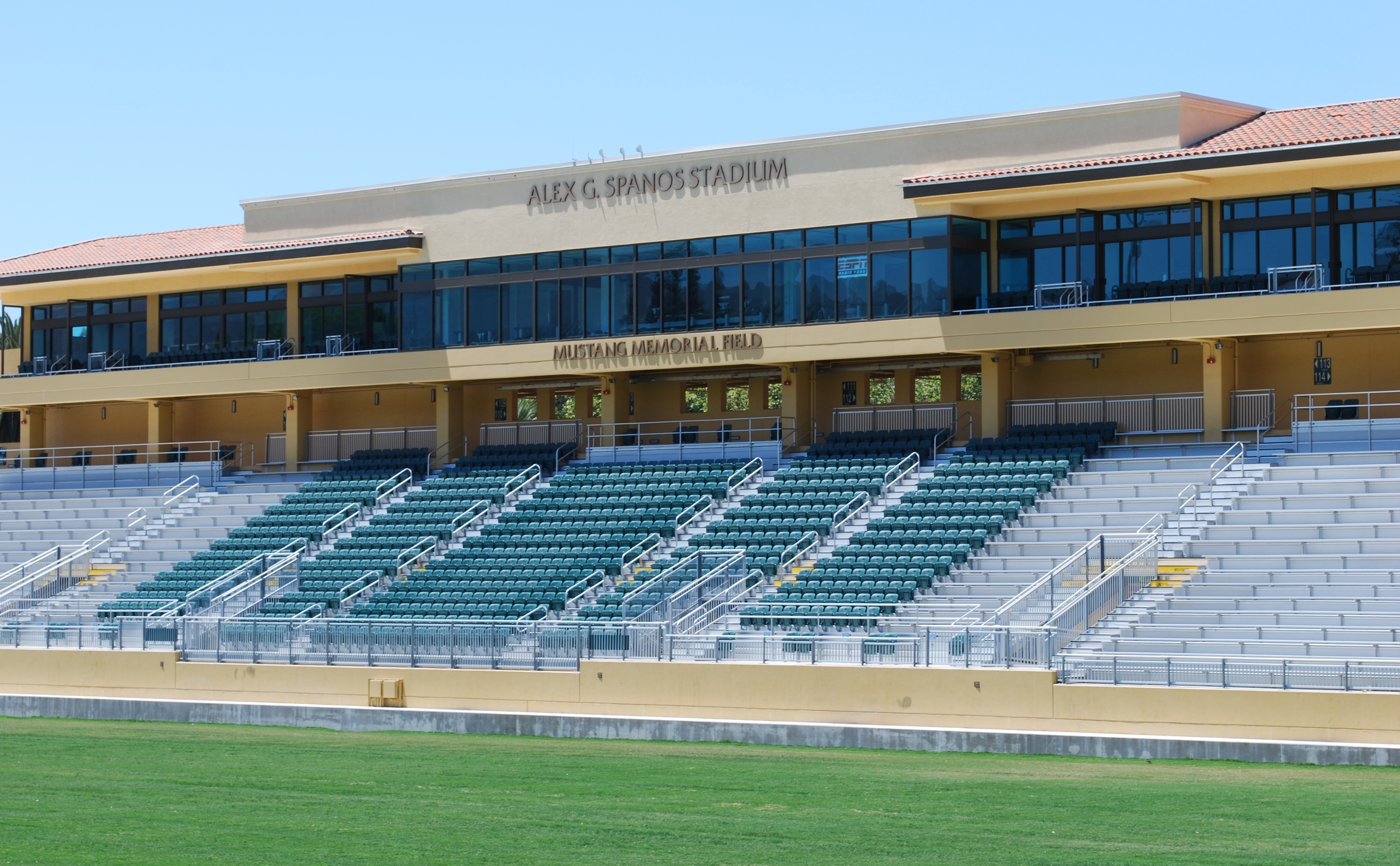
A view of the Alex G. Spanos Stadium skyboxes

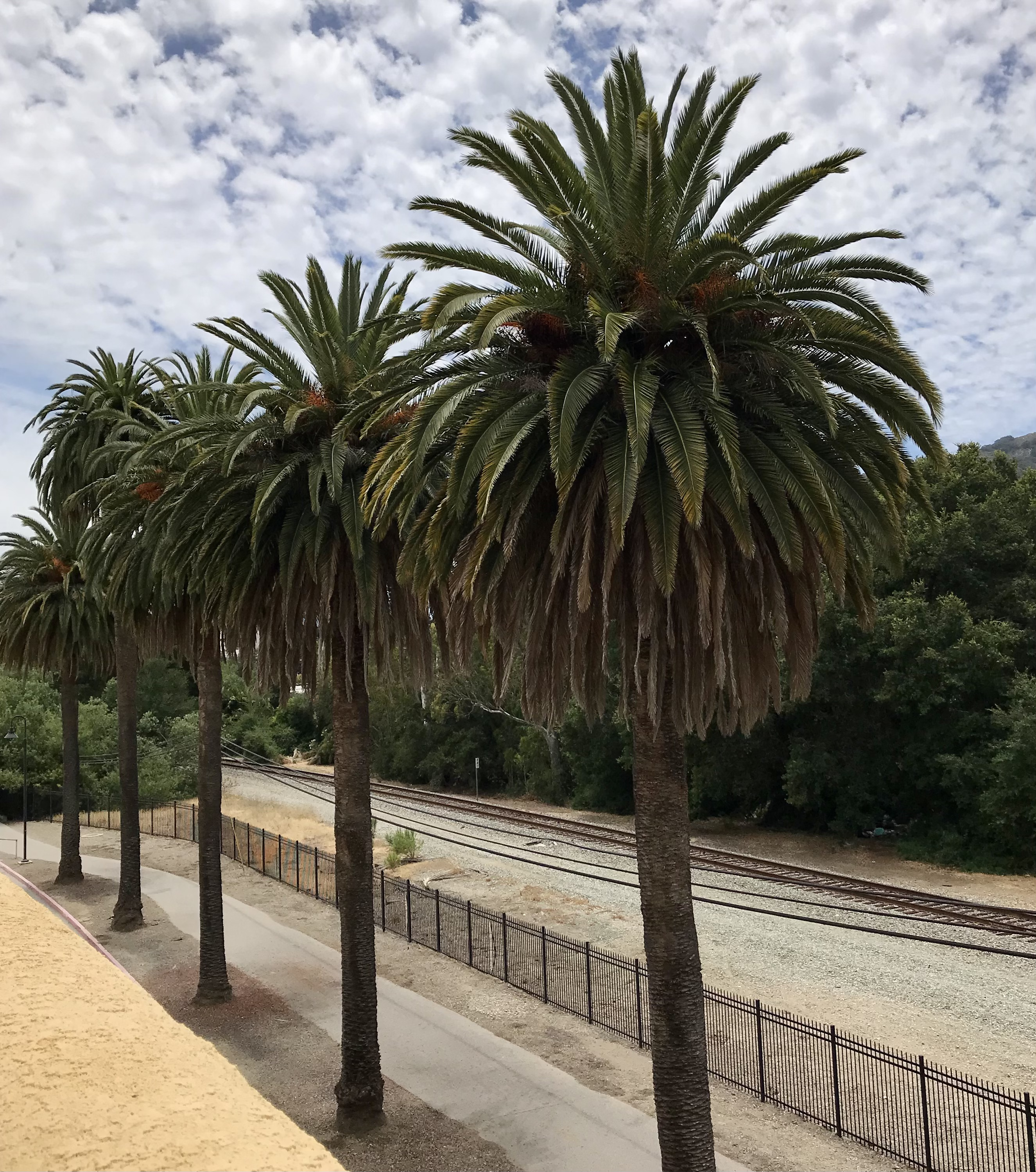
Palm trees lining California Boulevard, parallel to the nearby railroad tracks in San Luis Obispo, surround Alex G. Spanos Stadium at Cal Poly in June 2022.

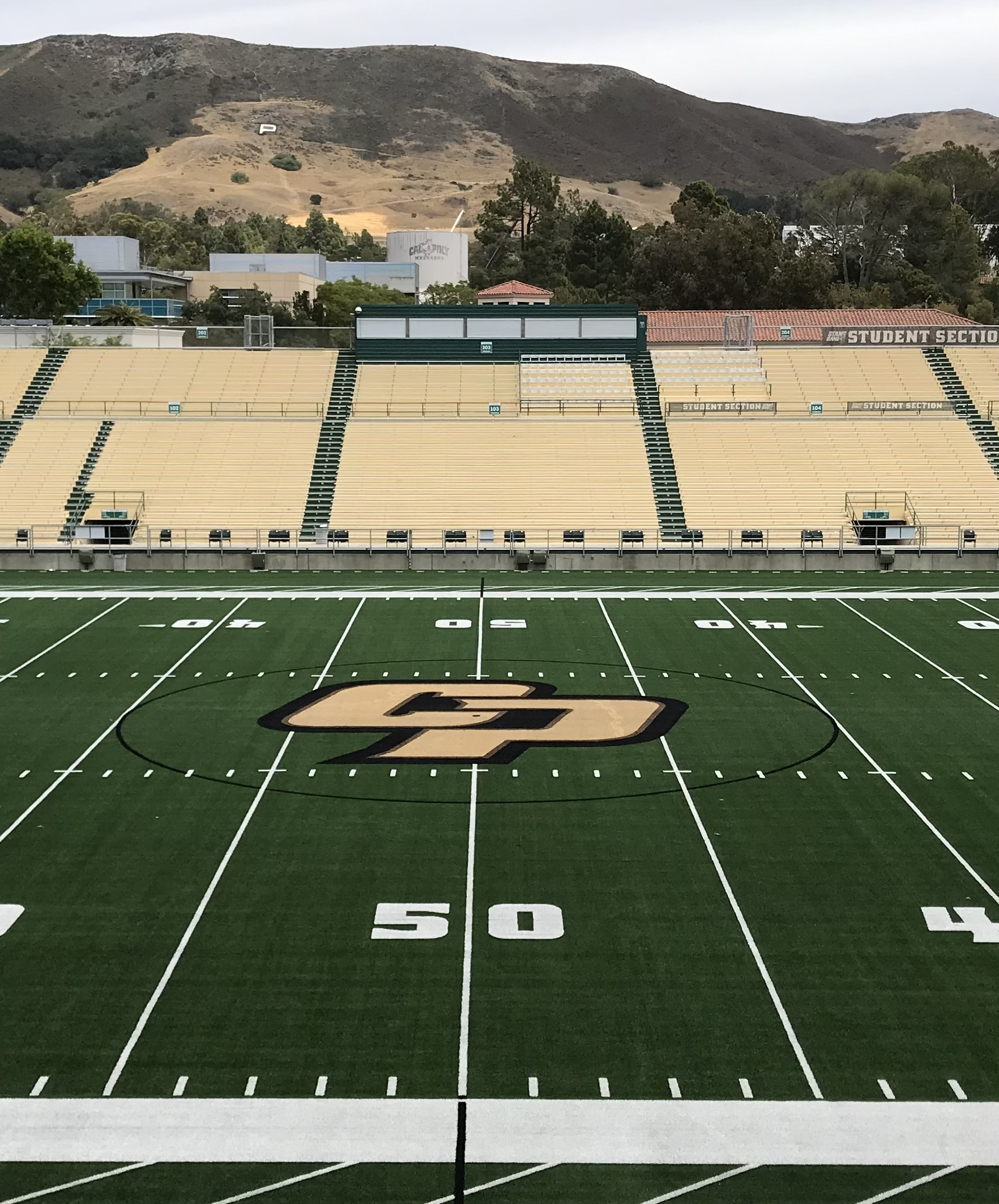
The field at Alex G. Spanos Stadium is shown on the campus of Cal Poly in June 2022, with the university's iconic hillside "P" visible in the background.

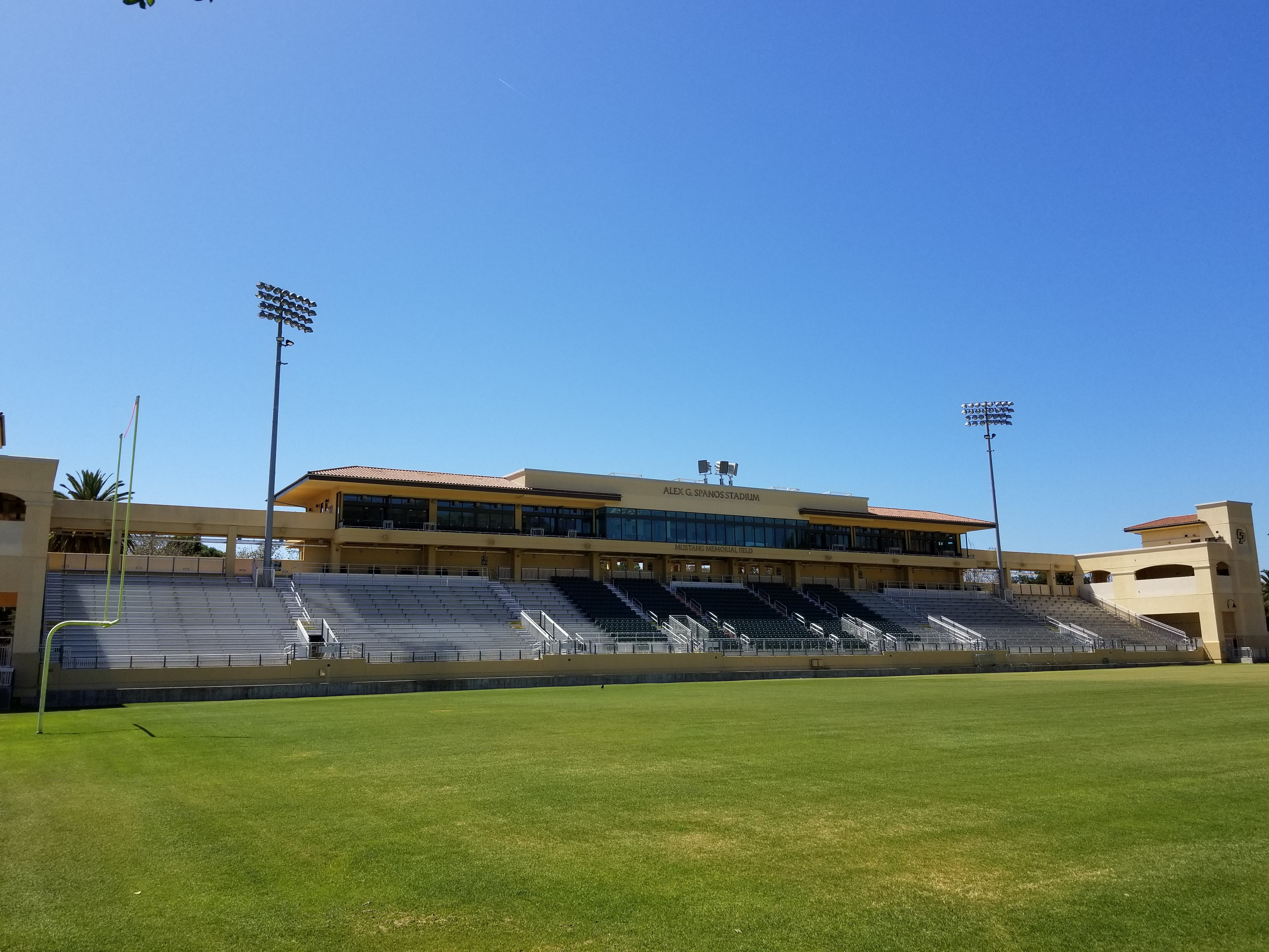
Alex G. Spanos Stadium press box and skyboxes, pictured prior to the renovation of the field surface

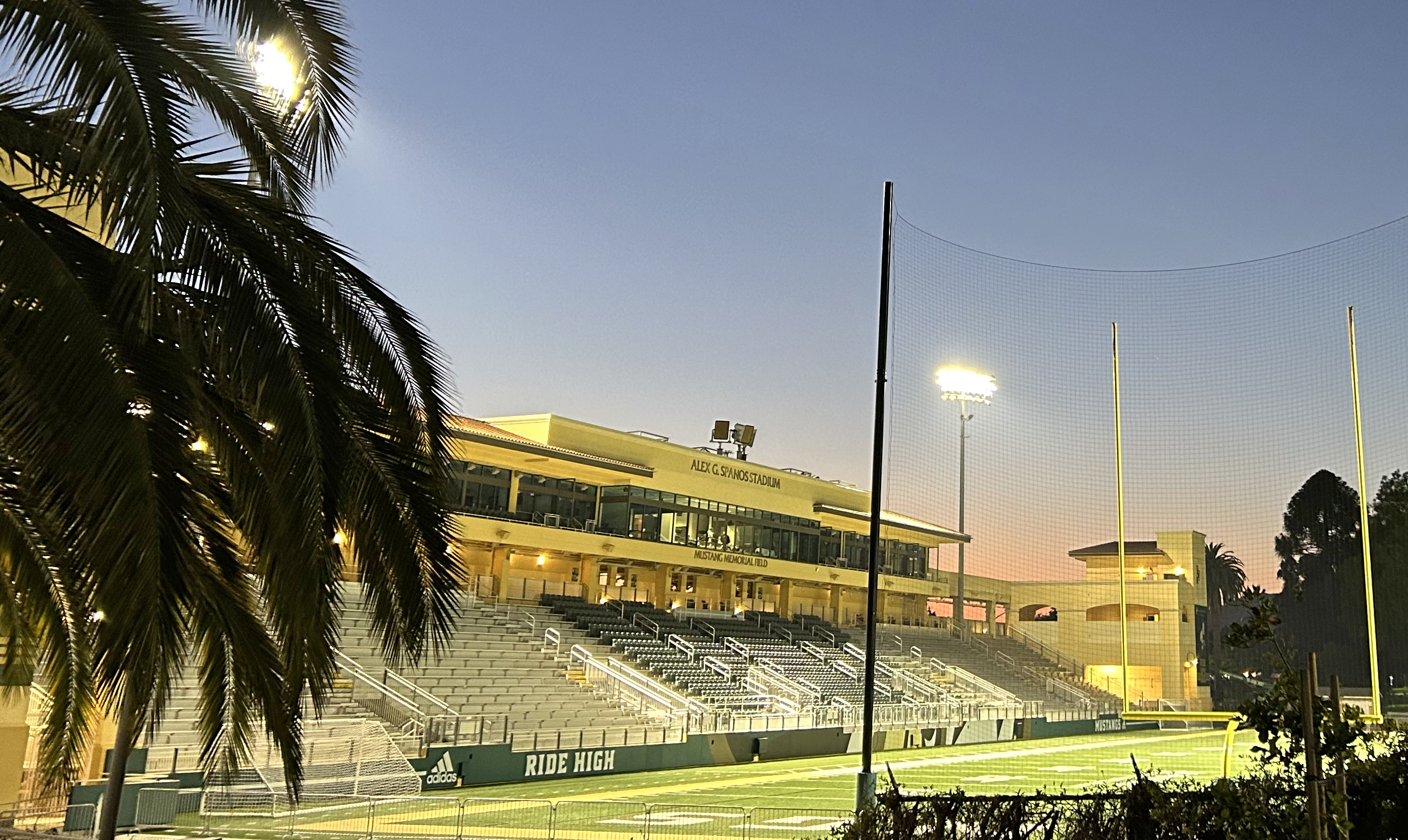
Cal Poly's Mustang Memorial Field is pictured at twilight in 2023

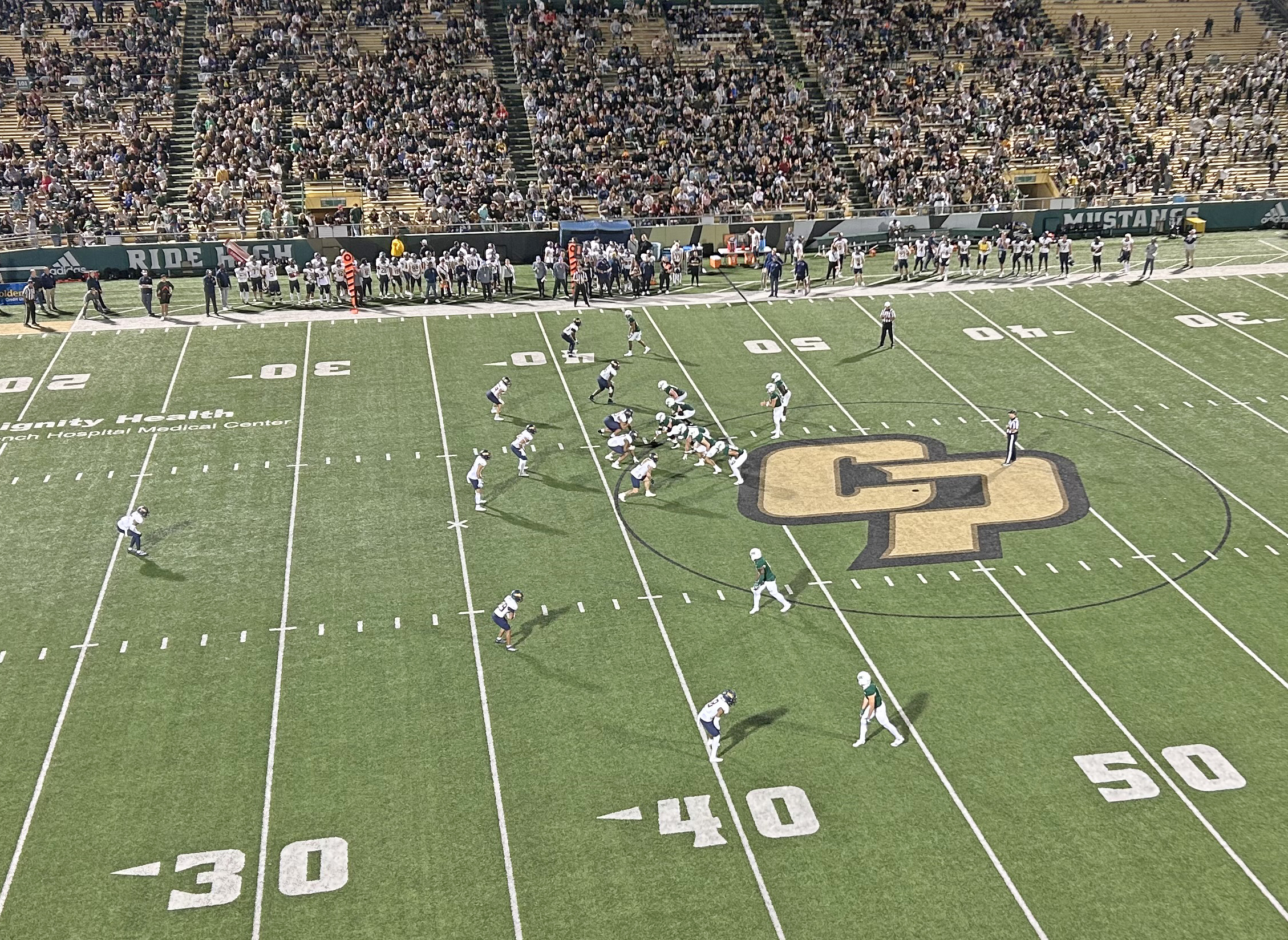
Cal Poly's offense faces Northern Colorado's defense at Mustang Memorial Field in 2023
