= Dean Spanos =

American businessman and sports team owner (born 1950)

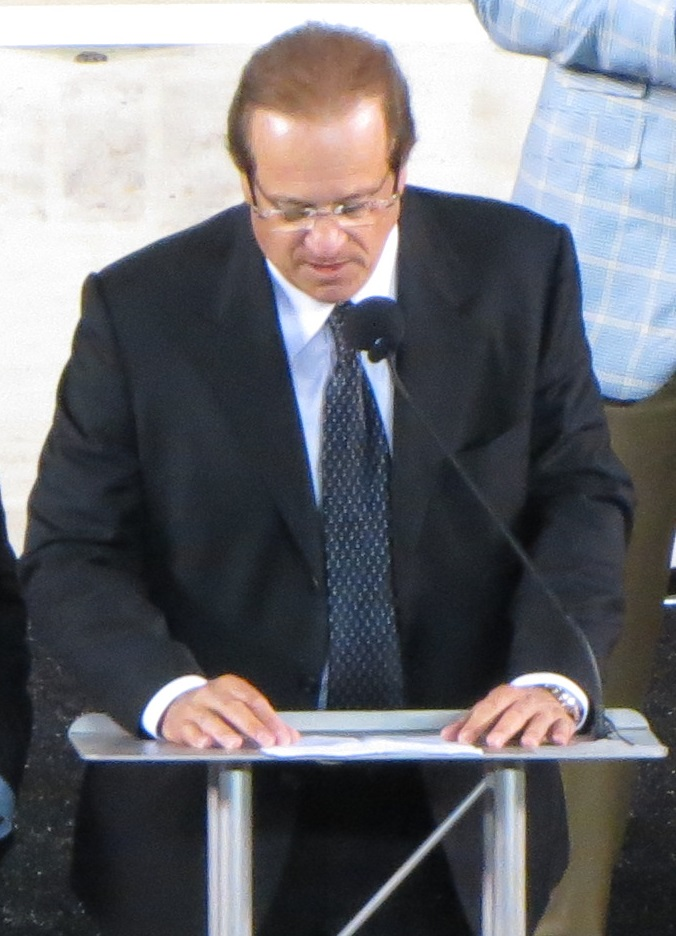
- Spanos in 2012
- Born: Dean Alexander Spanos; May 26, 1950 (age 76); Stockton, California, U.S.
- Education: University of the Pacific
- Occupation: Businessman
- Years active: 1984–present
- Known for: Owner and chairman of the NFL's Los Angeles Chargers franchise
- Board member of: Management Council Executive Committee; Business Ventures Committee (NFL)
- Spouse: Susie Spanos
- Children: 2
- Parent(s): Alex Spanos; Faye Papafaklis

Dean Alexander Spanos (born May 26, 1950) is an American businessman who is the owner and chairman of the San Diego / Los Angeles Chargers of the National Football League (NFL). He is the son of Alex Spanos, who purchased majority interest in the team in 1984. Spanos took over daily operations from his father in 1994, becoming president and CEO, until he passed operations to his own sons in 2015. He took over full ownership after his father's death in 2018.

== Early life and education ==
Spanos was raised in Stockton, California, the son of Alex Spanos and Faye Papafaklis, both of Greek ancestry.

He attended Lincoln High School where he earned varsity letters in football and golf and received the Lincoln High Hall of Fame Award. He graduated from the University of the Pacific in 1972.

== Chargers ==
Spanos was named team president and chief executive officer of the Chargers by his father in early 1994. Under Spanos's leadership, the Chargers made it to Super Bowl XXIX the first season and won 113 games between 2004 and 2014, the fourth-most in the league, which included five AFC West championships and four playoff game wins.

In May 2015, Spanos ceded control of the team to his sons, John and A.G., though he stayed on as chairman to oversee a new stadium process.

After a proposed ballot measure for a hotel tax financed stadium plan in downtown San Diego failed in November 2016 with 43 percent approval, the Chargers weighed their option to return to the Los Angeles market.

In January 2017, Spanos exercised the option to relocate the team to Los Angeles. The move was met with criticism by San Diego due to not being able to find a stadium solution in the city, with 15 years of failed proposals blocked by city officials and business leaders.

The team's temporary headquarters was in Costa Mesa under a 10-year lease until a permanent location in the Los Angeles area was acquired. The 2017 through 2019 seasons were played at a soccer stadium, Dignity Health Sports Park (known as StubHub Center until 2019).

In 2020, construction was completed on the Chargers' new stadium, SoFi Stadium, which is shared with the Los Angeles Rams. The venue is owned and operated by StadCo LA, LLC., a joint partnership with Kroenke Sports & Entertainment and the Los Angeles Chargers. Since his ownership formally began in 2018, the Chargers have reached the postseason three times but have never reached the Super Bowl.

== Philanthropy ==
In 1999, the family launched Chargers Champions through the Community Foundation to support local schools.

In 2011 Spanos held a fundraiser for Rick Perry at a private event at Sacramento. In 2014, the Spanoses donated $500,000 to the University of California, San Diego for the Alex G. Spanos Athletic Performance Center. The donation brought their total support to UCSD to $1.6 million.

He also led the Chargers to partner with the Susan G. Komen Foundation in San Diego in honor of his wife Susie, who is a breast cancer survivor. During his tenure with the Chargers, Spanos created The Chargers Champions All-Star Gala to recognize high school students and educators in the San Diego area. After Hurricane Harvey in 2017, Spanos and the Chargers donated $500,000 to hurricane relief.

== Awards and recognition ==
In 2016, Spanos was ranked number 21 on the USA Today list of 100 most important people in the NFL. He was an honoree at the American Hellenic Council's (AHC) Annual Awards Gala, which recognizes individuals from the Greek-American community.

He was appointed to the board of the John F. Kennedy Center for the Performing Arts in Washington, D.C., in 2006. Spanos received the 2005 Distinguished American Award from the San Diego Chapter of the National Football Foundation. He was also awarded the 2004 Jose A. Cota Award for philanthropy and the Chargers support of law enforcement.

In 2002, Spanos was awarded the Ellis Island Medal of Honor, 16 years after his father received the award. He also was inducted into the DeMolay International Alumni Hall of Fame.

Sporting positions
Preceded by Alex Spanos	Los Angeles Chargers principal owner 2018–present	Incumbent
