= Kevin Spacey sexual misconduct allegations =

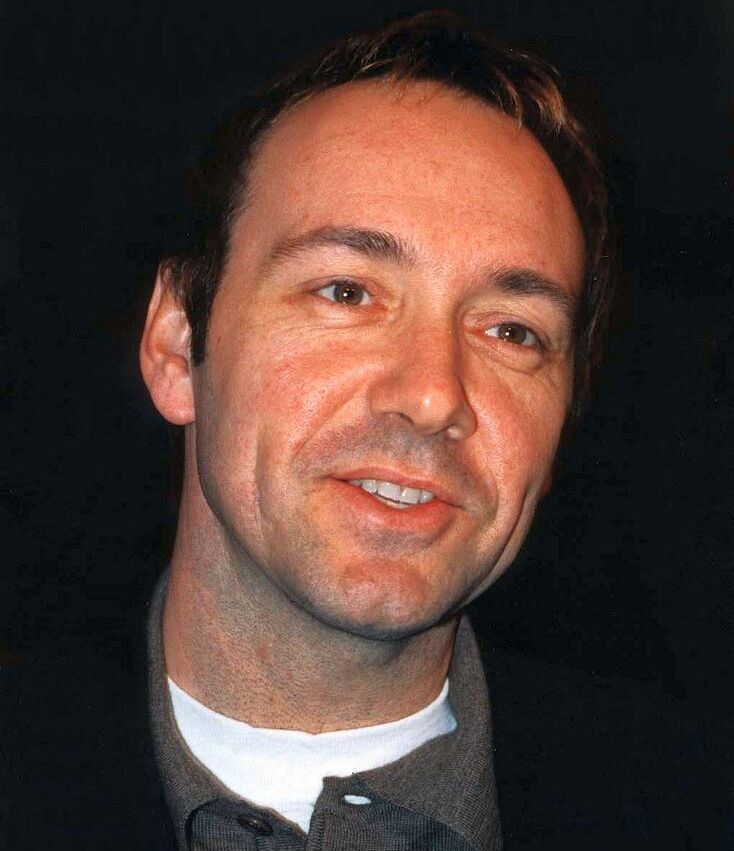
Spacey in 1996

In 2017, American actor Kevin Spacey faced several allegations of sexual misconduct. Those allegations began after Anthony Rapp alleged that Spacey, while appearing intoxicated, made a sexual advance toward him at a party in 1986, when Rapp was 14 and Spacey was 27. Rapp had also shared this story in a 2001 interview with The Advocate, but Spacey's name was redacted from publication to avoid legal disputes and public outing. Spacey stated on Twitter that he did not remember the encounter, but that he owed Rapp "the sincerest apology for what would have been deeply inappropriate drunken behavior" if he had behaved as asserted. On September 9, 2020, Rapp sued Spacey for sexual assault, sexual battery, and intentional infliction of emotional distress under the Child Victims Act. In the subsequent federal civil court proceeding, a jury found that Spacey did not molest Rapp and was found not liable on all counts, with Rapp subsequently ordered by the court to pay Spacey $39,089 for the costs of litigation.

Fifteen others then came forward alleging similar abuse, including Boston anchorwoman Heather Unruh, who alleged that Spacey sexually assaulted her son; filmmaker Tony Montana; actor Roberto Cavazos; Richard Dreyfuss' son Harry; and eight people who worked on House of Cards. The Guardian was contacted by "a number of people" who alleged that Spacey "groped and behaved in an inappropriate way with young men" as artistic director of The Old Vic theatre. In the wake of these claims, Netflix cut ties with Spacey, shelving his biopic of Gore Vidal and removing him from the last season of House of Cards. His completed role as J. Paul Getty in Ridley Scott's film All the Money in the World (2017) was reshot with Christopher Plummer.

In 2020, Spacey and the House of Cards production company Media Rights Capital engaged in a private eight-day arbitration over his alleged workplace misconduct and subsequent firing. The arbitrator issued a 46-page ruling in July 2020, and found that Spacey had repeatedly breached his acting and executive-producing contracts by engaging in sexual misconduct involving five crew members, including violating of MRC's anti-harassment policies. The arbitrator awarded MRC $31 million for losses stemming from Spacey's removal from the show. Spacey appealed the decision, but a panel of three retired judges upheld the arbitrators decision and a California Superior Court upheld the award in November 2021.

Spacey has also denied the other accusations. In 2022, he was found not liable of battery by a jury in Rapp's case in New York. In a separate criminal case in London, he was acquitted by a jury of sexual assault charges in 2023. Spacey was scheduled to face civil claims of sexual assault from three men at the High Court in London in October 2026. The claims were settled out of court.

Between 2018 and 2019, charges against him were dropped or not made, due to reasons such as death, refusal to testify, and statute of limitations.

== Events ==
On October 29, 2017, actor Anthony Rapp alleged that Spacey, while appearing intoxicated, made a sexual advance toward him at a party in 1986, when Rapp was 14 and Spacey was 27. Rapp had also shared this story in a 2001 interview with The Advocate, but Spacey's name was redacted from publication to avoid legal disputes and public outing. Spacey stated on Twitter that he did not remember the encounter, but that he owed Rapp "the sincerest apology for what would have been deeply inappropriate drunken behavior" if he had behaved as asserted. On September 9, 2020, Rapp sued Spacey for sexual assault, sexual battery, and intentional infliction of emotional distress under the Child Victims Act. In the subsequent federal civil court proceeding, a jury found that Spacey did not molest Rapp and was found not liable on all counts, with Rapp subsequently ordered by the court to pay Spacey $39,089 to compensate him for the costs of litigation.

Fifteen others then came forward alleging similar abuse, including Boston anchorwoman Heather Unruh, who alleged that Spacey sexually assaulted her son; filmmaker Tony Montana; actor Roberto Cavazos; Richard Dreyfuss' son Harry; and eight people who worked on House of Cards. The Guardian was contacted by "a number of people" who alleged that Spacey "groped and behaved in an inappropriate way with young men" as artistic director of The Old Vic theatre. In December 2017, Ari Behn, the former husband of Princess Märtha Louise of Norway, said that Spacey had groped his genitals in 2007, at a nightclub during the afterparty for the Nobel Peace Prize concert; however he said he didn't feel violated by the incident and that he "had a wonderful time" at the party; Behn said on the talkshow Skavlan: "I didn't experience it as sexual harassment [...] for me it was a compliment." Following his death American media portrayed him as a "Spacey accuser", although he had not accused Spacey of wrongdoing or been involved in any legal cases against Spacey, and conspiracy theories focusing on the incident circulated on the Internet; Norwegian commentators pointed out that Behn had regarded the incident as a minor, entertaining anecdote, and accused American media of fostering conspiracy theories by blowing the incident out of proportion.

=== Coming out controversy ===
On the same day as Rapp's allegations against him, Spacey came out as gay when apologizing to Rapp. He said, "I have had relationships with both men and women. I have loved and had romantic encounters with men throughout my life, and I choose now to live as a gay man." His decision to come out via his statement was criticized by gay celebrities, including Billy Eichner, George Takei, Lance Bass, and Wanda Sykes, as an attempt to change the subject and shift focus from Rapp's accusation, for using his own drunkenness as an excuse for an alleged sexual advance on a minor, and for implying a connection between homosexuality and child sexual abuse.

Some readers additionally felt that by claiming that he was "horrified" by Rapp's story, Spacey was attempting to paint himself as the victim of the alleged abuse. In October 2022, Spacey expressed regret over the way he came out and said that it was "never [his] intention" to deflect from the allegations against him or conflate them with his sexual orientation.

=== Reaction and ramifications ===
Amid the allegations, filming was suspended on the sixth and final season of House of Cards. The show's production company had implemented "an anonymous complaint hotline, crisis counselors, and sexual harassment legal advisors for the crew", and stated that in 2012, "someone on the crew shared a complaint about a specific remark and gesture made by Kevin Spacey. Immediate action was taken following our review of the situation and we are confident the issue was resolved promptly to the satisfaction of all involved." According to the production company, Spacey "willingly participated in a training process and since that time MRC has not been made aware of any other complaints" involving him. The show had been due to end in 2018. The season was shortened from 13 episodes to eight, and Spacey was removed from the cast and from his role as executive producer.

The Gore Vidal biographical film Gore, starring Spacey, which was set to be distributed by Netflix, was canceled, and Netflix went on to sever all ties with him. He was due to appear in All the Money in the World as industrialist J. Paul Getty; his scenes were cut, and Christopher Plummer replaced him as Getty in reshoots. In an interview with Variety, Plummer said: "It's really not replacing [Spacey]. It's starting all over again." Plummer added: "I think it's very sad what happened to him... Kevin is such a talented and a terrifically gifted actor, and it's so sad. It's such a shame. That's all I can say, because that's it."

The International Academy of Television Arts and Sciences reversed its decision to honor Spacey with the 2017 International Emmy Founders Award. On November 2, 2017, Variety reported that his publicist Staci Wolfe and talent agency Creative Artists Agency were ending their relationships with him.

=== Christmas Eve YouTube videos ===
External videos
- "Let Me Be Frank", in 2018
- "KTWK", in 2019
- "1-800 XMAS", in 2020
- "Being Frank With Tucker", in 2023

In 2018, 2019, 2020 and 2023, Spacey posted an annual video to his YouTube channel on Christmas Eve.

On December 24, 2018, Spacey uploaded a video titled "Let Me Be Frank", in which he – while in character as Frank Underwood – appeared to deny the real-life allegations leveled against him. The video was described by Slate writer Daniel Politi as "bizarre" and "stomach-churning", while drawing derision from actresses such as Ellen Barkin, Patricia Arquette, and Alyssa Milano, the latter of whom called it "creepy". As of December 2022, the video has over 13 million views.

On December 24, 2019, Spacey posted another video, titled "KTWK" (short for "kill them with kindness"), to his YouTube channel, once again in character as Underwood.

In 2020, Spacey posted a third Christmas Eve video, titled "1-800 XMAS", in which he spoke in Underwood's accent before breaking character and speaking in his natural voice. He then expressed sympathy for people struggling amid the COVID-19 pandemic and promoted two suicide and substance abuse hotlines. The annual videos have been described as "tone-deaf" by Eric Hegedus in The New York Post with respect to the allegations against him.

On December 24, 2023, Spacey posted a video where he stayed in character as Underwood, conversing with right-wing political commentator Tucker Carlson. The two discussed Netflix and the upcoming 2024 presidential election.

=== Legal issues ===
The Los Angeles District Attorney's office stated, in April 2018, that it would investigate an allegation that Spacey had sexually assaulted an adult male in 1992. In July 2018, three more allegations of sexual assault against Spacey were revealed by Scotland Yard, bringing the total number of open investigations in the UK to six. In September 2018, a lawsuit filed at Los Angeles Superior Court claimed that Spacey sexually assaulted an unnamed masseur in October 2016 at a house in Malibu, California.

In December 2018, Spacey was charged with a felony for allegedly sexually assaulting journalist Heather Unruh's 18-year-old son in Nantucket, Massachusetts, in July 2016. Spacey pleaded not guilty to the charge on January 7, 2019. Unruh's son told police that he was texting with his girlfriend throughout the alleged "groping" incident. Spacey's defense attorneys spent months trying to obtain copies of the texts and the phone itself. In mid-May 2019, Unruh's son's personal attorney informed the court that the phone in question was "missing". On June 4, 2019, the defense learned that, when Unruh gave the police her son's phone in 2017, she admitted that she had deleted some of the text messages. Later that month, her son filed a lawsuit against Spacey, claiming emotional damages. Shortly later, on July 5, 2019, they withdrew the lawsuit.

On July 17, 2019, the criminal assault charge against Spacey was dropped by the Cape and Islands prosecutors. When the anonymous massage therapist who accused him died, the last remaining criminal case against Spacey was closed.

On September 9, 2020, Anthony Rapp accused Spacey in a complaint about actions that allegedly happened in 1986 (sexual assault and sexual battery) and intentional infliction of emotional distress under the Child Victims Act, which extended New York's statute of limitations for suits related to child sexual abuse. Joining Rapp in the suit against Spacey was a man who requested to remain anonymous who accused Spacey of sexually abusing him in 1983, when he was 14 and Spacey was 24. On June 17, 2021, the anonymous accuser was dismissed from the case due to his refusal to publicly identify himself. As Rapp's trial lawsuit against Spacey commenced in October 2022, it was revealed Rapp had given an inaccurate description of the apartment where he alleged the abuse took place. On October 17, the judge dismissed the emotional-distress charges as a "duplicate" of the battery charges. On October 20, a jury found Spacey not liable of all charges, with the court further ordering Rapp to pay Spacey $39,089 to cover the costs of litigation.

In 2020, Spacey and his production companies M. Profitt Productions and Trigger Street Productions were ordered to pay $31 million to MRC, the studio that produced House of Cards, for violating its sexual harassment policy. Spacey appealed to have the arbitration award overturned, but the request was denied on August 4, 2022.

On May 26, 2022, Spacey was charged by the Crown Prosecution Service (CPS) in the United Kingdom with four counts of sexual assault against three complainants. The alleged offenses occurred between 2005 and 2013 in London and Gloucestershire. According to the Crown Prosecution Service, it would be possible to formally charge Spacey only if he entered England or Wales either voluntarily or through an extradition request. Nevertheless, in a statement to Good Morning America on May 31, 2022, Spacey said he would "voluntarily appear in the U.K. as soon as can be arranged".

In his first British court appearance, on June 16, Spacey denied the allegations against him. On July 14, he pleaded not guilty to the charges in London. On November 16, the CPS authorized an additional seven charges against Spacey, all related to a single complainant arising from incidents alleged to have occurred between 2001 and 2004. Three charges were dismissed before or during the trial, which began on June 28, 2023, and, on July 26, 2023, a jury found Spacey not guilty of the remaining nine charges.

=== Jeffrey Epstein association ===
Spacey was pictured with Ghislaine Maxwell in 2002 in the throne room at Buckingham Palace after they were allegedly invited there by Andrew Mountbatten-Windsor. He claimed he had not met her or Jeffrey Epstein before they flew to London with US President Bill Clinton on Epstein's private jet, the Lolita Express, after a humanitarian event in Africa with young women. This flight had greatly increased the media attention of Epstein, who prior to this was little-known. Spacey denied having a friendship with Epstein or Maxwell or even meeting with either of them after the "eight day African humanitarian trip".

In July 2025, Spacey called for the Epstein files to be made public, saying "Release the Epstein files. All of them. For those of us with nothing to fear, the truth can't come soon enough." In December that year, The Guardian stated that there was no information to suggest that Spacey was involved with, or even aware of, Epstein's crimes.
