= Alex Spanos =

American billionaire real estate developer and founder of the A.G. Spanos Companies

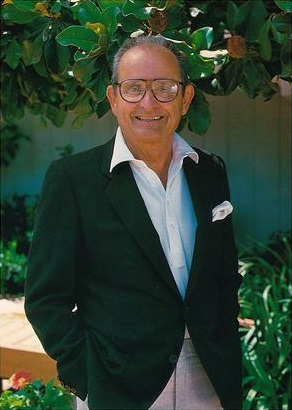
- Spanos, c. 1985
- Born: Alexander Gus Spanos; September 28, 1923; Stockton, California, U.S.
- Died: October 9, 2018 (aged 95); Stockton, California, U.S.
- Education: University of the Pacific
- Occupations: Majority shareholder, San Diego / Los Angeles Chargers; Founder, A. G. Spanos Companies
- Spouse: Faye Papafaklis (m. 1948; died 2018)
- Children: 4, including Dean Spanos

Alexander Gus Spanos (September 28, 1923 – October 9, 2018) was an American billionaire real estate developer, founder of the A. G. Spanos Companies, and the majority owner of the San Diego / Los Angeles Chargers of the National Football League (NFL).

== Early life and education ==
Spanos was born in Stockton, California, to Greek immigrants Constantino and Evanthia Spanos. His father owned a bakery where the young Spanos started working at the age of eight. According to his autobiography, Spanos was "born into conflict", since his parents were constantly fighting. Spanos' mother even left the family home for two years and attempted to take two children with her, but his parents reunited when he was a teenager and remained married until his death. Spanos, who played a large part in mediating the conflict between his parents, stated that his turbulent home life was the reason he strove to provide a stable environment for his own children. In 1942, he dropped out of college at the California Polytechnic School and joined the Army Air Force training as a pilot but left the program and instead served as a tail gunner during World War II. Spanos earned varsity letters in swimming and diving at the University of the Pacific in Stockton and later distinguished himself as an amateur golfer.

== Career ==
In 1951, he borrowed $800 ($9,375 in 2024) from a local banker to buy a truck which he then used to sell sandwiches to migrant farm workers in the San Joaquin Valley. He invested his earnings in real estate and at the suggestion of his tax accountants, started to build apartments. In 1960, he founded A. G. Spanos Companies, which by 1977 had become the largest apartment builder in the United States. The corporation is based in Stockton and has 10 subsidiaries.

In 1984, Spanos bought 60% of the San Diego Chargers (now Los Angeles Chargers) from majority owner Eugene Klein for $48.3 million. Over the next 10 years, he bought out the shares of several small co-owners, bringing his control of the team to 97%. The remaining 3% was held by San Diego restaurateur George Pernicano, an investor in the team since a few years after its inception, until Pernicano's death in October 2016; and Bill Fox, a local community leader, until his death in 2020. Since 1993, Spanos' son Dean has handled the daily operations of the franchise. According to Forbes, as of August 2022, the Los Angeles Chargers are worth $3.875 billion.

== Philanthropy and political contributions ==
Alex G. Spanos Stadium at Lincoln High School

Spanos donated $500,000 to renovate the Fox Theatre in downtown Stockton, and with the approval of the City of Stockton, renamed the facility the Fox California Bob Hope Theatre. The Alex G. Spanos Center at University of the Pacific in Stockton, the Alex G. Spanos Stadium for Lincoln High School in Stockton, the Alex G. Spanos Sports and Recreation Complex in Sacramento, the Alex G. Spanos Training Center at UCSD are named after him. From 2006 to 2022, the Mustang Memorial Field at Cal Poly also bore his name, after he donated $8 million to renovate the stadium.

Spanos was one of the largest contributors to George W. Bush's re-election campaign in 2004. By contributing $5 million to 527 groups that supported the Bush campaign in 2004, Spanos ranked among the top five GOP donors. President Bush appointed Spanos to the Kennedy Center board in 2004. Spanos was inducted into the California Building Industry Hall of Fame in 2005. Spanos also received the AHEPA Award, an award that recognizes members of the community for their contributions and achievements in their chosen field of endeavor.

== Personal life ==
In 1948, Spanos married Faye Papafaklis. They had four children: Dean Spanos, the Chargers' team president; Michael Spanos, the Chargers' executive vice president; Alexis Spanos Ruhl, a vice president of A. G. Spanos Companies; and Dea Spanos Berberian, a vice president of A. G. Spanos Companies. In his autobiography, Spanos credited his wife with much of his success and stated that the couple did not recall "one real argument." Faye Spanos died on August 7, 2018, aged 92.

Spanos resided in Stockton, California. He also owned property in Las Vegas, Nevada. Spanos had a seven-way heart bypass in 2000, and had surgery and chemotherapy for colon cancer. After his heart bypass at Sacramento Mercy General Hospital, Spanos donated $15 million to the hospital to sponsor the construction of a new state-of-the-art heart center.

Spanos wrote a book called Sharing the Wealth: My Story, which detailed his rise from a moneyless man of 27 years to become a billionaire. Spanos was the first person to be on the winning teams in both the Bob Hope Desert Classic in Palm Desert (1977) and the Bob Hope British Pro-Am (1980).

Spanos died October 9, 2018, age 95, of complications from dementia that had been diagnosed ten years prior. According to friends, he had been brokenhearted by the death of his wife two months earlier.

== See also ==
- List of celebrities who own wineries and vineyards

Sporting positions
Preceded by Gene Klein	San Diego/Los Angeles Chargers owner 1984–2018	Succeeded by Dean Spanos
