= Lincoln Unified School District =

School district in California

Address
- 2010 West Swain Road Stockton, California, 95207; United States

District information
- Type: Public
- Grades: K–12
- NCES District ID: 0621690

Students and staff
- Students: 8,939 (2020–2021)
- Teachers: 409.32 (FTE)
- Staff: 381.63 (FTE)
- Student–teacher ratio: 21.84:1

Other information
- Website: www.lusd.net

Lincoln Unified School District is located in Stockton, California, United States, and serves more than 9,200 students at 13 "learning centers" throughout the northwestern region of the city.

== School Board ==
Starting with the 2014 elections, there are five trustee voting areas. Trustees serve four-year terms with a two-term limit (effective November 2000).

The Board typically meets the second and fourth Wednesdays of the month. Most regular meetings begin with a closed session of the Board directly following Call to Order. The Board resumes open session at 7:30 p.m. unless otherwise posted. Additional meetings may be called as necessary.

== Schools ==
The school district encompasses 13 "learning centers", the first of which, named Lincoln Elementary, a one-room country school, opened on the corner of an empty field five miles north of Stockton in 1878 and still exists today, although it has undergone a complete renovation.

The district serves more than 9,200 students with one comprehensive high school, one alternative high school, an independent learning center (grades 9-12), one middle school (7-8), two elementary schools serving grades K-6, one charter school specializing in Science, Technology, Engineering and Math, serving grades TK-8, and six elementary schools serving grades K-8.

=== High schools ===
- Lincoln High School (9-12)
- Village Oaks High School (9-12)

=== Middle schools ===
- Sierra Middle School (7-8)

=== Elementary schools ===
==== K-8 schools ====
- Brookside
- Claudia Landeen
- Colonial Heights
- Mable Barron
- Don Riggio
- Tully C. Knoles

==== K-6 schools ====
- John R. Williams
- Lincoln Elementary

==== Charter Schools ====
- John McCandless Charter School

=== Other Facilities ===
- Independent Learning Center (9-12)
