= Louis Rankin =

American football player (born 1985)

No. 40, 30
- Position: Running back

Personal information
- Born: May 4, 1985 (age 41); Stockton, California, U.S.
- Listed height: 6 ft 1 in (1.85 m)
- Listed weight: 205 lb (93 kg)

Career information
- High school: Lincoln (Stockton)
- College: Washington
- NFL draft: 2008: undrafted

Career history
- Oakland Raiders (2008–2009); Seattle Seahawks (2009); Oakland Raiders (2011)*; Saskatchewan Roughriders (2012)
- * Offseason or practice squad member only

Awards and highlights
- Second-team All-Pac-10 (2007); Washington Offensive MVP (2007)

Career NFL statistics
- Rushing yards: 36
- Rushing average: 4.5
- Rushing TDs: 0
- Stats at Pro Football Reference

Louis Rankin (born May 4, 1985) is an American former professional football player who was a running back in the National Football League (NFL) and Canadian Football League (CFL). He was signed by the Oakland Raiders as an undrafted free agent in 2008. He played college football for the Washington Huskies.

== Early life ==
Rankin played football, basketball, and track for the Lincoln High School Trojans of Stockton, California. As a senior, Rankin rushed for 2,245 yards and 41 touchdowns, setting the school record. His success won him first-team all-state selection by CalHi Sports.

== College career ==
Rankin signed with the Washington Huskies in February 2003 and after redshirting during the 2003 season, he played in eight games as a redshirt freshman in 2004, totaling 35 yards on nine carries.

Over the next three seasons, Rankin would carry the ball 479 times for 2,445 and 11 touchdowns including 1,294 yards and six touchdowns as a senior in 2007. His senior season was the first time in 10 years that a Washington tailback was able to break 1,000 yards.

Rankin still ranks 10th all-time in Washington program history with 2,480 yards rushing.

== Professional career ==
=== Oakland Raiders ===
During the 2008 preseason Rankin rushed for 148 yards on 21 carries (a 7.0 average), including a 72-yard run in the Raider's preseason opener against the San Francisco 49ers. He was released by Oakland during final cuts on August 30, but re-signed to the team's practice squad the following day. He was then promoted to the Raider's active roster on December 13, 2008.

Rankin was released by the Raiders on September 25, 2009.

=== Seattle Seahawks ===
Rankin was signed to the Seattle Seahawks practice squad on September 30, 2009. He was activated on October 28.

=== Oakland Raiders ===
On January 6, 2011, Rankin signed a future deal with the Oakland Raiders. He was waived by the Oakland Raiders during final roster cuts on September 3, 2011.

=== Saskatchewan Roughriders ===
On February 10, 2012, it was announced that Rankin had signed with the Saskatchewan Roughriders of the Canadian Football League.

== Personal ==
His uncle is former NFL wide receiver Webster Slaughter, who played for five different teams from 1986-1998.

== See also ==
- Washington Huskies football statistical leaders
