= Shima Tract =

Island in California

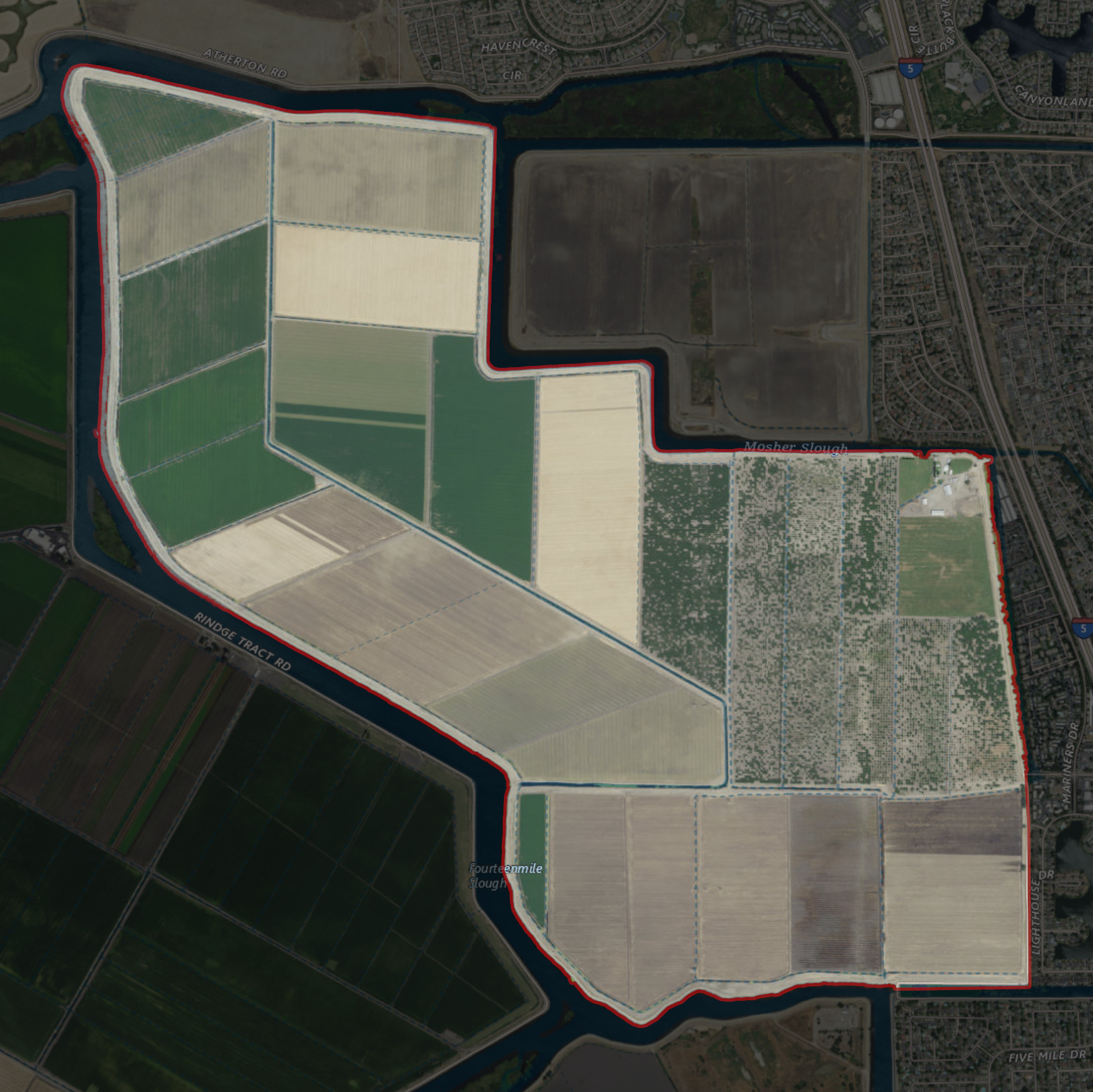
- USGS aerial imagery of the Shima Tract

- Location within Sacramento-San Joaquin River Delta Location within California Location within the United States

Geography
- Location: Northern California
- Coordinates: 38°01′40″N 121°23′06″W
- Adjacent to: Sacramento–San Joaquin River Delta
- Highest elevation: 0 ft (0 m)

Administration
- United States
- State: California
- County: San Joaquin

The Shima Tract is an island in the Sacramento–San Joaquin River Delta. It is part of San Joaquin County, California, and managed by Reclamation District 2115. Its coordinates are 38°01′40″N 121°23′06″W, and the United States Geological Survey measured its elevation as 0 ft (0 m) in 1981. It appears on a 1952 USGS map of the area.

The Shima Tract was owned by (and takes its name from) George Shima, a businessman and farmer who at one point produced 85% of California's potato crop.
