= A. G. Spanos Companies =

Construction corporation

A.G. Spanos Companies is a builder of multifamily residences, commercial buildings and communities. It is considered to be one of the biggest apartment developers in the United States.

A.G. Spanos Companies was founded by billionaire Alex Spanos. Upon the suggestion of his advisors, Spanos shifted from food catering to the construction of apartment buildings in 1960. By 1977, the company became the largest apartment builder in the United States. The conglomerate, which is owned by the Spanos family following the death of its founder in 2018, remains as one of the most successful apartment development companies in the US. It has constructed about 200,000 multifamily units across the country, which included more than 22,000 units it developed in Las Vegas beginning in the 1970s.
