= Lincoln High School (Stockton, California) =

Location
- 6844 Alexandria Place; Stockton, California 95207; United States; 38.01121°N 121.33746°W

Information
- Motto: "Amity and Peace from Knowledge"
- Established: 1954
- School district: Lincoln Unified School District
- Principal: Kat Bender
- Teaching staff: 130.89 (FTE)
- Grades: 9-12
- Enrollment: 2,891 (2023-2024)
- Student to teacher ratio: 22.09
- Campus: Urban
- Colors: Red, white, gray, and black
- Nickname: Trojans
- Newspaper: The Lincolnian
- Yearbook: The Log
- Website: www.lincolnhigh.org

Lincoln High School, founded in 1954, is Lincoln Unified School District's only comprehensive high school. The school serves approximately 3,500 students from ethnically and socio-economically diverse populations.

== Facilities ==
Alex G. Spanos Stadium

Facilities include: Alex G. Spanos Stadium, a one-story armory that Lincoln High completed construction of in 2008, Ruhl Family Clubhouse, and the Richard De Long Aquatic Complex.

== Academics ==
Each student is required to take some basic courses including but not limited to the following:

- 4 years of English
- 2 years of Mathematics
- 2 years of Physical Education
- 2 years of Science (one life science course and one physical science course)
- 4 years of Social Science (including World Geography/Health, World History, US History, and American Government/Economics)
- 2 years of Career/Technical Education, Visual/Performing Art, or World Language

and 8 additional elective courses.

Most academic courses are college prep, honors, or Advanced Placement (AP). AP courses offered include: English Language & Composition, English Literature & Composition, Calculus AB, Calculus BC, Statistics, Biology, Chemistry, Human Geography, World History, US History, United States Government & Politics, Spanish Language & Culture, Studio Art, Music Theory, Computer Science A, and Computer Science Principles.

UC/CSU-approved Honors Courses include: Introduction to Analysis, Spanish 3, Chemistry, Physics, and Wind Ensemble.

== History ==
Lincoln High School began on the campus of the College of the Pacific in 1954 and then moved in 1958 to 1956 Stanton Way under then superintendent Mable Barron. In 1964 the current campus at 6844 Alexandria Place was completed and has been home to the school ever since.

== Extracurriculars ==
The school has over 90+ organizations, teams and clubs. These clubs have focuses on academics, culture, recreational, and student interest.

=== Visual and Performing Arts ===
Lincoln High School has a Visual & Performing Arts Department. Students with interests in the arts are offered courses in music (band, choir, orchestra, piano, guitar, electronic music and music theory), performing arts (acting, stagecraft, production, oral interpretation, and speech and debate) and visual arts (traditional and computer art, photography and ceramics).

=== Student Publications ===
The student body news, Trojan News, is published online monthly by Student Government

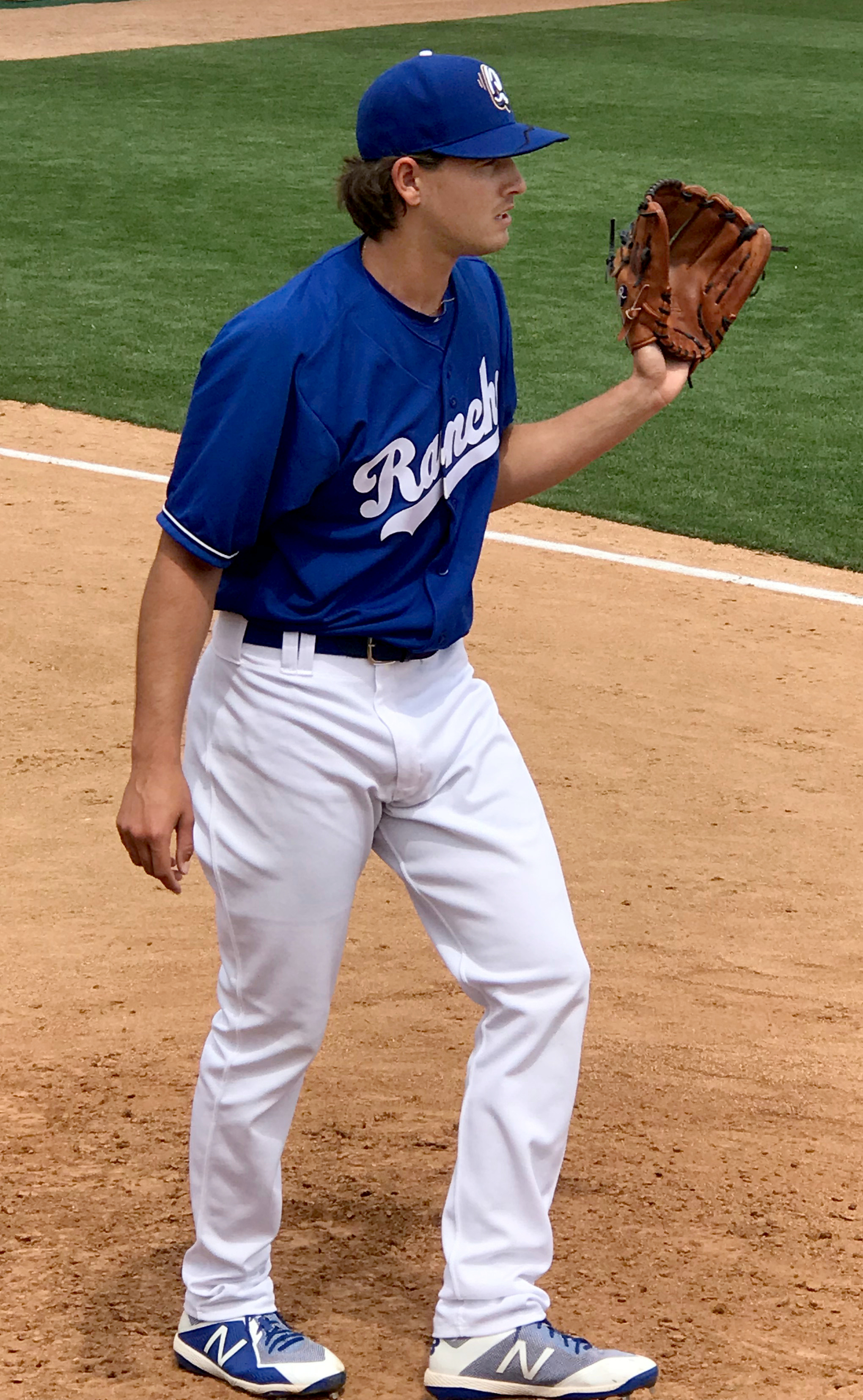
Dean Kremer

== Notable alumni ==
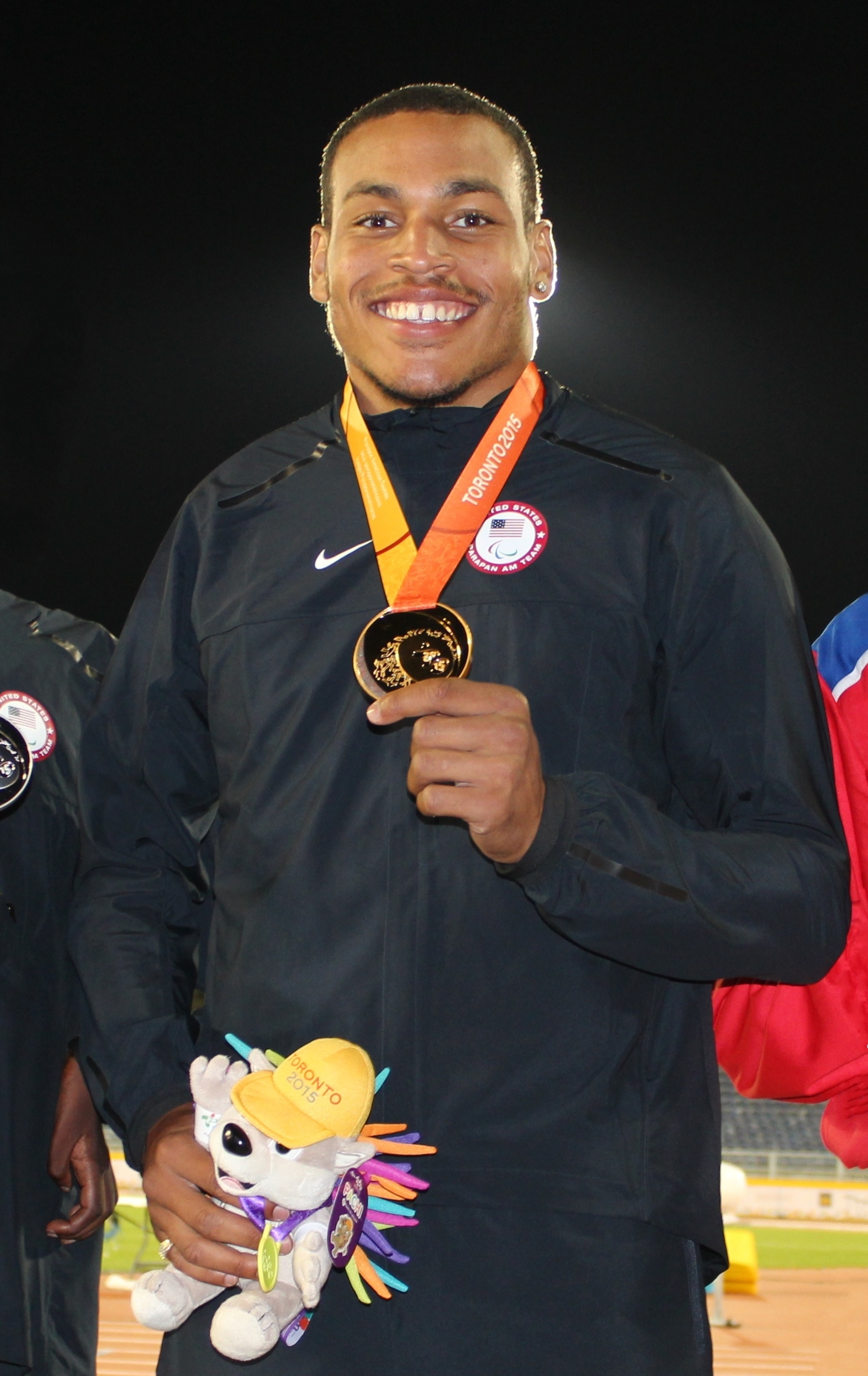
Roderick Townsend-Roberts

- Ricky Barnes, 1999, professional golfer (US Amateur champion 2002)
- Mike Bruner, 1974, Olympic gold medal swimmer
- Miles Byrd, 2022, basketball player
- Shante Carver, 1989, National Football League (NFL) player (Dallas Cowboys)
- Rachelle B. Chong, former member of the Federal Communications Commission (FCC)
- Brandin Cooks, wide receiver for the Dallas Cowboys.
- Justin Davis, 2013, professional football player (Los Angeles Rams)
- Ed Fisher, 1969, NFL player (Houston Oilers)
- Mark Gantt, 1986, actor and producer
- Dirk Hamilton, 1967, folk musician
- Bob Heinz, 1964, NFL player (Miami Dolphins)
- Dean Kremer, 2013, Israeli-American major league baseball starting pitcher (Baltimore Orioles)
- Tommy McClendon, 1972, lead guitarist of rock band UFO from 1984-1988
- Mike Macfarlane, 1982, Major League Baseball player (Kansas City Royals, Boston Red Sox & Oakland Athletics)
- Adam Melhuse, 1990, Major League Baseball player (Colorado Rockies, Oakland Athletics, Chicago Cubs)-GM Chicago Cubs organization
- Louis Rankin, 2003, professional football player (Oakland Raiders & Seattle Seahawks)
- Bill Sandeman, 1961, NFL player (Atlanta Falcons)
- Kristin Smart, 1995, missing person
- Dean Spanos, 1968, President/CEO of the Los Angeles Chargers
- Brett Sullivan, Major League Baseball player (San Diego Padres)
- Roderick Townsend-Roberts, 2010, paralympic professional track and field athlete, 2015 US national team, 3 time USA champion
- Heather Unruh, 1985, journalist and former television news anchor at WCVB (Boston, MA)
- Anthony Veasna So, 2010, author
- Jonah Coleman, 2026, NFL Running back (Denver Broncos)
