= Heather Unruh =

American journalist

- Born: June 28, 1967 (age 58); San Jose, California, U.S.
- Occupations: Retired Journalist and Copper Sculpture Artist
- Known for: Former anchor for News Center 5 in WCVB
- Spouse(s): Harold R. Beacham, Jr.
- Children: 2

Heather Unruh (born June 28, 1967) is an American journalist and former television news anchor. She worked for News Center 5 at WCVB for more than fifteen years.

Unruh is also known for her involvement in deleting content from her son's phone following his criminal allegation of groping actor Kevin Spacey in the Massachusetts trial which took place on the island of Nantucket.

== Education ==
Unruh is a 1985 graduate of Lincoln High School in Stockton, California and a 1989 graduate of DePauw University.

== Career ==
Unruh went to WCVB in June 2001 after working at KFOR in Oklahoma City where she was early evening anchor and medical reporter. She has also worked at WVTM-TV in Birmingham, Alabama; both WBNG-TV and WMGC-TV in Binghamton, New York; and WVEU-TV in Atlanta.

Unruh received four regional Emmy Awards for journalism, the Clarion Award from Women in Communications, Inc., and the Gracie Allen Award from the American Women in Radio and Television. Her last airdate was on October 14, 2016, and as of 2017 she has become a Fine Artist and active member of the Artists Association of Nantucket.

== Activism ==
Unruh is an advocate for lung cancer awareness and has received multiple awards from the American Cancer Society and Uniting Against Lung Cancer.

Unruh is an advocate of preserving a clean, healthy ocean and supports efforts to protect whales and other sea creatures in their ocean environment

In 2013, Unruh helped to establish Stand With Everyone Against Rape (SWEAR), a non-profit organization promoting speaking out against rape.
