= Eagle's Landing Christian Academy =

Private Christian school in McDonough, Georgia, United States

Location
- 2400 Hwy 42 North; McDonough, Georgia 30253; United States; 33°30′21″N 84°11′03″W

Information
- Type: Private, Christian, coeducational
- Motto: "Empowering Students to Impact the World since 1970"
- Religious affiliation: Christian
- Denomination: Southern Baptist Convention
- Established: 1970
- President: Trea Brinson
- Principal: Jay Covington, HS Principal; Cathie Kelly, MS Principal; Michelle Blackburn, Elementary Principal
- Head of school: Dr. Keith Curlee
- Faculty: 150
- Enrollment: 930
- Average class size: 17
- Hours in school day: 7
- Campus: Suburban
- Colors: Blue, gold, and white
- Mascot: Chargers
- Accreditations: Cognia, GAC, Association of Christian Schools Intl, CESA candidate
- Website: Eagle's Landing Christian Academy

Eagle's Landing Christian Academy (ELCA) is a private Christian school is located on an 86-acre campus twenty-five miles south of Atlanta in McDonough, Georgia, United States. It ranks 14th in the Atlanta Business Chronicle of Atlanta's 75 largest private schools. It is a ministry of Eagle's Landing First Baptist Church. Eagle's Landing Christian Academy is accredited by AdvancED and the Georgia Accrediting Commission (GAC). In addition, Eagle's Landing Christian Academy is a member of the Georgia High School Association (GHSA), Region 5-AA, Southern Baptist Association of Christian Schools, Association of Christian Schools International, Atlanta Christian Schools Association, The College Board, and the Georgia Independent School Association.

== History ==
Eagle's Landing Christian Academy was founded as McDonough Christian Academy in 1970. The school had its first graduating class in 1973, with nine students. It was renamed Meadow Creek Christian Academy before becoming Greater Atlanta Christian School – Meadow Creek Campus. In 1994, Eagle's Landing First Baptist Church assumed control of the school, naming it Eagle's Landing Christian Academy.

=== Eagle's Landing Christian Academy ===
In 1994, the academy became a ministry of Eagle's Landing First Baptist Church. In 2000, the school and church moved to the current location. In 2006, the school and church went through a multimillion-dollar building project, adding a new gym, church offices, and cafeteria. As a part of the new cafeteria, the school began using the SAGE lunch program.

== Academics ==
=== High school ===
Eagle's Landing Christian Academy offers over 40 honors and Advanced Placement classes.

=== Middle school ===
The middle school offers seven honors courses.

=== Student council ===
Each high school grade selects class officers for each school year. The positions include president, vice president, secretary, and chaplain.

== Extra-curricular activities ==
=== Athletics ===
The athletic program includes 12 varsity sports as well as JV, MS, and youth levels in a variety of sports. ELCA participates in the Georgia High School Association (Region 5 Class AA) and competes at a high level year after year.

==== State championships ====
ELCA has had 41 State Final Four appearances, 24 State Runner-Up appearances, 18 State Championships & 30 Individual State Champions.

In 2018, the varsity softball team became the 1st team in GHSA history to win 7 State Championships.

In 2019, the varsity football team, became the 1st team in GHSA history to win 5 State Championships in a row. The Chargers have won 6 State Championships since 2012.

- Baseball: 2005 (Final 4), 2007 (State Runner-Up), 2006, 2013 (State Champs)
- Basketball: 2016 (Girls Final 4), 2018 (Boys Final 4), 2019 (State Runner-Up)
- Football: 2011, 2013, 2021 (Final 4), 2014 (State Runner-Up), 2012, 2015, 2016, 2017, 2018, 2019 (State Champs)
- Golf: 2006, 2015 (Boys Final 4)
- Softball: 2006, 2007, 2008, 2009, 2013, 2014, 2015 (State Champs), 2017 (Final 4), 2021 (Final 4)
- Track and field: 2017 (Girls Final 4), 2009, 2016, 2018 (Boys Final 4), 2015, 2016 (Girls State Runner-Up), 2010 (Boys State Runner-Up), 2014 (Girls State Champs), 2017 (Boys State Champs)
- Volleyball: 2011 (State Champs), 2013, 2014 (Final 4), 2021 (Final 4)

=== Fine Arts ===
Eagles Landing Christian Academy has a fine arts program including Art, Band (Marching, Praise, Symphonic), Chorus, Drama and Guitar.

Drama team won regions in 2012 with their show A Few Good Men.

Eagles Landing Christian Academy has performed shows including Pocahontas, The Sound of Music, The Wizard of Oz, Annie, Seven Brides for Seven Brothers, and the 2015 spring musical Oliver.

In conjunction with Eagle's Landing First Baptist Church, ELCA has performed Christmastime productions of MTI's (Music Theater International) musicals A Christmas Carol (2017 & 2018) and Annie (2019) with local actor and school Drama Instructor and Head of Fine Arts, Chuck Ekstedt, directing. Academy students, parents, and church members collaborated in all cast and crew roles.

== Notable alumni ==
- Daz Cameron, MLB professional baseball outfielder
- Jacob Heyward, professional baseball outfielder and coach
- Colton Hood, NFL cornerback for the New York Giants
- Keaton Mitchell, NFL running back
- Isaac Rochell, NFL defensive end
