= Colton Hood =

American football player (born 2005)

No. 12 – New York Giants
- Position: Cornerback
- Roster status: Active

Personal information
- Born: February 23, 2005 (age 21)
- Listed height: 6 ft 0 in (1.83 m)
- Listed weight: 193 lb (88 kg)

Career information
- High school: Eagle's Landing Christian Academy (McDonough, Georgia)
- College: Auburn (2023); Colorado (2024); Tennessee (2025)
- NFL draft: 2026: 2nd round, 37th overall pick

Career history
- New York Giants (2026–present)

Awards and highlights
- Second-team All-SEC (2025)

Career NFL statistics as of Week 10, 2026
- Tackles: 10
- Stats at Pro Football Reference

Colton Hood (born February 23, 2005) is an American professional football cornerback for the New York Giants of the National Football League (NFL). He previously played college football for the Auburn Tigers, Colorado Buffaloes, and Tennessee Volunteers. Hood was selected by the Giants in the second round of the 2026 NFL draft.

== Early life ==
Hood attended Eagle's Landing Christian Academy in McDonough, Georgia. He played cornerback, wide receiver, quarterback, and running back in high school. As a senior, he recorded 40 tackles and three interceptions on defense and had 1,112 yards of total offense with 13 touchdowns. Hood originally committed to play college football at Michigan State University before flipping his commitment to Auburn University.

== College career ==
Hood played one year at Auburn, appearing in four games and took a redshirt. He transferred to the University of Colorado Boulder for the 2024 season. In one season at Colorado, he played in all 13 games with one start and had 24 tackles and two interceptions. After the season, he transferred to the University of Tennessee. In his first game at Tennessee he had four tackles, three pass breakups, and returned a fumble 22 yards for a touchdown against Syracuse.

== Professional career ==
Pre-draft measurables
Height	Weight	Arm length	Hand span	Wingspan	40-yard dash	10-yard split	20-yard split	Vertical jump	Broad jump
5 ft 11 5/8 in (1.82 m)	193 lb (88 kg)	31 3/8 in (0.80 m)	9 in (0.23 m)	6 ft 2 7/8 in (1.90 m)	4.44 s	1.58 s	2.58 s	40.5 in (1.03 m)	10 ft 5 in (3.18 m)
All values from NFL Combine

Hood was drafted by the New York Giants on the second round (37th overall) of the 2026 NFL draft.

== Personal life ==
Hood's uncle Roderick played parts of eight seasons in the NFL as a cornerback from 2003 to 2011.
