= New York Giants =

NFL team in East Rutherford, New Jersey

- Current season
Logo	Wordmark
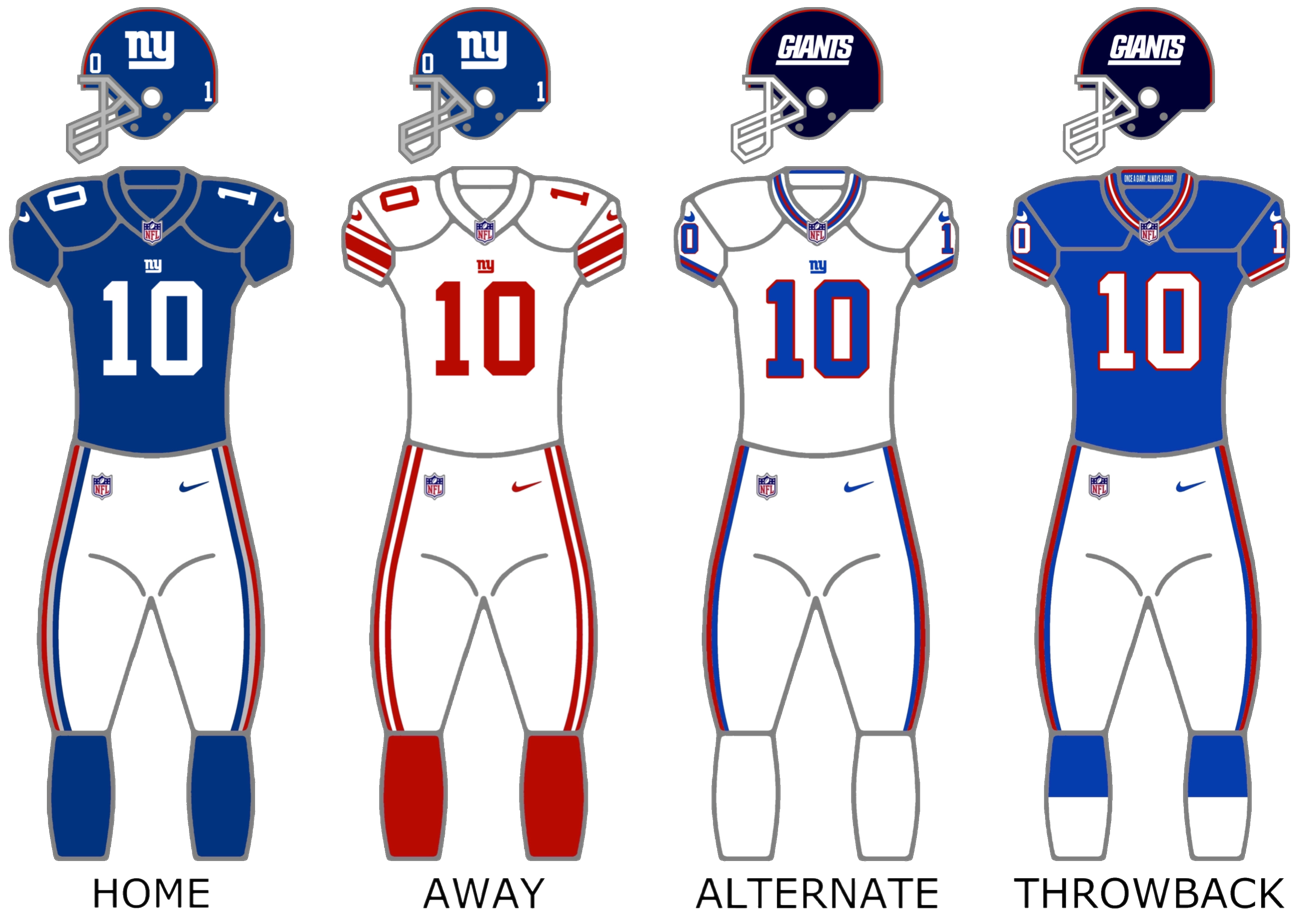
- Uniforms

General information
- Founded: August 1, 1925; 101 years ago
- Stadium: MetLife Stadium; East Rutherford, New Jersey
- Headquartered: Quest Diagnostics Training Center, East Rutherford, New Jersey
- Colors: Dark blue, red, white
- Website: giants.com

Personnel
- Owners: John Mara; Steve Tisch
- CEO: Steve Tisch
- General manager: Joe Schoen
- Head coach: John Harbaugh
- President: John Mara

Nicknames
- Big Blue; G-Men; New York Football Giants; Big Blue Wrecking Crew (linebackers, 1984–1993)

Team history
- New York Giants (1925–present)

Home fields
- Polo Grounds (1925–1955); Yankee Stadium (1956–1973); Yale Bowl (1973–1974); Shea Stadium (1975); Giants Stadium (1976–2009); MetLife Stadium (2010–present)

League / conference affiliations
- National Football League (1925–present): Eastern Division (1933–1949); American Conference (1950–1952); Eastern Conference (1953–1969); Century Division (1967; 1969); Capitol Division (1968); National Football Conference (1970–present); NFC East (1970–present)

Championships
- League championships: 8: NFL championships (pre-1970 AFL–NFL merger) (4) 1927, 1934, 1938, 1956; Super Bowl championships: 4 1986 (XXI), 1990 (XXV), 2007 (XLII), 2011 (XLVI)
- Conference championships: 11: NFL Eastern: 1956, 1958, 1959, 1961, 1962, 1963; NFC: 1986, 1990, 2000, 2007, 2011
- Division championships: 16: NFL Eastern: 1933, 1934, 1935, 1938, 1939, 1941, 1944, 1946; NFC East: 1986, 1989, 1990, 1997, 2000, 2005, 2008, 2011

Playoff appearances (33)
- NFL: 1933, 1934, 1935, 1938, 1939, 1941, 1943, 1944, 1946, 1950, 1956, 1958, 1959, 1961, 1962, 1963, 1981, 1984, 1985, 1986, 1989, 1990, 1993, 1997, 2000, 2002, 2005, 2006, 2007, 2008, 2011, 2016, 2022

Owners
- Tim Mara (1925–1959); Jack Mara & Wellington Mara (1959–1965); Wellington Mara & Timothy J. Mara (1965–1991); Wellington Mara & Preston Robert Tisch (1991–2005); John Mara & Steve Tisch (2005–present)

The New York Giants are a professional American football team based in the New York metropolitan area. The Giants compete in the National Football League (NFL) as a member of the National Football Conference (NFC) East division. The team plays its home games at MetLife Stadium (which it shares with the New York Jets) at the Meadowlands Sports Complex in East Rutherford, New Jersey, five miles (eight kilometers) west of New York City. The Giants are headquartered and practice at the Quest Diagnostics Training Center, also in the Meadowlands.

The Giants were one of five teams that joined the NFL in 1925, and they are the only one of that group still existing, as well as the league's longest-established team in the Northeastern United States. The team ranks third among all NFL franchises with eight NFL championship titles: four in the pre-Super Bowl era (1927, 1934, 1938, 1956) and four since the advent of the Super Bowl (XXI [1986], XXV [1990], XLII [2007], and XLVI [2011]), along with more championship appearances than any other team, with 19 overall appearances. Their championship tally is surpassed only by the Green Bay Packers (13) and the Chicago Bears (9). Throughout their history, the Giants have featured 29 Hall of Fame players, including NFL Most Valuable Player (MVP) award winners Mel Hein, Frank Gifford, Y. A. Tittle, and Lawrence Taylor.

To distinguish themselves from the professional baseball team of the same name, the football team was incorporated as the "New York National League Football Company, Inc." in 1929 and then changed to "New York Football Giants, Inc." in 1937. While the baseball team moved to San Francisco after the 1957 season, the football team continues to legally use it as its corporate name, which the team is often referred to by fans and sportscasters alike. The team has also acquired several nicknames, including "Big Blue", the "G-Men", and the "Jints", an intentionally mangled contraction seen frequently in the New York Post and New York Daily News, originating from the baseball team when they were based in New York. In addition, the team as a whole is occasionally referred to as the "Big Blue Wrecking Crew", even though this moniker primarily and originally refers to the Giants defensive unit during the 1980s and early-1990s.

Since 2011, the team has struggled to find success in recent years, only having three winning seasons in 2012, 2016, and 2022, as well as two playoff appearances and no division titles. As of 2025, the Giants currently hold the longest active division title drought in the NFC, with a total of 14 seasons.

The team's heated rivalry with the Philadelphia Eagles is the oldest of the NFC East rivalries, dating back to 1933, and has been called the best rivalry in the NFL in the 21st century.

== History ==
=== Mara family era (1925–1990) ===
On August 1, 1925, Timothy Mara and Will Gibson were granted a franchise by the NFL for their newly organized team in New York City — the New York Football Giants. The cost of the franchise was $2,500.

The Giants played their first game as an exhibition against All New Britain (which was not an NFL team) in New Britain, Connecticut, on October 4. They defeated New Britain 26–0 in front of a crowd of 10,000.

The New York Giants' first NFL game was a week later, on October 11, 1925, at the Cycledrome in Providence, Rhode Island, in a 0 to 14 loss to the Providence Steam Roller. The Giants were successful in their first season, finishing in fourth place in a 20-team league with an 8–4–0 record.

==== Earl Potteiger years (1927–1928) ====
===== NFL champions (1927) =====
In its third season, the team finished with the best record in the league at 11–1–1 and was awarded the NFL title. After a disappointing fourth season (1928) owner Tim Mara bought the entire squad of the Detroit Wolverines, principally to acquire star quarterback Benny Friedman, and merged the two teams under the Giants name.

In 1930, there were still many who questioned the quality of the professional game, claiming the college "amateurs" played with more intensity than professionals. In December 1930, the Giants played a team of Notre Dame All Stars at the Polo Grounds to raise money for the unemployed of New York City. It was also an opportunity to establish the skill and prestige of the pro game. Knute Rockne reassembled his Four Horsemen along with the stars of his 1924 Championship squad and told them to score early, then defend. Rockne, like much of the public, thought little of pro football and expected an easy win. But from the beginning it was a one-way contest, with Friedman running for two Giant touchdowns and Hap Moran passing for another. Notre Dame failed to score. When it was all over, Coach Rockne told his team, "That was the greatest football machine I ever saw. I am glad none of you got hurt." The game raised $100,000 for the homeless, and is often credited with establishing the legitimacy of the professional game for those who were critical. It also was the last game the legendary Rockne ever coached; he was killed in an airplane crash on March 31, 1931.

==== Steve Owen years (1931–1953) ====
In a 16-year span from 1931 to 1947, the Giants qualified to play in the NFL championship game 8 times, winning twice. During this period the Giants were led by Hall of Fame coach Steve Owen, and Hall of Fame players Mel Hein, Red Badgro, and Tuffy Leemans. In 1933 the Giants faced the Chicago Bears in the championship game and were defeated 23–21.

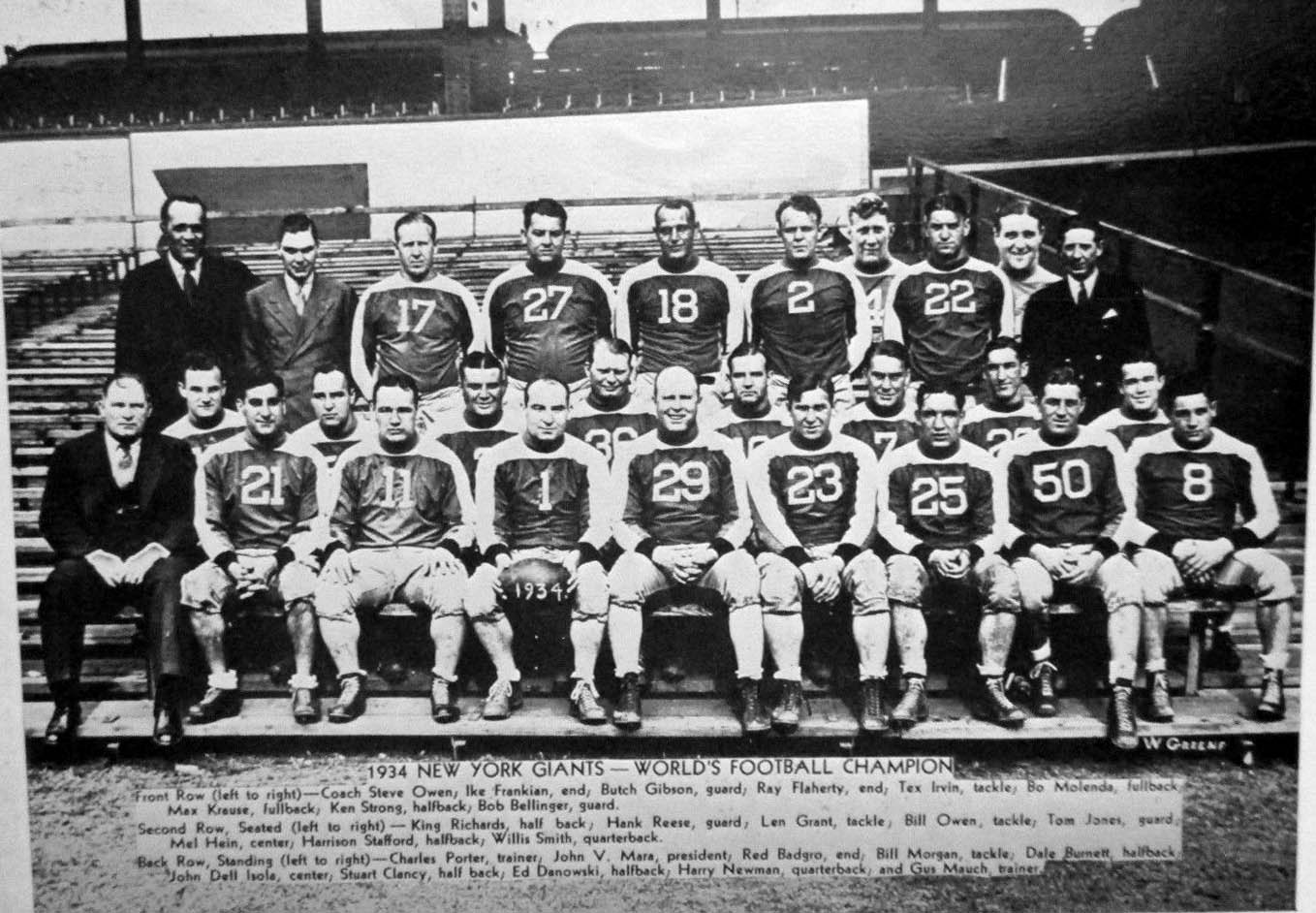
1934 New York Giants team

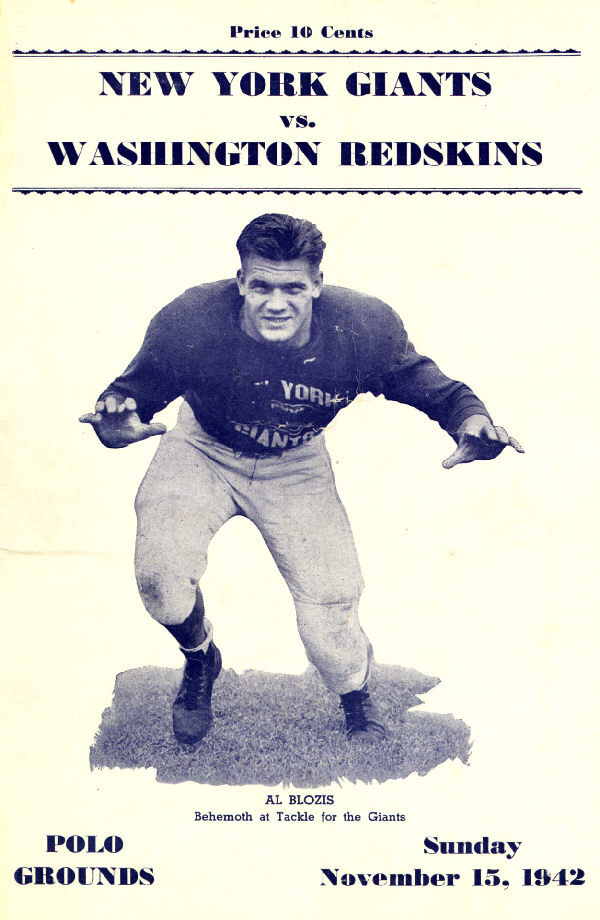
Al Blozis, Giants tackle, died in World War II. According to Mel Hein, "If he hadn't been killed, he could have been the greatest tackle who ever played football."

===== NFL champions (1934) =====
The famous "Sneakers Game" was played in this era where the Giants defeated the Chicago Bears on an icy field in the 1934 NFL Championship Game, while wearing sneakers for better traction. The team would return to the championship game the following year but would fall to the Detroit Lions 26–7.

===== NFL champions (1938) =====
The Giants captured their third NFL championship in 1938 with a 23–17 win over the Green Bay Packers. Both teams returned to the championship game the following year in 1939, with the Packers shutting out the Giants 27–0.

The period also featured the 1944 Giants, which are ranked as the #1 defensive team in NFL history, "...a truly awesome unit". They gave up only 7.5 points per game (a record that still stands) and shut out five of their 10 opponents, though they lost 14–7 to the Green Bay Packers in the 1944 NFL Championship Game. The Giants played the Detroit Lions to a scoreless tie on November 7, 1943. To this day, no NFL game played since then has ended in a scoreless tie. The Giants were particularly successful from the latter half of the 1930s until the United States entry into World War II.

==== Jim Lee Howell years (1954–1960) ====
===== NFL champions (1956) =====
The Giants won their next championship in 1956, the first year the team began playing at Yankee Stadium in the Bronx borough of New York City. Aided by a number of future Pro Football Hall of Fame players such as running back Frank Gifford, linebacker Sam Huff, and offensive tackle Roosevelt Brown, as well as all-pro running back Alex Webster. The Giants' 1956 championship team not only included players who would eventually find their way to the Pro Football Hall of Fame, but a Hall of Fame coaching staff, as well. Head coach Jim Lee Howell's staff had Vince Lombardi coaching the offense and Tom Landry coaching the defense. From 1958 to 1963, the Giants played in the NFL Championship Game five times, but failed to win. Most significantly, the Giants played the Colts in the 1958 NFL Championship Game, which is considered a watershed event in the history of the NFL. The game, which the Giants lost in overtime 23–17, is often called "The Greatest Game Ever Played" and is considered one of the most important events in furthering the NFL's popularity. The following year, they lost the championship to the Colts again, giving up a 9–7 fourth-quarter lead en route to a 31–16 loss.

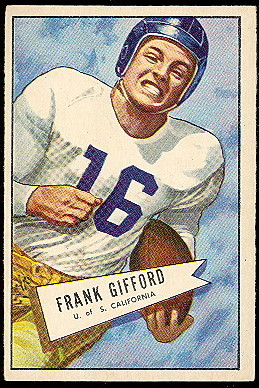
Frank Gifford, Giants halfback and wide receiver from 1952 to 1960 and again from 1962 to 1964, was inducted into the Pro Football Hall of Fame in 1977

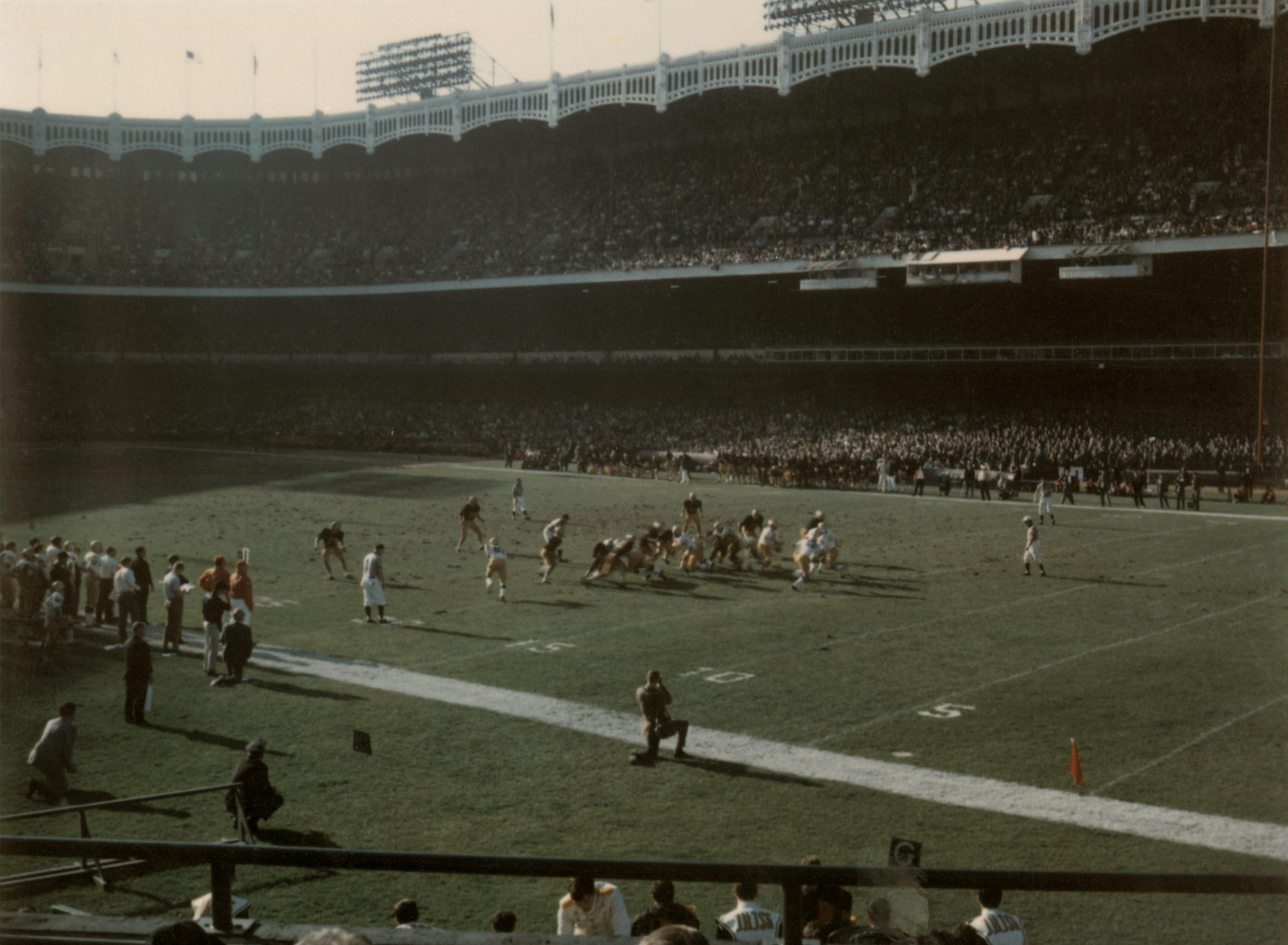
The Giants played at Yankee Stadium (1956–1973) in the Bronx

==== Allie Sherman years (1961–1968) ====
Both the 1961 and 1962 championship game matched the Giants up against the Green Bay Packers, with the Giants losing both 37–0 and 16–7 respectively. In 1963, led by league MVP quarterback Y. A. Tittle, who threw a then-NFL record 36 touchdown passes, the Giants advanced to the NFL Championship Game, where they lost to the Bears 14–10 for their third consecutive championship loss, as well as their fifth loss in the title game in 6 years.

With players such as Tittle and Gifford approaching their mid 30s, the team declined rapidly, finishing 2–10–2 in 1964. It was the start of a 15-year stretch with only two winning seasons and no playoff appearances. They rebounded with a 7–7 record in 1965, before crumbling to a league-worst 1–12–1 record, and allowing more than 500 points on defense in 1966. During the 1969 preseason, the Giants lost their first meeting with the New York Jets, 37–14, in front of 70,874 fans at the Yale Bowl in New Haven, Connecticut. Following the game, Wellington Mara fired coach Allie Sherman, and replaced him with former Giants fullback Alex Webster.

1975 helmet logo / mainlogo (stylized with "neon" style uppercase "NY")

In 1967, the team acquired quarterback Fran Tarkenton from the Minnesota Vikings. Despite having several respectable seasons with Tarkenton at quarterback, including a 7–7 finish in 1967 and 9–5 in 1970, the Giants traded him back to the Vikings after a 4–10 finish in 1971. Tarkenton would go on to lead the Vikings to three Super Bowls and earn a place in the Hall of Fame, while the Giants suffered through one of the worst stretches in their history, winning only 23 games from 1973 to 1979. Before the 1976 season, the Giants tried to revive a weak offense by replacing retired RB Ron Johnson with future Hall of Fame fullback Larry Csonka, but Csonka was often injured and ineffective during his 3 years in New York. The 1977 season featured a roster which included three rookie quarterbacks.

The Giants were allowed to play their home games at the Yale Bowl in New Haven, Connecticut in 1973 and 1974, and at Shea Stadium (home of the Mets and Jets) in Queens, New York in 1975, due to the renovation of Yankee Stadium. They finally moved into their own dedicated state-of-the-art stadium in 1976, when they moved into Giants Stadium at the Meadowlands in East Rutherford, New Jersey, located 5 miles (8.0 km) west of New York City. One of the low points during this period was the play known as the "Miracle at the Meadowlands", which occurred in 1978. With the Giants trying to kill the clock and secure a win against the Philadelphia Eagles, offensive coordinator, Bob Gibson, chose to call a running play. This resulted in "The Fumble" by QB Joe Pisarcik that was returned for a game-winning touchdown by the Eagles' Herman Edwards.

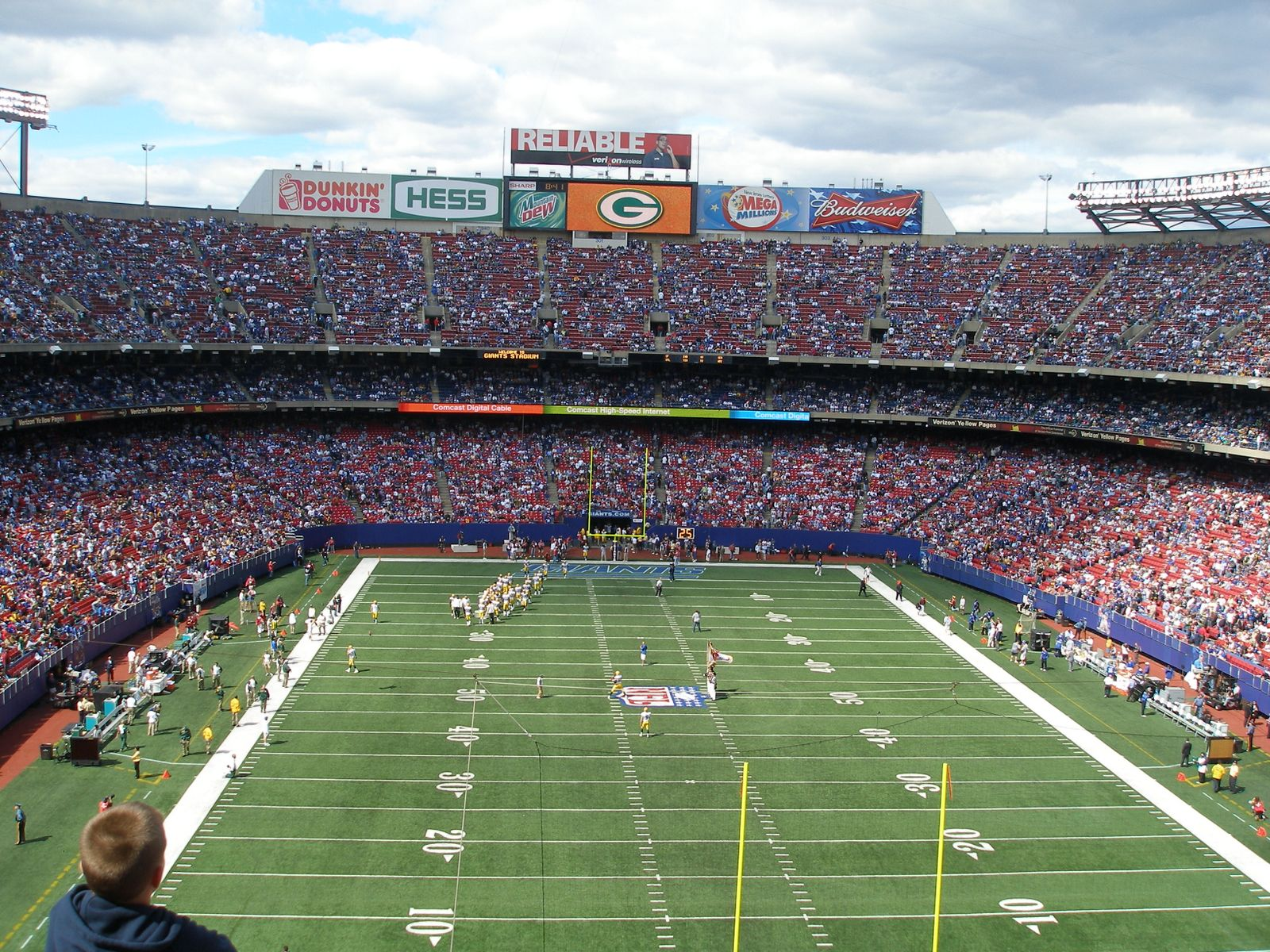
Giants Stadium was home to the Giants from 1976 to 2009.

The Giants' front office operations were complicated by a long-standing feud between Wellington Mara and his nephew, Tim Mara. Jack Mara had died in 1965, leaving his share of the club to his son Tim. Wellington and Tim's personal styles and their visions for the club clashed, and eventually they stopped talking to each other. NFL Commissioner Pete Rozelle intervened and recommended a neutral general manager, George Young, allowing the club to operate more smoothly. The feud became moot on February 20, 1991, when Tim Mara sold his shares in the club to Preston Robert Tisch.

In 1979, the Giants began the steps that would, in time, return them to the pinnacle of the NFL. These included the drafting of quarterback Phil Simms in 1979, and linebacker Lawrence Taylor in 1981. In 1981, Taylor won the NFL's Defensive Rookie of the Year and Defensive Player of the Year awards and the Giants made the playoffs for the first time since 1963. The linebackers of the team became known as the Crunch Bunch during this season. After the strike-shortened 1982 season, in which they finished 4–5, head coach Ray Perkins resigned to succeed the legendary Bear Bryant as head coach at the University of Alabama. In a change that would prove crucial in the coming years, he was replaced by the team's defensive coordinator, Bill Parcells.

==== Bill Parcells years (1983–1990) ====
In 1983, Bill Parcells was promoted to head coach from defensive coordinator. One of his first moves was to change his starting quarterback, sitting the injury-prone and struggling Phil Simms (who had missed the entire 1982 season with an injury) and electing instead to go with Scott Brunner, who had gone 4–5 as the starter in place of Simms in the strike-shortened previous season. Parcells went as far as to demote Simms to the third-string position, promoting Jeff Rutledge over Simms to be Brunner's backup. Parcells later said the move was a mistake and one he "nearly paid for dearly" as the team finished with a 3–12–1 record and his job security was called into question.

In the off-season the Giants released Brunner and named Simms the starter. The move paid off as the team won nine games and returned to the playoffs. After beating the Los Angeles Rams in the wild-card round, the Giants prepared for a showdown against the top-seeded San Francisco 49ers. The 49ers defeated the Giants 21–10 in the divisional round.

===== Super Bowl XXI champions (1986) =====
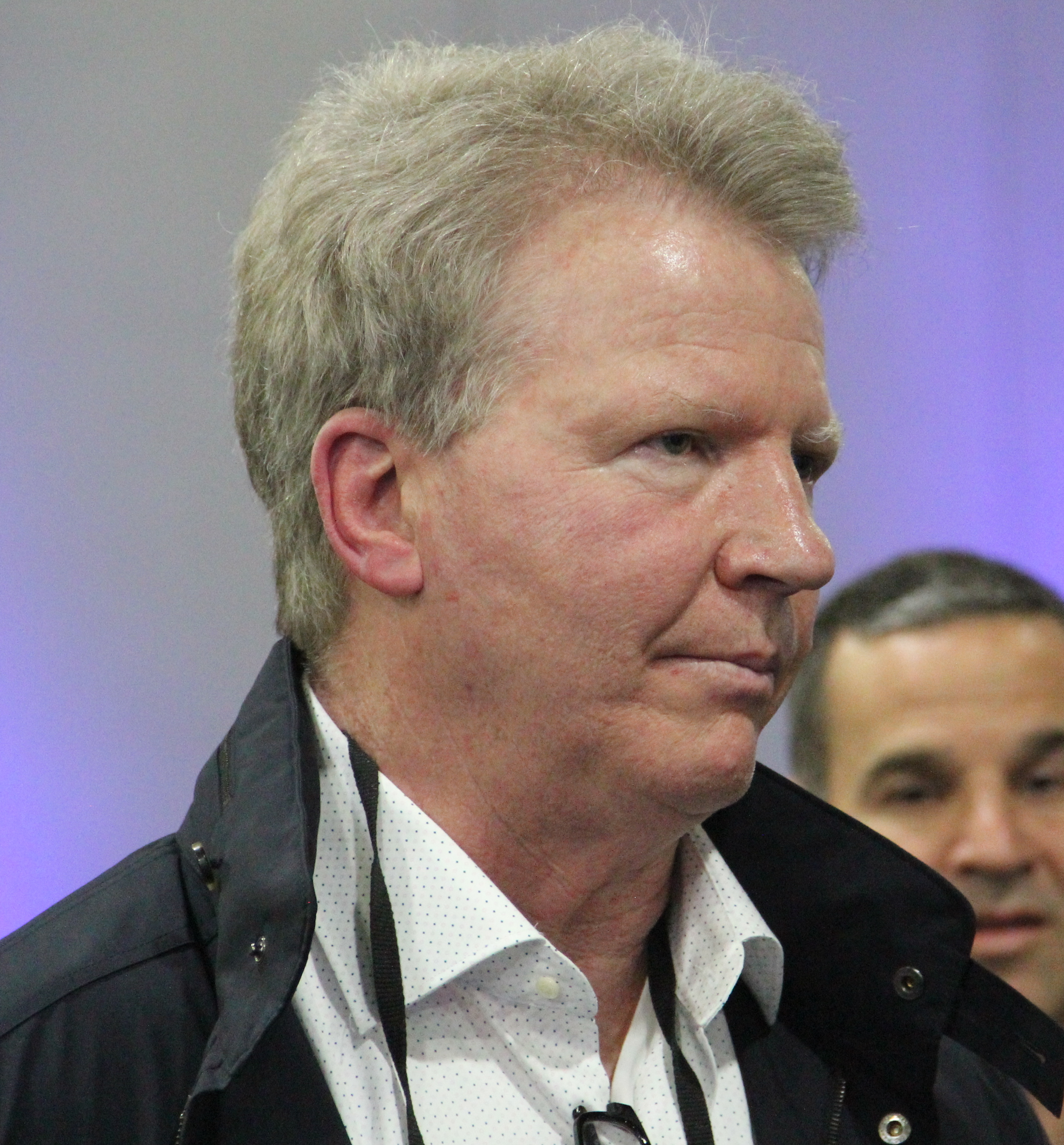
Phil Simms, Giants quarterback from 1979 to 1993, was named Super Bowl XXI most valuable player

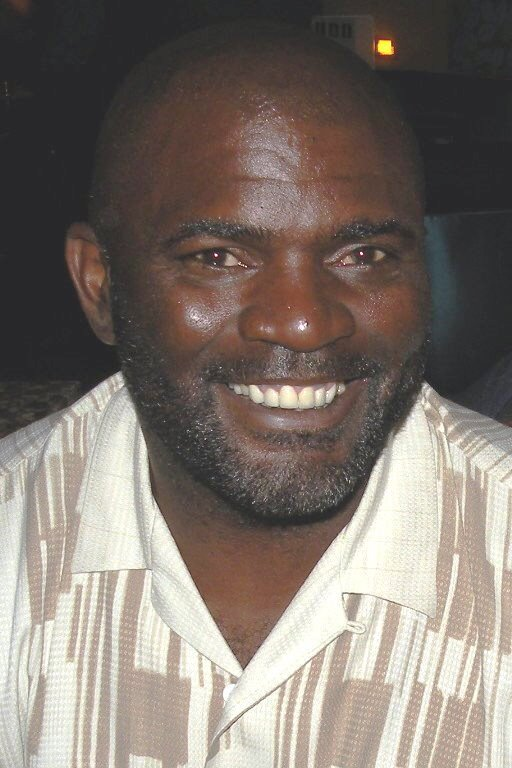
Lawrence Taylor, Giants linebacker from 1981 to 1993, was inducted into the Pro Football Hall of Fame in 1999

After 9–7 and 10–6 finishes in 1984 and 1985 respectively, the Giants compiled a 14–2 record in 1986 led by league MVP and Defensive Player of the Year Lawrence Taylor and the Big Blue Wrecking Crew defense. As of 2023, this is the Giants' best regular season record since the NFL began playing 16-game seasons in 1978. After clinching the top seed in the NFC, the Giants defeated the 49ers 49–3 in the divisional round of the NFC playoffs and the Redskins 17–0 in the NFC championship game, advancing to their first Super Bowl, Super Bowl XXI, against the Denver Broncos at the Rose Bowl in Pasadena. Led by MVP Simms who completed 22 of 25 passes for a Super Bowl record 88% completion percentage, they defeated the Broncos 39–20, to win their first championship since 1956. In addition to Phil Simms and Lawrence Taylor, the team was led during this period by head coach Bill Parcells, tight end Mark Bavaro, running back Joe Morris, and Hall of Fame linebacker Harry Carson.

The Giants struggled to a 6–9 record in the strike-marred 1987 season, due largely to a decline in the running game, as Morris managed only 658 yards (601.68 m) behind an injury-riddled offensive line. The early portion of the 1988 season was marred by a scandal involving Lawrence Taylor. Taylor had abused cocaine and was suspended for the first four games of the season for his second violation of the league's substance-abuse policy. Despite the controversy, the Giants finished 10–6, and Taylor recorded 15.5 sacks after his return from the suspension; however, the team missed the playoffs in their last game of the season. They surged to a 12–4 record in 1989, but lost to the Los Angeles Rams in their opening playoff game when Flipper Anderson caught a 47-yard touchdown pass to give the Rams a 19–13 overtime win.

===== Super Bowl XXV champions (1990) =====
In 1990, the Giants went 13–3 and, at the time, set an NFL record for fewest turnovers in a season (14). They defeated the San Francisco 49ers, who were attempting to win the Super Bowl for an unprecedented third straight year, 15–13 at San Francisco and then defeated the Buffalo Bills 20–19 in Super Bowl XXV.

=== Mara and Tisch era (1991–present) ===
Following the 1990 season, Parcells resigned as head coach and was replaced by the team's offensive-line coach Ray Handley. Handley served as coach for two disappointing seasons (1991 and 1992), which saw the Giants fall from Super Bowl champions to an 8–8 record in 1991 and a 6–10 record in 1992. He was fired following the 1992 season, and replaced by former Denver Broncos' coach Dan Reeves. In the early 1990s, Simms and Taylor, two of the stars of the 1980s, played out the last seasons of their careers with steadily declining production. The Giants experienced a resurgent season with Reeves at the helm in 1993 however, and Simms and Taylor ended their careers as members of a playoff team.

The Giants initially struggled in the post Simms/Taylor era. After starting 3–7 in 1994, the Giants won their final six games to finish 9–7 but missed the playoffs. Quarterback Dave Brown received heavy criticism throughout the season. Brown performed poorly the following two seasons, and the Giants struggled to 5–11 and 6–10 records. Reeves was fired following the 1996 season.

==== Jim Fassel years (1997–2003) ====
In 1997, the Giants named Jim Fassel, who had spent the previous season as offensive coordinator of the Arizona Cardinals, as their 16th head coach. Fassel named Danny Kanell the team's starting quarterback. The Giants finished the 1997 season with a record of 10–5–1 and qualified for the playoffs for the first time in four years. However, they lost in the wild-card round to the Vikings at home. The following year, the Giants began the season 4–8 before rallying to finish the season 8–8. One of the notable games of that season was a win over the eventual Super Bowl champion Denver Broncos in week 15, giving the Broncos their first loss of the season after starting 13–0.

Before the 1999 season, the Giants signed ex-Carolina Panthers quarterback Kerry Collins. Collins was the first-ever draft choice of the expansion Carolina Panthers in 1995 and led the Panthers to the NFC Championship game in his second season. However, problems with alcohol, conflicts with his teammates, and questions about his character led to his release from the Panthers. The Giants finished the season with a 7–9 record, Fassel's first losing season as head coach.

In 2000, the Giants were looking to make the playoffs for the first time in three seasons. The Giants started the season 7–2, but suffered back-to-back home losses to St. Louis and Detroit to make their record 7–4 and call their playoff prospects into question. At a press conference following the Giants' loss to Detroit, Fassel guaranteed that "this team is going to the playoffs". The Giants responded, winning the rest of their regular season games to finish the season 12–4 and clinch the top seed in the NFC. In the divisional round, the Giants beat the Philadelphia Eagles 20–10 at home to qualify for the NFC Championship Game, in which they defeated the Minnesota Vikings 41–0. They advanced to play the Baltimore Ravens in Super Bowl XXXV. Though the Giants went into halftime down only 10–0, the Ravens dominated the second half. Their defense harassed Kerry Collins all game long, resulting in Collins completing only 15 of 39 passes for 112 yards and 4 interceptions. The Ravens won the game 34–7.

After a disappointing 7–9 record in 2001, the Giants finished the 2002 season with a record of 10–6, qualifying for the playoffs as a wild card. This set up a meeting with the San Francisco 49ers in Candlestick Park in the wild-card round. The Giants built up a sizable lead throughout the game and led 38–14 with 4:27 left in the third quarter. However, San Francisco rallied to win the game by one point, with the final score of 39–38.

After a dismal 2003 season in which the Giants finished with a 4–12 record, Jim Fassel was released by the Giants. His head coaching record with the Giants during this time was 58–53–1.

==== Tom Coughlin years (2004–2015) ====
In 2004, three years after their last Super Bowl appearance, Fassel was replaced by Tom Coughlin. Although Collins had several solid seasons as the Giants quarterback, he experienced his share of struggles. Also in 2004, the Giants completed a draft day trade for University of Mississippi quarterback Eli Manning. Manning became the team's starting quarterback in the middle of the 2004 season, taking over for Kurt Warner. During the three-year period from 2004 to 2006, Tom Coughlin's Giants compiled a 25–23 regular season record and two appearances in the wild-card round — both losses (to the Carolina Panthers in 2005 and to the Philadelphia Eagles in 2006.) and spawned intense media scrutiny concerning the direction of the team. During this period in their history, standout players included defensive end Michael Strahan, who set the NFL single season record in sacks in 2001, and running back Tiki Barber, who set a team record for rushing yards in a season in 2005. Barber retired at the end of the 2006 season.

===== Super Bowl XLII champions (2007) =====
Going into 2007, the Giants had made the playoffs in back-to-back seasons. In 2007, the Giants became the third NFL franchise to win at least 600 games when they defeated the Atlanta Falcons 31–10 on Monday Night Football. For the 2007 season, the NFL scheduled the Giants' road game against the Miami Dolphins on October 28 in London's Wembley Stadium; this was the first NFL regular season game to be played outside of North America. The Giants defeated the Dolphins, 13–10. The Giants finished 10–6 and became NFC Champions after defeating the Tampa Bay Buccaneers, Dallas Cowboys, and Green Bay Packers in the NFC Playoffs. They set a record for most consecutive road wins in a single season with 10 (a streak which ended with a loss to the Cleveland Browns during week 6 of the 2008 season).

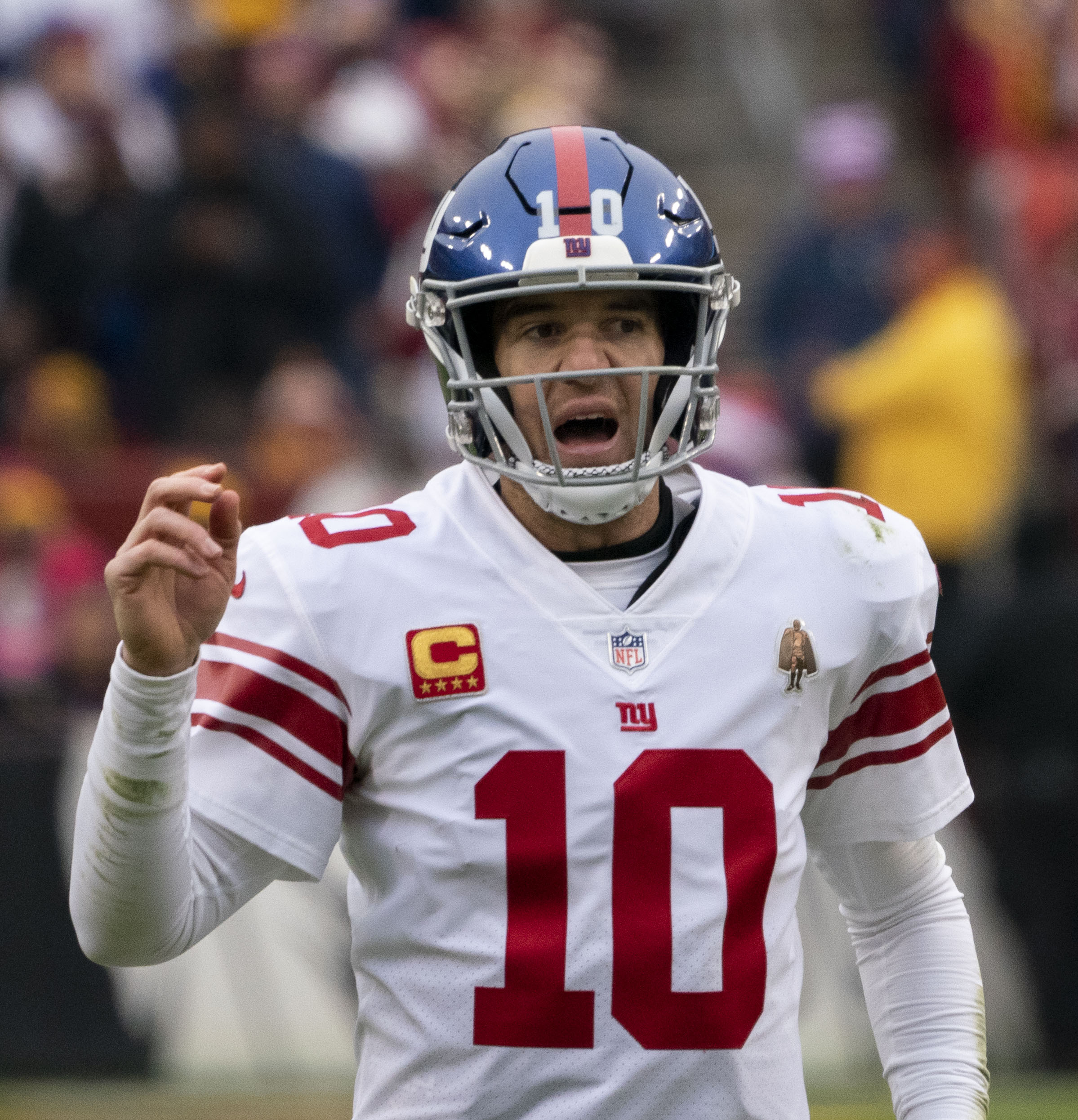
Eli Manning, Giants quarterback from 2004 to 2019, was named most valuable player for Super Bowls XLII and XLVI

The Patriots (18–0) entered the Super Bowl undefeated and were 12-point favorites going into game weekend. The Giants defeated the Patriots 17–14 in Super Bowl XLII, aided by the famous "Manning to Tyree" pass. On this famous play, Manning escaped the grip of several Patriots defensive linemen, stepped up in the pocket, and heaved the ball down the middle of the field to a double-covered David Tyree. With Rodney Harrison, a Patriots defensive back, all over Tyree, David managed to hold on to the ball by holding it on his helmet until he fell to the ground. This catch set up a Manning to Plaxico Burress touchdown pass in the back of the end zone to put the Giants in the lead. It was the third biggest upset by betting line in Super Bowl history (the Baltimore Colts were favored by 19.5-point over the New York Jets in Super Bowl III, and the St. Louis Rams were favored by 14 over the New England Patriots in Super Bowl XXXVI). Co-owner John Mara described it as "the greatest victory in the history of this franchise, without question".

The Giants began the 2008 season with a record of 11–1 but lost three of their last four regular season games partially due to a self-inflicted gunshot wound to wide receiver Plaxico Burress. However, the Giants still won the NFC East with a record of 12–4, and clinched the number one seed in the NFC after beating the Carolina Panthers for home-field advantage and a first-round bye. In the divisional round of the playoffs, the Giants lost 23–11 to the Philadelphia Eagles at home.

In 2009, the Giants opened a new training complex, the Timex Performance Center, also located in the Meadowlands. After starting 5–0 in the 2009 season, New York lost to the likewise undefeated New Orleans Saints at the Louisiana Superdome 48–27, beginning a four-game losing streak, in which they lost to the Arizona Cardinals 24–17, the San Diego Chargers 21–20 and the Philadelphia Eagles 40–17. The streak was broken with a 34–31 overtime victory against the Atlanta Falcons. On Thanksgiving night, they lost to the Denver Broncos 26–6. The Giants next beat the division-leading Dallas Cowboys. A week later, with a record of 7–5, they lost to the Philadelphia Eagles, 45–38. On December 27, the Giants lost to the Carolina Panthers 41–9 in their final game at Giants Stadium and were eliminated from playoff eligibility. The Giants finished the season 8–8.

Following the season, the Giants fired first-year defensive coordinator Bill Sheridan, and replaced him with the former Buffalo Bills interim head coach, Perry Fewell. The Giants defense finished 13th overall under Sheridan, giving up 324.9 yards (297.09 m) per game, and the final two losses of the season against Carolina and Minnesota, in which the Giants gave up 85 points, ultimately led to the firing.

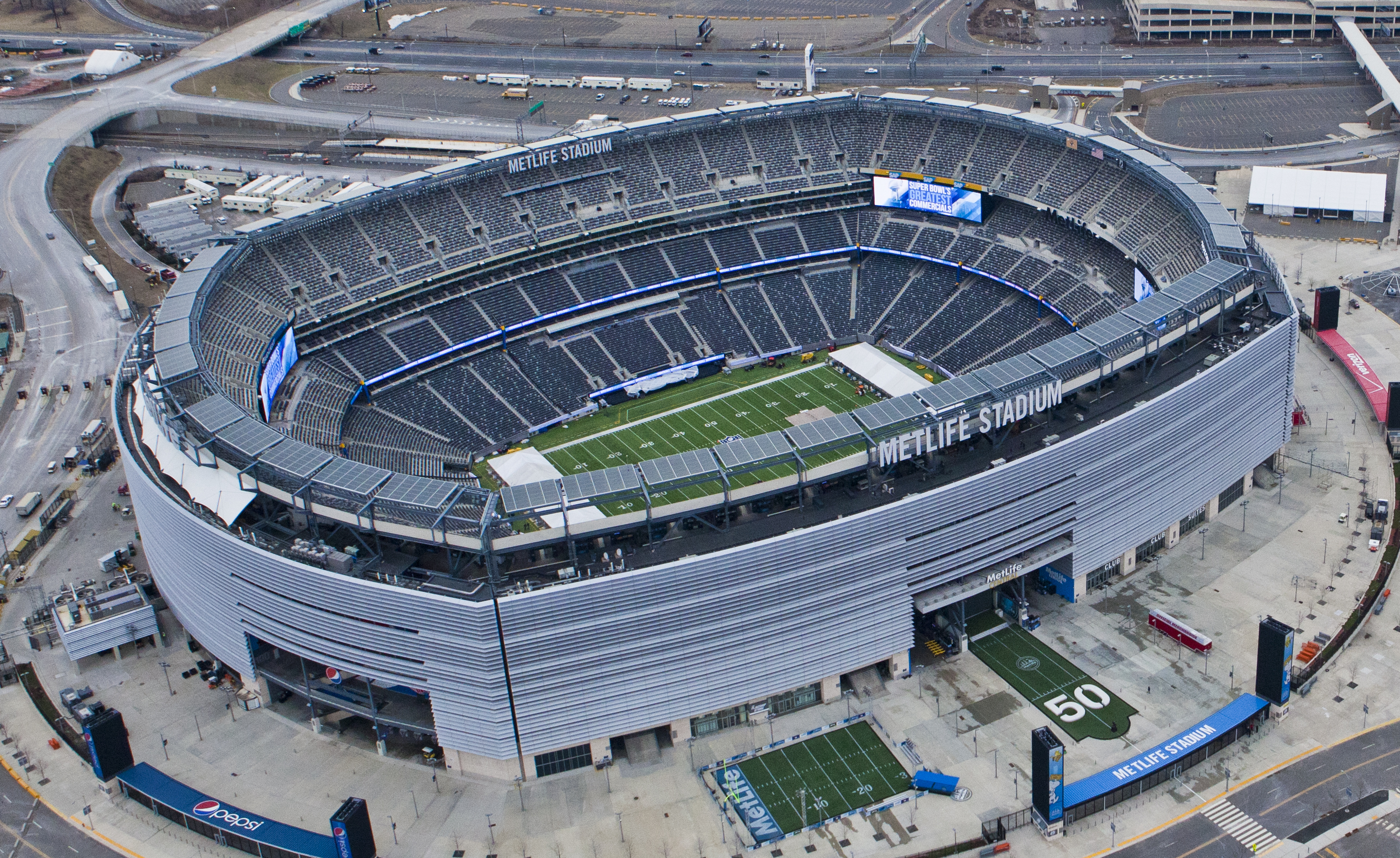
MetLife Stadium, current home of the Giants

In 2010, the Giants moved from Giants Stadium into MetLife Stadium, then known as the "New Meadowlands Stadium". They won against the Carolina Panthers in the first game at New Meadowlands Stadium but then lost to the Indianapolis Colts in the second "Manning Bowl", so-called due to Eli Manning's brother Peyton playing for the Colts. The Giants dropped one game to the Tennessee Titans before going on a five-game winning streak, beating the Chicago Bears, Houston Texans, Detroit Lions, Dallas Cowboys, and Seattle Seahawks. Before long, the Giants were 6–2 but lost two straight to division foes: to the Cowboys 33–20 at home, and to the Philadelphia Eagles on the road, putting the Giants in second place in the NFC East at 6–4. In first place was the Eagles, but at December 19 the two teams tied at 8–4, setting up a match for first place. The Giants were at home and led 24–3 over the Eagles at halftime. The score was 31–10 with 5:40 left in the game, but Michael Vick led the Eagles to three touchdown drives to tie the game up at 31 with 40 seconds left. After a Giants three-and-out, Matt Dodge punted the ball to DeSean Jackson, who returned it for a touchdown, concluding the Giants' epic collapse. The next game, the Giants lost to the eventual Super Bowl champion Green Bay Packers 45–17, and at 9–6, they faced the Redskins. They had to win and have the Packers lose in order to get into the playoffs. The Giants won 17–14, but the Packers beat the Bears 10–3, so the Giants missed out on the playoffs again, ending a collapse in which the Giants went 4–4 in their last eight games.

===== Super Bowl XLVI champions (2011) =====
During the 2011 preseason, the Giants lost Kevin Boss, Steve Smith, Rich Seubert, Keith Bulluck, Derek Hagan, and Pro Bowl center Shaun O'Hara to free agency. However, the season also saw the emergence of second-year wide receiver Victor Cruz and second-year tight end Jake Ballard. The Giants opened their season with a 28–14 loss to the Washington Redskins at FedEx Field on the 10th anniversary of the September 11th attacks. However, the Giants secured a 6–2 record by the midpoint of the season, including road victories over the Philadelphia Eagles and the New England Patriots. The latter victory ended the Patriots' NFL record home-game winning streak, after a touchdown pass from Manning to Jake Ballard with 15 seconds left in the game.

However, the Giants then suffered a four-game losing streak, including road losses against the resurgent San Francisco 49ers and the New Orleans Saints and home losses to the Eagles and the then-undefeated Green Bay Packers, to make their record 6–6 entering December. The Giants broke their losing streak with a 37–34 road victory over the Cowboys on December 11 with Jason Pierre-Paul blocking a last second field goal attempt, but lost at home to the Washington Redskins the following week to make their record 7–7 with a Christmas Eve showdown against their crosstown rival New York Jets the following week. The Giants won, 29–14, and knocked the Eagles out of playoff contention, to set up a Week 17 home game against the Cowboys in which the winner would clinch the NFC East while the loser would be eliminated from playoff contention. The game was flexed into Sunday Night Football. The Giants defeated the Cowboys, 31–14 and clinched the NFC East title and the fourth seed in the playoffs. Wide receiver Victor Cruz finished the regular season with 1,536 receiving yards, breaking the Giants franchise record previously held by Amani Toomer.

On January 8, 2012, in the first round of the playoffs, the Giants defeated the Atlanta Falcons 24–2. After giving up an early safety in the first half, quarterback Eli Manning threw for three consecutive touchdowns. Running backs Ahmad Bradshaw and Brandon Jacobs combined for 172 yards (157.28 m) rushing, a season-high for the Giants. With the victory, the Giants advanced to the second round against the top-ranked Green Bay Packers 37–20.

On January 15, 2012, the Giants defeated the Green Bay Packers 37–20. Eli Manning threw for 330 yards (301.75 m) and 3 touchdowns, two of which to wide receiver Hakeem Nicks. This earned the Giants a spot in the NFC Championship Game on January 22, 2012, against the San Francisco 49ers. They won this game 20–17, in overtime, with Tynes scoring the winning field goal as he did four years earlier in the same game against the Packers.

The New York Giants won Super Bowl XLVI against the New England Patriots with a score of 21–17. The winning touchdown was preceded by a 38-yard reception by receiver Mario Manningham. As in Super Bowl XLII, Eli Manning was Super Bowl MVP, defeating the Patriots for a second time in the Super Bowl.

Ahmad Bradshaw scored the game-winning touchdown by falling into the end zone. The Patriots were allowing Bradshaw to get the touchdown so they would get the ball with some time remaining. When Eli Manning handed the ball to Bradshaw, he told him not to score. Bradshaw was about to fall down at the 1-yard line but his momentum carried him in, thus the "reluctant touchdown."

As was the case in each of their four previous Super Bowl appearances, the Giants trailed at halftime. They are the only team in NFL history to have more than two second half, come-from-behind, Super Bowl victories (4). The Pittsburgh Steelers, who accomplished this feat in Super Bowl X and Super Bowl XIV, are the only other team to do it more than once.

The Giants began the 2012 season with a home loss to the Dallas Cowboys, but rebounded to finish October with a 6–2 record and on a four-game winning streak that included a 26–3 road victory against the eventual NFC champion San Francisco 49ers. Following the arrival of Hurricane Sandy in the Northeastern United States, the Giants lost back-to-back games against the Pittsburgh Steelers and the Cincinnati Bengals to fall to 6–4. Despite impressive blowout home victories over the Green Bay Packers, New Orleans Saints and Philadelphia Eagles, the Giants finished the season 9–7 and out of the playoffs. Quarterback Eli Manning, defensive end Jason Pierre-Paul, wide receiver Victor Cruz, and guard Chris Snee represented the Giants at the Pro Bowl.

The 2013 season began with hope that the Giants could become the first team to play in the Super Bowl in their home stadium, as MetLife Stadium was scheduled to host Super Bowl XLVIII that February. However, the Giants' playoff hopes took a massive hit when they lost the first six games of the season. They rebounded to win the next four games in a row to improve to 4–6, but lost a critical home game to the Dallas Cowboys on a last-minute field goal. They finished the season 7–9 and with a losing record for the first time since 2004. The Giants drafted rookie wide receiver Odell Beckham Jr. in the 2014 NFL draft, who would later go on to win the AP Offensive Rookie of the Year award. However, the Giants missed the playoffs for a third straight season, finishing with a 6–10 record. The 2015 season was another disappointing campaign, as the Giants showcased a struggling defense and several late-game collapses. The Giants finished the season with a 6–10 record and missed the playoffs.

==== 2016–present ====
On January 14, 2016, the Giants announced that Ben McAdoo would become the team's head coach. He replaced Tom Coughlin, who had resigned the previous week. The Giants turned it around in 2016 with an 11–5 record, ending their five-year playoff drought. The Giants later lost to the Green Bay Packers 38–13 in the wild-card round.

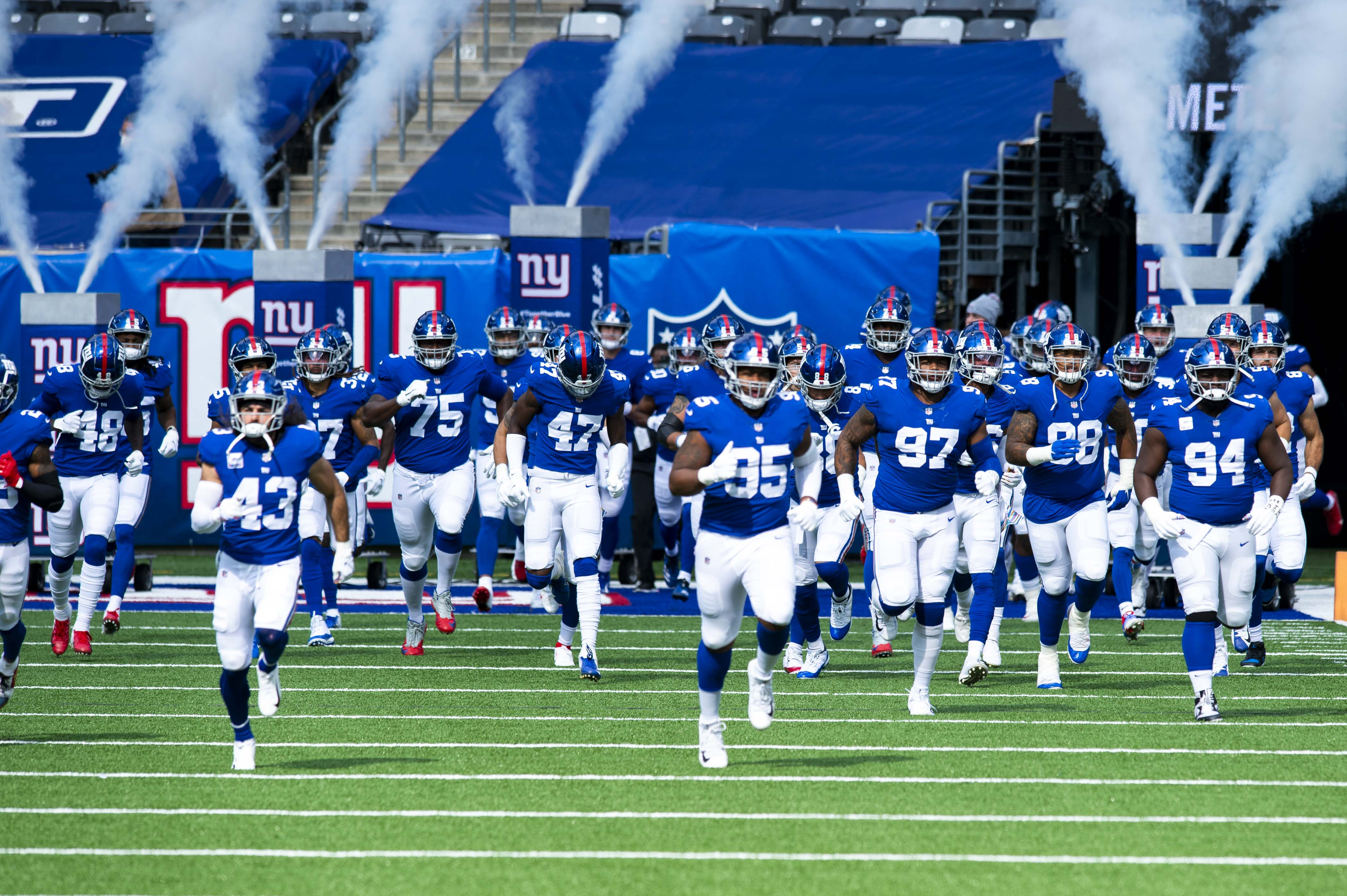
The Giants take the field against the Washington Football Team in 2020

After having high expectations due to their 11–5 record in 2016, the Giants had an unexpected 0–5 start to the 2017 season, before pulling a massive upset versus the Denver Broncos at Sports Authority Field at Mile High for their first win of the season. However, during the Week 5 game against the Los Angeles Chargers, Odell Beckham Jr. fractured his ankle, an injury that ended his season. During the same game, the Giants also lost wide receivers Brandon Marshall and Dwayne Harris to season-ending injuries. The season was also marred by the suspensions of Dominique Rodgers-Cromartie and Janoris Jenkins. The Giants finished the 2017 season with a 3–13 record, the second-worst in the league. This was also the first time since 1983 in which the Giants finished the regular season with three or less wins, and their worst record since the 16-game season was adopted in the NFL.

The season was also highlighted by the controversial benching of longtime quarterback Eli Manning in Week 13, and the high-profile firings of head coach Ben McAdoo and general manager Jerry Reese, who were the first mid-season staff firings since the 1976 Giants' season. Manning was eventually renamed the starter in Week 14. Subsequently, the disastrous season led to the team being awarded the second overall pick in the 2018 NFL draft, which they utilized to select Saquon Barkley from Penn State. Despite Barkley's selection, several questions pertained into the following season around the team's offensive line and long-term future at quarterback.

The 2018 season began with Pat Shurmur being hired as the new head coach. Despite starting 1–7 for the second consecutive year, the Giants managed to marginally improve on their 3–13 campaign by finishing the season 5–11 in a 30–27 overtime win against the Chicago Bears. After defeating the Washington Redskins in Week 14, the Giants became the first team in NFL history to win 100 regular season games against an opponent. However, this ensured last place in the NFC East for the second straight year, marking the first time they were division rock bottom in back-to-back years since 1977 and 1978. The season was also highlighted by blown fourth-quarter leads which was similar to their 2015 team, where the Giants were in 12 one-possession games, and lost 8 of those by 7 points or less. Following the season's end, the team was placed to select sixth overall in the 2019 NFL draft. Barkley impressed in his rookie season, breaking several NFL and Giants team records for a rookie, including having the most receptions by a running back (91), most rushing touchdowns (11), most rushing yards (1,307), and most touchdowns in a season (15). He was also selected to the 2019 Pro Bowl, alongside teammates Olivier Vernon, Landon Collins, and Aldrick Rosas in addition to winning offensive rookie of the year honors.

The team used their sixth overall pick in the 2019 NFL draft on Duke quarterback Daniel Jones. The Giants went 4–12 in the 2019 season. After the 2019 season, the Giants' longtime quarterback, Eli Manning, retired after spending 16 seasons with the organization, while the team finished the season with a 4–12 record. Following the season, Shurmur was fired as head coach. Prior to the 2020 season, the Giants hired Joe Judge as head coach. At the start of the 2020 season, Daniel Jones took over as starting quarterback as the Giants finished 6–10, while tight end Evan Engram and cornerback James Bradberry were named to the 2021 Pro Bowl as reserves.

In the 2021 season the Giants failed to improve on their 2020 record by finishing 4–13. Then after the season, general manager Dave Gettleman retired and head coach Joe Judge was fired. During the season the squad's starting quarterback Daniel Jones sprained his neck and was temporarily replaced in the lineup by Mike Glennon and then Jake Fromm.

On January 21, 2022, the team hired Joe Schoen as the team's general manager, and on January 28, hired Brian Daboll as the team's new head coach. The 2022 season showed a much improved record, with the Giants finishing 9–7–1. On January 1, 2023, the Giants clinched a playoff berth for the first time since the 2016 season. On January 15, the Giants defeated the Minnesota Vikings 31–24 in the wild-card round, winning their first postseason game since their victory at Super Bowl XLVI in 2012. The Giants proceeded to lose the next game to the eventual NFC champion Philadelphia Eagles 38–7 in the divisional round.

In the 2023 season, the Giants regressed on their successful 2022 season, finishing 6–11. Daniel Jones was injured several times in the season and was placed on injured reserve after tearing his ACL in week 9. He was temporarily replaced in the lineup by Tyrod Taylor and Tommy DeVito.

The team further regressed in the 2024 season to a 3–14 record. After their week 10 loss, the Giants were 2–8 and benched Daniel Jones in favor of Tommy DeVito due to poor play. A few days later, on November 22, Jones requested to be released which the Giants granted. The season was plagued by poor quarterback play, numerous key injuries, and poor pass protection similar to the previous season. The Giants also had a 10-game losing streak and were swept by all of their division rivals, both for the first time in franchise history. There were a few bright spots for the Giants, such as their rookie class, which was led by wide receiver Malik Nabers. Nabers broke the Giants franchise record and NFL rookie record for receptions in a season.

The Giants had the 3rd pick in the 2025 draft which they used on edge rusher Abdul Carter, considered one of the best prospects in the draft. They later traded for the 25th pick which they used on Ole Miss quarterback Jaxson Dart.

In the midst of the Giants' 2025 season, and after falling to a 2–8 record after a loss to the Chicago Bears during another blown 4th quarter lead, head coach Brian Daboll was fired on November 10, and offensive coordinator Mike Kafka took the interim head coaching role. That same season, after a loss to the Detroit Lions in the 5th blown fourth quarter lead of the season and falling to 2–10, Kafka fired defensive coordinator Shane Bowen on November 24.

On January 17, 2026, the Giants hired John Harbaugh, the longtime coach of the Baltimore Ravens to be the next head coach. The deal is reportedly five years and over $20 million annually.

== Championships ==
The Giants have won a total of eight league championships: 1927, 1934, 1938, 1956, 1986, 1990, 2007 and 2011. The first four of those championships came in the pre-Super Bowl era. New York's eight championships put them third among all active and defunct NFL teams, trailing only the Green Bay Packers (13) and the Chicago Bears (9).

=== NFL championships (pre-Super Bowl era) ===
Before the Super Bowl was instituted, the Giants won four officially recognized NFL championships.

Year	Coach	Location	Opponent	Score	Record
1927	Earl Potteiger	N/A	N/A	N/A	11–1–1
1934	Steve Owen	Polo Grounds (Manhattan)	Chicago Bears	30–13	8–5
1938	Steve Owen	Polo Grounds (Manhattan)	Green Bay Packers	23–17	8–2–1
1956	Jim Lee Howell	Yankee Stadium (The Bronx)	Chicago Bears	47–7	8–3–1
Total NFL championships won:				4	

=== Super Bowl championships ===
The Giants have won four Super Bowls, tied with Green Bay and Kansas City for the fifth most behind Dallas, San Francisco (both with 5), and New England and Pittsburgh (6 each).

Year	Coach	Super Bowl	Location	Opponent	Score	Record
1986	Bill Parcells	XXI	Rose Bowl (Pasadena)	Denver Broncos	39–20	17–2
1990	Bill Parcells	XXV	Tampa Stadium (Tampa)	Buffalo Bills	20–19	16–3
2007	Tom Coughlin	XLII	University of Phoenix Stadium (Glendale)	New England Patriots	17–14	14–6
2011	Tom Coughlin	XLVI	Lucas Oil Stadium (Indianapolis)	New England Patriots	21–17	13–7
Total Super Bowls won:					4	

=== NFC championships ===
The Giants have won five NFC Championship Games, including two in overtime in 2007 and 2011.

Year	Coach	Location	Opponent	Score	Record
1986	Bill Parcells	Giants Stadium (East Rutherford)	Washington Redskins	17–0	17–2
1990	Bill Parcells	Candlestick Park (San Francisco)	San Francisco 49ers	15–13	16–3
2000	Jim Fassel	Giants Stadium (East Rutherford)	Minnesota Vikings	41–0	14–5
2007	Tom Coughlin	Lambeau Field (Green Bay)	Green Bay Packers	23–20 (OT)	14–6
2011	Tom Coughlin	Candlestick Park (San Francisco)	San Francisco 49ers	20–17 (OT)	13–7
Total NFC Championships won:				5	

== Logos and uniforms ==
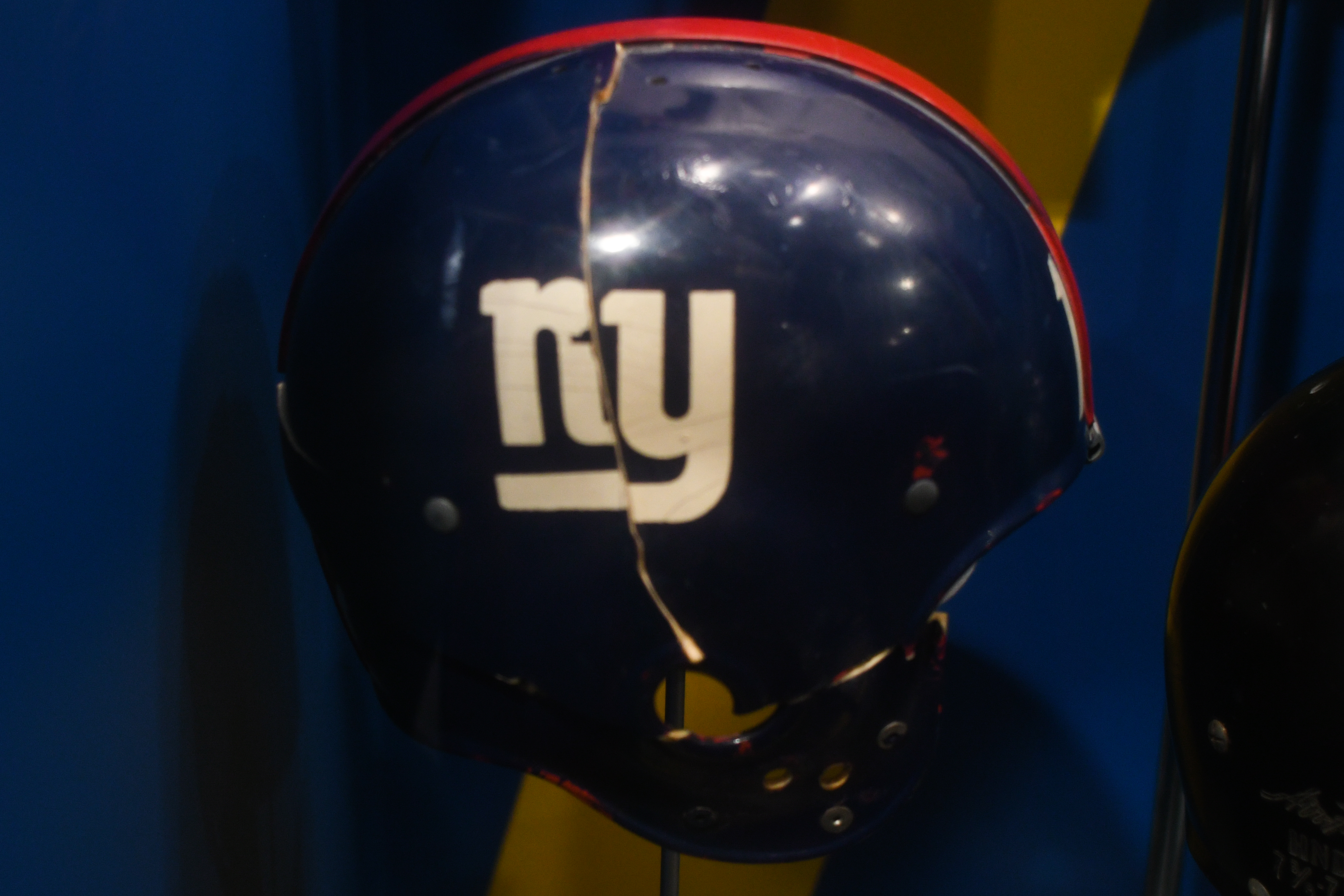
New York Giants helmet at the Pro Football Hall of Fame

With over 100 years of team history, the Giants have used numerous uniforms and logos, while maintaining a consistent identity. The Giants' logos include several incarnations of a giant quarterback preparing to throw a football, a lowercase "ny", and stylized versions of the team nickname.

Giants' jerseys are traditionally blue or red (or white with blue or red accents), and their pants alternate between white and gray. Currently, the Giants wear home jerseys that are solid blue with white block numbering, white pants with five thin blue/gray/red/gray/blue stripes on the pant legs, and solid blue socks. For this they gained their most renowned nickname, "Big Blue". For road uniforms, they wear a white jersey with red block numbering and red "Northwestern" stripes on the sleeves, white pants with red "Northwestern" stripes on the pant legs, and solid red socks. The Giants' current helmet is metallic blue with white block numbers, which are frontally mounted and base mounted on either side of a red stripe running down the center or frontally mounted and base mounted on the red center stripe itself. The Giants, along with the Pittsburgh Steelers, are one of only two teams in the NFL to have the players' uniform numbers on both the front and back of the helmets. The helmet is adorned on both sides with the stylized white lower case "ny" logo and features a gray facemask. The home uniforms are generally similar to the design used from 1966 to 1974, but with some slight elements from the 1956–1961 uniforms. The road uniforms are essentially a modernization of the design used from 1956 to 1961. Additionally, the Giants had a third jersey until the 2009 season, which recalled the Giants' solid red home jerseys from the early 1950s: a solid red alternate with white block numbers. These jerseys were used a total of four times, but have since been retired. They were used once in 2004 against the Philadelphia Eagles and in three consecutive years – 2005, 2006, and 2007 – against the Dallas Cowboys.

== Ownerships, financial history and fan base ==
The Giants have had a long and, at times, turbulent financial history. The team was founded by Tim Mara with an investment of US$500 in 1925 and became one of the first teams in the then five-year-old NFL. To differentiate themselves from the baseball team of the same name, they took the name "New York Football Giants", which they still use as their legal corporate name.

Although the Giants were successful on the field in their initial seasons, their financial status was a different story. Overshadowed by baseball, boxing, and college football, professional football was not a popular sport in 1925. The Giants were in dire financial straits until the 11th game of the season when Red Grange and the Chicago Bears came to town, attracting over 73,000 fans. This gave the Giants a much needed influx of revenue, and perhaps altered the history of the franchise. The following year, Grange and his agent formed a rival league and stationed a competing team, led by Grange, in New York. Though the Giants lost $50,000 that season, the rival league folded and was subsumed into the NFL. Following the 1930 season, Mara transferred ownership of the team over to his two sons to insulate the team from creditors, and by 1946, he had given over complete control of the team to them. Jack, the older son, controlled the business aspects, while Wellington controlled the on-field operations. After their initial struggles the Giants financial status stabilized, and they led the league in attendance several times in the 1930s and 1940s. Tim Mara died in 1959.

Giants estimated value from 1998 to 2006 according to Forbes magazine.

By the early 1960s, the Giants had firmly established themselves as one of the league's biggest attractions. However, rather than continuing to receive their higher share of the league television revenue, the Mara sons pushed for equal sharing of revenue for the benefit of the entire league. Revenue sharing is still practiced in the NFL today, and is credited with strengthening the league. After their struggles in the latter half of the 1960s and the entire 1970s, the Giants hired an outsider, George Young, to run the football operations for the first time in franchise history. The Giants' on-field product and business aspects improved rapidly following the move.

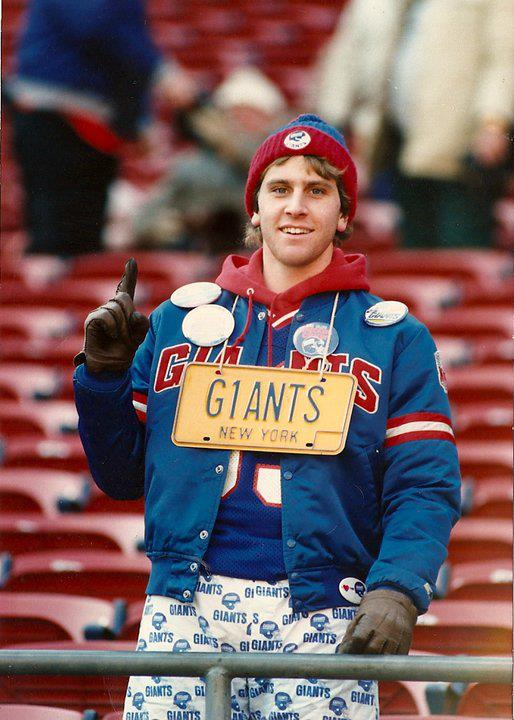
"License Plate Guy" at Giants Stadium wearing his first plate "G1ANTS"

In 1991, Tim Mara, grandson of the founder, was struggling with cancer and sold his half of the team to Bob Tisch for a reported $80 million. This marked the first time in franchise history the team had not been solely owned by the Mara family. In 2005, Wellington Mara, who had been with the team since its inception in 1925 when he worked as a ball boy, died at the age of 89. His death was followed two weeks later by the death of Tisch. In 2015, Wellington's widow and Giants co-owner Ann died due to complications from a head injury suffered in a fall. She was 85 years old.

In 2010, MetLife Stadium opened, replacing Giants Stadium. The new stadium is a 50/50 partnership between the Giants and Jets, and while the stadium is owned by the New Jersey Sports and Exposition Authority on paper, the two teams jointly built the stadium using private funds, and administer it jointly through New Meadowlands Stadium Corporation. The Giants had previously planned a $300 million renovation to the Meadowlands, before deciding in favor of the new stadium which was originally estimated to cost approximately $600 million, before rising to an estimated cost of one billion dollars. One advantage gained by owning the stadium is that the teams saved considerable money in tax payments. The teams leased the land from the state at a cost of $6.3 million per year. The state paid for all utilities, including the $30 million needed to install them.

The Giants are owned and operated by John Mara and Steve Tisch. Forbes magazine estimated the value of the team in 2012 to be $1.3 billion. This ranks the New York Giants as the fourth most valuable franchise in the NFL and the ninth most valuable professional sports franchise in the world. The value has steadily increased from $288 million in 1998, to their current value. The magazine estimated their revenue in 2006 at $182 million, of which $46 million came from gate receipts. Operating income was $26.9 million, and player salary was $102 million. Current major sponsors include Gatorade, Anheuser Busch, Toyota, and Verizon Wireless. Recent former sponsors include Miller Brewing and North Fork Bank. Luxury suites, retail and game day concessions at the new stadium are provisioned and operated by global hospitality giant Delaware North. The team's average ticket price is $72.

The Giants draw their fans from the New York metropolitan area. Since their move to New Jersey in 1976, fans from each state have claimed the team as their own. In January 1987, shortly before the team won Super Bowl XXI, then New York City mayor Ed Koch labeled the team "foreigners" and said they were not entitled to a ticker-tape parade in New York City. On February 5, 2008, the city, under mayor Michael Bloomberg, threw a ticker tape parade in honor of the Giants' Super Bowl XLII victory at the Canyon of Heroes in lower Manhattan. New York City held another ticker tape parade on February 7, 2012, in honor of the Giants' Super Bowl XLVI victory. According to a team spokesman, in 2001, 52 percent of the Giants' season ticket-holders lived in New Jersey. Most of the remaining ticket holders lived in New York State with some coming from other states. The Giants also draw fans from the Canadian province of Quebec mostly due to the province sharing a significant international border with New York State — New York City is only five to six hours away from Montreal by car.

Through the lean years of the 1960s and 1970s the Giants, in spite of a 17-year-long playoff drought, still accumulated a 20-year-long waiting list for season tickets. It has been estimated that the Giants have a waiting list of 135,000 people, the largest of any North American professional sports franchise.

In September 2025, Julia Koch and her family agreed to acquire a 10% minority stake in the Giants, valuing the franchise at over $10 billion. The transaction is subject to approval by NFL owners.

== Rivalries ==
=== Divisional ===
==== Philadelphia Eagles ====
The rivalry between the New York Giants and the Philadelphia Eagles is one of the oldest in the NFL, dating back to 1933. The two teams have frequently fought for playoff contention, NFC East titles, and respect. While the Giants had the edge this rivalry early on in its history, the series began to even after the 1980s, with the Eagles going 22–21 against New York through the 1990s and 2000s. Philadelphia then dominated New York in the 2010s with a 16–4 record to claim their first lead in the series. Two key games or moments to look at are the "Miracle of the Meadowlands", and "The Hit". These two games helped create the intense rivalry still to this day even though these moments happened over 50 years ago. The Eagles lead the all-time series 94–89–2 as of the 2023 season. The two teams have met five times in the postseason, with the Giants winning two games to the Eagles three. Three of those four playoff meetings were held in the 2000s decade. New York City and Philadelphia have a strong geographic rivalry, as seen in other professional sports such as the Mets–Phillies rivalry in Major League Baseball, and the Flyers–Rangers, Flyers–Islanders and Devils–Flyers rivalries in the National Hockey League.

==== Washington Commanders ====
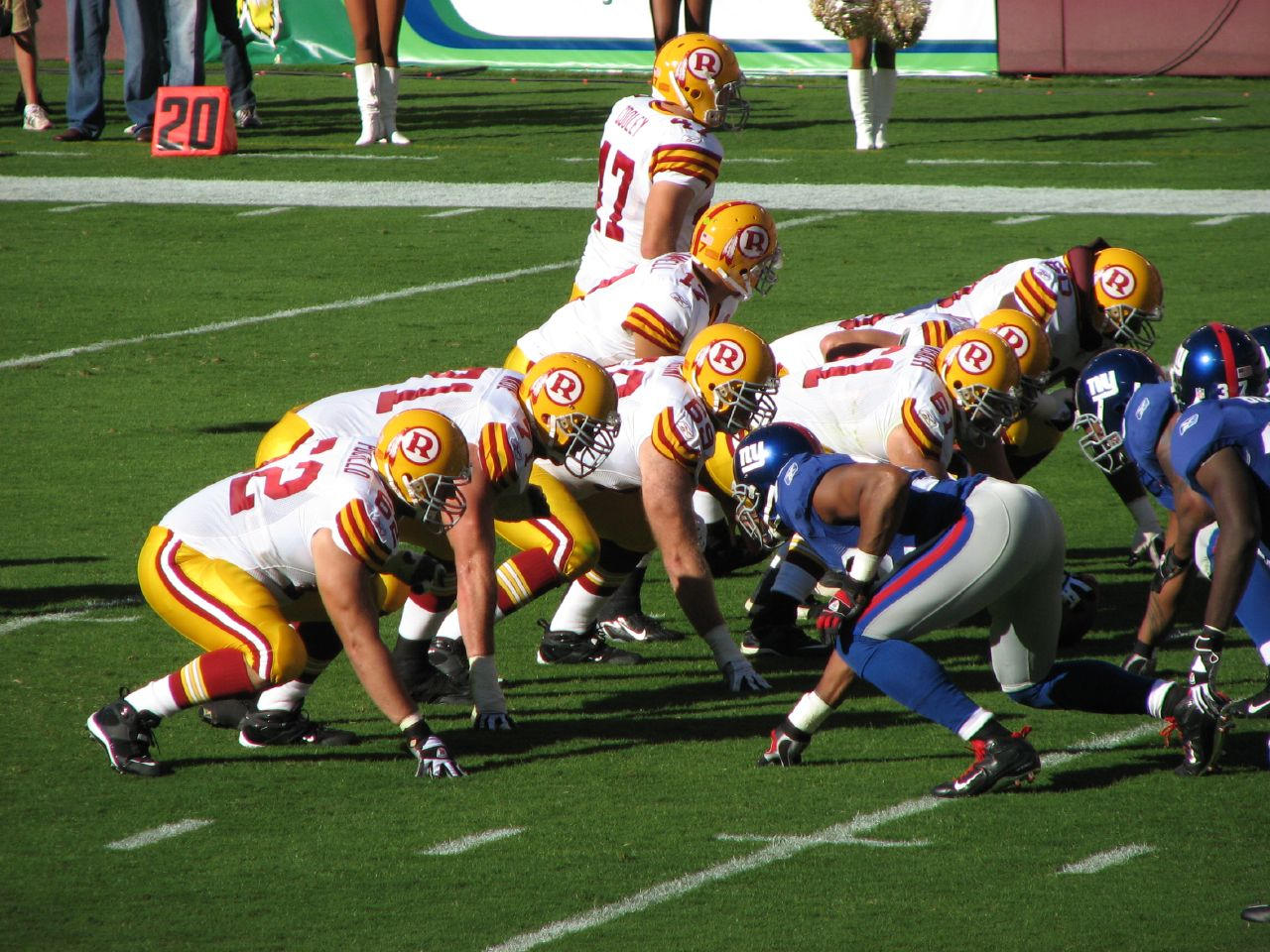
The Redskins gather at the line of scrimmage against the Giants.

The Giants have an old and storied rivalry with the Washington Commanders, dating back to 1932. While this rivalry is typically given less significance than the rivalries with the Eagles and Cowboys, there have been periods of great competition between the two. In the 1980s the Giants and Redskins, as they were then known, clashed as both struggled against each other for division titles and even Super Bowl Championships. Most notable among these is the 1986 NFC Championship game in which the Giants defeated the Redskins 17–0 to earn their first ever trip to the Super Bowl. Wellington Mara always felt the Redskins were the Giants' oldest and truest rival, and after dying in 2005, the Giants honored their longtime owner by defeating the Redskins 36–0 at home. The Giants lead this series 107–74–5 as of the 2025 season.

==== Dallas Cowboys ====
The Giants have maintained a fierce divisional rivalry with the Dallas Cowboys since the Cowboys first began play in 1960. The two teams have a combined nine Super Bowl victories between them, and have played many games in which the NFC East title was at stake. The rivalry is unique among professional sports as it is the only divisional rivalry between sports teams from New York City and Dallas, partially due to the large distance between the two cities. The Cowboys lead the regular season series 75–47–2, while the Giants hold the lone playoff victory between the two teams, held at the conclusion of the 2007 season.

=== Conference ===
==== San Francisco 49ers ====
Despite never being in the same division, the Giants and San Francisco 49ers have developed a heated rivalry over the years. The two teams have met eight times in the playoffs (including two NFC Championship Games, both won by New York) since 1982, which is the most of any two teams in that span. In the overall series the 49ers lead 22–21, while the postseason series are also tied 4–4. Five of the eight times the Giants and 49ers have played in the postseason, the winner of their game has gone on to win the Super Bowl.

=== Interconference ===
==== New York Jets ====
The Giants and New York Jets for many years had the only intracity rivalry in the NFL, made even more unusual by sharing a stadium. They have met annually in the preseason since 1969. Since 2011, this meeting has been known as the "MetLife Bowl", after the naming sponsor of the teams' stadium. Regular season matchups between the teams occur once every four years, as they follow the NFL scheduling formula for interconference games. Since the two teams play each other so infrequently in the regular season, some, including players on both teams, have questioned whether the Giants and Jets have a real rivalry. A memorable regular season game was in 1988, when the Giants faced off against the Jets in the last game of the season, needing a victory to make the playoffs. The Jets played spoiler, however, beating the Giants 27–21 and ruining the latter's playoff hopes. A different scenario unfolded during the penultimate regular season game of 2011 as the "visiting" Giants defeated the Jets 29–14. The victory simultaneously helped eliminate the Jets from playoff contention and propel the Giants to their own playoff run and eventual win in Super Bowl XLVI. The Giants lead the overall regular season series 8–7.

==== New England Patriots ====
The Giants and New England Patriots rarely played each other given they were on opposite conferences, but the rivalry gained notoriety in the late 2000s thanks to some close contests and memorable moments between Tom Brady and Eli Manning. In the 2007 season, the Patriots defeated the Giants 38–35 to clinch a perfect 16–0 regular season, but could not finish a perfect 19–0 season in Super Bowl XLII following a 17–14 defeat. That game featured the now-iconic Helmet Catch from David Tyree. The Giants also defeated the Patriots in Super Bowl XLVI, a 21–17 victory. As of the 2023 season, the all-time series is tied 7–7.

=== Historic ===
==== Chicago Bears ====
The Giants and Chicago Bears squared off in six NFL championship games, more than any common matchup in either the NFL championship game or Super Bowl. Though the Bears won four of the six championship games, one of the Giants' two championship victories included the Sneakers Game that took place in the 1934 NFL Championship Game. The two teams also met in the 1985 and 1990 playoffs, splitting each meeting en route to a Super Bowl championship (Bears in Super Bowl XX, Giants in Super Bowl XXV). The Bears lead the all-time series 36–24–2, including a 5–3 postseason record.

==== Green Bay Packers ====
The Giants–Packers rivalry is a National Football League (NFL) rivalry between the New York Giants and the Green Bay Packers. The two teams have played since 1970 in the National Football Conference, and they play each other in the regular season either every three years or depending on its NFC division placement, and in the postseason, The Packers lead the all-time series 34–28–2 and postseason series 5–3.

== Players ==
=== Current roster ===
New York Giants roster
Quarterbacks (QB): 18 J. J. McCarthy; 19 Jameis Winston; Running backs (RB): 30 Gregory Desrosiers; 45 Patrick Ricard FB; 26 Devin Singletary; 44 Cam Skattebo; Wide receivers (WR): 88 Malachi Fields; 80 Xavier Gipson; 81 Jalin Hyatt; 17 Darnell Mooney; 1 Malik Nabers; Tight ends (TE): 86 Thomas Fidone; 84 Theo Johnson; 9 Isaiah Likely; 85 Chris Manhertz	Offensive linemen (OL): 74 J. C. Davis T; 72 Jermaine Eluemunor T; 60 Bryan Hudson C; 65 Francis Mauigoa G; 71 Marcus Mbow T; 76 Jon Runyan Jr. G; 61 John Michael Schmitz C; 67 Josh Sills T; 64 Aaron Stinnie G; 78 Andrew Thomas T; Defensive linemen (DL): 91 Darius Alexander; 93 Shelby Harris; 97 Bobby Jamison-Travis; 99 C. J. Okoye; 98 D. J. Reader	Linebackers (LB): 46 Zaire Barnes; 3 Abdul Carter OLB; 48 Trace Ford OLB; 54 Malik Harrison; 51 Jack Kelly; 41 Micah McFadden; 52 Arvell Reese; 5 Kayvon Thibodeaux OLB; Defensive backs (DB): 21 Paulson Adebo CB; 2 Deonte Banks CB; 28 Elijah Campbell S; 8 Jevon Holland S; 12 Colton Hood CB; 31 Nic Jones CB; 20 Greg Newsome II CB; 27 Tyler Nubin S; 22 Dru Phillips CB; 25 Jason Pinnock S; 37 Tavierre Thomas S; 24 Ar'Darius Washington S; Special teams (ST): 58 Ben Mann LS; 15 Jordan Stout P; 34 Dominic Zvada K	Practice squad: 83 Dalen Cambre WR; 47 Grant Finley FB; 38 Dontae Fleming WR; 68 Josh Gesky OL; 79 Jarrod Gray OL (IPP); 53 Kendrick Green OL; 13 Jake Haener QB; 89 Charlie Jones WR; 43 Raheem Layne S; 75 Dean Lowry DL; 36 Phil Mafah RB; 55 Chandler Martin LB; 90 P. J. Mustipher DT; 35 Nikko Reed CB; 33 Jaden Robinson CB; 70 Ryan Schernecke T; 96 Dawuane Smoot OLB; Reserve: 82 Calvin Austin WR (IR); -- Jarrick Bernard-Converse CB (IR); 87 Braxton Berrios WR (IR); -- Korie Black CB (IR); 0 Brian Burns OLB (IR); 6 Jaxson Dart QB (IR); 39 Thaddeus Dixon CB (IR); 49 Tremaine Edmunds LB (IR); 57 Chauncey Golston DE (IR); -- Gunner Olszewski WR (IR); -- Rico Payton CB (IR); 95 Roy Robertson-Harris DT (IR); 29 Tyrone Tracy Jr. RB (IR) 53 active, 16 practice squad (1 IPP), 13 reserve As of November 18, 2026. Rookies in italics.; Roster; Depth chart; Transactions

=== Retired numbers ===
New York Giants retired numbers
No.	Player	Position	Career	Retired
~~1~~	~~Ray Flaherty~~ ^{1}	E	1928–1935	1935–2024
~~3~~	~~Len Grant~~ ^{2} ^{3}	OT	1930–1937	1938–1966
4	Tuffy Leemans	RB	1936–1943	1940
7	Mel Hein	C, LB	1931–1945	1963
10	Eli Manning	QB	2004–2019	September 26, 2021
11	Phil Simms	QB	1979–1993	September 4, 1995
14	Ward Cuff ^{4}	HB, WB	1937–1945	1946
14	Y. A. Tittle ^{4}	QB	1961–1964	1965
16	Frank Gifford	HB, WR	1952–1964	October 19, 2000
32	Al Blozis ^{3}	OT	1942–1944	1945
40	Joe Morrison	RB, WR	1959–1972	1972
42	Charlie Conerly	QB	1948–1961	1962
50	Ken Strong	HB	1933–1947	1947
56	Lawrence Taylor	LB	1981–1993	October 11, 1994
92	Michael Strahan	DE	1993–2007	November 28, 2021

Notes:

- ^{1} Retired in 1935, this was the first number to be retired in professional football. The number was unretired in 2024 for Malik Nabers after he received permission to wear it from the Flaherty family.
- ^{2} The Giants retired the #3 in honor of tackle and team captain Len Grant, who was killed by a lightning strike while golfing just before training camp opened in 1938. His number was returned to service in 1966 at the request of Pete Gogolak and has remained in use.
- ^{3} Posthumous honor.
- ^{4} The number 14 was retired in honor of Ward Cuff in 1946. Y. A. Tittle requested 14 after the Giants traded for him in 1961, and it was retired a second time in 1964 at the conclusion of Tittle's playing career. The number is now retired in honor of both players.

=== Pro Football Hall of Famers ===
In the Pro Football Hall of Fame, the Giants boast the second-most enshrined members with 29. Tim Mara, Mel Hein, Pete Henry, Cal Hubbard and Jim Thorpe were a part of the original class of inductees in 1963, while defensive end Michael Strahan, the most recent Giant inducted, was a part of the Class of 2014. Numerous members, including Larry Csonka, Ray Flaherty, Joe Guyon, Pete Henry, Arnie Herber, Cal Hubbard, Tom Landry, Don Maynard, Hugh McElhenny, Jim Thorpe, and Kurt Warner were at one time associated with the New York Giants, but they were inducted largely based on their careers with other teams.

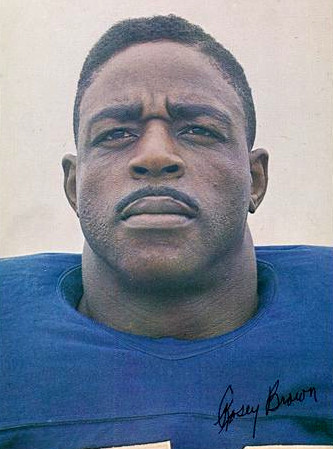
Hall of Fame OT Rosey Brown

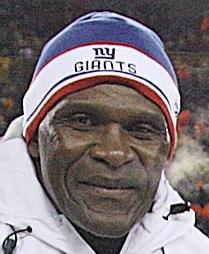
Hall of Fame LB Harry Carson

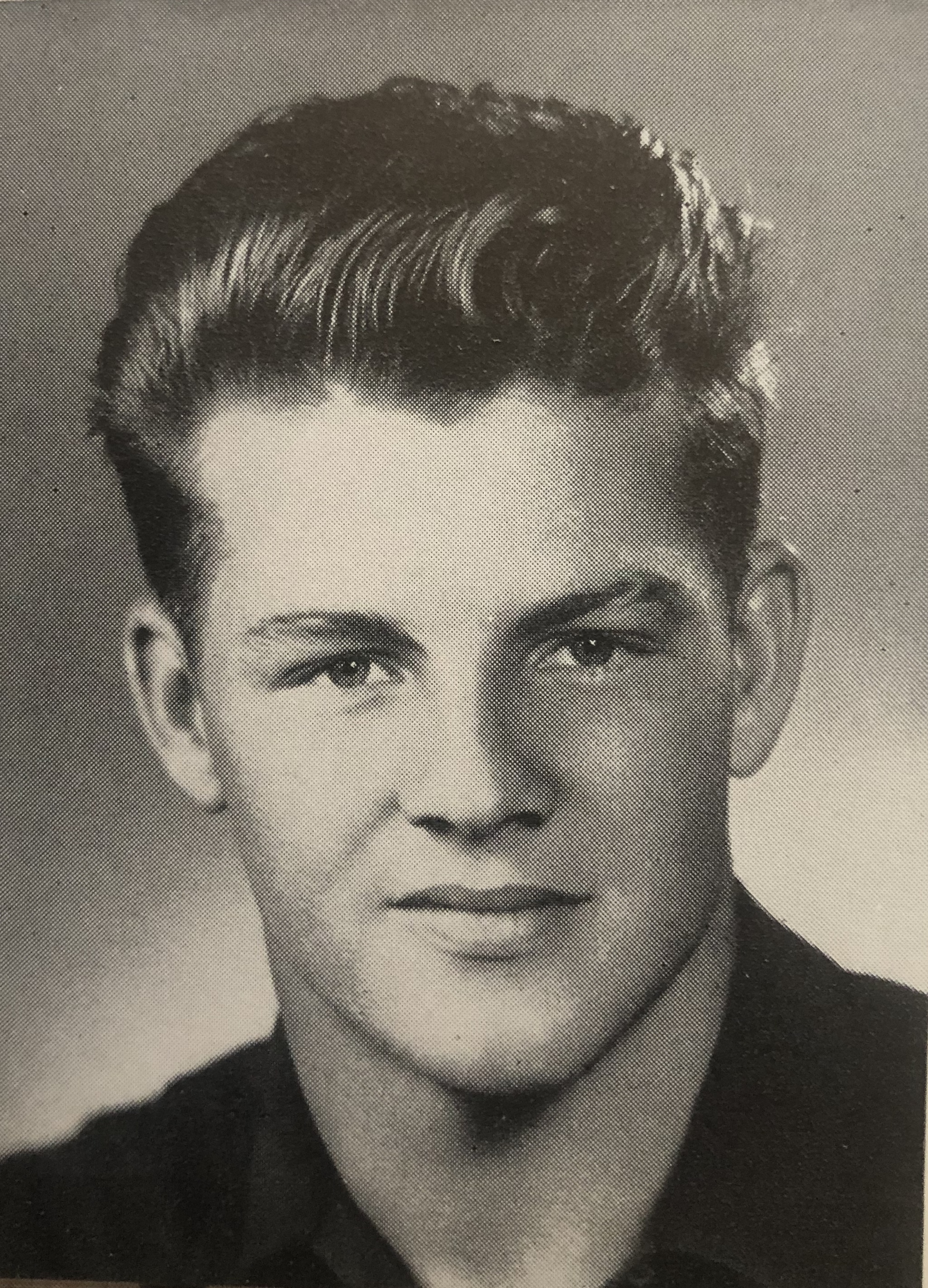
Hall of Fame HB Frank Gifford

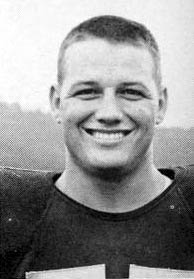
Hall of Fame LB Sam Huff

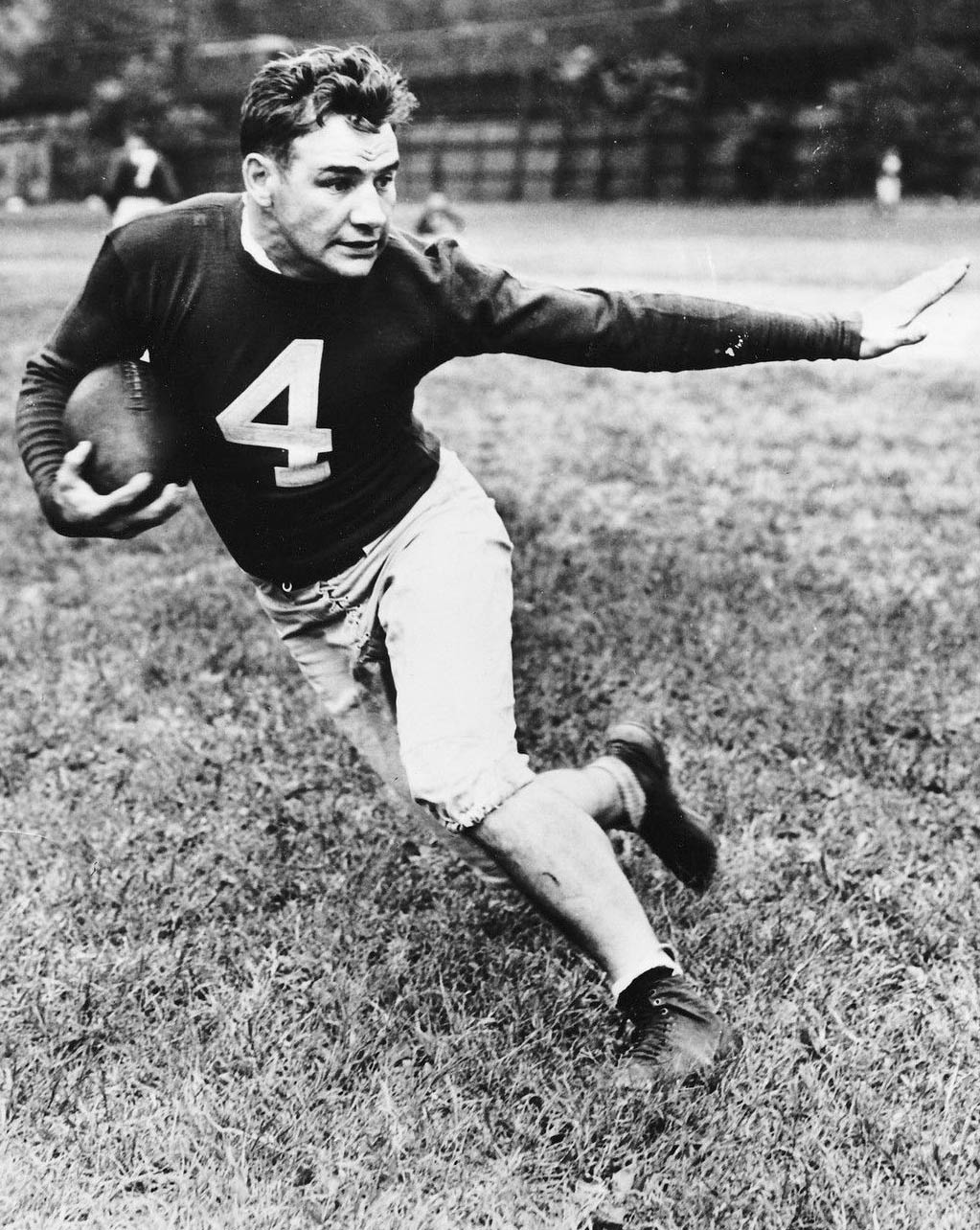
Hall of Fame FB Tuffy Leemans

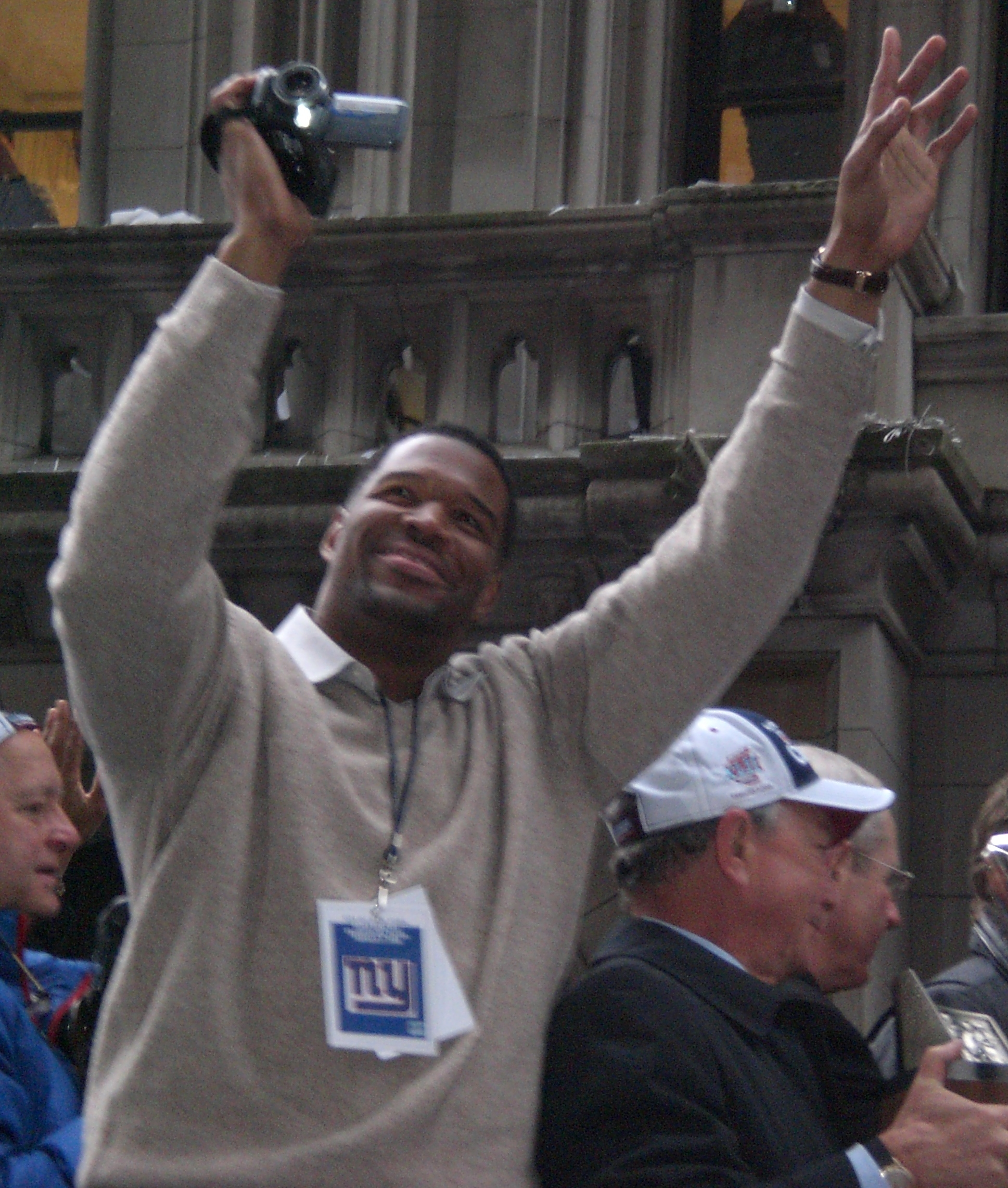
Hall of Fame DE Michael Strahan

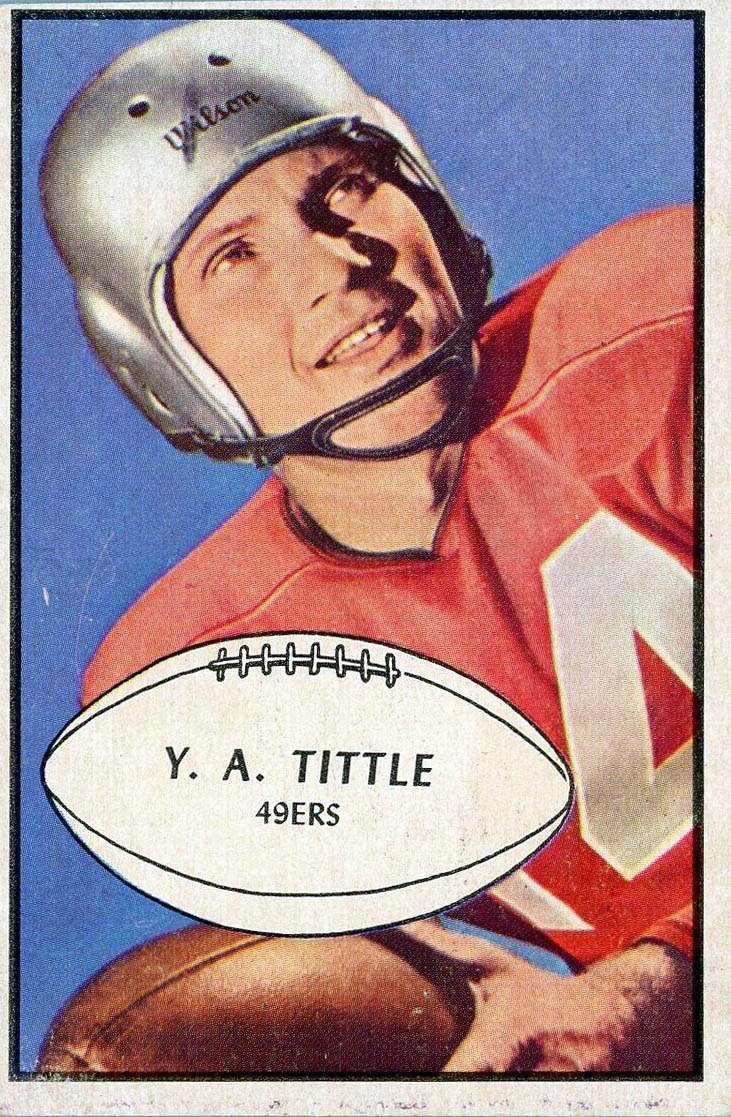
Hall of Fame QB Y.A. Tittle

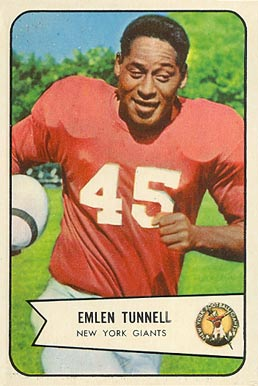
Hall of Fame CB Emlen Tunnell

New York Giants Hall of Famers
Players
No.	Name	Position	Tenure	Inducted	No.	Name	Position	Tenure	Inducted
17	Red Badgro	TE/DE	1930–1935	1981	4	Tuffy Leemans	FB	1936–1943	1990
79	Rosey Brown	T	1953–1965	1975	13	Don Maynard	WR	1958	1987
53	Harry Carson	LB	1976–1988	2006	13	Hugh McElhenny	RB	1963	1970
39	Larry Csonka	FB	1976–1978	1987	55	Steve Owen	T Coach	1926–1933; 1930–1953	1966
1	Ray Flaherty	E	1928–1935	1976	81	Andy Robustelli	DE	1956–1964	1971
6	Benny Friedman	QB; Coach	1929–1931; 1930	2005	92	Michael Strahan	DE	1993–2007	2014
16	Frank Gifford	HB	1952–1960; 1962–1964	1977	50	Ken Strong	HB/FB/K	1933–1935; 1939; 1944–1947	1967
11	Joe Guyon	RB	1927	1978	10	Fran Tarkenton	QB	1967–1971	1986
7	Mel Hein	C/LB	1931–1945	1963	56	Lawrence Taylor	OLB	1981–1993	1999
55	Pete Henry	OT	1927	1963	31	Jim Thorpe	RB, DB	1925	1963
38	Arnie Herber	QB	1944–1945	1963	14	Y. A. Tittle	QB	1961–1964	1971
41; 60	Cal Hubbard	OT	1927–1928; 1936	1966	45	Emlen Tunnell	CB	1948–1958	1967
70	Sam Huff	ILB	1956–1963	1982	73	Arnie Weinmeister	DE	1950–1953	1984
49	Tom Landry	S	1950–1955	1982	8	Morten Andersen	K	2001	2017
13	Kurt Warner	QB	2004	2017					
Coaches and Contributors
Name		Position	Tenure	Inducted	Name		Position	Tenure	Inducted
Tim Mara		Owner and founder	1925–1959	1963	Wellington Mara		Owner/Administrator	1937–2005	1997
Bill Parcells		Coach	1983–1990	2013	George Young		Executive	1979–1997	2020

=== Ring of Honor ===
The New York Giants unveiled their own Ring of Honor on October 3, 2010, during halftime of their Sunday Night Football matchup with the Chicago Bears. John Mara had long wished to create a Giants Ring of Honor and Hall of Fame to honor Giants who helped the franchise achieve each of their championships, and the building of MetLife Stadium resulted in the realization of that ambition. The organization had an inaugural induction class of 30 including players, coaches, owners and executives that have had a great impact on the organization. While the entire list of inductees was not revealed until the actual induction, the organization did confirm about a week before the ceremony that Phil Simms, Bill Parcells, Michael Strahan, Tiki Barber, Frank Gifford and Pete Gogolak would all be inducted.

Elected to the Pro Football Hall of Fame

New York Giants Ring of Honor
Name	Position	No.	Years active	Championships	Inducted
Ernie Accorsi	Executive	—	1994–2007	—	2016
Ottis "OJ" Anderson	RB	24	1986–1992	1986, 1990	2022
Jessie Armstead	LB	98	1993–2001	—	2010
Carl Banks	LB	58	1984–1992	1986, 1990	2011
Tiki Barber	RB	21	1997–2006	—	2010
Ronnie Barnes	Athletic trainer	—	1976–2022	1986, 1990, 2007, 2011	2022
Mark Bavaro	TE	89	1985–1990	1986, 1990	2011
Al Blozis	OT	32	1942–1944	—	2010
Rosey Brown	OT	79	1953–1965	1956	2010
Harry Carson	LB	53	1976–1988	1986	2010
Charlie Conerly	QB	42	1948–1961	1956	2010
Tom Coughlin	WR Coach; Head Coach	—	1988–1990; 2004–2015	1990, 2007, 2011	2016
Frank Gifford	RB/WR	16	1952–1964	1956	2010
Pete Gogolak	K	3	1966–1974	—	2010
Rodney Hampton	RB	27	1990–1997	1990	2022
Mel Hein	C/LB	7	1931–1945	1934, 1938	2010
Jim Lee Howell	End; Head Coach	21, 81	1937–1942, 1946–1947; 1954–1960	1938, 1956	2010
Sam Huff	LB	70	1956–1963	1956	2010
Dave Jennings	P	13	1974–1984	—	2011
John Johnson	Athletic Trainer	—	1948–2008	1956, 1986, 1990, 2007	2015
Tuffy Leemans	RB	4	1936–1943	1938	2010
Jack Lummus	End	29	1941	—	2015
Dick Lynch	DB	22; 25	1958–1966	—	2010
Eli Manning	QB	10	2004–2019	2007, 2011	2021
Jack Mara	Owner	—	1925–1965	1927, 1934, 1938, 1956	2010
Tim Mara	Owner	—	1925–1959	1927, 1934, 1938, 1956	2010
Wellington Mara	Ball Boy/Executive/Owner	—	1925–2005	1927, 1934, 1938, 1956, 1986, 1990	2010
George Martin	DE	75	1975–1988	1986	2010
Leonard Marshall	DE	70	1982–1992	1986, 1990	2022
Joe Morris	RB	20	1982–1988	1986	2022
Joe Morrison	WR/RB	40	1959–1972	—	2010
Steve Owen	OT/Head coach	6, 9, 12, 36, 44, 50, 55	1926–1953	1927, 1934, 1938	2010
Bill Parcells	Linebacker Coach/Defensive Coordinator/Head Coach	—	1979, 1981–1990	1986, 1990	2010
Jimmy Patton	S	20	1955–1966	1956	2022
Andy Robustelli	DE	81, 84	1956–1964	1956	2010
Phil Simms	QB	11	1979–1993	1986, 1990	2010
Chris Snee	OG	76	2004–2013	2007, 2011	2015
Michael Strahan	DE	92	1993–2007	2007	2010
Ken Strong	HB	50	1933–1935; 1939, 1944–1947	1934	2010
Lawrence Taylor	LB	56	1981–1993	1986, 1990	2010
Bob Tisch	Owner	—	1991–2005	—	2010
Kyle Rote	HB/WR	44	1951–1961	1956	2022
Y. A. Tittle	QB	14	1961–1964	—	2010
Amani Toomer	WR	81	1996–2008	2007	2010
Justin Tuck	DE	91	2005–2013	2007, 2011	2016
Emlen Tunnell	S Scout and assistant head coach	45	1948–1958; 1963–1973	1956	2010
Osi Umenyiora	DE	72	2003–2012	2007, 2011	2015
Brad Van Pelt	LB	10	1973–1983	—	2011
Alex Webster	FB; Head Coach	29	1955–1964; 1969–1973	1956	2011
George Young	Executive	—	1979–1997	1986, 1990	2010

=== Top 100 greatest Giants of all-time ===
In celebration of the Giants 100th season, the team announced the top 100 players in franchise history.

100 greatest Giants
No.	Player	Pos	Tenure
1	Lawrence Taylor	LB	1981–1993
2	Rosey Brown	OT	1953–1965
3	Mel Hein	C/LB	1931–1945
4	Frank Gifford	HB/FL	1952–1960, 1962–1964
5	Michael Strahan	DE	1993–2007
6	Emlen Tunnell	S/RS	1948–1958
7	Harry Carson	LB	1976–1988
8	Eli Manning	QB	2004–2019
9	Sam Huff	LB	1956–1963
10	Andy Robustelli	DE	1956–1964
11	Phil Simms	QB	1979–1993
12	Y. A. Tittle	QB	1961–1964
13	Charlie Conerly	QB	1948–1961
14	Tiki Barber	RB	1997–2006
15	Tuffy Leemans	FB	1936–1943
16	Amani Toomer	WR	1996–2008
17	Carl Banks	LB	1984–1992
18	Mark Bavaro	TE	1985–1990
19	Ken Strong	HB	1933–1935, 1939, 1944–1947
20	Jimmy Patton	S	1955–1966
21	Arnie Weinmeister	DT	1950–1953
22	Jim Katcavage	DT	1956–1968
23	Del Shofner	E	1961–1967
24	Kyle Rote	E	1951–1961
25	George Martin	DE	1975–1988
26	Leonard Marshall	DE	1983–1992
27	Homer Jones	WR	1964–1969
28	Brad Van Pelt	LB	1973–1983
29	Joe Morrison	RB/WR	1959–1972
30	Justin Tuck	DE	2005–2013
31	Chris Snee	G	2004–2013
32	Osi Umenyiora	DE	2003–2012
33	Fran Tarkenton	QB	1967–1971
34	Jessie Armstead	LB	1993–2001
35	Rosey Grier	DT	1955–1962
36	Benny Friedman	QB	1929–1931
37	Odell Beckham Jr.	WR	2014–2018, 2026
38	Joe Morris	RB	1982–1989
39	Alex Webster	HB	1955–1964
40	Dick Lynch	CB	1959–1966
41	Bart Oates	C	1985–1993
42	Pete Gogolak	K	1966–1974
43	Bob Tucker	TE	1970–1977
44	Jack Stroud	G	1953–1964
45	Rodney Hampton	RB	1990–1997
46	Plaxico Burress	WR	2005–2008
47	Sean Landeta	P	1985–1993, 2006
48	Jeremy Shockey	TE	2002–2007
49	Spider Lockhart	S	1965–1975
50	Ray Flaherty	E	1929, 1931–1935
51	Ottis Anderson	RB	1986–1992
52	David Diehl	OT	2003–2013
53	Dave Jennings	P	1974–1984
54	Steve Owen	HC (Note: Owen also played for the Giants as a tackle from 1926 to 1931, and 1933.)	1930–1953
55	Tom Landry	S/P (Note: Landry also served as the Giants defensive coordinator from 1954 to 1959.)	1950–1955
56	Mark Collins	CB	1986–1993
57	Ward Cuff	HB	1937–1945
58	Ray Wietecha	C	1953–1962
59	Victor Cruz	WR	2010–2016
60	Jumbo Elliott	OT	1988–1996
61	Jason Pierre-Paul	DE	2010–2017
62	Greg Larson	C	1961–1973
63	Dick Modzelewski	DT	1956–1963
64	Jim Burt	DT	1981–1988
65	Shaun O'Hara	C	2004–2010
66	Cal Hubbard	T	1927–1928, 1936
67	Brian Kelley	LB	1973–1983
68	Keith Hamilton	DT	1992–2003
69	Brandon Jacobs	RB	2005–2011, 2013
70	Red Badgro	E	1930–1935
71	Antonio Pierce	LB	2005–2009
72	Ron Johnson	RB	1970–1975
73	Don Chandler	P/K	1956–1964
74	Jack Gregory	DE	1972–1978
75	Pepper Johnson	LB	1986–1992
76	Gary Reasons	LB	1984–1991
77	John Mendenhall	DT	1972–1979
78	Mark Haynes	CB	1980–1985
79	Jeff Hostetler	QB	1984–1992
80	William Roberts	G	1984–1994
81	Frank Cope	T	1938–1947
82	Kareem McKenzie	OT	2005–2012
83	Kerry Collins	QB	1999–2003
84	Ahmad Bradshaw	RB	2007–2012
85	Dave Meggett	RB/RS	1989–1994
86	Erich Barnes	CB	1961–1964
87	Corey Webster	CB	2005–2013
88	Howard Cross	TE	1989–2001
89	Jason Sehorn	CB	1994–2002
90	Aaron Thomas	TE	1962–1970
91	Lawrence Tynes	K	2007–2012
92	Darrell Dess	G	1959–1964; 1966–1969
93	Terry Kinard	S	1983–1989
94	Erik Howard	DT	1986–1994
95	Saquon Barkley	RB	2018–2023
96	Willie Williams	CB	1965, 1967–1973
97	Hakeem Nicks	WR	2009–2013, 2015
98	Eddie Price	FB	1950–1955
99	Brad Benson	OT	1977–1987
100	Rich Seubert	G	2001–2010

=== NFL MVP award winners ===
The Giants have had six players win NFL MVP in franchise history.

Giants NFL MVP winners
Year	Player	Position	Selector
1938	Mel Hein	C, LB	NFL
1956	Frank Gifford	HB, WR	NEA, UPI
1959	Charlie Conerly	QB	NEA
1961	Y. A. Tittle	QB	NEA
1962	Y. A. Tittle	QB	UPI
1963	Y. A. Tittle	QB	AP, NEA
1986	Lawrence Taylor	LB	AP, PFWA
1986	Phil Simms	QB	NEA

=== Super Bowl MVP award winners ===
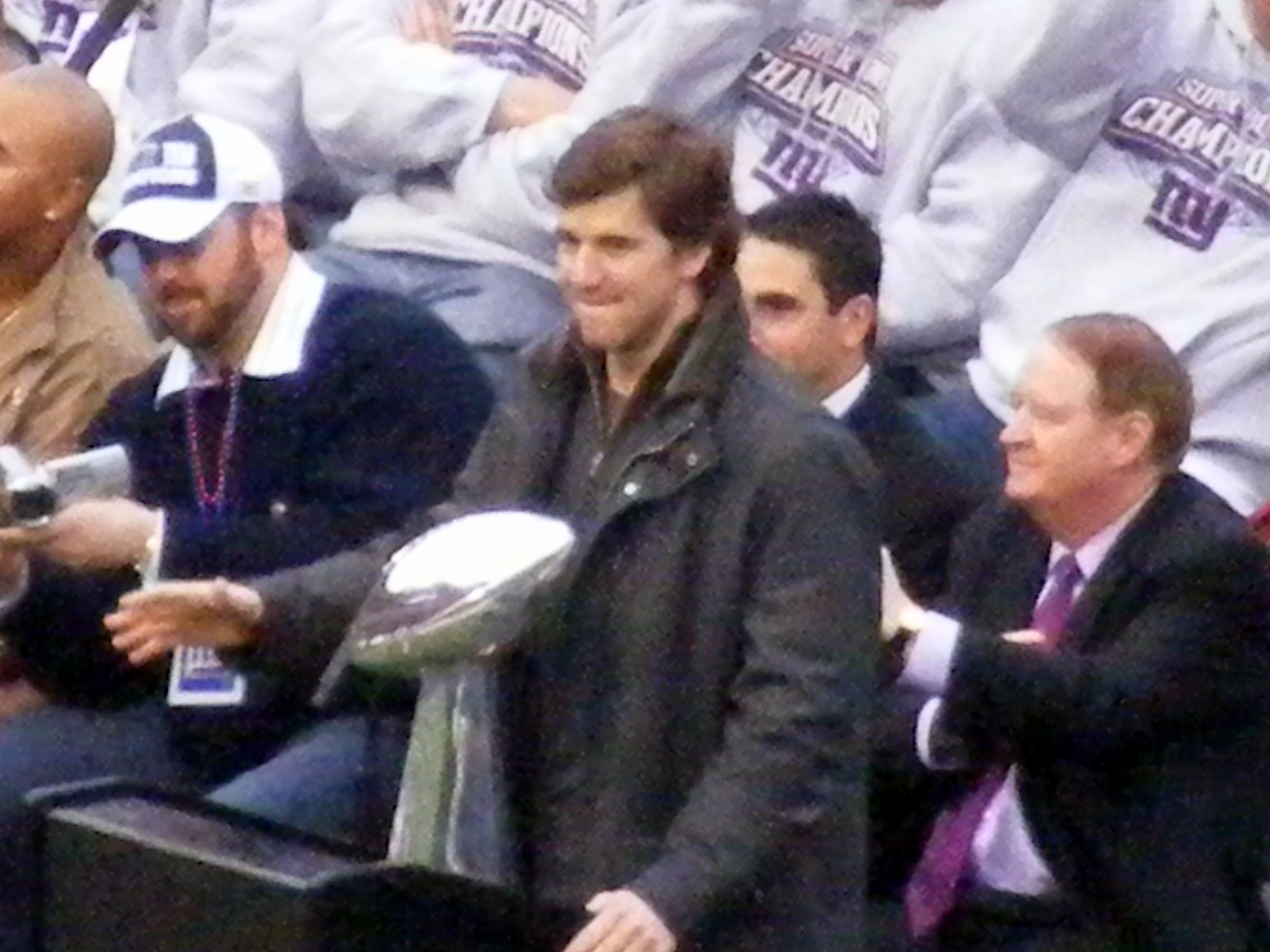
Manning with the Lombardi Trophy during the Giants Super Bowl victory rally at Giants Stadium in 2008.

The Giants have had three players win Super Bowl MVP in franchise history.

Super Bowl MVP winners
Super Bowl	Player	Position
XXI	Phil Simms	QB
XXV	Ottis Anderson	RB
XLII	Eli Manning	QB
XLVI	Eli Manning	QB

=== First-round draft picks ===
The Giants have had the number one overall pick in the NFL draft two times in their history.

== Coaches ==
The Giants have had 22 head coaches serve in the capacity.

=== Current staff ===
New York Giants staff
Front office: President/CEO – John Mara; Chairman/executive vice president – Steve Tisch; Senior vice president of football operations and strategy – Dawn Aponte; Senior vice president & general manager – Joe Schoen; Assistant general manager – Brandon Brown; Senior personnel executive – Dennis Hickey; Senior player personnel executive – Chris Mara; Director of player personnel – Tim McDonnell; Director of college scouting – John Ritcher; Director of pro scouting – Chris Rosetti; Assistant director of pro scouting – Nick La Testa; Director of football operations – Ed Triggs; Director of football data and innovation – Tyseer Siam; Head coaches: Head coach – John Harbaugh; Assistant head coach/special teams coordinator – Chris Horton; Offensive coaches: Offensive coordinator – Matt Nagy; Quarterbacks/pass game coordinator – Brian Callahan; Running backs – Willie Taggart; Wide receivers – Chad Hall; Tight ends – Tim Kelly; Offensive line – Mike Bloomgren; Assistant offensive line – Grant Newsome; Senior offensive assistant – Greg Roman; Offensive quality control – Adam Schrack; Offensive quality control – Mike Snyder; Football analyst/quality control – Noah Riley	Defensive coaches: Defensive coordinator – Dennard Wilson; Defensive line – Dennis Johnson; Outside linebackers/run game coordinator – Charlie Bullen; Inside linebackers – Frank Bush; Assistant linebackers – Matt Pees; Secondary/pass game coordinator – Donald D'Alesio; Defensive backs – Addison Lynch; Defensive quality control – Brendan Clark; Assistant to the head coach/defensive assistant – Megan Rosburg; Special teams coaches: Assistant special teams – T. J. Weist; Football analysts: Football analyst – Bonner Bordelon; Football analyst – Taylor Kolste; Football analyst – Kyrell Michael; Football analyst – Skyler Mornhinweg; Football analyst – Patrick Moynahan; Strength and performance: Executive director of player performance – Aaron Wellman; Director of high performance – Sam Rosengarten; Director of strength and conditioning – Ron Shrift; Assistant director of strength and conditioning – Drew Wilson; Performance manager/assistant strength and conditioning – Sam Coad; Assistant strength and conditioning – Chris Allen; Assistant strength and conditioning – Mark Naylor; Assistant strength – Brian Ellis; Director of performance nutrition – Matthew Frakes; → Coaching staff → Front office → More NFL staffs

== Stat leaders ==
Bold denotes still active with team

Italics denote still active but not with team

These lists are accurate through the 2024 regular season.

=== Passing leaders ===
**Top 5 career**
**Name**	**Yards**	**Tenure**
Eli Manning	57,023	2004–2019
Phil Simms	33,462	1979–1993
Charlie Conerly	19,488	1948–1961
Kerry Collins	16,875	1999–2003
Daniel Jones	14,582	2019–2024

=== Rushing leaders ===
**Top 5 career**
**Name**	**Yards**	**Tenure**
Tiki Barber	10,449	1997–2006
Rodney Hampton	6,897	1990–1997
Joe Morris	5,296	1982–1988
Saquon Barkley	5,211	2018–2023
Brandon Jacobs	5,087	2005–2013

=== Receiving leaders ===
**Top 5 career**
**Name**	**Yards**	**Tenure**
Amani Toomer	9,497	1996–2008
Odell Beckham Jr.	5,476	2014–2018
Frank Gifford	5,434	1952–1964
Tiki Barber	5,183	1997–2006
Joe Morrison	4,993	1959–1972

=== Sack leaders ===
**Top 5 career**
**Name**	**Sacks**	**Tenure**
Lawrence Taylor	142	1981–1993
Michael Strahan	141.5	1993–2007
George Martin	96	1975–1988
Jim Katcavage	91.5	1956–1968
Leonard Marshall	79.5	1983–1992

=== Interception leaders ===
**Top 5 career**
**Name**	**Interceptions**	**Tenure**
Emlen Tunnell	74	1948–1958
Jimmy Patton	52	1955–1966
Carl "Spider" Lockhart	41	1965–1975
Dick Lynch	35	1959–1966
Willie Williams	35	1965–1973

== Media, radio and television ==
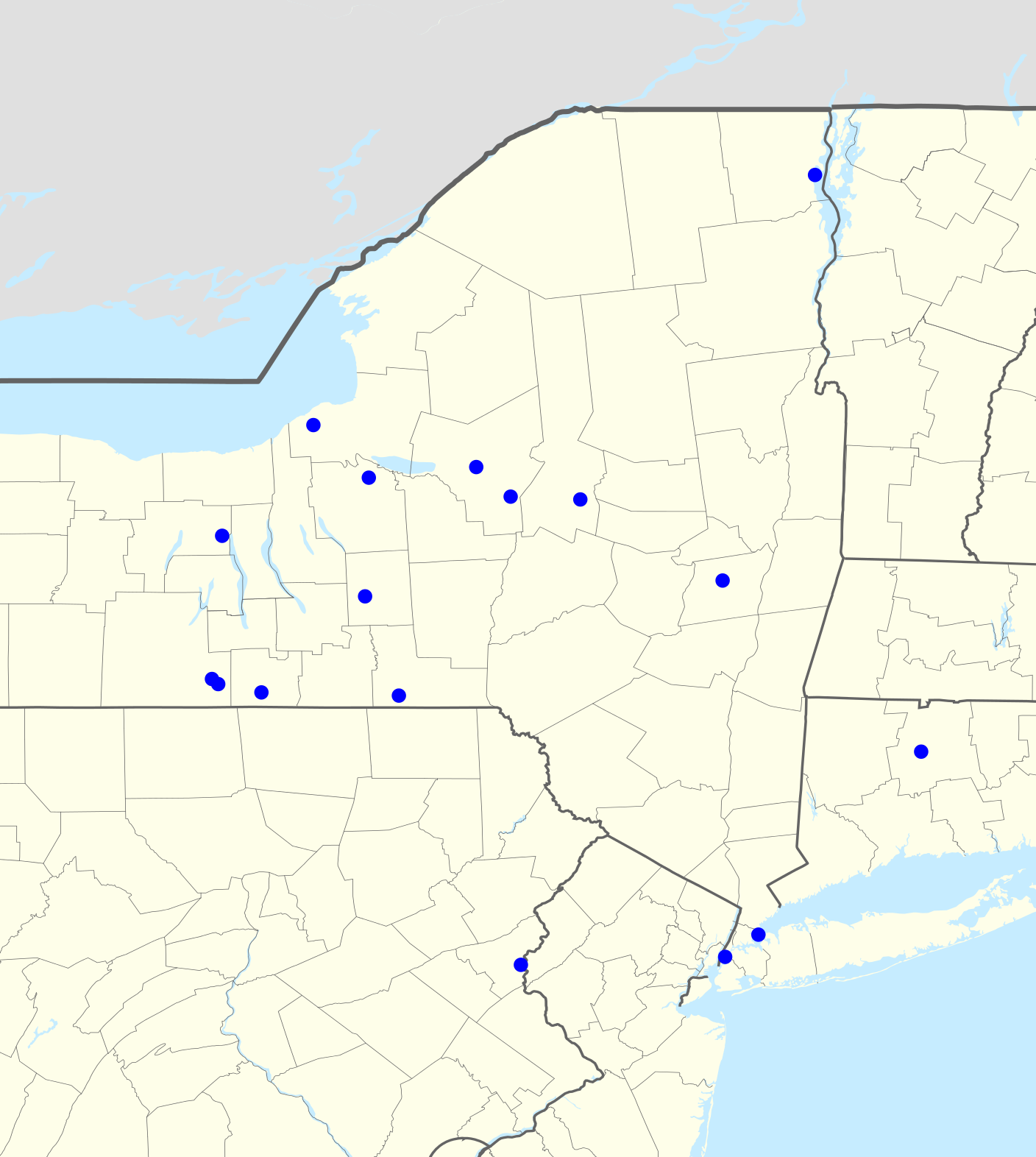
Map of radio affiliates

As of 2010, the Giants' flagship radio station is WFAN, with games simulcast on WFAN-FM as of November 2012. Since WFAN also has the rights to carry baseball, as they currently are the flagship station for the New York Yankees and previously served the same role for the New York Mets, early season Giants games come into conflict; since 2019, WFAN has split the coverage across both of its dial positions, with the Giants carried on 660 AM and the Yankees on 101.9 FM. Prior to that, the Giants' games would air on one of WFAN's designated overflow stations.

Bob Papa on play-by-play and Carl Banks on color commentary are the Giants' radio broadcast team, with Howard Cross as the sideline reporter. When Papa is unavailable to call games Chris Carrino, WFAN's lead broadcaster for the Brooklyn Nets, substitutes for him. Games are carried over the New York Giants Radio Network over various stations in New York, Pennsylvania, and Connecticut.

Preseason telecasts not seen nationally air in the area on WNBC, with WWOR-TV serving as an overflow station for when WNBC is airing other programming such as the Summer Olympic Games. Papa and Banks call these games on television, with studio host Paul Dottino as Papa's substitute.

WPIX-TV or WABC-TV will also air any Giants broadcast that is carried exclusively by ESPN, as per the local carriage rules (WABC-TV's corporate parent, The Walt Disney Company, holds an 80% majority ownership stake in ESPN, and has a right of first refusal for these telecasts). Thursday Night Football broadcasts, which are streamed on Amazon Prime Video, are simulcast on WNYW.

The Giants' public address announcer at MetLife Stadium is Gordon Deal. Deal replaced Jim Hall, who for years was Bob Sheppard's substitute at Yankee Stadium due to their very similar voices. Hall took over the Giants PA job after Sheppard elected to leave the position in 2005 to focus solely on his Yankee Stadium duties.

=== Past ===
WFAN has produced the Giants' radio broadcasts since 1995, but has not always aired them on the station. For 1995, then-Giants flagship WOR continued to carry the games as they had for the previous two seasons. In 1996 the games were simulcast on WFAN and WOR, which caused some conflict as at the time, WFAN was the radio flagship of the New York Jets as well. To remedy the situation, beginning the next year WFAN moved the Giants' radio broadcasts to the FM dial and sister station WNEW-FM, where they remained until the end of the 1999 season. In 2000 WFAN lost the Jets' radio contract to WABC and the Giants moved back to WFAN where they have been ever since.

The Giants' longtime radio home was WNEW, where games aired from the mid-1950s until 1993 when the station was bought by Bloomberg L.P. and changed its format. Marty Glickman teamed with Al DeRogatis for a long stretch beginning in the early 1960s on WNEW. Chip Cipolla and later Sam Huff joined Glickman after DeRogatis left to join Curt Gowdy on NBC. After the WNEW split, games began airing on WOR. Glickman moved to the crosstown Jets in 1973 and was succeeded by Marv Albert. Jim Gordon succeeded Albert in 1977, beginning an 18-year tenure as the Giants' play-by-play voice. Meanwhile, Dick Lynch took over as color analyst in 1976 and continued in that role through 2007, with his last game being Super Bowl XLII, and retired following the season due to his advancing leukemia, which took his life in September 2008.

Eventually Gordon and Lynch were joined by Karl Nelson, a former lineman for the Giants. Gordon and Nelson were fired after the 1994 season, after which Papa took over the play-by-play (after being studio host) and led a two-man booth with Lynch. Dave Jennings joined the broadcast team in 2002 following his firing by the Jets, with whom he had worked since his 1987 retirement from the NFL. Jennings was moved to the pregame show after the 2006 season and was replaced by Carl Banks, leaving broadcasting altogether in 2008 due to his ongoing battle with Parkinson's disease that he lost in 2013.

After WFAN began airing games Richard Neer served as pregame and postgame host. He was replaced by Sid Rosenberg, who was in turn fired by the station due to troubles and replaced by Chris Carlin. Carlin left in 2008 to focus full-time on his duties as SNY studio host and Rutgers athletics radio voice and was replaced by WWOR sports reporter and former WFAN host Russ Salzberg, who cohosted with Roman Oben after Jennings left. WEPN Giants beat reporter Paul Dottino was hired by WFAN to host the pregame show for 2009 and continues to be a part of the program. As of the 2020 season, Lance Medow is the host for the pregame show as well as halftime and postgame, with former Giants punter Jeff Feagles as analyst.

The Giants were carried on the DuMont Network, then CBS in the early TV days of the NFL, when home games were blacked out within a 75-mile (120.7 km) radius of New York City. Chris Schenkel was their play-by-play announcer in that early era when each team was assigned its own network voice on its regional telecasts. At the time, there were few if any true national telecasts until the NFL championship game, which was carried by NBC. Schenkel was joined by Jim McKay, later Johnny Lujack through the 1950s and the early 1960s. As Giants players retired to the broadcast booth in the early and 1960s, first Pat Summerall, then Frank Gifford took the color analyst slot next to Schenkel. As the 1970 merger of the NFL and AFL approached, CBS moved to a more generic announcer approach and Schenkel was off the broadcasts.

Giants regular season Sunday telecasts moved to Fox when that network took over NFC telecasts in 1994 and are carried locally by WNYW.

WCBS-TV and WPIX were previously home to Giants preseason telecasts in the 1990s, with WPIX serving as the Giants' (and Jets') long-time preseason home. After the NFC rights were lost by CBS, the Giants followed the conference's broadcast rights to WNYW. WWOR became the Giants' flagship TV station in the late 1990s, and stayed so up until WNBC took over rights in 2005.

When the Giants first moved to WNYW, Mike Breen was their preseason play-by-play man. Sam Rosen was the television voice for some time afterward, except for two years when Curt Menefee (then of WNYW) was the voice. When the games moved to WWOR, Rosen regained the position and held it until 2004. Former Giant receiver Phil McConkey became the early season analyst after his retirement and stayed in the booth for many years.

== Bibliography ==
- Carroll, John Martin (1999). Grange and the Rise of Modern Football. Urbana: University of Illinois Press. ISBN 978-0-252-07166-9.
- Neft, David S.; Cohen, Richard M.; Korch, Rick (1994). The Complete History of Professional Football from 1892 to the Present. New York: St. Martin's Press. p. 113. ISBN 978-0-312-11435-0.
- Steinbreder, John (1999). Giants: 75 Years of Championship Football (second ed.). Dallas: Taylor Publishing Co. ISBN 978-0-87833-159-8.
- Whittingham, Richard (2005). Illustrated History of the New York Giants. Chicago: Triumph Books. ISBN 978-1-57243-641-1.

Preceded by Frankford Yellow Jackets	NFL champions 1927	Succeeded by Providence Steamrollers (NFL)
Preceded by Chicago Bears	NFL champions 1934	Succeeded by Detroit Lions
Preceded by Washington Redskins	NFL champions 1938	Succeeded by Green Bay Packers
Preceded by Cleveland Browns	NFL champions 1956	Succeeded by Detroit Lions
Preceded by Chicago Bears	Super Bowl champions 1986 (XXI)	Succeeded by Washington Redskins
Preceded by San Francisco 49ers	Super Bowl champions 1990 (XXV)	Succeeded by Washington Redskins
Preceded by Indianapolis Colts	Super Bowl champions 2007 (XLII)	Succeeded by Pittsburgh Steelers
Preceded by Green Bay Packers	Super Bowl champions 2011 (XLVI)	Succeeded by Baltimore Ravens
