= Henry County Schools =

Public school district in Georgia, US

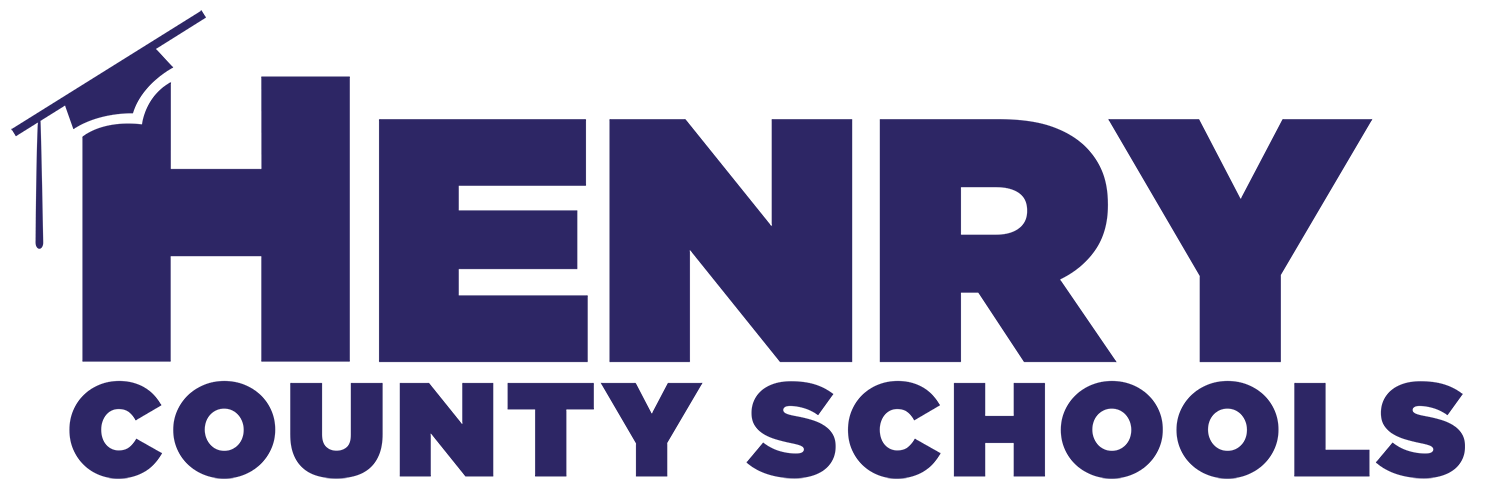

Address
- 33 North Zack Hinton Parkway McDonough, Georgia, 30253; United States
- Coordinates: 33°32′46″N 83°35′02″W

District information
- Grades: PK – 12
- Superintendent: Dr. John Pace
- Accreditation: Cognia
- Schools: 50
- Budget: $449,744,000 (2015-16)

Students and staff
- Enrollment: 42,621 (2018-19)
- Faculty: 2657.20 (on an FTE basis)

Other information
- Website: henry.k12.ga.us

Henry County Schools is a public school district in Henry County, Georgia, United States, based in McDonough. The district covers the entire county, and includes the communities of Blacksville, Flippen, Hampton, Kelleytown, Locust Grove, McDonough, Ola, and Stockbridge.

== Schools ==
=== High schools ===
- Dutchtown High School
- Eagle's Landing High School
- Hampton High School
- Locust Grove High School
- Luella High School
- Ola High School
- Stockbridge High School
- Union Grove High School
- Woodland High School
- McDonough High School

=== Middle schools ===
- Austin Road Middle School
- Dutchtown Middle School
- Eagle's Landing Middle School
- Hampton Middle School
- Locust Grove Middle School
- Luella Middle School
- McDonough Middle School
- Ola Middle School
- Stockbridge Middle School
- Union Grove Middle School
- Woodland Middle School

=== Elementary schools ===
- Austin Road Elementary School
- Bethlehem Elementary School
- Birch Creek Elementary School
- Cotton Indian Elementary School
- Dutchtown Elementary School
- East Lake Elementary School
- Fairview Elementary School
- Flippen Elementary School
- Hampton Elementary School
- Hickory Flat Charter Elementary School
- Locust Grove Elementary School
- Luella Elementary School
- McDonough Elementary School (permanently closed)
- Mount Carmel Elementary School
- New Hope Elementary School
- Oakland Elementary School
- Ola Elementary School
- Pate's Creek Elementary School
- Pleasant Grove Elementary School
- Red Oak Elementary School
- Rocky Creek Elementary School
- Rock Spring Elementary School
- Smith-Barnes Elementary School
- Stockbridge Elementary School
- Timber Ridge Elementary School
- Tussahaw Elementary School
- Unity Grove Elementary School
- Walnut Creek Elementary School
- Wesley Lakes Elementary School
- Woodland Elementary School

=== Other schools ===
- Patrick Henry High School (permanently closed]
- Advanced Academy
- Excel Academy
- Impact Academy
- Community Christian School
- Creekside Christian Academy

And More
