= Patrick Henry High School (Stockbridge, Georgia) =

Public high school in Stockbridge, Georgia, United States

Patrick Henry Alternative High School

Location
- 109 South Lee Street; Stockbridge, Georgia; United States
- 33°32′29″N 84°13′50″W

Information
- Type: Public
- Closed: 2015; demolished 2024
- School district: Henry County Schools
- NCES School ID: 130282000996
- Principal: George Eckerle
- Faculty: 43.00 (on FTE basis)
- Grades: 6 to 12
- Enrollment: 302 (2011–12)
- Student to teacher ratio: 7.02:1
- Website: PHHS website

Patrick Henry High School (PHHS) was located at 109 South Lee Street in Stockbridge, Georgia, United States. Originally Stockbridge High School, it was the alternative high school for the Henry County School System. It was closed after the 2015 school year after the Board of Education made the decision to move the alternative school to a different location in the county. The building was used as a rental space for the filming industry and its adjacent building for professional development meetings. The building began demolition in September 2024, making way for a new Henry County STEM School. Patrick Henry High School was subsequently relocated to the old McDonough Elementary School in McDonough and was renamed Excel Academy.

PHHS stood in as both Hawkins Middle School and Hawkins High School for the filming of the Netflix series Stranger Things (2016–2025), which starred Randy Havens, a former student at the school. It was also used to film McKinney High School in the 2022 miniseries Candy and the middle school scenes in the 2019 film Brightburn.
