= Brenton Cox Jr. =

American football player (born 2000)

No. 57 – Green Bay Packers
- Position: Outside linebacker
- Roster status: Active

Personal information
- Born: January 30, 2000 (age 26); Stockbridge, Georgia, U.S.
- Listed height: 6 ft 4 in (1.93 m)
- Listed weight: 250 lb (113 kg)

Career information
- High school: Stockbridge
- College: Georgia (2018); Florida (2019–2022)
- NFL draft: 2023: undrafted

Career history
- Green Bay Packers (2023–present)

Awards and highlights
- Second-team All-SEC (2020)

Career NFL statistics as of Week 10, 2026
- Total tackles: 43
- Sacks: 6.5
- Forced fumbles: 2
- Fumble recoveries: 2
- Stats at Pro Football Reference

Brenton Alexander Cox Jr. (born January 30, 2000) is an American professional football outside linebacker for the Green Bay Packers of the National Football League (NFL). He played college football for the Georgia Bulldogs and Florida Gators. He entered the 2023 NFL draft and signed with the Packers as an undrafted free agent.

== Early life ==
Cox grew up in Stockbridge, Georgia and attended Miller Grove High School for two years before transferring to Stockbridge High School. As a senior he recorded 42 tackles with 9.5 tackles for loss and five sacks and was named first team All-State and played in the 2018 Under Armour All-America Game.

College recruiting
Name	Hometown	School	Height	Weight	Commit date
Brenton Cox Jr. DE	Stockbridge, Georgia	Stockbridge High School	6 ft 4 in (1.93 m)	247 lb (112 kg)	Dec 20, 2017
Brenton Cox Jr. DE	Recruit ratings: Rivals: 247Sports: ESPN:				
Overall recruit ranking: Rivals: 33 (#2 DE, #5 GA) 247Sports: 60 (#3 DE, #6 GA) ESPN: 11 (#5 DE, #3 GA)
Note: In many cases, Scout, Rivals, 247Sports, On3, and ESPN may conflict in their listings of height and weight.; In these cases, the average was taken. ESPN grades are on a 100-point scale.; Sources: "2018 Team Ranking". Rivals.com.

== College career ==
Cox began his collegiate career at Georgia. He played in 13 games with 20 tackles and one sack as a true freshman. He made his first career start in the 2019 Sugar Bowl, making six tackles. During the summer going into his sophomore year Cox was dismissed from the team. Shortly afterwards, Cox announced that he would be transferring to the University of Florida.

Cox initially applied for a waiver to play immediately for the Florida Gators, but his appeal was denied and he sat out his sophomore season per NCAA transfer rules. Cox was named a starter going into his redshirt sophomore season. Cox was kicked off the Gators football team on October 31, 2022, after a series of incidents with coaches and strength and conditioning staff.

== Professional career ==
Pre-draft measurables
Height	Weight	Arm length	Hand span	Wingspan	40-yard dash	10-yard split	20-yard split	20-yard shuttle	Three-cone drill	Vertical jump	Broad jump	Bench press
6 ft 3 7/8 in (1.93 m)	250 lb (113 kg)	33 1/8 in (0.84 m)	9 1/4 in (0.23 m)	6 ft 8 3/4 in (2.05 m)	4.82 s	1.65 s	2.76 s	4.57 s	7.57 s	33.0 in (0.84 m)	9 ft 7 in (2.92 m)	29 reps
All values from NFL Combine/Pro Day

After going undrafted at the 2023 NFL draft, Cox was signed by the Green Bay Packers on May 1, 2023. On August 29, the Packers announced that he had made the initial 53-man roster.

Cox played four defensive snaps and nine special teams snaps during his rookie year. On September 11, 2025, Cox was placed on injured reserve. He was activated on December 19, ahead of the team's Week 16 matchup against the Chicago Bears. Cox made four appearances (including one start) for Green Bay, recording one sack and five combined tackles.

On March 11, 2026, Cox re-signed with the Packers.

== NFL career statistics ==
Legend
**Bold**	Career high

=== Regular season ===
Season	Team	GP	GS	Total	Solo	Ast	Sck	FF	FR	PD
2023	GB	4	0	0	0	0	0.0	0	0	0
2024	GB	**7**	0	**12**	**8**	**4**	**4.0**	**1**	0	0
2025	GB	4	**1**	5	2	3	1.0	**1**	0	0
Career		15	1	17	10	7	5.0	2	0	0
Source: pro-football-reference.com

=== Postseason ===
Season	Team	GP	GS	Total	Solo	Ast	Sck	FF	FR	PD
2024	GB	1	0	0	0	0	0.0	0	0	0
2025	GB	1	0	0	0	0	0.0	0	0	0
Career		2	0	0	0	0	0.0	0	0	0
Source: pro-football-reference.com
