= Demetrius Knight =

American football player (born 2000)

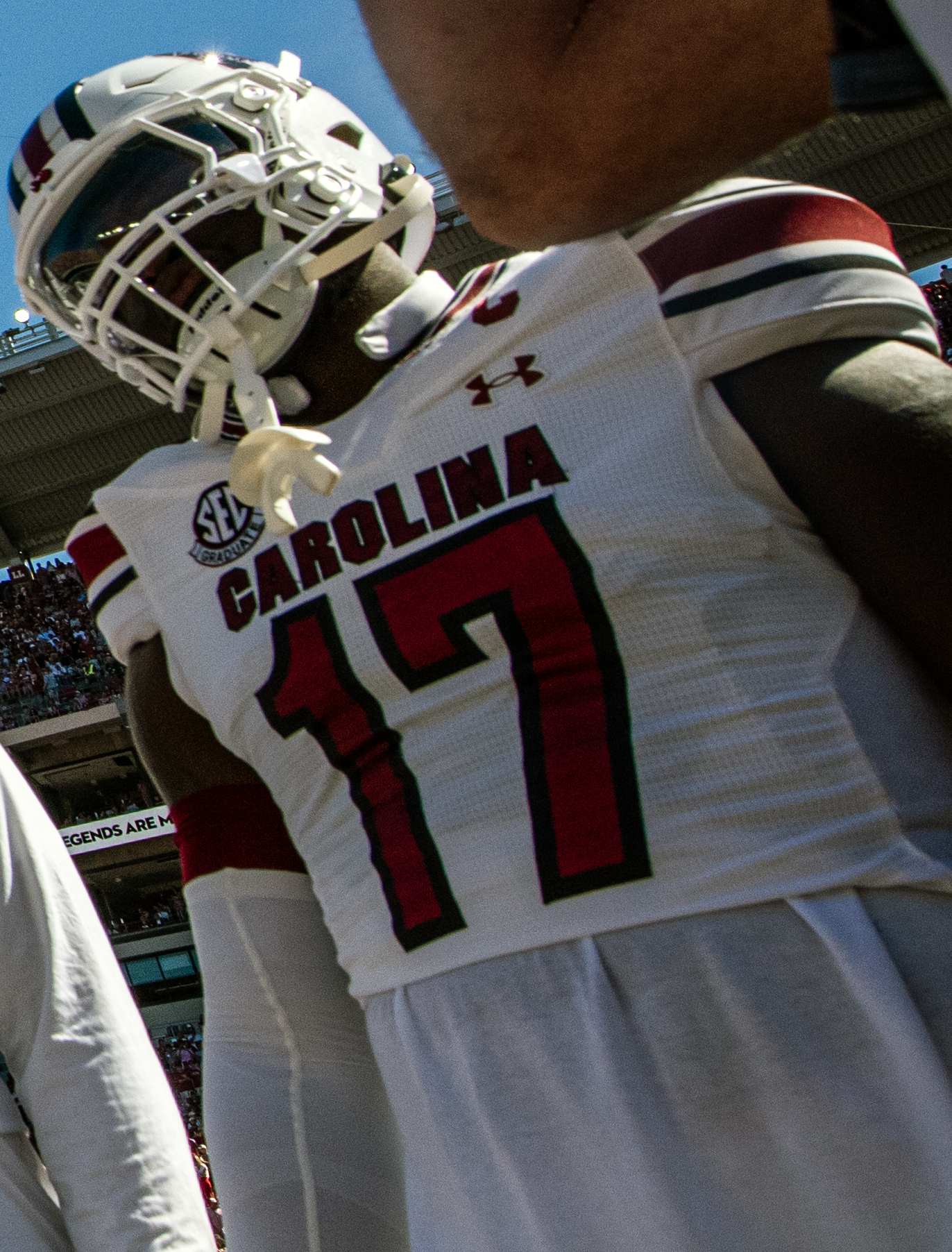
- Knight in 2024

No. 44 – Cincinnati Bengals
- Position: Linebacker
- Roster status: Active

Personal information
- Born: July 21, 2000 (age 26); Locust Grove, Georgia, U.S.
- Listed height: 6 ft 2 in (1.88 m)
- Listed weight: 240 lb (109 kg)

Career information
- High school: Strong Rock Christian (Locust Grove, Georgia)
- College: Georgia Tech (2019–2022); Charlotte (2023); South Carolina (2024)
- NFL draft: 2025: 2nd round, 49th overall pick

Career history
- Cincinnati Bengals (2025–present)

Awards and highlights
- First team All-AAC (2023)

Career NFL statistics as of Week 5, 2026
- Total tackles: 148
- Sacks: 3
- Forced fumbles: 1
- Fumble recoveries: 1
- Pass deflections: 7
- Interceptions: 2
- Defensive touchdowns: 1
- Stats at Pro Football Reference

Demetrius T. Knight Jr. (born July 21, 2000) is an American professional football linebacker for the Cincinnati Bengals of the National Football League (NFL). He played college football for the South Carolina Gamecocks, Charlotte 49ers and Georgia Tech Yellow Jackets. Knight was selected by the Bengals in the second round of the 2025 NFL draft.

== Early life ==
Knight attended Strong Rock Christian School in Locust Grove, Georgia. Coming out of high school, Knight was unranked, where he committed to play college football for the Georgia Tech Yellow Jackets.

== College career ==
=== Georgia Tech ===
During Knight's four-year career at Georgia Tech from 2019 through 2022, he appeared in 36 games where he notched 51 tackles with three being for a loss, a sack, two pass deflections, two forced fumbles, and a fumble recovery, while also completing one pass for four yards. After the 2022 season, Knight entered his name into the NCAA transfer portal.

=== Charlotte ===
Knight transferred to play for the Charlotte 49ers. In 2023, he notched 96 tackles with six being for a loss, three interceptions, and a touchdown for the 49ers. After one year with Charlotte, Knight once again entered his name into the NCAA transfer portal.

=== South Carolina ===
Knight transferred to play for the South Carolina Gamecocks. In week 10 of the 2024 season, he notched seven tackles in a 28-7 win over Vanderbilt. In the 2024 regular-season finale, Knight intercepted quarterback Cade Klubnik with 12 seconds remaining to help the Gamecocks seal a rivalry win over Clemson.

== Professional career ==
Pre-draft measurables
Height	Weight	Arm length	Hand span	Wingspan	40-yard dash	10-yard split	20-yard split	20-yard shuttle	Three-cone drill	Vertical jump	Broad jump	Bench press
6 ft 1 5/8 in (1.87 m)	235 lb (107 kg)	32 5/8 in (0.83 m)	10 in (0.25 m)	6 ft 8 1/2 in (2.04 m)	4.58 s	1.58 s	2.69 s	4.25 s	7.12 s	31.5 in (0.80 m)	9 ft 10 in (3.00 m)	22 reps
All values from NFL Combine

Knight was selected by the Cincinnati Bengals with the 49th pick in the second round of the 2025 NFL draft.

== NFL career statistics ==
=== Regular season ===
Year	Team	Games		Tackles					Interceptions						Fumbles				
Year	Team	GP	GS	Cmb	Solo	Ast	Sck	TFL	Int	Yds	Avg	Lng	TD	PD	FF	Fum	FR	Yds	TD
2025	CIN	17	14	106	58	48	3.0	4	2	39	19.5	39	0	7	1	0	0	0	0
Career		17	14	106	58	48	3.0	4	2	39	19.5	39	0	7	1	0	0	0	0

== Personal ==
Knight is cousins with former Pro Bowl defensive back DeAngelo Hall and distant cousins with musical superstars Aretha Franklin and Gladys Knight.
