= Dutchtown High School (Georgia) =

Public high school in Hampton, Georgia, United States

Location
- 149 Mitchell Road; Hampton, Henry County, Georgia 30228; United States; 33°28′15″N 84°15′13″W

Information
- Motto: To Educate, Encourage, and Empower
- Established: 2004
- NCES District ID: 1302820
- NCES School ID: 130282003407
- Principal: Nicole Shaw
- Teaching staff: 101.40 (on a FTE basis)
- Grades: 9–12
- Student to teacher ratio: 18.08
- Education system: Henry County School System
- Hours in school day: 8
- Colors: Red, black, and white
- Athletics: Football, basketball, softball, baseball, soccer, tennis, golf, cross country running, track and field, swimming
- Mascot: Bulldog
- Team name: Bulldogs
- Rival: Stockbridge High School
- Website: https://dhs.henry.k12.ga.us/

Dutchtown High School is a public high school located in unincorporated Henry County, Georgia, United States, north of Hampton. This school is one of ten high schools operated by the Henry County School District.

== History ==
Dutchtown High School opened in 2004 and is located in the Dutchtown settlement in the old Sixth Militia District of Henry County along Jonesboro Road. The school is accredited by the Georgia Accrediting Commission and the Association of Colleges and Schools. The school's mascot is the bulldog.

== Overview ==
The school offers Advanced Placement courses and examinations, with a 26 percent participation rate in the program among students. As of 2018, it does not have a ranking in U.S. News & World Report's ranking of high schools in the United States.

== Notable alumni ==
- Will Anderson Jr, NFL player, NFL Defensive Rookie of The Year
- Trey Dean III, Professional football player with DC Defenders United Football League and also played for University of Florida
- Nate McCollum, NFL wide receiver for the Arizona Cardinals
