= Blacksville =

Blacksville may refer to some places in the United States:

- Blacksville, Georgia
- Blacksville, West Virginia
