= Dutchtown High School =

Dutchtown High School may refer to:

- Dutchtown High School (Louisiana)
- Dutchtown High School (Hampton, Georgia)
