= Hampton High School (Georgia) =

Public high school in Hampton, Georgia, United States

Coordinates: 33.380078°N 84.255515°W

Location
- 795 Hampton Locust Grove Rd; Hampton, Georgia 30228; United States

Information
- Type: Public
- Established: 2014
- School district: Henry County Public Schools
- Principal: Jarvis Price
- Staff: 60.40 (FTE)
- Grades: 9–12
- Enrollment: 1,286 (2023–2024)
- Student to teacher ratio: 21.29
- Colors: Purple & gold
- Athletics conference: GHSA Div. 5A
- Mascot: Hornets
- Website: https://hhs.henry.k12.ga.us/

Hampton High School is a public high school located in unincorporated Henry County, Georgia, United States, near Hampton. It is a part of the Henry County Schools school district.

During the 19th Century Hampton was served by its own public high school, with more than 100 students attending in 1886. The school continued in existence throughout the 20th Century.

Construction of a new Hampton High School broke ground on July 9, 2012, and became the 10th high school in Henry County.

== Notable alumni ==
- Daniel Roberts (2016) - professional track and field athlete, 2021 and 2024 Olympian (silver medal)
