= Regina Lewis-Ward =

American politician (born 1959)

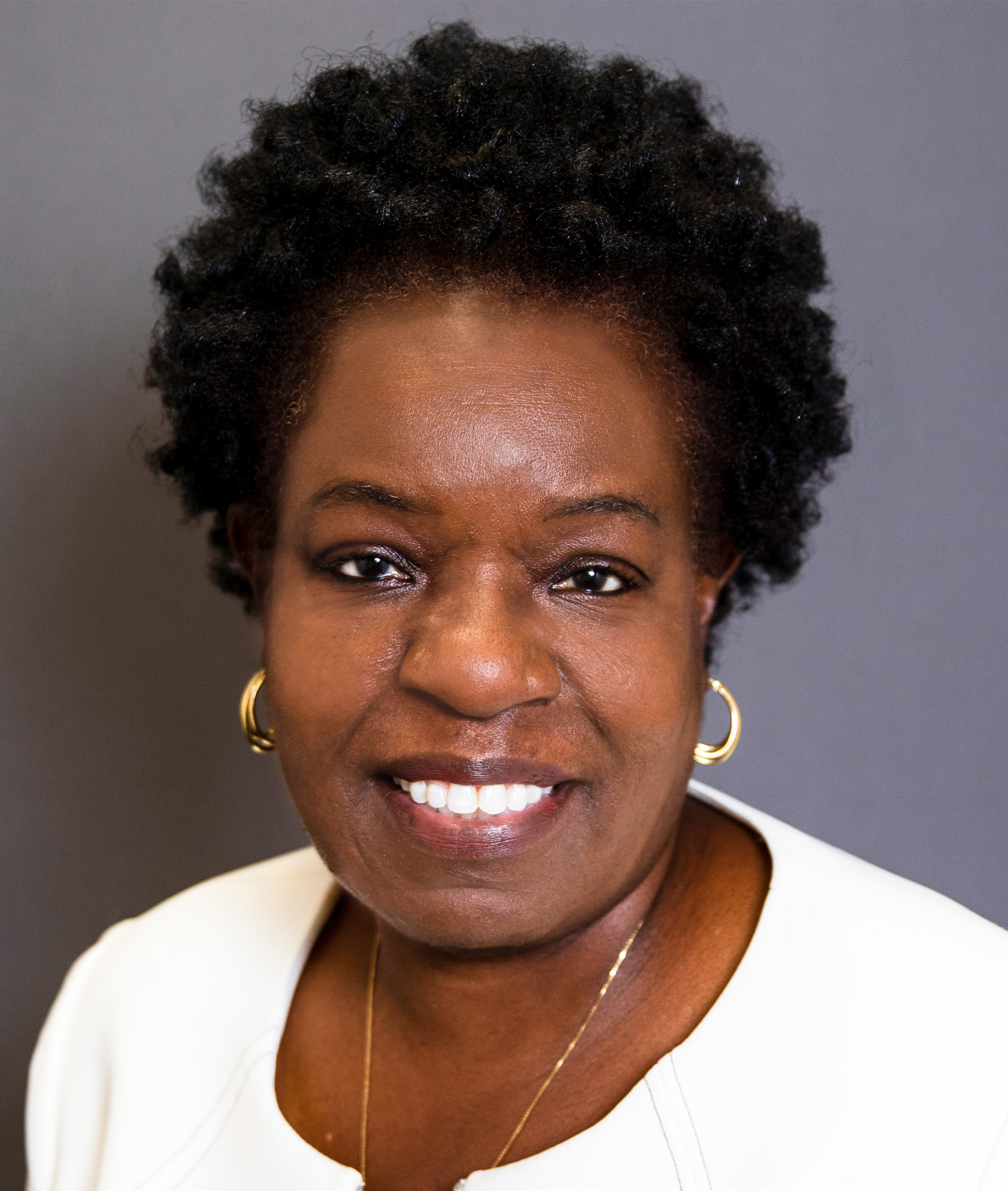

Member of the Georgia House of Representatives
- Incumbent
- Assumed office January 11, 2021
- Preceded by: Dale Rutledge
- Constituency: 109th District (2021–2023); 115th District (2023–Present)

Personal details
- Born: October 4, 1959 (age 66)
- Party: Democratic

Regina D. Lewis-Ward (born October 4, 1959) is an American politician and children's book author from Georgia. Lewis-Ward is a Democratic member of the Georgia House of Representatives from District 115. A native of Brooklyn, New York, Lewis-Ward grew up in New York City Housing Authority and attended public schools.

Representative Lewis-Ward entered public office in 2014 as a councilwoman in Stockbridge, GA advocating for inclusive communities, becoming the first politician from Stockbridge to respond to segregated playgrounds. Lewis-Ward's commitment to unite families and children of all abilities led to inclusive play at Stockbridge Memorial and Clark Parks with adaptive playground equipment. Lewis-Ward started the first Stockbridge Citizens Academy to offer citizen engagement with their local government. In 2016, Lewis-Ward made a run for Mayor of Stockbridge. From a field of four candidates, she received the most votes in the history of Stockbridge municipal elections (38.9% or 3,760 votes). She lost the run-off election by 142 votes to Judy B Neal.

As the 2018 and 2020 Democratic nominee for Georgia State House, District 109, Lewis-Ward became the first African American woman to receive the nomination by a major U.S. political party. Her 2020 victory against Republican Dale Rutledge marked a historic win as the only African American woman in the United States to unseat a male Republican incumbent during the 2020 elections. During her first session as a lawmaker, Representative Lewis-Ward co-authored, HB 676 bipartisan legislation, that was signed into law, effective May 4, 2021.

Fair Fight Action appointed Representative Lewis-Ward as a senior fellow to promote fair elections, encourage participation, and educate voters about elections and voting rights. Lewis-Ward is the chairwoman of the Democratic Party of Georgia Henry County Committee and serves on the state of Georgia Agriculture & Consumer Affairs, Banks & Banking, and Interstate Cooperation committees.

Representative Lewis-Ward earned a Bachelor of Business Administration in computer systems, from Bernard M. Baruch College, New York, and a Master of Art, in political science, from Clayton State University, Georgia. She wrote her graduate thesis on the United States Federal Government and Lags in Protecting Personally Identifiable Information. Lewis-Ward is a political science adjunct professor, who has taught Political Thought, Public Administration, & Intro to Government and Politics to students at Rasmussen College and Georgia Military College.

Georgia House of Representatives
Preceded by Dale Rutledge	Member of the Georgia House of Representatives from the 109th district 2021–2023	Succeeded by Dewey McClain
Preceded by Bruce Williamson	Member of the Georgia House of Representatives from the 115th district 2023–Present	Incumbent
