= Nate McCollum =

American football player (born 2001)

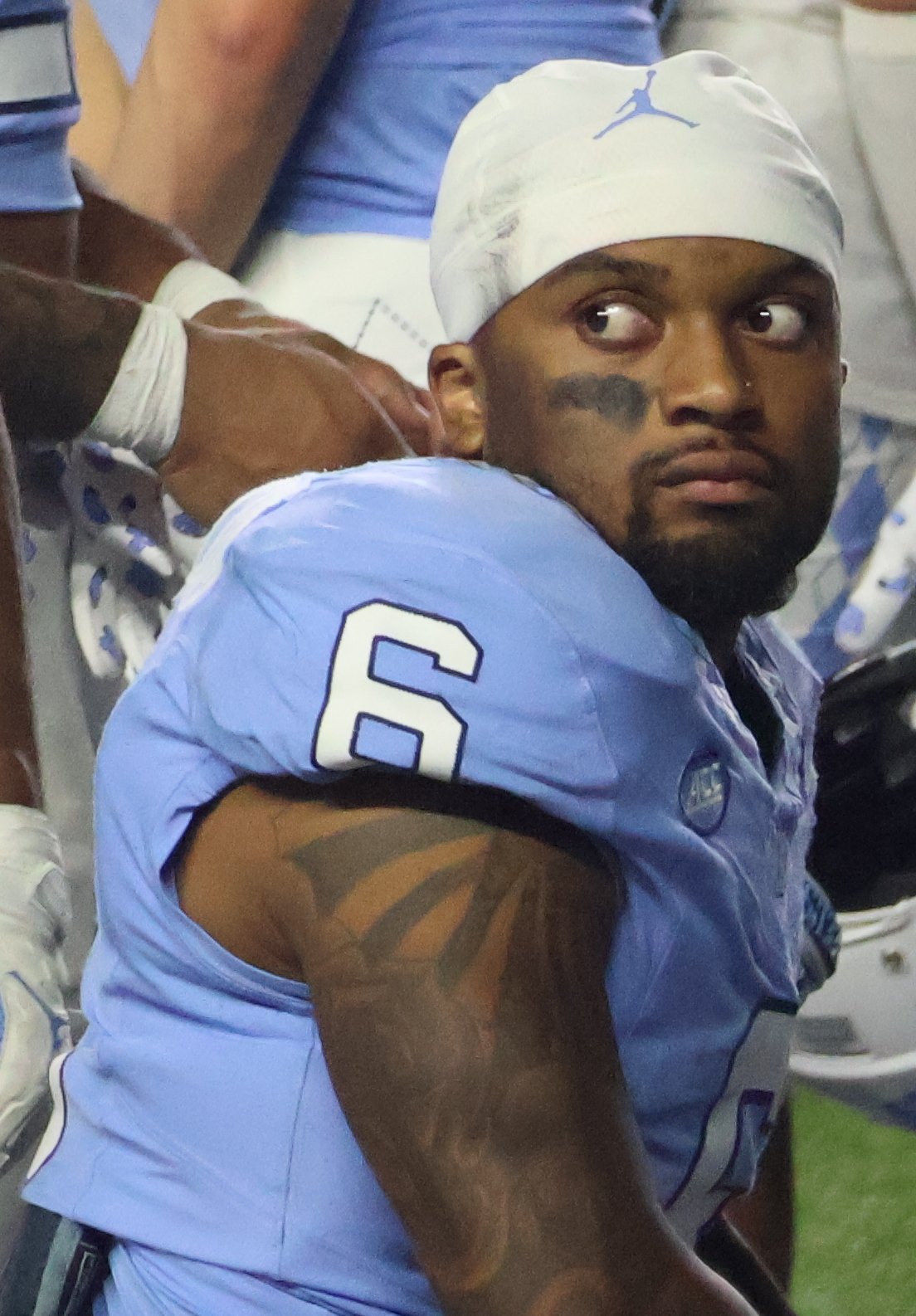
- McCollum with the North Carolina Tar Heels in 2024

Profile
- Position: Wide receiver

Personal information
- Born: December 6, 2001 (age 24); Atlanta, Georgia, U.S.
- Listed height: 5 ft 9 in (1.75 m)
- Listed weight: 187 lb (85 kg)

Career information
- High school: Dutchtown (Hampton, Georgia)
- College: Georgia Tech (2020–2022); North Carolina (2023–2024)
- NFL draft: 2025: undrafted

Career history
- New York Giants (2025)*; Seattle Seahawks (2025)*; Arizona Cardinals (2025)*
- * Offseason or practice squad member only

Nate McCollum (born December 6, 2001) is an American professional football wide receiver. He previously played college football for the Georgia Tech Yellow Jackets and for the North Carolina Tar Heels.

== Early life ==
McCollum attended high school at Dutchtown located in Hampton, Georgia. Coming out of high school, he was rated as a three star recruit, where he committed to play college football for the Georgia Tech Yellow Jackets.

== College career ==
=== Georgia Tech ===
McCollum finished his freshman season in 2020, bringing in two receptions for 15 yards. During the 2021 season, he recorded 13 receptions for 108 yards and a touchdown in 12 games. In week ten of the 2022 season, McCollum tallied five receptions for 41 yards against Florida State. In week eleven, he racked up 103 yards in a victory versus Virginia Tech. McCollum finished his breakout season in 2022, hauling in 60 passes for 655 yards and three touchdowns. After the conclusion of the 2022 season, he decided to enter his name into the NCAA transfer portal.

=== North Carolina ===
McCollum transferred to play for the North Carolina Tar Heels. In week three of the 2023 season, he had a career performance hauling in 15 receptions for 165 yards and a touchdown against Minnesota. He finished his two year career at North Carolina from 2023 through 2024, appearing in 20 games, totaling 68 receptions for 743 yards and a touchdown, while adding a 40 yards on the ground, and returning 17 kickoffs for 448 yards, where after the conclusion of the 2024 season, he declared for the 2025 NFL draft.

== Professional career ==
Pre-draft measurables
Height	Weight	Arm length	Hand span	40-yard dash	10-yard split	20-yard split	20-yard shuttle	Three-cone drill	Vertical jump	Broad jump	Bench press
5 ft 8 in (1.73 m)	184 lb (83 kg)	28 7/8 in (0.73 m)	9 3/8 in (0.24 m)	4.45 s	1.47 s	2.56 s	4.07 s	6.95 s	33.0 in (0.84 m)	9 ft 5 in (2.87 m)	16 reps
All values from Pro Day

=== New York Giants ===
After not being selected in the 2025 NFL draft, McCollum signed with the New York Giants as an undrafted free agent. However, shortly after signing, he was released by the Giants.

=== Seattle Seahawks ===
On May 20, 2025, McCollum signed with the Seattle Seahawks. On July 4, McCollum was released by the Seahawks.

=== Arizona Cardinals ===
On August 3, 2025, McCollum signed with the Arizona Cardinals. He was waived on August 25.
