= Dale Rutledge =

American politician

Member of the Georgia House of Representatives from the 109th district
- In office January 14, 2013 – January 11, 2021
- Succeeded by: Regina Lewis-Ward

Personal details
- Born: Henry County, Georgia, U.S.
- Party: Republican
- Education: Georgia Southwestern State University

Dale Roger Rutledge is an American politician who served in the Georgia House of Representatives.

== Early life ==
Rutledge was born in Henry County, Georgia. Rutledge grew up on a family farm.

== Education ==
Rutledge attended Georgia Southwestern University.

== Career ==
Rutledge is a businessman. In 1999, Rutledge became the owner and President of Expo-Link Cargo, a company in the trade show business for logistic industry.

In 2012, Rutledge's political career began when he was first elected as the Georgia House of Representatives for district 109. Rutledge defeated Republican incumbent Steve Davis.

In 2013, Rutledge became the Vice President of J&P Hall Express.

In 2020, Rutledge was defeated in his reelection attempt for District 109.

== Personal life ==
Dale has two daughters; Caroline & Morgan and one son Grant. He also has five grandchildren.
