= Dewey McClain =

American politician from Georgia

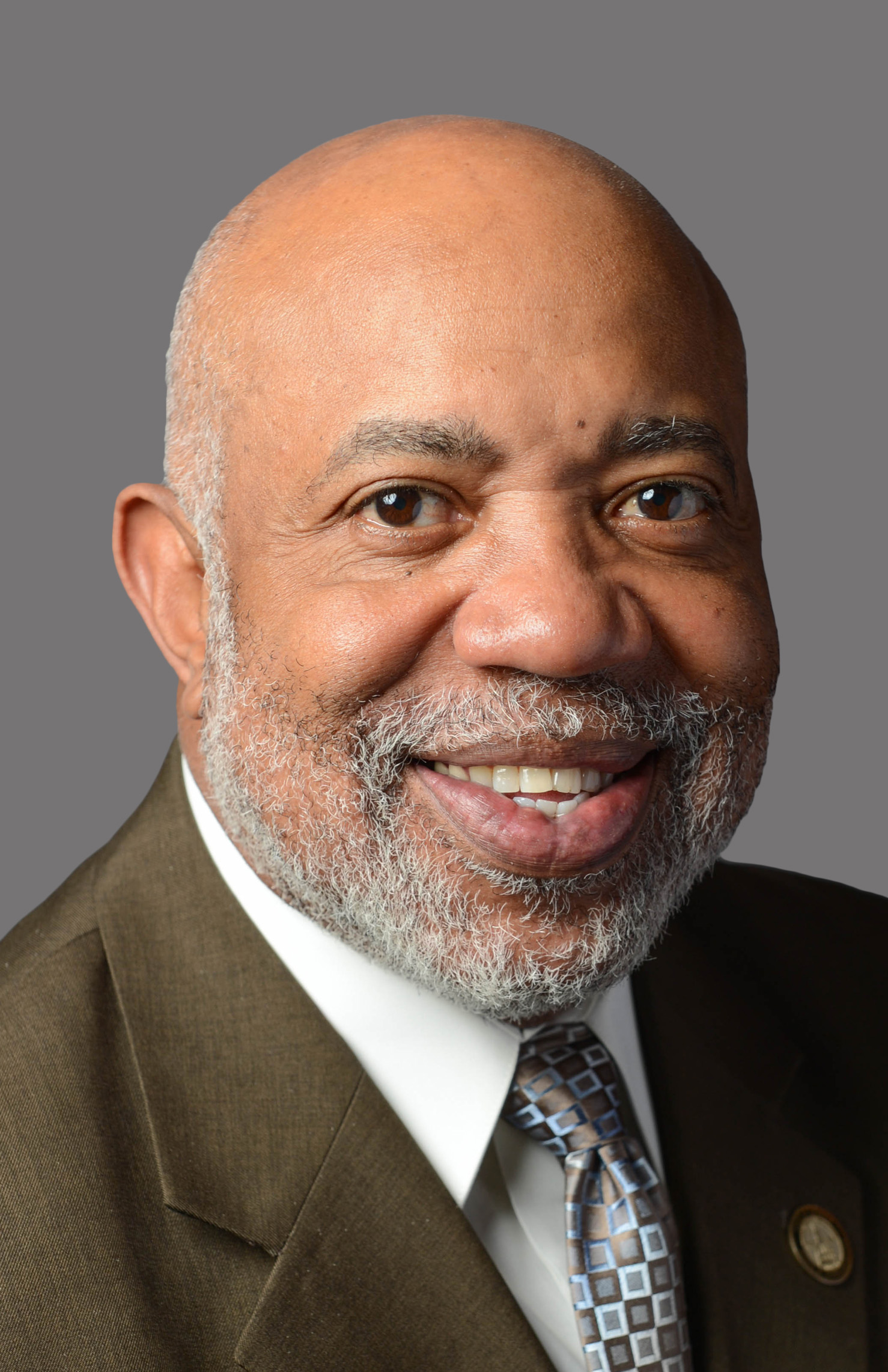

Member of the Georgia House of Representatives
- Incumbent
- Assumed office December 5, 2013
- Preceded by: Brian Thomas
- Constituency: 100th District (2013–2023); 109th District (2023–Present)

Personal details
- Born: April 25, 1954 (age 72) Okmulgee, Oklahoma, U.S.
- Party: Democratic
- Spouse: Linda Evans
- Children: 2
- Football career

No. 52
- Position: Linebacker

Personal information
- Listed height: 6 ft 3 in (1.91 m)
- Listed weight: 236 lb (107 kg)

Career information
- High school: Okmulgee High School
- College: East Central
- NFL draft: 1976: undrafted

Career history
- Atlanta Falcons (1976–1980); Oakland Invaders (1983); Oklahoma Outlaws (1984)
- Stats at Pro Football Reference

Dewey Loren McClain (born April 25, 1954) is an American former professional football player, labor leader, and politician. A member of the Democratic Party, McClain serves in the Georgia House of Representatives, representing the 109th district.

McClain played for the Atlanta Falcons of the National Football League from 1976 through 1980. He returned to football, playing in the United States Football League for the Oakland Invaders in 1983 and the Oklahoma Outlaws in 1984. After he retired from football, he became a labor leader, serving in the National Football League Players Association and as president of the Atlanta North Georgia Labor Council. He was elected to the Georgia House in a special election held on November 5, 2013.

== American football career ==
McClain is from Okmulgee, Oklahoma, and attended Okmulgee High School. He then enrolled East Central State University, where he played college football for the East Central Tigers. He graduated in 1976 with a Bachelor of Arts in history, with minor concentrations in psychology, sociology, government, and physical education. He signed with the Atlanta Falcons as a free agent, and played for Atlanta as a linebacker from 1976 through 1980. Before the 1981 season, the Falcons traded McClain to the Green Bay Packers with Frank Reed for Steve Luke and a draft pick, but he became injured in training camp and did not play for the Packers.

After sitting out a year, McClain returned to football, playing for the Oakland Invaders of the United States Football League in 1983. When he discovered that Tulsa was receiving a USFL expansion franchise in 1984, the Oklahoma Outlaws, McClain asked to be made available in the expansion draft so that he could play for them, insisting that he would otherwise retire. He exposed in the expansion draft, but selected by the Memphis Showboats. He held out, refusing to report to Memphis. When training camp opened and McClain did not report, the Showboats agreed to trade McClain to Oklahoma for the rights to Horace Ivory. He played for the Outlaws in 1984, before retiring.

McClain was a founding member and president of the Metro Atlanta chapter of the National Football League Players Association (NFLPA). He served as a member of the National Former Players Board of Directors of the NFLPA.

== Government career ==
After he retired from football, McClain went to work for the city of Atlanta. He worked in the Department of Parks, Recreation and Cultural Affairs for 18 years, and for the Atlanta Workforce Development Agency for four years. In 2013, McClain became the president of the Atlanta North Georgia Labor Council, an affiliate of the AFL–CIO.

McClain ran in a special election for the Georgia House of Representatives, to serve the 100th district, which took place on November 5, 2013. He was the only candidate on the ballot, and won the race uncontested. He was sworn into office on December 5.

== Personal life ==
McClain lives in Lilburn, Georgia. He met his wife, Linda (née Evans), in high school. The couple have two daughters.

Georgia House of Representatives
Preceded by Brian Thomas	Member of the Georgia House of Representatives from the 100th district 2013–2023	Succeeded by David Clark
Preceded by Regina Lewis-Ward	Member of the Georgia House of Representatives from the 109th district 2023–Present	Incumbent
