= Bruce Williamson (politician) =

American politician

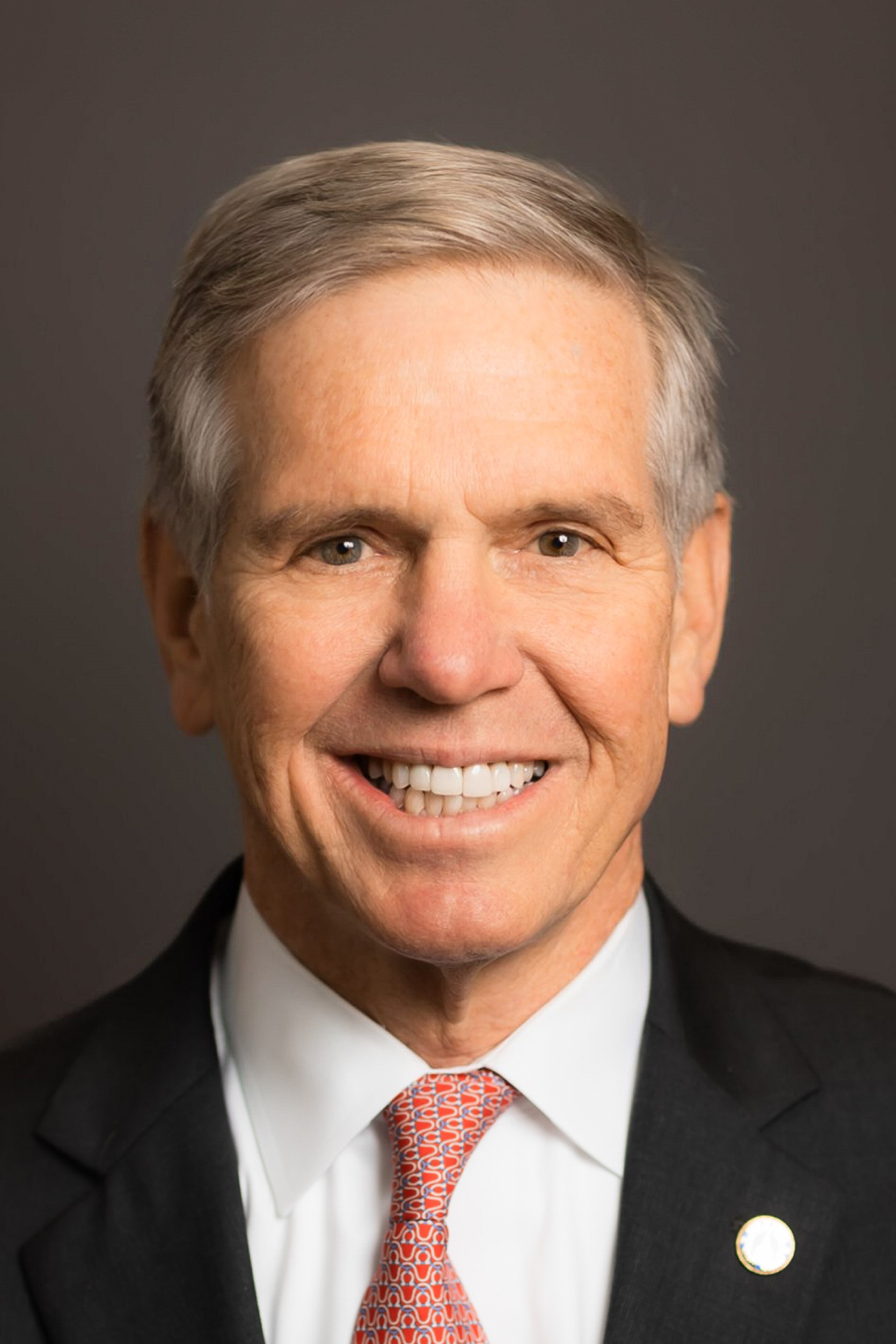
- Official headshot

Member of the Georgia House of Representatives
- Incumbent
- Assumed office January 10, 2011
- Preceded by: Jeff May
- Constituency: 111th district (2011–2013); 115th district (2013–2023); 112th district (2023–present)

Personal details
- Born: Hugh Brewster Williamson III; April 17, 1954 (age 72) Monroe, Georgia, U.S.
- Party: Republican
- Spouse: Vickie Williamson
- Children: 4
- Education: Furman University; University of Georgia
- Occupation: Banker; politician

Hugh Brewster "Bruce" Williamson III (born April 17, 1954) is an American politician from Georgia. Williamson is a Republican member of the Georgia House of Representatives since 2011.

== Personal life ==
Williamson's wife is Vickie Williamson. They have four children. Williamson and his family live in Monroe, Georgia.

Georgia House of Representatives
Preceded by Jeff May	Member of the Georgia House of Representatives from the 111th district 2011–2013	Succeeded by Brian Strickland
Preceded by Doug McKillip	Member of the Georgia House of Representatives from the 115th district 2013–2023	Succeeded by Regina Lewis-Ward
Preceded by Dave Belton	Member of the Georgia House of Representatives from the 112th district 2023–Present	Incumbent
