= Ola, Georgia =

- Unincorporated community
- Location within Georgia Location within the United States
- Coordinates: 33°26′7″N 84°2′30″W
- Country: United States
- State: Georgia
- County: Henry
- Time zone: UTC-5 (Eastern (EST))
  - Summer (DST): UTC-4 (EDT)

Ola is an unincorporated community in Henry County, Georgia, United States. Ola residents use a McDonough mailing address.

== History ==
The community was named after Ola Patten, the daughter of an early settler.

== Geography ==
Ola is located at 33°26′07″N 84°02′30″W (33.43527, -84.04156).

=== Major highways ===
- Georgia State Route 81

== Demographics ==
Most of Ola is within the postal limits of McDonough, Georgia and as such, most residents list McDonough as their city. However, some of the areas of Ola are in Henry County though they have a Jackson, Georgia (Butts County) mailing address.

== Schools ==
- Mainstay Academy (Special Education school)
- New Hope Elementary School
- Ola Elementary School
- Ola Middle School
- Ola High School
- Rock Springs Elementary School
- Sharon Christian Academy
- New Creation Christian Academy
