= Georgia's 112th House of Representatives district =

State district in Georgia, USA

Georgia's 112th State House of Representatives district
Representative
Bruce Williamson; R–Monroe
- Demographics: 72.5% White; 22.4% Black; 2.8% Hispanic; 0.6% Asian
- Population: 54,007

District 112 elects one member of the Georgia House of Representatives. It contains parts of Gwinnett County and Walton County.

== Members ==
- Dave Belton (2015–2023)
- Bruce Williamson (since 2023)
