= Daniel Roberts (hurdler) =

American sprinter & hurdler (born 1997)

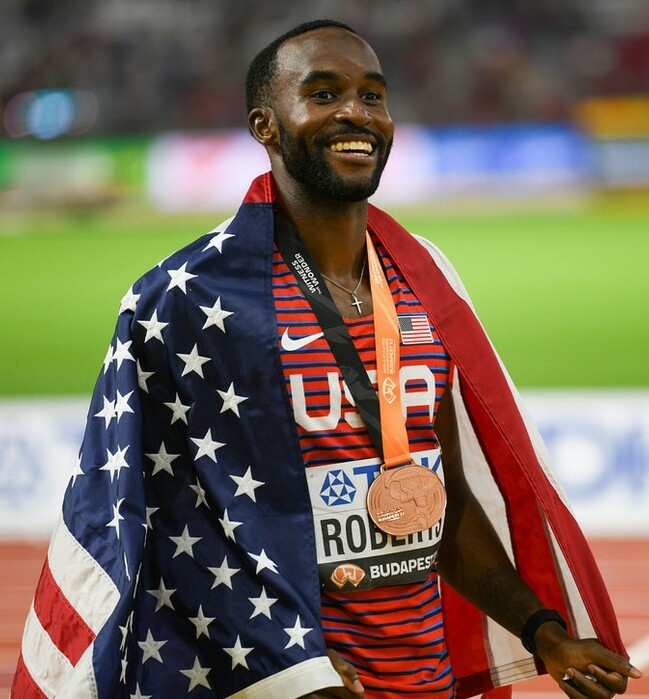
- Roberts at the 2023 World Athletics Championships in Budapest

Personal information
- Full name: Daniel Ellis Roberts
- Nationality: United States
- Born: November 13, 1997 (age 28) Atlanta, Georgia, U.S.
- Height: 6 ft 0 in (183 cm)
- Weight: 175 lb (79 kg)

Sport
- Sport: Track and field
- Events: 60 meters hurdles 110 meters hurdles
- College team: Kentucky Wildcats track and field
- Turned pro: 2019

Achievements and titles
- Personal bests: 60 m: 6.63 i (2019); 60 m hurdles: 7.39 (2023); 100 m: 10.40 (2025); 110 Hurdles: 12.96 (Eugene 2024)
Medal record
Men's athletics
Representing the United States
Olympic Games
Silver medal – second place	2024 Paris	110 m hurdles
World Championships
Bronze medal – third place	2023 Budapest	110 m hurdles

Daniel Ellis Roberts (born November 13, 1997) is an American sprinter and Hurdler. He won a silver medal at the 2024 Summer Olympics and a bronze medal at the 2023 World Championships in the 110 m hurdles.

== Professional ==
Roberts represents Nike.

In October 2024, it was announced that he had signed up for the inaugural season of the Michael Johnson founded Grand Slam Track.

Grand Slam Track results
Slam	Race group	Event	Pl.	Time	Prize money
2025 Kingston Slam	Short hurdles	110 m hurdles	4th	13.36	US$25,000
2025 Kingston Slam	Short hurdles	100 m	5th	10.70	US$25,000
2025 Miami Slam	Short hurdles	110 m hurdles	6th	13.36	US$20,000
2025 Miami Slam	Short hurdles	100 m	4th	10.40	US$20,000
2025 Philadelphia Slam	Short hurdles	110 m hurdles	4th	13.30	US$15,000
2025 Philadelphia Slam	Short hurdles	100 m		DNS	US$15,000

Year	Competition	Venue	Position	Event	Notes
Representing University of Kentucky
2018	2018 USA Outdoor Track and Field Championships	Des Moines, Iowa	11th	110 metres hurdles	13.75 (+0.1)
Representing Nike
2019	USA Outdoor Track and Field Championships	Des Moines, Iowa	1st	110 meters hurdles	13.23

As of 15 September 2024, Roberts holds the track record for 110 metres hurdles for Suzhou, China. On 27 April 2024 he clocked 13.12 seconds with a following wind of 0.8 m/s.

== NCAA ==
Roberts is a 4-time USTFCCCA NCAA Division I All-American and 1-time Southeastern Conference champion. Roberts' 110 m hurdle time ranks in the top 2 US collegian all-time. Roberts set University of Kentucky records under the guidance of coach Tim Hall and previously (2016–2018) UK volunteer assistant coach/training partner Omar McLeod / Direction of coach Edrick Floréal. Roberts won the 110 hurdles at 2019 Drake Relays. Roberts, who tied the Southeastern Conference meet record of 13.07 in the 110 m hurdles.

Kentucky Wildcats
Year	Southeastern Conference Indoor track and field Championship	NCAA Indoor track and field Championship	Southeastern Conference Outdoor track and field Championship	NCAA Outdoor track and field Championship
2019	60 m 4th place 6.65		4×100 meters relay 4th 39.50	
2019	60 meters hurdles 2nd 7.48	60 m hurdles 2nd place 7.41	110 m hurdles 1st 13.07 (1.0)	110 m hurdles 2nd place 13.00
2019	4×400 meters relay 6th 3:11.54		4×400 meters relay DNF	
2018	60 meters hurdles 6th 7.88	60 meters hurdles 9th 7.81	100 m hurdles 2nd 13.27 (0.9)	110 m hurdles 23rd place DQ +0.8
2018	60 meters hurdles 6th 7.88	60 meters hurdles 9th 7.81	4×100 meters relay DNF	4×100 meters relay 16th 39.56
2017			100 m hurdles 6th 13.82 +0.2	110 m hurdles 37th place 14.06 +0.5

== Early life and prep ==
Roberts is a 2016 graduate of Hampton High School. Prior to senior year he went to Starr's Mill High School in Peachtree City. In the Fall of 2015, Roberts suffered an American football knee injury tearing his ACL, MCL, PCL and started wearing the long tights because of the surgery scars.

Roberts has a big sports family with his brothers playing NCAA football and sister Alicia Roberts ran track and played NCAA Volleyball.

Year	Outdoor Track	
USATF Junior Olympic Track & Field Championships
2015	110 meters hurdles	DNS
New Balance Nationals Outdoor
2015	110 meters hurdles	2nd place (13.40 +3.8)
Representing Hampton High School at Georgia High School Association 4A state championship
2016	High jump	6th place (1.88 m (6 ft 2 in))
2015	100 meters hurdles	1st place (13.81 (-0.5))
2015	300 meters hurdles	1st place (36.97)
2015	Triple jump	1st place (14.49 m (47 ft 6 1/4 in) (+0.0))
2014	110 m hurdles	2nd place (13.92 (+0.8))
2014	Triple jump	4th place (14.52 m (47 ft 7 1/2 in) (+0.1))
2014	4 × 100 m relay	12th place (42.56)
Representing Starr's Mill High School at Georgia High School Association 5A state championship
2013	110 meters hurdles	5th place (15.17 (-1.6))
2013	Triple jump	7th place (13.35 m (43 ft 9 1/2 in) (-0.7))
