= Dave Belton =

American politician from Georgia

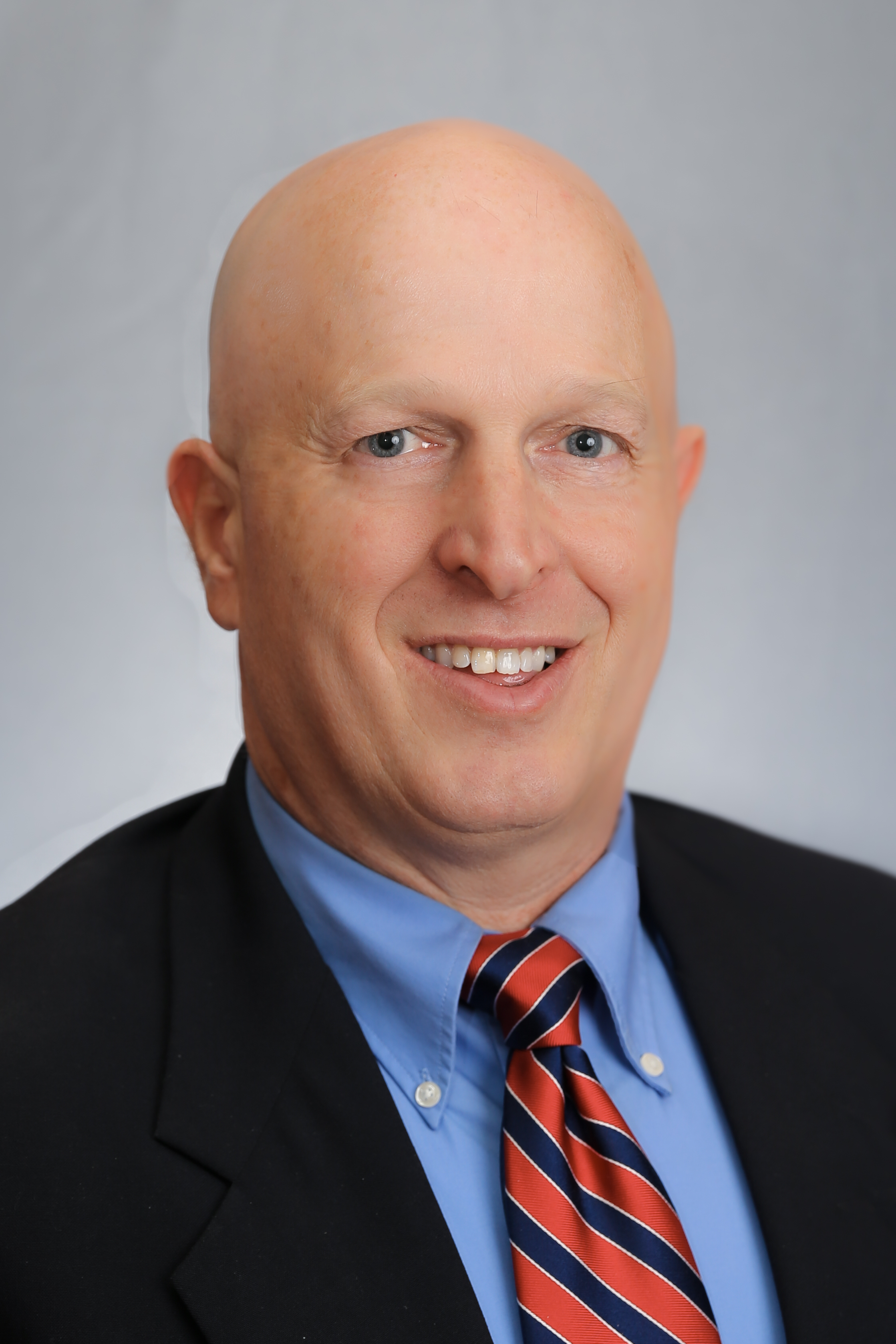

Member of the Georgia House of Representatives from the 112th district
- In office January 12, 2015 – January 9, 2023
- Preceded by: Doug Holt
- Succeeded by: Tim Fleming (Redistricting)

Personal details
- Born: David Calvin Belton; April 6, 1964 (age 62) Subic Bay, Philippines
- Party: Republican
- Spouse: Theresa Belton
- Children: 3
- Occupation: Politician

David Calvin Belton (born April 6, 1964) is an American politician who served in the Georgia House of Representatives from the 112th district from 2015 to 2023.

== Personal life ==
Belton's wife is Theresa Belton. They have three children. Belton and his family live in Buckhead, Georgia.

Georgia House of Representatives
Preceded by Doug Holt	Member of the Georgia House of Representatives from the 112th district 2015–2023	Succeeded by Bruce Williamson
