= Georgia's 109th House of Representatives district =

State district in Georgia, USA

Georgia's 109th State House of Representatives district
Representative
Dewey McClain; D–Lawrenceville
- Demographics: 54.5% White; 33.9% Black; 6.0% Hispanic; 2.4% Asian
- Population: 56,870

District 109 elects one member of the Georgia House of Representatives. It contains parts of Gwinnett County.

== Members ==
- Dale Rutledge (2013–2021)
- Regina Lewis-Ward (2021–2023)
- Dewey McClain (since 2023)
