= Georgia's 115th House of Representatives district =

State district in Georgia, USA

Georgia's 115th State House of Representatives district
Representative
Regina Lewis-Ward; D–McDonough
- Demographics: 75.4% White; 20.2% Black; 1.8% Hispanic; 1.5% Asian
- Population: 53,725

District 115 elects one member of the Georgia House of Representatives. It contains parts of DeKalb County and Henry County.

== Members ==
- Bruce Williamson (2013–2023)
- Regina Lewis-Ward (since 2023)
