= Luella, Georgia =

Unincorporated community in Georgia, U.S.

Coordinates: 33°21′07″N 84°10′43″W

Luella is an unincorporated community in Henry County, in the U.S. state of Georgia.

== History ==
A post office called Luella was established in 1887, and remained in operation until 1955. The community was named after the daughter of a railroad official.

The Georgia General Assembly incorporated Luella as a town in 1912. The town's municipal charter was repealed in 1995.
