= Hampton, Georgia =

City in Georgia, United States

- City
- Seal

- Location in Henry County and the state of Georgia
- Coordinates: 33°22′53″N 84°17′22″W
- Country: United States
- State: Georgia
- County: Henry
- Named for: Wade Hampton

Government
  - Mayor: Ann Tarpley

Area
  - Total: 8.50 sq mi (22.02 km^{2})
  - Land: 8.44 sq mi (21.87 km^{2})
  - Water: 0.058 sq mi (0.15 km^{2})
- Elevation: 883 ft (269 m)

Population (2020)
  - Total: 8,368
  - Density: 990.9/sq mi (382.58/km^{2})
- Time zone: UTC−5 (Eastern (EST))
  - Summer (DST): UTC−4 (EDT)
- ZIP Code: 30228
- Area codes: 770/678/470
- FIPS code: 13-36276
- GNIS feature ID: 0315076
- Website: hamptonga.gov

Hampton is a city in southwestern Henry County, Georgia, United States. The population as of the 2020 census was 8,368. It is a southeastern suburb in the Atlanta metropolitan area.

== History ==
The city was once known as "Bear Creek" or "Bear Creek Station", named after a creek that runs through the area. The town was moved, established and renamed in 1873 when the Central Railroad of Georgia was built approx. one mile to the east. It was named after Brig. General Wade Hampton, an American soldier in the Revolutionary War and War of 1812. Hampton's historical origins date back to the early 1820s, when the first white settlers arrived in the Bear Creek area.

== Geography ==
Hampton is located in southwestern Henry County at 33°22′53″N 84°17′22″W (33.381522, -84.289573).

U.S. Route 19/41, a four-lane highway, runs through the western side of the city, leading north 28 miles (45 km) to downtown Atlanta and south 11 miles (18 km) to Griffin. Georgia State Route 20 runs east from US 19/41 through the southern part of Hampton, leading 7 miles (11 km) to Interstate 75 and 10 miles (16 km) to McDonough.

According to the United States Census Bureau, Hampton has a total area of 5.7 square miles (14.7 km^{2}), of which 5.6 square miles (14.5 km^{2}) are land and 0.04 square miles (0.1 km^{2}), or 0.86%, are water.

=== Major highways ===
- U.S. Route 19
- U.S. Route 41
- State Route 3
- State Route 20
- State Route 81

== Demographics ==
Historical population
Census	Pop.	Note	%±
1880	621		—
1890	422		−32.0%
1900	468		10.9%
1910	1,093		133.5%
1920	927		−15.2%
1930	1,002		8.1%
1940	619		−38.2%
1950	864		39.6%
1960	1,253		45.0%
1970	1,551		23.8%
1980	2,059		32.8%
1990	2,694		30.8%
2000	3,857		43.2%
2010	6,987		81.2%
2020	8,368		19.8%
2025 (est.)	9,349	▲	11.7%
U.S. Decennial Census; 1850-1870 1870-1880; 1890-1910 1920-1930; 1940 1950 1960; 1970 1980 1990; 2000 2010; 2025

=== 2020 census ===
As of the 2020 census, Hampton had a population of 8,368. The median age was 34.6 years. 27.8% of residents were under the age of 18 and 10.6% were 65 years of age or older. For every 100 females, there were 85.9 males, and for every 100 females age 18 and over, there were 81.4 males age 18 and over.

92.8% of residents lived in urban areas, while 7.2% lived in rural areas.

There were 2,826 households in Hampton, of which 43.9% had children under the age of 18 living in them. Of all households, 46.5% were married-couple households, 14.6% were households with a male householder and no spouse or partner present, and 33.2% were households with a female householder and no spouse or partner present. About 19.6% of all households were made up of individuals and 7.2% had someone living alone who was 65 years of age or older. Of these households, 1,857 were family households.

There were 2,969 housing units, of which 4.8% were vacant. The homeowner vacancy rate was 1.3% and the rental vacancy rate was 6.6%.

Hampton racial composition as of 2020
Race	Num.	Perc.
White (non-Hispanic)	2,935	35.07%
Black or African American (non-Hispanic)	4,198	50.17%
Native American	14	0.17%
Asian	130	1.55%
Pacific Islander	1	0.01%
Other/Mixed	405	4.84%
Hispanic or Latino	685	8.19%

== Education ==
Hampton is in the Henry County Schools school district.

Hampton Elementary School is in the city limits.

The following schools are outside the city limits but have Hampton postal addresses:

- Mt. Carmel Elementary School
- Rocky Creek Elementary School
- Hampton Middle School
- Hampton High School
- Dutchtown High School

Lovejoy High School of the Clayton County Public Schools has a Hampton post office address, but is not in the city limits, and does not have an attendance boundary covering Hampton, as it is in an entirely separate school district covering a separate county.

== Atlanta Motor Speedway ==
Hampton is home to the Atlanta Motor Speedway, a 1.54 mile intermediate quad-oval speedway.

=== Current events ===
==== NASCAR Cup Series ====
1. Autotrader 400 (1960–present)
2. Quaker State 400 (1960–2010, 2021–present)
3. The Winston (1986)

==== NASCAR O'Reilly Auto Parts Series ====
1. Bennett Transportation & Logistics 250 (1992–present)
2. Focused Health 250 (2021–present)

==== NASCAR Craftsman Truck Series ====
1. Fr8 208 (2004–2012, 2015–present)
2. E-Z-Go 200 (2005–2008)

=== Former events ===
==== ARCA Re/Max Series ====
1. Atlanta ARCA 400 (1984–2003)

==== NASCAR Whelen Southern Modified Tour ====
1. Atlanta 150 (2010)

==== ASA National Tour ====
1. World Financial Group 150 (2004)

==== Indy Racing League ====
1. zMAX Atlanta 500 Classic (1998–2001)
