= Kelleytown, Georgia =

- Unincorporated community
- Location within Metro Atlanta
- Coordinates: 33°32′15″N 84°5′21″W
- Country: United States
- State: Georgia
- County: Henry
- Time zone: UTC-5 (Eastern (EST))
  - Summer (DST): UTC-4 (EDT)

Kelleytown is an unincorporated community in Henry County, Georgia, United States. Kelleytown is within the postal limits of McDonough and as such, most residents list McDonough as their city. The community is located eight miles (13 km) northeast of the historic downtown McDonough Square. The community has produced many prominent Henry Countians including Congressmen, a mayor, commissioners, judges, attorneys, politicians, educators, and many professional, highly respected businessmen and women.

== History ==
Kelleytown (known in the early 20th century as Kelleystown) is an unincorporated center whose inhabitants made many worthwhile contributions to Henry County history. The names Chafin, Crumbley, Elliott, Owen, Hightower, Phillips, and Thompson figure prominently in the community. It is from the Kelley family, one of Henry County's founding families, that Kelleytown Community and Kelley Presbyterian Church derived their names. The 1850 Henry County Census notes ten people with the Kelley surname.

White House Community became established around the homestead of a first settler Silas Moseley, and Kelleytown Community around that of his brother Benjamin Moseley (1787–1851). Reuben Kelley (1800–1875), another first settler of Henry County, married Mary Moseley (1807–1895), a daughter of Benjamin, and settled nearby. According to land ownership records and census data, Reuben Kelley was originally from Greene County. Their old homestead remains in a dilapidated state off of Kelleytown Road, and the original Kelley family graveyard is in the back of the property. There are ten graves, including three that are unmarked. All the monuments have fallen from their bases and are weatherworn.

Several of the Kelleys served in the Confederate States Army during the American Civil War. Thomas Hughey Kelley (1832–1865), son of Reuben and Mary, enlisted March 6, 1862 and served in Company I of the 44th Regiment, Georgia Volunteer Infantry, Doles-Cook Brigade, Army of Northern Virginia, of the Confederate States Army. At the time of the War he was in his mid-30s and had a wife and three young children at home. He was captured at the Battle of Spotsylvania Court House on May 10, 1864, and held prisoner at Fort Delaware where he died of disease contracted in the prison. He is buried in Finns Point National Cemetery in New Jersey.

Captain Henry Holcombe Kelley (1834–1910) married Alice Cloud Elliott and they lived and reared their family at the crossroads at Kelleytown. The couple had four children: son, Thomas Cloud (1869–1963) and daughters Kate, Maude, and Elon. Kate married Edgar Owen, Maude married Henry Owen, and Elon married Manse Crumbley. All continued to live in Kelleytown. Henry was one of Henry County's prominent and most widely known citizens. A June 1885 issue of The Henry County Weekly proclaims that "H.H. Kelley has the best patch of cotton in his district." He was a confederate veteran, and during the Civil War commanded a company in the Nineteenth Georgia Regiment. Another article in The Henry County Weekly states, "Beneath the giant oaks that form the beautiful grove near Mr. Henry Kelley's home on the 8th day of August 1900, was held the reunion of Company B, 2nd Georgia Battalion, Georgia Reserves. This was the first time these comrades had met since they parted more than 30 years ago."

Following in the footsteps of his father, Thomas Cloud Kelley (known as "T.C.") was a successful entrepreneur and owned over 1,000 acres (4 km^{2}) of land that featured a working farm, cotton plantation, cotton gin, sawmill, and dairy in Kelleytown. As such, he was respected as a progressive businessman in Henry County. He took an active interest in the welfare and further building of the County in all areas for most of his life. He was a public-spirited man, having formerly served as commissioner from 1917 to 1920. He was a Freemason, and a charter member of the old White House Masonic Lodge.

John Thompson (1803–1881) and wife Jane Elliott (1807–1879) lived at Benjamin Moseley's old home. W.F. Chafin (1840–1908) a member of a large Henry County family lived nearby, and members of his family became allies with the Kelleys. L.P. Owen (1848–1921) and wife Elizabeth Crumbley lived there and were the parents of the Kelleytown Owens.

== Pleasant Grove School ==
When the original schoolhouse near Kelleytown Road burned, the Pleasant Grove School was built on the same site. Even in the new building there were no indoor bathrooms, drinking water was drawn from a well, and the building was heated by a potbellied stove.

It was a private school, but the residents of Kelleytown would help pay for anyone that wanted to attend and couldn't afford tuition. Grades 1–3 were in one room, and grades 4–6 were in another. The school only went through ninth grade, and then the students transferred to another school in McDonough. The school closed in 1951.

== Kelley Presbyterian Church ==
The Kelley Presbyterian Church came into being as a result of a small Sunday school group which had been meeting since 1896. Its meeting place was the one-room Kelleytown Schoolhouse located across the street from where the church was later built. In November 1899 Reverend W.P. Hemphill, Evangelist of Atlanta Presbytery, assisted by Reverend J.B. Mack, conducted a series of services there. Three of the people who attended those services united with the church universal as an immediate result. They were Henry Holcombe Kelley, Mrs. T.C. Kelley, and Henry Franklin Green.

On the first Sunday in January 1900, the Kelley Presbyterian Church was officially organized. Ten charter members were enrolled on that day: Henry Holcombe Kelley, Mrs. T.C. Kelley, Henry Franklin Green, Samuel Patterson Green, Henry Clay Stephens (a carpenter who built many of the houses in Kelleytown and Stockbridge), Miss Evie Stephens, Mrs. Glance Farrar, Dr. Maston Evans Berry, Mr. and Mrs. Jack McDaniel.

Before the end of 1900, a church was built on land donated by Henry Holcombe Kelley, and 2 acres (8,100 m^{2}) adjoining had been purchased for use as a cemetery. The church is located at 3637 Airline Road. The original clapboard meeting house was renovated with brick veneer and enlarged in 1941, with further additions added in 1962. Elizabeth Mathis Cheatham generously donated an outdoor pavilion to the church in 1992. The pavilion has been home to many homecomings and get-togethers at the church. Bud Kelley furnished water to the church for 13 years when the church's well was dry.

In 1997 Kelley was named "Small Church of the Year" for the Presbytery of Greater Atlanta and in Georgia by the Synod of South Atlantic. One of the reasons for this distinction includes the "Dogwood Tree Project" of the Kelley Presbyterian Men. Since 1996 over 500 pink dogwoods have been given to new residents moving into the community. The Presbyterian Women have distinguished themselves in the past few years by sewing eight inspiring banners for worship and creating nearly 100 exquisite Christian ornaments. Both of these projects will remain as treasures to the congregation for generations to come.

The church marked its 100th anniversary on April 12, 2000. Throughout the century, Kelley has been noted for its strong lay leadership among its women and men. Brothers Vic and Manse Crumbley were known for their Sunday school teaching and superintendent skills. Many aspiring student preachers from Columbia Seminary have preached at Kelley Church, and lore of the church holds that famous theologian Peter Marshall preached at Kelley Church while a student, and that he traveled to Kelleytown to observe these brothers in action. The first women elders were Margaret Crumbley and Betty Latimer.

Two women of note who provided more than four decades of leadership in music were Annie Ruth Owen and Ruth Foster. Foster was also a dedicated teacher of the catechism. She was instrumental in establishing the Ruth Foster Educational Trust fund, which has provided more than twenty $1,000 college scholarships.

Kelley also distinguishes itself by including children and young people in its entire corporate life. A nursery is provided for the youngest infants, but children and babies are welcomed and included in worship and social gatherings.

Since Kelley's first year, the congregation has been the hub and center of Kelleytown. All the activities of the area revolved around its modest facilities, and its members are known for their hospitality and concern for individuals in need. In 1950, an article in the Atlanta Constitution described Kelley as "one of the landmarks in the state, for no strictly rural church in Georgia is credited with a more complete program for community service."

== Kelley Chapel Baptist Church ==
The Kelley Chapel Baptist Church began as a brush arbor in the late 19th century on land owned by Henry Holcombe Kelley. It was a place for the African American population of Kelleytown to gather and worship. Two ministers, one Baptist and one Methodist, led the small congregation.

Henry Holcombe Kelley donated land to the group, and Kelley Chapel Baptist Church was formally organized in 1884. The black people of Kelleytown were much like extended family to their white neighbors, and were very much respected. Some blacks became tenant farmers and partnered in work with whites. For example, Thomas Jackson was like a brother to James Troy Chafin Sr., and he was the only person that Chafin wanted by his side on his deathbed. Other notable African Americans who lived in Kelleytown included Cora Albert, Clerie Usher Walker, Eddie Bryant(Boy Trip), Jeanette and Zeke Reed, Eddie Jackson, Love Jackson, and Henry Walker and his wife, Lizziebeth.

There was a closeness between Kelley Chapel and Kelley Presbyterian. The churches would often share literature and other materials. In Kelleytown, whenever someone had something that others didn't, it was shared without a second thought.

Kelley Chapel Baptist Church is located at 3351 Airline Road in McDonough.

== The Kelleytown General Store and Henry County's first drive-in theater ==
The original Kelleytown General Store and Theater

The original Kelleytown general store is still standing, and is located at the corner of Airline and Kelleytown Roads. The store was built in 1908 by Edgar Owen and was later operated by Manse Crumbley. When the foundation was dug for the store, the red clay removed was then used to make the blocks to build the store.

Crumbley also served as postmaster, doctor, dentist, veterinarian, and accountant to the Kelleytown community. Mail was delivered to the store and was sorted for residents. The store remained in operation until 1966. Bud and Jean Kelley opened a modern gas station and grocery store across the street from the original store around 1963. One of the most interesting parts of the original store was the white makeshift "movie screen" that was painted on the side of the building. P.E. Ausband, a Kelleytown resident who worked for Monogram Pictures in Atlanta, would bring movie reels home and project them onto the outdoor screen; he used electricity from a nearby house. The movies were shown at no charge, and people would pull their mules and wagons up the driveway and wait for the sun to go down. This began Henry County's first drive-in theater. James Chafin, Bud Kelley, Owen Chafin, and Sarah Hightower fondly recall lying on their stomachs in the grass watching exciting Western movies.

In the late 1990s, Sarah Hightower and John Gilbert, a filmmaker with the Henry County Arts Alliance, revived the tradition for a couple of weekends. They showed the black-and-white classics Abbott and Costello Meet Frankenstein and the Marx Brothers' The Cocoanuts. More than 350 people came with chairs, blankets, and picnic baskets to watch the films.

== J. G. Smith and Kelleytown's power plant ==
In 1918, Dr. J. G. Smith developed plans for a hydroelectric power plant on Cotton Indian Creek at Kelleytown. The cost of the project was $100,000. The water that powered the plant was diverted from the course of Cotton Indian Creek by Smith's Dam just east of Crumbley Road. From this point the water traveled one mile (1.6 km) through a race to the Power House at Airline Road. As a result, homes in Kelleytown had electricity before neighboring larger McDonough.

Dr. Smith lived on Macon Street in downtown McDonough. he is recognized as having contributed more to the development of McDonough than any other individual in its history. He established McDonough's first water system, had a successful medical practice (he was county physician), the first Chevrolet dealership in Henry County, and the local ice company. Most importantly, he installed a steam engine and electric generator near the McDonough Depot that provided the people of McDonough with their first electric street lights. The concrete turbine shafts from the power plant are still visible today from the modern bridge on Airline Road (near the present-day Crown River and Cotton Creek subdivisions).

== Edgar Owen's waterwheel ==
In 1916, Edgar Owen built a dam, cotton gin, and gristmill on his Camp Creek property at the Henry and Rockdale county line. In the process, Kelleytown's most famous landmark, a huge over-shot waterwheel was created. This was the largest waterwheel in Henry County, at over 30 feet (9.1 m) in diameter, and many claimed it was the largest in the world. The wheel was a favorite gathering spot for picnics, barbecues, and frolics. The cool, shady shoals around the mill were a favorite swimming and sunbathing spot.

Only a year later, Edgar Owen's overall suspenders became entangled with the equipment at the waterwheel, causing his untimely death.

The waterwheel was eventually dismantled in 1966 and moved to Stone Mountain Park. A large portrait of the waterwheel currently hangs in Henry Medical Center.

== Geography ==
Kelleytown is located at 33°32′15″N 84°05′20″W (33.53761, -84.08905).

=== Major highways ===
- Georgia State Route 20
- Georgia State Route 155
- Georgia State Route 138

== Demographics ==
Kelleytown is within the postal limits of McDonough and as such, most residents list McDonough as their city.

== Sources ==
- De l'Etoile, Martha Ann Moore (1992). The Kelleys of Kelleytown. Griffin.
- Ide, S. Diane (April–May 2004). "Remembering Kelleytown". Henry Magazine. pp. 15–22.
- Moore, Joseph Henry Hightower (1993). First Families of Henry County, Georgia. Fernandina Beach: Wolfe Publishing. ISBN 0-9628557-3-1.
- Morris, Gene, Jr. (2000). True Southerners: A Pictorial History of Henry County, Georgia. McDonough, Georgia: The Henry County Record Publishers.
- Rainer, Vessie Thrasher (1971). Henry County, Georgia: The Mother of Counties. McDonough, Georgia.
- Kelley Presbyterian Church Records
- Henry County Obituaries (1908–1929)
- Confederate Soldier Obituaries (1879–1943)
