= Stockbridge High School =

Public high school in Stockbridge, Georgia, United States

Location
- 1151 Old Conyers Rd; Stockbridge, Georgia 30281; United States; 33°33′51″N 84°12′10″W

Information
- Type: Public, coeducational
- Established: 1964
- Superintendent: Mary Elizabeth Davis
- Principal: James Thornton
- Faculty: 81.50 (FTE)
- Grades: 9–12
- Enrollment: 1,506 (2023–2024)
- Student to teacher ratio: 18.48
- Colors: Green, orange and white
- Mascot: Tiger
- Website: https://shs.henry.k12.ga.us/

Stockbridge High School is a high school located in Stockbridge, Georgia, United States, in the Henry County School District. It enrolls around 1,800 students in grades 9–12.

== Championships and sports ==
- 1981 - Stockbridge Varsity Wrestling Team; 10–0; first team in Stockbridge HS history to go undefeated
- 2001 - AAAAA Wrestling Team produced four state placers:
- 2006 - AAAA State Elite Eight, boys' tennis
- 2007 - AAAA Traditional and Team duals state champions, first and only state championship team in school history having six placers
- 2013 - Football Varsity State Championships; Stockbridge High School beat Union Grove HS (49-6);* 2014 - 4-AAAAA Region Champs, Semi-Finals
- 2015 - 4-AAAAA Region Champs, Quarterfinals
- 2016 - 4-AAAAA Region Champs, Semi-Finals
- 2017 - 4-AAAA Sub-Region Champs, Quarterfinals
- 2018 - 4-AAAAA Region Champs, Semi-Finals
- 2023 - 4-AAAA Region Champs, Finals

== Notable alumni ==
- Kyle Davies - starting pitcher for the Kansas City Royals (formerly of the Atlanta Braves), class of 2001
- Michael Harris II - outfielder for the Atlanta Braves
- Bruce Irvin - retired professional NFL linebacker who played 12 seasons, drafted by the Seattle Seahawks 15th overall in the first round of the 2012 NFL draft
- Ed Roland - lead singer of Collective Soul
- Terry Turner - television writer and screenwriter, best known with his wife Bonnie as the creators of popular television shows 3rd Rock from the Sun and That '70s Show, and writers of Tommy Boy, Wayne's World, and Coneheads, class of 1966
- Ken Webster - former professional NFL cornerback, drafted by the New England Patriots 252nd overall in the 7th round of the 2019 NFL draft
- Southside - record producer
- Destroy Lonely - rapper
- Brenton Cox Jr. - professional NFL linebacker for the Green Bay Packers who signed him as an undrafted free agent in 2023
