= Locust Grove, Georgia =

City in the United States

- City
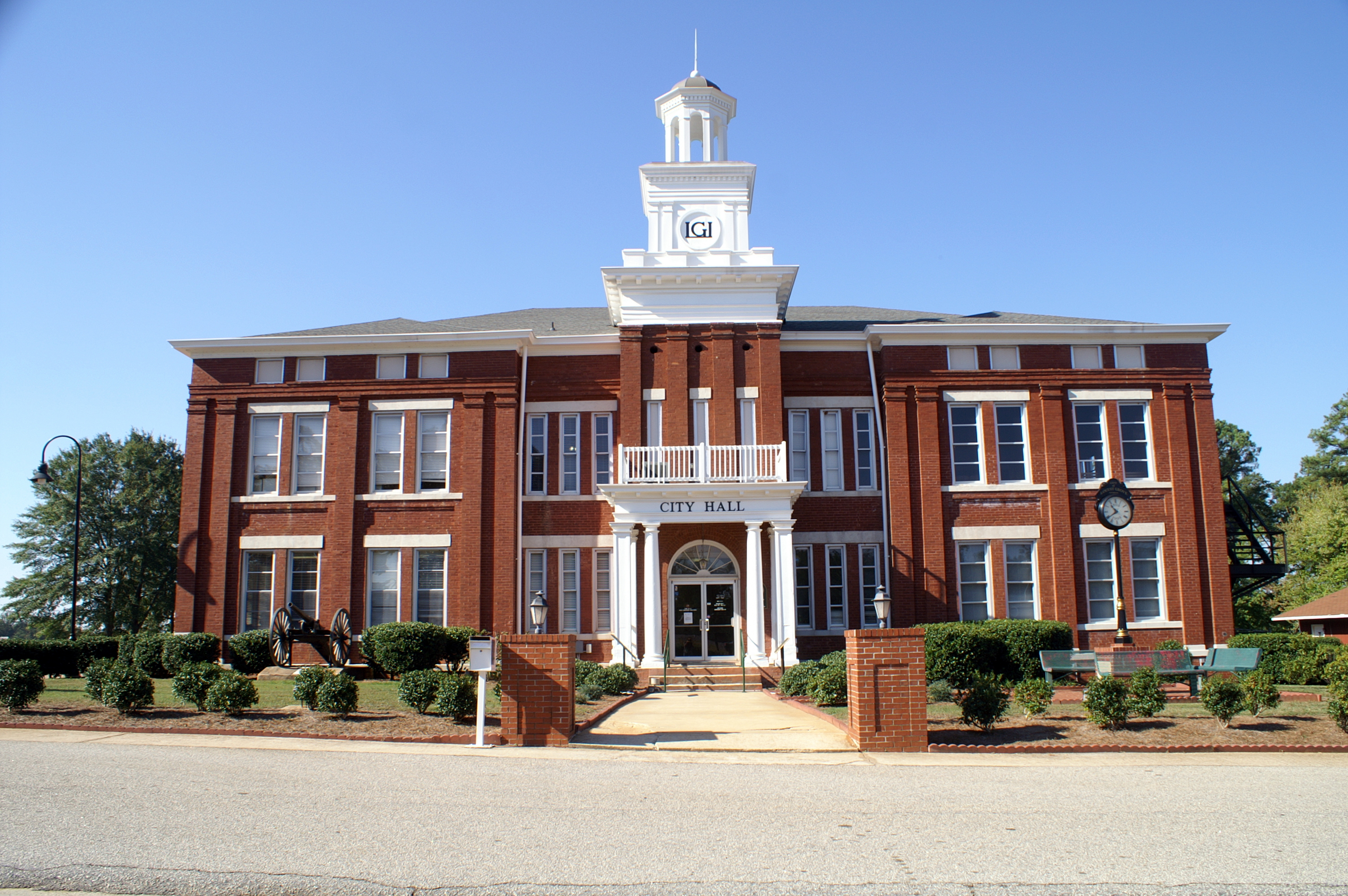
- Locust Grove City Hall

- Flag Seal

- Location in Henry County and the state of Georgia
- Coordinates: 33°20′44″N 84°6′18″W
- Country: United States
- State: Georgia
- County: Henry

Area
  - Total: 11.78 sq mi (30.51 km^{2})
  - Land: 11.59 sq mi (30.02 km^{2})
  - Water: 0.19 sq mi (0.49 km^{2})
- Elevation: 837 ft (255 m)

Population (2020)
  - Total: 8,947
  - Density: 771.9/sq mi (298.04/km^{2})
- Time zone: UTC−5 (Eastern (EST))
  - Summer (DST): UTC−4 (EDT)
- ZIP Code: 30248
- Area code: 770/678/470
- FIPS code: 13-47140
- GNIS feature ID: 0332253
- Website: www.locustgrove-ga.gov

Locust Grove is a city in Henry County, Georgia, United States. The population was 8,947 in 2020. Some unincorporated communities such as Luella and many rural areas surround Locust Grove, and those communities have Locust Grove postal addresses.

Locust Grove has experienced a growth in population and in businesses coming into the area. In 1900 the population of the city was 254 and is now over 5,000.

== History ==
The community was named for a grove of locust trees near the original town site. Georgia General Assembly incorporated Locust Grove in 1893.

== Government ==
In December 2025, the Henry County Sheriff's Office, which serves the county including Locust Grove, promoted NBA Hall of Famer Shaquille O'Neal to the position of Chief of Community Relations. O'Neal had previously served as the office's Director of Community Relations for five years.

== Geography ==
Locust Grove, Georgia is located in southern Henry County, Georgia, situated 35 miles southeast of Atlanta along Interstate 75 at Exit 212 (Bill Gardner Parkway).

According to the United States Census Bureau, the city has a total area of 11.78 square miles (30.51 km^{2}) of which 11.59 square miles (30.02 km^{2}) is land and 0.19 square miles (0.49 km^{2}) is water.

== Demographics ==
Historical population
Census	Pop.	Note	%±
1890	255		—
1900	254		−0.4%
1910	716		181.9%
1920	529		−26.1%
1930	428		−19.1%
1940	349		−18.5%
1950	405		16.0%
1960	369		−8.9%
1970	642		74.0%
1980	1,479		130.4%
1990	1,681		13.7%
2000	2,322		38.1%
2010	5,402		132.6%
2020	8,947		65.6%
2025 (est.)	14,610	▲	63.3%
U.S. Decennial Census; 1850–1870 1870–1880; 1890–1910 1920–1930; 1940 1950 1960; 1970 1980 1990; 2000 2010; 2025

=== 2020 census ===
As of the 2020 census, Locust Grove had a population of 8,947. The median age was 32.5 years. 29.8% of residents were under the age of 18 and 9.0% of residents were 65 years of age or older. For every 100 females there were 86.6 males, and for every 100 females age 18 and over there were 82.0 males age 18 and over.

93.6% of residents lived in urban areas, while 6.4% lived in rural areas.

There were 2,962 households in Locust Grove, of which 47.9% had children under the age of 18 living in them. Of all households, 46.7% were married-couple households, 13.5% were households with a male householder and no spouse or partner present, and 33.3% were households with a female householder and no spouse or partner present. About 19.2% of all households were made up of individuals and 6.6% had someone living alone who was 65 years of age or older. The city had 1,837 families.

There were 3,110 housing units, of which 4.8% were vacant. The homeowner vacancy rate was 2.6% and the rental vacancy rate was 5.1%.

Locust Grove racial composition as of 2020
Race	Num.	Perc.
White (non-Hispanic)	3,125	34.93%
Black or African American (non-Hispanic)	4,627	51.72%
Native American	10	0.11%
Asian	140	1.56%
Pacific Islander	4	0.04%
Other/Mixed	431	4.82%
Hispanic or Latino	610	6.82%

== Arts and culture ==
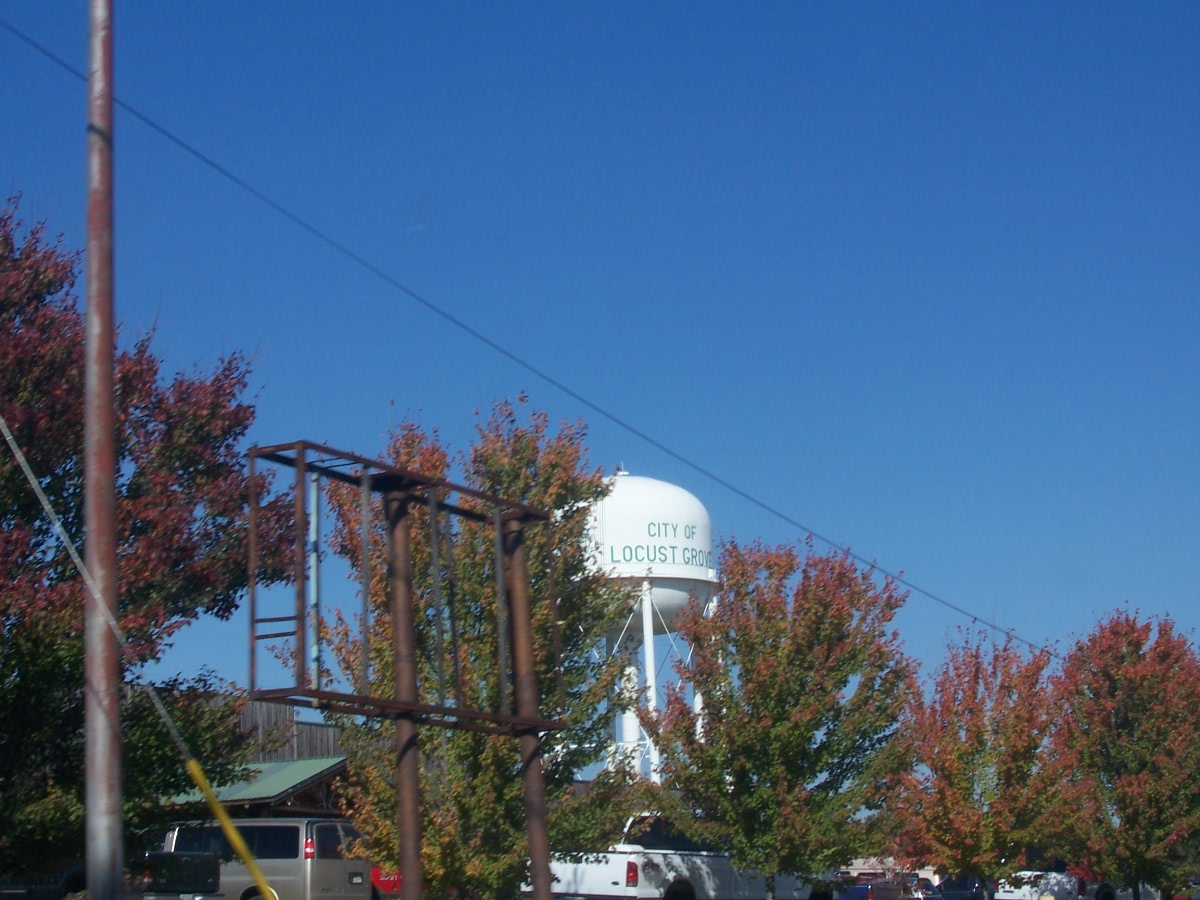
Locust Grove water tower

=== Attractions ===
Tanger Outlet Center opened for business in the fall of 1994. Since that time many new businesses have made Locust Grove their home.

Locust Grove is also home to Noah's Ark Animal Sanctuary, a non-profit preserve and rehabilitation facility home to more than 1,000 animals. A group home sharing the site was previously licensed by the state of Georgia to provide residential care for up to 24 children but has since closed.

Locust Grove has a platform for watching the Norfolk Southern line that runs parallel to State Route 42/US Highway 23. It is equipped with a scanner radio that allows visitors to the platform to listen in to the local railroad frequency, which broadcasts out of the defect detector in nearby Jenkinsburg.

== Education ==
=== Public ===
==== Elementary ====
- Locust Grove Elementary School
- Unity Grove Elementary School
- Luella Elementary School
- New Hope Elementary School
- Bethlehem Elementary School

==== Middle ====
- Locust Grove Middle School
- Luella Middle School
- Ola Middle School

==== High ====
- Locust Grove High School
- Luella High School
- Ola High School

=== Private ===
- Strong Rock Christian School
- Heritage Baptist Christian School

== Infrastructure ==
=== Major highways ===
- Interstate 75
- U.S. Highway 23
- Georgia State Route 42
- Georgia State Route 155
- Georgia State Route 401

== Notable people ==
- Jordan Akins (born 1992), football player
- Lanie Buice (born 2006), stock car racing driver
- Jim L. Gillis Jr. (1916–2018), centenarian and member of the Georgia State Senate
- Chris Goslin (born 2000), soccer player
- Caleb Huntley (born 1998), football player
- Carl Patton (1949–2024), serial killer
