= Strong Rock Christian School =

Christian school in Locust Grove, Georgia, United States

Location
- 4200 Strong Rock Parkway; Locust Grove, Georgia 30248; United States
- Coordinates: 33°20′33″N 84°07′57″W

Information
- Type: Private, Christian
- Motto: "Inspiring the next generation for Christ"
- Established: 2006 (charter school year 2007)
- Head of school: Paul McCracken
- Faculty: 100
- Gender: Coeducational
- Enrollment: 826 (2018-2019 school year)
- Campus type: Rural
- Colors: Blue, red, silver and white
- Mascot: Patriots
- Website: www.strongrockchristianschool.com

Strong Rock Christian School is a private PK3–12 Christian school in Locust Grove, Georgia, United States.

== Academics ==
Strong Rock is split into three schools.

- Elementary School (preK 3–5)
- Academy (grades 6–8)
- High School (grades 9–12)

Strong Rock is accredited by AdvancED.

== Athletics ==
Athletic programs offered include football, baseball, basketball, wrestling, cross country, track and field, soccer, golf, softball, volleyball, cheerleading, lacrosse, swim, shotgun shooting, and tennis.

=== Boys' soccer ===
In 2013, Strong Rock Christian School varsity boys' soccer team made it to the first round of the 2013 GHSA Class A Boys' Soccer State Tournament, losing to Brookstone School 0–1. In 2014, Strong Rock the soccer team made it to the first round of the 2014 Class A Boys' Soccer State Tournament, where they played two-time Class A State Champion Savannah Country Day School. Strong Rock Christian School lost to Savannah Country Day School in penalty kicks, with a score of 1-1 (3-5 PK).

=== Girls' basketball ===
In 2012, Strong Rock Christian School varsity girls' basketball team made it to the preliminary round of the 2012 GHSA Class A Girls' Basketball State Tournament, losing to Trion High School 39–51. In 2013, the girls' basketball team made it to the first round of the 2013 GHSA Class A Private Girls' Basketball State Tournament, losing to St. Francis 13–67. However, after the loss of a NAIA senior who played for Belhaven University, Strong Rock Christian School did not qualify for the 2014 GHSA Class A Girls' Basketball State Tournament.

=== Girls' soccer ===
In 2010, Strong Rock Christian School varsity girls' soccer team won the GISA Class AA Region 1 Regional Championship. They then advanced to the 2010 GISA Class AA Girls' Soccer State Tournament, losing in the quarterfinals. In 2011, when Strong Rock Christian School joined the GHSA, the varsity girls' soccer team made it to the second round of the 2011 GHSA Class A Girls' Soccer State Tournament with a bye in the first round, losing to Fellowship Christian School 0–10. In 2012, the varsity girls' soccer team made it again to the second round of the 2012 GHSA Class A Girls' Soccer State Tournament, beating Providence Christian Academy 3-2 before losing to Pace Academy 1–3. In 2013, the varsity girls' soccer team captured its first GHSA Area 4 Championship and secured a bye for the first round of the 2013 GHSA Class A Girls' Soccer State Tournament. In the second round of the 2013 Class A Girls' Soccer State Tournament, Strong Rock Christian School lost to Savannah Country Day School 2–3. In 2014, due to the loss of two NCAA Division II seniors who played for Young Harris College and one NCAA Division III senior who played for Berry College, Strong Rock Christian School did not qualify for the 2014 GHSA Class A Girls' Soccer State Tournament.

=== Softball ===
In 2010, Strong Rock Christian School varsity softball team made it pass the 2010 GHSA Class A Softball State Playoffs and made it to the 2nd round of the 2010 GHSA Class A Softball State Tournament, where they lost to State runner-up Providence Christian Academy 0–1. In the loser bracket of the 2010 GHSA Class A Softball State Tournament, the varsity softball team lost 5–9 against Bryan County High School. In 2011, the varsity softball team only made it to the 2011 GHSA Class A Softball State Playoffs, where they lost to Wesleyan School 0–2. In 2012, the varsity softball team made it to the 2012 GHSA Class A Private Softball State Playoffs, where they lost to Athens Christian School 2-6 and 1-3 respectively. In 2013, the varsity softball team made it past the 2013 GHSA Class A Private Softball State Playoffs, and made it to the quarterfinals of the 2013 GHSA Class A Private Softball State Tournament, where they lost to Prince Avenue Christian School 4–5. In the loser bracket of the GHSA Class A Private Softball State Tournament, they lost to First Presbyterian Day School 0–4. In 2014, the varsity softball team made it only to the 2014 GHSA Class A Softball State Playoffs, where they lost to First Presbyterian Day School 0-5 and 0-11 respectively.

=== Volleyball ===
In 2010, Strong Rock Christian School varsity volleyball team made it to the 2010 GHSA Class A Volleyball State Playoffs, and lost to Westminster School in the first round 0–3. In 2011, Strong Rock Christian School made it to the 2011 GHSA Class A Volleyball State Playoffs and lost to Athens Academy in the first round again, 0–3. In 2012, the varsity volleyball team lost to The Walker School 0–3 in the first round of the 2012 GHSA Class A Volleyball State Playoffs. In 2013, due to the loss of a NAIA senior who played for Point University, Strong Rock Christian School Varsity Volleyball Team did not see any postseason action. In 2014, the varsity volleyball team recovered from the previous year and made it to the first round of the 2014 GHSA Class A State Volleyball Playoffs, where they lost to The Walker School 0-3 again. Strong Rock Christian School has never made it to the GHSA Class A State Volleyball Tournament.

== Notable alumni ==
- Demetrius Knight, NFL linebacker
