= Flippen, Georgia =

- Unincorporated community
- Location within Georgia Location within the United States
- Coordinates: 33°28′59″N 84°11′15″W
- Country: United States
- State: Georgia
- County: Henry
- Time zone: UTC-5 (Eastern (EST))
  - Summer (DST): UTC-4 (EDT)

Flippen is an unincorporated community in Henry County, Georgia, United States. Flippen is within the postal limits of McDonough and as such, most residents list McDonough as their city.

== History ==
Flippen had its start when the railroad was extended to that point. A post office called Flippen was established in 1884, and remained in operation until 1966. The community was named after a railroad agent, Mr. Flippen.

== Major highways ==
- Interstate 75
- U.S. Highway 23
- Georgia State Route 42
- Georgia State Route 401

== Demographics ==
Flippen is within the postal limits of McDonough, Georgia and as such, most residents list McDonough as their city.
