= Ola High School (Georgia) =

Public high school in McDonough, Georgia, United States

Coordinates: 33.445°N 84.040°W

Location
- 357 N Ola Road; McDonough, Georgia 30252; United States

Information
- Type: Public
- Motto: Preparing Students for the 21st Century
- Established: 2006
- School district: Henry County
- Principal: Rod May
- Teaching staff: 91.00 (FTE)
- Grades: 9th through 12th
- Enrollment: 1,652 (2023–2024)
- Student to teacher ratio: 18.15
- Campus size: 210 acres (40,000 m^{2})
- Campus type: Rural
- Colors: Green and gold
- Mascot: Mustang
- Website: https://ohs.henry.k12.ga.us/

Ola High School is a public high school located in McDonough, Georgia, United States. Its student body consists of about 1,400 students in grades 9–12. Its facilities include a football field, track, baseball field, tennis courts, marching band field, and a gymnasium for basketball.

The Ola Middle School is adjacent to the high school.

== History ==
In response to overcrowding at existing schools and growth and development in the rural southeastern area of Henry County, the Henry County Board of Education elected in 2005 to build a middle and a high school near the Ola unincorporated area, near the existing Ola Elementary School. Construction began the same year and was completed in May 2006, two months before the opening date of August 3, 2006. The total project cost for Ola Middle School and Ola High School was $43,585,000, and was completed by the Manhattan Construction Company. In the spring of 2023, a Georgia middle-school student stabbed another student 14 times in the school's gymnasium.

== Athletics ==
The following sports are offered:

- Baseball
- Basketball
- Cheerleading
- Cross country
- Football
- Girls' lacrosse
- Golf
- Gymnastics
- Pickleball
- Soccer
- Softball
- Swimming
- Tennis
- Track
- Volleyball
- Wrestling
- Marksmanship
