= Blacksville, Georgia =

- Unincorporated community
- Location in Henry County and the state of Georgia
- Coordinates: 33°25′18″N 84°9′3″W
- Country: United States
- State: Georgia
- County: Henry

Area
  - Total: 0.077 sq mi (0.2 km^{2})
  - Land: 0.077 sq mi (0.2 km^{2})
  - Water: 0 sq mi (0 km^{2})
- Elevation: 890 ft (270 m)

Population (2000)
  - Total: 4
  - Density: 52/sq mi (20/km^{2})
- Time zone: UTC-5 (Eastern (EST))
  - Summer (DST): UTC-4 (EDT)
- FIPS code: 13-08340
- GNIS feature ID: 0331179

Blacksville is an unincorporated community in Henry County, Georgia, United States. At the 2000 census it was recorded as a census-designated place (CDP), with a population of four. It was no longer a CDP at the 2010 census.

== History ==
Blacksville is named after the Black family of McDonough, Georgia. Their family were one of the early pioneers to move to the village of McDonough where Blacksville is now located. The segregation-era black high school for Henry County was in Blacksville and is now used as Henry County Middle School. Most of the community was subsequently annexed by nearby McDonough.

== Geography ==
According to the United States Census Bureau, the CDP had a total area of 0.1 square miles (0.26 km^{2}), all land.

=== Major highways ===
- Interstate 75
- U.S. Highway 23
- Georgia State Route 20
- Georgia State Route 42
- Georgia State Route 81
- Georgia State Route 155
- Georgia State Route 401
