= Henry County, Georgia =

- County
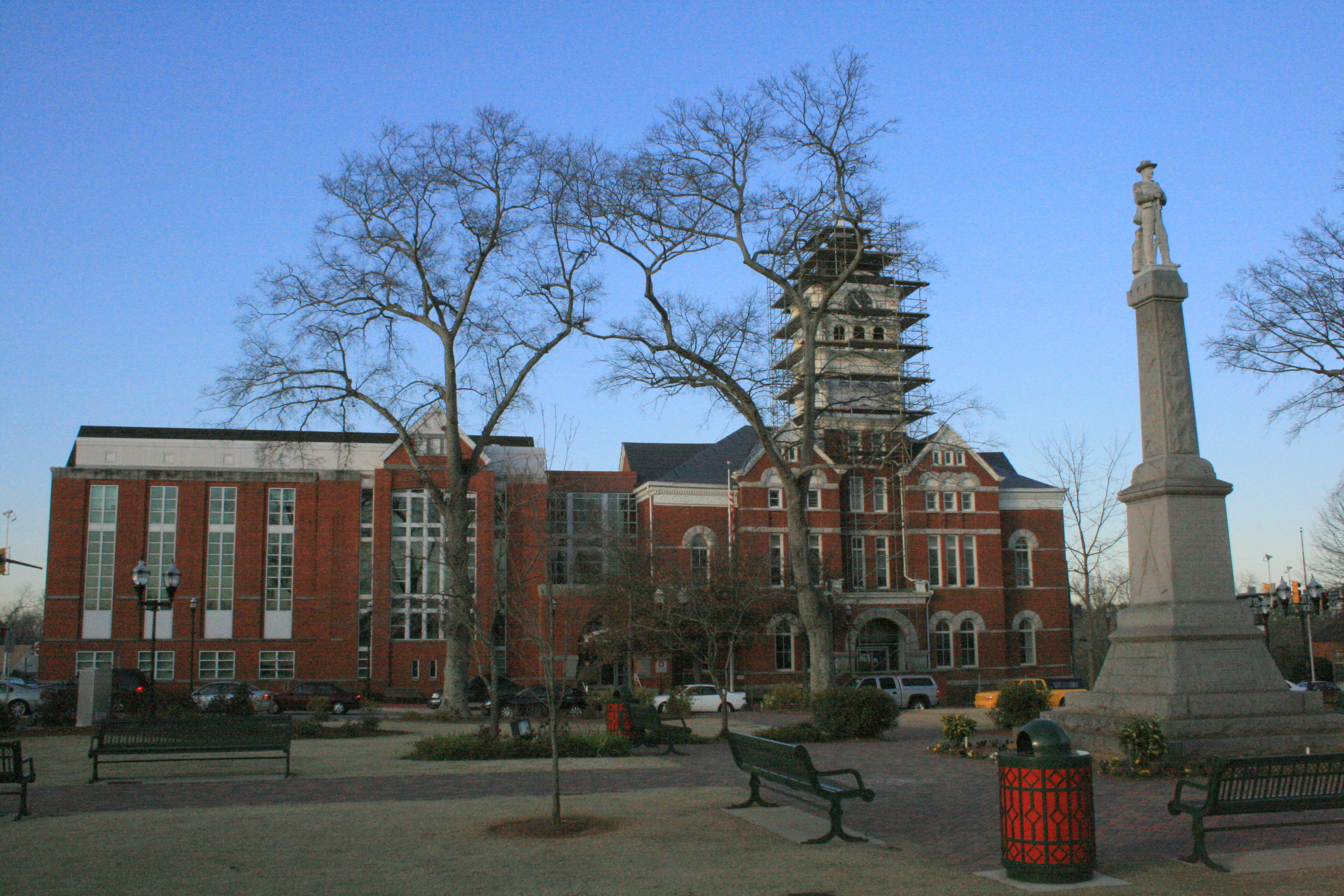
- Henry County Courthouse and Confederate monument

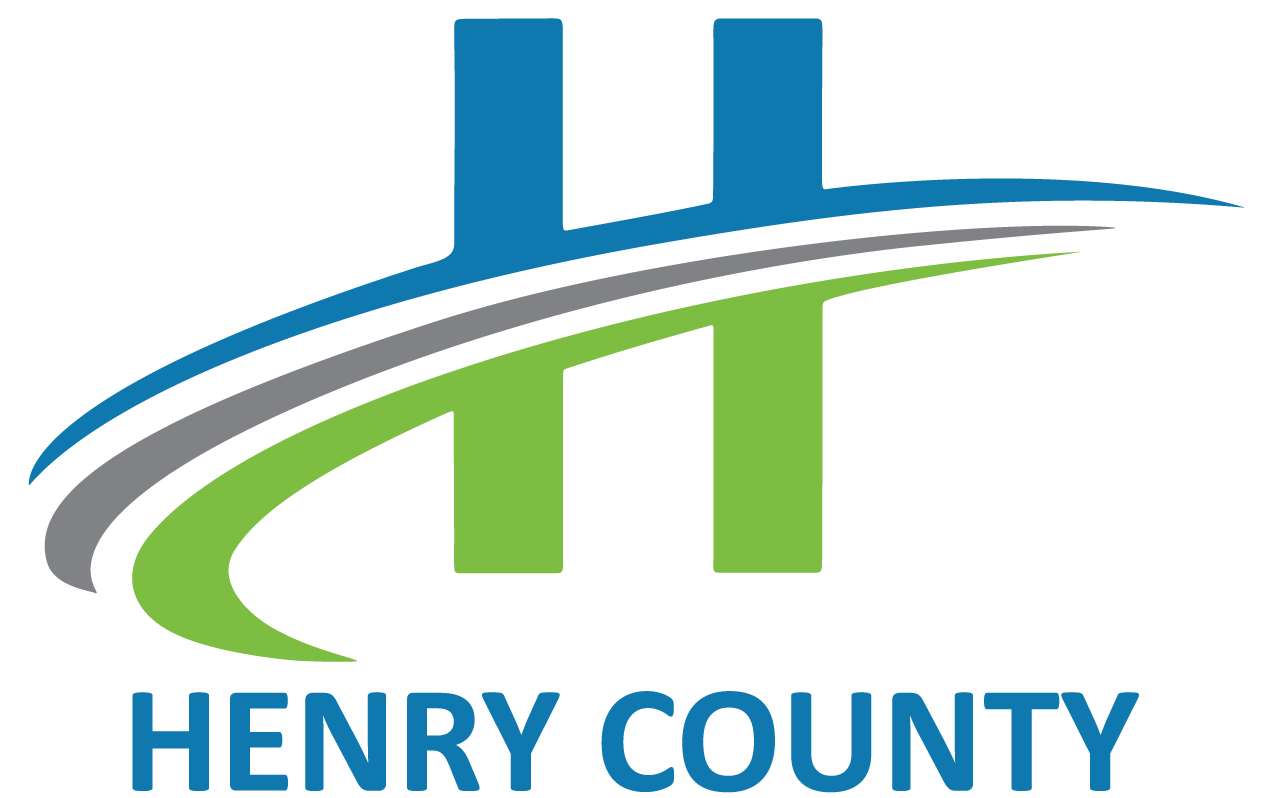
- Seal Logo

- Location within the U.S. state of Georgia
- Coordinates: 33°28′N 84°10′W
- Country: United States
- State: Georgia
- Founded: May 15, 1821; 205 years ago
- Named for: Patrick Henry
- Seat: McDonough
- Largest city: McDonough

Area
  - Total: 327 sq mi (850 km^{2})
  - Land: 322 sq mi (830 km^{2})
  - Water: 4.4 sq mi (11 km^{2}) 1.4%

Population (2020)
  - Total: 240,712
  - Estimate (2025): 264,922 ▲
  - Density: 755.3/sq mi (291.6/km^{2})
- Time zone: UTC−5 (Eastern)
  - Summer (DST): UTC−4 (EDT)
- Congressional districts: 3rd, 10th, 13th
- Website: henrycountyga.gov

Henry County is located in the north central portion of the U.S. state of Georgia. According to the 2020 census, the population of Henry County was 240,712, up from 203,922 in 2010. The county seat is McDonough. The county was named for Patrick Henry.

Henry County is part of the Atlanta-Sandy Springs-Roswell, GA metropolitan statistical area. The Henry County Courthouse is listed on the National Register of Historic Places.

== History ==
Henry County, Georgia, was created by the Georgia State Legislature in 1821 from land acquired from the Creek Indian Nation by the First Treaty of Indian Springs. Henry's original land area was much larger than it is today, stretching from near Indian Springs (present-day Indian Springs State Park) in the south to the Chattahoochee River near Sandy Springs in the north; encompassing most of present-day Metropolitan Atlanta. Before one year had passed, the size of the county was diminished through the separation of land areas which, in whole or in part, became the present-day DeKalb, Fulton, Fayette and Newton counties. Later divisions resulted in Clayton, Spalding, Rockdale and Butts counties.

In the beginning Henry County was a virgin wilderness, having just been ceded from the Creek Nation. Prior to 1821, the Creeks and a few trappers and traders were the only residents of this area. The Creek Indians left their mark through place names, a few small Indian Mounds scattered around the county and through the arrowheads and broken pottery which can be found throughout Henry County.

Jesse Johnson, son of John Johnson and great-grandfather of U.S. President Lyndon Baines Johnson, was a "first settler" of Henry County. He was a prosperous farmer, the second sheriff (1822–1835), and judge, before he moved to Texas. Jonesboro Road stretches through the county. In 1995, Henry County was the sixth-fastest-growing county in the United States.

== Geography ==
According to the U.S. Census Bureau, the county has a total area of 327 square miles (850 km^{2}), of which 322 square miles (830 km^{2}) is land and 4.4 square miles (11 km^{2}) (1.4%) is water.

The vast majority of Henry County is located in the Upper Ocmulgee River sub-basin of the Altamaha River basin, with just a very small western corner, west of Hampton, located in the Upper Flint River sub-basin of the ACF River Basin (Apalachicola-Chattahoochee-Flint River Basin).

=== Adjacent counties ===
- DeKalb County – north
- Rockdale County – northeast
- Newton County – east Northeast
- Butts County – southeast
- Spalding County – southwest
- Clayton County – west

== Communities ==
=== Cities ===
- Hampton
- Locust Grove
- McDonough
- Stockbridge

=== Census-designated place ===
- Heron Bay (part)

=== Unincorporated communities ===
- Blacksville
- Ellenwood (part)
- Flippen
- Kelleytown
- Luella
- Ola

== Demographics ==
Historical population
Census	Pop.	Note	%±
1830	10,566		—
1840	11,756		11.3%
1850	14,726		25.3%
1860	10,702		−27.3%
1870	10,102		−5.6%
1880	14,193		40.5%
1890	16,220		14.3%
1900	18,602		14.7%
1910	19,927		7.1%
1920	20,420		2.5%
1930	15,924		−22.0%
1940	15,119		−5.1%
1950	15,857		4.9%
1960	17,619		11.1%
1970	23,724		34.7%
1980	36,309		53.0%
1990	58,741		61.8%
2000	119,341		103.2%
2010	203,922		70.9%
2020	240,712		18.0%
2025 (est.)	264,922	▲	10.1%
U.S. Decennial Census; 1790-1880 1890-1910; 1920-1930 1930-1940; 1940-1950 1960-1980; 1980-2000 2010 2020

=== Racial and ethnic composition ===
Henry County, Georgia – Racial and ethnic composition Note: the US Census treats Hispanic/Latino as an ethnic category. This table excludes Latinos from the racial categories and assigns them to a separate category. Hispanics/Latinos may be of any race.
Race / Ethnicity (NH = Non-Hispanic)	Pop 1980	Pop 1990	Pop 2000	Pop 2010	Pop 2020	% 1980	% 1990	% 2000	% 2010	% 2020
White alone (NH)	29,535	51,807	95,550	107,083	86,297	81.34%	88.20%	80.06%	52.51%	35.85%
Black or African American alone (NH)	6,213	6,041	17,435	74,056	116,431	17.11%	10.28%	14.61%	36.32%	48.37%
Native American or Alaska Native alone (NH)	71	107	245	482	427	0.20%	0.18%	0.21%	0.24%	0.18%
Asian alone (NH)	91	323	2,062	5,902	7,976	0.25%	0.55%	1.73%	2.89%	3.31%
Native Hawaiian or Pacific Islander alone (NH)	x	x	45	110	119	x	x	0.04%	0.05%	0.05%
Other race alone (NH)	120	0	162	504	1,650	0.33%	0.00%	0.14%	0.25%	0.69%
Mixed race or Multiracial (NH)	x	x	1,150	3,972	9,375	x	x	0.96%	1.95%	3.89%
Hispanic or Latino (any race)	279	463	2,692	11,813	18,437	0.77%	0.79%	2.26%	5.79%	7.66%
Total	36,309	58,741	119,341	203,922	240,712	100.00%	100.00%	100.00%	100.00%	100.00%

=== 2020 census ===
As of the 2020 census, the county had a population of 240,712, 82,794 households, and 60,471 families residing in the county. The median age was 37.7 years, with 25.2% of residents under the age of 18 and 12.4% aged 65 years or older, and 81.2% of residents lived in urban areas while 18.8% lived in rural areas.

For every 100 females there were 89.8 males, and for every 100 females age 18 and over there were 85.6 males age 18 and over.

The racial makeup of the county was 37.1% White, 49.1% Black or African American, 0.3% American Indian and Alaska Native, 3.4% Asian, 0.1% Native Hawaiian and Pacific Islander, 3.6% from some other race, and 6.5% from two or more races. Hispanic or Latino residents of any race comprised 7.7% of the population.

There were 82,794 households in the county, of which 39.3% had children under the age of 18 living with them and 29.5% had a female householder with no spouse or partner present. About 19.7% of all households were made up of individuals and 6.8% had someone living alone who was 65 years of age or older.

There were 86,594 housing units, of which 4.4% were vacant. Among occupied housing units, 73.0% were owner-occupied and 27.0% were renter-occupied. The homeowner vacancy rate was 1.4% and the rental vacancy rate was 6.1%.

== Economy ==
Goya Foods has its Atlanta offices in an unincorporated area near McDonough.

Additionally, a pair of warehouses used to exist along US 23 south of McDonough, one of which was owned by Whirlpool Corporation, and the other by Toys 'R' Us.

== Media ==
WKKP is the local radio media outlet. It broadcasts 24 hours a day on 100.9 FM and 1410 AM, and has a classic country format.

The Henry Herald is the local county news print media.

== Sports ==
The semi-professional soccer team Georgia Revolution FC plays in the National Premier Soccer League at the Warhawk Stadium.

Atlanta Motor Speedway is located in Henry County and hosts an annual NASCAR race and many other events throughout the year, including the 2021 Publix Atlanta Marathon, which moved to the Speedway premises.

== Education ==
Local public schools are operated by the Henry County Schools.

=== Enriched Virtual Program ===
- Impact academy

=== Alternative schools ===
- EXCEL Academy (known as Patrick Henry alternative)
- Mainstay Academy (GNETS - Special Education)

=== Private schools ===
- ABC Montessori (Toddler - 12)
- Bible Baptist Christian School (K4–12)
- Community Christian School (Nursery–12)
- Creekside Christian Academy
- Eagle's Landing Christian Academy (K3–12)
- Lake Dow Christian Academy
- New Creation Christian Academy
- North Henry Academy (K3–8)
- Strong Rock Christian School (K–12)
- Peoples Baptist Academy
- Heritage Baptist Christian School
- The Sharon School
- McDonough Methodist Academy

=== Higher education ===
Mercer University has a Regional Academic Center in McDonough. The center, opened in 2003, offers programs through the university's College of Continuing and Professional Studies and Mercer's Tift College of Education. Clayton State University and Gordon College also offer a range of college courses at the Academy for Advanced Studies in McDonough.

Southern Crescent Technical College's Henry County Center (in McDonough) offers programs in Allied Health, Business Technology, Logistics and Supply Chain Management, Computer Information Systems, Personal Services, Public Safety, and Drafting Technology.

== Government and politics ==
For elections to the United States House of Representatives, Henry County is divided between Georgia's 10th congressional district and Georgia's 13th congressional district.

=== Local government ===
The Henry County Board of Commissioners is responsible for administering county government to residents. Four commissioners are elected by voters in individual districts, while the commission chairman is elected countywide and serves as the county's chief executive. June Wood, the former commission chair, was the first African-American to serve in the position after being elected in a December 2016 run-off election. She left office in December 2020 after losing her bid for re-election. As of January 2023, the following individuals serve the county on the Board of Commissioners:

Henry County Board of Commissioners
Name	Party	District
Carlotta Harris-Harrell	Democratic	Chairman (at-large)
Johnny Wilson	Republican	1
Neat Robinson	Democratic	2
Dee Anglyn III	Republican	3
Michael Price	Democratic	4
Kevin Lewis	Democratic	5

In December 2025, the Henry County Sheriff's Office, which serves the county including Locust Grove, promoted NBA Hall of Famer Shaquille O'Neal to the position of Chief of Community Relations. O'Neal had previously served as the office's Director of Community Relations for five years.

=== State government ===
For elections to the Georgia State Senate, Henry County is a part of districts 10, 17, 25 and 42. For elections to the Georgia House of Representatives, Henry County is represented by districts 74, 78, 81, 115, 116 and 117.

=== Voting patterns ===
As of the 2020s, Henry County is a strongly Democratic county, voting 64.52% for Kamala Harris in 2024. Prior to 1984, Henry County had a presidential voting pattern typical of any other Solid South county in Georgia, consistently awarding landslide margins to Democrats. In 1920, it was one of three counties in the state (alongside Bleckley and Columbia) to give 100% of the vote to Democratic nominee James M. Cox. The first Republican to win Henry County was Richard Nixon in 1972, doing so with 77.93% of the vote, though it returned to the Democratic column when native Georgian Jimmy Carter won it in 1976 and 1980.

From 1984 to 2004, Henry County was a Republican stronghold, consistent with several Atlanta suburbs, as well as other suburban areas across the country. Strong margins in Henry County and other Atlanta suburbs were vital to Republicans' performance, offsetting strongly Democratic Black voters in Atlanta proper. Republican dominance peaked in 1988, when George H.W. Bush won 71.11% of the vote to Michael Dukakis' 28.41%, a 42.7% margin of victory. During this time, no Democrat managed to attain even 40 percent of the county's vote.

In the 2010s, the county rapidly flipped from being safely Republican at the start of the decade to safely Democratic by the end, thanks to explosive population growth that brought an influx of Democratic-leaning minority voters into the county, and a growing Democratic trend among suburban voters in general. The African American percentage of the population increased from 14.7% in the 2000 Census to 36.9% in 2010 and 48.4% in 2020, while the white proportion of the population fell from 81.4% in 2000 to 55.0% in 2010 and 35.9% in 2020. In 2004, Democrat John Kerry lost the county by 33.7%, but in 2008 and 2012, Democrat Barack Obama lost the county by only 7.4% and 3.3%, respectively. In 2016, Hillary Clinton won the county for the Democrats for the first time in 36 years, by a 4.4 percentage point margin of victory, despite the rightward shift taken by the rest of the country. In 2020, the county swung 16.1 points deeper into the Democratic column, the largest Democratic swing of any county in the country in that election, culminating in Joe Biden winning the county by 20.5 percentage points as he carried Georgia. In 2022, it was one of the few counties where Stacey Abrams improved on her 2018 margin against Republican Brian Kemp even as she performed worse statewide. She took 61% of the vote, and Raphael Warnock defeated Herschel Walker with a similar share of the vote in the concurrent Senate race. In 2024, Kamala Harris won 64.5% of the vote in Henry, a continued improvement on both Clinton and Biden's margins despite her statewide loss, and also the best showing for a non-Georgian Democrat in the county since John F. Kennedy in 1960. Henry swung the furthest for Harris than any other county in the country that year.

United States presidential election results for Henry County, Georgia
Year	Republican		Democratic		Third party(ies)	
Year	No.	%	No.	%	No.	%
1880	506	42.27%	691	57.73%	0	0.00%
1884	694	42.66%	933	57.34%	0	0.00%
1888	512	30.60%	1,136	67.90%	25	1.49%
1892	578	30.99%	718	38.50%	569	30.51%
1896	568	46.56%	569	46.64%	83	6.80%
1900	378	35.36%	639	59.78%	52	4.86%
1904	64	8.19%	464	59.41%	253	32.39%
1908	369	45.22%	369	45.22%	78	9.56%
1912	15	2.23%	536	79.64%	122	18.13%
1916	78	7.54%	868	83.86%	89	8.60%
1920	0	0.00%	608	100.00%	0	0.00%
1924	53	7.42%	594	83.19%	67	9.38%
1928	360	32.06%	763	67.94%	0	0.00%
1932	21	1.37%	1,496	97.65%	15	0.98%
1936	116	7.83%	1,362	91.90%	4	0.27%
1940	101	6.11%	1,551	93.77%	2	0.12%
1944	152	9.42%	1,461	90.58%	0	0.00%
1948	229	12.41%	1,400	75.84%	217	11.76%
1952	553	17.60%	2,589	82.40%	0	0.00%
1956	848	24.34%	2,636	75.66%	0	0.00%
1960	1,041	26.04%	2,957	73.96%	0	0.00%
1964	3,125	46.58%	3,583	53.41%	1	0.01%
1968	2,017	25.41%	2,317	29.19%	3,604	45.40%
1972	5,155	77.93%	1,460	22.07%	0	0.00%
1976	2,622	31.44%	5,717	68.56%	0	0.00%
1980	5,326	47.27%	5,635	50.01%	307	2.72%
1984	9,142	69.06%	4,096	30.94%	0	0.00%
1988	10,882	71.11%	4,348	28.41%	74	0.48%
1992	12,634	52.03%	7,817	32.19%	3,833	15.78%
1996	16,968	58.36%	9,498	32.67%	2,608	8.97%
2000	25,815	66.42%	11,971	30.80%	1,081	2.78%
2004	42,759	66.57%	21,096	32.84%	380	0.59%
2008	47,157	53.29%	40,567	45.85%	762	0.86%
2012	46,774	51.10%	43,761	47.81%	996	1.09%
2016	45,724	46.02%	50,057	50.38%	3,586	3.61%
2020	48,259	39.23%	73,443	59.70%	1,314	1.07%
2024	44,982	34.86%	83,253	64.52%	799	0.62%

United States Senate election results for Henry County, Georgia2
Year	Republican		Democratic		Third party(ies)	
Year	No.	%	No.	%	No.	%
2020	47,486	39.02%	71,592	58.82%	2,631	2.16%
2020	41,145	37.62%	68,235	62.38%	0	0.00%

United States Senate election results for Henry County, Georgia3
Year	Republican		Democratic		Third party(ies)	
Year	No.	%	No.	%	No.	%
2020	26,824	22.08%	49,407	40.67%	45,239	37.24%
2020	40,824	37.32%	68,576	62.68%	0	0.00%
2022	32,819	34.46%	60,756	63.80%	1,654	1.74%
2022	28,098	33.74%	55,188	66.26%	0	0.00%

Georgia Gubernatorial election results for Henry County
Year	Republican		Democratic		Third party(ies)	
Year	No.	%	No.	%	No.	%
2022	36,392	38.08%	58,643	61.36%	533	0.56%

Henry County is one of six "reverse pivot counties", counties that voted Republican in 2008 and 2012 before voting Democratic in 2016 onward. It is also the county that shifted furthest to the left since 2012, having done so by 33 percentage points as of 2024.

== Transportation ==
=== Major highways ===
- Interstate 75 /

State Route 401 (unsigned)

- Interstate 675 / State Route 413 (unsigned)
- U.S. Route 19 / U.S. Route 41 / State Route 3
- U.S. Route 23 / State Route 42
- State Route 20
- State Route 81
- State Route 138
- State Route 155

=== Pedestrians and cycling ===
- Reeves Creek Trail

=== Transit systems ===
- Henry County operates its own reservation-based transit service for use by county residents. In addition, Xpress, a regional commuter bus service operated by the Georgia Regional Transportation Authority, serves park-and-ride lots in Stockbridge, Hampton, and McDonough.

== See also ==
- National Register of Historic Places listings in Henry County, Georgia
- List of counties in Georgia
