= Stockbridge, Georgia =

- City
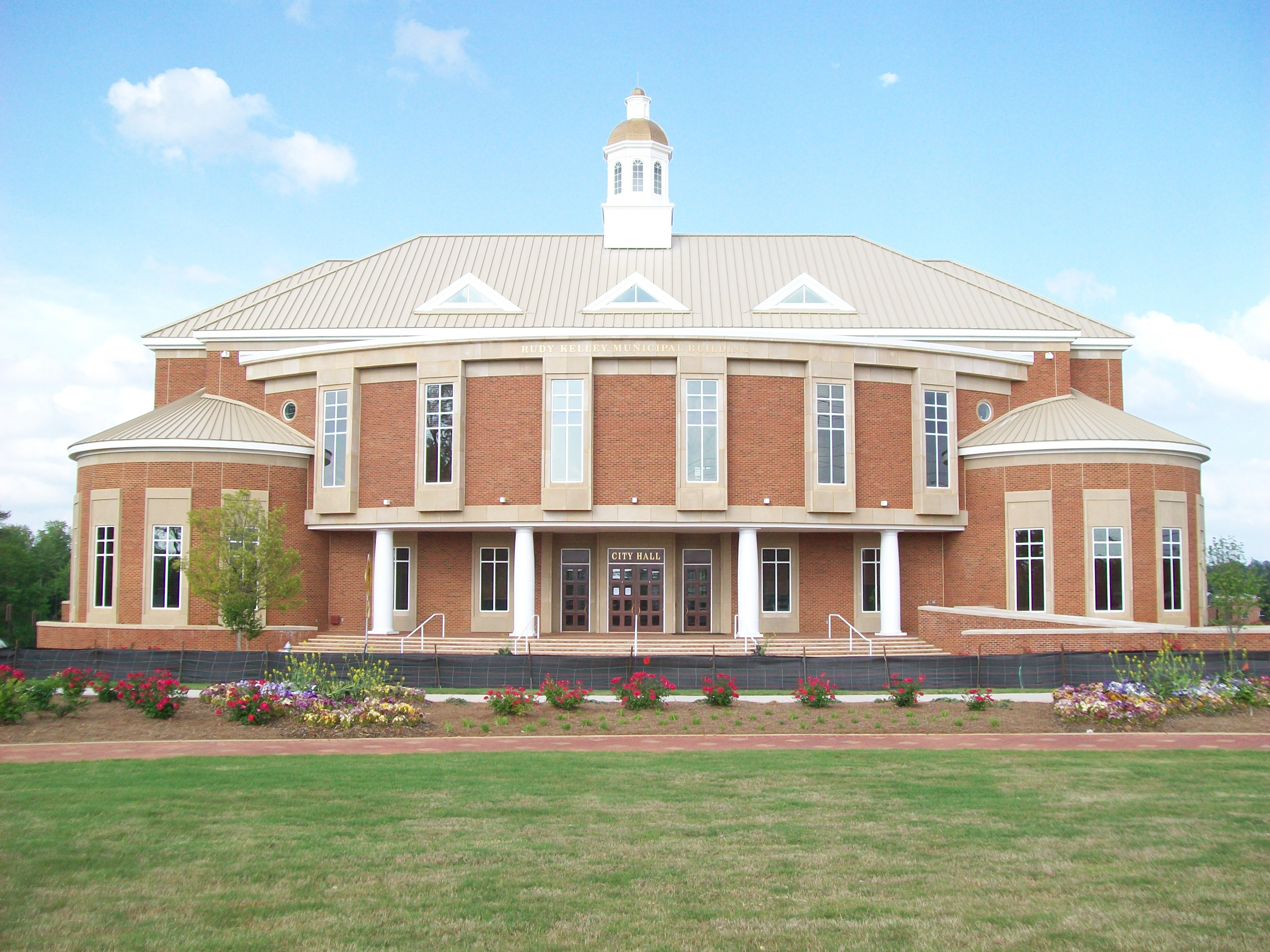
- Stockbridge City Hall

- Flag Seal

- Location of Stockbridge in Metro Atlanta
- Coordinates: 33°32′3″N 84°13′52″W
- Country: United States
- State: Georgia
- County: Henry
- Named for: Levi Stockbridge

Government
  - Mayor: Jayden L. Williams

Area
  - Total: 13.82 sq mi (35.79 km^{2})
  - Land: 13.70 sq mi (35.48 km^{2})
  - Water: 0.12 sq mi (0.31 km^{2})
- Elevation: 801 ft (244 m)

Population (2020)
  - Total: 28,973
  - Density: 2,115.0/sq mi (816.59/km^{2})
- Time zone: UTC-5 (Eastern (EST))
  - Summer (DST): UTC-4 (EDT)
- ZIP code: 30281
- Area codes: 770/678/470
- FIPS code: 13-73704
- GNIS feature ID: 0342357
- Website: stockbridgega.org

Stockbridge is a city in Henry County, Georgia, United States. As of 2020, its population was 28,973. Stockbridge is part of the Atlanta metropolitan area and is a suburb of Atlanta

== History ==
The area was settled in 1829 when Concord Methodist Church was organized near present-day Old Stagecoach Road. It was granted a post office on April 5, 1847, named for a traveling professor, Levi Stockbridge, who passed through the area many times before the post office was built. He was said to be well known and respected in his namesake community. Others contend that the city was named after Thomas Stocks, who was State Surveyor and president of the Georgia State Senate in the 1820s.

In 1881, the East Tennessee, Virginia and Georgia Railroad was to pass through Stockbridge between Macon and Atlanta. The settlers who owned the land about Old Stockbridge asked such a high price for their land that two prominent Atlanta citizens, John W. Grant and George W. Adair, bought a tract about a mile south of Old Stockbridge and offered lots at a reasonable price. Here the railroad built their depot and many lots were sold. The depot was located about 600 feet (180 m) north of what is now North Henry Blvd but was destroyed by the Southern Railway in the early 1980s.

Stockbridge was incorporated as a town in 1895 and as a city on August 6, 1920, turning 100 years old on August 6, 2020.

The Aaron and Margaret Parker Jr. House and Walden-Turner House in Stockbridge are listed on the National Register of Historic Places.

=== Naming mystery ===
On May 6, 1992, Mayor Segio received a letter from John Stockbridge of South Carolina requesting a letter of "Greeting" from the City of Stockbridge to the attendees of the first reunion of the Stockbridge family. In his letter, he mentioned that he grew up in Georgia and had been told as a child that the city of Stockbridge was named after his great-great-grandfather Levi Stockbridge, who had traveled back and forth from the North to his property in Florida and stopped here on his journey.

Levi Stockbridge was born on March 13, 1820, and fits the time frame just prior to the Civil War. Levi would have been 27 years of age when Stockbridge was assigned a post office in 1847.

Until May 6, 1992, there had never been a name other than Professor Stockbridge. At that time, Levi Stockbridge was mentioned as the person for whom the city may have been named.

It is not certain that Levi Stockbridge was the individual for whom the citizens of the community named their post office and village. However, through John Stockbridge's letters and many conversations with him, it is believed that this is the rightful Professor Stockbridge who had been unknown for 146 years.

=== Recent history ===
==== Eminent domain controversy ====
In late 2005 the City of Stockbridge engaged in a controversial preemptive use of eminent domain to buy over 16 acres (65,000 m^{2}) of land near the current city hall running along East Atlanta Road. The city reportedly wanted to build a new city hall, park/square, and a small tract of land for new and more desirable business to incorporate a new image for the city. Stockbridge became the focus of national news and was also one of the largest issues in the 2006 Georgia General Assembly and their efforts to prevent abuse of eminent domain.

Many of the citizens of Stockbridge and Henry County were surprised by the apparent abuse of eminent domain by the city. Early in 2006, a protest was organized by the NAACP and supported by the Republican and Libertarian parties from the county. Syndicated Atlanta talk show host Neal Boortz said during his show, "Private property rights are dead in Stockbridge, Georgia," and called members of the Stockbridge City Council "sorry bastards".

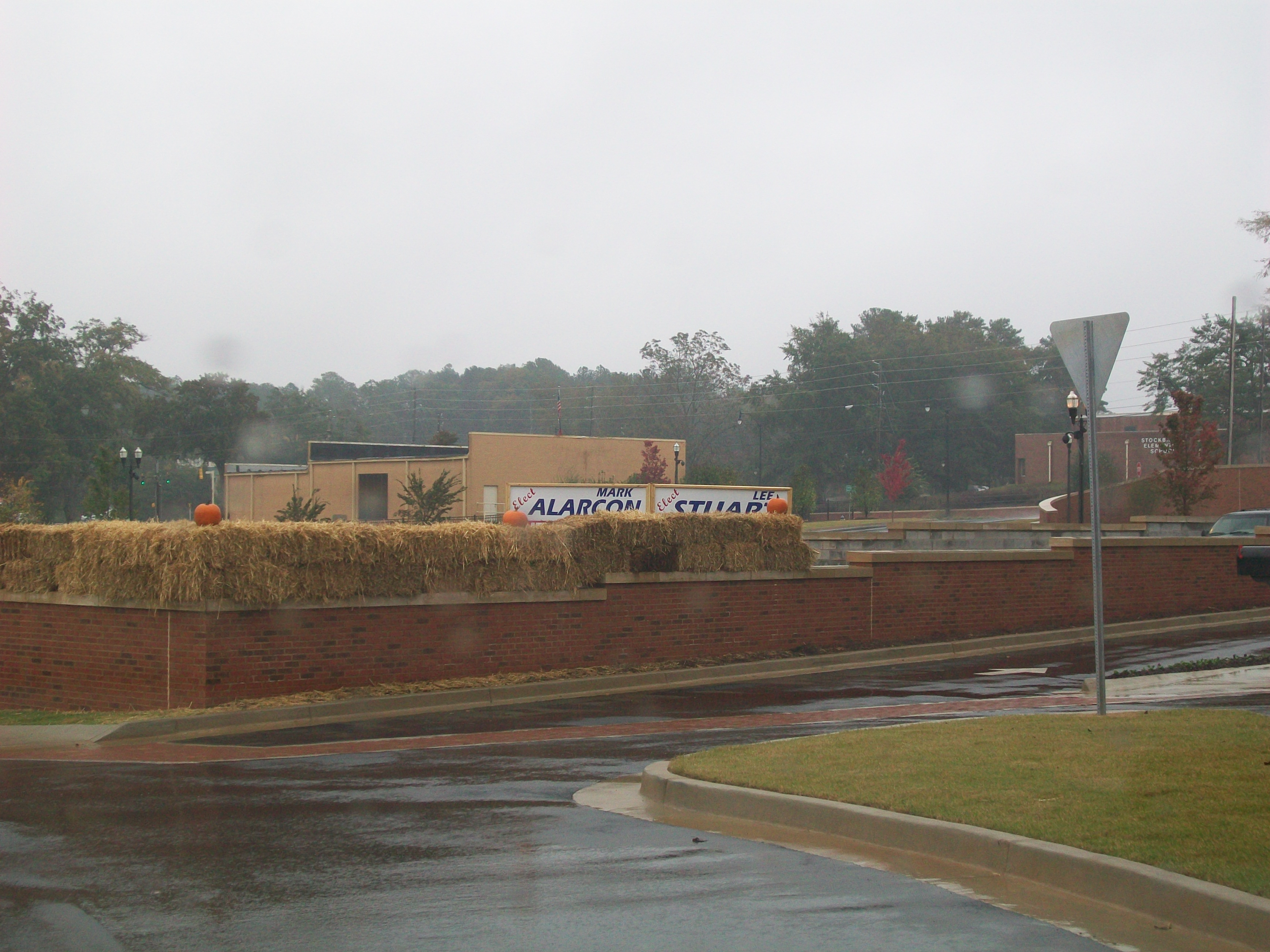
Stockbridge City Hall blocking view of opposing candidates' signs (30 October 2009)

The Henry County Board of Commissioners took a stance on the issue by unanimously approving a non-binding resolution that the county would not take land for economic development purposes. However, the county legally has no say in what the City of Stockbridge can do with its land and its use of eminent domain. Many have said this was just a political strategy, as Henry County has been shown in recent voting history to be one of the most conservative counties in the Atlanta metro area, consistently voting Republican in early 21st century presidential elections. (However, as the population grew, the county voted Democratic in the 2016 and 2020 elections.)

The conflict between the city and the property owners came to an end on February 2, 2007, as the Georgia Court of Appeals threw out the condemnation. Only one store, a local florist, beat the eminent domain and was allowed to keep its store and property. A brick fence was erected around the florist shop to separate it from the new City Hall.

==== New city hall ====
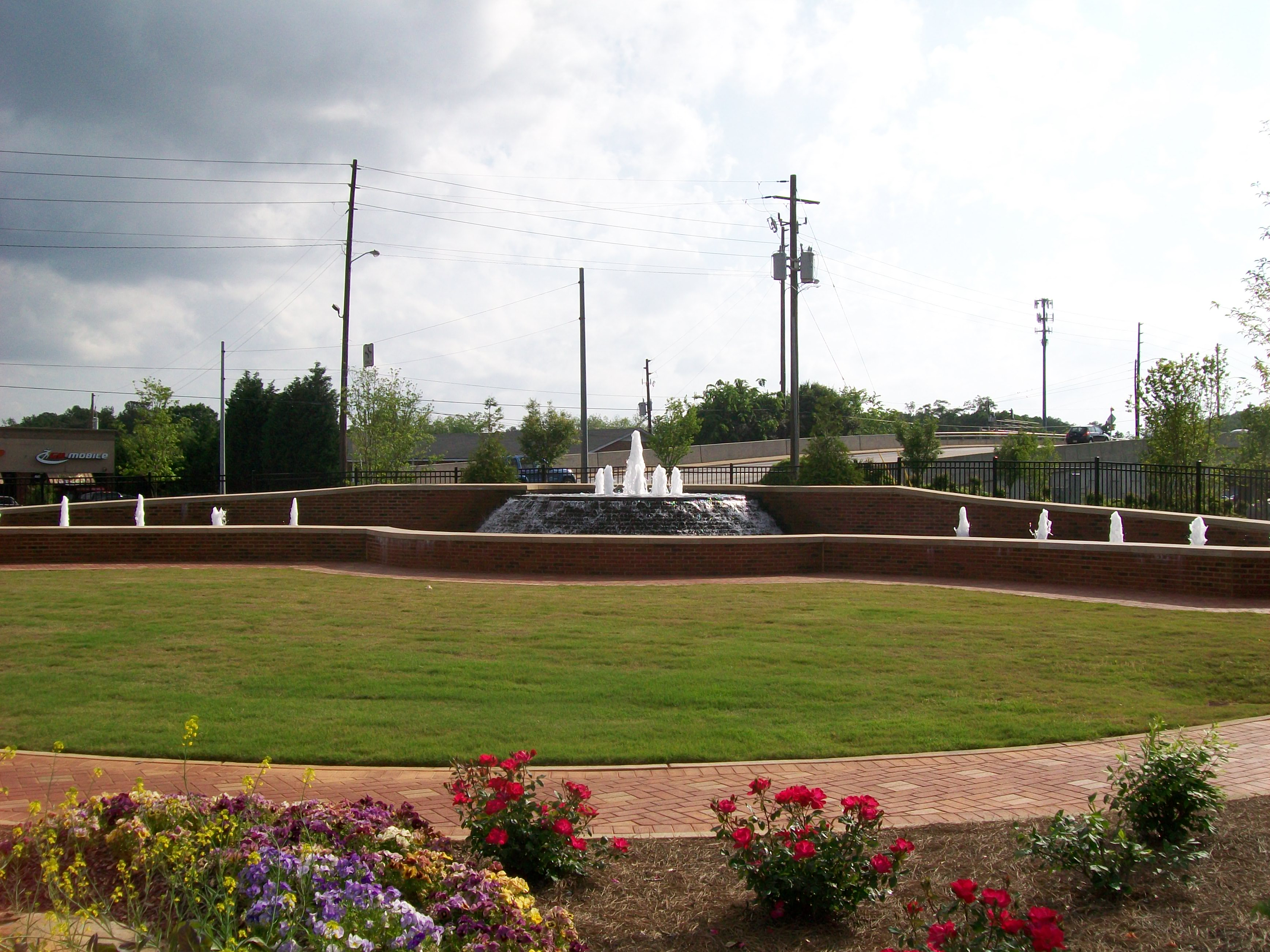
The fountain across from City Hall (01 May 2010)

After February 2007, the city had plans drawn up to build the new city hall. The plans called for the new city hall, park, and green space to be built around the florist's shop that started the now famous eminent domain lawsuit.

The city said that the new development would strengthen the old and worn-down downtown business district. Stockbridge City Manager Ted Strickland said that the new city hall was absolutely necessary, because some current city employees were working out of closets and supply rooms.

=== Secession movement ===
A group of residents in Stockbridge attempted to secede to form their own community called Eagle's Landing in the 2018 general election. The referendum was defeated.

== Geography ==
Stockbridge is located in northwestern Henry County at 33°32′3″N 84°13′52″W (33.534068, -84.231185). Its northwestern border follows the Clayton County line. Some unincorporated areas in Rockdale County have a Stockbridge mailing address, without actually being a part of the City of Stockbridge.

U.S. Route 23 is the main road through the center of the city, leading northwest 20 miles (32 km) to downtown Atlanta and southeast 9 miles (14 km) to McDonough, the Henry County seat. Interstate 75 passes through the southwest side of the city, with access from Exits 222, 224, and 228. I-75 leads northwest to Atlanta and southeast 64 miles (103 km) to Macon. Interstate 675 splits from I-75 in northwestern Stockbridge and provides access to the city from its Exit 1.

According to the United States Census Bureau, Stockbridge has a total area of 13.4 square miles (34.8 km^{2}), of which 13.3 square miles (34.5 km^{2}) are land and 0.1 square miles (0.3 km^{2}), or 0.97%, are water.

== Demographics ==
Historical population
Census	Pop.	Note	%±
1890	287		—
1920	386		—
1930	392		1.6%
1940	443		13.0%
1950	717		61.9%
1960	1,201		67.5%
1970	1,561		30.0%
1980	2,103		34.7%
1990	3,359		59.7%
2000	9,853		193.3%
2010	25,636		160.2%
2020	28,973		13.0%
2025 (est.)	36,331	▲	25.4%
U.S. Decennial Census; 1850–1870 1870–1880; 1890–1910 1920–1930; 1940 1950 1960; 1970 1980 1990; 2000 2010

=== 2020 census ===
As of the 2020 census, Stockbridge had a population of 28,973. There were 7,549 families. The median age was 35.4 years. 26.3% of residents were under the age of 18 and 10.0% of residents were 65 years of age or older. For every 100 females there were 83.3 males, and for every 100 females age 18 and over there were 77.4 males age 18 and over.

100.0% of residents lived in urban areas, while 0.0% lived in rural areas.

There were 10,462 households in Stockbridge, of which 40.2% had children under the age of 18 living in them. Of all households, 37.0% were married-couple households, 16.8% were households with a male householder and no spouse or partner present, and 40.0% were households with a female householder and no spouse or partner present. About 25.7% of all households were made up of individuals and 7.1% had someone living alone who was 65 years of age or older.

There were 11,078 housing units, of which 5.6% were vacant. The homeowner vacancy rate was 1.8% and the rental vacancy rate was 7.4%.

Stockbridge racial composition as of the 2020 census
Race	Num.	Perc.
White	3,998	13.8%
Black or African American	19,141	66.1%
American Indian and Alaska Native	139	0.5%
Asian	2,519	8.7%
Native Hawaiian and Other Pacific Islander	19	0.1%
Some other race	1,375	4.7%
Two or more races	1,782	6.2%
Hispanic or Latino (of any race)	2,513	8.7%

== Government ==
The Stockbridge city council has five council members, holding council meetings on the second Monday of each month. On November 4th, 2025, Stockbridge elected Jayden L. Williams as Mayor. Williams was recently removed from office in a three to zero vote by the City Council for misusing a city credit card and inappropriate contact with an eighteen year old boy. A city councilmember will serve as acting mayor until the office is filled by election.

== Parks and recreation ==
- Clark Community Park
- Gardner Park
- Memorial Park
- Monument Park at Eagle's Landing
- Reeves Creek Trail
- Eagles Landing Country Club
- Bridgefest – held annually on the last weekend in September
- Holiday Gala – held annually
- Sounds of Summer concert series – held annually on City Hall lawn
- Screen on the Green held annually – hosted by Stockbridge Main Street

== Education ==
=== Public schools ===
Stockbridge is served by the Henry County School District. Schools serving the Stockbridge area include:

- Cotton Indian Elementary School
- Dutchtown Elementary, Middle, and High Schools
- Eagles Landing Middle, and High Schools
- Flippen Elementary School
- Pate's Creek Elementary School
- Pleasant Grove Elementary School
- Red Oak Elementary School
- Smith Barnes Elementary School
- Stockbridge Elementary, Middle, and High Schools
- Woodland Elementary, Middle, and High Schools

=== Private schools ===
- Community Christian School
- Mount Vernon Christian Academy

== Infrastructure ==
=== Transportation ===
- Xpress GA provides local bus service.
- Berry Hill Airport is a private airport located east of town and has no scheduled air service.

Stockbridge is served by the following highways:

- Interstate 75
- Interstate 675
- U.S. Highway 23
- Georgia State Route 42
- Georgia State Route 138
- Georgia State Route 401
- Georgia State Route 413

== Notable people ==
- Joey Clanton, race car driver
- Kyle Davies, professional baseball player
- Max Gresham, stock car racing driver
- Mark Hall, lead singer of contemporary Christian band Casting Crowns
- Michael Harris II, professional baseball player
- Bruce Irvin, NFL player, Seattle Seahawks
- Martin Luther King Sr., Baptist pastor, missionary, and early leader in the American Civil Rights Movement; father of Martin Luther King Jr.
- Phil McCullough, professional baseball player
- Lee H. Phillips, awarded the Medal of Honor for his actions during the Korean War
- Dean Roland, Ed Roland, and Will Turpin of the alternative rock band Collective Soul
- Ricky Sanders, race car driver

== Media ==
- The Netflix television show Stranger Things was partially filmed in Stockbridge. Now-closed Patrick Henry High School was used for the middle and high school scenes. Smokin' Cues was also a filming location for the show.
- A scene in Furious 7, the seventh film of the Fast and Furious franchise, was filmed at the Vulcan Materials Company's rock quarry.
- Patrick Henry High School was used to film the middle school scenes of the horror film Brightburn.
- A scene from We Are Marshall was filmed at the W.D. Miller Store in Stockbridge.
