= 2025 New York Giants season =

101st season in franchise history

- Owner: John Mara; Steve Tisch
- General manager: Joe Schoen
- Head coach: Brian Daboll (fired November 10, 2–8 record); Mike Kafka (interim, 2–5 record)
- Home stadium: MetLife Stadium

Results
- Record: 4–13
- Division place: 4th NFC East
- Playoffs: Did not qualify
- All-Pros: OLB Brian Burns (2nd team)
- Pro Bowlers: OLB Brian Burns

Uniform
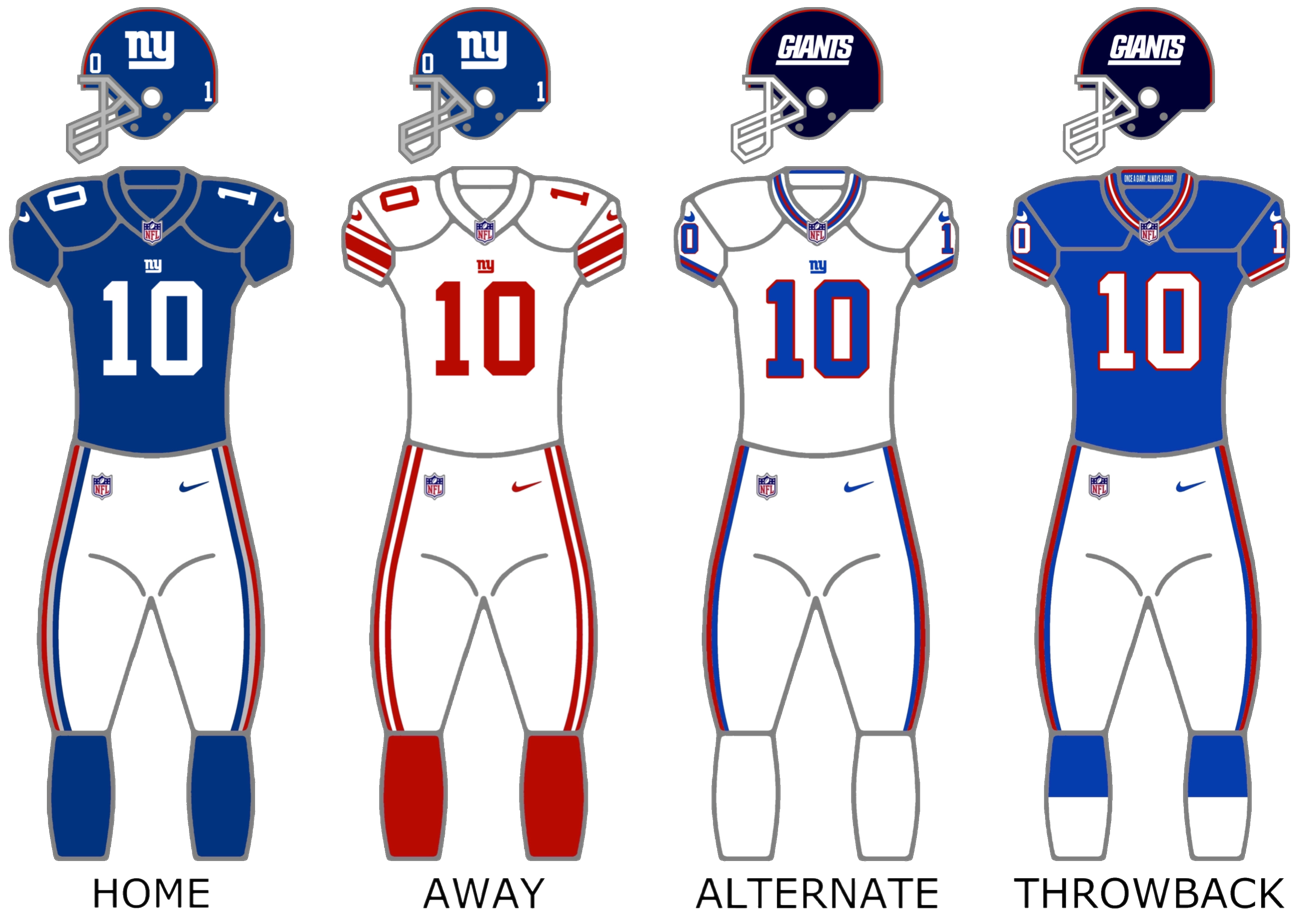

The 2025 season was the New York Giants' 101st in the National Football League (NFL), their fourth under general manager Joe Schoen, their final under the ownership tandem of John Mara and Steve Tisch, and their fourth and final under head coach Brian Daboll.

The Giants finished the 2024 season with a 3–14 record and received the third pick in the 2025 NFL draft, which they used to select Penn State linebacker Abdul Carter. They improved upon this record after upsetting their division rival Dallas Cowboys in the regular season finale. Their Week 4 upset win against the Los Angeles Chargers, their first victory of the season, was their 750th lifetime win in the club's 101 seasons. That game also saw the Giants debut their 25th overall pick in the 2025 NFL draft rookie quarterback Jaxson Dart who scored his first touchdown by rushing for 15 yards into the end zone. This was the first season since 2018 that Daniel Jones is not on the team's roster, as he was released during the 2024 season. The Giants started 2–13 for the second consecutive season and clinched a losing record for the 8th time in 9 seasons dating back to 2017, as well as extending their NFC East division title drought to 14 seasons, the longest active drought in the NFC. On November 10, following a Week 10 loss to the Chicago Bears, the Giants fired Daboll. Offensive coordinator Mike Kafka served as the team's interim head coach for the remainder of the season.

The Giants were the first team to be eliminated from playoff contention for the second consecutive season in Week 12 where they blew a 27–17 lead against the Detroit Lions and lost in overtime, 34–27, coupled with the Seattle Seahawks’ win against the Tennessee Titans, becoming the first NFL team to do this in back-to-back seasons since the Houston Texans accomplished this feat in 2021 and 2022. They missed the postseason for the third straight season in a row and the 14th time in the last 17 seasons dating back to 2009. This season was plagued by numerous injuries to key players, poor defense, and inability to close out games throughout the year that contributed to numerous blown leads and close losses (similar to 2015). Of the Giants' 13 losses, seven were determined by a single possession and in five of the remaining losses, they blew a double-digit lead. Had they won those games, they would have finished the season at 11–6.

Despite the rough season, one of the Giants’ highlights of the season included a 34-17 win in Week 6 on Thursday Night Football against their division rival and defending Super Bowl champion, the Philadelphia Eagles — their first win on Thursday Night Football since 2015.

This would also be the final season for the New York Giants with All-Pro defensive tackle Dexter Lawrence, as he was traded to the Cincinnati Bengals in exchange for the 10th overall pick in the 2026 NFL draft.

The New York Giants drew an average home attendance of 80,557, one of the highest of all American football teams in the world.

== Offseason ==
=== Free agency ===
==== Pending Free Agents as of March 2025 ====
| Position | Player | Tag | Date signed | 2025 team | Contract |
|---|---|---|---|---|---|
| CB | Adoree' Jackson | UFA | March 14 | Philadelphia Eagles | 1 year |
| S | Jason Pinnock | UFA | March 12 | San Francisco 49ers | 1 year |
| LB | Patrick Johnson | UFA | March 14 | Philadelphia Eagles | 1 year |
| LB | Azeez Ojulari | UFA | March 17 | Philadelphia Eagles | 1 year |
| LB | Isaiah Simmons | UFA | April 30 | Green Bay Packers | 1 year |
| QB | Tim Boyle | UFA | March 26 | Tennessee Titans | |
| QB | Drew Lock | UFA | April 15 | Seattle Seahawks | 2 years |
| QB | Tommy DeVito | UFA | March 8 | | 1 year, $855,000 |
| RG | Aaron Stinnie | UFA | March 13 | | 1 year |
| LS | Casey Kreiter | UFA | March 5 | | 1 year, $1,422,500 million |
| WR | Darius Slayton | UFA | March 13 | | 3 years, $36 million |
| P | Jamie Gillan | UFA | March 8 | | 3 years, $9 million |
| TE | Chris Manhertz | UFA | March 8 | | 1 year, $1,197,500 million |
| RG | Greg Van Roten | UFA | March 12 | | 1 year |
| WR | Gunner Olszewski | UFA | March 12 | | 1 year |
| WR | Ihmir Smith-Marsette | UFA | March 12 | | 1 year |
| LB | Tomon Fox | ERFA | March 7 | | 1 year |
| LB | Dyontae Johnson | ERFA | March 12 | | 1 year |
| LB | Ty Summers | UFA | March 31 | | 1 Year |
| LB | Matthew Adams | UFA | March 31 | re-sign | 1 year |
| OT | Chris Hubbard | UFA | March 31 | re-sign | 1 year |
| DE | Elijah Riley | UFA | March 31 | re-sign | 1 year |
| CB | Greg Stroman | UFA | March 31 | re sign | 1 year |
| DT | Armon Watts | UFA | March 31 | re-sign | 1 year |
| CB | Divaad Wilson | UFA | March 31 | re-sign | 1 year |

| Player re-signed by the Giants | Player signed by another team | Retired |

==== 2025 Free Agent Signings ====
| Position | Player | Tag | Date signed | 2024 team | Contract |
|---|---|---|---|---|---|
| DT | Roy Robertson-Harris | UFA | March 10 | Seattle Seahawks | 2 years, $10 million |
| CB | Paulson Adebo | UFA | March 13 | New Orleans Saints | 3 years, $54 million |
| S | Jevon Holland | UFA | March 13 | Miami Dolphins | 3 years, $45 million |
| DL | Chauncey Golston | UFA | March 13 | Dallas Cowboys | 3 years, $19 million |
| LB | Chris Board | UFA | March 13 | Baltimore Ravens | 2 years, $6 million |
| OT | James Hudson | UFA | March 13 | Cleveland Browns | 2 years, $11 million |
| OT | Stone Forsythe | UFA | March 13 | Seattle Seahawks | 1 year |
| LB | Demetrius Flannigan-Fowles | UFA | March 14 | San Francisco 49ers | 1 year |
| DT | Jeremiah Ledbetter | UFA | March 14 | Jacksonville Jaguars | 1 year |
| LB | Victor Dimukeje | UFA | March 18 | Arizona Cardinals | 1 year |
| WR | Lil'Jordan Humphrey | UFA | March 21 | Denver Broncos | 1 year |
| WR | Zach Pascal | UFA | March 22 | Arizona Cardinals | 1 year |
| QB | Jameis Winston | UFA | March 22 | Cleveland Browns | 2 years, $8 million |
| QB | Russell Wilson | UFA | March 25 | Pittsburgh Steelers | 1 year, $21 million |

=== Draft ===
2025 New York Giants draft selections
| Round | Selection | Player | Position | College | Notes |
|---|---|---|---|---|---|
| 1 | 3 | Abdul Carter | DE | Penn State | |
| 1 | 25 | Jaxson Dart | QB | Ole Miss | From Texans (Note: The Giants traded a second-round selection (34th overall) and a third-round selection (99th overall) to the Houston Texans in exchange for the 25th overall pick, which the Giants used to select quarterback Jaxson Dart.) |
| 2 | 34 | Traded to the Houston Texans | | | |
| 3 | 65 | Darius Alexander | DT | Toledo | |
| 3 | 99 | Traded to the Houston Texans | | | Compensatory pick |
| 4 | 105 | Cam Skattebo | RB | Arizona State | |
| 5 | 140 | Traded to the Carolina Panthers (Note: The Giants traded a conditional fifth-round selection, and 2024 second- and fifth-round selections to the Carolina Panthers in exchange for a 2024 fifth-round selection and LB Brian Burns.) | | | |
| 5 | 154 | Marcus Mbow | G | Purdue | From Seahawks (Note: The Giants traded DE Leonard Williams to the Seattle Seahawks in exchange for a fifth-round selection and a 2024 second-round selection.) |
| 6 | 177 | Traded to the Buffalo Bills (Note: The Giants traded a sixth-round selection to the Buffalo Bills in exchange for a seventh-round selection and LB Carlos Basham Jr.) | | | |
| 7 | 219 | Thomas Fidone | TE | Nebraska | |
| 7 | 246 | Korie Black | CB | Oklahoma State | From Bills |

2025 New York Giants Undrafted Free Agents
| Name | Position | College | Ref. |
|---|---|---|---|
| Rushawn Baker | RB | Elon | |
| Jordan Bly | WR | Gardner–Webb | |
| Dalen Cambre | WR | Louisiana | |
| Beaux Collins | WR | Notre Dame | |
| R. J. Delancy III | CB | Wisconsin | |
| Da'Quan Felton | WR | Virginia Tech | |
| Trace Ford | DE | Oklahoma | |
| O'Donnell Fortune | CB | South Carolina | |
| Nate McCollum | WR | North Carolina | |
| Tommy McCormick | S | Idaho | |
| T. J. Moore | CB | Mercer | |
| Makari Paige | S | Michigan | |
| Jermaine Terry II | TE | Oregon State | |
| Antwane Wells Jr. | WR | Ole Miss | |
| Jaison Williams | OT | Youngstown State | |

Draft trades

== Personnel ==
=== Staff ===
2025 New York Giants staff
| Front office: President/CEO – John Mara; Chairman/executive vice president – Steve Tisch; Senior vice president & general manager – Joe Schoen; Assistant general manager – Brandon Brown; Senior vice president of football operations & strategy – Kevin Abrams; Senior player personnel executive, board director – Chris Mara; Director of player personnel – Tim McDonnell; Assistant director of player personnel – Dennis Hickey; Director of pro scouting – Chris Rosetti; Assistant director of pro scouting – Nick La Testa; Director of football operations – Ed Triggs; Director of coaching operations – Laura Young; Head coaches: Head coach – Brian Daboll (fired November 10, 2–8 record); Interim head coach – Mike Kafka; Offensive coaches: Offensive coordinator/tight ends – Tim Kelly; Quarterbacks/passing game coordinator – Shea Tierney; Assistant quarterbacks – Chad Hall; Running backs – Ladell Betts; Wide receivers – Mike Groh; Offensive line – Carmen Bricillo; Assistant offensive line – James Ferentz; Offensive assistant/game manager – Cade Knox; Offensive assistant/minority coaching fellow – Troy Brown | Defensive coaches: Interim defensive coordinator/outside linebackers – Charlie Bullen; Defensive line – Andre Patterson; Inside linebackers – John Egorugwu; Defensive backs/pass game coordinator – Marquand Manuel; Cornerbacks – Jeff Burris; Assistant secondary – Mike Adams; Defensive assistant – Steve Ferentz; Defensive assistant – Grant Morgan; Special teams coaches: Special teams coordinator – Michael Ghobrial; Assistant special teams – Cam Achord; Assistant special teams – Stephen Thomas; Strength and conditioning: Executive director of player performance – Aaron Wellman; Director of performance/assistant strength and conditioning – Sam Coad; Director of strength and conditioning – Drew Wilson; Assistant strength and conditioning – Chris Allen; Assistant strength and conditioning – Mark Loecher; Assistant strength and conditioning – Mark Naylor |

=== Final roster ===
2025 New York Giants roster
| Quarterbacks (QB): 6 Jaxson Dart; 3 Russell Wilson; 19 Jameis Winston; Running backs (RB): 20 Eric Gray; 25 Dante Miller; 26 Devin Singletary; 29 Tyrone Tracy Jr.; Wide receivers (WR): 83 Dalen Cambre; 88 Xavier Gipson; 89 Isaiah Hodgins; 13 Jalin Hyatt; 9 Ryan Miller; 80 Gunner Olszewski; 18 Darius Slayton; Tight ends (TE): 82 Daniel Bellinger; 84 Theo Johnson; 85 Chris Manhertz | Offensive linemen (OL): 72 Jermaine Eluemunor RT; 60 Bryan Hudson C; 55 James Hudson LT; 71 Marcus Mbow RT; 76 Jon Runyan Jr. LG; 65 Austin Schlottmann C; 64 Aaron Stinnie LG; 74 Greg Van Roten RG; Defensive linemen (DL): 91 Darius Alexander DE; 94 Elijah Chatman DE; 57 Chauncey Golston DE; 97 Dexter Lawrence NT; 95 Roy Robertson-Harris DE | Linebackers (LB): 46 Zaire Barnes ILB; 0 Brian Burns OLB; 51 Abdul Carter OLB; 33 Demetrius Flannigan-Fowles ILB; 45 Tomon Fox OLB; 47 Neville Hewitt ILB; 53 Darius Muasau ILB; 37 Caleb Murphy OLB; 58 Bobby Okereke ILB; Defensive backs (DB): 21 Paulson Adebo CB; 2 Deonte Banks CB; 24 Dane Belton SS; 35 Jarrick Bernard-Converse CB; 38 Korie Black CB; 34 Beau Brade FS; 23 Art Green CB; 8 Jevon Holland FS; 43 Raheem Layne S; 36 Rico Payton CB; 22 Dru Phillips CB; Special teams (ST): 12 Jamie Gillan P; 59 Casey Kreiter LS; 30 Ben Sauls K | Practice squad: 54 Swayze Bozeman ILB; 48 Tanner Conner TE; 39 Zach Davidson TE; 48 Trace Ford OLB; 67 Reid Holskey RT; 63 Jake Kubas G; 49 Maximilian Mang TE (IPP); 15 Patrick McMorris S; -- Myles Purchase CB; 99 Casey Rogers DE; 87 Ihmir Smith-Marsette WR; Reserve: 49 Chris Board ILB (IR); 81 Beaux Collins WR (IR/DFR); 98 DJ Davidson NT (IR); 52 Victor Dimukeje OLB (IR); 75 Joshua Ezeudu G (IR/DFR); 83 Da'Quan Felton WR (IR); 86 Thomas Fidone TE (IR); 28 Cor'Dale Flott CB (IR); 88 Bryce Ford-Wheaton WR (IR); 9 Graham Gano K (IR); 15 Anthony Johnson Jr. S (PUP); 31 Nic Jones CB (IR); 41 Micah McFadden ILB (IR); 30 T. J. Moore CB (IR); 1 Malik Nabers WR (IR); 73 Evan Neal RG (IR/DFR); 27 Tyler Nubin SS (IR); 93 Rakeem Nuñez-Roches DE (IR); 17 Wan'Dale Robinson WR (IR); 61 John Michael Schmitz C (IR); 44 Cam Skattebo RB (IR); 5 Kayvon Thibodeaux OLB (IR); 78 Andrew Thomas LT (IR); Rookies in italics 53 active, 23 reserve, 11 practice squad |

== Preseason ==
| Week | Date | Opponent | Result | Record | Venue | Recap |
|---|---|---|---|---|---|---|
| 1 | August 9 | at Buffalo Bills | W 34–25 | 1–0 | Highmark Stadium | Recap |
| 2 | August 16 | New York Jets | W 31–12 | 2–0 | MetLife Stadium | Recap |
| 3 | August 21 | New England Patriots | W 42–10 | 3–0 | MetLife Stadium | Recap |

== Regular season ==
=== Schedule ===
| Week | Date | Opponent | Result | Record | Venue | Recap |
|---|---|---|---|---|---|---|
| 1 | September 7 | at **Washington Commanders** | **L** 6–21 | 0–1 | Northwest Stadium | Recap |
| 2 | September 14 | at **Dallas Cowboys** | **L** 37–40 (OT) | 0–2 | AT&T Stadium | Recap |
| 3 | September 21 | Kansas City Chiefs | **L** 9–22 | 0–3 | MetLife Stadium | Recap |
| 4 | September 28 | Los Angeles Chargers | **W** 21–18 | 1–3 | MetLife Stadium | Recap |
| 5 | October 5 | at New Orleans Saints | **L** 14–26 | 1–4 | Caesars Superdome | Recap |
| 6 | October 9 | **Philadelphia Eagles** | **W** 34–17 | 2–4 | MetLife Stadium | Recap |
| 7 | October 19 | at Denver Broncos | **L** 32–33 | 2–5 | Empower Field at Mile High | Recap |
| 8 | October 26 | at **Philadelphia Eagles** | **L** 20–38 | 2–6 | Lincoln Financial Field | Recap |
| 9 | November 2 | San Francisco 49ers | **L** 24–34 | 2–7 | MetLife Stadium | Recap |
| 10 | November 9 | at Chicago Bears | **L** 20–24 | 2–8 | Soldier Field | Recap |
| 11 | November 16 | Green Bay Packers | **L** 20–27 | 2–9 | MetLife Stadium | Recap |
| 12 | November 23 | at Detroit Lions | **L** 27–34 (OT) | 2–10 | Ford Field | Recap |
| 13 | December 1 | at New England Patriots | **L** 15–33 | 2–11 | Gillette Stadium | Recap |
| 14 | Bye | | | | | |
| 15 | December 14 | **Washington Commanders** | **L** 21–29 | 2–12 | MetLife Stadium | Recap |
| 16 | December 21 | Minnesota Vikings | **L** 13–16 | 2–13 | MetLife Stadium | Recap |
| 17 | December 28 | at Las Vegas Raiders | **W** 34–10 | 3–13 | Allegiant Stadium | Recap |
| 18 | January 4 | **Dallas Cowboys** | **W** 34–17 | 4–13 | MetLife Stadium | Recap |

Note: Intra-division opponents are in bold text.

=== Game summaries ===
==== Week 1: at Washington Commanders ====
Week 1: New York Giants at Washington Commanders – Game summary

| Quarter | 1 | 2 | 3 | 4 | Total |
|---|---|---|---|---|---|
| Giants | 0 | 3 | 3 | 0 | **6** |
| **Commanders** | 7 | 7 | 0 | 7 | **21** |

at Northwest Stadium, Landover, Maryland

- Date: September 7
- Game time: 1:00 p.m. EDT
- Game weather: Mostly cloudy, 68 °F (20 °C)
- Game attendance: 64,544
- Referee: Clay Martin
- TV announcers (Fox): Kevin Burkhardt, Tom Brady, Erin Andrews and Tom Rinaldi
- Recap, Game Book

Game information

**First quarter**

- WAS – Zach Ertz 7-yard pass from Jayden Daniels (Matt Gay kick), 7:00. Commanders 7–0. **Drive: 8 plays, 89 yards, 4:02.**

**Second quarter**

- NYG – Graham Gano 21-yard field goal, 13:57. Commanders 7–3. **Drive: 16 plays, 76 yards, 8:03.**
- WAS – Jacory Croskey-Merritt 6-yard run (Matt Gay kick), 6:14. Commanders 14–3. **Drive: 8 plays, 58 yards, 5:26.**

**Third quarter**

- NYG – Graham Gano 55-yard field goal, 1:43. Commanders 14–6. **Drive: 12 plays, 43 yards, 5:21.**

**Fourth quarter**

- WAS – Deebo Samuel 19-yard run (Matt Gay kick), 7:09. Commanders 21–6. **Drive: 9 plays, 80 yards, 4:57.**

**Top passers**

- NYG – Russell Wilson – 17/37, 168 yards
- WAS – Jayden Daniels – 19/30, 266 yards, TD

**Top rushers**

- NYG – Russell Wilson – 8 rushes, 44 yards
- WAS – Jacory Croskey-Merritt – 10 rushes, 82 yards, TD

**Top receivers**

- NYG – Malik Nabers – 5 receptions, 71 yards
- WAS – Deebo Samuel – 7 receptions, 77 yards

The Giants failed to score a touchdown in Week 1 for the third consecutive season, becoming the first team to do so since the Detroit Lions from 1940-1942. Left tackle Andrew Thomas was ruled out prior to the game due to his foot injury that sidelined him for most of the previous season, and his absence was felt as Russell Wilson was under duress the entire afternoon. The Giants' run game was also stymied all day, only gaining 74 yards on the ground compared to the Commanders' 220.

The Giants ran a total of 13 plays in goal-to-go range and were unable to punch it in at any point. This marked the first time since 1979 that the Giants failed to score a touchdown in an away game against the Commanders as well as the first time the Giants lost three or more games in a row to the Commanders since losing four straight against them from 1998-2000. In addition, this was the Giants' 7th consecutive divisional loss. Also with the loss, the Giants started 0-1 for the third straight year in a row and eighth time in nine seasons.

==== Week 2: at Dallas Cowboys ====
Week 2: New York Giants at Dallas Cowboys – Game summary

| Quarter | 1 | 2 | 3 | 4 | OT | Total |
|---|---|---|---|---|---|---|
| Giants | 6 | 7 | 3 | 21 | 0 | **37** |
| **Cowboys** | 0 | 10 | 7 | 20 | 3 | **40** |

at AT&T Stadium, Arlington, Texas

- Date: September 14
- Game time: 1:00 p.m. EDT/12:00 p.m. CDT
- Game weather: None (retractable roof closed)
- Game attendance: 92,781
- Referee: Bill Vinovich
- TV announcers (Fox): Joe Davis, Greg Olsen and Pam Oliver
- Recap, Game Book

Game information

**First quarter**

- NYG – Graham Gano 38-yard field goal, 6:11. Giants 3–0. **Drive: 16 plays, 60 yards, 8:49.**
- NYG – Graham Gano 33-yard field goal, 1:05. Giants 6–0. **Drive: 8 plays, 55 yards, 3:42.**

**Second quarter**

- DAL – Brandon Aubrey 51-yard field goal, 8:25. Giants 6–3. **Drive: 8 plays, 42 yards, 3:49.**
- NYG – Malik Nabers 29-yard pass from Russell Wilson (Graham Gano kick), 5:37. Giants 13–3. **Drive: 5 plays, 70 yards, 2:48.**
- DAL – KaVontae Turpin 10-yard pass from Dak Prescott (Brandon Aubrey kick), 2:11. Giants 13–10. **Drive: 8 plays, 64 yards, 3:26.**

**Third quarter**

- DAL – Javonte Williams 30-yard run (Brandon Aubrey kick), 7:20. Cowboys 17–13. **Drive: 6 plays, 90 yards, 3:00.**
- NYG – Graham Gano 33-yard field goal, 5:38. Cowboys 17–16. **Drive: 5 plays, 52 yards, 1:42.**

**Fourth quarter**

- DAL – Brandon Aubrey 44-yard field goal, 14:13. Cowboys 20–16. **Drive: 11 plays, 56 yards, 6:25.**
- NYG – Cam Skattebo 1-yard run (Graham Gano kick), 12:07. Giants 23–20. **Drive: 4 plays, 60 yards, 2:06.**
- DAL – Miles Sanders 4-yard run (Brandon Aubrey kick), 6:14. Cowboys 27–23. **Drive: 10 plays, 85 yards, 5:53.**
- NYG – Wan'Dale Robinson 32-yard pass from Russell Wilson (Graham Gano kick), 2:44. Giants 30–27. **Drive: 7 plays, 63 yards, 3:30.**
- DAL – George Pickens 6-yard pass from Dak Prescott (Brandon Aubrey kick), 0:52. Cowboys 34–30. **Drive: 11 plays, 71 yards, 1:52.**
- NYG – Malik Nabers 48-yard pass from Russell Wilson (Graham Gano kick), 0:25. Giants 37–34. **Drive: 3 plays, 63 yards, 0:27.**
- DAL – Brandon Aubrey 64-yard field goal, 0:00. Tied 37–37. **Drive: 4 plays, 21 yards, 0:25.**

**Overtime**

- DAL – Brandon Aubrey 46-yard field goal, 0:00. Cowboys 40–37. **Drive: 4 plays, 42 yards, 2:00.**

**Top passers**

- NYG – Russell Wilson – 30/41, 450 yards, 3 TD, INT
- DAL – Dak Prescott – 38/52, 361 yards, 2 TD, INT

**Top rushers**

- NYG – Cam Skattebo – 11 rushes, 45 yards, TD
- DAL – Javonte Williams – 18 rushes, 97 yards, TD

**Top receivers**

- NYG – Malik Nabers – 9 receptions, 167 yards, 2 TD
- DAL – CeeDee Lamb – 9 receptions, 112 yards

Despite a very strong offensive performance in the second half, numerous penalties and mishaps would ultimately cost the Giants the game. The Giants drew 21 total flags and were penalized 14 times for a franchise-record 160 yards. On their opening drive after a flag wiped off a 67-yard return for Gunner Olszewski, left tackle James Hudson III committed four penalties, the most for a player on a single drive since 2000. His fourth penalty was especially costly as Wan'Dale Robinson caught a pass for 51 yards and was downed at the 2-yard line, but then Hudson was called for a personal foul after the play which brought the ball 15 yards back to the 17. The Giants then had to settle for a field goal to end that drive. Hudson was subsequently benched and replaced with Marcus Mbow on the next drive.

The Giants scored four touchdowns in the game but only once in the red zone in five attempts, when rookie running back Cam Skattebo scored his first NFL touchdown. This came right after rookie quarterback Jaxson Dart made his NFL debut early in the fourth quarter, handing the ball off to Skattebo who ran the ball 24 yards to the Cowboys' 1-yard line right before scoring on the next play.

Down 34–30, Russell Wilson found Malik Nabers for a 48-yard go-ahead touchdown with 25 seconds to go in the fourth quarter, Nabers' second touchdown of the game. However, Cowboys kicker Brandon Aubrey would kick a game-tying 64-yard field goal as the clock expired, sending the game into overtime.

After both teams exchanged possessions in overtime, Wilson threw an interception to Cowboys safety Donovan Wilson, and Aubrey would kick the game-winning 46-yard field goal with four seconds left on the clock, handing the Giants their 9th consecutive loss to the Cowboys dating back to 2021, the longest active streak in the NFL among division opponents, as well as their 9th consecutive road loss to the Cowboys, going back to 2017. With the loss, they started 0-2 for the second straight year and the 11th time in the last 13 seasons dating back to 2013. Additionally, this marked the first time since 2005 that a Giants-Cowboys game went to overtime.

==== Week 3: vs. Kansas City Chiefs ====
Week 3: Kansas City Chiefs at New York Giants – Game summary

| Quarter | 1 | 2 | 3 | 4 | Total |
|---|---|---|---|---|---|
| **Chiefs** | 3 | 6 | 7 | 6 | **22** |
| Giants | 0 | 6 | 0 | 3 | **9** |

at MetLife Stadium, East Rutherford, New Jersey

- Date: September 21
- Game time: 8:20 p.m. EDT
- Game weather: Fair, 65 °F (18 °C)
- Game attendance: 80,690
- Referee: Land Clark
- TV announcers (NBC): Mike Tirico, Cris Collinsworth and Melissa Stark
- Recap, Game Book

Game information

**First quarter**

- KC – Harrison Butker 54-yard field goal, 3:45. Chiefs 3–0. **Drive: 12 plays, 36 yards, 5:21.**

**Second quarter**

- KC – Harrison Butker 48-yard field goal, 9:48. Chiefs 6–0. **Drive: 9 plays, 51 yards, 5:23.**
- NYG – Cam Skattebo 13-yard run (kick blocked), 1:44. Tied 6–6. **Drive: 8 plays, 70 yards, 3:40.**
- KC – Harrison Butker 28-yard field goal, 0:00. Chiefs 9–6. **Drive: 7 plays, 69 yards, 0:49.**

**Third quarter**

- KC – Tyquan Thornton 5-yard pass from Patrick Mahomes (Harrison Butker kick), 8:22. Chiefs 16–6. **Drive: 11 plays, 74 yards, 6:38.**

**Fourth quarter**

- NYG – Graham Gano 25-yard field goal, 10:12. Chiefs 16–9. **Drive: 12 plays, 73 yards, 5:57.**
- KC – Kareem Hunt 1-yard run (kick failed), 6:03. Chiefs 22–9. **Drive: 9 plays, 77 yards, 4:09.**

**Top passers**

- KC – Patrick Mahomes – 22/37, 224 yards, TD
- NYG – Russell Wilson – 18/32, 160 yards, 2 INT

**Top rushers**

- KC – Isiah Pacheco – 10 rushes, 45 yards
- NYG – Cam Skattebo – 10 rushes, 60 yards, TD

**Top receivers**

- KC – Tyquan Thornton – 5 receptions, 71 yards, TD
- NYG – Cam Skattebo – 6 receptions, 61 yards

Andrew Thomas made his season debut (on a limited snap count), but the Giants' offense was lackluster, converting just once on 3rd down in ten attempts. Malik Nabers was held in check, only having two receptions for 13 yards.

Cam Skattebo scored the only Giants touchdown on the night and recorded over 120 total scrimmage yards. However, punter Jamie Gillan attempted the extra point after the touchdown, and the kick was blocked (it was announced that kicker Graham Gano had suffered a groin injury during the pregame and he did not appear until the fourth quarter).

With this loss, the Giants started 0–3 for the first time since 2021. The Giants also recorded their first ever home loss to the Chiefs, ending a seven-game home winning streak against them.

==== Week 4: vs. Los Angeles Chargers ====
Week 4: Los Angeles Chargers at New York Giants – Game summary

| Quarter | 1 | 2 | 3 | 4 | Total |
|---|---|---|---|---|---|
| Chargers | 0 | 10 | 8 | 0 | **18** |
| **Giants** | 7 | 6 | 8 | 0 | **21** |

at MetLife Stadium, East Rutherford, New Jersey

- Date: September 28
- Game time: 1:00 p.m. EDT
- Game weather: Fair, 81 °F (27 °C)
- Game attendance: 81,954
- Referee: Shawn Hochuli
- TV announcers (CBS): Kevin Harlan, Trent Green and Melanie Collins
- Recap, Game Book

Game information

**First quarter**

- NYG – Jaxson Dart 15-yard run (Jude McAtamney kick), 9:20. Giants 7–0. **Drive: 9 plays, 89 yards, 4:17.**

**Second quarter**

- NYG – Jude McAtamney 22-yard field goal, 13:47. Giants 10–0. **Drive: 4 plays, -1 yard, 1:46.**
- LAC – Cameron Dicker 43-yard field goal, 8:06. Giants 10–3. **Drive: 10 plays, 40 yards, 5:41.**
- NYG – Jude McAtamney 31-yard field goal, 1:52. Giants 13–3. **Drive: 15 plays, 47 yards, 6:14.**
- LAC – Quentin Johnston 36-yard pass from Justin Herbert (Cameron Dicker kick), 0:27. Giants 13–10. **Drive: 8 plays, 75 yards, 1:25.**

**Third quarter**

- NYG – Theo Johnson 3-yard pass from Jaxson Dart (Cam Skattebo run), 2:49. Giants 21–10. **Drive: 2 plays, 3 yards, 0:44.**
- LAC – Omarion Hampton 54-yard run (Justin Herbert run), 1:27. Giants 21–18. **Drive: 3 plays, 66 yards, 1:22.**

**Fourth quarter**

- No scoring plays

**Top passers**

- LAC – Justin Herbert – 23/41, 203 yards, TD, 2 INT
- NYG – Jaxson Dart – 13/20, 111 yards, TD

**Top rushers**

- LAC – Omarion Hampton – 12 rushes, 128 yards, TD
- NYG – Cam Skattebo – 25 rushes, 79 yards

**Top receivers**

- LAC – Quentin Johnston – 8 receptions, 98 yards, TD
- NYG – Darius Slayton – 3 receptions, 44 yards

Rookie quarterback Jaxson Dart made his first career start and scored his first NFL touchdown on a 15-yard run to cap off the Giants opening drive. He later recorded his first passing touchdown, a 3-yard shovel pass to tight end Theo Johnson, after cornerback Dru Phillips set the Giants up with a 56-yard interception that was returned to the 3-yard line of the Chargers. Dexter Lawrence recorded his first career interception earlier in the game and brought the ball down to the 4-yard line of the Chargers, which resulted in a field goal after the Giants offense stalled.

With the upset win, the Giants improved to 1–3, recording their 750th victory in franchise history. It was the Giants' first win over the Chargers since the 1998 season and their first home win against the Chargers since the 1986 season.

Despite the victory, Malik Nabers suffered a knee injury in the second quarter that was later confirmed to be a torn ACL, ending his season.

==== Week 5: at New Orleans Saints ====
Week 5: New York Giants at New Orleans Saints – Game summary

| Quarter | 1 | 2 | 3 | 4 | Total |
|---|---|---|---|---|---|
| Giants | 7 | 7 | 0 | 0 | **14** |
| **Saints** | 3 | 13 | 3 | 7 | **26** |

at Caesars Superdome, New Orleans, Louisiana

- Date: October 5
- Game time: 1:00 p.m. EDT/12:00 p.m. CDT
- Game weather: None (indoor stadium)
- Game attendance: 70,008
- Referee: Alan Eck
- TV announcers (CBS): Andrew Catalon, Charles Davis, Jason McCourty and A.J Ross
- Recap, Game Book

Game information

**First quarter**

- NYG – Theo Johnson 1-yard pass from Jaxson Dart (Jude McAtamney kick), 9:34. Giants 7–0. **Drive: 8 plays, 59 yards, 4:05.**
- NO – Blake Grupe 28-yard field goal, 1:40. Giants 7–3. **Drive: 14 plays, 70 yards, 7:54.**

**Second quarter**

- NYG – Theo Johnson 15-yard pass from Jaxson Dart (Jude McAtamney kick), 13:01. Giants 14–3. **Drive: 8 plays, 70 yards, 3:39.**
- NO – Blake Grupe 53-yard field goal, 7:41. Giants 14–6. **Drive: 12 plays, 49 yards, 5:20.**
- NO – Rashid Shaheed 87-yard pass from Spencer Rattler (Blake Grupe kick), 5:16. Giants 14–13. **Drive: 1 play, 87 yards, 0:11.**
- NO – Blake Grupe 29-yard field goal, 0:00. Saints 16–14. **Drive: 8 plays, 30 yards, 1:02.**

**Third quarter**

- NO – Blake Grupe 28-yard field goal, 6:55. Saints 19–14. **Drive: 10 plays, 45 yards, 3:57.**

**Fourth quarter**

- NO – Jordan Howden 86-yard fumble recovery (Blake Grupe kick), 14:47. Saints 26–14.

**Top passers**

- NYG – Jaxson Dart – 26/40, 202 yards, 2 TD, 2 INT
- NO – Spencer Rattler – 21/31, 225 yards, TD

**Top rushers**

- NYG – Cam Skattebo – 15 rushes, 59 yards
- NO – Kendre Miller – 10 rushes, 41 yards

**Top receivers**

- NYG – Daniel Bellinger – 4 receptions, 52 yards
- NO – Rashid Shaheed – 4 receptions, 114 yards, TD

Jaxson Dart threw two touchdown passes to Theo Johnson to end each of the Giants' first two drives. However, the Giants were then plagued by miscues throughout the afternoon. They turned the ball over on five consecutive possessions for the first time since Week 11 of the 2014 season. Dart threw two interceptions and lost a fumble, with Darius Slayton and Cam Skattebo also fumbling to account for the five turnovers. Additionally, Dart missed a huge opportunity to connect with Slayton, likely for a touchdown, on a flea-flicker late in the second quarter. The pass was dropped by Slayton, resulting in an incompletion and forcing the Giants to punt right after.

With their third straight loss to the Saints since 2023, the Giants dropped to 1–4 while suffering their eighth consecutive loss on the road, their longest streak since the 2012-2013 seasons. This game gave the Saints their first victory of the season and Kellen Moore his first victory as an NFL head coach.

==== Week 6: vs. Philadelphia Eagles ====
Week 6: Philadelphia Eagles at New York Giants – Game summary

| Quarter | 1 | 2 | 3 | 4 | Total |
|---|---|---|---|---|---|
| Eagles | 10 | 7 | 0 | 0 | **17** |
| **Giants** | 13 | 7 | 7 | 7 | **34** |

at MetLife Stadium, East Rutherford, New Jersey

- Date: October 9
- Game time: 8:15 p.m. EDT
- Game weather: Fair, 53 °F (12 °C)
- Game attendance: 81,564
- Referee: Clete Blakeman
- TV announcers (Prime Video): Al Michaels, Kirk Herbstreit and Kaylee Hartung
- Recap, Game Book

Game information

**First quarter**

- PHI – Jake Elliott 42-yard field goal, 11:59. Eagles 3–0. **Drive: 6 plays, 36 yards, 3:01.**
- NYG – Jaxson Dart 20-yard run (Jude McAtamney kick), 9:59. Giants 7–3. **Drive: 6 plays, 54 yards, 2:00.**
- NYG – Wan'Dale Robinson 35-yard pass from Jaxson Dart (kick failed), 5:37. Giants 13–3. **Drive: 4 plays, 66 yards, 2:02.**
- PHI – Dallas Goedert 3-yard pass from Jalen Hurts (Jake Elliott kick), 1:49. Giants 13–10. **Drive: 8 plays, 75 yards, 3:48.**

**Second quarter**

- PHI – Jalen Hurts 1-yard run (Jake Elliott kick), 6:56. Eagles 17–13. **Drive: 13 plays, 74 yards, 7:54.**
- NYG – Cam Skattebo 4-yard run (Jude McAtamney kick), 1:19. Giants 20–17. **Drive: 15 plays, 67 yards, 5:37.**

**Third quarter**

- NYG – Cam Skattebo 1-yard run (Jude McAtamney kick), 7:56. Giants 27–17. **Drive: 9 plays, 56 yards, 4:12.**

**Fourth quarter**

- NYG – Cam Skattebo 1-yard run (Jude McAtamney kick), 9:41. Giants 34–17. **Drive: 3 plays, 23 yards, 1:44.**

**Top passers**

- PHI – Jalen Hurts – 24/33, 283 yards, TD, INT
- NYG – Jaxson Dart – 17/25, 195 yards, TD

**Top rushers**

- PHI – Saquon Barkley – 12 rushes, 58 yards
- NYG – Cam Skattebo – 19 rushes, 98 yards, 3 TD

**Top receivers**

- PHI – Dallas Goedert – 9 receptions, 110 yards, TD
- NYG – Wan'Dale Robinson – 6 receptions, 84 yards, TD

After the Eagles scored first with a field goal, the Giants would then be in control for most of the game. Jaxson Dart ran for a 20-yard touchdown to score the team's first points on their opening drive, becoming just the second quarterback in NFL history along with Patrick Mahomes to lead his team to an opening drive touchdown in each of his first three career starts. On the Giants' next drive, Dart found Wan'Dale Robinson for a 35-yard touchdown reception, giving the Giants a 13–3 lead after Jude McAtamney missed the extra point. This was the first time since Week 9 of the 2020 season that the Giants scored ten or more points in the first quarter of a game. Cam Skattebo was physical and ran for three touchdowns in the win, breaking the spirits of the Eagles defense.

Early in the fourth quarter, Cor'Dale Flott intercepted Jalen Hurts inside the red zone, and returned the ball 68 yards, setting up Skattebo's third touchdown of the night. On the Eagles' next and final drive, they almost got back to the red zone, but AJ Dillon fumbled, and Dru Phillips recovered it. The Giants then ran out the clock with Skattebo and kneeled down to seal the victory.

With the shocking win, the Giants improved to 2–4. It marked the team's first win on Thursday Night Football since 2015 when they beat the Washington Redskins, in addition to their first divisional win since Week 18 of 2023 (also over the Eagles).

==== Week 7: at Denver Broncos ====
Week 7: New York Giants at Denver Broncos – Game summary

| Quarter | 1 | 2 | 3 | 4 | Total |
|---|---|---|---|---|---|
| Giants | 7 | 6 | 6 | 13 | **32** |
| **Broncos** | 0 | 0 | 0 | 33 | **33** |

at Empower Field at Mile High, Denver, Colorado

- Date: October 19
- Game time: 4:05 p.m. EDT/2:05 p.m. MDT
- Game weather: Partly cloudy, 72 °F (22 °C)
- Game attendance: 75,788
- Referee: Brad Allen
- TV announcers (CBS): Kevin Harlan, Trent Green and Melanie Collins
- Recap, Game Book

Game information

**First quarter**

- NYG – Daniel Bellinger 44-yard pass from Jaxson Dart (Jude McAtamney kick), 6:54. Giants 7–0. **Drive: 4 plays, 77 yards, 1:31.**

**Second quarter**

- NYG – Cam Skattebo 13-yard pass from Jaxson Dart (kick failed), 8:46. Giants 13–0. **Drive: 10 plays, 82 yards, 5:59.**

**Third quarter**

- NYG – Tyrone Tracy Jr. 31-yard run (pass failed), 2:41. Giants 19–0. **Drive: 7 plays, 59 yards, 3:23.**

**Fourth quarter**

- DEN – Troy Franklin 2-yard pass from Bo Nix (Bo Nix–Courtland Sutton pass), 14:08. Giants 19–8. **Drive: 8 plays, 78 yards, 3:33.**
- NYG – Theo Johnson 41-yard pass from Jaxson Dart (Jude McAtamney kick), 10:14. Giants 26–8. **Drive: 6 plays, 67 yards, 3:54.**
- DEN – Bo Nix 7-yard run (Bo Nix–Troy Franklin pass), 5:13. Giants 26–16. **Drive: 13 plays, 74 yards, 5:01.**
- DEN – RJ Harvey 2-yard pass from Bo Nix (Wil Lutz kick), 3:51. Giants 26–23. **Drive: 4 plays, 19 yards, 0:56.**
- DEN – Bo Nix 18-yard run (Wil Lutz kick), 1:51. Broncos 30–26. **Drive: 6 plays, 68 yards, 0:51.**
- NYG – Jaxson Dart 1-yard run (kick failed), 0:37. Giants 32–30. **Drive: 7 plays, 65 yards, 1:14.**
- DEN – Wil Lutz 39-yard field goal, 0:00. Broncos 33–32. **Drive: 4 plays, 56 yards, 0:37.**

**Top passers**

- NYG – Jaxson Dart – 15/33, 283 yards, 3 TD, INT
- DEN – Bo Nix – 27/50, 279 yards, 2 TD

**Top rushers**

- NYG – Cam Skattebo – 16 rushes, 60 yards
- DEN – J. K. Dobbins – 14 rushes, 81 yards

**Top receivers**

- NYG – Wan'Dale Robinson – 6 receptions, 95 yards
- DEN – Courtland Sutton – 6 receptions, 87 yards

The Giants held a 19–0 lead heading into the fourth quarter and later extended it to 26–8 with just over 10 minutes remaining, but the Broncos responded with a touchdown, and on the next drive, an interception by Jaxson Dart to linebacker Justin Strnad set up another Broncos score, trimming the lead to 26–23. After a Giants three-and-out, the Broncos struck again, scoring their third consecutive touchdown to take their first lead of the day, 30–26, with under two minutes left. But then the Giants answered, aided by a crucial pass interference penalty on Broncos cornerback Riley Moss that placed the ball at the 1-yard line. Dart then ran it in for the go-ahead touchdown with 37 seconds to go. However, kicker Jude McAtamney, who had already missed an extra point earlier, missed again, leaving the Giants up 32–30. With time winding down, the Broncos marched down the field. Key completions to Marvin Mims and Courtland Sutton set up a 39-yard field goal attempt, which Wil Lutz nailed as time expired to give the Broncos a dramatic 33–32 comeback victory.

The Giants became the first team in NFL history to lose a game when leading by 18 points in the final six minutes, ending a streak of 1,602 consecutive wins by teams in that situation. The Broncos’ 33 fourth-quarter points were the most in NFL history by any team shut out through the first three quarters, and the second-highest scoring fourth quarter by a team in league history, behind only the Detroit Lions' 34-point quarter in a 2007 game against the Chicago Bears. This was the Giants' biggest blown lead since blowing a 21–0 lead to the Jacksonville Jaguars in 2014.

With the devastating loss, the Giants fell to 2-5 on the season.

Following the game, the Giants released kicker Jude McAtamney.

==== Week 8: at Philadelphia Eagles ====
Week 8: New York Giants at Philadelphia Eagles – Game summary

| Quarter | 1 | 2 | 3 | 4 | Total |
|---|---|---|---|---|---|
| Giants | 7 | 3 | 3 | 7 | **20** |
| **Eagles** | 7 | 14 | 3 | 14 | **38** |

at Lincoln Financial Field, Philadelphia, Pennsylvania

- Date: October 26
- Game time: 1:00 p.m. EDT
- Game weather: Sunny, 60 °F (16 °C)
- Game attendance: 69,879
- Referee: Brad Rogers
- TV announcers (Fox): Kevin Burkhardt, Tom Brady, Erin Andrews and Tom Rinaldi
- Recap, Game Book

Game information

**First quarter**

- PHI – Saquon Barkley 65-yard run (Jake Elliott kick), 14:43. Eagles 7–0. **Drive: 2 plays, 65 yards, 0:17.**
- NYG – Cam Skattebo 18-yard pass from Jaxson Dart (Graham Gano kick), 2:56. Tied 7–7. **Drive: 6 plays, 52 yards, 3:14.**

**Second quarter**

- PHI – Saquon Barkley 9-yard pass from Jalen Hurts (Jake Elliott kick), 11:38. Eagles 14–7. **Drive: 11 plays, 53 yards, 6:18.**
- NYG – Graham Gano 47-yard field goal, 2:53. Eagles 14–10. **Drive: 7 plays, 37 yards, 3:20.**
- PHI – Dallas Goedert 6-yard pass from Jalen Hurts (Jake Elliott kick), 0:21. Eagles 21–10. **Drive: 7 plays, 58 yards, 2:32.**

**Third quarter**

- PHI – Jake Elliott 40-yard field goal, 7:03. Eagles 24–10. **Drive: 11 plays, 54 yards, 6:07.**
- NYG – Graham Gano 34-yard field goal, 0:19. Eagles 24–13. **Drive: 15 plays, 59 yards, 6:44.**

**Fourth quarter**

- PHI – Dallas Goedert 17-yard pass from Jalen Hurts (Jake Elliott kick), 11:17. Eagles 31–13. **Drive: 7 plays, 72 yards, 4:02.**
- PHI – Jahan Dotson 40-yard pass from Jalen Hurts (Jake Elliott kick), 5:59. Eagles 38–13. **Drive: 6 plays, 73 yards, 3:30.**
- NYG – Jaxson Dart 2-yard run (Graham Gano kick), 2:44. Eagles 38–20. **Drive: 7 plays, 65 yards, 3:15.**

**Top passers**

- NYG – Jaxson Dart – 14/24, 193 yards, TD
- PHI – Jalen Hurts – 15/20, 179 yards, 4 TD

**Top rushers**

- NYG – Tyrone Tracy Jr. – 10 rushes, 39 yards
- PHI – Saquon Barkley – 14 rushes, 150 yards, TD

**Top receivers**

- NYG – Wan'Dale Robinson – 3 receptions, 48 yards
- PHI – Devonta Smith – 6 receptions, 84 yards

Several controversial officiating decisions went against the Giants. The first occurred when the Eagles ran a "tush push" play in the red zone on 4th-and-1. Jalen Hurts lost control of the ball before being downed, but the play was ruled dead due to forward progress being stopped. Replays indicated that it should have been ruled a fumble recovered by Kayvon Thibodeaux, but forward progress is not reviewable, allowing the Eagles to retain possession and score shortly afterward. Later in the game, a 68-yard touchdown reception by Darius Slayton was negated by an offensive pass interference penalty, a call that drew disagreement from the game's announcers after a replay was shown.

With their 13th consecutive defeat in Philadelphia dating back to 2013, the Giants fell to 2–6 on the year. It marked the eighth time in nine seasons that the team had started 2–6 or worse through eight games, and the Giants failed to achieve their first season sweep of the Eagles since 2007.

Following the game, it was revealed that running back Cam Skattebo would miss the remainder of the season after suffering a dislocated right ankle in the second quarter.

==== Week 9: vs. San Francisco 49ers ====
Week 9: San Francisco 49ers at New York Giants – Game summary

| Quarter | 1 | 2 | 3 | 4 | Total |
|---|---|---|---|---|---|
| **49ers** | 7 | 10 | 3 | 14 | **34** |
| Giants | 7 | 0 | 3 | 14 | **24** |

at MetLife Stadium, East Rutherford, New Jersey

- Date: November 2
- Game time: 1:00 p.m. EST
- Game weather: Fair, 56 °F (13 °C)
- Game attendance: 83,258
- Referee: John Hussey
- TV announcers (CBS): Kevin Harlan, Trent Green and Melanie Collins
- Recap, Game Book

Game information

**First quarter**

- NYG – Theo Johnson 15-yard pass from Jaxson Dart (Graham Gano kick), 10:50. Giants 7–0. **Drive: 10 plays, 64 yards, 4:10.**
- SF – Christian McCaffrey 5-yard pass from Mac Jones (Eddy Pineiro kick), 4:16. Tied 7–7. **Drive: 12 plays, 68 yards, 6:34.**

**Second quarter**

- SF – Jauan Jennings 11-yard pass from Mac Jones (Eddy Pineiro kick), 13:08. 49ers 14–7. **Drive: 8 plays, 80 yards, 4:03.**
- SF – Eddy Pineiro 54-yard field goal, 1:55. 49ers 17–7. **Drive: 4 plays, 5 yards, 1:37.**

**Third quarter**

- SF – Eddy Pineiro 33-yard field goal, 9:55. 49ers 20–7. **Drive: 13 plays, 46 yards, 5:05.**
- NYG – Graham Gano 22-yard field goal, 6:42. 49ers 20–10. **Drive: 8 plays, 64 yards, 3:13.**

**Fourth quarter**

- SF – Brian Robinson Jr. 18-yard run (Eddy Pineiro kick), 11:35. 49ers 27–10. **Drive: 9 plays, 76 yards, 4:58.**
- NYG – Jaxson Dart 6-yard run (Graham Gano kick), 7:52. 49ers 27–17. **Drive: 7 plays, 65 yards, 3:43.**
- SF – Christian McCaffrey 3-yard run (Eddy Pineiro kick), 4:13. 49ers 34–17. **Drive: 6 plays, 60 yards, 3:39.**
- NYG – Gunner Olszewski 24-yard pass from Jaxson Dart (Graham Gano kick), 1:21. 49ers 34–24. **Drive: 9 plays, 69 yards, 2:52.**

**Top passers**

- SF – Mac Jones – 19/24, 235 yards, 2 TD
- NYG – Jaxson Dart – 24/33, 191 yards, 2 TD

**Top rushers**

- SF – Christian McCaffrey – 28 rushes, 106 yards, TD
- NYG – Jaxson Dart – 8 rushes, 56 yards, TD

**Top receivers**

- SF – Christian McCaffrey – 5 receptions, 67 yards, TD
- NYG – Darius Slayton – 5 receptions, 62 yards

Jaxson Dart, who was named the NFL Offensive Rookie of the Month in October, put together another strong effort, becoming the first quarterback in NFL history to record at least one passing and one rushing touchdown in four consecutive games. However, the Giants defense was listless again, surrendering more than 30 points for the third consecutive game.

With their 3rd loss in a row, the Giants fell to 2–7.

==== Week 10: at Chicago Bears ====
Week 10: New York Giants at Chicago Bears – Game summary

| Quarter | 1 | 2 | 3 | 4 | Total |
|---|---|---|---|---|---|
| Giants | 0 | 10 | 7 | 3 | **20** |
| **Bears** | 7 | 0 | 3 | 14 | **24** |

at Soldier Field, Chicago, Illinois

- Date: November 9
- Game time: 1:00 p.m. EST/12:00 p.m. CST
- Game weather: Light snow, 33 °F (1 °C)
- Game attendance: 58,884
- Referee: Adrian Hill
- TV announcers (Fox): Joe Davis, Greg Olsen and Pam Oliver
- Recap, Game Book

Game information

**First quarter**

- CHI – Kyle Monangai 8-yard run (Cairo Santos kick), 5:40. Bears 7–0. **Drive: 8 plays, 47 yards, 3:42.**

**Second quarter**

- NYG – Jaxson Dart 3-yard run (Younghoe Koo kick), 13:06. Tied 7–7. **Drive: 6 plays, 80 yards, 2:34.**
- NYG – Younghoe Koo 32-yard field goal, 0:03. Giants 10–7. **Drive: 8 plays, 53 yards, 1:05.**

**Third quarter**

- NYG – Jaxson Dart 24-yard run (Younghoe Koo kick), 12:17. Giants 17–7. **Drive: 6 plays, 56 yards, 2:43.**
- CHI – Cairo Santos 22-yard field goal, 0:34. Giants 17–10. **Drive: 8 plays, 80 yards, 4:31.**

**Fourth quarter**

- NYG – Younghoe Koo 19-yard field goal, 10:19. Giants 20–10. **Drive: 10 plays, 79 yards, 5:15.**
- CHI – Rome Odunze 2-yard pass from Caleb Williams (Cairo Santos kick), 3:56. Giants 20–17. **Drive: 9 plays, 91 yards, 2:17.**
- CHI – Caleb Williams 17-yard run (Cairo Santos kick), 1:47. Bears 24–20. **Drive: 4 plays, 53 yards, 1:06.**

**Top passers**

- NYG – Jaxson Dart – 19/29, 242 yards
- CHI – Caleb Williams – 20/36, 220 yards, TD

**Top rushers**

- NYG – Tyrone Tracy Jr. – 14 rushes, 71 yards
- CHI – D'Andre Swift – 13 rushes, 80 yards

**Top receivers**

- NYG – Darius Slayton – 4 receptions, 89 yards
- CHI – Rome Odunze – 6 receptions, 86 yards, TD

Although the Giants held a 20–10 lead with 10:19 remaining, they suffered yet another fourth-quarter collapse, allowing Bears quarterback Caleb Williams to account for two touchdowns and secure the victory. To make matters worse, Jaxson Dart was removed from the game and evaluated for a concussion at the end of the third quarter. Dart ran for two touchdowns, becoming the first quarterback in NFL history to score a rushing touchdown in five consecutive games. With the loss, the Giants extended their losing streak to four games and fell to 2–8, while also suffering their fourth blown lead of ten points or more on the road this season.

The next day, the Giants announced that head coach Brian Daboll had been fired, and assistant head coach/offensive coordinator Mike Kafka would serve as interim head coach. Daboll finished his tenure with the Giants with a 20–40–1 record over four seasons, and a playoff record of 1–1.

==== Week 11: vs. Green Bay Packers ====
Week 11: Green Bay Packers at New York Giants – Game summary

| Quarter | 1 | 2 | 3 | 4 | Total |
|---|---|---|---|---|---|
| **Packers** | 0 | 13 | 6 | 8 | **27** |
| Giants | 7 | 6 | 0 | 7 | **20** |

at MetLife Stadium, East Rutherford, New Jersey

- Date: November 16
- Game time: 1:00 p.m. EST
- Game weather: Mostly cloudy, 55 °F (13 °C)
- Game attendance: 82,438
- Referee: Scott Novak
- TV announcers (Fox): Adam Amin, Drew Brees and Kristina Pink
- Recap, Game Book

Game information

**First quarter**

- NYG – Devin Singletary 5-yard run (Younghoe Koo Kick), 10:35. Giants 7–0. **Drive: 9 plays, 65 yards, 4:25**

**Second quarter**

- GB – Christian Watson 1-yard pass from Malik Willis (kick failed), 13:54. Giants 7–6. **Drive: 12 plays, 62 yards, 7:21**
- GB – Emanuel Wilson 11-yard run (Lucas Havrisik kick), 7:39. Packers 13–7. **Drive: 10 plays, 84 yards, 4:48**
- NYG – Devin Singletary 2-yard run (kick failed), 1:11. Tied 13–13. **Drive: 11 plays, 68 yards, 6:28**

**Third quarter**

- GB – Josh Whyle 2-yard pass from Jordan Love (kick failed), 11:40. Packers 19–13. **Drive: 6 plays, 66 yards, 3:20**

**Fourth quarter**

- NYG – Jameis Winston 1-yard run (Younghoe Koo kick), 7:22. Giants 20–19. **Drive: 15 plays, 85 yards, 7:59**
- GB – Christian Watson 17-yard pass from Jordan Love (Jordan Love–Emanuel Wilson pass), 4:02. Packers 27–20. **Drive: 7 plays, 65 yards, 3:20**

**Top passers**

- GB – Jordan Love – 13/24, 174 yards, 2 TD
- NYG – Jameis Winston – 19/29, 201 yards, INT

**Top rushers**

- GB – Emanuel Wilson – 11 rushes, 40 yards, TD
- NYG – Tyrone Tracy Jr. – 19 rushes, 88 yards

**Top receivers**

- GB – Romeo Doubs – 4 receptions, 53 yards
- NYG – Isaiah Hodgins – 5 receptions, 57 yards

Jameis Winston made his first start as a Giant after Jaxson Dart was ruled out due to being in concussion protocol. Devin Singletary scored his first touchdown of the season to cap off the Giants' opening drive, which was the first opening drive touchdown the Packers had allowed all season. The two teams played a close game throughout the afternoon, with the windy conditions causing several extra points to be missed.

Down 27–20, the Giants were in the red zone with just under 40 seconds remaining, but Winston threw an interception in the end zone to Evan Williams while targeting Jalin Hyatt. The Giants had a final chance to potentially tie or win the game on a Hail Mary after using all their timeouts and forcing the Packers to punt, but Winston was strip-sacked by Micah Parsons as time expired, and the fumble was recovered by Rashan Gary.

With their first loss to the Packers since 2019, the Giants became the first team to secure a losing record, falling to 2–9 with their fifth consecutive loss.

==== Week 12: at Detroit Lions ====
Week 12: New York Giants at Detroit Lions – Game summary

| Quarter | 1 | 2 | 3 | 4 | OT | Total |
|---|---|---|---|---|---|---|
| Giants | 10 | 10 | 0 | 7 | 0 | **27** |
| **Lions** | 0 | 17 | 0 | 10 | 7 | **34** |

at Ford Field, Detroit, Michigan

- Date: November 23
- Game time: 1:00 p.m. EST
- Game weather: None (indoor stadium)
- Game attendance: 64,238
- Referee: Craig Wrolstad
- TV announcers (Fox): Kenny Albert, Jonathan Vilma and Megan Olivi
- Recap, Game Book

Game information

**First quarter**

- NYG – Wan'Dale Robinson 39-yard pass from Jameis Winston (Younghoe Koo kick), 12:56. Giants 7–0. **Drive: 4 plays, 70 yards, 2:04.**
- NYG – Younghoe Koo 21-yard field goal, 0:00. Giants 10–0. **Drive: 10 plays, 87 yards, 5:03.**

**Second quarter**

- DET – Amon-Ra St. Brown 11-yard pass from Jared Goff (Jake Bates kick), 11:41. Giants 10–7. **Drive: 7 plays, 65 yards, 3:19.**
- NYG – Isaiah Hodgins 12-yard pass from Jameis Winston (Younghoe Koo kick), 8:21. Giants 17–7. **Drive: 6 plays, 69 yards, 3:20.**
- DET – Jahmyr Gibbs 3-yard pass from Jared Goff (Jake Bates kick), 2:16. Giants 17–14. **Drive: 3 plays, 61 yards, 1:45.**
- NYG – Younghoe Koo 44-yard field goal, 0:38. Giants 20–14. **Drive: 6 plays, 56 yards, 1:38.**
- DET – Jake Bates 37-yard field goal, 0:00. Giants 20–17. **Drive: 5 plays, 38 yards, 0:38.**

**Third quarter**

- No scoring plays.

**Fourth quarter**

- NYG – Jameis Winston 33-yard pass from Gunner Olszewski (Younghoe Koo kick), 12:16. Giants 27–17. **Drive: 9 plays, 85 yards, 5:03.**
- DET – Jahmyr Gibbs 49-yard run (Jake Bates kick), 10:50. Giants 27–24. **Drive: 3 plays, 81 yards, 1:26.**
- DET – Jake Bates 59-yard field goal, 0:28. Tied 27–27. **Drive: 13 plays, 53 yards, 2:26.**

**Overtime**

- DET – Jahmyr Gibbs 69-yard run (Jake Bates kick), 9:42. Lions 34–27. **Drive: 1 play, 69 yards, 0:18.**

**Top passers**

- NYG – Jameis Winston – 18/36, 366 yards, 2 TD, INT
- DET – Jared Goff – 28/42, 279 yards, 2 TD, INT

**Top rushers**

- NYG – Tyrone Tracy Jr. – 20 rushes, 62 yards
- DET – Jahmyr Gibbs – 15 rushes, 219 yards, 2 TD

**Top receivers**

- NYG – Wan'Dale Robinson – 9 receptions, 156 yards, TD
- DET – Amon-Ra St. Brown – 9 receptions, 149 yards, TD

Although the Giants pulled off two major trick plays which led to touchdowns, they squandered their fifth lead of ten points or more on the road this season. On their opening drive, Jameis Winston threw a 39-yard touchdown pass to Wan'Dale Robinson on a flea-flicker. This was the Giants' sixth opening drive touchdown this season, matching their total from the previous four seasons combined. Later, return specialist/wide receiver Gunner Olszewski threw a 33-yard touchdown pass to Winston on another trick play.

Late in the fourth quarter, the Giants held a 27–24 lead and were in the red zone. Instead of kicking a field goal, Mike Kafka opted to go for it on fourth down from the 6-yard line in goal-to-go range, and Winston threw a pass to Theo Johnson that fell incomplete. The Lions then marched down the field, with kicker Jake Bates nailing a 59-yard field goal to tie the game with less than 30 seconds left.

In overtime, the Lions scored on the first play from scrimmage with Jahmyr Gibbs running the ball 69 yards to the end zone untouched. The Giants then got the ball needing a touchdown to keep the game alive, but Winston was sacked on fourth down, sealing the team's sixth consecutive loss.

With the loss, and with the Seahawks' win over the Titans, the Giants dropped to 2–10 and became the first team eliminated from playoff contention for the second year in a row. They are the first team to do this since the Houston Texans in 2021 and 2022. Additionally, it marked the third consecutive year the Giants failed to qualify for the postseason.

Following another poor defensive performance, the Giants dismissed defensive coordinator Shane Bowen the next day and named outside linebackers coach Charlie Bullen the interim defensive coordinator.

==== Week 13: at New England Patriots ====
Week 13: New York Giants at New England Patriots – Game summary

| Quarter | 1 | 2 | 3 | 4 | Total |
|---|---|---|---|---|---|
| Giants | 0 | 7 | 0 | 8 | **15** |
| **Patriots** | 17 | 13 | 0 | 3 | **33** |

at Gillette Stadium, Foxborough, Massachusetts

- Date: December 1
- Game time: 8:15 p.m. EST
- Game weather: Mostly clear, 30 °F (−1 °C)
- Game attendance: 64,628
- Referee: Shawn Smith
- TV announcers (WWOR/ESPN): Joe Buck, Troy Aikman, Lisa Salters and Laura Rutledge
- Recap, Game Book

Game information

**First quarter**

- NE – Andres Borregales 22-yard field goal, 9:14. Patriots 3–0. **Drive: 12 plays, 49 yards, 5:46.**
- NE – Marcus Jones 94-yard punt return (Andres Borregales kick), 5:17. Patriots 10–0.
- NE – Kayshon Boutte 3-yard pass from Drake Maye (Andres Borregales kick), 1:00. Patriots 17–0. **Drive: 5 plays, 61 yards, 2:38.**

**Second quarter**

- NYG – Darius Slayton 30-yard pass from Jaxson Dart (Younghoe Koo kick), 12:46. Patriots 17–7. **Drive: 6 plays, 62 yards, 3:14.**
- NE – Kyle Williams 33-yard pass from Drake Maye (Andres Borregales kick), 3:29. Patriots 24–7. **Drive: 5 plays, 58 yards, 2:53.**
- NE – Andres Borregales 30-yard field goal, 1:48. Patriots 27–7. **Drive: 5 plays, 15 yards, 1:35.**
- NE – Andres Borregales 28-yard field goal, 0:00. Patriots 30–7. **Drive: 5 plays, 67 yards, 1:07.**

**Third quarter**

- No scoring plays

**Fourth quarter**

- NYG – Devin Singletary 22-yard run (Jaxson Dart–Darius Slayton pass), 14:54. Patriots 30–15. **Drive: 9 plays, 65 yards, 4:15.**
- NE – Andres Borregales 23-yard field goal, 2:14. Patriots 33–15. **Drive: 12 plays, 58 yards, 5:27.**

**Top passers**

- NYG – Jaxson Dart – 17/24, 139 yards, TD
- NE – Drake Maye – 24/31, 282 yards, 2 TD

**Top rushers**

- NYG – Devin Singletary – 12 rushes, 68 yards, TD
- NE – TreVeyon Henderson – 11 rushes, 67 yards

**Top receivers**

- NYG – Darius Slayton – 2 receptions, 41 yards, TD
- NE – Hunter Henry – 4 receptions, 73 yards

Although Jaxson Dart returned, the Giants were completely outmatched on a cold night against the red-hot Patriots.

After New England took a 10–0 lead thanks to a 94-yard punt return touchdown by Marcus Jones, Dart took a big hit from Christian Elliss while running near the sideline. No flag was thrown for the hit since Dart was in bounds, but tight end Theo Johnson was called for unnecessary roughness for shoving Elliss on the sideline after the hit, causing a scrum. The Giants then had to punt the ball after the penalty pushed them back, leading to another Patriots touchdown.

Down 17–0, Dart connected with Darius Slayton for a 30-yard touchdown, Slayton's first of the season. On their next drive, the Giants had an opportunity to make it a one-score game with a field goal, but kicker Younghoe Koo inexplicably missed the ball with his foot, kicking the ground. Holder Jamie Gillan picked the ball up and was drilled right away, causing a turnover on downs. Then, towards the end of the first half, Gunner Olszewski took a huge hit on a kickoff return that made him fumble the ball, again from Elliss, leading to another Patriots field goal. The three special teams' errors proved very costly for the Giants, as they entered halftime trailing 30–7 and ended up losing 33–15.

Rookie linebacker Abdul Carter recorded his first full sack in the NFL during the second quarter, although he was benched on the team's opening drive for violating team rules.

With their 13th consecutive road loss (7th straight loss overall), the Giants fell to 2–11. This was also the 3rd time the Giants lost to the Patriots in their last 4 games since 2015.

==== Week 15: vs. Washington Commanders ====
Week 15: Washington Commanders at New York Giants – Game summary

| Quarter | 1 | 2 | 3 | 4 | Total |
|---|---|---|---|---|---|
| **Commanders** | 3 | 19 | 0 | 7 | **29** |
| Giants | 0 | 7 | 7 | 7 | **21** |

at MetLife Stadium, East Rutherford, New Jersey

- Date: December 14
- Game time: 1:00 p.m. EST
- Game weather: Overcast, 27 °F (−3 °C)
- Game attendance: 77,481
- Referee: Bill Vinovich
- TV announcers (Fox): Kenny Albert, Jonathan Vilma and Megan Olivi
- Recap, Game Book

Game information

**First quarter**

- WAS – Jake Moody 46-yard field goal, 9:22. Commanders 3–0. **Drive: 10 plays, 39 yards, 5:38.**

**Second quarter**

- WAS – Jacory Croskey-Merritt 16-yard run (Jake Moody kick), 13:38. Commanders 10–0. **Drive: 4 plays, 47 yards, 1:54.**
- WAS – Jake Moody 39-yard field goal, 8:26. Commanders 13–0. **Drive: 9 plays, 56 yards, 3:43.**
- NYG – Tyrone Tracy Jr. 12-yard run (Younghoe Koo kick), 3:37. Commanders 13–7. **Drive: 10 plays, 65 yards, 4:49.**
- WAS – Jaylin Lane 63-yard punt return (kick failed), 1:05. Commanders 19–7.
- WAS – Jake Moody 42-yard field goal, 0:00. Commanders 22–7. **Drive: 2 plays, 0 yards, 0:10.**

**Third quarter**

- NYG – Tyrone Tracy Jr. 18-yard pass from Jaxson Dart (Younghoe Koo kick), 11:48. Commanders 22–14. **Drive: 7 plays, 82 yards, 3:12.**

**Fourth quarter**

- WAS – Terry McLaurin 51-yard pass from Marcus Mariota (Jake Moody kick), 13:46. Commanders 29–14. **Drive: 2 plays, 59 yards, 1:09.**
- NYG – Wan'Dale Robinson 16-yard pass from Jaxson Dart (Younghoe Koo kick), 3:43. Commanders 29–21. **Drive: 4 plays, 21 yards, 1:56.**

**Top passers**

- WAS – Marcus Mariota – 10/19, 211 yards, TD
- NYG – Jaxson Dart – 20/36, 246 yards, 2 TD, INT

**Top rushers**

- WAS – Jacory Croskey-Merritt – 18 rushes, 96 yards, TD
- NYG – Tyrone Tracy Jr. – 15 rushes, 70 yards, TD

**Top receivers**

- WAS – Terry McLaurin – 3 receptions, 69 yards, TD
- NYG – Theo Johnson – 3 receptions, 72 yards

The Giants played a blunder-ridden game against the Marcus Mariota-led Commanders. Late in the second quarter, Jaxson Dart threw a costly interception which led to another Washington field goal to give the Commanders a 22–7 lead entering halftime. Darius Slayton had two critical drops, the latter coming in the end zone late in the third quarter, costing the Giants a touchdown. Then in the fourth quarter, the Giants had a first-and-goal opportunity at the Washington 1-yard line but ended up turning the ball over on downs. On special teams, kicker Younghoe Koo, who would be released two days later, missed two field goals and the Giants allowed a 63-yard punt return for a touchdown, the second they've surrendered in as many games.

Third-overall pick Abdul Carter had his best game in the NFL, recording a sack, two fumbles with one recovery, and three tackles for loss. Tyrone Tracy Jr. had his most impactful game of the season, scoring two touchdowns, one rushing and one receiving.

With the upset loss, the Giants dropped to 2–12 and extended their losing streak to eight games, while getting swept by the Commanders for the second straight season. This resulted in the Giants finishing dead last in the NFC East for the second straight year.

==== Week 16: vs. Minnesota Vikings ====
Week 16: Minnesota Vikings at New York Giants – Game summary

| Quarter | 1 | 2 | 3 | 4 | Total |
|---|---|---|---|---|---|
| **Vikings** | 3 | 10 | 0 | 3 | **16** |
| Giants | 0 | 10 | 0 | 3 | **13** |

at MetLife Stadium, East Rutherford, New Jersey

- Date: December 21
- Game time: 1:00 p.m. EST
- Game weather: Fair, 46 °F (8 °C)
- Game attendance: 76,515
- Referee: Alex Moore
- TV announcers (Fox): Kenny Albert, Jonathan Vilma and Megan Olivi
- Recap, Game Book

Game information

**First quarter**

- MIN – Will Reichard 43-yard field goal, 10:49. Vikings 3–0. **Drive: 9 plays, 35 yards, 4:11.**

**Second quarter**

- NYG – Ben Sauls 27-yard field goal, 11:04. Tied 3–3. **Drive: 12 plays, 35 yards, 5:37.**
- MIN – Will Reichard 31-yard field goal, 4:50. Vikings 6–3. **Drive: 11 plays, 64 yards, 6:14.**
- MIN – J. J. McCarthy 12-yard run (Will Reichard kick), 2:01. Vikings 13–3. **Drive: 3 plays, 16 yards, 1:38.**
- NYG – Tyler Nubin 27-yard fumble recovery (Ben Sauls kick), 0:17. Vikings 13–10.

**Fourth quarter**

- NYG – Ben Sauls 39-yard field goal, 11:06. Tied 13–13. **Drive: 14 plays, 54 yards, 9:21.**
- MIN – Will Reichard 30-yard field goal, 4:15. Vikings 16–13. **Drive: 14 plays, 57 yards, 6:51.**

**Top passers**

- MIN – J. J. McCarthy – 9/14, 108 yards, INT
- NYG – Jaxson Dart – 7/13, 33 yards, INT

**Top rushers**

- MIN – Aaron Jones – 21 rushes, 85 yards
- NYG – Tyrone Tracy Jr. – 16 rushes, 71 yards

**Top receivers**

- MIN – Justin Jefferson – 6 receptions, 85 yards
- NYG – Wan'Dale Robinson – 3 receptions, 19 yards

The Giants' offense was stymied the entire day, only mustering 13 net passing yards and failing to find the end zone. Their lone touchdown of the game came on defense at the end of the first half, when Brian Burns strip-sacked J. J. McCarthy, with Tyler Nubin recovering the fumble and returning it 27 yards. This was the first defensive touchdown the Giants had scored since Week 16 against the Eagles two seasons ago. The Giants almost got another defensive touchdown earlier, but Jevon Holland had his 96-yard pick-six negated by an Abdul Carter offsides penalty.

With their 6th straight loss to Minnesota in the regular season, the Giants were swept by the NFC North and they fell to 2–13.

==== Week 17: at Las Vegas Raiders ====
Week 17: New York Giants at Las Vegas Raiders – Game summary

| Quarter | 1 | 2 | 3 | 4 | Total |
|---|---|---|---|---|---|
| **Giants** | 7 | 10 | 10 | 7 | **34** |
| Raiders | 0 | 3 | 7 | 0 | **10** |

at Allegiant Stadium, Paradise, Nevada

- Date: December 28
- Game time: 4:05 p.m. EST/1:05 p.m. PST
- Game weather: None (indoor stadium)
- Game attendance: 62,021
- Referee: Land Clark
- TV announcers (CBS): Kevin Harlan, Trent Green and Melanie Collins
- Recap, Game Book

Game information

**First quarter**

- NYG – Devin Singletary 1-yard run (Ben Sauls kick), 0:00. Giants 7–0. **Drive: 5 plays, 44 yards, 2:36.**

**Second quarter**

- LV – Daniel Carlson 42-yard field goal, 9:41. Giants 7–3. **Drive: 9 plays, 35 yards, 5:19.**
- NYG – Jaxson Dart 12-yard run (Ben Sauls kick), 5:56. Giants 14–3. **Drive: 8 plays, 65 yards, 3:45.**
- NYG – Ben Sauls 32-yard field goal, 0:00. Giants 17–3. **Drive: 8 plays, 65 yards, 3:45.**

**Third quarter**

- NYG – Ben Sauls 23-yard field goal, 7:17. Giants 20–3. **Drive: 11 plays, 72 yards, 4:35.**
- LV – Tyler Lockett 4-yard pass from Geno Smith (Daniel Carlson kick), 0:31. Giants 20–10. **Drive: 14 plays, 65 yards, 6:46.**
- NYG – Deonte Banks 95-yard kickoff return (Ben Sauls kick), 0:18. Giants 27–10.

**Fourth quarter**

- NYG – Jaxson Dart 2-yard run (Ben Sauls kick), 3:40. Giants 34–10. **Drive: 15 plays, 75 yards, 8:49.**

**Top passers**

- NYG – Jaxson Dart – 22/30, 207 yards
- LV – Geno Smith – 20/28, 176 yards, TD, 2 INT

**Top rushers**

- NYG – Tyrone Tracy Jr. – 14 rushes, 62 yards
- LV – Ashton Jeanty – 16 rushes, 60 yards

**Top receivers**

- NYG – Wan'Dale Robinson – 11 receptions, 113 yards
- LV – Michael Mayer – 9 receptions, 89 yards

Both teams entered the game with matching 2–13 records and nine-game losing streaks, marking the fourth time that the two teams with the league’s worst outright records have met in the final two weeks of a season. The previous occurrence came in 1981, when the 1–14 Baltimore Colts faced the 2–13 New England Patriots. Many analysts and pundits saw this game as the battle for the #1 overall pick in the NFL draft.

After both teams exchanged punts to begin the game, Bobby Okereke intercepted Geno Smith inside the red zone and returned the ball 48 yards. The Giants capitalized on the takeaway, with Devin Singletary scoring a touchdown as the first quarter ended. Dane Belton also recorded an interception in the fourth quarter, which led to Jaxson Dart's second touchdown run of the game.

Late in the third quarter, Deonte Banks returned a kickoff 95 yards untouched, marking the first special teams' touchdown for the Giants all season. Wan'Dale Robinson achieved 1,000 receiving yards in a season for the first time in his career.

With the win, the Giants snapped a nine-game losing streak and a 13-game road losing streak. The Giants improved to 3–13, finishing 2–2 against the AFC West (2–3 against the AFC) and 1–8 on the road.

==== Week 18: vs. Dallas Cowboys ====
Week 18: Dallas Cowboys at New York Giants – Game summary

| Quarter | 1 | 2 | 3 | 4 | Total |
|---|---|---|---|---|---|
| Cowboys | 10 | 0 | 0 | 7 | **17** |
| **Giants** | 6 | 10 | 8 | 10 | **34** |

at MetLife Stadium, East Rutherford, New Jersey

- Date: January 4
- Game time: 1:00 p.m. EST
- Game weather: Fair, 33 °F (1 °C)
- Game attendance: 74,395
- Referee: Adrian Hill
- TV announcers (Fox): Kevin Kugler, Daryl Johnston and Allison Williams
- Recap, Game Book

Game information

**First quarter**

- NYG – Ben Sauls 45-yard field goal, 9:15. Giants 3–0. **Drive: 4 plays, 2 yards, 0:48.**
- DAL – Brandon Aubrey 22-yard field goal, 5:21. Tied 3–3. **Drive: 9 plays, 61 yards, 3:54.**
- NYG – Ben Sauls 35-yard field goal, 1:17. Giants 6–3. **Drive: 8 plays, 44 yards, 4:04.**
- DAL – Jaydon Blue 14-yard run (Brandon Aubrey kick), 0:28. Cowboys 10–6. **Drive: 2 plays, 11 yards, 0:49.**

**Second quarter**

- NYG – Ben Sauls 23-yard field goal, 9:45. Cowboys 10–9. **Drive: 11 plays, 61 yards, 5:43.**
- NYG – Daniel Bellinger 29-yard pass from Jaxson Dart (Ben Sauls kick), 0:20. Giants 16–10. **Drive: 11 plays, 96 yards, 2:29.**

**Third quarter**

- NYG – Tyrone Tracy Jr. 13-yard pass from Jaxson Dart (Devin Singletary–Darius Slayton pass), 9:48. Giants 24–10. **Drive: 6 plays, 62 yards, 2:47.**

**Fourth quarter**

- DAL – Phil Mafah 1-yard run (Brandon Aubrey kick), 14:57. Giants 24–17. **Drive: 10 plays, 69 yards, 5:08.**
- NYG – Ben Sauls 30-yard field goal, 9:23. Giants 27–17. **Drive: 11 plays, 61 yards, 5:34.**
- NYG – Devin Singletary 6-yard run (Ben Sauls kick), 5:47. Giants 34–17. **Drive: 6 plays, 33 yards, 3:23.**

**Top passers**

- DAL – Joe Milton III – 7/13, 73 yards, INT
- NYG – Jaxson Dart – 22/32, 230 yards, 2 TD

**Top rushers**

- DAL – Jaydon Blue – 16 rushes, 64 yards, TD
- NYG – Tyrone Tracy Jr. – 18 rushes, 103 yards

**Top receivers**

- DAL – Ryan Flournoy – 5 receptions, 68 yards
- NYG – Gunner Olszewski – 8 receptions, 102 yards

Towards the end of the first half, Jaxson Dart made a backhanded flip to tight end Daniel Bellinger which resulted in a 29-yard touchdown, giving the Giants a 16–10 lead. Following halftime, the Cowboys replaced Dak Prescott with Joe Milton at quarterback, and the Giants went on to win 34–17.

With their first win against the Cowboys since 2020, the Giants finished at 4–13, 2–4 against the NFC East, and 3–5 at home, but lost out on the #1 overall pick in the draft and would select fifth. All-Pro NT Dexter Lawrence played his last game with the Giants, as he demanded a trade after the season and was shipped to the Cincinnati Bengals for the 10th overall pick.

13 days after the game, the Giants hired John Harbaugh as their 24th head coach in franchse history after being fired by the Baltimore Ravens after 18 seasons there.

=== Standings ===
==== Division ====
NFC East
| | W | L | T | PCT | DIV | CONF | PF | PA | STK |
|---|---|---|---|---|---|---|---|---|---|
| ^{(3)} Philadelphia Eagles | 11 | 6 | 0 | .647 | 3–3 | 8–4 | 379 | 325 | L1 |
| Dallas Cowboys | 7 | 9 | 1 | .441 | 4–2 | 4–7–1 | 471 | 511 | L1 |
| Washington Commanders | 5 | 12 | 0 | .294 | 3–3 | 3–9 | 356 | 451 | W1 |
| New York Giants | 4 | 13 | 0 | .235 | 2–4 | 2–10 | 381 | 439 | W2 |

==== Conference ====
NFC
| Seed | Team | Division | W | L | T | PCT | DIV | CONF | SOS | SOV | STK |
|---|---|---|---|---|---|---|---|---|---|---|---|
**Division leaders**
| 1 | Seattle Seahawks | West | 14 | 3 | 0 | .824 | 4–2 | 9–3 | .498 | .471 | W7 |
| 2 (Note: Chicago finished ahead of Philadelphia based on head-to-head victory.) | Chicago Bears | North | 11 | 6 | 0 | .647 | 2–4 | 7–5 | .458 | .406 | L2 |
| 3 | Philadelphia Eagles | East | 11 | 6 | 0 | .647 | 3–3 | 8–4 | .476 | .455 | L1 |
| 4 (Note: Carolina finished ahead of Tampa Bay and Atlanta based on head-to-head record (Carolina 3–1 to Tampa Bay 2–2 and Atlanta 1–3).) | Carolina Panthers | South | 8 | 9 | 0 | .471 | 3–3 | 6–6 | .522 | .463 | L2 |
**Wild cards**
| 5 (Note: LA Rams finished ahead of San Francisco based on common games (LA Rams 9–3 to San Francisco 8–4 against: Arizona, Atlanta, Carolina, Houston, Indianapolis, Jacksonville, New Orleans, Seattle, Tampa Bay and Tennessee).) | Los Angeles Rams | West | 12 | 5 | 0 | .706 | 4–2 | 7–5 | .526 | .485 | W1 |
| 6 | San Francisco 49ers | West | 12 | 5 | 0 | .706 | 4–2 | 9–3 | .498 | .417 | L1 |
| 7 | Green Bay Packers | North | 9 | 7 | 1 | .559 | 4–2 | 7–4–1 | .483 | .431 | L4 |
**Did not qualify for the postseason**
| 8 (Note: Minnesota finished ahead of Detroit based on head-to-head sweep.) | Minnesota Vikings | North | 9 | 8 | 0 | .529 | 4–2 | 7–5 | .514 | .431 | W5 |
| 9 | Detroit Lions | North | 9 | 8 | 0 | .529 | 2–4 | 6–6 | .490 | .428 | W1 |
| 10 (Note: Tampa Bay finished ahead of Atlanta based on common games (Tampa Bay 6–6 to Atlanta 5–7 against: Arizona, Buffalo, Carolina, LA Rams, Miami, New England, New Orleans, NY Jets, San Francisco and Seattle).) | Tampa Bay Buccaneers | South | 8 | 9 | 0 | .471 | 3–3 | 6–6 | .529 | .485 | W1 |
| 11 | Atlanta Falcons | South | 8 | 9 | 0 | .471 | 3–3 | 7–5 | .495 | .449 | W4 |
| 12 | Dallas Cowboys | East | 7 | 9 | 1 | .441 | 4–2 | 4–7–1 | .438 | .311 | L1 |
| 13 | New Orleans Saints | South | 6 | 11 | 0 | .353 | 3–3 | 4–8 | .495 | .333 | L1 |
| 14 | Washington Commanders | East | 5 | 12 | 0 | .294 | 3–3 | 3–9 | .507 | .388 | W1 |
| 15 | New York Giants | East | 4 | 13 | 0 | .235 | 2–4 | 2–10 | .524 | .478 | W2 |
| 16 | Arizona Cardinals | West | 3 | 14 | 0 | .176 | 0–6 | 3–9 | .571 | .422 | L9 |
**Tiebreakers** (Note: When breaking ties for three or more teams under the NFL's rules, they are first broken within divisions, then comparing only the highest ranked remaining team from each division.)
