= James Hudson (American football) =

American football player (born 1999)

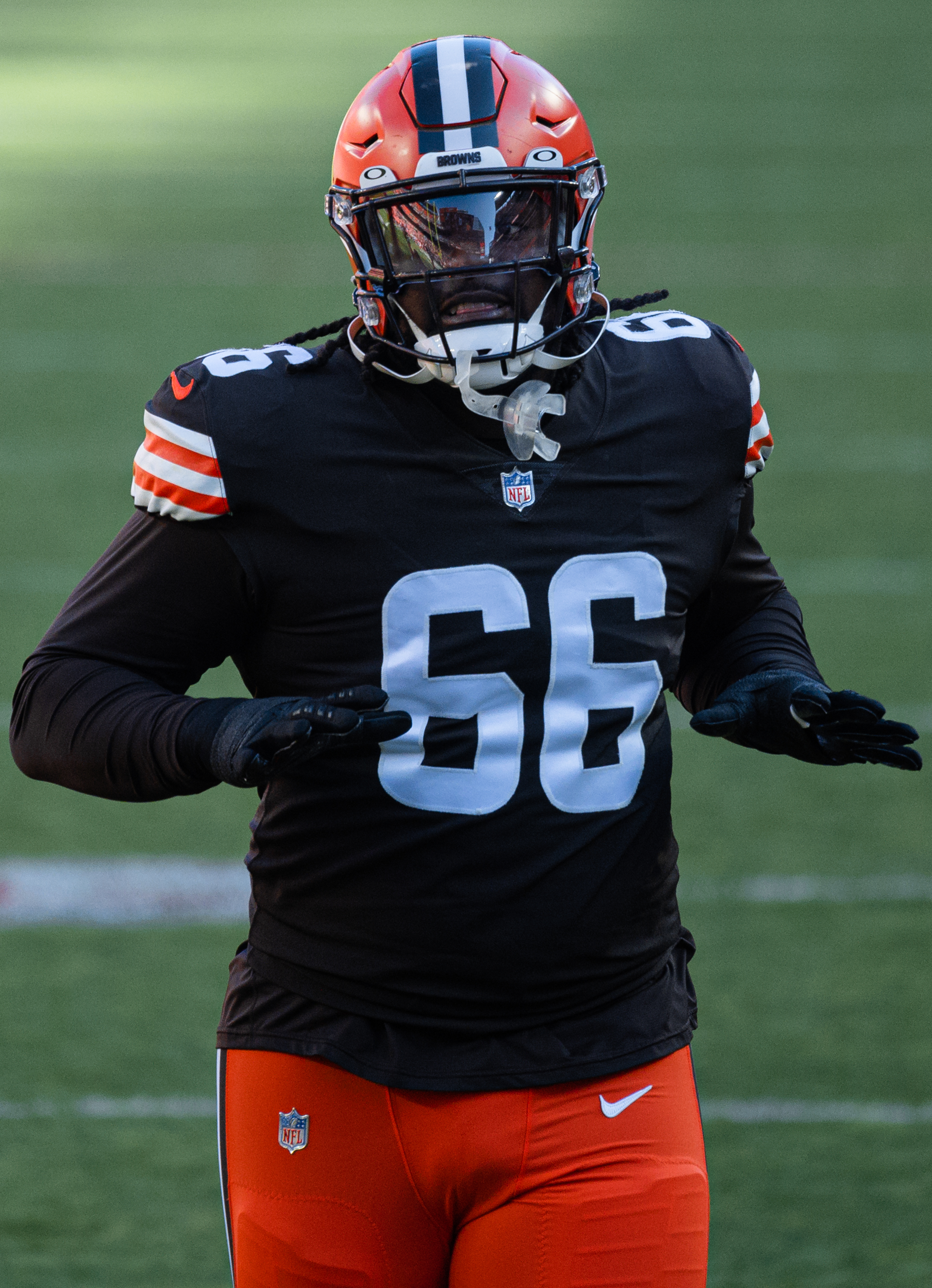
- Hudson with the Browns in 2021

No. 59 – Tennessee Titans
- Position: Offensive tackle
- Roster status: Active

Personal information
- Born: May 13, 1999 (age 27); Toledo, Ohio, U.S.
- Listed height: 6 ft 5 in (1.96 m)
- Listed weight: 313 lb (142 kg)

Career information
- High school: Central Catholic (Toledo)
- College: Michigan (2017–2018); Cincinnati (2019–2020)
- NFL draft: 2021: 4th round, 110th overall pick

Career history
- Cleveland Browns (2021–2024); New York Giants (2025); New England Patriots (2026)*; Tennessee Titans (2026–present)
- * Offseason or practice squad member only

Awards and highlights
- First-team All-AAC (2020)

Career NFL statistics as of 2025
- Games played: 60
- Games started: 19
- Stats at Pro Football Reference

James Hudson III (born May 13, 1999) is an American professional football offensive tackle of Tennessee Titans of National Football League (NFL). Hudson played college football for the Michigan Wolverines and Cincinnati Bearcats.

== College career ==
Hudson began his collegiate career at Michigan and redshirted his true freshman year as he changed positions from defensive line to offensive tackle. Hudson appeared in three games as a redshirt freshman. Hudson opted to leave the program at the end of the season and chose to transfer to Cincinnati.

Hudson sat out the regular season of his first year with the Bearcats per NCAA transfer rules after a waiver to play immediately was denied. Hudson started in the 2020 Birmingham Bowl following the end of the regular season. As a redshirt junior, Hudson started all 11 of Cincinnati's games and was named first-team All-American Athletic Conference. Following his lone season as a starter, he announced he would be forgoing his remaining eligibility and enter the 2021 NFL draft.

== Professional career ==
Pre-draft measurables
Height	Weight	Arm length	Hand span	Wingspan	40-yard dash	10-yard split	20-yard split	20-yard shuttle	Three-cone drill	Vertical jump	Broad jump	Bench press
6 ft 4 3/4 in (1.95 m)	313 lb (142 kg)	32 7/8 in (0.84 m)	10 5/8 in (0.27 m)	6 ft 8 7/8 in (2.05 m)	5.34 s	1.84 s	3.03 s	4.81 s	8.05 s	28.5 in (0.72 m)	8 ft 2 in (2.49 m)	22 reps
All values from Pro Day

=== Cleveland Browns ===
On May 1, 2021, Hudson was selected by the Cleveland Browns in the fourth round with the 110th overall pick in the 2021 NFL draft, which they acquired in a trade that sent Genard Avery to the Philadelphia Eagles. On May 18, Hudson signed his four-year rookie contract with Cleveland, worth $4.16 million.

=== New York Giants ===
On March 13, 2025, Hudson signed a two-year contract with the New York Giants. On the first drive of their week two game against the Dallas Cowboys on September 14, Hudson committed four fouls in six plays that incurred penalties (two false starts and two unnecessary roughness personal fouls), costing the Giants 40 yards and leading to him being benched for Marcus Mbow. He had been starting in place of Andrew Thomas, who was injured.

On March 6, 2026, Hudson was released by the Giants.

=== New England Patriots ===
On March 23, 2026, Hudson signed a one-year, $1.4 million contract with the New England Patriots. On August 30, he was released by New England as a part of final roster cuts.

=== Tennessee Titans ===
On August 31, 2026, Hudson was claimed off of waivers by the Tennessee Titans.
