= Jaxson Dart =

American football player (born 2003)

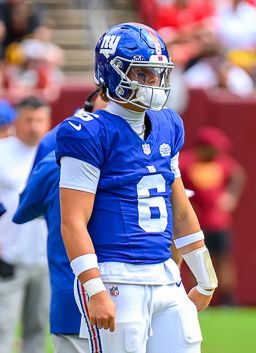
- Dart with the New York Giants in 2025

No. 6 – New York Giants
- Position: Quarterback
- Roster status: Injured reserve

Personal information
- Born: May 13, 2003 (age 23); Kaysville, Utah, U.S.
- Listed height: 6 ft 2 in (1.88 m)
- Listed weight: 223 lb (101 kg)

Career information
- High school: Corner Canyon (Draper, Utah)
- College: USC (2021); Ole Miss (2022–2024)
- NFL draft: 2025: 1st round, 25th overall pick

Career history
- New York Giants (2025–present)

Awards and highlights
- NCAA passer rating leader (2024); Conerly Trophy (2024); First-team All-SEC (2024)

Career NFL statistics as of 2026
- Passing attempts: 373
- Passing completions: 242
- Completion percentage: 64.9%
- TD–INT: 18–5
- Passing yards: 2,522
- Passer rating: 94.8
- Rushing yards: 541
- Rushing touchdowns: 9
- Stats at Pro Football Reference

Jaxson Chase Dart (born May 13, 2003) is an American professional football quarterback for the New York Giants of the National Football League (NFL). Dart played college football for the USC Trojans and Ole Miss Rebels and was selected by the Giants in the first round of the 2025 NFL draft.

== Early life ==
Dart was born on May 13, 2003, in Kaysville, Utah, to Kara (née Campbell) and Brandon Dart. His maternal grandmother Patricia Lenore Campbell was the daughter of U.S. Secretary of the Treasury David M. Kennedy. Dart was raised in the Church of Jesus Christ of Latter Day Saints. He attended Roy High School for his first three years of high school before transferring to Corner Canyon High School in Draper, Utah. As a senior, Dart was the Gatorade Football Player of the Year after throwing for 4,691 yards with a state record 67 touchdowns and only four interceptions while also rushing for 1,195 yards and 12 touchdowns. He was also the MaxPreps National Player of the Year. Overall, Dart finished his high school career with 10,688 passing yards and 117 touchdowns.

In addition to playing football in high school, Dart was also a two-time all-state third baseman for the baseball team.

Despite an offer from Arizona State University and off-season training with former ASU quarterback Taylor Kelly in Tempe, Arizona, Dart committed to the University of Southern California (USC) to play college football.

College recruiting
Name	Hometown	School	Height	Weight	Commit date
Jaxson Dart; QB	Draper, Utah	Corner Canyon	6 ft 3 in (1.91 m)	210 lb (95 kg)	Dec 16, 2020
Jaxson Dart; QB	Recruit ratings: Rivals: 247Sports: (89)				
Overall recruit ranking:
Note: In many cases, Scout, Rivals, 247Sports, On3, and ESPN may conflict in their listings of height and weight.; In these cases, the average was taken. ESPN grades are on a 100-point scale.; Sources: "2021 Team Ranking". Rivals.com.

== College career ==
=== USC (2021) ===
Dart competed to be Kedon Slovis's backup quarterback his first year at USC in 2021. On September 18, Dart entered the game against Washington State in the second drive of the game, replacing injured quarterback Slovis. USC was playing their first game after the firing of coach Clay Helton. Dart entered the game and threw an interception to end his first drive, but responded by throwing a 38-yard touchdown pass late in the first half. Dart finished the game completing 30-for-46 passes for 391 yards, four touchdowns, and two interceptions. The Trojans defeated the Cougars 42–14, in a blowout win. Dart's 391 yards set the record for most passing yards ever by a USC QB in a debut, breaking JT Daniels’ record of 282 in 2018.

On November 20, Dart made his first career start against UCLA.

=== Ole Miss (2022–2024) ===
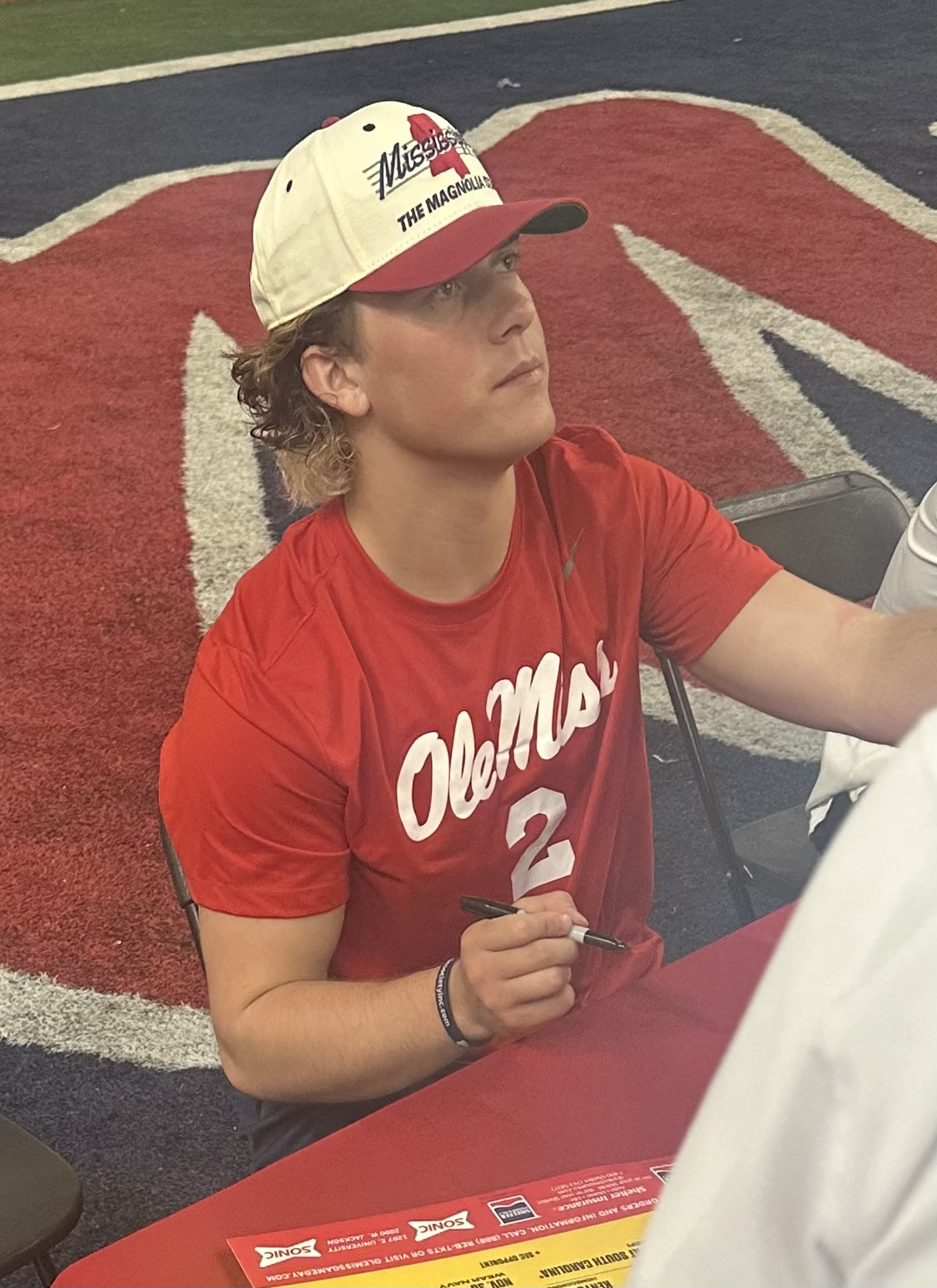
Dart in 2024

Following the 2021 season, Lincoln Riley was hired as the head coach of USC. Amidst the rumors that Oklahoma quarterback Caleb Williams would follow Riley to USC, Dart entered the NCAA transfer portal. Dart and USC teammate Michael Trigg then officially enrolled at Ole Miss, where Dart was the starting quarterback for all but one game for head coach Lane Kiffin.

Dart and Ole Miss won the Peach Bowl in 2023 against Penn State and the nation's top defense, where he faced eventual third overall pick and Giants teammate Abdul Carter. He ended the season with an NCAA-leading 180.7 passer rating. Overall, Dart started 38 games at Ole Miss, leading the team to back-to-back 10-win seasons and finished as the program's all-time leader in passing yards, surpassing Eli Manning.

== Professional career ==
Pre-draft measurables
Height	Weight	Arm length	Hand span	Wingspan
6 ft 2 1/4 in (1.89 m)	223 lb (101 kg)	30 in (0.76 m)	9 1/2 in (0.24 m)	6 ft 0 7/8 in (1.85 m)
All values from NFL Combine

Entering the 2025 NFL draft, Dart was considered a mobile quarterback with capable arm strength and accuracy. However, his mental processing once the play begins was touted as a concern since he had a tendency to focus solely on his first target. He was projected to be picked in the first two rounds.

Dart was selected by the New York Giants in the first round with the 25th overall pick. The team had traded up from the early second round back into the first round.

=== 2025 season ===
Dart began his rookie season as the backup to Russell Wilson. On September 23, 2025, after a 0–3 start to the season for the Giants, Dart was announced as the new starting quarterback in the Week 4 matchup against the Los Angeles Chargers. In his first start, the Giants beat the then-undefeated Chargers on September 28 and Dart completed 13-of-20 passes for 111 yards and adding a rushing touchdown.

On October 9, Dart defeated the defending champion Philadelphia Eagles, completing 17-of-25 passes for 195 yards and rushing 13 times for 58 yards. He joined Patrick Mahomes as the only quarterbacks since at least 1991 to lead their teams to an opening-drive touchdown in each of their first three career starts.

In the Week 10 game against the Chicago Bears, Dart suffered a concussion in the third quarter and missed the rest of the game as the Giants lost 24–20. Third-string quarterback Jameis Winston took over as the starter for the next two games.

=== 2026 season ===
Dart made his first career Week 1 start on September 13, 2026, against the Dallas Cowboys. He completed 23-of-29 passes for 230 yards in a 28–20 win to give the Giants their first opening game win since 2022.

During Monday Night Football against the Los Angeles Rams in Week 2, Dart departed after suffering a left knee injury. On September 23, it was revealed that Dart had suffered significant damage to his left knee, including the meniscus, MCL, and PCL, which required surgery and prematurely ended his 2026 season.

== Player profile ==
Dart is characterized as having a high-contact playing style, one that The Guardian described as being like a "linebacker at quarterback". Lauded as a dual-threat quarterback, he had nine rushing touchdowns as a rookie in 2025 (the second most among quarterbacks) and recorded five games wherein he threw and ran for a touchdown apiece. However, he frequently opts to absorb tackles on the run rather than slide or go out of bounds; while this enables him to gain additional yards, it also makes him susceptible to injuries like concussions. As a rookie, Dart underwent five concussion tests, one of which resulted in fines when head coach Brian Daboll and teammate Cam Skattebo entered the medical tent during the game. He was also evaluated for a concussion in the first preseason game of 2026 when he took a hard hit on a blitz. His approach prompted the Giants to urge him to take less contact in order to avoid future injuries.

Dart has defended his style of play. When asked in November 2025 about if he was being reckless, he explained:

"[T]his is football. Like, I'm going to get hit if I'm in the pocket or outside the pocket. I feel like I played this way my whole entire life. It shouldn't be any shocker to anybody if you followed along with my career. We're not playing soccer out here. You're going to get hit. Things happen. It's just part of the game."

== Career statistics ==
Legend
**Bold**	Career high

=== NFL ===
Year	Team	Games			Passing										Rushing					Sacks		Fumbles	
Year	Team	GP	GS	Record	Cmp	Att	Pct	Yds	Y/A	Y/G	Lng	TD	Int	Rtg	Att	Yds	Y/A	Lng	TD	Sck	SckY	Fum	Lost
2025	NYG	14	12	4−8	216	339	63.7	2,272	6.7	162.3	44	15	5	91.7	86	487	5.7	29	9	35	152	5	2
2026	NYG	2	2	1−1	26	34	76.5	250	7.4	125.0	19	3	0	125.9	11	54	4.9	22	0	2	1	1	0
Career		16	14	5−9	242	373	64.9	2,522	6.8	157.6	44	18	5	94.8	97	541	5.6	29	9	37	153	6	2

=== College ===
Legend
Led the NCAA

College statistics
Season	Team	Games			Passing								Rushing			
Season	Team	GP	GS	Record	Cmp	Att	Pct	Yds	Avg	TD	Int	Rtg	Att	Yds	Avg	TD
2021	USC	6	3	0–3	117	189	61.9	1,353	7.2	9	5	132.5	22	43	2.0	2
2022	Ole Miss	13	12	7–5	226	362	62.4	2,974	8.2	20	**11**	143.6	**128**	**614**	**4.8**	1
2023	Ole Miss	13	13	**11–2**	233	358	65.1	3,364	9.4	23	5	162.4	119	391	3.3	**8**
2024	Ole Miss	13	13	10–3	**276**	**398**	**69.3**	**4,279**	**10.8**	**29**	6	**180.7**	124	495	4.0	3
Career		45	41	28–13	852	1,307	65.2	11,970	9.2	81	27	158.4	393	1,541	3.9	14

== Personal life ==
Dart has a brother and two sisters. He is a member of the Church of Jesus Christ of Latter-day Saints.

Fishing is a lifelong hobby of Dart, who credits it with teaching him patience. He has also been a fan of Star Wars since childhood; Dart wears eye black styled after Anakin Skywalker's scar since his friends thought the paint and his long hair made him resemble the character in Revenge of the Sith.

On May 22, 2026, Dart appeared at a campaign rally for U.S. Representative Mike Lawler, where he introduced President Donald Trump.
