= Roy Robertson-Harris =

American football player (born 1993)

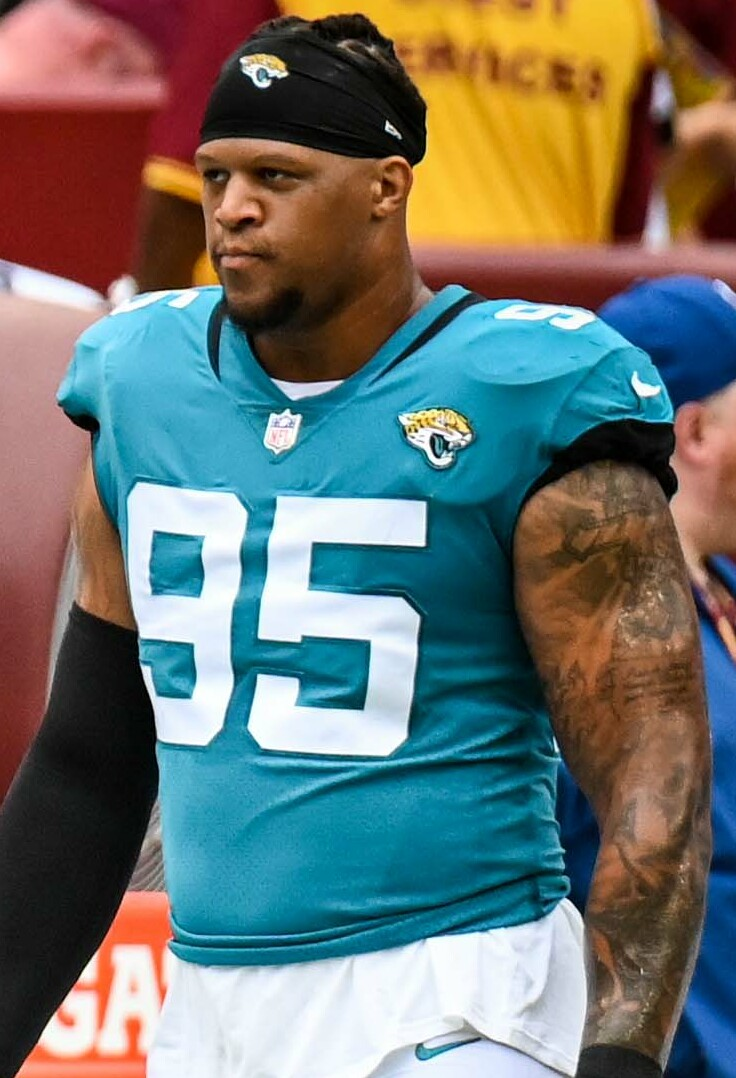
- Robertson-Harris with the Jacksonville Jaguars in 2022

No. 95 – New York Giants
- Position: Defensive tackle
- Roster status: Injured reserve

Personal information
- Born: July 23, 1993 (age 33); Oakland, California, U.S.
- Listed height: 6 ft 7 in (2.01 m)
- Listed weight: 300 lb (136 kg)

Career information
- High school: South Grand Prairie (Grand Prairie, Texas)
- College: UTEP (2011–2015)
- NFL draft: 2016: undrafted

Career history
- Chicago Bears (2016–2020); Jacksonville Jaguars (2021–2024); Seattle Seahawks (2024); New York Giants (2025–present)

Career NFL statistics as of 2025
- Total tackles: 246
- Sacks: 19
- Fumble recoveries: 1
- Pass deflections: 15
- Stats at Pro Football Reference

Roy Robertson-Harris (born July 23, 1993) is an American professional football defensive tackle for the New York Giants of the National Football League (NFL). He played college football for the UTEP Miners. Robertson-Harris has previously played in the NFL for the Chicago Bears, Jacksonville Jaguars, and Seattle Seahawks.

== Professional career ==
Pre-draft measurables
Height	Weight	Arm length	Hand span	Wingspan	40-yard dash	10-yard split	20-yard split	20-yard shuttle	Three-cone drill	Vertical jump	Broad jump	Bench press
6 ft 5 3/8 in (1.97 m)	256 lb (116 kg)	33 1/8 in (0.84 m)	9 1/4 in (0.23 m)	6 ft 10 1/4 in (2.09 m)	4.84 s	1.77 s	2.77 s	4.26 s	7.31 s	35.0 in (0.89 m)	9 ft 11 in (3.02 m)	23 reps
All values from Pro Day

=== Chicago Bears ===
After going undrafted in the 2016 NFL draft, Robertson-Harris signed with the Chicago Bears on May 9, 2016. On August 30, he was placed on the reserve/non-football illness list, where he spent his entire rookie season.

In 2017, Robertson-Harris appeared in 13 games, registering 13 tackles, two sacks, and a pass deflection. The following year, he played in every game as he recorded 20 tackles, three sacks and three tackles for loss. He was an exclusive-rights free agent after the 2018 season, but returned to the Bears after being tendered a contract on March 13, 2019, which he officially signed on April 15.

In week 1 of the 2019 season against the Green Bay Packers, Robertson-Harris sacked Aaron Rodgers once as the Bears lost 10–3. In week 4 against the Minnesota Vikings, Robertson-Harris sacked Kirk Cousins 1.5 times in the 16–6 win.

On March 13, 2020, the Bears placed a second-round restricted free agent tender on Robertson-Harris. He signed the tender on April 15. On November 9, it was reported that Robertson-Harris would undergo season ending shoulder surgery after missing out the Bears' Week 9 contest against the Tennessee Titans. He was placed on injured reserve on November 12.

=== Jacksonville Jaguars ===
On March 17, 2021, Robertson-Harris signed a three-year, $23.4 million contract with the Jacksonville Jaguars. On October 2, 2022, Robertson-Harris recorded nine total tackles and a tackle for loss during a 29–21 loss to the Philadelphia Eagles.

On February 25, 2023, Robertson-Harris signed a three-year, $30 million extension with the Jaguars, keeping him under contract through the 2026 season.

=== Seattle Seahawks ===
On October 14, 2024, Robertson-Harris was traded to the Seattle Seahawks in exchange for a 2026 sixth-round pick.

On March 4, 2025, Robertson-Harris was released by the Seahawks.

=== New York Giants ===
On March 10, 2025, Robertson-Harris signed a two-year, $10 million contract with the New York Giants. He started all 17 games in 2025, recording 35 tackles.

Robertson-Harris suffered a torn Achilles in 2026 offseason workouts and was placed on injured reserve on August 5, 2026.

== NFL career statistics ==
Legend
	Led the league
**Bold**	Career high

=== Regular season ===
Year	Team	Games		Tackles					Interceptions						Fumbles				
Year	Team	GP	GS	Cmb	Solo	Ast	Sck	TFL	Int	Yds	Avg	Lng	TD	PD	FF	Fum	FR	Yds	TD
2017	CHI	13	0	13	8	5	2.0	2	0	0	0.0	0	0	1	0	0	**1**	0	0
2018	CHI	16	0	22	10	12	3.0	3	0	0	0.0	0	0	2	0	0	0	0	0
2019	CHI	15	7	30	22	8	2.5	3	0	0	0.0	0	0	3	0	0	0	0	0
2020	CHI	8	6	10	7	3	0.0	1	0	0	0.0	0	0	0	0	0	0	0	0
2021	JAX	14	13	37	21	16	3.0	4	0	0	0.0	0	0	2	0	0	0	0	0
2022	JAX	17	17	**45**	**28**	17	3.0	**7**	0	0	0.0	0	0	**4**	0	0	0	0	0
2023	JAX	17	17	34	16	**18**	**3.5**	3	0	0	0.0	0	0	1	0	0	0	0	0
2024	JAX	6	2	7	5	2	2.0	3	0	0	0.0	0	0	0	0	0	0	0	0
2024	SEA	11	0	13	5	8	0.0	1	0	0	0.0	0	0	1	0	0	0	0	0
2025	NYG	17	17	35	19	16	0.0	3	0	0	0.0	0	0	1	0	0	0	0	0
Career		134	79	246	141	105	19.0	30	0	0	0.0	0	0	15	0	0	1	0	0

=== Postseason ===
Year	Team	Games		Tackles					Interceptions						Fumbles				
Year	Team	GP	GS	Cmb	Solo	Ast	Sck	TFL	Int	Yds	Avg	Lng	TD	PD	FF	Fum	FR	Yds	TD
2018	CHI	1	0	0	0	0	0.0	0	0	0	0.0	0	0	0	0	0	0	0	0
2022	JAX	2	2	**14**	**7**	**7**	**1.0**	**5**	0	0	0.0	0	0	**2**	0	0	0	0	0
Career		3	2	14	7	7	1.0	5	0	0	0.0	0	0	2	0	0	0	0	0
