= Andrew Thomas (American football) =

American football player (born 1999)

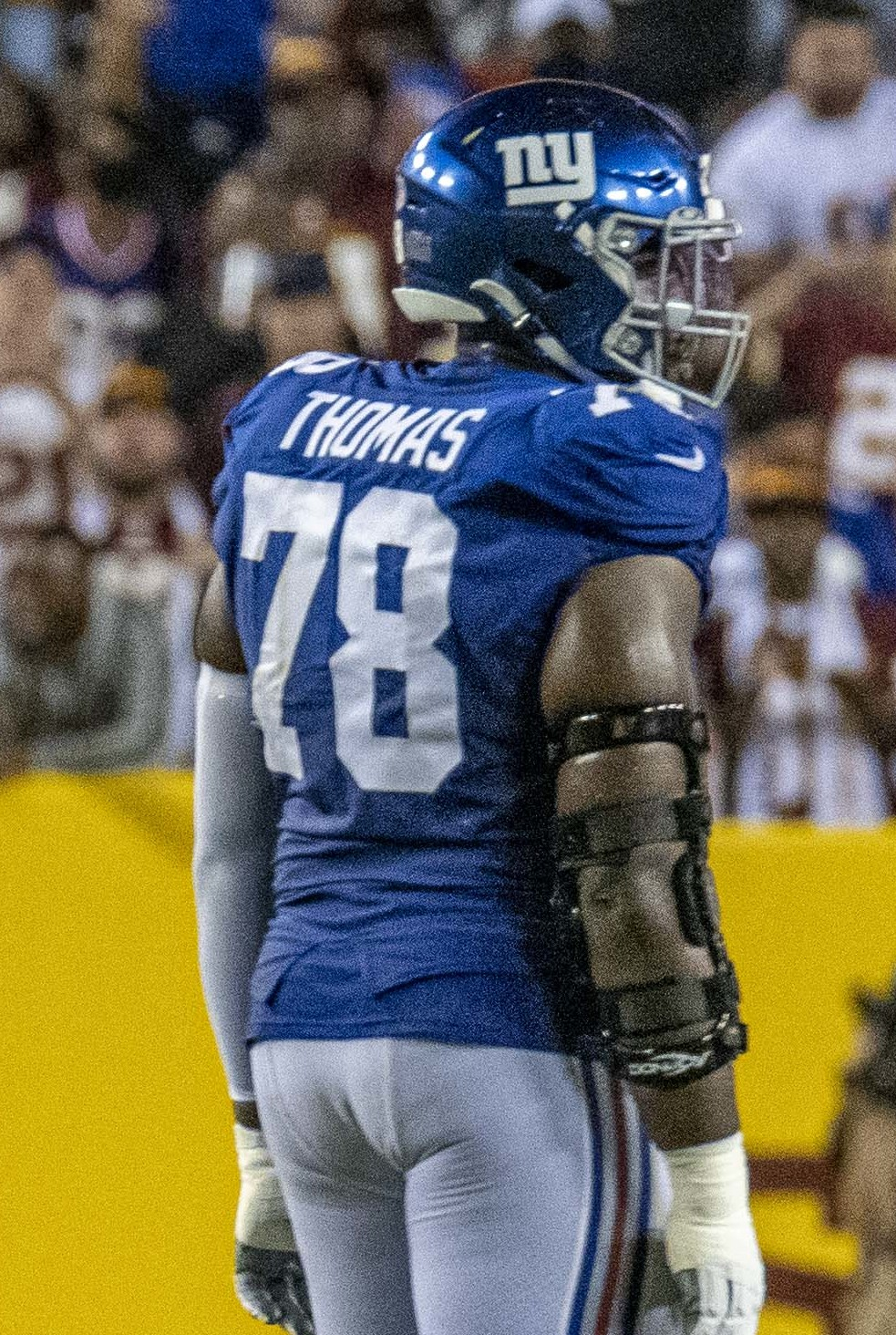
- Thomas with the New York Giants in 2021

No. 78 – New York Giants
- Position: Offensive tackle
- Roster status: Active

Personal information
- Born: January 22, 1999 (age 27); Lithonia, Georgia, U.S.
- Listed height: 6 ft 5 in (1.96 m)
- Listed weight: 315 lb (143 kg)

Career information
- High school: Pace Academy (Atlanta, Georgia)
- College: Georgia (2017–2019)
- NFL draft: 2020: 1st round, 4th overall pick

Career history
- New York Giants (2020–present)

Awards and highlights
- Second-team All-Pro (2022); Jacobs Blocking Trophy (2019); Unanimous All-American (2019); First-team All-American (2018); 2× First-team All-SEC (2018, 2019); Freshman All-American (2017)

Career NFL statistics as of Week 1, 2026
- Games played: 75
- Games started: 74
- Stats at Pro Football Reference

Andrew Ken Thomas (born January 22, 1999) is an American professional football offensive tackle for the New York Giants of the National Football League (NFL). He played college football for the Georgia Bulldogs and was selected by the Giants fourth overall in the 2020 NFL draft.

== Early life ==
Thomas attended Pace Academy in Atlanta. Following his high school career, Thomas played at the Army All-American Game. He committed to Georgia on July 10, 2016, choosing the Bulldogs over offers from Alabama, Auburn, Florida and others.

== College career ==
Thomas started every game at right tackle his true freshman season, earning him a Freshman All-American accolade after the conclusion of the season. Thomas switched to left tackle for his sophomore season. He injured his left ankle playing South Carolina, and didn't play the following game against Middle Tennessee. During the next two games, Thomas worked his way back to full participation, though he was forced to wear a brace after re-injuring the ankle later in the season. After helping to pave the way for 331 rushing yards against Kentucky, Thomas was named the Southeastern Conference (SEC) offensive lineman of the week. He was named a first-team All American and to the first-team All-SEC after the season.

Thomas was also invited to the NCAA Elite Football Synopsium in the winter following his sophomore season; the program helps athletes prepare for the transition from college to the NFL. Before his junior season, Thomas projected out as a potential first-round pick in the 2020 NFL draft if he chose to leave Georgia after his junior year. On December 17, 2019, Thomas announced that he would forgo his senior year and enter the 2020 NFL draft, thus also skipping the 2020 Sugar Bowl.

== Professional career ==
Pre-draft measurables
Height	Weight	Arm length	Hand span	Wingspan	40-yard dash	10-yard split	20-yard split	20-yard shuttle	Three-cone drill	Vertical jump	Broad jump	Bench press	Wonderlic
6 ft 5 1/8 in (1.96 m)	315 lb (143 kg)	36 1/8 in (0.92 m)	10 1/4 in (0.26 m)	6 ft 11 1/2 in (2.12 m)	5.22 s	1.83 s	3.02 s	4.66 s	7.58 s	30.5 in (0.77 m)	9 ft 1 in (2.77 m)	21 reps	28
All values from NFL Combine

Thomas was selected by the New York Giants in the first round (4th overall) of the 2020 NFL draft.

Thomas played left tackle for the first five weeks of his rookie season. Thomas was relieved of duties by Matt Peart during their Week 6 match against Washington because he arrived late for a team meeting. He ended up starting the remainder of the season at left tackle.

Thomas entered the 2021 season as the Giants starting left tackle. He suffered an ankle injury in Week 6 and was placed on injured reserve on October 19, 2021. On November 22, Thomas was activated from injured reserve. The same day, Thomas scored his first career touchdown, a two-yard reception, against the Tampa Bay Buccaneers in the Giants' Week 11 game. In February 2022, Thomas underwent surgery to repair the same left ankle that he had injured earlier in the season.

On July 26, 2023, Thomas signed a five–year, $117.5 million contract extension with the Giants. The deal included $67 million guaranteed at signing and set a new NFL record for an offensive lineman.

On October 15, 2024, Thomas underwent successful surgery to repair a Lisfranc injury in his foot suffered during the Giants' week 6 matchup against the Cincinnati Bengals. As a result, he missed the rest of the season.

Thomas entered the 2025 season as one of New York's starting tackles, recovering one fumble across 13 appearances. On December 27, 2025, Thomas was placed on season-ending injured reserve due to a hamstring injury.

=== NFL career statistics ===
Legend
**Bold**	Career high

Year	Team	Games		Offense					
Year	Team	GP	GS	Snaps	Pct	Holding	False start	Decl/Offs	Acpt/Pen
2020	NYG	16	15	976	96%	**2**	**3**	0	**5**
2021	NYG	13	13	799	95%	1	**3**	0	4
2022	NYG	16	16	**1,050**	98%	0	0	0	1
2023	NYG	10	10	577	93%	0	1	1	1
2024	NYG	6	6	419	**100%**	0	1	**2**	2
2025	NYG	13	13	802	92%	**2**	0	1	2
2026	NYG	1	1						
Career		75	74	4,623	–	5	8	4	15
