= Abdul Carter =

American football player (born 2003)

No. 3 – New York Giants
- Position: Outside linebacker
- Roster status: Active

Personal information
- Born: October 3, 2003 (age 23); Philadelphia, Pennsylvania, U.S.
- Listed height: 6 ft 4 in (1.93 m)
- Listed weight: 252 lb (114 kg)

Career information
- High school: La Salle (Wyndmoor, Pennsylvania)
- College: Penn State (2022–2024)
- NFL draft: 2025: 1st round, 3rd overall pick

Career history
- New York Giants (2025–present)

Awards and highlights
- PFWA All-Rookie Team (2025); Unanimous All-American (2024); Big Ten Defensive Player of the Year (2024); 2× first-team All-Big Ten (2023, 2024); Second-team All-Big Ten (2022)

Career NFL statistics as of Week 3, 2026
- Tackles: 49
- Sacks: 5
- Forced fumbles: 2
- Fumble recoveries: 2
- Stats at Pro Football Reference

Abdul Jabar Carter (born October 3, 2003) is an American professional football outside linebacker for the New York Giants of the National Football League (NFL). He played college football for the Penn State Nittany Lions and was selected by the Giants third overall in the 2025 NFL draft.

== Early life ==
Carter was born on October 3, 2003, in Philadelphia, Pennsylvania, growing up in North Philadelphia. He attended La Salle College High School in Wyndmoor, Pennsylvania. As a senior, he made 78 tackles with 10 tackles for loss. Carter was rated a four-star recruit and committed to play college football for Penn State over offers from South Carolina and Ole Miss. Following the end of his senior season, he played in the Big 33 Football Classic.

As a native of North Philadelphia, Carter grew up a fan of the Philadelphia Eagles, attending their Super Bowl LIX victory in New Orleans with his father in 2025.

== College career ==
Carter enrolled at Pennsylvania State University in June 2022 shortly after graduating high school. He was ejected for targeting in his collegiate debut against Purdue. Carter served as a key reserve at linebacker at the beginning of his freshman season. He made his first career start in Penn State's seventh game of the season against Minnesota. Carter finished the season with 56 tackles, 10.5 tackles for loss, a team-leading 6.5 sacks, two forced fumbles, and four passes broken up and was named second-team All-Big Ten Conference. In 2024, Carter was named the Big Ten Defensive Player of the Year and a unanimous All-American. He declared for the 2025 NFL draft following Penn State's loss in the 2025 Orange Bowl.

College statistics
Year	Team	Games		Tackles				Fumbles				Interceptions			
Year	Team	GP	GS	Cmb	Solo	Ast	Sck	FF	FR	Yds	TD	Int	Yds	TD	PD
2022	Penn State	13	6	56	36	20	6.5	2	0	0	0	0	0	0	4
2023	Penn State	13	13	48	25	23	4.5	1	0	0	0	1	18	0	5
2024	Penn State	16	16	68	43	25	12	2	0	0	0	0	0	0	4
Career		39	39	172	104	68	23	5	0	0	0	1	18	0	13

== Professional career ==
Pre-draft measurables
Height	Weight	Arm length	Hand span	Wingspan
6 ft 3 3/4 in (1.92 m)	250 lb (113 kg)	33 in (0.84 m)	9 3/4 in (0.25 m)	6 ft 7 1/4 in (2.01 m)
All values from Pro Day

Carter was selected by the New York Giants with the third overall pick in the 2025 NFL draft. On May 22, 2025, Carter signed a four-year, $45.2 million contract that was fully-guaranteed.

Carter was disciplined for multiple games in his 2025 rookie season. Against the Packers in Week 11, Carter was benched for the opening series reportedly due to sleeping during a walk-through practice; Carter claimed he was instead getting treatment, and interim coach Mike Kafka declined to comment. Against the Patriots in Week 13, Carter was benched for the entire first quarter after missing a meeting the previous week.

Although Carter started the season slow with only half a sack and one tackle for loss through the first 12 games even though he played the majority of defensive snaps in each game, he finished the season strong with at least half a sack in each of his games in December. Carter finished fifth for the 2025 NFL Defensive Rookie of the Year by The Associated Press.

== NFL career statistics ==
=== Regular season ===
Year	Team	Games		Tackles					Interceptions						Fumbles				
Year	Team	GP	GS	Cmb	Solo	Ast	Sck	TFL	Int	Yds	Avg	Lng	TD	PD	FF	Fum	FR	Yds	TD
2025	NYG	17	6	43	25	18	4	7	0	0	0.0	0	0	0	2	0	2	-3	0
2026	NYG	4	4	9	2	7	1	1	0	0	0.0	0	0	0	0	0	0	0	0
Career		21	10	52	27	25	5	8	0	0	0.0	0	0	0	2	0	2	-3	0

== Personal life ==
Carter is Muslim. He is nicknamed "Darth Vader" after the character of the same name from the Star Wars franchise, donning the moniker on his eye black during games.

In April 2024, Carter was charged with a misdemeanor for assaulting a tow truck driver who was towing Carter's car for parking without a permit. Carter was accused of forcefully pulling the driver from his truck, throwing him to the ground and not allowing him to get up, leaving the driver with a fractured rib. Carter took part in a year-long intervention program.
