= Jude McAtamney =

Player of American football (born 2000)

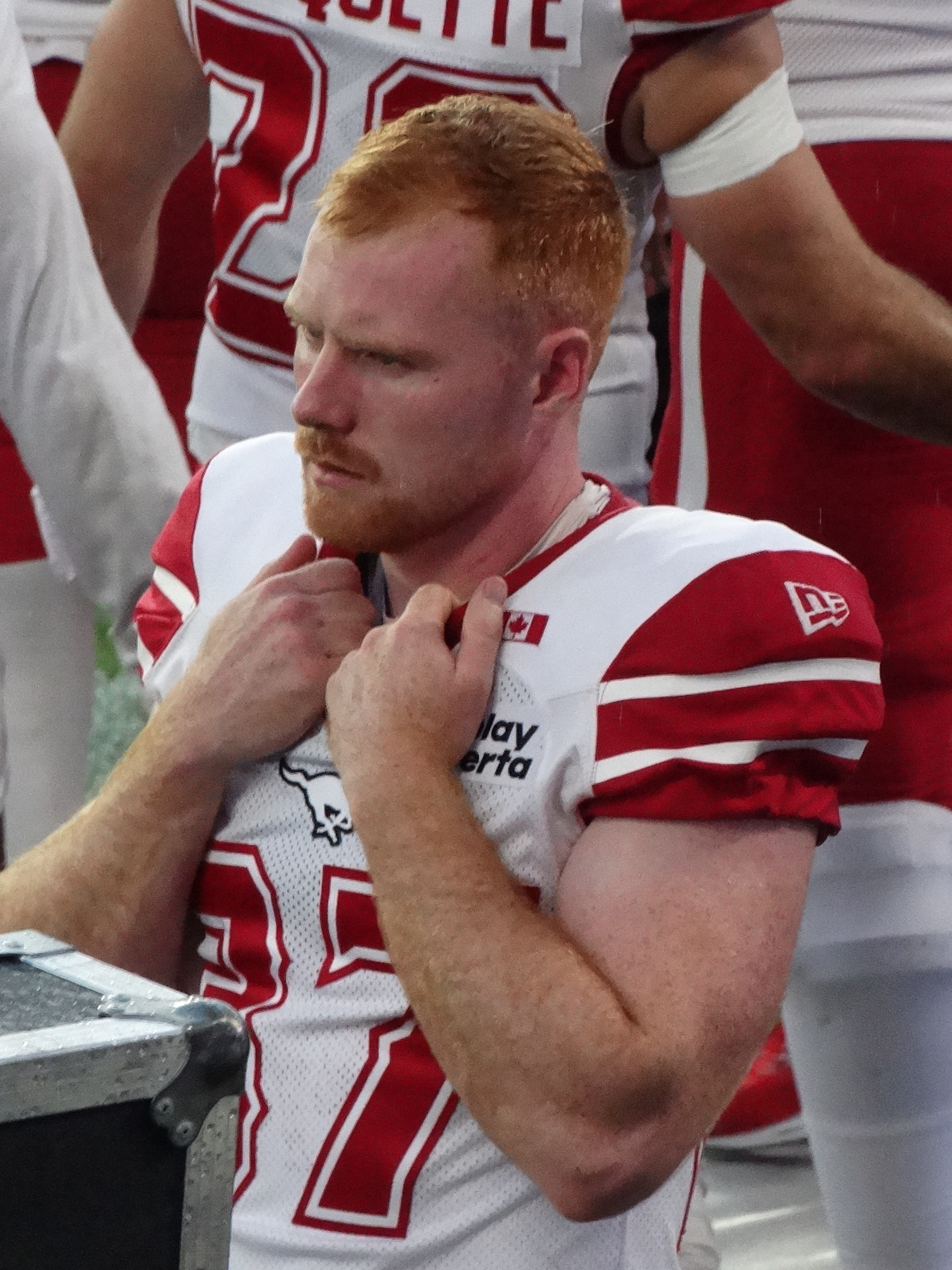
- McAtamney with the Calgary Stampeders in 2026

No. 37 – Calgary Stampeders
- Position: Placekicker
- Roster status: Reserve
- CFL status: Global

Personal information
- Born: 9 May 2000 (age 26); Derry, Northern Ireland
- Listed height: 6 ft 1 in (1.85 m)
- Listed weight: 215 lb (98 kg)

Career information
- High school: St Patrick's College, Maghera (Maghera, County Londonderry )
- College: Chowan (2021); Rutgers (2022–2023)
- NFL draft: 2024: undrafted
- CFL draft: 2026G: 1st round, 6th overall pick

Career history
- New York Giants (2024–2025); Calgary Stampeders (2026–present)

Career NFL statistics
- Field goals made: 3
- Field goals attempted: 3
- Field goal %: 100
- Extra points made: 10
- Extra points attempted: 13
- Extra point %: 76.9
- Points: 19
- Longest field goal: 31
- Stats at Pro Football Reference

Career CFL statistics as of 2026
- Field goals made: 22
- Field goals attempted: 26
- Field goal %: 84.6
- Extra points made: 39
- Extra points attempted: 41
- Extra point %: 95.1
- Longest field goal: 57
- Stats at CFL.ca

Jude McAtamney (mick-ə-TOM-nay; born 9 May 2000) is a professional gridiron football placekicker for the Calgary Stampeders of the Canadian Football League (CFL) from Northern Ireland. He previously played for the New York Giants of the National Football League (NFL). Originally a Gaelic footballer, he later switched to American football and played at college level for the Chowan Hawks and Rutgers Scarlet Knights. McAtamney signed with the Giants as an undrafted free agent in 2024.

== Early life ==
McAtamney was born in Derry, Northern Ireland. His grandfather, Harry Cassidy, was a Gaelic footballer for, and manager of, Bellaghy GAC and the Derry county football team. McAtamney grew up in the village of Swatragh and played Gaelic football with his six brothers. McAtamney later played for the under-20 football team of Derry GAA and helped them win the Ulster Under-20 Football Championship in 2018.

McAtamney attended St Patrick's College, Maghera, and later studied for two years at St Mary's University College, Belfast.

== College football career ==
In May 2020, McAtamney became interested in American football after noticing, through Twitter, Irish punter David Shanahan accept an athletic scholarship to play college football in the US for the Georgia Tech Yellow Jackets. McAtamney bought some equipment on eBay and began practising at a local Gaelic football field. He recorded himself and sent a message to Shanahan, who referred McAtamney to ProKick Australia, a program to help develop college football punters and placekickers.

Those at ProKick were impressed by McAtamney but he was unable to travel to Australia due to COVID-19 restrictions. After several months, Tom Hackett offered to work with him and Shanahan in the US, in January 2021. They trained for two weeks in Serbia and then were cleared to travel. McAtamney trained with Hackett for several months and was able to consistently make 50-yard field goals in practice. He later returned to Swatragh and continued training, being able to make field goals of over 60 yards by June 2021.

In July 2021, McAtamney received and accepted a scholarship offer to play for the Chowan Hawks of Chowan University in North Carolina, an NCAA Division II program. In his first season, McAtamney appeared in nine games and made 6-of-10 field goal attempts while converting all 47 of his extra point attempts, also having 60 kickoffs with 19 touchbacks. He entered the NCAA transfer portal after the year and underwent training with ProKick in Australia in the 2022 off-season.

McAtamney ultimately transferred to the FBS-level Rutgers Scarlet Knights and won the starting placekicker role. That season, he was successful on 12-of-18 field goals, with a long of 49 yards, and made 23-of-24 extra points in 12 games played. McAtamney was the team's leading scorer with 59 total points and also made 47 kickoffs for 2,787 yards with 17 touchbacks. In his last year, (Note: McAtamney only had three years of eligibility in college football due to having attended St Mary's University College, Belfast, for a time.) McAtamney only attempted one field goal, a miss, after having been replaced by Jai Patel, but remained the kickoff specialist, posting a team record 40 touchbacks on 60 kickoffs.

== Professional career ==
Pre-draft measurables
Height	Weight	Arm length	Hand span	Wingspan
6 ft 1 in (1.85 m)	208 lb (94 kg)	30 5/8 in (0.78 m)	8 1/4 in (0.21 m)	6 ft 2 in (1.88 m)
All values from Pro Day

=== New York Giants ===
After impressing at his pro day, McAtamney was invited to try out for the New York Giants, where he made all 10 of his attempted kicks in front of scouts. McAtamney was not selected in the 2024 NFL draft, but he signed with the Giants as an undrafted free agent afterwards. McAtamney was assigned the team's exempt/international roster spot as part of the International Player Pathway Program (IPPP).

Having been called up off the practice squad onto the Giants roster, McAtamney made his NFL debut against the Washington Commanders on 3 November 2024, kicking an extra point and a 31-yard field goal. He signed a reserve/future contract on 6 January 2025.

On August 26, 2025, McAtamney was waived by the Giants as part of final roster cuts, and was re-signed to the practice squad the next day. On September 27, he was promoted to the active roster after Graham Gano was injured. On October 9, McAtamney was signed to the active roster, despite the Giants being able to promote him one more time from the practice squad before having to sign him.

In a Week 7 matchup against the Denver Broncos, McAtamney missed two extra-point attempts, including one with 0:37 left in the fourth quarter, which would have given the Giants a 3-point lead; the Giants would go on to lose 33–32 after Wil Lutz kicked a 39-yard field goal as time expired. McAtamney was cut by the Giants on October 21, and re-signed to the practice squad. On November 24, McAtamney was released from the practice squad.

=== Calgary Stampeders ===
McAtamney was later drafted in the first round (6th overall) by the Calgary Stampeders in the 2026 CFL global draft; he signed with the team on May 2, 2026.

== See also ==
- List of players who have converted from one football code to another
