= Trace Ford =

American football player (born 2001)

No. 48 – New York Giants
- Position: Linebacker
- Roster status: Active

Personal information
- Born: January 24, 2001 (age 25); Oklahoma City, Oklahoma, U.S.
- Listed height: 6 ft 2 in (1.88 m)
- Listed weight: 252 lb (114 kg)

Career information
- High school: Edmond Santa Fe (Edmond, Oklahoma)
- College: Oklahoma State (2019–2022); Oklahoma (2023–2024)
- NFL draft: 2025: undrafted

Career history
- New York Giants (2025–present)

Career NFL statistics as of Week 9, 2026
- Total tackles: 12
- Stats at Pro Football Reference

Trace Ford (born January 24, 2001) is an American professional football linebacker for the New York Giants of the National Football League (NFL). He played college football for the Oklahoma State Cowboys and Oklahoma Sooners.

== Early life ==
Ford was born on January 24, 2001, in Oklahoma City, Oklahoma, and is one of nine children. He attended Edmond Santa Fe High School where he competed in football, basketball and baseball. As a senior in football, Ford was named conference defensive player of the year and defensive lineman of the year after recording 40 tackles and three sacks. He was also an all-state selection. A three-star recruit, Ford committed to play college football for the Oklahoma State Cowboys.

== College career ==
As a true freshman at Oklahoma State in 2019, Ford posted 29 tackles and three sacks, earning honorable mention All-Big 12 Conference honors. In 2020, he repeated as an honorable mention All-Big 12 selection after totaling 22 tackles, 4.5 sacks and two forced fumbles. He suffered a torn ACL in the last regular season game in 2020 and then, in practice before the 2021 season, tore the same ligament, resulting in him missing the entire 2021 season. Ford played in nine games in 2022, recording eight tackles and a sack, but then missed several games due to a fractured kneecap.

After the season, Ford entered the NCAA transfer portal after transferred to the Oklahoma Sooners. He appeared in every game in his first season there and posted 18 tackles, 3.5 tackles-for-loss and an interception. Ford then had 22 tackles, 4.0 tackles-for-loss and 1.5 sacks in 2024 to conclude his collegiate career.

== Professional career ==
Pre-draft measurables
Height	Weight	Arm length	Hand span	Wingspan	40-yard dash	10-yard split	20-yard split	20-yard shuttle	Three-cone drill	Vertical jump	Broad jump	Bench press
6 ft 2 3/8 in (1.89 m)	249 lb (113 kg)	30 7/8 in (0.78 m)	9 in (0.23 m)	6 ft 2 1/4 in (1.89 m)	4.64 s	1.60 s	2.72 s	4.47 s	7.22 s	36.0 in (0.91 m)	10 ft 2 in (3.10 m)	21 reps
All values from Pro Day

After going unselected in the 2025 NFL draft, Ford signed with the New York Giants as an undrafted free agent. He was waived on August 26, 2025, then re-signed to the practice squad the next day, before being released from the practice squad on August 29. He was re-signed to the practice squad on November 13 and spent the rest of the season there before signing a reserve/future contract with the Giants on January 5, 2026.

Ford was waived by the Giants as a part of final roster cuts on August 30, 2026; he was re-signed to the practice squad the next day. Ford was elevated to the active roster for the team's Week 4 game against the Arizona Cardinals and made his NFL debut in the game, posting two tackles. He was signed to the active roster on October 20.
