= Marcus Mbow =

American football player (born 2003)

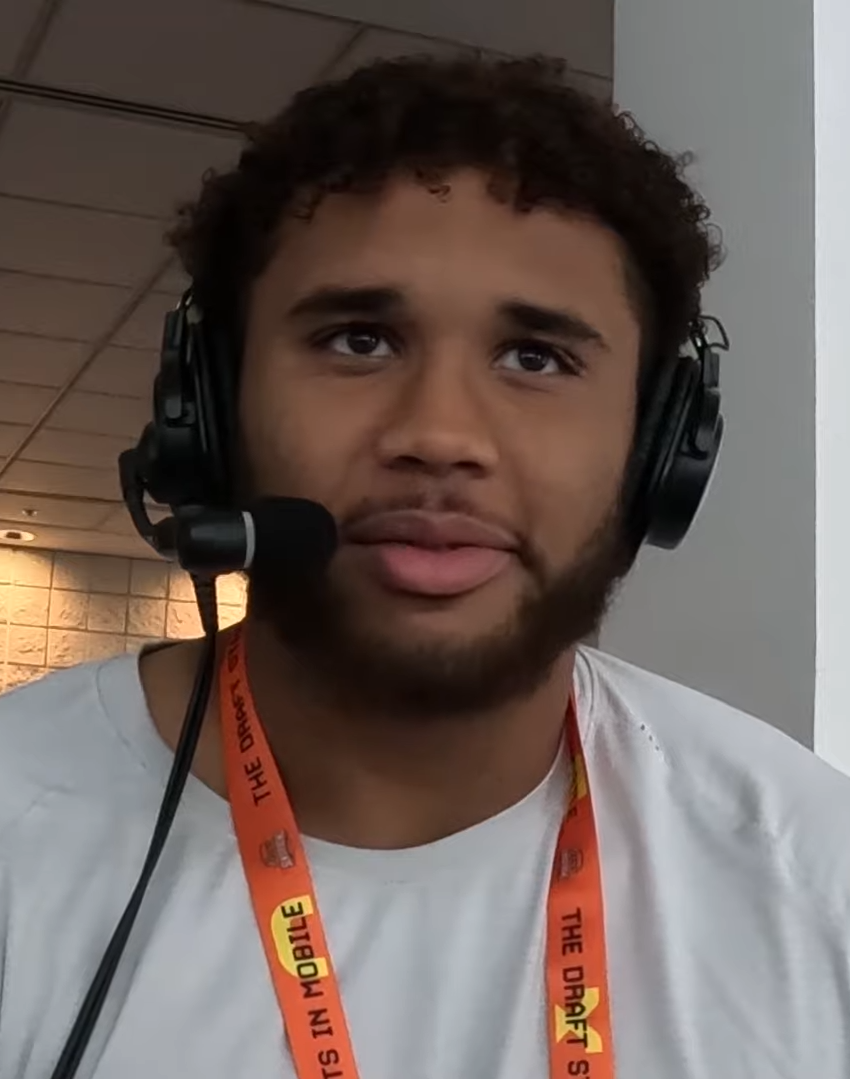
- Mbow in 2025

No. 71 – New York Giants
- Position: Offensive tackle
- Roster status: Active

Personal information
- Born: April 2, 2003 (age 23); Milwaukee, Wisconsin, U.S.
- Listed height: 6 ft 5 in (1.96 m)
- Listed weight: 300 lb (136 kg)

Career information
- High school: Wauwatosa East (Wauwatosa, Wisconsin)
- College: Purdue (2021–2024)
- NFL draft: 2025: 5th round, 154th overall pick

Career history
- New York Giants (2025–present)

Career NFL statistics as of 2025
- Games played: 6
- Games started: 1
- Stats at Pro Football Reference

Marcus Mbow (born April 2, 2003) is an American professional football offensive tackle for the New York Giants of the National Football League (NFL). He played college football for the Purdue Boilermakers and was selected by the Giants in the fifth round of the 2025 NFL draft.

== Early life ==
Mbow was born in Milwaukee, Wisconsin on April 2nd, 2003. He attended Wauwatosa East High School in Wauwatosa, Wisconsin. He originally committed to Arizona State but decommitted after they dropped his scholarship. He signed with Purdue later that year. He is of Senegalese descent through his father.

== College career ==
After appearing in four games and redshirting in 2021, Mbow started all 14 games at guard in 2022. As a redshirt sophomore in 2023 he moved to tackle and started six games before suffering a season-ending injury. He returned healthy in 2024.

== Professional career ==
Pre-draft measurables
Height	Weight	Arm length	Hand span	Wingspan	20-yard shuttle
6 ft 4 1/8 in (1.93 m)	303 lb (137 kg)	32 in (0.81 m)	10 1/2 in (0.27 m)	6 ft 8 in (2.03 m)	4.67 s
All values from the NFL Combine

In the 2025 NFL draft, the New York Giants selected Mbow in the fifth round with the 154th overall pick.
