= National Register of Historic Places listings in Henry County, Georgia =

This is a list of properties and districts in Henry County, Georgia, that are listed on the National Register of Historic Places (NRHP).

This National Park Service list is complete through NPS recent listings posted March 21, 2025.

== Current listings ==
	Name on the Register	Image	Date listed	Location	City or town	Description
1	Brown House	Brown House	August 1, 1991 (#91000908)	71 Macon St. 33°26′44″N 84°08′48″W	McDonough	Also part of the McDonough Historic District, it now houses the Genealogical Society and Family Research Library
2	Crawford-Talmadge House		April 1, 1980 (#80001091)	Northwest of Hampton at U.S. Routes 19/41 and Talmadge Rd. 33°25′44″N 84°19′42″W	Hampton	On private property with a gated road; also known as Lovejoy Plantation; was owned by Gov. & Sen. Herman Talmadge
3	Globe Hotel	Globe Hotel	September 5, 1985 (#85001980)	20 Jonesboro St. 33°26′51″N 84°08′53″W	McDonough	Also part of the McDonough Historic District, now houses Scarlett's Retreat Day Spa
4	Smith Griffin House	Smith Griffin House	December 19, 1985 (#85003225)	Off Wynn Dr. northeast of State Route 20; 33°23′57″N 84°16′01″W	Hampton	
5	Hampton Depot	Hampton Depot	September 10, 1979 (#79000730)	E. Main St. 33°23′04″N 84°17′00″W	Hampton	
6	Henderson Manufacturing Company	Henderson Manufacturing Company	October 27, 2004 (#04001180)	10 James St. 33°23′09″N 84°16′55″W	Hampton	
7	Henry County Courthouse	Henry County Courthouse	September 18, 1980 (#80001092)	Courthouse Sq. 33°26′52″N 84°08′48″W	McDonough	A contributor to the McDonough Historic District
8	James and Bertha Hooten House	James and Bertha Hooten House	May 20, 2009 (#09000327)	115 Atlanta St. 33°27′04″N 84°08′49″W	McDonough	Currently a local law office.
9	Lawrenceville Street Historic District	Lawrenceville Street Historic District	February 20, 2009 (#09000054)	Lawrenceville St., roughly between the Henry County Courthouse square and State Route 20; 33°27′00″N 84°08′42″W	McDonough	
10	Locust Grove Historic District	Locust Grove Historic District	July 18, 2016 (#16000451)	Centered along GA 42/US 23 between Hi-Hope Dr. & Grove Rd. 33°20′51″N 84°06′35″W	Locust Grove	
11	Locust Grove Institute Academic Building	Locust Grove Institute Academic Building	September 4, 1986 (#86002179)	3644 State Route 42//US 23; 33°21′07″N 84°06′50″W	Locust Grove	Now city hall
12	McDonough Historic District	McDonough Historic District	November 19, 2007 (#07001201)	Centered on Griffin St. and Keys Ferry St. 33°26′49″N 84°08′50″W	McDonough	The pictured gas station currently houses the McDonough Welcome Center, Main Street Program and McDonough Hospitality and Tourism, Inc Office
13	Walden-Turner House	Walden-Turner House	April 9, 1980 (#80001093)	State Route 42/US 23 and Ward St. 33°32′40″N 84°13′58″W	Stockbridge	Last two-story Victorian house in Stockbridge. Demolished in 2006.
