= List of Harper's Bazaar Russia cover models =

This list of Harper's Bazaar Russia cover models (1996–2022) is a catalog of cover models who have appeared on the cover of Harper's Bazaar Russia, the Russian edition of American fashion magazine Harper's Bazaar.

== 1990s ==
=== 1996 ===
Issue	Cover model	Photographer
March/April	Sharon Stone	
May/June	Elizabeth Hurley	
July/August	Amber Valletta	
September/October	Uma Thurman	Patrick Demarchelier
November/December	Kirsty Hume	

=== 1997 ===
Issue	Cover model	Photographer
January/February	Christy Turlington & Naomi Campbell	Patrick Demarchelier
March/April	Kate Moss	Patrick Demarchelier
May/June	Madonna	Mario Testino
July/August	Linda Evangelista	Patrick Demarchelier
September	Isabella Rossellini	
October	Amber Valletta	
November	Demi Moore	
December 1997	Courtney Love	

=== 1998 ===
Issue	Cover model	Photographer
January/February	Diana, Princess of Wales	
March	Ingeborga Dapkūnaitė	
April	Gwyneth Paltrow	
May	Sharon Stone	
June	Kate Moss	Patrick Demarchelier
July/August	Uma Thurman	
September	Dina Korzun	
October	Shalom Harlow	
November	Cameron Diaz & Matt Dillon	
December		

=== 1999 ===
Issue	Cover model	Photographer
January/February		
March/April		
May/June	Madonna	Patrick Demarchelier
July/August		
September	Polina & Ksenia Kutepova	
October	Meg Ryan	
November	Maggie Rizer	Inez & Vinoodh
December	Kate Moss	Richard Burbridge

== 2000s ==
=== 2000 ===
Issue	Cover model	Photographer
January/February	Tom Cruise	Patrick Demarchelier
March	Vladimir Mashkov & Ksenia Terentieva	
April	Gisele Bündchen	Mikael Jansson
May/June	Kristina Semenovskaya	
July/August	Kristina Tsirekidze	
September		
October		
November	Maria Nevskaya	
December		

=== 2001 ===
Issue	Cover model	Photographer
January/February	Georgina Grenville	Patrick Demarchelier
March		
April	Alsou	
May	Kate Hudson	Patrick Demarchelier
June	Meg Ryan	
July/August		
September		
October	Nicole Kidman	Patrick Demarchelier
November		
December	Kristina Tsirekidze	

=== 2002 ===
Issue	Cover model	Photographer
January/February	Gwyneth Paltrow	Patrick Demarchelier
March	Rie Rasmussen	Terry Tsiolis
April	Stephanie Seymour	Patrick Demarchelier
May	Erin Wasson	Nino Muñoz
June		
July/August	Karolína Kurková	Patrick Demarchelier
September	Helena Houdová	
October	Isabeli Fontana	Mark Abrahams
November	Laura Golovanova	Vladimir Fridkes
December	Tanya Ilieva	Jordan Doner

=== 2003 ===
Issue	Cover model	Photographer
January	Olga Bakhmat	Kerry Hallihan
February	Jennifer Lopez	Peter Lindbergh
March		
April		
May		
June	Natalia Vodianova	
July/August	Drew Barrymore; Cameron Diaz; Lucy Liu	Patrick Demarchelier
September		
October		
November		
December		

=== 2004 ===
Issue	Cover model	Photographer
January		
February	Kristina Tsirekidze	
March		
April	Fernanda Tavares	
May	Eva Herzigová	
June		
July/August	Beyoncé	Patrick Demarchelier
September		
October	Gisele Bündchen	Peter Lindbergh
November	Natasha Poly	Sølve Sundsbø
December		

=== 2005 ===
Issue	Cover model	Photographer
January	Isabeli Fontana	
February		
March	Fernanda Tavares	
April	Gwen Stefani	Alexi Lubomirski
May		
June	Carmen Kass	Sølve Sundsbø
July/August	Caroline Winberg	
September	Svetlana Shestakova	
October		
November		
December	Lily Cole	

=== 2006 ===
Issue	Cover model	Photographer
January		
February 2006	Querelle Jansen	
March	Eugenia Volodina	Benoit Peverelli
April	Madonna	Sølve Sundsbø
May		
June	Ekaterina Smargun	
July/August	Jennifer Aniston	Alexi Lubomirski
September	Lindsay Lohan	Alexi Lubomirski
October	Mariacarla Boscono	Peter Lindbergh
November	Mischa Barton	Peter Lindbergh
December	Crystal Renn	

=== 2007 ===
Issue	Cover model	Photographer
January	Gisele Bündchen	Peter Lindbergh
February	Paris Hilton	
April	Rachel Weisz	Alexei Hay
May	Katie Holmes	Peter Lindbergh
June	Gisele Bündchen	Greg Kadel
July	Lily Donaldson	Nathaniel Goldberg
August	Coco Rocha	Greg Kadel
September		
October	Maryna Linchuk	Greg Kadel
November	Natalie Portman	Peter Lindbergh
December	Vlada Roslyakova	

=== 2008 ===
Issue	Cover model	Photographer
January	Masha Tyelna	Kai Z. Feng
February		
March	Regina Feoktistova; Tanya Pilyukova; Olga Trokhova; Tatyana Usova; Angelika Kocheva	Mark Abrahams
April	Caroline Demarqui	
May	Demi Moore	Peter Lindbergh
June	Coco Rocha	Greg Kadel
July	Miranda Kerr	Michelangelo Di Battista
August	Gwyneth Paltrow	Peter Lindbergh
September	Valentina Zelyaeva	Mark Abrahams
October	Freja Beha Erichsen	Glen Luchford
November	Liv Tyler	Cliff Watts
December	Stella Tennant	

=== 2009 ===
Issue	Cover model	Photographer
January	Angelina Jolie	Max Vadukul
February	Irina Kulikova	Sølve Sundsbø
March	Laia Moliner	Stratis & Beva
April	Valentina Zelyaeva	Mark Pillai
May	Gisele Bündchen	Peter Lindbergh
June	Sasha Pivovarova	Igor Vishnyakov
July/August	Sienna Miller	Pavel Havlichek
September	Milla Jovovich	Igor Vishnyakov
October	Natalia Vodianova	Paola Kudacki
November	Constance Jablonski	Joshua Jordan
December	Dita Von Teese	Marcin Tyszka

== 2010s ==
=== 2010 ===
Issue	Cover model	Photographer
January	Lily Allen	Alan Gelati
February	Jacquetta Wheeler	Marcin Tyszka
March	Isabeli Fontana	Marcin Tyszka
April	Chloë Sevigny	Pavel Havlicek
May	Rosie Huntington-Whiteley	Alan Gelati
June	Astrid Muñoz	Greg Verhaeghe
July/August	Tanya Dziahileva	Danil Golovkin
September	Laetitia Casta	Marcin Tyszka
October	Eva Longoria	Billy Nava
November	Coco Rocha	Alan Gelati
December	Anna Mouglalis	Linda Bujoli

=== 2011 ===
Issue	Cover model	Photographer
January	Hilary Rhoda	Alan Gelati
February	Emily Blunt	Paola Kudacki
March	Nicole Richie	Bleacher + Everard
April	Natalia Vodianova	Bruno Barbazan
May	Helena Christensen	Luis Sanchis
June	Kate Moss	Sølve Sundsbø
July/August	Zoe Saldaña	Bleacher + Everard
September	Heidi Klum	Robert Erdmann
October	Snejana Onopka	Benjamin Alexander Huseby
November	Beyoncé	Alexi Lubomirski
December	Daphne Guinness	Alan Gelati

=== 2012 ===
Issue	Cover model	Photographer
January	Kate Beckinsale	Bleacher + Everard
February	Madonna & Andrea Riseborough	Tom Munro
March	Constance Jablonski	Natalia Alaverdian
April	Georgia May Jagger	Natalia Alaverdian
May	Renée Zellweger	Simon Upton
June	Claire Danes	Mark Abrahams
July	Natalia Vodianova & Bryan Adams	Bryan Adams
August	Maria Sharapova	Bleacher + Everard
September	Karlie Kloss	Natalia Alaverdian
October	Katie Holmes	Gilles Bensimon
November	Naomi Campbell	Natalia Alaverdian
December	Amra Cerkezovic	Natalia Alaverdian

=== 2013 ===
Issue	Cover model	Photographer
January	Kate Hudson	Camilla Åkrans
February	Anne Vyalitsyna	Bleacher + Everard
March	Bianca Balti	Natalia Alaverdian
April	Vanessa Paradis	Natalia Alaverdian
May	Diane Kruger	Mark Abrahams
June	Sarah Jessica Parker	Simon Upton
July	Gwyneth Paltrow	Daniel Jackson
August	Milou van Groesen	Natalia Alaverdian
September	Karolína Kurková	David Roemer
October	Angela Lindvall	Lado Alexi
November	Amber Heard	Bleacher + Everard
December	Milla Jovovich	Bleacher + Everard

=== 2014 ===
Issue	Cover model	Photographer
January	Madonna	Terry Richardson
February	Alessandra Ambrosio	Bleacher + Everard
March	Cindy Crawford	Xavi Gordo
April	Nadja Auermann	Alan Gelati
May	Coco Rocha	Ben Cope
June	Chanel Iman	Alexander Neumann
July	Missy Rayder	Alexander Neumann
August	Michelle Williams	Peter Lindbergh
September	Salma Hayek	Xavi Gordo
October	Jessica Stam	Bleacher + Everard
November	Katy Perry	Camilla Åkrans
December	Jennifer Lopez	Gomillion & Leupold

=== 2015 ===
Issue	Cover model	Photographer
January	Anne Hathaway	Alexi Lubomirski
February	Maryna Linchuk	Mari Sarai
March	Claudia Schiffer	Nico Bustos
April	Erin Wasson	Andrew Yee
May	Diana Vishneva	Alan Gelati
June	Diane Kruger	Daniele Duella
July	Rihanna	Norman Jean Roy
August	Enikő Mihalik	Mari Sarai
September	Katy Perry	Jean-Paul Goude
October	Arizona Muse	Jesse John Jenkins
November	Louise Pedersen	Lado Alexi
December	Uma Thurman	Mark Abrahams

=== 2016 ===
Issue	Cover model	Photographer
January	Julia Restoin Roitfeld	Mari Sarai
February	Daria Strokous	Mari Sarai
March	Celine Bouly	Agata Pospieszynska
April		
May	Lou Doillon	Agata Pospieszynska
June	Caroline Vreeland	Agata Pospieszynska
July	Helena Bonham Carter	Tom Craig
August	Karen Elson	Rachell Smith
September	Kanye West & Kim Kardashian	Karl Lagerfeld
October	Bella Hadid	Mathieu Cesar
November	Lindsey Wixson	Agata Pospieszynska
December	Natalia Siodmiak	Agata Pospieszynska

=== 2017 ===
Issue	Cover model	Photographer
January	Keira Knightley	Alexi Lubomirski
February	Lottie Moss	Rachell Smith
March	Jennifer Connelly	Michael Avedon
April	Anna Cleveland	David Roemer
May	Rozanne Verduin & Nicky Griffin	Agata Pospieszynska
June	Laura Julie	Agata Pospieszynska
July	Hirschy Grace	Agata Pospieszynska
August	Miroslava Duma	Natalia Alaverdian
September	Courtney Love & Karlie Kloss	Brigitte Lacombe
October	Liv Tyler	Agata Pospieszynska
November	Claudia Schiffer	Agata Pospieszynska
December	Chloë Sevigny	Thomas Whiteside

=== 2018 ===
Issue	Cover model	Photographer
January	Viktoriia Gerasimova	Arseny Jabiev
February	Daphne Groeneveld	Agata Pospieszynska
March	Emilia Clarke	Mariano Vivanco
April	Audrey Marnay	Agata Pospieszynska
May	Lera Abova	Agata Pospieszynska
June	Nadya Karpova	Erik Panov
July	Anine van Velzen	Agata Pospieszynska
August	Nicki Minaj	Greg Swales
September	Christina Aguilera	Mario Sorrenti
October	Chiara Ferragni & Maria Grazia Chiuri	Arseny Jabiev
November	Soo Joo Park	Arseny Jabiev
December	Lena Perminova	David Bellemere

=== 2019 ===
Issue	Cover model	Photographer
January	Karolína Kurková	Sonia Szóstak
February	Jessie Bloemendaal	Sonia Szóstak
March	Jennifer Lopez	Camilla Åkrans
April	Eva Herzigová	Philip Gay
May	Florence Welch	Nick Hudson
June	Rachel Marx	Stefano Galuzzi
July	Alicia Vikander	Mariano Vivanco
August	Sean Levy	Hördur Ingason
September	Kate Moss	Mario Sorrenti
October	Aaron Shandel & Veroniek Gielkens	Stephan Lisowski
November	McKenna Hellam	Stefano Galuzzi
December	Lily Aldridge	David Roemer

== 2020s ==
=== 2020 ===
Issue	Cover model	Photographer
January	Gisele Bündchen	Kevin O'Brien
February		
March		
April	Julia Banaś	Paul Bellaart
May	Cate Underwood	Stephan Lisowski
June	Nigina Sharipova	Stephan Lisowski
July		
August		
September		
October		
November		
December	Mariacarla Boscono	Matthew Brookes

=== 2021 ===
Issue	Cover model	Photographer
January		
February	Joan Smalls	Alvaro Beamud Cortes
March	Madison Headrick	David Roemer
April	Camilla Deterre	Bjorn Iooss
May	Evgenia Dubinova	Stephan Lisowski
June		
July	Natasja Madsen	Stephan Lisowski
August	Alina Bolotina	Pavel Kharatian
September		
October		
November	Sienna Miller	Blair Getz Mezibov
December	Suki Waterhouse	Will Vendramini

=== 2022 ===
Issue	Cover model	Photographer
January	Eeva Lioni	Stephan Lisowski
February	Anine Van Velzen	Stephan Lisowski
March	Monica Bellucci	Stephan Lisowski
April	Daria Rodionova	Daria Gritsai

== See also ==
- List of Vogue Russia cover models
