= Renford =

Renford may refer to:

- Renford Bambrough (1926–1999), British philosopher
- Renford Cogle (born 1948), singer and songwriter
- Renford Reese, professor at California State Polytechnic University
- Renford Rejects, teen sitcom between 1997 and 2001
- Des Renford MBE (1927–1999), Australian long-distance swimmer

== See also ==
- Brentford
- Enford
- Trent Ford
