= Lawrenceville Street Historic District =

Historic district in Georgia, United States

- U.S. National Register of Historic Places
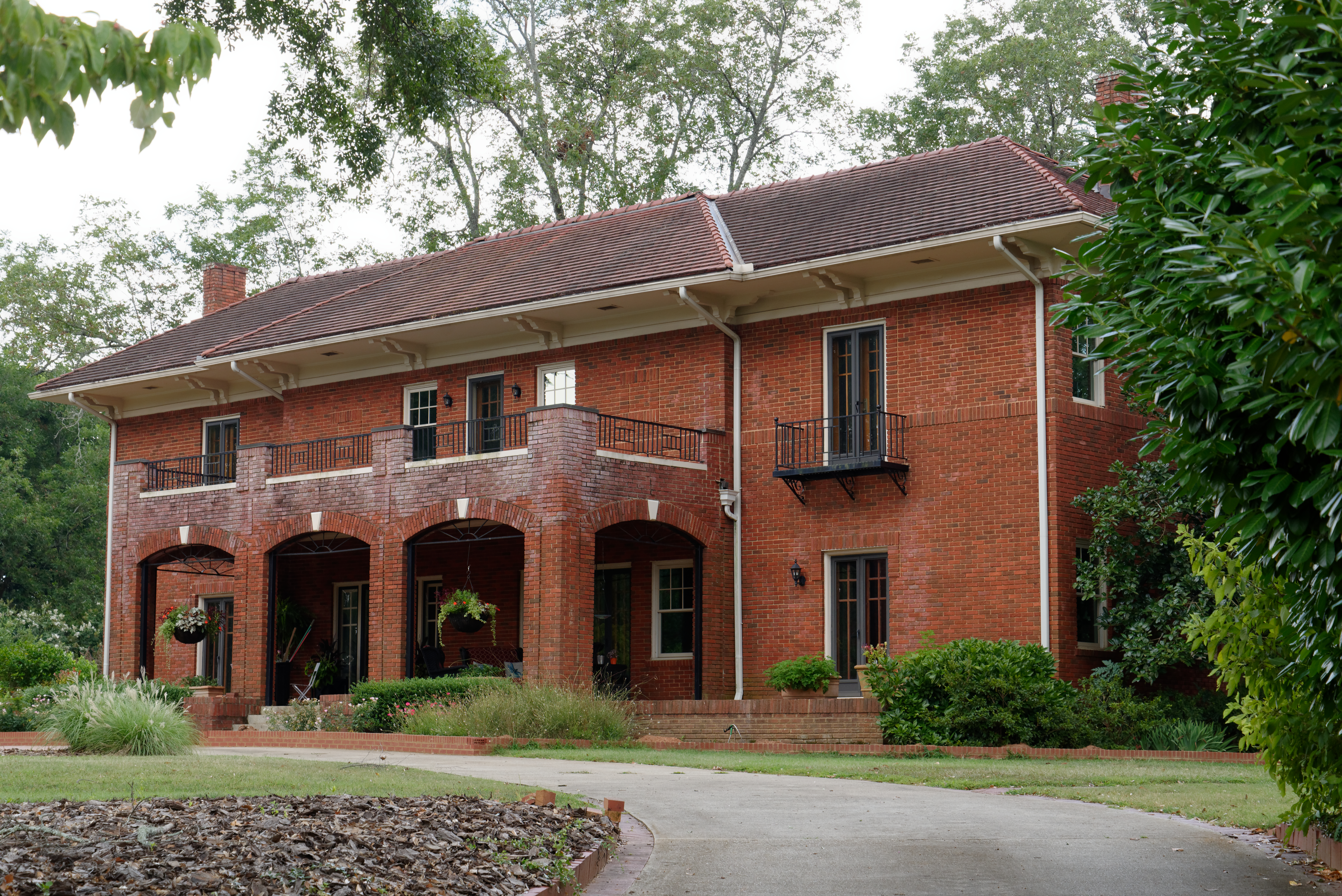
- This is the 1916 Turner House

- Location within Georgia
- Location: Lawrenceville St. roughly between the Henry County Courthouse square and GA 20, McDonough, Georgia
- Coordinates: 33°27′00″N 84°08′42″W
- Area: 25 acres (10 ha)
- Built: 1823
- Architect: F.P. Heifner, F.P.
- Architectural style: Queen Anne, Colonial Revival
- NRHP reference No.: 09000054
- Added to NRHP: February 20, 2009

The Lawrenceville Street Historic District, in McDonough, Georgia, is a 25 acres (10 ha) historic district which was listed on the National Register of Historic Places in 2009. It included 27 contributing buildings and a contributing structure.

It consists of houses along a street which arcs northeast and east from the Henry County Courthouse. These include:

- House at 34 Lawrenceville Street (c.1900), a New South cottage with "the complex massing of a Queen Anne cottage and a central hall"
- C.W. Walker House (1888), 56 Lawrenceville Street, a two-story, three-bay Georgian
- House at 61 Lawrenceville Street (c.1890), a central-hall plan house with a Greek Revival-style porch and a steeply pitched Gothic Revival-style cross-gable roof
- House at 97 Lawrenceville Street (1904), "an excellent example of a Georgian-plan cottage"
- House at 215 Lawrenceville Street (1916), Renaissance Revival-style This is the Turner House, pictured above.

However, as of 2019, the first three of these have been demolished.
