= Antonio Gibson =

American football player (born 1998)

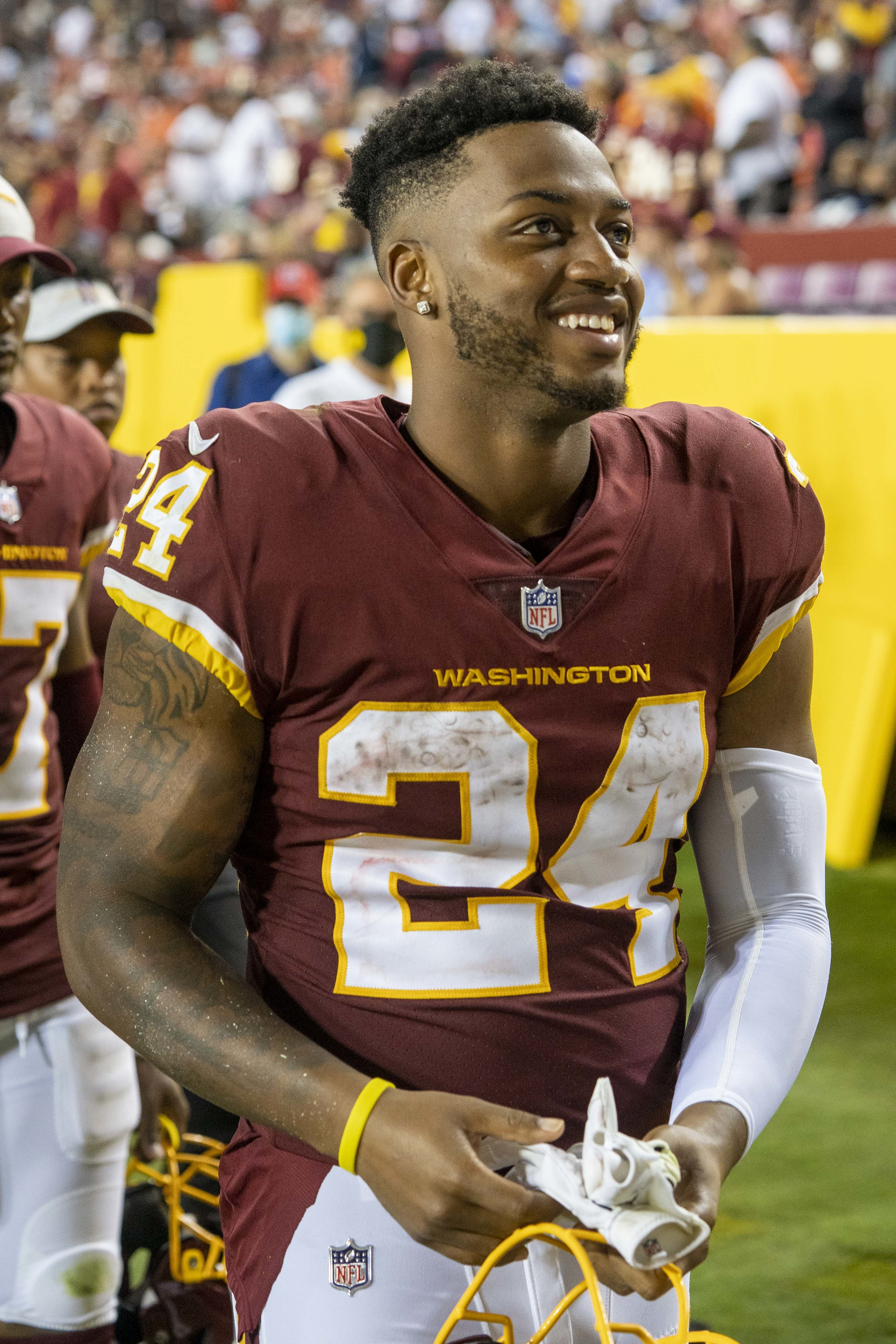
- Gibson with the Washington Football Team in 2021

Profile
- Positions: Running back, kickoff returner

Personal information
- Born: June 23, 1998 (age 28); Stockbridge, Georgia, U.S.
- Listed height: 6 ft 0 in (1.83 m)
- Listed weight: 228 lb (103 kg)

Career information
- High school: Eagle's Landing (McDonough, Georgia)
- College: East Central CC (2016–2017); Memphis (2018–2019)
- NFL draft: 2020: 3rd round, 66th overall pick

Career history
- Washington Football Team / Commanders (2020–2023); New England Patriots (2024–2025)

Awards and highlights
- AAC Co-Special Teams Player of the Year (2019); First-team All-AAC (2019, return specialist); Second-team All-AAC (2019, wide receiver); American Athletic Conference Football Championship Game MVP (2019)

Career NFL statistics as of 2025
- Rushing yards: 3,287
- Rushing average: 4.2
- Rushing touchdowns: 24
- Receptions: 197
- Receiving yards: 1,495
- Receiving touchdowns: 7
- Return yards: 1,407
- Return touchdowns: 1
- Stats at Pro Football Reference

Antonio Gibson (born June 23, 1998) is an American professional football running back and kickoff returner. He played college football at East Central Community College in Mississippi for two years prior to transferring to Memphis in 2018. As a return specialist and wide receiver with Memphis, Gibson was named American Athletic Conference (AAC) special teams player of the year in 2019 and received conference honors for both positions. He entered the 2020 NFL draft as a running back, where he was selected by the Washington Football Team in the third round and played four seasons.

== Early life ==
Gibson attended Eagle's Landing High School in McDonough, Georgia, playing for their football, basketball, and track teams. As a senior, he was named the Henry Daily Herald's offensive player of the year.

== College career ==
Gibson enrolled at East Central Community College in 2016, playing football for them prior to transferring to the University of Memphis in 2018. In his two years at East Central, he had 50 receptions for 871 receiving yards with 13 touchdowns, 27 kick returns, 554 kick-return yards and 249 rushing yards. He played wide receiver and running back at Memphis.

In his two years, he had 44 receptions for 834 yards with 10 touchdowns, 369 rushing yards and four touchdowns and 647 return yards and a touchdown. In 2019, he was named the American Athletic Conference (AAC) Special Teams Player of the Year and made first-team all-AAC as a return specialist and second-team as a wide receiver, becoming only the fourth player in conference history to receive such an honor at two positions. He was invited to the 2020 Senior Bowl as a running back, where he recorded 68 rushing yards on 11 carries.

== Professional career ==
Pre-draft measurables
Height	Weight	Arm length	Hand span	Wingspan	40-yard dash	10-yard split	20-yard split	Vertical jump	Broad jump	Bench press
6 ft 0 3/8 in (1.84 m)	228 lb (103 kg)	31 1/8 in (0.79 m)	8 5/8 in (0.22 m)	6 ft 3 1/2 in (1.92 m)	4.39 s	1.51 s	2.57 s	35.0 in (0.89 m)	9 ft 10 in (3.00 m)	16 reps
All values from NFL Combine

=== Washington Football Team / Commanders ===
==== 2020 ====
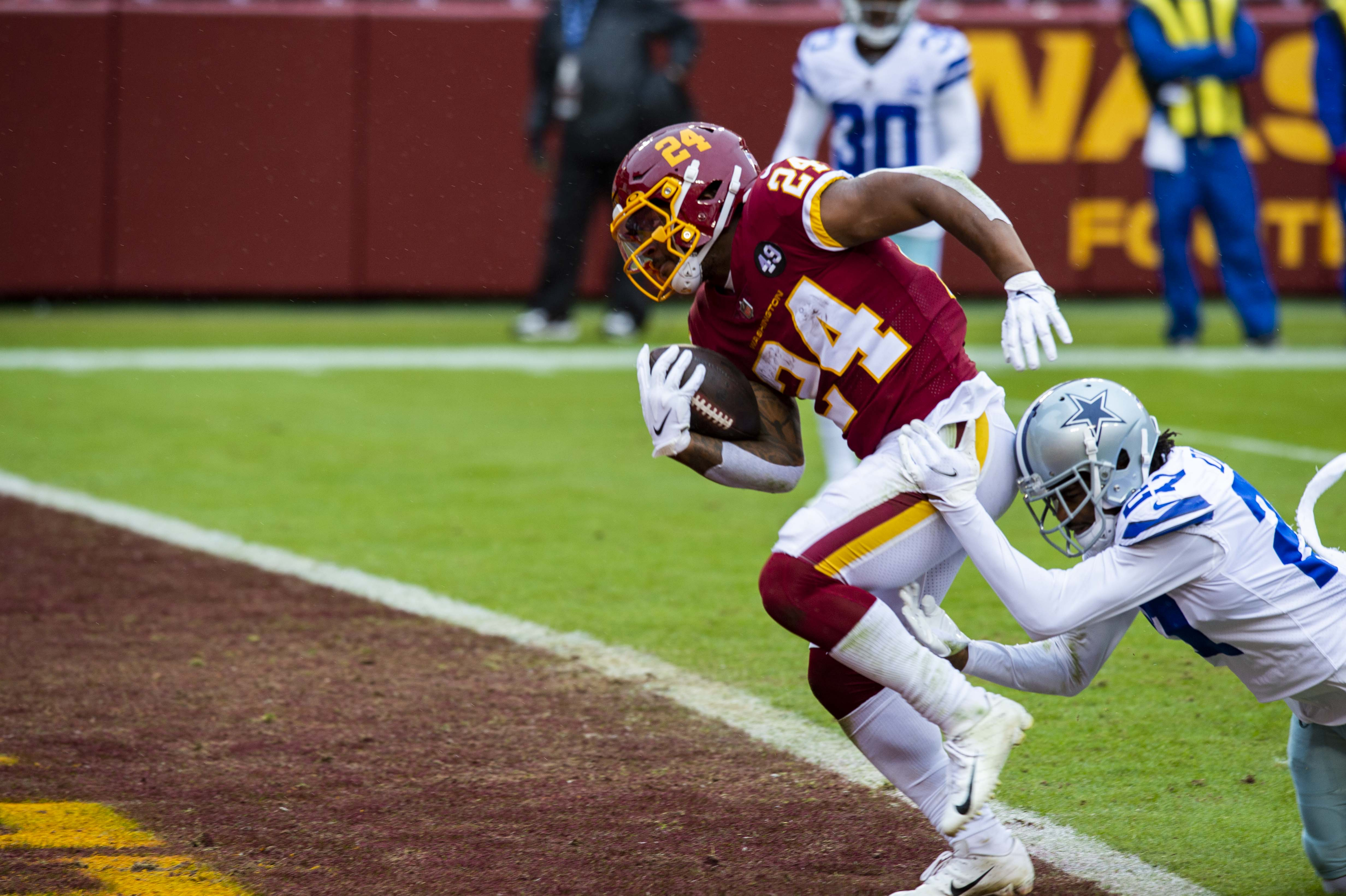
Gibson scoring a touchdown against the Dallas Cowboys in 2020

Gibson entered the 2020 NFL draft as a running back prospect, where he was selected by the Washington Redskins in the third round (66th overall). Team executives cited his ability to play various positions as a major reason why they drafted him. He signed his four-year rookie contract on July 22, 2020.

He scored his first career touchdown, an 11-yard run, in Week 2 against the Arizona Cardinals. In Week 4 against the Baltimore Ravens, Gibson recorded 128 total yards from scrimmage along with a rushing touchdown. He recorded his first career 100-yard rushing game in Week 7 against the Dallas Cowboys, rushing 20 times for 128 yards and a touchdown.

In a rematch against the Cowboys on Thanksgiving, Gibson rushed for 115 yards and three touchdowns during a 41–16 victory. He was the first rookie to score three touchdowns on Thanksgiving since Randy Moss in 1998, and the first running back on the same day to rush for over 100 yards with three touchdowns since Barry Sanders in 1997. He was also named the Pepsi NFL Rookie of the Week for his performance. The following week against the Pittsburgh Steelers, he suffered a turf toe injury early in the first quarter and subsequently missed the rest of that game and the next one against the San Francisco 49ers. Gibson finished the 2020 season with 170 carries for 795 yards while leading all rookies in rushing touchdowns with 11, and was also the first Washington rookie to record 1,000 yards from scrimmage since Alfred Morris in 2012.

==== 2021 ====
In Week 3 of the 2021 season, Gibson recorded a 73–yard touchdown reception against the Buffalo Bills. The play was the second-longest touchdown reception by a Washington running back in franchise history. The next week, he recorded 63 yards and one touchdown in the win over the Atlanta Falcons, which brought him over 1,000 career rushing yards. This made Gibson the third Washington player in the franchise's history to attain 1,000 rushing yards within his first two seasons since running back Alfred Morris and quarterback Robert Griffin III. On Monday Night Football against the Seattle Seahawks, he recorded 111 yards over 29 carries in the Week 12 win which was his first 100-plus rushing yard game of the season. On December 31, 2021, he was placed on the team's COVID-19 reserve list and was forced to sit out of the Week 17 game against the Philadelphia Eagles. He finished the 2021 season with 258 carries for 1,037 yards and seven touchdowns to go with 42 receptions for 294 yards and three touchdowns. He was placed back on active roster on January 5, 2022.

==== 2022 ====
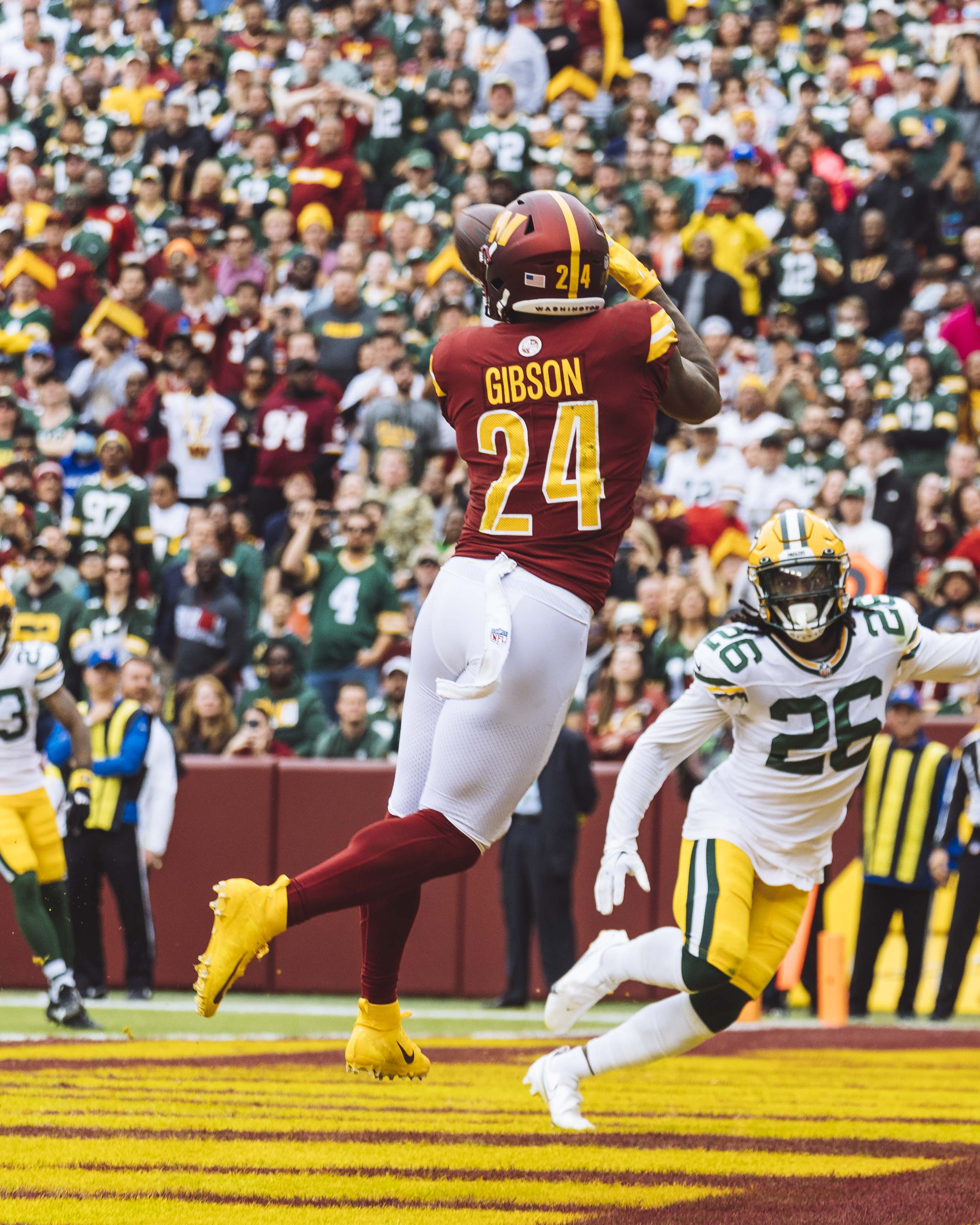
Gibson catching a touchdown against the Green Bay Packers in 2022

In the 2022 preseason, Gibson was announced as the team's new kick returner while losing his starting position to rookie running back Brian Robinson Jr. Following Robinson Jr. being shot in an armed robbery, Gibson returned as the team's starting running back in the beginning of the 2022 season. In the Week 7 win over the Green Bay Packers, Gibson recorded 59 rushing yards, three receptions, 18 receiving yards, and one receiving touchdown. The touchdown was the franchise's 3,000 in their history, with the ball being displayed in the Pro Football Hall of Fame. On January 5, 2023, he was placed on injured reserve. He finished the season with 546 rushing yards and three touchdowns, along with 46 catches for 353 yards and two touchdowns.

==== 2023 ====
In the 2023 season, Gibson had 65 carries for 265 rushing yards and one rushing touchdown to go with 48 receptions for 389 receiving yards and two receiving touchdowns.

=== New England Patriots ===
==== 2024 ====
On March 14, 2024, Gibson signed a three-year contract with the New England Patriots. He finished the 2024 season with 120 carries for 538 rushing yards and one rushing touchdown to go with 23 receptions for 206 receiving yards.

==== 2025 ====
In Week 2 of the 2025 season, Gibson was named AFC Special Teams Player of the Week after scoring a 90-yard touchdown on a kickoff return against the Miami Dolphins. In Week 5 against the Buffalo Bills, Gibson exited the game with a knee injury, later determined to be a torn ACL, ruling him out of the rest of the season. On October 10, 2025, he was placed on injured reserve. He finished the 2025 season with 25 carries for 106 yards and a touchdown in five games. He was released on February 23, 2026.

=== NFL career statistics ===
Regular season
Year	Team	Games		Rushing					Receiving					Kick returns					Fumbles	
Year	Team	GP	GS	Att	Yds	Avg	Lng	TD	Rec	Yds	Avg	Lng	TD	Ret	Yds	Avg	Lng	TD	Fum	Lost
2020	WAS	14	10	170	795	4.7	40	11	36	247	6.9	40	0	-	-	-	-	-	2	2
2021	WAS	16	16	258	1,037	4.0	27	7	42	294	7.0	73	3	-	-	-	-	-	6	4
2022	WAS	15	6	149	546	3.7	20	3	46	353	7.7	18	2	21	485	23.1	45	0	1	0
2023	WAS	16	2	65	265	4.1	16	1	48	389	8.1	41	2	14	340	24.3	37	0	3	2
2024	NE	17	3	120	538	4.5	45	1	23	206	9.0	50	0	9	239	26.6	42	0	0	0
2025	NE	5	0	25	106	4.2	21	1	2	6	3.0	5	0	12	342	28.5	90	1	0	0
Career		83	35	787	3,287	4.2	45	24	197	1,495	7.6	73	7	56	1,407	25.1	90	1	12	8
Playoffs
2020	WAS	1	1	14	31	2.2	11	0	2	4	2.0	3	0	-	-	-	-	-	0	0
Career		1	1	14	31	2.2	11	0	2	4	2.0	3	0						0	0
