= Eagle's Landing High School =

Public high school in McDonough, Georgia, United States

Location
- 301 Tunis Road; McDonough, Georgia 30253; United States; 33°33′51″N 84°12′10″W

Information
- Type: Public
- Motto: "Educating Each for the Benefit of All"
- Established: 1990
- Superintendent: Dr. John Pace, III
- Principal: Chere' Lewis
- Faculty: 84
- Teaching staff: 76.90 (FTE)
- Enrollment: 1,578 (2024–2025)
- Student to teacher ratio: 20.52
- Campus: Suburbs
- Color: Blue Gold
- Mascot: Golden Eagle
- Website: https://elh.henry.k12.ga.us/

Eagle's Landing High School is a high school located in McDonough, Georgia, United States. It is operated by the Henry County School System. Eagle's Landing was founded in 1990. Today, the school has 1,382 students enrolled in grades 9-12 and is accredited by the Southern Association of Colleges and Schools. The school is home to an active NJROTC program, a nationally acclaimed band, and varsity sports teams that compete in the AAAA, region 4 of the Georgia High School Association.

== Athletics ==
- JV/varsity Golden Eagles football
- JV/varsity Golden Eagles basketball
- JV/varsity Lady Eagles basketball
- Lady Eagles volleyball
- Cross country
- Track
- Lady Eagles softball
- JV/varsity Golden Eagles baseball
- JV/varsity Golden Eagles soccer
- JV/varsity Eagles Landing Girls Lacrosse

== Notable alumni ==
- Antonio Gibson - professional football player
- Matt Murton - former professional baseball player
- J.R. Pinnock - former professional basketball player
