= Creekside Christian Academy =

Christian school in McDonough, Georgia, United States

Location
- 175 Foster Drive McDonough Georgia 30253 (East Campus); 2455 Mt. Carmel Rd. Hampton Georgia, 30228 (West Campus)
- 33.468490°N 84.210100°W

Information
- School type: Private Christian
- Religious affiliation: Christian (non-denominational)
- Established: 1973
- Headmaster: Rodney Clark
- Grades: K3-12
- Colors: Blue, Gold, and White
- Athletics conference: ACSI
- Mascot: Claw the Cougar
- Nickname: Cougars
- Website: creeksidechristian.academy

Creekside Christian Academy is a private non-denominational Christian school located in McDonough, Georgia. It conducts classes for preschool as well as elementary, middle school, and high school grades.

In January 2018, Creekside moved its high school students to a new campus known as the West Campus, making the school a dual campus academy. The West Campus located at 2455 Mt. Carmel Rd. in Hampton Georgia, was the home of Higher Living Christian Church prior to the church's foreclosure. The middle school students of CCA made the move into the West Campus in the Fall of 2018. The elementary and preschool portion of the school with remain at the East Campus (175 Foster Drive Mcdonough Georgia,) until the end of the 2025/26 school year, when the elementary students will be moved to Liberty Hill Baptist Church in Hampton. Creekside used to be Clayton Christian School and moved into the East Campus in 2007.

Rodney (Rocky) Clark became the school's headmaster in early 2020.
