= J. R. Pinnock =

American-Panamanian basketball player (born 1983)

Personal information
- Born: December 11, 1983 (age 42) Fort Hood, Texas, U.S.
- Listed height: 6 ft 4 in (1.93 m)
- Listed weight: 204 lb (93 kg)

Career information
- High school: Coastal Christian Academy (Virginia Beach, Virginia); Eagle's Landing (McDonough, Georgia)
- College: George Washington (2003–2006)
- NBA draft: 2006: 2nd round, 58th overall pick
- Drafted by: Dallas Mavericks
- Playing career: 2006–2017
- Position: Shooting guard
- Stats at Basketball Reference
Medals
Men's basketball
Representing Panama
Centrobasket
Bronze medal – third place	2010 Santo Domingo

Danilo Agustin "J. R." Pinnock (born December 11, 1983) is an American-Panamanian former professional basketball player. His parents are natives of Panama.

Born in Fort Hood, Texas, Pinnock attended Coastal Christian Academy in Virginia Beach, Virginia, and Eagle's Landing High School in McDonough, Georgia.

Pinnock went on to attend George Washington University, where he was the team's leading scorer in the 2005–06 season, and helped lead them to two consecutive NCAA tournaments. He is a native of McDonough, Georgia. After college, he played in Greece's top professional basketball league the Greek league with Colossus Rhodes BC.

Pinnock was an early entry candidate who was selected by the Dallas Mavericks in the second round of the 2006 NBA draft, 58th overall and then was later traded to the Los Angeles Lakers for whom he would appear in seven pre-season games. Pinnock was cut from the Lakers along with other Laker hopeful Von Wafer. He played some games in Germany for the Giessen 46ers, but was released by the club and returned to the United States, playing in the D-League, the NBA's minor league, for the Arkansas RimRockers. In September 2007, he was taken first overall in the D-League Expansion Draft by the Rio Grande Valley Vipers.

Pinnock played in BSN (Baloncesto Superior Nacional), Puerto Rico's professional basketball league, where he won his first professional championship with the Capitanes de Arecibo in 2010. Danilo Pinnock won the championship again in 2011 when Capitanes de Arecibo repeated as champions. Pinnock was released from Arecibo in March 2014.

== Career statistics ==
=== Domestic leagues ===
Season	Team	League	GP	MPG	FG%	3P%	FT%	RPG	APG	SPG	BPG	PPG
2006–07	Gießen 46ers	German BBL	8	32.0	.378	.333	.613	5.6	2.3	1.0	.8	15.0
2006–07	Arkansas RimRockers	D-League	21	31.0	.536	.188	.773	6.8	4.6	1.4	.6	11.0
2007	Toros de Chorrillo	Panama CBS League	no stats available									
2007–08	Kolossos	GBL	26	32.8	.545	.225	.684	5.0	1.7	2.0	.7	15.0
2008	Marinos de Anzoátegui	Venezuela LPB	no stats available									
2008–09	Seven 2007 Roseto	Legadue	20	33.6	.484	.276	.780	4.8	2.3	3.3	.6	16.3
2008–09	Libertad Sunchales	Argentina LNB	31	30.2	.541	.327	.750	4.8	1.1	2.9	.1	17.7
2009	Capitanes de Arecibo	BSN	24	31.1	.474	.385	.844	7.0	3.0	1.5	.7	15.7
2009–10	Barak Netanya	ISBL	27	35.6	.544	.263	.806	4.9	3.2	2.3	.4	19.1
2010	Capitanes de Arecibo	BSN	9	35.7	.531	.343	.742	7.1	2.2	1.1	.8	16.1
2010–11	Titanes del Distrito Nacional	Dominican LNB	no stats available									
2011	Capitanes de Arecibo	BSN	44	29.8	.502	.321	.707	6.6	2.6	1.2	.5	15.1
2011–12	Habik'a	ISBL	5	33.4	.400	.290	.800	6.6	2.4	2.8	.4	14.2
2012	Capitanes de Arecibo	BSN	50	28.8	.491	.328	.786	6.1	3.8	1.5	.5	14.5
2012–13	Halcones Rojos Veracruz	Mexico LNPB	32	28.4	.505	.385	.750	4.7	2.0	1.1	.4	13.1
2013	Indios de Mayagüez	BSN	43	31.2	.466	.295	.714	6.5	2.3	1.4	.6	12.6
2014	Atléticos de San Germán	BSN	6	28.3	.424	.130	.875	4.7	1.8	1.3	1.0	7.3
2015	Bucaneros de La Guaira	Venezuela LPB	5	23.3	.520	.182	.846	5.2	1.8	.6	.0	8.6
2015	Piratas de Quebradillas	BSN	10	36.8	.477	.189	.914	5.8	3.3	1.9	.7	13.7
2015	Huracanes del Atlántico	Dominican LNB	4	33.3	.478	.393	.750	5.3	3.0	1.3	.5	16.0
