= D. J. White (American football) =

American football player (born 1993)

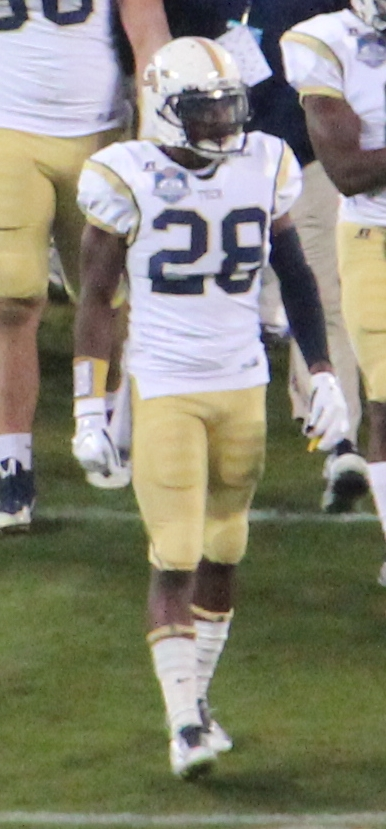
- White with the Georgia Tech Yellow Jackets in 2014

No. 24, 37, 39
- Position: Cornerback

Personal information
- Born: September 9, 1993 (age 33); Atlanta, Georgia, U.S.
- Listed height: 5 ft 11 in (1.80 m)
- Listed weight: 193 lb (88 kg)

Career information
- High school: Union Grove (McDonough, Georgia)
- College: Georgia Tech
- NFL draft: 2016: 6th round, 178th overall pick

Career history
- Kansas City Chiefs (2016–2017); Indianapolis Colts (2017–2018); Washington Redskins (2019)*; Philadelphia Eagles (2019)*; Atlanta Falcons (2019); Dallas Cowboys (2019–2020)*; Atlanta Falcons (2020)*; Las Vegas Raiders (2020)*
- * Offseason or practice squad member only

Career NFL statistics
- Total tackles: 14
- Pass deflections: 3
- Interceptions: 1
- Stats at Pro Football Reference

David Jamaal White (born September 9, 1993) is an American former professional football player who was a cornerback in the National Football League (NFL). He played college football for the Georgia Tech Yellow Jackets, and was selected by the Kansas City Chiefs in the sixth round of the 2016 NFL draft.

== Early life ==
White was born in Atlanta, Georgia, to Brockston and Zina White. He began to play football in the 6th grade. He attended Union Grove High School and played for head coach Paul Borgdorf. In high school he played cornerback and wide receiver where he made the All-Region team and was an honorable mention for All-State. He wore number 9 on his jersey in school because it represented his birth month and day.

White was considered a three star prospect by Rivals.com[, the 34th best in the country at his position. He received a number of offers to play Division I football including those from Georgia Tech, Auburn, California, and Illinois. He ultimately committed to Georgia Tech following his visit to the school on December 9, 2012.

== College career ==
White chose to major in business administration, and after not receiving a redshirt designation by the Yellow Jackets, played in the last 10 games of the season and forced a fumble in conference play against North Carolina. He followed up his efforts in his sophomore year by playing in every game that season, and starting at defensive back for nine of them. During the Music City Bowl against Ole Miss, White recorded the first interception of his college career in the fourth quarter.

He continued to improve in his junior year as he started every game of the season. During the game against the Virginia Tech Hokies, he recorded his second interception and set up what was ultimately the game-winning drive. A week later, he stopped a 75-yard run by forcing a fumble out of the back of the end zone against the Pittsburgh Panthers that went for a touchback. On November 8, 2014, White had his first career touchdown against North Carolina State when he intercepted a pass by Jacoby Brissett by stepping in front of his wide receiver and running it back 48 yards for the touchdown. He finished the season with four interceptions, leading the team. In addition he also led the team in pass break-ups with eight, and also registered one forced fumble. His efforts resulted in him being named an All-Atlantic Coast Conference honorable mention by the media.

In his final year with the Yellow Jackets, White started 11 games. He started out the season recording five tackles and five pass break-ups against Virginia Tech. He went on to force a fumble against North Carolina a month later. He finished the year leading the team in pass break-ups, and two interceptions.

== Professional career ==
=== Pre-draft ===
Pre-draft measurables
Height	Weight	Arm length	Hand span	Wingspan	40-yard dash	10-yard split	20-yard split	20-yard shuttle	Three-cone drill	Vertical jump	Broad jump	Bench press
5 ft 10 7/8 in (1.80 m)	193 lb (88 kg)	31 1/2 in (0.80 m)	9 1/4 in (0.23 m)	6 ft 4 7/8 in (1.95 m)	4.49 s	1.61 s	2.64 s	4.33 s	7.18 s	34.0 in (0.86 m)	11 ft 0 in (3.35 m)	17 reps
All values from NFL Combine/Pro Day

White's play in college earned him an invitation to the NFL Scouting Combine. Lance Zierlein of NFL.com praised him for his patience in coverage and his ability to displace receivers with his jam technique. He also complimented his ability to break on the ball with his short quickness, and noted that he had forced at least one fumble every year he was at Georgia Tech. But Zierlein criticized his "very" average recovery speed and his inability to efficiently exercise proper technique in coverage, specifically the fact that he could not turn around fast enough or "flip his hips" quickly. He projected White to be a third round pick.

=== Kansas City Chiefs ===
White was selected by the Kansas City Chiefs in the sixth round, 178th overall, of the 2016 NFL draft.

On November 4, 2017, White was waived by the Chiefs.

=== Indianapolis Colts ===
Two days after the Chiefs waived him, White was claimed off waivers by the Indianapolis Colts. On September 1, 2018, White was waived by the Colts and was signed to the practice squad the next day, only to be released two days later.

=== Washington Redskins ===
White signed with the Washington Redskins on August 2, 2019. He was waived on August 31, 2019.

=== Philadelphia Eagles ===
White was signed to the Philadelphia Eagles' practice squad on September 30, 2019.

=== Atlanta Falcons (first stint) ===
On October 8, 2019, White was signed by the Atlanta Falcons off the Eagles practice squad. He was waived on October 28.

=== Dallas Cowboys ===
On October 31, 2019, White was signed to the Dallas Cowboys practice squad. On December 30, 2019, White was signed to a reserve/future contract. On April 30, 2020, he was waived by the Cowboys.

=== Atlanta Falcons (second stint) ===
On September 23, 2020, White was signed to the Falcons practice squad. He was released on September 29, 2020.

=== Las Vegas Raiders ===
On October 13, 2020, White was signed to the Las Vegas Raiders' practice squad. He was placed on the practice squad/injured list on October 27. He was released with an injury settlement on October 29.
