= Dalvin Tomlinson =

American football player (born 1994)

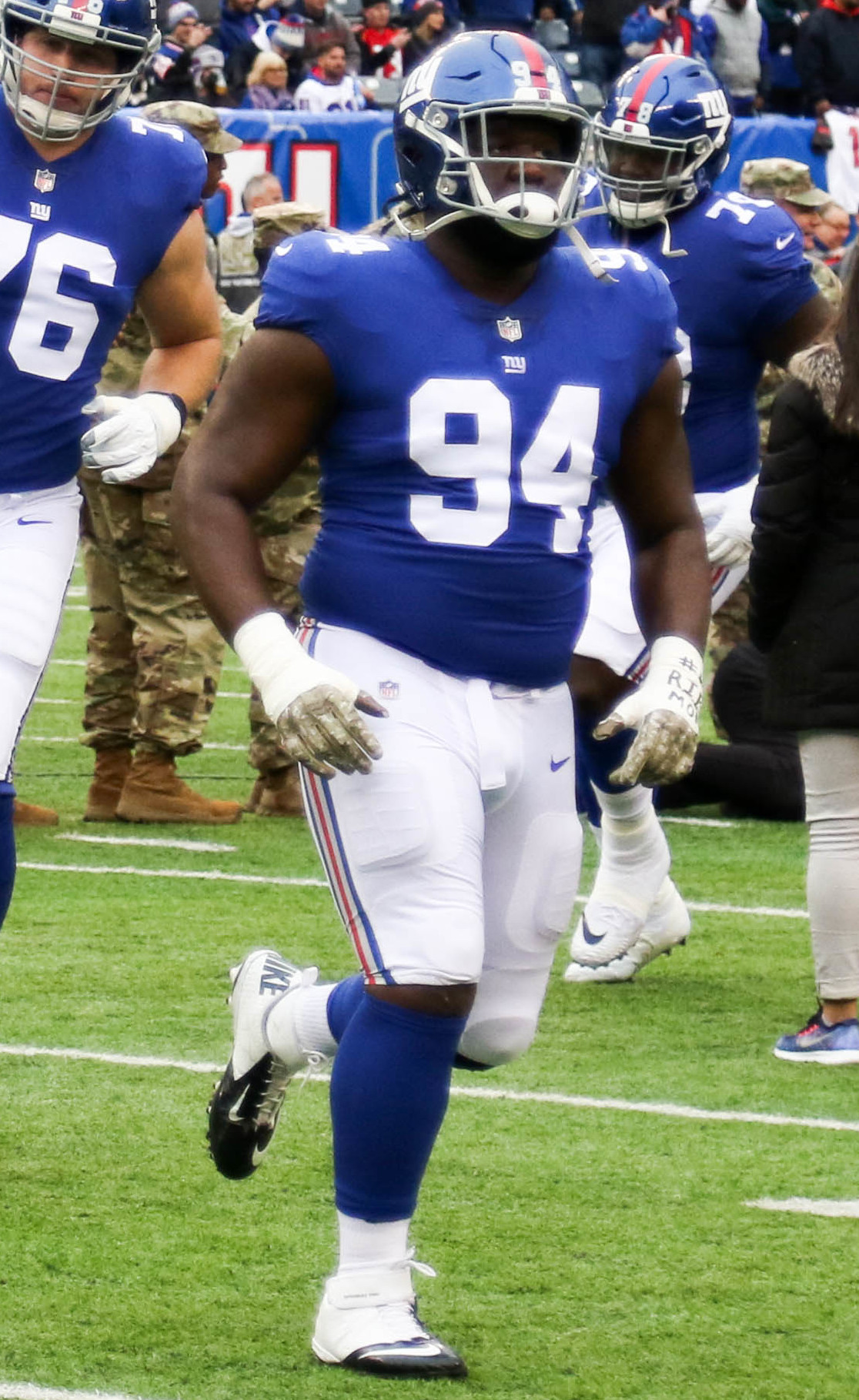
- Tomlinson with the New York Giants in 2018

No. 94 – Los Angeles Chargers
- Position: Nose tackle
- Roster status: Active

Personal information
- Born: February 28, 1994 (age 32); McDonough, Georgia, U.S.
- Listed height: 6 ft 3 in (1.91 m)
- Listed weight: 317 lb (144 kg)

Career information
- High school: Henry County (McDonough)
- College: Alabama (2012–2016)
- NFL draft: 2017: 2nd round, 55th overall pick

Career history
- New York Giants (2017–2020); Minnesota Vikings (2021–2022); Cleveland Browns (2023–2024); Arizona Cardinals (2025); Los Angeles Chargers (2026–present)

Awards and highlights
- PFWA All-Rookie Team (2017); CFP national champion (2015); BCS national champion (2012)

Career NFL statistics as of Week 5, 2026
- Total tackles: 376
- Sacks: 20.5
- Forced fumbles: 2
- Fumble recoveries: 2
- Pass deflections: 8
- Stats at Pro Football Reference

Dalvin Tomlinson (born February 28, 1994) is an American professional football nose tackle for the Los Angeles Chargers of the National Football League (NFL). He played college football for the Alabama Crimson Tide. He was selected by the New York Giants in the second round of the 2017 NFL draft, and played for the team from 2017 to 2020.

== Early life ==
Tomlinson attended Henry County High School in McDonough, Georgia. He played football and was a wrestler in high school, winning three state titles.

== College career ==
Tomlinson began attending Alabama in 2012 and redshirted his first season while still recovering from a torn ACL he suffered playing for his soccer team in high school.

Throughout Alabama's fall camp in 2013, Tomlinson competed with Ed Stinson, Jeoffrey Pagan, and A'Shawn Robinson for the starting defensive end position. Head coach Nick Saban named him the backup right defensive end behind Jeoffrey Pagan to begin his freshman season. On August 31, 2013, Tomlinson made his collegiate debut during Alabama's 35–10 victory over Virginia Tech. He recorded four combined tackles, but left after suffering a knee injury that caused him to miss the entire 2013 season. He had a surgery to repair the knee injury and was due to miss 5–6 months.

He returned to fall camp in 2014 and competed with Jonathan Allen and D. J. Pettway for the job as the starting defensive end. On August 30, 2014, Tomlinson recorded five combined tackles during Alabama's season-opening 33–23 victory over West Virginia. On October 25, 2014, he recorded two solo tackles and sacked Tennessee's quarterback Joshua Dobbs for the first one of his career during a 34–20 victory. On November 15, 2014, he recorded a season-high seven combined tackles, two tackles Mississippi, and made the second sack of his career, as Alabama defeated Mississippi State. He finished his sophomore season in 2014 with 22 combined tackles (8 solo), two sacks, and 5.5 tackles for a loss in 14 games.

Tomlinson returned to fall camp in 2015, competing for the starting defensive end position with A'Shawn Robinson, Jarran Reed, Jonathan Allen, and Da'Shawn Hand. He was named the backup right defensive end behind Jarran Reed to begin his third season. In Alabama's season-opener against Wisconsin, Tomlinson made two solo tackles and a career-high three pass deflections during Alabama's 35–17 victory. On September 26, 2015, Tomlinson recorded a season-high five combined tackles in a 35–0 defeat over Louisiana-Monroe. During a Week 8 contest against LSU, he collected four combined tackles and was credited for half a sack on Brandon Harris in a 30–16 victory. Tomlinson completed the 2015 season with 34 combined tackles (22 solo), a half a sack, and led the Crimson Tide with five pass deflections in 14 games. He was a part of a highly touted defensive front in 2015, that consisted of four future NFL players that would all be taken in the first two rounds of the 2016 and 2017 NFL draft. Along with him and nose tackle Daron Payne, the defensive line included A'Shawn Robinson (46th overall, 2016), Jarran Reed (49th overall, 2016), and Jonathan Allen (17th overall, 2017).

In 2016, Tomlinson competed with Jonathan Allen, Dakota Ball, and Da'Shawn Hand for the vacant defensive end positions throughout fall camp. Head coach Nick Saban named him the right defensive end opposite Jonathan Allen, to begin the 2016 season. He made his first career start during Alabama's season-opener against USC and helped hold the Trojans to 64 rushing yards and recorded one tackle during the 52–6 victory. He played both defensive tackle and defensive end throughout the game. The following week against Western Kentucky, he recorded three combined tackles, a tackle for a loss, and his first sack of the season, as the Crimson Tide defeated the Hilltoppers 38–10. On November 19, 2016, Tomlinson collected a career-high eight combined tackle and was credited with an assist for a tackle for a loss during a 31–3 win against Chattanooga. He finished his senior season a total of 62 combined tackles (45 solo), 5.5 tackles for a loss, three sacks, and a forced fumble in 14 games and 14 starts.

During his career, he had 122 tackles and four sacks.

== Professional career ==
=== Pre-draft ===
Tomlinson received an invitation to the Senior Bowl and helped the South defeat the North 16–15 with four combined tackles. The Cleveland Browns, Houston Texans, Philadelphia Eagles, and San Diego Chargers all met and interviewed Tomlinson during the week of the Senior Bowl. He attended the NFL Combine and performed all of the combine and positional drills except for the bench. He also participated at Alabama's Pro Day and opted to only run positional drills and perform the bench press for scouts and team representatives. The majority of NFL draft experts and analysts projected him to be selected anywhere from the second to fourth round. He was ranked the fifth best defensive tackle in the draft by NFLDraftScout.com and NFL media analyst Mike Mayock, ranked the sixth best defensive tackle by ESPN, and was ranked the ninth best defensive tackle by Sports Illustrated.

Pre-draft measurables
Height	Weight	Arm length	Hand span	Wingspan	40-yard dash	10-yard split	20-yard split	20-yard shuttle	Three-cone drill	Vertical jump	Broad jump	Bench press
6 ft 2 7/8 in (1.90 m)	310 lb (141 kg)	33 1/2 in (0.85 m)	10 1/8 in (0.26 m)	6 ft 10 in (2.08 m)	5.19 s	1.81 s	3.02 s	4.59 s	7.68 s	27.0 in (0.69 m)	9 ft 2 in (2.79 m)	22 reps
All values from NFL Combine/Alabama's Pro Day

=== New York Giants ===
The New York Giants selected Tomlinson in the second round with the 55th overall pick in the 2017 NFL draft.

On May 10, 2017, the New York Giants signed Tomlinson to a four-year, $4.57 Million contract that includes $2.13 million guaranteed and a signing bonus of $1.46 million.

He competed with Robert Thomas, Jay Bromley, Jarron Jones, Jordan Williams, and Corbin Bryant throughout training camp for the role as the starting defensive tackle. Head coach Ben McAdoo named Tomlinson the right defensive tackle, along with Damon Harrison, to begin the regular season.

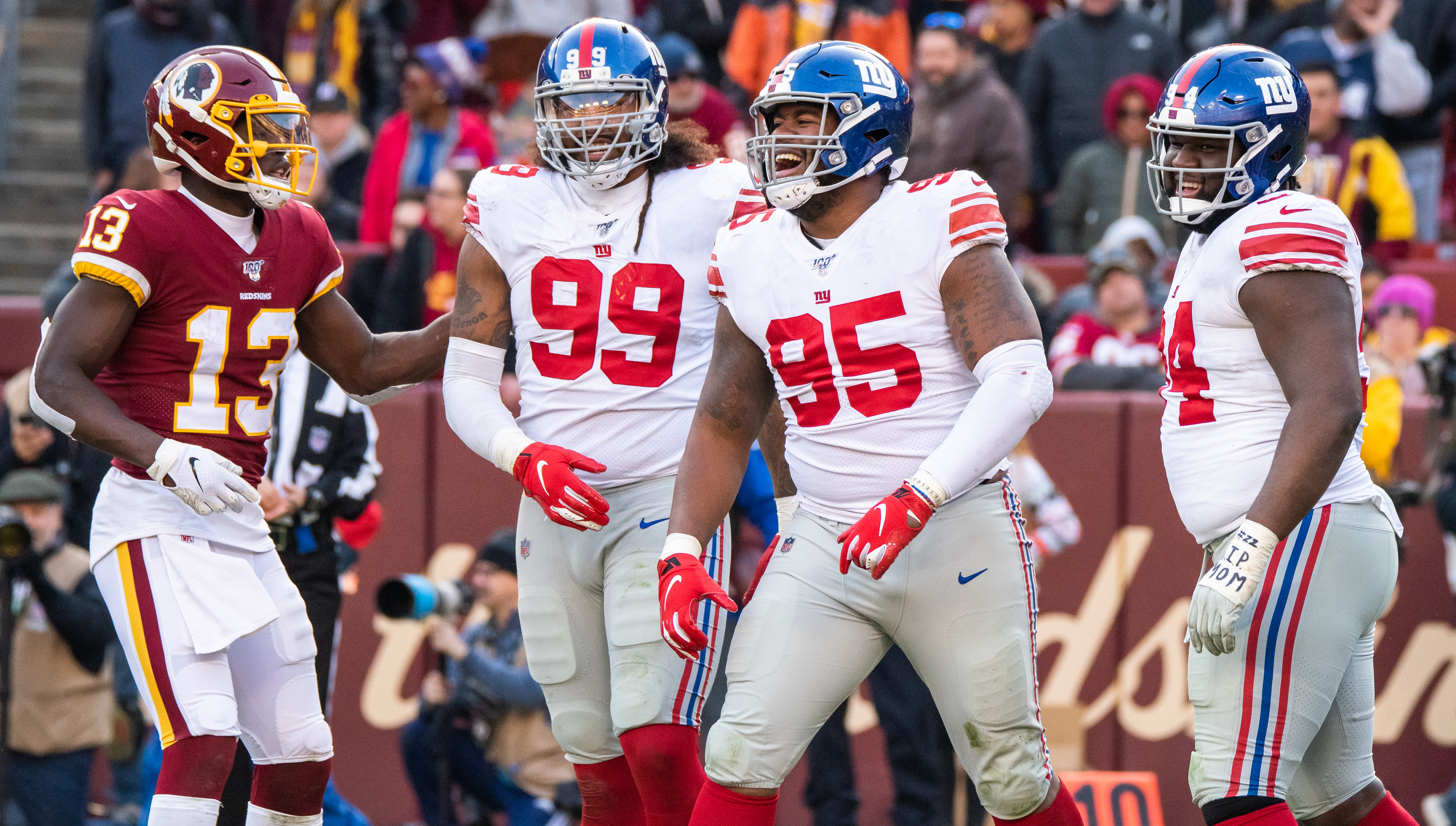
Tomlinson in a game against the Washington Redskins

He made his professional regular season debut during the Giants' season-opener against the Dallas Cowboys and made four combined tackles in the Giant's 3–19 loss. He was named to the PFWA All-Rookie Team.

He originally began the 2018 season at defensive end. After Damon Harrison was traded to the Detroit Lions, Tomlinson was named starting nose tackle.

=== Minnesota Vikings ===
On March 17, 2021, Tomlinson signed a two-year, $22 million contract with the Minnesota Vikings.

=== Cleveland Browns ===
On March 15, 2023, Tomlinson signed a four-year, $57 million contract with the Cleveland Browns. He started 32 games in two years with the Browns, recording six sacks and 54 tackles. Tomlinson was released by Cleveland on March 12, 2025.

=== Arizona Cardinals ===
On March 12, 2025, Tomlinson signed a two-year, $29 million contract with the Arizona Cardinals. He started all 17 games in 2025, recording 26 tackles, one sack, and a pass deflection.

On March 6, 2026, Tomlinson was released by the Cardinals.

=== Los Angeles Chargers ===
On March 16, 2026, Tomlinson signed a one-year, $7.5 million contract with the Los Angeles Chargers.

== NFL career statistics ==
Legend
**Bold**	Career high

=== Regular season ===
Year	Team	Games		Tackles					Interceptions						Fumbles				
Year	Team	GP	GS	Cmb	Solo	Ast	Sck	TFL	Int	Yds	Avg	Lng	TD	PD	FF	Fmb	FR	Yds	TD
2017	NYG	16	16	50	**30**	20	1.0	1	0	0	0.0	0	0	1	0	0	0	0	0
2018	NYG	16	16	**59**	28	**31**	0.0	5	0	0	0.0	0	0	0	0	0	0	0	0
2019	NYG	16	16	49	23	26	**3.5**	7	0	0	0.0	0	0	0	**1**	0	0	0	0
2020	NYG	16	16	49	25	24	**3.5**	**8**	0	0	0.0	0	0	**4**	0	0	0	0	0
2021	MIN	16	16	39	17	22	2.5	2	0	0	0.0	0	0	2	0	0	**1**	0	0
2022	MIN	13	13	42	20	22	2.5	3	0	0	0.0	0	0	0	**1**	0	**1**	0	0
2023	CLE	16	16	28	12	16	3.0	4	0	0	0.0	0	0	0	0	0	0	0	0
2024	CLE	16	16	26	13	13	3.0	6	0	0	0.0	0	0	0	0	0	0	0	0
2025	ARI	17	17	26	13	13	1.0	3	0	0	0.0	0	0	1	0	0	0	0	0
2026	LAC	5	5	8	0	8	0.5	0	0	0	0.0	0	0	0	0	0	0	0	0
Career		147	147	376	181	195	20.5	39	0	0	0.0	0	0	8	2	0	2	0	0

=== Postseason ===
Year	Team	Games		Tackles					Interceptions						Fumbles				
Year	Team	GP	GS	Cmb	Solo	Ast	Sck	TFL	Int	Yds	Avg	Lng	TD	PD	FF	Fmb	FR	Yds	TD
2022	MIN	1	1	**4**	**3**	1	0.0	**1**	0	0	0.0	0	0	0	0	0	0	0	0
2023	CLE	1	1	3	1	**2**	0.0	**1**	0	0	0.0	0	0	0	0	0	0	0	0
Career		2	2	7	4	3	0.0	2	0	0	0.0	0	0	0	0	0	0	0	0
