= McDonough Historic District =

Historic district in Georgia, United States

- U.S. National Register of Historic Places
- U.S. Historic district
- Location: Centered on Griffin St. and Keys Ferry St., McDonough, Georgia
- Coordinates: 33.447°N 84.147333°W
- Area: 200 acres (81 ha)
- Architect: Andrew J. Bryan, others
- Architectural style: Late Victorian, Late 19th and Early 20th Century American Movements
- NRHP reference No.: 07001201
- Added to NRHP: November 19, 2007

The McDonough Historic District, in McDonough, Georgia, is a 200-acre (81 ha) historic district which was listed on the National Register of Historic Places in 2007. It is centered on Griffin St. and Keys Ferry St. and has buildings dating back to 1823. The district includes 187 contributing buildings, one contributing structure, one contributing site, and a contributing object, as well as 71 non-contributing buildings.

The district includes most of historic McDonough, including the separately NRHP-listed Henry County Courthouse and the courthouse square.

Specifically it includes:

Resource	Photo	Dates	Location	Notes
Welcome Center			5 Griffin St. 33.447589°N 84.147433°W	Former gas station which currently houses the McDonough Welcome Center Main Street Program and the McDonough Hospitality and Tourism, Inc. office
Henry County Courthouse		1895-97 built	33.447885°N 84.146659°W	Romanesque Revival courthouse designed by Golucke & Stewart.
Confederate Memorial		1910 built	Courthouse square 33.447355°N 84.146841°W	The statue of Col. Charles T. Zachry on the McDonough Square was taken down July 28, 2020
Brown House			71 Macon St. 33.445646°N 84.146667°W	House expanded in 1883 to current two-story size, then serving as Brown House Hotel
First Baptist Church of McDonough		1903-04 built	101 Macon St; 33.445071°N 84.146698°W	Gothic Revival brick church with bell tower, lancet windows, castellation
Palace Theatre (now Clay Plaza building)		1912	2 Macon St., on courthouse square 33.447556°N 84.146213°W	Built as a one-story brick building in 1912. Served as a movie theater by 1918; expanded in size by 1930
Globe Hotel		1827 built 1985 NRHP-listed	20 Jonesboro St. 33°26′51″N 84°08′53″W	Separately NRHP-listed
Commercial storefronts			18 Macon St. 33.447151°N 84.146251°W	Brick-faced commercial buildings on courthouse square.
