= Union Grove High School =

Public school in Georgia, United States

Location
- 120 E Lake Rd; McDonough, Georgia 30252; United States
- 33.508°N 84.136°W

Information
- Type: Public, coeducational
- Superintendent: Mary Elizabeth Davis
- Principal: LaTonya Richards
- Faculty: 150
- Teaching staff: 85.30 (FTE)
- Enrollment: 1,643 (2023–2024)
- Student to teacher ratio: 19.26
- Campus: Suburbs
- Colors: Maroon, black, white and gray
- Publication: The Prowler
- Mascot: Wolverine
- Website: ugh.henry.k12.ga.us

Union Grove High School is a public institution within the Henry County School System in McDonough, Georgia, United States. It hosts students from ninth through twelfth grades. Current enrollment hovers around 1,532 students.

The school sends its brightest students to the Georgia Governor's Honors Program through a strenuous application and interview process, which welcomes top students from around the state for six weeks of academic enrichment at Berry College. Union Grove usually has the highest number of GHP participants within Henry County. In 2009, Union Grove was listed in the top 5% of American high schools in Newsweek magazine for the fourth year in a row, as #16 in the state, and #482 in the nation.

== History ==
In the late 19th century in the northeastern part of Henry County, a community school named Union Grove Academy opened its doors. In 1904 the Academy's board of directors petitioned the county to accept it as a public school. The school thrived for several decades, but after a disastrous boll weevil invasion and consequent hard times, 25% of the area’s population moved away. In 1945 the school closed. 55 years later Union Grove High School opened its doors in 2000 with a small student body of 801. The fourth high school opened by the Henry County School System in modern times, it chose as its mascot the Wolverine, with school colors of burgundy and silver.

Today Union Grove is home to over 1500 students and over 150 faculty and support staff. Accredited by the Southern Association of Colleges and Schools, the school has had students accepted at 140 different colleges, universities, and technical schools, including Harvard, Vassar, Emory, Stanford, Georgia Tech, and the University of Georgia. It has also had students accepted at West Point and the United States Air Force Academy and the United States Naval Academy. Union Grove was recognized by Newsweek magazine in 2005 for being among the top 10 percent of public schools in the nation. In 2006 Newsweek placed the school among the top 5% of national public schools. In 2005 the school was awarded the Governor's Cup for having a significant increase in SAT scores. Union Grove was recently recognized by the Washington Post as one of America’s Most Challenging High Schools. Union Grove was also recognized in 2015 as a Top AP School. Union Grove High School is the only school in Henry County Schools to be named an AP Merit school by the College Board. Union Grove was also named by the College Board as an AP STEM, AP Humanities, AP STEM Achievement and AP Honors School for the 10th consecutive year in 2016. Additionally, the school traditionally has the largest number of students of all Henry County schools participating in the state Governor’s Honors program. The school regularly beats the state average in the SAT, ACT and all Milestone testing, and is the top school in the county in every area tested, in addition to graduation rates.

In 2015, Ryan Meeks replaced Tom Smith as principal of Union Grove High School.

Union Grove offers students the opportunity to participate in any of 18 sports, including football, basketball, and wrestling. There are also more than 30 co-curricular and extra-curricular clubs available. These include the National Honor Society and National Science Honor Society, as well as areas of student interest such as the Fishing Club. In 2017, the school won the Henry County Directors Cup for the most successful overall sports program for the seventh time in eight years.

== Notable alumni ==
- Jordan Akins (2010) - NFL tight end for the Jacksonville Jaguars; former baseball player in the Texas Rangers organization
- Travis Bergen (2012) - former MLB pitcher
- Megan Betsa (2013) - softball player
- D.J. White (2012) - former NFL cornerback
