= Brown House (McDonough, Georgia) =

- U.S. National Register of Historic Places
- U.S. Historic district – Contributing property
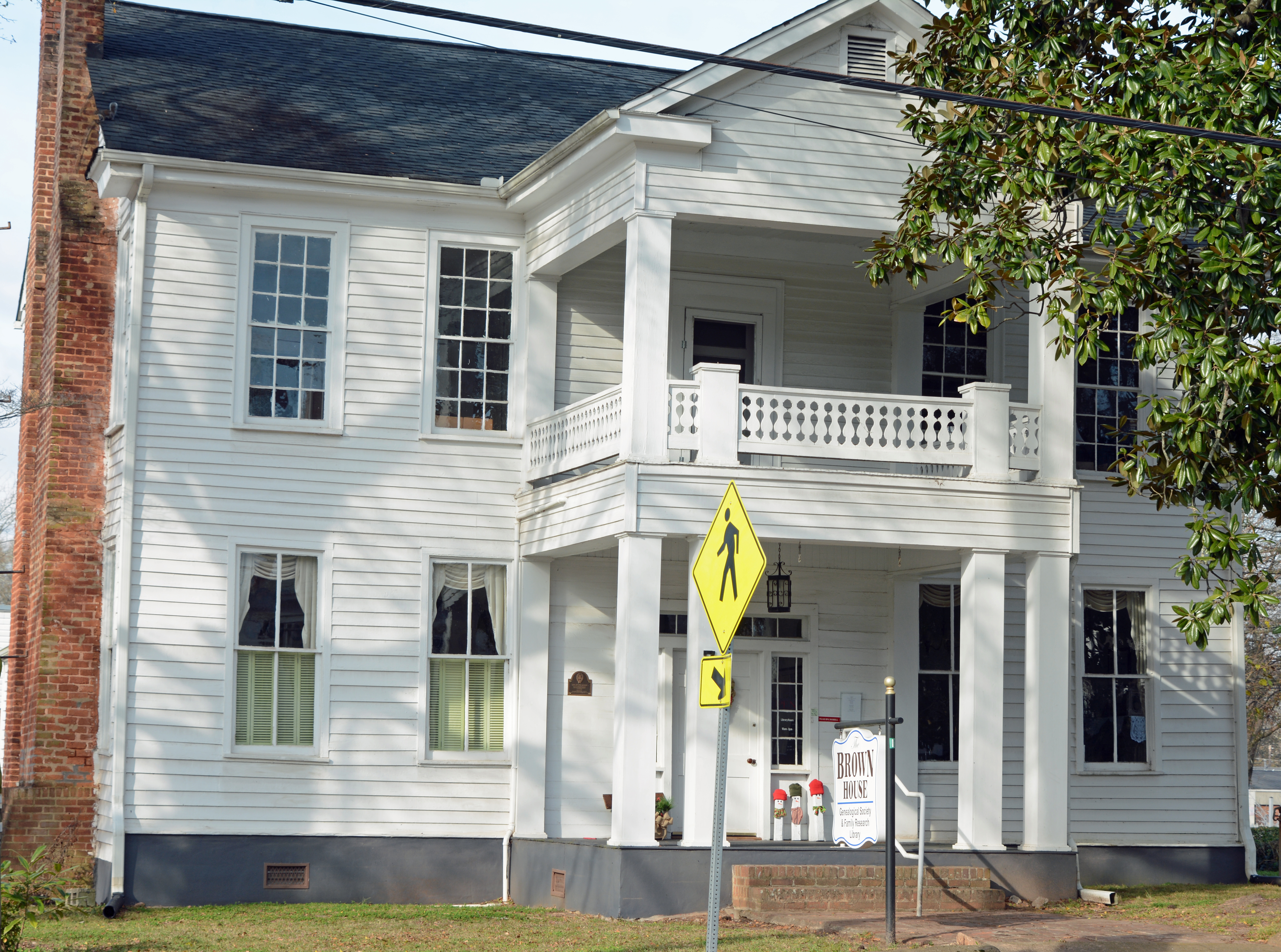

- Location within Georgia
- Location: 71 Macon St., McDonough, Georgia
- Coordinates: 33.445646°N 84.146667°W
- Area: less than one acre
- Built: 1826, 1883
- Part of: McDonough Historic District
- NRHP reference No.: 91000908
- Added to NRHP: August 1, 1991

The Brown House in McDonough, Georgia, at 71 Macon Street (U.S. 23 and Georgia Route 42), was built in 1826. It was listed on the National Register of Historic Places in 1991. It has also been known as the Brown House Hotel.

A small house on the property was built in 1826. The second story and the two-story portico were added as part of a major expansion in 1883, when it was owned by Mrs. Asa Brown. It served as a hotel from some time around 1874 to 1883, until some later date.

It is also a contributing building in the McDonough Historic District. It now houses the Genealogical Society of Henry and Clayton Counties, Inc. and its Family Research Library.
