= Henry County High School =

Former school in Georgia, United States

Location
- 401 Tomlinson St; McDonough, Georgia 30253; United States; 33.44919°N 84.13351°W

Information
- Type: Public, coeducational
- Motto: "From GOOD, To GREAT!"
- Established: 1990
- Superintendent: Ethan Hildreth
- Principal: Scott John
- Faculty: 100
- Teaching staff: 74.30 (FTE)
- Enrollment: 1,359 (2024-2025)
- Student to teacher ratio: 18.29
- Campus: Suburbs
- Color
- Mascot: Warhawk
- Website: School website

Henry County High School was a public high school hosting grades 9–12, located in McDonough, Georgia, United States, and operated by the Henry County School District. The school is located in the Atlanta metropolitan area. Enrollment was around 1,100. The high school's campus included the Henry County Performing Arts Center and the Henry County Academy for Advanced Studies. It had recently seen major renovations and additions to its facilities, and as a result became the largest public high school in Henry County. Henry County High School students were relocated to the newly built McDonough High School following the conclusion of the 2018–2019 school year.

== History ==
Henry County High School is the oldest public high school in the county.

== Career, technical, and agricultural education classes ==
Henry County High School offers a wide variety of career, technical, and agricultural education classes, more than any other school in the county, including the following:

- Video broadcasting
- Culinary arts
- Business and computer science
- Marketing
- Engineering and drafting
- Electronics
- AC/DC circuits
- Healthcare science
- Agri-science
- Human growth & development
- Salon services
- Law and justice
- Government & public safety
- Naval science

== Henry Academy for Advanced Studies ==
The campus of Henry County High School serves as a community host for college and adult education programs offered to the local community, and dual enrollment programs offered to high school students. Institutions of higher learning with a presence on campus include Clayton State University, Gordon State College, and Southern Crescent Technical College.

== Championships and sports ==
Henry county participated in baseball, men's and women's basketball, cheer leading (basketball and competitive), core course, men's cross country, women's cross country, football, golf, men's and women's soccer, softball, men's and women's tennis, track, volleyball, wrestling, three-position air rifle, and orienteering winning the 2014-2019 U.S. National Championships for the best JROTC team.

== Notable alumni ==
- Kevin Gillespie, chef
- Jason Heyward, Major League Baseball player
- Dalvin Tomlinson, National Football League player
