= Renford Cogle =

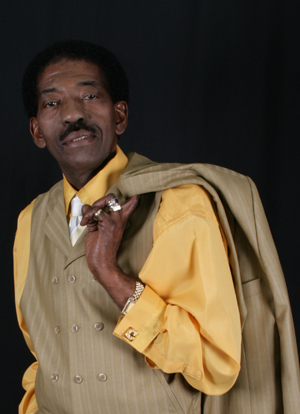

Background information
- Also known as: Rennie
- Born: Renford George Cogle; 20 June 1948
- Origin: Kingston, Jamaica, West Indies
- Died: 5 April 2019 (aged 70)
- Genres: Rocksteady, reggae
- Occupations: Singer, songwriter, arranger
- Years active: 1971– 2019

Renford "Rennie" Cogle (born 20 June 1948), is a singer and songwriter whose career spans more than three decades and about as many continents. His musical career started in 1972 when his friend, the late Delroy "Smooth Operator" Wilson, listened to his music and recorded "You Keep On Running". This was to be the first of many number one hits written by Cogle. Subsequent songs such as "Sweet Rose"; "Ring of Gold"; "Rock It To Me"; "Babylon Policy" and "Passion of Love" became international hit singles and were performed by Tony Brevett and The Melodians.

"Everybody Bawling"; "Heart Breaking Love"; "Build Me Up"; "By the Rivers of Babylon"; "It's My Delight" and "Sweet Sensation", performed by Brent Dowe, are among the other hit songs he has written. "Sweet Sensation" was a worldwide success for British group UB40, was featured in EastEnders, a popular British television soap opera, and was recently re-recorded by the Detroit Cobras. Cogle has also written Sharon Blacks "Struggling", Marcia Griffiths "Survival" and Joe Coleman's "The Way I Feel For You".

In 1982 Cogle contacted Polygram Records which is now Universal Music Publishers and signed a contract with them for thirty-nine of his songs. In 1987 the contract with Universal Music Publishers was re-written to include additional songs he had written; by 1997 this contract was finalized.

== Early life ==
Cogle was born in the Denham Town area of Kingston, Jamaica, WI on 20 June 1948 to Roberto Cogle and Doris Brown. He first attended Tweedside Primary School in Clarendon, Jamaica where his grandmother resided. His father, Roberto Cogle was a descendant of Irish immigrants. At the age of 12 he was taken back to Kingston by his mother and father. As a child, Cogle attained his early schooling at the Ebenezer Primary School located at Spanish Town Road and Darling Street. Ebenezer Primary School was later to become Operation Friendship. The students were then transferred to Denham Town Primary School where he found a passion in writing poetry. He later put melody to the words, and performed the songs during weekly music concerts.

The concerts were a significant part of the early development for music appreciation at the primary level. He says, "Every Friday, school concerts were held and students were encouraged to perform using their special talents. I used to sing the songs I wrote and they were always well received."

Cogle was an exceptional student and while at Denham Town Primary School, he took the Common Entrance Examination and received a government scholarship to attend Knockalva Agricultural Training School (KATC) in Montpelier, Hanover. He graduated after three years and received another government scholarship to attend the Jamaica School of Agriculture in Twickenham Park in St. Catherine, Jamaica. He received yet a third scholarship to attend U.W.I. St. Augustine in Trinidad but due to the passing of his mother at the time he turned it down. The passing of his mother he says was, "devastating to me."

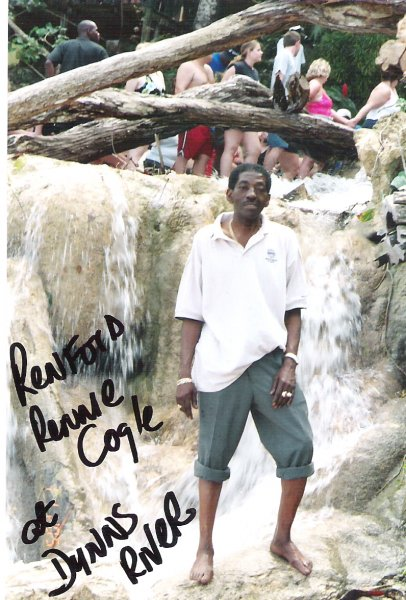
Rennie at Dunn's River Falls, Jamaica, WI

He went on to work for the now defunct Jamaica Railway Corporation (JRC) at its head office where he stayed for seven years. He has three brothers and one surviving sister of two. His father is also deceased.

== Adult life ==
In 1976 Cogle immigrated to New York and in 1979 he joined the United States Army. He was sent to South Carolina for basic training and then to Fort Lee in New Jersey to do an eight-month course in clerical and book-keeping studies. On finishing the eight-month course, Cogle was deployed to Wiesbaden in Germany where he continued to write songs, recording them to tape cassettes; he also searched for his records for as he says, "I did not know where else other than Jamaica my records were."

He was assigned to Tank Unit where he was in charge of ordering parts for the army tanks in the field. His vehicle was specially built to carry tank parts so that when the need arose for tanks to get replacements, they would be readily available. Cogle remained in Germany for four years. At the end of his tour, he was stationed at Fort Bliss in El Paso, Texas near the Mexican border. In 1985, six years after serving the United States Army, he was honorably discharged with the title Specialist IV. Renford has a granddaughter named Sarai.

== Appearances ==
Rennie Cogle Live on WB Radio January 2010

== Other ventures ==
Cogle has recently collaborated with Avis 'Singing R.N.' Williams, writing the song "Can You Feel It" for her album Avis Unwinds. Back To School is another album which Cogle is currently working on.

== Discography ==
Albums

- Baby Steps (2006)
- Renford "Rennie" Cogle: The Man and His Music (2009)
- The Greatest Hits of Rennie Cogle (2009)

Singles

- Back to School (2009)
- Ways of a Child (2010)
- Dancing Floor (2011)

== Music awards ==
- 1969 Provisional Member of the Performing Rights Society. London, England.
- 1970 Song of the Year Award "Sweet Sensation." Jamaica, W.I.
- 1973 Song of the Year Award "Build Me Up." Jamaica, W.I.
- 2006 Outstanding Achievement Award from Culture Jam –Star Entertainment Faces Entertainment and Marketing Inc. U.S.A.
- 2007 International Songwriters Award from Icons of Soul (Fourth Edition). U.S.A
- 2008 Songwriter of the Year from Media, Magazine and Radio Personalities. U.S.A.
- 2009 Best Album Award Renford Cogle – The Man and His Music from the Music Alliance Association. U.S.A.
- He was placed second in the Tokyo Song Festival for "No Sweeter Way to Work it Out."
- 2010 Winner Special Producers "Respect" Award – International Reggae and World Music Awards(IRAWMA). U.S.A.

== See also ==
- The Melodians
- Marcia Griffiths

== Bibliography ==
- Turner, Aaliyah, "Rivers of Babylon" writer still has the Midas touch. Street Hype.
- Simpson, Barbara A., Renford George Cogle – A Musical Genius.
- Martin, Angela, Renford Cogle – The Man and His Music.
