= Natalia Alaverdian =

London-based Russian fashion businesswoman

Natalia Alaverdian is the fashion designer, creative director and founder of A.W.A.K.E. MODE. She is also a fashion editor, photographer, and a stylist.

== Biography ==
She was born in Moscow, Russia and raised in Belgium. After some internships in London after school she went to visit her relatives in Moscow and landed minor jobs in Marie Claire Russia and later in Grazia Russia. For some time she was the fashion director for Harper's Bazaar Russia and at that time she did some photography for the magazine. At that time hers was "street style". She founded her own brand A.W.A.K.E. in 2012 in London.

In an interview she told how she came up with the name of the brand. Initially she decided on the name "Awake", but then she thought this is a too generic word. She decided to add points between the letters and then tried to fit the words to the acronym. Her efforts resulted in the phrase "All Wonderful Adventures Kindle Enthusiasm".
