= Henry County Courthouse (Georgia) =

- U.S. National Register of Historic Places
- U.S. Historic district – Contributing property
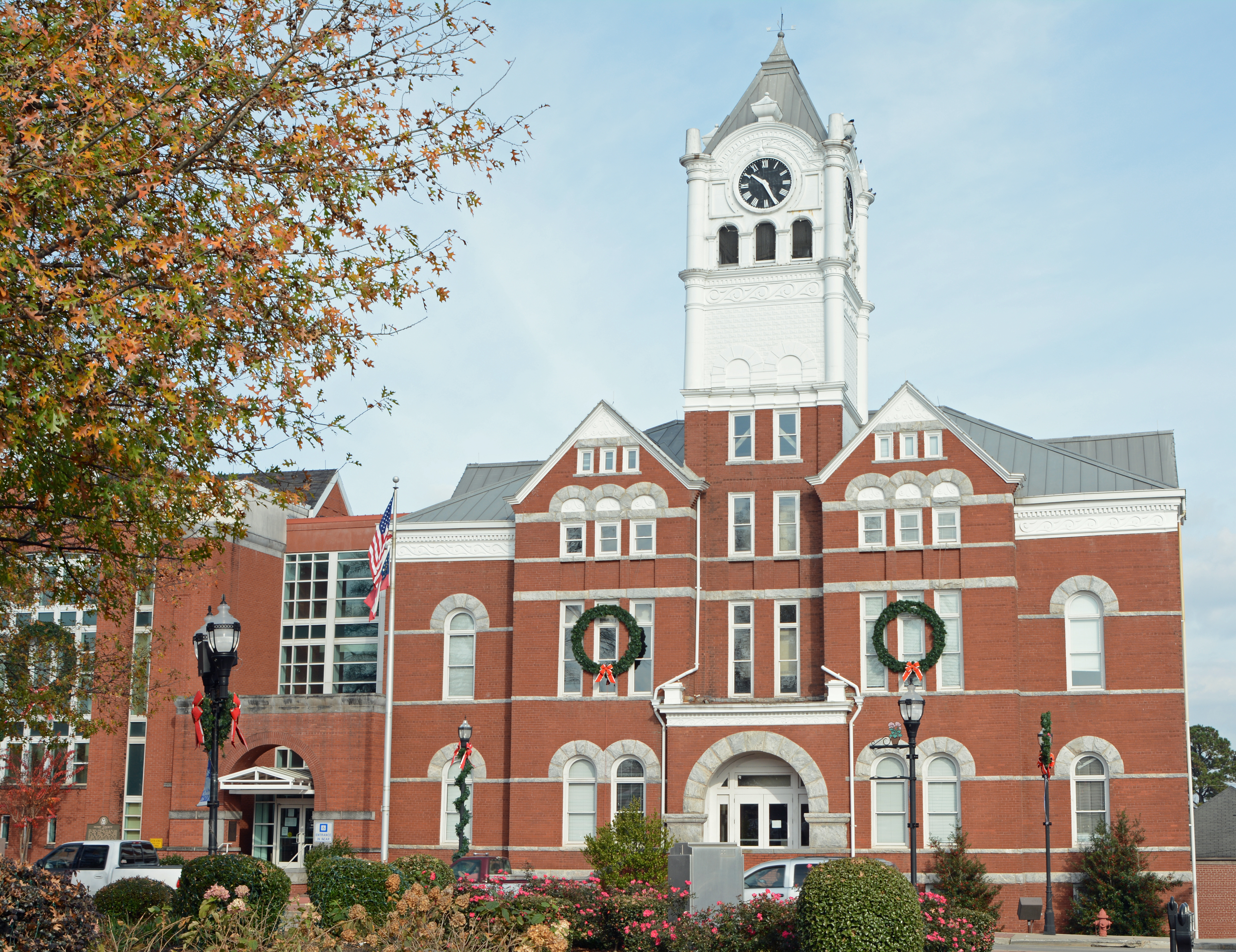
- The courthouse in 2015

- Location within Georgia Location within the United States
- Location: Courthouse Sq., McDonough, Georgia
- Coordinates: 33.44786°N 84.14674°W
- Area: 1 acre (0.40 ha)
- Built: 1895
- Built by: Heifner, Frank P.
- Architect: Golucke & Stewart
- Architectural style: Romanesque Revival
- Part of: McDonough Historic District
- MPS: Georgia County Courthouses TR
- NRHP reference No.: 80001092
- Added to NRHP: September 18, 1980

Henry County Courthouse is a county courthouse in McDonough, Georgia, county seat of Henry County, Georgia. It was built in 1897 in a Romanesque Revival architecture style according to designs by Golucke & Stewart. It was added to the National Register of Historic Places on September 18, 1980. It is located in Courthouse Square.

It is also a contributing building in the McDonough Historic District.

== See also ==
- National Register of Historic Places listings in Henry County, Georgia
