= Tatyana Usova =

Russian fashion model (born 1987)

Tatiana Usova
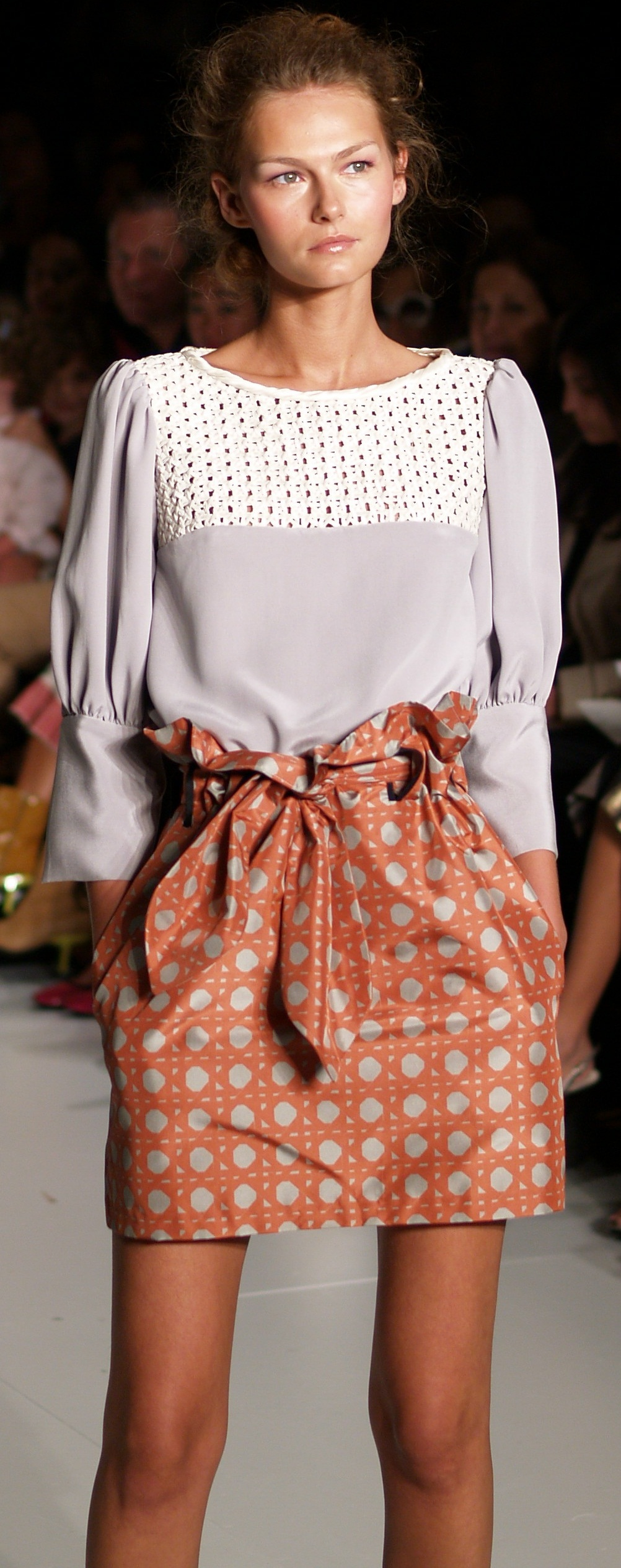
- Usova modeling at New York Fashion Week in September 2006
- Born: Татьяна Усова; 1987 (age 38–39); Siberia, Russia
- Occupation: Model
- Years active: 2002–present
- Modeling information
- Height: 1.79 m (5 ft 10 1/2 in)
- Hair color: Brown
- Eye color: Green

Tatiana Usova (born 9 March 1987) is a Russian fashion model.

== Early life ==
Usova was born in Siberia, Russia in 9 March 1987.

== Career ==
Usova debuted at the spring Emporio Armani show in Milan in September 2004 and was signed by One Model Management in New York in 2005 following that show.

In February 2006 she walked for fashion shows for the fall collections by Alberta Ferretti, Bottega Veneta, Dolce & Gabbana and MaxMara in Milan. She opened the fall Akris show in Paris the following month.

Throughout 2006 and 2007, she appeared in several campaigns including the 2006 Dolce & Gabbana spring ad campaign, as well as Elle, Italian Vogue, Japanese Vogue, Numéro, and V.

In the beginning of 2007, she left the agency One Model Management to sign with Marilyn Agency in Paris and New York. She then appeared on the May issue of Amica and became the face of Vivienne Westwood's Let It Rock perfume. On 10 September 2007 she signed with Elite Model Management in Milan.

In January 2008, she walked the spring collection for Armani Privé, Christian Dior, Christian Lacroix, and Valentino in Paris. She then appeared on the March cover of the Russian Harper’s Bazaar alongside other Russian models and also becomes the face of Les Copains. In late 2008, she signed a cosmetics contract with Christian Dior's Night Diamond.

In 2010, she appeared in the July edition of Elle Italia with Tatiana Lyadochkina.

She has also been a cover girl for Surface magazine. She has previously been signed with Beatrice Model agency, Munich Models, Nathalie Models, View Management (Spain), and Independent (formerly ICM Models).
