= Astrid Muñoz =

Puerto Rican model and photographer

- Born: 1974 (age 51–52); San Juan, Puerto Rico
- Modeling information
- Height: 5 ft 8.5 in (1.74 m)
- Hair color: Dark brown
- Eye color: Brown
- Agency: IMG Models (New York, Milan, London); View Management (Barcelona)

Astrid Muñoz (born 1974) is a Puerto Rican model turned photographer.

== Early years ==
Muñoz was the first of three siblings born in San Juan, Puerto Rico. Her father, Teodoro was a nuclear engineer and her mother, Astrid, a retired executive secretary. They were both strict in their upbringing of Muñoz, who received her primary and secondary education in San Juan. She enjoyed going to the beach and reading fashion magazines as a young girl. In 1988, then-fourteen-year-old Muñoz was offered an opportunity to model in Spain, but her mother objected.

== Modeling career ==
In 1993, Muñoz was visiting a friend in Miami when a modeling agent suggested she try a career in fashion in France. Muñoz accepted the idea and left for France without consulting her parents. In Paris, she became one of the first latinas to break through as a model.

After working in Europe for several years, Muñoz relocated to New York City, where she appeared on the covers of notable fashion magazines such as Vogue, Marie Claire, L'Officiel, Elle, and Harper's Bazaar, and appeared in fashion campaigns and commercials for Balenciaga, Chanel, Dolce & Gabbana, GAP, L'Oréal, Mango, Nokia, Saks Fifth Avenue, Valentino, and Yves Saint Laurent "Rive Gauche" and "In Love Again" fragrances. Most recently, she is featured in the advertising campaign for Roberto Cavalli's new line for the chain H&M. Her runway work includes Christian Dior, Chanel, Dolce & Gabbana, Dries van Noten, Emanuel Ungaro, Eric Bergere, Erreuno, Gianfranco Ferré, Jill Stuart, Jean Paul Gaultier, Missoni, Moschino, Nicole Miller, Oscar de la Renta, and Valentino.

She has been represented by the agencies Next, Marilyn, Riccardo Gay, and Strom, but is currently signed to IMG Models.

In the June 2006 edition of Hola de España magazine, Muñoz was ranked among the most beautiful women in the world. That same month she was featured in Spanish GQ with Joaquin Cortes (flamenco dancer).

== Photographer ==
In 1998, Muñoz took a course in Photojournalism with Joseph Rodriguez, at the ICP institute in New York City. She began her hobby by expressing her feelings through her photographic work. She traveled to the valleys of the Massai Mara and to the Pampas of Argentina. Her interest in the customs and folklore of the Argentine Gauchos, was the instrumental factor which led her to present an exhibition of the "Gaucho" theme at the Jaeger-LeCoultre boutique in London on January 31, 2012. Her work was also published in Jaeger-LeCoultre latest publication Yearbook Five. When she traveled to Peru and Mexico she used her camera to document the customs and way of life of the native people. On September 27, 2013, her photographic work was exhibited at the "La Halle Freyssinet", "Skye Photography & Installation" in Paris. She also does fashion photography and her work has appeared in Vogue, GQ, Vanity Fair, Tatler, Marie Claire, and Vissionaire.

On October 20, 2013, Muñoz and her photographic work were featured in the section "Por Dentro" (Inside) of "El Nuevo Dia", a Puerto Rican newspaper. The interview for the section was made by Carmen Graciela Díaz.

== See also ==
- List of Puerto Ricans
