= McKenna Hellam =

American fashion model from Atlanta, Georgia

- Born: June 24, 2000 (age 25); Atlanta, Georgia, U.S.
- Modeling information
- Height: 1.85 m (6 ft 1 in)
- Hair color: Brown
- Eye color: Blue-green
- Agency: Kollectiv Mgmt (New York); K. Starr Management (Atlanta); Why Not Models (Milan)

McKenna Hellam is an American fashion model.

== Early life ==
Hellam, who has an older sister named Kaitlyn, was born in Atlanta, Georgia and grew up on a 15-acre farm in McDonough, Georgia. An honor student and athlete, she graduated high school two years early as well as being an equestrienne.

== Career ==
At the age of 15, Hellam signed to IMG Models. She debuted walking for Alexander Wang's S/S 2017 show, who requested that she cut her hair. That haircut was done by Guido Palau and proved to be a successful change for her career as she subsequently walked in 24 shows in her first season, including Prabal Gurung, Givenchy, Burberry, Missoni, and Dolce & Gabbana.

Hellam has been on the cover of the Evening Standard's magazine, Vogue Turkey (alongside models Charlee Fraser and Julia Hafstrom), and Wonderland. She has appeared in advertisements for Salvatore Ferragamo, Chanel, Polo Ralph Lauren, Nike, and Stella McCartney.
