= Globe Hotel (McDonough, Georgia) =

Historic hotel in the US

- U.S. National Register of Historic Places
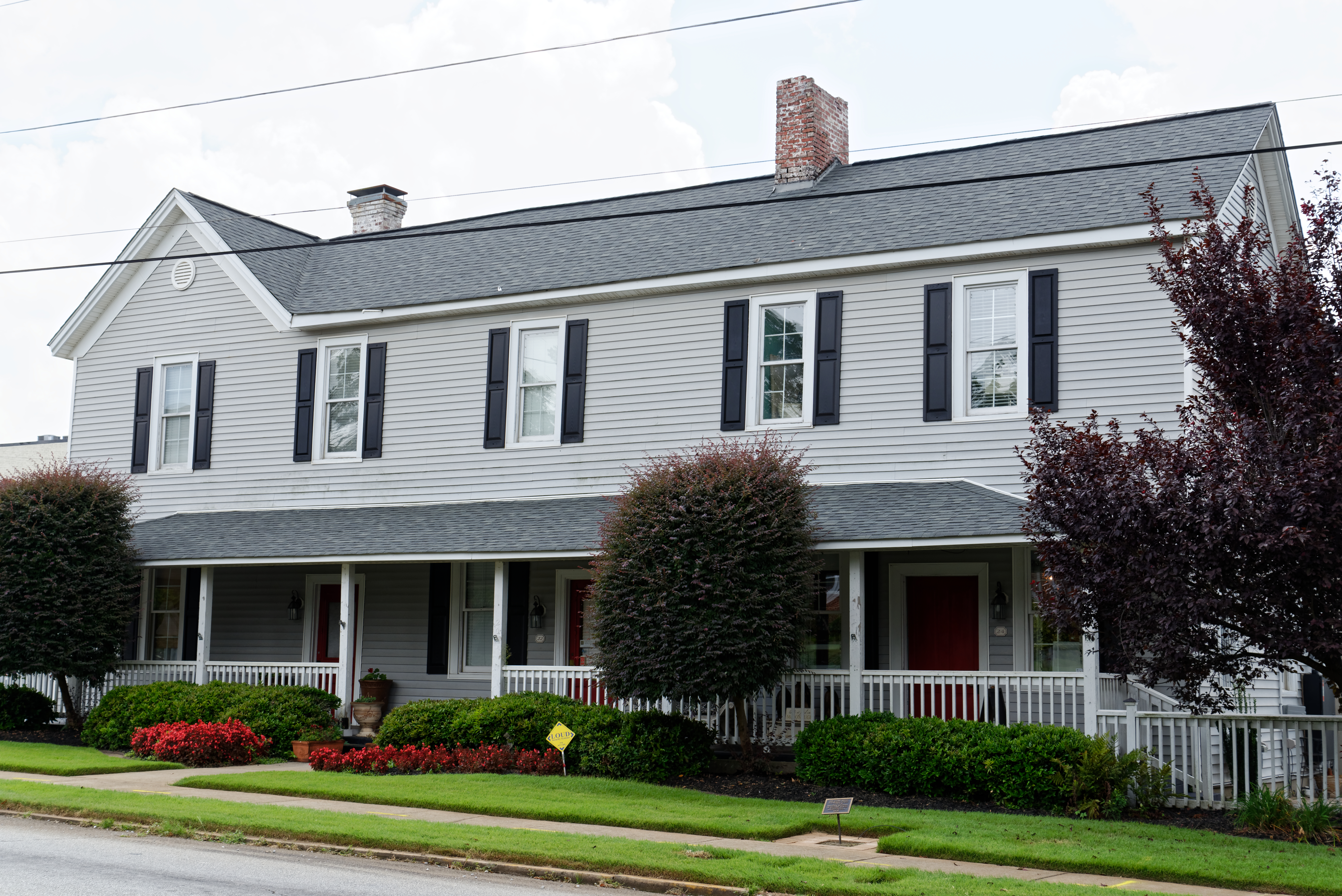

- Location within Georgia Location within the United States
- Location: 20 Jonesboro St., McDonough, Georgia
- Coordinates: 33°26′51″N 84°8′53″W
- Built: 1827
- Architectural style: Stick/Eastlake
- NRHP reference No.: 85001980
- Added to NRHP: September 5, 1985

Globe Hotel in McDonough, Georgia, USA, also known as Dunn House, was built in 1827 and expanded in the late 1800s. It is a two-story frame building. In the 1930s, the building was moved about one block from its original location facing the courthouse square. It has some elements of Stick/Eastlake architecture in the newer section.

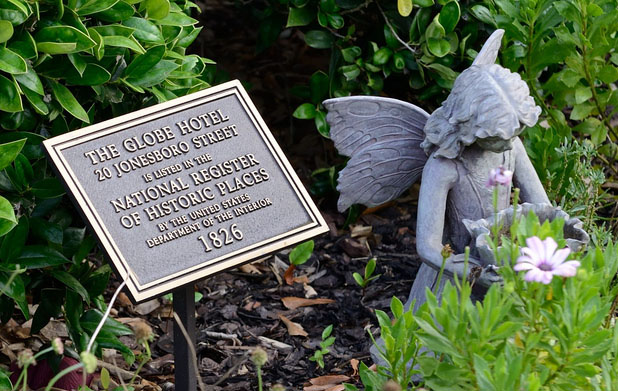
Historic marker

It was listed on the National Register of Historic Places in 1985.
