= Renford Reese =

American political scientist (born 1967)

Renford R. Reese
- Born: July 24, 1967 (age 59)
- Education: Vanderbilt University
- Occupations: Professor; Author

Renford Reese (born July 24, 1967) is an American professor in the political science department at Cal Poly Pomona and the founder/director of the Prison Education Project. He is the author of Violence in America: From a 'Criminal's' Perspective (2024), Prison Race (2006), Leadership in the LAPD: Walking the Tightrope (2005), and American Paradox: Young Black Men (2004).

== Early life and college career ==
Reese was born in McDonough, Georgia ("Blacksville"). He is the son of Earnest Reese and Artelia Reese. His father was one of the first African American journalists to write for a major newspaper in the South—the Atlanta Journal-Constitution. His mother, a descendant of the quilters of Gee's Bend, AL, was the principal at his high school—Henry County High School.

In 1985, he entered Vanderbilt University and played football for four years. He played various defensive positions. In the May 4, 2010, article, "Making An Impact in the Field of Life" written by David Hudson, Reese is quoted as saying "...at 193 pounds I became the smallest middle linebacker in the SEC... and later I went from the smallest middle linebacker to the biggest cornerback in the league." By his senior year, he had become what some call "a shutdown defensive back" and his achievements playing for the Commodores attracted the attention of some pro scouts. Later, he played in the Blue-Gray all-star game and attended the NFL Combine in 1990. However, during the NFL draft, Reese was not selected.

== Professional career ==
He graduated in 1989 from Vanderbilt University with a Bachelor of Arts degree in political science. In 1990, he went on to receive his master's degree in public policy from the Vanderbilt Institute for Public Policy Studies. In 1996, he received his Ph.D. in public policy from the University of Southern California's School of Policy, Planning, and Development; he conducted his dissertation research on intergroup relations and ethnic conflict at the United Nations Research Institute for Social Development in Geneva, Switzerland. In 2008 his author's quote #294 appeared on Starbucks cups worldwide: "Insensitivity makes arrogance ugly; empathy is what makes humility beautiful." In 2009, he received a Fulbright Scholar award to lecture in the American Studies program at the University of Hong Kong. In 2022, Reese gifted $100K to Cal Poly Pomona.

=== Colorful Flags Program ===
In 1993, as a second year doctoral student, he created the Colorful Flags program. His dissatisfaction with race relations and the death of Latasha Harlins in South Central Los Angeles inspired him to create this multicultural human relations program. This program is designed to break down "ethnic mistrust" by educating individuals with certain cultural facts and five basic human relation statements in the five most spoken languages focused in a school or organizational community(excluding English). This program has serviced over 130,000 K-12 students in 17 school districts in Southern California and has also serviced police departments, social service agencies, and various other organizations. Reese was featured on ESPN in a series, called "Realizing The Dream." He was recognized for his work with The Colorful Flags Program.

=== Rodney King ===
He mentored Rodney King from 1997 to 2000. Los Angeles Times magazine writer Ed Leibowitz writes about Reese's relationship with King in the article, "The Beating and Riots Are Fading Into History, but Rodney King's Life Remains a Series of Trials." According to this article, Reese brought King to speak to his classes at Cal Poly Pomona and gave him books to read, taught him how to swing a golf club, and played tennis with him during their mentoring sessions. In the USA Today article, Reese stated Rodney "couldn't carry the burdens of being an icon for civil rights. From the very outset our expectations of Rodney King were too high." According to Reese, "Rodney never chose to be an icon. He was beaten one night, and all of a sudden he becomes a symbol for racial reconciliation and police reform. But he was never trained to be a change agent.(Werner)

According to Reese, the various civil rights leaders failed King. They should have known that he would be an icon for racial reconciliation and police reforms, so they should have protected him and groomed him—but they did not. "They dropped the ball with Rodney." In Reese's 2001 commentary in the Los Angeles Times, "We Still Can't Just Get Along," he discusses his relationship with Rodney and the lack of progress that has taken place since the 1992 Riots.

== Publications ==
=== American Paradox: Young Black Men (2004) ===
Based on the surveys of 756 young black men from ages 13–19 in Atlanta and Los Angeles, this book examines why young black men have embraced the counterproductive gangsta-thug persona.

=== Leadership in the LAPD: Walking the Tightrope (2005) ===
This book looks at the dilemma of LAPD police chiefs in accommodating their rank and file while appeasing the public.

=== Prison Race (2006) ===
This book examines why policymakers have embraced counterproductive criminal justice policies over the past two decades.

=== Violence in America: From a 'Criminal's' Perspective (2024) ===
This book explores why America is so violent from a 'criminal's' perspective.

== Films ==
=== Life Ain’t No Crystal Stair (2007) ===
This film is set in Los Angeles in the aftermath of the 1992 riots.

=== Prison Race: 511 (2017) ===
This is a documentary about how the Black Community is literally killing itself.

=== RA: A Lifer Cohort (2019) ===
This documentary captures the transition of formerly incarcerated “Lifers” who have just been released from the California prison system to the Reintegration Academy.

=== Kwagala (2020) ===
Volunteers from the Prison Education Project in California teach at the Sure Prospects School for Disabled Students. They learn as much as they teach and learn the concept of “Kwagala.”

=== PEP-Uganda (2020) ===
Volunteers from the Prison Education Project in California travel to Uganda to volunteer in Luzira Upper Prison and the Luzira women’s prison.

=== Is America a Myth? (2020) ===
This film explores whether the concept of ‘America’ is a myth?

=== Tomorrow: Women, Murder, Redemption (2021) ===
This film examines the circumstances of 10 women who were convicted of murder.

=== unBROKEN (2022) ===
This documentary examines the story of a former foster youth who refused to be broken by the system.

=== PEP-Scotland (2023) ===
This documentary is about forgiveness, healing, and transformation: a transnational story about humanity
