= Henry Daily Herald =

The Henry Herald, Henry County’s News Source Since 1874. Published twice weekly newspaper in McDonough, Georgia, United States, and serves as the county's official legal organ. Published on Wednesday and the Weekend Edition Saturday/Sunday. Circulation is 15,000 plus. As of 2019, to subscribe to this newspaper (mailed to Henry County residents only) is $13 Three Months/$26 6 months/$52 per year. It is delivered via the U.S. Postal Service.

== Staff ==
- Senior Vice President, Circulation: Bob McCray
- Editor: Alice Queen
- Sr. Multi Media Acct Exec: Mary Ann Holland

The Henry Daily Herald is a part of Southern Community Newspapers in Lawrenceville, Georgia. Sister publications in Georgia (in addition to the Clayton News Daily) include:

- Gwinnett Daily Post (Lawrenceville)
- Rockdale Citizen (Conyers)
- Newton Citizen (Covington)
- Jackson Progress-Argus (Jackson)
- Albany Herald (Albany)
- Clayton News (Jonesboro, Georgia)
