= McDonough, Georgia =

- City
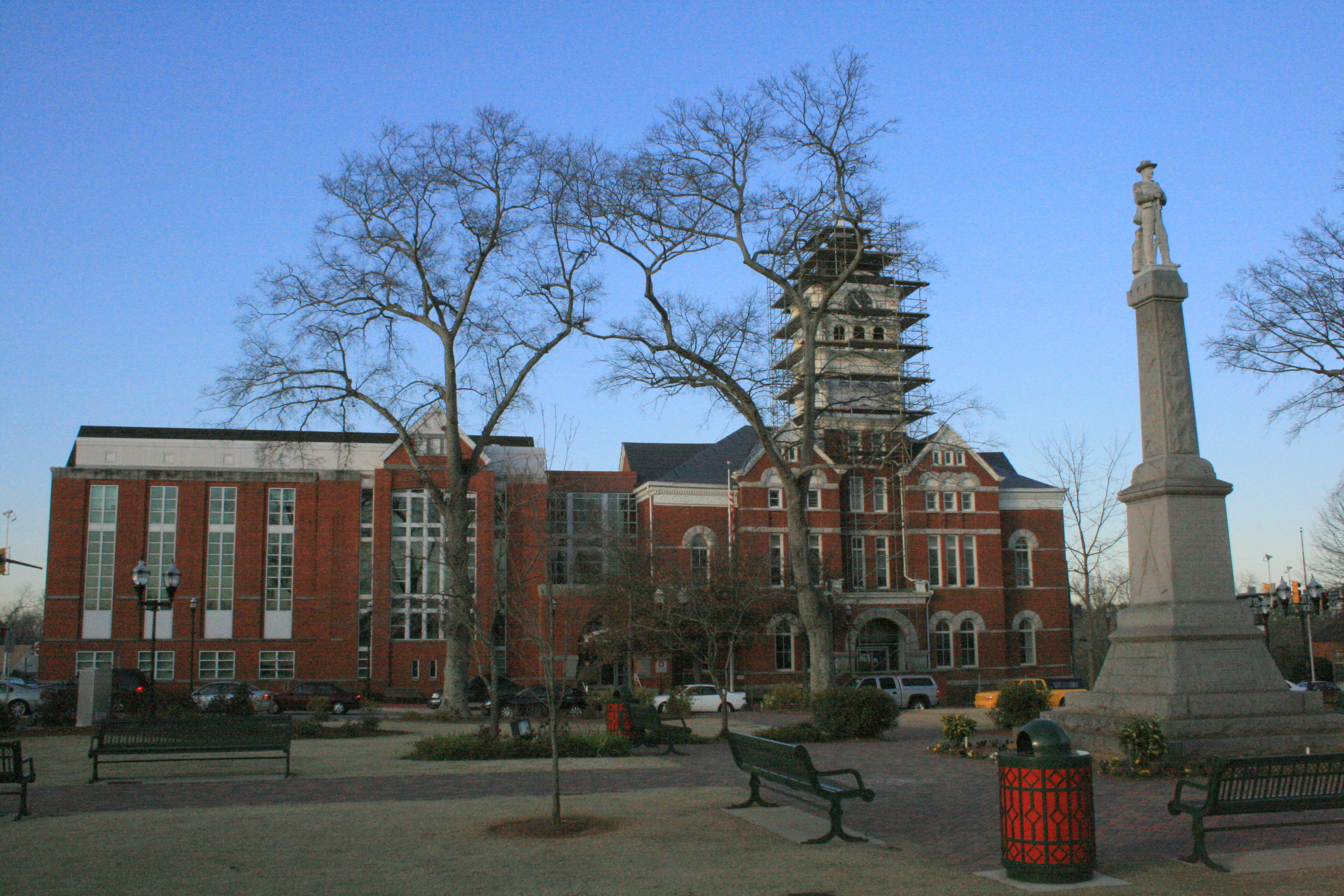
- Henry County Courthouse and Confederate monument

- Flag Seal
- Nickname: The Geranium City
- Interactive map of McDonough, Georgia
- Coordinates: 33°26′50″N 84°8′49″W
- Country: United States
- State: Georgia
- County: Henry
- Named for: Thomas Macdonough

Area
  - Total: 13.02 sq mi (33.71 km^{2})
  - Land: 12.85 sq mi (33.29 km^{2})
  - Water: 0.16 sq mi (0.42 km^{2})
- Elevation: 863 ft (263 m)

Population (2020)
  - Total: 29,051
  - Density: 2,260.3/sq mi (872.72/km^{2})
- Time zone: UTC-5 (Eastern (EST))
  - Summer (DST): UTC-4 (EDT)
- ZIP Codes: 30252–30253
- Area codes: 770/678/470
- FIPS code: 13-48624
- GNIS feature ID: 0317901
- Website: www.mcdonoughga.org

McDonough is a city in Henry County, Georgia, United States. It is part of the Atlanta metropolitan area. Its population was 29,051 in 2020. The city is the county seat of Henry County. The unincorporated communities of Blacksville, Flippen, Kelleytown, and Ola are located near McDonough, and addresses in those communities have McDonough ZIP codes.

== History ==
The town was named for naval officer Commodore Thomas Macdonough and founded in 1823 around a traditional town square design. The buildings surrounding the square are intact, although there are some vacancies. The county courthouse and historic jail building are on the north side near the Welcome Center in a historically maintained Standard Oil service station, built in 1920. The station also houses the Main Street Program Office.

One block east of the square, the town's original cotton warehouse has been replaced with the Henry County Judicial Center. In the same area the Henry County Courthouse Annex has an original oil on canvas "Cotton Gin" (4 1/2 by 11 feet) by artist Jean Charlot. He painted this oil in 1942 for the town post office. His works can be found all over the world in everything from children's books to large murals.

The town was a relay station on the New York City to New Orleans stagecoach line and was connected by other stage lines with Fayetteville and Decatur, and with Macon by way of Jackson.

== Geography ==
McDonough is in central Henry County, 28 miles (45 km) southeast of downtown Atlanta. U.S. Route 23 passes through the center of the city, leading northwest 9 miles (14 km) to Stockbridge and south 7 miles (11 km) to Locust Grove. Interstate 75 passes through the southwestern arm of the city, with access from Exits 216, 218, and 221. I-75 leads northwest to Atlanta and southeast 56 miles (90 km) to Macon.

According to the United States Census Bureau, the city has a total area of 12.9 square miles (33.4 km^{2}), of which 12.7 square miles (32.9 km^{2}) are land and 0.2 square miles (0.5 km^{2}), or 1.50%, are water.

== Demographics ==
Historical population
| Census | Pop. | Note | %± |
|---|---|---|---|
| 1870 | 320 | | — |
| 1880 | 320 | | 0.0% |
| 1890 | 515 | | 60.9% |
| 1900 | 683 | | 32.6% |
| 1910 | 882 | | 29.1% |
| 1920 | 1,263 | | 43.2% |
| 1930 | 1,068 | | −15.4% |
| 1940 | 1,232 | | 15.4% |
| 1950 | 1,635 | | 32.7% |
| 1960 | 2,224 | | 36.0% |
| 1970 | 2,675 | | 20.3% |
| 1980 | 2,778 | | 3.9% |
| 1990 | 2,929 | | 5.4% |
| 2000 | 8,493 | | 190.0% |
| 2010 | 22,084 | | 160.0% |
| 2020 | 29,051 | | 31.5% |
| 2025 (est.) | 33,395 | ▲ | 15.0% |
U.S. Decennial Census; 1850-1870 1870-1880; 1890-1910 1920-1930; 1940 1950 1960; 1970 1980 1990; 2000 2010; 2025

=== 2020 census ===
As of the 2020 census, McDonough had a population of 29,051, 10,531 households, and 5,778 families. The median age was 34.2 years. 26.5% of residents were under the age of 18 and 10.6% of residents were 65 years of age or older. For every 100 females there were 82.5 males, and for every 100 females age 18 and over there were 77.3 males age 18 and over.

99.7% of residents lived in urban areas, while 0.3% lived in rural areas.

Of the 10,531 households, 38.9% had children under the age of 18 living in them. Of all households, 35.5% were married-couple households, 17.5% were households with a male householder and no spouse or partner present, and 40.7% were households with a female householder and no spouse or partner present. About 26.7% of all households were made up of individuals and 7.9% had someone living alone who was 65 years of age or older.

There were 11,083 housing units, of which 5.0% were vacant. The homeowner vacancy rate was 1.3% and the rental vacancy rate was 5.7%.

McDonough racial composition as of 2020
| Race | Number | Percent |
|---|---|---|
| White | 5,237 | 18.0% |
| Black or African American | 20,406 | 70.2% |
| American Indian and Alaska Native | 76 | 0.3% |
| Asian | 615 | 2.1% |
| Native Hawaiian and Other Pacific Islander | 36 | 0.1% |
| Some other race | 905 | 3.1% |
| Two or more races | 1,776 | 6.1% |
| Hispanic or Latino (of any race) | 1,960 | 6.7% |

== Economy ==
Snapper Inc. manufacturing residential and professional lawn care and snow removal equipment, was based in McDonough. The company began in 1894 as Southern Saw Works, and claims to have invented the first self-propelled rotary lawn mower. The company was sold to Briggs & Stratton, which operated the plant until its closure in 2015.

Goya Foods has its Atlanta offices in an unincorporated area near McDonough.

== Arts and culture ==
Several individual buildings and two historic districts in the city are listed on the National Register of Historic Places, including the downtown McDonough Historic District.

=== Events ===
The city hosts a Geranium Festival each springtime on the third Saturday in May, celebrating the locally grown flowers and community. The one-day festival serves as a showcase of local artistry and talent through the open-air craft markets and live musical performances. The festival is sponsored by the McDonough Lions Club, and held on the McDonough Square and surrounding areas.

== Sports ==
The city's semi-professional soccer team Georgia Revolution FC plays in the National Premier Soccer League at the Warhawk Stadium.

WWE developmental territory Deep South Wrestling was based in McDonough.

== Education ==
=== Henry County School District ===
The Henry County School District holds grades pre-school to grade twelve. The district has twenty eight elementary schools, nine middle schools, and ten high schools. The district has 1,543 full-time teachers and over 40,000 students.

==== Elementary schools ====
- Cotton Indian Elementary School
- Dutchtown Elementary School
- East Lake Elementary School
- Flippen Elementary School
- Hickory Flat Elementary School
- McDonough Elementary School
- New Hope Elementary School
- Oakland Elementary School
- Ola Elementary School
- Pleasant Grove Elementary School
- Rock Spring Elementary School
- Timber Ridge Elementary School
- Tussahaw Elementary School
- Unity Grove Elementary School
- Walnut Creek Elementary School
- Wesley Lakes Elementary School
- Impact Academy

==== Middle schools ====
- Eagle's Landing Middle School
- Dutchtown Middle School
- McDonough Middle School
- Ola Middle School
- Union Grove Middle School
- Impact Academy

==== High schools ====
- Academy for Advanced Studies
- Dutchtown High School
- Eagle's Landing High School
- Henry County Evening Academy
- McDonough High School
- Ola High School
- Union Grove High School
- Luella High School
- Impact Academy

=== Private schools ===
- Eagle's Landing Christian Academy
- New Creation Christian Academy
- Creekside Christian Academy
- Living Word Christian
- McDonough Christian Academy
- Sunbrook Academy at Luella
- The Sharon School
- Peoples Baptist Academy

=== Higher education ===
- Gordon State College has a satellite center in McDonough.
- Mercer University opened a campus in McDonough in 2003, and offers teacher education, criminal justice, and general studies.
- Grace Biblical Seminary, opened in 2004, offers theological and ministries degrees.
- Atlanta Bible College is located in McDonough.

== Media ==
WKKP is the local radio station, broadcasting on 100.9 FM and 1410 AM; it has a classic country format.

The Henry Herald is the local county news print media.

=== Film ===
- The film A Madea Christmas was filmed in the town square and around McDonough.
- The television show Resurrection was filmed in the town square and around McDonough.
- Scenes for the 1989 Civil War film, Glory, were filmed in the city.
- A pilot episode for Roswell was filmed on the city square at the old Phillips 66 service station.
- The 1977 film Smokey and the Bandit was filmed primarily in Georgia in the cities of McDonough, Jonesboro and Lithonia.

== Infrastructure ==
=== Transportation ===
Xpress GA provides local bus service.

McDonough is served by the following highways:

- Interstate 75
- U.S. Highway 23
- Georgia State Route 20
- Georgia State Route 42
- Georgia State Route 81
- Georgia State Route 155
- Georgia State Route 351
- Georgia State Route 401
- Georgia State Route 920

Until the mid-1960s the Southern Railway operated the Cincinnati to Miami Ponce de Leon, which made stops in McDonough.

== Notable people ==
- Jordan Akins, professional football player; tight end (NFL Houston Texans); presumably raised in McDonough
- Darrell Armstrong, former professional basketball player; resident of McDonough
- Erasmus W. Beck, United States congressman; born in McDonough in 1833
- Travis Bergen, MLB pitcher; born in McDonough in 1993
- Herman Cain, businessman and candidate for 2012 Republican presidential nomination; lived in McDonough
- Daz Cameron, top baseball outfield prospect in the Detroit Tigers organization
- Collective Soul, rock band; members were residents of McDonough in the early 2000s
- Antonio Gibson, American football player; attended high school in McDonough
- McKenna Hellam, fashion model; raised on a farm in McDonough
- Jason Heyward, former Atlanta Braves All-Star outfielder and first-round selection in the 2007 Major League Baseball draft; starting outfielder for 2016 World Series champion Chicago Cubs; attended high school in McDonough
- James T. Holtzclaw, Confederate general in the American Civil War; born in McDonough in 1833
- John Lunsford, politician and businessman
- Tre McBride, professional football player; wide receiver in NFL and XFL wide receiver; born in McDonough
- Matt Murton, professional baseball player (MLB Chicago Cubs, Oakland Athletics, and Colorado Rockies); Hanshin Tigers outfielder 2010–15; attended high school in McDonough
- Shaquille O'Neal, NBA Hall Of Fame center; resident of McDonough
- J. R. Pinnock, George Washington Colonials guard; attended high school in McDonough
- Renford Reese, professor, author
- Chris Rodriguez Jr., American football player
- Andrew Sloan, United States Congressman; born in McDonough in 1845
- Dalvin Tomlinson, professional football player; defensive end for the New York Giants; born in McDonough in 1994
- Austin Theory, wrestler, born in McDonough in 1997
- D. J. White, professional football player; cornerback for Indianapolis Colts
- James W. Wise, United States congressman; born in McDonough in 1868

== In popular culture ==
"The McDonough Road" is mentioned by Rhett Butler in the 1939 film, Gone with the Wind.
