= 2024 New York Giants season =

100th season in franchise history

- Owner: John Mara; Steve Tisch
- General manager: Joe Schoen
- Head coach: Brian Daboll
- Home stadium: MetLife Stadium

Results
- Record: 3–14
- Division place: 4th NFC East
- Playoffs: Did not qualify
- Pro Bowlers: NT Dexter Lawrence; WR Malik Nabers

Uniform
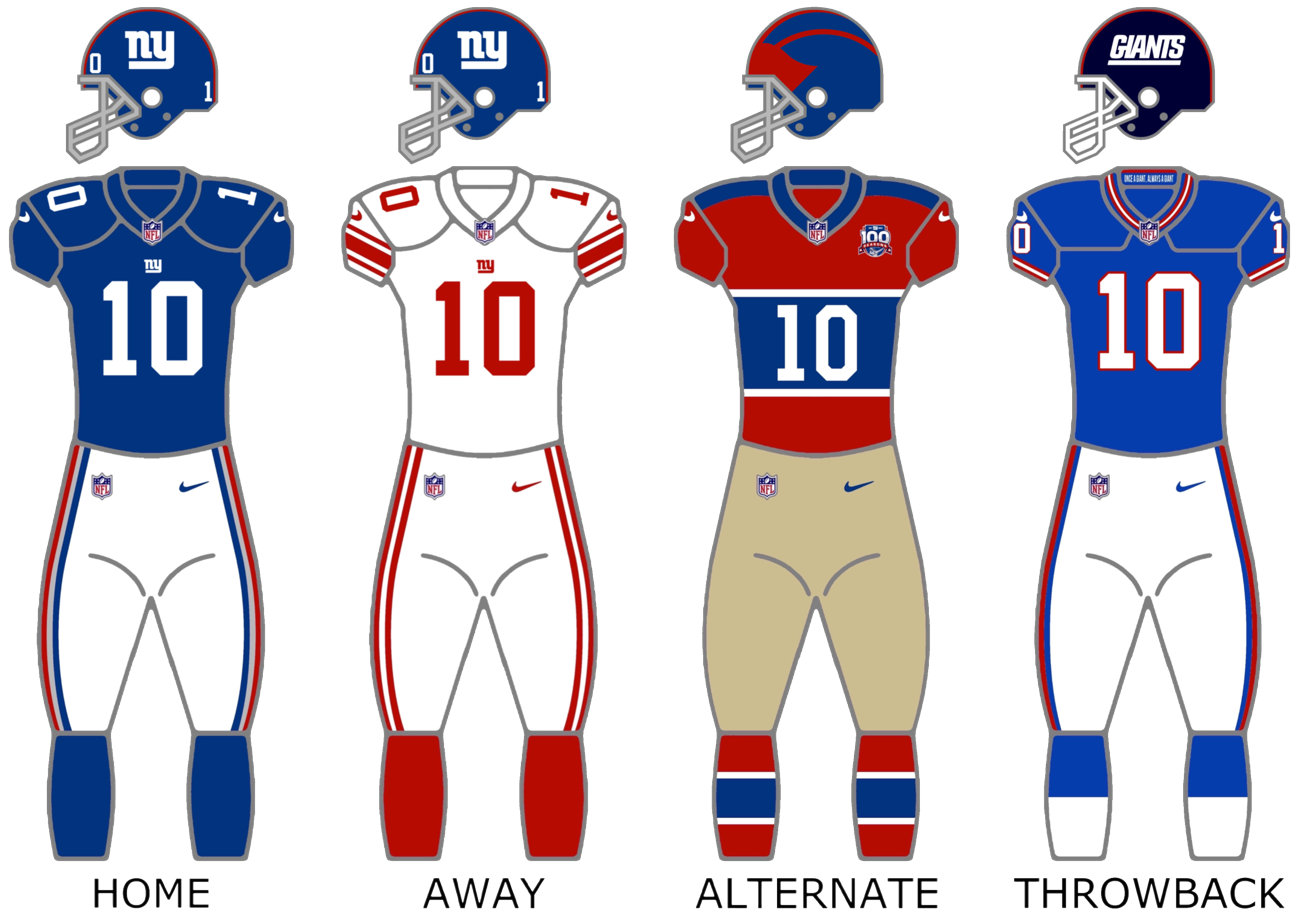

The 2024 season was the New York Giants' 100th in the National Football League (NFL) and their third under the head coach/general manager tandem of Brian Daboll and Joe Schoen—the first time since Tom Coughlin was the head coach that a tandem lasted three or more seasons. The Giants failed to improve on their 6–11 record from 2023 following a Week 14 loss to the New Orleans Saints. This was the first season since 2017 without Saquon Barkley on the roster, as he signed a three-year deal with the Philadelphia Eagles during the offseason. A commemorative 100th anniversary patch was made for the season.

Following a loss to the Tampa Bay Buccaneers in week 12, the Giants suffered their seventh losing season in eight years. They were eliminated from playoff contention for the second consecutive season after a Thanksgiving Day loss to the Dallas Cowboys, as well as the first team of the year to be eliminated. A loss to the Baltimore Ravens in week 15 locked the Giants into finishing last in the NFC East for the first time since 2021. Additionally, a loss to the Atlanta Falcons the following week gave the Giants their first 10-game losing streak in franchise history. Following a loss to the Eagles in week 18, the Giants were swept by all of their division rivals for the first time in franchise history. This season was plagued by poor quarterback play, numerous injuries to key players (particularly losing starting tackle Andrew Thomas to a Lisfranc injury), and poor pass protection similar to the previous season. Additionally, starting quarterback Daniel Jones was benched and eventually released mid-season due to his poor performance. The 14 losses were the most losses of any Giants season, surpassing 2017 and 2021. Their .176 winning percentage was their worst since 1974. Despite that, one of the few bright spots for the Giants was their Week 17 home win against the Indianapolis Colts, which prevented the Giants from going winless at home and eliminated the Colts from playoff contention.

== Offseason ==
=== Free agency ===
==== Players with the New York Giants in 2023 ====
Position	Player	Tag	Date signed	2024 team	Notes
RB	Saquon Barkley	UFA	March 13	Philadelphia Eagles	3 years, $37.75 million
G	Ben Bredeson	UFA	March 15	Tampa Bay Buccaneers	1 year, $3 million
RB	Matt Breida	UFA	March 17	New York Giants	
LB	Cam Brown	UFA	April 17	Miami Dolphins	1 year, $1.29 million
K	Randy Bullock	UFA	June 24	New York Giants	
TE	Lawrence Cager	RFA	March 15		1 year, $1.05 million
WR	Parris Campbell	UFA	March 21	Philadelphia Eagles	1 year, $1.29 million
LB	Carter Coughlin	UFA	March 14		1 year, $1.29 million
LB	Jarrad Davis	UFA			
G	Wyatt Davis	RFA	June 7	Cleveland Browns	1 year, $1.12 million
QB	Jacob Eason	ERFA			
C	Sean Harlow	UFA	August 3	Miami Dolphins	1 year, $1.12 million
C	J. C. Hassenauer	UFA			
WR	Isaiah Hodgins	RFA	March 24		1 year, $1.03 million
CB	Darnay Holmes	UFA	March 22		1 year, $2 million
CB	Adoree' Jackson	UFA	August 31		1 year
LS	Casey Kreiter	UFA	March 13		1 year, $1.37 million
G	Shane Lemieux	UFA	April 30	New Orleans Saints	1 year, $1.05 million
CB	Nick McCloud	RFA	Tendered March 13; Signed April 15		1 year, $2.98 million
S	Xavier McKinney	UFA	March 14	Green Bay Packers	4 years, $67 million
WR	Gunner Olszewski	UFA	March 14		1 year, $1.29 million
OT	Matt Peart	UFA	March 20	Denver Broncos	1 year, $1.29 million
OT	Tyre Phillips	UFA			
G	Justin Pugh	UFA			
DE	A'Shawn Robinson	UFA	March 13	Carolina Panthers	3 years, $22.5 million
WR	Sterling Shepard	UFA	June 10	Tampa Bay Buccaneers	1 year, $1.37 million
LB	Isaiah Simmons	UFA	April 5		1 year, $2 million
QB	Tyrod Taylor	UFA	March 14	New York Jets	2 years, $12 million
OLB	Benton Whitley	ERFA	March 13		1 year, $985,000

Player re-signed by the Giants	Player signed by another team	Retired

==== Players with other teams in 2023 ====
Position	Player	Tag	Date signed	2023 team	Contract
LB	Matthew Adams	UFA	April 12	Cleveland Browns	1 year, $1.29 million
WR	Miles Boykin	UFA	April 9	Pittsburgh Steelers	1 year, $1.29 million
OT	Jermaine Eluemunor	UFA	March 14	Las Vegas Raiders	2 years, $14 million
FB	Jakob Johnson	FA	August 16	Las Vegas Raiders	1 year, $1.12 million
QB	Drew Lock	UFA	March 14	Seattle Seahawks	1 year, $5 million
CB	David Long Jr.	UFA	May 1	Green Bay Packers	1 year, $1.12 million
TE	Chris Manhertz	FA	March 16	Denver Broncos	1 year, $1.37 million
WR	Isaiah McKenzie	UFA	March 14	Indianapolis Colts	1 year, $1.37 million
RB	Dante Miller	FA	April 5	Did not play	3 years, $2.69 million
S	Jalen Mills	UFA	March 14	New England Patriots	1 year, $1.37 million
OT	Matt Nelson	UFA	March 22	Detroit Lions	1 year, $1.29 million
NT	Jordan Phillips	UFA	April 11	Buffalo Bills	1 year, $1.79 million
WR	Allen Robinson	FA	May 9	Pittsburgh Steelers	1 year, $1.41 million
G	Jon Runyan Jr.	UFA	March 14	Green Bay Packers	3 years, $30 million
C	Austin Schlottmann	UFA	March 18	Minnesota Vikings	2 years, $2.79 million
RB	Devin Singletary	UFA	March 14	Houston Texans	3 years, $16.5 million
G	Aaron Stinnie	UFA	March 18	Tampa Bay Buccaneers	1 year, $1.29 million
TE	Jack Stoll	UFA	March 15	Philadelphia Eagles	1 year, $1.1 million

==== Trades ====
Position	Player	Date signed	Previous team	Trade details	Note
LB	Brian Burns	March 13	Carolina Panthers	Carolina received: Second- and fifth-round selections (39th and 141st) and 2025 fifth-round selection NY Giants received: LB Brian Burns; Fifth-round selection (166th)	New contract: 5 years, $141 million

=== Roster transactions ===
Position	Player	Date	Details
G	Mark Glowinski	March 4	Released
TE	Tyree Jackson	August 16	Waived/injured
TE	Darren Waller	June 10	Retired

=== Draft ===
2024 New York Giants draft selections
Round	Selection	Player	Position	College	Notes
1	6	Malik Nabers	WR	LSU	
2	39	Traded to the Carolina Panthers (Note: The Giants traded second- and fifth-round selections (39th and 141st overall) and a 2025 fifth-round selection to the Carolina Panthers in exchange for a fifth-round selection (166th overall) and LB Brian Burns.)			
2	47	Tyler Nubin	S	Minnesota	From Seahawks (Note: The Giants traded DE Leonard Williams to the Seattle Seahawks in exchange for a second-round selection (47th overall) and a 2025 fifth-round selection.)
3	70	Andru Phillips	CB	Kentucky	
4	107	Theo Johnson	TE	Penn State	
5	141	Traded to the Carolina Panthers			
5	166	Tyrone Tracy Jr.	RB	Purdue	From 49ers via Panthers
6	183	Darius Muasau	LB	UCLA	
7	226	Traded to the Arizona Cardinals (Note: The Giants traded a seventh-round selection (226th overall) to Arizona Cardinals in exchange for LB Isaiah Simmons.)			

2024 New York Giants undrafted free agents
Name	Position	College	Ref.
Ayir Asante	WR	Wyoming	
John Jiles	WR	West Florida	
Alex Johnson	CB	UCLA	
Marcellus Johnson	OT	Missouri	
Jake Kubas	G	North Dakota State	
Jude McAtamney	K	Rutgers (IPPP)	
Ovie Oghoufo	DE	LSU	
Casey Rogers	DE	Oregon	
Elijah Chatman	DT	SMU	

Draft trades

== Staff ==
2024 New York Giants staff
Front office: President/CEO – John Mara; Chairman/executive vice president – Steve Tisch; Senior vice president & general manager – Joe Schoen; Assistant general manager – Brandon Brown; Senior vice president of football operations & strategy – Kevin Abrams; Senior personnel consultant – Chris Mara; Director of player personnel – Tim McDonnell; Assistant director of player personnel – Dennis Hickey; Director of pro scouting – Chris Rosetti; Assistant director of pro scouting – Nick La Testa; Director of football operations – Ed Triggs; Director of coaching operations – Laura Young; Head coaches: Head coach – Brian Daboll; Assistant head coach/offensive coordinator – Mike Kafka; Offensive coaches: Quarterbacks/passing game coordinator – Shea Tierney; Assistant quarterbacks – Christian Jones; Running backs – Joel Thomas; Wide receivers – Mike Groh; Tight ends – Tim Kelly; Offensive line – Carmen Bricillo; Assistant offensive line – James Ferentz; Offensive assistant/game manager – Cade Knox; Offensive assistant – Christian Daboll; Offensive assistant – Angela Baker	Defensive coaches: Defensive coordinator – Shane Bowen; Defensive line – Andre Patterson; Assistant defensive line – Bryan Cox; Outside linebackers – Charlie Bullen; Inside linebackers – John Egorugwu; Defensive backs/passing game coordinator – Jerome Henderson; Safeties – Michael Treier; Assistant secondary coach – Mike Adams; Defensive assistant – Ben Burress; Defensive assistant – Zak Kuhr; Special teams coaches: Special teams coordinator – Michael Ghobrial; Assistant special teams – Cam Achord; Assistant special teams – Stephen Thomas; Strength and conditioning: Executive director of player performance – Aaron Wellman; Director of strength and conditioning – Frank Piraino; Assistant director of strength and conditioning – Drew Wilson; Performance manager/assistant strength and performance – Sam Coad

== Final roster ==
2024 New York Giants roster
Quarterbacks (QB): 12 Tim Boyle; 15 Tommy DeVito; 2 Drew Lock; Running backs (RB): 20 Eric Gray; 25 Dante Miller; 26 Devin Singletary; 29 Tyrone Tracy Jr.; Wide receivers (WR): 88 Bryce Ford-Wheaton; 13 Jalin Hyatt; 1 Malik Nabers; 17 Wan'Dale Robinson; 86 Darius Slayton; 87 Ihmir Smith-Marsette; Tight ends (TE): 82 Daniel Bellinger; 89 Greg Dulcich; 85 Chris Manhertz	Offensive linemen (OL): 72 Jermaine Eluemunor LT; 75 Joshua Ezeudu LT; 70 Chris Hubbard RT; 63 Jake Kubas LG; 73 Evan Neal RT; 65 Austin Schlottmann C; 61 John Michael Schmitz C; 64 Aaron Stinnie RG; 74 Greg Van Roten RG; Defensive linemen (DL): 94 Elijah Chatman DE; 69 Cory Durden NT; 90 Elijah Garcia DE; 93 Rakeem Nuñez-Roches DE; 95 Jordon Riley DE	Linebackers (LB): 49 Matthew Adams ILB; 0 Brian Burns OLB; 45 Tomon Fox OLB; 54 Dyontae Johnson ILB; 41 Micah McFadden ILB; 53 Darius Muasau ILB; 47 Ty Summers ILB; 5 Kayvon Thibodeaux OLB; Defensive backs (DB): 3 Deonte Banks CB; 24 Dane Belton SS; 28 Cor'Dale Flott CB; 35 Art Green CB; 21 Adoree' Jackson CB; 23 Anthony Johnson Jr. FS; 22 Andru Phillips CB; 27 Jason Pinnock FS; 19 Isaiah Simmons SS; 30 Greg Stroman CB; 33 Dee Williams CB; 39 Divaad Wilson CB; Special teams (ST): 9 Graham Gano K; 6 Jamie Gillan P; 59 Casey Kreiter LS	Practice squad: 55 Boogie Basham OLB; 66 Ross Blacklock DE; 36 Ekow Boye-Doe CB; 38 Alex Cook S; 52 Carter Coughlin ILB; 34 Azizi Hearn CB; 18 Isaiah Hodgins WR; 60 Bryan Hudson C; 81 Kearis Jackson WR; 71 Marcellus Johnson RT; 67 Ricky Lee LT; 99 Jude McAtamney K (IPP); 68 Jalen McKenzie RT; 77 Joshua Miles RT; -- Jimmy Morrissey C; 83 Jordan Murray TE; 79 Tyre Phillips LT; 91 Casey Rogers DE; Reserve: 98 DJ Davidson NT; 37 Tre Hawkins CB; 96 Timmy Horne NT; 57 Patrick Johnson OLB (IR); 84 Theo Johnson TE; 97 Dexter Lawrence NT; 43 Raheem Layne FS; 31 Tyler Nubin SS; 51 Azeez Ojulari OLB; 58 Bobby Okereke ILB; 80 Gunner Olszewski WR; 34 Elijah Riley FS; 76 Jon Runyan Jr. LG; 34 Jonathan Sutherland S (IR); 78 Andrew Thomas LT (IR); 96 Armon Watts DT; Rookies in italics 53 active, 16 reserve, 15 practice squad (3 exempt)

== Preseason ==
Week	Date	Opponent	Result	Record	Venue	Recap
1	August 8	Detroit Lions	W 14–3	1–0	MetLife Stadium	Recap
2	August 17	at Houston Texans	L 10–28	1–1	NRG Stadium	Recap
3	August 24	at New York Jets	L 6–10	1–2	MetLife Stadium	Recap

== Regular season ==
=== Schedule ===
Week	Date	Opponent	Result	Record	Venue	Recap
1	September 8	Minnesota Vikings	**L** 6–28	0–1	MetLife Stadium	Recap
2	September 15	at **Washington Commanders**	**L** 18–21	0–2	Northwest Stadium	Recap
3	September 22	at Cleveland Browns	**W** 21–15	1–2	Huntington Bank Field	Recap
4	September 26	**Dallas Cowboys**	**L** 15–20	1–3	MetLife Stadium	Recap
5	October 6	at Seattle Seahawks	**W** 29–20	2–3	Lumen Field	Recap
6	October 13	Cincinnati Bengals	**L** 7–17	2–4	MetLife Stadium	Recap
7	October 20	**Philadelphia Eagles**	**L** 3–28	2–5	MetLife Stadium	Recap
8	October 28	at Pittsburgh Steelers	**L** 18–26	2–6	Acrisure Stadium	Recap
9	November 3	**Washington Commanders**	**L** 22–27	2–7	MetLife Stadium	Recap
10	November 10	at Carolina Panthers	**L** 17–20 (OT)	2–8	(Germany) Allianz Arena (Munich)	Recap
11	Bye					
12	November 24	Tampa Bay Buccaneers	**L** 7–30	2–9	MetLife Stadium	Recap
13	November 28	at **Dallas Cowboys**	**L** 20–27	2–10	AT&T Stadium	Recap
14	December 8	New Orleans Saints	**L** 11–14	2–11	MetLife Stadium	Recap
15	December 15	Baltimore Ravens	**L** 14–35	2–12	MetLife Stadium	Recap
16	December 22	at Atlanta Falcons	**L** 7–34	2–13	Mercedes-Benz Stadium	Recap
17	December 29	Indianapolis Colts	**W** 45–33	3–13	MetLife Stadium	Recap
18	January 5	at **Philadelphia Eagles**	**L** 13–20	3–14	Lincoln Financial Field	Recap

Note: Intra-division opponents are in bold text.

=== Game summaries ===
==== Week 1: vs. Minnesota Vikings ====
Week 1: Minnesota Vikings at New York Giants – game summary

Quarter	1	2	3	4	Total
**Vikings**	7	7	14	0	**28**
Giants	3	0	3	0	**6**

at MetLife Stadium, East Rutherford, New Jersey

- Date: September 8
- Game time: 1:00 p.m. EDT
- Game weather: A few clouds, 64 °F (18 °C)
- Game attendance: 81,908
- Referee: Alex Kemp (55)
- TV announcers (Fox): Kenny Albert, Jonathan Vilma and Megan Olivi
- Recap, Game Book

Game information

**First quarter**

- NYG – Graham Gano 23-yard field goal, 7:16. Giants 3–0. **Drive: 7 plays, 15 yards, 4:07.**
- MIN – Aaron Jones 3-yard run (Will Reichard kick), 3:50. Vikings 7–3. **Drive: 5 plays, 65 yards, 3:26.**

**Second quarter**

- MIN – Justin Jefferson 3-yard pass from Sam Darnold (Will Reichard kick), 6:55. Vikings 14–3. **Drive: 11 plays, 99 yards, 6:44.**

**Third quarter**

- MIN – Jalen Nailor 21-yard pass from Sam Darnold (Will Reichard kick), 12:08. Vikings 21–3. **Drive: 6 plays, 70 yards, 2:52.**
- NYG – Graham Gano 50-yard field goal, 6:08. Vikings 21–6. **Drive: 11 plays, 39 yards, 6:00.**
- MIN – Andrew Van Ginkel 10-yard interception return (Will Reichard kick), 4:22. Vikings 28–6.

**Fourth quarter**

- No scoring plays.

**Top passers**

- MIN – Sam Darnold – 19/24, 208 yards, 2 TD, INT
- NYG – Daniel Jones – 22/42, 186 yards, 2 INT

**Top rushers**

- MIN – Aaron Jones – 14 rushes, 94 yards, TD
- NYG – Devin Singletary – 10 rushes, 37 yards

**Top receivers**

- MIN – Justin Jefferson – 4 receptions, 59 yards, TD
- NYG – Malik Nabers – 5 receptions, 66 yards

The Giants opened their 100th season with red uniforms inspired by their 1927, 1934, and 1938 championship teams, but played more like the teams of the 1960s and 1970s. Graham Gano got the Giants on the board first after rookie cornerback Andru Phillips forced a fumble. From that point it was all Vikings. Adoree' Jackson was flagged for a controversial pass interference on a third and long, setting up the Vikings first touchdown. The Vikings went on a 99-yard drive capped by a Justin Jefferson touchdown to take a 14–3 halftime lead.

The second half wasn't much better for the Giants. The Vikings opened the third quarter with a touchdown drive to make it 21–3, then Daniel Jones threw a screen pass that Andrew Van Ginkel intercepted at the line of scrimmage and walked in for a touchdown. The Vikings won 28–6.

Jones struggled in his first start since his ACL tear 10 months prior and finished with a 44.3 passer rating. Linebacker Darius Muasau had an interception in his NFL debut.

==== Week 2: at Washington Commanders ====
Week 2: New York Giants at Washington Commanders – game summary

Quarter	1	2	3	4	Total
Giants	6	6	0	6	**18**
**Commanders**	3	6	6	6	**21**

at Northwest Stadium, Landover, Maryland

- Date: September 15
- Game time: 1:00 p.m. EDT
- Game weather: Sunny, 82 °F (28 °C)
- Game attendance: 61,841
- Referee: Scott Novak
- TV announcers (Fox): Chris Myers, Mark Schlereth and Jen Hale
- Recap, Game Book

Game information

**First quarter**

- WAS – Austin Seibert 27-yard field goal, 5:24. Commanders 3–0. **Drive: 16 plays, 64 yards, 9:36.**
- NYG – Devin Singletary 7-yard run (kick failed, wide right), 1:06. Giants 6–3. **Drive: 7 plays, 53 yards, 4:18.**

**Second quarter**

- WAS – Austin Seibert 45-yard field goal, 10:37. Tied 6–6. **Drive: 10 plays, 43 yards, 5:29.**
- WAS – Austin Seibert 26-yard field goal, 1:50. Commanders 9–6. **Drive: 14 plays, 74 yards, 6:26.**
- NYG – Malik Nabers 4-yard pass from Daniel Jones (pass failed), 0:08. Giants 12–9. **Drive: 10 plays, 69 yards, 1:42.**

**Third quarter**

- WAS – Austin Seibert 27-yard field goal, 7:58. Tied 12–12. **Drive: 9 plays, 56 yards, 4:51.**
- WAS – Austin Seibert 29-yard field goal, 2:47. Commanders 15–12. **Drive: 9 plays, 59 yards, 4:38.**

**Fourth quarter**

- NYG – Wan'Dale Robinson 7-yard pass from Daniel Jones (pass failed), 11:32. Giants 18–15. **Drive: 13 plays, 70 yards, 6:15.**
- WAS – Austin Seibert 33-yard field goal, 7:12. Tied 18–18. **Drive: 9 plays, 45 yards, 4:20.**
- WAS – Austin Seibert 30-yard field goal, 0:00. Commanders 21–18. **Drive: 8 plays, 65 yards, 2:04.**

**Top passers**

- NYG – Daniel Jones – 16/28, 178 yards, 2 TD
- WAS – Jayden Daniels – 23/29, 226 yards

**Top rushers**

- NYG – Devin Singletary – 16 rushes, 95 yards, TD
- WAS – Brian Robinson Jr. – 17 rushes, 133 yards

**Top receivers**

- NYG – Malik Nabers – 10 receptions, 127 yards, TD
- WAS – Zach Ertz – 4 receptions, 62 yards

Unlike the previous game, quarterback Daniel Jones excelled by throwing for 178 yards, 2 touchdowns, no interceptions, and completed 57.1% of his passes to go with his 100 passer rating. Even then, he could not succeed at helping the Giants win. After kicker Graham Gano suffered an injury on the opening kickoff, the Giants became the first team since the 1989 Los Angeles Rams to lose a game after scoring three touchdowns and allowing none, and the first to do so in regulation. Except for the kneel down to end the first half, the Commanders ended all of their possessions with Austin Seibert field goals.

Malik Nabers scored his first NFL touchdown in the second quarter, but had a critical fourth-down drop late in the fourth quarter to give the Commanders the ball back, leading to the eventual game-winning kick by Seibert as time expired. Head coach Brian Daboll was heavily criticized for not signing a second kicker and undermanning the Giants for being unable to kick extra points and field goals that could have changed the outcome of the game.

==== Week 3: at Cleveland Browns ====
Week 3: New York Giants at Cleveland Browns – game summary

Quarter	1	2	3	4	Total
**Giants**	7	14	0	0	**21**
Browns	7	0	0	8	**15**

at Huntington Bank Field, Cleveland, Ohio

- Date: September 22
- Game time: 1:00 p.m. EDT
- Game weather: Cloudy, 76 °F (24 °C)
- Game attendance: 68,016
- Referee: Craig Wrolstad
- TV announcers (Fox): Kenny Albert, Jonathan Vilma and Megan Olivi
- Recap, Game Book

Game information

**First quarter**

- CLE – Amari Cooper 24-yard pass from Deshaun Watson (Dustin Hopkins kick), 14:49. Browns 7–0. **Drive: 1 play, 24 yards, 0:06.**
- NYG – Devin Singletary 1-yard run (Greg Joseph kick), 2:07. Tied 7–7. **Drive: 13 plays, 81 yards, 7:44.**

**Second quarter**

- NYG – Malik Nabers 3-yard pass from Daniel Jones (Greg Joseph kick), 1:44. Giants 14–7. **Drive: 14 plays, 93 yards, 6:51.**
- NYG – Malik Nabers 5-yard pass from Daniel Jones (Greg Joseph kick), 0:11. Giants 21–7. **Drive: 4 plays, 30 yards, 0:21.**

**Third quarter**

- No scoring plays.

**Fourth quarter**

- CLE – Amari Cooper 6-yard pass from Deshaun Watson (Deshaun Watson–Jerry Jeudy pass), 11:33. Giants 21–15. **Drive: 5 plays, 49 yards, 2:07.**

**Top passers**

- NYG – Daniel Jones – 24/34, 236 yards, 2 TD
- CLE – Deshaun Watson – 21/37, 196 yards, 2 TD

**Top rushers**

- NYG – Devin Singletary – 16 rushes, 65 yards, TD
- CLE – Jerome Ford – 10 rushes, 37 yards

**Top receivers**

- NYG – Malik Nabers – 8 receptions, 78 yards, 2 TD
- CLE – Amari Cooper – 7 receptions, 86 yards, 2 TD

Eric Gray fumbled the opening kickoff, and Deshaun Watson found Amari Cooper on the first play from scrimmage to give the Browns a 7–0 lead 11 seconds into the game. Staring down the possibility of an 0–3 start, the Giants found their composure and their pass rush got to Watson, sacking him eight times during the game.

On the Giants second drive Daniel Jones threw an interception that was negated by a roughing the passer penalty. After that play, the offense immediately got going and tied the game on a Devin Singletary 1-yard touchdown run. In the second quarter, Malik Nabers took over, snatching a deep ball from a defender, then capped the drive off with an acrobatic touchdown catch to give the Giants a 14–7 lead. On the Browns next drive, Brian Burns made his first impact play as a Giant, strip-sacking Watson with to give the Giants the ball back with 32 seconds left in the half. Nabers scored his second touchdown of the quarter 4 plays later, and the Giants went into the locker room with a 21–7 halftime lead to a stunned Browns crowd.

Singletary fumbled again on the Giants second half opening half drive, but the Browns couldn't capitalize on the field position. Safety Jason Pinnock sacked Watson on the next drive, and Dustin Hopkins missed the ensuing field goal attempt. The Giants offense stalled for the rest of the game, and the Browns took advantage of a short field on a fourth-quarter drive; Watson connected with Cooper for his second touchdown of the game, and Jerry Jeudy hauled in the two-point conversion to make the score 21–15 Giants. However, the Giants defense buckled down, forcing a fumble and two fourth-down stops on the Browns last third drives. Singletary had a lane to score at the end, but kneeled down at the 1-yard line to run out the clock. The Giants won 21–15 and improved to 1–2. Daniel Jones improved further from the previous two games, throwing for 236 yards, 2 touchdowns, no interceptions, and completed 70.6% of his passes to go with his 109.4 passer rating.

==== Week 4: vs. Dallas Cowboys ====
Week 4: Dallas Cowboys at New York Giants – game summary

Quarter	1	2	3	4	Total
**Cowboys**	7	7	3	3	**20**
Giants	3	6	3	3	**15**

at MetLife Stadium, East Rutherford, New Jersey

- Date: September 26
- Game time: 8:15 p.m. EDT
- Game weather: Overcast, 74 °F (23 °C)
- Game attendance: 80,425
- Referee: Clay Martin
- TV announcers (WNYW/Prime Video): Al Michaels, Kirk Herbstreit and Kaylee Hartung
- Recap, Game Book

Game information

**First quarter**

- NYG – Greg Joseph 52-yard field goal, 9:03. Giants 3–0. **Drive: 8 plays, 51 yards, 4:43.**
- DAL – Rico Dowdle 15-yard pass from Dak Prescott (Brandon Aubrey kick), 2:06. Cowboys 7–3. **Drive: 12 plays, 75 yards, 6:57.**

**Second quarter**

- NYG – Greg Joseph 41-yard field goal, 11:11. Cowboys 7–6. **Drive: 11 plays, 55 yards, 5:55.**
- DAL – CeeDee Lamb 55-yard pass from Dak Prescott (Brandon Aubrey kick), 9:16. Cowboys 14–6. **Drive: 5 plays, 70 yards, 1:55.**
- NYG – Greg Joseph 38-yard field goal, 1:06. Cowboys 14–9. **Drive: 15 plays, 52 yards, 8:10.**

**Third quarter**

- NYG – Greg Joseph 22-yard field goal, 8:42. Cowboys 14–12. **Drive: 11 plays, 77 yards, 6:18.**
- DAL – Brandon Aubrey 60-yard field goal, 5:06. Cowboys 17–12. **Drive: 8 plays, 28 yards, 3:36.**

**Fourth quarter**

- NYG – Greg Joseph 42-yard field goal, 11:11. Cowboys 17–15. **Drive: 10 plays, 28 yards, 4:20.**
- DAL – Brandon Aubrey 40-yard field goal, 6:54. Cowboys 20–15. **Drive: 10 plays, 48 yards, 4:17.**

**Top passers**

- DAL – Dak Prescott – 22/27, 221 yards, 2 TD
- NYG – Daniel Jones – 29/40, 281 yards, INT

**Top rushers**

- DAL – Rico Dowdle – 11 rushes, 46 yards
- NYG – Devin Singletary – 14 rushes, 24 yards

**Top receivers**

- DAL – CeeDee Lamb – 7 receptions, 98 yards, TD
- NYG – Malik Nabers – 12 receptions, 115 yards

The fans were treated to a penalty-filled game, with 11 being called on the Cowboys. On the Giants opening drive, while in field goal range, tight end Daniel Bellinger was inexplicably called for a facemask penalty while replay showed it was his facemask being grabbed. On the Cowboys first touchdown of the game, the referees picked up a holding penalty on tight end Jake Ferguson despite him grabbing a Giants defender, paving the lane for Rico Dowdle to score.

The Giants moved the ball well, but failed to get in the end zone, instead settling for five field goals, and lost an anticlimactic affair 20–15.

Malik Nabers, despite finishing for 12 receptions and 115 yards receiving, suffered a concussion late in the fourth quarter. Running back Devin Singletary also got hurt in the loss. Daniel Jones' performance was a drop off from his previous two, by throwing no touchdowns, an interception, and completed 72.5% of his passes to go with his 81.4 passer rating.

==== Week 5: at Seattle Seahawks ====
Week 5: New York Giants at Seattle Seahawks – game summary

Quarter	1	2	3	4	Total
**Giants**	0	10	10	9	**29**
Seahawks	7	3	3	7	**20**

at Lumen Field, Seattle, Washington

- Date: October 6
- Game time: 4:25 p.m. EDT/1:25 p.m. PDT
- Game weather: Mostly Sunny, 61 °F (16 °C)
- Game attendance: 68,306
- Referee: Shawn Smith
- TV announcers (CBS): Andrew Catalon, Tiki Barber, Jason McCourty and A.J. Ross
- Recap, Game Book

Game information

**First quarter**

- SEA – Rayshawn Jenkins 102 yard fumble return for touchdown (Jason Myers kick), 2:33. Seahawks 7–0. **Drive: 16 plays, 79 yards, 10:01.**

**Second quarter**

- NYG – Wan'Dale Robinson 7-yard pass from Daniel Jones (Greg Joseph kick), 9:09. Tied 7–7. **Drive: 8 plays, 81 yards, 4:26.**
- NYG – Greg Joseph 38-yard field goal, 0:22. Giants 10–7. **Drive: 12 plays, 58 yards, 5:12.**
- SEA – Jason Myers 43-yard field goal, 0:02. Tied 10–10. **Drive: 3 plays, 45 yards, 0:20.**

**Third quarter**

- NYG – Darius Slayton 30-yard pass from Daniel Jones (Greg Joseph kick), 10:41. Giants 17–10. **Drive: 4 plays, 77 yards, 1:30.**
- SEA – Jason Myers 48-yard field goal, 6:33. Giants 17–13. **Drive: 8 plays, 41 yards, 4:08.**
- NYG – Greg Joseph 31-yard field goal, 0:46. Giants 20–13. **Drive: 11 plays, 60 yards, 5:47.**

**Fourth quarter**

- NYG – Greg Joseph 24-yard field goal, 11:54. Giants 23–13. **Drive: 6 plays, 21 yards, 2:15.**
- SEA – Jaxon Smith-Njigba 5-yard pass from Geno Smith (Jason Myers kick), 2:09. Giants 23–20. **Drive: 14 plays, 95 yards, 3:44.**
- NYG – Blocked field goal returned 60 yards by Bryce Ford-Wheaton, 0:55. Giants 29–20.

**Top passers**

- NYG – Daniel Jones – 23/34, 257 yards, 2 TD
- SEA – Geno Smith – 28/40, 284 yards, TD

**Top rushers**

- NYG – Tyrone Tracy Jr. – 18 rushes, 129 yards
- SEA – Geno Smith – 4 rushes, 72 yards

**Top receivers**

- NYG – Darius Slayton – 8 receptions, 122 yards, TD
- SEA – Tyler Lockett – 4 receptions, 75 yards

Before the game, wide receiver Malik Nabers and running back Devin Singletary were ruled out of the contest. Running back Eric Gray got the starting nod and had 3 receptions on the opening drive, but fumbled on 4th-and-goal, which Seahawks safety Rayshawn Jenkins recovered in the end zone and returned it untouched for a 101-yard touchdown for Seattle. Gray thought he crossed the plane, but the ruling on the field was a fumble and stood upon review. Rookie Tyrone Tracy Jr. stepped in and gave the Giants offense life in the second quarter. Daniel Jones found Wan'Dale Robinson on a 7-yard pass to tie the game at 7–7. Despite the Giants outgaining the Seahawks 220–90 at halftime, both teams were tied 10–10.

On the Seahawks opening drive of the third quarter, Deonte Banks stripped DK Metcalf in field goal range, and Jones immediately responded with two deep balls to Darius Slayton, the latter a 30-yard touchdown to take a 17–10 lead. In the fourth quarter and leading 20–13, Brian Burns sacked Geno Smith and the Giants took a two-score, 23–13 lead with time slipping in the fourth quarter. The Seahawks found rhythm on a late fourth quarter drive capped off with a Jaxon Smith-Njigba touchdown and then forced a three-and-out to get the ball back with 1:40 to play. On the first play of the drive, Smith ran for 32 yards to put the Seahawks in field goal range to tie the game. On the field goal attempt, Isaiah Simmons jumped over the A-gap without making contact with the long snapper, blocked the kick, and wide receiver Bryce Ford-Wheaton recovered the ball and ran untouched for a Giants touchdown, sealing the 29–20 victory. This was the first time a Giants player scored a touchdown during a blocked field goal on special teams since Janoris Jenkins in 2016.

The Giants defense had 7 sacks of Smith, and their 22 sacks through 5 weeks were the most in the NFL. Tyrone Tracy finished with 129 rushing yards after taking over for Gray. Darius Slayton had 8 receptions for 122 receiving yards and a touchdown.

After the game, Brian Daboll revealed that Special Teams coach Michael Ghobrial drew up the blitz for the game-winning field goal block on Tuesday and waited until all game to use that play for the first time. Isaiah Simmons received the game ball and was named the NFC Special Teams Player of the Week for his performance.

Daniel Jones threw 257 yards, 2 touchdowns, no interceptions, and completed 67.6% of his passes to go with his 109.6 passer rating, his third triple-digit passer rating performance in four weeks.

However, this would turn out to be the final win for Daniel Jones as a Giant, as he was released during the team's bye week following their Week 10 loss to Carolina, in the midst of a franchise-worst 10-game losing streak for the Giants.

==== Week 6: vs. Cincinnati Bengals ====
Week 6: Cincinnati Bengals at New York Giants – game summary

Quarter	1	2	3	4	Total
**Bengals**	7	0	3	7	**17**
Giants	0	0	7	0	**7**

at MetLife Stadium, East Rutherford, New Jersey

- Date: October 13
- Game time: 8:20 p.m. EDT
- Game weather: Fair, 63 °F (17 °C)
- Game attendance: 78,809
- Referee: Carl Cheffers
- TV announcers (NBC): Mike Tirico, Cris Collinsworth and Melissa Stark
- Recap, Game Book

Game information

**First quarter**

- CIN – Joe Burrow 47-yard run (Evan McPherson kick), 11:32. Bengals 7–0. **Drive: 8 plays, 69 yards, 3:28.**

**Second quarter**

- No scoring plays.

**Third quarter**

- NYG – Tyrone Tracy Jr. 1-yard run (Greg Joseph kick), 5:48. Tied 7–7. **Drive: 16 plays, 79 yards, 6:45.**
- CIN – Evan McPherson 37-yard field goal, 0:41. Bengals 10–7. **Drive: 9 plays, 51 yards, 5:07.**

**Fourth quarter**

- CIN – Chase Brown 30-yard run (Evan McPherson kick), 1:52. Bengals 17–7. **Drive: 5 plays, 64 yards, 1:09.**

**Top passers**

- CIN – Joe Burrow – 19/28, 208 yards
- NYG – Daniel Jones – 22/41, 205 yards, INT

**Top rushers**

- CIN – Joe Burrow – 4 rushes, 57 yards, TD
- NYG – Daniel Jones – 11 rushes, 56 yards

**Top receivers**

- CIN – Tee Higgins – 7 receptions, 77 yards
- NYG – Darius Slayton – 6 receptions, 57 yards

Despite the Bengals coming into the game with the 31st-ranked defense in the NFL, the Giants offense struggled mightily for much of the night. The only score in the first half came from a Joe Burrow 47-yard touchdown run on 3rd-and-18.

In the third quarter, rookie running back Tyrone Tracy Jr. managed to score his first career touchdown to tie the game at 7–7, which also happened to be the first touchdown the Giants had scored at home all season. However, the Giants missed more opportunities to score, which included two missed field goals by kicker Greg Joseph, the second of which sealed the game. Daniel Jones had his worst performance since Week 1 by throwing no touchdowns, an interception, and completed just 53.7% of his passes to go with his 57.5 passer rating.

The Giants recorded their first home loss to the Bengals.

==== Week 7: vs. Philadelphia Eagles ====
Week 7: Philadelphia Eagles at New York Giants – game summary

Quarter	1	2	3	4	Total
**Eagles**	0	14	7	7	**28**
Giants	0	3	0	0	**3**

at MetLife Stadium, East Rutherford, New Jersey

- Date: October 20
- Game time: 1:00 p.m. EDT
- Game weather: Sunny, 72 °F (22 °C)
- Game attendance: 82,779
- Referee: Tra Blake
- TV announcers (Fox): Chris Myers, Mark Sanchez and Kristina Pink
- Recap, Game Book

Game information

**First quarter**

- No scoring plays.

**Second quarter**

- PHI – Saquon Barkley 3-yard run (Jake Elliott kick), 8:58. Eagles 7–0. **Drive: 5 plays, 74 yards, 2:34.**
- PHI – A. J. Brown 41-yard pass from Jalen Hurts (Jake Elliott kick), 4:27. Eagles 14–0. **Drive: 6 plays, 58 yards, 2:23.**
- NYG – Greg Joseph 38-yard field goal, 0:05. Eagles 14–3. **Drive: 10 plays, 39 yards, 1:36.**

**Third quarter**

- PHI – Jalen Hurts 1-yard run (Jake Elliott kick), 7:03. Eagles 21–3. **Drive: 10 plays, 77 yards, 4:47.**

**Fourth quarter**

- PHI – Jalen Hurts 1-yard run (Jake Elliott kick), 11:26. Eagles 28–3. **Drive: 10 plays, 92 yards, 6:07.**

**Top passers**

- PHI – Jalen Hurts – 10/14, 114 yards, TD
- NYG – Daniel Jones – 14/21, 99 yards

**Top rushers**

- PHI – Saquon Barkley – 17 rushes, 176 yards, TD
- NYG – Tyrone Tracy Jr. – 6 rushes, 23 yards

**Top receivers**

- PHI – A. J. Brown – 5 receptions, 89 yards, TD
- NYG – Malik Nabers – 4 receptions, 41 yards

In Saquon Barkley's first game against his former team, he made his presence felt. Despite a defensive battle through the first quarter and a half, with the first seven drives combined between both teams ending in punts, Barkley broke through with a 55-yard run to put the Eagles in the red zone. He then scored a 3-yard rushing touchdown to cap off the drive and put the Eagles up 7–0.

This proved to be more than enough to beat the Giants as they were held out of the end zone for the third time in four home games. At the end of the first half, Daniel Jones was able to connect with rookie tight end Theo Johnson for a touchdown, but it was nullified due to Johnson being penalized for offensive pass interference. The Giants then had to settle for a field goal and entered halftime trailing 14–3.

It didn't get any better in the second half as the Giants went three-and-out on three of their six offensive drives in the half. Daniel Jones was benched early in the fourth quarter for Drew Lock, who wasn't able to get anything going on offense either. The Giants lost their fourth consecutive home game to start the season.

==== Week 8: at Pittsburgh Steelers ====
Week 8: New York Giants at Pittsburgh Steelers – game summary

Quarter	1	2	3	4	Total
Giants	3	6	0	9	**18**
**Steelers**	6	3	7	10	**26**

at Acrisure Stadium, Pittsburgh, Pennsylvania

- Date: October 28
- Game time: 8:15 p.m. EDT
- Game weather: Clear, 54 °F (12 °C)
- Game attendance: 66,637
- Referee: Scott Novak
- TV announcers (ESPN/ABC): Joe Buck, Troy Aikman and Lisa Salters
- Recap, Game Book

Game information

**First quarter**

- PIT – Chris Boswell 31-yard field goal, 10:19. Steelers 3–0. **Drive: 10 plays, 57 yards, 4:41.**
- NYG – Greg Joseph 29-yard field goal, 5:19. Tied 3–3. **Drive: 8 plays, 59 yards, 5:00.**
- PIT – Chris Boswell 25-yard field goal, 3:05. Steelers 6–3. **Drive: 7 plays, 63 yards, 2:14.**

**Second quarter**

- NYG – Greg Joseph 39-yard field goal, 12:39. Tied 6–6. **Drive: 12 plays, 45 yards, 5:26.**
- PIT – Chris Boswell 27-yard field goal, 8:12. Steelers 9–6. **Drive: 12 plays, 61 yards, 4:27.**
- NYG – Greg Joseph 44-yard field goal, 0:21. Tied 9–9. **Drive: 8 plays, 57 yards, 1:32.**

**Third quarter**

- PIT – Calvin Austin 73-yard punt return (Chris Boswell kick), 4:38. Steelers 16–9. **Drive: 3 plays, −7 yards, 2:57.**

**Fourth quarter**

- PIT – Calvin Austin 29-yard pass from Russell Wilson (Chris Boswell kick), 13:16. Steelers 23–9. **Drive: 9 plays, 80 yards, 4:12.**
- NYG – Tyrone Tracy Jr. 45-yard run (pass failed), 11:07. Steelers 23–15. **Drive: 5 plays, 55 yards, 2:09.**
- PIT – Chris Boswell 27-yard field goal, 7:15. Steelers 26–15. **Drive: 7 plays, 61 yards, 3:52.**
- NYG – Greg Joseph 48-yard field goal, 5:06. Steelers 26–18. **Drive: 8 plays, 40 yards, 2:09.**

**Top passers**

- NYG – Daniel Jones – 24/38, 264 yards, INT
- PIT – Russell Wilson – 20/28, 278 yards, TD

**Top rushers**

- NYG – Tyrone Tracy Jr. – 20 rushes, 145 yards, TD
- PIT – Najee Harris – 19 rushes, 114 yards

**Top receivers**

- NYG – Darius Slayton – 4 receptions, 108 yards
- PIT – George Pickens – 4 receptions, 74 yards

In a penalty-ridden game for both teams, touchdowns were hard to come by until the third quarter, when Calvin Austin returned a punt 73 yards to the house for the Steelers. A total of three touchdowns were negated by penalties: two for the Steelers and one for the Giants. The Giants were penalized 11 times for 65 yards.

Tyrone Tracy Jr. scored the only Giants touchdown on a 45-yard run early in the fourth quarter. However, the ensuing two-point conversion attempt failed miserably as Nabers was hit immediately by Alex Highsmith while being targeted behind the line of scrimmage, as none of the Giants' blockers that were lined up in a swinging gate formation moved when the ball was snapped, allowing Highsmith to run through them and get to Nabers.

The Giants had two final chances to try to tie the game but turned the ball over both times. First, Daniel Jones was strip-sacked by T. J. Watt and then on their next drive, Jones threw an interception to rookie cornerback Beanie Bishop to officially seal the win for Pittsburgh.

The Giants lost their third consecutive game and fell to 2–6. For the seventh time in the last eight seasons, the Giants started 2–6 or worse in their first eight games.

==== Week 9: vs. Washington Commanders ====
Week 9: Washington Commanders at New York Giants – game summary

Quarter	1	2	3	4	Total
**Commanders**	7	14	3	3	**27**
Giants	0	7	3	12	**22**

at MetLife Stadium, East Rutherford, New Jersey

- Date: November 3
- Game time: 1:00 p.m. EST
- Game weather: Fair, 52 °F (11 °C)
- Game attendance: 77,994
- Referee: Brad Allen
- TV announcers (Fox): Chris Myers, Mark Sanchez and Kristina Pink
- Recap, Game Book

Game information

**First quarter**

- WAS – Terry McLaurin 1-yard pass from Jayden Daniels (Austin Seibert kick), 7:04. Commanders 7–0. **Drive: 3 plays, 31 yards, 1:11.**

**Second quarter**

- NYG – Chris Manhertz 2-yard pass from Daniel Jones (Jude McAtamney kick), 12:21. Tied 7–7. **Drive: 16 plays, 73 yards, 9:43.**
- WAS – Austin Ekeler 1-yard run (Austin Seibert kick), 6:21. Commanders 14–7. **Drive: 11 plays, 70 yards, 6:00.**
- WAS – Terry McLaurin 18-yard pass from Jayden Daniels (Austin Seibert kick), 0:06. Commanders 21–7. **Drive: 12 plays, 87 yards, 5:13.**

**Third quarter**

- NYG – Jude McAtamney 31-yard field goal, 5:27. Commanders 21–10. **Drive: 15 plays, 66 yards, 8:37.**
- WAS – Austin Seibert 31-yard field goal, 0:33. Commanders 24–10. **Drive: 10 plays, 57 yards, 4:54.**

**Fourth quarter**

- NYG – Daniel Jones 2-yard run (run failed), 9:25. Commanders 24–16. **Drive: 13 plays, 80 yards, 6:08.**
- WAS – Austin Seibert 20-yard field goal, 3:46. Commanders 27–16. **Drive: 11 plays, 63 yards, 5:39.**
- NYG – Theo Johnson 35-yard pass from Daniel Jones (pass failed), 2:48. Commanders 27–22. **Drive: 4 plays, 74 yards, 0:58.**

**Top passers**

- WAS – Jayden Daniels – 15/22, 209 yards, 2 TD
- NYG – Daniel Jones – 20/26, 174 yards, 2 TD

**Top rushers**

- WAS – Chris Rodriguez Jr. – 11 rushes, 52 yards
- NYG – Tyrone Tracy Jr. – 16 rushes, 66 yards

**Top receivers**

- WAS – Noah Brown – 5 receptions, 60 yards
- NYG – Malik Nabers – 9 receptions, 59 yards

On the Giants' second drive of the game, they managed to run the ball effectively against Washington. However, Daniel Jones fumbled while the Giants were in field goal range and Bobby Wagner recovered the ball, taking it deep into Giants territory. Initially it had been ruled an incomplete pass, but Washington challenged it successfully, overturning the call. Several plays after the turnover, Jayden Daniels connected with Terry McLaurin in the end zone to give Washington the lead.

Right after, the Giants went on a 16-play touchdown drive, which consumed nearly 10 minutes. Jones connected with tight end Chris Manhertz for a 2-yard touchdown to end the drive. This was the first passing touchdown for Daniel Jones at MetLife Stadium since Week 17 of the 2022 season. Even though the Giants managed to tie the game, the Commanders scored two more touchdowns before halftime, leading 21–7.

In the fourth quarter, Daniel Jones attempted to mount a comeback for the Giants, scoring his first rushing touchdown at MetLife since Week 17 in 2022 as well. He also managed to throw another touchdown to rookie tight end Theo Johnson for his first career touchdown. However, the Giants defense failed to stop the Commanders and get off the field on the next drive, officially ending the game.

This is the first time since the 2021 season that the Giants got swept by Washington, and only the third time since 2011. Additionally, this is the first time the Giants lost to all three divisional opponents at home in the same season since 2018.

Despite the loss, Daniel Jones had one of his best outings by throwing 2 touchdowns, no interceptions, and completed 76.9% of his passes to go with his 119.7 passer rating. Even then, he could not succeed at helping the Giants win.

==== Week 10: at Carolina Panthers ====
NFL Germany games

Week 10: New York Giants at Carolina Panthers – game summary

Quarter	1	2	3	4	OT	Total
Giants	0	0	7	10	0	**17**
**Panthers**	7	3	7	0	3	**20**

at Allianz Arena, Munich, Bavaria, Germany

- Date: November 10
- Game time: 3:30 p.m. CET/9:30 a.m. EST
- Game weather: Mostly cloudy, 40 °F (4 °C)
- Game attendance: 70,132
- Referee: Shawn Hochuli
- TV announcers (WABC/NFLN): Rich Eisen, Kurt Warner, Jamie Erdahl and Sarah Walsh
- Recap, Game Book

Game information

**First quarter**

- CAR – Ja'Tavion Sanders 5-yard pass from Bryce Young (Eddy Piñeiro kick), 7:48. Panthers 7–0. **Drive: 8 plays, 90 yards, 4:00.**

**Second quarter**

- CAR – Eddy Piñeiro 53-yard field goal, 14:55. Panthers 10–0. **Drive: 10 plays, 56 yards, 5:44.**

**Third quarter**

- NYG – Tyrone Tracy Jr. 32-yard run (Graham Gano kick), 8:54. Panthers 10–7. **Drive: 10 plays, 65 yards, 6:06.**
- CAR – Chuba Hubbard 1-yard run (Eddy Piñeiro kick), 3:33. Panthers 17–7. **Drive: 10 plays, 80 yards, 5:21.**

**Fourth quarter**

- NYG – Daniel Jones 2-yard run (Graham Gano kick), 8:33. Panthers 17–14. **Drive: 13 plays, 96 yards, 6:58.**
- NYG – Graham Gano 42-yard field goal, 0:05. Tied 17–17. **Drive: 12 plays, 55 yards, 2:18.**

**Overtime**

- CAR – Eddy Piñeiro 36-yard field goal, 7:56. Panthers 20–17. **Drive: 4 plays, 5 yards, 1:56.**

**Top passers**

- NYG – Daniel Jones – 22/37, 190 yards, 2 INT
- CAR – Bryce Young – 15/25, 126 yards, TD

**Top rushers**

- NYG – Tyrone Tracy Jr. – 18 rushes, 103 yards, TD
- CAR – Chuba Hubbard – 28 rushes, 153 yards, TD

**Top receivers**

- NYG – Wan'Dale Robinson – 5 receptions, 51 yards
- CAR – Jalen Coker – 3 receptions, 41 yards

The Giants traveled to Munich to play their first ever game in Germany, and fourth international game overall, dating back to 2007.

Daniel Jones turned the ball over in the red zone twice and got sacked on a flea-flicker play in which he had two wide-open receivers, in what proved to be his final start as a Giant.

Despite the miscues, the Giants managed to tie the game at 17–17 heading into overtime. Although the Giants won the coin toss, Tyrone Tracy Jr. fumbled on the first play from scrimmage, giving the Panthers the ball in field goal range. A few plays later, Eddy Piñeiro kicked the game-winning field goal to hand the Giants their fifth consecutive loss.

This was the first ever international loss for the Giants. Their previous three international games had all been in London, where they remain unbeaten.

Following the game, and during the team's bye week, Daniel Jones was benched in favor of Tommy DeVito. Drew Lock initially remained the second-string quarterback to his disappointment, but he ended up starting five of the seven remaining games in the season due to DeVito getting injured and performing ineffectively. Additionally, the Giants named Tim Boyle their third-string quarterback.

Shortly after, Daniel Jones was officially released, ending his tenure in New York. Through six seasons with the Giants, he finished with a career record of 24–44–1 as a starter, and a postseason record of 1–1.

==== Week 12: vs. Tampa Bay Buccaneers ====
Week 12: Tampa Bay Buccaneers at New York Giants – game summary

Quarter	1	2	3	4	Total
**Buccaneers**	7	16	7	0	**30**
Giants	0	0	0	7	**7**

at MetLife Stadium, East Rutherford, New Jersey

- Date: November 24
- Game time: 1:00 p.m. EST
- Game weather: Mostly cloudy, 50 °F (10 °C)
- Game attendance: 77,554
- Referee: Adrian Hill
- TV announcers (CBS): Andrew Catalon, Tiki Barber, Jason McCourty, and A.J. Ross
- Recap, Game Book

Game information

**First quarter**

- TB – Sean Tucker 1-yard run (Chase McLaughlin kick), 6:37. Buccaneers 7–0. **Drive: 14 plays, 70 yards, 8:23.**

**Second quarter**

- TB – Chase McLaughlin 23-yard field goal, 12:03. Buccaneers 10–0. **Drive: 6 plays, 33 yards, 2:58.**
- TB – Bucky Irving 6-yard run (Chase McLaughlin kick), 6:23. Buccaneers 17–0. **Drive: 7 plays, 82 yards, 3:41.**
- TB – Baker Mayfield 10-yard run (kick failed, wide left), 0:12. Buccaneers 23–0. **Drive: 9 plays, 86 yards, 2:45.**

**Third quarter**

- TB – Rachaad White 1-yard run (Chase McLaughlin kick), 3:45. Buccaneers 30–0. **Drive: 12 plays, 95 yards, 7:10.**

**Fourth quarter**

- NYG – Devin Singletary 1-yard run (Graham Gano kick), 11:28. Buccaneers 30–7. **Drive: 13 plays, 68 yards, 7:17.**

**Top passers**

- TB – Baker Mayfield – 24/30, 294 yards
- NYG – Tommy DeVito – 21/31, 189 yards

**Top rushers**

- TB – Bucky Irving – 12 rushes, 87 yards, TD
- NYG – Tyrone Tracy Jr. – 9 rushes, 42 yards

**Top receivers**

- TB – Mike Evans – 5 receptions, 68 yards
- NYG – Malik Nabers – 6 receptions, 64 yards

The Giants played their first game without Daniel Jones starting, as he was released during their bye week. Tommy DeVito made his first start of the season, but the Giants couldn't get anything going on offense until garbage time in the fourth quarter, when Devin Singletary managed to score his first touchdown since Week 3. Tyrone Tracy Jr. fumbled again for the second straight game, this time a costly fumble in the red zone, which took more points off the board.

Defensively the Giants could not stop the Buccaneers at all, as they ran the ball with great ease all day. The Giants defense went their tenth consecutive game without recording an interception, having not gotten one since rookie linebacker Darius Muasau did during their Week 1 loss to the Vikings. This ties the 2017 Oakland Raiders for the longest streak in NFL regular season history without recording a defensive interception.

With the loss, the Giants not only failed to clinch the NFC East for the 13th year in a row, but they've also secured a 0–6 record at home for the first time since 1974.

==== Week 13: at Dallas Cowboys ====
Thanksgiving Day games

Week 13: New York Giants at Dallas Cowboys – game summary

Quarter	1	2	3	4	Total
Giants	7	3	0	10	**20**
**Cowboys**	3	10	14	0	**27**

at AT&T Stadium, Arlington, Texas

- Date: November 28
- Game time: 4:30 p.m. EST/3:30 p.m. CST
- Game weather: None (retractable roof closed)
- Game attendance: 92,196
- Referee: Brad Rogers
- TV announcers (Fox): Kevin Burkhardt, Tom Brady, Erin Andrews and Tom Rinaldi
- Recap, Game Book

Game information

**First quarter**

- DAL – Brandon Aubrey 23-yard field goal, 9:43. Cowboys 3–0. **Drive: 11 plays, 65 yards, 5:17.**
- NYG – Tyrone Tracy Jr. 1-yard run (Graham Gano kick), 3:06. Giants 7–3. **Drive: 13 plays, 70 yards, 6:37.**

**Second quarter**

- DAL – Brandon Aubrey 33-yard field goal, 11:44. Giants 7–6. **Drive: 13 plays, 55 yards, 6:22.**
- DAL – DeMarvion Overshown 23-yard interception return (Brandon Aubrey kick), 11:29. Cowboys 13–7.
- NYG – Graham Gano 46-yard field goal, 3:21. Cowboys 13–10. **Drive: 4 plays, 1 yard, 1:51.**

**Third quarter**

- DAL – Brandin Cooks 2-yard pass from Cooper Rush (Brandon Aubrey kick), 11:37. Cowboys 20–10. **Drive: 6 plays, 38 yards, 2:03.**
- DAL – Rico Dowdle 4-yard run (Brandon Aubrey kick), 4:23. Cowboys 27–10. **Drive: 9 plays, 70 yards, 4:59.**

**Fourth quarter**

- NYG – Graham Gano 47-yard field goal, 13:34. Cowboys 27–13. **Drive: 10 plays, 41 yards, 5:49.**
- NYG – Drew Lock 8-yard run (Graham Gano kick), 2:18. Cowboys 27–20. **Drive: 8 plays, 80 yards, 2:21.**

**Top passers**

- NYG – Drew Lock – 21/32, 178 yards, INT
- DAL – Cooper Rush – 21/36, 195 yards, TD

**Top rushers**

- NYG – Drew Lock – 4 rushes, 57 yards, TD
- DAL – Rico Dowdle – 22 rushes, 112 yards, TD

**Top receivers**

- NYG – Malik Nabers – 8 receptions, 69 yards
- DAL – KaVontae Turpin – 4 receptions, 53 yards

This game averaged 38.8 million viewers, making it the fourth most-watched Thanksgiving Day game on record as well as the fifth most-watched NFL regular season game on record, dating back to 1988.

Prior to the game, it was announced that Tommy DeVito had injured his forearm during the Buccaneers game, meaning Drew Lock got his first start as a Giant.

During the Giants opening drive, Drew Lock managed to escape the pocket during a blitz on 3rd-and-6 from the Dallas 29-yard line, breaking free and appearing to run all the way to the end zone for a touchdown. Upon review, it was determined that Lock had stepped out-of-bounds at the 1-yard line, but on the next play, Tyrone Tracy Jr. ran the ball in to put the Giants up 7–3. This marked the first time the Giants had held a lead during a game since Week 5 against Seattle. This was also the first time the Giants had scored a touchdown on their opening drive since Week 2 against Washington.

Despite the strong start, the Giants offense then struggled for most of the remaining game. On the first play of their second drive, Drew Lock threw a pick-six to Cowboys linebacker DeMarvion Overshown, giving the Cowboys a 13–7 lead that they did not relinquish. Then on the opening drive of the second half, Lock fumbled, with Overshown recovering the ball. This gave Dallas great field position, and they capitalized, scoring their first offensive touchdown of the game to go up 20–10.

In the fourth quarter down 27–13, the Giants managed to put together a much-needed touchdown drive, with Drew Lock scoring on an 8-yard run, pulling the game to 27–20. The Giants had a chance to get the ball back and tie the game by stopping the Cowboys, but on 3rd-and-2 right after the two-minute warning, Cooper Rush connected with Brandin Cooks to pick up a first down, allowing the Cowboys to kneel down and end the game since the Giants were out of timeouts.

The Giants lost their seventh straight game to fall to 2–10 and lost their eighth straight to Dallas dating back to 2021, and it resulted in them being the first team eliminated from playoff contention.

The Giants defense also set an NFL regular season record by going their 11th straight game without recording an interception. Their lone interception on the season happened during their Week 1 loss to Minnesota.

After the loss, it was revealed that both Theo Johnson and Dexter Lawrence would miss the remainder of the season, suffering a Lisfranc foot injury and dislocated left elbow respectively.

==== Week 14: vs. New Orleans Saints ====
Week 14: New Orleans Saints at New York Giants – game summary

Quarter	1	2	3	4	Total
**Saints**	7	0	7	0	**14**
Giants	0	3	0	8	**11**

at MetLife Stadium, East Rutherford, New Jersey

- Date: December 8
- Game time: 1:00 p.m. EST
- Game weather: Fair, 54 °F (12 °C)
- Game attendance: 76,143
- Referee: Clete Blakeman
- TV announcers (Fox): Kevin Kugler, Daryl Johnston and Laura Okmin
- Recap, Game Book

Game information

**First quarter**

- NO – Kendre Miller 8-yard run (Blake Grupe kick), 1:19. Saints 7–0. **Drive: 9 plays, 98 yards, 5:11.**

**Second quarter**

- NYG – Graham Gano 43-yard field goal, 11:20. Saints 7–3. **Drive: 7 plays, 26 yards, 2:42.**

**Third quarter**

- NO – Juwan Johnson 11-yard pass from Derek Carr (Blake Grupe kick), 3:40. Saints 14–3. **Drive: 9 plays, 69 yards, 4:41.**

**Fourth quarter**

- NYG – Tyrone Tracy Jr. 1-yard run (Drew Lock–Malik Nabers pass), 4:11. Saints 14–11. **Drive: 13 plays, 82 yards, 6:03.**

**Top passers**

- NO – Derek Carr – 20/31, 219 yards, TD, INT
- NYG – Drew Lock – 21/49, 227 yards, INT

**Top rushers**

- NO – Alvin Kamara – 17 rushes, 44 yards
- NYG – Drew Lock – 5 rushes, 59 yards

**Top receivers**

- NO – Marquez Valdes-Scantling – 4 receptions, 51 yards
- NYG – Malik Nabers – 5 receptions, 79 yards

Drew Lock started the game with eight consecutive incomplete passes, the first quarterback to do so since Cam Newton in 2017.

Even though the Giants defense managed to hold the Saints to 14 points, the Giants offense was very anemic until the fourth quarter. Down 14–3, the Giants went on a six-minute, 13-play drive, which was capped off by a Tyrone Tracy Jr. rushing touchdown. On the ensuing two-point conversion attempt, Malik Nabers was able to catch a tipped pass from Drew Lock and cross the plane, bringing the score to 14–11. This was the first successful two-point conversion attempt for the Giants all season, having been unsuccessful in their first six tries.

The Giants had a chance to score a field goal and tie the game to force overtime on their final drive, but Graham Gano's attempt was blocked, sealing their eighth straight loss (the team's longest losing streak since 2019), and falling to 2–11.

During the loss, the Giants recorded their first defensive interception since week 1, courtesy of cornerback Tre Hawkins, although it was later announced that he had suffered a season-ending back injury in this game. This ended the longest streak in NFL regular season history at 11 games without an interception.

Before the game, around 11 a.m. ET, in response to the team's poor season, a plane flew over MetLife Stadium towing a banner that read "Mr. Mara, enough. Please fix this dumpster fire!"

==== Week 15: vs. Baltimore Ravens ====
Week 15: Baltimore Ravens at New York Giants – game summary

Quarter	1	2	3	4	Total
**Ravens**	7	14	7	7	**35**
Giants	0	7	0	7	**14**

at MetLife Stadium, East Rutherford, New Jersey

- Date: December 15
- Game time: 1:00 p.m. EST
- Game weather: Fair, 36 °F (2 °C)
- Game attendance: 77,455
- Referee: Brad Allen
- TV announcers (CBS): Andrew Catalon, Tiki Barber, Jason McCourty and A.J. Ross
- Recap, Game Book

Game information

**First quarter**

- BAL – Mark Andrews 13-yard pass from Lamar Jackson (Justin Tucker kick), 3:18. Ravens 7–0. **Drive: 6 plays, 33 yards, 3:29.**

**Second quarter**

- BAL – Rashod Bateman 49-yard pass from Lamar Jackson (Justin Tucker kick), 10:53. Ravens 14–0. **Drive: 5 plays, 70 yards, 2:55.**
- NYG – Devin Singletary 2-yard run (Graham Gano kick), 2:15. Ravens 14–7. **Drive: 13 plays, 80 yards, 8:38.**
- BAL – Rashod Bateman 20-yard pass from Lamar Jackson (Justin Tucker kick), 0:32. Ravens 21–7. **Drive: 9 plays, 80 yards, 1:43.**

**Third quarter**

- BAL – Devontez Walker 21-yard pass from Lamar Jackson (Justin Tucker kick), 4:01. Ravens 28–7. **Drive: 12 plays, 86 yards, 6:38.**

**Fourth quarter**

- BAL – Justice Hill 27-yard pass from Lamar Jackson (Justin Tucker kick), 10:46. Ravens 35–7. **Drive: 9 plays, 97 yards, 4:07.**
- NYG – Malik Nabers 9-yard pass from Tim Boyle (Graham Gano kick), 6:36. Ravens 35–14. **Drive: 10 plays, 70 yards, 4:10.**

**Top passers**

- BAL – Lamar Jackson – 21/25, 290 yards, 5 TD
- NYG – Tim Boyle – 12/24, 123 yards, TD, INT

**Top rushers**

- BAL – Derrick Henry – 14 rushes, 67 yards
- NYG – Tyrone Tracy Jr. – 10 rushes, 31 yards

**Top receivers**

- BAL – Rashod Bateman – 3 receptions, 80 yards, 2 TD
- NYG – Malik Nabers – 10 receptions, 82 yards, TD

Tommy DeVito was reinstated as the starting quarterback for this game after it was reported that Drew Lock had suffered a heel injury and was in a walking boot following the previous game. Lock was listed as the third-string emergency quarterback for this game. However, DeVito suffered a concussion right before halftime, meaning quarterback Tim Boyle made his first appearance as a Giant.

Despite getting great starting field position on their opening drive, the Ravens coughed up the ball on the second play from scrimmage with a Lamar Jackson fumble, and an Adoree' Jackson fumble recovery. However, the Giants offense failed to capitalize on the turnover, going three-and-out. After the two teams exchanged punts, Baltimore marched down the field, with tight end Mark Andrews scoring a touchdown to give the Ravens the lead. From that point on, the Ravens offense completely dominated the game.

In the second quarter, the Giants were able to manufacture a 13-play touchdown drive aided by numerous Baltimore penalties, including multiple penalties for pass interference. Devin Singletary capped off the drive with a touchdown to put the Giants on the board.

In the fourth quarter, on another penalty-ridden drive for the Baltimore defense, Tim Boyle connected with Malik Nabers on a 4th-and-3 from the 23-yard line to score the second Giants touchdown of the day, although the game was well out of reach at that point. This was the first touchdown for Nabers since Week 3, and his first career touchdown at MetLife Stadium. Furthermore, this was the first passing touchdown for the Giants since Week 9.

Despite benefiting from 12 accepted penalties against the Ravens, the Giants were blasted 35–14, losing their ninth straight game and falling to 0–8 at home.

For the second consecutive week, a plane flew over MetLife Stadium towing a banner. This time, the banner read, "Mr. Mara, enough. We won't stop until you fire everyone."

==== Week 16: at Atlanta Falcons ====
Week 16: New York Giants at Atlanta Falcons – game summary

Quarter	1	2	3	4	Total
Giants	0	7	0	0	**7**
**Falcons**	0	17	14	3	**34**

at Mercedes-Benz Stadium, Atlanta, Georgia

- Date: December 22
- Game time: 1:00 p.m. EST
- Game weather: None (retractable roof closed)
- Game attendance: 70,404
- Referee: Tra Blake
- TV announcers (Fox): Kevin Kugler, Daryl Johnston and Laura Okmin
- Recap, Game Book

Game information

**First quarter**

- No scoring plays.

**Second quarter**

- NYG – Tyrone Tracy Jr. 2-yard pass from Drew Lock (Graham Gano kick), 14:53. Giants 7–0. **Drive: 14 plays, 70 yards, 8:12.**
- ATL – Riley Patterson 52-yard field goal, 10:36. Giants 7–3. **Drive: 8 plays, 36 yards, 4:17.**
- ATL – Jessie Bates 55-yard interception return (Riley Patterson kick), 7:56. Falcons 10–7.
- ATL – Bijan Robinson 4-yard run (Riley Patterson kick), 1:43. Falcons 17–7. **Drive: 9 plays, 86 yards, 3:26.**

**Third quarter**

- ATL – Matthew Judon 27-yard interception return (Riley Patterson kick), 14:20. Falcons 24–7.
- ATL – Bijan Robinson 2-yard run (Riley Patterson kick), 7:14. Falcons 31–7. **Drive: 12 plays, 69 yards, 6:17.**

**Fourth quarter**

- ATL – Riley Patterson 37-yard field goal, 10:47. Falcons 34–7. **Drive: 15 plays, 69 yards, 10:04.**

**Top passers**

- NYG – Drew Lock – 22/39, 210 yards, TD, 2 INT
- ATL – Michael Penix Jr. – 18/27, 202 yards, INT

**Top rushers**

- NYG – Tyrone Tracy Jr. – 7 rushes, 26 yards
- ATL – Bijan Robinson – 22 rushes, 94 yards, 2 TD

**Top receivers**

- NYG – Malik Nabers – 7 receptions, 68 yards
- ATL – Darnell Mooney – 5 receptions, 82 yards

Drew Lock was renamed the starter for this game after missing the previous week with a heel injury.

Similar to the Thanksgiving game against Dallas, the Giants had a strong touchdown drive to take the lead early but quickly fell apart afterwards. Just like he did in the Thanksgiving game, Lock followed the touchdown drive by throwing a pick-six on the very next possession, this time to Jessie Bates, giving Atlanta the lead for good. From that point on, it was all Falcons, who scored 34 unanswered points in the first career start for rookie quarterback Michael Penix Jr.

Lock threw another pick-six on the opening drive of the second half, becoming the first Giants quarterback since Eli Manning in 2007 to throw multiple pick-sixes in a game.

The lone bright spot was Malik Nabers breaking the record of 91 receptions for a Giants rookie shared by Odell Beckham Jr. and Saquon Barkley, finishing the game with 97 on the season.

With this loss, the Giants set a franchise record, losing 10 in a row for the first time in team history. The 13th loss in the season tied the 2017 and 2021 teams for the most losses in a single season. Furthermore, Brian Daboll became just the second Giants head coach to lose 13 games in a season, along with Joe Judge in 2021. (Ben McAdoo, who was the Giants' coach in 2017, only lost 10 games that year, as he was fired before the season ended). With the Raiders' win later that day, the Giants moved into the driver's seat for the first overall pick in the 2025 draft.

==== Week 17: vs. Indianapolis Colts ====
Week 17: Indianapolis Colts at New York Giants – game summary

Quarter	1	2	3	4	Total
Colts	3	10	7	13	**33**
**Giants**	7	14	7	17	**45**

at MetLife Stadium, East Rutherford, New Jersey

- Date: December 29
- Game time: 1:00 p.m. EST
- Game weather: Cloudy, 54 °F (12 °C)
- Game attendance: 73,164
- Referee: Bill Vinovich
- TV announcers (Fox): Kenny Albert, Jonathan Vilma and Megan Olivi
- Recap, Game Book

Game information

**First quarter**

- IND – Matt Gay 32-yard field goal, 3:45. Colts 3–0. **Drive: 10 plays, 50 yards, 5:43.**
- NYG – Malik Nabers 31-yard pass from Drew Lock (Graham Gano kick), 1:05. Giants 7–3. **Drive: 5 plays, 70 yards, 2:40.**

**Second quarter**

- NYG – Darius Slayton 32-yard pass from Drew Lock (Graham Gano kick), 11:32. Giants 14–3. **Drive: 5 plays, 56 yards, 2:07.**
- IND – Matt Gay 29-yard field goal, 9:26. Giants 14–6. **Drive: 7 plays, 59 yards, 2:06.**
- NYG – Wan'Dale Robinson 5-yard pass from Drew Lock (Graham Gano kick), 5:55. Giants 21–6. **Drive: 7 plays, 70 yards, 3:31.**
- IND – Jonathan Taylor 3-yard run (Matt Gay kick), 0:20. Giants 21–13. **Drive: 14 plays, 70 yards, 5:35.**

**Third quarter**

- NYG – Ihmir Smith-Marsette 100-yard kickoff return (Graham Gano kick), 14:48. Giants 28–13.
- IND – Jonathan Taylor 26-yard run (Matt Gay kick), 11:03. Giants 28–20. **Drive: 7 plays, 70 yards, 3:45.**

**Fourth quarter**

- IND – Alec Pierce 13-yard pass from Joe Flacco (pass failed), 10:53. Giants 28–26. **Drive: 6 plays, 61 yards, 2:52.**
- NYG – Malik Nabers 59-yard pass from Drew Lock (Graham Gano kick), 8:39. Giants 35–26. **Drive: 4 plays, 70 yards, 2:14.**
- IND – Michael Pittman Jr. 7-yard pass from Joe Flacco (Matt Gay kick), 6:38. Giants 35–33. **Drive: 5 plays, 70 yards, 2:01.**
- NYG – Drew Lock 5-yard run (Graham Gano kick), 2:57. Giants 42–33. **Drive: 9 plays, 70 yards, 3:41.**
- NYG – Graham Gano 30-yard field goal, 2:20. Giants 45–33. **Drive: 4 plays, 5 yards, 0:26.**

**Top passers**

- IND – Joe Flacco – 26/38, 330 yards, 2 TD, 2 INT
- NYG – Drew Lock – 17/23, 309 yards, 4 TD

**Top rushers**

- IND – Jonathan Taylor – 32 rushes, 125 yards, 2 TD
- NYG – Tyrone Tracy Jr. – 20 rushes, 59 yards

**Top receivers**

- IND – Alec Pierce – 6 receptions, 122 yards, TD
- NYG – Malik Nabers – 7 receptions, 171 yards, 2 TD

Facing the possibility of becoming the first team ever to lose nine home games in a season (since the NFL regular season was extended to 17 games in 2021), as well as finishing winless at home for the first time since 1974, the Giants had their best offensive game in years. Drew Lock had five total touchdowns, including two passing touchdowns to Malik Nabers, who became the first Giants rookie ever to record 100 receptions in a season, finishing the day with 104. Coincidentally, Nabers reached exactly 1,000 receiving yards on his first touchdown catch of the game. Tyrone Tracy Jr. also reached 1,000 scrimmage yards on the season during a 40-yard run on the same drive. Nabers and Tracy became just the third rookie duo in NFL history to each have 1,000 or more scrimmage yards in a season.

For the first time since Week 3 against Cleveland, the Giants entered halftime with the lead. On the opening kickoff of the second half, Ihmir Smith-Marsette returned the ball 100 yards to the house, becoming the first Giants kick returner to score a touchdown since Dwayne Harris in 2015. After both teams traded numerous touchdown drives in the second half, rookie cornerback Dru Phillips sealed the game with his first career interception late in the fourth quarter. Dane Belton intercepted a pass on the Colts' opening drive, making this the first and only game all season that the Giants defense recorded multiple interceptions. It was also their only home win in the 2024 season.

Despite the win, the Giants lost control of the first overall pick in the 2025 draft, holding the fourth overall pick at the end of the day.

The Giants scored their most points in a game since their famous 52–49 shootout loss to New Orleans in 2015 and scored more than 40 points at home for the first time since beating the Eagles 42–7 in week 17 of the 2012 season. Additionally, this was the first time the Giants scored 40 or more points in a game since the "Chase Young Bowl" against Washington in 2019, which also happened to be the last time a Giants quarterback had five total touchdowns (Daniel Jones). They improved to 3–13 and snapped a franchise record 10-game losing streak, while also eliminating the Colts from playoff contention. The Giants avoided finishing winless at home.

Drew Lock threw a career-high equaling four touchdown passes.

==== Week 18: at Philadelphia Eagles ====
Week 18: New York Giants at Philadelphia Eagles – game summary

Quarter	1	2	3	4	Total
Giants	0	0	3	10	**13**
**Eagles**	7	3	0	10	**20**

at Lincoln Financial Field, Philadelphia, Pennsylvania

- Date: January 5
- Game time: 1:00 p.m. EST
- Game weather: Clear, 31 °F (−1 °C)
- Game attendance: 69,879
- Referee: Ronald Torbert
- TV announcers (CBS): Andrew Catalon, Tiki Barber, Jason McCourty and A.J. Ross
- Recap, Game Book

Game information

**First quarter**

- PHI – Ainias Smith 15-yard pass from Tanner McKee (Jake Elliott kick), 6:51. Eagles 7–0. **Drive: 4 plays, 51 yards, 2:01.**

**Second quarter**

- PHI – Jake Elliott 24-yard field goal, 1:44. Eagles 10–0. **Drive: 13 plays, 59 yards, 5:07.**

**Third quarter**

- NYG – Graham Gano 25-yard field goal, 7:34. Eagles 10–3. **Drive: 10 plays, 58 yards, 5:47.**

**Fourth quarter**

- PHI – E. J. Jenkins 7-yard pass from Tanner McKee (Jake Elliott kick), 14:55. Eagles 17–3. **Drive: 7 plays, 61 yards, 3:52.**
- NYG – Malik Nabers 45-yard pass from Drew Lock (Graham Gano kick), 10:32. Eagles 17–10. **Drive: 8 plays, 70 yards, 4:23.**
- NYG – Graham Gano 53-yard field goal, 7:21. Eagles 17–13. **Drive: 4 plays, 3 yards, 1:32.**
- PHI – Jake Elliott 32-yard field goal, 0:47. Eagles 20–13. **Drive: 16 plays, 56 yards, 6:34.**

**Top passers**

- NYG – Drew Lock – 22/29, 138 yards, TD, INT
- PHI – Tanner McKee – 27/41, 269 yards, 2 TD

**Top rushers**

- NYG – Tyrone Tracy Jr. – 14 rushes, 59 yards
- PHI – Will Shipley – 10 rushes, 32 yards

**Top receivers**

- NYG – Malik Nabers – 5 receptions, 64 yards, TD
- PHI – Jahan Dotson – 7 receptions, 94 yards

In the fourth quarter, Malik Nabers scored his seventh touchdown of the season on a 45-yard strike from Drew Lock, the only Giants touchdown of the day. Nabers set a new Giants franchise record for most receptions in a season, finishing with 109. The previous record was held by Steve Smith, who had 107 receptions in 2009. Furthermore, Nabers' 109 receptions set an NFL record for rookie wide receivers and is second all-time to rookie tight end Brock Bowers of the Raiders, who coincidentally reached 118 later that day. (Puka Nacua of the Rams had 105 receptions in 2023, which was the previous high for rookie wide receivers).

With the loss to the arch-rival Eagles, the Giants finished 3–14, their most losses in a single season. Thus, Brian Daboll became the first Giants head coach to lose 14 games in a season. The Giants also got swept by every team in their division for the first time in franchise history and were additionally handed their 12th straight road loss to Philadelphia. With the Patriots win and the Browns and Titans losing, the Giants locked in the third pick in the 2025 draft.

The next day, amid speculation that either one or both of them could be fired, owner John Mara announced that both Daboll and General Manager Joe Schoen would be retained for the following season.

=== Standings ===
==== Division ====
NFC East
	W	L	T	PCT	DIV	CONF	PF	PA	STK
^{(2)} Philadelphia Eagles	14	3	0	.824	5–1	9–3	463	303	W2
^{(6)} Washington Commanders	12	5	0	.706	4–2	9–3	485	391	W5
Dallas Cowboys	7	10	0	.412	3–3	5–7	350	468	L2
New York Giants	3	14	0	.176	0–6	1–11	273	415	L1

==== Conference ====
NFC
Seed	Team	Division	W	L	T	PCT	DIV	CONF	SOS	SOV	STK
**Division leaders**
1	Detroit Lions	North	15	2	0	.882	6–0	11–1	.516	.494	W3
2	Philadelphia Eagles	East	14	3	0	.824	5–1	9–3	.453	.424	W2
3 (Note: Tampa Bay clinched the #3 seed over Los Angeles based on conference record. (Tampa Bay 8–4 to Los Angeles 6–6))	Tampa Bay Buccaneers	South	10	7	0	.588	4–2	8–4	.502	.465	W2
4 (Note: Los Angeles clinched the NFC West and #4 seed over Seattle based on strength of victory. (Los Angeles .441 to Seattle .424))	Los Angeles Rams	West	10	7	0	.588	4–2	6–6	.505	.441	L1
**Wild cards**
5	Minnesota Vikings	North	14	3	0	.824	4–2	9–3	.474	.408	L1
6	Washington Commanders	East	12	5	0	.706	4–2	9–3	.436	.358	W5
7	Green Bay Packers	North	11	6	0	.647	1–5	6–6	.533	.412	L2
**Did not qualify for the postseason**
8	Seattle Seahawks	West	10	7	0	.588	4–2	6–6	.498	.424	W2
9 (Note: Atlanta finished ahead of Arizona based on conference record. (Atlanta 7–5 to Arizona 4–8))	Atlanta Falcons	South	8	9	0	.471	4–2	7–5	.519	.426	L2
10	Arizona Cardinals	West	8	9	0	.471	3–3	4–8	.536	.404	W1
11	Dallas Cowboys	East	7	10	0	.412	3–3	5–7	.522	.387	L2
12	San Francisco 49ers	West	6	11	0	.353	1–5	4–8	.564	.402	L4
13 (Note: Chicago finished ahead of Carolina based on head-to-head victory.)	Chicago Bears	North	5	12	0	.294	1–5	3–9	.554	.388	W1
14 (Note: Carolina finished ahead of New Orleans based on strength of victory. (Carolina .329 to New Orleans .306))	Carolina Panthers	South	5	12	0	.294	2–4	4–8	.498	.329	W1
15	New Orleans Saints	South	5	12	0	.294	2–4	4–8	.505	.306	L4
16	New York Giants	East	3	14	0	.176	0–6	1–11	.554	.412	L1
**Tiebreakers** (Note: When breaking ties for three or more teams under the NFL's rules, they are first broken within divisions, then comparing only the highest ranked remaining team from each division.)
