= Tyrone Tracy Jr. =

American football player (born 1999)

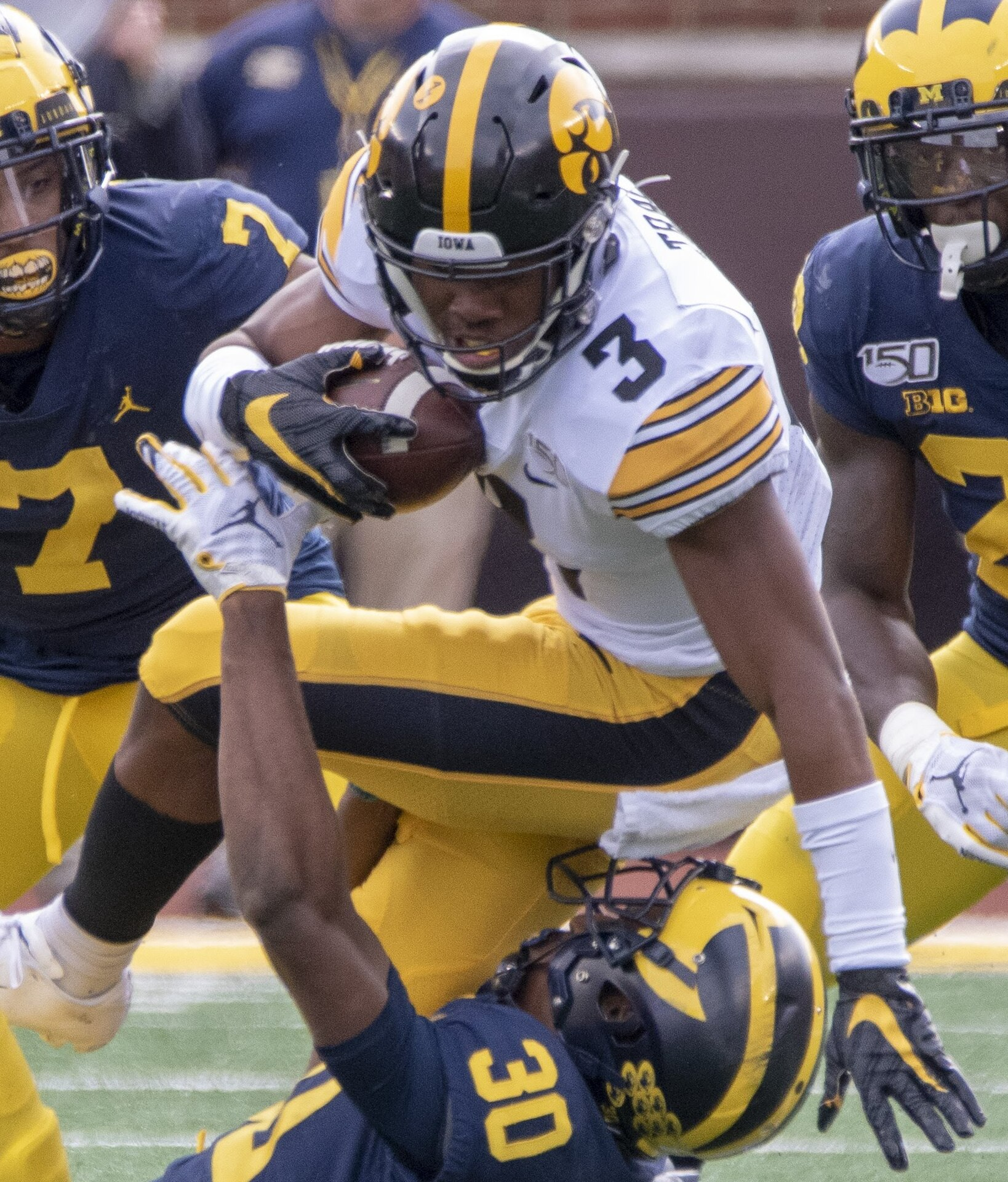
- Tracy at Iowa in 2019

No. 29 – New York Giants
- Positions: Running back, kick returner
- Roster status: Injured reserve

Personal information
- Born: November 23, 1999 (age 26); Indianapolis, Indiana, U.S.
- Listed height: 5 ft 11 in (1.80 m)
- Listed weight: 209 lb (95 kg)

Career information
- High school: Decatur Central (Indianapolis)
- College: Iowa (2018–2021); Purdue (2022–2023)
- NFL draft: 2024: 5th round, 166th overall pick

Career history
- New York Giants (2024–present)

Awards and highlights
- PFWA All-Rookie Team (2024); Third-team All-Big Ten (2023)

Career NFL statistics as of 2025
- Rushing yards: 1,579
- Rushing average: 4.3
- Rushing touchdowns: 7
- Receptions: 74
- Receiving yards: 572
- Receiving touchdowns: 3
- Return yards: 193
- Stats at Pro Football Reference

Tyrone Tracy Jr. (born November 23, 1999) is an American professional football running back for the New York Giants of the National Football League (NFL). He played college football for the Iowa Hawkeyes and Purdue Boilermakers.

== Early life ==
Tracy attended high school at Decatur Central in Indianapolis. In his senior season, he rushed for 1,412 yards and 13 touchdowns while also catching 54 passes for 1,132 yards and 16 touchdowns. Coming out of high school, Tracy was rated as a three-star recruit where he decided to commit to play college football for the Iowa Hawkeyes.

== College career ==
=== Iowa ===
During the 2019 season at the University of Iowa, Tracy notched 36 receptions for 589 yards and three touchdowns, while also adding one on the ground. During the COVID-shortened 2020 season, Tracy hauled in 14 receptions for 154 yards, and a touchdown. In the 2021 season, Tracy notched 15 receptions for 106 yards and a touchdown. After the conclusion of the 2021 season, Tracy decided to enter the NCAA transfer portal.

=== Purdue ===
Tracy decided to transfer to Purdue University to play for the Boilermakers. In the 2022 season, Tracy rushed 17 times for 138 yards while also adding 28 receptions for 198 yards. Heading into the 2023 season, Tracy decided to transition from a wide receiver to play running back for Purdue. In Week 5 of the 2023 season, Tracy rushed 21 times for 112 yards and a touchdown in a win against Illinois. In the 2023 season, Tracy would rush for 716 yards and eight touchdowns on 113 carries, while also making 19 catches for 132 yards. After the conclusion of the 2023 season, Tracy decided to declare for the 2024 NFL draft.

=== College statistics ===
Year	Team	Games	Rushing					Receiving				
Year	Team	Games	Att	Yds	Y/A	TD	Y/G	Rec	Yds	Y/R	TD	Y/G
2018	Iowa	4	1	-1	-1.0	0	-0.3	1	22	22.0	0	5.5
2019	Iowa	13	6	39	6.5	1	3.0	36	589	16.4	3	45.3
2020	Iowa	8	2	22	11.0	0	2.8	14	154	11.0	1	19.3
2021	Iowa	3	7	33	4.7	1	2.5	15	106	7.1	1	8.2
2022	Purdue	14	17	138	8.1	0	9.9	28	198	7.1	0	14.1
2023	Purdue	11	113	716	6.3	8	65.1	19	132	6.9	0	12.0
Career		63	146	947	6.5	10	15.0	113	1201	10.6	5	19.1

== Professional career ==
Pre-draft measurables
Height	Weight	Arm length	Hand span	Wingspan	40-yard dash	10-yard split	20-yard split	20-yard shuttle	Three-cone drill	Vertical jump	Broad jump	Bench press
5 ft 11 1/8 in (1.81 m)	209 lb (95 kg)	31 3/4 in (0.81 m)	9 1/8 in (0.23 m)	6 ft 4 5/8 in (1.95 m)	4.48 s	1.53 s	2.62 s	4.06 s	6.81 s	40.0 in (1.02 m)	10 ft 4 in (3.15 m)	20 reps
All values from NFL Combine/Pro Day

Tracy was selected by the New York Giants in the fifth round (166th overall) of the 2024 NFL draft. In Week 5 of the 2024 season against the Seattle Seahawks Tracy got his first start due to Devin Singletary being injured. Tracy had 18 carries for 129 yards and averaged 7.2 yards per carry.

When Singletary returned from his injury in Week 7, he and Tracy split backfield work relatively evenly, toting 5 and 6 carries each, respectively; Singletary also logged one reception on one target, whereas Tracy caught all three targets. From Week 8's game against the Steelers, however, Tracy had impressed the coaching staff – including head coach Brian Daboll – enough to become the starter and clear bell-cow back, logging 20 carries for 145 yards, whereas Singletary ran the ball only twice, despite being fully healthy. This pattern continued through at least the team's bye in Week 11.

In their game against the Carolina Panthers in Week 10, Tracy lost a crucial fumble in overtime that allowed the Panthers to kick the game winning field goal. On December 29, 2024, during the Week 17 game against Indianapolis Colts Tracy and Malik Nabers became the 3rd rookie duo in NFL history to each record 1,000 yards from scrimmage. He finished the 2024 season with 192 carries for 839 rushing yards and five rushing touchdowns to go with 38 receptions for 284 receiving yards and one receiving touchdown. He was named to the PFWA All-Rookie Team.

Tracy started the 2025–26 NFL season as RB1 following a breakout rookie year. In Week 3, in a matchup against the Kansas City Chiefs, Tracy caught a swing pass in the left flat near the 50-yard line and collided with defensive back Jaylen Watson, suffering a dislocated shoulder in his right arm Tracy returned in Week 6 with a more reduced role, and rookie running back Cam Skattebo taking over the starting position.

== NFL career statistics ==
Legend
**Bold**	Career high

Year	Team	Games		Rushing					Receiving					Kick returns					Fumbles	
Year	Team	GP	GS	Att	Yds	Avg	Lng	TD	Rec	Yds	Avg	Lng	TD	Ret	Yds	Avg	Lng	TD	Fum	Lost
2024	NYG	17	12	**192**	**839**	**4.4**	**45**	**5**	**38**	284	7.5	19	1	3	61	20.3	28	0	**5**	**2**
2025	NYG	15	11	176	740	4.2	31	2	36	**288**	**8.0**	**42**	**2**	**5**	**132**	**26.4**	**30**	0	1	1
Career		32	23	368	1,579	4.3	45	7	74	572	7.7	42	3	8	193	24.1	30	0	6	3

== Personal life ==
His younger brother, Javon Tracy, is a wide receiver for the Minnesota Golden Gophers.
