= Casey Kreiter =

American football player (born 1990)

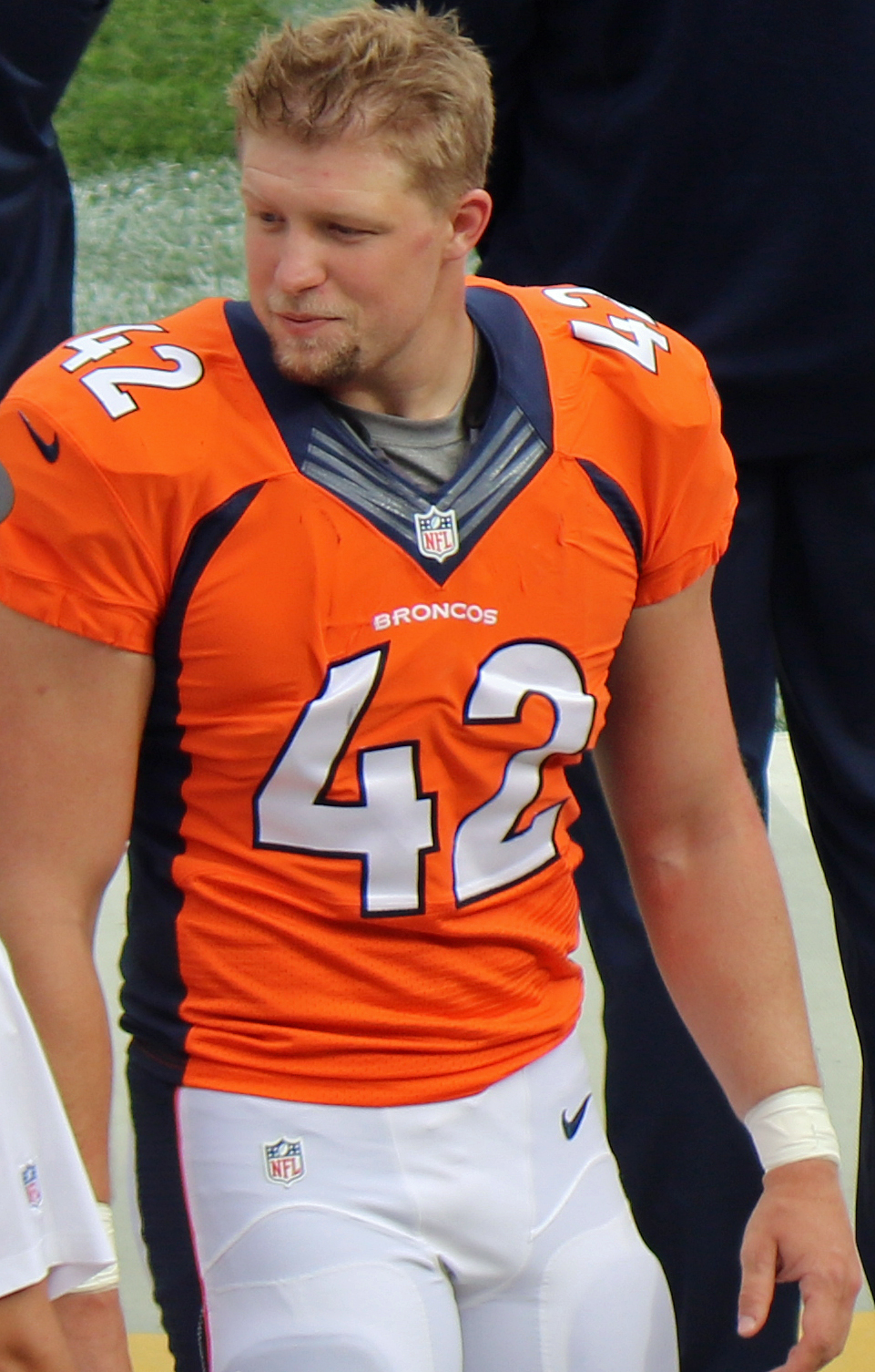
- Kreiter with the Denver Broncos in 2016

No. 59 – Arizona Cardinals
- Position: Long snapper
- Roster status: Active

Personal information
- Born: August 13, 1990 (age 36); DeWitt, Iowa, U.S.
- Listed height: 6 ft 1 in (1.85 m)
- Listed weight: 250 lb (113 kg)

Career information
- High school: Central (DeWitt)
- College: Iowa (2009–2013)
- NFL draft: 2014: undrafted

Career history
- Dallas Cowboys (2014–2015)*; Denver Broncos (2016–2019); New York Giants (2020–2025); Arizona Cardinals (2026–present)
- * Offseason or practice squad member only

Awards and highlights
- Pro Bowl (2018)

Career NFL statistics as of Week 8, 2026
- Games played: 167
- Total tackles: 17
- Stats at Pro Football Reference

Casey Kreiter (born August 13, 1990) is an American professional football long snapper for the Arizona Cardinals of the National Football League (NFL). He played college football for the Iowa Hawkeyes.

== Early life ==
Kreiter attended Central High School. He played as a linebacker and tight end. As a junior, he received All-conference and second-team All-state honors. As a senior, he set the Iowa prep state record for points in a game, while receiving All-conference and All-state honors.

He also competed in wrestling, track and baseball. He received All-conference honors in wrestling as a senior.

== College career ==
Kreiter accepted a football scholarship from the University of Iowa. As a redshirt freshman, he only played in the 27–24 loss against the University of Minnesota, handling long snaps in fourth quarter.

As a sophomore, he became the team's long snapper, while receiving Academic All-Big Ten honors. As a junior, he was the team's long snapper and posted 7 special teams tackles, while receiving Academic All-Big Ten honors.

As a senior, he was the team's long snapper and the backup center behind James Ferentz, while receiving honorable-mention All-Big Ten and Academic All-Big Ten honors.

== Professional career ==
Pre-draft measurables
Height	Weight	Arm length	Hand span	Wingspan	40-yard dash	10-yard split	20-yard split	20-yard shuttle	Three-cone drill	Vertical jump	Broad jump	Bench press
6 ft 2 in (1.88 m)	251 lb (114 kg)	30 7/8 in (0.78 m)	9 3/8 in (0.24 m)	6 ft 5 1/2 in (1.97 m)	5.03 s	1.71 s	2.88 s	4.40 s	7.26 s	32.5 in (0.83 m)	8 ft 8 in (2.64 m)	13 reps
All values from Iowa's Pro Day

=== Dallas Cowboys ===
Kreiter was signed as an undrafted free agent by the Dallas Cowboys after the 2014 NFL draft on May 12. He was waived on August 26.

On March 18, 2015, he was re-signed by the Cowboys. He was released on August 31, after not being able to pass on the depth chart stalwart long snapper L.P. Ladouceur.

=== Denver Broncos ===
On April 7, 2016, Kreiter signed as a free agent with the Denver Broncos, to compete for the long snapper position after Aaron Brewer left in free agency. He won the starting job in July. He played in 10 games, before suffering a season-ending calf injury during a practice. On December 16, 2016, he was placed on the injured reserve list. He was replaced with Thomas Gafford.

On April 3, 2017, he was re-signed and was able to regain the long snapper job. On April 6, 2018, he was re-signed. He was selected to his first Pro Bowl, after making 146 snaps without an error. On March 7, 2019, he re-signed with the Broncos.

=== New York Giants ===
On April 1, 2020, Kreiter signed as a free agent with the New York Giants, to compete against Zak DeOssie. He reunited with offensive coordinator Jason Garrett, who was the head coach of the Cowboys when he tried out for the team. He earned the long snapper job during preseason and DeOssie opted to retire on August 7. He was placed on the reserve/COVID-19 list by the team on November 18, 2020, and activated on November 23.

On March 17, 2021, Kreiter re-signed with the Giants.

On March 16, 2022, Kreiter re-signed with the Giants.

On March 13, 2023, Krieter re-signed with the Giants. On March 29, 2023, Kreiter changed his jersey number from 58 to 59 in order for Bobby Okereke to wear 58.

Kreiter once again re-signed with the Giants on March 10, 2024.

After the 2025 season, he was not resigned by the Giants after hiring John Harbaugh.

=== Arizona Cardinals ===
On March 12, 2026, Kreiter signed a one-year contract with the Arizona Cardinals. The move reunites him with his former special teams coordinator Michael Ghobrial.
