= Chris Manhertz =

American football player (born 1992)

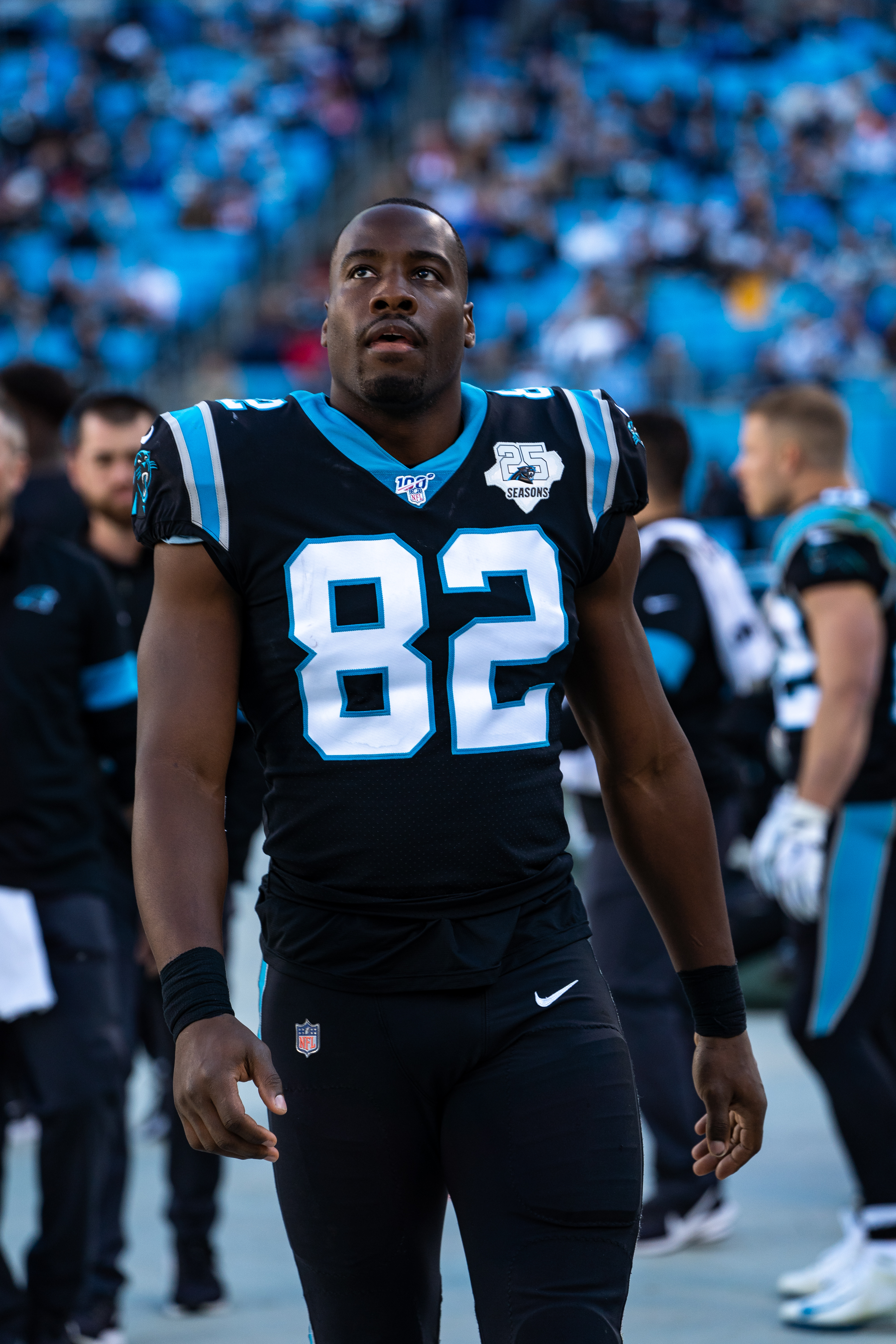
- Manhertz with the Carolina Panthers in 2019

No. 85 – New York Giants
- Position: Tight end
- Roster status: Active

Personal information
- Born: April 10, 1992 (age 34); The Bronx, New York, U.S.
- Listed height: 6 ft 6 in (1.98 m)
- Listed weight: 235 lb (107 kg)

Career information
- High school: Cardinal Spellman (The Bronx)
- College: Canisius (2010–2014)
- NFL draft: 2015: undrafted

Career history
- Buffalo Bills (2015)*; New Orleans Saints (2015–2016); Carolina Panthers (2016–2020); Jacksonville Jaguars (2021–2022); Denver Broncos (2023); New York Giants (2024–present)
- * Offseason or practice squad member only

Career NFL statistics as of 2025
- Receptions: 30
- Receiving yards: 308
- Receiving touchdowns: 3
- Stats at Pro Football Reference

Chris Manhertz (born April 10, 1992) is an American professional football tight end for the New York Giants of the National Football League (NFL). He was signed by the Buffalo Bills as an undrafted free agent in 2015. He played college basketball for the Canisius Golden Griffins.

== Early life ==
Manhertz was born in the Bronx, New York. He attended Cardinal Spellman High School, then Canisius College, a Buffalo, New York-based Catholic school that had abolished its football program in 2003. Manhertz played for the Canisius Golden Griffins men's basketball squad from 2010 to 2014, where he was a standout player and three-year captain for the squad.

== Professional career ==
Pre-draft measurables
Height	Weight
6 ft 5 1/4 in (1.96 m)	238 lb (108 kg)
Values from Pro Day

=== Buffalo Bills ===
Upon graduating college, Manhertz, who had never before played football and whose only experience with the game came from the Madden NFL series, began training to change sports and pursue a career in professional football. He was offered a tryout from the Buffalo Bills and was signed a future/reserve contract in May 2015, although coach Rex Ryan admitted his chances of making the roster were a longshot. He did not make the Bills' final roster after training camp and the pre-season.

=== New Orleans Saints ===
Manhertz joined the New Orleans Saints after being released by the Bills and spent the season on the Saints' practice squad. Manhertz made the Saints' active roster to start the 2016 season and made his NFL debut on September 18, 2016. He was released by New Orleans on October 16.

=== Carolina Panthers ===
Manhertz was claimed off waivers by the Carolina Panthers on October 17, 2016.

He played in 16 games with four starts in 2017 in place of the injured Greg Olsen, recording two catches for 17 yards. He suffered a high ankle sprain in Week 17 and was placed on injured reserve.

In Week 15 of the 2018 season, Manhertz caught his first career touchdown on a trick play 50-yard pass from running back Christian McCaffrey.

On January 29, 2019, Manhertz signed a two-year contract extension with the Panthers and was named the starter for the 2020 season.

=== Jacksonville Jaguars ===
On March 17, 2021, Manhertz signed a two-year, $6.65 million contract with the Jacksonville Jaguars. During a Week 1 game against the Houston Texans, Manhertz caught a 22-yard touchdown pass from rookie quarterback Trevor Lawrence. It was the first career touchdown pass for Lawrence.

=== Denver Broncos ===
On March 15, 2023, Manhertz signed a two-year contract with the Denver Broncos. He was released on March 8, 2024.

=== New York Giants ===
On March 16, 2024, Manhertz signed with the New York Giants. He played in all 17 games (including 11 starts) as the primary blocking tight end.

On March 8, 2025, Manhertz signed a one-year contract extension with the Giants. He played in all 17 games (starting three) for New York, recording one reception for seven scoreless yards.

On March 9, 2026, Manhertz re-signed with the Giants for a third season with the team.

== NFL career statistics ==
Legend
**Bold**	Career high

=== Regular season ===
Year	Team	Games		Receiving					Fumbles	
Year	Team	GP	GS	Rec	Yds	Avg	Lng	TD	Fum	Lost
2016	NO	3	2	0	0	0.0	0	0	0	0
2016	CAR	4	0	1	10	10.0	10	0	0	0
2017	CAR	16	4	2	17	8.5	11	0	0	0
2018	CAR	16	4	2	52	**26.0**	**50**	**1**	0	0
2019	CAR	15	6	1	11	11.0	11	0	0	0
2020	CAR	16	12	**6**	52	8.7	17	0	0	0
2021	JAX	17	10	**6**	**71**	11.8	22	**1**	0	0
2022	JAX	17	11	**6**	42	7.0	21	0	0	0
2023	DEN	16	4	2	16	8.0	10	0	0	0
2024	NYG	17	11	3	30	10.0	16	**1**	0	0
2025	NYG	17	3	1	7	7.0	7	0	0	0
Career		154	67	30	308	10.3	50	3	0	0

=== Postseason ===
Year	Team	Games		Receiving					Fumbles	
Year	Team	GP	GS	Rec	Yds	Avg	Lng	TD	Fum	Lost
2022	JAX	2	1	0	0	0.0	0	0	0	0
Career		2	1	0	0	0.0	0	0	0	0
