= Dru Phillips =

American football player (born 2001)

No. 22 – New York Giants
- Position: Cornerback
- Roster status: Active

Personal information
- Born: November 30, 2001 (age 24); Birmingham, Alabama, U.S.
- Listed height: 5 ft 11 in (1.80 m)
- Listed weight: 190 lb (86 kg)

Career information
- High school: Mauldin (Mauldin, South Carolina)
- College: Kentucky (2020–2023)
- NFL draft: 2024: 3rd round, 70th overall pick

Career history
- New York Giants (2024–present)

Career NFL statistics as of Week 5, 2026
- Tackles: 156
- Sacks: 3
- Forced fumbles: 2
- Fumble recoveries: 1
- Pass deflections: 14
- Interceptions: 3
- Stats at Pro Football Reference

Andru Phillips (born November 30, 2001) is an American professional football cornerback for the New York Giants of the National Football League (NFL). He played college football for the Kentucky Wildcats.

== Early life ==
Phillips was born on November 30, 2001, in Birmingham, Alabama. He grew up in Atlanta, Georgia, and Louisville, Kentucky, before attended Mauldin High School in Mauldin, South Carolina. In Phillips senior season, he notched 38 tackles, eight pass deflections, and two interceptions. Phillips committed to play college football for the Kentucky Wildcats.

== College career ==
In the 2020 season, Phillips decided to use the season to redshirt. In 2021, Phillips played in nine games making three tackles. Phillips entered the 2022 season, as a week one starter versus Miami (OH). In the 2022 season, Phillips made 31 tackles with one and half going for a loss, and five pass deflections. In the 2023 regular season, Phillips totaled 44 tackles, and four pass deflections. After the conclusion of the 2023 season, Phillips declared for the 2024 NFL draft.

Phillips finished his career at Kentucky with 80 tackles, with two and a half being for a loss, and nine pass deflections.

== Professional career ==
Pre-draft measurables
Height	Weight	Arm length	Hand span	Wingspan	40-yard dash	10-yard split	20-yard split	20-yard shuttle	Three-cone drill	Vertical jump	Broad jump	Bench press
5 ft 10 3/4 in (1.80 m)	190 lb (86 kg)	31 1/4 in (0.79 m)	8 3/4 in (0.22 m)	6 ft 3 in (1.91 m)	4.48 s	1.51 s	2.63 s	4.29 s	6.98 s	42.0 in (1.07 m)	11 ft 3 in (3.43 m)	16 reps
All values from NFL Combine/Pro Day

Phillips was selected by the New York Giants with the 70th overall pick in the third round of the 2024 NFL draft.

== NFL career statistics ==
Legend
**Bold**	Career high

=== Regular season ===
Year	Team	Games		Tackles					Interceptions						Fumbles				
Year	Team	GP	GS	Cmb	Solo	Ast	Sck	TFL	Int	Yds	Avg	Lng	TD	PD	FF	Fmb	FR	Yds	TD
2024	NYG	14	6	**71**	46	**25**	1.0	7	1	25	25.0	25	0	1	**2**	0	0	0	0
2025	NYG	17	8	66	**49**	17	0.0	**9**	**2**	**56**	**28.0**	**56**	0	**12**	0	0	**1**	0	0
2026	NYG	5	2	19	16	3	**2.0**	2	0	0	0.0	0	0	1	0	0	0	0	0
Career		36	16	156	111	45	3.0	18	3	81	27.0	56	0	14	2	0	1	0	0
