= Brian Burns (American football) =

American football player (born 1998)

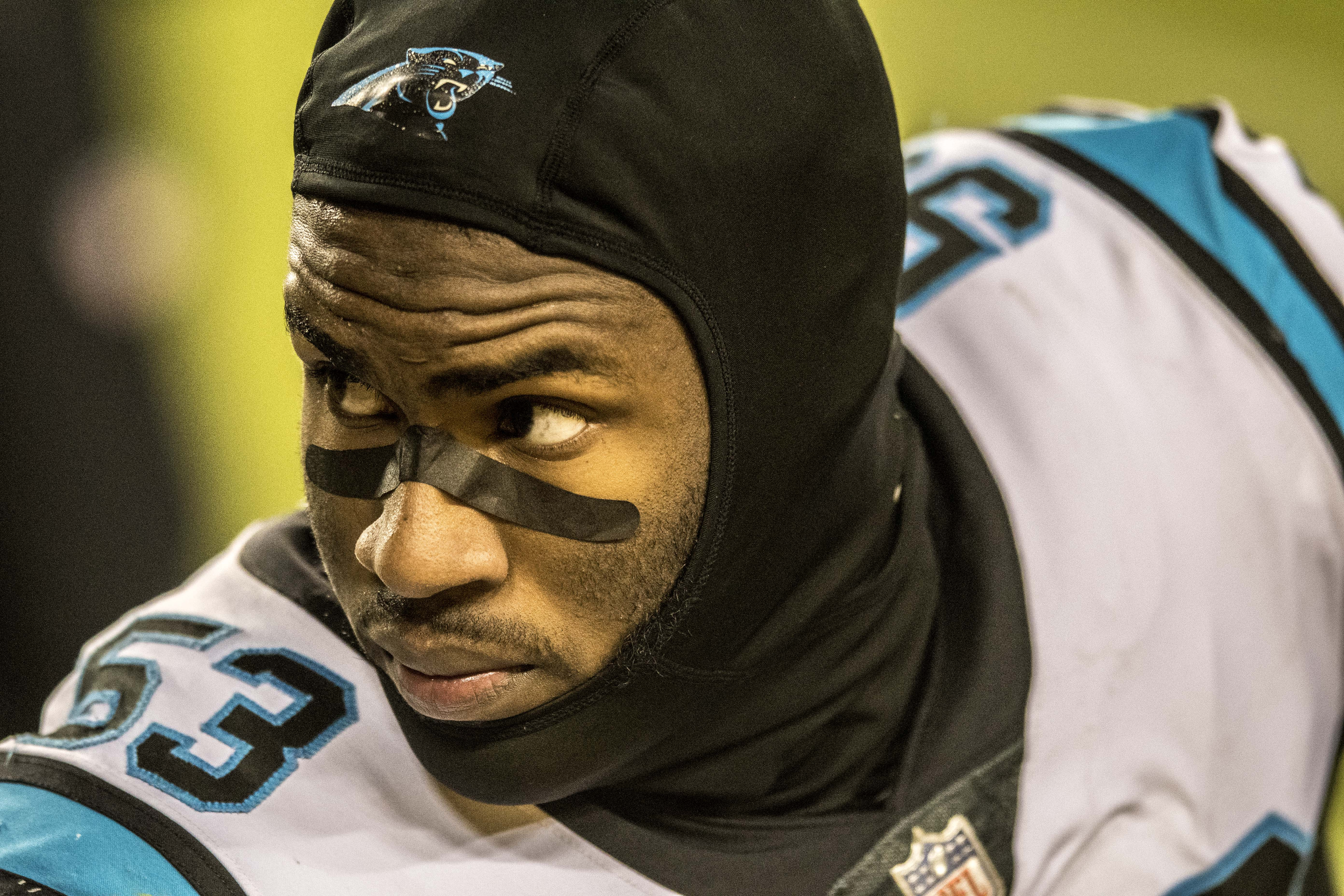
- Burns with the Carolina Panthers in 2020

No. 0 – New York Giants
- Position: Outside linebacker
- Roster status: Injured reserve

Personal information
- Born: April 23, 1998 (age 28); Fort Lauderdale, Florida, U.S.
- Listed height: 6 ft 5 in (1.96 m)
- Listed weight: 250 lb (113 kg)

Career information
- High school: American Heritage (Plantation, Florida)
- College: Florida State (2016–2018)
- NFL draft: 2019: 1st round, 16th overall pick

Career history
- Carolina Panthers (2019–2023); New York Giants (2024–present)

Awards and highlights
- Second-team All-Pro (2025); 3× Pro Bowl (2021, 2022, 2025); First-team All-ACC (2018)

Career NFL statistics as of Week 3, 2026
- Total tackles: 388
- Sacks: 71
- Forced fumbles: 13
- Fumble recoveries: 3
- Pass deflections: 28
- Defensive touchdowns: 1
- Stats at Pro Football Reference

Brian Burns (born April 23, 1998) is an American professional football outside linebacker for the New York Giants of the National Football League (NFL). He played college football for the Florida State Seminoles and was selected by the Carolina Panthers in the first round of the 2019 NFL draft.

== Early life ==
Burns attended American Heritage School, where he played high school football. Over his junior and senior seasons, he had 135 tackles and 28 sacks combined and helped his team win state titles. Burns played in the 2016 U.S. Army All-American Bowl. He committed to Florida State University to play college football.

== College career ==
As a freshman at Florida State in 2016, Burns played in all 13 games and led all freshmen in the country with 8.5 sacks. As a sophomore in 2017, he started all 13 games and had 48 tackles and 4.5 sacks. As a junior in 2018, Burns started all 12 games, recording 52 tackles and 10 sacks. After the season, Burns decided to forgo his senior year and enter the 2019 NFL draft.

== Professional career ==
Pre-draft measurables
Height	Weight	Arm length	Hand span	Wingspan	40-yard dash	10-yard split	20-yard split	Three-cone drill	Vertical jump	Broad jump	Wonderlic
6 ft 4 3/4 in (1.95 m)	249 lb (113 kg)	33 7/8 in (0.86 m)	10 in (0.25 m)	6 ft 11 5/8 in (2.12 m)	4.53 s	1.57 s	2.62 s	7.01 s	36.0 in (0.91 m)	10 ft 9 in (3.28 m)	22
All values are from NFL Scouting Combine

=== Carolina Panthers ===
Burns was selected by the Carolina Panthers in the first round with the 16th overall pick in the 2019 NFL draft. In Week 5 against the Jacksonville Jaguars, Burns recorded a sack on Gardner Minshew and returned a forced fumble for a touchdown in the 34–27 win. As a rookie, he appeared in 16 games and started five. He finished with 7.5 sacks, 25 total tackles, and one forced fumble.

In Week 3 of the 2020 season against the Los Angeles Chargers, Burns recorded his first sack of the season on Justin Herbert, a strip sack that was recovered by the Panthers, during the 21–16 win. In Week 7 against the New Orleans Saints, Burns recorded a strip sack on Drew Brees that was recovered by the Panthers during the 27–24 loss. In Week 11 against the Detroit Lions, Burns recorded two sacks on Matthew Stafford during a shutout win and was named the NFC Defensive Player of the Week. He appeared in 15 games and started 14 in the 2020 season. He finished with nine sacks, 58 total tackles, four passes defended, and three forced fumbles.

On December 27, 2021, Burns was placed on the Panthers COVID-19 reserve list. In the 2021 season, he appeared in all 17 games and started 16. He finished with nine sacks, 50 total tackles, four passes defended, and two forced fumbles. He earned Pro Bowl honors for the 2021 season. He was ranked 76th by his fellow players on the NFL Top 100 Players of 2022.

The Panthers picked up the fifth-year option on Burns's contract on April 26, 2022. In Week 12 against the Denver Broncos, Burns had two sacks on Russell Wilson, a forced fumble, and one pass deflection, earning him NFC Defensive Player of The Week. He finished the 2022 season with 12.5 sacks, 63 total tackles, three passes defended, and one forced fumble in 16 games and starts. He earned Pro Bowl honors for the 2022 season. He was ranked 54th by his fellow players on the NFL Top 100 Players of 2023.

Burns opened the 2023 season at Atlanta with seven tackles and two sacks. It marked his third career multi-sack game. He moved up the Panthers all-time sack list in Week 5 at Detroit, making his 42nd career sack and passing Kevin Greene for fifth all-time in Panthers history. In the 2023 season, Burns finished with eight sacks, 50 total tackles, two passes defended, one forced fumble, and one fumble recovery in 16 games. He was ranked 55th by his fellow players on the NFL Top 100 Players of 2024.

On March 5, 2024, the Panthers placed the franchise tag on Burns.

=== New York Giants ===
On March 13, 2024, the Panthers traded Burns with the San Francisco 49ers' 2024 fifth-round pick to the New York Giants in exchange for second-round and fifth-round picks in the 2024 NFL draft. The Giants then signed Burns to a five-year, $141 million contract with $87.5 million guaranteed. He finished the 2024 season with 8.5 sacks, 71 tackles, and eight passes defended. He finished the 2025 season with 16.5 sacks, 67 tackles, seven passes defended, and three forced fumbles. He earned Pro Bowl honors for the 2025 season.

During the Giants Week 3 victory against the Tennessee Titans, Burns suffered an ACL tear, ending his 2026 season.

== Career statistics ==
Legend
**Bold**	Career high

=== NFL ===
Year	Team	Games		Tackles					Interceptions					Fumbles			
Year	Team	GP	GS	Cmb	Solo	Ast	Sck	Sfty	Int	Yds	Lng	TD	PD	FF	FR	Yds	TD
2019	CAR	16	5	25	19	6	7.5	0	0	0	0	0	0	1	**1**	**56**	**1**
2020	CAR	15	14	58	35	23	9.0	0	0	0	0	0	4	**3**	0	0	0
2021	CAR	17	16	50	31	19	9.0	0	0	0	0	0	4	2	0	0	0
2022	CAR	16	16	63	34	**29**	12.5	0	0	0	0	0	3	1	0	0	0
2023	CAR	16	16	50	32	18	8.0	0	0	0	0	0	2	1	**1**	0	0
2024	NYG	17	17	**71**	**42**	**29**	8.5	0	0	0	0	0	**8**	2	0	0	0
2025	NYG	17	17	67	39	28	**16.5**	0	0	0	0	0	7	**3**	**1**	23	0
2026	NYG	3	2	4	4	0	0.0	0	0	0	0	0	0	0	0	0	0
Career		117	103	388	236	152	71.0	0	0	0	0	0	28	13	3	79	1

=== College ===
Season	Team	GP	Tackles					Interceptions					Fumbles			
Season	Team	GP	Solo	Ast	Cmb	TfL	Sck	Int	Yds	Avg	TD	PD	FR	Yds	TD	FF
2016	Florida State	8	14	9	23	9.5	8.5	0	0	0.0	0	0	0	0	0	1
2017	Florida State	13	26	**22**	48	13.5	4.5	0	0	0.0	0	**4**	**1**	0	0	**3**
2018	Florida State	12	**31**	21	**52**	**15.5**	**10.0**	0	0	0.0	0	3	**1**	0	0	**3**
Career		33	71	52	123	38.5	23	0	0	0.0	0	7	2	0	0	7

== Personal life ==
Burns's older brother, Stanley McClover, was drafted by the Carolina Panthers in the seventh round of the 2006 NFL draft. Burns is a fan of the Marvel character Spider-Man.
