= Art Green (defensive back) =

American football player (born 2000)

No. 23 – Arizona Cardinals
- Position: Cornerback
- Roster status: Practice squad

Personal information
- Born: April 29, 2000 (age 26); Chesterfield, Missouri, U.S.
- Listed height: 6 ft 1 in (1.85 m)
- Listed weight: 201 lb (91 kg)

Career information
- High school: Parkway Central (Chesterfield)
- College: Hutchinson (2018–2019); Houston (2020–2022)
- NFL draft: 2023: undrafted

Career history
- Denver Broncos (2023); New York Giants (2024–2025); Arizona Cardinals (2026–present)

Career NFL statistics as of Week 10, 2026
- Tackles: 21
- Forced fumbles: 1
- Stats at Pro Football Reference

Art Green (born April 29, 2000) is an American professional football cornerback for the Arizona Cardinals of the National Football League (NFL). He played college football for the Hutchinson Blue Dragons and Houston Cougars and was signed by the Denver Broncos as an undrafted free agent in 2023.

== Early life ==
Green was born on April 29, 2000, in Chesterfield, Missouri. He attended Parkway Central High School there and played football. As a senior, Green, a two-way player, had 29 receptions for 528 yards and 13 touchdowns as a wide receiver with 46 tackles and three interceptions as a defensive back, being named all-metro by the St. Louis Post-Dispatch while helping Parkway Central reach the state playoff semifinals. Although initially committed to play college football for the Arkansas State Red Wolves, he later opted to go the junior college route with the Hutchinson Blue Dragons.

== College career ==
Green appeared in eight games as a freshman at Hutchinson in 2018, totaling 19 tackles and six interceptions. He then appeared in 10 games in the 2019 season, recording 13 tackles, two interceptions and 1.5 tackles-for-loss. He was ranked a three-star junior college recruit and initially committed to play for the Tennessee Volunteers before flipping to the Houston Cougars.

Green appeared in eight games, recording 10 tackles, in the 2020 season for Houston. He then played all 14 games in the 2021 season and hd 18 tackles with an interception. As a senior in 2022, Green started 11 games and had 49 tackles, eight pass breakups three tackles-for-loss and two interceptions, being named second-team All-American Athletic Conference (AAC). He played in the team's 2022 Independence Bowl victory and was named the defensive most valuable player after posting a career-best nine tackles.

== Professional career ==
Pre-draft measurables
| Height | Weight | Arm length | Hand span | Wingspan | 40-yard dash | 10-yard split | 20-yard split | 20-yard shuttle | Three-cone drill | Vertical jump | Broad jump |
|---|---|---|---|---|---|---|---|---|---|---|---|
| 6 ft 1 1/4 in (1.86 m) | 198 lb (90 kg) | 30 7/8 in (0.78 m) | 8 7/8 in (0.23 m) | 6 ft 5 1/8 in (1.96 m) | 4.36 s | 1.48 s | 2.48 s | 4.26 s | 7.02 s | 36.0 in (0.91 m) | 10 ft 2 in (3.10 m) |
All values from Pro Day

=== Denver Broncos ===
After going unselected in the 2023 NFL draft, Green was signed by the Denver Broncos as an undrafted free agent. He was released at the final roster cuts and subsequently re-signed to the practice squad. He was signed to the team's active roster on January 6, 2024, prior to their season finale against the Las Vegas Raiders.

On August 26, 2024, Green was waived by the Broncos.

=== New York Giants ===
On August 29, 2024, Green was signed to the New York Giants' practice squad. He was promoted to the active roster on November 6.

Green began the 2025 season as one of New York's backup defensive backs. After suffering a hamstring injury in Week 8 against the Philadelphia Eagles, Green was placed on injured reserve on November 1, 2025. He was activated on December 20, ahead of the team's Week 16 matchup against the Minnesota Vikings.

On March 10, 2026, Green re-signed with the Giants. On August 30, Green was waived by New York with an injury settlement.

=== Arizona Cardinals ===
On September 16, 2026, Green signed with the Arizona Cardinals' practice squad, reuniting with his former special teams coordinator Michael Ghobrial.
