= Dyontae Johnson =

American football player (born 2000)

Profile
- Position: Linebacker

Personal information
- Born: September 28, 2000 (age 26); Detroit, Michigan, U.S.
- Listed height: 6 ft 2 in (1.88 m)
- Listed weight: 235 lb (107 kg)

Career information
- High school: Cass Tech (Detroit)
- College: Toledo (2018–2022)
- NFL draft: 2023: undrafted

Career history
- New York Giants (2023–2024); Birmingham Stallions (2026); Tennessee Titans (2026)*
- * Offseason or practice squad member only

Career NFL statistics as of 2024
- Total tackles: 11
- Stats at Pro Football Reference

Dyontae Antjuan Johnson (born September 28, 2000) is an American professional football linebacker. He played college football for the Toledo Rockets and was signed by the Giants as an undrafted free agent in 2023.

== Early life ==
Johnson was born on September 28, 2000, in Detroit, Michigan. He attended Cass Technical High School in Detroit where he played linebacker and helped the team win two regional titles (2016, 2017) and a state championship with an undefeated 2016 season. He committed to play college football for the Toledo Rockets as a three-star recruit.

== College career ==
Johnson did not miss a single game in his collegiate career. As a freshman at Toledo in 2018, he played in all 13 games and totaled eight tackles. He then made 23 tackles in 12 games during the 2019 season, being mainly used as a reserve. He then won a starting role in 2020 and did not miss a start for the rest of his collegiate career. Johnson was the team leader in tackles in 2020 with 47, also posting 4.5 tackles-for-loss (TFLs) that year. In 2021, he was named third-team All-Mid-American Conference (MAC) while recording 86 tackles (fourth on the team), eight TFLs, 2.5 sacks and an interception.

As a senior in 2022, Johnson placed second on the team with 109 tackles and was named second-team All-MAC. He also made eight TFLs, three sacks and three passes defended. He helped the Rockets win the 2022 MAC Championship Game and was named the defensive MVP of the game after recording eight tackles. Johnson was invited to the Hula Bowl all-star game and concluded his collegiate career having totaled 273 tackles, 22.5 TFLs and 6.5 sacks in 57 games played.

== Professional career ==
Pre-draft measurables
| Height | Weight | Arm length | Hand span | Wingspan | 40-yard dash | 10-yard split | 20-yard split | 20-yard shuttle | Three-cone drill | Vertical jump | Broad jump | Bench press |
|---|---|---|---|---|---|---|---|---|---|---|---|---|
| 6 ft 2 1/8 in (1.88 m) | 235 lb (107 kg) | 32 3/4 in (0.83 m) | 10 1/8 in (0.26 m) | 6 ft 7 5/8 in (2.02 m) | 4.76 s | 1.60 s | 2.78 s | 4.62 s | 7.28 s | 28.5 in (0.72 m) | 9 ft 4 in (2.84 m) | 23 reps |
All values from Pro Day

=== New York Giants ===
After going unselected in the 2023 NFL draft, Johnson signed with the New York Giants as an undrafted free agent. He was waived at the final roster cuts, on August 29, and re-signed to the practice squad the next day. After having spent the entirety of the 2023 season on the practice squad, he signed a reserve/future contract with the Giants on January 8, 2024. He was a standout performer in training camp in 2024. He recorded four tackles, two for a loss, and a sack in the preseason opener against the Detroit Lions, but suffered an ankle sprain in the game that led to him missing the rest of preseason. He was announced to have made the team's initial 53-man roster after surviving cutdowns on August 27, but was placed on injured reserve the following day later due to his injury from preseason. He was activated on December 24.

On March 26, 2025, Johnson re-signed with the Giants. He was waived by New York on August 23.

=== Birmingham Stallions ===
On January 14, 2026, Johnson was selected by the Birmingham Stallions of the United Football League (UFL).

=== Tennessee Titans ===
On August 25, 2026, Johnson was signed by the Tennessee Titans. On August 30, Johnson was waived by the Titans as a part of final roster cuts before the start of the regular season.
