= Joe Schoen =

American football executive (born 1979)

New York Giants
- Title: General manager

Personal information
- Born: July 11, 1979 (age 47); Elkhart, Indiana, U.S.

Career information
- Positions: Wide receiver, quarterback
- High school: Elkhart Memorial
- College: DePauw (1997–2001)

Career history
- Carolina Panthers (2001–2007); Scouting assistant (2001); Area scout (2002–2007); Miami Dolphins (2008–2016); National scout (2008–2012); Assistant director of college scouting (2013); Director of player personnel (2014–2016); Buffalo Bills (2017–2021) Assistant general manager; New York Giants (2022–present) General manager

Joseph Schoen (SHANE) (born July 11, 1979) is an American professional football executive who is the senior vice president and general manager of the New York Giants of the National Football League (NFL). Schoen previously served as the assistant general manager for the Buffalo Bills from 2017 to 2021. Schoen began his NFL career as a scout for the Carolina Panthers before serving in the scouting department for the Miami Dolphins from 2008 to 2016 and joining the Bills in 2017.

== Early life and education ==
A native of Elkhart, Indiana, Schoen played college football at DePauw University. He played as a quarterback his freshman year, and then, transitioned to wide receiver for his final three years, serving as a captain during his senior season. He was also a member of Alpha Tau Omega fraternity. He graduated from DePauw University in 2001 with a communications degree.

== Executive career ==
=== Carolina Panthers ===
In 2001, Schoen began his career as a scouting assistant for the Carolina Panthers before being hired as an area scout in 2002.

=== Miami Dolphins ===
In 2008, Schoen joined the Miami Dolphins as a national scout. In 2013, he was promoted to assistant director of college scouting and was again promoted to director of player personnel in 2014.

=== Buffalo Bills ===
On May 14, 2017, Schoen was hired by the Buffalo Bills as their assistant general manager, reuniting with general manager Brandon Beane, whom Schoen worked with during his time in Carolina. Schoen worked with Brian Daboll, whom he ended up hiring as the Giants head coach after being hired as the Giants general manager. Schoen was there when the team drafted Josh Allen.

=== New York Giants ===
On January 21, 2022, Schoen was named the general manager of the New York Giants. Schoen is the first Giants general manager since George Young was hired in 1979 to have no previous ties to the franchise. Schoen's first job as general manager was hiring a new head coach. He hired Buffalo Bills offensive coordinator Brian Daboll, with whom Schoen worked during the new general manager's tenure in Buffalo. Schoen also led the draft effort, selecting Oregon defensive end Kayvon Thibodeaux and Alabama offensive tackle Evan Neal, respectively, with the Giants two first-round picks. He also drafted cornerback Deonte Banks with the 24th overall pick in the 2023 NFL draft, and wide receiver Malik Nabers with the 6th overall pick in the 2024 draft.

During Schoen's tenure, he hired several new scouts and embraced a digital draft board. However, he was widely criticized for a string of poor decisions. These included signing quarterback Daniel Jones to a four-year $160 million contract in the 2023 offseason, as Jones struggled, winning only three more games as the starter before he was released in November 2024. Schoen was also criticized for letting running back Saquon Barkley walk in free agency; Barkley eventually signed with the division rival Philadelphia Eagles. Schoen has also faced backlash for selecting Neal and Banks in successive drafts. Schoen's decision to re-sign Darius Slayton to a three-year, $36 million contract in March 2025 has also been criticized.

After the 2025 season John Mara and Steve Tisch hired John Harbaugh as the team's coach. Harbaugh's contract gave him the final say on all personnel decisions, which led to speculation Schoen could be fired after the 2026 draft. However, on May 21, 2026, Schoen agreed to a "multi-year" contract extension with the Giants.
