= Brian Daboll =

Canadian-born American football coach (born 1975)

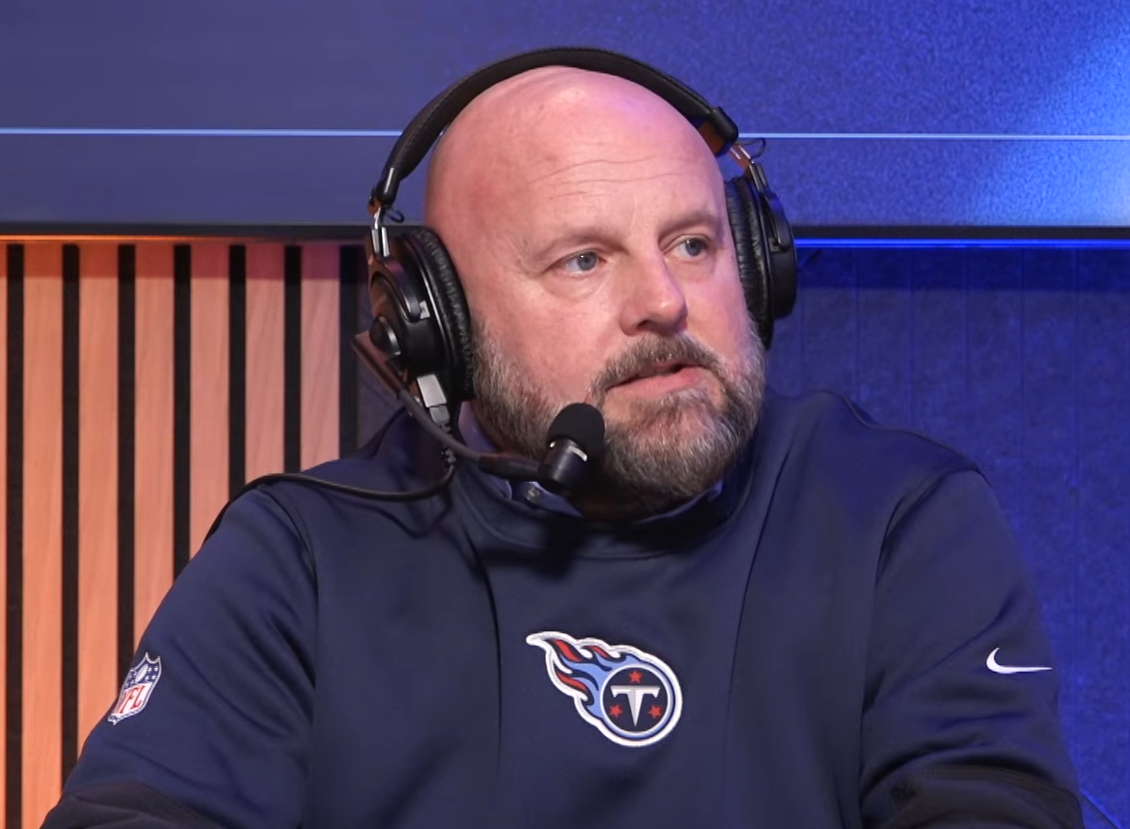
- Daboll with the Tennessee Titans in 2026

Tennessee Titans
- Title: Offensive coordinator

Personal information
- Born: April 14, 1975 (age 51); Welland, Ontario, Canada

Career information
- High school: St. Francis (Athol Springs, New York, U.S.)
- College: University of Rochester (1993–1996)

Career history
- William & Mary (1997) Volunteer assistant; Michigan State (1998–1999) Graduate assistant; New England Patriots (2000–2006); Defensive assistant (2000–2001); Wide receivers coach (2002–2006); New York Jets (2007–2008) Quarterbacks coach; Cleveland Browns (2009–2010) Offensive coordinator; Miami Dolphins (2011) Offensive coordinator; Kansas City Chiefs (2012) Offensive coordinator; New England Patriots (2013–2016) Tight ends coach; Alabama (2017) Offensive coordinator & quarterbacks coach; Buffalo Bills (2018–2021) Offensive coordinator; New York Giants (2022–2025) Head coach; Tennessee Titans (2026–present) Offensive coordinator

Awards and highlights
- As a head coach: AP NFL Coach of the Year (2022); As an assistant coach: 5× Super Bowl champion (XXXVI, XXXVIII, XXXIX, XLIX, LI); AP NFL Assistant Coach of the Year (2020); CFP national champion (2017)

Head coaching record
- Regular season: 20–40–1 (.336)
- Postseason: 1–1 (.500)
- Career: 21–41–1 (.341)
- Coaching profile at Pro Football Reference

Brian Michael Daboll (/ˈdeɪbəl/ DAY-bəl; born April 14, 1975) is a Canadian-born professional American football coach who is the offensive coordinator for the Tennessee Titans of the National Football League (NFL). He previously served as the head coach of the New York Giants from 2022 to 2025. Daboll has also previously served as the offensive coordinator for the Cleveland Browns, Miami Dolphins, Kansas City Chiefs, Alabama Crimson Tide, and Buffalo Bills and in various capacities as an assistant coach for the New England Patriots and New York Jets.

== Early life ==
Born in Welland, Ontario, Canada on April 14, 1975, Daboll was raised in the United States by his grandparents in nearby West Seneca, New York. Daboll attended Saint Francis High School in Hamburg, New York and was a letterman in football. He was teammates there with future coach Brian Polian and future NFL front office executive Dave Caldwell. Daboll attended the University of Rochester and was a letterman and two-year starter in football as a safety. He graduated with a degree in economics.

== Coaching career ==
=== Early career ===
Daboll was hired as a restricted earnings coach by the College of William & Mary in 1997 before moving to Michigan State University as a graduate assistant from 1998 to 1999 under head football coach Nick Saban.

=== New England Patriots ===
Daboll began his NFL coaching career at the age of 24 with the New England Patriots as a defensive coaching assistant in 2000 under new head coach Bill Belichick. After personnel assistant Josh McDaniels was promoted to defensive assistant, Daboll was promoted to wide receivers coach for the Patriots in 2002. After the 2006 season, he left the Patriots to serve as the Jets' quarterbacks coach. The Patriots won three Super Bowls during Daboll's first stint with the Patriots.

=== New York Jets ===
In 2007, Daboll joined Eric Mangini's staff with the New York Jets as the quarterbacks' coach. Mangini and Daboll both served as assistants on the Patriots from 2000 to 2005. Daboll coached quarterbacks Chad Pennington, Kellen Clemens, and Brett Favre during his tenure in New York. The Jets fired coach Mangini on December 29, 2008, after the Jets finished 9–7 despite an 8–3 start to the season. Daboll was not retained under new head coach Rex Ryan.

=== Cleveland Browns ===
In 2009, Daboll joined the Cleveland Browns as offensive coordinator, reuniting with Mangini, whom he worked alongside in New England and on the New York Jets. Under Daboll, the Browns had the NFL's 32nd ranked offense in 2009 and the 29th ranked offense in 2010.

=== Miami Dolphins ===
Daboll was named offensive coordinator of the Miami Dolphins under head coach Tony Sparano in 2011, with the team improving from 30th in the league to 20th in overall offense. However, the Dolphins fired Sparano after the team started 4–9, and Daboll was not retained under new head coach Joe Philbin.

=== Kansas City Chiefs ===
On February 6, 2012, the Kansas City Chiefs announced the hiring of Daboll as offensive coordinator, replacing the retired Bill Muir. Daboll was reunited with new head coach Romeo Crennel, with whom Daboll worked on the Patriots from 2001 to 2004. The 2012 Chiefs finished with a league-worst 2–14 record and fired Crennel after just one season as head coach. Daboll was not retained by new head coach Andy Reid.

=== New England Patriots (second stint) ===
On January 13, 2013, the Patriots announced that Daboll would be brought back in a coaching capacity for the rest of the season. Six days later, the Patriots lost to the eventual Super Bowl champion Baltimore Ravens 28–13 in the AFC championship game.

Daboll served as the Patriots tight ends' coach from 2013 to 2016, coaching Pro Bowl tight end Rob Gronkowski. The team won Super Bowl XLIX and Super Bowl LI during Daboll's second stint in New England.

=== Alabama ===
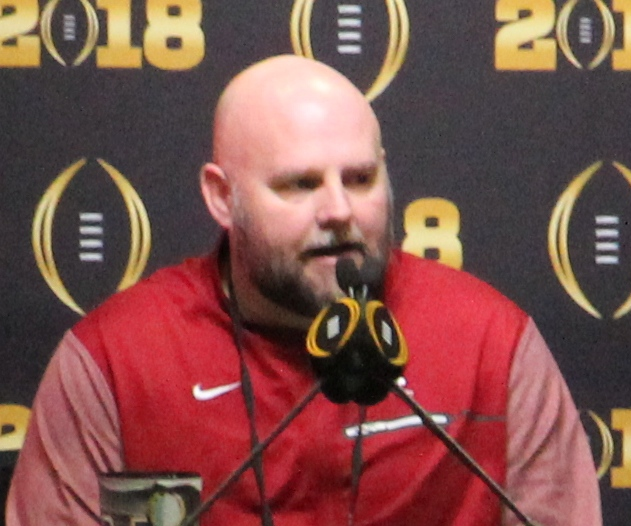
Daboll in 2018

On February 18, 2017, Daboll returned to college football as offensive coordinator for the Alabama Crimson Tide, marking Daboll's first college football coaching stint in 18 years. Daboll was reunited with Alabama head coach Nick Saban, for whom he had worked while Saban was the head coach of Michigan State. He helped Alabama reach the 2018 National Championship Game, where the Tide defeated the Georgia Bulldogs in overtime. He coached quarterbacks Jalen Hurts and Tua Tagovailoa during his lone season in Alabama.

=== Buffalo Bills ===
On January 14, 2018, Daboll was named the new offensive coordinator for his hometown team, the Buffalo Bills, under head coach Sean McDermott. Daboll is credited in part with the development of quarterback Josh Allen, whom many scouts saw as a "project" coming out of college. In 2020, Daboll's third season with the Bills, Allen set numerous franchise records, and the Bills' offense improved significantly, finishing second that year with 31.3 points per game. The team finished with 13 wins for the first time since 1991, won their first division title and playoff game since 1995, and made their first AFC Championship Game since 1993, which they lost to the Kansas City Chiefs 38–24. For his work, Daboll won the Associated Press NFL Assistant Coach of the Year award for the 2020 season.

Daboll's time in Buffalo culminated in the 2021–22 NFL playoffs, with the Bills defeating the Patriots 47–17 in the Wild Card round. Buffalo scored a touchdown on each of their seven offensive possessions (not including their final possession, which included three kneel-downs by backup quarterback Mitchell Trubisky), a feat which had never been previously achieved. It was the most lopsided playoff defeat suffered by a Belichick-coached Patriots team. The following week, the Bills faced the Chiefs for an AFC Divisional matchup that would come to be known as the "13 Seconds" game. Despite Josh Allen's 397 total yards (329 passing and 68 rushing) and four passing touchdowns, all to WR Gabriel Davis, who accumulated 201 receiving yards in the game, Kansas City and Patrick Mahomes engineered a game-tying drive in the final 13 seconds of regulation, before winning it in overtime with a touchdown reception by Travis Kelce.

=== New York Giants ===
Daboll was hired as the New York Giants' 20th head coach on January 28, 2022. His debut as head coach came in a narrow 21–20 road victory over the Tennessee Titans. The Giants got off to a 7–2 start to the season, their best start in a decade, and on January 1, 2023, they defeated the Indianapolis Colts 38–10, clinching their first playoff berth since 2016. The team finished the regular season at 9–7–1, earning the sixth seed in the NFC for the 2022–23 NFL playoffs. The Giants defeated the Minnesota Vikings 31–24 in the NFC Wild Card Round, their first postseason victory since winning Super Bowl XLVI in 2012. However, their season ended in the Divisional Round with a 38–7 road loss to their rivals, the Philadelphia Eagles. Daboll was named the Associated Press NFL Coach of the Year for his first season as Giants head coach.

The 2023 season did not match the success they saw the previous year, as the team finished 6–11, in third place in the NFC East. After quarterback Daniel Jones went down with an injury after five games, and Tyrod Taylor exited the Week 8 game with a rib injury, rookie Tommy DeVito led the Giants to three consecutive wins, passing for eight touchdowns and 1,101 yards against three interceptions. On October 29, 2023, Daboll was criticized for calling for a 35-yard field goal on 4th-and-1 at the Jets 17 yard line rather than going for it and trying to end the game, as the Jets had no timeouts and only 28 seconds remained on the clock, especially considering kicker Graham Gano was facing an injury. The kick was missed, allowing the Jets to eventually win the game in overtime.

During Week 2 of the 2024 NFL season, Daboll was widely criticized for not having a backup kicker when Graham Gano sustained an injury on the opening kickoff. He was also criticized for using Gano on the opening kickoff when he had a groin issue prior to the game. The decision was thought to have significantly contributed to their 21–18 loss to the Washington Commanders. Daboll was also widely criticized about how he handled quarterback Daniel Jones, including benching him, demoting him to fourth-string, and eventually cutting him. The Giants endured a 10-game losing streak during the 2024 season and finished 3–14, a franchise record for losses. The morning after the season finale, team co-owner John Mara announced that Daboll and general manager Joe Schoen would return for a fourth season.

On November 10, 2025, Daboll was fired by the Giants after a 2–8 start to the 2025 season. He finished his tenure in New York with a 20–40–1 (.336) regular-season record and a 1–1 (.500) playoff record for a combined record of 21–41–1 (.341).

=== Tennessee Titans ===
On January 27, 2026, the Tennessee Titans hired Daboll as their offensive coordinator under new head coach Robert Saleh.

== Head coaching record ==
Team	Year	Regular season					Postseason			
Team	Year	Won	Lost	Ties	Win %	Finish	Won	Lost	Win %	Result
NYG	2022	9	7	1	.559	3rd in NFC East	1	1	.500	Lost to Philadelphia Eagles in NFC Divisional Game
NYG	2023	6	11	0	.353	3rd in NFC East	—	—	—	—
NYG	2024	3	14	0	.176	4th in NFC East	—	—	—	—
NYG	2025	2	8	0	.200	(Fired)	—	—	—	—
Total		20	40	1	.336		1	1	.500	
