= Michael Ghobrial =

American football coach (born 1988)

Arizona Cardinals
- Title: Special teams coordinator

Personal information
- Born: February 9, 1988 (age 38); Torrance, California, U.S.

Career information
- Position: Defensive end
- High school: West (Torrance, California)
- College: UCLA

Career history
- UCLA (2009–2010) Undergraduate assistant; UCLA (2011) Quality control coach; UCLA (2012–2013) Graduate assistant; Syracuse (2014) Graduate assistant; Colorado Mesa (2015) Co-special teams coordinator, defensive line coach & outside linebackers coach; Tarleton State (2016–2017) Special teams coordinator, defensive line coach & outside linebackers coach; Detroit Lions (2017) Bill Walsh diversity coaching fellowship; Hawaii (2018–2019) Special teams coordinator; Washington State (2020) Special teams coordinator; New York Jets (2021–2023) Assistant special teams coordinator; New York Giants (2024–2025) Special teams coordinator; Arizona Cardinals (2026–present) Special teams coordinator

Michael Ghobrial (born February 9, 1988) is an American professional football coach who is the special teams coordinator for the Arizona Cardinals of the National Football League (NFL). He previously served as the special teams coordinator for the New York Giants from 2024 to 2025.

Ghobrial played college football at UCLA and previously served as an assistant coach for the Detroit Lions, New York Jets and New York Giants.

== Playing career ==
Ghobrial played two seasons for the UCLA Bruins as a defensive end in 2006 and 2007.

== Coaching career ==
=== Early career ===
Ghobrial got his first coaching job with UCLA as an undergraduate assistant in 2009. In 2011, Ghobrial was promoted to quality control coach, and then in 2012 he became a graduate assistant with the Bruins. In 2014, Ghobrial joined the Syracuse Orange as a graduate assistant.

=== Colorado Mesa ===
In 2015, Ghobrial was hired by Colorado Mesa to coach the teams' outside linebackers, defensive line, and to be the special team coordinator.

=== Tarleton State ===
During the 2016 season, he was named special teams coordinator at Tarleton State, a position he held through the 2017 season.

=== Detroit Lions ===
In 2017, Ghobrial joined the Detroit Lions as a part of the Bill Walsh Diversity Coaching Fellowship.

=== Hawaii ===
In 2018, he was named special team coordinator for the Hawaii Rainbow Warriors a position he held for two years.

=== Washington State ===
In 2020, he was hired by Washington State where he coached for one season.

=== New York Jets ===
In 2021, Ghobrial was hired by the New York Jets as their assistant special teams coordinator under head coach Robert Saleh.

=== New York Giants ===
On January 25, 2024, Ghobrial was hired by the New York Giants as their special teams coordinator under head coach Brian Daboll.

On January 21, 2026, it was announced that Ghobrial would not be retained by the Giants on new head coach John Harbaugh's inaugural staff.

=== Arizona Cardinals ===
On February 13, 2026, Ghobrial was hired by the Arizona Cardinals as their special teams coordinator under head coach Mike LaFleur.
