= 2022 New York Giants season =

98th season in franchise history, first playoff berth since 2016

- Owner: John Mara; Steve Tisch
- General manager: Joe Schoen
- Head coach: Brian Daboll
- Offensive coordinator: Mike Kafka
- Defensive coordinator: Don Martindale
- Home stadium: MetLife Stadium

Results
- Record: 9–7–1
- Division place: 3rd NFC East
- Playoffs: Won Wild Card Playoffs (at Vikings) 31–24; Lost Divisional Playoffs (at Eagles) 7–38
- All-Pros: 2: LT Andrew Thomas (2nd team); DT Dexter Lawrence (2nd team)
- Pro Bowlers: 2: RB Saquon Barkley; DT Dexter Lawrence

Uniform
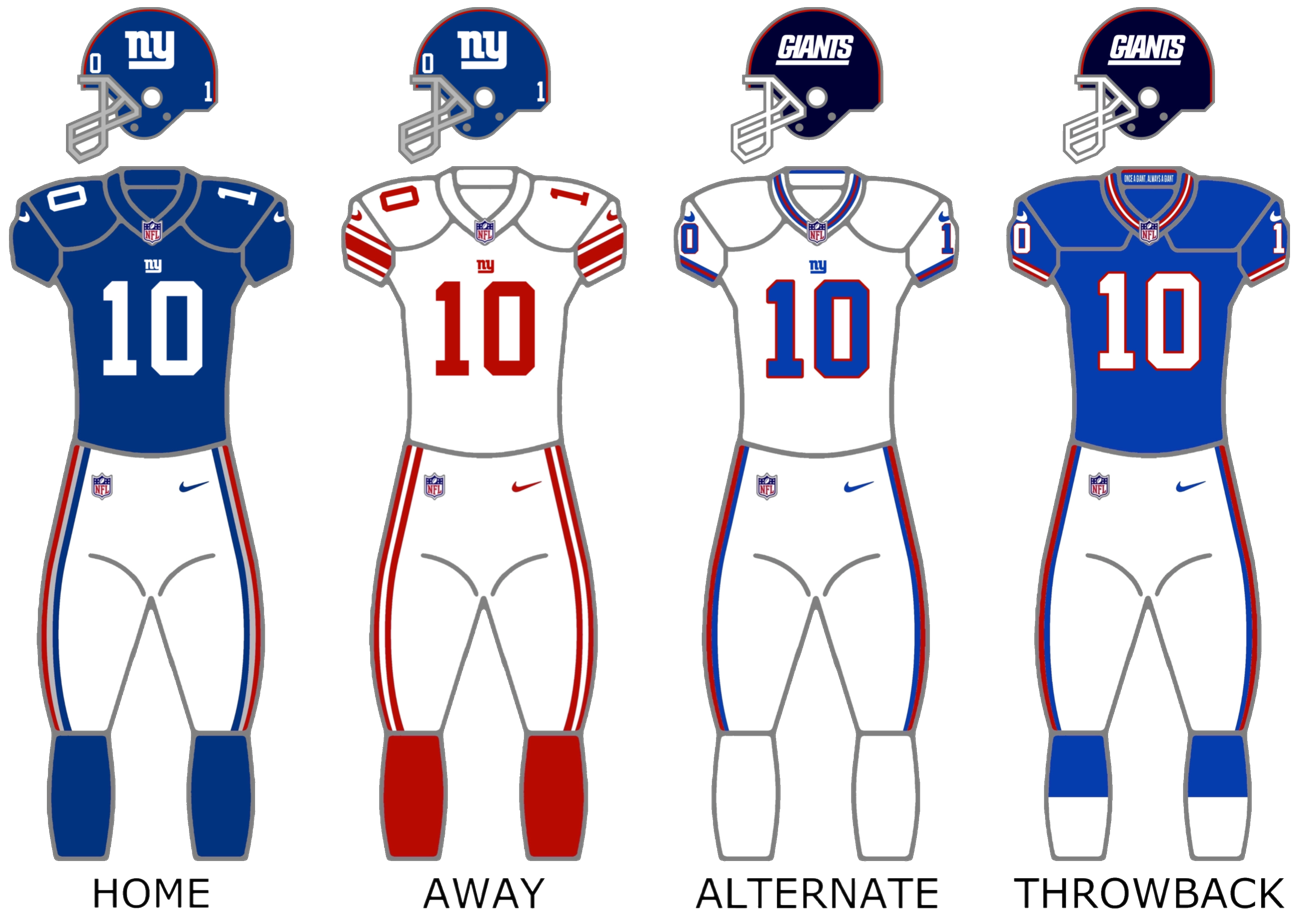

The 2022 season was the New York Giants' 98th in the National Football League (NFL), their 47th season playing in The Meadowlands and their 13th playing at MetLife Stadium.

Following the conclusion of the 2021 season, head coach Joe Judge was fired and general manager Dave Gettleman retired. In the offseason, the Giants hired Bills front office assistant Joe Schoen to become their general manager, who in turn hired Bills offensive coordinator Brian Daboll to become the 22nd head coach in franchise history.

The Giants started 2–0 for the first time since 2016 and had their best start since 2008. The Giants surpassed their 2021 win total after a Week 6 win over the Baltimore Ravens. With a win over the Washington Commanders in Week 15, they guaranteed their first non-losing season since 2016, and their first season since 2009 in which they never had a losing record at any stage. Despite struggling in the second half of the season, the Giants clinched a playoff spot and a winning record for the first time since 2016 and their first without Eli Manning since 2002, with a Week 17 win over the Indianapolis Colts and finished 9–7–1. Their .559 winning percentage was their best since 2016.

As the sixth seed in the NFC, the Giants upset the 13-4 Minnesota Vikings 31–24 in the Wild Card round, getting their first playoff win since Super Bowl XLVI in 2012 and first since the 2000 NFC Championship without Manning. However, the Giants' season would end the following week with a 38–7 loss to their arch-rival and eventual NFC champion Philadelphia Eagles in the Divisional Round.

== Offseason ==
=== Office and coaching changes ===
==== General manager ====
Fourth-year general manager Dave Gettleman retired from the New York Giants on January 10, 2022. Gettleman drafted Saquon Barkley and Daniel Jones, among others. On January 21, 2022, the Giants hired Joe Schoen, the former assistant general manager for the Buffalo Bills, as their general manager.

==== Head coach ====
The New York Giants fired second-year head coach Joe Judge on January 11, 2022, who led the Giants to a 2nd-place finish in the NFC East after his first season as head coach. On January 28, 2022, Brian Daboll, the former offensive coordinator for the Buffalo Bills, was hired as head coach.

==== Coaching staff changes ====
2022 New York Giants Staff Changes
Coach	Position	Reason left	Replacement
Joe Judge	Head coach	Fired	Brian Daboll
Jason Garrett	Offensive coordinator	Fired (mid 2021)	Mike Kafka
Rob Sale	Offensive line coach	Accepted job at Florida	Bobby Johnson
Sean Spencer	Defensive line coach	Accepted job at Florida	Andre Patterson
Jerry Schuplinski	Quarterbacks coach	Fired	Shea Tierney
Tyke Tolbert	Wide Receivers coach	Fired	Mike Groh
Patrick Graham	Assistant Head Coach/defensive coordinator	Accepted job as Raiders defensive coordinator	Don Martindale
Burton Burns	Running Backs coach	Retired	DeAndre Smith
Derek Dooley	Tight Ends Coach	Fired	Andy Bischoff
Kevin Sherrer	Linebackers Coach	Fired	Drew Wilkins and John Egorugwu
Jody Wright	Offensive Assistant	Accepted job as South Carolina tight ends coach	Christian Jones
Nick Williams	Offensive Assistant	Moved Positions	Cade Knox
Freddie Kitchens	Senior Offensive Assistant	Fired	Position Eliminated
Ben Wilkerson	Assistant Offensive Line Coach	Fired	Tony Sparano Jr.
Tom Quinn	Assistant Special Teams Coordinator	Fired	Anthony Blevins
Anthony Blevins	Assistant Linebackers Coach	Moved Positions	Position Eliminated
Jeremy Pruitt	Senior Defensive Assistant	Fired	Position Eliminated
Ryan Anderson	Defensive quality control	Fired	Position Eliminated
Carter Blount	Defensive quality control	Fired	Position Eliminated
Russ Callaway	Offensive quality control	Fired	Angela Baker

=== Free agency ===
==== Players with the New York Giants in 2021 ====
Position	Player	Tag	Date signed	2022 team	Notes
QB	Jake Fromm	ERFA			Not tendered
OT	Kyle Murphy	ERFA			Not tendered
S	J. R. Reed	ERFA	March 21	Denver Broncos	Not tendered; 1 year, $895,000; waived on August 30
WR	David Sills	ERFA	March 11	New York Giants	1 year, $825,000
CB	Jarren Williams	ERFA	March 16	New York Giants	1 year, $825,000; waived on August 5
FB	Cullen Gillaspia	RFA	September 28	Seattle Seahawks	
DB	Joshua Kalu	RFA	July 23	Tennessee Titans	1 year, $965,000
S	Steven Parker	RFA	August 7	Washington Commanders	1 year, $965,000; released on August 30
WR	C. J. Board	UFA	March 14	New York Giants	1 year, $965,000; waived on August 30
LB	Lorenzo Carter	UFA	March 22	Atlanta Falcons	1 year, $3.5 million
CB	Keion Crossen	UFA	March 17	Miami Dolphins	3 years, $10.5 million
OT	Korey Cunningham	UFA	March 17	New York Giants	1 year, $1.06 million; cut on July 22
S	Nate Ebner	UFA			
TE	Evan Engram	UFA	March 16	Jacksonville Jaguars	1 year, $9 million
QB	Mike Glennon	UFA			
G	Will Hernandez	UFA	March 28	Arizona Cardinals	1 year, $1.187 million
NT	Austin Johnson	UFA	March 16	Los Angeles Chargers	2 years, $14 million
LS	Casey Kreiter	UFA	March 21	New York Giants	1 year, $1.035 million
LB	Benardrick McKinney	UFA			
FB	Elijhaa Penny	UFA			
S	Jabrill Peppers	UFA	March 30	New England Patriots	1 year, $2 million
WR	Dante Pettis	UFA	May 12	Chicago Bears	1 year, $1.035 million
C	Billy Price	UFA	October 4	Arizona Cardinals	
LB	Reggie Ragland	UFA			
WR	John Ross	UFA			
NT	Danny Shelton	UFA	August 15	Kansas City Chiefs	1 year, $1.12 million
C	Matt Skura	UFA	September 21	Los Angeles Rams	
LB	Jaylon Smith	UFA	September 20	New York Giants	
OT	Nate Solder	UFA			
TE	Levine Toilolo	UFA			

Player re-signed by the Giants	Player signed by another team

==== Players with other teams in 2021 ====
Position	Player	Tag	Date signed	2021 Team	Contract
TE	Jordan Akins	UFA	April 23	Houston Texans	1 year, $1.085 million
RB	Matt Breida	UFA	March 21	Buffalo Bills	1 year, $1.035 million
G	Jamil Douglas	UFA	March 21	Washington Football Team	1 year, $1.035 million
NT	Justin Ellis	UFA	March 23	Baltimore Ravens	1 year, $1.12 million
C	Jon Feliciano	UFA	March 16	Buffalo Bills	1 year, $1.15 million
WR	Robert Foster	UFA	March 14	Dallas Cowboys	1 year, $965,000
G	Max Garcia	UFA	March 28	Arizona Cardinals	1 year, $1.12 million
G	Mark Glowinski	UFA	March 17	Indianapolis Colts	3 years, $18.3 million
OT	Matt Gono	UFA	March 11	Atlanta Falcons	1 year, $1.035 million
WR	Richie James	UFA	March 25	San Francisco 49ers (2020 Team)	1 year, $965,000
QB	Tyrod Taylor	UFA	March 17	Houston Texans	2 years, $11 million
TE	Ricky Seals-Jones	UFA	March 18	Washington Football Team	1 year, $1.188 million
DE	Jihad Ward	UFA	March 21	Jacksonville Jaguars	1 year, $1.188 million

=== Roster moves ===
==== Contracts ====
Position	Player	Notes
WR	Sterling Shepard	Restructured; 1 year, $1.5 million
LB	Blake Martinez	Restructured; 1 year, $1.25 million
K	Graham Gano	Restructured to clear cap space
CB	Adoree' Jackson	Restructured to clear cap space

==== Departures ====
Position	Player	Notes
RB	Devontae Booker	Released
P	Riley Dixon	Released. Signed with the Los Angeles Rams
TE	Kyle Rudolph	Released. Signed with the Tampa Bay Buccaneers
S	Logan Ryan	Released. Signed with Tampa Bay.
TE	Kaden Smith	Waived
CB	James Bradberry	Released in order to clear cap space. Signed with the Philadelphia Eagles.
LB	Blake Martinez	Released. Signed with the Las Vegas Raiders.

==== Signings ====
Position	Player	Notes
WR	Alex Bachman	Reserve/futures
LB	Omari Cobb	Reserve/futures
P	Jamie Gillan	Reserve/futures
OT	Devery Hamilton	Reserve/futures
LB	Trent Harris	Reserve/futures
TE	Jake Hausmann	Reserve/futures
OLB	Niko Lalos	Reserve/futures
QB	Brian Lewerke	Reserve/futures
OT	Roy Mbaeteka	International Player Pathway Program
DT	David Moa	Reserve/futures
TE	Chris Myarick	Reserve/futures
RB	Sandro Platzgummer	Re-signed
WR	Austin Proehl	Reserve/futures
WR	Travis Toivonen	Reserve/futures
QB	Davis Webb	Reserve/futures
RB	Antonio Williams	Reserve/futures

=== Draft ===
2022 New York Giants Draft
Round	Selection	Player	Position	College	Notes
1	5	Kayvon Thibodeaux	DE	Oregon	
1	7	Evan Neal	OT	Alabama	from Chicago (Note: The Giants traded a 2021 first-round selection to the Chicago Bears in exchange for first- and fourth-round selections (7th and 112th overall), and 2021 first- and fourth-round selections.)
2	36	Traded to the New York Jets (Note: The Giants traded a second-round selection (36th overall) to the New York Jets in exchange for second- and fifth-round selections (38th and 146th overall).)			
2	38	Traded to Atlanta (Note: The Giants traded a second-round selection (38th overall) to the Atlanta Falcons in exchange for second- and fourth-round selections (43rd and 114th overall).)			from Carolina via NY Jets
2	43	Wan'Dale Robinson	WR	Kentucky	from Atlanta
3	67	Joshua Ezeudu	OG	North Carolina	
3	81	Cordale Flott	CB	LSU	from Miami (Note: The Giants traded a 2021 second-round selection to the Miami Dolphins in exchange for a third-round selection (81st overall) and a 2021 second-round selection.)
4	110	Traded to Baltimore (Note: The Giants traded a fourth-round selection (110th overall) to the Baltimore Ravens in exchange for G Ben Bredeson, a fifth-round selection (173rd overall) and a 2023 seventh-round selection.)			
4	112	Daniel Bellinger	TE	San Diego State	from Chicago
4	114	Dane Belton	S	Iowa	from Atlanta
5	146	Micah McFadden	LB	Indiana	from NY Jets
5	147	DJ Davidson	NT	Arizona State	
5	173	Marcus McKethan	G	North Carolina	from Kansas City via Baltimore
6	182	Darrian Beavers	LB	Cincinnati	
7	226	Traded to Cincinnati (Note: The Giants traded DE B. J. Hill and a conditional seventh-round selection (226th overall) to the Cincinnati Bengals in exchange for C Billy Price.)			

Draft trades

2022 New York Giants undrafted free agents
Name	Position	College	Ref.
Austin Allen	TE	Nebraska	
Jashaun Corbin	RB	Florida State	
Yusuf Corker	S	Kentucky	
Jabari Ellis	DT	South Carolina	
Darren Evans	CB	LSU	
Tomon Fox	LB	North Carolina	
Zyon Gilbert	CB	Florida Atlantic	
Jeremiah Hall	TE, FB	Oklahoma	
Christopher Hinton Jr.	DT	Michigan	
Andre Miller	TE	Maine	
Josh Rivas	G	Kansas State	
Trenton Thompson	S	San Diego State	
Antonio Valentino	DT	Florida	
Ryder Anderson	DE	Indiana	
Calvin Jackson Jr.	WR	Washington State	

== Staff ==
2022 New York Giants staff
Front office: President/CEO – John Mara; Chairman/executive vice president – Steve Tisch; Senior vice president & general manager – Joe Schoen; Assistant general manager – Brandon Brown; Senior vice president of football operations & strategy – Kevin Abrams; Senior personnel consultant – Chris Mara; Director of player personnel – Tim McDonnell; Assistant director of player personnel – Dennis Hickey; Director of pro scouting – Chris Rosetti; Director of football operations – Ed Triggs; Director of coaching operations – Laura Young; Head coaches: Head coach – Brian Daboll; Offensive coaches: Offensive coordinator – Mike Kafka; Quarterbacks – Shea Tierney; Running backs – DeAndre Smith; Wide receivers – Mike Groh; Tight ends – Andy Bischoff; Offensive line – Bobby Johnson; Assistant offensive line – Tony Sparano Jr.; Offensive assistant – Christian Jones; Offensive quality control – Angela Baker	Defensive coaches: Defensive coordinator – Don Martindale; Defensive line – Andre Patterson; Assistant defensive line – Bryan Cox; Outside linebackers – Drew Wilkins; Inside linebackers – John Egorugwu; Defensive backs – Jerome Henderson; Assistant defensive backs – Michael Treier; Defensive assistant – Kevin Wilkins; Special teams coaches: Special teams coordinator – Thomas McGaughey; Assistant special teams – Anthony Blevins; Quality control/Special teams – Nick Williams; Strength and conditioning: Director of strength and performance – Craig Fitzgerald; Assistant strength and performance – Drew Wilson; Performance manager/assistant strength and performance – Sam Coad

== Final roster ==
2022 New York Giants roster
Quarterbacks (QB): 8 Daniel Jones; 2 Tyrod Taylor; Running backs (RB): 26 Saquon Barkley; 31 Matt Breida; 23 Gary Brightwell; Wide receivers (WR): 19 Kenny Golladay; 18 Isaiah Hodgins; 80 Richie James; 84 Marcus Johnson; 86 Darius Slayton; Tight ends (TE): 82 Daniel Bellinger; 83 Lawrence Cager; 89 Nick Vannett	Offensive linemen (OL): 77 Jack Anderson G; 68 Ben Bredeson G; 67 Wyatt Davis G; 76 Jon Feliciano C; 65 Nick Gates C; 64 Mark Glowinski G; 73 Evan Neal T; 74 Matt Peart T; 79 Tyre Phillips T; 78 Andrew Thomas T; Defensive linemen (DL): 90 Ryder Anderson DE; 71 Justin Ellis NT; 97 Dexter Lawrence NT; 96 Henry Mondeaux DE; 55 Jihad Ward DE; 99 Leonard Williams DT	Linebackers (LB): 47 Cam Brown ILB; 21 Landon Collins ILB; 52 Carter Coughlin ILB; 57 Jarrad Davis ILB; 49 Tomon Fox OLB; 41 Micah McFadden ILB; 51 Azeez Ojulari OLB; 54 Jaylon Smith ILB; 5 Kayvon Thibodeaux OLB; 53 Oshane Ximines OLB; Defensive backs (DB): 24 Dane Belton SS; 28 Cordale Flott CB; 30 Darnay Holmes CB; 22 Adoree' Jackson CB; 36 Tony Jefferson SS; 20 Julian Love SS; 44 Nick McCloud CB; 29 Xavier McKinney FS; 37 Fabian Moreau CB; 27 Jason Pinnock FS; 25 Rodarius Williams CB; Special teams (ST): 9 Graham Gano K; 6 Jamie Gillan P; 58 Casey Kreiter LS	Practice squad: 34 Terrell Burgess FS; 91 Vernon Butler DT; -- Jashaun Corbin RB; 70 Korey Cunningham T; 38 Zyon Gilbert CB; 62 Devery Hamilton T; 88 Jaydon Mickens WR; 45 Andre Miller TE; 85 Chris Myarick FB; 81 Kalil Pimpleton WR; 87 Makai Polk WR; -- Sandro Platzgummer RB (IPP); 95 Quincy Roche OLB; 13 David Sills WR; 39 Trenton Thompson SS; 15 James Washington WR; 12 Davis Webb QB; Reserve: 43 Darrian Beavers ILB (IR); 98 DJ Davidson NT (IR); 75 Joshua Ezeudu G (IR); 15 Collin Johnson WR (IR); 66 Shane Lemieux G (IR); 60 Marcus McKethan G (IR); 33 Aaron Robinson CB (IR); 17 Wan'Dale Robinson WR (IR); 3 Sterling Shepard WR (IR); 94 Elerson Smith OLB (IR); 93 Nick Williams DT (IR); Rookies in italics 53 active, 11 reserve, 16 practice squad (1 exempt)

== Preseason ==
Week	Date	Opponent	Result	Record	Venue	Recap
1	August 11	at New England Patriots	W 23–21	1–0	Gillette Stadium	Recap
2	August 21	Cincinnati Bengals	W 25–22	2–0	MetLife Stadium	Recap
3	August 28	at New York Jets	L 27–31	2–1	MetLife Stadium	Recap

== Regular season ==
=== Schedule ===
On May 4, the NFL announced that the Giants played the Green Bay Packers during Week 5 on October 9 at Tottenham Hotspur Stadium in London, as part of the league's International Series. The game kickoff at 2:30 p.m. BST/9:30 a.m. EDT, and was televised by the NFL Network, with the Packers serving as the home team.

The remainder of the Giants' 2022 schedule was announced on May 12.

Week	Date	Opponent	Result	Record	Venue	Recap
1	September 11	at Tennessee Titans	**W** 21–20	1–0	Nissan Stadium	Recap
2	September 18	Carolina Panthers	**W** 19–16	2–0	MetLife Stadium	Recap
3	September 26	**Dallas Cowboys**	**L** 16–23	2–1	MetLife Stadium	Recap
4	October 2	Chicago Bears	**W** 20–12	3–1	MetLife Stadium	Recap
5	October 9	at Green Bay Packers	**W** 27–22	4–1	(United Kingdom) Tottenham Hotspur Stadium (London)	Recap
6	October 16	Baltimore Ravens	**W** 24–20	5–1	MetLife Stadium	Recap
7	October 23	at Jacksonville Jaguars	**W** 23–17	6–1	TIAA Bank Field	Recap
8	October 30	at Seattle Seahawks	**L** 13–27	6–2	Lumen Field	Recap
9	Bye					
10	November 13	Houston Texans	**W** 24–16	7–2	MetLife Stadium	Recap
11	November 20	Detroit Lions	**L** 18–31	7–3	MetLife Stadium	Recap
12	November 24	at **Dallas Cowboys**	**L** 20–28	7–4	AT&T Stadium	Recap
13	December 4	**Washington Commanders**	**T** 20–20 (OT)	7–4–1	MetLife Stadium	Recap
14	December 11	**Philadelphia Eagles**	**L** 22–48	7–5–1	MetLife Stadium	Recap
15	December 18	at **Washington Commanders**	**W** 20–12	8–5–1	FedEx Field	Recap
16	December 24	at Minnesota Vikings	**L** 24–27	8–6–1	U.S. Bank Stadium	Recap
17	January 1	Indianapolis Colts	**W** 38–10	9–6–1	MetLife Stadium	Recap
18	January 8	at **Philadelphia Eagles**	**L** 16–22	9–7–1	Lincoln Financial Field	Recap

Notes

- Intra-division opponents are in **bold** text.

=== Game summaries ===
==== Week 1: at Tennessee Titans ====
Week 1: New York Giants at Tennessee Titans – Game summary

Quarter	1	2	3	4	Total
**Giants**	0	0	13	8	**21**
Titans	7	6	7	0	**20**

at Nissan Stadium, Nashville, Tennessee

- Date: September 11
- Game time: 4:25 p.m. EDT/3:25 p.m. CDT
- Game weather: Cloudy, 75 °F (24 °C)
- Game attendance: 67,805
- Referee: Jerome Boger
- TV announcers (Fox): Kevin Kugler, Mark Sanchez and Laura Okmin
- Recap, Game Book

Game information

**First quarter**

- TEN – Dontrell Hilliard 7-yard pass from Ryan Tannehill (Randy Bullock kick), 9:48. Titans 7–0. **Drive: 5 plays, 45 yards, 3:00.**

**Second quarter**

- TEN – Randy Bullock 46-yard field goal, 12:35. Titans 10–0. **Drive: 10 plays, 65 yards, 4:34.**
- TEN – Randy Bullock 23-yard field goal, 6:57. Titans 13–0. **Drive: 7 plays, 37 yards, 3:03.**

**Third quarter**

- NYG – Saquon Barkley 4-yard run (kick failed, aborted snap), 11:16. Titans 13–6. **Drive: 4 plays, 90 yards, 1:29.**
- NYG – Sterling Shepard 65-yard pass from Daniel Jones (Graham Gano kick), 8:48. Tied 13–13. **Drive: 2 plays, 64 yards, 0:40.**
- TEN – Dontrell Hilliard 23-yard pass from Ryan Tannehill (Randy Bullock Kick), 2:54. Titans 20–13. **Drive: 9 plays, 75 yards, 5:54.**

**Fourth quarter**

- NYG – Chris Myarick 1-yard pass from Daniel Jones (Jones-Barkley pass), 1:06. Giants 21–20. **Drive: 12 plays, 73 yards, 4:21.**

**Top passers**

- NYG – Daniel Jones – 17/21, 188 yards, 2 TD, INT
- TEN – Ryan Tannehill – 20/33, 266 yards, 2 TD

**Top rushers**

- NYG – Saquon Barkley – 18 rushes, 164 yards, TD
- TEN – Derrick Henry – 21 rushes, 82 yards

**Top receivers**

- NYG – Sterling Shepard – 2 receptions, 71 yards, TD
- TEN – Kyle Philips – 6 receptions, 66 yards

The Giants were timid in the first half, struggling to move the ball while the Titans did so with ease. Despite trailing 13–0 at halftime, the Giants had two big plays to bring them back in the game. Saquon Barkley provided the first spark with a 68-yard carry and capping the drive off with a 5-yard touchdown run. On the next drive, Daniel Jones connected with Sterling Shepard on a 65-yard touchdown pass to tie the game. The Titans responded with a touchdown drive of their own, when Ryan Tannehill connected with running back Dontrell Hilliard for his second touchdown reception of the game, taking a 20–13 lead into the final quarter.

The Titans muffed a punt which the Giants recovered in the red zone, but Jones threw an end zone interception. On a Titans 3rd and 1, the Giants sniffed out a tight end sweep to get the ball back. Barkley had a 33-yard run to move the ball into Titans territory, then Jones converted a 4th and 1 on a quarterback keep. A few plays later, Jones threw a 1-yard touchdown pass to fullback Chris Myarick. The Giants opted to go for the two-point conversion instead of the tie, and Jones shoveled it to Barkley, who made two defenders miss and crossed the plane, giving the Giants a 21–20 lead with 1:06 to play. The Titans got the ball back with 1 timeout left and benefitted from two 3rd down defensive holding penalties to extend their drive into Giants territory. Tannehill hit wide receiver Kyle Philips to put the Titans in field goal range and spiked the ball with four seconds left, but Randy Bullock missed the 47-yard kick. The Giants won 21–20 and shocked the Titans.

The Giants had a winning record for the first time since the end of the 2016 season, which was also the last year they won their season opener. Brian Daboll won his first game as NFL head coach in his debut. Barkley finished with 194 scrimmage yards, 164 on the ground, a touchdown and a 2-point conversion and was selected as the NFC Offensive Player of the Week for his performance.

==== Week 2: vs. Carolina Panthers ====
Week 2: Carolina Panthers at New York Giants – Game summary

Quarter	1	2	3	4	Total
Panthers	0	6	7	3	**16**
**Giants**	6	0	7	6	**19**

at MetLife Stadium, East Rutherford, New Jersey

- Date: September 18
- Game time: 1:00 p.m. EDT
- Game weather: Fair, 73 °F (23 °C)
- Game attendance: 73,843
- Referee: Ronald Torbert
- TV announcers (Fox): Joe Davis, Daryl Johnston and Pam Oliver
- Recap, Game Book

Game information

**First quarter**

- NYG – Graham Gano 36-yard field goal, 12:50. Giants 3–0. **Drive: 4 plays, 4 yards, 2:02.**
- NYG – Graham Gano 33-yard field goal, 2:30. Giants 6–0. **Drive: 13 plays, 25 yards, 7:47.**

**Second quarter**

- CAR – Eddy Piñeiro 31-yard field goal, 12:15. Giants 6–3. **Drive: 13 plays, 58 yards, 5:15.**
- CAR – Eddy Piñeiro 32-yard field goal, 0:56. Tied 6–6. **Drive: 10 plays, 34 yards, 4:23.**

**Third quarter**

- CAR – D. J. Moore 16-yard pass from Baker Mayfield (Eddy Piñeiro kick), 12:27. Panthers 13–6. **Drive: 3 plays, 67 yards, 1:00.**
- NYG – Daniel Bellinger 16-yard pass from Daniel Jones (Graham Gano kick), 9:19. Tied 13–13. **Drive: 8 plays, 75 yards, 3:08.**

**Fourth quarter**

- NYG – Graham Gano 51-yard field goal, 12:31. Giants 16–13. **Drive: 9 plays, 58 yards, 3:24.**
- CAR – Eddy Piñeiro 38-yard field goal, 10:46. Tied 16–16. **Drive: 5 plays, 55 yards, 1:45.**
- NYG – Graham Gano 56-yard field goal, 3:34. Giants 19–16. **Drive: 11 plays, 37 yards, 7:12.**

**Top passers**

- CAR – Baker Mayfield – 14/29, 145 yards, TD
- NYG – Daniel Jones – 22/34, 176 yards, TD

**Top rushers**

- CAR – Christian McCaffrey - 15 rushes, 102 yards
- NYG – Saquon Barkley - 21 rushes, 72 yards

**Top receivers**

- CAR – D. J. Moore – 3 receptions, 43 yards, TD
- NYG – Richie James – 5 receptions, 51 yards

The Giants offense failed to capitalize on two early Panthers fumbles and settled for two field goals, which the Panthers matched in the second quarter. D. J. Moore scored a touchdown for Carolina to start the third quarter, and the Giants responded on their next drive when Daniel Jones hit rookie tight end Daniel Bellinger for his first NFL touchdown to tie the game. After exchanging another set of field goals, the Giants took a 19–16 lead late in the fourth quarter when Graham Gano hit a 56-yard field goal, his fourth of the game against his former team. Julian Love sacked Baker Mayfield on the following Panthers drive to force a punt, then Jones converted on 3rd down and ran out the clock.

The Giants won their home opener and started 2–0 for the first time since 2016. Gano was selected as the NFC Special Teams Player of the Week for his performance.

==== Week 3: vs. Dallas Cowboys ====
Week 3: Dallas Cowboys at New York Giants – Game summary

Quarter	1	2	3	4	Total
**Cowboys**	3	3	7	10	**23**
Giants	0	3	10	3	**16**

at MetLife Stadium, East Rutherford, New Jersey

- Date: September 26
- Game time: 8:15 p.m. EDT
- Game weather: Fair, 66 °F (19 °C)
- Game attendance: 79,445
- Referee: Land Clark
- TV announcers (ESPN/ABC): Joe Buck, Troy Aikman and Lisa Salters
- Recap, Game Book

Game information

**First quarter**

- DAL – Brett Maher 26-yard field goal, 2:09. Cowboys 3–0. **Drive: 10 plays, 55 yards, 3:01.**

**Second quarter**

- NYG – Graham Gano 42-yard field goal, 11:17. Tied 3–3. **Drive: 14 plays, 51 yards, 5:22.**
- DAL – Brett Maher 28-yard field goal, 9:09. Cowboys 6–3. **Drive: 5 plays, 53 yards, 2:08.**

**Third quarter**

- NYG – Graham Gano 51-yard field goal, 9:02. Tied 6–6. **Drive: 10 plays, 42 yards, 5:58.**
- NYG – Saquon Barkley 36-yard rush (Graham Gano kick), 5:31. Giants 13–6. **Drive: 6 plays, 77 yards, 2:29.**
- DAL – Ezekiel Elliott 1-yard rush (Brett Maher kick), 0:27. Tied 13–13. **Drive: 9 plays, 75 yards, 5:04.**

**Fourth quarter**

- DAL – CeeDee Lamb 1-yard pass from Cooper Rush (Brett Maher kick), 8:30. Cowboys 20–13. **Drive: 11 plays, 89 yards, 6:12.**
- DAL – Brett Maher 44-yard field goal, 5:58. Cowboys 23–13. **Drive: 4 plays, 9 yards, 1:34.**
- NYG – Graham Gano 51-yard field goal, 3:37. Cowboys 23–16. **Drive: 9 plays, 42 yards, 2:21.**

**Top passers**

- DAL – Cooper Rush – 21/31, 215 yards, TD
- NYG – Daniel Jones – 20/37, 196 yards, INT

**Top rushers**

- DAL – Tony Pollard – 13 rushes, 105 yards
- NYG – Saquon Barkley – 14 rushes, 81 yards, TD

**Top receivers**

- DAL – CeeDee Lamb – 8 receptions, 87 yards, TD
- NYG – Sterling Shepard – 5 receptions, 49 yards

The Giants scored their first two drives of the third quarter, the second a 36-yard touchdown run by Saquon Barkley to give the Giants their first lead of the game. The Cowboys responded with touchdowns on their next two drives to take a 20–13 lead - a rushing touchdown by Ezekiel Elliott and then a one-handed catch by CeeDee Lamb. The Cowboys forced a three-and-out and started their next possession in field goal range, which they kicked to make it a two-score game. The Giants had a chance to tie the game after kicking a field goal of their own, but Daniel Jones, under duress all night, threw an interception to Trevon Diggs to end the game.

Jones fell to 0–9 in primetime games and was sacked five times, including three by DeMarcus Lawrence. Kayvon Thibodeaux recorded a pass deflection in his NFL debut, and Sterling Shepard suffered a season-ending ACL tear on the last play of the game.

==== Week 4: vs. Chicago Bears ====
Week 4: Chicago Bears at New York Giants – Game summary

Quarter	1	2	3	4	Total
Bears	6	3	3	0	**12**
**Giants**	7	7	3	3	**20**

at MetLife Stadium, East Rutherford, New Jersey

- Date: October 2
- Game time: 1:00 p.m. EDT
- Game weather: Overcast, 58 °F (14 °C)
- Game attendance: 74,044
- Referee: Carl Cheffers
- TV announcers (Fox): Joe Davis, Daryl Johnston and Pam Oliver
- Recap, Game Book

Game information

**First quarter**

- CHI - Michael Badgley 29-yard field goal, 8:57. Bears 3–0. **Drive: 10 plays, 65 yards, 5:17.**
- NYG - Daniel Jones 21-yard rush (Graham Gano kick), 5:06. Giants 7–3. **Drive: 6 plays, 75 yards, 3:21.**
- CHI - Michael Badgley 22-yard field goal, 1:30. Giants 7–6. **Drive: 6 plays, 77 yards, 3:06.**

**Second quarter**

- NYG - Daniel Jones 8-yard rush (Graham Gano kick), 5:17. Giants 14–6. **Drive: 7 plays, 75 yards, 4:15.**
- CHI - Michael Badgley 40-yard field goal, 1:44. Giants 14–9. **Drive: 7 plays, 15 yards, 2:04.**

**Third quarter**

- CHI - Michael Badgley 35-yard field goal, 11:02. Giants 14–12. **Drive: 9 plays, 58 yards, 3:58.**
- NYG - Graham Gano 44-yard field goal, 1:33. Giants 17–12. **Drive: 5 plays, 60 yards, 2:50.**

**Fourth quarter**

- NYG - Graham Gano 43-yard field goal, 5:31. Giants 20–12. **Drive: 13 plays, 54 yards, 6:34**

**Top passers**

- CHI - Justin Fields - 11/22, 174 yards
- NYG - Daniel Jones - 8/13, 71 yards

**Top rushers**

- CHI - Khalil Herbert - 19 rushes, 77 yards
- NYG - Saquon Barkley - 31 rushes, 146 yards

**Top receivers**

- CHI - Darnell Mooney - 4 receptions, 94 yards
- NYG - Daniel Bellinger - 3 receptions, 23 yards

Daniel Jones had 2 touchdowns in the first half from designed bootleg runs, the latter set up by an Azeez Ojulari strip-sack. The Bears were 0–3 in red zone drives and only mustered 4 field goals by Michael Badgley. Saquon Barkley had 146 of 262 rushing yards for the Giants and the defense registered 6 sacks. Both Jones and backup quarterback Tyrod Taylor were injured, putting the starter for the next game in London against the Packers in doubt.

The Giants started 3–1 for the first time since 2011.

==== Week 5: at Green Bay Packers ====
NFL London games

Week 5: New York Giants at Green Bay Packers – Game summary

Quarter	1	2	3	4	Total
**Giants**	3	7	3	14	**27**
Packers	10	10	0	2	**22**

at Tottenham Hotspur Stadium, London, England

- Date: October 9
- Game time: 2:30 p.m. BST/9:30 a.m. EDT
- Game weather: Sunny, 64 °F (18 °C)
- Game attendance: 61,024
- Referee: Alex Kemp
- TV announcers (NFLN): Kevin Kugler, Mark Sanchez, Laura Okmin and Stacey Dales
- Recap, Game Book

Game information

**First quarter**

- GB – Mason Crosby 46-yard field goal, 11:05. Packers 3–0. **Drive: 9 plays, 49 yards, 3:55.**
- GB – Allen Lazard 4-yard pass from Aaron Rodgers (Mason Crosby kick), 3:19. Packers 10–0. **Drive: 5 plays, 60 yards, 2:15.**
- NYG – Graham Gano 48-yard field goal, 0:09. Packers 10–3. **Drive: 8 plays, 45 yards, 3:10.**

**Second quarter**

- GB – Marcedes Lewis 2-yard pass from Aaron Rodgers (Mason Crosby kick), 7:25. Packers 17–3. **Drive: 13 plays, 75 yards, 7:44.**
- NYG – Daniel Bellinger 2-yard run (Graham Gano kick), 1:15. Packers 17–10. **Drive: 11 plays, 86 yards, 6:10.**
- GB – Mason Crosby 48-yard field goal, 0:00. Packers 20–10. **Drive: 8 plays, 45 yards, 1:15.**

**Third quarter**

- NYG – Graham Gano 37-yard field goal, 7:57. Packers 20–13. **Drive: 11 plays, 56 yards, 7:03.**

**Fourth quarter**

- NYG – Gary Brightwell 2-yard run (Graham Gano kick), 10:08. Tied 20–20. **Drive: 15 plays, 91 yards, 8:07.**
- NYG – Saquon Barkley 2-yard run (Graham Gano kick), 6:08. Giants 27–20. **Drive: 6 plays, 60 yards, 3:34.**
- GB – Jamie Gillan ran out of bounds for a safety, 0:11. Giants 27–22.

**Top passers**

- NYG – Daniel Jones – 21/27, 217 yards
- GB – Aaron Rodgers – 25/39, 222 yards, 2 TD

**Top rushers**

- NYG – Saquon Barkley – 13 rushes, 70 yards, TD
- GB – Aaron Jones – 13 rushes, 63 yards

**Top receivers**

- NYG – Darius Slayton – 6 receptions, 79 yards
- GB – Randall Cobb – 7 receptions, 99 yards

The Giants made their third trip to London after winning their first two at Wembley in 2007 and at Twickenham in 2016, while the Packers made their first trip after being the only NFL team that had never played outside of America. In the 15 years and 31 games in London played up to this point, this was the first game where both teams had winning records.

The Packers started the game in control and took a 17–3 lead after Aaron Rodgers threw his second touchdown pass to Marcedes Lewis in the middle of the second quarter. Daniel Jones (who was cleared to start despite his ankle injury) led the Giants on a touchdown drive which Daniel Bellinger scored on a trick play. The Packers kicked a field goal as the clock expired to take a 20–10 halftime lead.

The Giants kicked a field goal to open the second half to make it a one score game. Dexter Lawrence had a huge 3rd down sack to end the Packers next drive and put them out of field goal range. Despite temporarily losing Saquon Barkley, the Giants tied the game on the next drive when Gary Brightwell scored his first NFL touchdown. After forcing a three-and-out, the Giants scored on their fifth consecutive drive and took the lead when Barkley scored his first touchdown of the game. The Packers methodically drove into field goal range and inside the red zone, but the Giants forced two pass deflections and a turnover on downs. After three kneels, punter Jamie Gillan intentionally ran out the side of the end zone to give the Packers a safety, but a lack of field position to get a Hail Mary. Rodgers had one last chance for Green Bay, but was strip-sacked by Oshane Ximines and the Giants won 27–22.

The Giants matched their win total from 2021 in Week 5 and had their best start since 2009. Brian Daboll became the first head coach to start his Giants tenure 4–1 since Tom Coughlin in 2004.

==== Week 6: vs. Baltimore Ravens ====
Week 6: Baltimore Ravens at New York Giants – Game summary

Quarter	1	2	3	4	Total
Ravens	0	10	3	7	**20**
**Giants**	0	7	3	14	**24**

at MetLife Stadium, East Rutherford, New Jersey

- Date: October 16
- Game time: 1:00 p.m. EDT
- Game weather: Fair, 60 °F (16 °C)
- Game attendance: 78,019
- Referee: Clay Martin
- TV announcers (CBS): Ian Eagle, Charles Davis and Evan Washburn
- Recap, Game Book

Game information

**First quarter**

- No scoring plays.

**Second quarter**

- BAL – Kenyan Drake 30-yard run (Justin Tucker kick), 9:26. Ravens 7–0. **Drive: 8 plays, 89 yards, 4:08.**
- NYG – Wan'Dale Robinson 5-yard pass from Daniel Jones (Graham Gano kick), 3:31. Tied 7–7. **Drive: 10 plays, 53 yards, 5:55.**
- BAL – Justin Tucker 34-yard field goal, 1:45. Ravens 10–7. **Drive: 8 plays, 59 yards, 1:46.**

**Third quarter**

- BAL – Justin Tucker 23-yard field goal, 9:41. Ravens 13–7. **Drive: 8 plays, 64 yards, 3:12.**
- NYG – Graham Gano 34-yard field goal, 2:00. Ravens 13–10. **Drive: 14 plays, 59 yards, 7:41.**

**Fourth quarter**

- BAL – Mark Andrews 12-yard pass from Lamar Jackson (Justin Tucker kick), 12:54. Ravens 20–10. **Drive: 8 plays, 75 yards, 4:06.**
- NYG – Daniel Bellinger 8-yard pass from Daniel Jones (Graham Gano kick), 6:01. Ravens 20–17. **Drive: 12 plays, 75 yards, 6:53.**
- NYG – Saquon Barkley 1-yard run (Graham Gano kick), 1:43. Giants 24–20. **Drive: 3 plays, 13 yards, 1:07.**

**Top passers**

- BAL – Lamar Jackson – 17/32, 210 yards, TD, INT
- NYG – Daniel Jones – 19/27, 173 yards, 2 TD

**Top rushers**

- BAL – Kenyan Drake – 10 rushes, 119 yards, TD
- NYG – Saquon Barkley – 22 rushes, 83 yards, TD

**Top receivers**

- BAL – Mark Andrews – 7 receptions, 106 yards, TD
- NYG – Daniel Bellinger – 5 receptions, 38 yards, TD

The Ravens started with the ball and took all four of their first half drives into Giants territory, but scored for the first time on their third drive when Kenyan Drake had a 30-yard touchdown run and added a field goal before halftime. The Giants had trouble moving the ball but scored on their third drive when Wan'Dale Robinson caught his first career touchdown pass from Daniel Jones. The Ravens led 10–7 at halftime but outgained the Giants 256 yards to 90. The teams traded field goals in the third quarter and Mark Andrews scored his first touchdown on a controversial play where Brian Daboll unsuccessfully pleaded for a delay of game. The Giants responded when Daniel Bellinger scored his first touchdown of the game with six minutes to play, and the Ravens got the ball back with a 20–17 lead.

The Ravens converted on a 3rd and 1 that had to be replayed because of an illegal formation penalty. On the ensuing play, the snap went behind Lamar Jackson who had to get the ball. Under duress, he threw an interception to Julian Love, the Giants first of the season, and Love returned the ball to the Ravens 13-yard line. On 3rd and 5, Jones threw an interception to Marcus Peters, but the referees penalized Peters for pass interference. Saquon Barkley scored the next play and the Giants led 24–20. Needing a stop to win, Kayvon Thibodeaux strip-sacked Jackson on the second play of the drive, his first in the NFL, and the Giants recovered. Jones and Barkley ran out the clock to secure the win in front of a rocking MetLife Stadium crowd.

Lamar Jackson lost to an NFC team for the first time in his career. The Giants won their third game of the season after trailing by double digits and exceeded their win total from 2021 in Week 6. Daboll became the first Giants head coach to start his career 5–1 since Dan Reeves in 1993.

==== Week 7: at Jacksonville Jaguars ====
Week 7: New York Giants at Jacksonville Jaguars – Game summary

Quarter	1	2	3	4	Total
**Giants**	7	6	0	10	**23**
Jaguars	8	3	6	0	**17**

at TIAA Bank Field, Jacksonville, Florida

- Date: October 23
- Game time: 1:00 p.m. EDT
- Game weather: Sunny, 71 °F (22 °C)
- Game attendance: 65,664
- Referee: Tra Blake
- TV announcers (Fox): Chris Myers, Mark Schlereth and Kristina Pink
- Recap, Game Book

Game information

**First quarter**

- NYG – Darius Slayton 32-yard pass from Daniel Jones (Graham Gano kick), 10:21. Giants 7–0. **Drive: 9 plays, 75 yards, 4:39.**
- JAX – Travis Etienne 7-yard run (Travis Etienne run), 6:58. Jaguars 8–7. **Drive: 6 plays, 70 yards, 3:23.**

**Second quarter**

- JAX – Riley Patterson 27-yard field goal, 13:23. Jaguars 11–7. **Drive: 12 plays, 70 yards, 5:44.**
- NYG – Graham Gano 33-yard field goal, 7:27. Jaguars 11–10. **Drive: 10 plays, 60 yards, 5:56.**
- NYG – Graham Gano 33-yard field goal, 0:28. Giants 13–11. **Drive: 12 plays, 65 yards, 2:58.**

**Third quarter**

- JAX – Trevor Lawrence 1-yard run (kick blocked), 11:45. Jaguars 17–13. **Drive: 7 plays, 73 yards, 3:15.**

**Fourth quarter**

- NYG – Daniel Jones 1-yard run (Graham Gano kick), 5:31. Giants 20–17. **Drive: 10 plays, 79 yards, 5:54.**
- NYG – Graham Gano 34-yard field goal, 1:04. Giants 23–17. **Drive: 9 plays, 61 yards, 3:25.**

**Top passers**

- NYG – Daniel Jones – 19/30, 202 yards, TD
- JAX – Trevor Lawrence – 22/43, 310 yards

**Top rushers**

- NYG – Saquon Barkley – 24 rushes, 110 yards
- JAX – Travis Etienne – 14 rushes, 114 yards, TD

**Top receivers**

- NYG – Darius Slayton – 3 receptions, 58 yards, TD
- JAX – Christian Kirk – 7 receptions, 96 yards

The Giants were trailing 11–10 in the second quarter after losing two offensive linemen. Jacksonville was driving and looking to take control of the game, but Travis Etienne, who scored his first career touchdown in the first quarter, fumbled the ball after being hit by Xavier McKinney on the 5-yard line and the Giants recovered. After taking the lead with a field goal before halftime, the Jaguars responded to the Giants by scoring a touchdown on their first drive of the second half to take a 17–13 lead. The Giants drove the ball in goal-to-go territory but were stopped by the Jaguars defense on 4th down. In the 4th quarter, Trevor Lawrence was driving the Jaguars into field goal range, but he too was stopped on 4th down. Daniel Jones responded with a 10-play, 79-yard drive which he capped off with a quarterback sneak touchdown to give the Giants a 20–17 lead. The Giants got the ball back and tried to run the clock out, but Saquon Barkley was ruled out of bounds upon video review following a critical 3rd down play. The Giants kicked a field goal to take a 23–17 lead, but gave the ball back to the Jaguars with 1:04 to play. Lawrence converted on a 4th down for the Jaguars and was aided by a roughing the passer penalty by his former Clemson teammate Dexter Lawrence, putting them in the red zone. Two plays later with 0:07 to play, Lawrence completed a pass to Christian Kirk on the 1-yard line, who was immediately hit by Fabian Moreau. Kirk tried to battle for the goal line, but a swarm of Giants collapsed on him and made the tackle as the clock expired, and the Giants won 23–17.

Daniel Jones orchestrated his fifth game-winning drive of the season and had a career high 107 rushing yards, the first by a Giants quarterback since 1946. He was selected as the NFC Offensive Player of the Week for his performance. The Giants 6–1 start was their best since 2008 and Brian Daboll's 6–1 record was the best start by a Giants head coach since LeRoy Andrews in 1929.

==== Week 8: at Seattle Seahawks ====
Week 8: New York Giants at Seattle Seahawks – Game summary

Quarter	1	2	3	4	Total
Giants	0	7	3	3	**13**
**Seahawks**	0	10	3	14	**27**

at Lumen Field, Seattle, Washington

- Date: October 30
- Game time: 4:25 p.m. EDT/1:25 p.m. PDT
- Game weather: Rain, 54 °F (12 °C)
- Game attendance: 68,921
- Referee: Jerome Boger
- TV announcers (Fox): Kevin Kugler, Mark Sanchez and Laura Okmin
- Recap, Game Book

Game information

**First quarter**

- No scoring plays.

**Second quarter**

- SEA – DK Metcalf 3-yard pass from Geno Smith (Jason Myers kick), 12:07. Seahawks 7–0. **Drive: 15 plays, 69 yards, 5:55.**
- NYG – Saquon Barkley 1-yard run (Graham Gano kick), 5:51. Tied 7–7. **Drive: 2 plays, 2 yards, 0:39.**
- SEA – Jason Myers 35-yard field goal, 1:38. Seahawks 10–7. **Drive: 4 plays, 2 yards, 0:45.**

**Third quarter**

- NYG – Graham Gano 31-yard field goal, 6:04. Tied 10–10. **Drive: 14 plays, 79 yards, 8:56.**
- SEA – Jason Myers 51-yard field goal, 2:42. Seahawks 13–10. **Drive: 7 plays, 42 yards, 3:22.**

**Fourth quarter**

- NYG – Graham Gano 45-yard field goal, 11:17. Tied 13–13. **Drive: 12 plays, 45 yards, 6:25.**
- SEA – Tyler Lockett 33-yard pass from Geno Smith (Jason Myers kick), 9:18. Seahawks 20–13. **Drive: 5 plays, 75 yards, 1:59.**
- SEA – Kenneth Walker III 16-yard run (Jason Myers kick), 5:22. Seahawks 27–13. **Drive: 2 plays, 32 yards, 0:42.**

**Top passers**

- NYG – Daniel Jones – 17/31, 176 yards
- SEA – Geno Smith – 23/34, 212 yards, 2 TD

**Top rushers**

- NYG – Saquon Barkley – 20 rushes, 53 yards, TD
- SEA – Kenneth Walker III – 18 rushes, 51 yards, TD

**Top receivers**

- NYG – Darius Slayton – 5 receptions, 66 yards
- SEA – Tyler Lockett – 5 receptions, 63 yards, TD

The Giants went 3-and-out on their first 3 possessions then Saquon Barkley scored a touchdown on a drive set up by Adoree' Jackson stripping Tyler Lockett at the Seahawks 2-yard line. Richie James returned the favor and fumbled a punt return, which the Seahawks cashed in with a field goal and a 10–7 halftime lead. On the Seahawks opening drive of the second half, Lockett dropped a wide open touchdown and the Seahawks settled for another field goal, which the Giants again responded to, tying the game 13–13. Lockett didn't miss his next opportunity in the 4th quarter when Geno Smith found him for the touchdown to give the Seahawks a 20–13 lead. Later, James fumbled a second punt return, and then Kenneth Walker III delivered the knockout blow. The Giants lost 27–13 heading into their bye week and fell to 3rd place in the division after being the only NFC East team to lose in Week 8.

==== Week 10: vs. Houston Texans ====
Week 10: Houston Texans at New York Giants – Game summary

Quarter	1	2	3	4	Total
Texans	0	3	7	6	**16**
**Giants**	7	0	14	3	**24**

at MetLife Stadium, East Rutherford, New Jersey

- Date: November 13
- Game time: 1:00 p.m. EST
- Game weather: Partly sunny, 50 °F (10 °C)
- Game attendance: 71,615
- Referee: Bill Vinovich
- TV announcers (CBS): Ian Eagle, Charles Davis and Evan Washburn
- Recap, Game Book

Game information

**First quarter**

- NYG – Lawrence Cager 9-yard pass from Daniel Jones (Graham Gano kick), 7:51. Giants 7–0. **Drive: 10 plays, 68 yards, 5:22.**

**Second quarter**

- HOU – Kaʻimi Fairbairn 38-yard field goal, 11:27. Giants 7–3. **Drive: 7 plays, 61 yards, 3:26.**

**Third quarter**

- NYG – Darius Slayton 54-yard pass from Daniel Jones (Graham Gano kick), 12:33. Giants 14–3. **Drive: 5 plays, 75 yards, 2:27.**
- HOU – Nico Collins 12-yard pass from Davis Mills (Kaʻimi Fairbairn kick), 8:06. Giants 14–10. **Drive: 7 plays, 75 yards, 4:27.**
- NYG – Saquon Barkley 2-yard run (Graham Gano kick), 2:21. Giants 21–10. **Drive: 12 plays, 74 yards, 5:45.**

**Fourth quarter**

- HOU – Kaʻimi Fairbairn 34-yard field goal, 2:22. Giants 21–13. **Drive: 12 plays, 76 yards, 2:18.**
- NYG – Graham Gano 49-yard field goal, 1:55. Giants 24–13. **Drive: 4 plays, 8 yards, 0:27.**
- HOU – Kaʻimi Fairbairn 46-yard field goal, 0:07. Giants 24–16. **Drive: 5 plays, 48 yards, 1:48.**

**Top passers**

- HOU – Davis Mills – 22/37, 319 yards, TD, INT
- NYG – Daniel Jones – 13/17, 197 yards, 2 TD

**Top rushers**

- HOU – Dameon Pierce – 17 rushes, 94 yards
- NYG – Saquon Barkley – 35 rushes, 152 yards, TD

**Top rushers**

- HOU – Jordan Akins – 3 receptions, 72 yards
- NYG – Darius Slayton – 3 receptions, 95 yards, TD

Tight end Lawrence Cager came off the practice squad and scored his first career touchdown on the Giants' opening drive. The Giants were offensively in control but penalties and dropped passes stopped them from scoring again in the half. The Texans only had 86 yards in the first half, but 44 of them came on a run play by Dameon Pierce which set up a field goal and 7–3 halftime score.

Both offenses found their grooves in the third quarter. First, Texans rookie safety Jalen Pitre missed a tackle on Darius Slayton, who ran to the end zone for a Giants 54-yard touchdown. Nico Collins then caught a 12-yard touchdown pass to cut the Texans deficit to 4, then Saquon Barkley scored on the Giants next drive. The Texans drove into goal-to-go territory as the quarter drew to a close, but the Giants defense had two red zone takeaways in the fourth. Leonard Williams forced a fumble on the 2nd play, then rookie Dane Belton had his first career interception to stop the Texans next scoring threat. The teams only combined to score a series of field goals which was enough for the Giants to hold on for the win.

The Giants won 24–16 to improve to 7–2 with every win coming by one possession. Their seven wins were the most since 2016. Saquon Barkley finished with 152 rushing yards, and Daniel Jones had a 153.3 passer rating, a new career high. The Giants moved back into second place in the NFC East after the Cowboys lost later that day.

==== Week 11: vs. Detroit Lions ====
Week 11: Detroit Lions at New York Giants – Game summary

Quarter	1	2	3	4	Total
**Lions**	3	14	7	7	**31**
Giants	6	0	0	12	**18**

at MetLife Stadium, East Rutherford, New Jersey

- Date: November 20
- Game time: 1:00 p.m. EST
- Game weather: Fair and breezy, 35 °F (2 °C)
- Game attendance: 76,267
- Referee: Brad Rogers
- TV announcers (Fox): Kevin Burkhardt, Greg Olsen and Erin Andrews
- Recap, Game Book

Game information

**First quarter**

- DET – Michael Badgley 24-yard field goal, 7:52. Lions 3–0. **Drive: 11 plays, 64 yards, 5:06.**
- NYG – Daniel Jones 3-yard run (Graham Gano kick blocked), 2:41. Giants 6–3. **Drive: 11 plays, 75 yards, 5:11.**

**Second quarter**

- DET – Jamaal Williams 4-yard run (Michael Badgley kick), 4:38. Lions 10–6. **Drive: 3 plays, 18 yards, 1:31.**
- DET – Jamaal Williams 1-yard run (Michael Badgley kick), 0:54. Lions 17–6. **Drive: 7 plays, 68 yards, 1:25.**

**Third quarter**

- DET – Jamaal Williams 1-yard run (Michael Badgley kick), 10:10. Lions 24–6. **Drive: 9 plays, 56 yards, 4:50.**

**Fourth quarter**

- NYG – Matt Breida 3-yard run (kick failed), 13:21. Lions 24–12. **Drive: 9 plays, 67 yards, 3:01.**
- DET – D'Andre Swift 4-yard run (Michael Badgley kick), 6:10. Lions 31–12. **Drive: 4 plays, 33 yards, 1:43.**
- NYG – Richie James 9-yard pass from Daniel Jones (pass failed), 4:20. Lions 31–18. **Drive: 6 plays, 75 yards, 1:50.**

**Top passers**

- DET – Jared Goff – 17/26, 165 yards
- NYG – Daniel Jones – 27/44, 341 yards, TD, 2 INT

**Top rushers**

- DET – Justin Jackson – 9 rushes, 66 yards
- NYG – Daniel Jones – 7 rushes, 50 yards, TD

**Top receivers**

- DET – Amon-Ra St. Brown – 7 receptions, 76 yards
- NYG – Wan'Dale Robinson – 9 receptions, 100 yards

The Lions won the coin toss and deferred. With the Giants leading 6–3 in the 2nd quarter, Daniel Jones threw a pass which #2 overall pick Aidan Hutchinson intercepted and set up a Jamaal Williams touchdown run for the Lions. The Lions capitalized on two more touchdown drives, both scored by Williams, on both sides of the half to extend their lead to 24–6 early in the 3rd quarter. The Giants tried to battle back into the game, but another Jones interception in the 3rd quarter and Isaiah Hodgins catch and fumble in the 4th quarter ruined any chances for the Giants to make a comeback.

Jamaal Williams had 3 of 4 Lions rushing touchdowns, taking the NFL lead with his 12th of the season. The Giants lost 6 players to injury and fell back to 3rd place in the NFC East after the Cowboys beat the Vikings later that day.

==== Week 12: at Dallas Cowboys ====
Thanksgiving Day games

Week 12: New York Giants at Dallas Cowboys – Game summary

Quarter	1	2	3	4	Total
Giants	3	10	0	7	**20**
**Cowboys**	0	7	14	7	**28**

at AT&T Stadium, Arlington, Texas

- Date: November 24
- Game time: 4:30 p.m. EST/3:30 p.m. CST
- Game weather: None (retractable roof closed)
- Game attendance: 93,568
- Referee: Scott Novak
- TV announcers (Fox): Kevin Burkhardt, Greg Olsen, Tom Rinaldi and Erin Andrews
- Recap, Game Book

Game information

**First quarter**

- NYG – Graham Gano 57-yard field goal, 9:44. Giants 3–0. **Drive: 5 plays, 1 yard, 1:51.**

**Second quarter**

- DAL – Ezekiel Elliott 6-yard run (Brett Maher kick), 14:55. Cowboys 7–3. **Drive: 11 plays, 93 yards, 6:03.**
- NYG – Saquon Barkley 1-yard run (Graham Gano kick), 9:28. Giants 10–7. **Drive: 9 plays, 75 yards, 5:27.**
- NYG – Graham Gano 47-yard field goal, 0:00. Giants 13–7. **Drive: 8 plays, 44 yards, 1:50.**

**Third quarter**

- DAL – Dalton Schultz 15-yard pass from Dak Prescott (Brett Maher kick), 7:21. Cowboys 14–13. **Drive: 14 plays, 75 yards, 7:39.**
- DAL – Dalton Schultz 6-yard pass from Dak Prescott (Brett Maher kick), 2:02. Cowboys 21–13. **Drive: 6 plays, 44 yards, 2:05.**

**Fourth quarter**

- DAL – Peyton Hendershot 2-yard run (Brett Maher kick), 8:53. Cowboys 28–13. **Drive: 10 plays, 80 yards, 5:51.**
- NYG – Richie James 1-yard pass from Daniel Jones (Graham Gano kick), 0:08. Cowboys 28–20. **Drive: 7 plays, 64 yards, 1:05.**

**Top passers**

- NYG – Daniel Jones – 21/35, 228 yards, TD
- DAL – Dak Prescott – 21/30, 261 yards, 2 TD, 2 INT

**Top rushers**

- NYG – Saquon Barkley – 11 rushes, 39 yards, TD
- DAL – Ezekiel Elliott – 16 rushes, 92 yards, TD

**Top receivers**

- NYG – Darius Slayton – 3 receptions, 63 yards
- DAL – CeeDee Lamb – 6 receptions, 106 yards

The Giants only scored 3 points from two Dallas turnovers on their first two drives - the latter turnover being the first career interception for Rodarius Williams - after a touchdown was called off by a penalty. Trailing 7–3, Saquon Barkley scored the Giants first offensive touchdown on Thanksgiving Day since 1938 and took a 13–7 halftime lead into the locker room. Dallas stormed back in the third quarter when Dalton Schultz caught two touchdown passes from Dak Prescott and the Giants failed to convert on a 4th and 1. The Cowboys put the game away with a touchdown run by backup tight end Peyton Hendershot. Richie James scored a late touchdown to make the final score 28–20 Cowboys.

The Cowboys won their first Thanksgiving Day game since 2018 and won 16 of the last 20 meetings against the Giants dating back to 2013. The Giants lost consecutive games for the first time in 2022 and their fourth consecutive Thanksgiving Day game dating back to 1992.

==== Week 13: vs. Washington Commanders ====
Week 13: Washington Commanders at New York Giants – Game summary

Quarter	1	2	3	4	OT	Total
Commanders	10	3	0	7	0	**20**
Giants	0	13	7	0	0	**20**

at MetLife Stadium, East Rutherford, New Jersey

- Date: December 4
- Game time: 1:00 p.m. EST
- Game weather: Fair, 44 °F (7 °C)
- Game attendance: 76,128
- Referee: Brad Allen
- TV announcers (Fox): Kenny Albert, Jonathan Vilma and Shannon Spake
- Recap, Game Book

Game information

**First quarter**

- WAS – Joey Slye 21-yard field goal, 8:39. Commanders 3–0. **Drive: 10 plays, 45 yards, 4:27.**
- WAS – Terry McLaurin 19-yard pass from Taylor Heinicke (Joey Slye kick), 2:27. Commanders 10–0. **Drive: 8 plays, 62 yards, 4:04.**

**Second quarter**

- NYG – Graham Gano 48-yard field goal, 13:38. Commanders 10–3. **Drive: 8 plays, 45 yards, 3:49.**
- NYG – Saquon Barkley 13-yard run (Graham Gano kick), 8:49. Tied 10–10. **Drive: 5 plays, 81 yards, 2:38.**
- WAS – Joey Slye 42-yard field goal, 2:28. Commanders 13–10. **Drive: 12 plays, 51 yards, 6:21.**
- NYG – Graham Gano 27-yard field goal, 0:02. Tied 13–13. **Drive: 13 plays, 66 yards, 2:26.**

**Third quarter**

- NYG – Isaiah Hodgins 6-yard pass from Daniel Jones (Graham Gano kick), 11:34. Giants 20–13. **Drive: 5 plays, 20 yards, 2:37.**

**Fourth quarter**

- WAS – Jahan Dotson 28-yard pass from Taylor Heinicke (Joey Slye kick), 1:45. Tied 20–20. **Drive: 8 plays, 90 yards, 1:58.**

**Overtime**

- No scoring plays.

**Top passers**

- WAS – Taylor Heinicke – 27/41, 275 yards, 2 TD
- NYG – Daniel Jones – 25/31, 200 yards, TD

**Top rushers**

- WAS – Brian Robinson Jr. – 21 rushes, 96 yards
- NYG – Daniel Jones – 12 rushes, 71 yards

**Top receivers**

- WAS – Terry McLaurin – 8 receptions, 105 yards, TD
- NYG – Darius Slayton – 6 receptions, 90 yards

Daniel Jones had a fumble on the opening drive which Joey Slye converted with a field goal, then Terry McLaurin scored on the next Commanders drive to take an early 10–0 lead. The Giants responded with 10 points on their next two drives to tie the game, then the teams traded a pair of field goals to tie 13–13 at halftime. Azeez Ojulari, in his first game back from injury, strip-sacked Taylor Heinicke and recovered the ball setting the Giants up in the red zone to begin the 3rd quarter. Jones converted with a touchdown pass to Isaiah Hodgins, the first in his career. Late in the 4th quarter, Darius Slayton made a first down catch and putting the Giants closer to field goal range to put the game out of reach, but the play was nullified by a taunting penalty by center Jon Feliciano and the drive stalled. On the next Commanders drive, Heinicke evaded a sack and converted on a 4th & 4 which led to a game-tying touchdown by Jahan Dotson. The game then reverted to a defensive stalemate with both teams exchanging punts in the final 1:45 of the 4th quarter and two punts each during overtime. The Giants ended with the ball and got in position to attempt a game-winning 58-yard field goal with 5 seconds left, but Graham Gano's kick fell short.

The Giants tied for the first time since 1997, which was also against Washington. This was their first tie game at home since their final game at Yankee Stadium in 1973, which was the year before the NFL added overtime.

==== Week 14: vs. Philadelphia Eagles ====
Week 14: Philadelphia Eagles at New York Giants – Game summary

Quarter	1	2	3	4	Total
**Eagles**	7	17	10	14	**48**
Giants	0	7	7	8	**22**

at MetLife Stadium, East Rutherford, New Jersey

- Date: December 11
- Game time: 1:00 p.m. EST
- Game weather: Overcast, 37 °F (3 °C)
- Game attendance: 81,506
- Referee: Clete Blakeman
- TV announcers (Fox): Joe Davis, Daryl Johnston and Pam Oliver
- Recap, Game Book

Game information

**First quarter**

- PHI – Miles Sanders 3-yard run (Jake Elliott kick), 4:14. Eagles 7–0. **Drive: 14 plays, 84 yards, 8:05.**

**Second quarter**

- PHI – DeVonta Smith 41-yard pass from Jalen Hurts (Jake Elliott kick), 12:05. Eagles 14–0. **Drive: 12 plays, 91 yards, 4:55.**
- PHI – A. J. Brown 33-yard pass from Jalen Hurts (Jake Elliott kick), 8:16. Eagles 21–0. **Drive: 1 play, 33 yards, 0:08.**
- NYG – Isaiah Hodgins 2-yard pass from Daniel Jones (Graham Gano kick), 2:57. Eagles 21–7. **Drive: 3 plays, 15 yards, 1:18.**
- PHI – Jake Elliott 29-yard field goal, 0:54. Eagles 24–7. **Drive: 6 plays, 24 yards, 2:03.**

**Third quarter**

- PHI – Jake Elliott 39-yard field goal, 11:21. Eagles 27–7. **Drive: 8 plays, 63 yards, 3:39.**
- NYG – Daniel Jones 1-yard run (Graham Gano kick), 5:40. Eagles 27–14. **Drive: 11 plays, 75 yards, 5:41.**
- PHI – Jalen Hurts 10-yard run (Jake Elliott kick), 1:41. Eagles 34–14. **Drive: 8 plays, 63 yards, 3:59.**

**Fourth quarter**

- PHI – Miles Sanders 40-yard run (Jake Elliott kick), 6:01. Eagles 41–14. **Drive: 7 plays, 76 yards, 3:57.**
- PHI – Boston Scott 3-yard run (Jake Elliott kick), 3:09. Eagles 48–14. **Drive: 4 plays, 23 yards, 2:21.**
- NYG – Richie James 19-yard pass from Tyrod Taylor (Taylor–Hodgins pass), 0:39. Eagles 48–22. **Drive: 9 plays, 75 yards, 2:30.**

**Top passers**

- PHI – Jalen Hurts – 21/31, 217 yards, 2 TD
- NYG – Daniel Jones – 18/27, 169 yards, TD

**Top rushers**

- PHI – Miles Sanders – 17 rushes, 144 yards, 2 TD
- NYG – Tyrod Taylor – 2 rushes, 40 yards

**Top receivers**

- PHI – A. J. Brown – 4 receptions, 70 yards, TD
- NYG – Richie James – 7 receptions, 61 yards, TD

The Eagles scored touchdowns on their opening three drives - the second a 41-yard catch by DeVonta Smith on a 4th and 7 - and the Giants failed to match that output all game. They fell to 7–5–1 but held on to the 7th seed when the Seahawks lost to the Panthers later that day.

==== Week 15: at Washington Commanders ====
Week 15: New York Giants at Washington Commanders – Game summary

Quarter	1	2	3	4	Total
**Giants**	0	14	3	3	**20**
Commanders	3	0	6	3	**12**

at FedExField, Landover, Maryland

- Date: December 18
- Game time: 8:20 p.m. EST
- Game weather: Cloudy, 34 °F (1 °C)
- Game attendance: 61,917
- Referee: John Hussey
- TV announcers (NBC): Mike Tirico, Cris Collinsworth and Melissa Stark
- Recap, Game Book

Game information

**First quarter**

- WAS - Joey Slye 41-yard field goal, 2:51. Commanders 3–0. **Drive: 9 plays, 47 yards, 4:52.**

**Second quarter**

- NYG - Kayvon Thibodeaux 1-yard fumble return (Graham Gano kick), 13:10. Giants 7–3.
- NYG - Saquon Barkley 3-yard rush (Graham Gano kick), 1:43. Giants 14–3. **Drive: 18 plays, 97 yards, 8:35.**

**Third quarter**

- WAS - Jahan Dotson 19-yard pass from Taylor Heinicke (kick failed), 8:38. Giants 14–9. **Drive: 6 plays, 91 yards, 4:11.**
- NYG - Graham Gano 50-yard field goal, 3:11. Giants 17–9. **Drive: 10 plays, 43 yards, 5:27.**

**Fourth quarter**

- WAS - Joey Slye 51-yard field goal, 12:31. Giants 17–12. **Drive: 7 plays, 25 yards, 2:51.**
- NYG - Graham Gano 50-yard field goal, 1:55. Giants 20–12. **Drive: 9 plays, 54 yards, 4:11.**

**Top passers**

- NYG - Daniel Jones - 21/32, 160 yards
- WAS - Taylor Heinicke - 17/29, 249 yards, 1 TD

**Top rushers**

- NYG - Saquon Barkley - 18 carries, 87 yards, 1 TD
- WAS - Brian Robinson - 12 carries, 89 yards

**Top receivers**

- NYG - Richie James - 4 receptions, 42 yards
- WAS - Jahan Dotson - 4 receptions, 105 yards, 1 TD

The NFL flexed this game into primetime after the Week 13 tie. Kayvon Thibodeaux was dominant in the first half with 3 tackles for a loss in the first quarter, and then a strip-sack, recovery, and touchdown all on the same play early in the second quarter. Later in the quarter, Daniel Jones led the Giants on an 18-play, 97-yard, 8-minute drive which included key 3rd and 9 and 4th and 9 conversions to Richie James. Saquon Barkley cashed in with a 3-yard run to end the drive and give the Giants a 14–3 halftime lead. Taylor Heinicke connected with Jahan Dotson on the Commanders opening drive of the 3rd quarter to make the score 14–9. Heinicke again connected with Dotson in the 4th quarter on a 61-yard pass play to put the Commanders in prime scoring territory, but was sacked by Dexter Lawrence. The replay showed the ball was coming out before Heinicke touched the ground, and Brian Daboll successfully challenged the call. Jones and Barkley primarily ran the ball into field goal range and Graham Gano converted his second 50-yard field goal of the half to give the Giants a 20–12 lead with 1:55 to play. Like two weeks prior, Heinicke again drove the Commanders into the red zone with the game on the line. On 2nd and goal, Heinicke flushed the pocket and rolled right to run to the pylon but was stopped by Thibodeaux, who originally dropped back into coverage, on the 1-yard line. Brian Robinson had a touchdown on 3rd and goal, but Terry McLaurin - who twice checked with the line judge to make sure he was set - was penalized for illegal formation and replayed down resulted in an incomplete pass. On 4th & Goal, Heinicke threw a pass to Curtis Samuel which was batted down by Darnay Holmes, giving the Giants the ball back and the victory. Holmes appeared to be holding Samuel, but a penalty wasn't called.

The Giants snapped their 4-game winless streak and improved to 8–5–1, winning their first primetime game in four years, and put themselves in prime position to clinch a playoff spot with three games to play. The win also ensured the Giants would not have a losing record for the first time since 2016, and defeated Washington for the 105th time - the most wins versus a single opponent in NFL history. Kayvon Thibodeaux finished with 12 tackles, 3 tackles for a loss, 1 sack, 1 forced fumble, 1 fumble recovery, and 1 touchdown, and was named the NFC Defensive Player of the Week for his performance.

==== Week 16: at Minnesota Vikings ====
Week 16: New York Giants at Minnesota Vikings – Game summary

Quarter	1	2	3	4	Total
Giants	0	7	6	11	**24**
**Vikings**	7	3	0	17	**27**

at U.S. Bank Stadium, Minneapolis, Minnesota

- Date: December 24
- Game time: 1:00 p.m. EST/12:00 p.m. CST
- Game weather: None (indoor stadium)
- Game attendance: 66,919
- Referee: Adrian Hill
- TV announcers (Fox): Adam Amin, Mark Schlereth, and Kristina Pink
- Recap, Game Book

Game information

**First quarter**

- MIN – T. J. Hockenson 12-yard pass from Kirk Cousins (Greg Joseph kick), 3:17. Vikings 7–0. **Drive: 8 plays, 84 yards, 3:50.**

**Second quarter**

- MIN – Greg Joseph 40-yard field goal, 9:40. Vikings 10–0. **Drive: 10 plays, 42 yards, 5:10.**
- NYG – Isaiah Hodgins 7-yard pass from Daniel Jones (Graham Gano kick), 4:23. Vikings 10–7. **Drive: 10 plays, 69 yards, 5:17.**

**Third quarter**

- NYG – Graham Gano 44-yard field goal, 11:18. Tied 10–10. **Drive: 8 plays, 49 yards, 3:42.**
- NYG – Graham Gano 44-yard field goal, 4:31. Giants 13–10. **Drive: 8 plays, 55 yards, 4:42.**

**Fourth quarter**

- MIN – T. J. Hockenson 15-yard pass from Kirk Cousins (Greg Joseph kick), 14:12. Vikings 17–13. **Drive: 12 plays, 75 yards, 5:19.**
- NYG – Graham Gano 55-yard field goal, 6:24. Vikings 17–16. **Drive: 6 plays, 18 yards, 2:31.**
- MIN – Justin Jefferson 17-yard pass from Kirk Cousins (Greg Joseph kick), 3:00. Vikings 24–16. **Drive: 5 plays, 29 yards, 1:02.**
- NYG – Saquon Barkley 27-yard run (Daniel Jones–Daniel Bellinger pass), 2:01. Tied 24–24. **Drive: 7 plays, 75 yards, 0:59.**
- MIN – Greg Joseph 61-yard field goal, 0:00. Vikings 27–24. **Drive: 8 plays, 33 yards, 2:01.**

**Top passers**

- NYG – Daniel Jones – 30/42, 334 yards, TD, INT
- MIN – Kirk Cousins – 34/48, 299 yards, 3 TD

**Top rushers**

- NYG – Saquon Barkley – 14 rushes, 84 yards, TD
- MIN – Dalvin Cook – 14 rushes, 64 yards

**Top receivers**

- NYG – Richie James – 8 receptions, 90 yards
- MIN – Justin Jefferson – 12 receptions, 133 yards, TD

The Vikings won the preview of the playoff game played three weeks later. T. J. Hockenson, who would have big games in both matchups, struck first with a late 1st quarter touchdown. The Giants were driving but Vikings linebacker Brian Asamoah stripped Daniel Bellinger and the Vikings cashed in with a field goal. The Giants offense responded when Isaiah Hodgins capped off a touchdown drive and the Vikings led 10–7 at halftime. Graham Gano converted two 44-yard field goals for the Giants in the third quarter and the Giants led 13–10 going into the fourth.

Hockenson scored his second touchdown of the day to start the quarter. The Giants drive stalled when Richie James dropped a third down pass, but Gano converted a 55-yard field goal, his third of the game. After exchanging drives, Jamie Gillan's punt was blocked and the Vikings recovered in scoring range. Kirk Cousins threw his third touchdown pass of the game to Justin Jefferson with 3:00 remaining. The Vikings opted to kick the extra point and led 24–16. The Giants scored 59 seconds later when Saquon Barkley had a 27-yard run on 4th & 2. They tied the game when Daniel Jones hit Bellinger for the two-point conversion. The Vikings methodically drove down the field with two third down conversions, and kicker Greg Joseph hit a franchise record 61-yard field goal as time expired. The Vikings won 27–24 and Kirk Cousins tied Matthew Stafford's NFL record with his 8th game-winning drive of the season. The Giants lost on a 60+ yard game-winning field goal as time expired for the third time in six seasons. The Giants fell 8–3–1 in one-score games while the Vikings improved to an NFL-record 11–0 on the season in one-score games. Despite falling to 8–6–1 overall, the Giants maintained pole position in the NFC wild card race when the Commanders, Seahawks and Lions also lost.

==== Week 17: vs. Indianapolis Colts ====
Week 17: Indianapolis Colts at New York Giants – Game summary

Quarter	1	2	3	4	Total
Colts	3	0	7	0	**10**
**Giants**	0	24	7	7	**38**

at MetLife Stadium, East Rutherford, New Jersey

- Date: January 1
- Game time: 1:00 p.m. EST
- Game weather: Fair, 53 °F (12 °C)
- Game attendance: 77,399
- Referee: Craig Wrolstad
- TV announcers (CBS): Kevin Harlan, Trent Green and Melanie Collins
- Recap, Game Book

Game information

**First quarter**

- IND - Chase McLaughlin 23-yard field goal, 2:26. Colts 3–0. **Drive: 9 plays, 75 yards, 5:50.**

**Second quarter**

- NYG - Richie James 6-yard pass from Daniel Jones (Graham Gano kick), 10:38. Giants 7–3. **Drive: 11 plays, 71 yards, 6:48.**
- NYG - Isaiah Hodgins 6-yard pass from Daniel Jones (Graham Gano kick), 4:21. Giants 14–3. **Drive: 9 plays, 64 yards, 4:49.**
- NYG - Landon Collins 52-yard interception return (Graham Gano kick), 1:45. Giants 21–3.
- NYG - Graham Gano 36-yard field goal, 0:00. Giants 24–3. **Drive: 9 plays, 43 yards, 0:46.**

**Third quarter**

- NYG - Daniel Jones 18-yard rush (Graham Gano kick), 10:40, Giants 31–3. **Drive: 6 plays, 62 yards, 3:19.**
- IND - Michael Pittman Jr. 6-yard pass from Sam Ehlinger, 2:08. Giants 31–10. **Drive: 16 plays, 68 yards, 8:32.**

**Fourth quarter**

- NYG - Daniel Jones 10-yard rush (Graham Gano kick), 11:57. Giants 38–10. **Drive: 8 plays, 70 yards, 5:11.**

**Top passers**

- IND - Nick Foles - 8/13, 81 yards, INT
- NYG - Daniel Jones - 19/24, 177 yards, 2 TD

**Top rushers**

- IND - Zack Moss - 15 carries, 74 yards
- NYG - Daniel Jones - 11 carries, 91 yards, 2 TD

**Top receivers**

- IND - Parris Campbell - 3 receptions, 52 yards
- NYG - Richie James - 7 receptions, 76 yards, 1 TD

With the win, and Washington's loss to Cleveland, the Giants swept the AFC South (5-0 against the AFC) and they clinched their first playoff berth since 2016. New York also clinched the #6 seed in the NFC and finished 5-3-1 at home. Their 28-point win was the Giants' largest in ten years, and the offense scored 30 points for the first time in 50 games. Brian Daboll became the sixth Giants head coach to clinch a playoff berth in his first season with the team and the first since Ben McAdoo in 2016.

The Giants erupted with 24 points in the second quarter; Daniel Jones had two passing touchdowns then Landon Collins returned an interception for a touchdown. Jones added two more touchdowns with his legs in the second half, and it was the first game since his NFL debut that he finished with two passing and two rushing touchdowns.

This would end up being the final home win for Daniel Jones during his Giants tenure, as he was 0-2 at home in 2023 before suffering a season-ending ACL tear, and 0-5 in 2024 before being released during the team's bye week that season. He would finish with a career record of 12-22-1 at home as a Giant.

As of 2025, this remains the last time the Giants had qualified for the postseason. In addition, this only marked the second time since 2011 the Giants clinched a playoff berth.

==== Week 18: at Philadelphia Eagles ====
Week 18: New York Giants at Philadelphia Eagles – Game summary

Quarter	1	2	3	4	Total
Giants	0	0	3	13	**16**
**Eagles**	10	6	3	3	**22**

at Lincoln Financial Field, Philadelphia, Pennsylvania

- Date: January 8
- Game time: 4:25 p.m. EST
- Game weather: Partly cloudy, 42 °F (6 °C)
- Game attendance: 69,879
- Referee: Carl Cheffers
- TV announcers (CBS): Ian Eagle, Charles Davis and Evan Washburn
- Recap, Game Book

Game information

**First quarter**

- PHI – Jake Elliott 32-yard field goal, 11:39. Eagles 3–0. **Drive: 7 plays, 51 yards, 1:48.**
- PHI – Boston Scott 8-yard run (Jake Elliott kick), 4:14. Eagles 10–0. **Drive: 12 plays, 80 yards, 6:27.**

**Second quarter**

- PHI – Jake Elliott 52-yard field goal, 10:22. Eagles 13–0. **Drive: 4 plays, 5 yards, 1:31.**
- PHI – Jake Elliott 39-yard field goal, 0:45. Eagles 16–0. **Drive: 14 plays, 59 yards, 5:15.**

**Third quarter**

- PHI – Jake Elliott 54-yard field goal, 6:17. Eagles 19–0. **Drive: 7 plays, 36 yards, 2:41.**
- NYG – Graham Gano 24-yard field goal, 0:50. Eagles 19–3. **Drive: 9 plays, 69 yards, 5:27.**

**Fourth quarter**

- NYG – Davis Webb 14-yard run (pass failed), 10:04. Eagles 19–9. **Drive: 10 plays, 59 yards, 4:46.**
- PHI – Jake Elliott 22-yard field goal, 3:21. Eagles 22–9. **Drive: 15 plays, 71 yards, 6:43.**
- NYG – Kenny Golladay 25-yard pass from Davis Webb (Graham Gano kick), 1:38. Eagles 22–16. **Drive: 7 plays, 54 yards, 1:43.**

**Top passers**

- NYG – Davis Webb – 23/40, 168 yards, TD
- PHI – Jalen Hurts – 20/35, 229 yards, INT

**Top rushers**

- NYG – Gary Brightwell – 11 rushes, 60 yards
- PHI – Boston Scott – 9 rushes, 54 yards, TD

**Top receivers**

- NYG – Lawrence Cager – 8 receptions, 69 yards
- PHI – A. J. Brown – 4 receptions, 95 yards

The Giants rested their starters having already secured the #6 seed in the NFC playoffs and third string QB Davis Webb made his first career NFL start. The Eagles jumped to a 19–0 lead in the third quarter and hung on to win 22–16, therefore winning the NFC East and securing the #1 seed and first-round bye.

In the first quarter, Boston Scott had his 17th career touchdown - including his 10th against the Giants - and A. J. Brown set the Eagles franchise receiving record.

In the fourth quarter, Davis Webb scored his first career NFL touchdown, a 14-yard run. He threw his first career touchdown pass to Kenny Golladay - his first touchdown reception as a Giant - in the closing minutes of the game.

Because the Giants beat the Vikings the next week in the Wild Card round, this game was ultimately a playoff preview of the Divisional Round matchup to be played between the teams 13 days later.

With the loss, New York finished the regular season 9-7-1 (1-4-1 against the NFC East) and 4-4 on the road.

=== Standings ===
==== Division ====
NFC East
	W	L	T	PCT	DIV	CONF	PF	PA	STK
^{(1)} Philadelphia Eagles	14	3	0	.824	4–2	9–3	477	344	W1
^{(5)} Dallas Cowboys	12	5	0	.706	4–2	8–4	467	342	L1
^{(6)} New York Giants	9	7	1	.559	1–4–1	4–7–1	365	371	L1
Washington Commanders	8	8	1	.500	2–3–1	5–6–1	321	343	W1

==== Conference ====
NFC
#	Team	Division	W	L	T	PCT	DIV	CONF	SOS	SOV	STK
**Division leaders**
1	Philadelphia Eagles	East	14	3	0	.824	4–2	9–3	.474	.460	W1
2 (Note: San Francisco claimed the No. 2 seed over Minnesota based on conference record (10–2 vs. 8–4).)	San Francisco 49ers	West	13	4	0	.765	6–0	10–2	.417	.414	W10
3	Minnesota Vikings	North	13	4	0	.765	4–2	8–4	.474	.425	W1
4	Tampa Bay Buccaneers	South	8	9	0	.471	4–2	8–4	.503	.426	L1
**Wild cards**
5	Dallas Cowboys	East	12	5	0	.706	4–2	8–4	.507	.485	L1
6	New York Giants	East	9	7	1	.559	1–4–1	4–7–1	.526	.395	L1
7 (Note: Seattle finished ahead of Detroit based on head-to-head victory, claiming the 7th and final playoff spot.)	Seattle Seahawks	West	9	8	0	.529	4–2	6–6	.462	.382	W2
**Did not qualify for the postseason**
8	Detroit Lions	North	9	8	0	.529	5–1	7–5	.535	.451	W2
9	Washington Commanders	East	8	8	1	.500	2–3–1	5–6–1	.536	.449	W1
10	Green Bay Packers	North	8	9	0	.471	3–3	6–6	.524	.449	L1
11 (Note: Carolina finished ahead of New Orleans and Atlanta based on head-to-head record (3–1 vs. 2–2/1–3).)	Carolina Panthers	South	7	10	0	.412	4–2	6–6	.474	.437	W1
12 (Note: New Orleans finished ahead of Atlanta based on head-to-head sweep.)	New Orleans Saints	South	7	10	0	.412	2–4	5–7	.507	.462	L1
13	Atlanta Falcons	South	7	10	0	.412	2–4	6–6	.467	.429	W2
14	Los Angeles Rams	West	5	12	0	.294	1–5	3–9	.517	.341	L2
15	Arizona Cardinals	West	4	13	0	.235	1–5	3–9	.529	.368	L7
16	Chicago Bears	North	3	14	0	.176	0–6	1–11	.571	.480	L10
**Tiebreakers** (Note: When breaking ties for three or more teams under the NFL's rules, they are first broken within divisions, then comparing only the highest-ranked remaining team from each division.)

== Regular season statistical leaders ==
	Player(s)	Value	NFL Rank	NFC Rank
Passing yards	Daniel Jones	3,205 Yards	15th	7th
Passing touchdowns	Daniel Jones	15 TDs	T-21st	T-11th
Rushing yards	Saquon Barkley	1,312 Yards	4th	1st
Rushing touchdowns	Saquon Barkley	10 TDs	9th	5th
Receptions	Saquon Barkley & Richie James	57 Receptions	T-60th	T-28th
Receiving yards	Darius Slayton	724 Yards	47th	20th
Receiving touchdowns	Isaiah Hodgins & Richie James	4 TDs	T-46th	T-24th
Points	Graham Gano	119 Points	T-11th	6th
Kickoff Return Yards	Gary Brightwell	555 Yards	12th	7th
Punt return Yards	Richie James	174 Yards	20th	10th
Tackles	Julian Love	124 Tackles	T-24th	T-12th
Sacks	Dexter Lawrence	7.5 Sacks	T-39th	T-21st
Interceptions	Dane Belton & Julian Love	2 INTs	T-55th	T-28th

== Postseason ==
=== Schedule ===
Round	Date	Opponent (seed)	Result	Record	Venue	Recap
Wild Card	January 15	at Minnesota Vikings (3)	W 31–24	1–0	U.S. Bank Stadium	Recap
Divisional	January 21	at Philadelphia Eagles (1)	L 7–38	1–1	Lincoln Financial Field	Recap

=== Game summaries ===
==== NFC Wild Card Playoffs: at (3) Minnesota Vikings ====
NFC Wild Card Playoffs: (6) New York Giants at (3) Minnesota Vikings – Game summary

Quarter	1	2	3	4	Total
Giants	14	3	7	7	31
Vikings	7	7	7	3	24

at U.S. Bank Stadium, Minneapolis, Minnesota

- Date: January 15, 2023
- Game time: 4:30 p.m. EST/3:30 p.m. CST
- Game weather: None (indoor stadium)
- Game attendance: 66,721
- Referee: Adrian Hill
- TV announcers (Fox): Kevin Burkhardt, Greg Olsen, Erin Andrews, and Tom Rinaldi
- Recap, Game Book

Game information

First quarter

- MIN – Kirk Cousins 1-yard run (Greg Joseph kick), 8:23. Vikings 7–0. Drive: 12 plays, 75 yards, 6:37.
- NYG – Saquon Barkley 28-yard run (Graham Gano kick), 5:11. Tied 7–7. Drive: 5 plays, 75 yards, 3:12.
- NYG – Isaiah Hodgins 14-yard pass from Daniel Jones (Graham Gano kick), 1:03. Giants 14–7. Drive: 4 plays, 81 yards, 2:03.

Second quarter

- NYG – Graham Gano 25-yard field goal, 3:25. Giants 17–7. Drive: 20 plays, 85 yards, 10:52.
- MIN – K. J. Osborn 9-yard pass from Kirk Cousins (Greg Joseph kick), 0:45. Giants 17–14. Drive: 8 plays, 75 yards, 2:40.

Third quarter

- NYG – Daniel Bellinger 9-yard pass from Daniel Jones (Graham Gano kick), 11:37. Giants 24–14. Drive: 6 plays, 75 yards, 3:23.
- MIN – Irv Smith Jr. 3-yard pass from Kirk Cousins (Greg Joseph kick), 7:46. Giants 24–21. Drive: 8 plays, 75 yards, 3:51.

Fourth quarter

- MIN – Greg Joseph 38-yard field goal, 12:34. Tied 24–24. Drive: 12 plays, 56 yards, 6:38.
- NYG – Saquon Barkley 2-yard run (Graham Gano kick), 7:47. Giants 31–24. Drive: 12 plays, 75 yards, 4:47.

Top passers

- NYG – Daniel Jones – 24/35, 301 yards, 2 TD
- MIN – Kirk Cousins – 31/39, 273 yards, 2 TD

Top rushers

- NYG – Daniel Jones – 17 rushes, 78 yards
- MIN – Dalvin Cook – 15 rushes, 60 yards

Top receivers

- NYG – Isaiah Hodgins – 8 receptions, 105 yards, TD
- MIN – T. J. Hockenson – 10 receptions, 129 yards

In the Giants' first playoff game since 2016, Daniel Jones threw for over 300 yards and two touchdowns, along Saquon Barkley rushing for two touchdowns in their first playoff win since Super Bowl XLVI back in 2011.

==== NFC Divisional Playoffs: at (1) Philadelphia Eagles ====
NFC Divisional Playoffs: (6) New York Giants at (1) Philadelphia Eagles – Game summary

Quarter	1	2	3	4	Total
Giants	0	0	7	0	7
Eagles	14	14	0	10	38

at Lincoln Financial Field, Philadelphia, Pennsylvania

- Date: January 21, 2023
- Game time: 8:15 p.m. EST
- Game weather: Cloudy, 38 °F (3 °C)
- Game attendance: 69,879
- Referee: Clete Blakeman
- TV announcers (Fox): Joe Davis, Daryl Johnston, Pam Oliver, and Kristina Pink
- Recap, Game Book

Game information

First quarter

- PHI – Dallas Goedert 16-yard pass from Jalen Hurts (Jake Elliott kick), 10:06. Eagles 7–0. Drive: 8 plays, 75 yards, 4:54.
- PHI – DeVonta Smith 9-yard pass from Jalen Hurts (Jake Elliott kick), 1:21. Eagles 14–0. Drive: 8 plays, 52 yards, 4:18.

Second quarter

- PHI – Boston Scott 3-yard rush (Jake Elliott kick), 7:29. Eagles 21–0. Drive: 9 plays, 63 yards, 4:52.
- PHI – Jalen Hurts 4-yard rush (Jake Elliott kick), 0:43. Eagles 28–0. Drive: 14 plays, 72 yards, 5:04.

Third quarter

- NYG – Matt Breida 8-yard rush (Graham Gano kick), 6:15. Eagles 28–7. Drive: 10 plays, 88 yards, 6:01.

Fourth quarter

- PHI – Jake Elliott 30-yard field goal, 5:16. Eagles 31–7. Drive: 15 plays, 70 yards, 7:56.
- PHI – Kenneth Gainwell 35-yard rush (Jake Elliott kick), 1:51. Eagles 38–7. Drive: 3 plays, 36 yards, 1:00.

Top passers

- NYG – Daniel Jones – 15/27, 135 yards, INT
- PHI – Jalen Hurts – 16/24, 154 yards, 2 TD

Top rushers

- NYG – Saquon Barkley – 9 rushes, 61 yards
- PHI – Kenneth Gainwell – 12 rushes, 112 yards, TD

Top receivers

- NYG – Richie James – 7 receptions, 51 yards
- PHI – DeVonta Smith – 6 receptions, 61 yards, 1 TD

With the loss, the Eagles ended the Giants season. As of 2026, this remains the Giants last appearance in a playoff game.

== Awards and honors ==
Recipient	Award(s)
Saquon Barkley	Week 1; NFC Offensive Player of the Week
Graham Gano	Week 2; NFC Special Teams Player of the Week
Daniel Jones	Week 7; NFC Offensive Player of the Week
Kayvon Thibodeaux	Week 15; NFC Defensive Player of the Week
