= Dane Belton =

American football player (born 2000)

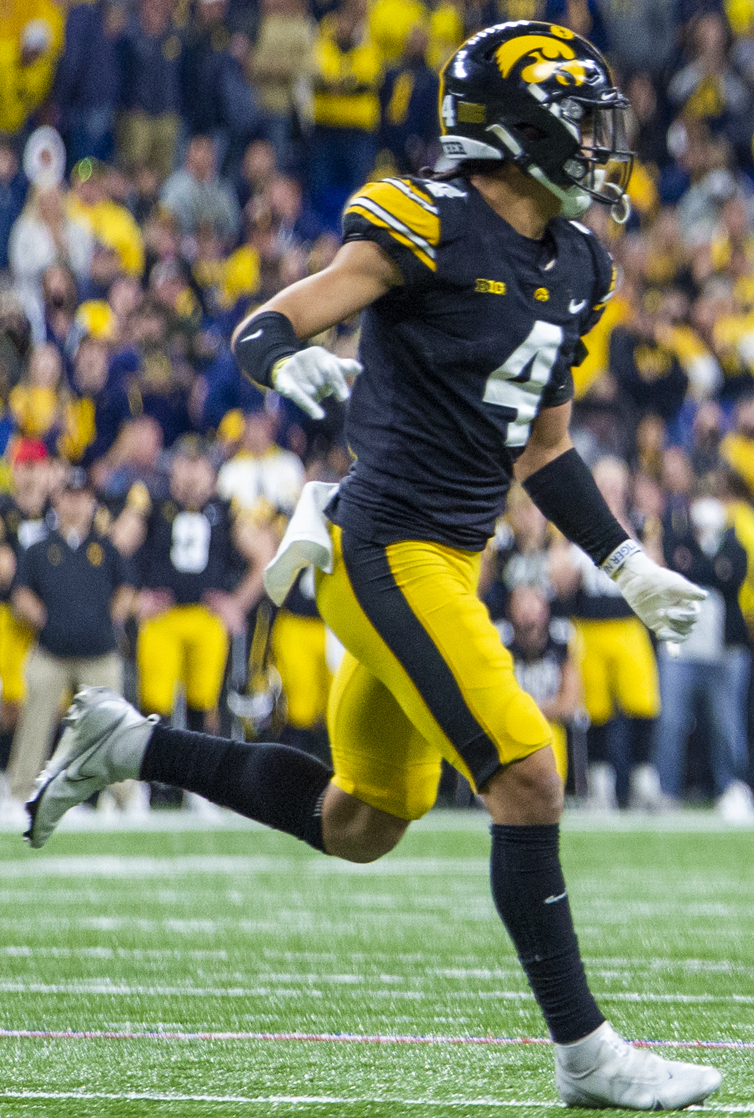
- Belton in the 2021 Big Ten Football Championship Game

No. 6 – New York Jets
- Position: Safety
- Roster status: Active

Personal information
- Born: December 7, 2000 (age 25); Tampa, Florida, U.S.
- Listed height: 6 ft 1 in (1.85 m)
- Listed weight: 205 lb (93 kg)

Career information
- High school: Jesuit (Tampa)
- College: Iowa (2019–2021)
- NFL draft: 2022: 4th round, 114th overall pick

Career history
- New York Giants (2022–2025); New York Jets (2026–present)

Awards and highlights
- First-team All-Big Ten (2021)

Career NFL statistics as of Week 9, 2026
- Total tackles: 316
- Sacks: 5.0
- Pass deflections: 20
- Interceptions: 6
- Forced fumbles: 4
- Fumble recoveries: 4
- Stats at Pro Football Reference

Dane Jacob Belton (born December 7, 2000) is an American professional football safety for the New York Jets of the National Football League (NFL). He played college football for the Iowa Hawkeyes.

== Early life ==
Belton grew up in Tampa, Florida and attended Jesuit High School. Belton was rated a three-star recruit and committed to play college football at Iowa from over 25 scholarship offers.

== College career ==
Dane Belton played collegiately at the University of Iowa. Belton played in eight games with four starts during his freshman season. As a sophomore, he had 33 tackles with 1.5 tackles for loss, one sack, five passes broken up, and one forced fumble. Belton was named first-team All-Big Ten Conference as a junior after recording 46 tackles with three tackles for loss and breaking up seven passes with five interceptions. After the end of the season, he declared that he would be entering the 2022 NFL draft.

== Professional career ==
Pre-draft measurables
Height	Weight	Arm length	Hand span	Wingspan	40-yard dash	10-yard split	20-yard split	20-yard shuttle	Three-cone drill	Vertical jump	Broad jump	Bench press
6 ft 0 5/8 in (1.84 m)	205 lb (93 kg)	31 in (0.79 m)	9 1/8 in (0.23 m)	6 ft 3 5/8 in (1.92 m)	4.43 s	1.51 s	2.52 s	4.06 s	6.74 s	36.5 in (0.93 m)	10 ft 3 in (3.12 m)	18 reps
All values from NFL Combine/Pro Day

=== New York Giants ===
The New York Giants selected Belton in the fourth round (114th overall) of the 2022 NFL draft. He was the 11th safety drafted. On August 1, 2022, Belton broke his collarbone during training camp. In Week 10 against the Houston Texans, Belton recorded his first career interception on quarterback Davis Mills in the 24–16 win.

In a Week 17 matchup against the Los Angeles Rams in 2023, Belton recorded two interceptions and two passes defended against quarterback Matthew Stafford. He also recorded a fumble recovery. In a Week 18 matchup against the Philadelphia Eagles, Belton sacked quarterback Jalen Hurts in the 27–10 win.

=== New York Jets ===
On March 12, 2026, Belton signed a one-year, $4 million contract with the New York Jets.

== NFL career statistics ==
Legend
**Bold**	Career high

=== Regular season ===
Year	Team	Games		Tackles					Interceptions						Fumbles				
Year	Team	GP	GS	Cmb	Solo	Ast	Sck	TFL	Int	Yds	Avg	Lng	TD	PD	FF	Fum	FR	Yds	TD
2022	NYG	15	5	31	24	7	0.0	1	**2**	0	0.0	0	0	3	0	0	**2**	**3**	0
2023	NYG	17	2	33	22	11	1.0	**3**	**2**	**22**	**11.0**	**20**	0	2	0	0	1	2	0
2024	NYG	17	6	56	28	28	1.0	1	1	0	0.0	0	0	**6**	1	0	1	0	0
2025	NYG	17	9	**120**	**60**	**60**	**2.0**	**3**	1	8	8.0	8	0	5	**3**	0	0	0	0
Career		66	22	240	134	106	4.0	8	6	30	5.0	20	0	16	4	0	4	5	0

=== Postseason ===
Year	Team	Games		Tackles					Interceptions						Fumbles				
Year	Team	GP	GS	Cmb	Solo	Ast	Sck	TFL	Int	Yds	Avg	Lng	TD	PD	FF	Fum	FR	Yds	TD
2022	NYG	2	0	2	2	0	0.0	0	0	0	0.0	0	0	0	0	0	0	0	0
Career		2	0	2	2	0	0.0	0	0	0	0.0	0	0	0	0	0	0	0	0
