= Tony Sparano Jr. =

American football coach (born 1986)

Indianapolis Colts
- Title: Offensive line coach

Personal information
- Born: October 22, 1986 (age 40); Boston, Massachusetts, U.S.
- Listed height: 5 ft 11 in (1.80 m)
- Listed weight: 245 lb (111 kg)

Career information
- Position: Defensive end
- College: Albany

Career history
- Hartford Colonials (2010) Assistant defensive line coach; Miami Dolphins (2011) Offensive quality control coach; New York Jets (2012) Seasonal Intern; New York Jets (2013) Offensive Intern; New York Jets (2014) Offensive assistant; Buffalo Bills (2015–2016) Tight ends coach; Jacksonville Jaguars (2017–2020) Assistant offensive line coach; Carolina Panthers (2021) Assistant offensive line coach; New York Giants (2022) Assistant offensive line coach; Indianapolis Colts (2023–present) Offensive line coach

Anthony Michael Sparano Jr. (born October 22, 1986) is an American football coach who is the offensive line coach for the Indianapolis Colts of the National Football League (NFL). He has previously served as the assistant DL coach of the Hartford Colonials, the quality control and offense coach for the Miami Dolphins, an offensive assistant for the New York Jets, and an assistant offensive line coach for the Carolina Panthers. He most recently had been the assistant offensive line coach of the New York Giants.

== College ==
Sparano attended the University of Albany, playing defensive end. He made 24 career appearances, earning three varsity letters en route to being named to the "2008 ESPN The Magazine All-District 1 Academic Team".

== Coaching career ==
=== Hartford Colonials ===
Sparano started out his coaching career in 2010 with the Hartford Colonials of the United Football League (UFL). They hired him as a defensive line assistant based on his experience as a defensive player for the University of Albany for three years and his background with his father Tony Sparano being the assistant coach for the Browns.

=== Miami Dolphins ===
After coaching a year there Sparano then moved to coach the Miami Dolphins as a quality control coach, where he was working under his father.

=== New York Jets ===
After his father was fired from the Dolphins, both Sparano men started coaching with the New York Jets in 2012. Tony started out coaching with the Jets as a seasonal intern and then an offensive intern. After his father was fired from the Jets as the assistant head coach, head coach Rex Ryan decided that he wanted to keep Tony and give him a promotion. Sparano accepted the promotion to offensive assistant and was said to be an asset to the team by doing "the job of a ton of guys" (Ryan).

=== Buffalo Bills ===
Sparano was with the Jets for three years and after Ryan was fired, he followed him when he became the new head coach for the Buffalo Bills. Sparano spent the 2015 and 2016 seasons with the Bills as the team's tight ends coach, with one of his charges, Charles Clay recording a team-high 57 receptions for 552 yards during the second of those years.

Sparano was replaced by Rob Boras as the Buffalo Bills tight ends' coach under Sean McDermott's new coaching staff on January 17, 2017.

=== Jacksonville Jaguars ===
Sparano was not unemployed long. Two days later, on January 19, 2017, Sparano was hired by the Jacksonville Jaguars as an assistant offensive line coach. He would remain with the club for four seasons, helping lead the team in its run to the 2017 AFC Championship Game. During that season, the Jaguar offensive line allowed a total of just 24 sacks in 16 regular season games, tied for third fewest in the league.

=== Carolina Panthers ===
On January 19, 2021, Sparano was named as assistant offensive line coach of the Carolina Panthers. He would remain with the team only one year.

=== New York Giants ===
On February 10, 2022, the New York Giants hired Sparano as an assistant offensive line coach.

During his season with the Giants, the team finished with a 9–7–1 record, making the playoffs and winning their wildcard weekend match up on the road against the Minnesota Vikings before ultimately falling to the arch-rival Philadelphia Eagles in the divisional round.

=== Indianapolis Colts ===
On February 27, 2023, the Indianapolis Colts hired Sparano as the offensive line coach. Sparano is credited for helping to repair the offensive line that faltered during the anemic 12-loss 2022 Colts season, which was marked by a frantic mid-season change of head coaches. During 2023, two Colts linemen — center Ryan Kelly and left guard Quenton Nelson — returned to Pro Bowl form, earning their fourth and sixth selections to that post-season all-star team.

During his first two years with the team, the Colts ranked in the top 10 in rushing in the NFL, with running back Jonathan Taylor finishing fourth in the league with 1,431 yards gained in 2024.

== Personal life ==
Sparano was born in Boston, Massachusetts, the son of former NFL head coach Tony Sparano. He and his wife have four children.
