= Darnay Holmes =

American football player (born 1998)

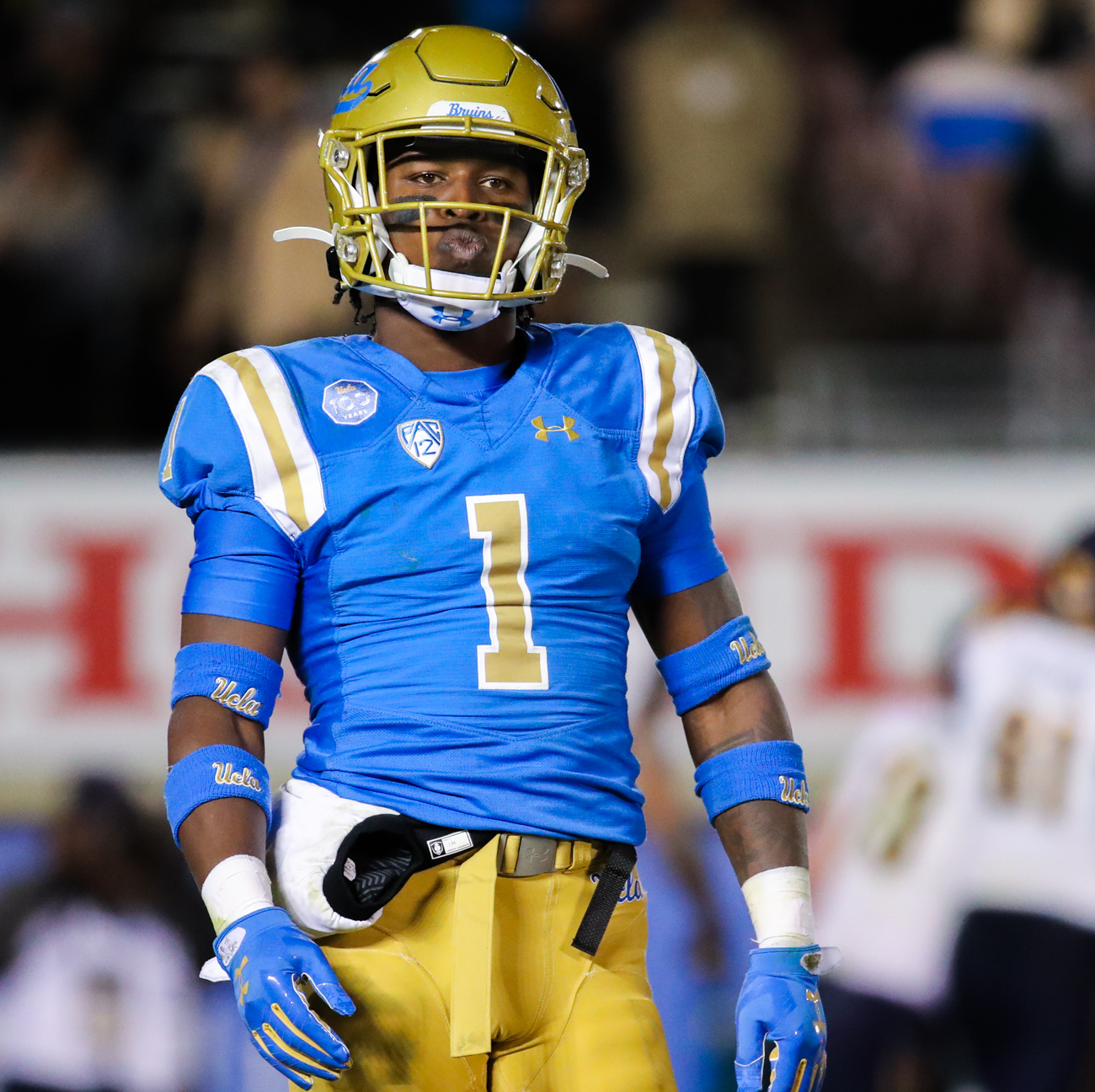
- Holmes with the UCLA Bruins in 2019

No. 30 – Atlanta Falcons
- Position: Cornerback
- Roster status: Practice squad

Personal information
- Born: June 23, 1998 (age 28); Pasadena, California, U.S.
- Listed height: 5 ft 10 in (1.78 m)
- Listed weight: 198 lb (90 kg)

Career information
- High school: Calabasas (Calabasas, California)
- College: UCLA (2017–2019)
- NFL draft: 2020: 4th round, 110th overall pick

Career history
- New York Giants (2020–2023); Las Vegas Raiders (2024–2025); Atlanta Falcons (2026–present)*
- * Offseason or practice squad member only

Career NFL statistics as of 2025
- Total tackles: 164
- Sacks: 1.5
- Forced fumbles: 2
- Fumble recoveries: 1
- Pass deflections: 21
- Interceptions: 4
- Stats at Pro Football Reference

Darnay Darius Robert Holmes (born June 23, 1998) is an American professional football cornerback for the Atlanta Falcons of the National Football League (NFL). He played college football for the UCLA Bruins. His father, Darick Holmes, played in the NFL from 1995 to 1999.

== Early life ==
Holmes attended Calabasas High School in Calabasas, California. He led the Coyotes to their first California Interscholastic Federation (CIF) title after scoring five touchdowns on offense, defense and special teams in a 42–3 win over Palos Verdes. Holmes played in the 2017 U.S. Army All-American Bowl. A five-star recruit, he committed to the University of California, Los Angeles (UCLA) to play college football.

== College career ==
After an early enrollment to participate in the spring game, Holmes played for the Bruins from 2017 to 2019. He became a starter his freshman year and started 33 of the 35 games he played in. After the 2019 season, he entered the 2020 NFL draft. He finished his career with 120 tackles, eight interceptions, and two touchdowns.

== Professional career ==
Pre-draft measurables
| Height | Weight | Arm length | Hand span | Wingspan | 40-yard dash | 10-yard split | 20-yard split | Bench press |
|---|---|---|---|---|---|---|---|---|
| 5 ft 9 3/4 in (1.77 m) | 195 lb (88 kg) | 29 1/2 in (0.75 m) | 9 1/4 in (0.23 m) | 5 ft 9 3/4 in (1.77 m) | 4.48 s | 1.53 s | 2.67 s | 12 reps |
All values from NFL Combine

=== New York Giants ===
Holmes was selected by the New York Giants with the 110th pick in the fourth round of the 2020 NFL draft. In Week 13 against the Seattle Seahawks, Holmes recorded his first career interception off a pass thrown by Russell Wilson during the 17–12 win.

On November 30, 2021, Holmes was placed on the injured reserve list after suffering a rib injury after intercepting Philadelphia Eagles quarterback Jalen Hurts.

Holmes re-signed with the Giants on March 20, 2024. On August 27, Holmes was released by New York.

=== Las Vegas Raiders ===
On August 28, 2024, Holmes signed with the Las Vegas Raiders. He played in 16 games for Las Vegas (including one start), recording 30 tackles, one sack, and three passes defensed.

On March 18, 2025, Holmes was re-signed by the Raiders.

=== Atlanta Falcons ===
On April 1, 2026, the Atlanta Falcons signed Holmes to a one-year contract. On August 30, Holmes was released by Atlanta as a part of final roster cuts; he was re-signed to the team's practice squad the next day.

== NFL career statistics ==
Legend
| **Bold** | Career high |

=== Regular season ===
| Year | Team | Games | | Tackles | | | | | Interceptions | | | | | | Fumbles | | | | | Punt returns | | | | | Kick returns | | | | |
| Year | Team | GP | GS | Cmb | Solo | Ast | Sck | TFL | Int | Yds | Avg | Lng | TD | PD | FF | Fum | FR | Yds | TD | Ret | Yds | Avg | Lng | TD | Ret | Yds | Avg | Lng | TD |
|---|---|---|---|---|---|---|---|---|---|---|---|---|---|---|---|---|---|---|---|---|---|---|---|---|---|---|---|---|---|
| 2020 | NYG | 12 | **5** | 30 | 23 | 7 | 0.5 | 0 | 1 | 0 | 0.0 | 0 | 0 | 5 | 0 | 0 | **1** | 0 | 0 | 0 | 0 | 0.0 | 0 | 0 | 0 | 0 | 0.0 | 0 | 0 |
| 2021 | NYG | 11 | 4 | 29 | 21 | 8 | 0.0 | 0 | 1 | **15** | **15.0** | **15** | 0 | 2 | 0 | 0 | 0 | **22** | 0 | 0 | 0 | 0.0 | 0 | 0 | **5** | **97** | **19.4** | **23** | 0 |
| 2022 | NYG | 15 | 2 | **38** | **28** | 10 | 0.0 | **2** | 0 | 0 | 0.0 | 0 | 0 | **8** | **1** | 0 | 0 | 0 | 0 | **1** | 0 | 0.0 | 0 | 0 | 0 | 0 | 0.0 | 0 | 0 |
| 2023 | NYG | **16** | 0 | 18 | 17 | 1 | 0.0 | 1 | **2** | 13 | 6.5 | 11 | 0 | 3 | **1** | 0 | 0 | 0 | 0 | 0 | 0 | 0.0 | 0 | 0 | 0 | 0 | 0.0 | 0 | 0 |
| 2024 | LV | **16** | 1 | 30 | 14 | **16** | **1.0** | **2** | 0 | 0 | 0.0 | 0 | 0 | 3 | 0 | 0 | 0 | 0 | 0 | 0 | 0 | 0.0 | 0 | 0 | 0 | 0 | 0.0 | 0 | 0 |
| 2025 | LV | 13 | 0 | 19 | 13 | 6 | 0.0 | 0 | 0 | 0 | 0.0 | 0 | 0 | 0 | 0 | 0 | 0 | 0 | 0 | 0 | 0 | 0.0 | 0 | 0 | 0 | 0 | 0.0 | 0 | 0 |
| Career | | 83 | 12 | 164 | 116 | 48 | 1.5 | 5 | 4 | 28 | 7.0 | 15 | 0 | 21 | 2 | 0 | 1 | 22 | 0 | 1 | 0 | 0.0 | 0 | 0 | 5 | 97 | 19.4 | 23 | 0 |

=== Postseason ===
| Year | Team | Games | | Tackles | | | | | Interceptions | | | | | | Fumbles | | | | |
| Year | Team | GP | GS | Cmb | Solo | Ast | Sck | TFL | Int | Yds | Avg | Lng | TD | PD | FF | Fum | FR | Yds | TD |
|---|---|---|---|---|---|---|---|---|---|---|---|---|---|---|---|---|---|---|---|
| 2022 | NYG | 2 | 2 | 7 | 4 | 3 | 0.0 | 2 | 0 | 0 | 0.0 | 0 | 0 | 0 | 0 | 0 | 0 | 0 | 0 |
| Career | | 2 | 2 | 7 | 4 | 3 | 0.0 | 2 | 0 | 0 | 0.0 | 0 | 0 | 0 | 0 | 0 | 0 | 0 | 0 |
