= Tomon Fox =

American football player (born 1998)

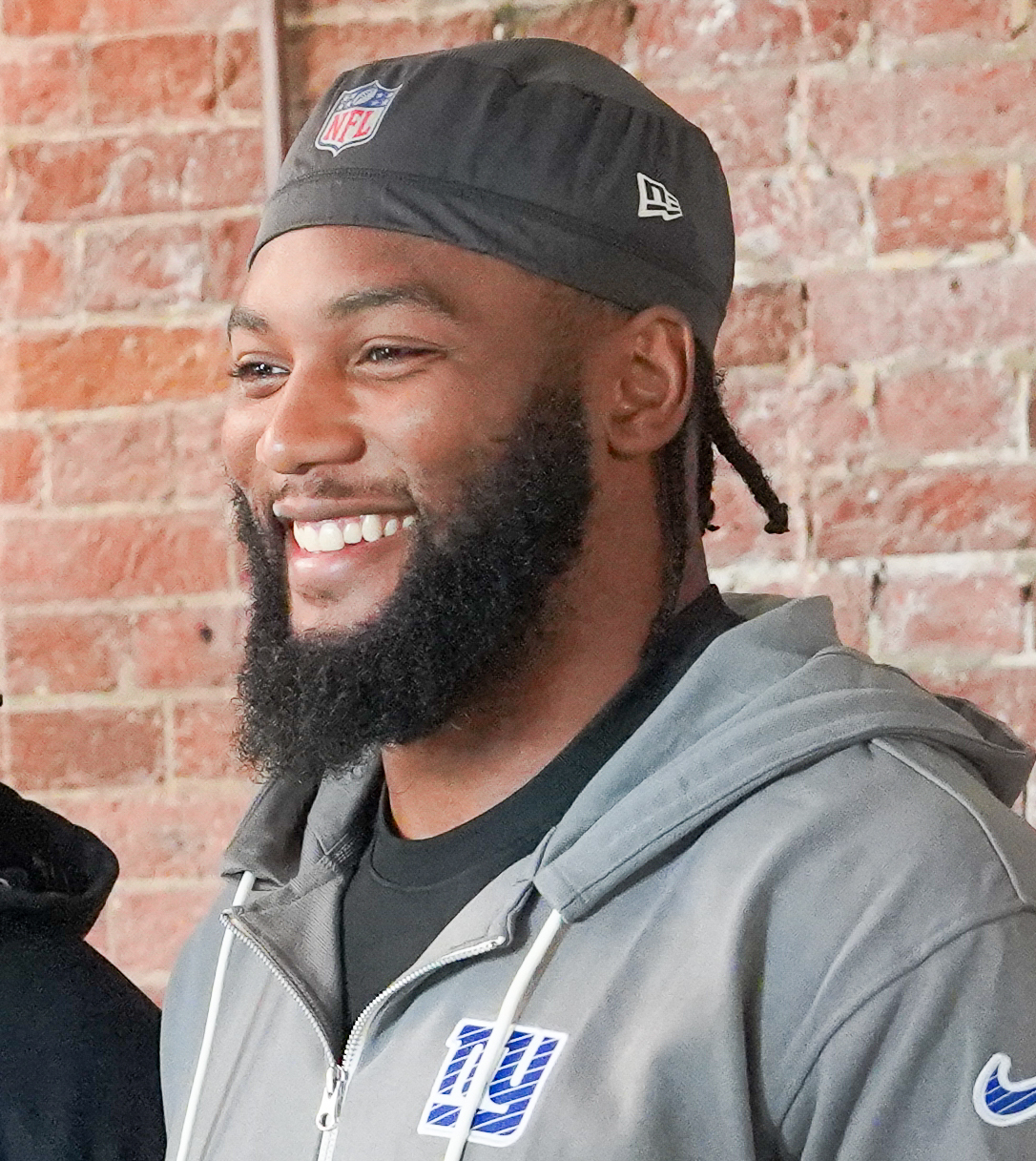
- Fox in 2024

Profile
- Position: Outside linebacker

Personal information
- Born: March 16, 1998 (age 28); Suwanee, Georgia, U.S.
- Listed height: 6 ft 2 in (1.88 m)
- Listed weight: 245 lb (111 kg)

Career information
- High school: Collins Hill (Suwanee)
- College: North Carolina (2016–2021)
- NFL draft: 2022: undrafted

Career history
- New York Giants (2022–2025); Los Angeles Rams (2026)*
- * Offseason or practice squad member only

Awards and highlights
- Third-team All-ACC (2021)

Career NFL statistics as of 2025
- Total tackles: 45
- Sacks: 2
- Stats at Pro Football Reference

Tomon Fox (born March 16, 1998) is an American professional football outside linebacker. He played college football for the North Carolina Tar Heels and signed with the New York Giants as an undrafted free agent in 2022.

== College career ==
Fox played at the University of North Carolina from 2016 to 2021. During his collegiate career there he made 47 starts and had 29.5 sacks. His sack total puts him third on the all-time list at UNC ahead of previous alumnus Lawrence Taylor who also preceded him in playing for the Giants.

== Professional career ==
Pre-draft measurables
| Height | Weight | Arm length | Hand span | Wingspan | Bench press |
|---|---|---|---|---|---|
| 6 ft 2 3/8 in (1.89 m) | 253 lb (115 kg) | 33 1/8 in (0.84 m) | 9 5/8 in (0.24 m) | 6 ft 8 3/4 in (2.05 m) | 24 reps |
All values from Pro Day

=== New York Giants ===
Fox signed with the New York Giants as an undrafted free agent in 2022. He was the only undrafted free agent to make the roster at the end of the 2022 pre-season and to make the team's initial 2022 regular season roster. In Week 1 game against the Tennessee Titans Fox got his first career sack on Ryan Tannehill.

On August 29, 2023, Fox was waived by the Giants and re-signed to the practice squad. He signed a reserve/future contract with New York on January 10, 2024.

Fox was waived by the Giants on August 27, 2024, and re-signed to the practice squad. He was promoted to the active roster on November 2.

On August 26, 2025, Fox was waived by the Giants as part of final roster cuts and re-signed to the practice squad the next day. He was promoted to the active roster on September 27 and waived two days later. On October 1, Fox was re-signed to the practice squad. On November 8, Fox was signed to the active roster. He was waived again on November 17 and re-signed to the practice squad two days later. He was promoted back to the active roster on December 1, but waived the next day. On December 4, Fox was re-signed to the practice squad. He was again promoted to the active roster on December 13.

=== Los Angeles Rams ===
On June 9, 2026, Fox signed with the Los Angeles Rams. He was released by the Rams on August 29.
