= Daniel Bellinger =

American football player (born 2000)

No. 82 – Tennessee Titans
- Position: Tight end
- Roster status: Active

Personal information
- Born: September 22, 2000 (age 26); Las Vegas, Nevada, U.S.
- Listed height: 6 ft 6 in (1.98 m)
- Listed weight: 255 lb (116 kg)

Career information
- High school: Palo Verde (Las Vegas)
- College: San Diego State (2018–2021)
- NFL draft: 2022: 4th round, 112th overall pick

Career history
- New York Giants (2022–2025); Tennessee Titans (2026–present)

Career NFL statistics as of Week 10, 2026
- Receptions: 99
- Receiving yards: 1,010
- Receiving touchdowns: 5
- Rushing yards: 2
- Rushing touchdowns: 1
- Stats at Pro Football Reference

Daniel George Bellinger (born September 22, 2000) is an American professional football tight end for the Tennessee Titans of the National Football League (NFL). He played college football for the San Diego State Aztecs.

== Early life ==
Bellinger grew up in Las Vegas, Nevada, and attended Palo Verde High School. In his senior season, Bellinger was named All-Sunset 4A Region at tight end after catching 21 passes for 371 yards and three touchdowns and first-team All-State at linebacker

== College career ==
Bellinger played 59 offensive snaps and caught one pass for ten yards as a true freshman at San Diego State University. As a sophomore, he had 15 receptions for 201 yards and three touchdowns. Bellinger caught 21 passes for 203 yards as a junior. As a senior, he caught 31 passes for 357 yards and two touchdowns. At the end of the season, Bellinger received an invitation to play in the Senior Bowl.

== Professional career ==
Pre-draft measurables
Height	Weight	Arm length	Hand span	Wingspan	40-yard dash	10-yard split	20-yard split	20-yard shuttle	Three-cone drill	Vertical jump	Broad jump	Bench press
6 ft 4 7/8 in (1.95 m)	253 lb (115 kg)	32 1/2 in (0.83 m)	10 1/8 in (0.26 m)	6 ft 4 5/8 in (1.95 m)	4.63 s	1.62 s	2.66 s	4.44 s	7.03 s	35.0 in (0.89 m)	10 ft 5 in (3.18 m)	22 reps
All values from NFL Combine/Pro Day

=== New York Giants ===
Bellinger was selected by the New York Giants in the fourth round (112th overall) of the 2022 NFL draft. On July 21, 2022, he was placed on the physically unable to perform (PUP) list with a quad injury. On July 27, Bellinger was activated from the PUP list. Daniel had his first career reception against the Carolina Panthers on September 18, which resulted in a game-tying touchdown. In Week 7 against the Jacksonville Jaguars, Bellinger got his eye poked by Devin Lloyd. The injury required surgery to repair his septum, as well as to repair fractures on the lower part of his left eye socket. He appeared in 12 games, of which he started 11. Bellinger finished his rookie season with 30 receptions for 268 yards and two receiving touchdowns, to go along with a rushing touchdown.

In the Wild Card Round of the 2022-23 playoffs, Bellinger recorded a receiving touchdown in the Giants' 31–24 victory over the Minnesota Vikings.

In the 2023 season, Bellinger had 25 receptions for 255 yards in 17 games and 13 starts.

On October 19, 2025, in a 33-32 loss to the Denver Broncos, Bellinger had three catches for a career-high 88 yards, including a career-long 44 yard touchdown reception.

=== Tennessee Titans ===
On March 12, 2026, Bellinger signed a three-year, $24 million contract with the Tennessee Titans.

== NFL career statistics ==
Legend
**Bold**	Career high

=== Regular season ===
Year	Team	Games		Receiving					Rushing					Fumbles	
Year	Team	GP	GS	Rec	Yds	Avg	Lng	TD	Att	Yds	Avg	Lng	TD	Fum	Lost
2022	NYG	12	11	**30**	268	8.9	24	**2**	**1**	**2**	**2.0**	**2**	**1**	**1**	**1**
2023	NYG	**17**	**13**	25	255	10.2	26	0	0	0	0.0	0	0	0	0
2024	NYG	**17**	8	14	125	8.9	17	0	0	0	0.0	0	0	0	0
2025	NYG	16	10	19	**286**	15.1	**44**	**2**	0	0	0.0	0	0	0	0
2026	TEN	9	6	11	76	6.9	17	1	0	0	0.0	0	0	0	0
Career		71	48	98	1,010	10.2	44	5	1	2	2.0	2	1	1	1

=== Postseason ===
Year	Team	Games		Receiving					Fumbles	
Year	Team	GP	GS	Rec	Yds	Avg	Lng	TD	Fum	Lost
2022	NYG	2	2	3	21	7.0	9	1	0	0
Career		2	2	3	21	7.0	9	1	0	0
