= Chris Myarick =

American football player (born 1995)

Profile
- Positions: Tight end, fullback

Personal information
- Born: October 6, 1995 (age 31); Elkins Park, Pennsylvania, U.S.
- Listed height: 6 ft 5 in (1.96 m)
- Listed weight: 261 lb (118 kg)

Career information
- High school: Cheltenham (Cheltenham, Pennsylvania)
- College: Temple (2014–2018)
- NFL draft: 2019: undrafted

Career history
- Miami Dolphins (2019–2020); New York Giants (2021); Cincinnati Bengals (2021)*; New York Giants (2022–2023); Jacksonville Jaguars (2024)*; Houston Texans (2024)*; Miami Dolphins (2025)*; Las Vegas Raiders (2026)*
- * Offseason or practice squad member only

Career NFL statistics
- Receptions: 10
- Receiving yards: 82
- Receiving touchdowns: 2
- Stats at Pro Football Reference

Christopher George Myarick (born October 6, 1995) is an American professional football tight end and fullback. He played college football at Temple.

== Professional career ==
Pre-draft measurables
Height	Weight	Arm length	Hand span	Wingspan	40-yard dash	10-yard split	20-yard split	20-yard shuttle	Three-cone drill	Vertical jump	Broad jump	Bench press
6 ft 4 1/4 in (1.94 m)	251 lb (114 kg)	33 3/8 in (0.85 m)	9 1/4 in (0.23 m)	6 ft 7 5/8 in (2.02 m)	4.85 s	1.71 s	2.79 s	4.43 s	7.20 s	32.5 in (0.83 m)	9 ft 8 in (2.95 m)	23 reps
All values from Pro Day

=== Miami Dolphins ===
Myarick was signed by the Miami Dolphins as an undrafted free agent on May 9, 2019. He was waived during final roster cuts on September 1, but was signed to the team's practice squad two days later, where he spent the rest of the season. Myarick signed a reserve/futures contract with the Dolphins following the regular season on December 31.

On September 5, 2020, Myarick was waived during final roster cuts, and re-signed to the practice squad two days later. He was elevated to the active roster on November 13, November 21, December 12, and December 19 for the team's Weeks 10, 11, 14, and 15 games against the Los Angeles Chargers, Denver Broncos, Kansas City Chiefs, and New England Patriots, reverting back to the practice squad after each game.

Myarick signed a reserve/future contract with the Dolphins on January 5, 2021. On August 31, Myarick was waived by the Dolphins.

=== New York Giants ===
On September 2, 2021, Myarick was signed to the New York Giants' practice squad. On November 22, Myarick was elevated from the practice squad for the game against the Tampa Bay Buccaneers. In that game, Myarick was targeted with a pass for the first time in his NFL career, but the throw was intercepted by Tampa Bay defender Steve McLendon. On November 24, Myarick was signed to the active roster. In a Week 12 game against the Philadelphia Eagles, Myarick made his first career reception on a one-yard touchdown pass from quarterback Daniel Jones. He later caught another pass for his second career catch, and finished the game with 11 receiving yards. Myarick received the highest grade from Pro Football Focus for the game of any Giants offensive player, and each of his catches was an important play in the Giants' 13–7 victory over Myarick's hometown team. On January 4, 2022, Myarick was waived.

=== Cincinnati Bengals ===
On January 6, 2022, Myarick was signed to the Cincinnati Bengals' practice squad. He remained in that role through Super Bowl LVI.

=== New York Giants (second stint) ===
The New York Giants signed Myarick to a reserve/futures contract on February 22, 2022. In their season opener against the Tennessee Titans, he caught a late touchdown pass which, after a successful two-point conversion, gave the Giants a 21–20 lead that they would not relinquish. He was waived on December 28, re-signed to the practice squad two days later, and elevated to the active roster in advance of the Giants' next game. He signed a reserve/future contract on January 23, 2023. He was placed on injured reserve on August 29. Myarick was waived on November 13.

=== Jacksonville Jaguars ===
On August 3, 2024, Myarick signed with the Jacksonville Jaguars. He was released on August 25.

=== Houston Texans ===
On September 6, 2024, Myarick was signed to the Houston Texans' practice squad. He was released on October 14.

=== Miami Dolphins (second stint) ===
On August 4, 2025, Myarick signed with the Dolphins after Jalin Conyers was placed on injured reserve. He was released on August 26 as part of final roster cuts. On October 22, Myarick was re-signed to the practice squad after Darren Waller was placed on injured reserve.

=== Las Vegas Raiders ===
On August 5, 2026, Myarick signed with the Las Vegas Raiders. Myarick was released by Las Vegas as a part of final roster cuts on August 30; he was re-signed to the team's practice squad the following day. He was released on October 19.
