= Zyon Gilbert =

American football player (born 1999)

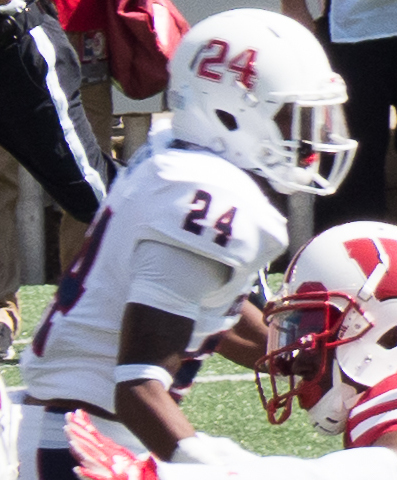
- Gilbert with Florida Atlantic in 2017

Profile
- Position: Cornerback

Personal information
- Born: February 4, 1999 (age 27); Montgomery, Alabama, U.S.
- Listed height: 6 ft 0 in (1.83 m)
- Listed weight: 193 lb (88 kg)

Career information
- High school: Jefferson Davis (AL)
- College: Florida Atlantic (2017–2021)
- NFL draft: 2022: undrafted

Career history
- New York Giants (2022); Green Bay Packers (2023)*; Pittsburgh Steelers (2024)*; Hamilton Tiger-Cats (2026)*
- * Offseason or practice squad member only

Career NFL statistics
- Total tackles: 14
- Sacks: 1
- Stats at Pro Football Reference

Zyon Gilbert (born February 4, 1999) is an American professional football cornerback. He played college football for the Florida Atlantic Owls and was signed by the Giants as an undrafted free agent in 2022.

== Early life and education ==
Gilbert was born on February 4, 1999, in Montgomery, Alabama. He attended Jefferson Davis High School there and was a two-way player in football, earning twice all-state honors. He was named the school's best defensive back, best two-way player, and was given the "speed award" at a season-ending banquet. Gilbert was a three-star recruit and committed to Florida Atlantic.

Gilbert became the starter as a true freshman in 2017 and recorded 52 total tackles in 14 games. He remained a starter in 2018 and recorded 51 tackles in 12 matches. In 2019, Gilbert recorded 48 tackles, 10 passes defended, two interceptions and a forced fumble on his way to being named honorable mention all-conference.

As a senior in 2020, Gilbert tallied 46 tackles, one interception and six passes defended, being named honorable mention all-conference for the second consecutive season. After being given an extra year of eligibility due to the COVID-19 pandemic, he opted to return to the team in 2021 for a final season. That year, Gilbert appeared in 12 games and finished with 51 tackles, two interceptions and 12 passes defended, as well as a third honorable mention all-conference selection. He finished his time at Florida Atlantic as the school's all-time leader in games played with 57, and recorded 248 tackles, 31 passes defended and five interceptions.

== Professional career ==
Pre-draft measurables
Height	Weight	Arm length	Hand span	40-yard dash	10-yard split	20-yard split	20-yard shuttle	Three-cone drill	Vertical jump	Broad jump
6 ft 0 1/4 in (1.84 m)	193 lb (88 kg)	30 7/8 in (0.78 m)	8 7/8 in (0.23 m)	4.49 s	1.54 s	2.55 s	4.29 s	7.34 s	40.0 in (1.02 m)	11 ft 6 in (3.51 m)
All values from Pro Day

=== New York Giants ===
After going unselected in the 2022 NFL draft, Gilbert was signed by the New York Giants as an undrafted free agent. He was released at the final roster cuts but was subsequently re-signed to the practice squad. Gilbert was elevated to the active roster for their week thirteen game with the Washington Commanders, and started at cornerback in his NFL debut, appearing on 62 snaps and recording seven tackles. He posted his first career sack the following week against the Philadelphia Eagles. He signed a reserve/future contract on January 22, 2023. He was waived on August 29, 2023.

=== Green Bay Packers ===
Gilbert was signed to the Green Bay Packers practice squad on October 25, 2023. He signed a reserve/future contract on January 22, 2024. On July 30, 2024, he was released.

=== Pittsburgh Steelers ===
On August 14, 2024, Gilbert signed with the Pittsburgh Steelers. He was waived on August 27, 2024 and was re-signed to the practice squad on August 29, 2024. He was released on September 17, and re-signed a month later.

=== Hamilton Tiger-Cats ===
On April 21, 2026, Gilbert signed with the Hamilton Tiger-Cats of the Canadian Football League. He was released on May 31, 2026.
