= Trenton Thompson (defensive back) =

American football player (born 1997)

No. 39, 17
- Position: Safety

Personal information
- Born: December 18, 1997 (age 28); Palm Springs, California, U.S.
- Listed height: 6 ft 1 in (1.85 m)
- Listed weight: 196 lb (89 kg)

Career information
- High school: Palm Springs
- College: San Diego State (2016–2021)
- NFL draft: 2022: undrafted

Career history
- New York Giants (2022); Pittsburgh Steelers (2023)

Career NFL statistics
- Interceptions: 1
- Total tackles: 22
- Pass deflections: 3
- Stats at Pro Football Reference

Trenton Thompson (born December 18, 1997) is an American former professional football player who was a safety in the National Football League (NFL) with the New York Giants and Pittsburgh Steelers. He played college football for the San Diego State Aztecs and was signed by the Giants as an undrafted free agent in 2022.

== Early life and college ==
Thompson was born on December 18, 1997, in Palm Springs, California. He attended Palm Springs High School and played three seasons of football there, earning two varsity letters. He helped them compile an overall record of 24–3 in his final two years, leading them to the CIF championship as a senior. At the time of his graduation, Thompson had recorded 219 total tackles, four interceptions, six fumbles forced as well as six blocked kicks. He was graded an 87/100 by 247Sports and was named a three-star recruit by several organizations, being ranked the 15th-best outside linebacker nationally by Scout.com.

Thompson received seven Division I scholarship offers and chose to attend San Diego State University. After missing the first six games of his true freshman season (2016), Thompson played as a backup to Malik Smith in the final eight, recording nine total tackles. The following season, he appeared in three games, making one tackle, before suffering a season-ending injury and redshirting.

As a sophomore in 2018, Thompson appeared in all 13 games, starting in eight, and totaled 57 tackles. He also made one interception, one forced fumble, and returned a blocked punt for a touchdown. He played in 12 games as a junior in 2019 and tallied 44 tackles and a blocked punt. In a COVID-19-shortened 2020 season, Thompson made 36 tackles and a blocked kick.

After being given an extra year of eligibility due to COVID-19, Thompson opted to return to San Diego State in 2021 and was elected a team captain. In his sixth year with the program, Thompson started 14 games and recorded 44 tackles, three interceptions, and a forced fumble. He also broke up 15 passes, good enough for second in the conference, on his way to being named first-team All-Mountain West. He was also selected second-team All-American by College Football Focus and third-team by Pro Football Network. Thompson finished his college career having played in 57 games, tied for the most in school history with Taylor Hawkins.

== Professional career ==
Pre-draft measurables
Height	Weight	Arm length	Hand span	40-yard dash	10-yard split	20-yard split	20-yard shuttle	Three-cone drill	Vertical jump	Broad jump	Bench press
6 ft 1 in (1.85 m)	196 lb (89 kg)	32 1/2 in (0.83 m)	9 1/4 in (0.23 m)	4.61 s	1.60 s	2.65 s	4.26 s	7.20 s	35.5 in (0.90 m)	9 ft 11 in (3.02 m)	11 reps
All values from Pro Day

=== New York Giants ===
After going unselected in the 2022 NFL draft, Thompson was signed by the New York Giants as an undrafted free agent, being given a three-year contract worth $2.572 million. Considered a long shot to make the final roster, he was released on August 30, but later re-signed to the practice squad. He was signed to the active roster on November 23, and made his NFL debut in the Giants' week twelve game against the Dallas Cowboys, appearing on twelve special teams snaps in the loss. Thompson was released afterwards and brought back to the practice squad. He signed a reserve/future contract on January 22, 2023.

On July 25, 2023, Thompson was waived by the Giants.

=== Pittsburgh Steelers ===
On August 2, 2023, Thompson signed with the Pittsburgh Steelers. He was waived by Pittsburgh on August 29, and re-signed to the practice squad. With injuries to the Steelers’ secondary, Thompson was elevated from the practice squad to the active roster on November 11, ahead of their game against the Green Bay Packers. On November 20, Thompson was promoted to the active roster. Thompson got his first interception against the Cincinnati Bengals on November 26.

Thompson was waived by the Bengals on June 19, 2024.

Thompson announced his retirement from the NFL on January 11, 2025 via his Instagram.
