= Shea Tierney =

American football coach (born 1986)

Tennessee Titans
- Title: Quarterbacks coach

Personal information
- Born: October 19, 1986 (age 40); Philadelphia, Pennsylvania, U.S.

Career information
- High school: Neshaminy (Langhorne, Pennsylvania)
- College: NC State

Career history
- NC State (2011–2012) Graduate assistant; Philadelphia Eagles (2013–2015) Football analyst & coaching intern; Alabama (2016–2017) Offensive analyst; Buffalo Bills (2018–2019) Offensive assistant; Buffalo Bills (2020–2021) Assistant quarterbacks coach; New York Giants (2022–2023) Quarterbacks coach; New York Giants (2024–2025) Pass game coordinator & quarterbacks coach; Tennessee Titans (2026–present) Quarterbacks coach

Awards and highlights
- CFP national champion (2017)

Shea Tierney (born October 19, 1986) is an American football coach who is the quarterbacks coach for the Tennessee Titans of the National Football League (NFL). He was most recently the New York Giants quarterbacks coach. Previously, Tierney worked for the Buffalo Bills in 2018 as an offensive assistant and was promoted to assistant quarterbacks coach in 2020. He also spent three seasons with the Philadelphia Eagles as an analyst and coaching intern, and also worked for Alabama as an offensive analyst.

== Coaching career ==
=== N.C. State ===
Beginning in 2011, Tierney spent three seasons with the NC State Wolfpack as an offensive graduate assistant.

=== Philadelphia Eagles ===
In 2013, Tierney was hired by the Philadelphia Eagles as an analyst and coaching intern.

=== Alabama ===
In 2016, Tierney acted as an offensive analyst under Coach Nick Saban and former New York Giants head coach Brian Daboll. Tierney assisted in leading the 2016 team to a 14–1 season, ending in an SEC Championship. He worked closely with Mike Locksley, former wide-receivers coach and current head coach at Maryland.

=== Buffalo Bills ===
In 2018, Tierney was hired by the Buffalo Bills as an offensive analyst, and was promoted to Assistant Quarterbacks Coach for the 2020 season. During his tenure with the Bills, Tierney helped to guide quarterback Josh Allen to finish second in the 2020 MVP voting and set single season franchise records for passing touchdowns (37), completions (396), 300 yard games (8), passer rating (107.2), completion percentage (69.2), passing yards (4,544) and total touchdowns (46). During the 2021 season, Allen had a career-high 409 pass completions, completing 63.3 percent of his passes for 4,407 passing yards, 36 passing touchdowns and a 92.2 passer rating. He also had 763 rushing yards and another six touchdowns on the ground, leading the league in yards per carry at 6.3

=== New York Giants ===
On February 2, 2022, Tierney was hired by the New York Giants as their quarterbacks coach. He followed Daboll, who was named head coach of the Giants five days prior. After the firing of Daboll in the 2025 season, new head coach John Harbaugh did not retain Tierney.

=== Tennessee Titans ===
On January 28, 2026, Tierney was hired by the Tennessee Titans to serve as the team's quarterbacks coach under new head coach Robert Saleh. Daboll was hired as the Titans Offensive coordinator the previous day, making the 2026 season the tenth consecutive season that Tierney would be working with Daboll.

== Personal life ==
In July 2021, Shea married Emily Seng in Raleigh, North Carolina.
