= Devery Hamilton =

German-American football player (born 1998)

Profile
- Position: Offensive tackle

Personal information
- Born: April 19, 1998 (age 28); Stuttgart, Germany
- Listed height: 6 ft 6 in (1.98 m)
- Listed weight: 311 lb (141 kg)

Career information
- High school: Gilman (MD)
- College: Stanford (2016–2019); Duke (2020)
- NFL draft: 2021: undrafted

Career history
- Las Vegas Raiders (2021)*; New York Giants (2021–2022); Pittsburgh Steelers (2024)*
- * Offseason or practice squad member only

Career NFL statistics as of 2023
- Games played: 9
- Stats at Pro Football Reference

Devery Bernard Hamilton Jr. (born April 19, 1998) is a German and American professional football offensive tackle. He played college football at Stanford and Duke and was signed by the Las Vegas Raiders as an undrafted free agent in 2021.

== Early life and college ==
Hamilton was born on April 19, 1998, in Stuttgart, Germany to an African-American father and German mother. He lived there until he was 9 years old, when his family moved to Maryland. He was "big" for his age, and several people said that he would be a good football player, although he didn't even know what the sport was. "A few people would say that and I was like, I really don't know what it is," Hamilton said. "Then I saw an ad for a football team when I was at the barber shop and asked my dad, 'can you call and see if I can get into this? I want to try it.'"

Several years later, Hamilton was a star football player at Gilman School in Baltimore, earning four varsity letters and all-state honors in the sport. He was named a four-star prospect by Scout.com, Rivals.com and 247Sports. Scout.com ranked him the 10th-best offensive tackle nationally.

After graduating from high school, Hamilton committed to the University of Michigan, but then swapped his commitment to Stanford, despite agreeing to play for the Michigan Wolverines. As a freshman with the Stanford Cardinal in 2016, he did not see any action. In 2017 as a sophomore, he earned Pac-12 All-Academic honors while playing in 12 games.

In his junior season, 2018, Hamilton started six games, three at left guard, two at right guard and one at left tackle while earning second-team Pac-12 All-Academic honors. He started in the first four games of the 2019 season before suffering a season-ending ankle injury.

Hamilton transferred to Duke for the 2020 season. In one season with the school, he started all 11 games and helped block for an offense that averaged 397.7 yards of offense per game. Although he had a remaining year of eligibility in 2021, he decided to declare for the NFL draft.

== Professional career ==
Pre-draft measurables
Height	Weight	Arm length	Hand span	40-yard dash	10-yard split	20-yard split	20-yard shuttle	Three-cone drill	Vertical jump	Broad jump	Bench press
6 ft 6 5/8 in (2.00 m)	311 lb (141 kg)	33 in (0.84 m)	10 1/8 in (0.26 m)	5.27 s	1.74 s	2.99 s	4.89 s	7.81 s	33.5 in (0.85 m)	9 ft 4 in (2.84 m)	21 reps
All values from Pro Day

=== Las Vegas Raiders ===
After going unselected in the 2021 NFL draft, Hamilton was signed by the Las Vegas Raiders as an undrafted free agent. He was released on August 6, but re-signed on August 23. He was waived on August 30, as part of the final roster cuts. The following day, Hamilton was signed to the Raiders' practice squad. He was released from the practice squad on September 24.

=== New York Giants ===
Hamilton was signed to the practice squad of the New York Giants on October 13, 2021. On January 10, 2022, he was signed to a reserve/future contract by the Giants.

Hamilton impressed in the 2022 training camp and made the final roster as New York's ninth offensive lineman. He made his NFL debut in week one against the Tennessee Titans. On November 14, 2022, he was waived and the next day he signed to their practice squad. On November 23, he was promoted to the active roster, then waived two days later and re-signed back to the practice squad. He signed a reserve/future contract on January 22, 2023. He was waived/injured on August 15.

=== Pittsburgh Steelers ===
On January 17, 2024, Hamilton signed a reserve/futures contract with the Pittsburgh Steelers. He was waived on August 26.
