= 2026 New York Giants season =

102nd season in franchise history

- Owner: John Mara
- General manager: Joe Schoen
- President: John Mara
- Head coach: John Harbaugh
- Offensive coordinator: Matt Nagy
- Defensive coordinator: Dennard Wilson
- Home stadium: MetLife Stadium

Results
- Record: 5–3–1
- Division place: 1st NFC East

Uniform
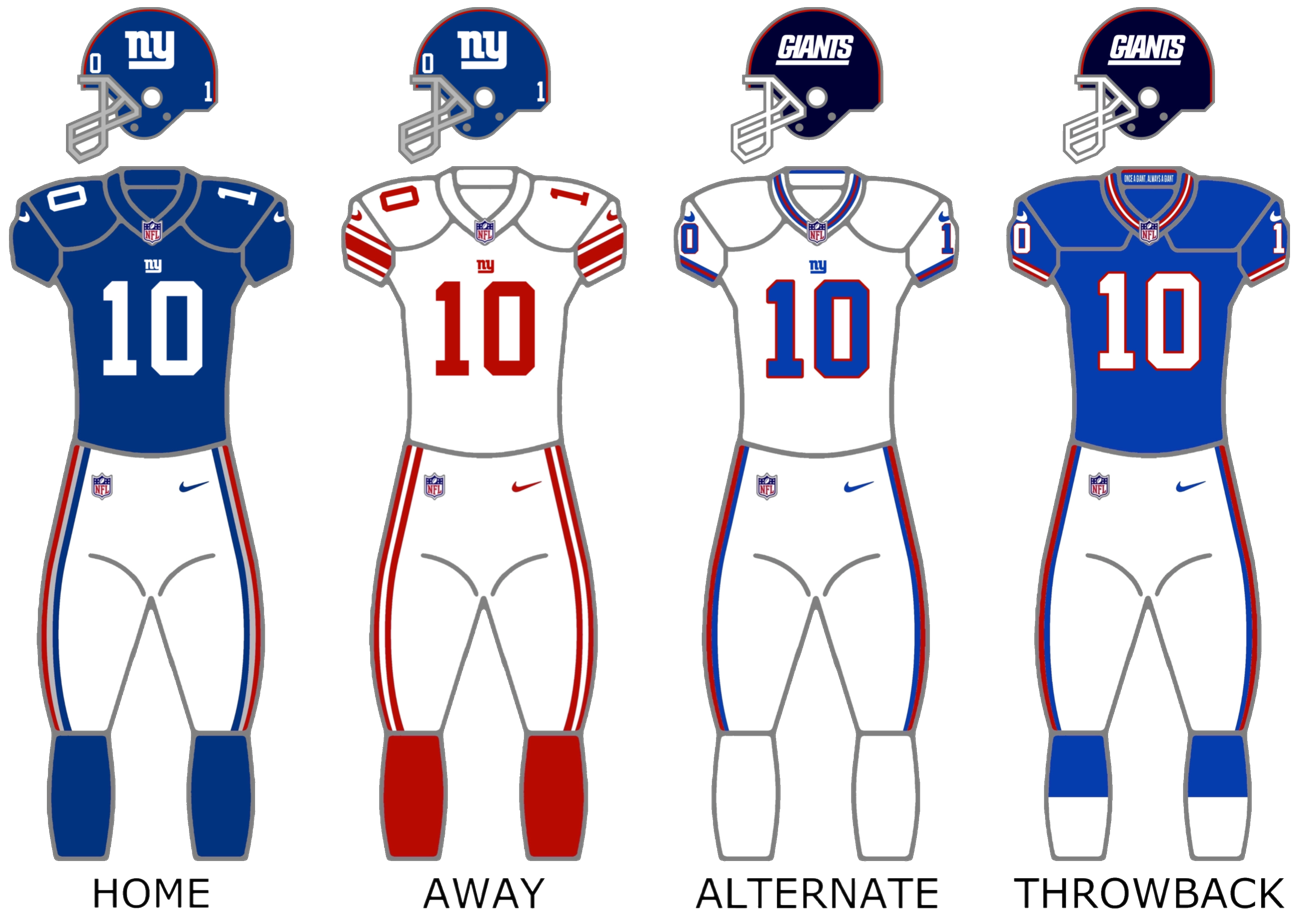

The 2026 season is the New York Giants' 102nd in the National Football League (NFL), their fifth under general manager Joe Schoen and their first season under head coach John Harbaugh. Harbaugh spent the previous 18 seasons with the Baltimore Ravens. They will seek to make the playoffs after a three-year absence, end their 14-year NFC East title drought, which is currently the longest active drought in the NFC, and put an end to three consecutive seasons with fewer than seven wins. The Giants improved upon their 4–13 record from the previous season after a Week 7 win over the Houston Texans in overtime.

This will be the first season since 2018 without either Dexter Lawrence or Darius Slayton on the roster. Lawrence was traded to the Cincinnati Bengals in exchange for the 10th overall pick in the 2026 NFL Draft, which they used to draft Francis Mauigoa, while Slayton was released on September 7. The Giants drafted Arvell Reese with the 5th overall pick, making him the highest draft pick a John Harbaugh-coached team has had, ahead of Ronnie Stanley 6th overall in 2016 with the Ravens. Upon his hiring, Harbaugh would take a multitude of former Ravens with him. This will also be the first season since 2021 that Brian Daboll is not the head coach of the Giants, as he was fired midseason last year and was subsequently hired to be the offensive coordinator for the Tennessee Titans.

== Offseason ==
=== Coaching changes ===
On November 10, 2025, head coach Brian Daboll was fired by the Giants following a 2–8 start to the 2025 season. Mike Kafka was promoted to interim head coach, leading the Giants to a 2–5 record to conclude the season. On January 17, 2026, the Giants hired John Harbaugh as the new head coach.

On January 25, the Giants hired former Tennessee Titans defensive coordinator, Dennard Wilson, as their new defensive coordinator. Wilson previously served under Harbaugh as the Ravens' defensive backs coach in 2023.

On February 3, the Giants hired former Kansas City Chiefs offensive coordinator, Matt Nagy, as their new offensive coordinator.

=== Roster movement ===
==== Arrivals ====
Position	Player	2025 Team	Date signed	Contract
TE	Isaiah Likely	Baltimore Ravens	March 9, 2026	3 years, $40 million
LB	Tremaine Edmunds	Chicago Bears	March 9, 2026	3 years, $36 million
P	Jordan Stout	Baltimore Ravens	March 9, 2026	3 years, $12.3 million
S	Ar'Darius Washington	Baltimore Ravens	March 9, 2026	1 year, $3 million
CB	Greg Newsome II	Jacksonville Jaguars	March 10, 2026	1 year, $8 million
K	Jason Sanders	Miami Dolphins	March 10, 2026	1 year, $4.5 million
FB	Patrick Ricard	Baltimore Ravens	March 10, 2026	2 years, $7.6 million
WR	Calvin Austin	Pittsburgh Steelers	March 12, 2026	1 year, $1.5 million
S	Jason Pinnock	San Francisco 49ers	March 13, 2026	1 year, $1.2 million
S	Elijah Campbell	Miami Dolphins	March 13, 2026	1 year, $1.2 million
WR	Darnell Mooney	Atlanta Falcons	March 14, 2026	1 year, $3.5 million
DT	Sam Roberts	Atlanta Falcons	March 23, 2026	1 year, $1.075 million
LS	Zach Triner	Washington Commanders	March 24, 2026	1 year, $1.075 million
LB	Cam Jones	New York Jets	March 24, 2026	1 year, $1.3 million
G	Lucas Patrick	Cincinnati Bengals	April 6, 2026	1 year, $1.49 million
G	Daniel Faalele	Baltimore Ravens	April 8, 2026	1 year, $1.4M million
QB	Brandon Allen	Tennessee Titans	April 13, 2026	1 year, $1.45 million
DT	Shelby Harris	Cleveland Browns	April 28, 2026	1 year, $3 million
DT	Leki Fotu	Houston Texans	April 29, 2026	1 year, $1.29 million
DT	DJ Reader	Detroit Lions	May 5, 2026	2 years, $12.5 million
DT	Zacch Pickens	Kansas City Chiefs	May 5, 2026	1 year, $1.145 million
LB	Khalid Kareem	Atlanta Falcons	May 14, 2026	1 year, $1.075 million
WR	Braxton Berrios	Houston Texans	June 1, 2026	1 year, $1.3 million
WR	Odell Beckham Jr.	Miami Dolphins (2024)	June 1, 2026	1 year, $1.3 million
WR	JuJu Smith-Schuster	Kansas City Chiefs	June 1, 2026	1 year, $1. million
RB	Najee Harris	Los Angeles Chargers	August 18, 2026	1 year

==== Re-signed ====
Position	Player	Date re-signed	Contract
WR	Gunner Olszewski	March 5, 2026	1 year, $1.26 million
RT	Jermaine Eluemunor	March 9, 2026	3 years, $39 million
WR	Isaiah Hodgins	March 9, 2026	1 year, $1.1 million
TE	Chris Manhertz	March 9, 2026	1 year, $1.26 million
CB	Art Green	March 10, 2026	1 year, $1.075 million
LB	Micah McFadden	March 10, 2026	1 year, $3.76 million
OLB	Caleb Murphy	March 10, 2026	1 year, $1.145 million
LB	Zaire Barnes	March 11, 2026	1 year, $1.15 million
G	Evan Neal	March 11, 2026	1 year, $1.075 million
G	Aaron Stinnie	March 12, 2026	1 year, $1.265 million
WR	Ryan Miller	March 12, 2026	1 year, $1.075 million
CB	Nic Jones	March 12, 2026	1 year, $1.075 million
G	Josh Ezeudu	March 18, 2026	1 year, $1.25 million

==== Departures ====
Position	Player	2026 team	Date signed	Contract
WR	Wan'Dale Robinson	Tennessee Titans	March 9, 2026	3 years, $78 million
CB	Cordale Flott	Tennessee Titans	March 9, 2026	3 years, $45 million
TE	Daniel Bellinger	Tennessee Titans	March 9, 2026	3 years, $24 million
C	Austin Schlottmann	Tennessee Titans	March 9, 2026	2 years, $9 million
S	Dane Belton	New York Jets	March 10, 2026	1 year, $6 million
LS	Casey Kreiter	Arizona Cardinals	March 11, 2026	1 year, $1 million
DT	Dexter Lawrence	Cincinnati Bengals (via trade for 10th overall pick)	April 19, 2026	1 year, $28 million

=== Draft ===
2026 New York Giants draft selections
Round	Selection	Player	Position	College	Notes
1	5	Arvell Reese	LB	Ohio State	
1	10	Francis Mauigoa	OT	Miami (FL)	From Bengals (Note: The Giants traded DT Dexter Lawrence to the Cincinnati Bengals in exchange for their first-round selection (10th overall).)
2	37	Colton Hood	CB	Tennessee	
3	69	Traded to the Houston Texans (Note: The Giants traded a third-round selection (69th overall), and 2025 second- and third-round selections to the Houston Texans in exchange for a 2025 first-round selection.)			
3	74	Malachi Fields	WR	Notre Dame	From Browns (Note: The Giants traded their fourth-round selection (105 overall), their fifth-round selection (145 overall) and a 2027 fourth-round selection to the Cleveland Browns for their third-round selection (74th overall).)
4	105	Traded to the Cleveland Browns			
5	145	Traded to the Cleveland Browns			
6	186	Bobby Jamison-Travis	DT	Auburn	
6	192	J. C. Davis	T	Illinois	From Dolphins (Note: The Giants traded a conditional 2027 seventh-round selection and TE Darren Waller to the Miami Dolphins in exchange for a sixth-round selection (192nd overall).)
6	193	Jack Kelly	LB	BYU	From Cowboys (Note: The Giants traded a seventh-round selection (221st overall) and DL Jordan Phillips to the Dallas Cowboys in exchange for a sixth-round selection (193rd overall).)
7	221	Traded to the Dallas Cowboys			

2026 New York Giants undrafted free agents
Name	Position	College	Ref.
Damon Bankston	RB	New Mexico	
Anquin Barnes Jr.	DT	Colorado	
Ben Barten	DT	Wisconsin	
Thaddeus Dixon	CB	North Carolina	
Ben Mann	LS	Boston College	
Ryan Schernecke	OT	Kutztown	
Dominic Zvada	PK	Michigan	

Draft trades

== Staff ==
New York Giants staff
Front office: President/CEO – John Mara; Chairman/executive vice president – Steve Tisch; Senior vice president of football operations and strategy – Dawn Aponte; Senior vice president & general manager – Joe Schoen; Assistant general manager – Brandon Brown; Senior personnel executive – Dennis Hickey; Senior player personnel executive – Chris Mara; Director of player personnel – Tim McDonnell; Director of college scouting – John Ritcher; Director of pro scouting – Chris Rosetti; Assistant director of pro scouting – Nick La Testa; Director of football operations – Ed Triggs; Director of football data and innovation – Tyseer Siam; Head coaches: Head coach – John Harbaugh; Assistant head coach/special teams coordinator – Chris Horton; Offensive coaches: Offensive coordinator – Matt Nagy; Quarterbacks/pass game coordinator – Brian Callahan; Running backs – Willie Taggart; Wide receivers – Chad Hall; Tight ends – Tim Kelly; Offensive line – Mike Bloomgren; Assistant offensive line – Grant Newsome; Senior offensive assistant – Greg Roman; Offensive quality control – Adam Schrack; Offensive quality control – Mike Snyder; Football analyst/quality control – Noah Riley	Defensive coaches: Defensive coordinator – Dennard Wilson; Defensive line – Dennis Johnson; Outside linebackers/run game coordinator – Charlie Bullen; Inside linebackers – Frank Bush; Assistant linebackers – Matt Pees; Secondary/pass game coordinator – Donald D'Alesio; Defensive backs – Addison Lynch; Defensive quality control – Brendan Clark; Assistant to the head coach/defensive assistant – Megan Rosburg; Special teams coaches: Assistant special teams – T. J. Weist; Football analysts: Football analyst – Bonner Bordelon; Football analyst – Taylor Kolste; Football analyst – Kyrell Michael; Football analyst – Skyler Mornhinweg; Football analyst – Patrick Moynahan; Strength and performance: Executive director of player performance – Aaron Wellman; Director of high performance – Sam Rosengarten; Director of strength and conditioning – Ron Shrift; Assistant director of strength and conditioning – Drew Wilson; Performance manager/assistant strength and conditioning – Sam Coad; Assistant strength and conditioning – Chris Allen; Assistant strength and conditioning – Mark Naylor; Assistant strength – Brian Ellis; Director of performance nutrition – Matthew Frakes; → Coaching staff → Front office → More NFL staffs

== Current roster ==
New York Giants roster
Quarterbacks (QB): 18 J. J. McCarthy; 19 Jameis Winston; Running backs (RB): 30 Gregory Desrosiers; 45 Patrick Ricard FB; 26 Devin Singletary; 44 Cam Skattebo; Wide receivers (WR): 88 Malachi Fields; 80 Xavier Gipson; 81 Jalin Hyatt; 17 Darnell Mooney; 1 Malik Nabers; Tight ends (TE): 86 Thomas Fidone; 84 Theo Johnson; 9 Isaiah Likely; 85 Chris Manhertz	Offensive linemen (OL): 74 J. C. Davis T; 72 Jermaine Eluemunor T; 60 Bryan Hudson C; 65 Francis Mauigoa G; 71 Marcus Mbow T; 76 Jon Runyan Jr. G; 61 John Michael Schmitz C; 67 Josh Sills T; 64 Aaron Stinnie G; 78 Andrew Thomas T; Defensive linemen (DL): 91 Darius Alexander; 93 Shelby Harris; 97 Bobby Jamison-Travis; 99 C. J. Okoye; 98 D. J. Reader	Linebackers (LB): 46 Zaire Barnes; 3 Abdul Carter OLB; 48 Trace Ford OLB; 54 Malik Harrison; 51 Jack Kelly; 41 Micah McFadden; 52 Arvell Reese; 5 Kayvon Thibodeaux OLB; Defensive backs (DB): 21 Paulson Adebo CB; 2 Deonte Banks CB; 28 Elijah Campbell S; 8 Jevon Holland S; 12 Colton Hood CB; 31 Nic Jones CB; 20 Greg Newsome II CB; 27 Tyler Nubin S; 22 Dru Phillips CB; 25 Jason Pinnock S; 37 Tavierre Thomas S; 24 Ar'Darius Washington S; Special teams (ST): 58 Ben Mann LS; 15 Jordan Stout P; 34 Dominic Zvada K	Practice squad: 83 Dalen Cambre WR; 47 Grant Finley FB; 38 Dontae Fleming WR; 68 Josh Gesky OL; 79 Jarrod Gray OL (IPP); 53 Kendrick Green OL; 13 Jake Haener QB; 89 Charlie Jones WR; 43 Raheem Layne S; 75 Dean Lowry DL; 36 Phil Mafah RB; 55 Chandler Martin LB; 90 P. J. Mustipher DT; 35 Nikko Reed CB; 33 Jaden Robinson CB; 70 Ryan Schernecke T; 96 Dawuane Smoot OLB; Reserve: 82 Calvin Austin WR (IR); -- Jarrick Bernard-Converse CB (IR); 87 Braxton Berrios WR (IR); -- Korie Black CB (IR); 0 Brian Burns OLB (IR); 6 Jaxson Dart QB (IR); 39 Thaddeus Dixon CB (IR); 49 Tremaine Edmunds LB (IR); 57 Chauncey Golston DE (IR); -- Gunner Olszewski WR (IR); -- Rico Payton CB (IR); 95 Roy Robertson-Harris DT (IR); 29 Tyrone Tracy Jr. RB (IR) 53 active, 16 practice squad (1 IPP), 13 reserve As of November 18, 2026. Rookies in italics.; Roster; Depth chart; Transactions

== Preseason ==
Week	Date	Opponent	Result	Record	Venue	Recap
1	August 15	Minnesota Vikings	L 10–13	0–1	MetLife Stadium	Recap
2	August 22	at Miami Dolphins	W 26–3	1–1	Hard Rock Stadium	Recap
3	August 28	at New York Jets	W 23–6	2–1	MetLife Stadium	Recap

== Regular season ==
=== Schedule ===
Week	Date	Time (ET)	Opponent	Result	Record	Venue	Network	Recap
1	September 13	8:20 p.m.	**Dallas Cowboys**	**W** 28–20	1–0	MetLife Stadium	NBC	Recap
2	September 21	8:15 p.m.	at Los Angeles Rams	**L** 6–28	1–1	SoFi Stadium	ESPN/ABC	Recap
3	September 27	1:00 p.m.	Tennessee Titans	**W** 12–7	2–1	MetLife Stadium	CBS	Recap
4	October 4	1:00 p.m.	Arizona Cardinals	**W** 36–24	3–1	MetLife Stadium	CBS	Recap
5	October 11	1:00 p.m.	at **Washington Commanders**	**T** 27–27 (OT)	3–1–1	Northwest Stadium	Fox	Recap
6	October 18	1:00 p.m.	New Orleans Saints	**L** 27–34	3–2–1	MetLife Stadium	Fox	Recap
7	October 25	1:00 p.m.	at Houston Texans	**W** 27–21 (OT)	4–2–1	Reliant Stadium	Fox	Recap
8	Bye							
9	November 8	1:00 p.m.	at **Philadelphia Eagles**	**W** 19–11	5–2–1	Lincoln Financial Field	Fox	Recap
10	November 12	8:15 p.m.	**Washington Commanders**	**L** 21–24	5–3–1	MetLife Stadium	Prime Video	Recap
11	November 22	4:25 p.m.	Jacksonville Jaguars			MetLife Stadium	CBS	
12	November 29	1:00 p.m.	at Indianapolis Colts			Lucas Oil Stadium	Fox	
13	December 6	1:00 p.m.	San Francisco 49ers			MetLife Stadium	Fox	
14	December 13	4:25 p.m.	at Seattle Seahawks			Lumen Field	Fox	
15	December 20	1:00 p.m.	Cleveland Browns			MetLife Stadium	CBS	
16	December 28	8:15 p.m.	at Detroit Lions			Ford Field	ESPN	
17	January 3	1:00 p.m.	at **Dallas Cowboys**			AT&T Stadium	Fox	
18	January 9/10	TBD	**Philadelphia Eagles**			MetLife Stadium	TBD	

Notes

- Intra-division opponents are in **bold** text.
- Networks, dates and times from Weeks 13–17 are subject to change as a result of flexible scheduling.
- The date, time and network for Week 18 will be finalized at the end of Week 17.

=== Game summaries ===
==== Week 1: vs. Dallas Cowboys ====
Week 1: Dallas Cowboys at New York Giants – Game summary

Quarter	1	2	3	4	Total
Cowboys	0	7	7	6	**20**
**Giants**	7	7	7	7	**28**

at MetLife Stadium, East Rutherford, New Jersey

- Date: September 13
- Game time: 8:20 p.m. EDT
- Game weather: Fair, 80 °F (27 °C)
- Game attendance: 83,286
- Referee: Carl Cheffers
- TV announcers (NBC): Mike Tirico, Cris Collinsworth and Melissa Stark
- Recap, Game Book

Game information

**First quarter**

- NYG – Cam Skattebo 3-yard run (Dominic Zvada kick), 6:40. Giants 7–0. **Drive: 10 plays, 83 yards, 6:13.**

**Second quarter**

- DAL – CeeDee Lamb 1-yard pass from Dak Prescott (Brandon Aubrey kick), 5:44. Tied 7–7. **Drive: 10 plays, 85 yards, 6:44.**
- NYG – Isaiah Likely 15-yard pass from Jaxson Dart (Dominic Zvada kick), 0:20. Giants 14–7. **Drive: 6 plays, 55 yards, 0:29.**

**Third quarter**

- NYG – Isaiah Likely 2-yard pass from Jaxson Dart (Dominic Zvada kick), 6:59. Giants 21–7. **Drive: 6 plays, 55 yards, 0:29.**
- DAL – Javonte Williams 1-yard run (Brandon Aubrey kick), 0:37. Giants 21–14. **Drive: 12 plays, 75 yards, 6:22.**

**Fourth quarter**

- NYG – Devin Singletary 9-yard pass from Jaxson Dart (Dominic Zvada kick), 7:26. Giants 28–14. **Drive: 13 plays, 65 yards, 8:11.**
- DAL – Javonte Williams 17-yard pass from Dak Prescott (kick failed), 5:21. Giants 28–20. **Drive: 9 plays, 74 yards, 2:05.**

**Top passers**

- DAL – Dak Prescott – 22/34, 175 yards, 2 TD, INT
- NYG – Jaxson Dart – 23/29, 230 yards, 3 TD

**Top rushers**

- DAL – Javonte Williams – 12 rushes, 41 yards, TD
- NYG – Cam Skattebo – 18 rushes, 81 yards, TD

**Top receivers**

- DAL – CeeDee Lamb – 5 receptions, 44 yards, TD
- NYG – Isaiah Likely – 8 receptions, 78 yards, 2 TD

In John Harbaugh's first game as the head coach of the Giants, the team put together a strong effort on offense. Cam Skattebo capped off the Giants' opening drive with a touchdown in his first game back from the ankle injury he suffered the previous season. With the game tied at 7–7 late in the first half, Tyrone Tracy Jr. fumbled and lost the ball when the Giants were in field goal range, but Dak Prescott returned the favor by throwing an interception to Jevon Holland with under a minute left. The Giants capitalized on the takeaway, with Jaxson Dart throwing a touchdown to Isaiah Likely for his first of two touchdown receptions on the night. Despite allowing touchdowns on both defensive drives in the second half, the Giants maintained control of possession and won 28–20.

The Giants started 1–0 for the first time since 2022. This was also the first Giants Week 1 victory at home since 2010, which happened to be the inaugural game at MetLife Stadium. With the Jets defeating the Titans earlier in the day, it would be the first time both New York teams would win their opening game since 2009.

==== Week 2: at Los Angeles Rams ====
Week 2: New York Giants at Los Angeles Rams – Game summary

Quarter	1	2	3	4	Total
Giants	0	3	3	0	**6**
**Rams**	7	7	7	7	**28**

at SoFi Stadium, Inglewood, California

- Date: September 21
- Game time: 8:15 p.m. EDT/5:15 p.m. PDT
- Game weather: Sunny, 76 °F (24 °C) (fixed roof)
- Game attendance: 73,773
- Referee: Brad Allen
- TV announcers (ESPN/ABC): Joe Buck, Troy Aikman, Lisa Salters, and Laura Rutledge
- Recap, Game Book

Game information

**First quarter**

- LAR – Davante Adams 31-yard pass from Matthew Stafford (Harrison Mevis kick), 0:11. Rams 7–0. **Drive: 8 plays, 80 yards, 5:24.**

**Second quarter**

- LAR – Kyren Williams 10-yard pass from Matthew Stafford (Harrison Mevis kick), 11:07. Rams 14–0. **Drive: 6 plays, 78 yards, 3:28.**
- NYG – Dominic Zvada 24-yard field goal, 0:25. Rams 14–3. **Drive: 4 plays, 5 yards, 2:41.**

**Third quarter**

- LAR – Davante Adams 11-yard pass from Matthew Stafford (Harrison Mevis kick), 6:21. Rams 21–3. **Drive: 7 plays, 86 yards, 3:35.**
- NYG – Dominic Zvada 52-yard field goal, 3:49. Rams 21–6. **Drive: 7 plays, 18 yards, 2:32.**

**Fourth quarter**

- LAR – Terrance Ferguson 5-yard pass from Matthew Stafford (Harrison Mevis kick), 8:57. Rams 28–6. **Drive: 9 plays, 64 yards, 5:36.**

**Top passers**

- NYG – Jameis Winston – 11/27, 111 yards, INT
- LAR – Matthew Stafford – 22/31, 327 yards, 4 TD, INT

**Top rushers**

- NYG – Cam Skattebo – 12 rushes, 36 yards
- LAR – Kyren Williams – 12 rushes, 85 yards

**Top receivers**

- NYG – Darnell Mooney – 2 receptions, 48 yards
- LAR – Davante Adams – 8 receptions, 195 yards, 2 TD

After Jaxson Dart suffered a knee injury on the opening drive and did not return, the Jameis Winston-led Giants offense was completely stymied and only able to muster two field goals. Safety Jevón Holland forced two turnovers, including a fumble which gave the Giants the ball in the red zone and led to their first field goal right before halftime. Davante Adams of the Rams finished with more receiving yards than the Giants had yards as a team.

With their fifth consecutive loss to the Rams dating back to 2017, the Giants fell to 1–1.

Two days later, it was determined that Dart's knee injury included a torn meniscus and MCL, as well as a PCL sprain, which would require season-ending surgery.

==== Week 3: vs. Tennessee Titans ====
Week 3: Tennessee Titans at New York Giants – Game summary

Quarter	1	2	3	4	Total
Titans	0	0	0	7	**7**
**Giants**	3	6	3	0	**12**

at MetLife Stadium, East Rutherford, New Jersey

- Date: September 27
- Game time: 1:00 p.m. EDT
- Game weather: Light rain, 62 °F (17 °C)
- Game attendance: 79,919
- Referee: Alan Eck
- TV announcers (CBS): Andrew Catalon, Logan Ryan and AJ Ross
- Recap, Game Book

Game information

**First quarter**

- NYG – Dominic Zvada 39-yard field goal, 6:34. Giants 3–0. **Drive: 8 plays, 50 yards, 4:15.**

**Second quarter**

- NYG – Dominic Zvada 27-yard field goal, 4:49. Giants 6–0. **Drive: 11 plays, 44 yards, 7:10.**
- NYG – Dominic Zvada 39-yard field goal, 0:00. Giants 9–0. **Drive: 7 plays, 30 yards, 0:41.**

**Third quarter**

- NYG – Dominic Zvada 30-yard field goal, 6:56. Giants 12–0. **Drive: 12 plays, 59 yards, 8:04.**

**Fourth quarter**

- TEN – Wan'Dale Robinson 4-yard pass from Cam Ward (Joey Slye kick), 5:35. Giants 12–7. **Drive: 13 plays, 91 yards, 7:08.**

**Top passers**

- TEN – Cam Ward – 23/36, 181 yards, TD, INT
- NYG – Jameis Winston – 14/22, 118 yards

**Top rushers**

- TEN – Tony Pollard – 17 rushes, 74 yards
- NYG – Cam Skattebo – 20 rushes, 60 yards

**Top receivers**

- TEN – Carnell Tate – 6 receptions, 58 yards
- NYG – Cam Skattebo – 3 receptions, 40 yards

On a rainy and windy afternoon in the middle of a nor'easter, Brian Daboll returned to MetLife Stadium as the Titans offensive coordinator after being fired by the Giants the previous season. It was also a reunion for Giants quarterbacks coach Brian Callahan and defensive coordinator Dennard Wilson, who were the head coach and defensive coordinator of the Titans from 2024 to 2025. Furthermore, this was Titans head coach Robert Saleh's first game back in MetLife Stadium after he was fired as the head coach of the Jets in 2024.

Despite a messy performance on offense, the Giants special teams helped them out most of the day. Rookie kicker Dominic Zvada made all four of his field goal attempts, and punter Jordan Stout kicked 6 times for 303 yards (with 265 net) and pinned the Titans inside their own 20-yard line three times. The defense held off a late Titans rally when safety Jevón Holland intercepted Cam Ward in the end zone with 20 seconds left to seal a 12–7 Giants victory. It was Holland’s third interception in as many games and fourth takeaway overall, and he was named the NFC Defensive Player for the Month of September for his performance in the first 3 weeks.

Despite failing to score a touchdown for the second straight game, the Giants won a game without finding the end zone for the first time since Week 8 of the 2013 season. Additionally, this marked the first time since 2009 that the Giants won their first two home games of the season.

However, the Giants were dealt another season-ending injury, later announcing that linebacker Brian Burns had suffered a torn ACL. It was also Odell Beckham Jr.'s final game with the Giants, as he was released two days later, ending his short-lived reunion with the team.

On September 28, quarterback J. J. McCarthy was acquired from the Minnesota Vikings for a 2027 fifth-round draft pick.

==== Week 4: vs. Arizona Cardinals ====
Week 4: Arizona Cardinals at New York Giants – Game summary

Quarter	1	2	3	4	Total
Cardinals	14	3	7	0	**24**
**Giants**	3	16	8	9	**36**

at MetLife Stadium, East Rutherford, New Jersey

- Date: October 4
- Game time: 1:00 p.m. EDT
- Game weather: Overcast, 63 °F (17 °C)
- Game attendance: 80,893
- Referee: Shawn Smith
- TV announcers (CBS): Spero Dedes, Adam Archuleta and Aditi Kinkhabwala
- Recap, Game Book

Game information

**First quarter**

- ARI – Marvin Harrison Jr. 12-yard pass from Jacoby Brissett (Chad Ryland kick), 11:08. Cardinals 7–0. **Drive: 8 plays, 58 yards, 3:52.**
- NYG – Dominic Zvada 39-yard field goal, 6:36. Cardinals 7–3. **Drive: 10 plays, 56 yards, 4:32.**
- ARI – Tyler Allgeier 22-yard run (Chad Ryland kick), 3:05. Cardinals 14–3. **Drive: 6 plays, 74 yards, 3:31.**

**Second quarter**

- NYG – Dominic Zvada 50-yard field goal, 14:55. Cardinals 14–6. **Drive: 6 plays, 13 yards, 3:10.**
- NYG – Malachi Fields 12-yard pass from Jameis Winston (pass failed), 4:30. Cardinals 14–12. **Drive: 7 plays, 56 yards, 3:57.**
- NYG – Malik Nabers 25-yard pass from Jameis Winston (Dominic Zvada kick), 2:24. Giants 19–14. **Drive: 2 plays, 26 yards, 0:45.**
- ARI – Chad Ryland 60-yard field goal, 0:00. Giants 19–17. **Drive: 4 plays, 33 yards, 0:24.**

**Third quarter**

- ARI – Elijah Higgins 2-yard pass from Jacoby Brissett (Chad Ryland kick), 7:20. Cardinals 24–19. **Drive: 10 plays, 37 yards, 5:09.**
- NYG – Theo Johnson 11-yard pass from Jameis Winston (Najee Harris run), 1:44. Giants 27–24. **Drive: 9 plays, 76 yards, 5:36.**

**Fourth quarter**

- NYG – Dominic Zvada 52-yard field goal, 2:11. Giants 30–24. **Drive: 7 plays, 16 yards, 2:36.**
- NYG – Deonte Banks 98-yard interception return, 0:00. Giants 36–24.

**Top passers**

- ARI – Jacoby Brissett – 21/35, 166 yards, 2 TD, 3 INT
- NYG – Jameis Winston – 18/29, 250 yards, 3 TD, 2 INT

**Top rushers**

- ARI – Jeremiyah Love – 14 rushes, 63 yards
- NYG – Cam Skattebo – 18 rushes, 56 yards

**Top receivers**

- ARI – Michael Wilson – 7 receptions, 95 yards
- NYG – Malik Nabers – 6 receptions, 112 yards, TD

The Giants honored the 1986 team at halftime to celebrate the 40th anniversary of Super Bowl XXI, and the defense responded in kind with a game-winning goal line stand. They won their first three home games for the first time since 2008.

The Cardinals ran wild on the Giants in the first quarter with 81 rushing yards and a 14–3 lead, but rookie LB Arvell Reese took over in the second quarter, racking up 4 tackles, one interception and a QB hit leading to a Greg Newsome II interception by halftime. The offense began to find its rhythm, scoring touchdowns for the first time since Week 1. Rookie WR Malachi Fields scored his first NFL touchdown and Malik Nabers scored for the first time since returning from his injury the year prior. Arizona retook the lead in the third quarter after two Jameis Winston interceptions, but Winston found Theo Johnson to reclaim the lead for the Giants.

Dominic Zvada made a 52-yard field goal with 2:11 to play to extend the Giants' lead to 6, and the Cardinals urgently marched down the field knowing they needed a touchdown. On 3rd and 5 from the opposing 22-yard line with 22 seconds to play, Deonte Banks was controversially called for pass interference. After 3 pass breakups by the defense, Banks intercepted Jacoby Brissett's pass and returned it 98 yards to the end zone for a walk-off pick six, the first pick six for the Giants since 2023.

The Eagles' loss to the Rams ensured the Giants had sole possession of first place in the NFC East for the first time since Week 11 of 2015.

==== Week 5: at Washington Commanders ====
Week 5: New York Giants at Washington Commanders – Game summary

Quarter	1	2	3	4	OT	Total
Giants	3	0	10	14	0	**27**
Commanders	6	6	7	8	0	**27**

at Northwest Stadium, Landover, Maryland

- Date: October 11
- Game time: 1:00 p.m. EDT
- Game weather: Rain, 64 °F (18 °C)
- Game attendance: 64,195
- Referee: Clete Blakeman
- TV announcers (Fox): Chris Myers, Jonathan Vilma and Megan Olivi
- Recap, Game Book

Game information

**First quarter**

- WSH – Jacory Croskey-Merritt 33-yard run (kick failed), 13:00. Commanders 6–0. **Drive: 4 plays, 69 yards, 2:00.**
- NYG – Dominic Zvada 51-yard field goal, 0:55. Commanders 6–3. **Drive: 5 plays, 22 yards, 1:40.**

**Second quarter**

- WSH – Drew Stevens 28-yard field goal, 8:57. Commanders 9–3. **Drive: 14 plays, 63 yards, 6:58.**
- WSH – Drew Stevens 40-yard field goal, 1:02. Commanders 12–3. **Drive: 4 plays, 5 yards, 0:56.**

**Third quarter**

- NYG – Dominic Zvada 56-yard field goal, 10:54. Commanders 12–6. **Drive: 7 plays, 30 yards, 4:06.**
- WSH – Jayden Daniels 38-yard run (Drew Stevens kick), 7:47. Commanders 19–6. **Drive: 5 plays, 77 yards, 3:07.**
- NYG – Isaiah Likely 3-yard pass from Jameis Winston (Dominic Zvada kick), 0:44. Commanders 19–13. **Drive: 13 plays, 63 yards, 7:03.**

**Fourth quarter**

- WSH – Jayden Daniels 26-yard run (Jayden Daniels–Terry McLaurin pass), 11:05. Commanders 27–13. **Drive: 8 plays, 81 yards, 4:39.**
- NYG – Isaiah Likely 17-yard pass from Jameis Winston (Dominic Zvada kick), 7:20. Commanders 27–20. **Drive: 9 plays, 75 yards, 3:45.**
- NYG – Malik Nabers 17-yard pass from Jameis Winston (Dominic Zvada kick), 1:43. Tied 27–27. **Drive: 10 plays, 72 yards, 3:13.**

**Overtime**

- No scoring plays

**Top passers**

- NYG – Jameis Winston – 33/54, 326 yards, 3 TD
- WSH – Jayden Daniels – 17/25, 199 yards

**Top rushers**

- NYG – Cam Skattebo – 13 rushes, 59 yards
- WSH – Jayden Daniels – 9 rushes, 103 yards, 2 TD

**Top receivers**

- NYG – Malik Nabers – 11 receptions, 121 yards
- WSH – Terry McLaurin – 4 receptions, 62 yards

This marked the Giants' first tie game since 2022, which was also against the Commanders, and snapped their four-game losing streak to Washington.

The Giants surrendered an opening drive touchdown run to Jacory Croskey-Merritt and could only respond with a field goal in the first half. Kicker Dominic Zvada went 1/3 in field goal attempts in the first half in the wind and rain. The Giants run defense didn't improve, allowing two touchdown scrambles by Commanders QB Jayden Daniels in his return from injury. However, the Giants offense got hot in the second half with quick passes and timely conversions. Isaiah Likely had two touchdowns, including his second on 4th & 7 to cut the game to one score. The Giants defense finally made a stop, and Jameis Winston led the offense on a game-tying drive, connecting with Malik Nabers for the game's final score.

The Giants got the ball to start overtime, but Zvada missed his third field goal of the game. The Commanders couldn't move the ball and punted back to the Giants, who moved down the field in a position to win the game. At the 2-minute warning after the Commanders used both of their timeouts, the Giants opted to run three plays to make it a shorter field goal for Zvada and run down the clock in case he missed to ensure a tie. However, Cam Skattebo fumbled on the first play after the warning and the Commanders took over, promptly moving down the field with three chunk plays. The Commanders had 2nd & 8 at the NYG-24 with 55 seconds left in overtime and let the clock run down to 12 seconds. Inexplicably, Daniels didn't spike the ball or throw it out of bounds and was tackled by Tremaine Edmunds for a sack on a broken play. The Commanders couldn't stop the clock and the game ended in a shocking 27–27 tie. The Giants defense celebrated as if they had won the game.

Both Daniels and Commanders head coach Dan Quinn were heavily criticized following the tie, with many fans and analysts calling for Quinn's firing.

With the tie, the Giants moved to 3–1–1 and secured a 1.5 game lead in the NFC East.

==== Week 6: vs. New Orleans Saints ====
Week 6: New Orleans Saints at New York Giants – Game summary

Quarter	1	2	3	4	Total
**Saints**	0	10	17	7	**34**
Giants	7	3	0	17	**27**

at MetLife Stadium, East Rutherford, New Jersey

- Date: October 18
- Game time: 1:00 p.m. EDT
- Game weather: Fair, 56 °F (13 °C)
- Game attendance: 82,905
- Referee: Alex Kemp
- TV announcers (Fox): Adam Amin, Drew Brees and Kristina Pink
- Recap, Game Book

Game information

**First quarter**

- NYG – Tyrone Tracy Jr. 17-yard pass from Jameis Winston (Dominic Zvada kick), 5:14. Giants 7–0. **Drive: 12 plays 93 yards, 6:44.**

**Second quarter**

- NYG – Dominic Zvada 34-yard field goal, 2:27. Giants 10–0. **Drive: 10 plays, 39 yards, 4:24.**
- NO – Daniel Carlson 58-yard field goal, 1:18. Giants 10–3. **Drive: 7 plays, 16 yards, 1:07.'**
- NO – Bryce Lance 2-yard pass from Tyler Shough (Daniel Carlson kick), 0:01. Tied 10–10. **Drive: 5 plays, 28 yards, 1:10.**

**Third quarter**

- NO – Alvin Kamara 31-yard pass from Tyler Shough (Daniel Carlson kick), 12:21. Saints 17–10. **Drive: 5 plays, 79 yards, 2:39.**
- NO – Tyler Shough 1-yard rush (Daniel Carlson kick), 5:43. Saints 24–10. **Drive: 9 plays, 52 yards, 4:49.'**
- NO – Daniel Carlson 51-yard field goal, 1:12. Saints 27–10. **Drive: 6 plays, 30 yards, 3:04.'**

**Fourth quarter**

- NO – Chris Olave 18-yard pass from Tyler Shough (Daniel Carlson kick), 11:31. Saints 34–10. **Drive: 2 plays, 21 yards, 0:48.**
- NYG – Tyrone Tracy Jr. 5-yard run (J. J. McCarthy–Isaiah Likely), 7:00. Saints 34–18. **Drive: 6 plays, 52 yards, 2:31.**
- NYG – Isaiah Likely 24-yard pass from J. J. McCarthy (pass failed), 5:06. Saints 34–24. **Drive: 3 plays, 73 yards, 0:48.**
- NYG – Dominic Zvada 41-yard field goal, 2:04. Saints 34–27. **Drive: plays, 69 yards, 1:55.**

**Top passers**

- NO – Tyler Shough – 16/30, 144 yards, 3 TD
- NYG – J. J. McCarthy – 11/21, 243 yards, TD, INT

**Top rushers**

- NO – Kendre Miller – 20 rushes, 70 yards
- NYG – J. J. McCarthy – 2 rushes, 26 yards

**Top receivers**

- NO – Chris Olave – 4 receptions, 43 yards, TD
- NYG – Malik Nabers – 12 receptions, 165 yards

Despite holding a 10–0 lead late in the first half, a critical special teams turnover by the Giants proved to be the major turning point in this game. Right after the Saints got on the board with a field goal, returner Charlie Jones fumbled the ensuing kickoff which gave the ball right back to the Saints and led to them tying the game on a 4th and goal touchdown just seconds before halftime. The Saints went on to score 34 consecutive points until early in the fourth quarter, when Jameis Winston was benched for J. J. McCarthy.

Although he threw an interception on his first drive after replacing Winston, McCarthy led the Giants to a near-comeback by throwing for 243 yards in 11 minutes, which set an NFL record for the most passing yards in an 11-minute span. After pulling the score to 34–27, the Giants were on the Saints' 14-yard line on 4th and 1 with 12 seconds left in the game, but McCarthy threw a pass to Isaiah Likely that fell incomplete. Likely appeared to be held/interfered with, but no penalty was called, sealing the game.

This marked the Giants' fourth straight loss to the Saints dating back to 2023.

==== Week 7: at Houston Texans ====
Week 7: New York Giants at Houston Texans – Game summary

Quarter	1	2	3	4	OT	Total
**Giants**	7	7	0	7	6	**27**
Texans	3	11	0	7	0	**21**

at Reliant Stadium, Houston, Texas

- Date: October 25
- Game time: 1:00 p.m. EDT/12:00 p.m. CDT
- Game weather: None (retractable roof closed)
- Game attendance: 71,052
- Referee: Land Clark
- TV announcers (Fox): Adam Amin, Drew Brees and Kristina Pink
- Recap, Game Book

Game information

**First quarter**

- HOU – Ka'imi Fairbairn 58-yard field goal, 11:40. Texans 3–0. **Drive: 6 plays, 25 yards, 3:20.**
- NYG – Tyrone Tracy Jr. 2-yard run (Dominic Zvada kick), 6:26. Giants 7–3. **Drive: 9 plays, 66 yards, 5:14.**

**Second quarter**

- HOU – Ka'imi Fairbairn 57-yard field goal, 9:03. Giants 7–6. **Drive: 7 plays, 39 yards, 3:36.**
- NYG – Jameis Winston 1-yard run (Dominic Zvada kick), 3:32. Giants 14–6. **Drive: 9 plays, 78 yards, 5:31.**
- HOU – Marvin Harrison Jr. 6-yard pass from C. J. Stroud (C. J. Stroud–Cade Stover pass), 0:34. Tied 14–14. **Drive: 8 plays, 90 yards, 2:58.**

**Third quarter**

- No scoring plays

**Fourth quarter**

- NYG – Cam Skattebo 16-yard run (Dominic Zvada kick), 8:55. Giants 21–14. **Drive: 14 plays, 80 yards, 8:18.**
- HOU – Xavier Hutchinson 3-yard pass from C. J. Stroud (Ka'imi Fairbairn kick), 0:52. Tied 21–21. **Drive: 9 plays, 48 yards, 4:14.**

**Overtime**

- NYG – Devin Singletary 30-yard run, 7:25. Giants 27–21. **Drive: 3 plays, 81 yards, 1:29.**

**Top passers**

- NYG – J. J. McCarthy – 20/28, 252 yards
- HOU – C. J. Stroud – 17/28, 153 yards, 2 TD

**Top rushers**

- NYG – Cam Skattebo – 17 rushes, 124 yards, TD
- HOU – Woody Marks – 17 rushes, 66 yards

**Top receivers**

- NYG – Malik Nabers – 7 receptions, 111 yards
- HOU – Dalton Schultz – 5 receptions, 45 yards

J. J. McCarthy made his first start as a Giant following a surprising fourth quarter performance the previous week. After having a stale run game for most of the season, the Giants rushing attack broke through in this game, with all four of the team's touchdowns coming on the ground.

Late in the second quarter after the Giants had scored their first two touchdowns, C.J. Stroud connected with his college teammate Marvin Harrison Jr. for their first touchdown as a duo, and the game was tied 14–14 at the half due to Giants kicker Dominic Zvada missing his second field goal of the game as the clock expired. After a quiet third quarter, Cam Skattebo broke through for the Giants. He broke three tackles on a 16-yard touchdown run to give the Giants a 21–14 lead, then Stroud responded with a game-tying drive, connecting with Xavier Hutchinson with 52 seconds remaining.

The Texans got the ball first in overtime and went 3-and-out. The Giants then got the ball and on the second play of their possession, Skattebo broke free for a 42-yard run, the longest of his career. Then on the very next play, former Texan Devin Singletary scored on a 30-yard scamper and won the game for the Giants 27–21. The Giants went into the bye at 4–2–1.

McCarthy finished 20/28 for 252 passing yards and no turnovers. Malik Nabers had another strong game and was named the NFC Offensive Player of the Month of October. He finished the contest with 7 catches for 111 yards, his fourth straight 100-yard game. Skattebo had a career high 124 rushing yards, and four different Giants had a rushing touchdown in a single game for the first time since 1950.

==== Week 9: at Philadelphia Eagles ====
Week 9: New York Giants at Philadelphia Eagles – Game summary

Quarter	1	2	3	4	Total
**Giants**	6	0	7	6	**19**
Eagles	8	0	0	3	**11**

at Lincoln Financial Field, Philadelphia, Pennsylvania

- Date: November 8
- Game time: 1:00 p.m. EST
- Game weather: Sunny, 57 °F (14 °C)
- Game attendance: 69,879
- Referee: Bill Vinovich
- TV announcers (Fox): Joe Davis, Greg Olsen and Pam Oliver
- Recap, Game Book

Game information

**First quarter**

- NYG – Dominic Zvada 53-yard field goal, 10:30. Giants 3–0. **Drive: 10 plays, 46 yards, 4:30.**
- NYG – Dominic Zvada 49-yard field goal, 5:31. Giants 6–0. **Drive: 7 plays, 23 yards, 3:29.**
- PHI – Saquon Barkley 3-yard run (Joe Milton III run), 2:09. Eagles 8–6. **Drive: 8 plays, 58 yards, 3:22.**

**Second quarter**

- No scoring plays

**Third quarter**

- NYG – Isaiah Likely 5-yard pass from Jameis Winston (Dominic Zvada kick), 2:25. Giants 13–8. **Drive: 14 plays, 76 yards, 7:56.**

**Fourth quarter**

- NYG – Dominic Zvada 38-yard field goal, 9:06. Giants 16–8. **Drive: 13 plays, 54 yards, 6:11.**
- NYG – Dominic Zvada 49-yard field goal, 4:24. Giants 19–8. **Drive: 4 plays, 4 yards, 2:19.**
- PHI – Jake Elliott 45-yard field goal, 1:56. Giants 19–11. **Drive: 10 plays, 48 yards, 2:28.**

**Top passers**

- NYG – J. J. McCarthy – 12/19, 127 yards
- PHI – Joe Milton III – 18/34, 169 yards

**Top rushers**

- NYG – Devin Singletary – 21 rushes, 31 yards
- PHI – Joe Milton III – 9 rushes, 64 yards

**Top receivers**

- NYG – Darnell Mooney – 3 receptions, 54 yards
- PHI – Makai Lemon – 6 receptions, 61 yards

In a defensive battle throughout the afternoon, Arvell Reese had a dominant performance, finishing with 12 tackles, 3 sacks, and a forced fumble, highlighted by a violent strip sack of Eagles QB Joe Milton in the second quarter. Dominic Zvada rebounded from his earlier struggles and made all four field goal attempts at critical moments in the game. In the third quarter, Jameis Winston briefly came on in relief of J. J. McCarthy after he got injured by a hard hit from Zack Baun on a designed QB run. Surprisingly, Winston only played for one drive and led the Giants down the field for their only touchdown of the day when he hit Isaiah Likely to give the Giants the lead they would not relinquish.

With the win, the Giants defeated the Eagles on the road for the first time since 2013, snapping a 13-game road losing streak against Philadelphia (including their 2022 playoff loss).

==== Week 10: vs. Washington Commanders ====
Week 10: Washington Commanders at New York Giants – Game summary

Quarter	1	2	3	4	Total
**Commanders**	0	10	7	7	**24**
Giants	0	7	7	7	**21**

at MetLife Stadium, East Rutherford, New Jersey

- Date: November 12
- Game time: 8:15 p.m. EST
- Game weather: Light rain, 48 °F (9 °C)
- Game attendance: 80,450
- Referee: Brad Rogers
- TV announcers (Prime Video): Al Michaels, Kirk Herbstreit and Kaylee Hartung
  Game exclusive to WTTG and WNYW.
- Recap, Game Book

Game information

**First quarter**

- No scoring plays

**Second quarter**

- WSH – Drew Stevens 46-yard field goal, 14:07. Commanders 3–0. **Drive: 11 plays, 49 yards, 4:57.**
- NYG – Cam Skattebo 1-yard run (Dominic Zvada kick), 2:35. Giants 7–3. **Drive: 16 plays, 72 yards, 7:48.**
- WSH – Ben Sinnott 1-yard pass from Jayden Daniels (Drew Stevens kick), 0:05. Commanders 10–7. **Drive: 9 plays, 67 yards, 2:30.**

**Third quarter**

- NYG – Cam Skattebo 13-yard run (Dominic Zvada kick), 10:22. Giants 14–10. **Drive: 5 plays, 55 yards, 2:02.**
- WSH – Antonio Williams 31-yard pass from Jayden Daniels (Drew Stevens kick), 6:56. Commanders 17–14. **Drive: 6 plays, 77 yards, 3:26.**

**Fourth quarter**

- NYG – Isaiah Likely 66-yard pass from J. J. McCarthy (Dominic Zvada kick), 8:13. Giants 21–17. **Drive: 3 plays, 69 yards, 0:51.**
- WSH – Stefon Diggs 32-yard pass from Jayden Daniels (Drew Stevens kick), 0:57. Commanders 24–21. **Drive: 3 plays, 71 yards, 0:49.**

**Top passers**

- WSH – Jayden Daniels – 23/33, 249 yards, 3 TD, 2 INT
- NYG – J. J. McCarthy – 23/36, 293 yards, TD, INT

**Top rushers**

- WSH – Rachaad White – 11 rushes, 47 yards
- NYG – Cam Skattebo – 18 rushes, 78 yards, 2 TD

**Top receivers**

- WSH – Stefon Diggs – 6 receptions, 83 yards, TD
- NYG – Isaiah Likely – 9 receptions, 127 yards, TD

Although Cam Skattebo scored two touchdowns after missing the previous game with a hamstring injury, several mishaps would ultimately cost the Giants the game. Dominic Zvada missed a 33-yard field goal attempt early on, which proved to be the difference in the final score, and in the second half, Malik Nabers fumbled when the Giants were in the red zone, taking more points off the board.

Defensively, the Giants intercepted Jayden Daniels twice in the fourth quarter after a 66-yard touchdown catch by Isaiah Likely gave them a 21–17 lead, but the Giants failed to convert either of these takeaways into points. This gave the Commanders new life, as Daniels threw a go-ahead 32-yard touchdown pass to Stefon Diggs with just under a minute left after several missed tackles. Down 24–21, the Giants were in Washington territory with a chance to potentially tie the game with a field goal or win with a touchdown, but with 30 seconds left, J. J. McCarthy was intercepted by Rasul Douglas while targeting Nabers downfield, sealing the heartbreaking loss.

The Giants fell to 5–3–1 and failed to beat Washington for the sixth straight game, having last done so in Week 11 of 2023.

==== Week 11: vs. Jacksonville Jaguars ====
Week 11: Jacksonville Jaguars at New York Giants – Game summary

Quarter	1	2	3	4	Total
Jaguars	0	0	0	0	**0**
Giants	0	0	0	0	**0**

at MetLife Stadium, East Rutherford, New Jersey

- Date: November 22
- Game time: 4:25 p.m. EST
- Game weather: Mostly cloudy, 59 °F (15 °C)
- Referee: Craig Wrolstad
- TV announcers (CBS): Jim Nantz, J.J. Watt and Tracy Wolfson
- Preview

=== Standings ===
==== Division ====
NFC East
	W	L	T	PCT	DIV	CONF	PF	PA	STK
New York Giants	5	3	1	.611	2–1–1	3–3–1	203	196	L1
Dallas Cowboys	5	6	0	.455	2–1	2–5	337	312	W1
Washington Commanders	3	5	1	.389	2–2–1	3–4–1	196	223	W1
Philadelphia Eagles	3	7	0	.300	1–3	1–6	167	237	W1

==== Conference ====
NFC
Seed	Team	Division	W	L	T	PCT	DIV	CONF	SOS	SOV	STK
**Division leaders**
1	San Francisco 49ers	West	8	1	0	.889	3–0	5–1	.431	.448	W2
2 (Note: Detroit wins tie break over Minnesota and Chicago based on head-to-head record.)	Detroit Lions	North	7	2	0	.778	2–0	4–1	.459	.403	W5
3	New York Giants	East	5	3	1	.611	2–1–1	3–3–1	.353	.292	L1
4	Carolina Panthers	South	4	5	0	.444	2–1	4–3	.524	.405	W1
**Wild cards**
5 (Note: Minnesota wins tie break over Chicago based on head-to-head victory.)	Minnesota Vikings	North	7	2	0	.778	3–1	5–1	.518	.433	W1
6	Chicago Bears	North	7	2	0	.778	0–2	5–2	.442	.373	W4
7 (Note: Green Bay wins tie break over Seattle based on conference record. Division tie break was initially used to eliminate LA Rams (see below).)	Green Bay Packers	North	6	4	0	.600	1–3	4–4	.521	.439	L1
**In the hunt**
8 (Note: Seattle wins tie break over LA Rams based on division record.)	Seattle Seahawks	West	6	4	0	.600	2–1	2–3	.516	.397	W2
9	Los Angeles Rams	West	6	4	0	.600	1–2	4–2	.484	.339	W4
10	Dallas Cowboys	East	4	6	0	.400	2–1	2–5	.438	.321	L1
11	Washington Commanders	East	3	5	1	.389	2–2–1	3–4–1	.488	.482	W1
12 (Note: Tampa Bay wins tie break over New Orleans based on division record.)	Tampa Bay Buccaneers	South	3	6	0	.333	2–0	3–3	.588	.379	L1
13	New Orleans Saints	South	3	6	0	.333	0–2	1–4	.547	.534	L1
14 (Note: Atlanta wins tie break over Arizona based on conference record.)	Atlanta Falcons	South	3	7	0	.300	1–2	3–3	.598	.607	L3
15	Arizona Cardinals	West	3	7	0	.300	1–4	2–6	.595	.379	L2
16	Philadelphia Eagles	East	2	7	0	.222	1–3	1–6	.500	.250	L7
