= List of New York Giants first-round draft picks =

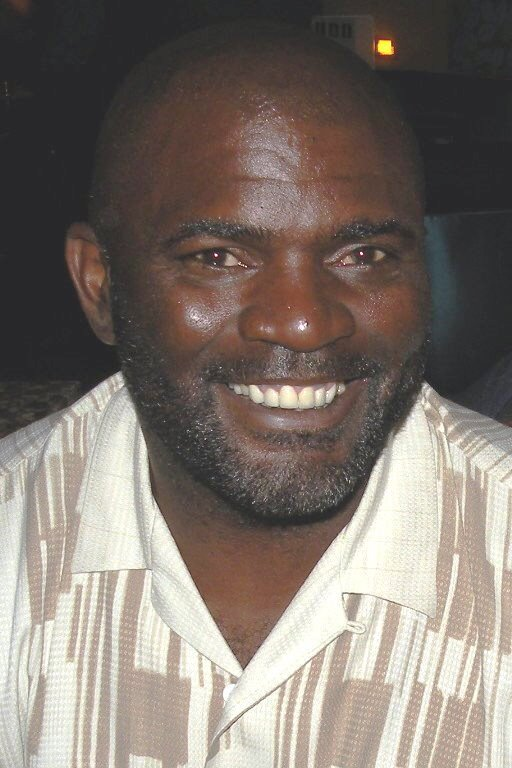
Lawrence Taylor is one of three Giants first-round draft picks to be voted into the Pro Football Hall of Fame.

The New York Giants are a National Football League (NFL) franchise founded in the 1925 season, the NFL's sixth. Eleven years later, the league introduced the NFL Draft after team owners voted on it in 1935. The intention of the draft was to make the NFL more competitive, as a few stronger teams, including the Giants, had an advantage in signing young players because they were able to offer higher salaries and an opportunity to compete for championships. Since that first draft, the Giants have selected 88 players in the first round. The team's first-round pick in the inaugural NFL Draft was Art Lewis, a tackle from Ohio University; he was the 9th overall selection. In the most recent draft, held in 2026, the Giants chose Ohio State linebacker Arvell Reese and University of Miami offensive tackle Francis Mauigoa.

Officially known as the "NFL Annual Player Selection Meeting", but more often called the NFL Draft, the event is the NFL's primary mechanism for distributing newly professional players finished with their college football careers to its teams. The draft order is determined based on the previous season's standings; the teams with the worst win–loss records receive the earliest picks. Teams that qualified for the NFL playoffs select after non-qualifiers, and their order depends on how far they advanced. The final two selections in the first round are reserved for the Super Bowl runner-up and champion. Draft picks are tradable, and players or other picks can be acquired with them.

Of the 88 players drafted by the Giants in the first round, 27 played at one of the running back positions. Of these, 10 were halfbacks and six were fullbacks, and the remaining 11 are credited as backs, blocking backs, or running backs. Among other frequently drafted positions, the Giants have chosen 11 offensive tackles, eight defensive backs, eight defensive ends, seven wide receivers, six quarterbacks, five defensive tackles, and five linebackers. The Giants have selected five first-round picks who have attended the University of Notre Dame and the University of Miami, more than any other school. Ohio State has had the third-most with four players selected. The Giants have held the first overall pick twice, in 1951 and 1965, selecting Kyle Rote and Tucker Frederickson. Three of the team's first-round picks—George Connor, Frank Gifford, and Lawrence Taylor—have been elected to the Pro Football Hall of Fame.

The Giants did not draft a player in the first round on 11 occasions. Two of those picks, for the 1967 and 1968 drafts, were traded to the Minnesota Vikings in 1967 as part of a deal for quarterback Fran Tarkenton. During the 1974 season, the Giants dealt their 1975 first-round choice to the Dallas Cowboys for another quarterback, Craig Morton. In another case when the Giants used first-round draft picks to trade for a quarterback, the team acquired 2004 first overall pick Eli Manning from the San Diego Chargers, in a deal that included their 2004 and 2005 first-round picks; the Giants had already selected Philip Rivers with the 2004 pick, the fourth in that year's draft. The Giants used multiple first-round selections in 1951, 1972, 1984, 2019, 2022, 2025, and 2026; in the second instance; they gained a selection by trading Tarkenton back to the Vikings.

== Key ==
Table key
| B | Back | K | Kicker | NT | Nose tackle |
| C | Center | LB | Linebacker | FB | Fullback |
| DB | Defensive back | P | Punter | HB | Halfback |
| DE | Defensive end | QB | Quarterback | WR | Wide receiver |
| DT | Defensive tackle | RB | Running back | G | Guard |
| E | End | T | Offensive tackle | TE | Tight end |
| ^ | Indicates the player was inducted into the Pro Football Hall of Fame. | | | | |
| — | The Giants did not draft a player in the first round that year. | | | | |
| Year | Each year links to an article about that particular NFL Draft. | | | | |
| Pick | Indicates the number of the pick within the first round | | | | |
| Position | Indicates the position of the player in the NFL | | | | |
| College | The player's college football team | | | | |

== Player selections ==
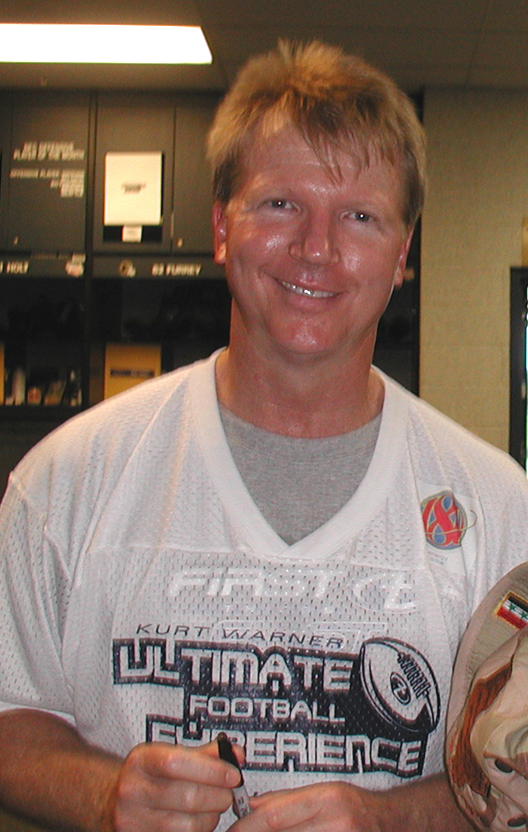
Phil Simms was the Giants' first-round pick in 1979.

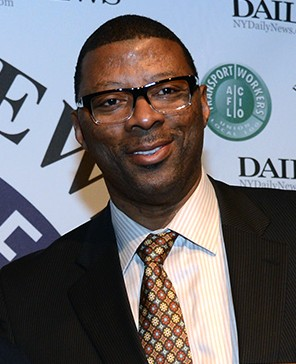
Carl Banks was one of the Giants' first-round picks in 1984.

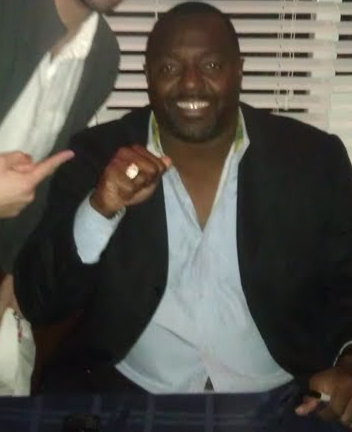
Rodney Hampton was the Giants' first-round pick in 1990.

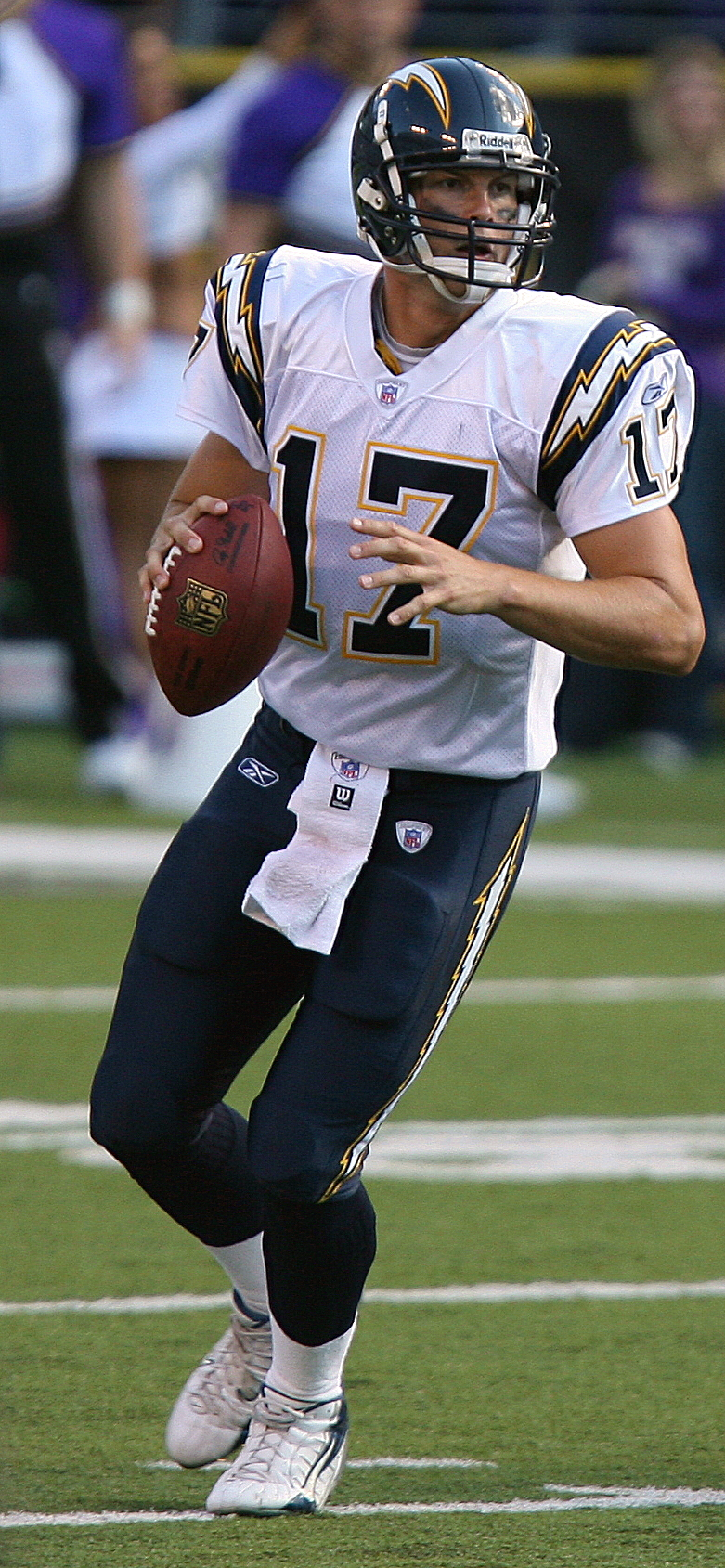
Philip Rivers, who was traded by the Giants to the San Diego Chargers after they selected him fourth overall in 2004.

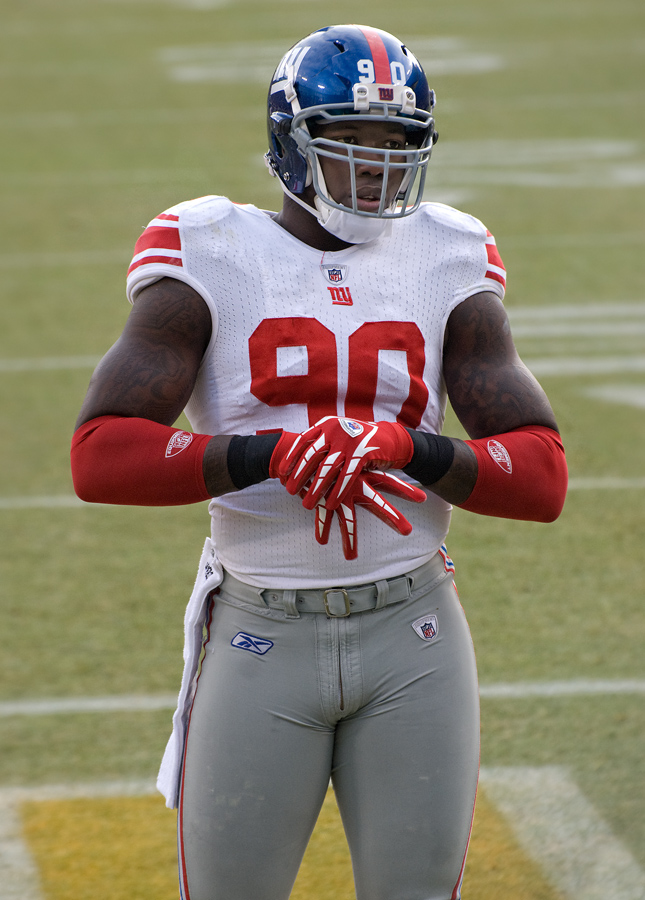
Jason Pierre-Paul was the Giants' first-round pick in 2010.

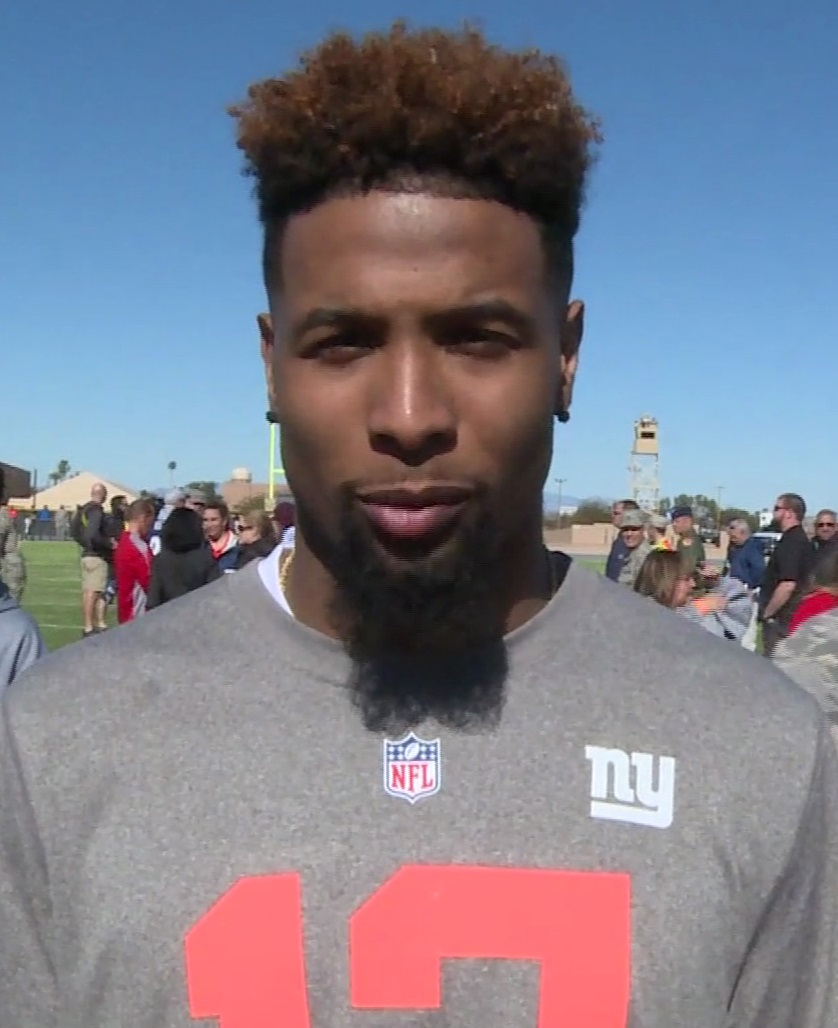
Odell Beckham Jr. was selected by the Giants with the 12th overall pick in 2014.

New York Giants first-round draft picks
| Year | Pick | Player name | Position | College | Notes |
|---|---|---|---|---|---|
| 1936 | 9 | Art Lewis | Tackle | Ohio | |
| 1937 | 4 | Ed Widseth | Tackle | Minnesota | |
| 1938 | 8 | George Karamatic | Fullback | Gonzaga | |
| 1939 | 10 | Walt Nielsen | Fullback | Arizona | |
| 1940 | 10 | Grenny Lansdell | Halfback | USC | |
| 1941 | 6 | George Franck | Halfback | Minnesota | |
| 1942 | 8 | Merle Hapes | Fullback | Ole Miss | |
| 1943 | 6 | Steve Filipowicz | Fullback | Fordham | |
| 1944 | 6 | Billy Hillenbrand | Halfback | Indiana | |
| 1945 | 10 | Elmer Barbour | Blocking back | Wake Forest | |
| 1946 | 5 | George Connor ^{^} | Tackle | Notre Dame | |
| 1947 | 10 | Vic Schwall | Halfback | Northwestern | |
| 1948 | 2 | Skip Minisi | Halfback | Pennsylvania | |
| 1949 | 4 | Paul Page | Halfback | SMU | |
| 1950 | 7 | Travis Tidwell | Quarterback | Auburn | |
| 1951 | 1 | Kyle Rote | End | SMU | ^{[a]} |
| 1951 | 13 | Jim Spavital | Fullback | Oklahoma State | ^{[b]} |
| 1952 | 11 | Frank Gifford ^{^} | Halfback | USC | |
| 1953 | 8 | Bobby Marlow | Back | Alabama | |
| 1954 | — | — | — | — | ^{[c]} |
| 1955 | 8 | Joe Heap | Halfback | Notre Dame | |
| 1956 | — | — | — | — | ^{[d]} |
| 1957 | — | — | — | — | ^{[e]} |
| 1958 | 12 | Phil King | Halfback | Vanderbilt | |
| 1959 | 10 | Lee Grosscup | Quarterback | Utah | |
| 1960 | 12 | Lou Cordileone | Defensive tackle | Clemson | |
| 1961 | — | — | — | — | ^{[f]} |
| 1962 | 13 | Jerry Hillebrand | Linebacker | Colorado | ^{[g]} |
| 1963 | — | — | — | — | ^{[h]} |
| 1964 | 12 | Joe Don Looney | Halfback | Oklahoma | |
| 1965 | 1 | Tucker Frederickson | Running back | Auburn | |
| 1966 | 10 | Francis Peay | Tackle | Missouri | |
| 1967 | — | — | — | — | ^{[i]} |
| 1968 | — | — | — | — | ^{[i]} |
| 1969 | 13 | Fred Dryer | Defensive end | San Diego State | |
| 1970 | 13 | Jim Files | Linebacker | Oklahoma | |
| 1971 | 18 | Rocky Thompson | Running back | West Texas A&M | |
| 1972 | 17 | Eldridge Small | Defensive back | Texas A&M–Kingsville | |
| 1972 | 24 | Larry Jacobson | Defensive tackle | Nebraska | ^{[j]} |
| 1973 | — | — | — | — | ^{[k]} |
| 1974 | 3 | John Hicks | Guard | Ohio State | |
| 1975 | — | — | — | — | ^{[l]} |
| 1976 | 13 | Troy Archer | Defensive tackle | Colorado | |
| 1977 | 5 | Gary Jeter | Defensive end | USC | |
| 1978 | 10 | Gordon King | Tackle | Stanford | |
| 1979 | 7 | Phil Simms | Quarterback | Morehead State | |
| 1980 | 8 | Mark Haynes | Defensive back | Colorado | |
| 1981 | 2 | Lawrence Taylor ^{^} | Linebacker | North Carolina | |
| 1982 | 18 | Butch Woolfolk | Running back | Michigan | |
| 1983 | 10 | Terry Kinard | Defensive back | Clemson | |
| 1984 | 3 | Carl Banks | Linebacker | Michigan State | |
| 1984 | 27 | William Roberts | Guard | Ohio State | ^{[m]} |
| 1985 | 19 | George Adams | Running back | Kentucky | |
| 1986 | 19 | Eric Dorsey | Defensive end | Notre Dame | |
| 1987 | 28 | Mark Ingram | Wide receiver | Michigan State | |
| 1988 | 10 | Eric Moore | Guard | Indiana | |
| 1989 | 18 | Brian Williams | Center | Minnesota | |
| 1990 | 24 | Rodney Hampton | Running back | Georgia | |
| 1991 | 27 | Jarrod Bunch | Fullback | Michigan | |
| 1992 | 14 | Derek Brown | Tight end | Notre Dame | |
| 1993 | — | — | — | — | ^{[n]} |
| 1994 | 24 | Thomas Lewis | Wide receiver | Indiana | |
| 1995 | 17 | Tyrone Wheatley | Running back | Michigan | |
| 1996 | 5 | Cedric Jones | Defensive end | Oklahoma | |
| 1997 | 7 | Ike Hilliard | Wide receiver | Florida | |
| 1998 | 24 | Shaun Williams | Defensive back | UCLA | |
| 1999 | 19 | Luke Petitgout | Tackle | Notre Dame | |
| 2000 | 11 | Ron Dayne | Running back | Wisconsin | |
| 2001 | 22 | Will Allen | Defensive back | Syracuse | ^{[o]} |
| 2002 | 14 | Jeremy Shockey | Tight end | Miami (Florida) | ^{[p]} |
| 2003 | 25 | William Joseph | Defensive tackle | Miami (Florida) | |
| 2004 | 4 | Philip Rivers | Quarterback | NC State | ^{[q]} |
| 2005 | — | — | — | — | ^{[q]} |
| 2006 | 32 | Mathias Kiwanuka | Defensive end | Boston College | ^{[r]} |
| 2007 | 20 | Aaron Ross | Defensive back | Texas | |
| 2008 | 31 | Kenny Phillips | Defensive back | Miami (Florida) | |
| 2009 | 29 | Hakeem Nicks | Wide receiver | North Carolina | |
| 2010 | 15 | Jason Pierre-Paul | Defensive end | South Florida | |
| 2011 | 19 | Prince Amukamara | Defensive back | Nebraska | |
| 2012 | 32 | David Wilson | Running back | Virginia Tech | |
| 2013 | 19 | Justin Pugh | Tackle | Syracuse | |
| 2014 | 12 | Odell Beckham Jr. | Wide receiver | LSU | |
| 2015 | 9 | Ereck Flowers | Tackle | Miami (Florida) | |
| 2016 | 10 | Eli Apple | Cornerback | Ohio State | |
| 2017 | 23 | Evan Engram | Tight end | Mississippi | |
| 2018 | 2 | Saquon Barkley | Running back | Penn State | |
| 2019 | 6 | Daniel Jones | Quarterback | Duke | |
| 2019 | 17 | Dexter Lawrence | Defensive tackle | Clemson | ^{[s]} |
| 2019 | 30 | Deandre Baker | Cornerback | Georgia | ^{[t]} |
| 2020 | 4 | Andrew Thomas | Tackle | Georgia | |
| 2021 | 20 | Kadarius Toney | Wide receiver | Florida | ^{[u]} |
| 2022 | 5 | Kayvon Thibodeaux | Defensive end | Oregon | |
| 2022 | 7 | Evan Neal | Tackle | Alabama | ^{[w]} |
| 2023 | 24 | Deonte Banks | Cornerback | Maryland | ^{[x]} |
| 2024 | 6 | Malik Nabers | Wide receiver | LSU | |
| 2025 | 3 | Abdul Carter | Defensive end | Penn State | |
| 2025 | 25 | Jaxson Dart | Quarterback | Ole Miss | ^{[y]} |
| 2026 | 5 | Arvell Reese | Linebacker | Ohio State | |
| 2026 | 10 | Francis Mauigoa | Offensive tackle | Miami (Florida) | ^{[z]} |

== Notes ==
- ^{a} From 1947 to 1958, the NFL held an annual lottery that decided which team would select first overall in the draft with a "bonus pick". The Giants won the bonus lottery in 1951, giving them the first choice in that year's draft.
- ^{b} The 1951 draft was the second in which Spavital was selected. The Chicago Cardinals had chosen him in the first round of the 1948 draft. Spavital was one of 28 Baltimore Colts players who became eligible for the 1951 draft when that franchise became defunct.
- ^{c} The Giants traded their 1954 first-round draft pick to the Green Bay Packers.
- ^{d} The Giants traded their 1956 first-round draft pick to the Los Angeles Rams.
- ^{e} In 1956, the Giants traded their 1957 first-round draft pick to the Rams in exchange for defensive end Andy Robustelli.
- ^{f} In 1959, the Giants traded their 1961 first-round draft pick to the Baltimore Colts in exchange for quarterback George Shaw. The Colts later traded the selection to the San Francisco 49ers for end Dee Mackey.
- ^{g} In 1961, the Giants acquired a second 1962 first-round draft pick from the Minnesota Vikings in exchange for George Shaw, then traded the selection to the Rams for wide receiver Del Shofner.
- ^{h} In 1962, the Giants traded their 1963 first-round draft pick to the St. Louis Cardinals, along with Bill Triplett, in exchange for quarterback Ralph Guglielmi.
- ^{i1} ^{i2} The Giants were awarded the first overall pick in 1967 or 1968 as compensation for the New York Jets joining the NFL as part of the league's merger with the American Football League. The choice was conditional upon the Giants selecting a quarterback; the team was allowed to trade the pick, if they received a starting quarterback in return. In 1967, the Giants traded their 1967 and 1968 first-round draft picks, their 1967 second-round pick, and a player to be named later to the Vikings in exchange for quarterback Fran Tarkenton. The New Orleans Saints were ultimately given the first overall pick in 1967 (before trading it to the Colts), dropping the Giants' former selection to second.
- ^{j} In 1971, the Giants traded their original 1972 first-round draft pick to the Chicago Bears in exchange for center Bob Hyland and cornerback Bennie McRae. This pick was acquired from the Vikings, along with running back Vince Clements, center Bob Grim, quarterback Norm Snead, and a second-round pick in the 1973 draft, in exchange for Tarkenton.
- ^{k} In 1972, the Giants traded their 1973 first- and second-round draft picks to the Cleveland Browns in exchange for defensive end Jack Gregory and defensive back Freddie Summers.
- ^{l} In 1974, the Giants traded their 1975 first-round draft pick to the Dallas Cowboys in exchange for quarterback Craig Morton.
- ^{m} This pick was acquired from the Washington Redskins in exchange for second- and fifth-round draft picks.
- ^{n} The Giants selected quarterback Dave Brown in the first round of the 1992 supplemental draft, and as a result forfeited their 1993 first-round draft pick.
- ^{o} During the 2001 draft, the Giants acquired this pick from the Indianapolis Colts in exchange for their original first-round selection (30th in the draft) and picks in rounds three and six.
- ^{p} During the 2002 draft, the Giants acquired this pick from the Tennessee Titans in exchange for their original first-round selection (15th in the draft) and a fourth-round pick.
- ^{q1} ^{q2} After drafting Rivers, the Giants traded him to the San Diego Chargers, along with their 2004 third-round pick and 2005 first- and fifth-round choice, in exchange for quarterback Eli Manning, the first overall pick.
- ^{r} During the 2006 draft, the Giants acquired this pick from the Pittsburgh Steelers, along with third- and fourth-round selections, in exchange for their original first-round choice (25th in the draft).
- ^{s} This pick was acquired from the Browns, along with safety Jabrill Peppers and a third-round draft pick, in exchange for wide receiver Odell Beckham Jr.
- ^{t} During the 2019 draft, the Giants acquired this pick from the Seattle Seahawks in exchange for three draft picks.
- ^{u} During the 2021 draft, the Giants acquired this pick from the Bears, along with a fifth-round selection and 2022 first- and fourth-round picks, in exchange for their original first-round choice (11th in the draft).
- ^{w} This pick was acquired from the Bears in the teams' 2021 trade.
- ^{x} During the 2023 draft, the Giants acquired this pick from the Jacksonville Jaguars in exchange for their original first-round selection (25th in the draft) and fifth- and seventh-round picks.
- ^{y} During the 2025 draft, the Giants acquired this pick from the Houston Texans in exchange for their second- and third-round selections (34th and 99th overall) and a 2026 third-round selection.
- ^{z} This pick was acquired from the Cincinnati Bengals in exchange for defensive tackle Dexter Lawrence.
