= Arvell =

Arvell is a given name. Notable people with the name include:

- Arvell Jones, American comic book illustrator
- Arvell Nelson (born 1988), American football player
- Arvell Reese (born 2005), American football player
- Arvell Shaw (1923–2002), American jazz double-bassist
