= Arvell Reese =

American football player (born 2005)

No. 52 – New York Giants
- Position: Linebacker
- Roster status: Active

Personal information
- Born: August 30, 2005 (age 21); Cleveland, Ohio, U.S.
- Listed height: 6 ft 4 in (1.93 m)
- Listed weight: 243 lb (110 kg)

Career information
- High school: Glenville (Cleveland)
- College: Ohio State (2023–2025)
- NFL draft: 2026: 1st round, 5th overall pick

Career history
- New York Giants (2026–present)

Awards and highlights
- CFP national champion (2024); Consensus All-American (2025); Big Ten Linebacker of the Year (2025)

Career NFL statistics as of Week 10, 2026
- Tackles: 81
- Sacks: 4.5
- Forced fumbles: 1
- Fumble recoveries: 1
- Pass deflections: 4
- Interceptions: 1
- Stats at Pro Football Reference

Arvell Reese (born August 30, 2005) is an American professional football linebacker for the New York Giants of the National Football League (NFL). Reese played college football for the Ohio State Buckeyes, winning the 2025 national championship (for the 2024 season) before being selected fifth overall by the Giants in the 2026 NFL draft.

== Early life ==
Reese was born on August 30, 2005 in Cleveland, Ohio. He attended Glenville High School in Cleveland's Glenville neighborhood and was rated as a four-star recruit and committed to play college football for the Ohio State Buckeyes.

== College career ==
As a freshman in 2023, Reese only appeared in six games due to a concussion, recording no statistics. In the 2024 season opener, he notched four tackles with one being for a loss in a win over Akron. In week 9, Reese recorded two tackles but was ejected due to a questionable targeting call late in the fourth quarter against Nebraska. The call was later overturned on appeal, lifting Reese's suspension for the Buckeyes' matchup versus Penn State. As of the 2025 season, Reese has become a highly touted linebacker for the 2026 NFL Draft, and has become one of the best linebackers in the country. On January 8, 2026, Reese declared for the draft.

== Professional career ==
Pre-draft measurables
Height	Weight	Arm length	Hand span	Wingspan	40-yard dash	10-yard split	20-yard split
6 ft 4 1/8 in (1.93 m)	241 lb (109 kg)	32 1/2 in (0.83 m)	9 1/2 in (0.24 m)	6 ft 7 1/2 in (2.02 m)	4.46 s	1.58 s	2.64 s
All values from NFL Combine

Reese was selected by the New York Giants in the first round with the fifth overall pick of the 2026 NFL draft. On May 29, 2026, he signed a four-year, $47.8 million contract with the Giants that included a $31.2 million signing bonus.

During his rookie training camp, Reese received praise from Giants defensive coordinator Dennard Wilson and head coach John Harbaugh for his diligence, versatility, and ability to pick up defensive schemes quickly.

Reese started the season for the Giants, being slotted at the inside linebacker position within the Giants' front seven. In his professional debut in Week 1 against the rival Dallas Cowboys, Reese recorded 5 tackles, one tackle for loss, and a lone quarterback hit in the 28–20 win.

In Week 4 against the Arizona Cardinals, Reese recorded his first career interception off a pass deflected by teammate Shelby Harris. The following week against the division rival Washington Commanders, he recorded his first career sack on quarterback Jayden Daniels within the final seconds of regulation, helping send the game to overtime.

In Week 9 against the rival Philadelphia Eagles, Reese had a career performance, recording 12 total tackles (10 solo), three sacks, three tackles for loss, and a forced fumble. He became the youngest player in NFL history to record a three-sack game (21 years and 70 days old). Reese helped contribute to a dominant Giants defensive performance as his team won 19–11 and earned NFC Defensive Player of the Week.

== Career statistics ==
=== NFL ===
Year	Team	Games		Tackles					Fumbles				Interceptions			
Year	Team	GP	GS	Cmb	Solo	Ast	Sck	TFL	FF	FR	Yds	TD	Int	Yds	TD	PD
2026	NYG	9	9	81	53	28	4.5	8	1	1	0	0	1	8	0	4
Career		9	9	81	53	28	4.5	8	1	1	0	0	1	8	0	4

=== College ===
Year	Team	GP	Tackles					Fumbles				Interceptions			
Year	Team	GP	Cmb	Solo	Ast	TFL	Sck	FF	FR	Yds	TD	Int	Yds	TD	PD
2023	Ohio State	6	0	0	0	0.0	0.0	0	0	0	0	0	0	0	0
2024	Ohio State	16	43	18	25	3.5	0.5	0	0	0	0	0	0	0	0
2025	Ohio State	14	69	34	35	10.0	6.5	0	0	0	0	0	0	0	2
Career		36	112	52	60	13.5	7.0	0	0	0	0	0	0	0	2
