= Francisco Mauigoa =

American football player (born 2003)

Kiko Mauigoa
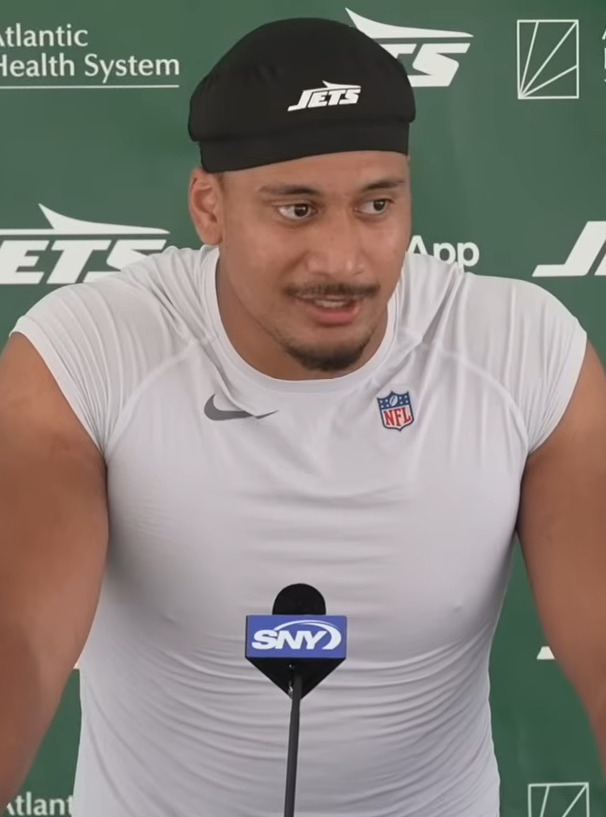
- Mauigoa with the New York Jets in 2025

No. 51 – New York Jets
- Position: Linebacker
- Roster status: Injured reserve

Personal information
- Born: March 17, 2003 (age 23) 'Ili'ili, American Samoa
- Listed height: 6 ft 2 in (1.88 m)
- Listed weight: 233 lb (106 kg)

Career information
- High school: Aquinas (San Bernardino, California, U.S.)
- College: Washington State (2021–2022); Miami (FL) (2023–2024)
- NFL draft: 2025: 5th round, 162nd overall pick

Career history
- New York Jets (2025–present)

Career NFL statistics as of 2025
- Tackles: 45
- Stats at Pro Football Reference

Francisco "Kiko" Mauigoa (born March 17, 2003) is an American professional football linebacker for the New York Jets of the National Football League (NFL). He played college football for the Washington State Cougars and Miami Hurricanes and was selected by the Jets in the fifth round of the 2025 NFL draft. He is the older brother of New York Giants tackle Francis Mauigoa.

== Early life ==
Mauigoa attended Aquinas High School. As a senior, he threw for 1,113 yards and 10 touchdowns while also rushing for 475 yards and four touchdowns. Mauigoa would also notch 46 tackles with five going for a loss and an interception. He committed to play college football for the Washington State Cougars as a linebacker.

== College career ==
=== Washington State ===
In Mauigoa's first career season in 2021, he totaled 17 tackles with half of a tackle being for a loss. In week 4 of the 2022 season versus Oregon, he returned an interception 95 yards for a touchdown. During the 2022 season, Mauigoa started in 11 games notching 60 tackles with five and a half going for a loss, three and a half sacks, an interception, and three forced fumbles. After the season, Mauigoa entered the NCAA transfer portal.

=== Miami ===
Mauigoa transferred to play for the Miami Hurricanes. In the 2023 season opener, he tallied a team-leading five tackles in a win over Miami (Ohio). In week 6, Mauigoa notched four tackles with one and a half going for a loss, and an interception against Georgia Tech. For his performance on the 2023 season he was named second-team all-ACC.

== Professional career ==
Pre-draft measurables
Height	Weight	Arm length	Hand span	Wingspan	40-yard dash	10-yard split	20-yard split	20-yard shuttle	Three-cone drill	Vertical jump	Broad jump	Bench press
6 ft 1 7/8 in (1.88 m)	233 lb (106 kg)	31 3/4 in (0.81 m)	10 1/4 in (0.26 m)	6 ft 5 3/8 in (1.97 m)	4.60 s	1.56 s	2.68 s	4.24 s	7.15 s	37.0 in (0.94 m)	10 ft 1 in (3.07 m)	21 reps
All values from NFL Combine/Pro Day

Mauigoa was selected by the New York Jets in the fifth round (162nd overall) of the 2025 NFL draft. The Jets acquired the 162nd overall pick from the Pittsburgh Steelers in the trade for Mike Williams. He played in 12 games (including eight starts following an injury to Quincy Williams) for New York during his rookie campaign, recording 45 tackles. On December 26, 2025, Mauigoa was placed on season-ending injured reserve due to a neck injury suffered in Week 14 against the Miami Dolphins.

== NFL career statistics ==
=== Regular season ===
Year	Team	Games		Tackles					Interceptions						Fumbles				
Year	Team	GP	GS	Cmb	Solo	Ast	Sck	TFL	Int	Yds	Avg	Lng	TD	PD	FF	Fmb	FR	Yds	TD
2025	NYJ	12	8	45	16	29	0.0	0	0	0	0.0	0	0	0	0	0	0	0	0
Career		12	8	45	16	29	0.0	0	0	0	0.0	0	0	0	0	0	0	0	0

== Personal life ==
Mauigoa's brother, Francis, is an offensive tackle for the New York Giants.
