= Bobby Jamison-Travis =

American football player (born 2001)

No. 97 – New York Giants
- Position: Nose tackle
- Roster status: Active

Personal information
- Born: April 28, 2001 (age 25)
- Listed height: 6 ft 3 in (1.91 m)
- Listed weight: 328 lb (149 kg)

Career information
- High school: North (Minneapolis, Minnesota)
- College: Iowa Western (2020–2022); Auburn (2023–2025)
- NFL draft: 2026: 6th round, 186th overall pick

Career history
- New York Giants (2026–present)
- Stats at Pro Football Reference

Quientrail "Bobby" Jamison-Travis (born April 28, 2001) is an American professional football nose tackle for the New York Giants of the National Football League (NFL). He played college football for the Iowa Western Reivers and Auburn Tigers and was selected by the Giants in the sixth round of the 2026 NFL draft.

== Early life ==
Jamison-Travis was born on April 28, 2001, and grew up in Minneapolis, Minnesota, raised by his mother. After playing basketball growing up, he started playing football for the first time in junior high school. Jamison-Travis attended North Community High School where he competed in football, basketball, wrestling and track and field. In football, he was a two-way lineman and was part of a team that reached the 2019 state championship, being named all-state after recording 19 sacks. After high school, Jamison-Travis entered Iowa Western Community College.

== College career ==
Jamison-Travis posted 12 tackles, 1.5 tackles-for-loss (TFLs) and a sack as a freshman at Iowa Western in 2020–21. He then had 45 tackles, 6.5 TFLs and two sacks during the 2021 season. He returned to Iowa Western in 2022 and was named a first-team junior college All-American after totaling 45 tackles, 13.5 TFLs and 8.5 sacks, including 2.5 sacks in the NJCAA championship, a win for Iowa Western. Ranked the number three junior college prospect, Jamison-Travis transferred to the Auburn Tigers in 2023. He redshirted in his first year with the Tigers, appeared in three games while totaling six tackles. He then played in 12 games in 2024 and had 14 tackles, two TFLs and a sack in 2024. Jamison-Travis returned to Auburn for a final season in 2025 and had his best year, recording 36 tackles, two TFLs and two pass deflections. At the conclusion of his collegiate career, he received an invite to the NFL Scouting Combine.

== Professional career ==
Pre-draft measurables
Height	Weight	Arm length	Hand span	Wingspan	40-yard dash	10-yard split	20-yard split	20-yard shuttle	Three-cone drill	Vertical jump	Broad jump	Bench press
6 ft 3 3/8 in (1.91 m)	328 lb (149 kg)	34 1/4 in (0.87 m)	9 5/8 in (0.24 m)	6 ft 10 in (2.08 m)	5.26 s	1.80 s	2.98 s	4.64 s	8.01 s	25.0 in (0.64 m)	8 ft 9 in (2.67 m)	25 reps
All values from NFL Combine/Pro Day

Jamison-Travis was selected by the New York Giants in the sixth round (186th overall) of the 2026 NFL draft.
