= Gregory Desrosiers =

American football player (born 2001)

No. 30 – New York Giants
- Position: Running back
- Roster status: Active

Personal information
- Born: March 27, 2001 (age 25); Lawrence, Massachusetts, U.S.
- Listed height: 5 ft 11 in (1.80 m)
- Listed weight: 200 lb (91 kg)

Career information
- High school: Belmont Hill (Belmont, Massachusetts)
- College: Louisville (2020–2021); UMass (2022–2023); Memphis (2024–2025)
- NFL draft: 2026: undrafted

Career history
- Los Angeles Chargers (2026)*; New York Giants (2026–present)
- * Offseason or practice squad member only

Career NFL statistics as of Week 10, 2026
- Rushing yards: 20
- Rushing average: 6.7
- Stats at Pro Football Reference

Gregory Desrosiers (born March 27, 2001) is an American professional football running back for the New York Giants of the National Football League (NFL). He played college football for the Louisville Cardinals, UMass Minutemen, and Memphis Tigers.

== Early life ==
Desrosiers attended Belmont Hill School in Belmont, Massachusetts. He committed to play college football for the Louisville Cardinals.

== College career ==
In two seasons at Louisville from 2020 to 2021, Desrosiers played in seven games recording no statistics. After the 2021 season, he entered the NCAA transfer portal.

Desrosiers transferred to play for the UMass Minutemen. In two years with the Minutemen from 2022 to 2023, he ran for 511 yards and six touchdowns while also notching 23 receptions for 209 yards and two touchdowns. After the 2023 season, Desrosiers once again entered the NCAA transfer portal.

Desrosiers transferred to play for the Memphis Tigers. He finished the 2024 season with 31 carries for 228 rushing yards and three touchdowns, while hauling in 21 passes for 175 yards and four touchdowns. In week 5 of the 2025 season, he rushed for a career-high 204 yards and three touchdowns in a win versus Florida Atlantic. In week 8, Desrosiers ran for 74 yards and a touchdown on 11 carries and hauled in six passes for 40 yards in a loss to UAB. He finished the 2025 season with 563 rushing yards and seven touchdowns.

== Professional career ==
=== Los Angeles Chargers ===
After not being selected in the 2026 NFL draft, Desrosiers signed with the Los Angeles Chargers as an undrafted free agent. He was waived by Los Angeles as a part of final roster cuts on August 30, and re-signed to the team's practice squad the following day.

=== New York Giants ===
On October 27, 2026, Desrosiers was signed by the New York Giants off the Chargers practice squad.
