= Shelby Harris =

American football player (born 1991)

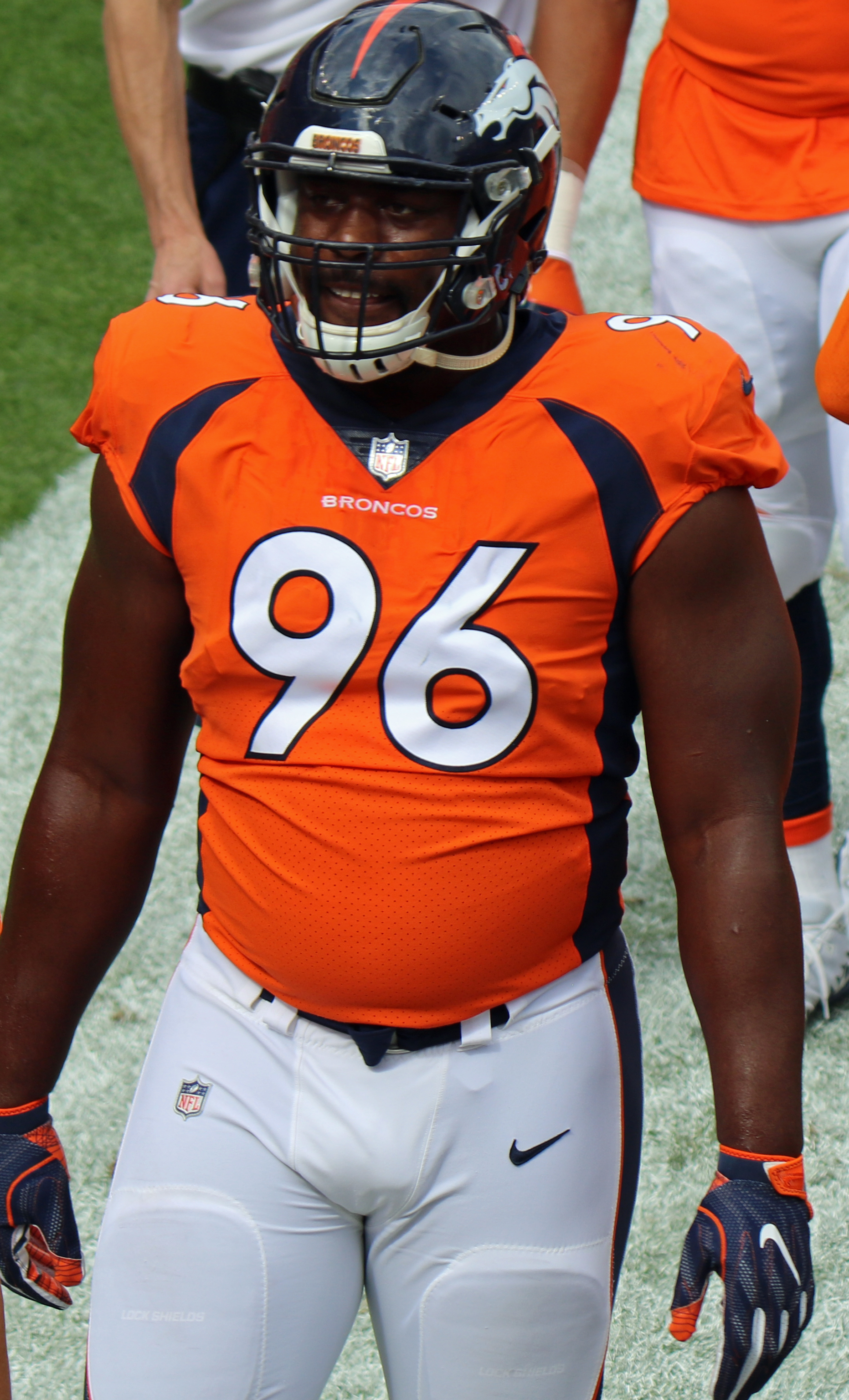
- Harris with the Denver Broncos in 2017

No. 93 – New York Giants
- Position: Defensive tackle
- Roster status: Active

Personal information
- Born: August 11, 1991 (age 35); Milwaukee, Wisconsin, U.S.
- Listed height: 6 ft 2 in (1.88 m)
- Listed weight: 288 lb (131 kg)

Career information
- High school: Homestead (Mequon, Wisconsin)
- College: Wisconsin (2009); Illinois State (2010–2012)
- NFL draft: 2014: 7th round, 235th overall pick

Career history
- Oakland Raiders (2014–2015); New York Jets (2016)*; Dallas Cowboys (2016)*; Denver Broncos (2017–2021); Seattle Seahawks (2022); Cleveland Browns (2023–2025); New York Giants (2026–present)
- * Offseason or practice squad member only

Career NFL statistics as of Week 10, 2026
- Total tackles: 378
- Sacks: 29.5
- Forced fumbles: 5
- Interceptions: 1
- Pass deflections: 42
- Stats at Pro Football Reference

Shelby Harris (born August 11, 1991) is an American professional football defensive tackle for the New York Giants of the National Football League (NFL). He played college football for the Illinois State Redbirds and was selected in the seventh round of the 2014 NFL draft by the Oakland Raiders, where he spent his first two seasons. After not making a final roster in 2016, Harris played his next five seasons with the Denver Broncos. Harris was traded to the Seahawks in 2022. He has also played for the Cleveland Browns.

== College career ==
Harris initially went to the University of Wisconsin to play for the Badgers. After redshirting his freshman year, he transferred to Illinois State. In 2010, he was named to the Missouri Valley Football Conference all-newcomer team. In 2012, he started all thirteen games as the Redbirds reached the FCS national quarterfinals, and he was named to the all-MVFC first-team. But before the 2013 season, he was dismissed from the Redbirds for conduct detrimental to the team.

== Professional career ==
Pre-draft measurables
Height	Weight	Arm length	Hand span	Wingspan	40-yard dash	10-yard split	20-yard split	20-yard shuttle	Three-cone drill	Vertical jump	Broad jump	Bench press
6 ft 1 3/4 in (1.87 m)	288 lb (131 kg)	34 5/8 in (0.88 m)	9 1/2 in (0.24 m)	6 ft 10 3/8 in (2.09 m)	4.88 s	1.68 s	2.78 s	4.57 s	7.52 s	32.0 in (0.81 m)	9 ft 2 in (2.79 m)	25 reps
All values from Pro Day

=== Oakland Raiders ===
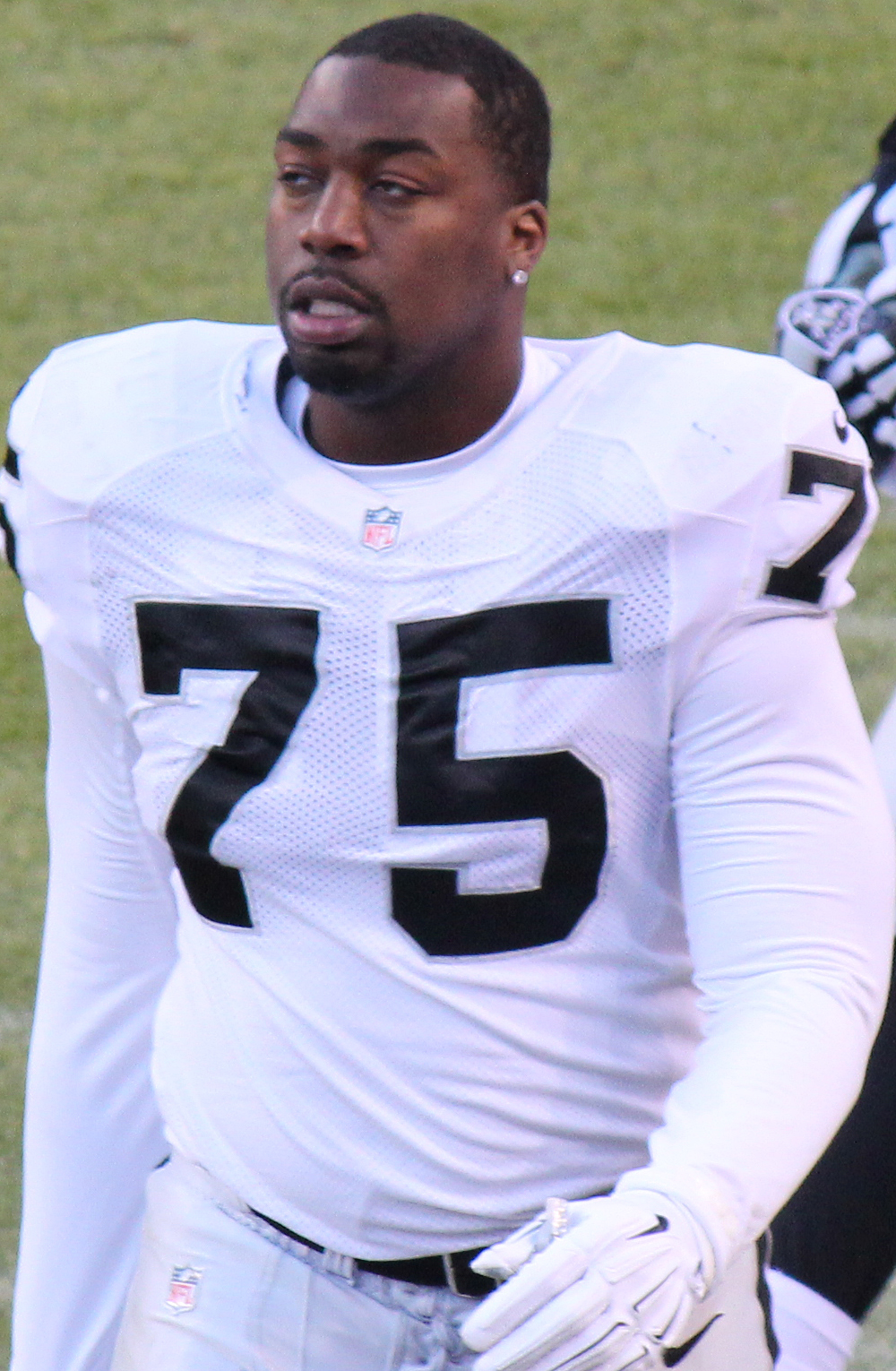
Harris with the Raiders in 2014

Harris was selected by the Oakland Raiders in the seventh round of the 2014 NFL draft with the 235th overall pick. On May 20, 2014, he signed his contract with the Raiders. On September 18, Harris was waived. On September 20, he was signed to the Raiders' practice squad. On December 24, he was elevated to the active roster. On September 5, 2015, he was waived. On September 9, Harris was re-signed to the practice squad. On October 24, he was elevated to the active roster. On October 31, he was waived again. On November 3, Harris was re-signed to the practice squad. On November 19, he was elevated to the active roster again. On May 16, 2016, Harris was released by the Raiders.

=== New York Jets ===
On June 1, 2016, Harris was signed by the New York Jets. On August 28, Harris was waived by the Jets.

=== Dallas Cowboys ===
On December 22, 2016, Harris was signed to the Dallas Cowboys' practice squad. He was released on January 10, 2017.

=== Denver Broncos ===
On January 25, 2017, Harris signed a reserve/future contract with the Denver Broncos. On September 11, on Monday Night Football Harris saved the game for the Broncos with a late-game block of a field goal by Los Angeles Chargers rookie Younghoe Koo. Harris went on to have the most productive season of his career, recording 34 tackles, 3 passes defended, and 5.5 sacks, the last of which was good for second on the team behind teammate Von Miller.

On November 25, 2018, Harris recorded his first career interception. Harris intercepted Ben Roethlisberger in the endzone to prevent a would-be game-tying touchdown and seal an upset win for the Broncos.

On March 7, 2019, the Broncos placed a second-round restricted free agent tender on Harris. In week 11 against the Minnesota Vikings, Harris sacked Kirk Cousins 3 times, one of which was a strip sack which was recovered by teammate A.J. Johnson in the 27–23 loss. In the final game of the season against the Oakland Raiders, he preserved the Broncos' 16–15 victory by knocking down Derek Carr's pass on what would have been the game-winning two-point conversion.

On April 2, 2020, the Broncos re-signed Harris to a one-year, $3.25 million contract. He was placed on the reserve/COVID-19 list by the team on November 4, 2020, and activated on December 2. On December 31, 2020, Harris was placed on injured reserve. He started 11 games in 2020, recording 32 tackles, 2.5 sacks, one forced fumble, and seven pass deflections, which tied for the league lead for defensive lineman.

On March 15, 2021, Harris signed a three-year, $27 million contract extension with the Broncos.

=== Seattle Seahawks ===
On March 16, 2022, Harris was traded to the Seattle Seahawks along with two first-round picks, two second-round picks, a fifth-round pick, quarterback Drew Lock, and tight end Noah Fant in exchange for quarterback Russell Wilson and a fourth-round pick. He started 14 games in 2022, recording 44 tackles, two sacks, and four passes defensed.

On March 14, 2023, Harris was released by the Seahawks.

=== Cleveland Browns ===
On August 10, 2023, Harris signed with the Cleveland Browns. He played in 17 games with seven starts, recording 28 tackles, 1.5 sacks, and five passes defensed.

On March 14, 2024, Harris signed a one-year contract extension with the Browns.

=== New York Giants ===
On April 29, 2026, Harris signed a one-year contract with the New York Giants.

== NFL career statistics ==
Legend
**Bold**	Career high

=== Regular season ===
Year	Team	Games		Tackles					Interceptions						Fumbles			
Year	Team	GP	GS	Cmb	Solo	Ast	Sck	TFL	PD	Int	Yds	Avg	Lng	TD	FF	FR	Yds	TD
2014	OAK	1	0	2	1	1	0.0	0	0	0	–	–	–	–	0	0	–	–
2015	OAK	7	0	12	9	3	1.0	1	0	0	–	–	–	–	0	0	–	–
2017	DEN	16	6	34	22	12	5.5	7	3	0	–	–	–	–	0	0	–	–
2018	DEN	16	0	39	23	16	1.5	**8**	4	**1**	0	0.0	0	0	0	0	–	–
2019	DEN	16	**16**	**49**	**28**	21	**6.0**	**8**	**9**	0	–	–	–	–	**1**	0	–	–
2020	DEN	11	11	32	20	12	2.5	4	7	0	–	–	–	–	**1**	0	–	–
2021	DEN	16	**16**	**49**	24	**25**	**6.0**	7	2	0	–	–	–	–	**1**	0	–	–
2022	SEA	15	15	44	24	20	2.0	5	4	0	–	–	–	–	0	0	–	–
2023	CLE	**17**	7	28	17	11	1.5	6	5	0	–	–	–	–	**1**	0	–	–
2024	CLE	14	13	37	18	19	1.5	5	2	0	–	–	–	–	**1**	0	–	–
2025	CLE	**17**	5	32	15	17	1.0	7	4	0	–	–	–	–	0	0	–	–
2026	NYG	9	9	20	9	11	1.0	2	2	0	–	–	–	–	0	0	–	–
Career		155	98	378	210	168	29.5	60	42	1	0	0.0	0	0	5	0	0	0

=== Postseason ===
Year	Team	Games		Tackles					Interceptions						Fumbles			
Year	Team	GP	GS	Cmb	Solo	Ast	Sck	TFL	PD	Int	Yds	Avg	Lng	TD	FF	FR	Yds	TD
2022	SEA	**1**	**1**	**3**	**3**	0	0.0	0	0	0	–	–	–	–	0	0	–	–
2023	CLE	**1**	**1**	2	1	**1**	0.0	0	0	0	–	–	–	–	0	0	–	–
Career		2	2	5	4	1	0.0	0	0	0	0	0.0	0	0	0	0	0	0

== Media appearances ==
Harris was featured on WNYC's podcast "Death, Sex and Money" on September 5, 2020, with host Anna Sale. On the show, Harris revealed what it's like to be an NFL player during the COVID-19 pandemic and what it's like to be a Black man in America during the Black Lives Matter movement.
