= Dexter Lawrence =

American football player (born 1997)

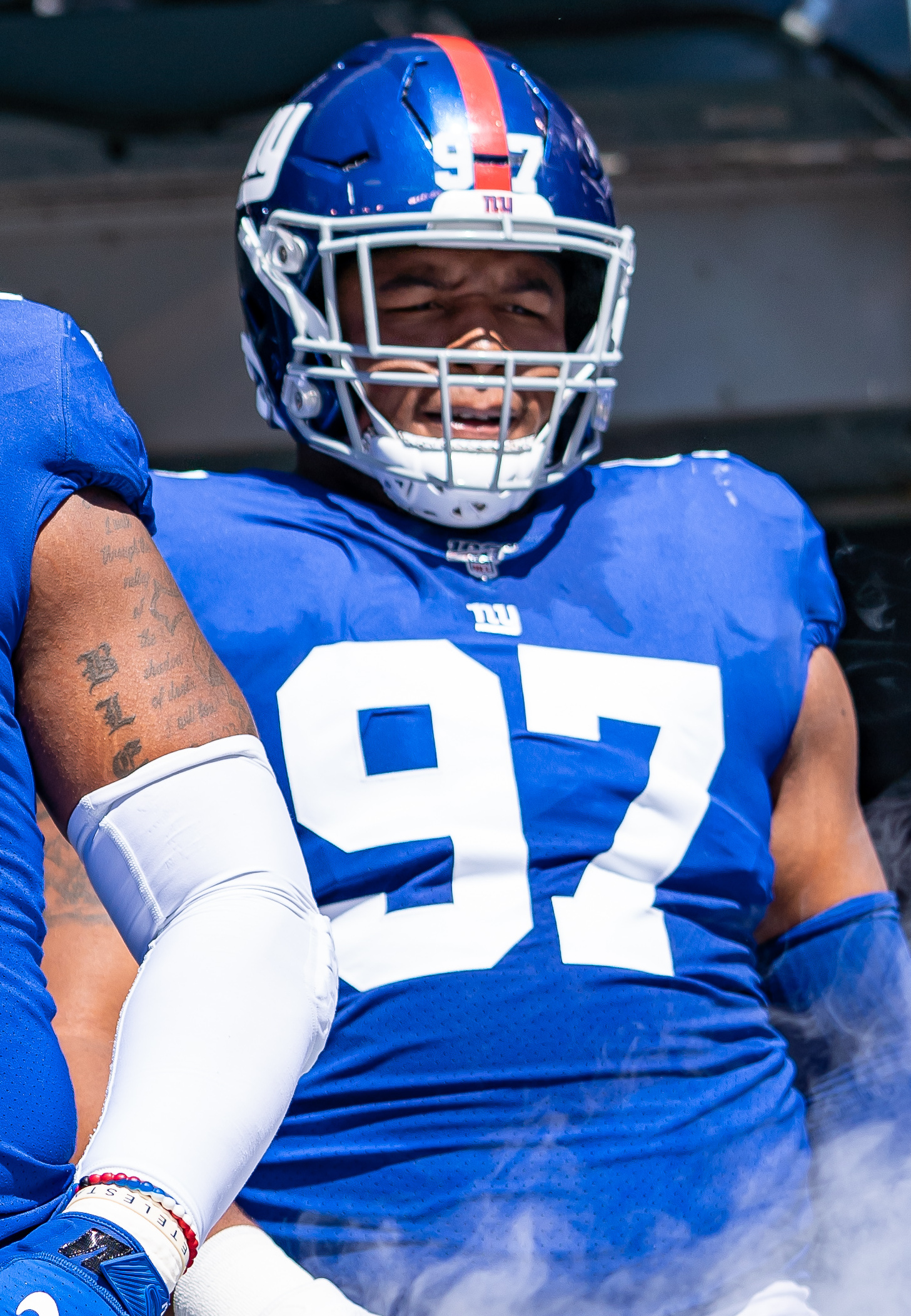
- Lawrence with the New York Giants in 2019

No. 97 – Cincinnati Bengals
- Position: Nose tackle
- Roster status: Active

Personal information
- Born: November 12, 1997 (age 29); Wake Forest, North Carolina, U.S.
- Listed height: 6 ft 5 in (1.96 m)
- Listed weight: 350 lb (159 kg)

Career information
- High school: Wake Forest
- College: Clemson (2016–2018)
- NFL draft: 2019: 1st round, 17th overall pick

Career history
- New York Giants (2019–2025); Cincinnati Bengals (2026–present)

Awards and highlights
- 2× Second-team All-Pro (2022, 2023); 3× Pro Bowl (2022–2024); PFWA All-Rookie Team (2019); 2× CFP national champion (2016, 2018); First-team All-American (2018); 2× First-team All-ACC (2017, 2018); Second-team All-ACC (2016); ACC Defensive Rookie of the Year (2016)

Career NFL statistics as of Week 10, 2026
- Total tackles: 369
- Sacks: 35.5
- Forced fumbles: 5
- Fumble recoveries: 1
- Pass deflections: 16
- Interceptions: 1
- Stats at Pro Football Reference

Dexter Lawrence II (born November 12, 1997), nicknamed "Sexy Dexy", is an American professional football nose tackle for the Cincinnati Bengals of the National Football League (NFL). He played college football for the Clemson Tigers and was selected by the New York Giants in the first round of the 2019 NFL draft.

== Early life ==
Lawrence played his entire high school football career at Wake Forest High School. In his sophomore and junior years, Wake Forest made it to the NCHSAA 4AA state championship game, finishing as runner-up against Mallard Creek High School both times. During his high school career, Lawrence was credited with 28.0 sacks, 204 tackles, 6 forced fumbles and 1 interception.

The nation's 2nd ranked recruit, Lawrence was the highest ranked prospect to ever come out of the state of North Carolina. He considered multiple schools, including Clemson Tigers, Florida Gators, Florida State Seminoles, Alabama Crimson Tide and NC State Wolfpack. In the end, he signed with Clemson.

College recruiting
Name	Hometown	School	Height	Weight	40^{‡}	Commit date
Dexter Lawrence; DT	Wake Forest, North Carolina	Wake Forest High School	6 ft 5 in (1.96 m)	340 lb (150 kg)	5.00	Dec 14, 2015
Dexter Lawrence; DT	Recruit ratings: Scout: Rivals: 247Sports: (91)					
Overall recruit ranking: Scout: 2 (DT); 2 (East); 1 (NC) Rivals: 2 (DT); 2 (Natl); 1 (NC) 247Sports: 2 (Natl); 2 (DT); 1 (NC) ESPN: 3 (DT); 4 (East); 1 (NC)
Note: In many cases, Scout, Rivals, 247Sports, On3, and ESPN may conflict in their listings of height and weight.; In these cases, the average was taken. ESPN grades are on a 100-point scale.; Sources: "Clemson Football Commitments". Rivals.; "2016 Clemson Football Commits". Scout.; "ESPN". ESPN.; "Scout.com Team Recruiting Rankings". Scout.; "2016 Team Ranking". Rivals.com.

== College career ==
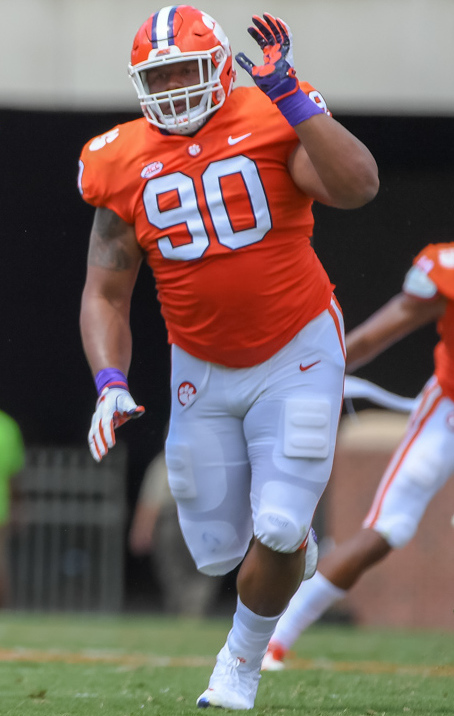
Lawrence in 2018

In 2016, Lawrence played in 12 games for the Tigers at defensive tackle. Throughout the regular season, he recorded 55 tackles and five sacks. The five sacks he recorded in his freshman year is a Clemson record. Lawrence beat the previous record of four set by William Perry, Ricky Sapp, and Shaq Lawson. Lawrence was subsequently named the 2016 ACC Defensive Rookie of the Year. Lawrence was part of the Clemson team that defeated Alabama in the 2017 College Football Playoff National Championship by a score of 35–31. In the game, he recorded four total tackles. Dexter was ruled ineligible for the 2019 College Football Playoff after testing positive for the banned substance ostarine. After the season, Lawrence decided to forgo his senior year and enter the 2019 NFL draft.

== Professional career ==
=== Pre-draft ===
Pre-draft measurables
Height	Weight	Arm length	Hand span	Wingspan	40-yard dash	10-yard split	Bench press	Wonderlic
6 ft 4 1/2 in (1.94 m)	342 lb (155 kg)	34 3/4 in (0.88 m)	10 1/2 in (0.27 m)	7 ft 0 in (2.13 m)	5.05 s	1.76 s	36 reps	17
All values from 2019 NFL Combine

=== New York Giants ===
Lawrence injured his left leg during his attempt at the 40-yard dash during the 2019 NFL Combine. Lawrence was selected by the New York Giants in the first round with the 17th overall pick in the 2019 NFL draft. The Giants originally acquired the selection as part of a trade that sent Odell Beckham Jr. to the Cleveland Browns.

==== 2019 ====
In Week 3 against the Tampa Bay Buccaneers, Lawrence recorded his first career sack on Jameis Winston in the 32-31 win. In Week 5 against the Minnesota Vikings, Lawrence recorded a sack and a forced fumble on Kirk Cousins in the 28-10 loss. As a rookie, he started in all 16 games. He finished with 2.5 sacks, 38 total tackles (24 solo), one pass defended, and one forced fumble as the Giants went 4–12. He was named to the PFWA All-Rookie Team.

==== 2020 ====
In the 2020 season, Lawrence appeared in 16 games and started 15. He finished with four sacks, 53 total tackles (30 solo), and two passes defended as the Giants went 6–10.

==== 2021 ====
During Week 2 of the 2021 season against the Washington Football Team, Lawrence jumped offsides on the final play of the 4th quarter, a Dustin Hopkins missed field goal, which nullified the Washington kick attempt. The Giants would lose 29–30 on Hopkins' successful re-kick, dropping to 0–2 for the fifth consecutive season. In the 2021 season, he appeared in 16 games and started 11. He finished with 2.5 sacks, 54 total tackles (27 solo), two passes defended, and one forced fumble.

==== 2022 ====
On April 28, 2022, the Giants picked up the fifth-year option on Lawrence’s rookie contract.

The 2022 season marked a career year for Lawrence. In Week 4, he tallied 2 sacks against the Chicago Bears, the first multi-sack game of his career, then earned praise from Aaron Rodgers following their comeback victory over the Green Bay Packers a week later. In a Week 15 tilt against the Washington Commanders, he forced an incomplete pass from Taylor Heinicke that turned out to be a key forced fumble which the Giants recovered. The Giants made the playoffs in 2022 for the first time in his career. He finished the 2022 season with 7.5 sacks, 68 tackles, 28 quarterback hits and 2 forced fumbles. As well as being selected to his first Pro Bowl and first All-Pro team. He was ranked 28th by his fellow players on the NFL Top 100 Players of 2023.

==== 2023 ====
On May 4, 2023, Lawrence signed a four-year, $90 million extension with the Giants.

In Week 8 of the 2023 New York Giants season, Lawrence recorded a sack, a tackle-for-loss, 5 quarterback hits, and 15 quarterback pressures against the New York Jets, which tied the record for the most pressures in a single game by an interior defender. He finished the 2023 season with 4.5 sacks, 53 total tackles (32 solo), and two passes defended. He earned Pro Bowl honors and second team All-Pro honors for the 2023 season. He was ranked 24th by his fellow players on the NFL Top 100 Players of 2024.

==== 2024 ====
In Week 5 of the 2024 season against the Seattle Seahawks, Lawrence recorded a single-game career high three sacks on Geno Smith. In Week 12, Lawrence suffered a season ending injury. The 2024 season marked a career year for Lawrence, recording nine sacks in only 12 games. He was named to his third Pro Bowl. He was named to the 2024 NFLPA All-Pro team. He was ranked 17th by his fellow players on the NFL Top 100 Players of 2025.

==== 2025 ====
In the 2025 season, Lawrence had a half-sack, 31 total tackles, one interception, and four passes defended.

=== Cincinnati Bengals ===
==== 2026 ====
On April 6, 2026, Lawrence requested a trade from the Giants due to a lack of progress in negotiations on a new contract. On April 19, the Giants traded Lawrence to the Cincinnati Bengals in exchange for the tenth overall draft pick (which the Giants later used to select Francis Mauigoa) in the 2026 NFL draft. Lawrence signed a one-year, $28 million contract extension with the Bengals; keeping him under contract through the 2028 season.

== Career statistics ==
=== NFL ===
==== Regular season ====
Year	Team	Games		Tackles						Interceptions						Fumbles			
Year	Team	GP	GS	Cmb	Solo	Ast	Sck	TFL	QBHits	PD	Int	Yds	Avg	Lng	TD	FF	FR	Yds	TD
2019	NYG	16	16	38	24	14	2.5	3	9	1	0	0	0.0	0	0	1	0	0	0
2020	NYG	16	15	53	30	23	4.0	6	10	2	0	0	0.0	0	0	0	0	0	0
2021	NYG	16	10	54	27	27	2.5	5	11	2	0	0	0.0	0	0	1	0	0	0
2022	NYG	16	16	68	35	33	7.5	7	28	3	0	0	0.0	0	0	2	0	0	0
2023	NYG	16	16	53	32	21	4.5	7	21	2	0	0	0.0	0	0	0	0	0	0
2024	NYG	12	12	44	23	21	9.0	8	16	1	0	0	0.0	0	0	1	0	0	0
2025	NYG	17	17	31	14	17	0.5	4	8	4	1	37	37.0	37	0	0	0	0	0
2026	CIN	9	9	28	17	11	5.0	9	8	1	0	0	0.0	0	0	0	1	0	0
Career		118	111	369	202	167	35.5	49	111	16	1	37	37.0	37	0	5	1	0	0

==== Postseason ====
Year	Team	Games		Tackles						Interceptions						Fumbles			
Year	Team	GP	GS	Cmb	Solo	Ast	Sck	TFL	QBHits	PD	Int	Yds	Avg	Lng	TD	FF	FR	Yds	TD
2022	NYG	2	2	12	6	6	0.0	1	4	0	0	0	0	0	0	0	0	0	0
Career		2	2	12	6	6	0.0	1	4	0	0	0	0	0	0	0	0	0	0

=== College ===
Season	Team	Class	GP	Tackles					Interceptions					Fumbles			
Season	Team	Class	GP	Solo	Ast	Cmb	TfL	Sck	Int	Yds	Avg	TD	PD	FR	Yds	TD	FF
2016	Clemson	FR	14	22	40	62	8.5	6.5	0	0	0.0	0	1	2	0	0	0
2017	Clemson	SO	11	13	20	33	2.5	2.0	0	0	0.0	0	0	0	0	0	1
2018	Clemson	JR	13	15	21	36	7.0	1.5	1	0	0.0	0	3	1	0	0	0
Career			38	50	81	131	18.0	10.0	1	0	0.0	0	4	3	0	0	1
