= Francis Mauigoa =

American Samoan football player (born 2005)

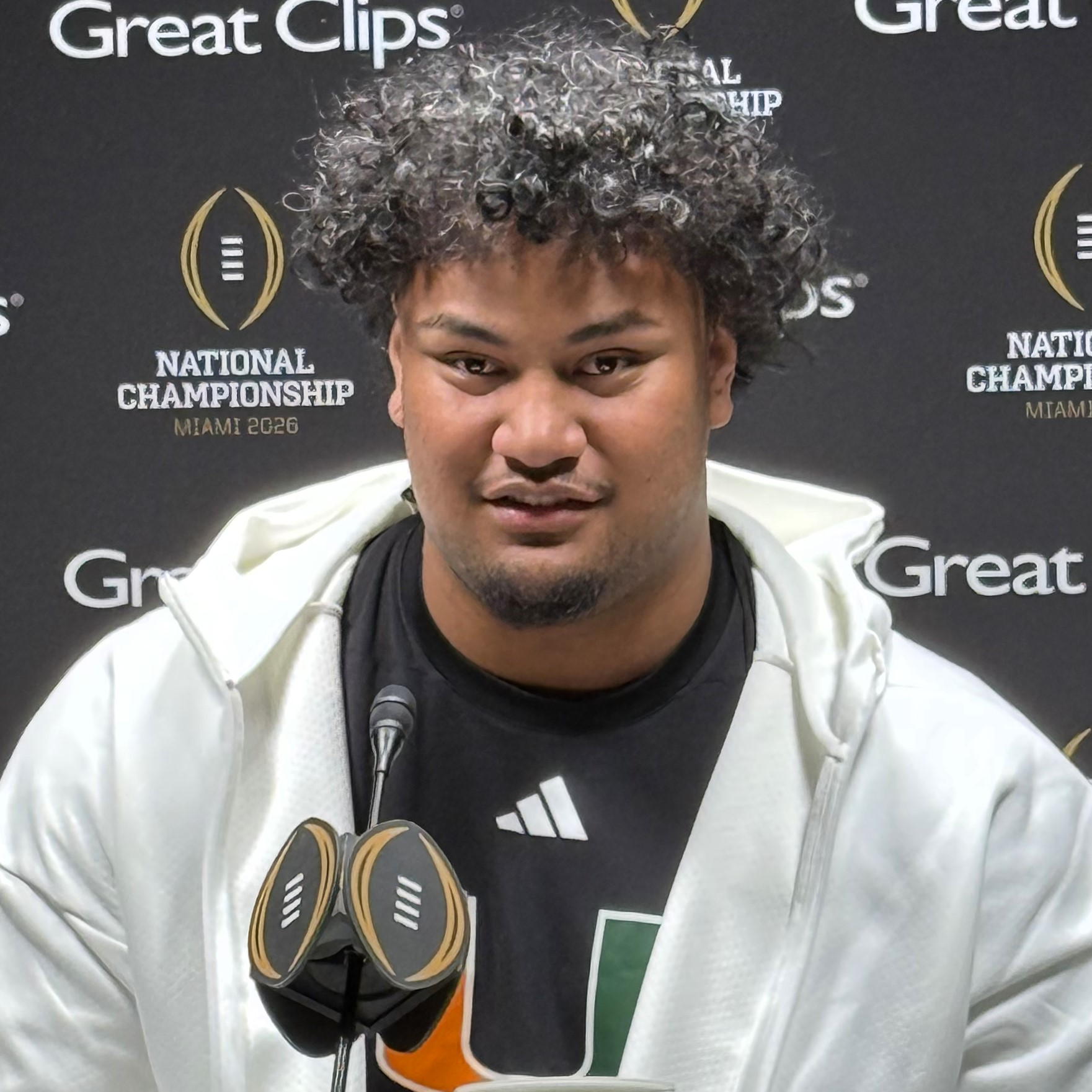
- Mauigoa with the Miami Hurricanes in 2026

No. 65 – New York Giants
- Position: Guard
- Roster status: Active

Personal information
- Born: June 4, 2005 (age 21) ʻIliʻili, American Samoa
- Listed height: 6 ft 6 in (1.98 m)
- Listed weight: 329 lb (149 kg)

Career information
- High school: IMG (Bradenton, Florida, U.S.)
- College: Miami (FL) (2023–2025)
- NFL draft: 2026: 1st round, 10th overall pick

Career history
- New York Giants (2026–present)

Awards and highlights
- Consensus All-American (2025); Jacobs Blocking Trophy (2025); First-team All-ACC (2025); Second-team All-ACC (2024); Freshman All-American (2023)

Career NFL statistics as of Week 4, 2026
- Games played: 4
- Games started: 4
- Stats at Pro Football Reference

Francis "Sisi" Mauigoa (/maʊiˈnoʊə/ mow-ee-NOH-ə; born June 4, 2005) is an American Samoan football guard for the New York Giants of the National Football League (NFL). Mauigoa played college football for the Miami Hurricanes and was selected tenth overall by the Giants in the 2026 NFL draft. He is the younger brother of New York Jets linebacker Francisco Mauigoa.

== Early life ==
Mauigoa was born on June 4, 2005. He attended Aquinas High School (California) in San Bernardino, California, garnering national attention as a two-way lineman. He then attended IMG Academy in Bradenton, Florida, and was one of the top players in the 2023 college football recruiting class, ranked No. 5 nationally by ESPN and No. 8 by 247Sports.

== College career ==
In July 2022, Mauigoa, the top tackle prospect in the country, committed to the University of Miami. He also had offers from Florida, Alabama, Tennessee, Oregon, and USC. He was selected by 247Sports as a 2023 preseason freshman All-American. Bruce Friedman of The Athletic included him on the 2023 "Freak List".

On January 22, 2026, Mauigoa declared for the 2026 NFL draft.

== Professional career ==
Pre-draft measurables
Height	Weight	Arm length	Hand span	Wingspan	40-yard dash	10-yard split	20-yard split	20-yard shuttle	Three-cone drill	Vertical jump	Broad jump
6 ft 5 1/2 in (1.97 m)	329 lb (149 kg)	33 1/4 in (0.84 m)	10 5/8 in (0.27 m)	6 ft 8 3/4 in (2.05 m)	5.14 s	1.78 s	3.05 s	4.59 s	7.77 s	29.0 in (0.74 m)	8 ft 10 in (2.69 m)
All values from NFL Combine/Pro Day

Mauigoa was selected in the first round, tenth overall by the New York Giants in the 2026 NFL draft, using the selection they acquired from the Cincinnati Bengals in a trade for Dexter Lawrence. He moved inside to play offensive guard.

== Personal life ==
Mauigoa's brother, Francisco, is a linebacker for the New York Jets.
