= Dennard Wilson =

American football player and coach (born 1982)

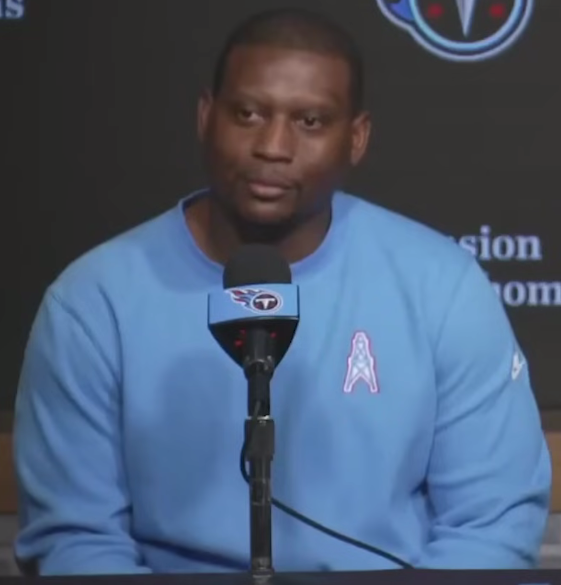
- Wilson with the Tennessee Titans in 2024

New York Giants
- Title: Defensive coordinator

Personal information
- Born: March 31, 1982 (age 44); Upper Marlboro, Maryland, U.S.

Career information
- Position: Safety
- High school: DeMatha Catholic (Hyattsville, Maryland)
- College: Maryland
- NFL draft: 2004: undrafted

Career history

Playing
- Washington Redskins (2004)

Coaching
- DeMatha HS (MD) (2004–2006) Passing game coordinator & defensive backs coach; Maryland (2007–2008) Graduate assistant; St. Louis / Los Angeles Rams (2012–2016); Defensive quality control coach (2012–2014); Defensive backs coach (2015–2016); New York Jets (2017–2020); Defensive backs coach (2017–2018); Passing game coordinator & defensive backs coach (2019–2020); Philadelphia Eagles (2021–2022); Defensive backs coach (2021); Passing game coordinator & defensive backs coach (2022); Baltimore Ravens (2023) Defensive backs coach; Tennessee Titans (2024–2025) Defensive coordinator; New York Giants (2026–present) Defensive coordinator

Operations
- Chicago Bears (2008–2011) Pro scout
- Coaching profile at Pro Football Reference

Dennard Wilson (born March 31, 1982) is an American professional football coach and former safety who is the defensive coordinator for the New York Giants of the National Football League (NFL). He is a former American football safety in the NFL who was signed as a free agent by the Washington Redskins in 2004. He played college football at the University of Maryland and graduated with a bachelor's degree in communications.

== Playing career ==
Wilson played cornerback and safety for the Maryland Terrapins from 2000 until 2003, appearing in 42 games and making 30 starts. He totaled 158 tackles and was an honorable All-ACC pick as a senior after leading the Terrapins with 12 pass defenses. Wilson was a four-year letter winner and three-year starting defensive back for the Terps. As a captain of the team, Wilson was an honorable mention All-ACC performer as a senior in 2003. An undrafted free agent, Wilson signed with the Washington Redskins in 2004 and spent time on their practice squad before suffering a season-ending injury.

== Coaching career ==
=== Chicago Bears ===
Wilson spent three years as a pro scout in the player personnel department for the Chicago Bears from 2008 through 2011.

=== Maryland ===
Wilson was graduate assistant for Maryland from 2007 to 2008.

=== St. Louis/Los Angeles Rams ===
Wilson started his NFL coaching career with the Los Angeles/St. Louis Rams for five seasons. Under head coach Jeff Fisher, Wilson served as defensive quality control coach for the St. Louis Rams from 2012 to 2014 and promoted to defensive backs coach from 2015 to 2016.

=== New York Jets ===
Following his stint with the Rams, Wilson coached four seasons with the New York Jets as the defensive backs coach from 2017 to 2020. He added passing game coordinator duties as well in 2019. Under Wilson's tutelage, Jamal Adams earned All-Pro and Pro Bowl honors following the 2018 and '19 seasons after ranking first in sacks and tackles for loss among all NFL defensive backs during that span.

=== Philadelphia Eagles ===
Wilson moved on to be the defensive backs coach for the Philadelphia Eagles in 2021. Named as the Passing game coordinator during the 2022–2023 season, Wilson's defensive backs helped the Eagles to be the #1 passing defense while finishing #2 total defense in the NFL. During this season, cornerbacks James Bradberry was named NFL 2nd team All-Pro and Darius Slay was named to his 5th Pro Bowl. In addition, safety C. J. Gardner-Johnson was converted from slot corner and led the NFL in interceptions while only playing in 12 games.

=== Baltimore Ravens ===
Following the 2022–23 season, Dennard departed the Eagles. Shortly after he was named defensive backs coach with the Baltimore Ravens. Kyle Hamilton was named to the 2023-2024 All-Pro and Pro Bowl teams as the Baltimore Ravens strong safety. The Ravens finished the regular season with a triple crown NFL record as the first team in history to lead the league in points allowed (16.5 per game), sacks (60), and takeaways (31).

=== Tennessee Titans ===
On February 5, 2024, Wilson was hired as defensive coordinator for the Tennessee Titans. Under Wilson, Jeffery Simmons was named to the 2025 All-Pro and 2025 All-NFL teams. Simmons was also named to the 2024 and 2025 Pro Bowl teams. On January 22, 2026, it was announced that Wilson would not be retained under new head coach Robert Saleh.

=== New York Giants ===
On January 25, 2026, the New York Giants hired Wilson to serve as their defensive coordinator under new head coach John Harbaugh.
