= Bobby Okereke =

American football player (born 1996)

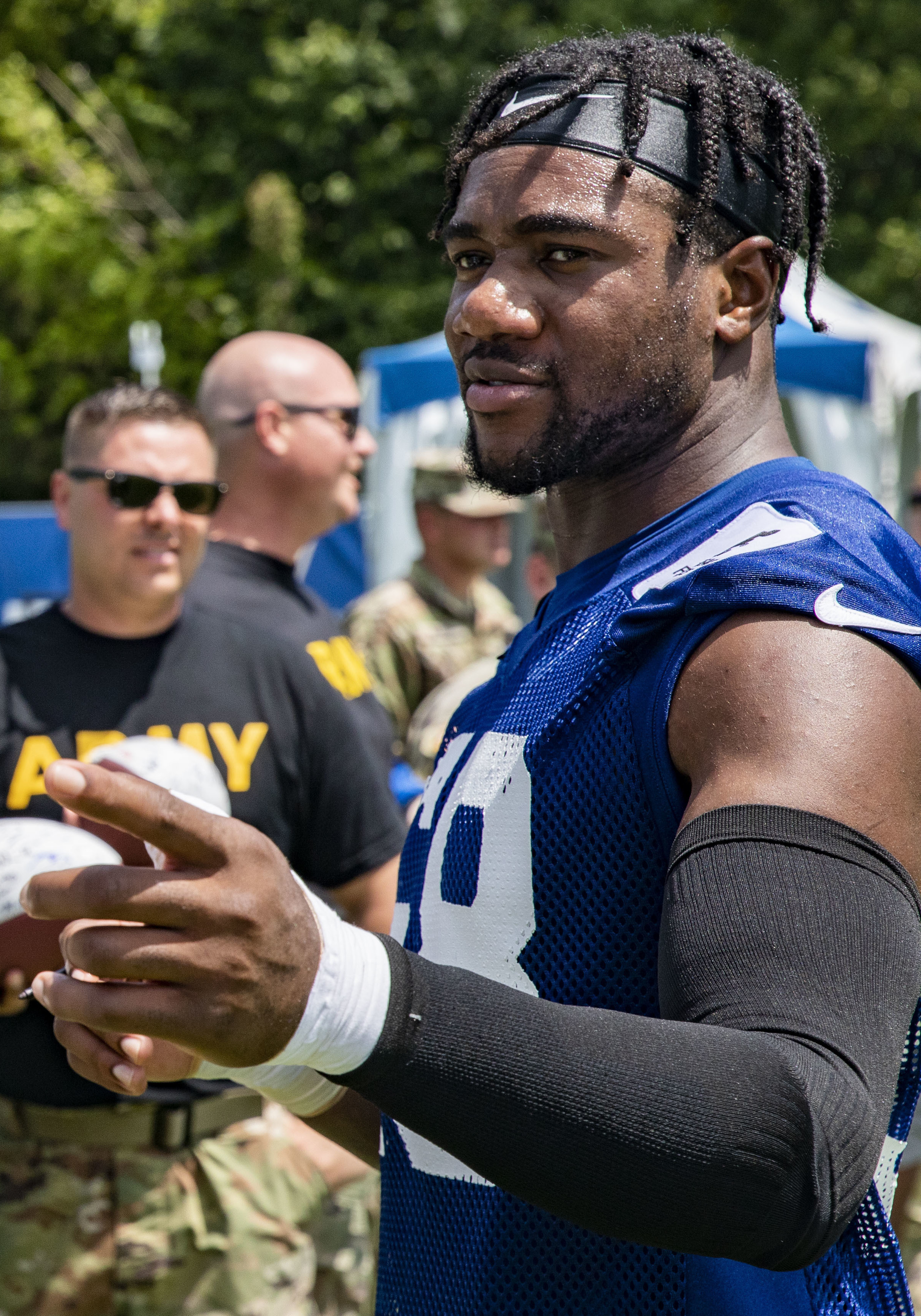
- Okereke with the Indianapolis Colts in 2022

No. 58 – Carolina Panthers
- Position: Outside linebacker
- Roster status: Active

Personal information
- Born: July 29, 1996 (age 30); Santa Ana, California, U.S.
- Listed height: 6 ft 2 in (1.88 m)
- Listed weight: 235 lb (107 kg)

Career information
- High school: Foothill (Santa Ana)
- College: Stanford (2014–2018)
- NFL draft: 2019: 3rd round, 89th overall pick

Career history
- Indianapolis Colts (2019–2022); New York Giants (2023–2025); Carolina Panthers (2026–present)

Career NFL statistics as of Week 8, 2026
- Total tackles: 854
- Sacks: 8.5
- Forced fumbles: 12
- Fumble recoveries: 9
- Interceptions: 8
- Pass deflections: 41
- Stats at Pro Football Reference

Robert Nnanna Okereke (/oʊkərəˈkeɪ/ oh-kər-ə-KAY; born July 29, 1996) is an American professional football outside linebacker for the Carolina Panthers of the National Football League (NFL). He played college football for the Stanford Cardinal and was selected by the Indianapolis Colts in the third round of the 2019 NFL draft.

== Early life ==
Okereke was born in Santa Ana, California to parents who emigrated from Nigeria. At age 16, he became an Eagle Scout with Troop 243. He attended and played high school football at Foothill High School.

== College career ==
Okereke attended and played college football at Stanford University. He redshirted as a freshman in 2014. He contributed on the field from 2015 to 2018. He recorded 227 total tackles (20.0 were for loss), 10.5 sacks, one interception (a 52-yard pick-six), eight passes defensed, one fumble recovery, and three forced fumbles. He was named Pac-12 Honorable Mention in 2017 and 2018.

=== College statistics ===
Year	School	Conf	Class	Pos	G	Tackles					Interceptions					Fumbles			
Year	School	Conf	Class	Pos	G	Solo	Ast	Tot	Loss	Sk	Int	Yds	Avg	TD	PD	FR	Yds	TD	FF
2015	Stanford	Pac-12	SO	LB	6	2	4	6	0.0	0.0	0	0	0.0	0	1	0	0	0	0
2016	Stanford	Pac-12	JR	LB	12	12	27	39	4.0	3.0	0	0	0.0	0	1	0	0	0	0
2017	Stanford	Pac-12	SR	LB	13	56	32	88	8.5	4.0	1	52	52.0	1	1	0	0	0	1
2018	Stanford	Pac-12	SR	LB	13	52	42	94	7.5	3.5	0	0	0.0	0	5	1	0	0	2
Career					44	122	105	227	20.0	10.5	1	52	52.0	1	8	1	0	0	3

== Professional career ==
Pre-draft measurables
Height	Weight	Arm length	Hand span	Wingspan	40-yard dash	10-yard split	20-yard split	20-yard shuttle	Three-cone drill	Vertical jump	Broad jump	Bench press
6 ft 1 3/8 in (1.86 m)	239 lb (108 kg)	34 1/2 in (0.88 m)	10 1/8 in (0.26 m)	6 ft 10 5/8 in (2.10 m)	4.58 s	1.61 s	2.67 s	4.26 s	7.02 s	33.5 in (0.85 m)	10 ft 2 in (3.10 m)	16 reps
All values from NFL Combine/Pro Day

=== Indianapolis Colts ===
Okereke was selected by the Indianapolis Colts in the third round (89th overall) of the 2019 NFL draft. The pick was announced by former Colts punter Pat McAfee. He made his NFL debut in the season opener against the Los Angeles Chargers. He earned his first career start in Week 3 against the Atlanta Falcons. In Week 13 against the Tennessee Titans, Okereke recorded a strip sack on Ryan Tannehill which was recovered by teammate Justin Houston in the 31–17 loss. This was Okereke's first career sack in the NFL. In the 2019 season, he recorded one sack, 65 total tackles, two passes defended, and two forced fumbles.

In Week 5 of the 2020 season against the Cleveland Browns, Okereke recorded his first career interception off a pass thrown by Baker Mayfield during the 32–23 loss. In the 2020 season, he recorded 72 total tackles, one interception, and six passes defended.

In the 2021 season, Okereke started in all 17 games. He finished with one sack, 132 total tackles, two interceptions, and four passes defended.

In the 2022 season, Okereke started in all 17 games. He finished with 151 total tackles, five passes defended, and two forced fumbles.

=== New York Giants ===
On March 16, 2023, Okereke signed a four-year contract with the New York Giants. In the 2023 NFL season, he recorded 149 total tackles, 11 tackles for loss, 2.5 sacks, 4 forced fumbles, 2 interceptions, and 10 passes defensed. Okereke, along with teammate Xavier McKinney, were the only defenders in the NFL to not miss a snap in the entire season. In the 2024 season, he had two sacks, 93 tackles, three passes defended, three forced fumbles, and two fumble recoveries.

During Week 18 of the 2025 season, Okereke was named the NFC Defensive Player of the Week for his two turnovers that lead to 10 points and a 34–17 Giants win over the Dallas Cowboys. Okereke finished 2025 with a team-leading 143 tackles. On March 4, 2026, Okereke was released by the Giants.

=== Carolina Panthers ===
On August 31, 2026, Okereke signed with the Carolina Panthers on a one–year contract.

== NFL career statistics ==
=== Regular season ===
Year	Team	Games		Tackles						Interceptions						Fumbles			
Year	Team	GP	GS	Cmb	Solo	Ast	Sck	TFL	QBHits	PD	Int	Yds	Avg	Lng	TD	FF	FR	Yds	TD
2019	IND	16	8	65	48	17	1.0	2	1	2	0	0	0	0	0	2	1	0	0
2020	IND	14	8	72	57	15	0.0	4	1	6	1	7	7	7	0	0	2	11	0
2021	IND	17	17	132	89	43	1.0	3	2	4	2	20	10.0	16	0	0	0	0	0
2022	IND	17	16	151	99	52	0.0	6	0	5	0	0	0	0	0	2	2	0	0
2023	NYG	17	17	149	92	57	2.5	11	6	10	2	62	31.0	55	0	4	0	0	0
2024	NYG	12	12	93	47	46	2.0	6	2	3	0	0	0	0	0	3	2	1	0
2025	NYG	17	17	143	78	65	1.0	2	1	6	2	54	27	47	0	0	1	0	0
2026	CAR	7	6	49	31	18	1.0	5	2	5	1	3	3.0	3	0	1	1	0	0
Career		117	101	854	541	313	8.5	39	15	41	8	146	18.3	55	0	12	9	12	0

=== Postseason ===
Year	Team	Games		Tackles						Interceptions						Fumbles			
Year	Team	GP	GS	Cmb	Solo	Ast	Sck	TFL	QBHits	PD	Int	Yds	Avg	Lng	TD	FF	FR	Yds	TD
2020	IND	1	0	4	3	1	0.0	0	0	0	0	0	0	0	0	0	0	0	0
Career		1	0	4	3	1	0.0	0	0	0	0	0	0.0	0	0	0	0	0	0

== Controversies ==
Okereke was the subject of a sexual assault investigation at Stanford in 2015. Three members of the university's five-person investigative panel concluded Okereke committed sexual assault, but the ruling didn't cross the 4-1 threshold necessary to pursue further punitive action. Okereke has maintained that the allegations are untrue.
