= 2023 New York Giants season =

99th season in franchise history

- Owner: John Mara; Steve Tisch
- General manager: Joe Schoen
- Head coach: Brian Daboll
- Home stadium: MetLife Stadium

Results
- Record: 6–11
- Division place: 3rd NFC East
- Playoffs: Did not qualify
- All-Pros: DT Dexter Lawrence (2nd team)
- Pro Bowlers: DT Dexter Lawrence

Uniform
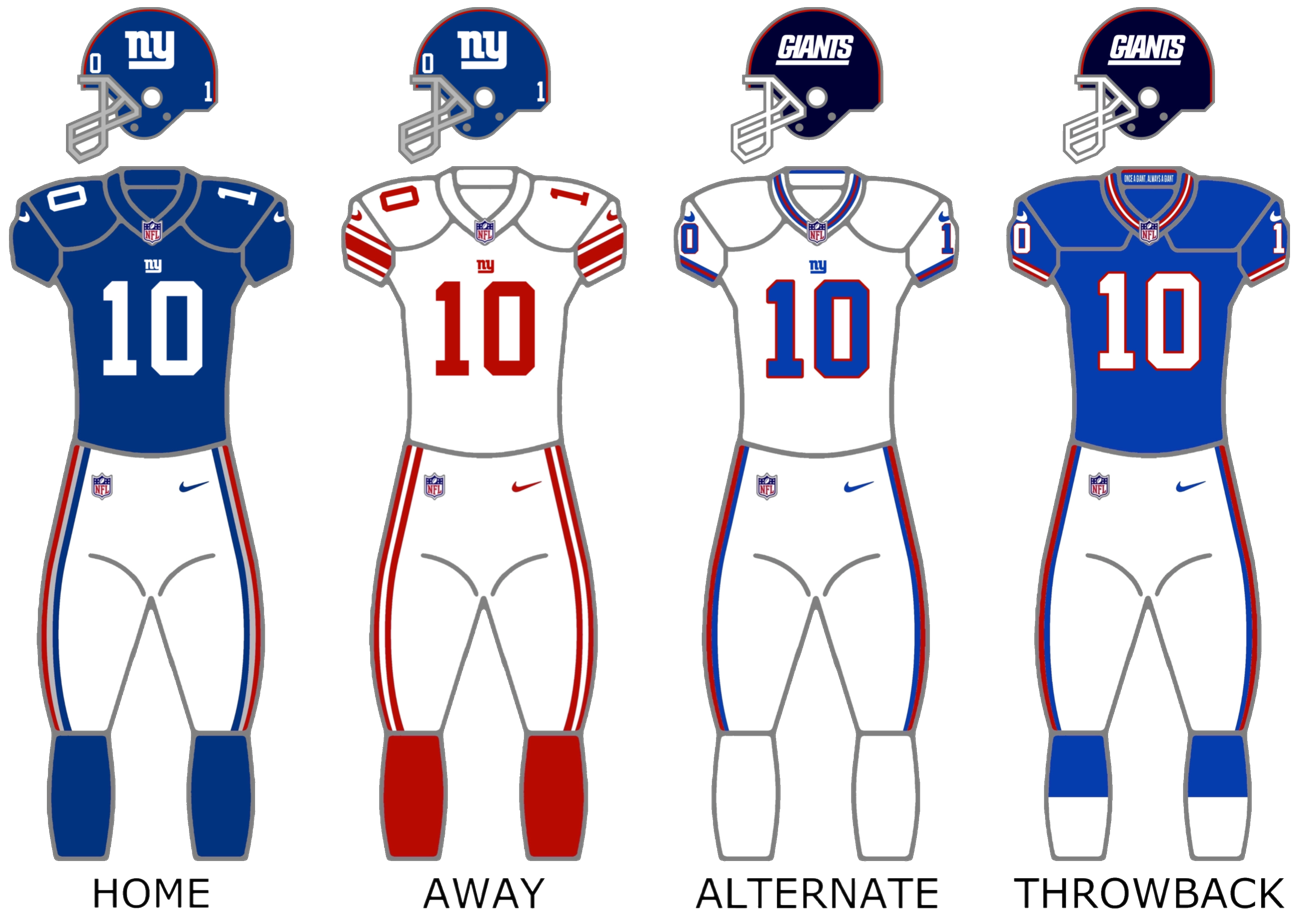

The 2023 season was the New York Giants' 99th in the National Football League (NFL) and their second under the head coach/general manager tandem of Brian Daboll and Joe Schoen. They failed to improve upon their 9–7–1 record from 2022 after a Week 10 loss to the Dallas Cowboys. Following an overtime victory by the Philadelphia Eagles over the Buffalo Bills in Week 12, the Giants were eliminated from contention for the NFC East title, extending their 11-year division title drought.

They were eliminated from playoff contention following a Christmas Day loss to the Eagles. A historically poor offensive line and numerous injuries, particularly losing starting quarterback Daniel Jones to a torn ACL in a Week 9 loss against the Raiders, plagued the team throughout the year. Their offensive line had one of the worst seasons in NFL history, allowing an abysmal 85 sacks (An average of 5 sacks per game), the second highest number of sacks allowed by a team in a single season. This was only behind the NFL record held by the 1986 Philadelphia Eagles, whose offensive line allowed 104 sacks in a 16 game regular season.

The New York Giants drew an average home attendance of 79,307 in 8 home games in the 2023 NFL season, the 2nd highest in the league.

== Offseason ==
=== Free agency ===
==== Players with the New York Giants in 2022 ====
Position	Player	Tag	Date signed	2023 team	Notes
C	Jack Anderson	ERFA	February 14		
TE	Lawrence Cager	ERFA	February 13		
G	Wyatt Davis	ERFA	March 13		
WR	Isaiah Hodgins	ERFA	February 16		1 year, $870,000
DE	Henry Mondeaux	RFA	March 27	Jacksonville Jaguars	
RB	Saquon Barkley	UFA	July 25		Non-exclusive franchise tag; 1 year, $11 million
RB	Matt Breida	UFA	March 14		1 year, $2.3 million
LB	Jarrad Davis	UFA	March 7		1 year
ILB	Landon Collins	UFA			
NT	Justin Ellis	UFA	July 28	Atlanta Falcons	1 year
C	Jon Feliciano	UFA	March 21	San Francisco 49ers	1 year
G	Nick Gates	UFA	March 16	Washington Commanders	
P	Jamie Gillan	UFA	March 13		2 years, $4 million
WR	Richie James	UFA	April 11	Kansas City Chiefs	
SS	Tony Jefferson	UFA			Retired
WR	Marcus Johnson	UFA			
QB	Daniel Jones	UFA	March 7		4 years, $160 million
LS	Casey Kreiter	UFA	March 13		
S	Julian Love	UFA	March 17	Seattle Seahawks	
CB	Fabian Moreau	UFA	August 2	Denver Broncos	1 year
WR	Sterling Shepard	UFA	March 15		1 year, $1.3 million
WR	Darius Slayton	UFA	March 20		2 years, $12 million
LB	Jaylon Smith	UFA	August 11	New Orleans Saints	
LB	Jihad Ward	UFA	March 29		
DE	Nick Williams	UFA	May 19	Los Angeles Chargers	
LB	Oshane Ximines	UFA	May 5		

Player re-signed by the Giants	Player signed by another team	Retired

==== Players with other teams in 2022 ====
Position	Player	Tag	Date signed	2022 team	Contract	Ref
WR	Parris Campbell	UFA	March 17	Indianapolis Colts	1 year, $4.7 million	
WR	Jamison Crowder	UFA	March 23	Buffalo Bills		
C	J. C. Hassenauer	UFA	April 7	Pittsburgh Steelers		
NT	Rakeem Nuñez-Roches	UFA	March 17	Tampa Bay Buccaneers		
LB	Bobby Okereke	UFA	March 16	Indianapolis Colts	4 years, $40 million	
CB	Amani Oruwariye	UFA	March 23	Detroit Lions		
DE	A'Shawn Robinson	UFA	April 24	Los Angeles Rams		
TE	Tommy Sweeney	UFA	March 23	Buffalo Bills		
WR	Jeff Smith	RFA	March 17	New York Jets		

=== Trades and other signings ===
Position	Player	Date signed	Previous team	Details
CB	Leonard Johnson	March 20		Free agent signing.
FS	Bobby McCain	March 23	Washington Commanders	Free agent signing.
TE	Darren Waller	March 15	Las Vegas Raiders	Acquired by trade.
SS	Isaiah Simmons	August 22	Arizona Cardinals	Acquired by trade.

=== Roster transactions ===
Position	Player	Date	Details
WR	Kenny Golladay	March 15	Released.

=== Draft ===
2023 New York Giants draft selections
Round	Selection	Player	Position	College	Notes
1	24	Deonte Banks	CB	Maryland	From Jaguars (Note: The Giants traded first-, fifth- and seventh-round selections (25th, 160th and 240th overall) to the Jacksonville Jaguars in exchange for a first-round selection (24th overall).)
1	25	Traded to the Jacksonville Jaguars			
2	57	John Michael Schmitz	C	Minnesota	
3	73	Jalin Hyatt	WR	Tennessee	From Browns via Texans and Rams (Note: The Giants traded third- and fourth-round selections (89th and 128th overall) to the Los Angeles Rams in exchange for a third-round selection (73rd overall).)
3	89	Traded to the Los Angeles Rams			
3	100	Traded to the Las Vegas Raiders (Note: The Giants traded a third-round selection (100th overall) to the Las Vegas Raiders in exchange for TE Darren Waller.)			2020 Resolution JC-2A pick; from Chiefs (Note: The Giants traded WR Kadarius Toney to the Kansas City Chiefs in exchange for third- and sixth-round selections (100th and 209th overall).)
4	128	Traded to the Los Angeles Rams			
5	160	Traded to the Jacksonville Jaguars			
5	172	Eric Gray	RB	Oklahoma	Compensatory pick
6	203	Traded to the Houston Texans (Note: The Giants traded a sixth-round selection (203rd overall) to the Houston Texans in exchange for CB Keion Crossen.)			
6	209	Tre Hawkins	CB	Old Dominion	From Chiefs
7	240	Traded to the Jacksonville Jaguars			From Ravens (Note: The Giants traded a 2022 fourth-round selection to the Baltimore Ravens in exchange for a seventh-round selection (240th overall), a 2022 fifth-round selection and G Ben Bredeson.)
7	243	Jordon Riley	NT	Oregon	
7	254	Gervarrius Owens	S	Houston	Compensatory pick

2023 New York Giants undrafted free agents
Name	Position	College	Ref.
Habakkuk Baldonado	DE	Pittsburgh	
Troy Brown	LB	Ole Miss	
Alex Cook	S	Washington	
Tommy DeVito	QB	Illinois	
Bryce Ford-Wheaton	WR	West Virginia	
Gemon Green	CB	Michigan	
Dyontae Johnson	LB	Toledo	
Ryan Jones	TE	East Carolina	
Cameron Lyons	LS	Charlotte	

Draft trades

== Staff ==
2023 New York Giants staff
Front office: President/CEO – John Mara; Chairman/executive vice president – Steve Tisch; Senior vice president & general manager – Joe Schoen; Assistant general manager – Brandon Brown; Senior vice president of football operations & strategy – Kevin Abrams; Senior personnel consultant – Chris Mara; Director of player personnel – Tim McDonnell; Assistant director of player personnel – Dennis Hickey; Director of pro scouting – Chris Rosetti; Director of football operations – Ed Triggs; Director of coaching operations – Laura Young; Head coaches: Head coach – Brian Daboll; Offensive coaches: Offensive coordinator – Mike Kafka; Quarterbacks – Shea Tierney; Assistant quarterbacks – Christian Jones; Running backs – Jeff Nixon; Wide receivers – Mike Groh; Tight ends – Andy Bischoff; Offensive line – Bobby Johnson; Assistant offensive line – Chris Smith; Offensive assistant – Christian Daboll; Offensive assistant – Angela Baker	Defensive coaches: Defensive coordinator – Don Martindale; Defensive line – Andre Patterson; Assistant defensive line – Bryan Cox; Outside linebackers – Drew Wilkins; Inside linebackers – John Egorugwu; Defensive backs – Jerome Henderson; Safeties – Michael Treier; Defensive assistant – Kevin Wilkins; Special teams coaches: Special teams coordinator – Thomas McGaughey; Assistant special teams – Mike Adams; Assistant special teams – Stephen Thomas; Strength and conditioning: Director of strength and performance – Craig Fitzgerald; Assistant strength and performance – Drew Wilson; Performance manager/assistant strength and performance – Sam Coad

== Final roster ==
2023 New York Giants roster
Quarterbacks (QB): 15 Tommy DeVito; 9 Jacob Eason; 2 Tyrod Taylor; Running backs (RB): 26 Saquon Barkley; 31 Matt Breida; 35 Jashaun Corbin; 20 Eric Gray; Wide receivers (WR): 0 Parris Campbell; 18 Isaiah Hodgins; 13 Jalin Hyatt; 80 Gunner Olszewski; 17 Wan'Dale Robinson; 3 Sterling Shepard; 86 Darius Slayton; Tight ends (TE): 82 Daniel Bellinger; 84 Tyree Jackson; 12 Darren Waller	Offensive linemen (OL): 68 Ben Bredeson G; 64 Mark Glowinski G; 65 Sean Harlow C; 60 Marcus McKethan G; 74 Matt Peart T; 67 Justin Pugh G; 61 John Michael Schmitz C; 78 Andrew Thomas T; Defensive linemen (DL): 98 DJ Davidson NT; 96 Timmy Horne NT; 97 Dexter Lawrence NT; 93 Rakeem Nuñez-Roches DE; 95 Jordon Riley DE; 91 A'Shawn Robinson DE	Linebackers (LB): 45 Carlos Basham Jr. OLB; 43 Darrian Beavers ILB; 47 Cam Brown ILB; 52 Carter Coughlin ILB; 41 Micah McFadden ILB; 51 Azeez Ojulari OLB; 58 Bobby Okereke ILB; 19 Isaiah Simmons ILB; 5 Kayvon Thibodeaux OLB; 55 Jihad Ward OLB; 48 Benton Whitley OLB; Defensive backs (DB): 25 Deonte Banks CB; 24 Dane Belton SS; 28 Cordale Flott CB; 37 Tre Hawkins CB; 30 Darnay Holmes CB; 22 Adoree' Jackson CB; 44 Nick McCloud CB; 29 Xavier McKinney FS; 39 Gervarrius Owens FS; Special teams (ST): 6 Jamie Gillan P; 59 Casey Kreiter LS	Practice squad: 90 Ryder Anderson DE; 72 Yodny Cajuste T; 21 Mason Crosby K; 87 Dylan Drummond WR; 94 Tomon Fox OLB; 38 Kaleb Hayes CB; 88 Dennis Houston WR; 34 Deon Jackson RB; 54 Dyontae Johnson ILB; 49 Ryan Jones TE; -- Jeremiah Martin OLB; 62 Jalen Mayfield G; 77 Joshua Miles T; 36 Stantley Thomas-Oliver CB; 99 Cade York K (PS/I); Reserve: 23 Gary Brightwell RB (IR); 46 Randy Bullock K (IR); 83 Lawrence Cager TE (IR); 57 Jarrad Davis ILB (IR); -- Wyatt Davis G (IR); 75 Joshua Ezeudu T (IR); -- Bryce Ford-Wheaton WR (IR); -- Graham Gano K (IR); 63 J. C. Hassenauer C (IR); 8 Daniel Jones QB (IR); 66 Shane Lemieux G (IR); 73 Evan Neal T (IR); 79 Tyre Phillips T (IR); 27 Jason Pinnock SS (IR); 33 Aaron Robinson CB (PUP); Rookies in italics 53 active, 15 reserve, 14 practice squad (1 exempt)

== Preseason ==
The Giants' preseason opponents and schedule was announced on May 25, 2023.

Week	Date	Opponent	Result	Record	Venue	Recap
1	August 11	at Detroit Lions	L 16–21	0–1	Ford Field	Recap
2	August 18	Carolina Panthers	W 21–19	1–1	MetLife Stadium	Recap
3	August 26	New York Jets	L 24–32	1–2	MetLife Stadium	Recap

== Regular season ==
=== Schedule ===
Week	Date	Opponent	Result	Record	Venue	Recap
1	September 10	**Dallas Cowboys**	**L** 0–40	0–1	MetLife Stadium	Recap
2	September 17	at Arizona Cardinals	**W** 31–28	1–1	State Farm Stadium	Recap
3	September 21	at San Francisco 49ers	**L** 12–30	1–2	Levi's Stadium	Recap
4	October 2	Seattle Seahawks	**L** 3–24	1–3	MetLife Stadium	Recap
5	October 8	at Miami Dolphins	**L** 16–31	1–4	Hard Rock Stadium	Recap
6	October 15	at Buffalo Bills	**L** 9–14	1–5	Highmark Stadium	Recap
7	October 22	**Washington Commanders**	**W** 14–7	2–5	MetLife Stadium	Recap
8	October 29	New York Jets	**L** 10–13 (OT)	2–6	MetLife Stadium	Recap
9	November 5	at Las Vegas Raiders	**L** 6–30	2–7	Allegiant Stadium	Recap
10	November 12	at **Dallas Cowboys**	**L** 17–49	2–8	AT&T Stadium	Recap
11	November 19	at **Washington Commanders**	**W** 31–19	3–8	FedExField	Recap
12	November 26	New England Patriots	**W** 10–7	4–8	MetLife Stadium	Recap
13	Bye					
14	December 11	Green Bay Packers	**W** 24–22	5–8	MetLife Stadium	Recap
15	December 17	at New Orleans Saints	**L** 6–24	5–9	Caesars Superdome	Recap
16	December 25	at **Philadelphia Eagles**	**L** 25–33	5–10	Lincoln Financial Field	Recap
17	December 31	Los Angeles Rams	**L** 25–26	5–11	MetLife Stadium	Recap
18	January 7	**Philadelphia Eagles**	**W** 27–10	6–11	MetLife Stadium	Recap

Note: Intra-division opponents are in bold text.

=== Game summaries ===
==== Week 1: vs. Dallas Cowboys ====
Week 1: Dallas Cowboys at New York Giants – Game summary

Quarter	1	2	3	4	Total
**Cowboys**	16	10	7	7	**40**
Giants	0	0	0	0	**0**

at MetLife Stadium, East Rutherford, New Jersey

- Date: September 10
- Game time: 8:20 p.m. EDT
- Game weather: Rain, 74 °F (23 °C)
- Game attendance: 80,809
- Referee: Adrian Hill
- TV announcers (NBC): Mike Tirico, Cris Collinsworth and Melissa Stark
- Recap, Game Book

Game information

**First quarter**

- DAL – Noah Igbinoghene 58-yard blocked field goal return (kick failed, wide left), 8:03. Cowboys 6–0.
- DAL – Brandon Aubrey 21-yard field goal, 3:21. Cowboys 9–0. **Drive: 9 plays, 72 yards, 3:45.**
- DAL – DaRon Bland 22-yard interception return (Brandon Aubrey kick), 2:22. Cowboys 16–0.

**Second quarter**

- DAL – Brandon Aubrey 38-yard field goal, 10:55. Cowboys 19–0. **Drive: 11 plays, 60 yards, 4:26.**
- DAL – Tony Pollard 2-yard rush (Brandon Aubrey kick), 8:03. Cowboys 26–0. **Drive: 5 plays, 38 yards, 2:45.**

**Third quarter**

- DAL – Tony Pollard 1-yard rush (Brandon Aubrey kick), 10:01. Cowboys 33–0. **Drive: 10 plays, 75 yards, 4:59.**

**Fourth quarter**

- DAL – KaVontae Turpin 7-yard rush (Brandon Aubrey kick), 11:31. Cowboys 40–0. **Drive: 8 plays, 50 yards, 3:29.**

**Top passers**

- DAL – Dak Prescott – 13/24, 143 yards
- NYG – Daniel Jones – 15/28, 104 yards, 2 INT

**Top rushers**

- DAL – Tony Pollard – 14 rushes, 70 yards, 2 TD
- NYG – Saquon Barkley – 12 rushes, 51 yards

**Top receivers**

- DAL – CeeDee Lamb – 4 receptions, 77 yards
- NYG – Darren Waller – 3 receptions, 36 yards

Despite showing promise by being able to run the ball effectively, the Giants opening drive ended in disaster. First, Andrew Thomas was flagged for a false start, then rookie center John Michael Schmitz snapped the ball errantly behind Daniel Jones, causing a sack, and then Graham Gano's field goal attempt was blocked, with Dallas returning it for a touchdown. This set the tone for the rest of the night as the Giants were thoroughly dominated in all three phases of the game. Jones was under duress the entire game and threw two interceptions with the first being returned for a touchdown by DaRon Bland, his first touchdown of a record-setting season.

The Giants were shut out for the first time since Week 15 of the 2018 season and this was their worst shutout loss at home since Week 1 of the 1995 season (also against Dallas) as well as their worst loss against Dallas since 1966. Additionally, this was their biggest shutout loss since 2013 when they lost 38–0 to the Carolina Panthers.

In one of the worst losses in franchise history, the Giants became the first team in NFL history to lose a game by 40+ points, get out-sacked by seven or more, lose three or more turnovers more than forced, have a blocked field goal returned for a touchdown, and throw a pick six in a single season. The Giants did all this in the same game.

==== Week 2: at Arizona Cardinals ====
Week 2: New York Giants at Arizona Cardinals – Game summary

Quarter	1	2	3	4	Total
**Giants**	0	0	14	17	**31**
Cardinals	7	13	8	0	**28**

at State Farm Stadium, Glendale, Arizona

- Date: September 17
- Game time: 4:05 p.m. EDT/1:05 p.m. MST
- Game weather: None (retractable roof closed)
- Game attendance: 62,080
- Referee: Land Clark
- TV announcers (Fox): Adam Amin, Mark Schlereth and Kristina Pink
- Recap, Game Book

Game information

**First quarter**

- ARI – James Conner 4-yard rush (Matt Prater kick), 6:11. Cardinals 7–0. **Drive: 9 plays, 86 yards, 4:41.**

**Second quarter**

- ARI – Joshua Dobbs 23-yard rush (Matt Prater kick), 14:51. Cardinals 14–0. **Drive: 7 plays, 80 yards, 3:27.**
- ARI – Matt Prater 37-yard field goal, 8:43. Cardinals 17–0. **Drive: 9 plays, 54 yards, 5:02.**
- ARI – Matt Prater 44-yard field goal, 1:09. Cardinals 20–0. **Drive: 6 plays, 8 yards, 3:11.**

**Third quarter**

- NYG – Daniel Jones 14-yard rush (Graham Gano kick), 13:43. Cardinals 20–7. **Drive: 3 plays, 75 yards, 1:17.**
- ARI – Marquise Brown 3-yard pass from Joshua Dobbs (Joshua Dobbs run), 9:34. Cardinals 28–7. **Drive: 8 plays, 75 yards, 4:09.**
- NYG – Saquon Barkley 1-yard rush (Graham Gano kick), 3:27. Cardinals 28–14. **Drive: 12 plays, 75 yards, 6:07.**

**Fourth quarter**

- NYG – Saquon Barkley 9-yard pass from Daniel Jones (Graham Gano kick), 8:51. Cardinals 28–21. **Drive: 13 plays, 80 yards, 5:50.**
- NYG – Isaiah Hodgins 11-yard pass from Daniel Jones (Graham Gano kick), 4:25. Tied 28–28. **Drive: 6 plays, 64 yards, 3:06.**
- NYG – Graham Gano 34-yard field goal, 0:19. Giants 31–28. **Drive: 8 plays, 56 yards, 2:12.**

**Top passers**

- NYG – Daniel Jones – 26/37, 321 yards, 2 TD, INT
- ARI – Joshua Dobbs – 21/31, 228 yards, TD

**Top rushers**

- NYG – Saquon Barkley – 17 rushes, 63 yards, TD
- ARI – James Conner – 23 rushes, 106 yards, TD

**Top receivers**

- NYG – Jalin Hyatt – 2 receptions, 89 yards
- ARI – Zach Ertz – 6 receptions, 56 yards

After a historically bad loss, the Giants traveled out west to take on the Cardinals. The Giants started out flat, trailing 20–0 at the half. James Conner scored on a 4-yard scamper and Joshua Dobbs was 12/16 with 146 passing yards along with 41 rushing yards and a touchdown, while the Giants only had 81 total yards of offense. Through 6 quarters, the Giants were outscored 60–0, the worst start by an NFL team since the 1978 Baltimore Colts and was their first time not scoring through the first 6 quarters since 1934.

The Giants came out firing after halftime, scoring on every drive in the second half, and outscored the Cardinals 31–8 to win the game 31–28. On the first play from scrimmage, Daniel Jones found rookie Jalin Hyatt for a 58-yard catch, his first in the NFL. Jones scored on a quarterback option two plays later, then the Cardinals responded with a touchdown and 2-point conversion to take a 28–7 lead. Jones led the Giants on a 12-play, 75-yard drive to bring the game back to two scores and galvanized the defense by forcing the Cardinals to punt for the first time in the game. Jones then led the Giants on another methodical 13-play, 80-yard drive and cashed in on a 9-yard touchdown pass to Saquon Barkley on 3rd and goal. After forcing a 3-and-out, Jones and the Giants tied the game with a touchdown pass to Isaiah Hodgins. After forcing another 3-and-out, Jones and Barkley took the Giants into field goal range and Graham Gano scored the game-winning field goal with 19 seconds remaining. The Giants tied the franchise record for the largest comeback win of 21 points, their first since 1949.

With the win, the Giants picked up their first win of the season, improving to 1–1. Daniel Jones became the first player in NFL history to throw 250+ yards, run 50+ yards, have two or more passing touchdowns, have one or more rushing touchdowns, and no turnovers in a single half.

==== Week 3: at San Francisco 49ers ====
Week 3: New York Giants at San Francisco 49ers – Game summary

Quarter	1	2	3	4	Total
Giants	3	3	6	0	**12**
**49ers**	3	14	3	10	**30**

at Levi's Stadium, Santa Clara, California

- Date: September 21
- Game time: 8:15 p.m. EDT/5:15 p.m. PDT
- Game weather: Sunny, 77 °F (25 °C)
- Game attendance: 71,593
- Referee: Shawn Hochuli
- TV announcers (WNYW/Prime Video): Al Michaels, Kirk Herbstreit and Kaylee Hartung
- Recap, Game Book

Game information

**First quarter**

- SF – Jake Moody 28-yard field goal, 8:44. 49ers 3–0. **Drive: 15 plays, 64 yards, 6:16.**
- NYG – Graham Gano 44-yard field goal, 3:18. Tied 3–3. **Drive: 12 plays, 49 yards, 5:26.**

**Second quarter**

- SF – Ronnie Bell 9-yard pass from Brock Purdy (Jake Moody kick), 7:49. 49ers 10–3. **Drive: 11 plays, 62 yards, 6:24.**
- SF – Christian McCaffrey 4-yard run (Jake Moody kick), 1:40. 49ers 17–3. **Drive: 11 plays, 73 yards, 4:33.**
- NYG – Graham Gano 57-yard field goal, 0:13. 49ers 17–6. **Drive: 8 plays, 37 yards, 1:27.**

**Third quarter**

- NYG – Matt Breida 8-yard run (pass failed), 10:00. 49ers 17–12. **Drive: 2 plays, 37 yards, 0:46.**
- SF – Jake Moody 21-yard field goal, 4:08. 49ers 20–12. **Drive: 11 plays, 72 yards, 5:52.**

**Fourth quarter**

- SF – Jake Moody 36-yard field goal, 12:47. 49ers 23–12. **Drive: 8 plays, 51 yards, 4:26.**
- SF – Deebo Samuel 27-yard pass from Brock Purdy (Jake Moody kick), 5:58. 49ers 30–12. **Drive: 8 plays, 70 yards, 5:02.**

**Top passers**

- NYG – Daniel Jones – 22/32, 137 yards, INT
- SF – Brock Purdy – 25/37, 310 yards, 2 TD

**Top rushers**

- NYG – Matt Breida – 4 rushes, 17 yards, TD
- SF – Christian McCaffrey – 18 rushes, 85 yards, TD

**Top receivers**

- NYG – Darius Slayton – 3 receptions, 32 yards
- SF – Deebo Samuel – 6 receptions, 129 yards, TD

The Giants headed into this game short-handed without Saquon Barkley and Andrew Thomas missing his 2nd straight game. The two teams traded field goals early on before the 49ers started to pull away with two more touchdown drives going into halftime.

In the second half, the Giants had their second drive start from the 37-yard line of the 49ers thanks to a 15-yard penalty due to Eric Gray being interfered with while calling for a fair catch on a punt. Three plays later after another lengthy pass interference penalty, Matt Breida ran the ball in from eight yards out, providing the only touchdown of the night for the Giants, who only trailed 20–12 after the end of the third quarter, but the 49ers pulled away in the fourth and won 30–12.

Throughout the night, the offensive line again struggled to protect Daniel Jones and the Giants could not establish any running game. The defense constantly failed to get off the field on 3rd down and had 18 missed tackles.

Daniel Jones fell to 1–11 in primetime games as the Giants lost their sixth consecutive game on Thursday Night Football dating back to 2016. Additionally, they have lost two Thanksgiving games during this span.

==== Week 4: vs. Seattle Seahawks ====
Week 4: Seattle Seahawks at New York Giants – Game summary

Quarter	1	2	3	4	Total
**Seahawks**	7	7	7	3	**24**
Giants	0	3	0	0	**3**

at MetLife Stadium, East Rutherford, New Jersey

- Date: October 2
- Game time: 8:15 p.m. EDT
- Game weather: Fair, 67 °F (19 °C)
- Game attendance: 78,507
- Referee: Brad Rogers
- TV announcers (ESPN/ABC): Joe Buck, Troy Aikman and Lisa Salters
- Recap, Game Book

Game information

**First quarter**

- SEA – D. K. Metcalf 6-yard pass from Geno Smith (Jason Myers kick), 0:00. Seahawks 7–0. **Drive: 2 plays, 7 yards, 0:45.**

**Second quarter**

- NYG – Graham Gano 55-yard field goal, 3:05. Seahawks 7–3. **Drive: 12 plays, 61 yards, 6:11.**
- SEA – Kenneth Walker III 1-yard run (Jason Myers kick), 1:39. Seahawks 14–3. **Drive: 7 plays, 75 yards, 1:26.**

**Third quarter**

- SEA – Devon Witherspoon 97-yard interception return (Jason Myers kick), 1:03. Seahawks 21–3.

**Fourth quarter**

- SEA – Jason Myers 34-yard field goal, 5:26. Seahawks 24–3. **Drive: 6 plays, 29 yards, 3:00.**

**Top passers**

- SEA – Geno Smith – 13/20, 110 yards, TD
- NYG – Daniel Jones – 27/34, 203 yards, 2 INT

**Top rushers**

- SEA – Kenneth Walker III – 17 rushes, 79 yards, TD
- NYG – Daniel Jones – 10 rushes, 66 yards

**Top receivers**

- SEA – Noah Fant – 2 receptions, 63 yards
- NYG – Matt Breida – 5 receptions, 48 yards

The Giants returned home for their Monday Night Football matchup against the Seahawks. Daniel Jones was flustered and threw two interceptions while being sacked a career-high 11 times. The first was a dagger for the Giants, a red-zone pick-six to rookie Seahawks cornerback Devon Witherspoon to make it a 3-score game.

With the loss, the Giants fell to 1–3. The Giants offensive line woes continued when rookie center John Michael Schmitz left the game with a shoulder injury.

==== Week 5: at Miami Dolphins ====
Week 5: New York Giants at Miami Dolphins – Game summary

Quarter	1	2	3	4	Total
Giants	0	10	3	3	**16**
**Dolphins**	7	10	14	0	**31**

at Hard Rock Stadium, Miami Gardens, Florida

- Date: October 8
- Game time: 1:00 p.m. EDT
- Game weather: Partly cloudy, 88 °F (31 °C)
- Game attendance: 65,654
- Referee: Ronald Torbert
- TV announcers (Fox): Kenny Albert, Jonathan Vilma and Shannon Spake
- Recap, Game Book

Game information

**First quarter**

- MIA – Jaylen Waddle 2-yard pass from Tua Tagovailoa (Jason Sanders kick), 7:09. Dolphins 7–0. **Drive: 8 plays, 89 yards, 4:18.**

**Second quarter**

- MIA – De'Von Achane 76-yard run (Jason Sanders kick), 10:02. Dolphins 14–0. **Drive: 3 plays, 94 yards, 0:58.**
- NYG – Graham Gano 49-yard field goal, 3:41. Dolphins 14–3. **Drive: 13 plays, 44 yards, 6:21.**
- NYG – Jason Pinnock 102-yard interception return (Graham Gano kick), 1:40. Dolphins 14–10.
- MIA – Jason Sanders 40-yard field goal, 0:00. Dolphins 17–10. **Drive: 9 plays, 50 yards, 1:40.**

**Third quarter**

- MIA – Tyreek Hill 69-yard pass from Tua Tagovailoa (Jason Sanders kick), 14:06. Dolphins 24–10. **Drive: 3 plays, 75 yards, 0:54.**
- NYG – Graham Gano 37-yard field goal, 4:26. Dolphins 24–13. **Drive: 4 plays, 4 yards, 2:18.**
- MIA – Raheem Mostert 2-yard run (Jason Sanders kick), 0:00. Dolphins 31–13. **Drive: 8 plays, 75 yards, 4:26.**

**Fourth quarter**

- NYG – Graham Gano 51-yard field goal, 8:51. Dolphins 31–16. **Drive: 10 plays, 18 yards, 3:54.**

**Top passers**

- NYG – Daniel Jones – 14/20, 119 yards
- MIA – Tua Tagovailoa – 22/30, 308 yards, 2 TD, 2 INT

**Top rushers**

- NYG – Eric Gray – 12 rushes, 25 yards
- MIA – De'Von Achane – 11 rushes, 151 yards, TD

**Top receivers**

- NYG – Darren Waller – 8 receptions, 86 yards
- MIA – Tyreek Hill – 8 receptions, 181 yards, TD

The Giants scored on a Jason Pinnock 102-yard interception return in the second quarter of the game, the team's first first-half touchdown of the season, to close to within 7 points of the Dolphins at half-time. However, they only managed two field goals in the second half as they failed to score an offensive touchdown for the second game in a row, and third overall, as they lost 16–31 to fall to 1–4. The season's offensive line problems continued for the Giants, with Daniel Jones being ruled out of the game midway through the fourth quarter with a neck injury sustained while being sacked for the sixth time.

==== Week 6: at Buffalo Bills ====
Week 6: New York Giants at Buffalo Bills – Game summary

Quarter	1	2	3	4	Total
Giants	3	3	0	3	**9**
**Bills**	0	0	0	14	**14**

at Highmark Stadium, Orchard Park, New York

- Date: October 15
- Game time: 8:20 p.m. EDT
- Game weather: Cloudy, 46 °F (8 °C)
- Game attendance: 70,515
- Referee: Tra Blake
- TV announcers (NBC): Mike Tirico, Cris Collinsworth and Melissa Stark
- Recap, Game Book

Game information

**First quarter**

- NYG – Graham Gano 29-yard field goal, 3:19. Giants 3–0. **Drive: 12 plays, 45 yards, 6:01.**

**Second quarter**

- NYG – Graham Gano 43-yard field goal, 5:08. Giants 6–0. **Drive: 9 plays, 34 yards, 4:36.**

**Third quarter**

- No scoring plays.

**Fourth quarter**

- BUF – Deonte Harty 3-yard pass from Josh Allen (Tyler Bass kick), 14:54. Bills 7–6. **Drive: 17 plays, 89 yards, 9:58.**
- NYG – Graham Gano 29-yard field goal, 10:35. Giants 9–7. **Drive: 9 plays, 79 yards, 4:19.**
- BUF – Quintin Morris 15-yard pass from Josh Allen (Tyler Bass kick), 3:48. Bills 14–9. **Drive: 12 plays, 75 yards, 6:47.**

**Top passers**

- NYG – Tyrod Taylor – 24/36, 200 yards,
- BUF – Josh Allen – 19/30, 169 yards, 2 TD, INT

**Top rushers**

- NYG – Saquon Barkley – 24 rushes, 93 yards
- BUF – James Cook – 14 rushes, 71 yards

**Top receivers**

- NYG – Darius Slayton – 4 receptions, 69 yards
- BUF – Stefon Diggs – 10 receptions, 100 yards

The overmatched Giants played a close game against the Bills on Sunday Night Football despite not having Daniel Jones, Andrew Thomas, and others. The Giants opened the scoring in the first quarter with a Graham Gano field goal after Bobby Okereke stripped Gabriel Davis of the football, which Micah McFadden recovered. The Bills tried to move down the field, but Tyler Bass missed a field goal wide right, which the Giants capitalized with another field goal of their own. Then, Okereke tipped a Josh Allen pass that McFadden intercepted before halftime. The Giants tried to move down the field and were on the Bills 1-yard line with 14 seconds to go and no timeouts, and starting quarterback Tyrod Taylor audibled out of two pass plays and opted to run with Saquon Barkley. The Bills stopped Barkley and the Giants went into the locker room with a 6–0 halftime lead, but failed to score on the goal line.

The Bills first drive of the second half was long and methodical, and capped it off with a Deonte Harty touchdown on the first play of the fourth quarter to take a 7–6 lead. The Giants responded with a field goal of their own to retake the lead after Barkley took them down the field, and the Bills responded with their second consecutive touchdown to take a 14–9 lead. The Giants turned the ball over on downs, then the Bills failed to put the game away when Tyler Bass missed his second field goal of the game wide right. The Giants had one timeout and drove down the field, only to find themselves on the 1-yard line again to end the game. With 2 seconds left, the referees called pass interference on the Bills for grabbing Darren Waller, giving the Giants an untimed down. On the down, Waller appeared to be held again, but no penalty was called, and the Bills won 14–9, and the Giants fell to 1–5.

The Giants ran three plays from the 1-yard line to end both halves and came away with zero points. For the third consecutive game and fourth overall, the Giants failed to score an offensive touchdown. This was also the third game overall that the Giants failed to score a single touchdown. Bobby Okereke had his best game as a Giant to date, with 11 tackles, 2 tackles for loss, 2 pass deflections, and 1 forced fumble.

==== Week 7: vs. Washington Commanders ====
Week 7: Washington Commanders at New York Giants – Game summary

Quarter	1	2	3	4	Total
Commanders	0	0	7	0	**7**
**Giants**	0	14	0	0	**14**

at MetLife Stadium, East Rutherford, New Jersey

- Date: October 22
- Game time: 1:00 p.m. EDT
- Game weather: Mostly cloudy, 54 °F (12 °C)
- Game attendance: 81,671
- Referee: John Hussey
- TV announcers (CBS): Andrew Catalon, Tiki Barber, Matt Ryan and AJ Ross
- Recap, Game Book

Game information

**First quarter**

- No scoring plays.

**Second quarter**

- NYG – Darren Waller 15-yard pass from Tyrod Taylor (Graham Gano kick), 14:18. Giants 7–0. **Drive: 8 plays, 88 yards, 4:33.**
- NYG – Saquon Barkley 32-yard pass from Tyrod Taylor (Graham Gano kick), 8:56. Giants 14–0. **Drive: 2 plays, 48 yards, 0:38.**

**Third quarter**

- WAS – Brian Robinson Jr. 4-yard run (Joey Slye kick), 10:21. Giants 14–7. **Drive: 6 plays, 21 yards, 2:48.**

**Fourth quarter**

- No scoring plays.

**Top passers**

- WAS – Sam Howell – 22/42, 249 yards, INT
- NYG – Tyrod Taylor – 18/29, 279 yards, 2 TD

**Top rushers**

- WAS – Brian Robinson Jr. – 8 rushes, 23 yards, TD
- NYG – Saquon Barkley – 21 rushes, 77 yards

**Top receivers**

- WAS – Terry McLaurin – 6 receptions, 90 yards
- NYG – Darren Waller – 7 receptions, 98 yards, TD

The Giants defense set the tone early with five first half sacks of Commanders quarterback Sam Howell. After missing a field goal on their second drive, the Giants offense started to click. Darren Waller scored his first touchdown as a Giant (also the Giants first offensive first half touchdown of the season) to open the scoring 7–0. This was the first offensive touchdown the Giants scored since Week 3 as well. After first round pick Deonte Banks had his first career interception, Tyrod Taylor threw a second touchdown pass, this time to Saquon Barkley to give the Giants a 14–0 lead they took with them in the locker room.

The Giants let the Commanders back in the game in the second half. Being forced to rely on wide receiver Sterling Shepard to return punts, Shepard fumbled a punt which the Commanders recovered and took advantage of with a Brian Robinson touchdown to make the score 14–7 Giants. Later in the third quarter, Howell was hit as he threw and Kayvon Thibodeaux had a walk-in interception touchdown, but he dropped the pass to save Washington. On the Commanders next drive, Howell connected with Terry McLaurin for 58 yards over two receptions and settled for a field goal attempt which was blocked by Leonard Williams to preserve the 7-point lead. The Giants responded by moving down the field, but Barkley fumbled in the red zone to give the ball back to Washington. On the Commanders final drive, they marched 85 yards down the field over 17 plays only to turn it over on downs. The Giants kneeled the ball knowing they would have to punt back to Washington with less than 10 seconds to play, but on the third down, Daron Payne went down with an injury, and because Washington didn't have any timeouts left, his injury reset the play clock and therefore ended the game. The Giants won 14–7 and improved to 2–5.

==== Week 8: vs. New York Jets ====
Week 8: New York Jets at New York Giants – Game summary

Quarter	1	2	3	4	OT	Total
**Jets**	7	0	0	3	3	**13**
Giants	3	0	7	0	0	**10**

at MetLife Stadium, East Rutherford, New Jersey

- Date: October 29
- Game time: 1:00 p.m. EDT
- Game weather: Rain, 51 °F (11 °C)
- Game attendance: 83,367
- Referee: Shawn Smith
- TV announcers (CBS): Andrew Catalon, Tiki Barber, Matt Ryan and AJ Ross
- Recap, Game Book

Game information

**First quarter**

- NYG – Graham Gano 31-yard field goal, 12:07. Giants 3–0. **Drive: 4 plays, 6 yards, 1:26.**
- NYJ – Breece Hall 50-yard pass from Zach Wilson (Greg Zuerlein kick), 1:06. Jets 7–3. **Drive: 1 plays, 50 yards, 0:12.**

**Second quarter**

- No scoring plays.

**Third quarter**

- NYG – Tommy DeVito 6-yard run (Graham Gano kick), 8:59. Giants 10–7. **Drive: 11 plays, 75 yards, 6:01.**

**Fourth quarter**

- NYJ – Greg Zuerlein 35-yard field goal, 0:00. Tied 10–10. **Drive: 4 plays, 58 yards, 0:24.**

**Overtime**

- NYJ – Greg Zuerlein 33-yard field goal, 6:09. Jets 13–10. **Drive: 6 plays, 46 yards, 2:02.**

**Top passers**

- NYJ – Zach Wilson – 17/36, 240 yards, TD
- NYG – Tyrod Taylor – 4/7, 8 yards

**Top rushers**

- NYJ – Zach Wilson – 4 rushes, 25 yards
- NYG – Saquon Barkley – 36 rushes, 128 yards

**Top receivers**

- NYJ – Garrett Wilson – 7 receptions, 100 yards
- NYG – Darren Waller - 1 reception, 4 yards

The Jets won 13–10 in overtime to defeat the Giants for the third time in succession.

Kayvon Thibodeaux strip-sacked Jets quarterback Zach Wilson on the opening drive of the game, but the Giants had to settle for a field goal after going three-and-out. Offensive production then became elusive for both teams, with the teams combining for 15 punts, 8 first downs, and 204 total yards of offense, with 50 of those yards coming via a Breece Hall screen pass taken to the end zone for a Jets touchdown. Both teams suffered numerous injuries, the most consequential of which being to Giants quarterback Tyrod Taylor, who was knocked out of the game with a rib injury and taken to a hospital for further evaluation. The Jets led 7–3 at halftime.

Local and undrafted rookie Tommy DeVito took over for Taylor as the Giants quarterback in the second quarter, after which the Giants offense resorted almost exclusively to running the ball. Saquon Barkley sparked the Giants offense on the opening drive of the third quarter with a 34-yard run that DeVito capped off with a 6-yard touchdown run, his first in the NFL. Over the next 9 drives, the teams combined for 8 punts, 7 first downs, and 114 yards of total offense. On that 9th drive, the Giants maintained a 10–7 lead, but the Jets had the ball with less than 2:00 remaining in the fourth quarter. On 4th down, Thibodeaux sacked Wilson to give the Giants the ball in prime scoring territory. After going three-and-out, Graham Gano missed a 35-yard field goal with 24 seconds remaining. It was Gano's second miss of the game. It was later revealed that Gano was suffering from a knee injury to his standing (left) leg that would require offseason surgery.

On the first play of the Jets drive, Wilson connected with wide receiver Garrett Wilson for 29 yards with 17 seconds remaining. On the next play, Wilson connected with wide receiver Allen Lazard over the middle for another 29 yard gain over. With no timeouts, the Jets sprinted to the line and spiked the ball to stop the clock with 1 second left. Jets kicker Greg Zuerlein made the 35-yard field goal to send the game to overtime.

The Giants won the coin toss but couldn't move the ball with DeVito being forced to pass and punted to the Jets. On the Jets drive, Adoree Jackson committed a defensive pass interference foul on 3rd down to put the Jets in field goal range. On the next play, Zuerlein made a 33-yard field goal and won the game for the Jets, who at one point had just a 0.1% chance to win.

The Giants finished the game with -9 passing yards, which was the worst finish by an NFL team since 2021 (coincidentally by the Giants). Saquon Barkley had 128 rushing yards for the Giants and Garrett Wilson had 7 receptions for 100 receiving yards for the Jets. Kayvon Thibodeaux had 9 tackles and 3 sacks for the Giants, and brought his sack total to 8.5 on the season in a tie for third in the NFL. C.J. Mosley, Quincy Williams, and Tony Adams all had 10+ tackles for the Jets.

The Jets won their third game in a row and improved to 4–3, while the Giants fell to 2–6.

==== Week 9: at Las Vegas Raiders ====
Week 9: New York Giants at Las Vegas Raiders – Game summary

Quarter	1	2	3	4	Total
Giants	0	0	0	6	**6**
**Raiders**	7	17	3	3	**30**

at Allegiant Stadium, Paradise, Nevada

- Date: November 5
- Game time: 4:25 p.m. EST/1:25 p.m. PST
- Game weather: None (indoor stadium)
- Game attendance: 62,082
- Referee: Alan Eck
- TV announcers (Fox): Kevin Kugler, Mark Sanchez and Laura Okmin
- Recap, Game Book

Game information

**First quarter**

- LV – Jakobi Meyers 17-yard run (Daniel Carlson kick), 9:45. Raiders 7–0. **Drive: 6 plays, 67 yards, 3:50.**

**Second quarter**

- LV – Josh Jacobs 2-yard run (Daniel Carlson kick), 5:06. Raiders 14–0. **Drive: 8 plays, 65 yards, 4:02.**
- LV – Josh Jacobs 1-yard run (Daniel Carlson kick), 1:57. Raiders 21–0. **Drive: 4 plays, 60 yards, 1:39.**
- LV – Daniel Carlson 24-yard field goal, 0:04. Raiders 24–0. **Drive: 6 plays, 20 yards, 1:41.**

**Third quarter**

- NYG – Wan'Dale Robinson 9-yard pass from Tommy DeVito (pass failed), 14:11. Raiders 27–6. **Drive: 11 plays, 84 yards, 5:53.**

**Fourth quarter**

- LV – Daniel Carlson 41-yard field goal, 9:29. Raiders 30–6. **Drive: 4 plays, 5 yards, 0:53.**

**Top passers**

- NYG – Tommy DeVito – 15/20, 175 yards, TD, 2 INT
- LV – Aidan O'Connell – 16/25, 209 yards

**Top rushers**

- NYG – Saquon Barkley – 16 rushes, 90 yards
- LV – Josh Jacobs – 26 rushes, 98 yards, 2 TD

**Top receivers**

- NYG – Darius Slayton – 4 receptions, 59 yards
- LV – Davante Adams - 4 reception, 34 yards

Daniel Jones returned to action for the first time since Week 5, but tore his ACL on a non-contact play to begin the second quarter and was replaced by Tommy DeVito. In their first game after firing Josh McDaniels, the Raiders were dominant and played with new life under interim coach Antonio Pierce, a former Giant and Super Bowl XLII champion.

DeVito threw his first career touchdown pass to Wan'Dale Robinson early in the fourth quarter and was named the starter the next week against the Cowboys. Jones was ruled out for the rest of the season.

==== Week 10: at Dallas Cowboys ====
Week 10: New York Giants at Dallas Cowboys – Game summary

Quarter	1	2	3	4	Total
Giants	0	0	7	10	**17**
**Cowboys**	7	21	14	7	**49**

at AT&T Stadium, Arlington, Texas

- Date: November 12
- Game time: 4:25 p.m. EST/3:25 p.m. CST
- Game weather: None (retractable roof closed)
- Game attendance: 93,338
- Referee: Brad Rogers
- TV announcers (Fox): Kevin Burkhardt, Greg Olsen, Erin Andrews and Tom Rinaldi
- Recap, Game Book

Game information

**First quarter**

- DAL – CeeDee Lamb 14-yard run (Brandon Aubrey kick), 3:38. Cowboys 7–0. **Drive: 5 plays, 46 yards, 1:41.**

**Second quarter**

- DAL – Jake Ferguson 1-yard pass from Dak Prescott (Brandon Aubrey kick), 8:48. Cowboys 14–0. **Drive: 8 plays, 96 yards, 4:35.**
- DAL – Brandin Cooks 10-yard pass from Dak Prescott (Brandon Aubrey kick), 3:48. Cowboys 21–0. **Drive: 6 plays, 54 yards, 2:48.**
- DAL – Dak Prescott 10-yard run (Brandon Aubrey kick), 0:16. Cowboys 28–0. **Drive: 7 plays, 85 yards, 2:31.**

**Third quarter**

- NYG – Lawrence Cager 10-yard pass from Tommy DeVito (Randy Bullock kick), 8:07. Cowboys 28–7. **Drive: 7 plays, 91 yards, 3:29.**
- DAL – Michael Gallup 41-yard pass from Dak Prescott (Brandon Aubrey kick), 4:40. Cowboys 35–7. **Drive: 6 plays, 86 yards, 3:27.**
- DAL – CeeDee Lamb 12-yard run (Brandon Aubrey kick), 1:29. Cowboys 42–7. **Drive: 8 plays, 77 yards, 3:04.**

**Fourth quarter**

- NYG – Randy Bullock 40-yard field goal, 8:54. Cowboys 42–10. **Drive: 5 plays, 5 yards, 2:02.**
- DAL – Rico Dowdle 1-yard run (Brandon Aubrey kick), 2:14. Cowboys 49–10. **Drive: 11 plays, 75 yards, 6:40.**
- NYG – Sterling Shepard 2-yard pass from Tommy DeVito (Randy Bullock kick), 0:06. Cowboys 49–17. **Drive: 14 plays, 75 yards, 2:08.**

**Top passers**

- NYG – Tommy DeVito – 14/27, 86 yards, 2 TD, INT
- DAL – Dak Prescott – 26/35, 404 yards, 4 TD, INT

**Top rushers**

- NYG – Saquon Barkley – 13 rushes, 66 yards
- DAL – Rico Dowdle – 12 rushes, 79 yards, TD

**Top receivers**

- NYG – Darius Slayton – 3 receptions, 21 yards
- DAL – CeeDee Lamb – 11 receptions, 151 yards, TD

In Tommy DeVito's first start, the Giants trailed 28–0 at halftime and lost 49–17. They were outscored 89–17 against the Cowboys in two games, and suffered two of their worst three losses to the Cowboys in franchise history in 2023.

==== Week 11: at Washington Commanders ====
Week 11: New York Giants at Washington Commanders – Game summary

Quarter	1	2	3	4	Total
**Giants**	7	7	0	17	**31**
Commanders	3	6	3	7	**19**

at FedExField, Landover, Maryland

- Date: November 19
- Game time: 1:00 p.m. EST
- Game weather: Sunny, 56 °F (13 °C)
- Game attendance: 62,714
- Referee: Brad Allen
- TV announcers (Fox): Kenny Albert, Jonathan Vilma and Shannon Spake
- Recap, Game Book

Game information

**First quarter**

- NYG – Saquon Barkley 24-yard pass from Tommy DeVito (Randy Bullock kick), 6:29. Giants 7–0. **Drive: 4 plays, 45 yards, 1:10.**
- WAS – Joey Slye 23-yard field goal, 2:12. Giants 7–3. **Drive: 9 plays, 70 yards, 4:17.**

**Second quarter**

- NYG – Darius Slayton 40-yard pass from Tommy DeVito (Randy Bullock kick), 5:58. Giants 14–3. **Drive: 6 plays, 62 yards, 2:45.**
- WAS – Sam Howell 7-yard run (kick failed), 1:32. Giants 14–9. **Drive: 12 plays, 75 yards, 4:26.**

**Third quarter**

- WAS – Joey Slye 42-yard field goal, 5:43. Giants 14–12. **Drive: 13 plays, 68 yards, 7:37.**

**Fourth quarter**

- NYG – Saquon Barkley 5-yard pass from Tommy DeVito (Randy Bullock kick), 13:32. Giants 21–12. **Drive: 5 plays, 68 yards, 2:10.**
- NYG – Randy Bullock 36-yard field goal, 6:48. Giants 24–12. **Drive: 7 plays, 46 yards, 4:23.**
- WAS – Jahan Dotson 8-yard pass from Sam Howell (Joey Slye kick), 2:16. Giants 24–19. **Drive: 12 plays, 75 yards, 4:32.**
- NYG – Isaiah Simmons 54-yard interception return (Randy Bullock kick), 0:16. Giants 31–19.

**Top passers**

- NYG – Tommy DeVito – 18/26, 246 yards, 3 TD
- WAS – Sam Howell – 31/45, 255 yards, TD, 3 INT

**Top rushers**

- NYG – Saquon Barkley – 14 rushes, 83 yards
- WAS – Brian Robinson Jr. – 17 rushes, 73 yards

**Top receivers**

- NYG – Darius Slayton – 4 receptions, 82 yards, TD
- WAS – Logan Thomas – 5 receptions, 58 yards

The Giants' defense forced six turnovers, which included three fumbles, and three interceptions by Sam Howell, with the last turnover sealing the victory with a pick-six by Isaiah Simmons. The Giants swept Washington for the first time since 2020, and moved to 3–8.

This was Tommy DeVito's first win in the NFL and despite getting sacked 9 times in the game, he was named the Rookie of the Week for his performance throwing 246 yards, 3 touchdown passes, and no turnovers.

Kayvon Thibodeaux's dominance against the Commanders continued, finishing with 5 tackles, 2 sacks, 1 pass breakup and 3 quarterback hits. He became the first player under a Wink Martindale led defense to have 10+ sacks in a single season, and accomplished the feat in 11 games.

==== Week 12: vs. New England Patriots ====
Week 12: New England Patriots at New York Giants – Game summary

Quarter	1	2	3	4	Total
Patriots	0	0	7	0	**7**
**Giants**	0	7	0	3	**10**

at MetLife Stadium, East Rutherford, New Jersey

- Date: November 26
- Game time: 1:00 p.m. EST
- Game weather: Mostly cloudy, 43 °F (6 °C)
- Game attendance: 82,211
- Referee: Scott Novak
- TV announcers (Fox): Kenny Albert, Jonathan Vilma and Shannon Spake
- Recap, Game Book

Game information

**First quarter**

- No scoring plays.

**Second quarter**

- NYG – Isaiah Hodgins 12-yard pass from Tommy DeVito (Randy Bullock kick), 1:53. Giants 7–0. **Drive: 6 plays, 26 yards, 2:34.**

**Third quarter**

- NE – Rhamondre Stevenson 7-yard run (Chad Ryland kick), 8:02. Tied 7–7. **Drive: 11 plays, 60 yards, 6:58.**

**Fourth quarter**

- NYG – Randy Bullock 42-yard field goal, 8:10. Giants 10–7. **Drive: 7 plays, 8 yards, 4:21.**

**Top passers**

- NE – Mac Jones – 12/21, 89 yards, 2 INT
- NYG – Tommy DeVito – 17/25, 191 yards, TD

**Top rushers**

- NE – Rhamondre Stevenson – 21 rushes, 98 yards, TD
- NYG – Saquon Barkley – 12 rushes, 46 yards

**Top receivers**

- NE – Demario Douglas – 6 receptions, 49 yards
- NYG – Jalin Hyatt – 5 receptions, 109 yards

With the Patriots driving in the second quarter, Mac Jones threw his second interception to Bobby Okereke, who returned it 55 yards and set up an Isaiah Hodgins touchdown before halftime to give the Giants a 7–0 lead. Bill Belichick benched Jones with Bailey Zappe for the second time in as many games, and the Patriots began the third quarter with an opening drive touchdown by Rhamondre Stevenson to tie the game. In the fourth quarter, Zappe threw an interception to Xavier McKinney to set up a Randy Bullock field goal to give the Giants a 10–7 lead. The Patriots started their final drive at midfield and moved the ball in the red zone to set up a game-tying field goal attempt by Chad Ryland, but Ryland pulled the 35-yarder wide left. The Giants improved to 4–8 and had their first winning streak of the 2023 season heading into the bye week.

Jalin Hyatt had 5 receptions for 109 yards, including the only three plays of 20+ yards by either team in the game. He was named the Rookie of the Week for his performance, the second Giant to win the award in as many weeks.

==== Week 14: vs. Green Bay Packers ====
Week 14: Green Bay Packers at New York Giants – Game summary

Quarter	1	2	3	4	Total
Packers	7	3	3	9	**22**
**Giants**	0	7	14	3	**24**

at MetLife Stadium, East Rutherford, New Jersey

- Date: December 11
- Game time: 8:15 p.m. EST
- Game weather: Overcast, 39 °F (4 °C)
- Game attendance: 76,637
- Referee: Land Clark
- TV announcers (ABC): Joe Buck, Troy Aikman and Lisa Salters
- Recap, Game Book

Game information

**First quarter**

- GB – Jayden Reed 16-yard run (Anders Carlson kick), 1:01. Packers 7–0. **Drive: 7 plays, 62 yards, 3:51.**

**Second quarter**

- NYG – Saquon Barkley 5-yard run (Randy Bullock kick), 11:55. Tied 7–7. **Drive: 8 plays, 75 yards, 4:06.**
- GB – Anders Carlson 36-yard field goal. Packers 10–7. **Drive: 10 plays, 65 yards, 2:32.**

**Third quarter**

- NYG – Saquon Barkley 1-yard run (Randy Bullock kick), 11:22. Giants 14–10. **Drive: 3 plays, 31 yards, 1:30.**
- GB – Anders Carlson 32-yard field goal, 7:31. Giants 14–13. **Drive: 4 plays, 0 yards, 1:34.**
- NYG – Isaiah Hodgins 8-yard pass from Tommy DeVito (Randy Bullock kick), 1:28. Giants 21–13. **Drive: 10 plays, 75 yards, 6:03.**

**Fourth quarter**

- GB – Anders Carlson 48-yard field goal, 5:30. Giants 21–16. **Drive: 7 plays, 54 yards, 3:29.**
- GB – Malik Heath 6-yard pass from Jordan Love (run failed), 1:33. Packers 22–21. **Drive: 9 plays, 36 yards, 2:01.**
- NYG – Randy Bullock 37-yard field goal, 0:00. Giants 24–22. **Drive: 8 plays, 57 yards, 1:33.**

**Top passers**

- GB – Jordan Love – 25/39, 218 yards, TD, INT
- NYG – Tommy DeVito – 17/21, 158 yards, TD

**Top rushers**

- GB – A. J. Dillon – 15 rushes, 53 yards
- NYG – Saquon Barkley – 20 rushes, 86 yards, 2 TD

**Top receivers**

- GB – Tucker Kraft – 4 receptions, 64 yards
- NYG – Wan'Dale Robinson – 6 receptions, 79 yards

Late in the first quarter, Packers wide receiver Dontayvion Wicks appeared to be short of the line to gain on a 4th and 1, but the referees overturned their initial call and awarded the Packers a first down. Jayden Reed scored a touchdown two plays later for Green Bay, but a long gain on a Wan'Dale Robinson end-around set up a Saquon Barkley touchdown to tie the game 7–7. The Giants defense forced two turnovers of Packers quarterback Jordan Love, but failed to capitalize on them and the Packers had a 10–7 halftime lead.

The Giants recovered a muffed punt and Barkley capitalized with his second touchdown run of the day to give the Giants a 14–10 third quarter lead. The Packers recovered a Giants fumble on a punt later in the quarter but had to settle for field goal. Tommy DeVito led the Giants on another touchdown drive to take a 21–13 lead at the end of the third quarter, this time with a pass to Isaiah Hodgins.

The Giants defense held the Packers in the red zone for a third time and the Packers again had to settle for another field goal to make the score 21–16 midway through the fourth quarter. The Giants sought an opportunity to run out the clock, and Barkley broke a run deep into Packers territory and broke out of a tackle, but tripped up and lost the ball after falling to the ground. Because he reestablished his footing, wasn't giving himself up when he fell, and was never touched down, the play was ruled a fumble and the Packers returned it 50 yards amidst the confusion deep into Giants territory. The Packers regained the lead after a 9-play drive when Love found Malik Heath for his first career touchdown. The two-point conversion attempt failed, but the Packers had a 22–21 lead with 1:33 to play. On the fourth play of the ensuing drive, DeVito found Robinson for a 32-yard gain to put the Giants in field goal range, and kicker Randy Bullock scored the game-winning field goal as time expired. The Giants won their third game in a row 24–22 and improved to 5–8.

This was the first Giants primetime win at MetLife Stadium since 2016, as well as the first Giants win on Monday Night Football since 2018. Tommy DeVito was named the NFC Player of the Week for his performance.

==== Week 15: at New Orleans Saints ====
Week 15: New York Giants at New Orleans Saints – Game summary

Quarter	1	2	3	4	Total
Giants	3	3	0	0	**6**
**Saints**	7	0	10	7	**24**

at Caesars Superdome, New Orleans, Louisiana

- Date: December 17
- Game time: 1:00 p.m. EST/12:00 p.m. CST
- Game weather: None (indoor stadium)
- Game attendance: 70,038
- Referee: Carl Cheffers
- TV announcers (Fox): Kenny Albert, Jonathan Vilma and Shannon Spake
- Recap, Game Book

Game information

**First quarter**

- NYG – Randy Bullock 56-yard field goal, 10:00. Giants 3–0. **Drive: 9 plays, 37 yards, 5:00.**
- NO – Keith Kirkwood 7-yard pass from Derek Carr (Blake Grupe kick), 0:29. Saints 7–3. **Drive: 11 plays, 68 yards, 6:35.**

**Second quarter**

- NYG – Jamie Gillan 40-yard field goal, 0:00. Saints 7–6. **Drive: 13 plays, 39 yards, 2:55.**

**Third quarter**

- NO – Juwan Johnson 23-yard pass from Derek Carr (Blake Grupe kick), 8:39. Saints 14–6. **Drive: 10 plays, 68 yards, 6:21.**
- NO – Blake Grupe 50-yard field goal, 4:17. Saints 17–6. **Drive: 5 plays, 25 yards, 2:03.**

**Fourth quarter**

- NO – Jimmy Graham 1-yard pass from Derek Carr (Blake Grupe kick), 10:47. Saints 24–6. **Drive: 11 plays, 65 yards, 7:02.**

**Top passers**

- NYG – Tommy DeVito – 20/34, 177 yards
- NO – Derek Carr – 23/28, 218 yards, 3 TD

**Top rushers**

- NYG – Tommy DeVito – 4 rushes, 36 yards
- NO – Alvin Kamara – 16 rushes, 66 yards

**Top receivers**

- NYG – Darius Slayton – 4 receptions, 63 yards
- NO – Alvin Kamara – 5 receptions, 44 yards

Tommy DeVito was sacked 7 times and the Giants offense failed to muster any momentum in a game they sorely needed to win. The Saints scored on their first 3 possessions of the second half to put the game out of reach.

Kicker Randy Bullock was injured in the loss, and punter Jamie Gillan made his first NFL field goal on the last play of the second quarter.

==== Week 16: at Philadelphia Eagles ====
Christmas Day games

Week 16: New York Giants at Philadelphia Eagles – Game summary

Quarter	1	2	3	4	Total
Giants	3	0	15	7	**25**
**Eagles**	7	13	0	13	**33**

at Lincoln Financial Field, Philadelphia, Pennsylvania

- Date: December 25
- Game time: 4:30 p.m. EST
- Game weather: Cloudy, 51 °F (11 °C)
- Game attendance: 69,879
- Referee: Ronald Torbert
- TV announcers (Fox): Joe Davis, Daryl Johnston and Pam Oliver
- Recap, Game Book

Game information

**First quarter**

- PHI - Jalen Hurts 1-yard run (Jake Elliott kick), 12:27. Eagles 7–0. **Drive: 2 plays, 13 yards, 0:47.**
- NYG - Mason Crosby 52-yard field goal, 8:04. Eagles 7–3. **Drive: 10 plays, 41 yards, 4:23.**

**Second quarter**

- PHI - Jake Elliott 28-yard field goal, 14:53. Eagles 10–3. **Drive: 18 plays, 72 yards, 8:11.**
- PHI - DeVonta Smith 36-yard pass from Jalen Hurts (Jake Elliott kick), 11:44. Eagles 17–3. **Drive: 3 plays, 52 yards, 1:08.**
- PHI - Jake Elliott 21-yard field goal, 0:00. Eagles 20–3. **Drive: 11 plays, 72 yards, 2:47.**

**Third quarter**

- NYG - Saquon Barkley 7-yard run (Mason Crosby kick), 13:41. Eagles 20–10. **Drive: 3 plays, 14 yards, 1:14.**
- NYG - Adoree Jackson 76-yard interception return (Saquon Barkley run), 0:09. Eagles 20–18. **Drive: 14 plays, 66 yards, 7:26.**

**Fourth quarter**

- PHI - D'Andre Swift 5-yard run (Jake Elliott kick), 11:07. Eagles 27–18. **Drive: 8 plays, 75 yards, 4:02.**
- PHI - Jake Elliott 44-yard field goal, 6:04. Eagles 30–18. **Drive: 7 plays, 32 yards, 2:46.**
- NYG - Darius Slayton 69-yard pass from Tyrod Taylor (Mason Crosby kick), 5:22. Eagles 30–25. **Drive: 2 plays, 75 yards, 0:42.**
- PHI - Jake Elliott 43-yard field goal, 1:10. Eagles 33–25. **Drive: 9 plays, 50 yards, 4:12.**

**Top passers**

- NYG - Tyrod Taylor - 7/16, 133 yards, TD, INT
- PHI - Jalen Hurts - 24/38, 301 yards, TD, INT

**Top rushers**

- NYG - Saquon Barkley - 23 carries, 80 yards, TD
- PHI - D'Andre Swift - 20 carries, 92 yards, TD

**Top receivers**

- NYG - Darius Slayton - 3 receptions, 90 yards, TD
- PHI - A. J. Brown - 6 receptions, 80 yards

The Giants played their first-ever game on Christmas Day in their 99-year history and became the 25th NFL team to do so. The Eagles dominated every facet of the first half and coasted to a 17–3 lead. Late in the second quarter and needing a touchdown, Saquon Barkley was stopped in Philadelphia territory on a 4th & 1, then the Eagles tried to extend their lead before halftime. Jalen Hurts scrambled for a gain and failed to get out of bounds with no timeouts left, but Bobby Okereke was controversially flagged for a defensive delay of game penalty which stopped the clock for the Eagles. Jake Elliott kicked a chip shot field goal to give the Eagles a 20–3 halftime lead.

The Giants benched Tommy DeVito at halftime for Tyrod Taylor, who immediately led the Giants on a quick touchdown drive after Boston Scott fumbled the opening kickoff when he collided into Olamide Zaccheaus. Trailing 20–10 with the football on a 4th & 4, the Giants thought the Eagles jumped offsides, but Center John Michael Schmitz was flagged for a false start by bobbing his head, another controversial call that benefitted the Eagles and gave them the ball back instead of an automatic first down for the Giants. On the next drive, Hurts threw an interception to Adoree Jackson, who returned it for a touchdown. Saquon Barkley scored the 2-point conversion to trim the deficit to 20–18 after three quarters.

On the next Eagles drive, Hurts converted a 3rd & 20 to A. J. Brown, sparking the Eagles on another touchdown drive. On the Giants next drive, Taylor failed to complete a pass to a wide open Darren Waller which would have likely given the Giants a touchdown, and then failed to convert on 4th down. After the Eagles tacked on another field goal, Taylor hit Darius Slayton on a 69-yard touchdown pass to make the score 30–25 and give the Giants life on their next possession, but the Eagles kicked another field goal on their next drive to make it 33–25 with 1:10 to play. The Giants got the ball last without any timeouts and failed to score and extend the game, following an interception in the end zone. The Eagles won 33–25 and took over 1st place in the NFC East. The Giants fell to 5–10, were eliminated from playoff contention, and lost in Philadelphia for the 10th year in a row.

==== Week 17: vs. Los Angeles Rams ====
Week 17: Los Angeles Rams at New York Giants – Game summary

Quarter	1	2	3	4	Total
**Rams**	7	7	6	6	**26**
Giants	0	10	6	9	**25**

at MetLife Stadium, East Rutherford, New Jersey

- Date: December 31
- Game time: 1:00 p.m. EST
- Game weather: Overcast, 41 °F (5 °C)
- Game attendance: 75,517
- Referee: Tra Blake
- TV announcers (Fox): Kevin Kugler, Mark Sanchez and Laura Okmin
- Recap, Game Book

Game information

**First quarter**

- LAR – Kyren Williams 4-yard run (Lucas Havrisik kick), 3:07. Rams 7–0. **Drive: 8 plays, 72 yards, 4:27.**

**Second quarter**

- NYG – Wan'Dale Robinson 24-yard run (Mason Crosby kick), 13:03. Tied 7–7. **Drive: 9 plays, 75 yards, 5:04.**
- LAR – Cooper Kupp 5-yard pass from Matthew Stafford (Lucas Havrisik kick), 1:44. Rams 14–7. **Drive: 8 plays, 46 yards, 3:18.**
- NYG – Mason Crosby 31-yard field goal, 0:00. Rams 14–10. **Drive: 5 plays, 30 yards, 0:58.**

**Third quarter**

- LAR – Kyren Williams 2-yard run (kick failed), 10:17. Rams 20–10. **Drive: 4 plays, 88 yards, 1:19.**
- NYG – Darius Slayton 80-yard pass from Tyrod Taylor (kick failed), 4:39. Rams 20–16. **Drive: 4 plays, 91 yards, 1:51.**

**Fourth quarter**

- NYG – Mason Crosby 32-yard field goal, 13:24. Rams 20–19. **Drive: 10 plays, 21 yards, 3:48.**
- LAR – Kyren Williams 28-yard run (kick failed), 12:03. Rams 26–19. **Drive: 3 plays, 75 yards, 1:21.**
- NYG – Gunner Olszewski 94-yard punt return (pass failed), 3:27. Rams 26–25.

**Top passers**

- LAR – Matthew Stafford – 24/34, 317 yards, TD, 2 INT
- NYG – Tyrod Taylor – 27/41, 319 yards, TD, INT

**Top rushers**

- LAR – Kyren Williams – 20 rushes, 87 yards, 3 TD
- NYG – Tyrod Taylor – 6 rushes, 40 yards

**Top receivers**

- LAR – Puka Nacua – 5 receptions, 116 yards
- NYG – Darius Slayton – 4 receptions, 106 yards

The Giants ended the 2023 calendar year with another loss on the final play of the game, their fourth of the season.

The game was even throughout. Both defenses started the game trading stops before the offenses traded touchdowns on the next two possessions, then both teams committed turnovers and scored once more before halftime, with the Rams leading 14–10.

The Rams appeared to take control early in the third quarter when Puka Nacua took a pass play for 80 yards down to the Giants 2-yard line to set up a touchdown, but Darius Slayton took an 80-yard pass play of his own to the house for a Giants touchdown. Both kickers missed their respective extra points and the Rams led 20–16 after three quarters. The Giants settled for field goal to make the score 20–19, but the Rams struck back quickly with a 28-yard touchdown run by Kyren Williams, his third of the game.

Late in the fourth with the Rams leading 26–19, Gunner Olszewski returned a punt 94 yards for a Giants touchdown, becoming the first Giants punt returner to score a touchdown since Dwayne Harris in 2015. Brian Daboll opted to go for the lead with the two-point conversion and called a play-action pass to Saquon Barkley rolling right. The play was executed perfectly, and Barkley was wide open in point blank range, but Tyrod Taylor inexplicably missed the pass, so the Giants had to kick it back to the Rams trailing 26–25. After the defense made a stop, Taylor drove the Giants into field goal range without any timeouts, but Mason Crosby missed the 54-yard game-winning kick and the Rams survived.

Slayton and Nacua each eclipsed 100 yards receiving for the Giants and Rams, with 106 and 118 respectively, and Williams finished with three touchdowns on 87 yards rushing for the Rams. Dane Belton had his best game as a pro and finished with three takeaways (two interceptions and one fumble recovery) for the Giants. Gunner Olszewski was named the NFC Special Teams Player of the Week.

==== Week 18: vs. Philadelphia Eagles ====
Week 18: Philadelphia Eagles at New York Giants – Game summary

Quarter	1	2	3	4	Total
Eagles	0	0	3	7	**10**
**Giants**	3	21	0	3	**27**

at MetLife Stadium, East Rutherford, New Jersey

- Date: January 7
- Game time: 4:25 p.m. EST
- Game weather: Overcast, 36 °F (2 °C)
- Game attendance: 75,740
- Referee: Craig Wrolstad
- TV announcers (CBS): Ian Eagle, Charles Davis and Evan Washburn
- Recap, Game Book

Game information

**First quarter**

- NYG – Mason Crosby 24-yard field goal, 6:57. Giants 3–0. **Drive: 9 plays, 67 yards, 4:06.**

**Second quarter**

- NYG – Saquon Barkley 2-yard run (Mason Crosby kick), 9:42. Giants 10–0. **Drive: 9 plays, 48 yards, 4:28.**
- NYG – Saquon Barkley 3-yard run (Mason Crosby kick), 5:13. Giants 17–0. **Drive: 6 plays, 55 yards, 2:53.**
- NYG – Darius Slayton 19-yard pass from Tyrod Taylor (Mason Crosby kick), 1:53. Giants 24–0. **Drive: 4 plays, 73 yards, 1:09.**

**Third quarter**

- PHI – Jake Elliott 36-yard field goal, 1:15. Giants 24–3. **Drive: 13 plays, 66 yards, 4:52.**

**Fourth quarter**

- PHI – Quez Watkins 16-yard pass from Marcus Mariota (Jake Elliott kick), 10:21. Giants 24–10. **Drive: 8 plays, 81 yards, 3:29.**
- NYG – Mason Crosby 21-yard field goal, 3:42. Giants 27–10. **Drive: 12 plays, 72 yards, 6:36.**

**Top passers**

- PHI – Marcus Mariota – 13/20, 148 yards, TD, INT
- NYG – Tyrod Taylor – 23/32, 297 yards, TD, INT

**Top rushers**

- PHI – Kenneth Gainwell – 7 rushes, 62 yards
- NYG – Saquon Barkley – 18 rushes, 46 yards, 2 TD

**Top receivers**

- PHI – Quez Watkins – 8 receptions, 93 yards, TD
- NYG – Wan'Dale Robinson – 5 receptions, 85 yards

The Giants scored 21 points in the second quarter, with Saquon Barkley scoring 2 touchdowns and Darius Slayton tacking on one more. The Giants defeated the Eagles 27–10 to end the season. They finished 6–11 and secured the #6 pick in the 2024 NFL draft.

This would turn out to be Barkley's final game as a Giant, as he signed a 3-year contract in the offseason (with Philadelphia coincidentally), worth almost $38 million.

=== Standings ===
==== Division ====
NFC East
	W	L	T	PCT	DIV	CONF	PF	PA	STK
^{(2)} Dallas Cowboys	12	5	0	.706	5–1	9–3	509	315	W2
^{(5)} Philadelphia Eagles	11	6	0	.647	4–2	7–5	433	428	L2
New York Giants	6	11	0	.353	3–3	5–7	266	407	W1
Washington Commanders	4	13	0	.235	0–6	2–10	329	518	L8

==== Conference ====
NFC
#	Team	Division	W	L	T	PCT	DIV	CONF	SOS	SOV	STK
**Division leaders**
1 (Note: San Francisco finished ahead of Dallas and Detroit based on conference record, claiming the No. 1 seed.)	San Francisco 49ers	West	12	5	0	.706	5–1	10–2	.509	.475	L1
2 (Note: Dallas claimed the No. 2 seed over Detroit based on head-to-head victory.)	Dallas Cowboys	East	12	5	0	.706	5–1	9–3	.446	.392	W2
3	Detroit Lions	North	12	5	0	.706	4–2	8–4	.481	.436	W1
4 (Note: Tampa Bay finished ahead of New Orleans in the NFC South based on common record. (Tampa Bay is 8–4 against Minnesota, Chicago, Detroit, Green Bay, Atlanta, Carolina, Houston, Tennessee, Jacksonville, and Indianapolis, while New Orleans is 6–6 against the same teams.))	Tampa Bay Buccaneers	South	9	8	0	.529	4–2	7–5	.481	.379	W1
**Wild cards**
5	Philadelphia Eagles	East	11	6	0	.647	4–2	7–5	.481	.476	L2
6	Los Angeles Rams	West	10	7	0	.588	5–1	8–4	.529	.453	W4
7 (Note: Green Bay and Seattle finished ahead of New Orleans based on conference record.) (Note: Green Bay finished ahead of Seattle based on strength of victory, claiming the 7th and final playoff spot.)	Green Bay Packers	North	9	8	0	.529	4–2	7–5	.474	.458	W3
**Did not qualify for the postseason**
8	Seattle Seahawks	West	9	8	0	.529	2–4	7–5	.512	.392	W1
9	New Orleans Saints	South	9	8	0	.529	4–2	6–6	.433	.340	W2
10 (Note: Minnesota finished ahead of Atlanta based on head-to-head victory. Division tie break was initially used to eliminate Chicago (see below).) (Note: Minnesota finished ahead of Chicago based on common record. (Minnesota is 5–7 against Tampa Bay, Los Angeles Chargers, Carolina, Kansas City, Green Bay, Atlanta, New Orleans, Denver, Las Vegas, and Detroit, while Chicago is 4–8 against the same teams.))	Minnesota Vikings	North	7	10	0	.412	2–4	6–6	.509	.454	L4
11 (Note: Chicago finished ahead of Atlanta based on head-to-head victory.)	Chicago Bears	North	7	10	0	.412	2–4	6–6	.464	.370	L1
12	Atlanta Falcons	South	7	10	0	.412	3–3	4–8	.429	.462	L2
13	New York Giants	East	6	11	0	.353	3–3	5–7	.512	.353	W1
14 (Note: Washington finished ahead of Arizona based on head-to-head victory.)	Washington Commanders	East	4	13	0	.235	0–6	2–10	.512	.338	L8
15	Arizona Cardinals	West	4	13	0	.235	0–6	3–9	.561	.588	L1
16	Carolina Panthers	South	2	15	0	.118	1–5	1–11	.522	.500	L3
**Tiebreakers** (Note: When breaking ties for three or more teams under the NFL's rules, they are first broken within divisions, then comparing only the highest-ranked remaining team from each division.)

== Regular season statistical leaders ==
	Player(s)	Value	NFL Rank	NFC Rank
Passing yards	Tyrod Taylor	1,341 Yards	35th	17th
Passing touchdowns	Tommy DeVito	8 TDs	31st	17th
Rushing yards	Saquon Barkley	962 Yards	16th	9th
Rushing touchdowns	Saquon Barkley	6 TDs	T-19th	T-8th
Receptions	Wan'Dale Robinson	60 Receptions	T-55th	T-30th
Receiving yards	Darius Slayton	770 Yards	46th	24th
Receiving touchdowns	Saquon Barkley & Darius Slayton	4 TDs	54th	29th
Points	Saquon Barkley	62 Points	T-50th	T-26th
Kickoff Return Yards	Parris Campbell	191 Yards	28th	15th
Punt return Yards	Gunner Olszewski	273 Yards	11th	8th
Tackles	Bobby Okereke	149 Tackles	9th	3rd
Sacks	Kayvon Thibodeaux	11.5 Sacks	T-12th	T-4th
Interceptions	Xavier McKinney	3 INTs	T-25th	T-13th
