= Kayvon Thibodeaux =

American football player (born 2000)

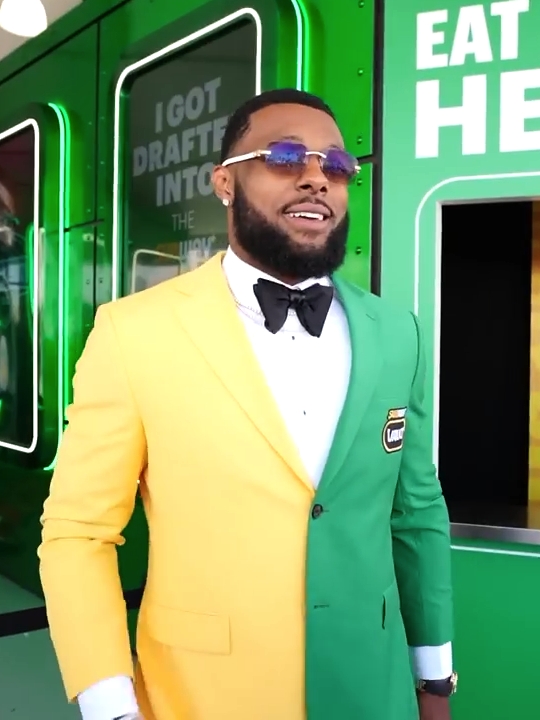
- Thibodeaux in 2022

No. 5 – New York Giants
- Position: Outside linebacker
- Roster status: Active

Personal information
- Born: December 15, 2000 (age 25); South Los Angeles, California, U.S.
- Listed height: 6 ft 5 in (1.96 m)
- Listed weight: 258 lb (117 kg)

Career information
- High school: Oaks Christian (Westlake Village, California)
- College: Oregon (2019–2021)
- NFL draft: 2022: 1st round, 5th overall pick

Career history
- New York Giants (2022–present)

Awards and highlights
- PFWA All-Rookie Team (2022); Unanimous All-American (2021); 2× first-team All-Pac-12 (2020, 2021); Pac-12 Defensive Freshman of the Year (2019)

Career NFL statistics as of Week 7, 2026
- Total tackles: 167
- Sacks: 23.5
- Forced fumbles: 6
- Fumble recoveries: 3
- Pass deflections: 13
- Defensive touchdowns: 1
- Stats at Pro Football Reference

Kayvon Thibodeaux (/ˈtɪbədoʊ/ TIB-ə-doh; born December 15, 2000) is an American professional football outside linebacker for the New York Giants of the National Football League (NFL). A native of Los Angeles, he was named USA Today's High School Football Defensive Player of the Year in 2018.

Thibodeaux played college football for the Oregon Ducks, where he was named the Pac-12 Defensive Freshman of the Year in 2019, won the Morris Trophy in 2020, and was voted a unanimous All-American in 2021. He was selected by the Giants fifth overall in the 2022 NFL draft.

== Early life ==
Thibodeaux was born in South Los Angeles, California, on December 15, 2000. He attended and played football at Susan Miller Dorsey High School for two years before transferring to Oaks Christian School in 2017. He was named the High School Football Defensive Player of the Year by the USA Today after recording 18 sacks and 54 tackles during his senior season in 2018.

Thibodeaux recorded 152 total tackles, 54 sacks, and eight forced fumbles during his high school career, and was the second-highest rated overall player in the 2019 recruiting class. He accepted a scholarship to play college football for the Ducks at the University of Oregon over several other offers including USC and Stanford.

== College career ==
Thibodeaux was named the Pac-12 Defensive Freshman of the Year in 2019. As a sophomore, he won the Morris Trophy on defense and was named first-team All-Pac-12 while also winning MVP honors of the 2020 Pac-12 Football Championship Game. Thibodeaux suffered a sprained ankle in the first game of his junior season, and sat out the following two games. He recorded seven sacks in 2021 and was unanimously voted to the 2021 College Football All-America Team. Following the season, Thibodeaux announced that he would forgo his senior year and declared for the 2022 NFL draft.

== Professional career ==
Pre-draft measurables
| Height | Weight | Arm length | Hand span | Wingspan | 40-yard dash | 10-yard split | 20-yard split | 20-yard shuttle | Three-cone drill | Broad jump | Bench press |
|---|---|---|---|---|---|---|---|---|---|---|---|
| 6 ft 4 in (1.93 m) | 254 lb (115 kg) | 33 1/8 in (0.84 m) | 9 3/4 in (0.25 m) | 6 ft 7 1/2 in (2.02 m) | 4.58 s | 1.56 s | 2.64 s | 4.38 s | 7.23 s | 9 ft 11 in (3.02 m) | 27 reps |
All values from NFL Combine/Pro Day

=== 2022 ===
Thibodeaux was selected fifth overall by the New York Giants in the 2022 NFL Draft. Thibodeaux suffered a sprained MCL in Week 2 of the preseason against the Cincinnati Bengals.

Thibodeaux made his NFL debut against the Dallas Cowboys in Week 3, where he had one tackle in the 23–16 loss. In week 6 against the Baltimore Ravens, Thibodeaux had his first career sack, forcing a game-winning fumble by quarterback Lamar Jackson in the fourth quarter during the 24–20 win. On December 18, 2022, against the Washington Commanders, Thibodeaux completed a forced fumble and recovery for his first career touchdown. His performance earned him the NFC Defensive Player of the Week for Week 15.

In Week 17, Thibodeaux sacked Indianapolis Colts quarterback Nick Foles. Despite Foles writhing on the ground with a rib injury, Thibodeaux could be seen celebrating the sack by pretending to make snow angels. As Foles was being carted off the field, Thibodeaux could be seen mimicking Foles "going to sleep." Despite being neither flagged nor fined, fans, analysts and Colts players widely criticized Thibodeaux's celebration as disrespectful and unsportsmanlike.

Thibodeaux started and appeared in 14 games as a rookie. He finished with four sacks, 49 total tackles, five passes defended, and two forced fumbles. He was named to the 2022 PFWA All-Rookie Team.

=== 2023 ===
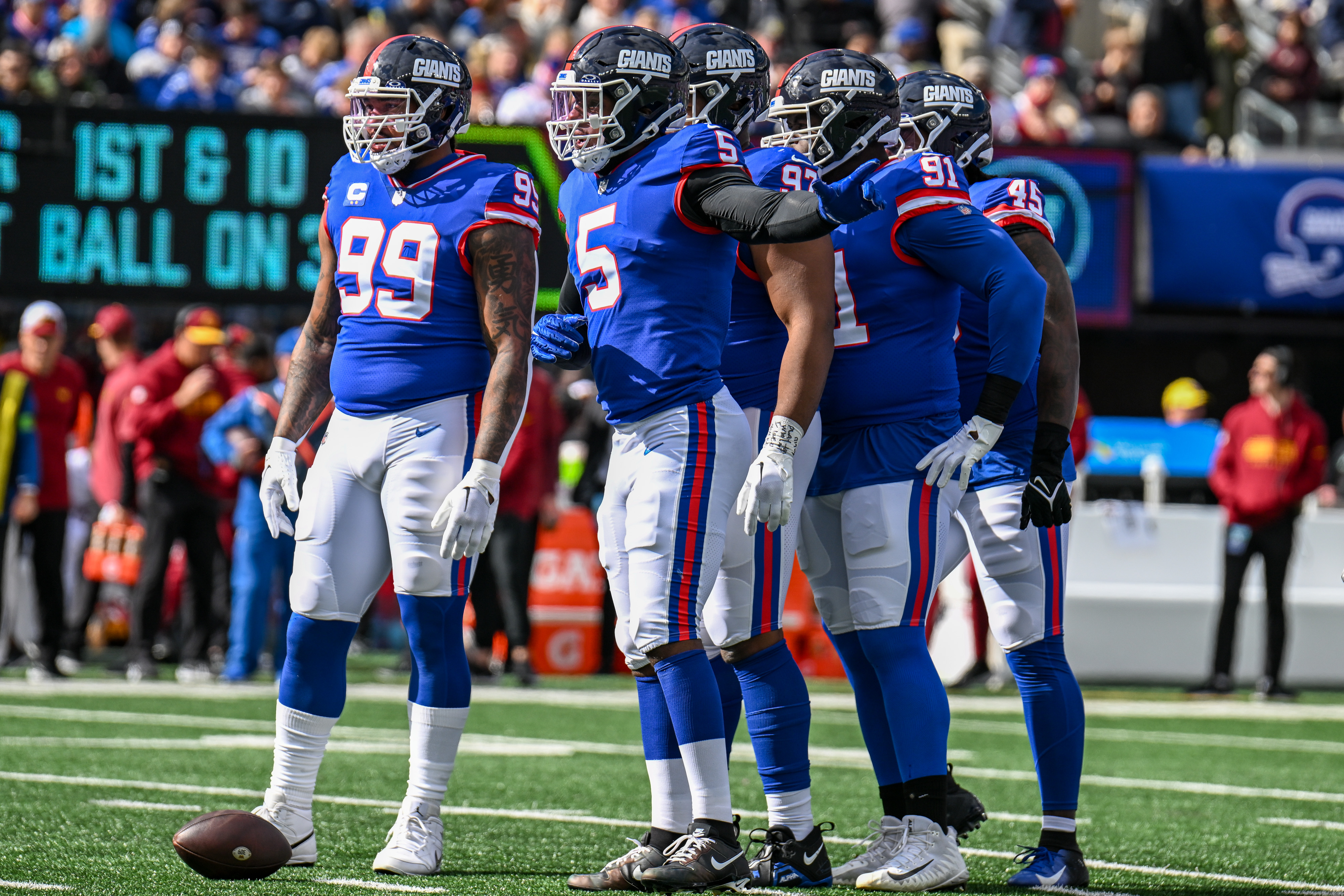
Thibodeaux (#5) playing for the Giants in 2023.

In Week 8 against the New York Jets, Thibodeaux recorded three sacks, a forced fumble, and nine tackles in the 13–10 loss in overtime.

During a Week 14 game against the Green Bay Packers, Thibodeaux recorded a forced fumble on Packers quarterback Jordan Love.

In his second season, Thibodeaux finished with 11.5 sacks, three forced fumbles, four pass deflections, and a fumble recovery.

=== 2024 ===
Thibodeaux suffered a wrist injury that required surgery in Week 5 of the 2024 season and was placed on injured reserve on October 12, 2024. He was activated on November 23.

In Week 17 against the Indianapolis Colts, Thibodeaux recorded a strip sack of quarterback Joe Flacco. The ball was recovered by the Giants, allowing them to run down the clock and win the game, while simultaneously eliminating the Colts from the playoffs. He finished the 2024 season with 5.5 sacks, 28 total tackles (14 solo), and two passes defended.

=== 2025 ===
On April 25, 2025, the Giants exercised the fifth-year option of Thibodeaux's contract. He had a down year in 2025, recording only 2.5 sacks and 25 tackles through 10 games. On December 20, Thibodeaux was placed on season-ending injured reserve due to a shoulder injury.

== Career statistics ==
Legend
| **Bold** | Career high |

=== Regular season ===
| Year | Team | Games | | Tackles | | | | | Fumbles | | | | Interceptions | | | | |
| Year | Team | GP | GS | Cmb | Solo | Ast | TFL | Sck | FF | FR | Yds | TD | Int | Yds | Lng | TD | PD |
|---|---|---|---|---|---|---|---|---|---|---|---|---|---|---|---|---|---|
| 2022 | NYG | 14 | 14 | 49 | **33** | 16 | 6 | 4.0 | 2 | **2** | **1** | **1** | 0 | 0 | 0 | 0 | **5** |
| 2023 | NYG | 17 | 17 | **50** | 26 | **24** | **12** | **11.5** | **3** | 1 | 0 | 0 | 0 | 0 | 0 | 0 | 4 |
| 2024 | NYG | 12 | 12 | 28 | 14 | 14 | 8 | 5.5 | 1 | 0 | 0 | 0 | 0 | 0 | 0 | 0 | 2 |
| 2025 | NYG | 10 | 10 | 25 | 13 | 12 | 5 | 2.5 | 0 | 0 | 0 | 0 | 0 | 0 | 0 | 0 | 2 |
| Career | | 53 | 53 | 152 | 86 | 66 | 31 | 23.5 | 6 | 3 | 1 | 1 | 0 | 0 | 0 | 0 | 13 |

=== Postseason ===
| Year | Team | Games | | Tackles | | | | | Fumbles | | | | Interceptions | | | | |
| Year | Team | GP | GS | Cmb | Solo | Ast | TFL | Sck | FF | FR | Yds | TD | Int | Yds | Lng | TD | PD |
|---|---|---|---|---|---|---|---|---|---|---|---|---|---|---|---|---|---|
| 2022 | NYG | 2 | 2 | 11 | 7 | 4 | 0 | 0.0 | 0 | 0 | 0 | 0 | 0 | 0 | 0 | 0 | 0 |
| Career | | 2 | 2 | 11 | 7 | 4 | 0 | 0.0 | 0 | 0 | 0 | 0 | 0 | 0 | 0 | 0 | 0 |

=== College ===
| Season | GP | Tackles | | | | | Interceptions | | | | | Fumbles | | | |
| Season | GP | Solo | Ast | Cmb | TfL | Sck | Int | Yds | Avg | TD | PD | FR | Yds | TD | FF |
|---|---|---|---|---|---|---|---|---|---|---|---|---|---|---|---|
| 2019 | 13 | 24 | 11 | 35 | **14** | **9.0** | 0 | 0 | 0.0 | 0 | **3** | 0 | 0 | 0 | 1 |
| 2020 | 7 | 25 | **17** | 42 | 9 | 3.0 | 0 | 0 | 0.0 | 0 | **3** | 0 | 0 | 0 | 0 |
| 2021 | 10 | **35** | 14 | **49** | 12 | 7.0 | 0 | 0 | 0.0 | 0 | 1 | 0 | 0 | 0 | **2** |
| Career | 30 | 84 | 42 | 126 | 35.5 | 19.0 | 0 | 0 | 0.0 | 0 | 7 | 0 | 0 | 0 | 3 |

== Personal life ==
In July 2021, Thibodeaux announced a collaboration with Nike CEO Phil Knight and shoe designer Tinker Hatfield to design non-fungible token (NFT) artwork. He launched his own cryptocurrency, "$JREAM", in September 2021. It was named after the Jream Foundation, which Thibodeaux also founded. Thibodeaux graduated from the University of Oregon with a degree in journalism-advertising.

Thibodeaux is an avid chess player, saying he used chess principles to hone his skills as a football player. He began playing chess at a young age, watching his uncles play the board game. Playing online chess became a passion for him. He was selected as a player for Chess.com's BlitzChamp tournament, a rapid tournament for NFL players. Thibodeaux is also a minority owner of the New York Warriors USA Masters T10 cricket team.
