= Tommy DeVito (American football) =

American football player (born 1998)

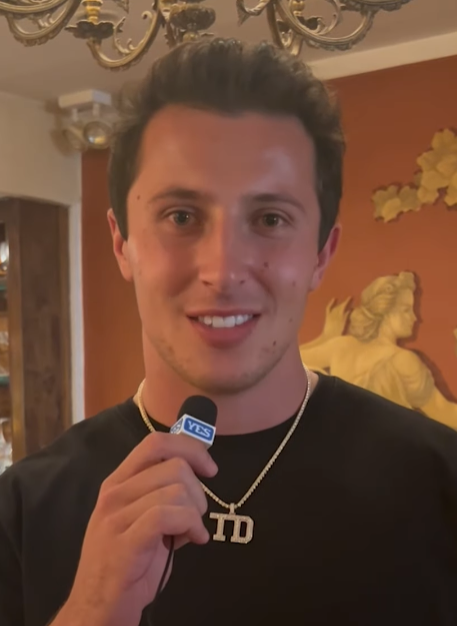
- DeVito in 2024

No. 16 – New England Patriots
- Position: Quarterback
- Roster status: Active

Personal information
- Born: August 7, 1998 (age 28); Livingston, New Jersey, U.S.
- Listed height: 6 ft 2 in (1.88 m)
- Listed weight: 210 lb (95 kg)

Career information
- High school: Don Bosco Prep (Ramsey, New Jersey)
- College: Syracuse (2017–2021); Illinois (2022)
- NFL draft: 2023: undrafted

Career history
- New York Giants (2023–2024); New England Patriots (2025–present)

Career NFL statistics as of Week 10, 2026
- Passing attempts: 254
- Passing completions: 161
- Completion percentage: 63.4%
- TD–INT: 9–4
- Passing yards: 1,490
- Passer rating: 84.6
- Stats at Pro Football Reference

Thomas Nicholas DeVito Jr. (born August 7, 1998) is an American professional football quarterback for the New England Patriots of the National Football League (NFL). He played his first five seasons of college football with the Syracuse Orange and his last with the Illinois Fighting Illini. DeVito signed with the New York Giants as an undrafted free agent in 2023. He joined the Patriots in 2025. He is known for embracing his Italian heritage and for his nicknamed "Tommy Cutlets" and "Tommy Two Chains".

== Early life ==
Born in Livingston, New Jersey, DeVito grew up in nearby Cedar Grove and attended Don Bosco Preparatory High School. He was named first team All-State by MSG and second team All-Metro after passing for 1,800 yards and 18 touchdowns in his junior season as the Ironmen went 9–3 and won the Non-Public 4 state championship. Following his junior year, DeVito competed in the Elite 11 quarterback competition and was named a finalist. As a senior, he passed for 2,005 yards, 16 touchdowns and five interceptions and played in the Under Armour All-American Game. DeVito committed to play college football at Syracuse at the end of his junior year.

== College career ==
=== Syracuse ===
==== 2018 season ====
DeVito redshirted his true freshman season. He served mostly as the backup to starting quarterback Eric Dungey as a redshirt freshman, playing in eight games off the bench and completing 44 of 87 passes for 525 yards and four touchdowns. DeVito's first significant action came on September 15, 2018, against the Florida State Seminoles, entering the game after Dungey suffered an injury and completing 11 of 16 passes for 144 yards and a touchdown while also rushing for a touchdown as the Orange won 30–7. DeVito again played in relief of an injured Dungey on October 10 against the North Carolina Tar Heels, and he led Syracuse to a 40–37 win in double overtime, throwing for 181 yards with three touchdowns and one interception on 11-for-19 passing.

==== 2019 season ====
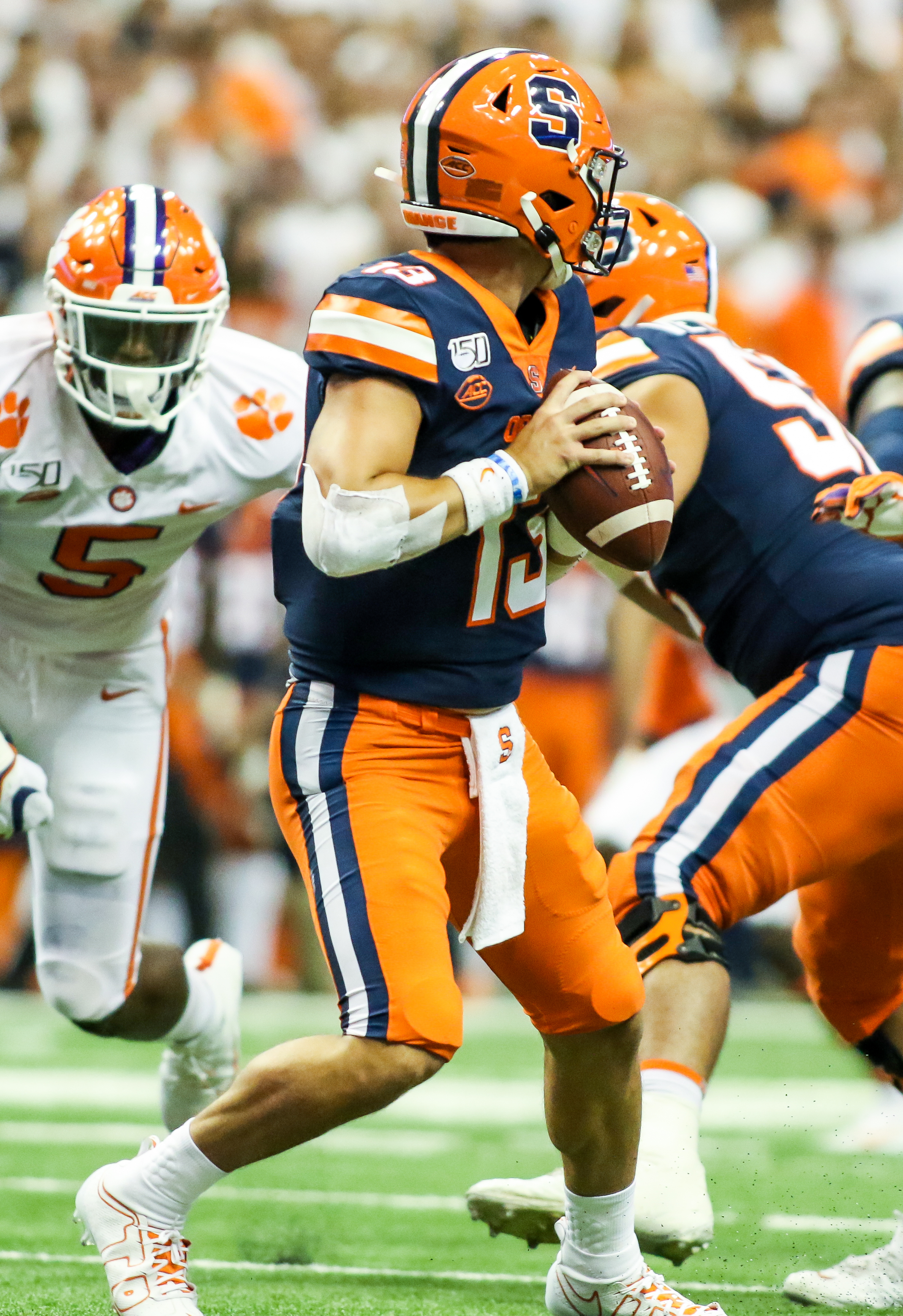
DeVito with the Syracuse Orange in 2019

As a redshirt sophomore, DeVito passed for 2,360 yards and 19 touchdowns and rushed for 122 yards and two touchdowns. He passed for a career-high 330 yards, three touchdowns and an interception in a 63–20 loss to the Maryland Terrapins.

==== 2020 season ====
In 2020, DeVito completed 48-of-96 pass attempts for 593 yards and four touchdowns through the first four games of the season before suffering a season-ending leg injury against Duke.

==== 2021 season ====
Entering his fifth year at Syracuse, all with Babers as head coach, DeVito was compared to a franchise quarterback for Syracuse with the two having an intimate and trusting relationship. DeVito began his redshirt senior season as Syracuse's starter, but coach Dino Babers also planned to give meaningful playing time to Garrett Shrader, a dual-threat quarterback who had transferred in from Mississippi State University.

DeVito played most of the season opener against the Ohio Bobcats, a 29–9 win, completing 11 of 17 passes for 92 yards and added 47 yards and a touchdown on the ground. The following week, Syracuse lost the home opener against the Rutgers Scarlet Knights 17–7, with DeVito completing 15 of 25 passing attempts for 149 yards and one interception, five sacks, and one fumble, in split time with Shrader. DeVito mentioned in a postgame interview he knew Babers planned to play both quarterbacks during the game. Babers also told the media both quarterbacks would play in the third game against the Albany Great Danes; and that he planned to make a final decision on the starter based on that game. DeVito was defiant in a press conference before the Albany game, responding, "I've done exactly what I've needed to" when asked if he thought he had earned the starting spot, while also describing how defenses had caught onto the run-pass option (RPO) offense Syracuse was running, and thus it had become a more difficult system to run in the years since Jimmy Garoppolo ran the offense for Babers at Eastern Illinois University to great success.

DeVito entered the NCAA transfer portal six weeks into the season.

=== Illinois ===
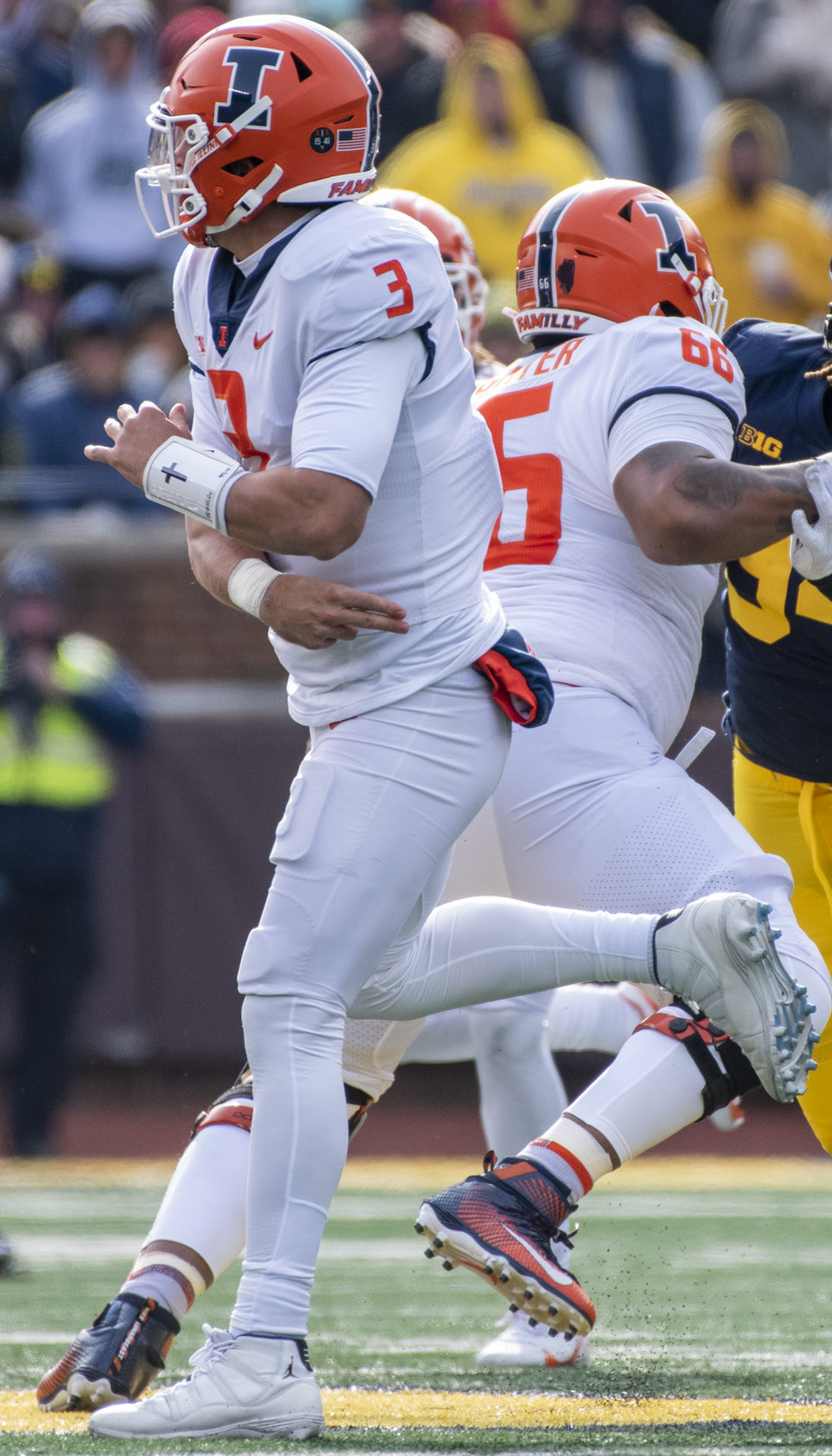
Devito with the Illinois Fighting Illini in 2022

DeVito ultimately transferred to Illinois. He was named the Fighting Illini's starting quarterback during fall practices. On October 1, against the Wisconsin Badgers, DeVito had three rushing touchdowns in the 34–10 victory. In the 2022 season, DeVito passed for 2,650 yards, 15 touchdowns, and four interceptions to go along with six rushing touchdowns. DeVito sought a waiver for an additional year of eligibility from the NCAA to play another season at Illinois, but was denied.

=== College statistics ===
Season	Team	Games		Passing								Rushing			
Season	Team	GP	Record	Cmp	Att	Pct	Yds	Avg	TD	Int	Rtg	Att	Yds	Avg	TD
2017	Syracuse	DNP													
2018	Syracuse	7	—	44	87	50.6	525	6.0	4	3	109.5	23	−17	−0.7	1
2019	Syracuse	12	4–7	213	337	63.2	2,360	7.0	19	5	137.7	112	122	1.1	2
2020	Syracuse	4	1–3	48	96	50.0	593	6.2	4	2	111.5	43	23	0.5	0
2021	Syracuse	3	2–1	32	52	61.5	388	7.5	1	2	122.9	21	90	4.3	1
2022	Illinois	13	8–5	257	369	69.6	2,650	7.2	15	4	141.2	73	35	0.5	6
Career		39	15–16	594	941	63.1	6,516	6.9	43	16	133.0	272	253	0.9	10

== Professional career ==
Pre-draft measurables
Height	Weight	Arm length	Hand span	Wingspan	40-yard dash	10-yard split	20-yard split	20-yard shuttle	Vertical jump	Broad jump
6 ft 1 in (1.85 m)	210 lb (95 kg)	29 7/8 in (0.76 m)	10 1/8 in (0.26 m)	6 ft 1 3/8 in (1.86 m)	4.66 s	1.63 s	2.71 s	4.36 s	33.0 in (0.84 m)	9 ft 6 in (2.90 m)
All values from Pro Day

=== New York Giants ===
==== 2023 ====
DeVito was signed by the New York Giants as an undrafted free agent on April 29, 2023, shortly after the conclusion of the 2023 NFL draft. DeVito was waived on August 29 and re-signed to the practice squad the following day.

In Week 8, DeVito made his NFL debut against the New York Jets, after an injury to second-string quarterback Tyrod Taylor. DeVito completed 2-of-7 pass attempts and was sacked twice, but scored the Giants' only touchdown on a six-yard run. DeVito was signed to the Giants' active roster on October 31. In Week 9, he entered the game against the Las Vegas Raiders in relief of an injured Daniel Jones and threw for 175 yards and his first NFL passing touchdown, as well as two interceptions. In Week 10, with Jones suffering from a torn ACL, head coach Brian Daboll named DeVito the starting quarterback against the Dallas Cowboys. DeVito threw for 86 yards, two touchdowns, and one interception in a 49–17 loss. In Week 11, DeVito started against the Washington Commanders. He completed 18-of-26 pass attempts for 246 yards and three touchdowns, as well as being sacked nine times. The Giants won 31–19, making DeVito the first winning quarterback to be sacked nine times or more in a game since 1992. In Week 12, DeVito started in a 10–7 victory against the New England Patriots. He completed 17-of-25 pass attempts for 191 yards with one touchdown.

Following their bye week, DeVito led the Giants to their third consecutive victory, defeating the Green Bay Packers 24–22. DeVito went 17-for-21 passes and 158 passing yards, throwing one touchdown with no interceptions, and rushed for 71 yards on 10 carries. Taking possession with less than two minutes on the clock, DeVito went 4-for-4 driving his team down the field for the winning field goal by Randy Bullock as time expired. DeVito was named NFC Offensive Player of the Week for his performance. After a 24–6 loss to the New Orleans Saints, coupled with a lackluster performance in Week 16, DeVito was benched at halftime in favor of Tyrod Taylor. In the Week 16 game against the Philadelphia Eagles, DeVito completed 9-of-16 passes for 55 yards as the Giants trailed 20–3. Taylor was later named the starter for the remainder of the season.

As the season progressed, DeVito quickly became a fan favorite, both for going from an undrafted third-string rookie quarterback and leading an underachieving Giants' team to some surprising success, and for being openly proud of his Italian heritage. He was given the nickname "Tommy Cutlets" in reference to his Italian heritage and from mentioning that, by living at home with his parents, he doesn't have to worry about "what I'm eating for dinner, chicken cutlets." His Boston-rooted agent Sean P. Stellato also received major attention in December 2023 after television cameras cut to Stellato, dressed in a black suit with a gold chain and a fedora while he was pinching his fingers as DeVito’s father, Tom and planted a kiss on his cheek.

DeVito won the Bud Light Celebration of the Year award at the 13th NFL Honors.

==== 2024 ====
DeVito opened the season as the third-string quarterback behind Daniel Jones and Drew Lock. After a 2–8 start to the season, the Giants benched Jones on November 18 in favor of DeVito. In his season debut on November 24 against the Tampa Bay Buccaneers, DeVito made 21-of-31 pass attempts for 189 yards and zero touchdowns as the Giants lost 30–7. Buccaneers' quarterback Baker Mayfield also mocked DeVito by mimicking his Italian hand gesture celebration after Mayfield scored a touchdown to end the first half. DeVito sustained a forearm injury during the loss, which sidelined him for the Giants' Thanksgiving game against the Dallas Cowboys. On December 15, he started against the Baltimore Ravens and completed 10-of-13 pass attempts for 68 yards before he was removed from the game after suffering a concussion.

At the end of the regular season, it was announced that DeVito would be returning to the Giants for the 2025 season. However, on August 26, 2025, DeVito was waived.

=== New England Patriots ===
==== 2025 ====
On August 27, 2025, DeVito was claimed off waivers by the New England Patriots as the third-string quarterback behind Drake Maye and Joshua Dobbs. He did not see any action during the season as the team reached the Super Bowl LX which resulted in a loss.

==== 2026 ====
On March 6, 2026, DeVito signed a two-year, $7.4 million extension with the Patriots. He became the team's backup quarterback behind Drake Maye. He started all three preseason games for the team and on August 27 against the Cleveland Browns, he threw a 45-yard touchdown pass to Kyle Williams.

On September 27, in a week 3 blow-out loss against the Jacksonville Jaguars the Patriots benched Maye for DeVito in the fourth quarter. He put up thirty yards in the eight minutes remaining.

On November 15th, against the Detroit Lions in Munich, DeVito came in for an injured Maye, completing 12 of 24 passes for 1 touchdown and 1 interception in a 35–10 loss.

== NFL career statistics ==
Year	Team	Games			Passing									Rushing					Sacks		Fumbles	
Year	Team	GP	GS	Record	Cmp	Att	Pct	Yds	Y/A	Lng	TD	Int	Rtg	Att	Yds	Y/A	Lng	TD	Sck	Yds	Fum	Lost
2023	NYG	9	6	3–3	114	178	64.0	1,101	6.2	41	8	3	89.2	36	195	5.4	26	1	37	196	2	1
2024	NYG	3	2	0–2	31	44	70.5	257	5.8	23	0	0	85.1	8	32	4.0	17	0	6	31	0	0
2025	NE	0	0	—	DNP																	
2026	NE	3	0	—	16	32	50.0	132	4.1	21	1	1	58.3	5	21	4.2	11	0	4	37	0	0
Career		15	8	3–5	161	254	63.4	1,490	5.9	41	9	4	84.6	49	248	5.1	26	1	47	264	2	1

== Personal life ==
Due to the proximity of his parents’ home to the Giants' facilities, DeVito elected to live with them during his rookie season. DeVito's rise to fame led to several advertising deals including a Super Bowl commercial, allowing him to move out before the 2024 season. He starred in a commercial for Progressive Insurance that debuted in the fall of 2025.

He has a younger brother Max, who played wide receiver at Salve Regina University.
