= Rakeem Nuñez-Roches =

Belizean gridiron football player (born 1993)

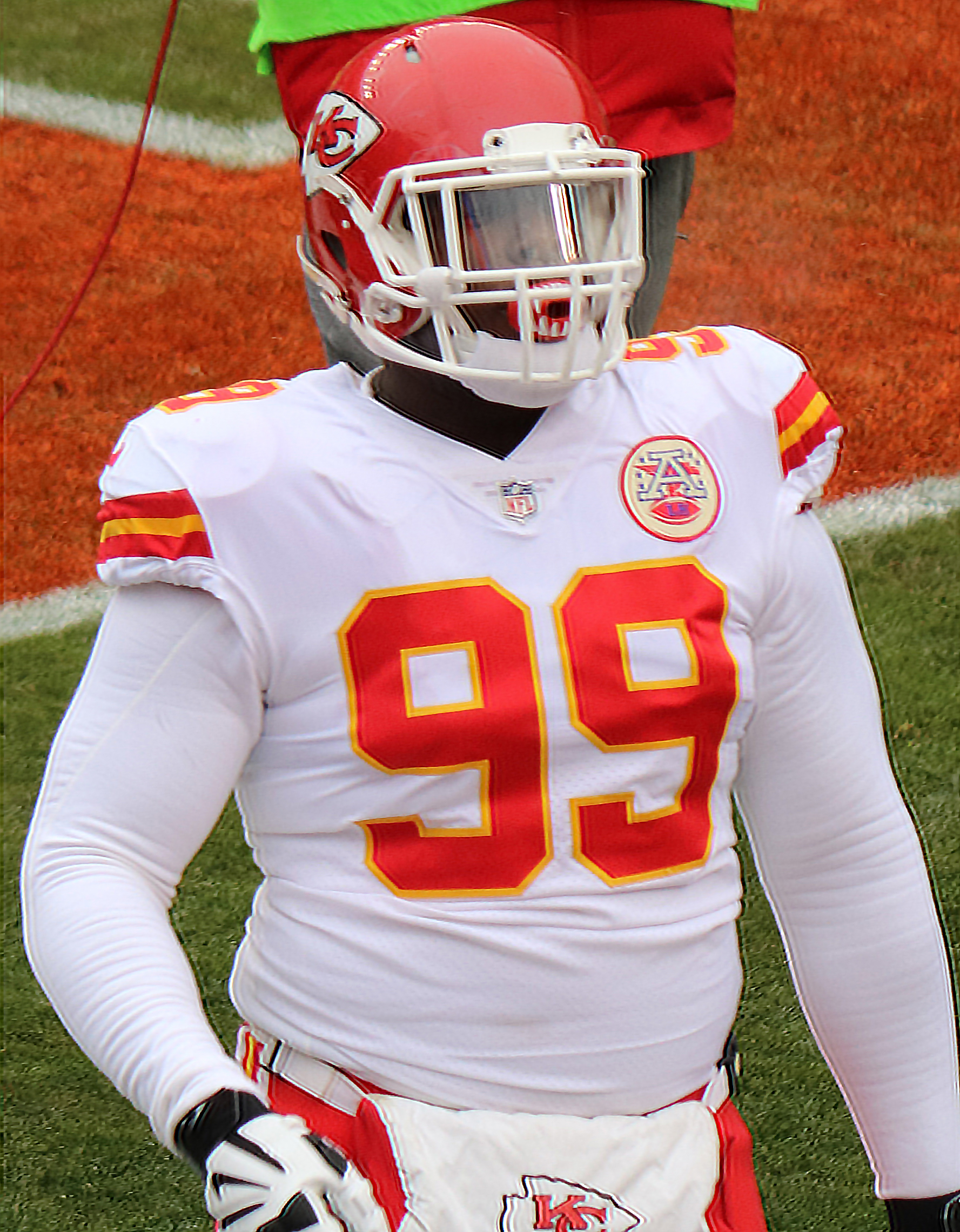
- Nuñez-Roches with the Kansas City Chiefs in 2017

No. 56 – Tampa Bay Buccaneers
- Position: Nose tackle
- Roster status: Active

Personal information
- Born: 3 July 1993 (age 33); Dangriga, Belize
- Listed height: 6 ft 2 in (1.88 m)
- Listed weight: 305 lb (138 kg)

Career information
- High school: Central (Phenix City, Alabama, U.S.)
- College: Southern Miss (2011–2014)
- NFL draft: 2015: 6th round, 217th overall pick

Career history
- Kansas City Chiefs (2015–2017); Indianapolis Colts (2018)*; Tampa Bay Buccaneers (2018–2022); New York Giants (2023–2025); Tampa Bay Buccaneers (2026–present)
- * Offseason or practice squad member only

Awards and highlights
- Super Bowl champion (LV)

Career NFL statistics as of 2025
- Total tackles: 233
- Sacks: 9.0
- Forced fumbles: 1
- Fumble recoveries: 1
- Pass deflections: 4
- Stats at Pro Football Reference

Rakeem Nathan Nuñez-Roches (born July 3, 1993) is a Belizean professional American football nose tackle for the Tampa Bay Buccaneers of the National Football League (NFL). He was selected by the Kansas City Chiefs in the sixth round of the 2015 NFL draft. He played college football for the Southern Miss Golden Eagles. He has also played for the New York Giants.

== Early life ==
Nuñez-Roches migrated with his family from Belize to Alabama when he was eight years old He attended Central High School in Phenix City, Alabama where he started to play football. For his high school football career, he recorded 132 career tackles, 17 sacks, and four forced fumbles. In football, he was rated as a three-star defensive lineman by ESPN, as well as two stars from Rivals.com and Scout.com. He was selected Second-team All-Area by the Opelika-Auburn News and was an Alabama Top 50 player.

== College career ==
Nuñez-Roches played at the University of Southern Mississippi from 2011 to 2014 where he majored in biological sciences.

As a freshman in 2011, he appeared in six games and was named to the Conference USA All-Freshman team. For the 2011 season, he recorded two tackles and 1.5 tackles-for-loss.

As a sophomore in 2012, he started 11 of 12 games, his only non-start being Southern Miss' senior night game against UTEP. For the 2012 season, he recorded 37 tackles, of which 22 were solo, six tackles-for-loss, one sack, and one forced fumble.

As a junior in 2013, he started the first two games of the season, before suffering a season-ending injury, which earned him a medical redshirt. For the season, he recorded eight tackles, of which two were solo, and 0.5 tackles-for-loss.

As a redshirt junior in 2014, he appeared in 11 games. He recorded 63 tackles (35 solo), 15 tackles-for-loss, four sacks, and one forced fumble. Following the 2014 season, he decided to forgo his final year of eligibility and entered the 2015 NFL draft.

== Professional career ==
Pre-draft measurables
Height	Weight	Arm length	Hand span	Wingspan	40-yard dash	10-yard split	20-yard split	20-yard shuttle	Three-cone drill	Vertical jump	Broad jump	Bench press
6 ft 2 1/4 in (1.89 m)	307 lb (139 kg)	32 5/8 in (0.83 m)	10 1/8 in (0.26 m)	6 ft 7 3/4 in (2.03 m)	5.02 s	1.71 s	2.90 s	4.69 s	7.67 s	34.0 in (0.86 m)	9 ft 6 in (2.90 m)	26 reps
All values from NFL Combine

=== Kansas City Chiefs ===
==== 2015 ====
Nuñez-Roches was selected in the sixth round with the 217th overall pick in the 2015 NFL draft by the Kansas City Chiefs. He was the first Belizean born player to ever be drafted in the NFL. On May 11, he signed his rookie contract with the Chiefs. In the 2015 season, he appeared in seven games and recorded four solo tackles.

==== 2016 ====
On September 17, 2016, Nuñez-Roches was released by the Chiefs. He was signed to the practice squad on September 20. He was signed to the active roster on October 18. On December 8, he recorded his first career sack against the Oakland Raiders. He appeared in eleven games and started five for the Chiefs in the 2016 season.

==== 2017 ====
In 2017, Nuñez-Roches played in all 16 games with 11 starts, recording 24 total tackles.

==== 2018 ====
On March 14, 2018, the Chiefs placed an original-round restricted free agent tender on Nuñez-Roches allowing him to negotiate with another team; however, the Chiefs have an option the match the contract. If they chose not to, they will receive a 6th round draft pick as compensation. On April 29, Nuñez-Roches officially re-signed with the Chiefs after no other teams made an offer. He was released by the Chiefs on May 8.

=== Indianapolis Colts ===
On May 11, 2018, Nuñez-Roches was claimed off waivers by the Indianapolis Colts. He was waived on September 1.

=== Tampa Bay Buccaneers (first stint) ===
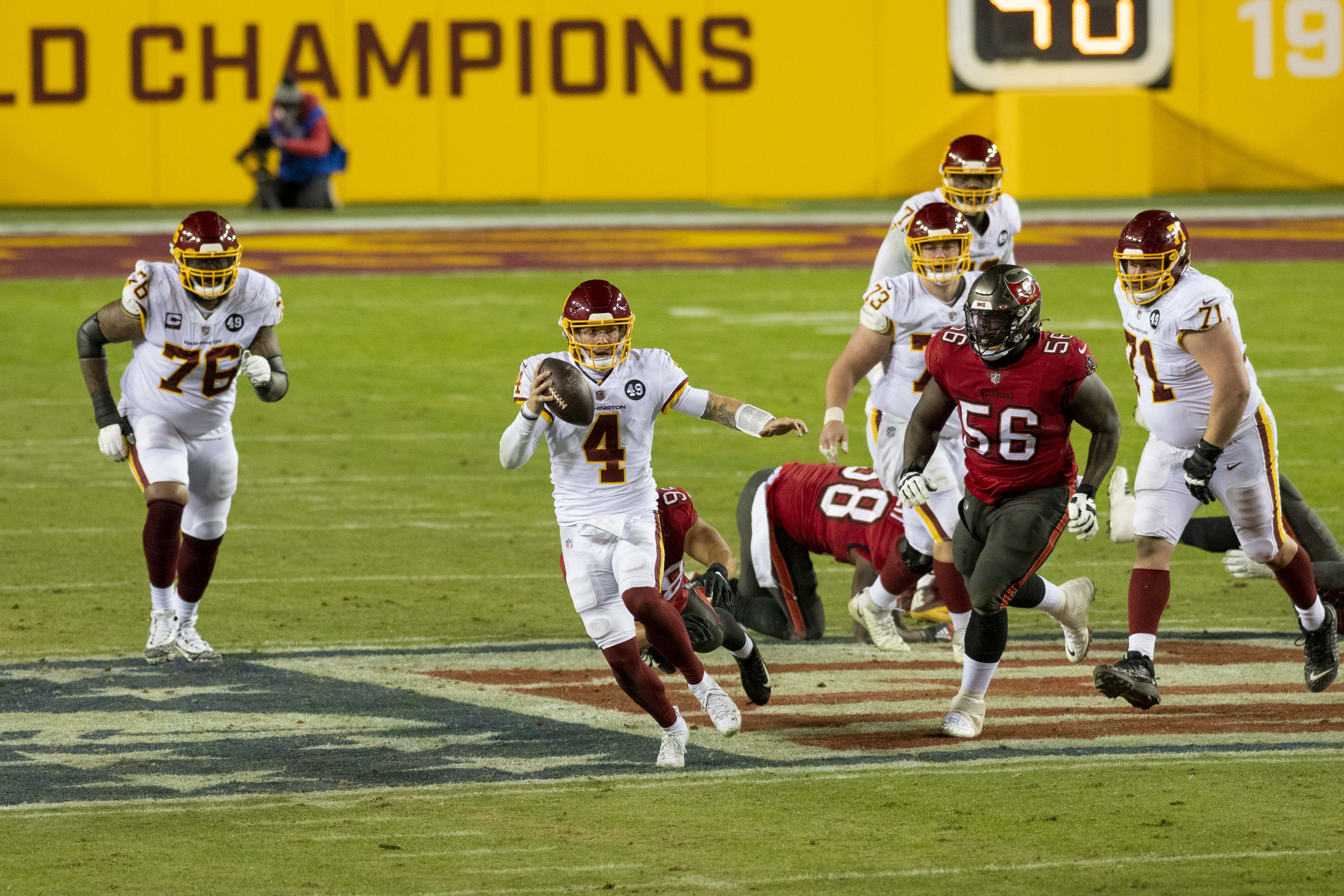
Nuñez-Roches (#56) playing against the Washington Football Team in Wild Card Playoff game.

On October 2, 2018, Nuñez-Roches was signed by the Tampa Bay Buccaneers. He appeared in only three games for the remainder of the 2018 season.

On March 15, 2019, Nuñez-Roches was re-signed by the Buccaneers. He played in all 16 games but was used as a rotational player defensively for the 2019 season.

On March 20, 2020, Nuñez-Roches was re-signed by the Buccaneers. He finished the 2020 season with 20 tackles in 16 games, of which he started 11. The Buccaneers finished with an 11–5 record for a wild card spot and eventually won Super Bowl LV by a score of 31–9 over the Kansas City Chiefs.

On March 20, 2021, Nuñez-Roches was re-signed by the Buccaneers. In the 2021 season, he appeared in 16 games and started one. He had 17 total tackles and one forced fumble. In the 2022 season, he appeared in all 17 games, of which he started ten. He finished with two sacks and 33 total tackles.

=== New York Giants ===
On March 17, 2023, Nuñez-Roches signed a three-year, $12 million contract with the New York Giants. In the 2023 season, Nuñez-Roches appeared in 16 games and started four. He finished with a half-sack, 26 total tackles, and one pass defended.

In the 2024 season, Nuñez-Roches appeared in and started 15 games. He finished with two sacks, 52 tackles, and two passes defended.

Nuñes-Roches made nine appearances (five starts) for New York during the 2025 campaign, recording one pass deflections, three sacks, and 23 combined tackles. On January 3, 2026, Nuñes-Roches was placed on season-ending injured reserve due to ankle and toe injuries.

=== Tampa Bay Buccaneers (second stint) ===
On April 7, 2026, Nuñez-Roches signed a one-year contract with the Tampa Bay Buccaneers.

== Career statistics ==
=== NFL ===
Legend
**Bold**	Career high

Year	Team	GP	GS	Cmb	Solo	Ast	Sck	PD	FF	FR
2015	KC	7	0	4	4	0	0.0	0	0	0
2016	KC	11	5	23	14	9	1.0	0	0	0
2017	KC	16	11	24	13	11	0.5	0	0	0
2018	TB	3	0	2	2	0	0.0	0	0	0
2019	TB	16	0	9	5	4	0.0	0	0	**1**
2020	TB	16	11	20	7	13	0.0	0	0	0
2021	TB	16	1	17	5	12	0.0	0	**1**	0
2022	TB	**17**	10	33	**19**	14	2.0	0	0	0
2023	NYG	16	4	26	14	12	0.5	1	0	0
2024	NYG	15	**15**	**52**	14	**38**	2.0	**2**	0	0
2025	NYG	9	5	23	6	17	**3.0**	1	0	0
Career		142	62	233	103	130	9.0	4	1	1

=== College ===
Year	Team	GP/GS	Tackles				Sacks	Pass defense		Fumbles		Safeties	TDs
Year	Team	GP/GS	Solo	Ast	Total	TFL	No	Int	PD	FF	FR	Safeties	TDs
2011	Southern Miss	6 / 0	2	0	2	1.5	0	0	0	0	0	0	0
2012	Southern Miss	12 / 11	22	15	37	6	1	0	0	1	0	0	0
2013	Southern Miss	2 / 2	2	6	8	0.5	0	0	0	0	0	0	0
2014	Southern Miss	11 / 11	35	28	63	15	4	0	0	1	0	0	0
Career		31 / 24	61	49	110	23	5	0	0	2	0	0	0

== Personal life ==
Born in Dangriga, Belize, Nuñez-Roches is fluent in both English and Garifuna.
