= 2019 New York Giants season =

95th season in franchise history

- Owner: John Mara; Steve Tisch
- General manager: Dave Gettleman
- Head coach: Pat Shurmur
- Home stadium: MetLife Stadium

Results
- Record: 4–12
- Division place: 3rd NFC East
- Playoffs: Did not qualify
- All-Pros: RB Saquon Barkley

Uniform
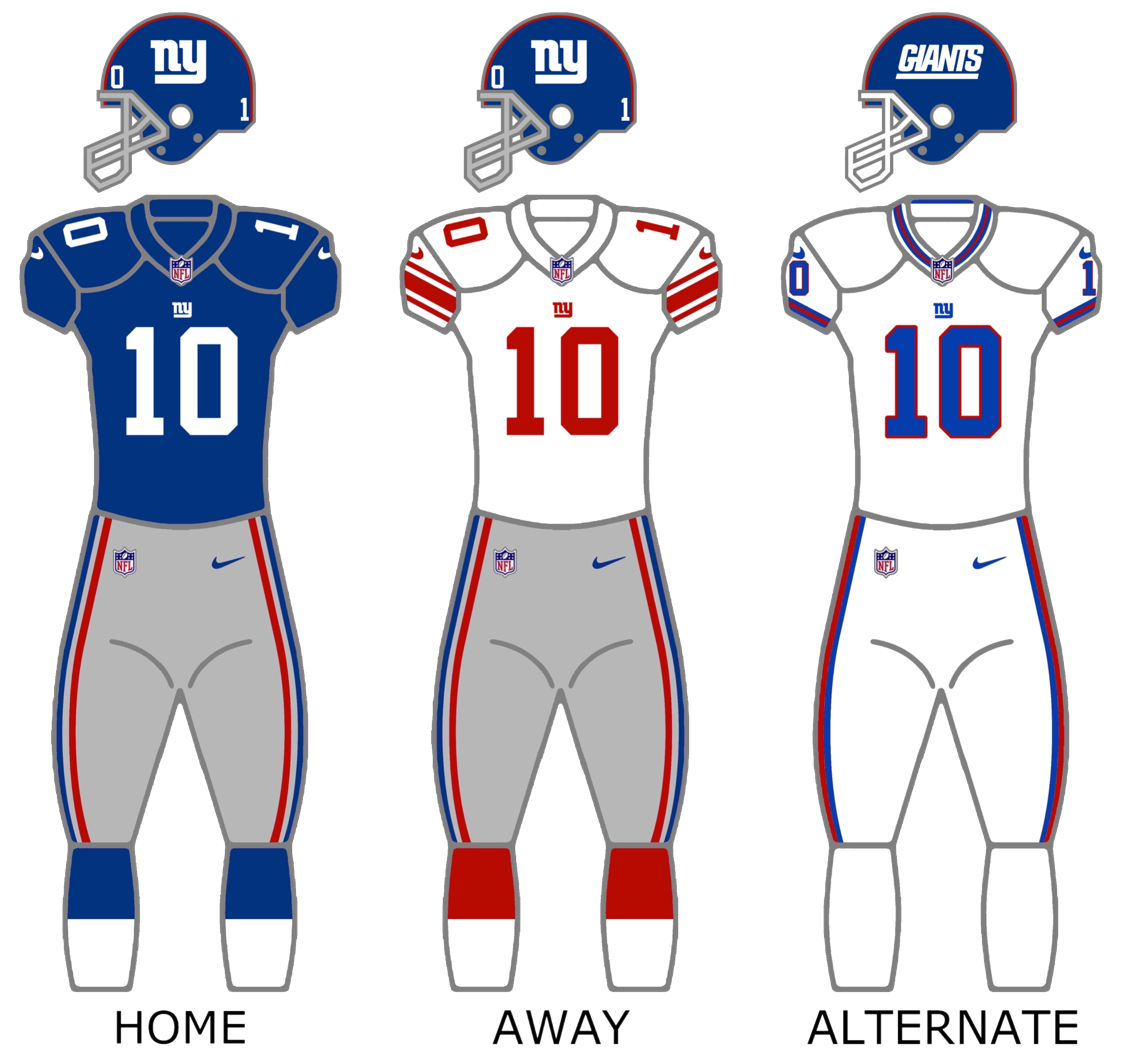

The 2019 season was the New York Giants' 95th in the National Football League (NFL), their 10th playing their home games at MetLife Stadium in East Rutherford, New Jersey, and their second and final season under head coach Pat Shurmur, who was fired after the final game of the regular season. During the season they equaled the franchise record nine-game losing streak of the 1976 Giants, predominantly due to ball security issues and poor defensive play. As a result, they ultimately failed to improve on their 5–11 campaign from 2018 as they finished at 4–12 in third place in the NFC East. For the first time since 1995, none of the team's players made the Pro Bowl.

The offseason saw some major changes to the Giants roster, with star wide receiver Odell Beckham Jr. and veteran linebacker Olivier Vernon being traded to the Cleveland Browns, and Pro Bowl safety Landon Collins being lost to the Washington Redskins during free agency. Wide receiver Golden Tate was the biggest name signing, arriving from the Philadelphia Eagles as a free agent.

After suffering defeats in the opening two games of the regular season the Giants made a change at quarterback, with veteran Eli Manning being benched in favor of first-round draft selection Daniel Jones. With Jones injured, Manning returned in Weeks 14 and 15, getting a win in the latter game to end the streak in what proved to be the final start of his 16-year career, as he announced his retirement soon after the end of the season. Manning started his last game on December 15, 2019, a 36–20 win over the Miami Dolphins, who was also the last player part of New York's 2011 Super Bowl championship team.

== Season summary ==
During the offseason the Giants made several controversial changes to their roster, headlined by the trade of star wide receiver Odell Beckham Jr. to the Cleveland Browns. The trade also sent veteran linebacker Olivier Vernon to the Browns, with the Giants receiving safety Jabrill Peppers and guard Kevin Zeitler in return, in addition to Cleveland's first-round and third-round picks in the 2019 NFL draft. Several other starters were lost during free agency, including Pro Bowl safety Landon Collins who ultimately signed a six-year, $84 million contract with division rivals, the Washington Redskins. This led to public backlash by fans and the media since a week prior to the Beckham trade, general manager Dave Gettleman stated he was not going to trade Beckham. The biggest signing of free agency was Golden Tate, who joined on a four-year, $37.5 million contract from the Detroit Lions; he would ultimately be suspended for the first four games of the regular season for violating the league's performance-enhancing drugs policy.

The Beckham trade meant the Giants had two first-round picks in the 2019 draft, and they added a third during the draft in a trade with the Seattle Seahawks. With those picks, they selected Duke quarterback Daniel Jones at number 6, Clemson defensive tackle Dexter Lawrence at 17, and Georgia cornerback Deandre Baker at 30. All three made the final roster, along with five of the Giants other seven draft selections. However, the Daniel Jones pick created more controversy as fans and the media criticized Gettleman on picking Jones too high as they believed Jones would be available with the 17th overall pick or later rounds. This led to the Giants not picking fan favorite prospect Ohio State quarterback Dwayne Haskins, who was a lifelong Giants fan who was drafted by the Washington Redskins with the 15th overall pick.

After losing the opening two games of the regular season against the Dallas Cowboys and Buffalo Bills, head coach Pat Shurmur announced that the Giants would be making a change at quarterback, with rookie Daniel Jones replacing 16-year veteran Eli Manning as the starter for the week 3 game at Tampa Bay. Jones threw for two touchdowns and rushed for two more as he led the Giants to victory, overcoming an 18-point deficit at half time and having lost star running back Saquon Barkley to injury in the second quarter. It was the Giants first win after being 18 or more points behind at half-time since 1949, and the second largest comeback in NFL history by a rookie quarterback making their first start. After MRI scans the following day, it was announced that Barkley had suffered a high right ankle sprain that would keep him out for four to eight weeks.

The Giants moved to 2–2 for the season with victory over the Washington Redskins the following week, but then suffered back-to-back defeats against the Minnesota Vikings and New England Patriots before Barkley returned sooner than expected for the week six match-up against the Arizona Cardinals. His return did not improve the team's fortunes as they lost their next two games to reach the midpoint of the regular season at 2–6. Prior to the NFL trade deadline, on October 29 the Giants sought to improve their struggling defense by trading for Leonard Williams from the New York Jets. It was the first time in NFL history the two organizations had completed a trade.

Further injury problems affected the team with starting wide receiver Sterling Shepard suffering from ongoing concussion symptoms that could be potentially career threatening. Having suffered a concussion during the week 1 game against the Dallas Cowboys, he suffered another during the week 5 game against the Minnesota Vikings and had been out since then, being put back into concussion protocol prior to the week 9 loss to the Cowboys. He was joined on the sidelines by starting center Jon Halapio, starting right tackle Mike Remmers and starting tight end Evan Engram, who would ultimately sit out the rest of the season. Starting left tackle Nate Solder and starting cornerback Janoris Jenkins then suffered concussions during the week 10 game against the New York Jets, as the Giants suffered their sixth straight defeat and entered their bye week in third place in the NFC East at 2–8.

The Giants losing streak continued after their bye with defeats against two NFC North opponents, the Chicago Bears in week 12 and Green Bay Packers in week 13, that firstly confirmed a third straight losing season and then put them out of contention for the playoffs. During the Packers game Jones suffered a high ankle sprain and, although he was able to finish the game, he would be ruled out of the following week's divisional match-up against the Eagles paving the way for Eli Manning to return as the starting quarterback. On his return Manning led the Giants to a healthy 17–3 halftime lead, linking up with rookie wide receiver Darius Slayton for two touchdowns, but he was unable to get the offense moving at all in the second half as the Eagles scored 14 unanswered points before snatching victory in overtime. With the loss the Giants tied the franchise record of nine consecutive defeats set in 1976. After calling a fan a "retard" on Twitter on the Wednesday following the game, and later failing to satisfactorily apologize, Jenkins was waived with an injury designation on December 13, 2019; he was claimed off waivers by the New Orleans Saints.

With Jones remaining on the sidelines in week 15, Manning continued as the starter as the Giants finally snapped their nine-game losing streak by defeating the Miami Dolphins 36–20. It was seen by many as a fitting farewell for Manning in what was his final start at Metlife Stadium. Jones returned to the starting lineup in Week 16 against the Redskins in a match up between rookie quarterbacks in Dwayne Haskins and Daniel Jones. Jones threw for a career high 352 yards and five touchdowns while Saquon Barkley rushed for a career high 189 yards and caught 4 passes with 90 receiving yards and two touchdowns as the Giants won 41–35 in overtime, sweeping the Redskins for the first time since 2014. On December 30, 2019, the day after a 34–17 loss to the Philadelphia Eagles in Week 17 left the team with a losing 4–12 record for the season, head coach Pat Shurmur was fired.

Following the end of the season, Eli Manning announced his retirement.

== Player movements ==
=== Free agency ===
==== Players with the Giants in the 2018 season ====
Position	Player	Tag	Date signed	2019 team	Notes
FB	Elijhaa Penny	ERFA	March 12, 2019	New York Giants	1 year, $645,000
C	Jon Halapio	ERFA	March 8, 2019	New York Giants	1 year, $645,000
K	Aldrick Rosas	ERFA	March 7, 2019	New York Giants	1 year, $645,000
DE	Kristjan Sokoli	ERFA			Not tendered
LB	Jordan Williams	ERFA			Not tendered
QB	Alex Tanney	RFA	March 4, 2019	New York Giants	2 years, $2.15 million
WR	Corey Coleman	RFA	April 16, 2019	New York Giants	1 year, $720,000
C	Spencer Pulley	RFA	March 11, 2019	New York Giants	3 years, $8.025 million
CB	Antonio Hamilton	RFA	March 15, 2019	New York Giants	1 year, $825,000
RB	Jonathan Stewart	UFA		Retired	Signed a one-day contract with the Carolina Panthers
TE	Scott Simonson	UFA	February 19, 2019	New York Giants	1 year, $895,000
WR	Cody Latimer	UFA	March 22, 2019	New York Giants	1 year, $1.41 million
WR	Bennie Fowler	UFA	March 19, 2019	New York Giants	1 year, $895,000
WR	Russell Shepard	UFA	April 15, 2019	New York Giants	1 year, $1.5 million
G	Jamon Brown	UFA		Atlanta Falcons	3 years, $18.75 million
G	John Greco	UFA			
NT	John Jenkins	UFA	May 13, 2019	New York Giants	1 year, $845,000
DE	Mario Edwards Jr.	UFA		New Orleans Saints	2 years, $4.7 million
DE	Kerry Wynn	UFA		Cincinnati Bengals	1 year, $1.4 million
DE	Josh Mauro	UFA		Oakland Raiders	1 year, $1.4 million
LB	Nate Stupar	UFA	March 20, 2019	New York Giants	1 year, $895,000
CB	B. W. Webb	UFA		Cincinnati Bengals	3 years, $10.5 million
CB	Tony Lippett	UFA	March 19, 2019	New York Giants	1 year, $810,000
S	Landon Collins	UFA	March 11, 2019	Washington Redskins	6 years, $84 million
S	Curtis Riley	UFA		Oakland Raiders	1 year, $810,000
LS	Zak DeOssie	UFA	March 19, 2019	New York Giants	1 year, $1.12 million

==== Players signed by the Giants from other teams ====
Position	Player	Tag	Date signed	2018 team	Notes
WR	Golden Tate	UFA	March 14, 2019	Philadelphia Eagles	4 years, $37.5 million
LB	Markus Golden	UFA	March 14, 2019	Arizona Cardinals	1 year, $3.28 million
DT	Olsen Pierre	UFA	March 16, 2019	Arizona Cardinals	1 year, $943,750
RB	Rod Smith	UFA	May 8, 2019	Dallas Cowboys	1 year, $805,000

=== NFL draft ===
2019 New York Giants draft
Round	Pick	Player	Position	College	Notes
1	6	Daniel Jones	QB	Duke	
1	17	Dexter Lawrence *	DT	Clemson	From Cleveland
1	30	Deandre Baker	CB	Georgia	From New Orleans via Green Bay via Seattle
3	95	Oshane Ximines	LB	Old Dominion	From New England via Cleveland
4	108	Julian Love *	CB	Notre Dame	
5	143	Ryan Connelly	LB	Wisconsin	
5	171	Darius Slayton	WR	Auburn	Compensatory selection
6	180	Corey Ballentine	CB	Washburn	
7	232	George Asafo-Adjei	OT	Kentucky	From Minnesota
7	245	Chris Slayton	DT	Syracuse	From LA Rams
Made roster † Pro Football Hall of Fame * Made at least one Pro Bowl during career

Notes

- The Giants forfeited their third-round selection after selecting cornerback Sam Beal in the 2018 supplemental draft.
- The Giants were awarded a fifth-round compensatory pick (171st overall) due to losing Justin Pugh to the Arizona Cardinals during the 2018 Offseason.

Pre-draft trades

- The Giants traded 2018 fourth-round (John Franklin-Myers) and sixth-round (John Kelly) picks to the Los Angeles Rams for linebacker Alec Ogletree and a 2019 seventh-round pick (245th).
- The Giants traded center Brett Jones to the Minnesota Vikings in exchange for their seventh-round selection (232rd).
- The Giants traded Eli Apple to New Orleans for their 2019 fourth-round pick (132nd) and their 2020 seventh-round pick. The 2019 pick was traded to Seattle during the draft.
- The Giants traded Damon Harrison to Detroit for a conditional 2019 fifth-round pick. The condition was that the Lions would give the higher of their own 2019 fifth-round pick or the fifth-round pick that was previously acquired from the San Francisco 49ers in a trade for Laken Tomlinson. Ultimately the Giants received the pick originally held by San Francisco (142nd). This pick was traded to Seattle during the draft.
- The Giants traded wide receiver Odell Beckham Jr. and defensive end Olivier Vernon to the Cleveland Browns in exchange for a first-round selection (17th), a third-round selection previously acquired from New England (95th), guard Kevin Zeitler, and safety Jabrill Peppers.

Draft trades

- The Giants traded their second-, fourth- and fifth-round selections (37th, 132nd and 142nd) for Seattle's first-round selection (30th) to select Deandre Baker.

=== Undrafted free agents ===
The Giants signed a number of undrafted free agents. Unless stated otherwise, they were signed on May 2, 2019.

Position	Player	College	Notes
T	Paul Adams	Missouri	Waived during final roster cuts
DB	Jake Carlock	LIU Post	Waived during final roster cuts; resigned to practice squad
TE	C. J. Conrad	Kentucky	Waived during final roster cuts; resigned to practice squad
QB	Eric Dungey	Syracuse	Waived on July 24, 2019
DE	Jeremiah Harris	Eastern Michigan	Waived/injured on June 4, 2019
DE	Nate Harvey	East Carolina	Placed on Injured Reserve on May 5, 2019
RB	Jon Hilliman	Rutgers	Waived during final roster cuts; resigned to practice squad
DB	Mark McLaurin	Mississippi State	Placed on Injured Reserve on August 5, 2019
C	James O'Hagan	SUNY Buffalo	Waived during final roster cuts
LB	Josiah Tauaefa	UTSA	Waived during final roster cuts; resigned to practice squad
DB	Jacob Thieneman	Purdue	Waived/injured on May 14, 2019
WR	Alex Wesley	Northern Colorado	Waived during final roster cuts
WR	Reggie White Jr.	Monmouth	Waived during final roster cuts; resigned to practice squad
G	Freedom Akinmoladun	Nebraska	Signed on May 14. Waived during final roster cuts; re-signed to practice squad

=== Other signings ===
Date	Position	Player	Previous team	Notes
March 12	S	Antoine Bethea	Arizona Cardinals	2 years, $6.5 million
March 14	S	Jabrill Peppers	Cleveland Browns	Acquired by trade (see trade details).
March 14	G	Kevin Zeitler	Cleveland Browns	Acquired by trade (see trade details).
April 11	CB	Henre' Toliver	Salt Lake Stallions (AAF)	Free agent signing. Waived on August 31, 2019.
May 5	DE	Alex Jenkins		Free agent signing. Waived on August 14, 2019.
May 6	G	Austin Droogsma		Free agent signing. Waived on August 5, 2019.
May 6	K	Joey Slye		Free agent signing. Waived on May 14, 2019.
May 14	OT	Mike Remmers	Minnesota Vikings	Free agent signing; signed a 1-year deal.
June 4	LB	Keion Adams	Pittsburgh Steelers	Free agent signing.
July 24	TE	Isaiah Searight	Tampa Bay Buccaneers	Free agent signing.
July 24	K	Joey Slye		Free agent signing. Waived on July 27, 2019.
July 24	WR	Da'Mari Scott	Buffalo Bills	From waivers. Waived on August 21, 2019.
July 27	WR	T. J. Jones	Detroit Lions	Free agent signing. Waived on August 31, 2019.
July 27	WR	Amba Etta-Tawo	Birmingham Iron (AAF)	Free agent signing.
August 5	LB	Terrence Fede	Buffalo Bills	Free agent signing. Cut on August 31, 2019.
August 5	LB	Joey Alfieri	Philadelphia Eagles	From waivers. Cut on August 31, 2019.
August 5	G	Malcolm Bunche	Arizona Hotshots (AAF)	Free agent signing. Cut on August 31, 2019.
August 13	TE	Jake Powell	New Orleans Saints	Free agent signing. Cut on August 31, 2019.
August 14	CB	Terrell Sinkfield	Orlando Apollos (AAF)	Free agent signing. Cut on August 31, 2019.
August 14	P	Johnny Townsend	Oakland Raiders	From waivers. Cut on August 31, 2019.
September 1	WR	Cody Core	Cincinnati Bengals	From waivers.
September 1	OT	Eric Smith	New York Jets	From waivers.
September 1	TE	Eric Tomlinson	New York Jets	Free agent signing.
September 2	LB	David Mayo	San Francisco 49ers	Free agent signing.
September 9	LB	Tuzar Skipper	Pittsburgh Steelers	From waivers.
September 11	WR	T. J. Jones	New York Giants	Free agent signing; resigned having been waived during final roster cuts on August 31.
September 16	TE	Kaden Smith	San Francisco 49ers	From waivers.
September 24	LB	Nate Stupar	New York Giants	Resigned having been released on September 6.
September 26	RB	Jon Hilliman	New York Giants	Signed from the practice squad.
September 30	DE	Chris Peace	Los Angeles Chargers	From waivers.
October 1	LB	Josiah Tauaefa	New York Giants	Signed from the practice squad.
October 10	RB	Austin Walter	New York Giants	Signed from the practice squad to add running back depth prior to week 6. Waived the following day.
October 11	QB	Alex Tanney	New York Giants	Resigned having been released the previous day to make room for Austin Walter.
October 11	RB	Javorius Allen	New Orleans Saints	Free agent signing.
October 14	WR	Bennie Fowler	New York Giants	Resigned having been released on October 1.
October 22	LB	Devante Downs	New York Giants	Signed from the practice squad.
October 22	LB	Deone Bucannon	Tampa Bay Buccaneers	Free agent signing.
October 29	DE	Leonard Williams	New York Jets	Acquired by trade (see trade details).
November 9	C	Evan Brown	New York Giants	Signed from the practice squad. Waived the following week.
November 12	TE	Scott Simonson	New York Giants	Free agent signing; re-signed having been released with an injury settlement on September 10.
November 27	WR	Da'Mari Scott	New York Giants	Signed from the practice squad.
November 30	LS	Colin Holba	New York Giants	Signed from the practice squad after Zak DeOssie had been placed on injured reserve.
December 17	WR	David Sills V	New York Giants	Signed from the practice squad after tight end Evan Engram had been placed on injured reserve.
December 18	S	Rashaan Gaulden	New York Giants	Signed from the practice squad, filling the vacancy left by Janoris Jenkins.
December 27	DE	Chris Slayton	New York Giants	Signed from the practice squad, after Rhett Ellison was placed on injured reserve.
December 28	TE	Garrett Dickerson	New York Giants	Signed from the practice squad, after Scott Simonson was placed on injured reserve.

=== Practice squad ===
Having been cut as the roster was trimmed to the 53-man limit on August 31, Reggie White, Jr., Jon Hilliman, C. J. Conrad, Josiah Tauaefa, Jake Carlock, Evan Brown, Freedom Akinmoladun and Chris Slayton were resigned to the practice squad alongside new signings Corn Elder and David Sills V. On September 18, 2019, Conrad was released and running back Austin Walter was signed to replace him. Following an injury to starting running back Saquon Barkley in week 3, Hilliman was signed to the active roster on September 26. On October 1, Tauaefa was signed to the active roster and the Giants filled out their practice squad by signing wide receiver Da'Mari Scott, who had been with the team during the offseason, and linebacker Devante Downs.

With backup running back Wayne Gallman joining Barkley on the sidelines, Walter was signed to the active roster on October 10, prior to the week 6 matchup against New England. Hilliman was resigned to the practice squad on October 15, 2019, having been waived following the New England game. On October 22, 2019, Downs was signed to the active roster; the place was filled by Tuzar Skipper, who had been waived on the same day. On October 30, 2019, Carlock was released, with punter Sean Smith being signed to replace him the following day. Smith was released on November 5, Safety Sean Chandler was signed to the practice squad on November 6, the day after he was waived from the active roster.

On November 9, with the Giants struggling with injuries to several members of the offensive line, Brown was signed to the active roster. On November 12, Elder was signed by the Carolina Panthers. Later that day, White and Akinmoladun were released and the open spots on the practice squad were filled by tight end Garrett Dickerson, wide receiver Alex Bachman and long-snapper Colin Holba. On November 13, Brown was re-signed. On November 20, Skipper was signed by the Pittsburgh Steelers, with cornerback Derrick Baity filling the vacancy on the practice squad. On November 27, Scott was promoted to the active roster, and White was re-signed. On November 30, Holba was promoted to the active roster.

On December 4, Brown was signed by the Miami Dolphins. On December 5, the Giants signed rookie center Tanner Volson, and ex-Panthers safety Rashaan Gaulden to the fill the vacant spots on the practice squad. On December 7, Chandler was re-signed to the active roster, replacing Jabrill Peppers, who was placed on injured reserve. On December 11, Sean Smith was re-signed to fill the vacancy. On December 17, Sills was signed the active roster, and tackle Nate Wozniak was signed to the practice squad. The following day, Gaulden was promoted and defensive end Kevin Wilkins was added to the practice squad. On December 24, Smith was released and full back George Aston signed to replace him on the roster. Slayton and Dickerson were promoted to the active roster on December 27 and 28 respectively.

==== Reserve/Futures ====
Following the end of the season all eight remaining practice squad members (Aston, Bachman, Baity, Hilliman, Volson, White, Jr., Wilkins and Wozniak) were signed to reserve/futures contracts along with Conrad and Smith, who had both been with the Giants earlier in the season, and long snapper Drew Scott.

=== Other departures ===
Date	Position	Player	Notes
March 14	WR	Odell Beckham Jr.	Traded to the Cleveland Browns (see trade details).
March 14	DE	Olivier Vernon	Traded to the Cleveland Browns (see trade details).
April 15	WR	Quadree Henderson	Waived.
May 1	T	Jylan Ware	Waived.
May 2	WR	Jawill Davis	Waived.
May 9	RB	Robert Martin	Waived.
June 6	LB	Jeremiah Harris	Waived (originally waived/injured on June 6 before reaching an injury settlement).
June 13	S	Jacob Thieneman	Waived (originally waived/injured on May 14 before reverting to injured reserve).
May 14	K	Joey Slye	Waived.
July 24	QB	Eric Dungey	Waived.
July 24	CB	Tony Lippett	Waived.
July 27	K	Joey Slye	Waived.
August 5	G	Austin Droogsma	Waived.
August 13	DE	Alex Jenkins	Waived (originally waived/injured on August 5 before reaching an injury settlement).
August 14	P	Ryan Anderson	Waived.
August 21	WR	Da'Mari Scott	Waived.
August 31	QB	Kyle Lauletta	Waived.
August 31	WR	T. J. Jones	Released (vested veteran).
August 31	LB	Terrence Fede	Released (vested veteran).
August 31	DT	John Jenkins	Released (vested veteran).
August 31	DE	Chris Slayton	Waived. Signed to practice squad on September 1.
August 31	RB	Jon Hilliman	Waived. Signed to practice squad on September 1.
August 31	WR	Reggie White, Jr.	Waived. Signed to practice squad on September 1.
August 31	TE	C. J. Conrad	Waived. Signed to practice squad on September 1.
August 31	TE	Jake Powell	Waived.
August 31	C	Evan Brown	Waived. Signed to practice squad on September 1.
August 31	C	James O'Hagan	Waived.
August 31	OT	Paul Adams	Waived.
August 31	OT	Malcolm Bunche	Waived.
August 31	LB	Avery Moss	Waived.
August 31	DE	Jake Ceresna	Waived.
August 31	DE	Freedom Akinmoladun	Waived. Signed to practice squad on September 1.
August 31	LB	Josiah Tauaefa	Waived. Signed to practice squad on September 1.
August 31	LB	Jake Carlock	Waived. Signed to practice squad on September 1.
August 31	LB	Joey Alfieri	Waived.
August 31	CB	Tenny Adewusi	Waived.
August 31	CB	Terrell Sinkfield	Waived.
August 31	P	Johnny Townsend	Waived.
August 31	LS	Taybor Pepper	Waived.
August 31	S	Kamrin Moore	Waived off the commissioners' exempt list.
September 1	WR	Alonzo Russell	Waived.
September 1	OT	Brian Mihalik	Waived.
September 2	LB	B. J. Goodson	Traded to the Green Bay Packers (see trade details).
September 5	S	Kenny Ladler	Waived (originally waived/injured on August 31 before reaching an injury settlement).
September 5	CB	Henre' Tolliver	Waived (originally waived/injured on August 31 before reaching an injury settlement).
September 5	CB	Ronald Zamort	Waived (originally waived/injured on August 31 before reaching an injury settlement).
September 6	LB	Nate Stupar	Released (vested veteran).
September 9	LB	Jonathan Anderson	Released (vested veteran; placed on injured reserve on August 31 before reaching an injury settlement).
September 9	WR	Brittan Golden	Released (vested veteran; placed on injured reserve on August 31 before reaching an injury settlement).
September 9	T	Chad Wheeler	Waived (originally waived/injured on August 31 before reaching an injury settlement).
September 10	RB	Rod Smith	Released (vested veteran; placed on injured reserve on August 31 before reaching an injury settlement).
September 10	TE	Scott Simonson	Released (vested veteran; placed on injured reserve on August 31 before reaching an injury settlement).
September 10	T	Victor Salako	Waived (originally waived/injured on August 31 before reaching an injury settlement).
September 11	WR	Alex Wesley	Waived (originally waived/injured on August 31 before reaching an injury settlement).
September 16	RB	Paul Perkins	Waived in order to sign tight end Kaden Smith.
September 24	TE	Eric Tomlinson	Released (vested veteran) in order sign linebacker Nate Stupar.
October 1	WR	T. J. Jones	Released (vested veteran).
October 1	WR	Bennie Fowler	Released (vested veteran).
October 10	QB	Alex Tanney	Released (vested veteran) in order to sign running back Austin Walter. Resigned the following day.
October 11	RB	Austin Walter	Waived, a day after being signed from the practice squad prior to week 6 due to injuries at running back.
October 11	RB	Jon Hilliman	Waived in order to make room for running back Javorius Allen.
October 14	LB	Nate Stupar	Released (vested veteran) for the second time, to make room for wide receiver Bennie Fowler.
October 21	LB	Keion Adams	Waived from injured reserve.
October 22	TE	Garrett Dickerson	Waived in order to make room for linebacker Devante Downs.
October 22	LB	Tuzar Skipper	Waived in order to make room for linebacker Deone Bucannon, and re-signed to the practice squad.
October 29	LB	Tae Davis	Waived in order to make room for defensive end Leonard Williams.
November 5	S	Sean Chandler	Waived in order to make room for cornerback Sam Beal, who was activated from injured reserve.
November 9	DE	Olsen Pierre	Waived in order to make room for center Evan Brown.
November 12	C	Evan Brown	Waived. Re-signed to the practice squad the following day.
November 26	WR	Bennie Fowler	Waived.
December 13	CB	Janoris Jenkins	Waived/injured after posting an offensive tweet to a fan. Claimed by the New Orleans Saints.

To trim the roster down to the 53-man NFL limit prior to the league's August 31 deadline, many players were cut (waived) on this date.

=== Trade details ===
- On March 14, the Giants traded wide receiver Odell Beckham Jr. and linebacker Olivier Vernon to Cleveland for safety Jabrill Peppers, guard Kevin Zeitler, a first-round pick (#17), and a third-round pick (#95) in the 2019 NFL Draft.
- On September 2, the Giants traded B. J. Goodson to the Green Bay Packers in exchange for the right to swap seventh-round picks in the 2020 NFL draft.
- On October 29, the Giants traded for defensive end Leonard Williams from the New York Jets in exchange for a third-round pick in the 2020 NFL Draft and a fifth-round pick in the 2021 NFL draft, which could become a fourth-round pick should Williams sign a contract extension before the start of the 2020 season.

== Staff ==
2019 New York Giants staff
Front office: President/CEO – John Mara; Chairman/executive vice president – Steve Tisch; Senior vice president & general manager – Dave Gettleman; Vice president of football operations/assistant general manager – Kevin Abrams; Senior vice president of player personnel – Chris Mara; Director of player personnel – Mark Koncz; Director of pro personnel – Ken Sternfeld; Assistant director of pro personnel – Matt Shauger; Director of college scouting – Chris Pettit; Director of player development – David Tyree; Head coaches: Head coach – Pat Shurmur; Offensive coaches: Offensive coordinator/Quarterbacks – Mike Shula; Running backs – Craig Johnson; Wide receivers – Tyke Tolbert; Tight ends – Lunda Wells; Offensive line – Hal Hunter; Assistant offensive line – Ben Wilkerson; Offensive assistant – Ryan Roeder	Defensive coaches: Defensive coordinator – James Bettcher; Defensive line – Gary Emanuel; Linebackers – Bill McGovern; Outside linebackers – Mike Dawson; Defensive backs – Everett Withers; Assistant defensive backs – Henry Baker; Defensive assistant – Bobby Blick; Special teams coaches: Special teams coordinator – Thomas McGaughey; Assistant special teams – Anthony Blevins; Assistant special teams – Tom Quinn; Strength and conditioning: Strength and conditioning – Aaron Wellman; Assistant strength and conditioning – Thomas Stallworth; Director of performance nutrition – Pratik Patel; Performance manager – Joe Danos

== Final roster ==
2019 New York Giants roster
Quarterbacks (QB): 8 Daniel Jones; 10 Eli Manning; 3 Alex Tanney; Running backs (RB): 37 Javorius Allen; 26 Saquon Barkley; 22 Wayne Gallman; 39 Elijhaa Penny FB; Wide receivers (WR): 17 Cody Core; 12 Cody Latimer; 18 Da'Mari Scott; 87 Sterling Shepard; 84 David Sills; 86 Darius Slayton; 15 Golden Tate; Tight ends (TE): 89 Garrett Dickerson; 82 Kaden Smith	Offensive linemen (OL): 65 Nick Gates T/G; 75 Jon Halapio C; 71 Will Hernandez G; 77 Spencer Pulley C; 74 Mike Remmers T; 62 Chad Slade G; 79 Eric Smith T; 76 Nate Solder T; 70 Kevin Zeitler G; Defensive linemen (DL): 95 B. J. Hill DE; 97 Dexter Lawrence DE; 90 R. J. McIntosh DE; 91 Chris Slayton DE; 94 Dalvin Tomlinson NT; 99 Leonard Williams DE	Linebackers (LB): 29 Deone Bucannon ILB; 59 Lorenzo Carter OLB; 52 Devante Downs OLB; 44 Markus Golden OLB; 96 Kareem Martin OLB; 55 David Mayo ILB; 47 Alec Ogletree ILB; 48 Josiah Tauaefa ILB; 53 Oshane Ximines OLB; Defensive backs (DB): 27 Deandre Baker CB; 25 Corey Ballentine CB; 23 Sam Beal CB; 41 Antoine Bethea FS; 36 Sean Chandler FS; 38 Rashaan Gaulden FS; 34 Grant Haley CB; 30 Antonio Hamilton CB; 24 Julian Love SS; 31 Michael Thomas SS; Special teams (ST): 9 Riley Dixon P; 69 Colin Holba LS; 2 Aldrick Rosas K	Practice squad: 45 George Aston FB; 80 Alex Bachman WR; 35 Derrick Baity CB; 28 Jon Hilliman RB; 68 Nate Wozniak T; 63 Tanner Volson C; 98 Kevin Wilkins DE; 13 Reggie White Jr. WR; Reserve: 78 George Asafo-Adjei T (IR); 19 Corey Coleman WR (IR); 57 Ryan Connelly ILB (IR); 51 Zak DeOssie LS (IR); 85 Rhett Ellison TE (IR); 88 Evan Engram TE (IR); 6 Amba Etta-Tawo WR (IR); 49 Nate Harvey OLB (IR); 43 Chris Peace OLB (IR); 21 Jabrill Peppers SS (IR); 81 Russell Shepard WR (IR); 83 Scott Simonson TE (IR); 46 Mark McLaurin ILB (IR); 49 Isaiah Searight TE (IR); Rookies in italics 53 active, 14 reserve, 8 practice squad

== Preseason ==
Week	Date	Opponent	Result	Record	Venue	Recap
1	August 8	New York Jets	W 31–22	1–0	MetLife Stadium	Recap
2	August 16	Chicago Bears	W 32–13	2–0	MetLife Stadium	Recap
3	August 22	at Cincinnati Bengals	W 25–23	3–0	Paul Brown Stadium	Recap
4	August 29	at New England Patriots	W 31–29	4–0	Gillette Stadium	Recap

== Regular season ==
=== Schedule ===
Week	Date	Opponent	Result	Record	Venue	Recap
1	September 8	at **Dallas Cowboys**	**L** 17–35	0–1	AT&T Stadium	Recap
2	September 15	Buffalo Bills	**L** 14–28	0–2	MetLife Stadium	Recap
3	September 22	at Tampa Bay Buccaneers	**W** 32–31	1–2	Raymond James Stadium	Recap
4	September 29	**Washington Redskins**	**W** 24–3	2–2	MetLife Stadium	Recap
5	October 6	Minnesota Vikings	**L** 10–28	2–3	MetLife Stadium	Recap
6	October 10	at New England Patriots	**L** 14–35	2–4	Gillette Stadium	Recap
7	October 20	Arizona Cardinals	**L** 21–27	2–5	MetLife Stadium	Recap
8	October 27	at Detroit Lions	**L** 26–31	2–6	Ford Field	Recap
9	November 4	**Dallas Cowboys**	**L** 18–37	2–7	MetLife Stadium	Recap
10	November 10	at New York Jets	**L** 27–34	2–8	MetLife Stadium	Recap
11	Bye					
12	November 24	at Chicago Bears	**L** 14–19	2–9	Soldier Field	Recap
13	December 1	Green Bay Packers	**L** 13–31	2–10	MetLife Stadium	Recap
14	December 9	at **Philadelphia Eagles**	**L** 17–23 (OT)	2–11	Lincoln Financial Field	Recap
15	December 15	Miami Dolphins	**W** 36–20	3–11	MetLife Stadium	Recap
16	December 22	at **Washington Redskins**	**W** 41–35 (OT)	4–11	FedExField	Recap
17	December 29	**Philadelphia Eagles**	**L** 17–34	4–12	MetLife Stadium	Recap

Note: Intra-division opponents are in bold text.

=== Game summaries ===
==== Week 1: at Dallas Cowboys ====
Week One: New York Giants at Dallas Cowboys – Game summary

Quarter	1	2	3	4	Total
Giants	7	0	3	7	**17**
**Cowboys**	7	14	14	0	**35**

at AT&T Stadium, Arlington, Texas

- Date: September 8
- Game time: 4:25 p.m. EDT/3:25 p.m. CDT
- Game weather: Played indoors (retractable roof closed)
- Game attendance: 90,353
- Referee: Walt Anderson
- TV announcers (Fox): Joe Buck, Troy Aikman and Erin Andrews
- Recap, Game Book

Game information

**First quarter**

- NYG – Evan Engram 1-yard pass from Eli Manning (Aldrick Rosas kick), 8:06. Giants 7–0. **Drive: 7 plays, 91 yards, 4:07.**
- DAL – Blake Jarwin 28-yard pass from Dak Prescott (Brett Maher kick), 3:19. Tied 7–7. **Drive: 11 plays, 75 yards, 4:47.**

**Second quarter**

- DAL – Jason Witten 4-yard pass from Dak Prescott (Brett Maher kick), 10:19. Cowboys 14–7. **Drive: 9 plays, 93 yards, 4:59.**
- DAL – Amari Cooper 21-yard pass from Dak Prescott (Brett Maher kick), 1:13. Cowboys 21–7. **Drive: 13 plays, 83 yards, 6:43.**

**Third quarter**

- NYG – Aldrick Rosas 28-yard field goal, 10:59. Cowboys 21–10. **Drive: 11 plays, 75 yards, 4:01.**
- DAL – Randall Cobb 25-yard pass from Dak Prescott (Brett Maher kick), 9:48. Cowboys 28–10. **Drive: 3 plays, 75 yards, 1:11.**
- DAL – Ezekiel Elliott 10-yard run (Brett Maher kick), 1:14. Cowboys 35–10. **Drive: 7 plays, 89 yards, 3:59.**

**Fourth quarter**

- NYG – Wayne Gallman 2-yard run (Aldrick Rosas kick), 2:49. Cowboys 35–17. **Drive: 6 plays, 75 yards, 2:25.**

**Top passers**

- NYG – Eli Manning – 30/44, 306 yards, TD
- DAL – Dak Prescott – 25/32, 405 yards, 4 TD

**Top rushers**

- NYG – Saquon Barkley – 11 rushes, 120 yards
- DAL – Ezekiel Elliott – 13 rushes, 53 yards, TD

**Top receivers**

- NYG – Evan Engram – 11 receptions, 116 yards, TD
- DAL – Michael Gallup – 7 receptions, 158 yards

Despite a strong opening drive for the Giants resulting in a touchdown by Evan Engram, the Giants defense failed to get off the field for virtually the entire day, allowing five consecutive touchdown drives to the Cowboys. The Giants offense could not keep up, as some questionable play call decisions by head coach Pat Shurmur took more potential points off the board.

For the third consecutive season, the Giants began at 0–1. This was their fifth consecutive loss to the Cowboys. Eli Manning set a franchise record becoming the first Giant to play 16 seasons, and first round pick Daniel Jones made his NFL debut in the late stages of a blowout loss.

==== Week 2: vs. Buffalo Bills ====
Week Two: Buffalo Bills at New York Giants – Game summary

Quarter	1	2	3	4	Total
**Bills**	7	14	0	7	**28**
Giants	7	0	0	7	**14**

at MetLife Stadium, East Rutherford, New Jersey

- Date: September 15
- Game time: 1:00 pm. EDT
- Game weather: Fair, 79 °F (26 °C)
- Game attendance: 74,569
- Referee: Shawn Smith
- TV announcers (CBS): Greg Gumbel, Trent Green and Melanie Collins
- Recap, Game Book

Game information

**First quarter**

- NYG – Saquon Barkley 27-yard run (Aldrick Rosas kick), 12:36. Giants 7–0. **Drive: 5 plays, 75 yards, 2:24.**
- BUF – Josh Allen 6-yard run (Steven Hauschka kick), 3:43. Tied 7–7. **Drive: 10 plays, 75 yards, 5:46.**

**Second quarter**

- BUF – Devin Singletary 14-yard run (Steven Hauschka kick), 13:24. Bills 14–7. **Drive: 11 plays, 70 yards, 4:15.**
- BUF – Isaiah McKenzie 14-yard pass from Josh Allen (Steven Hauschka kick), 7:30. Bills 21–7. **Drive: 7 plays, 98 yards, 4:26.**

**Third quarter**

- No scoring plays.

**Fourth quarter**

- NYG – T. J. Jones 4-yard pass from Eli Manning (Aldrick Rosas kick), 11:56. Bills 21–14. **Drive: 12 plays, 76 yards, 6:17.**
- BUF – Frank Gore 1-yard run (Steven Hauschka kick), 5:53. Bills 28–14. **Drive: 13 plays, 75 yards, 6:03.**

**Top passers**

- BUF – Josh Allen – 19/30, 253 yards, TD
- NYG – Eli Manning – 26/45, 250 yards, TD, 2 INT

**Top rushers**

- BUF – Frank Gore – 19 rushes, 68 yards, TD
- NYG – Saquon Barkley – 18 rushes, 107 yards, TD

**Top receivers**

- BUF – Cole Beasley – 4 receptions, 83 yards
- NYG – Bennie Fowler III – 5 receptions, 51 yards

The Giants scored a touchdown on their opening drive and struggled to move the ball afterwards. With the loss, the Giants fell to 0–2. This game is notable for being Eli Manning's final start before being benched in favor of rookie Daniel Jones.

==== Week 3: at Tampa Bay Buccaneers ====
Week Three: New York Giants at Tampa Bay Buccaneers – Game summary

Quarter	1	2	3	4	Total
**Giants**	3	7	15	7	**32**
Buccaneers	12	16	0	3	**31**

at Raymond James Stadium, Tampa, Florida

- Date: September 22
- Game time: 4:05 pm. EDT
- Game weather: Cloudy, 88 °F (31 °C)
- Game attendance: 55,070
- Referee: Bill Vinovich
- TV announcers (Fox): Kenny Albert, Ronde Barber, Tiki Barber and Sara Walsh
- Recap, Game Book

Game information

**First quarter**

- TB – Mike Evans 21-yard pass from Jameis Winston (kick failed, wide left), 9:47. Buccaneers 6–0. **Drive: 10 plays, 75 yards, 5:13.**
- NYG – Aldrick Rosas 36-yard field goal, 4:07. Buccaneers 6–3. **Drive: 11 plays, 57 yards, 5:40.**
- TB – Mike Evans 3-yard pass from Jameis Winston (kick blocked), 0:21. Buccaneers 12–3. **Drive: 9 plays, 75 yards, 3:46.**

**Second quarter**

- NYG – Daniel Jones 7-yard run (Aldrick Rosas kick), 9:58. Buccaneers 12–10. **Drive: 12 plays, 75 yards, 5:23.**
- TB – Matt Gay 47-yard field goal, 7:35. Buccaneers 15–10. **Drive: 5 plays, 46 yards, 2:23.**
- TB – Matt Gay 27-yard field goal, 4:06. Buccaneers 18–10. **Drive: 6 plays, 62 yards, 1:55.**
- TB – Mike Evans 20-yard pass from Jameis Winston (Matt Gay kick), 1:26. Buccaneers 25–10. **Drive: 3 plays, 41 yards, 0:49.**
- TB – Matt Gay 52-yard field goal, 0:00. Buccaneers 28–10. **Drive: 6 plays, 46 yards, 0:36.**

**Third quarter**

- NYG – Evan Engram 75-yard pass from Daniel Jones (Daniel Jones–Sterling Shepard pass), 14:48. Buccaneers 28–18. **Drive: 1 play, 75 yards, 0:12.**
- NYG – Sterling Shepard 7-yard pass from Daniel Jones (Aldrick Rosas kick), 8:14. Buccaneers 28–25. **Drive: 8 plays, 80 yards, 3:57.**

**Fourth quarter**

- TB – Matt Gay 23-yard field goal, 6:00. Buccaneers 31–25. **Drive: 8 plays, 37 yards, 4:27.**
- NYG – Daniel Jones 7-yard run (Aldrick Rosas kick), 1:16. Giants 32–31. **Drive: 8 plays, 75 yards, 2:00.**

**Top passers**

- NYG – Daniel Jones – 23/36, 336 yards, 2 TD
- TB – Jameis Winston – 23/37, 380 yards, 3 TD, INT

**Top rushers**

- NYG – Daniel Jones – 4 rushes, 28 yards, 2 TD
- TB – Ronald Jones – 14 rushes, 80 yards

**Top receivers**

- NYG – Evan Engram – 6 receptions, 113 yards, TD
- TB – Mike Evans – 8 receptions, 190 yards, 3 TD

Rookie quarterback Daniel Jones made his first career start ahead of 16-year veteran Eli Manning. The Giants emerged victorious after erasing a 28-10 deficit thanks to 336 passing yards and four total touchdowns from Jones, including the game-winning rushing touchdown on 4th and 5 with 1:16 to play. Tampa Bay still had a chance to win, but Matt Gay missed the game-winning field goal as time expired. With their first win of the 2019 season, the Giants improved to 1–2, though star running back Saquon Barkley left the game after spraining his ankle.

Daniel Jones became the first Giants quarterback since Charlie Conerly in 1948 to have two passing and two rushing touchdowns in the same game. He was named the NFC Offensive Player of the Week for his performance.

==== Week 4: vs. Washington Redskins ====
Week Four: Washington Redskins at New York Giants – Game summary

Quarter	1	2	3	4	Total
Redskins	0	3	0	0	**3**
**Giants**	7	10	7	0	**24**

at MetLife Stadium, East Rutherford, New Jersey

- Date: September 29
- Game time: 1:00 pm. EDT
- Game weather: Fair, 77 °F (25 °C)
- Game attendance: 74,149
- Referee: Alex Kemp
- TV announcers (Fox): Thom Brennaman, Chris Spielman and Shannon Spake
- Recap, Game Book

Game information

**First quarter**

- NYG – Wayne Gallman 6-yard pass from Daniel Jones (Aldrick Rosas kick), 8:45. Giants 7–0. **Drive: 8 plays, 32 yards, 5:15.**

**Second quarter**

- NYG – Wayne Gallman 1-yard run (Aldrick Rosas kick), 12:01. Giants 14–0. **Drive: 13 plays, 94 yards, 6:59.**
- WAS – Dustin Hopkins 21-yard field goal, 2:14. Giants 14–3. **Drive: 11 plays, 34 yards, 4:21.**
- NYG – Aldrick Rosas 30-yard field goal, 0:00. Giants 17–3. **Drive: 10 plays, 63 yards, 2:14.**

**Third quarter**

- NYG – Jabrill Peppers 32-yard interception return (Aldrick Rosas kick), 1:19. Giants 24–3.

**Fourth quarter**

- No scoring plays.

**Top passers**

- WAS – Dwayne Haskins – 9/17, 107 yards, 3 INT
- NYG – Daniel Jones – 23/31, 225 yards, TD, 2 INT

**Top rushers**

- WAS – Adrian Peterson – 11 rushes, 28 yards
- NYG – Wayne Gallman – 18 rushes, 63 yards, TD

**Top receivers**

- WAS – Chris Thompson – 4 receptions, 56 yards
- NYG – Sterling Shepard – 7 receptions, 76 yards

Backup running back Wayne Gallman had two total touchdowns with Saquon Barkley out. Daniel Jones threw one touchdown pass – to Gallman – in his second career win and the Giants improved to 2–2. Safety Jabrill Peppers also picked off Redskins rookie quarterback Dwayne Haskins and scored a touchdown to seal the victory.

==== Week 5: vs. Minnesota Vikings ====
Week Five: Minnesota Vikings at New York Giants – Game summary

Quarter	1	2	3	4	Total
**Vikings**	3	15	7	3	**28**
Giants	0	7	3	0	**10**

at MetLife Stadium, East Rutherford, New Jersey

- Date: October 6
- Game time: 1:00 pm. EDT
- Game weather: Cloudy, 66 °F (19 °C)
- Game attendance: 75,041
- Referee: Clete Blakeman
- TV announcers (Fox): Sam Rosen, Charles Davis and Pam Oliver
- Recap, Game Book

Game information

**First quarter**

- MIN – Dan Bailey 31-yard field goal, 8:46. Vikings 3–0. **Drive: 11 plays, 62 yards, 6:14.**

**Second quarter**

- MIN – Adam Thielen 15-yard pass from Kirk Cousins (Dan Bailey kick), 14:55. Vikings 10–0. **Drive: 11 plays, 98 yards, 5:46.**
- NYG – Darius Slayton 35-yard pass from Daniel Jones (Aldrick Rosas kick), 12:08. Vikings 10–7. **Drive: 5 plays, 50 yards, 2:47.**
- MIN – Dan Bailey 48-yard field goal, 7:51. Vikings 13–7. **Drive: 8 plays, 45 yards, 4:17.**
- MIN – Jon Hilliman tackled in the end zone by Anthony Barr for a safety, 2:09. Vikings 15–7.
- MIN – Dan Bailey 32-yard field goal, 0:47. Vikings 18–7. **Drive: 9 plays, 49 yards, 1:22.**

**Third quarter**

- NYG – Aldrick Rosas 32-yard field goal, 7:35. Vikings 18–10. **Drive: 15 plays, 61 yards, 7:25.**
- MIN – Adam Thielen 9-yard pass from Kirk Cousins (Dan Bailey kick), 4:52. Vikings 25–10. **Drive: 5 plays, 67 yards, 2:43.**

**Fourth quarter**

- MIN – Dan Bailey 45-yard field goal, 4:09. Vikings 28–10. **Drive: 9 plays, 46 yards, 4:52.**

**Top passers**

- MIN – Kirk Cousins – 22/27, 306 yards, 2 TD
- NYG – Daniel Jones – 21/38, 182 yards, TD, INT

**Top rushers**

- MIN – Dalvin Cook – 21 rushes, 132 yards
- NYG – Jon Hilliman – 9 rushes, 20 yards

**Top receivers**

- MIN – Adam Thielen – 7 receptions, 130 yards, 2 TD
- NYG – Darius Slayton – 4 receptions, 62 yards, TD

==== Week 6: at New England Patriots ====
Week Six: New York Giants at New England Patriots – Game summary

Quarter	1	2	3	4	Total
Giants	0	14	0	0	**14**
**Patriots**	7	14	0	14	**35**

at Gillette Stadium, Foxborough, Massachusetts

- Date: October 10
- Game time: 8:20 pm. EDT
- Game weather: Mostly cloudy, 54 °F (12 °C)
- Game attendance: 65,878
- Referee: Brad Allen
- TV announcers (Fox/NFLN/Amazon Prime): Joe Buck, Troy Aikman, Erin Andrews and Kristina Pink
- Recap, Game Book

Game information

**First quarter**

- NE – Chase Winovich 6-yard return of blocked punt (Mike Nugent kick), 1:41. Patriots 7–0.

**Second quarter**

- NE – Brandon Bolden 1-yard run (Mike Nugent kick), 7:11. Patriots 14–0. **Drive: 5 plays, 20 yards, 2:15.**
- NYG – Golden Tate 64-yard pass from Daniel Jones (Aldrick Rosas kick), 6:05. Patriots 14–7. **Drive: 3 plays, 75 yards, 1:06.**
- NYG – Markus Golden 42-yard fumble return (Aldrick Rosas kick), 4:38. Tied 14–14.
- NE – Tom Brady 1-yard run (Mike Nugent kick), 0:36. Patriots 21–14. **Drive: 11 plays, 75 yards, 4:02.**

**Third quarter**

- No scoring plays.

**Fourth quarter**

- NE – Kyle Van Noy 22-yard fumble return (Mike Nugent kick), 8:33. Patriots 28–14.
- NE – Tom Brady 1-yard run (Mike Nugent kick), 3:49. Patriots 35–14. **Drive: 7 plays, 63 yards, 3:09.**

**Top passers**

- NYG – Daniel Jones – 15/31, 161 yards, TD, 3 INT
- NE – Tom Brady – 31/41, 334 yards, INT

**Top rushers**

- NYG – Jon Hilliman – 11 rushes, 38 yards
- NE – Sony Michel – 22 rushes, 86 yards

**Top receivers**

- NYG – Golden Tate – 6 receptions, 102 yards, TD
- NE – Julian Edelman – 9 receptions, 113 yards

Daniel Jones connected with wide receiver Golden Tate on a 64-yard strike, which was the first passing touchdown the Patriots allowed in 2019. Second year linebacker Lorenzo Carter stripped Tom Brady which the Giants scored on the ensuing fumble tying the game 14–14. Both teams showed off stout defensive play as both offenses struggled to gain any traction moving the ball through the first 3 quarters until the Patriots broke through in the 4th and iced the game 35–14.

==== Week 7: vs. Arizona Cardinals ====
Week Seven: Arizona Cardinals at New York Giants – Game summary

Quarter	1	2	3	4	Total
**Cardinals**	14	3	7	3	**27**
Giants	0	14	0	7	**21**

at MetLife Stadium, East Rutherford, New Jersey

- Date: October 20
- Game time: 1:00 pm. EDT
- Game weather: Light rain, 56 °F (13 °C)
- Game attendance: 73,577
- Referee: Adrian Hill
- TV announcers (Fox): Kenny Albert, Greg Olsen and Lindsay Czarniak
- Recap, Game Book

Game information

**First quarter**

- ARI – Chase Edmonds 20-yard run (Zane Gonzalez kick), 8:14. Cardinals 7–0. **Drive: 13 plays, 75 yards, 6:46.**
- ARI – Chase Edmonds 20-yard run (Zane Gonzalez kick), 4:15. Cardinals 14–0. **Drive: 3 plays, 32 yards, 1:23.**

**Second quarter**

- ARI – Zane Gonzalez 47-yard field goal, 13:30. Cardinals 17–0. **Drive: 9 plays, 54 yards, 4:29.**
- NYG – Rhett Ellison 28-yard pass from Daniel Jones (Aldrick Rosas kick), 11:28. Cardinals 17–7. **Drive: 4 plays, 79 yards, 2:02.**
- NYG – Elijhaa Penny blocked punt recovery in end zone (Aldrick Rosas kick), 9:52. Cardinals 17–14.

**Third quarter**

- ARI – Chase Edmonds 22-yard run (Zane Gonzalez kick), 6:05. Cardinals 24–14. **Drive: 3 plays, 51 yards, 1:21.**

**Fourth quarter**

- NYG – Saquon Barkley 7-yard run (Aldrick Rosas kick), 8:13. Cardinals 24–21. **Drive: 8 plays, 82 yards, 4:44.**
- ARI – Zane Gonzalez 35-yard field goal, 2:09. Cardinals 27–21. **Drive: 4 plays, 0 yards, 0:19.**

**Top passers**

- ARI – Kyler Murray – 14/21, 104 yards
- NYG – Daniel Jones – 22/35, 223 yards, TD, INT

**Top rushers**

- ARI – Chase Edmonds – 27 rushes, 126 yards, 3 TD
- NYG – Saquon Barkley – 18 rushes, 72 yards, TD

**Top receivers**

- ARI – Pharoh Cooper – 4 receptions, 29 yards
- NYG – Golden Tate – 6 receptions, 80 yards

Despite Saquon Barkley returning from injury, the Giants quickly fell in a 17–0 deficit which proved to be too much to overcome despite clawing back in the game. Backup running back Chase Edmonds scored 3 touchdowns for the Cardinals in the loss and the Giants fell to 2–5.

==== Week 8: at Detroit Lions ====
Week Eight: New York Giants at Detroit Lions – Game summary

Quarter	1	2	3	4	Total
Giants	0	13	6	7	**26**
**Lions**	14	3	7	7	**31**

at Ford Field, Detroit, Michigan

- Date: October 27
- Game time: 1:00 pm. EDT
- Game weather: None (indoor stadium)
- Game attendance: 58,509
- Referee: Scott Novak
- TV announcers (Fox): Kenny Albert, Charles Davis and Pam Oliver
- Recap, Game Book

Game information

**First quarter**

- DET – Devon Kennard 13-yard fumble return (Matt Prater kick), 7:12. Lions 7–0.
- DET – Marvin Hall 49-yard pass from Matthew Stafford (Matt Prater kick), 2:31. Lions 14–0. **Drive: 6 plays, 71 yards, 3:01.**

**Second quarter**

- NYG – Darius Slayton 22-yard pass from Daniel Jones (Aldrick Rosas kick), 12:27. Lions 14–7. **Drive: 10 plays, 88 yards, 5:04.**
- NYG – Darius Slayton 28-yard pass from Daniel Jones (kick failed), 4:39. Lions 14–13. **Drive: 8 plays, 57 yards, 3:30.**
- DET – Matt Prater 52-yard field goal, 0:20. Lions 17–13. **Drive: 14 plays, 41 yards, 4:19.**

**Third quarter**

- DET – Kenny Golladay 9-yard pass from Matthew Stafford (Matt Prater kick), 9:51. Lions 24–13. **Drive: 10 plays, 75 yards, 5:09.**
- NYG – Evan Engram 2-yard pass from Daniel Jones (pass failed), 4:54. Lions 24–19. **Drive: 10 plays, 78 yards, 4:57.**

**Fourth quarter**

- DET – Kenny Golladay 41-yard pass from Matthew Stafford (Matt Prater kick), 12:12. Lions 31–19. **Drive: 5 plays, 80 yards, 2:34.**
- NYG – Saquon Barkley 4-yard pass from Daniel Jones (Aldrick Rosas kick), 1:19. Lions 31–26. **Drive: 4 plays, 50 yards, 1:02.**

**Top passers**

- NYG – Daniel Jones – 28/41, 322 yards, 4 TD
- DET – Matthew Stafford – 24/32, 342 yards, 3 TD, INT

**Top rushers**

- NYG – Saquon Barkley – 19 rushes, 64 yards
- DET – Tra Carson – 12 rushes, 34 yards

**Top receivers**

- NYG – Golden Tate – 8 receptions, 85 yards
- DET – Kenny Golladay – 6 receptions, 123 yards, 2 TD

Daniel Jones threw 4 touchdown passes for the first time in his career, but had a key fumble in the 2nd quarter which former Giant Devon Kennard scored on. The defense also had few answers for Matthew Stafford, and the Giants fell to 2–6.

==== Week 9: vs. Dallas Cowboys ====
Week Nine: Dallas Cowboys at New York Giants – Game summary

Quarter	1	2	3	4	Total
**Cowboys**	3	10	3	21	**37**
Giants	3	9	3	3	**18**

at MetLife Stadium, East Rutherford, New Jersey

- Date: November 4
- Game time: 8:15 pm. EST
- Game weather: Fair, 51 °F (11 °C)
- Game attendance: 76,107
- Referee: Clay Martin
- TV announcers (ESPN): Joe Tessitore, Booger McFarland, Lisa Salters and John Parry
- Recap, Game Book

Game information

**First quarter**

- NYG – Aldrick Rosas 21-yard field goal, 13:23. Giants 3–0. **Drive: 4 plays, 5 yards, 1:26.**
- DAL – Brett Maher 35-yard field goal, 8:19. Tied 3–3. **Drive: 11 plays, 58 yards, 5:04.**

**Second quarter**

- NYG – Cody Latimer 1-yard pass from Daniel Jones) (kick failed), 11:55. Giants 9–3. **Drive: 10 plays, 56 yards, 5:14.**
- NYG – Aldrick Rosas 25-yard field goal, 2:50. Giants 12–3. **Drive: 12 plays, 73 yards, 6:26.**
- DAL – Blake Jarwin 42-yard pass from Dak Prescott, (Brett Maher kick), 0:52. Giants 12–10. **Drive: 6 plays, 75 yards, 1:58.**
- DAL – Brett Maher 52-yard field goal, 0:00. Cowboys 13–12. **Drive: 4 plays, 5 yards, 0:25.**

**Third quarter**

- DAL – Brett Maher 28-yard field goal, 4:43. Cowboys 16–12. **Drive: 7 plays, 39 yards, 2:50.**
- NYG – Aldrick Rosas 26-yard field goal, 0:27. Cowboys 16–15. **Drive: 8 plays, 44 yards, 4:16.**

**Fourth quarter**

- DAL – Michael Gallup 15-yard pass from Dak Prescott (Brett Maher kick), 12:40. Cowboys 23–15. **Drive: 9 plays, 75 yards, 2:47.**
- NYG – Aldrick Rosas 29-yard field goal, 11:50. Cowboys 23–18. **Drive: 5 plays, 65 yards, 0:50.**
- DAL – Amari Cooper 45-yard pass from Dak Prescott (Brett Maher kick), 7:56. Cowboys 30–18. **Drive: 8 plays, 89 yards, 3:54.**
- DAL – Jourdan Lewis 63-yard fumble return (Brett Maher kick), 0:06. Cowboys 37–18.

**Top passers**

- DAL – Dak Prescott – 22/35, 257 yards, 3 TD, INT
- NYG – Daniel Jones – 26/41, 210 yards, TD, INT

**Top rushers**

- DAL – Ezekiel Elliott – 23 rushes, 139 yards
- NYG – Daniel Jones – 6 rushes, 54 yards

**Top receivers**

- DAL – Amari Cooper – 4 receptions, 80 yards, TD
- NYG – Saquon Barkley – 6 receptions, 67 yards

The Giants fell to 2–7 and lost their 6th consecutive game to the Cowboys. This game is famous for being interrupted by a stray black cat in the 2nd quarter, which the media pointed out put a hex on both the Giants and the Cowboys. The Giants blew a 12–3 lead and would go 2–6 in their second half of the season, while the Cowboys squandered their 5–3 record after this game, going 3–5 the rest of the season to finish 8–8 and miss the playoffs. Cowboys head coach Jason Garrett was not retained by the Cowboys for the 2020 season and was subsequently hired as the Giants offensive coordinator.

==== Week 10: at New York Jets ====
Week Ten: New York Giants at New York Jets – Game summary

Quarter	1	2	3	4	Total
Giants	0	13	14	0	**27**
**Jets**	14	0	10	10	**34**

at MetLife Stadium, East Rutherford, New Jersey

- Date: November 10
- Game time: 1:00 pm. EST
- Game weather: Cloudy, 48 °F (9 °C)
- Game attendance: 78,523
- Referee: John Hussey
- TV announcers (Fox): Kenny Albert, Ronde Barber and Lindsay Czarniak
- Recap, Game Book

Game information

**First quarter**

- NYJ – Sam Darnold 2-yard run (Sam Ficken kick), 7:21. Jets 7–0. **Drive: 13 plays, 75 yards, 7:39.**
- NYJ – Jamison Crowder 23-yard pass from Sam Darnold (Sam Ficken kick), 1:35. Jets 14–0. **Drive: 9 plays, 50 yards, 4:05.**

**Second quarter**

- NYG – Darius Slayton 5-yard pass from Daniel Jones (Aldrick Rosas kick), 12:26. Jets 14–7. **Drive: 8 plays, 75 yards, 4:09.**
- NYG – Darius Slayton 39-yard pass from Daniel Jones (pass failed), 5:24. Jets 14–13. **Drive: 7 plays, 61 yards, 4:05.**

**Third quarter**

- NYJ – Jamal Adams 25-yard fumble return (Sam Ficken kick), 14:13. Jets 21–13.
- NYG – Golden Tate 61-yard pass from Daniel Jones (kick failed), 11:51. Jets 21–19. **Drive: 5 plays, 75 yards, 2:22.**
- NYG – Golden Tate 15-yard pass from Daniel Jones (Daniel Jones – Bennie Fowler pass). Giants 27–21. **Drive: 9 plays, 64 yards, 5:01.**
- NYJ – Sam Ficken 53-yard field goal, 1:42. Giants 27–24. **Drive: 9 plays, 46 yards, 3:39.**

**Fourth quarter**

- NYJ – Le'Veon Bell 1-yard run (Sam Ficken kick), 14:52. Jets 31–27. **Drive: 3 plays, 70 yards, 1:01.**
- NYJ – Sam Ficken 35-yard field goal, 7:36. Jets 34–27. **Drive: 8 plays, 76 yards, 4:27.**

**Top passers**

- NYG – Daniel Jones – 26/40, 308 yards, 4 TD
- NYJ – Sam Darnold – 19/30, 230 yards, TD

**Top rushers**

- NYG – Daniel Jones – 3 rushes, 20 yards
- NYJ – Le'Veon Bell – 18 rushes, 34 yards

**Top receivers**

- NYG – Darius Slayton – 10 receptions, 121 yards
- NYJ – Demaryius Thomas – 6 receptions, 84 yards

Like with Detroit, Daniel Jones threw for 4 touchdown passes but was stripped on a key play where Jamal Adams scored for the Jets. The Giants defense blew a 4th quarter lead and as a result, secured both their second straight loss to the Jets and their first road loss to the Jets since 1988.

==== Week 12: at Chicago Bears ====
Week Twelve: New York Giants at Chicago Bears – Game summary

Quarter	1	2	3	4	Total
Giants	0	7	0	7	**14**
**Bears**	0	3	16	0	**19**

at Soldier Field, Chicago, Illinois

- Date: November 24
- Game time: 1:00 pm. EST/12:00 pm. CST
- Game weather: Mostly sunny, 48 °F (9 °C)
- Game attendance: 61,581
- Referee: Shawn Hochuli
- TV announcers (Fox): Thom Brennaman, Chris Spielman and Shannon Spake
- Recap, Game Book

Game information

**First quarter**

- No scoring plays.

**Second quarter**

- NYG – Kaden Smith 3-yard pass from Daniel Jones (Aldrick Rosas kick), 7:38. Giants 7–0. **Drive: 6 plays, 42 yards, 3:24.**
- CHI – Eddy Pineiro 26-yard field goal, 0:08. Giants 7–3. **Drive: 9 plays, 59 yards, 1:47.**

**Third quarter**

- CHI – Allen Robinson 32-yard pass from Mitch Trubisky (Eddy Pineiro kick), 12:12. Bears 10–7. **Drive: 5 plays, 60 yards, 2:48.**
- CHI – Eddy Pineiro 24-yard field goal, 7:09. Bears 13–7. **Drive: 8 plays, 88 yards, 2:38.**
- CHI – Mitch Trubisky 2-yard run (kick failed), 5:19. Bears 19–7. **Drive: 3 plays, 3 yards, 1:35.**

**Fourth quarter**

- NYG – Golden Tate 23-yard pass from Daniel Jones (Aldrick Rosas kick), 4:10. Bears 19–14. **Drive: 11 plays, 97 yards, 4:55.**

**Top passers**

- NYG – Daniel Jones – 21/36, 150 yards, 2 TD
- CHI – Mitch Trubisky – 25/41, 278 yards, TD, 2 INT

**Top rushers**

- NYG – Saquon Barkley – 17 rushes, 59 yards
- CHI – Tarik Cohen – 6 rushes, 25 yards

**Top receivers**

- NYG – Darius Slayton – 4 receptions, 67 yards
- CHI – Allen Robinson – 6 receptions, 131 yards, TD

==== Week 13: vs. Green Bay Packers ====
Week Thirteen: Green Bay Packers at New York Giants – Game summary

Quarter	1	2	3	4	Total
**Packers**	14	3	0	14	**31**
Giants	7	3	3	0	**13**

at MetLife Stadium, East Rutherford, New Jersey

- Date: December 1
- Game time: 1:00 pm. EST
- Game weather: Rain, Snow 32 °F (0 °C)
- Game attendance: 75,950
- Referee: Craig Wrolstad
- TV announcers (Fox): Thom Brennaman, Chris Spielman and Shannon Spake
- Recap, Game Book

Game information

**First quarter**

- GB – Davante Adams 8-yard pass from Aaron Rodgers (Mason Crosby kick), 8:43. Packers 7–0. **Drive: 7 plays, 72 yards, 3:54.**
- NYG – Sterling Shepard 18-yard pass from Daniel Jones (Aldrick Rosas kick), 3:16. Tied 7–7. **Drive: 11 plays, 71 yards, 5:27.**
- GB – Allen Lazard 37-yard pass from Aaron Rodgers (Mason Crosby kick), 1:15. Packers 14–7. **Drive: 5 plays, 66 yards, 2:01.**

**Second quarter**

- GB – Mason Crosby 47-yard field goal, 12:02. Packers 17–7. **Drive: 7 plays, 24 yards, 2:36.**
- NYG – Aldrick Rosas 27-yard field goal, 2:31. Packers 17–10. **Drive: 18 plays, 61 yards, 9:31.**

**Third quarter**

- NYG – Aldrick Rosas 45-yard field goal, 6:37. Packers 17–13. **Drive: 10 plays, 52 yards, 5:11.**

**Fourth quarter**

- GB – Davante Adams 17-yard pass from Aaron Rodgers (Mason Crosby kick), 14:22. Packers 24–13. **Drive: 14 plays, 74 yards, 7:15.**
- GB – Marcedes Lewis 1-yard pass from Aaron Rodgers (Mason Crosby kick), 7:05. Packers 31–13. **Drive: 8 plays, 28 yards, 3:55.**

**Top passers**

- GB – Aaron Rodgers – 21/33, 243 yards, 4 TD
- NYG – Daniel Jones – 20/37, 240 yards, TD, 3 INT

**Top rushers**

- GB – Jamaal Williams – 10 rushes, 41 yards
- NYG – Saquon Barkley – 19 rushes, 83 yards

**Top receivers**

- GB – Allen Lazard – 3 receptions, 103 yards, TD
- NYG – Kaden Smith – 6 receptions, 70 yards

With the loss, the Giants were swept by the NFC North and they were eliminated from playoff contention for the third straight season. Daniel Jones threw 3 interceptions and suffered an ankle injury. The 8th straight loss marked their longest losing streak since 2004.

==== Week 14: at Philadelphia Eagles ====
Week Fourteen: New York Giants at Philadelphia Eagles – Game summary

Quarter	1	2	3	4	OT	Total
Giants	0	17	0	0	0	**17**
**Eagles**	0	3	7	7	6	**23**

at Lincoln Financial Field, Philadelphia, Pennsylvania

- Date: December 9
- Game time: 8:15 pm. EST
- Game weather: Rain, 53 °F (12 °C)
- Game attendance: 69,796
- Referee: Scott Novak
- TV announcers (ESPN): Joe Tessitore, Booger McFarland and Lisa Salters
- Recap, Game Book

Game information

**First quarter**

- No scoring plays.

**Second quarter**

- NYG – Darius Slayton 35-yard pass from Eli Manning (Aldrick Rosas kick), 14:52. Giants 7–0. **Drive: 7 plays, 57 yards, 3:05.**
- PHI – Jake Elliott 34-yard field goal, 9:33. Giants 7–3. **Drive: 9 plays, 59 yards, 5:19.**
- NYG – Aldrick Rosas 34-yard field goal, 5:30. Giants 10–3. **Drive: 9 plays, 59 yards, 4:03.**
- NYG – Darius Slayton 55-yard pass from Eli Manning (Aldrick Rosas kick), 0:27. Giants 17–3. **Drive: 6 plays, 84 yards, 1:19.**

**Third quarter**

- PHI – Boston Scott 2-yard run (Jake Elliott kick), 1:28. Giants 17–10. **Drive: 10 plays, 58 yards, 5:39.**

**Fourth quarter**

- PHI – Zach Ertz 2-yard pass from Carson Wentz (Jake Elliott kick), 1:53. Tied 17–17. **Drive: 14 plays, 85 yards, 6:17.**

**Overtime**

- PHI – Zach Ertz 2-yard pass from Carson Wentz, 5:10. Eagles 23–17. **Drive: 8 plays, 75 yards, 4:50.**

**Top passers**

- NYG – Eli Manning – 15/30, 203 yards, 2 TD
- PHI – Carson Wentz – 33/50, 325 yards, 2 TD

**Top rushers**

- NYG – Saquon Barkley – 17 rushes, 66 yards
- PHI – Miles Sanders – 15 rushes, 45 yards

**Top receivers**

- NYG – Darius Slayton – 5 receptions, 154 yards, 2 TD
- PHI – Zach Ertz – 9 receptions, 91 yards, 2 TD

Week 14 featured Eli Manning taking over for an injured Daniel Jones against the injury-ravaged Philadelphia Eagles. Following a scoreless first quarter, Manning delivered a 35-yard touchdown pass to Darius Slayton on the first play of the second to put New York up 7–0. After the teams traded field goals, Manning would throw another touchdown pass to Slayton, this time from 55 yards, to build the Giants' lead to 17–3 before halftime. However, the offense would fall silent in the second half, going three-and-out on four of six possessions and putting up just 30 yards of total offense. The Eagles would take advantage and score 14 unanswered points over the final two-quarters to force overtime. After the Eagles won the overtime coin toss, the Giants defense failed to slow Philadelphia down, and the Eagles prevailed on Carson Wentz's second touchdown pass of the night to Zach Ertz. With this loss, the Giants dropped to 2–11 on the year, and matched a franchise-worst nine-game losing streak set in 1976. Furthermore, the loss marked the first time that the Giants trailed the Eagles in their all-time series. It also marked the first time since 2006 an Eagles-Giants game went to overtime.

==== Week 15: vs. Miami Dolphins ====
Week Fifteen: Miami Dolphins at New York Giants – Game summary

Quarter	1	2	3	4	Total
Dolphins	0	10	3	7	**20**
**Giants**	0	7	16	13	**36**

at MetLife Stadium, East Rutherford, New Jersey

- Date: December 15
- Game time: 1:00 pm. EST
- Game weather: Cloudy, 48 °F (9 °C)
- Game attendance: 72,894
- Referee: Jerome Boger
- TV announcers (CBS): Spero Dedes and Adam Archuleta
- Recap, Game Book

Game information

**First quarter**

- No Scoring plays

**Second quarter**

- MIA – DeVante Parker 20-yard pass from Ryan Fitzpatrick (Jason Sanders kick), 9:03. Dolphins 7–0. **Drive: 9 plays, 89 yards, 5:44.**
- NYG – Golden Tate 51-yard pass from Eli Manning (Aldrick Rosas kick), 8:01. Tied 7–7. **Drive: 3 plays, 75 yards, 1:92.**
- MIA – Jason Sanders 24-yard field goal, 0:44. Dolphins 10–7. **Drive: 7 plays, 22 yards, 0:36.**

**Third quarter**

- NYG – Darius Slayton 5-yard pass from Eli Manning (Aldrick Rosas kick), 11:53. Giants 14–10. **Drive: 6 plays, 70 yards, 3:07.**
- MIA – Jason Sanders 47-yard field goal, 8:44. Giants 14–13. **Drive: 5 plays, 22 yards, 1:23.**
- NYG – Patrick Laird tackled in end zone by Sam Beal for a safety. Giants 16–13.
- NYG – Saquon Barkley 1-yard run (Aldrick Rosas kick), 5:17. Giants 23–13. **Drive: 3 plays, 40 yards, 1:03.**

**Fourth quarter**

- NYG – Saquon Barkley 10-yard run (Aldrick Rosas kick), 14:54. Giants 30–13. **Drive: 8 plays, 66 yards, 4:19.**
- NYG – Javorius Allen 1-yard run (kick failed), 4:41. Giants 36–13. **Drive: 5 plays, 44 yards, 1:54.**
- MIA – DeVante Parker 29-yard pass from Ryan Fitzpatrick (Jason Sanders kick), 1:54. Giants 36–20. **Drive: 8 plays, 75 yards, 2:47.**

**Top passers**

- NYG – Eli Manning – 20/28, 283 yards, 2 TD, 3 INT
- MIA – Ryan Fitzpatrick – 23/41, 279 yards, 2 TD

**Top rushers**

- NYG – Saquon Barkley – 24 rushes, 112 yards, 2 TD
- MIA – Patrick Laird – 12 rushes, 46 yards

**Top receivers**

- NYG – Sterling Shepard – 9 receptions, 111 yards
- MIA – DeVante Parker – 4 receptions, 72 yards, 2 TD

With the win, the Giants snapped their nine-game losing streak and improved to 3–11 in Eli Manning's final NFL game. He threw his final touchdown to rookie Darius Slayton and his final pass, a completion to Sterling Shepard. He was removed from the game by backup Alex Tanney to a standing ovation from the fans and family in attendance. Manning would later announce his retirement on January 22, 2020, and had his number retired by the Giants in 2021.

Manning finished his professional football career, all 16 years with the Giants, with a 117–117 record as a starter and 8–4 in playoff games. His 4,895/8,119 with 57,023 passing yards, 366 touchdowns and 244 interceptions are all franchise records. He also retired 7th in NFL history in passing yards and touchdown passes.

==== Week 16: at Washington Redskins ====
Week Sixteen: New York Giants at Washington Redskins – Game summary

Quarter	1	2	3	4	OT	Total
**Giants**	14	14	7	0	6	**41**
Redskins	7	7	7	14	0	**35**

at FedEx Field, Landover, Maryland

- Date: December 22
- Game time: 1:00 pm. EST
- Game weather: Clear, 44 °F (7 °C)
- Game attendance: 66,083
- Referee: Ronald Torbert
- TV announcers (Fox): Thom Brennaman, Chris Spielman and Shannon Spake
- Recap, Game Book

Game information

**First quarter**

- NYG – Sterling Shepard 23-yard pass from Daniel Jones (Aldrick Rosas kick), 12:21. Giants 7–0. **Drive: 5 plays, 75 yards, 2:39.**
- WAS – Steven Sims 10-yard pass from Dwayne Haskins (Dustin Hopkins kick), 7:37. Tied 7–7. **Drive: 9 plays, 75 yards, 4:44.**
- NYG – Saquon Barkley 67-yard run (Aldrick Rosas kick), 6:46. Giants 14–7. **Drive: 2 plays, 75 yards, 0:51.**

**Second quarter**

- WAS – Hale Hentges 6-yard pass from Dwayne Haskins (Dustin Hopkins kick), 14:56. Tied 14–14. **Drive: 12 plays, 75 yards, 6:50.**
- NYG – Saquon Barkley 33-yard pass from Daniel Jones (Aldrick Rosas kick), 9:16. Giants 21–14. **Drive: 10 plays, 75 yards, 5:40.**
- NYG – Cody Latimer 10-yard pass from Daniel Jones (Aldrick Rosas kick), 0:38. Giants 28–14. **Drive: 9 plays, 73 yards, 1:41.**

**Third quarter**

- WAS – Steven Sims 7-yard pass from Case Keenum (Dustin Hopkins kick), 6:38. Giants 28–21. **Drive: 7 plays, 60 yards, 3:41.**
- NYG – Kaden Smith 9-yard pass from Daniel Jones (Aldrick Rosas kick), 3:40. Giants 35–21. **Drive: 5 plays, 73 yards, 2:58.**

**Fourth quarter**

- WAS – Adrian Peterson 1-yard run (Dustin Hopkins kick), 14:30. Giants 35–28. **Drive: 1 play, 17 yards, 0:08.**
- WAS – Case Keenum 1-yard run (Dustin Hopkins kick), 0:29. Tied 35–35. **Drive: 14 plays, 99 yards, 5:59.**

**Overtime**

- NYG – Kaden Smith 3-yard pass from Daniel Jones, 4:15. Giants 41–35. **Drive: 11 plays, 66 yards, 5:45.**

**Top passers**

- NYG – Daniel Jones – 28/42, 352 yards, 5 TD
- WAS – Case Keenum – 16/22, 158 yards, 2 TD

**Top rushers**

- NYG – Saquon Barkley – 22 rushes, 189 yards, TD
- WAS – Adrian Peterson – 15 rushes, 36 yards, TD

**Top receivers**

- NYG – Golden Tate – 6 receptions, 96 yards
- WAS – Terry McLaurin – 7 receptions, 86 yards

Because Joe Burrow was a shoo-in to be drafted 1st overall to the Cincinnati Bengals, this was informally known as the Chase Young Bowl as both the Giants and Redskins were still in the running to pick 2nd. With Daniel Jones back in the lineup for New York, the Giants withstood a late rally by the rival Redskins and improved to 4–11 with the overtime victory. Daniel Jones became the first rookie quarterback in NFL history to throw for 300 yards, 5 touchdowns, and no turnovers in a single game. The win also made the Giants finish in third place in the NFC East, marking the first time since 2016 in which the Giants did not finish last in the division. This was the last time Washington played against the Giants as the Redskins, as they would change their name before the 2020 season. Washington ended up selecting defensive end Chase Young with the 2nd overall pick in the 2020 NFL draft, and the Giants selected offensive tackle Andrew Thomas with the 4th overall pick.

==== Week 17: vs. Philadelphia Eagles ====
Week Seventeen: Philadelphia Eagles at New York Giants – Game summary

Quarter	1	2	3	4	Total
**Eagles**	3	7	7	17	**34**
Giants	0	3	14	0	**17**

at MetLife Stadium, East Rutherford, New Jersey

- Date: December 29
- Game time: 4:25 pm. EST
- Game weather: Rain, 42 °F (6 °C)
- Game attendance: 75,029
- Referee: Alex Kemp
- TV announcers (Fox): Thom Brennaman, Chris Spielman and Shannon Spake
- Recap, Game Book

Game information

**First quarter**

- PHI – Jake Elliott 31-yard field goal, 3:39. Eagles 3–0. **Drive: 9 plays, 69 yards, 4:19.**

**Second quarter**

- NYG – Aldrick Rosas 37-yard field goal, 5:16. Tied 3–3. **Drive: 7 plays, 67 yards, 2:10.**
- PHI – Joshua Perkins 24-yard pass from Carson Wentz (Jake Elliott kick), 1:52. Eagles 10–3. **Drive: 8 plays, 75 yards, 3:24.**

**Third quarter**

- NYG – Golden Tate 20-yard pass from Daniel Jones (Aldrick Rosas kick), 9:41. Tied 10–10. 'Drive: 10 plays, 76 yards, 5:19.
- PHI – Boston Scott 7-yard run (Jake Elliott kick), 2:21. Eagles 17–10. **Drive: 9 plays, 62 yards, 3:11.**
- NYG – Saquon Barkley 68-yard run (Aldrick Rosas kick), 2:05. Tied 17–17. **Drive: 1 play, 68 yards, 0:16.**

**Fourth quarter**

- PHI – Jake Elliott 50-yard field goal, 13:58. Eagles 20–17. **Drive: 8 plays, 43 yards, 3:07.**
- PHI – Boston Scott 2-yard run (Jake Elliott kick), 13:00. Eagles 27–17. **Drive: 1 play, 2 yards, 0:03.**
- PHI – Boston Scott 2-yard run (Jake Elliott kick), 6:14. Eagles 34–17. **Drive: 4 plays, 38 yards, 1:39.**

**Top passers**

- PHI – Carson Wentz – 23/40, 289 yards, TD
- NYG – Daniel Jones – 28/47, 301 yards, TD, INT

**Top rushers**

- PHI – Boston Scott – 19 rushes, 54 yards, 3 TD
- NYG – Saquon Barkley – 17 rushes, 92 yards, TD

**Top receivers**

- PHI – Boston Scott – 4 receptions, 84 yards
- NYG – Kaden Smith – 8 receptions, 98 yards

Head coach Pat Shurmur was fired the following day along with most of his staff. Shurmur finished with a 9–23 record in his two seasons coaching the team. His .281 winning percentage is second worst in Giants franchise history.

=== Standings ===
==== Division ====
NFC East
	W	L	T	PCT	DIV	CONF	PF	PA	STK
^{(4)} Philadelphia Eagles	9	7	0	.563	5–1	7–5	385	354	W4
Dallas Cowboys	8	8	0	.500	5–1	7–5	434	321	W1
New York Giants	4	12	0	.250	2–4	3–9	341	451	L1
Washington Redskins	3	13	0	.188	0–6	2–10	266	435	L4

==== Conference ====
NFC
#	Team	Division	W	L	T	PCT	DIV	CONF	SOS	SOV	STK
**Division leaders**
1 (Note: San Francisco finished ahead of Green Bay and New Orleans based on head-to-head sweep, claiming the No. 1 seed.)	San Francisco 49ers	West	13	3	0	.813	5–1	10–2	.504	.466	W2
2 (Note: Green Bay claimed the No. 2 seed over New Orleans based on conference record.)	Green Bay Packers	North	13	3	0	.813	6–0	10–2	.453	.428	W5
3	New Orleans Saints	South	13	3	0	.813	5–1	9–3	.486	.459	W3
4	Philadelphia Eagles	East	9	7	0	.563	5–1	7–5	.455	.417	W4
**Wild Cards**
5	Seattle Seahawks	West	11	5	0	.688	3–3	8–4	.531	.463	L2
6	Minnesota Vikings	North	10	6	0	.625	2–4	7–5	.477	.356	L2
**Did not qualify for the postseason**
7	Los Angeles Rams	West	9	7	0	.563	3–3	7–5	.535	.438	W1
8 (Note: Chicago finished ahead of Dallas based on head-to-head victory.)	Chicago Bears	North	8	8	0	.500	4–2	7–5	.508	.383	W1
9	Dallas Cowboys	East	8	8	0	.500	5–1	7–5	.479	.316	W1
10 (Note: Atlanta finished ahead of Tampa Bay based on division record.)	Atlanta Falcons	South	7	9	0	.438	4–2	6–6	.545	.518	W4
11	Tampa Bay Buccaneers	South	7	9	0	.438	2–4	5–7	.500	.384	L2
12	Arizona Cardinals	West	5	10	1	.344	1–5	3–8–1	.529	.375	L1
13	Carolina Panthers	South	5	11	0	.313	1–5	2–10	.549	.469	L8
14	New York Giants	East	4	12	0	.250	2–4	3–9	.473	.281	L1
15	Detroit Lions	North	3	12	1	.219	0–6	2–9–1	.506	.375	L9
16	Washington Redskins	East	3	13	0	.188	0–6	2–10	.502	.281	L4
**Tiebreakers** (Note: When breaking ties for three or more teams under the NFL's rules, they are first broken within divisions, then comparing only the highest-ranked remaining team from each division.)

== Regular season statistical leaders ==
	Player(s)	Value	NFL Rank	NFC Rank
Passing yards	Daniel Jones	3,027 Yards	24th	13th
Passing touchdowns	Daniel Jones	24 TDs	T-13th	10th
Rushing yards	Saquon Barkley	1,003 Yards	16th	6th
Rushing touchdowns	Saquon Barkley	6 TDs	T-20th	T-9th
Receptions	Sterling Shepard	57 Receptions	T-56th	T-32nd
Receiving yards	Darius Slayton	740 Yards	48th	26th
Receiving touchdowns	Darius Slayton	8 TDs	T-9th	T-7th
Points	Aldrick Rosas	71 Points	37th	21st
Kickoff Return Yards	Cody Latimer	570 Yards	8th	4th
Punt return Yards	Golden Tate	97 Yards	28th	11th
Tackles	Antoine Bethea	110 Tackles	T-27th	T-15th
Sacks	Markus Golden	10.0 Sacks	T-15th	T-10th
Interceptions	Janoris Jenkins	4 INTs	T-12th	T-3rd
