= Nate Wozniak =

American football player (born 1994)

No. 79, 68
- Position: Offensive tackle

Personal information
- Born: August 30, 1994 (age 32); Greenwood, Indiana
- Listed height: 6 ft 10 in (2.08 m)
- Listed weight: 280 lb (127 kg)

Career information
- High school: Center Grove (Greenwood, Indiana)
- College: Minnesota
- NFL draft: 2018: undrafted

Career history
- New Orleans Saints (2018–2019)*; Minnesota Vikings (2019)*; Atlanta Falcons (2019)*; New Orleans Saints (2019)*; New York Giants (2019–2020)*
- * Offseason or practice squad member only
- Stats at Pro Football Reference

Nate Wozniak (born August 30, 1994) is an American former football offensive tackle. He played college football at Minnesota.

== College career ==
At Minnesota, he primarily played tight end and caught 28 passes for 314 yards over the final three seasons of college.

== Professional career ==
Pre-draft measurables
Height	Weight	Arm length	Hand span	40-yard dash	10-yard split	20-yard split	20-yard shuttle	Three-cone drill	Vertical jump	Broad jump	Bench press
6 ft 9 5/8 in (2.07 m)	268 lb (122 kg)	34 1/8 in (0.87 m)	10 in (0.25 m)	5.10 s	1.88 s	2.96 s	4.80 s	7.53 s	32.0 in (0.81 m)	9 ft 3 in (2.82 m)	16 reps
All values from Pro Day

At Minnesota's Pro Day, Wozniak ran the 40-yard dash in 5.1 seconds, bench pressed 225 pounds 16 times and posted a 32-inch vertical leap.

=== New Orleans Saints ===
After going undrafted in the 2018 NFL draft, Wozniak was signed by the New Orleans Saints on May 3, 2018, where he was eventually moved to offensive tackle. He was waived by the Saints on September 1, 2018, and was signed to the practice squad the next day. He signed a reserve/future contract with the Saints on January 21, 2019. He was waived on August 7, 2019.

=== Minnesota Vikings ===
On August 11, 2019, Wozniak was signed by the Minnesota Vikings. He was waived on August 31, 2019.

=== Atlanta Falcons ===
On September 17, 2019, Wozniak was signed to the Atlanta Falcons practice squad. He was released on September 26.

=== New Orleans Saints (second stint) ===
On December 4, 2019, Wozniak was signed to the New Orleans Saints practice squad. He was released on December 12.

=== New York Giants ===
On December 17, 2019, Wozniak was signed to the New York Giants practice squad. He signed a reserve/future contract with the Giants on December 30, 2019. He was placed on the reserve/retired list by the team on July 30, 2020.
