= Jon Hilliman =

American football player (born 1995)

No. 31
- Position: Running back

Personal information
- Born: November 14, 1995 (age 30); Plainfield, New Jersey, U.S.
- Listed height: 5 ft 11 in (1.80 m)
- Listed weight: 216 lb (98 kg)

Career information
- High school: St. Peter's Preparatory School (Jersey City, New Jersey)
- College: Rutgers
- NFL draft: 2019: undrafted

Career history
- New York Giants (2019); San Antonio Brahmas (2023)

Career NFL statistics
- Rushing yards: 91
- Rushing average: 3
- Rushing touchdowns: 0
- Receptions: 3
- Receiving yards: 1
- Receiving touchdowns: 0
- Stats at Pro Football Reference

Jon Hilliman (born November 14, 1995) is an American former professional football player who was a running back in the National Football League (NFL). He played college football for the Rutgers Scarlet Knights, and was signed by the New York Giants as an undrafted free agent in 2019.

== Early life ==
Raised in Plainfield, New Jersey, Hilliman attended and played high school football at St. Peter's Preparatory School.

== College career ==
On December 27, 2014, in the Pinstripe Bowl, Hilliman had 25 carries for 148 yards and a touchdown in the 31–30 overtime loss to Penn State. After playing for Boston College from 2014–2017, Hilliman graduated and transferred to Rutgers as a graduate transfer. He led the team in rushing touchdowns as a redshirt senior at Rutgers.

=== Collegiate statistics ===
Jon Hilliman						Rushing				Receiving			
Year	School	Conf	Class	Pos	G	Att	Yds	Avg	TD	Rec	Yds	Avg	TD
2014	Boston College	ACC	FR	RB	13	210	860	4.1	13	1	5	5.0	0
2015	Boston College	ACC	SO	RB	4	51	198	3.9	2	3	33	11.0	0
2016	Boston College	ACC	SO	RB	12	184	542	2.9	6	1	2	2.0	0
2017	Boston College	ACC	JR	RB	13	167	638	3.8	5	24	155	6.5	2
2018	Rutgers	Big Ten	SR	RB	11	83	337	4.1	6	12	92	7.7	0
Career	Overall				53	695	2,575	3.7	32	41	287	7.0	2

== Professional career ==
=== New York Giants ===
After going undrafted in the 2019 NFL draft, Hilliman signed with the New York Giants. He was waived on August 31, 2019, and was signed to the practice squad the next day. He was promoted to the active roster on September 26, 2019. Hilliman made his first start with the Giants in Week 6 against the New England Patriots due to injuries suffered by starter Saquon Barkley and his backup Wayne Gallman. In the game, Hilliman rushed 11 times for 38 yards and lost a fumble when Jamie Collins stripped the ball out and Kyle Van Noy returned it for a touchdown in the 35–14 loss. Hilliman was waived by the Giants on October 11, 2019, in order for them to sign veteran running back Javorius Allen, and later re-signed to the practice squad. He signed a reserve/future contract with the Giants on December 30, 2019. He was waived on August 2, 2020.

=== San Antonio Brahmas ===
Hilliman was selected by the San Antonio Brahmas of the XFL on November 18, 2022. He was not part of the roster after the 2024 UFL dispersal draft on January 15, 2024.
