= Sam Beal =

American football player (born 1996)

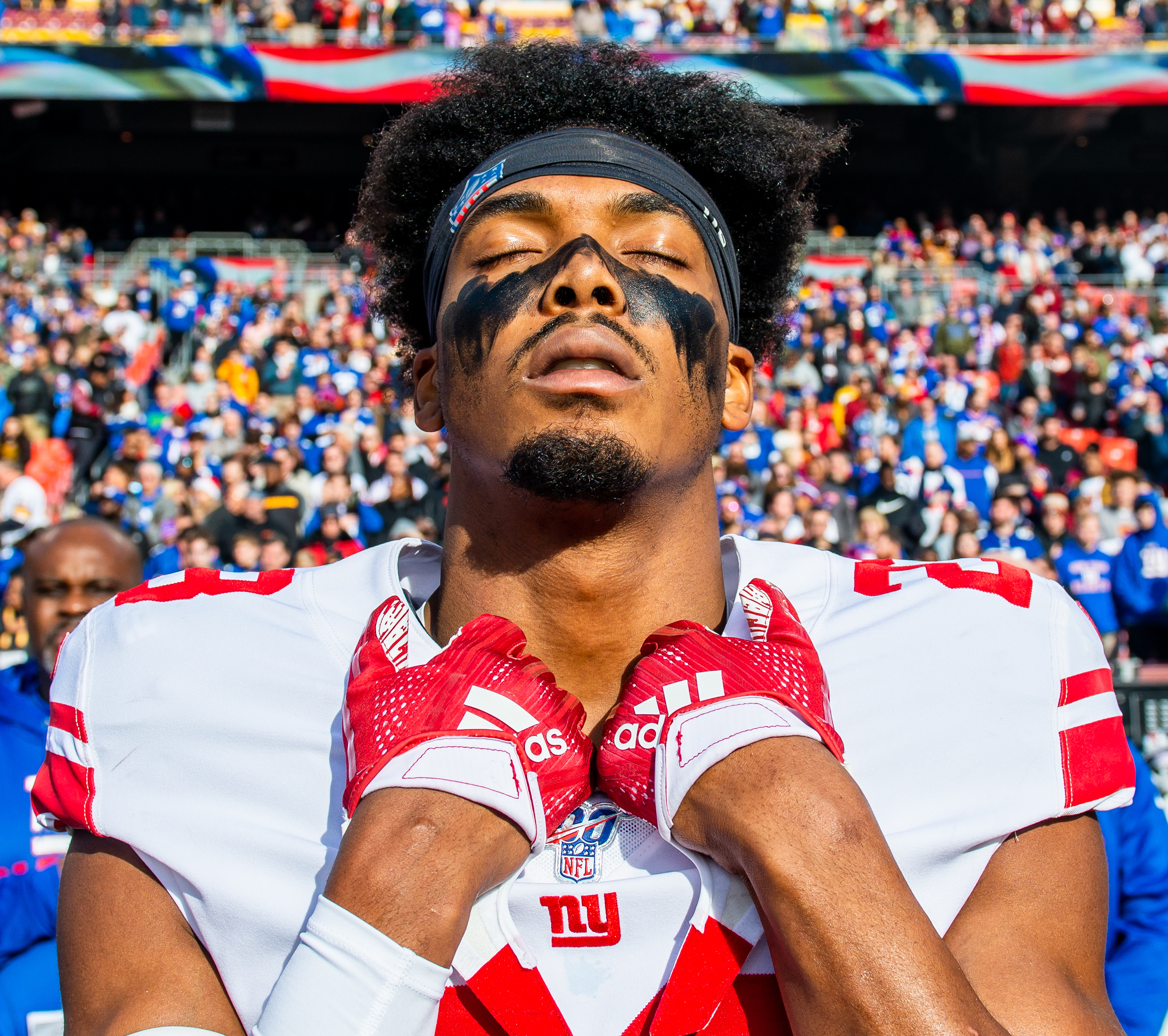
- Beal with the New York Giants in 2019

No. 23, 34
- Position: Cornerback

Personal information
- Born: August 30, 1996; Grand Rapids, Michigan, U.S.
- Listed height: 6 ft 1 in (1.85 m)
- Listed weight: 177 lb (80 kg)

Career information
- High school: Ottawa Hills (Grand Rapids)
- College: Western Michigan (2015–2017)
- Supplemental draft: 2018: 3rd round

Career history
- New York Giants (2018–2021)

Awards and highlights
- Second-team All-MAC (2017)

Career NFL statistics
- Total tackles: 27
- Pass deflections: 1
- Stats at Pro Football Reference

Other information
- Disappeared: July 12, 2025 (aged 28); Virginia Beach, Virginia, U.S.
- Status: Missing for 1 year, 3 months and 25 days

Samuel Beal (born August 30, 1996; disappeared July 12, 2025) is an American former professional football player who was a cornerback in the National Football League (NFL). He played college football for the Western Michigan Broncos.

== Early life ==
Playing at Ottawa Hills High School in Grand Rapids, Michigan, Beal started on its varsity football team for three years and played on both sides of the ball. Aside from football, Beal garnered All-American honors his senior year in track and field. He committed to Western Michigan in late July 2014, favoring the college because he lived in Kalamazoo before high school. Beal was a two-star prospect.

== College career ==
A nose for contact turned Beal to the defensive side of the ball in college. He played as a true freshman in twelve games and logged 55 tackles as a sophomore. A breakout game against USC, which included an interception of Sam Darnold, highlighted Beal's junior season, which was marred by an injury that occurred in regulation of a seven-overtime game against Buffalo and kept him out of the following week's game against Akron. Following the season, Beal was named Second Team All-Mid-American Conference (MAC).

Beal considered entering the 2018 NFL draft but decided to stay, citing a multitude of reasons. He was projected to go in the first round of the 2019 NFL draft. Beal was named a preseason First Team All-MAC selection for the upcoming 2018 season. In June before his senior season, Beal applied to enter the 2018 NFL Supplemental Draft.

== Professional career ==
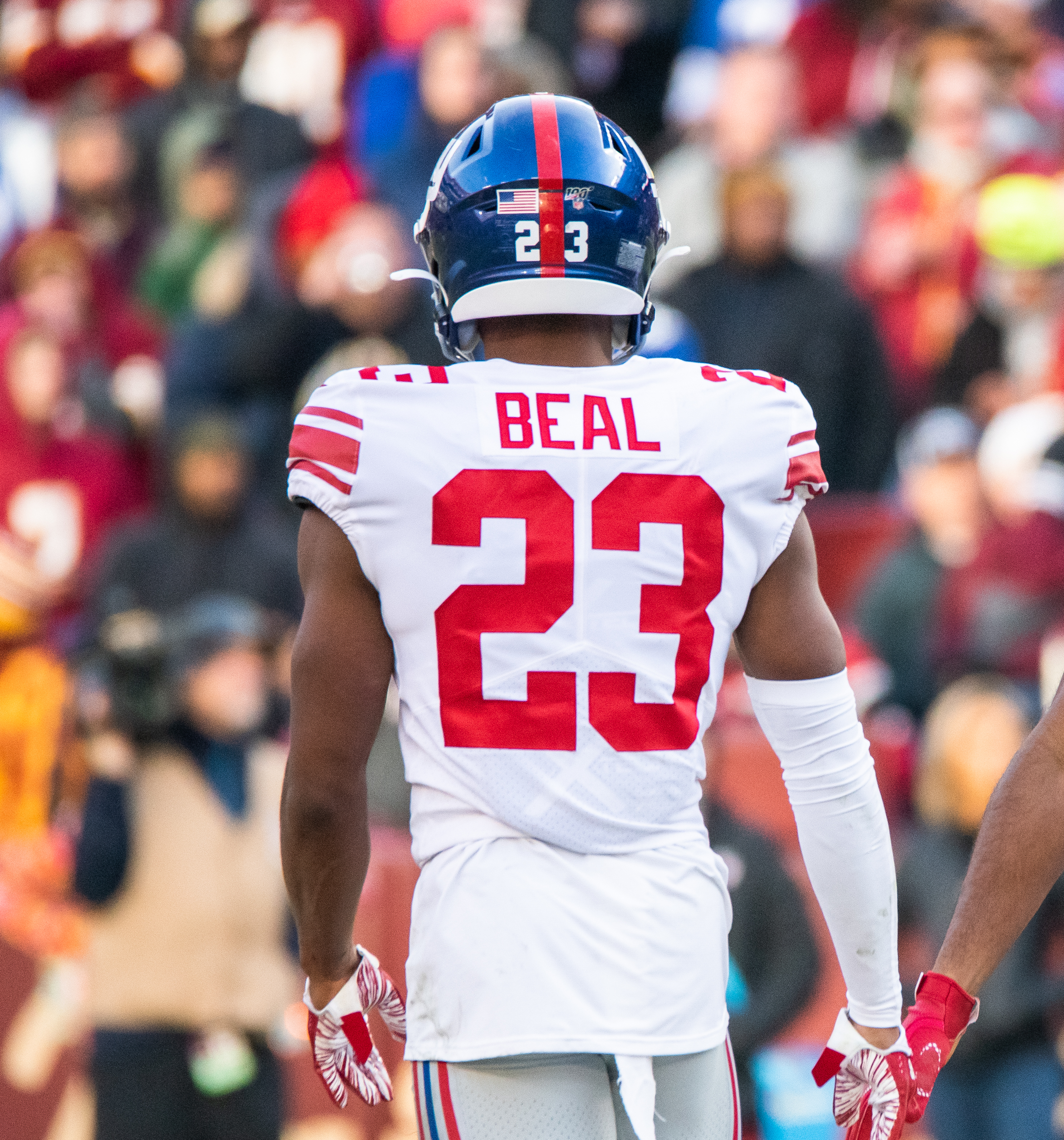
Beal in a game against the Washington Redskins

Beal was selected by the New York Giants in the third round of the 2018 Supplemental draft. On July 25, 2018, during training camp, Beal suffered a shoulder injury that would keep him out his entire rookie season. He was placed on injured reserve four days later.

On September 1, 2019, Beal was placed on injured reserve with a hamstring injury. He was designated for return from injured reserve and began practicing on October 16, 2019. He was activated on November 5.

On August 5, 2020, Beal announced he would opt out of the 2020 season due to the COVID-19 pandemic.

On November 9, 2021, Beal was waived from the active roster. On December 18, 2021, Beal was signed to the Giants practice squad. Beal was released on December 28, 2021.

== Legal issues ==
On June 11, 2021, Beal pleaded guilty to a pair of gun charges stemming from a June 2020 arrest in Ohio during which he was pulled over and a concealed weapon was discovered, and he was also cited for marijuana possession and a traffic violation. The plea put him on probation through June 2022.

== Disappearance ==
In July 2025, Beal was reported missing. He was last seen on July 12 after dropping off his girlfriend and borrowing her car to drive to a job he never arrived at, and he later told her by phone that he was returning home to Virginia Beach. The car was later recovered in Virginia Beach with Beal's shoes, socks, and sand inside. At the time of his disappearance, he had only the clothes he was wearing, a pair of slides, and his wallet containing his banking card and driver's license. As of November 2026, Beal has been missing for 16 months.
