= Evan Brown (American football) =

American football player (born 1996)

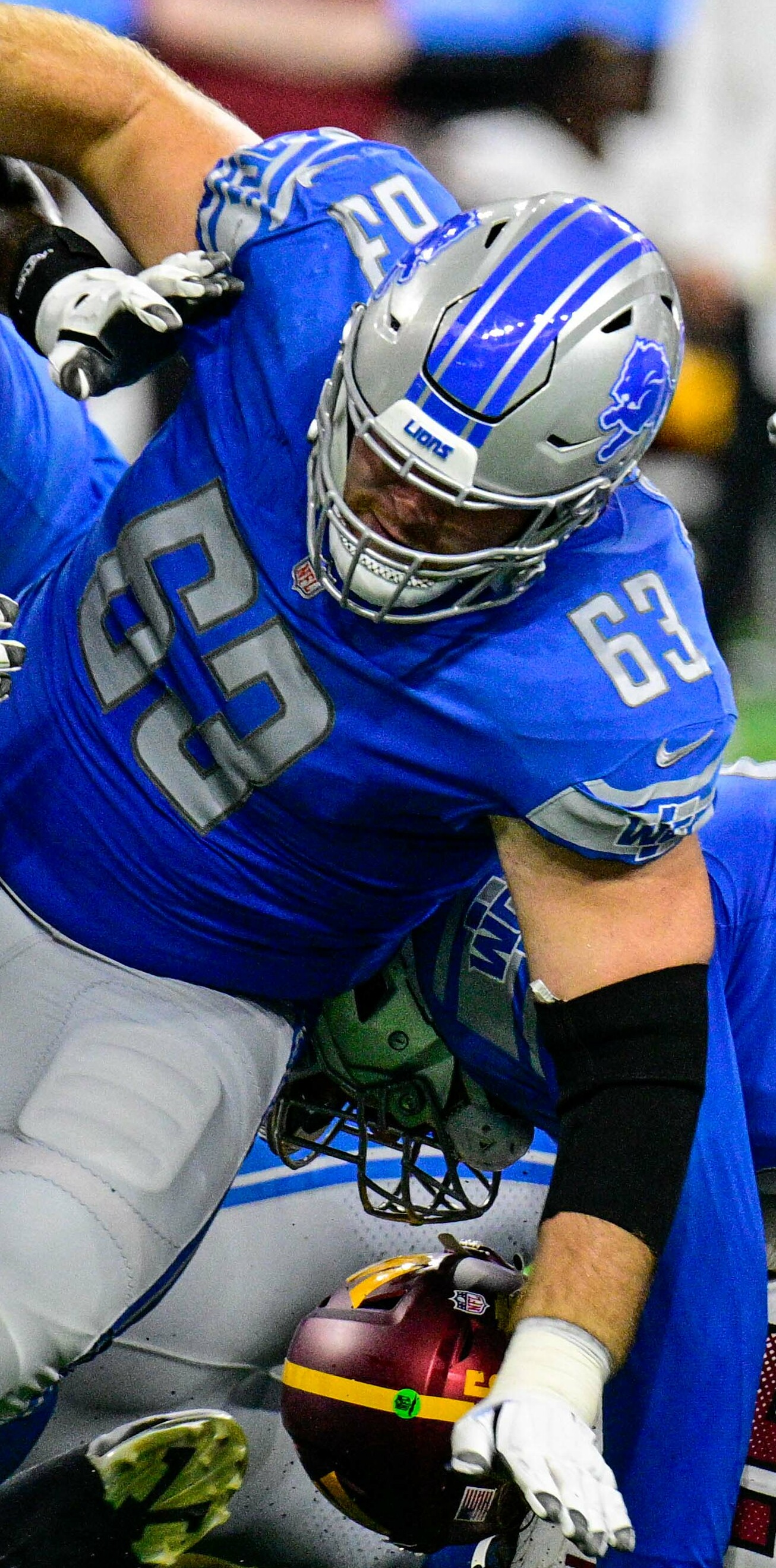
- Brown with the Detroit Lions in 2022

No. 63 – Houston Texans
- Position: Center
- Roster status: Active

Personal information
- Born: September 16, 1996 (age 30); Southlake, Texas, U.S.
- Listed height: 6 ft 3 in (1.91 m)
- Listed weight: 320 lb (145 kg)

Career information
- High school: Southlake Carroll (TX)
- College: SMU (2014–2017)
- NFL draft: 2018: undrafted

Career history
- New York Giants (2018–2019); Miami Dolphins (2019); Cleveland Browns (2020); Detroit Lions (2020–2022); Seattle Seahawks (2023); Arizona Cardinals (2024–2025); Houston Texans (2026–present)

Career NFL statistics as of Week 11, 2026
- Games played: 95
- Games started: 78
- Stats at Pro Football Reference

Evan Brown (born September 16, 1996) is an American professional center for the Houston Texans of the National Football League (NFL). He played college football for the SMU Mustangs. Brown has played both center and guard in his NFL career.

== Professional career ==
Pre-draft measurables
Height	Weight	Arm length	Hand span	Wingspan	40-yard dash	10-yard split	20-yard split	20-yard shuttle	Three-cone drill	Vertical jump	Broad jump	Bench press
6 ft 2 1/2 in (1.89 m)	302 lb (137 kg)	32 1/2 in (0.83 m)	10 in (0.25 m)	6 ft 7 1/8 in (2.01 m)	5.03 s	1.82 s	2.91 s	4.46 s	7.87 s	36.0 in (0.91 m)	9 ft 5 in (2.87 m)	36 reps
All values from Pro Day

=== New York Giants ===
Brown signed with the New York Giants as an undrafted free agent in 2018. Brown made the Giants' 53-man roster as a rookie and remained as an inactive reserve lineman for his rookie season.

On August 31, 2019, Brown was waived by the Giants and was signed to the practice squad the next day. He was promoted to the active roster on November 9, 2019, but was waived two days later, before being re-signed to the practice squad.

=== Miami Dolphins ===
On December 4, 2019, Brown was signed by the Miami Dolphins off the Giants practice squad. He was released on March 18, 2020.

=== Cleveland Browns ===
On March 26, 2020, Brown was signed by the Cleveland Browns. He played in a total of five games with 17 special teams snaps played. Brown was waived on November 5, 2020. He was re-signed to the Browns' practice squad on November 7, 2020, and subsequently released once more on November 10, 2020.

=== Detroit Lions ===
On December 4, 2020, Brown was signed to the Detroit Lions' practice squad. He was elevated to the active roster on December 25 and January 2, 2021, for the team's weeks 16 and 17 games against the Tampa Bay Buccaneers and Minnesota Vikings, and reverted to the practice squad after each game. He signed a reserve/future contract on January 5, 2021.

Brown was named the Lions backup center in 2021 to Frank Ragnow. He was named the starting center in Week 5 following a season-ending injury to Ragnow, and started 12 games.

On March 14, 2022, Brown re-signed with the Lions. He started 12 games in the 2022 season, largely at right guard due to injuries to Halapoulivaati Vaitai.

=== Seattle Seahawks ===
On April 3, 2023, Brown signed with the Seattle Seahawks. After training camp and preseason, Brown won the starting center job over fifth-round draft pick from Michigan Olusegun Oluwatimi.

=== Arizona Cardinals ===
On March 20, 2024, Brown signed with the Arizona Cardinals. He was named the Week 1 starting left guard, and started all 17 games. On March 10, 2025, Brown re-signed with the Cardinals on a two-year, $11.5 million contract. He started all 11 games he played in 2025, missing six games due to injury and personal reasons.

On March 12, 2026, Brown was released by Arizona, saving the Cardinals $4.91 million against the salary cap.

=== Houston Texans ===
On March 14, 2026, Brown signed with the Houston Texans on a one-year $3.5 million contract.
