= Chris Slayton =

American football player (born 1996)

Profile
- Position: Defensive end

Personal information
- Born: August 6, 1996 (age 30); Crete, Illinois, U.S.
- Listed height: 6 ft 4 in (1.93 m)
- Listed weight: 307 lb (139 kg)

Career information
- High school: Crete-Monee
- College: Syracuse (2014–2018)
- NFL draft: 2019: 7th round, 245th overall pick

Career history
- New York Giants (2019); Buffalo Bills (2020)*; Atlanta Falcons (2020–2021); Pittsburgh Steelers (2021)*; San Francisco 49ers (2021–2022)*; Green Bay Packers (2022–2023)*
- * Offseason or practice squad member only
- Stats at Pro Football Reference

Christopher Jon Slayton (born August 6, 1996) is an American professional football defensive end. He played college football at Syracuse.

== Professional career ==
=== New York Giants ===
Slayton was selected by the New York Giants in the seventh round, 245th overall, of the 2019 NFL draft. He was waived on August 31, 2019, and was signed to the practice squad the next day. He was promoted to the active roster on December 27, 2019.

On September 5, 2020, Slayton was waived from the Giants.

=== Buffalo Bills ===
On September 8, 2020, Slayton was signed to the Buffalo Bills practice squad. He was released on September 17.

=== Atlanta Falcons ===
On September 23, 2020, Slayton was signed to the Atlanta Falcons' practice squad. He was elevated to the active roster on October 17 for the team's week 6 game against the Minnesota Vikings, and reverted to the practice squad after the game. He signed a reserve/future contract on January 4, 2021.

On August 31, 2021, Slayton was waived by the Falcons and re-signed to the practice squad the next day. He was released on October 18.

=== Pittsburgh Steelers ===
On October 27, 2021, Slayton was signed to the Pittsburgh Steelers practice squad. However, he was released on November 2.

=== San Francisco 49ers ===
On November 18, 2021, Slayton was signed to the San Francisco 49ers practice squad. He signed a reserve/future contract with the 49ers on February 2, 2022. On May 23, 2022, he was released.

=== Green Bay Packers ===
On May 25, 2022, Slayton was claimed off waivers by the Green Bay Packers. He was waived on August 30, 2022, and signed to the practice squad the next day. He signed a reserve/future contract on January 10, 2023. He was released on August 29, 2023. A day later, he was signed to the Packers' practice squad. He was not signed to a reserve/future contract after the season and thus became a free agent when his practice squad contract expired.
