= Devante Downs =

American football player (born 1995)

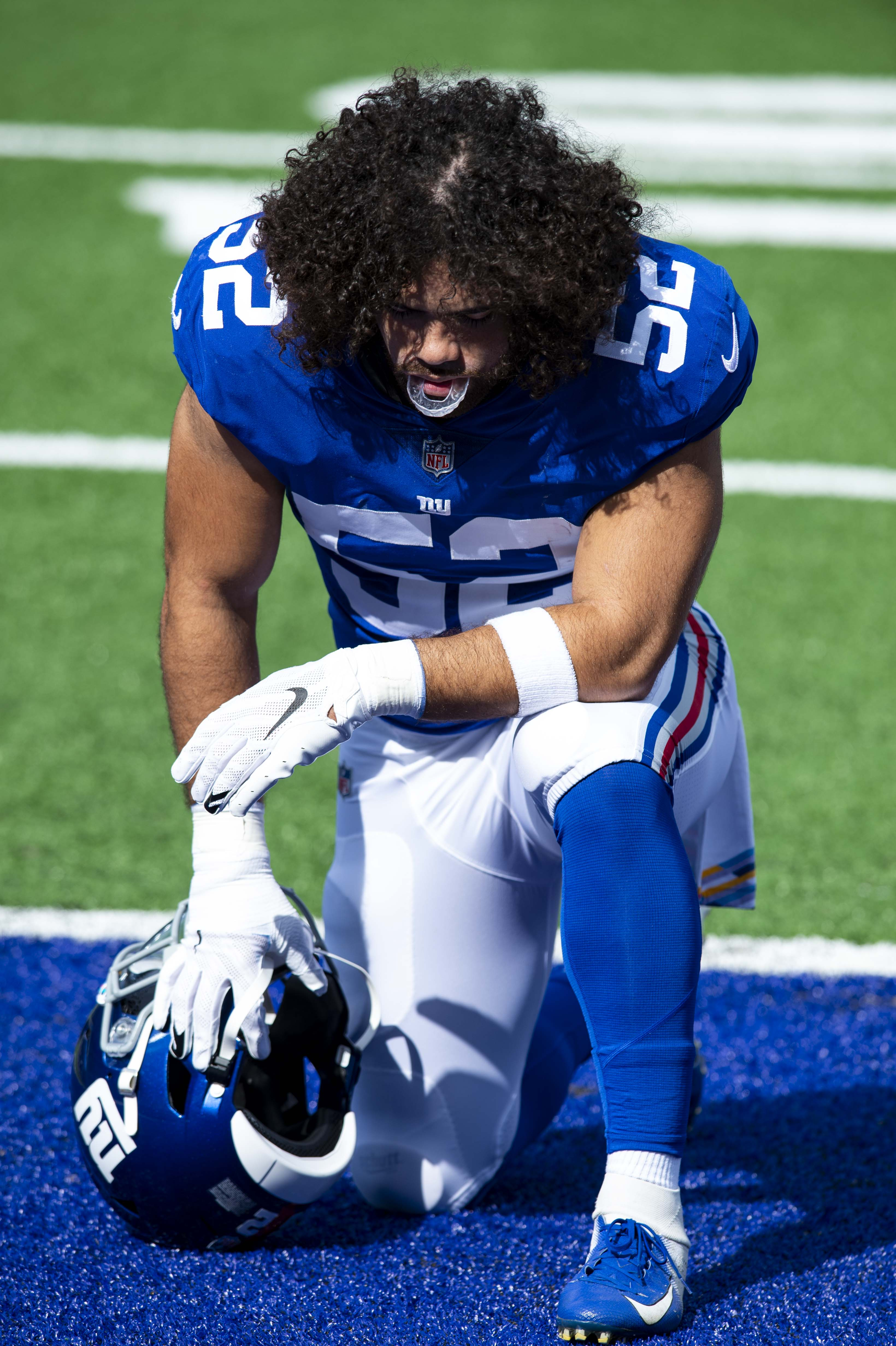
- Downs at MetLife Stadium in 2020

No. 57, 52
- Position: Linebacker

Personal information
- Born: October 18, 1995 (age 31); Mountlake Terrace, Washington, U.S.
- Listed height: 6 ft 2 in (1.88 m)
- Listed weight: 252 lb (114 kg)

Career information
- High school: Mountlake Terrace
- College: California
- NFL draft: 2018: 7th round, 225th overall pick

Career history
- Minnesota Vikings (2018–2019); New York Giants (2019–2020)

Career NFL statistics
- Total tackles: 37
- Fumble recoveries: 1
- Pass deflections: 1
- Stats at Pro Football Reference

Devante Downs (born October 18, 1995) is an American former professional football player who was a linebacker in the National Football League (NFL). He played college football for the California Golden Bears.

== Professional career ==
=== Minnesota Vikings ===
Downs was selected by the Minnesota Vikings in the seventh round (225th overall) of the 2018 NFL draft. He finished his rookie year with two tackles.

On August 31, 2019, Downs was waived by the Vikings and was signed to the practice squad the next day. He was promoted to the active roster on September 14, 2019. He was waived on September 24, 2019.

=== New York Giants ===
On October 1, 2019, Downs was signed to the New York Giants practice squad. He was promoted to the active roster on October 22, 2019.

In Week 1 of the 2020 season against the Pittsburgh Steelers on Monday Night Football, Downs recovered a muffed punt by Diontae Johnson during the 26–16 loss.

Downs re-signed with the Giants on March 24, 2021. He was waived on August 31, 2021.
