= Da'Mari Scott =

American football player (born 1995)

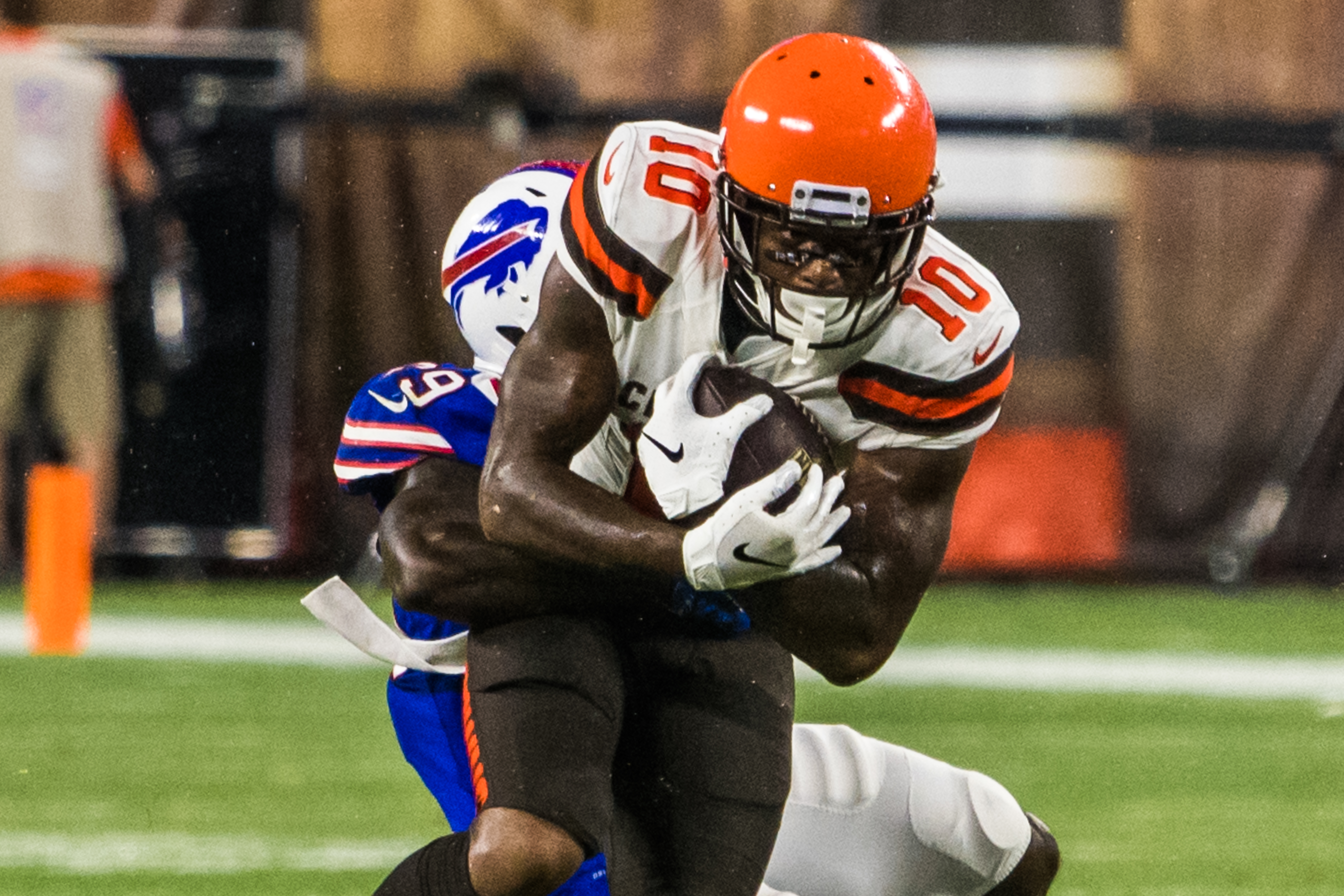
- Scott with the Cleveland Browns in 2018

No. 15, 18
- Position: Wide receiver

Personal information
- Born: August 8, 1995 (age 31); Muskegon Heights, Michigan, U.S.
- Listed height: 6 ft 0 in (1.83 m)
- Listed weight: 205 lb (93 kg)

Career information
- High school: Cathedral (Los Angeles, California)
- College: Fresno State
- NFL draft: 2018: undrafted

Career history
- Cleveland Browns (2018); Buffalo Bills (2018); New York Giants (2019–2020)

Career NFL statistics
- Receptions: 2
- Receiving yards: 22
- Stats at Pro Football Reference

Da'Mari Scott (born August 8, 1995) is an American former professional football player who was a wide receiver in the National Football League (NFL). He played college football for the Fresno State Bulldogs.

== Early life ==
Scott spent his early years in Muskegon, Michigan. As a teenager, he moved to Los Angeles, California, where he attended Cathedral High School. He made the move along with his sister, who was dating USC wide receiver Ronald Johnson, who is also from Muskegon.

== College career ==
Scott caught 91 passes for 1,163 yards and five touchdowns and returned 73 kicks for 1,560 yards during his college career at Fresno State.

== Professional career ==
=== Cleveland Browns ===
After going unselected in the 2018 NFL draft, Scott was signed as a free agent by the Cleveland Browns on May 4, 2018. He recorded eight catches during the 2018 preseason and was signed to the team's practice squad. He was promoted to the team's active roster on October 16, 2018. He was waived on December 1, 2018.

=== Buffalo Bills ===
On December 5, 2018, Scott was signed to the Buffalo Bills practice squad, and was promoted to the active roster three days later. He was waived on July 23, 2019.

=== New York Giants ===
On July 24, 2019, Scott was claimed off waivers by the New York Giants. He was waived on August 21, 2019. He was signed to the Giants practice squad on October 1, 2019. He was elevated to the active roster on November 27, 2019.

On August 2, 2020, Scott announced he would opt out of the 2020 season due to the COVID-19 pandemic. He was waived after the season on February 12, 2021.
