= Tuzar Skipper =

American football player (born 1995)

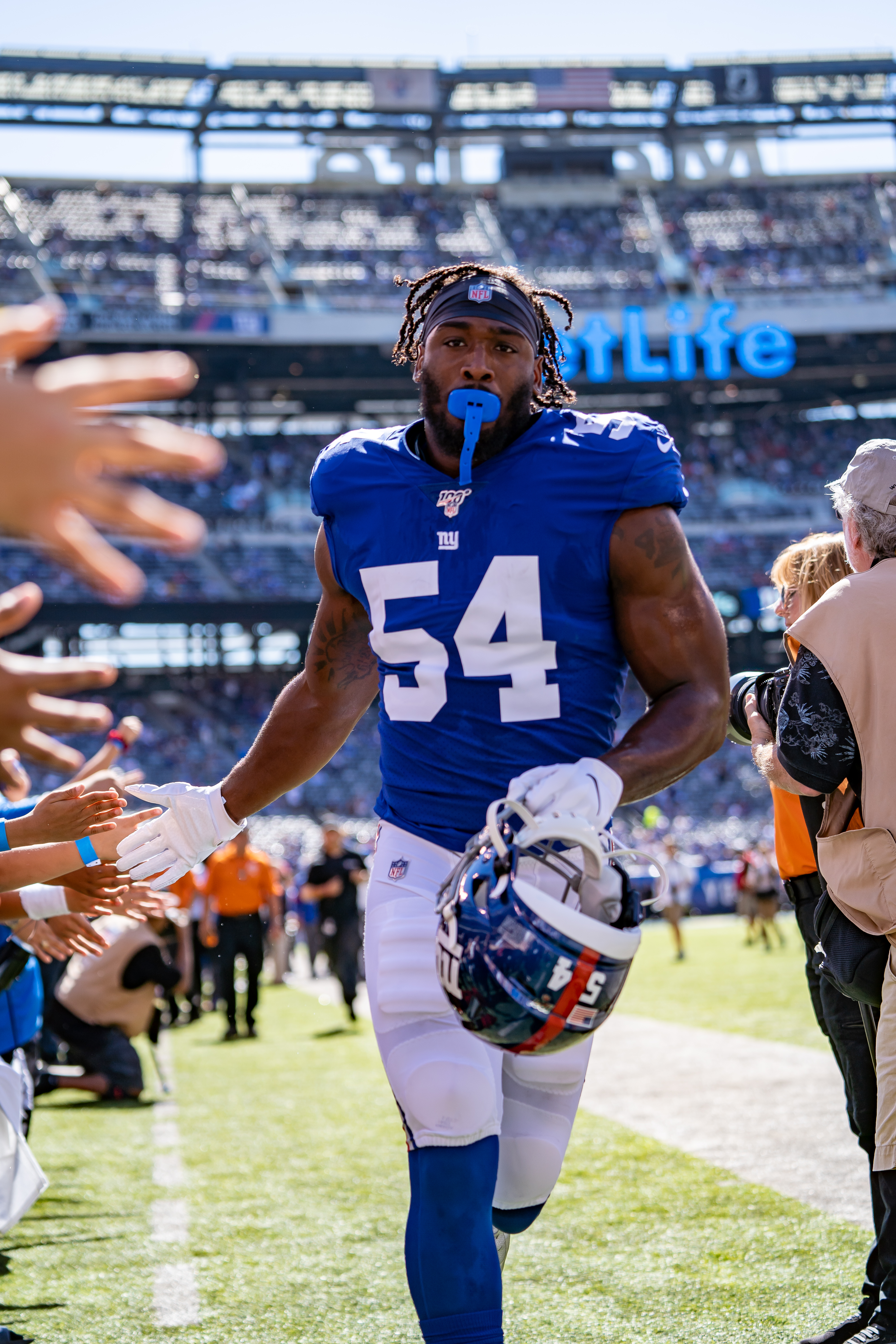
- Skipper with the New York Giants in 2019

Profile
- Position: Outside linebacker

Personal information
- Born: June 5, 1995 (age 31); The Bronx, New York, U.S.
- Listed height: 6 ft 2 in (1.88 m)
- Listed weight: 248 lb (112 kg)

Career information
- High school: Norwich Free Academy
- College: Monroe (2014–2015); Toledo (2016–2018)
- NFL draft: 2019: undrafted

Career history
- Pittsburgh Steelers (2019)*; New York Giants (2019); Pittsburgh Steelers (2019); Tennessee Titans (2020); Atlanta Falcons (2021)*; Tennessee Titans (2021–2022)*; Pittsburgh Steelers (2022)*; Seattle Sea Dragons (2023); Arlington Renegades (2024–2025)
- * Offseason or practice squad member only

Career NFL statistics
- Total tackles: 8
- Sacks: 0.5
- Fumble recoveries: 1
- Stats at Pro Football Reference

Tuzar Skipper (born June 5, 1995) is an American professional football outside linebacker. He played college football at the University of Toledo.

== College career ==
Skipper played college football for Monroe College from 2014 to 2015 and for Toledo from 2016 to 2018. In 2014 and 2015, he was named to the All-NFC second-team. In 2018, he was named to the All-MAC third-team.

== Professional career ==
Pre-draft measurables
| Height | Weight | Arm length | Hand span | 40-yard dash | 10-yard split | 20-yard split | 20-yard shuttle | Three-cone drill | Vertical jump | Broad jump | Bench press |
|---|---|---|---|---|---|---|---|---|---|---|---|
| 6 ft 2 3/8 in (1.89 m) | 248 lb (112 kg) | 33 in (0.84 m) | 9 1/2 in (0.24 m) | 4.89 s | 1.70 s | 2.83 s | 4.42 s | 7.14 s | 33.0 in (0.84 m) | 10 ft 7 in (3.23 m) | 30 reps |
All values from Pro Day

=== Pittsburgh Steelers ===
Skipper was signed by the Pittsburgh Steelers as an undrafted free agent in 2019. After making the Steelers initial 53-man roster, Skipper was waived prior to Week 1 on September 7, 2019.

=== New York Giants ===
On September 9, 2019, Skipper was claimed off waivers by the New York Giants. He was waived on October 22, 2019, and re-signed to the practice squad.

=== Pittsburgh Steelers (second stint) ===
On November 19, 2019, Skipper was re-signed by the Steelers off the Giants practice squad. On December 30, Skipper was re-signed by the Steelers to a two-year contract. He was waived on September 5, 2020.

=== Tennessee Titans ===
Skipper was signed to the Tennessee Titans' practice squad on September 15, 2020. He was elevated to the active roster on November 21, November 28, December 5, and December 12 for the team's weeks 11, 12, 13, and 14 games against the Baltimore Ravens, Indianapolis Colts, Cleveland Browns, and Jacksonville Jaguars, and reverted to the practice squad after each game. He was placed on the practice squad/injured list on December 15, 2020, and restored to the practice squad on January 6, 2021.

He was signed to a futures contract by the Titans on January 11, 2021. Skipper was waived by Tennessee on July 25, 2021.

=== Atlanta Falcons ===
On July 31, 2021, Skipper signed with the Atlanta Falcons. He was waived on August 31, 2021.

=== Tennessee Titans ===
On December 6, 2021, Skipper was signed to the Tennessee Titans practice squad. After the Titans were eliminated in the Divisional Round of the 2021 playoffs, he signed a reserve/future contract on January 24, 2022. He was waived on May 2, 2022.

=== Pittsburgh Steelers (third stint) ===
On June 1, 2022, Skipper signed with the Pittsburgh Steelers. He was waived/injured on August 15, 2022. He reverted to injured reserve the following day. He was released on August 24, 2022.

=== Seattle Sea Dragons ===
On November 17, 2022, Skipper was drafted by the Seattle Sea Dragons of the XFL.

=== Arlington Renegades ===
On June 16, 2023, Skipper was traded, along with the 40th pick in the XFL Rookie Draft, to the Arlington Renegades in exchange for George Moore and the 46th pick. Skipper re-signed with the Renegades on February 2, 2024. He was placed on injured reserve on April 10, 2024. He re-signed with the team again on September 30, 2024. He was released on April 16, 2025.
