= Scott Simonson =

American football player (born 1992)

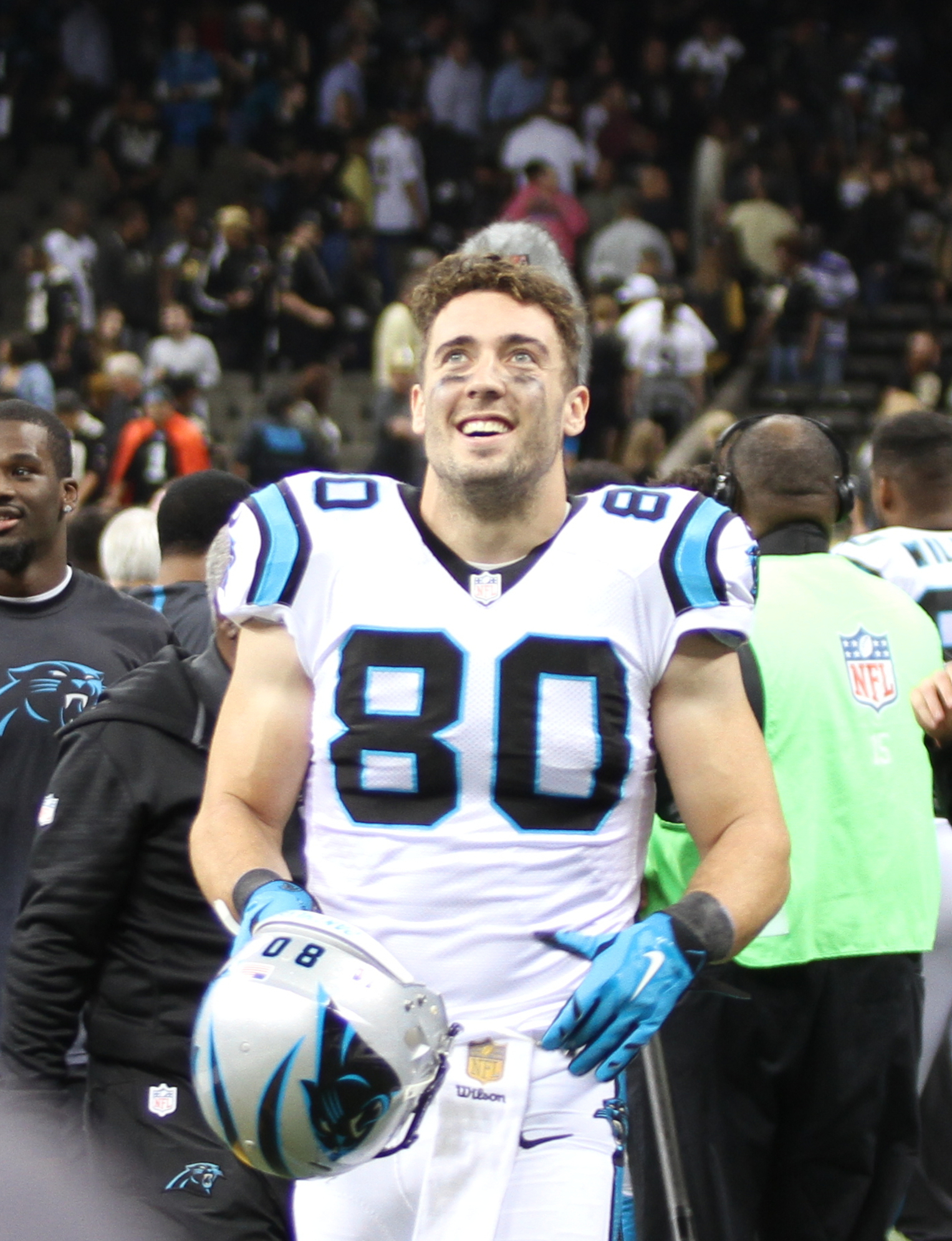
- Simonson with the Carolina Panthers in 2015

No. 80, 82, 83
- Position: Tight end

Personal information
- Born: April 13, 1992 (age 34); Staten Island, New York, U.S.
- Listed height: 6 ft 5 in (1.96 m)
- Listed weight: 255 lb (116 kg)

Career information
- High school: Middletown South (Middletown, New Jersey)
- College: Assumption
- NFL draft: 2014: undrafted

Career history
- Oakland Raiders (2014); Carolina Panthers (2015–2017); New York Giants (2018–2019)

Career NFL statistics
- Receptions: 12
- Receiving yards: 107
- Receiving touchdowns: 1
- Stats at Pro Football Reference

Scott Simonson (born April 13, 1992) is an American former professional football player who was a tight end in the National Football League (NFL). He was signed by the Oakland Raiders as an undrafted free agent in 2014. He played college football for the Assumption Greyhounds.

Born in Staten Island, New York, and raised in Red Bank, New Jersey, Simonson played prep football at Middletown High School South. As a fourth-grader, Simonson made a blood marrow donation to help save the life of his then three-year-old sister, who had been diagnosed with Fanconi anemia.

== College career ==
In his collegiate career, Simonson played in 36 games with 31 starts at Assumption University. He totaled 104 receptions for 1,537 yards and 15 touchdowns. As a senior in 2013, he was named as a First-team All-Northeast-10 Conference selection. He started 11 games and led the team with 39 catches for 604 yards and five touchdowns. As a junior in 2012, he was a second-team All-Northeast Conference choice. He started 10 games and finished second on the team with 36 receptions for 558 yards and six touchdowns. As a sophomore in 2011, he started 10 games and caught 29 passes for 375 yards and four touchdowns. As a freshman in 2010, he played in five games.

== Professional career ==
=== Oakland Raiders ===
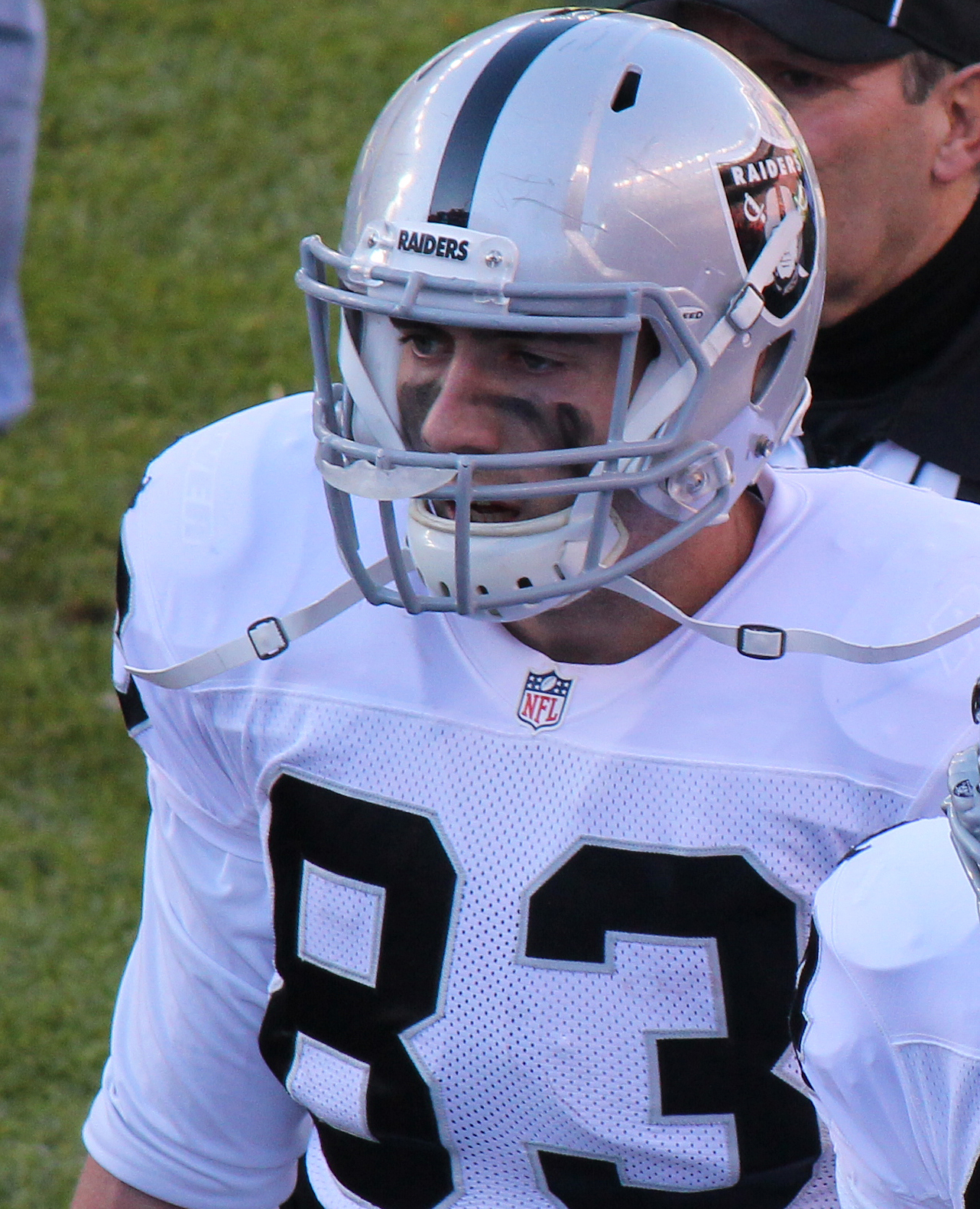
Simonson playing for the Oakland Raiders in 2014

On May 16, 2014, Simonson was signed as an undrafted free agent by the Oakland Raiders. On September 1, he was re-signed to the Raiders' practice squad. On December 6, Simonson was promoted to the Raiders' active roster. On June 4, 2015, he was waived by the Raiders.

=== Carolina Panthers ===
On June 10, 2015, Simonson was signed by the Carolina Panthers. On September 5, he was released by the Panthers. On September 7, Simonson was re-signed to the Panthers' practice squad. On February 7, 2016, Simonson's Panthers played in Super Bowl 50. In the game, the Panthers fell to the Denver Broncos by a score of 24–10.

Simonson was released by Carolina on October 15, 2016. He was re-signed by the team three days later. Simonson was released by the Panthers on November 4, and was re-signed to the practice squad on November 9.

Simonson signed a reserve/future contract with the Panthers on January 2, 2017. On September 1, Simonson was placed on injured reserve.

=== New York Giants ===
On June 12, 2018, Simonson signed with the New York Giants. On December 23, Simonson scored his first career NFL touchdown against the Indianapolis Colts in a Week 16 matchup, on a three-yard reception from quarterback Eli Manning.

On February 19, 2019, Simonson signed a one-year contract extension with the Giants. He was placed on injured reserve on August 31, with an ankle injury. Simonson was released from injured reserve with an injury settlement on September 10. On November 12, Simonson was re-signed by the Giants. He was placed on injured reserve on December 28, with a concussion. On February 24, 2020, Simonson was released by the New York Giants.
