= Jon Halapio =

American football player (born 1991)

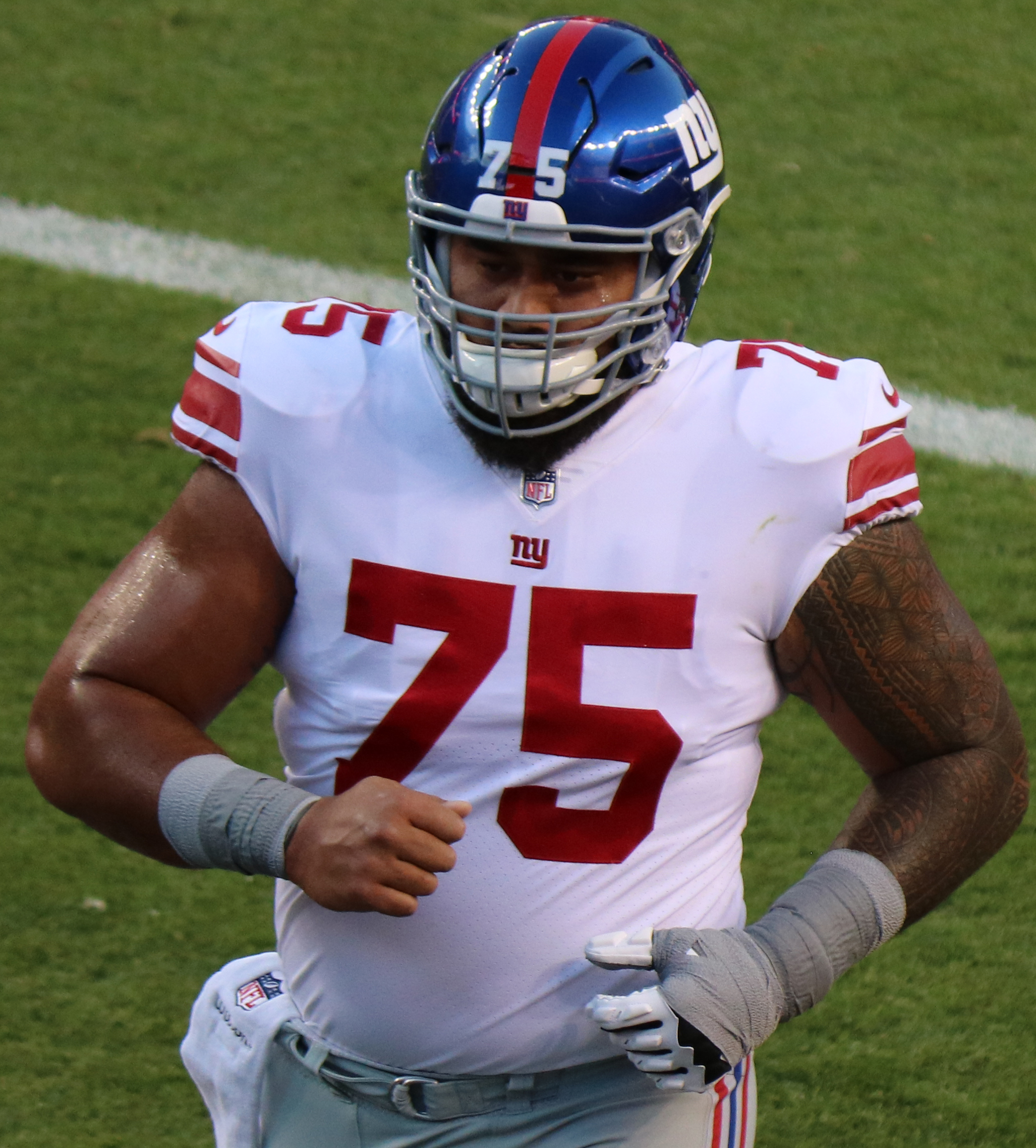
- Halapio with the New York Giants in 2017

No. 75
- Position: Center

Personal information
- Born: June 23, 1991 (age 35); St. Petersburg, Florida, U.S.
- Listed height: 6 ft 4 in (1.93 m)
- Listed weight: 315 lb (143 kg)

Career information
- High school: St. Petersburg Catholic
- College: Florida (2009–2013)
- NFL draft: 2014: 6th round, 179th overall pick

Career history
- New England Patriots (2014)*; Boston Brawlers (2014); Denver Broncos (2014–2015)*; Arizona Cardinals (2015)*; Brooklyn Bolts (2015); New England Patriots (2016)*; New York Giants (2016–2019); Denver Broncos (2020)*; San Francisco 49ers (2021)*
- * Offseason or practice squad member only

Career NFL statistics
- Games played: 27
- Games started: 23
- Stats at Pro Football Reference

Jonathan Halapio (born June 23, 1991) is an American former professional football player who was a center in the National Football League (NFL). He was selected by the New England Patriots in the sixth round of the 2014 NFL draft. He played college football for the Florida Gators.

== College career ==
Halapio attended the University of Florida from 2009 to 2013. During his career, he started 43 of 51 games at guard and was a team captain his junior and senior seasons.

== Professional career ==
Pre-draft measurables
Height	Weight	Arm length	Hand span	40-yard dash	20-yard shuttle	Three-cone drill	Vertical jump	Broad jump
6 ft 3 1/2 in (1.92 m)	323 lb (147 kg)	33 5/8 in (0.85 m)	10 1/4 in (0.26 m)	5.34 s	4.83 s	8.26 s	21.5 in (0.55 m)	8 ft 4 in (2.54 m)
All values from NFL Combine

=== New England Patriots (first stint) ===
Halapio was selected by the New England Patriots in the sixth round of the 2014 NFL draft. He was released on August 30, 2014, as part of final roster cuts.

=== Boston Brawlers ===
Halapio played for the Boston Brawlers of the Fall Experimental Football League (FXFL) in 2014.

=== Denver Broncos (first stint) ===
On December 17, 2014, Halapio was signed to the Denver Broncos practice squad. On May 11, 2015, Halapio was waived.

=== Arizona Cardinals ===
On June 5, 2015, Halapio signed with the Arizona Cardinals. On September 5, 2015, he was released by the team.

=== Brooklyn Bolts ===
Halapio played for the Brooklyn Bolts of the FXFL in 2015.

=== New England Patriots (second stint) ===
On July 27, 2016, Halapio was signed by the Patriots. On September 3, 2016, he was released by the Patriots as part of final roster cuts.

=== New York Giants ===
On September 29, 2016, Halapio was signed to the Giants' practice squad. He signed a reserve/future contract with the Giants on January 9, 2017. He was waived on September 2, 2017, and was signed to the Giants' practice squad the next day. He was promoted to the active roster on October 4, 2017. He made his first career start in Week 12 at right guard in place of the injured D. J. Fluker.

On March 12, 2018, Halapio re-signed with the Giants. He was named the Giants starting center to start the season, beating out Brett Jones. On September 16, 2018, he suffered a broken right ankle and lower leg in a Week 2 game against the Dallas Cowboys and was ruled out for the rest of the season. He was placed on injured reserve on September 19, 2018.

On March 8, 2019, Halapio re-signed with the Giants. He started 15 games for the Giants in 2019, missing one due to a hamstring injury. Following Week 17, Halapio underwent surgery to repair a torn Achilles.

On September 2, 2020, Halapio re-signed with the Giants, but was released three days later.

=== Denver Broncos (second stint) ===
On November 9, 2020, the Broncos signed Halapio to their practice squad. He was released after the regular season on January 7, 2021.

=== San Francisco 49ers ===
On October 18, 2021, Halapio was signed to the San Francisco 49ers practice squad.
