= NFL Rookie of the Week =

Weekly NFL award

Pepsi Zero Sugar Rookie of the Week
- Awarded for: Top performances for rookie players in the NFL
- Presented by: PepsiCo

History
- First award: 2002
- Website: Official website

Pepsi NFL Rookie of the Week, sponsored by Pepsi, is an award presented to the top performing rookie players in the National Football League. Each week, a list of nominees is developed, based on exemplary individual statistical performances from that week's games (Thursday (Note: In some seasons, including twice in 2026, the first game of the weekend was scheduled and held on Wednesday night.) through Monday night). The weekly winners are then voted on by fans via an online poll at NFL.com and the winners are typically announced on Wednesday or Thursday. At the conclusion of the season five finalists are tallied for the Pepsi NFL Rookie of the Year award.

As of 2026, Jayden Daniels holds the record for most awards, earning the award 11 times during his rookie season, passing Ben Roethlisberger.

First presented in 2002, the award has sometimes been named after other varieties of Pepsi, such as Diet Pepsi and Pepsi Zero Sugar. It is separate from the NFL Rookie of the Month Award, which is selected by an expert panel rather than a fan vote.

== Winners ==
=== 2002 ===
Week	Player	Team	Position	Key statistics and notes
1	Randy McMichael	Miami	TE	4 receptions, 73 yards, 1 TD
2	Josh Reed	Buffalo	WR	8 receptions, 110 yards, 1 TD
3	Randy McMichael (2)	Miami	TE	5 receptions, 79 yards, 1 TD
4	Phillip Buchanon	Oakland	CB	1 INT; 2 punt returns for 78 yards, 1 TD
5	Phillip Buchanon (2)	Oakland	CB	1 INT for 81 yards and 1 TD
6	Marques Anderson	Green Bay	S	1 INT for 22 yards, 11 tackles
7	Marques Anderson (2)	Green Bay	S	4 tackles, 5 assists
8	André Davis	Cleveland	WR	3 receptions, 29 yards, 1 TD
9	Daniel Graham	New England	TE	3 receptions, 68 yards
10	Marques Anderson (3)	Green Bay	S	1 INT for 14 yards, 1 TD
11	Jeremy Shockey	NY Giants	TE	11 receptions, 111 yards
12	William Green	Cleveland	RB	28 carries, 114 yards, 1 TD
13	Tony Fisher	Green Bay	RB	17 carries, 91 yards, 1 TD; 2 receptions, 15 yards
14	William Green (2)	Cleveland	RB	26 carries, 119 yards, 1 TD; 3 receptions, 25 yards
15	Clinton Portis	Denver	RB	21 carries, 130 yards, 3 TD; 3 receptions, 75 yards, 1 TD
16	Jeremy Shockey (2)	NY Giants	TE	7 receptions, 116 yards
17	William Green (3)	Cleveland	RB	27 carries, 178 yards, 2 TD; 2 receptions, 9 yards
ROY	Jeremy Shockey	NY Giants	TE	894 yards, 2 TD

=== 2003 ===
Week	Player	Team	Position	Key statistics and notes
1	Anquan Boldin	Arizona	WR	10 receptions, 217 yards, 2 TD
2	Nick Barnett	Green Bay	LB	1 INT for 14 yards
3	Asante Samuel	New England	CB	1 INT for 55 yards, 1 TD
4	Andre Johnson	Houston	WR	8 receptions, 97 yards
5	Nick Barnett (2)	Green Bay	LB	12 combined tackles (2 TFL), 1 sack
6	Nick Barnett (3)	Green Bay	LB	11 combined tackles
7	Domanick Davis	Houston	RB	27 carries, 129 yards; 9 receptions, 70 yards
8	Domanick Davis (2)	Houston	RB	25 carries, 109 yards, 2 TD; 7 receptions, 27 yards
9	Domanick Davis (3)	Houston	RB	12 carries, 74 yards; 1 reception, -3 yards
10	Domanick Davis (4)	Houston	RB	15 carries, 104 yards, 1 TD; 1 reception, 11 yards
11	Andre Johnson (2)	Houston	WR	4 receptions, 122 yards, 1 TD
12	Charles Tillman	Chicago	CB	6 solo tackles, 1 sack
13	Domanick Davis (5)	Houston	RB	24 carries, 101 yards, 2 TD; 2 receptions, 27 yards
14	Lance Briggs	Chicago	LB	1 INT for 45 yards, TD
15	Terence Newman	Dallas	CB	3 INT for 23 yards
16	Boss Bailey	Detroit	LB	12 combined tackles (1 TFL); 62-yard fumble recovery TD
17	Victor Hobson	NY Jets	LB	1 INT for 26 yards
ROY	Domanick Davis	Houston	RB	1,031 yards, 8 TD; 351 receiving yards

=== 2004 ===
Week	Player	Team	Position	Key statistics and notes
1	Erik Coleman	NY Jets	S	1 INT for 4 yards
2	Roy Williams	Detroit	WR	4 receptions, 73 yards and 2 TD
3	Ben Roethlisberger	Pittsburgh	QB	12/22, 163 yards, 1 TD, 1 INT; 1 carry, 2 yards
4	Ben Roethlisberger (2)	Pittsburgh	QB	17/25, 174 yards, 1 TD; 4 carries, 2 yards
5	Ben Roethlisberger (3)	Pittsburgh	QB	16/21, 231 yards, 1 TD, 1 INT; 6 carries, 13 yards, 1 TD
6	Ben Roethlisberger (4)	Pittsburgh	QB	21/25, 193 yards, 2 TD; 2 carries, 8 yards
7	Mewelde Moore	Minnesota	RB	20 carries, 138 yards; 5 receptions, 30 yards; 1 kickoff return for 19 yards
8	Ben Roethlisberger (5)	Pittsburgh	QB	18/24, 196 yards, 2 TD; 5 carries, 3 yards
9	Ben Roethlisberger (6)	Pittsburgh	QB	11/18, 183 yards, 2 TD, 1 INT; 6 carries, 10 yards
10	Bob Sanders	Indianapolis	S	11 combined tackles; 37-yard fumble recovery TD
11	Ben Roethlisberger (7)	Pittsburgh	QB	15/21, 138 yards, 1 TD; 9 carries, 16 yards
12	Ahmad Carroll	Green Bay	CB	3 tackles; 1 INT; 40-yard fumble recovery TD
13	Ben Roethlisberger (8)	Pittsburgh	QB	14/17, 221 yards, 2 TD; 3 carries, 40 yards
14	Michael Clayton	Tampa Bay	WR	9 receptions, 145 yards, 1 TD
15	Eli Manning	NY Giants	QB	16/23, 182 yards, 2 TD, 1 INT; 2 carries, 18 yards
16	Ben Roethlisberger (9)	Pittsburgh	QB	14/19, 221 yards, 2 TD, 1 INT; 2 carries, 11 yards
17	Eli Manning (2)	NY Giants	QB	18/27, 144 yards, 3 TD, 1 INT
ROY	Ben Roethlisberger	Pittsburgh	QB	2,621 yards, 17 TD, 11 INT; 144 rushing yards, 1 TD

=== 2005 ===
Week	Player	Team	Position	Key statistics and notes
1	Carnell Williams	Tampa Bay	RB	27 carries, 148 yards; 71-yard game-clinching TD run
2	Carnell Williams (2)	Tampa Bay	RB	24 carries, 128 yards, 1 TD
3	Carnell Williams (3)	Tampa Bay	RB	37 carries, 158 yards; NFL record 434 rushing yards in first three games
4	Dominique Foxworth	Denver	CB	6 tackles; 1 INT (23-yard return); 1 fumble recovery (9-yard return)
5	Tyson Thompson	Dallas	RB	20 carries, 75 yards
6	Odell Thurman	Cincinnati	LB	6 tackles, (1 TFL); 30-yard INT return TD
7	Kyle Orton	Chicago	QB	15/29, 145 yards, 1 TD
8	Heath Miller	Pittsburgh	TE	3 receptions, 18 yards, 2 TD
9	Reggie Brown	Philadelphia	WR	5 receptions, 94 yards, 1 TD
10	Samkon Gado	Green Bay	RB	25 carries, 103 yards and 2 TD; 4 receptions, 5 yards, 1 TD
11	Shawne Merriman	San Diego	LB	2 sacks
12	Ryan Fitzpatrick	St. Louis	QB	19/30, 310 yards, 3 TD; 3 carries, 12 yards
13	Charlie Frye	Cleveland	QB	13/20, 226 yards, 2 TD; 2 carries, 10 yards
14	Samkon Gado (2)	Green Bay	RB	29 carries, 171 yards, 1 TD; 1 reception, 9 yards; 1 pass attempt
15	Charlie Frye (2)	Cleveland	QB	21/32, 198 yards, 1 INT; 7 carries, 11 yards
16	DeMarcus Ware	Dallas	LB	3 sacks
17	Charlie Frye (3)	Cleveland	QB	22/37, 199 yards, 1 TD, 1 INT; 2 carries 8 yards
ROY	Carnell Williams	Tampa Bay	RB	1,178 yards, 6 TD; 81 receiving yards

=== 2006 ===
Week	Player	Team	Position	Key statistics and notes
1	Reggie Bush	New Orleans	RB	15 carries, 67 yards; 7 receptions, 52 yards; 3 punt returns, 21 yards
2	Manny Lawson	San Francisco	LB	3 tackles, 2 sacks
3	Greg Jennings	Green Bay	WR	3 receptions, 101 yards, 1 TD
4	Laurence Maroney	New England	RB	15 carries, 125 yards, 1 TD
5	Hank Baskett	Philadelphia	WR	3 receptions, 112 yards, 1 TD
6	Santonio Holmes	Pittsburgh	WR	2 receptions, 58 yards; 99 total return yards
7	A. J. Hawk	Green Bay	LB	12 tackles (9 solo), 1 sack
8	Marques Colston	New Orleans	WR	6 receptions, 163 yards, 2 TD
9	Marques Colston (2)	New Orleans	WR	11 receptions, 123 yards, 1 TD
10	A. J. Hawk (2)	Green Bay	LB	12 tackles (five solo), sack, forced fumble
11	Santonio Holmes (2)	Pittsburgh	WR	5 receptions, 71 yards, 1 TD
12	Vince Young	Tennessee	QB	24/35, 249 yards, 2 TD; 10 carries, 69 yards, 1 TD
13	Vince Young (2)	Tennessee	QB	15/25, 163 yards, 2 TD, 2 INT; 9 carries, 78 yards
14	Vince Young (3)	Tennessee	QB	19/29 attempts, 218 yards, 1 INT; 7 carries, 86 yards, 1 TD
15	Jay Cutler	Denver	QB	21/31, 261 yards, 2 TD, 1 INT
16	Vince Young (4)	Tennessee	QB	13/20, 183 yards, 2 TD; 8 carries, 61 yards, 1 TD
17	Hank Baskett (2)	Philadelphia	WR	7 receptions, 177 yards, 1 TD
ROY	Vince Young	Tennessee	QB	2,199 yards, 12 TD, 13 INT; 552 rushing yards, 7 TD

=== 2007 ===
Week	Player	Team	Position	Key statistics and notes
1	Patrick Willis	San Francisco	LB	11 tackles (9 solo), forced fumble
2	Patrick Willis (2)	San Francisco	LB	8 tackles (5 solo)
3	Dwayne Bowe	Kansas City	WR	5 receptions, 71 yards, 1 TD
4	Dwayne Bowe (2)	Kansas City	WR	8 receptions, 164 yards, 1 TD
5	Nick Folk	Dallas	PK	4-for-4 FG, 1 PAT, onside kick, game-winning 53-yard FG as time expired
6	Adrian Peterson	Minnesota	RB	20 carries, 224 yards, 3 TD (67, 73, 35 yards); 128 kickoff return yards
7	Marshawn Lynch	Buffalo	RB	27 carries, 84 yards, 1 TD; 3 receptions, 14 yards
8	James Jones	Green Bay	WR	3 receptions, 107 yards, 1 TD
9	Adrian Peterson (2)	Minnesota	RB	30 carries, 296 yards (single-game NFL record), 3 TD
10	Marshawn Lynch (2)	Buffalo	RB	19 carries, 61 yards, 1 TD; 3 receptions, 24 yards
11	Ted Ginn Jr.	Miami	WR	87-yard punt return TD; 4 receptions, 52 yards
12	Patrick Willis (3)	San Francisco	LB	18 tackles (17 solo), half-sack
13	Trent Edwards	Buffalo	QB	22/36, 257 yards; game-winning 60-yard scoring drive
14	Trent Edwards (2)	Buffalo	QB	11/23, 165 yards, 4 TD
15	Mason Crosby	Green Bay	PK	4-for-4 FG (long of 50 yards); 3 PAT
16	Patrick Willis (4)	San Francisco	LB	20 tackles (12 solo), 2 sacks, 1 forced fumble, 1 pass defended
17	Brandon Jackson	Green Bay	RB	20 carries, 113 yards; 2 receptions, 22 yards
ROY	Adrian Peterson	Minnesota	RB	1,341 yards, 12 TD; 268 receiving yards, 1 TD

=== 2008 ===
Week	Player	Team	Position	Key statistics and notes
1	Eddie Royal	Denver	WR	9 receptions, 146 yards, 1 TD
2	Felix Jones	Dallas	RB	3 carries, 10 yards; 247 kickoff return yards (98-yard TD)
3	Felix Jones (2)	Dallas	RB	6 carries, 76 yards, 1 TD
4	Chris Horton	Washington	S	3 tackles, 1 INT, 1 pass defended
5	Felix Jones (3)	Dallas	RB	9 carries, 96 yards, 1 TD
6	Matt Ryan	Atlanta	QB	22/30, 301 yards, 1 TD
7	Chris Johnson	Tennessee	RB	18 carries, 168 yards, 1 TD
8	Joe Flacco	Baltimore	QB	12/24, 140 yards, 1 TD; 12-yard rushing TD
9	Chris Johnson (2)	Tennessee	RB	24 carries, 89 yards, 1 TD; 6 receptions, 72 yards
10	Eddie Royal (2)	Denver	WR	6 receptions, 164 yards, 1 TD
11	Spencer Larsen	Denver	FB/LB	7 tackles; first player in DEN history to start on offense (FB) and defense (LB)
12	Matt Forte	Chicago	RB	21 carries, 139 yards, 2 TD
13	Peyton Hillis	Denver	RB	22 carries, 129 yards, 1 TD
14	Ryan Clady	Denver	OT	Allowed QB Jay Cutler to throw for 286 yards, 2 TD; prevented KC from recording a sack; helped DEN total 139 yards rushing
15	Matt Ryan (2)	Atlanta	QB	15/23, 206 yards, 2 INT
16	Matt Ryan (3)	Atlanta	QB	13/24, 134 yards, 1 TD
17	Joe Flacco (2)	Baltimore	QB	17/23, 297 yards
ROY	Joe Flacco	Baltimore	QB	2,971 yards, 14 TD, 12 INT; 180 rushing yards, 2 TD

=== 2009 ===
Week	Player	Team	Position	Key statistics and notes
1	Mark Sanchez	NY Jets	QB	18/33, 272 yards, 1 TD, 1 INT
2	Mark Sanchez (2)	NY Jets	QB	14/22, 163 yards, 1 TD
3	Mark Sanchez (3)	NY Jets	QB	17/30, 171 yards, 2 TD, 1 INT
4	Knowshon Moreno	Denver	RB	14 carries, 65 yards; 2 receptions, 11 yards, 1 TD
5	Knowshon Moreno (2)	Denver	RB	21 carries, 88 yards; 4 receptions, 36 yards
6	Clay Matthews III	Green Bay	LB	3 tackles, 2 sacks, 1 batted pass
7	Percy Harvin	Minnesota	WR	216 all-purpose yards (42 yards receiving, 7 yards rushing, 167 kickoff return yards); 88-yard kickoff return TD
8	Percy Harvin (2)	Minnesota	WR	261 all-purpose yards (84 yards receiving, 2 yards rushing, 175 kickoff return yards); 51-yard receiving TD
9	Mike Wallace	Pittsburgh	WR	4 receptions, 69 yards, 25-yard receiving TD
10	Clay Matthews III (2)	Green Bay	LB	1 tackle, 1 sack, 2 fumble recoveries
11	Matthew Stafford	Detroit	QB	26/43, 422 yards, 5 TD, 2 INT
12	Knowshon Moreno (3)	Denver	RB	19 carries, 88 yards, 1 TD
13	Knowshon Moreno (4)	Denver	RB	21 carries, 86 yards and 2 TD
14	Brian Orakpo	Washington	LB	6 tackles, 4 sacks, 1 forced fumble
15	Mike Wallace (2)	Pittsburgh	WR	2 receptions, 79 yards, 2 TD
16	Jeremy Maclin	Philadelphia	WR	6 receptions, 92 yards
17	Mike Wallace (3)	Pittsburgh	WR	2 receptions, 64 yards, 1 TD
ROY	Percy Harvin	Minnesota	WR	790 yards, 6 TD; 13 rushing yards; 1,156 return yards, 2 TD

=== 2010 ===
Week	Player	Team	Position	Key statistics and notes
1	Dexter McCluster	Kansas City	KR/PR	94-yard punt return TD
2	Jahvid Best	Detroit	RB	17 rushes, 78 yards, 2 TD; 9 receptions, 154 yards, 1 TD
3	Tony Moeaki	Kansas City	TE	4 receptions, 44 yards, 1 TD
4	Sam Bradford	St. Louis	QB	23/41, 289 yards, 1 TD, 1 INT
5	Max Hall	Arizona	QB	17/27, 168 yards, 1 INT
6	Chris Ivory	New Orleans	RB	15 carries, 158 yards; 17 yards passing
7	Dez Bryant	Dallas	WR/PR	171 total yards, 3 TD (including 93-yard punt return TD)
8	Ndamukong Suh	Detroit	DT	2 sacks, 4 tackles, 17-yard fumble return TD
9	Jacoby Ford	Oakland	WR	148 receiving yards, 94-yard kickoff return TD
10	Tim Tebow	Denver	QB	1 passing TD; 1 rushing TD
11	Bryan McCann	Dallas	PR	97-yard punt return TD; 1 tackle
12	Sam Bradford (2)	St. Louis	QB	22/37, 308 yards, 3 TD
13	Sean Lee	Dallas	LB	2 INT, 44 return yards (includes 31-yard INT return TD)
14	Rob Gronkowski	New England	TE	5 receptions, 43 yards, 1 TD
15	Aaron Hernandez	New England	TE	4 receptions, 31 yards, 2 TD
16	Tim Tebow (2)	Denver	QB	16/29, 308 yards, 1 TD, 1 INT; 27 yards rushing, 1 rushing TD
17	Rob Gronkowski (2)	New England	TE	6 receptions, 102 yards, 1 TD
ROY	Ndamukong Suh	Detroit	DT	66 tackles (49 solo), 10 sacks, 1 INT, 1 FF

=== 2011 ===
Week	Player	Team	Position	Key statistics and notes
1	Randall Cobb	Green Bay	WR	2 receptions, 35 yards, 1 TD; record-tying 108-yard kickoff return TD
2	Denarius Moore	Oakland	WR	5 receptions, 146 yards, 1 TD
3	Stefen Wisniewski	Oakland	G	Helped lead key blocks for OAK ground game that totalled 234 yards of offense
4	Cam Newton	Carolina	QB	27/46, 374 yards, 1 TD, 1 INT; 8 rushes, 35 yards, 2 TD
5	Aldon Smith	San Francisco	LB	2 tackles, 2 sacks
6	Aldon Smith (2)	San Francisco	LB	4 tackles, 2 sacks, 1 safety, 1 forced fumble
7	DeMarco Murray	Dallas	RB	Single-game franchise record 253 rushing yards, 1 TD
8	Marcell Dareus	Buffalo	DE	4 tackles, 2.5 sacks
9	Andy Dalton	Cincinnati	QB	22/39, 217 yards, 3 TD
10	Denarius Moore (2)	Oakland	WR	5 receptions, 123 yards, 2 TD
11	Torrey Smith	Baltimore	WR	6 receptions, 165 yards, 1 TD
12	Andy Dalton (2)	Cincinnati	QB	21/31, 270 yards, 1 TD
13	Colin McCarthy	Tennessee	LB	9 tackles, 1 forced fumble, 2 fumble recoveries
14	T.J. Yates	Houston	QB	26 of 44, 300 yards, 2 TD, 1 INT
15	Cam Newton (2)	Carolina	QB	13/23, 149 yards, 2 TD; 7 carries, 55 yards
16	Cam Newton (3)	Carolina	QB	12/17, 171 yards, 3 TD; 6 carries, 65 yards, 1 TD
17	Sterling Moore	New England	CB	1 assisted tackle, 2 INT; includes a 21-yard INT return for a TD
ROY	Cam Newton	Carolina	QB	4,051 yards, 21 TD, 17 INT; 706 rushing yards, 14 TD

=== 2012 ===
Week	Player	Team	Position	Key statistics and notes
1	Robert Griffin III	Washington	QB	19/26, 320 yards, 2 TD; 9 carries, 42 yards
2	Trent Richardson	Cleveland	RB	19 carries, 109 yards, 1 TD; 4 receptions, 36 yards, 1 TD
3	Andrew Luck	Indianapolis	QB	22/46, 313 yards, 2 TD, 1 INT; 4 carries, 50 yards
4	Robert Griffin III (2)	Washington	QB	26/35, 323 yards; 8 carries, 36 yards, 1 TD
5	Andrew Luck (2)	Indianapolis	QB	31/55, 362 yards, 2 TD, 1 INT
6	Robert Griffin III (3)	Washington	QB	17/22, 182 yards, 1 TD; 8 carries, 138 yards, 2 TD
7	Alfred Morris	Washington	RB	22 carries, 120 yards
8	Andrew Luck (3)	Indianapolis	QB	26/38, 297 yards, 1 TD
9	Doug Martin	Tampa Bay	RB	25 carries, 251 yards, 4 TD; 4 receptions, 21 yards
10	Russell Wilson	Seattle	QB	12/19, 188 yards, 2 TD; 7 carries, 34 yards
11	Robert Griffin III (4)	Washington	QB	14/15, 200 yards, 4 TD; 12 carries, 84 yards, 158.3 passer rating
12	Robert Griffin III (5)	Washington	QB	20/28, 311 yards, 4 TD, 1 INT; 7 carries, 29 yards
13	Robert Griffin III (6)	Washington	QB	13/21, 163 yards, 1 TD; 5 carries, 72 yards
14	Alfred Morris (2)	Washington	RB	23 carries, 129 yards, 1 TD, 1 fumble
15	Kirk Cousins	Washington	QB	26/37, 329 yards, 2 TD, 1 INT
16	Robert Griffin III (7)	Washington	QB	16/24, 198 yards, 2 TD, 1 INT
17	Alfred Morris (3)	Washington	RB	33 carries, 200 yards, 3 TD
ROY	Russell Wilson	Seattle	QB	3,118 yards, 26 TD, 10 INT; 489 rushing yards, 4 TD

=== 2013 ===
Week	Player	Team	Position	Key statistics and notes
1	Caleb Sturgis	Miami	PK	3-for-3 FG, 2-for-2 PAT
2	EJ Manuel	Buffalo	QB	27/39, 296 yards, 1 TD, 1 INT; 4 carries, 13 yards
3	Giovani Bernard	Cincinnati	RB	10 carries, 50 yard, 1 TD; 4 receptions, 49 yards
4	Kiko Alonso	Buffalo	LB	5 combined tackles, 2 INT
5	Geno Smith	NY Jets	QB	16/20, 199 yards, 3 TD; 3 carries, 21 yards
6	Keenan Allen	San Diego	WR	9 receptions, 107 yards, 1 TD
7	D. J. Fluker	San Diego	OT	Offense produced season high 158 rushing yards
8	Sio Moore	Oakland	LB	6 combined tackles, 1.5 sacks
9	Eddie Lacy	Green Bay	RB	22 carries, 150 yards, 1 TD
10	Tavon Austin	St. Louis	WR	2 receptions, 138 yards, 2 TDs
11	Matt McGloin	Oakland	QB	18/32, 197 yards, 3 TDs
12	Keenan Allen (2)	San Diego	WR	9 receptions, 124 yards
13	Zach Ertz	Philadelphia	TE	5 receptions, 68 yards, 2 TDs
14	Marlon Brown	Baltimore	WR	7 receptions, 92 yards, 1 TD
15	Keenan Allen (3)	San Diego	WR	2 receptions, 29 yards, 2 TDs
16	Le'Veon Bell	Pittsburgh	RB	26 carries, 124 yards, 1 TD
17	Keenan Allen (4)	San Diego	WR	5 receptions, 89 yards
ROY	Keenan Allen	San Diego	WR	1,046 yards, 8 TD

=== 2014 ===
Week	Player	Team	Position	Key statistics and notes
1	Kelvin Benjamin	Carolina	WR	6 receptions, 92 yards, 1 TD
2	Sammy Watkins	Buffalo	WR	8 receptions, 117 yards, 1 TD
3	Kyle Fuller	Chicago	CB	1 INT, 2 forced fumbles, 7 tackles
4	Teddy Bridgewater	Minnesota	QB	19/30, 317 yards; 5 carries, 27 yards, 1 rushing TD
5	Branden Oliver	San Diego	RB	19 carries, 118 yards, 1 TD; 4 receptions, 68 yards
6	Branden Oliver (2)	San Diego	RB	26 carries, 101 yards, 1 TD; 4 receptions, 23 yards
7	Sammy Watkins (2)	Buffalo	WR	9 receptions, 122 yards, 2 TD
8	Sammy Watkins (3)	Buffalo	WR	3 receptions, 157 yards, 1 TD
9	Jeremy Hill	Cincinnati	RB	24 carries, 154 yards, 2 TD
10	Chris Borland	San Francisco	LB	11 tackles, 1 fumble recovery
11	Chris Borland (2)	San Francisco	LB	12 tackles, 2 INT
12	Odell Beckham Jr.	NY Giants	WR	10 receptions, 146 yards, 2 TD
13	Teddy Bridgewater (2)	Minnesota	QB	15/21, 138 yards, 2 TD
14	Derek Carr	Oakland	QB	22/28, 254 yards, 3 TD
15	Odell Beckham Jr. (2)	NY Giants	WR	12 receptions, 143 yards, 3 TD
16	Odell Beckham Jr. (3)	NY Giants	WR	8 receptions, 148 yards, 2 TD
17	Odell Beckham Jr. (4)	NY Giants	WR	12 receptions, 185 yards, 1 TD
ROY	Teddy Bridgewater	Minnesota	QB	2,919 yards, 14 TD, 12 INT; 209 rushing yards, 1 TD

=== 2015 ===
Week	Player	Team	Position	Key statistics and notes
1	Marcus Mariota	Tennessee	QB	13/16, 209 yards, 4 TD, 158.3 passer rating
2	Jameis Winston	Tampa Bay	QB	14/21, 207 yards, 1 TD
3	Kwon Alexander	Tampa Bay	LB	1 INT, 2 passes defended, 10 tackles
4	Todd Gurley	St. Louis	RB	19 carries, 146 yards, 1 fumble; 2 receptions, 15 yards
5	Jameis Winston (2)	Tampa Bay	QB	13/19, 209 yards, 1 TD
6	Stefon Diggs	Minnesota	WR	7 receptions, 129 yards
7	Amari Cooper	Oakland	WR	5 receptions, 133 yards, 1 TD
8	Kwon Alexander (2)	Tampa Bay	LB	1 INT, 1 forced fumble, 1 fumble recovery, 11 tackles
9	Amari Cooper (2)	Oakland	WR	7 receptions, 88 yards, 1 TD
10	Mario Edwards Jr.	Oakland	DE	1 sack, 11 tackles
11	Jameis Winston (3)	Tampa Bay	QB	19/29, 246 yards, 5 TD
12	Amari Cooper (3)	Oakland	WR	7 receptions, 115 yards
13	Thomas Rawls	Seattle	RB	21 carries, 81 yds, 1 TD; 3 receptions, 22 yards
14	Tyler Lockett	Oakland	WR	6 receptions, 104 yards, 2 TD
15	Amari Cooper (4)	Oakland	WR	6 receptions, 120 yards, 2 TD
16	Preston Smith	Washington	OLB	3 sacks, 1 forced fumble
17	Tyler Lockett (2)	Seattle	WR	139 punt return yards, 36 yards receiving, 7 yards rushing
ROY	Jameis Winston	Tampa Bay	QB	4,042 yards, 22 TD, 15 INT; 213 rushing yards, 6 TD

=== 2016 ===
Week	Player	Team	Position	Key statistics and notes
1	Carson Wentz	Philadelphia	QB	22/37, 278 yards, 2 TD
2	Corey Coleman	Cleveland	WR	5 receptions, 104 yards, 2 TD
3	Carson Wentz (2)	Philadelphia	QB	23/31, 301 yards, 2 TD
4	Dak Prescott	Dallas	QB	23/32, 245 yards, 2 TD
5	Carson Wentz (3)	Philadelphia	QB	25/33, 238 yards, 2 TD, 1 INT
6	Jatavis Brown	San Diego	LB	13 tackles, 1 sack
7	Joey Bosa	San Diego	DE	4 tackles, 2 sacks
8	Dak Prescott (2)	Dallas	QB	19/39, 287 yards, 2 TD, 1 INT, 1 rushing TD
9	Dak Prescott (3)	Dallas	QB	21/27, 247 yards, 3 TD
10	Ezekiel Elliott	Dallas	RB	21 carries, 114 yards, 2 TD; 2 receptions; 95 yards, 1 TD
11	Dak Prescott (4)	Dallass	QB	27/36, 301 yards, 3 TD
12	Noah Spence	Tampa Bay	DE	5 tackles, 1.5 sacks, 1 forced fumble
13	Ezekiel Elliott (2)	Dallas	RB	20 carries, 86 yards, 1 TD
14	Ezekiel Elliott (3)	Dallas	RB	24 carries, 107 yards
15	Ezekiel Elliott (4)	Dallas	RB	23 carries, 159 yards, 1 TD
16	Dak Prescott (5)	Dallas	QB	15/19, 212 yards, 3 TD
17	Tyreek Hill	Kansas City	WR	95-yard punt return TD; 5 receptions, 46 yards; 3 carries, 15 yards
ROY	Dak Prescott	Dallas	QB	3,667 yards, 23 TD, 4 INT; 282 rushing yards, 6 TD

=== 2017 ===
Week	Player	Team	Position	Key statistics and notes
1	Kareem Hunt	Kansas City	RB	17 carries, 148 yards, 1 TD; 5 receptions, 98 yards, 2 TD
2	Tyus Bowser	Baltimore	LB	2 tackles, 1 sack, 1 interception
3	Jake Elliott	Philadelphia	PK	2-for-3 FGs, 61-yard game-winning FG
4	Alvin Kamara	New Orleans	RB	5 carries, 25 yards; 10 receptions, 71 yards, 1 TD
5	Aaron Jones	Green Bay	RB	19 carries, 125 yards, 1 TD; 1 reception, 9 yards
6	Marshon Lattimore	New Orleans	CB	5 tackles, 1 INT returned for TD
7	Aaron Jones (2)	Green Bay	RB	17 carries, 131 yards, 1 TD; 3 receptions, 7 yards
8	Marshon Lattimore (2)	New Orleans	CB	3 tackles, 1 INT
9	Alvin Kamara (2)	New Orleans	RB	10 carries, 68 yards, 1 TD; 6 receptions, 84 yards, 1 TD
10	Alvin Kamara (3)	New Orleans	RB	12 carries, 106 yards, 1 TD; 5 receptions for 32 yards
11	Alvin Kamara (4)	New Orleans	RB	8 carries, 42 yards; 6 receptions, 74 yards, 1 TD
12	Alvin Kamara (5)	New Orleans	RB	5 carries, 87 yards, 1 TD; 6 receptions, 101 yards, 1 TD
13	Alvin Kamara (6) (Note: Record for most consecutive)	New Orleans	RB	9 carries, 60 yards, 2 TD, 5 receptions, 66 yards
14	Jamaal Williams	Green Bay	RB	15 carries, 49 yards, 1 TD; 7 receptions, 69 yards, 1 TD
15	Marshon Lattimore (3)	New Orleans	CB	5 tackles, 3 pass breakups, 1 INT
16	Marshon Lattimore (4)	New Orleans	CB	6 tackles, 4 pass breakups, 1 INT
17	Alvin Kamara (7)	New Orleans	RB	9 carries, 44 yards, 1 TD; 6 receptions, 84 yards
ROY	Alvin Kamara	New Orleans	RB	728 yards, 8 TD; 826 receiving yards, 5 TD; 347 return yards, 1 TD

=== 2018 ===
Week	Player	Team	Position	Key statistics and notes
1	Denzel Ward	Cleveland	CB	6 tackles, 3 passes defensed, 2 interceptions
2	Shaquille Leonard	Indianapolis	LB	18 tackles, 1 pass defensed, 1 sack, 1 forced fumble
3	Baker Mayfield	Cleveland	QB	Came in late in the 2nd Quarter; 17/23, 201 yards, 2-PC reception
4	Nick Chubb	Cleveland	RB	3 carries, 105 yards, 2 TD
5	Denzel Ward (2)	Cleveland	CB	5 tackles, 3 passes defensed, 1 INT, 1 blocked field goal
6	Saquon Barkley	NY Giants	RB	229 scrimmage yards (130 rushing, 99 receiving), 50-yard TD run
7	Baker Mayfield (2)	Cleveland	QB	23/34, 215 yards, 2 TD; 4 rushes, 43 yards
8	Shaquille Leonard (2)	Indianapolis	LB	9 tackles, 1 forced fumble
9	Baker Mayfield (3)	Cleveland	QB	29/42, 297 yards, 2 TD
10	Nick Chubb (2)	Cleveland	RB	209 scrimmage yards, 2 TD, franchise record 92-yard TD run
11	Tre'Quan Smith	New Orleans	WR	10 receptions, 157 yards, 1 TD
12	Baker Mayfield (4)	Cleveland	QB	19/26, 258 yards, 4 TD
13	Phillip Lindsay	Denver	RB	19 carries, 157 yards, 2 TD
14	Baker Mayfield (5)	Cleveland	QB	18/22, 238 yards, 1 TD, 126.9 passer rating
15	Jaylen Samuels	Pittsburgh	RB	172 scrimmage yards (142 rushing, 30 receiving)
16	Baker Mayfield (6)	Cleveland	QB	27/37, 284 yards, 3 TD
17	Baker Mayfield (7)	Cleveland	QB	23/42, 376 yards, 3 TD
ROY	Saquon Barkley	NY Giants	RB	1,307 yards, 11 TD; 721 receiving yards, 4 TD

=== 2019 ===
Week	Player	Team	Position	Key statistics and notes
1	Gardner Minshew	Jacksonville	QB	22/25, 275 yards, 2 TD, 122.5 passer rating
2	Chase Winovich	New England	DE	2 tackles, 1.5 sacks
3	Gardner Minshew (2)	Jacksonville	QB	20/30, 204 yards, 2 TD
4	Gardner Minshew (3)	Jacksonville	QB	19/33, 213 yards, 2 TD
5	Gardner Minshew (4)	Jacksonville	QB	26/44, 374 yards, 2 TD
6	Kyler Murray	Arizona	QB	27/37, 340 yards, 3 TD, 128.2 passer rating
7	Gardner Minshew (5)	Jacksonville	QB	15/32, 255 yards, 1 TD
8	Gardner Minshew (6)	Jacksonville	QB	22/34, 279 yards, 3 TD
9	DK Metcalf	Seattle	WR	6 receptions, 123 yards, 1 TD
10	Josh Jacobs	Oakland	RB	16 carries, 71 yards, 1 TD; 3 receptions, 30 yards, 1 receiving TD
11	Maxx Crosby	Oakland	DE	5 tackles, 4 sacks, 1 forced fumble
12	A. J. Brown	Tennessee	WR	4 receptions, 135 yards, 1 touchdown
13	Ed Oliver	Buffalo	DT	4 tackles, 2 sacks, 1 forced fumble
14	Drew Lock	Denver	QB	22/27, 309 yards, 3 TD, 136.0 passer rating
15	Dwayne Haskins	Washington	QB	19/28, 261 yards, 2 TD
16	Daniel Jones	NY Giants	QB	28/42, 352 yards, 5 TD, 132.1 passer rating
17	Gardner Minshew (7)	Jacksonville	QB	27/39, 295 yards, 3 TD, 106.2 passer rating
ROY	Nick Bosa	San Francisco	DE	47 tackles (32 solo), 16 TFL, 9 sacks, 1 INT, 2 FR

=== 2020 ===
Week	Player	Team	Position	Key statistics and notes
1	C. J. Henderson	Jacksonville	CB	5 tackles, 1 interception, 3 passes defended
2	Justin Herbert	LA Chargers	QB	22/33, 311 yards, 1 TD; 1 rushing TD
3	Brandon Aiyuk	San Francisco	WR	5 receptions, 70 yards; 3 carries, 31 yards, 1 TD
4	Justin Herbert (2)	LA Chargers	QB	20/25, 290 yards, 3 TD, 137.9 passer rating
5	Justin Herbert (3)	LA Chargers	QB	20/34, 264 yards, 4 TD, 122.7 passer rating
6	Justin Jefferson	Minnesota	WR	9 receptions, 166 yards, 2 TD
7	Justin Herbert (4)	LA Chargers	QB	27/43, 347 yards, 3 TD, 111.3 passer rating; 66 rushing yards, 1 TD
8	Justin Herbert (5)	LA Chargers	QB	29/43, 278 yards, 3 TD
9	Justin Herbert (6)	LA Chargers	QB	28/42, 326 yards, 2 TD, 105.9 passer rating
10	Jedrick Wills	Cleveland	OT	Offense produced 231 rushing yards, 1 TD
11	Justin Herbert (7)	LA Chargers	QB	37/49, 366 yards, 3 TD, 116.5 passer rating
12	Antonio Gibson	Washington	RB	21 carries, 115 yards, 3 TD
13	Tua Tagovailoa	Miami	QB	26/39, 296 yards, 1 TD
14	Tua Tagovailoa (2)	Miami	QB	28/48, 316 yards, 2 TD
15	Justin Herbert (8)	LA Chargers	QB	22/32, 314 yards, 2 TD, 121.1 passer rating, 1 rushing TD
16	A. J. Dillon	Green Bay	RB	21 carries, 124 yards, 2 TD
17	Justin Herbert (9)	LA Chargers	QB	22/31, 302 yards, 3 TD
ROY	Justin Herbert	LA Chargers	QB	4,336 yards, 31 TD, 10 INT; 234 rushing yards, 5 TD

=== 2021 ===
Week	Player	Team	Position	Key statistics and notes
1	Ja'Marr Chase	Cincinnati	WR	5 receptions, 101 yards, 1 TD
2	Asante Samuel Jr.	LA Chargers	CB	4 tackles, 3 passes defended
3	Asante Samuel Jr. (2)	LA Chargers	CB	1 tackle, 1 pass defended
4	Zach Wilson	NY Jets	QB	21/34, 297 yards, 2 TD
5	Ja'Marr Chase (2)	Cincinnati	WR	4 receptions, 159 yards, 1 TD
6	Ja'Marr Chase (3)	Cincinnati	WR	4 receptions, 97 yards
7	Ja'Marr Chase (4)	Cincinnati	WR	8 receptions, 201 yards, 1 TD
8	Micah Parsons	Dallas	LB	11 tackles, 4 TFL
9	Javonte Williams	Denver	RB	17 carries, 111 yards
10	Micah Parsons (2)	Dallas	LB	6 tackles, TFL, Sack
11	Elijah Moore	NY Jets	WR	11 receptions, 141 yards; 1 carry, 15 yards, 1 TD
12	Patrick Surtain II	Denver	CB	5 tackles, 2 passes defended, 2 INT, 1 INT return for TD
13	Zach Wilson (2)	NY Jets	QB	23/38, 226 yards, 2 TD, 1 rushing TD
14	Micah Parsons (3)	Dallas	LB	3 tackles, 2 sacks, TFL, forced fumble
15	Brandin Echols	NY Jets	CB	4 tackles, 3 passes defended, 20-yard INT return for TD
16	Zach Wilson (3)	NY Jets	QB	14/22, 102 yards, TD; 91 rushing yards, 52-yard TD
17	Ja'Marr Chase (5)	Cincinnati	WR	11 receptions, 266 yards, 3 TD
18	Amon-Ra St. Brown	Detroit	WR	8 receptions, 109 yards, 1 TD
ROY	Ja'Marr Chase	Cincinnati	WR	81 receptions, 1,455 yards, 13 TD; 21 rushing yards

=== 2022 ===
Week	Player	Team	Position	Key statistics and notes
1	Jahan Dotson	Washington	WR	3 receptions, 40 yards, 2 TD
2	Garrett Wilson	NY Jets	WR	8 receptions, 102 yards, 2 TD
3	Romeo Doubs	Green Bay	WR	8 receptions, 73 yards, 1 TD
4	Breece Hall	NY Jets	RB	18 carries, 97 yards, 1 TD; 2 receptions, 100 yards
5	Sauce Gardner	NY Jets	CB	5 tackles, 1 pass defended, 1 INT
6	Breece Hall (2)	NY Jets	RB	20 carries, 116 yards, 1 TD; 2 receptions, 5 yards
7	Sauce Gardner (2)	NY Jets	CB	8 tackles
8	Garrett Wilson (2)	NY Jets	WR	6 receptions, 117 yards
9	Sauce Gardner (3)	NY Jets	CB	7 tackles, 1 pass defended, 1 INT
10	Christian Watson	Green Bay	WR	4 receptions, 107 yards, 3 TD
11	Aidan Hutchinson	Detroit	DE	8 tackles, 1 sack
12	Garrett Wilson (3)	NY Jets	WR	5 receptions, 95 yards, 2 TD
13	Garrett Wilson (4)	NY Jets	WR	8 receptions, 162 yards
14	Zonovan Knight	NY Jets	RB	71 rush yards, 1 TD
15	Jahan Dotson (2)	Washington	WR	4 receptions, 105 yards, 1 TD
16	Brock Purdy	San Francisco	QB	15/22, 234 yards, 2 TD, INT
17	James Houston	Detroit	LB	3 tackles, 3 sacks, 1 force fumble
18	Brock Purdy	San Francisco	QB	15/20, 178 yards, 3 TD
ROY	Aidan Hutchinson	Detroit	DE	52 tackles (34 solo), 9 TFL, 9.5 sacks, 3 INT, 2 FR

=== 2023 ===
Week	Player	Team	Position	Key statistics and notes
1	Xavier Gipson	NY Jets	WR	65-yard punt return TD
2	Puka Nacua	LA Rams	WR	15 receptions, 147 yards
3	De'Von Achane	Miami	RB	18 carries, 203 yards, 2 TD; 4 receptions, 30 yards, 2 TD
4	Puka Nacua (2)	LA Rams	WR	9 receptions, 163 yards, 1 TD
5	De'Von Achane (2)	Miami	RB	11 carries, 151 yards, 1 TD; 1 reception, 14 yards
6	Byron Young	LA Rams	LB	6 tackles, 1 sack, 1 forced fumble
7	Puka Nacua (3)	LA Rams	WR	12 receptions, 154 yards
8	Will Levis	Tennessee	QB	19/29, 239 yards, 4 TD
9	C. J. Stroud	Houston	QB	30/42, 470 yards, 5 TD
10	C. J. Stroud (2)	Houston	QB	23/39, 356 yards, 1 TD, 1 INT
11	Tommy DeVito	NY Giants	QB	18/26, 246 yards, 3 TD
12	Jalin Hyatt	NY Giants	WR	5 receptions, 109 yards
13	Sam LaPorta	Detroit	TE	8 receptions, 140 yards, 1 TD
14	Tommy DeVito (2)	NY Giants	QB	17/21, 158 yards, 1 TD
15	Sam LaPorta (2)	Detroit	TE	5 receptions, 56 yards, 3 TD
16	Puka Nacua (4)	LA Rams	WR	9 receptions for 164 yards, 1 TD
17	Zay Flowers	Baltimore	WR	3 receptions, 106 yards, 1 TD
18	C. J. Stroud (3)	Houston	QB	20/26, 264 yards, 2 TD
ROY	C. J. Stroud	Houston	QB	4,108 yards, 23 TD, 5 INT; 167 rushing yards, 3 TD

=== 2024 ===
Week	Player	Team	Position	Key statistics and notes
1	Jayden Daniels	Washington	QB	17/24, 184 yards; 88 rushing yards, 2 TD
2	Braelon Allen	NY Jets	RB	7 carries, 33 yards, 1 TD; 2 receptions, 23 yards, 1 TD
3	Jayden Daniels (2)	Washington	QB	21/23, 254 yards, 2 TD; 39 rushing yards, 1 TD
4	Jayden Daniels (3)	Washington	QB	26/30, 233 yards, 1 TD; 47 rushing yards, 1 TD
5	Jayden Daniels (4)	Washington	QB	14/25, 238 yards, 1 TD; 82 rushing yards
6	Jayden Daniels (5)	Washington	QB	24/35, 269 yards, 2 TD; 22 rushing yards
7	Keon Coleman	Buffalo	WR	4 receptions, 125 yards
8	Jayden Daniels (6)	Washington	QB	21/38, 326 yards, 1 TD; 52 rushing yards
9	Jayden Daniels (7)	Washington	QB	15/22, 209 yards, 2 TD; 35 rushing yards
10	Bo Nix	Denver	QB	22/30, 215 yards, 2 TD
11	Bo Nix (2)	Denver	QB	28/33, 307 yards, 4 TD
12	Bo Nix (3)	Denver	QB	25/42, 273 yards, 2 TD
13	Jayden Daniels (8)	Washington	QB	25/30, 206 yards, 3 TD; 34 rushing yards, 1 TD
14	Tyrice Knight	Seattle	LB	12 tackles, 2 pass deflections
15	Jayden Daniels (9)	Washington	QB	25/31, 226 yards, 2 TD; 66 rushing yards
16	Jayden Daniels (10)	Washington	QB	24/39, 258 yards, 5 TD; 81 rushing yards
17	Jayden Daniels (11) (Note: Record for most in a season)	Washington	QB	24/36, 227 yards, 3 TD; 127 rushing yards
18	Mike Sainristil	Washington	CB	10 tackles, 3 pass breakups
ROY	Jayden Daniels	Washington	QB	3,568 yards, 25 TD, 9 INT; 891 rushing yards, 6 TD

=== 2025 ===
Week	Player	Team	Position	Key statistics and notes
1	Jacory Croskey-Merritt	Washington	RB	10 carries, 82 yards, TD
2	Tyler Warren	Indianapolis	TE	4 receptions, 79 yards
3	Jaylin Lane	Washington	WR	5 punt returns for 127 yards; TD
4	Woody Marks	Houston	RB	17 carries, 69 yards, TD; 4 receptions, 50 yards, TD
5	Jacory Croskey-Merritt (2)	Washington	RB	14 carries, 111 yards, 2 TDs; 2 receptions, 39 yards
6	Tetairoa McMillan	Carolina	WR	3 receptions, 29 yards, 2 TDs
7	Oronde Gadsden II	LA Chargers	TE	5 receptions, 77 yards, 1 TD
8	RJ Harvey	Denver	RB	7 carries, 46 yards, 2 TD; 1 reception, 5 yards, 1 TD; 1 kickoff return for 26 yards
9	Jalon Walker	Atlanta	LB	4 tackles, 2 TFL, 2 sacks, 1 forced fumble
10	Nick Emmanwori	Seattle	S	5 tackles, 4 assists, ½ sack, 4 passes defended
11	Carson Schwesinger	Cleveland	LB	8 tackles, 2 assists, 2 TFL, 1 INT, 1 pass defended
12	Barrett Carter	Cincinnati	LB	16 total tackles, 8 assists, 8 solo
13	TreVeyon Henderson	New England	RB	11 carries, 67 yards; 3 receptions, 19 yards
14	Shedeur Sanders	Cleveland	QB	23/42, 364 yards, 3 TD, 1 INT; 3 rushes, 29 yards, 1 TD
15	Jacory Croskey-Merritt (3)	Washington	RB	18 carries, 96 yards, 1 TD
16	Ashton Jeanty	Las Vegas	RB	24 carries, 128 yards, 1 TD; 1 reception, 60 yards, 1 TD
17	Jacory Croskey-Merritt (4)	Washington	RB	11 carries, 105 yards, 2 TD
18	Colston Loveland	Chicago	TE	10 receptions, 91 yards, 1 TD
ROY	Tyler Shough	New Orleans	QB	2,384 yards, 10 TD, 6 INT; 186 rushing yards, 3 TD

=== 2026 ===
Week	Player	Team	Position	Key statistics and notes
1	Antonio Williams	Washington	WR	4 receptions, 64 yards, 1 TD
2	Hezekiah Masses	Las Vegas	CB	5 tackles, 2 INT, 2 pass deflections
3	Kenyon Sadiq	NY Jets	TE	7 receptions, 105 yards, 1 TD
4	Arvell Reese	NY Giants	LB	9 tackles (1 TFL), 3 pass deflections, 1 INT
5	David Bailey	NY Jets	DE	7 tackles (3 TFL), 3 sacks
6	Omar Cooper Jr.	NY Jets	WR	6 receptions, 103 yards, 1 TD
7	Omar Cooper Jr. (2)	NY Jets	WR	5 receptions, 115 yards, 1 TD
8	Emmett Johnson	Kansas City	RB	1 carry, 15 yards; 5 receptions, 128 yards, 1 TD (73-yard touchdown reception)
9	Arvell Reese (2)	NY Giants	LB	12 tackles, (3 TFL), 3 sacks, 1 forced fumble
10	Emmett Johnson (2)	Kansas City	RB	22 rushes, 101 yards; 6 receptions, 70 yards, 2 TD

== Statistics ==
=== Most total awards ===
Weeks	Player	Team	Position	Season
11	Jayden Daniels	Washington	QB	2024
9	Ben Roethlisberger	Pittsburgh	QB	2004
9	Justin Herbert	LA Chargers	QB	2020
7	Robert Griffin III	Washington	QB	2012
7	Alvin Kamara	New Orleans	RB	2017
7	Baker Mayfield	Cleveland	QB	2018
7	Gardner Minshew	Jacksonville	QB	2019

=== Most consecutive awards ===
Weeks	Player	Team	Position	Season
5	Alvin Kamara	New Orleans	RB	2017 (Weeks 9–13)
4	Domanick Davis	Houston	RB	2003 (Weeks 7–10)
4	Ben Roethlisberger	Pittsburgh	QB	2004 (Weeks 3–6)
4	Jayden Daniels	Washington	QB	2024 (Weeks 3–6)

== See also ==
- Pepsi NFL Rookie of the Year
