= Lamar High School (South Carolina) =

Location
- 216 N. Darlington Avenue; Lamar, South Carolina, Darlington County; United States; 34°10′16″N 80°03′21″W

Information
- Type: Public, secondary
- School district: Darlington County School District
- Principal: Marlon Thomas
- Teaching staff: 24.00 (FTE)
- Grades: 9–12
- Enrollment: 247 (2023–2024)
- Student to teacher ratio: 10.29
- Colors: Silver, black, and white
- Mascot: Silver Foxes
- Yearbook: The Elixir
- Website: lhs.dcsdschools.org

Lamar High School is a four-year public high school located in Lamar, South Carolina. Approximately 250 students attend the school.

== Athletics ==
Lamar High School is home to the Silver Foxes. The school competes in SCHSL Division A Region 6.

=== State championships ===
- Baseball: 2003
- Football: 2002, 2003, 2004, 2015, 2017
- Track - Boys: 1998, 1999, 2000, 2001, 2002, 2003, 2004, 2005
- Track - Girls: 1980, 1981, 1982, 1983, 2004, 2007

== Notable alumni ==
- John Abraham, NFL defensive end
- David Beasley, 113th South Carolina Governor
- Cobie Durant, NFL defensive back
- B. J. Goodson, NFL linebacker
- Michael Hamlin, NFL defensive back
- Levon Kirkland, NFL linebacker
- Marshall McFadden, NFL linebacker
- Tommy Suggs, South Carolina Gamecocks quarterback, sports commentator
