= Lamar, South Carolina =

- Town
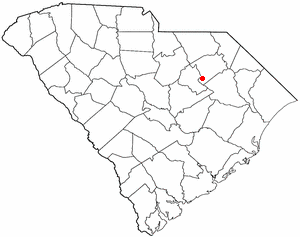
- Location of Lamar, South Carolina
- Coordinates: 34°10′10″N 80°03′54″W
- Country: United States
- State: South Carolina
- County: Darlington

Area
  - Total: 1.21 sq mi (3.14 km^{2})
  - Land: 1.21 sq mi (3.14 km^{2})
  - Water: 0 sq mi (0.00 km^{2})
- Elevation: 174 ft (53 m)

Population (2020)
  - Total: 862
  - Density: 710.6/sq mi (274.38/km^{2})
- Time zone: UTC-5 (Eastern (EST))
  - Summer (DST): UTC-4 (EDT)
- ZIP code: 29069
- Area codes: 843, 854
- FIPS code: 45-39805
- GNIS feature ID: 2405981
- Website: www.lamarsc.org

Lamar is a town in Darlington County, South Carolina, United States. As of the 2020 census, Lamar had a population of 862. It is part of the Florence, SC Metropolitan Statistical Area.

== History ==
In March 2019, the Mayor of Lamar, Darnell Byrd McPherson, called police to her home to investigate a hate crime. She said her car and her husband's car had been sprayed with a yellow substance by some vandals. However, police determined that the substance was just pollen. The current mayor of Lamar is named James Howell.

== Geography ==
Lamar is located in southwestern Darlington County. U.S. Route 401 passes through the town, leading northeast 14 miles (23 km) to Darlington, the county seat, and southwest 24 miles (39 km) to Sumter. Exit 131 on Interstate 20 is 3 miles (5 km) to the northeast of Lamar on US 401.

According to the United States Census Bureau, the town has a total area of 1.2 square miles (3.0 km^{2}), all land.

== Demographics ==
Historical population
Census	Pop.	Note	%±
1900	220		—
1910	592		169.1%
1920	784		32.4%
1930	915		16.7%
1940	921		0.7%
1950	958		4.0%
1960	1,121		17.0%
1970	1,250		11.5%
1980	1,333		6.6%
1990	1,125		−15.6%
2000	1,015		−9.8%
2010	989		−2.6%
2020	862		−12.8%
U.S. Decennial Census

As of the census of 2000, there were 1,015 people, 417 households, and 286 families residing in the town. The population density was 874.6 inhabitants per square mile (337.7/km^{2}). There were 467 housing units at an average density of 402.4 per square mile (155.4/km^{2}). The racial makeup of the town was 53.50% White, 45.71% African American, 0.10% Native American, 0.10% Asian, and 0.59% from two or more races. Hispanic or Latino of any race were 0.89% of the population.

There were 417 households, out of which 24.2% had children under the age of 18 living with them, 46.0% were married couples living together, 18.2% had a female householder with no husband present, and 31.2% were non-families. 29.3% of all households were made up of individuals, and 15.3% had someone living alone who was 65 years of age or older. The average household size was 2.43 and the average family size was 3.01.

In the town, the population was spread out, with 24.5% under the age of 18, 6.9% from 18 to 24, 25.7% from 25 to 44, 25.8% from 45 to 64, and 17.0% who were 65 years of age or older. The median age was 41 years. For every 100 females, there were 91.1 males. For every 100 females age 18 and over, there were 81.9 males.

The median income for a household in the town was $28,571, and the median income for a family was $35,789. Males had a median income of $29,000 versus $26,250 for females. The per capita income for the town was $15,473. About 22.4% of families and 24.4% of the population were below the poverty line, including 35.7% of those under age 18 and 17.7% of those age 65 or over.

== Education ==
Lamar has a public library, a branch of the Darlington County Library System. Lamar is also home to Lamar High School.

== Notable people ==
- John Abraham, former NFL outside linebacker
- David Beasley, Executive Director of World Food Programme and 113th governor of South Carolina
- John Boston, former slave who was a representative for the South Carolina House of Representatives
- Cobie Durant, NFL cornerback
- B. J. Goodson, NFL player
- Michael Hamlin, former NFL safety
- Levon Kirkland, former NFL linebacker
- Marshall McFadden, former NFL player
- James Dudley, former NBA player
