= Cobie Durant =

American football player (born 1998)

No. 2 – Dallas Cowboys
- Position: Cornerback
- Roster status: Active

Personal information
- Born: February 9, 1998 (age 28); Lamar, South Carolina, U.S.
- Listed height: 5 ft 11 in (1.80 m)
- Listed weight: 187 lb (85 kg)

Career information
- High school: Lamar
- College: South Carolina State (2018–2021)
- NFL draft: 2022: 4th round, 142nd overall pick

Career history
- Los Angeles Rams (2022–2025); Dallas Cowboys (2026–present)

Awards and highlights
- Black College Football Pro Player of the Year (2025); First-team All-MEAC (2021); Second-team All-MEAC (2019)

Career NFL statistics as of Week 10, 2026
- Total tackles: 157
- Sacks: 2.0
- Forced fumbles: 2
- Fumble recoveries: 1
- Pass deflections: 28
- Interceptions: 7
- Defensive touchdowns: 2
- Stats at Pro Football Reference

Decobie Durant (born February 9, 1998) is an American professional football cornerback for the Dallas Cowboys of the National Football League (NFL). He played college football for the South Carolina State Bulldogs and was selected by the Los Angeles Rams in the fourth round of the 2022 NFL Draft.

== Early life ==
Born and raised in Lamar, South Carolina, Durant graduated from Lamar High School, where he played football, basketball, baseball, and track & field for the Silver Foxes. As a senior, Durant earned all-state honors after totaling 1,224 yards in total offense (621 rushing, 603 passing) as a quarterback and had 50 tackles and four interceptions a safety on defense as he led the Silver Foxes to an 11–3 record and the Class A Division II State football championship.

== College career ==
Despite his personal and team accomplishments, Durant did not receive any offers out of high school. He worked at FedEx and spent a year at Palmetto Prep Academy in Columbia, South Carolina before becoming a walk-on at South Carolina State in 2018. The following year, he had progressed into the starting lineup and was named second team All-MEAC. As a senior in 2021, Durant was a first-team Associated Press FCS All-American selection, first team All-MEAC and was named Defensive MVP of the Cricket Celebration Bowl where he helped the then 6–5 Bulldogs score a 31–10 upset over 11–1 Jackson State. Durant finished his Bulldogs career with 12 interceptions

== Professional career ==
=== Pre-draft ===
Durant improved his draft stock after performing well in the 2022 East–West Shrine Bowl, and was one of only four HBCU players to attend the NFL Scouting Combine. His 4.38s in the 40-yard dash was the fifth-best time amongst all defensive backs. At the conclusion of the pre-draft process, NFL draft scouts and analysts projected Durant would be selected in the fifth or sixth round of the upcoming NFL Draft. The NFL Draft Bible had Durant ranked as the ninth-best inside cornerback in the draft. Michael Renner of Pro Football Focus listed Durant as the 31st-best cornerback prospect (246th overall) on his big board.

External videos
- NFL Combine Workout: Cobie Durant
- Cobie Durant runs a 4.38s 40-yard dash

Pre-draft measurables
Height	Weight	Arm length	Hand span	Wingspan	40-yard dash	10-yard split	20-yard split	20-yard shuttle	Three-cone drill	Vertical jump	Broad jump	Bench press
5 ft 9 5/8 in (1.77 m)	180 lb (82 kg)	30 3/4 in (0.78 m)	8 3/4 in (0.22 m)	6 ft 0 3/4 in (1.85 m)	4.38 s	1.52 s	2.55 s	4.40 s	7.02 s	36.0 in (0.91 m)	9 ft 9 in (2.97 m)	11 reps
All values from NFL Combine/Pro Day

=== Los Angeles Rams ===
The Los Angeles Rams selected Durant in the fourth round (142nd overall) of the 2022 NFL draft. He was the 20th cornerback drafted and the first of two cornerbacks selected by the Rams in 2022, along with sixth-round pick (212th overall) Derion Kendrick.

External videos
- LA Rams select Cobie Durant No. 142

On June 6, 2022, the Rams signed Durant to a four–year, $4.16 million rookie contract that includes a signing bonus of $504,340.

==== 2022 ====
Throughout training camp, he competed to be the third cornerback on the depth chart and to be the starting nickelback against David Long Jr., Robert Rochell, and Derion Kendrick. Head coach Sean McVay named him a backup and listed him as the fourth cornerback on the depth chart to begin the season, behind starters Jalen Ramsey and Troy Hill, as well as primary backup and starting nickelback David Long Jr.

On September 8, 2022, Durant made his professional regular season debut in the Los Angeles Rams' home opener against the Buffalo Bills, but was limited to 23 snaps on special teams in the 31–10 loss. On September 18, 2022, Durant made two combined tackles (one solo for his first career sack), a pass deflection, and had his first career interception on a pass attempt by Marcus Mariota during a 31–27 victory against the Atlanta Falcons. He entered the game to replace Troy Hill after Hill sustained a groin injury. Prior to his interception, Durant suffered an injury to his hamstring and was subsequently inactive for the next four games (Weeks 3–6). In Week 15, Durant earned his first career start at nickelback and recorded four combined tackles (two solo) and made one pass deflection as the Rams lost 12–24 at the Green Bay Packers. On December 25, 2022, Durant made one solo tackle, set season highs with two pass deflections and two interceptions, returning one 85 yards for his first career touchdown during a 51–14 rout of the Denver Broncos. The following week, he set a season-high with seven combined tackles (six solo) as the Rams lost 31–10 versus the Los Angeles Chargers in Week 17. He finished the season with 22 combined tackles (15 solo), five pass deflections, three interceptions, one sack, and one touchdown in 13 games with one start. He received an overall grade of 75.2 from Pro Football Focus as a rookie in 2022.

==== 2023 ====
Durant entered training camp as a candidate for a role of starting cornerback following the departures of Jalen Ramsey and Troy Hill. He competed against Derion Kendrick, Ahkello Witherspoon, Tre'Vius Hodges-Tomlinson, and Robert Rochell under defensive coordinator Raheem Morris. Head coach Sean McVay named Durant the starting nickelback and listed him as the third cornerback on the depth chart to begin the season, behind starters Witherspoon and Kendrick.

In Week 3, Durant earned his first start of the season at nickelback and set a season-high with six solo tackles and made one pass deflection during a 16–19 loss at the Cincinnati Bengals. In Week 6, Durant made four combined tackles (two solo) and had a season high two pass deflections as the Rams defeated the Arizona Cardinals 26–9. He was inactive for the Rams' 17–16 win against the Seattle Seahawks in Week 11 due to a shoulder injury. He finished the season with 39 combined tackles (23 solo) and six pass deflections in 16 games with nine starts. He received an overall grade of 56.9 from Pro Football Focus in 2023.

The Los Angeles Rams finished the 2023 NFL season second in the NFC West with a 10–7 record to earn a playoff berth. On January 14, 2024, Durant started in his first career playoff game and made four combined tackles (three solo) during a 23–24 loss at the Detroit Lions in an NFC Wild Card Game.

==== 2024 ====
During the offseason, the Rams promoted Chris Shula to defensive coordinator after Raheem Morris accepted the head coaching position with the Atlanta Falcons. The Rams signed Tre'Davious White, but he was unable to physically participate in training camp as he recovered from a torn Achilles tendon. This coincided with the departure of Witherspoon, a torn ACL to Kendrick, and Darious Williams being limited by an injured hamstring. Head coach Sean McVay subsequently named Durant the No. 2 starting cornerback to begin the season and paired him with White.

On October 20, 2024, Durant made two solo tackles, two pass deflections, one sack, a forced fumble, and made his lone interception of the season after picking off a pass by Gardner Minshew to tight end Brock Bowers during a 20–15 win against visiting Las Vegas. His Week 7 performance against the Raiders earned Durant NFC Defensive Player of the Week honors. In Week 13, he had a season high six solo tackles (five solo) as the Rams won 21–14 at New Orleans. He was inactive for two games (Weeks 15–16) due to a chest injury. He finished his season with 40 combined tackles (28 solo), eight pass deflections, one sack, a forced fumble, and one interception in 15 games and 15 starts. He received an overall grade of 63.7 from Pro Football Focus, which ranked 95th among 222 qualifying cornerbacks in 2024.

The Los Angeles Rams finished the 2024 NFL season atop the NFC West with a 10–7 record. On January 13, 2025, Durant made two combined tackles (one solo), one pass deflection, one sack, and intercepted a pass thrown by Sam Darnold to wide receiver Jordan Addison as the Rams defeated the Minnesota Vikings 27–9 in an NFC Wild Card Game. The following week, he was limited to one solo tackle and one pass deflection in the Divisional Round as the Rams lost 22–28 at the Philadelphia Eagles who went on to win Super Bowl LIX.

==== 2025 ====
Prior to the start of the season, Durant was honored as the 2025 recipient of the Black College Football Pro Player of the Year Award. In the Rams' season opener against Houston, Durant had two tackles and an interception as L.A. held off the Texans 14–9. Beginning in Week 3, Durant replaced the injured Ahkello Witherspoon in the starting lineup, and remained there for the rest of the season. He had a season-high six tackles in a 26–23 overtime loss to San Francisco in Week 5, then had five tackles and a pass deflection as Los Angeles beat the 49ers 42–26 in the Week 10 rematch. A week later, Durant had one of four interceptions by the defense as the Rams defeated Seattle. In Week 12 against Tampa Bay, Durant came up with a huge play late in the first quarter, when Buccaneers tight end Cade Otton juggled a pass from quarterback Baker Mayfield. Coming up to make a tackle attempt, Durant instead wrestled the ball away from Otton and returned the interception 50 yards for a touchdown and a 14–0 lead on the way to a 34–7 rout. Rematching against the Seahawks in Week 16, Durant made the first fumble recovery of his NFL career late in the second quarter of the Rams' 38–37 overtime loss. For the regular season, Durant played in all 17 games with a single season career-high 15 starts and matched his career single season bests with 40 total tackles and three interceptions.

Durant started all three games of the Rams' postseason run. In an NFC Wild Card Game, he had two pass deflections along with a first quarter inteception of quarterback Bryce Young that ultimately led to a touchdown in L.A.'s 34–31 win at the Carolina Panthers. At Chicago in the Divisional Round, Durant intercepted a Caleb Williams pass in front of the goal line on the Bears' opening possession to thwart their scoring attempt, with the turnover ultimately being converted into a touchdown by the Rams. Midway through the third quarter, he added a second interception at midfield as L.A. went on to defeat Chicago in overtime 20–17 to advance to the NFC Championship Game. Durant had five tackles and two pass deflections, but the Rams were defeated 31–27 by the host Seahawks, who went on to win Super Bowl LX.

=== Dallas Cowboys ===
On March 13, 2026, Durant signed a one-year, $4 million contract with the Dallas Cowboys.

== NFL career statistics ==
Legend
	Led the league
**Bold**	Career high

=== Regular season ===
Year	Team	Games		Tackles					Interceptions						Fumbles				
Year	Team	GP	GS	Cmb	Solo	Ast	Sck	TFL	Int	Yds	Avg	Lng	TD	PD	FF	Fum	FR	Yds	TD
2022	LAR	13	1	22	15	7	**1.0**	1	**3**	**151**	**50.3**	**85**	**1**	5	0	0	0	0	0
2023	LAR	16	9	39	23	**16**	0.0	0	0	0	0.0	0	0	6	0	0	0	0	0
2024	LAR	15	14	**40**	28	12	**1.0**	**4**	1	0	0.0	0	0	**8**	**1**	0	0	0	0
2025	LAR	**17**	**15**	**40**	**30**	10	0.0	1	**3**	60	20.0	50	**1**	7	0	0	**1**	0	0
2026	DAL	6	3	16	10	6	0.0	0	0	0	0.0	0	0	2	1	0	0	0	0
Career		67	42	157	106	51	2.0	6	7	211	30.1	85	2	28	2	0	1	0	0

=== Postseason ===
Year	Team	Games		Tackles					Interceptions						Fumbles				
Year	Team	GP	GS	Cmb	Solo	Ast	Sck	TFL	Int	Yds	Avg	Lng	TD	PD	FF	Fum	FR	Yds	TD
2023	LAR	1	1	4	3	1	0.0	0	0	0	0.0	0	0	0	0	0	0	0	0
2024	LAR	2	0	3	2	1	**1.0**	**1**	1	0	0.0	0	0	2	0	0	0	0	0
2025	LAR	**3**	**3**	**8**	**6**	**2**	0.0	0	**3**	**25**	**8.3**	**14**	0	**7**	0	0	0	0	0
Career		6	4	15	11	4	1.0	1	4	25	6.3	14	0	9	0	0	0	0	0
