= B. J. Goodson =

American football player (born 1993)

B.J. Goodson
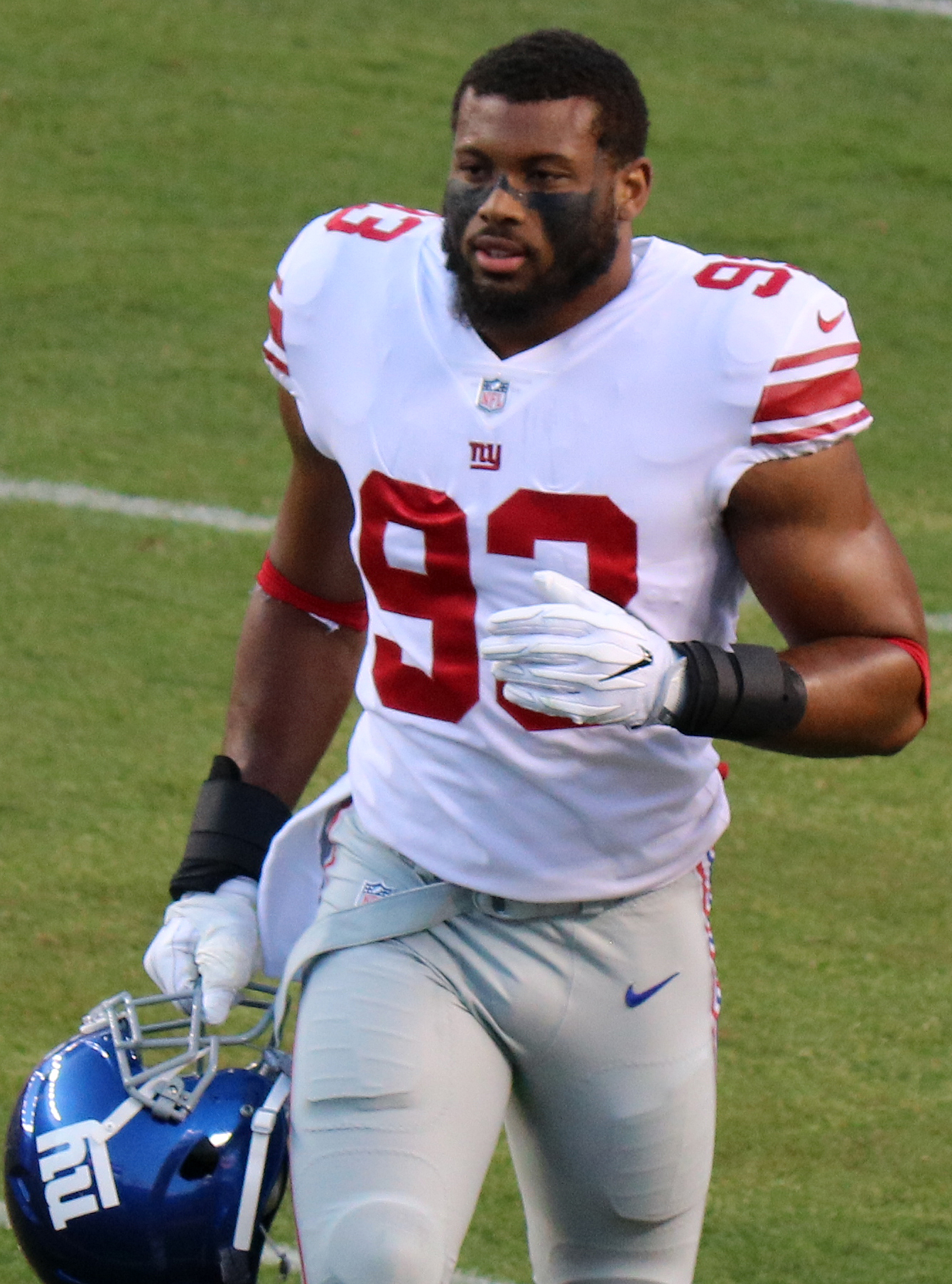
- Goodson with the New York Giants in 2017

No. 93, 48
- Position: Linebacker

Personal information
- Born: May 29, 1993 (age 33); Lamar, South Carolina, U.S.
- Listed height: 6 ft 1 in (1.85 m)
- Listed weight: 242 lb (110 kg)

Career information
- High school: Lamar
- College: Clemson
- NFL draft: 2016: 4th round, 109th overall pick

Career history
- New York Giants (2016–2018); Green Bay Packers (2019); Cleveland Browns (2020); New York Jets (2021)

Awards and highlights
- Second-team All-ACC (2015)

Career NFL statistics
- Total tackles: 251
- Sacks: 1
- Forced fumbles: 2
- Fumble recoveries: 2
- Pass deflections: 12
- Interceptions: 4
- Stats at Pro Football Reference

B.J. Goodson (born May 29, 1993) is an American former professional football player who was a linebacker in the National Football League (NFL). He played college football for the Clemson Tigers and was selected by the New York Giants in the fourth round of the 2016 NFL draft.

== Early life ==
A native of Lamar, South Carolina, Goodson attended Lamar High School where he played linebacker, tight end, and kick returner. An All-State selection in his junior year, Goodson was credited with 96 tackles and six tackles for loss and added 16 receptions for 220 yards and two touchdowns on offense. Lamar finished the 2009 season with a 12–2 record as the SCHSL Class A runner-up, losing 36–6 to Steve Taneyhill's Chesterfield in the state championship game. In his senior year, Goodson recorded 156 tackles on the season and was invited to the North-South All-Star Game in Myrtle Beach, South Carolina.

Regarded as a three-star recruit by ESPN, Goodson was ranked as the No. 29 outside linebacker prospect in the class of 2011. He verbally committed to Clemson on the eve of his senior season, over scholarship offers from Tennessee and Louisiana State, among others.

== College career ==
After redshirting his initial year at Clemson University, Goodson steadily progressed from a backup linebacker and valuable special teams player to starting linebacker and leading tackler of the Tigers defense. Appearing in 47 career games with 21 starts, he was credited with 205 tackles, 17.5 tackles for loss, 6.5 sacks, 21 quarterback pressures, five pass breakups and five recovered fumbles.

== Professional career ==
External videos
- B.J. Goodson's NFL Combine Workout

Pre-draft measurables
Height	Weight	Arm length	Hand span	40-yard dash	10-yard split	20-yard split	20-yard shuttle	Three-cone drill	Vertical jump	Broad jump	Bench press
6 ft 0 5/8 in (1.84 m)	242 lb (110 kg)	33 1/4 in (0.84 m)	10 in (0.25 m)	4.69 s	1.60 s	2.71 s	4.51 s	7.05 s	34.5 in (0.88 m)	9 ft 10 in (3.00 m)	30 reps
All values from NFL Combine

=== New York Giants ===
==== 2016 ====
The New York Giants selected Goodson in the fourth round (109th overall) of the 2016 NFL draft. He was the 15th linebacker drafted in 2016. On June 19, 2016, the Giants signed Goodson to a four-year, $2.92 million contract that includes a signing bonus of $582,207.

External videos
- Giants draft B.J. Goodson 109th overall

Throughout training camp, Goodson competed against Keenan Robinson and Jasper Brinkley to be the starting middle linebacker after it was left vacant due to the retirement of Jon Beason. Head coach Ben McAdoo named Goodson the backup middle linebacker to start the regular season, behind starting middle linebacker Kelvin Sheppard.

Goodson was inactive for the Giants' season-opening 20–19 victory at the Dallas Cowboys. On September 18, 2016, Goodson made his professional regular season debut in the Giants' 16–13 victory against the New Orleans Saints in Week 2. On December 18, 2016, Goodson collected a season-high four combined tackles and forced a fumble during a 17–6 victory against the Detroit Lions in Week 15. He finished his rookie season in 2016 with nine combined tackles (five solo) and one forced fumble in 15 games and zero starts. Goodson primarily played special teams and was limited to 14 snaps on defense.

==== 2017 ====
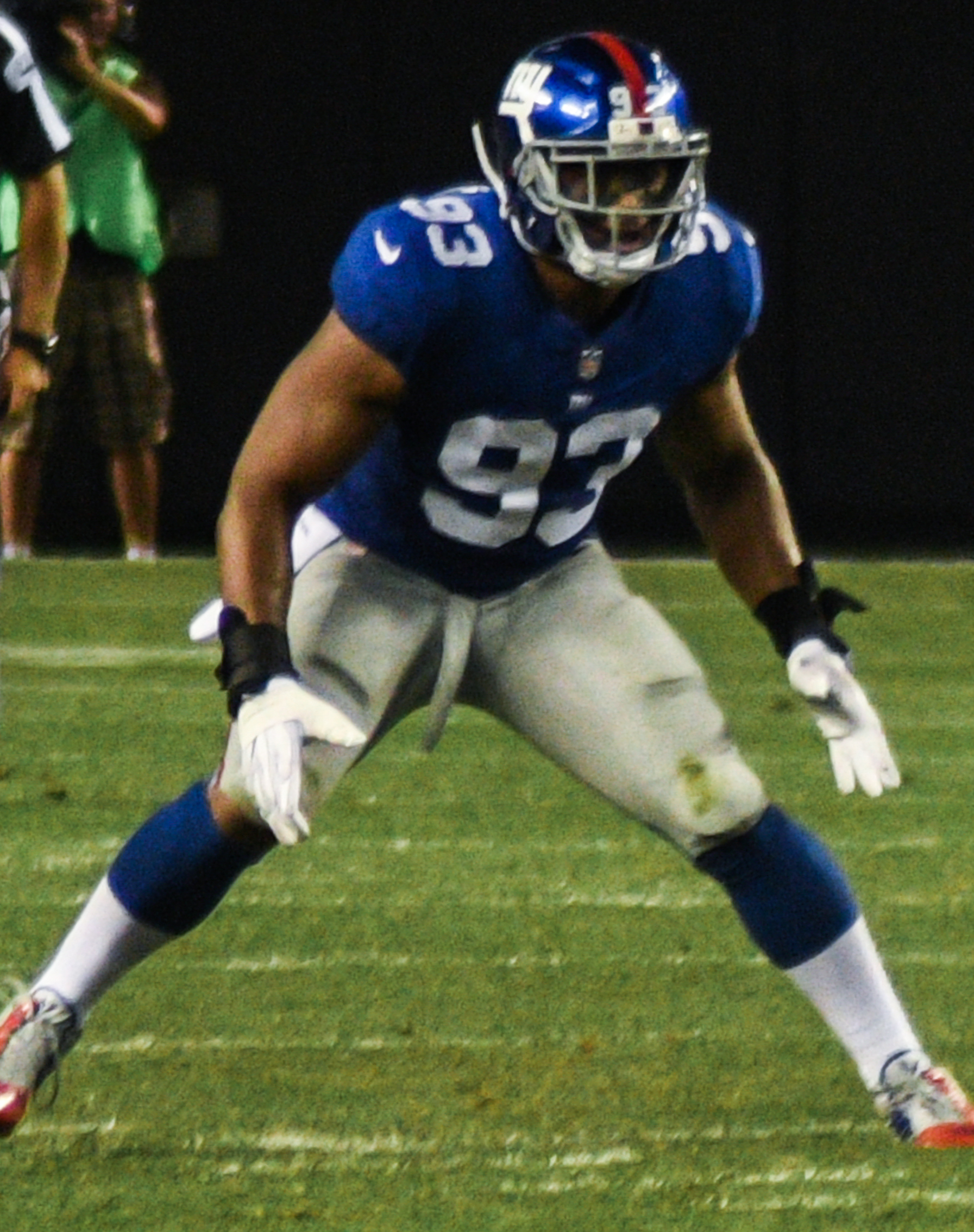
Goodson with the Giants in 2017

Goodson entered training camp slated as the starting middle linebacker. Defensive coordinator Steve Spagnuolo held a competition between Goodson, Keenan Robinson, and Mark Herzlich during training camp. McAdoo named Goodson the starting middle linebacker to begin the regular season. He started alongside outside linebackers Devon Kennard and Jonathan Casillas.

He made his first career start in the Giants' season-opener at the Cowboys and recorded a career-high 18 combined tackles (14 solo) during a 19–3 loss. Goodson was sidelined for the next two games (Weeks 3–4) due to a shin injury. In Week 6, he recorded six combined tackles and made a season-high two pass deflections in the Giants' 23–10 victory at the Denver Broncos. He was inactive for four consecutive games (Week 9–12) and the Giants' 30–10 loss against the Cowboys in Week 14 after injuring his ankle. On December 4, 2017, the Giants fired McAdoo after the team fell to a 2–10 record. Spagnuolo was named the interim head coach for the last four games of the season. Goodson was also inactive for a Week 16 loss at the Arizona Cardinals and was subsequently placed on injured reserve on December 27, 2017. He finished the season with 53 combined tackles (37 solo), two pass deflections, and one forced fumble in seven games and seven starts.

==== 2018 ====
On January 22, 2018, the Giants announced their decision to hire Minnesota Vikings offensive coordinator Pat Shurmur as their new head coach. Shumur hired James Bettcher as defensive coordinator and changed the base 4-3 defense into a base 3-4 defense. Goodson became a starting inside linebacker as a result of the change. Head coach Pat Shurmur named Goodson and Alec Ogletree the starting inside linebackers to begin the regular season. They started alongside outside linebackers Olivier Vernon and Kareem Martin.

External videos
- B.J. Goodson intercepts deflected pass by Mullens

He started in the Giants' season-opener against the Jacksonville Jaguars and made three combined tackles and was credited with half a sack to mark the first of his career during a 20–15 loss. Goodson made his first career sack on Jaguars' quarterback Blake Bortles for an eight-yard loss during the first quarter with teammate Kerry Wynn. On November 12, 2018, Goodson recorded six combined tackles, deflected two passes, and made two interceptions during a 27–23 victory at the San Francisco 49ers in Week 10. Goodson made his first career interception off a pass by 49ers' quarterback Nick Mullens during the game. The pass was intended for wide receiver Kendrick Bourne and was returned by Goodson for a five-yard gain during the first quarter. Goodson was inactive during the Giants' Week 13 victory against the Chicago Bears due to a neck injury. In Week 15, he collected a season-high nine solo tackles and broke up a pass attempt as the Giants lost 17–0 against the Tennessee Titans. He finished the 2018 NFL season with 61 combined tackles (44 solo), four pass deflections, two interceptions, and was credited with half a sack in 15 games and 13 starts. He received an overall grade of 66.2 from Pro Football Focus, which ranked as the 41st best grade among all linebackers in 2018.

=== Green Bay Packers ===
On September 2, 2019, Goodson was traded to the Green Bay Packers while swapping seventh-round picks.

=== Cleveland Browns ===
On March 20, 2020, Goodson signed a one-year contract with the Cleveland Browns. In Week 3 against the Washington Football Team, Goodson recorded his first interception and fumble recovery as a Brown during the 30–24 win. He was placed on the reserve/COVID-19 list by the Browns on December 26, 2020, and activated on January 6, 2021.

Goodson became an unrestricted free agent following the 2020 season.

=== New York Jets ===
On September 14, 2021, Goodson signed a one-year-contract with the New York Jets. On September 22, 2021, Goodson was placed on the reserve/retired list.

== NFL career statistics ==
Regular season statistics
Year	Team	Games		Tackles					Interceptions						Fumbles	
Year	Team	GP	GS	Cmb	Solo	Ast	Sck	Sfty	PD	Int	Yds	Avg	Lng	TD	FF	FR
2016	NYG	15	0	9	5	4	0.0	0	0	0	0	0.0	0	0	1	0
2017	NYG	7	7	53	37	16	0.0	0	2	0	0	0.0	0	0	1	0
2018	NYG	15	13	61	44	17	0.5	0	4	2	8	4.0	5	0	0	1
2019	GB	15	9	37	23	14	0.0	0	0	0	0	0.0	0	0	0	0
2020	CLE	14	14	91	59	32	0.5	0	6	2	7	3.5	7	0	0	1
Total		66	43	251	168	83	1.0	0	12	4	15	3.8	7	0	2	2
Source: NFL.com

Postseason statistics
Year	Team	Games		Tackles					Interceptions						Fumbles	
Year	Team	GP	GS	Cmb	Solo	Ast	Sck	Sfty	PD	Int	Yds	Avg	Lng	TD	FF	FR
2016	NYG	1	0	1	1	0	0.0	0	0	0	0	0.0	0	0	1	0
2019	GB	2	1	6	5	1	0.0	0	0	0	0	0.0	0	0	0	0
Total		3	1	7	6	1	0.0	0	0	0	0	0.0	0	0	0	0
Source: pro-football-reference.com
