= John Abraham (American football) =

American football player (born 1978)

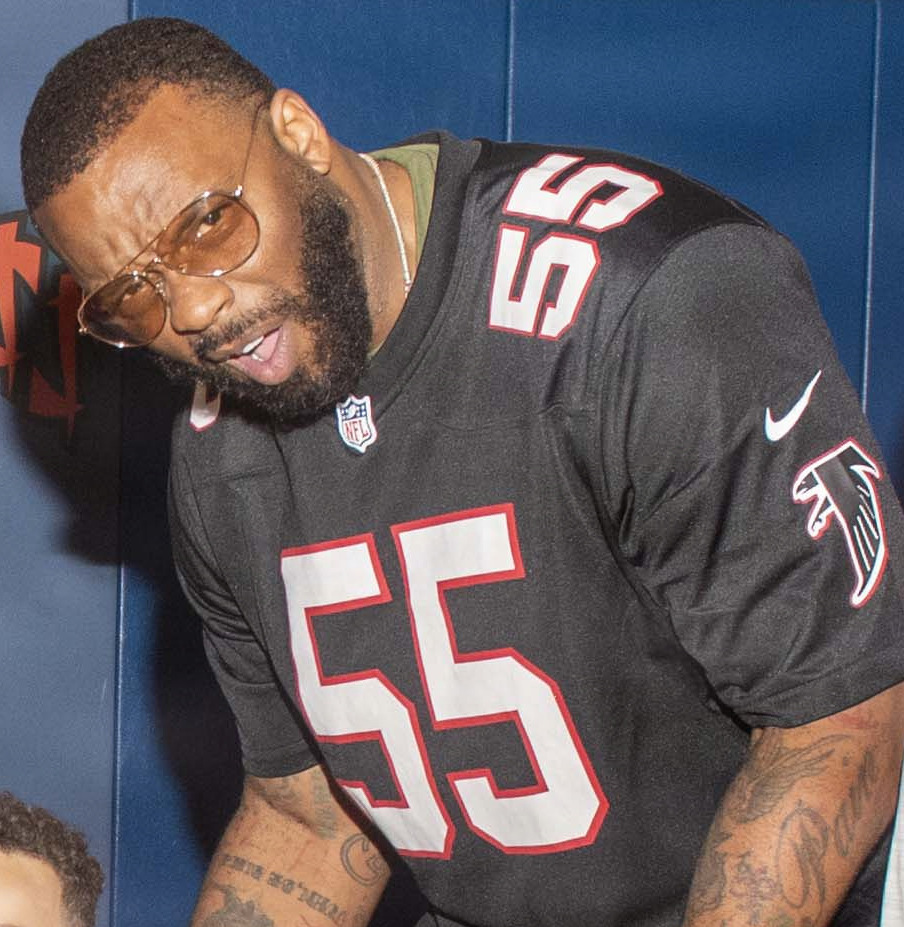
- Abraham in 2026

No. 94, 56, 55
- Positions: Defensive end, linebacker

Personal information
- Born: May 6, 1978 (age 48); Timmonsville, South Carolina, U.S.
- Listed height: 6 ft 4 in (1.93 m)
- Listed weight: 263 lb (119 kg)

Career information
- High school: Lamar (Lamar, South Carolina)
- College: South Carolina (1996–1999)
- NFL draft: 2000: 1st round, 13th overall pick

Career history
- New York Jets (2000–2005); Atlanta Falcons (2006–2012); Arizona Cardinals (2013–2014)

Awards and highlights
- 3× First-team All-Pro (2001, 2008, 2010); 5× Pro Bowl (2001, 2002, 2004, 2010, 2013); NFL forced fumbles co-leader (2001); New York Jets All-Time Four Decade Team; Atlanta Falcons Ring of Honor; Second-team All-SEC (1999)

Career NFL statistics
- Total tackles: 560
- Sacks: 133.5
- Forced fumbles: 48
- Fumble recoveries: 6
- Interceptions: 1
- Defensive touchdowns: 1
- Stats at Pro Football Reference

John Antonio Nettles-Abraham (born May 6, 1978) is an American former professional football player who was a defensive end and linebacker for 15 seasons in the National Football League (NFL). He played college football for the South Carolina Gamecocks, and was selected by the New York Jets in the first round of the 2000 NFL draft. Abraham also played for the Atlanta Falcons and Arizona Cardinals. A three-time first-team All-Pro and five-time selection for the Pro Bowl, Abraham is often regarded as one of the greatest defensive ends of the 2000s, and universally cited as one of the greatest defensive linemen in the history of the New York Jets.

== Early life ==
Abraham was born in Timmonsville, South Carolina. For most of his youth, he was called Tony; he didn't know his first name was John until one of his teachers at Lamar High School in Lamar, South Carolina started calling him John because there was another Tony in his class. At Lamar High, he made a name for himself in track, where he set the current South Carolina record for the 200-meter dash, at 22.6 seconds, and ran the 100-meter dash in 11.26 seconds. He also competed in the throwing events, recording top-throws of 13.61 meters in the shot put and 43.05 meters in the discus. He also played basketball.

== College career ==
Abraham's mother was reluctant to let him play organized football, only relenting in his senior year. Despite this, he showed enough promise that he was recruited by both Clemson and South Carolina. He ultimately chose to play for South Carolina under head coach Brad Scott. While he was a Gamecock, he amassed 23.5 quarterback sacks, ranking second on South Carolina's career list, and was a second-team All-Southeastern Conference (SEC) selection. He rose to prominence even as the Gamecocks were one of the worst teams in college football during his junior and senior years; they went 1-10 in 1998 and 0-11 in 1999.

== Professional career ==
Pre-draft measurables
Height	Weight
6 ft 3 5/8 in (1.92 m)	252 lb (114 kg)
All values from NFL Combine

=== New York Jets ===
Abraham was selected by the New York Jets in the first round (13th overall, via pick acquired from the Tampa Bay Buccaneers in exchange for Keyshawn Johnson) of the 2000 NFL draft. General manager Bill Parcells believed Abraham reminded him of Lawrence Taylor, and urged him to push himself in the same way he had pushed Taylor two decades earlier.

Abraham made an immediate impact in his rookie season, recording 12 tackles and 4.5 sacks in only six games before a torn groin ended his season. In 2001, he recorded 58 tackles and 13 sacks, and was named to the AFC Pro Bowl. In 2002, he recorded 48 tackles, with 10 sacks, and was again named to the Pro Bowl. In 2003, he only recorded 37 tackles and six sacks in six games before his season ended with another groin injury.

Abraham tied a franchise record set by Joe Klecko and Mark Gastineau with four sacks in a game on November 4, 2001, against the New Orleans Saints. Abraham was designated with the franchise tag by the Jets on February 21, 2006.

=== Atlanta Falcons ===
Wanting a trade after the 2005 season despite being franchised by the Jets, Abraham was heavily courted by the Seattle Seahawks and Atlanta Falcons. He chose the Falcons, since Atlanta was closer to his hometown. The Jets received Atlanta's 2006 NFL draft first round pick (No. 29), which was acquired from the Denver Broncos, in return for Abraham. His first season in Atlanta ended after eight games due to groin issues and a broken thumb.

In 2008, he had a career high 16.5 sacks through the entire season and ranked third in the league that year.

On December 12, 2010, Abraham recorded two sacks against the Carolina Panthers. The two sacks gave him 100.5 for his career, making him only the 25th player in NFL history to eclipse 100. On December 27, on Monday Night Football against the New Orleans Saints, Abraham recorded his first career interception after deflecting and catching a Drew Brees pass attempt.

In December 2010, Abraham was selected to his fourth Pro Bowl. He was ranked 69th by his fellow players on the NFL Top 100 Players of 2011.

On June 21, 2012, Abraham signed a 3-year $16.72 million contract to remain in Atlanta.

On March 1, 2013, Abraham was released by the Atlanta Falcons. Although he had just added 10 sacks to his franchise record, the Falcons had lost patience with him. He was frequently late to team events and fell asleep at meetings.

=== Arizona Cardinals ===
After his release, Abraham drew interest from several teams, but later admitted he "self-sabotaged" himself by being late and having a bad attitude. He had long wanted to play for the New England Patriots, but they lost interest after he showed up for a workout 20 pounds under his normal playing weight. He ultimately signed with the Arizona Cardinals on July 25, 2013. In his first season in Arizona, he recorded 11.5 sacks, which ranked seventh in the NFL, and 4 forced fumbles. After a productive first season with the Cardinals, Abraham left Arizona's week one Monday Night Football game on September 8, 2014, after his head collided with the hip of San Diego Chargers tackle D. J. Fluker. Although the impact didn't look severe at first, doctors discovered his brain was bleeding on both sides. A day later, he spoke with Bruce Arians for several hours discussing if he should retire. At the time, he had been suffering memory loss for over a year. He ultimately took a leave of absence from which he never returned; the Cardinals placed him on injured reserve on September 19, effectively ending his career.

== NFL career statistics ==
Legend
**Bold**	Career high

Year	Team	GP	Tackles					Fumbles			Interceptions					
Year	Team	GP	Cmb	Solo	Ast	TfL	Sck	FF	FR	Yds	Int	Yds	Avg	Lng	TD	PD
2000	NYJ	6	15	11	4	3	4.5	2	0	0	0	0	0.0	0	0	0
2001	NYJ	16	**67**	**57**	10	14	13.0	**6**	**3**	**7**	0	0	0.0	0	0	0
2002	NYJ	16	62	49	13	11	10.0	1	0	0	0	0	0.0	0	0	2
2003	NYJ	7	32	24	8	8	6.0	1	0	0	0	0	0.0	0	0	0
2004	NYJ	12	49	35	**14**	13	9.5	3	1	0	0	0	0.0	0	0	2
2005	NYJ	16	58	44	**14**	6	10.5	6	1	0	0	0	0.0	0	0	2
2006	ATL	8	24	21	3	3	4.0	4	0	0	0	0	0.0	0	0	1
2007	ATL	16	32	31	1	10	10.0	4	0	0	0	0	0.0	0	0	4
2008	ATL	16	38	37	1	**20**	**16.5**	4	0	0	0	0	0.0	0	0	1
2009	ATL	16	35	30	5	6	5.5	1	0	0	0	0	0.0	0	0	1
2010	ATL	15	41	36	5	18	13.0	2	0	0	**1**	**6**	**6.0**	**6**	0	4
2011	ATL	15	35	25	10	10	9.5	4	1	0	0	0	0.0	0	0	2
2012	ATL	16	35	32	3	12	10.0	**6**	0	0	0	0	0.0	0	0	**8**
2013	ARI	16	37	31	6	14	11.5	4	0	0	0	0	0.0	0	0	3
2014	ARI	1	0	0	0	0	0.0	0	0	0	0	0	0.0	0	0	0
Career		192	560	463	97	148	133.5	48	6	7	1	6	6.0	6	0	30

== Awards and honors ==
=== NFL ===
- 3× First-team All-Pro (2001, 2008, 2010)
- 5× Pro Bowl (2001, 2002, 2004, 2010, 2013)
- NFL forced fumbles co-leader (2001)
- 100 sacks club
- Ranked No. 69 in the Top 100 Players of 2011

==== Atlanta Falcons franchise records ====
- Career sacks (68.5)

==== College ====
- Second-team All-SEC (1999)

== Personal life ==
Abraham was raised by his mother, Maggie Lee Abraham. In a 2025 interview with The Athletic, he recalled that Maggie Lee was intentionally cold to him because his father, Curly John "Man" Nettles, was never able to make it on his own. Maggie Ann didn’t want to risk her son becoming a "mama's boy" like his father. Nettles was only in Abraham's life sporadically; at most, Abraham saw him once a year. He also recalled that he drank frequently during his NFL career, only letting up briefly after a 2003 accident on Long Island led the NFL to randomly test him. He believes he suffered multiple concussions during his career, in part because his coaches with the Jets taught him to lead with his helmet. After he was forced to retire, he went into a nine-year spiral of depression and suicidal thoughts, only recovering after multiple stints in rehab.

Abraham has a daughter, Endraya. He enjoys watching basketball in his spare time and his favorite team is the Los Angeles Lakers. He cites running back Walter Payton and wide receiver Jerry Rice as his childhood heroes. He attended the Jets' May 5, 2003 blood drive to benefit hospitals throughout Queens, Nassau and Suffolk counties.
