= Tytus Howard =

American football player (born 1996)

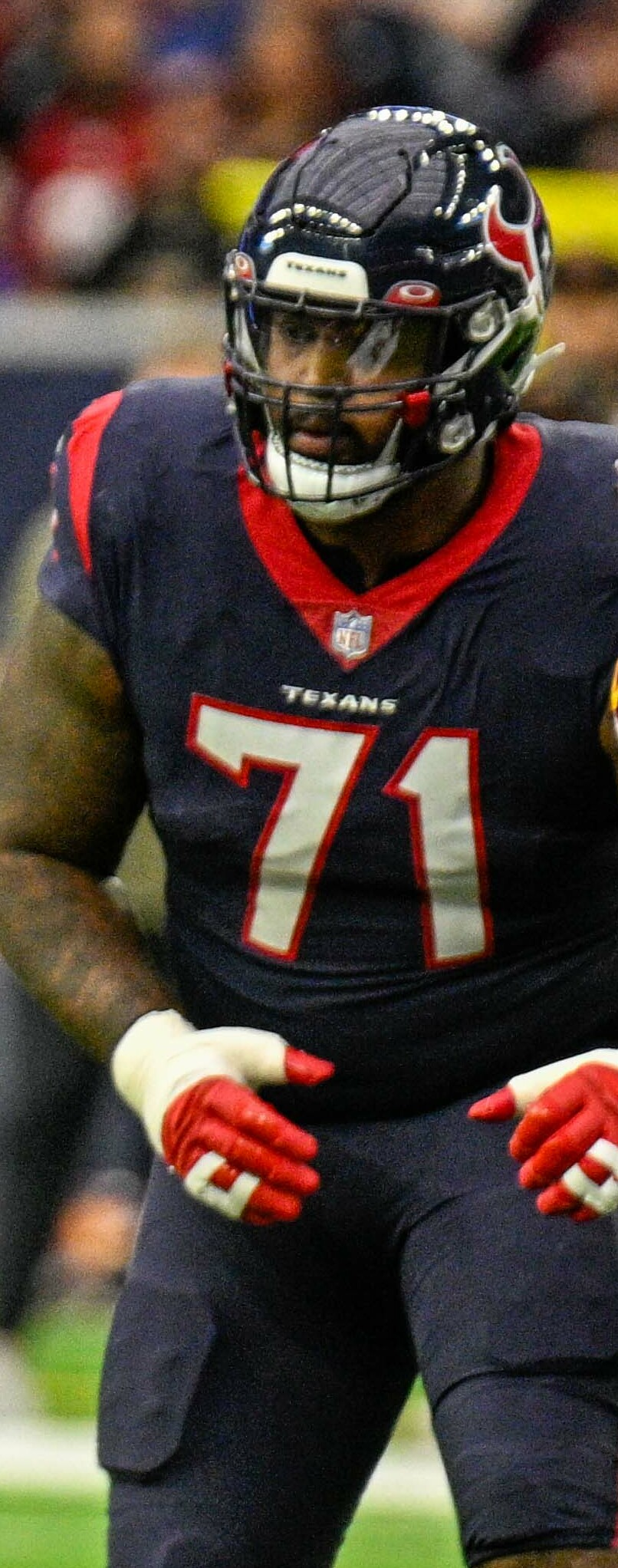
- Howard with the Houston Texans in 2022

No. 71 – Cleveland Browns
- Position: Offensive tackle
- Roster status: Active

Personal information
- Born: May 23, 1996 (age 30); Monroeville, Alabama, U.S.
- Listed height: 6 ft 5 in (1.96 m)
- Listed weight: 320 lb (145 kg)

Career information
- High school: Monroe County (AL)
- College: Alabama State (2014–2018)
- NFL draft: 2019: 1st round, 23rd overall pick

Career history
- Houston Texans (2019–2025); Cleveland Browns (2026–present)

Awards and highlights
- PFWA All-Rookie Team (2019); Black College Football Pro Player of the Year Award (2023); First-team All-SWAC (2018)

Career NFL statistics as of Week 5, 2026
- Games played: 98
- Games started: 98
- Stats at Pro Football Reference

Tytus Howard (born May 23, 1996) is an American professional football offensive tackle for the Cleveland Browns of the National Football League (NFL). He played college football for the Alabama State Hornets.

== Professional career ==
Pre-draft measurables
Height	Weight	Arm length	Hand span	Wingspan	40-yard dash	10-yard split	20-yard split	20-yard shuttle	Three-cone drill	Vertical jump	Broad jump	Bench press
6 ft 5 in (1.96 m)	322 lb (146 kg)	34 in (0.86 m)	10 5/8 in (0.27 m)	6 ft 9 5/8 in (2.07 m)	5.05 s	1.81 s	2.97 s	4.87 s	8.34 s	29.5 in (0.75 m)	8 ft 7 in (2.62 m)	21 reps
All values from NFL Combine

=== Houston Texans ===
Howard was selected by the Houston Texans in the first round (23rd overall) of the 2019 NFL draft. He is the first Alabama State player to be selected in the first round of an NFL draft. He was placed on injured reserve on November 30, 2019. He started eight games as a rookie, seven at right tackle and one at left guard. He was named to the PFWA All-Rookie Team.

In 2020, Howard started the first 14 games at right tackle before being placed on injured reserve on December 23, 2020.

The Texans picked up the fifth-year option on Howard's contract on May 2, 2022.

On July 26, 2023, Howard and the Texans agreed to a three-year, $56 million contract extension.

On September 6, 2023, Howard was placed on injured reserve after suffering a broken hand in practice. He was activated on October 7. He was placed back on injured reserve on November 29 after suffering a season-ending knee injury in Week 12.

=== Cleveland Browns ===
On March 11, 2026, Howard was traded to the Cleveland Browns in exchange for a 2026 fifth-round draft pick (No. 141: Kamari Ramsey), with whom he subsequently agreed to a three-year, $63 million extension running through the 2029 season.
