= Marshall McFadden =

American gridiron football player (born 1986)

No. 40, 54, 51, 36
- Position: Linebacker

Personal information
- Born: August 4, 1986 (age 40); Lamar, South Carolina, U.S.
- Listed height: 6 ft 1 in (1.85 m)
- Listed weight: 233 lb (106 kg)

Career information
- High school: Lamar (Lamar, South Carolina)
- College: South Carolina State
- NFL draft: 2011: undrafted

Career history
- Pittsburgh Steelers (2012); Oakland Raiders (2013); St. Louis Rams (2014); Toronto Argonauts (2016)

Awards and highlights
- Second-team All-MEAC in 2008

Career NFL statistics
- Total tackles: 7
- Stats at Pro Football Reference

Career CFL statistics
- Total tackles: 37
- Stats at CFL.ca

Marshall Maquel McFadden (born August 4, 1986) is a former gridiron football linebacker who last played for the Toronto Argonauts of the Canadian Football League (CFL). He was signed by the Pittsburgh Steelers to a reserve/future contract on January 18, 2012. He played college football at South Carolina State University.

== College career ==
He played linebacker at South Carolina State. He finished the 2007 season with 12 tackles. He finished the 2008 season with 88 tackles, 5 sacks. He earned MEAC Defensive Player of the Week honors during the 2008 season.

== Professional career ==
=== Pittsburgh Steelers ===
On January 18, 2012, he signed with the Pittsburgh Steelers to a reserve/future contract. On August 31, 2012, he was released on the day of roster cuts. On September 1, 2012, he was signed to the practice squad. On November 15, 2012, he was promoted from the practice squad after the team placed linebacker Chris Carter on injured reserve. On November 20, 2012, he was released from the Steelers after they signed wide receiver Plaxico Burress and quarterback Brian Hoyer. On November 21, he was signed to the practice squad.

=== Oakland Raiders ===
On September 2, 2013, he signed with the Oakland Raiders to a practice squad.

=== St. Louis Rams ===
On October 21, 2014, he was moved up to the St. Louis Rams' active roster. On September 5, 2015, he was released by the Rams.

== NASCAR ==
After retiring from pro football, McFadden is a pit crew member for various NASCAR teams, working for Jeremy Clements Racing.

As of 2025, McFadden is now a jackman at Trackhouse Racing for Ross Chastain.
