= Levon Kirkland =

American football player and coach (born 1969)

Clemson Tigers
- Title: Director of sophomore transition & player development

Personal information
- Born: February 17, 1969 (age 57); Lamar, South Carolina, U.S.
- Listed height: 6 ft 1 in (1.85 m)
- Listed weight: 275 lb (125 kg)

Career information
- Position: Linebacker (No. 99, 93)
- High school: Lamar
- College: Clemson
- NFL draft: 1992: 2nd round, 38th overall pick

Career history

Playing
- Pittsburgh Steelers (1992–2000); Seattle Seahawks (2001); Philadelphia Eagles (2002)

Coaching
- Florida A&M (2013–2014) Linebackers coach

Operations
- Clemson (2023–present) Director of sophomore transition & player development

Awards and highlights
- First-team All-Pro (1997); Second-team All-Pro (1996); 2× Pro Bowl (1996, 1997); NFL Alumni Linebacker of the Year (1997); NFL 1990s All-Decade Team; Consensus All-American (1991); Second-team All-American (1990); 2× First-team All-ACC (1990, 1991); Second-team All-ACC (1989)

Career NFL statistics
- Tackles: 1,026
- Sacks: 19.5
- Forced fumbles: 16
- Fumble recoveries: 9
- Interceptions: 11
- Defensive touchdowns: 1
- Stats at Pro Football Reference

Lorenzo Levon Kirkland (born February 17, 1969) is an American former professional football player who was a linebacker for 11 years in the National Football League (NFL), primarily for the Pittsburgh Steelers. A two-time All-Pro and two-time Pro Bowl selection with the Steelers, he was named to the NFL 1990s All-Decade Team.

Kirkland played college football for the Clemson Tigers, earning consensus All-American honors in 1991. Selected by Pittsburgh in the second round of the 1992 NFL draft, he played nine seasons with the Steelers, and one each for the Seattle Seahawks and the Philadelphia Eagles. After his playing career, Kirkland was a linebackers coach for two seasons for the Florida A&M Rattlers.

== Professional career ==
Pre-draft measurables
Height	Weight	Arm length	Hand span	40-yard dash	10-yard split	20-yard split	20-yard shuttle	Vertical jump	Broad jump	Bench press
6 ft 0 3/8 in (1.84 m)	240 lb (109 kg)	32 1/2 in (0.83 m)	8 1/2 in (0.22 m)	4.92 s	1.75 s	2.91 s	4.13 s	32.5 in (0.83 m)	9 ft 8 in (2.95 m)	20 reps
All values from NFL Combine

Kirkland was a massive inside linebacker, just 6'1" but weighing anywhere from 275-300 pounds during his career. Despite his size, he had great speed and agility. He became a starter at inside linebacker for the Steelers in his second season, 1993, replacing Pro Bowler David Little.

On August 14, 1995, the Pittsburgh Steelers signed Kirkland to a four-year, $6 million contract that included a signing bonus of $900,000.

By 1995, he was recognized as one of the top inside linebackers in the league, and had a stellar performance in Super Bowl XXX against the Dallas Cowboys at the end of the season. In that game, the Steelers defense held the Cowboys to just 15 first downs and Emmitt Smith and the Cowboys powerful running attack to just 56 yards, despite losing 27–17 in large part due to two key interceptions thrown by Steelers quarterback Neil O'Donnell. Kirkland had 10 tackles and a key sack of Dallas quarterback Troy Aikman.

That game and his outstanding 1996 season earned Kirkland his first trip to the Pro Bowl and All-Pro honors after the 1996 season. The Steelers had lost their emotional leader, outside linebacker Greg Lloyd, at the start of the season to a knee injury, but Kirkland took over the mantle of leadership. He also took over Lloyd's role in pass coverage as the only linebacker in the Steelers nickel defense. Opponents thought Kirkland would not be as adept in pass coverage as the fast Lloyd, but they quickly found out that Kirkland was just as fast and quick. He had four interceptions that season, a high number for an inside linebacker, to go along with four sacks and 114 tackles.

Kirkland made the Pro Bowl after the 1997 season as well, making a career-high and team-leading 126 tackles and career-high five sacks, as the Steelers went to the AFC Championship game (losing to the Denver Broncos). Although Kirkland played well in the next three seasons (1998–2000), the Steelers struggled on offense, and failed to make the playoffs, and Kirkland did not earn any more Pro Bowl berths despite his strong play.

In a surprise move, the Steelers waived Kirkland just before the 2001 season due to salary cap pressure. That year many star players were waived due to the salary cap including John Randle, Troy Aikman, and Jerry Rice. Kirkland went to the Seattle Seahawks where he became a leader on the defense and had over 100 tackles. The next year, he played his final season for the Eagles, becoming the veteran leader of a defense that ranked seventh in the league and advanced to the NFC Championship game before losing to the Buccaneers.

== NFL career statistics ==
General			Tackles				Fumbles			Interceptions					
Year	Team	GP	Comb	Solo	Ast	Sack	FF	FR	Yds	Int	Yds	Avg	Lng	TD	PD
1993	PIT	16	75	59	16	1.0	4	2	0	0	0	0	0	0	4
1994	PIT	16	101	70	31	3.0	0	0	0	2	0	0	0	0	7
1995	PIT	16	88	58	30	1.0	0	2	0	0	0	0	0	0	1
1996	PIT	16	113	75	38	4.0	2	0	0	4	12	3	6	0	8
1997	PIT	16	125	94	31	5.0	1	1	0	2	14	7	11	0	7
1998	PIT	16	113	75	38	2.5	3	0	0	1	1	1	1	0	15
1999	PIT	16	107	86	21	2.0	4	2	0	1	23	23	23	0	6
2000	PIT	16	86	65	21	0.0	0	1	0	1	1	1	1	0	5
2001	SEA	16	100	79	21	1.0	2	0	0	0	0	0	0	0	3
2002	PHI	16	74	53	21	0.0	0	1	0	0	0	0	0	0	6
Career		160	982	714	268	19.5	16	9	0	11	51	5	23	0	62

== Post-NFL ==
In 1996, Kirkland was named to Clemson University's All-Centennial team and was inducted into the University's Hall of Fame in 2001. After retiring from the NFL, he returned to Clemson and earned his sociology degree in 2004 and worked for Clemson coordinating minority recruitment in admissions for the university. He was inducted into the South Carolina Athletic Hall of Fame in 2008. Kirkland also educates student-athletes across the country on the college recruiting process as an Educational Speaker for the National Collegiate Scouting Association.

After coaching linebackers for Wade Hampton High School in Greenville, South Carolina in 2009, Kirkland worked as the assistant head coach at Woodmont High School in South Carolina until November 2011 when he was named the head coach for Shannon Forest Christian School in Greenville, South Carolina. In March 2013, Kirkland accepted a job coaching linebackers at Florida A&M University.

== Personal life ==
Kirkland's wife, Keisha, with whom he has a daughter, Kennedy, died in October 2013 due to lung cancer. He also has a son named Zach.

Kirkland's cousin, Devon Still, played in the NFL with the Cincinnati Bengals, Houston Texans, and New York Jets. His uncle Lamont Kirkland was a light heavyweight professional boxer.

== See also ==
- Most consecutive starts by an inside linebacker
