= Black College Football Pro Player of the Year Award =

Annual professional football award

Black College Football Pro Football Player of the Year Award
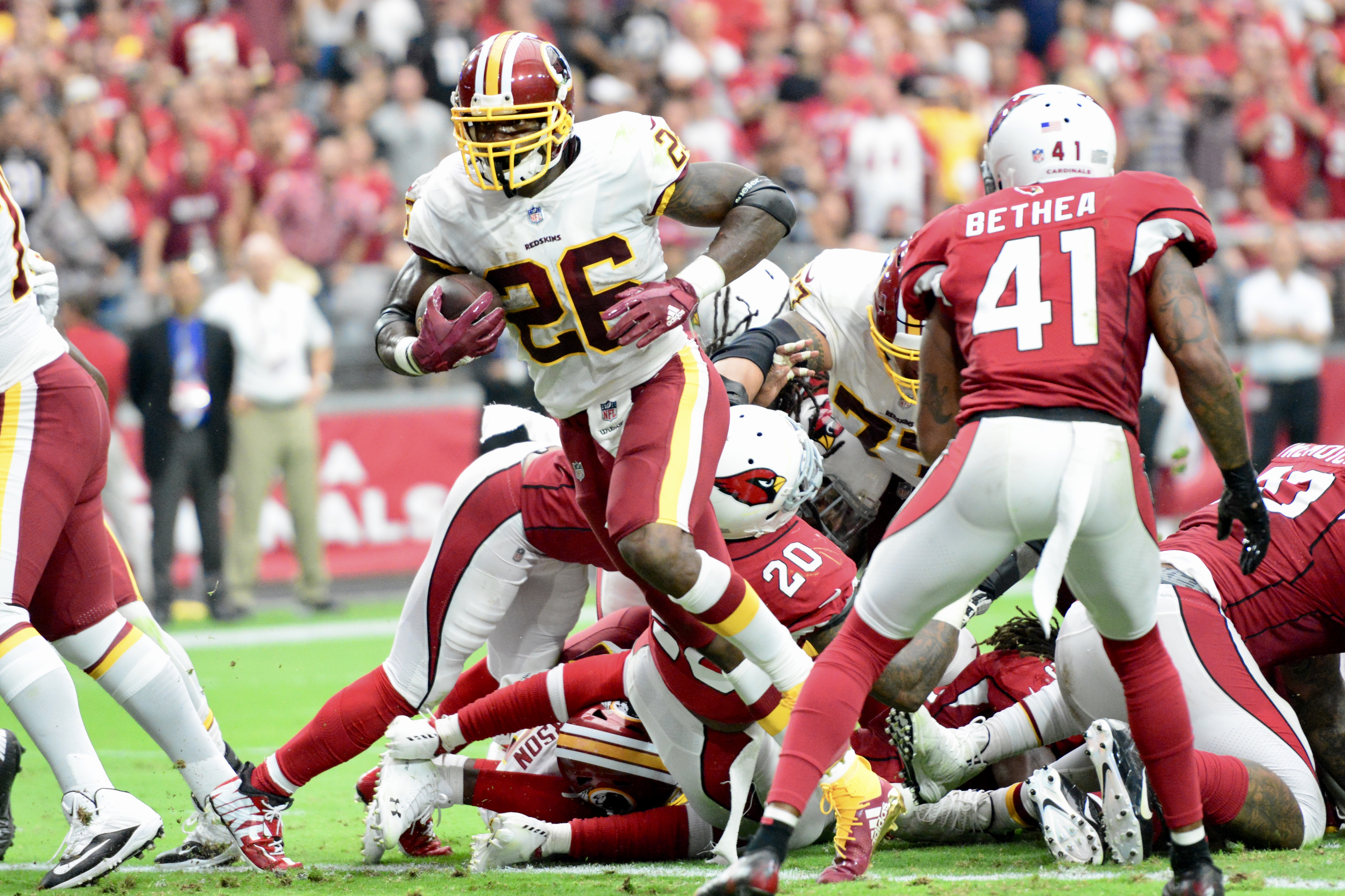
- Inaugural recipient, Antoine Bethea (41), playing in 2018
- Awarded for: Most outstanding professional football player from a Historically Black College and University
- Presented by: Black College Football Hall of Fame and NFLPA

History
- First award: 2018
- Most recent: James Houston IV

The Black College Football Pro Player of the Year is an annual player of the year award given by the NFLPA and Black College Football Hall of Fame to the most outstanding professional football player from a Historically Black College and University (HBCU). Since in was created, the award has been used to recognize one active NFL player who "serves as a positive influence in his community, has ties to his HBCU alma mater, exhibits good character and has performed at a high level during the most recent NFL season". The award is presented annually at the Black College Football Hall of Fame Induction Ceremony

== Winners ==
Year	Player	Position	College	Team	Ref
2018	Antoine Bethea	Safety	Howard	Arizona Cardinals	
2019	Shaquille Leonard	Linebacker	South Carolina State	Indianapolis Colts	
2019	Tarik Cohen	Running back	North Carolina A&T	Chicago Bears	
2020	Javon Hargrave	Defensive tackle	South Carolina State (2)	Pittsburgh Steelers	
2021	Terron Armstead	Offensive tackle	Arkansas–Pine Bluff	New Orleans Saints	
2022	Grover Stewart	Defensive tackle	Albany State	Indianapolis Colts	
2023	Tytus Howard	Offensive tackle	Alabama State	Houston Texans	
2024	Markquese Bell	Safety	Florida A&M	Dallas Cowboys	
2025	Cobie Durant	Cornerback	South Carolina State (3)	Los Angeles Rams	
2026	James Houston IV	Linebacker	Jackson State	Dallas Cowboys	
