= James Houston (American football) =

American football player (born 1998)

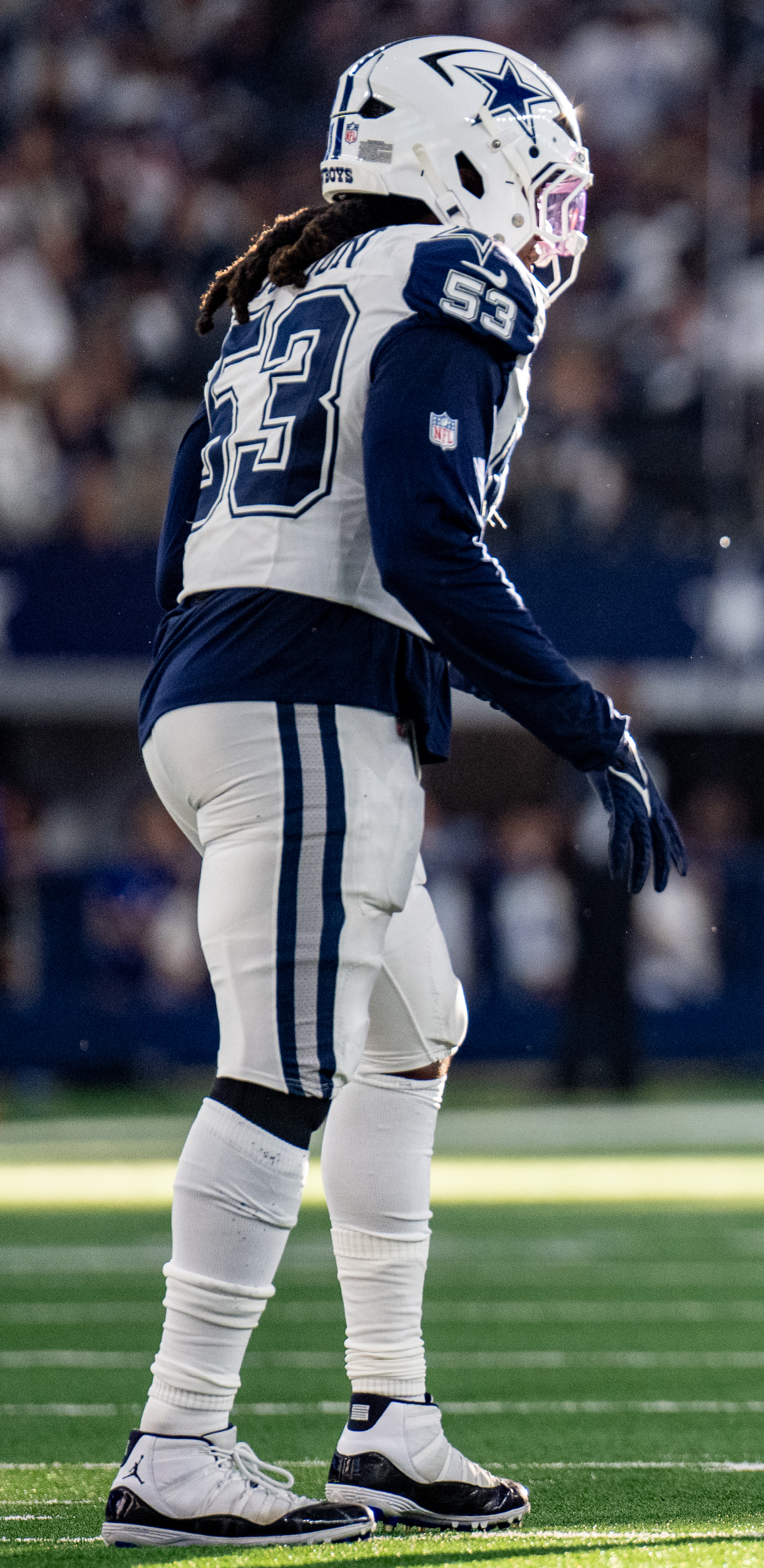
- Houston with the Dallas Cowboys in 2025

No. 41 – Dallas Cowboys
- Position: Outside linebacker
- Roster status: Active

Personal information
- Born: November 16, 1998 (age 28); Fort Lauderdale, Florida, U.S.
- Listed height: 6 ft 1 in (1.85 m)
- Listed weight: 248 lb (112 kg)

Career information
- High school: American Heritage (Plantation, Florida)
- College: Florida (2017–2020); Jackson State (2021)
- NFL draft: 2022: 6th round, 217th overall pick

Career history
- Detroit Lions (2022–2024); Cleveland Browns (2024); Dallas Cowboys (2025–present)

Awards and highlights
- Black College Football Pro Player of the Year (2026); SWAC Newcomer of the Year (2021); First-team All-SWAC (2021)

Career NFL statistics as of Week 10, 2026
- Total tackles: 70
- Sacks: 16.0
- Forced fumbles: 2
- Fumble recoveries: 2
- Stats at Pro Football Reference

James Houston IV (born November 16, 1998) is an American professional football outside linebacker for the Dallas Cowboys of the National Football League (NFL). He played college football for the Florida Gators before transferring to the Jackson State Tigers, and was selected in the sixth round of the 2022 NFL draft by the Detroit Lions.

== Early life ==
Houston grew up in Fort Lauderdale, Florida and attended the American Heritage School. He was rated a three-star recruit and committed to play college football at Florida over offers Wisconsin, South Carolina, Michigan, and Miami.

== College career ==
Houston began his college career at Florida. He redshirted his true freshman season after being suspended along with eight other players due to his involvement in a credit card fraud scheme. As a redshirt freshman, Houston played in all 13 of the Gators' games as a reserve linebacker and made 28 tackles with two tackles for loss, two forced fumbles, and one blocked punt. He had 38 tackles with six tackles for loss and 3.5 sacks in his redshirt sophomore season. Houston recorded 37 tackles, 3.5 tackles for a loss, one sack, and one forced fumble as a redshirt junior. Following the end of the season he entered the NCAA transfer portal.

Houston ultimately transferred to Jackson State. In his only season with the Tigers, he recorded 70 tackles, 24.5 tackles for loss, 16.5 sacks, seven forced fumbles, and an interception and was named first-team All-Southwestern Athletic Conference.

== Professional career ==
Pre-draft measurables
Height	Weight	Arm length	Hand span	Wingspan	40-yard dash	10-yard split	20-yard split	20-yard shuttle	Three-cone drill	Vertical jump	Broad jump	Bench press
6 ft 0 1/4 in (1.84 m)	244 lb (111 kg)	34 1/4 in (0.87 m)	9 in (0.23 m)	6 ft 10 in (2.08 m)	4.74 s	1.56 s	2.62 s	4.48 s	7.41 s	39.0 in (0.99 m)	10 ft 5 in (3.18 m)	22 reps
All values from Pro Day

=== Detroit Lions ===
Houston was selected in the sixth round, 217th overall, by the Detroit Lions in the 2022 NFL draft. On August 30, 2022, he was waived by the Lions and re-signed to the practice squad the following day. He was promoted to the active roster on November 28. During a Thanksgiving Day matchup against the Buffalo Bills, Houston recorded 2 sacks, 2 solo tackles, and a fumble recovery in just five defensive snaps. He followed this up with a sack in each of his next 3 games, becoming only the third player in NFL history (along with Terrell Suggs and Santana Dotson) to open his career with a 4-game sack streak.

On September 19, 2023, Houston was placed on injured reserve after suffering a leg injury in Week 2. On January 18, 2024, the Lions reinstated Houston. On November 26, the Lions released Houston.

=== Cleveland Browns ===
On November 27, 2024, Houston was claimed off waivers by the Cleveland Browns.

=== Dallas Cowboys ===
On July 22, 2025, Houston signed with the Dallas Cowboys.

== NFL career statistics ==
Legend
**Bold**	Career high

Year	Team	Games		Tackles					Interceptions						Fumbles	
Year	Team	GP	GS	Comb	Solo	Ast	Sack	TFL	Int	Yards	Avg	Long	TD	PD	FF	FR
2022	DET	7	**2**	12	11	1	**8.0**	**7**	0	0	0	0	0	0	0	**1**
2023	DET	2	1	1	1	0	1.0	0	0	0	0	0	0	0	0	0
2024	DET	8	0	8	5	4	1.0	1	0	0	0	0	0	0	0	0
2024	CLE	3	0	0	0	0	0.0	0	0	0	0	0	0	0	0	0
2025	DAL	**17**	0	**35**	**18**	**17**	5.5	6	0	0	0	0	0	0	**1**	**1**
2026	DAL	6	0	14	5	9	1.5	1	0	0	0	0	0	0	0	0
Career		43	3	70	40	30	16.0	15	0	0	0	0	0	0	2	2
