= Shaquille Leonard =

American football player (born 1995)

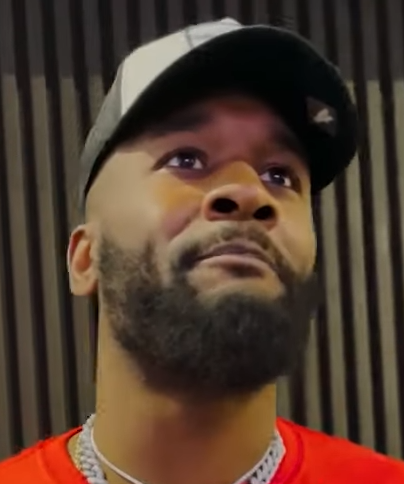
- Leonard in 2022

No. 53
- Position: Linebacker

Personal information
- Born: July 27, 1995 (age 31); Nichols, South Carolina, U.S.
- Listed height: 6 ft 2 in (1.88 m)
- Listed weight: 230 lb (104 kg)

Career information
- High school: Lake View (Lake View, South Carolina)
- College: South Carolina State (2013–2017)
- NFL draft: 2018: 2nd round, 36th overall pick

Career history
- Indianapolis Colts (2018–2023); Philadelphia Eagles (2023)

Awards and highlights
- NFL Defensive Rookie of the Year (2018); 3× First-team All-Pro (2018, 2020, 2021); Second-team All-Pro (2019); 3× Pro Bowl (2019–2021); NFL forced fumbles leader (2021); NFL solo tackles leader (2018); NFL combined tackles leader (2018); PFWA All-Rookie Team (2018); Black College Football Pro Player of the Year Award (2019); 2× MEAC Defensive Player of the Year (2016, 2017); 3× First-team All-MEAC (2015-2017)

Career NFL statistics
- Total tackles: 637
- Sacks: 16
- Forced fumbles: 17
- Fumble recoveries: 7
- Pass deflections: 31
- Interceptions: 12
- Defensive touchdowns: 1
- Stats at Pro Football Reference

Darius Shaquille Leonard (born July 27, 1995) is an American former professional football linebacker who played in the National Football League (NFL) for six seasons. He played college football for the South Carolina State Bulldogs and was selected in the second round of the 2018 NFL draft by the Indianapolis Colts. Leonard also played for the Philadelphia Eagles. As a rookie, he led the league in tackles and was named a first-team All-Pro and Defensive Rookie of the Year while also being voted into the NFL Top 100 the following offseason. Leonard has been informally nicknamed "Maniac" due to his energetic and productive on-field play.

== Early life ==
Leonard attended and played high school football at Lake View High School in Lake View, South Carolina.

== College career ==
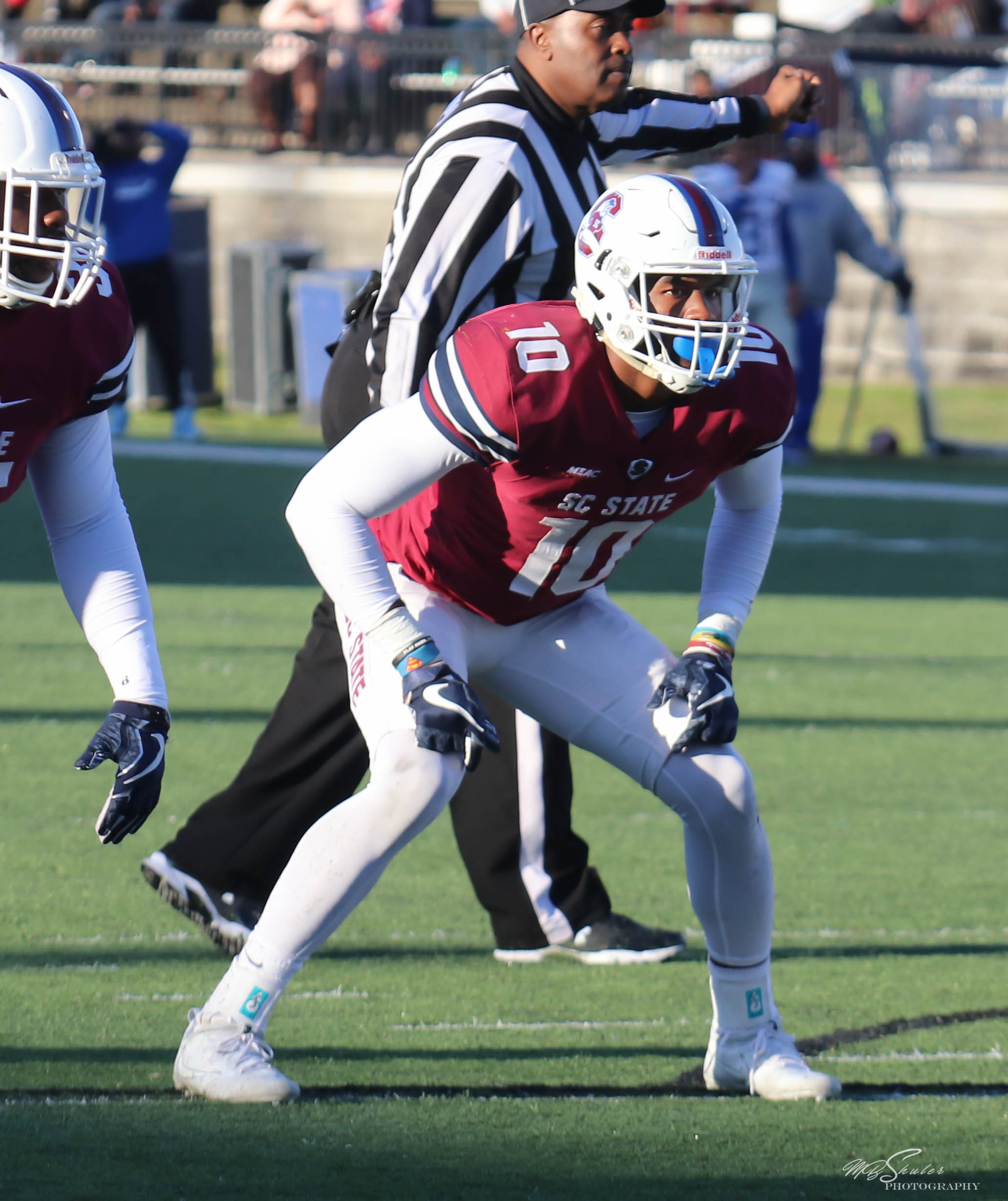
Leonard at South Carolina State in 2017

Leonard led SCSU in tackles as a redshirt freshman in 2014, compiling 86, 14 for loss, five sacks, and two forced fumbles. He posted 70 stops the following year (2015), 13 1/2 of those for loss, with five sacks and two interceptions to earn a first-team all-conference selection as a redshirt sophomore. After the 2016 season, Leonard was named the Mid-Eastern Athletic Conference (MEAC) defensive player of the year, making SC State the first school to win the award four years in a row. Leonard finished the season with 124 tackles, 14 1/2 tackles for loss, 3 1/2 sacks, two interceptions, three pass break-ups, and four forced fumbles. He had an impressive game against Atlantic Coast Conference powerhouse Clemson, totaling 19 tackles. Leonard saved his best for last, as he posted career highs in total tackles (113) and sacks (8 1/2) as a senior while picking off two more passes and forcing one fumble. His 73 solo tackles in 2017 put him in the Top 10 in the nation, and 4 1/2 of his sacks came in his final two games. He also won the MEAC defensive player of the year award again after the 2017 season.

== Professional career ==
=== Pre-draft ===
On November 20, 2017, it was announced that Leonard had accepted his invitation to play in the 2018 Senior Bowl. On January 27, 2018, Leonard played in the 2018 Senior Bowl and recorded a game-high 14 combined tackles (five solo) as part of Bill O'Brien's North team that defeated the South 45–16. Leonard's performance at the Senior Bowl immensely helped his draft stock. Leonard attended the NFL Scouting Combine, but was unable to complete all of his combine drills after injuring his quadriceps while running his 40-yard dash. He completed the bench press, 40-yard dash, 20-yard dash, and 10-yard dash at the NFL Combine. On March 20, 2018, Leonard participated at South Carolina State's pro day and performed the rest of his combine drills. At the conclusion of the pre-draft process, Leonard was projected to be a second or third round pick by NFL draft experts and scouts. He was ranked as the sixth best inside linebacker prospect in the draft by NFL analyst Mel Kiper Jr. and was ranked the seventh best outside linebacker by DraftScout.com.

Pre-draft measurables
Height	Weight	Arm length	Hand span	Wingspan	40-yard dash	10-yard split	20-yard split	20-yard shuttle	Three-cone drill	Vertical jump	Broad jump	Bench press
6 ft 2 in (1.88 m)	234 lb (106 kg)	34 3/8 in (0.87 m)	10 1/4 in (0.26 m)	6 ft 10 1/8 in (2.09 m)	4.70 s	1.63 s	2.77 s	4.63 s	7.37 s	38 in (0.97 m)	10 ft 8 in (3.25 m)	20 reps
All values from NFL Combine/South Carolina State's Pro Day

=== Indianapolis Colts ===
==== 2018 ====
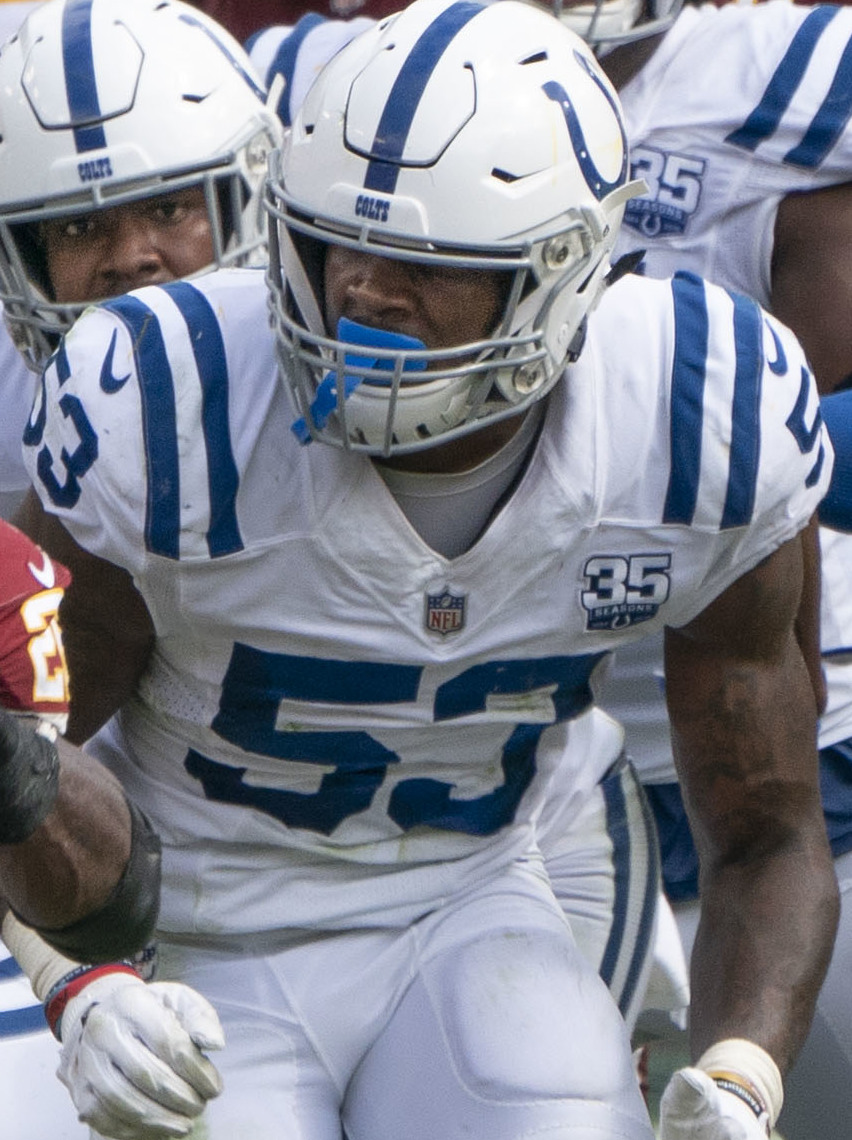
Leonard playing for the Colts in his rookie season.

The Indianapolis Colts selected Leonard in the second round with the 36th overall pick in the 2018 NFL draft. Leonard was the sixth linebacker taken in the draft.

On July 23, 2018, Leonard signed a four-year, $7.24 million contract that included $4.16 million guaranteed and a signing bonus of $3.35 million. Leonard entered training camp slated as the starting weakside linebacker. Head coach Frank Reich named Leonard the starting weakside linebacker to start the regular season in 2018, alongside Najee Goode and middle linebacker Anthony Walker Jr.

External videos
- Leonard swoops in for recovery after blocked FG
- Darius Leonard’s top plays from Week 15
- Blaine Gabbert gifts Leonard his first career INT
- Darius Leonard’s INT ices game for Indy

He made his professional regular season debut and first career start in the Colts' season-opener against the Cincinnati Bengals and recorded nine combined tackles and recovered a fumble in their 34–23 loss. On September 16, 2018, Leonard collected a season-high 19 combined tackles (15 solo) and made his first career sack on Redskins' quarterback Alex Smith during a 21–9 win at the Washington Redskins. For his performance, he was named the American Football Conference (AFC) Defensive Player of the Week. The following week, Leonard recorded 13 combined tackles (nine solo) and made two sacks on Eagles' quarterback Carson Wentz in the Colts' 20–16 loss at the Philadelphia Eagles in Week 3. On October 4, 2018, after totaling 54 combined tackles (which led the league, and was most by a player in first four weeks of the season since 1994) and four sacks (leading all rookies) in September, Leonard was named the NFL Defensive Rookie of the Month. Leonard was inactive for the Colts’ Week 5 loss at the New England Patriots due to an ankle injury he sustained the previous week. On November 18, 2018, Leonard made seven combined tackles, one pass deflection, one sack, and his first career interception during a 38–10 victory against the Tennessee Titans in Week 11. Leonard intercepted a pass by Titans’ backup quarterback Blaine Gabbert, that was intended for wide receiver Tajae Sharpe, and returned it for a ten-yard gain during the third quarter. In Week 15, Leonard broke the Colts' franchise record for most tackles by a rookie in a single season with 143, in a 23–0 win vs the Dallas Cowboys. In Week 17, Leonard broke the Colts’ franchise record for most tackles in a single season with 163, in a 33–17 win vs the Tennessee Titans. For his performance, Leonard was once again awarded with AFC Defensive Player of the Week. Leonard was awarded the AFC Defensive Player of the Month award for December. He finished his rookie season in 2018 with 163 combined tackles (111 solo), eight pass deflections, seven sacks, and two interceptions in 15 games and 15 starts. Leonard led the NFL in solo tackles and combined tackles. He was named to the PFWA All-Rookie Team.

The Colts finished second in the AFC South with a 10–6 record and earned a playoff berth. On January 5, 2019, Leonard started in his first career playoff game and recorded 13 combined tackles (five solo) and broke up a pass attempt during a 21–7 victory at the Houston Texans in the AFC Wild Card Round. In the Divisional Round, a 31–13 loss to the Kansas City Chiefs, he had 14 combined tackles (ten solo), one forced fumble, and one fumble recovery. He was ranked 26th by his fellow players on the NFL Top 100 Players of 2019.

==== 2019 ====
In Week 2 against the Titans, Leonard made 10 tackles and one sack on Marcus Mariota as the Colts won 19–17. After the game, Leonard reportedly felt concussion like symptoms and was forced to miss the next three games. He made his return in Week 7 against the Texans. In the game, Leonard recorded a team high ten tackles and an interception off Deshaun Watson in the 30–23 win. In Week 10 against the Miami Dolphins, Leonard recorded a team high 13 tackles, sacked Ryan Fitzpatrick once, intercepted a pass thrown by Fitzpatrick, and forced a fumble on tight end Mike Gesicki which was recovered by teammate Kenny Moore II in the 16–12 loss. In Week 13 against the Tennessee Titans, Leonard recorded 12 tackles and sacked Ryan Tannehill twice in the 31–17 loss. In Week 14, against the Tampa Bay Buccaneers, Leonard recorded nine tackles and intercepted two passes thrown by Jameis Winston, one of which was returned for an 80 yard pick six, during the 38–35 loss.

Following the season, he was voted into his first Pro Bowl appearance. Despite missing three games due to injury, Leonard had a team-leading 121 tackles including 71 solos, six tackles for loss, five sacks, six passes defended, five interceptions, and two forced fumbles. He also became the first NFL player since 1982 to have 10-plus sacks and five-plus interceptions in his first 25 games. He additionally in 2019 became the eighth player in NFL history to record five sacks and five interceptions in a single season, joining the likes of Pro Football Hall of Famers Brian Urlacher, Wilber Marshall and LeRoy Butler; Leonard was the first to achieve the feat in fewer than 15 games.

He was ranked 50th by his fellow players on the NFL Top 100 Players of 2020.

==== 2020 ====
In Week 8 against the Detroit Lions, Leonard recorded a team high nine tackles and recorded a strip sack on quarterback Matthew Stafford which was recovered by the Colts during the 41–21 win. In Week 9 against the Baltimore Ravens, Leonard recorded a team high 15 tackles (13 solo) and recovered a fumble forced by DeForest Buckner on Gus Edwards during the 24–10 loss. In Week 12 against the Titans, Leonard recorded a team high 14 tackles and sacked Ryan Tannehill once during the 45–26 loss. In Week 15 against the Texans, Leonard led the team with 15 tackles and forced a fumble on wide receiver Keke Coutee that was recovered by the Colts during the 27–20 win. In Week 17 against the Jacksonville Jaguars, Leonard led the team with 10 tackles and recorded a strip sack on Mike Glennon that was recovered by the Colts during the 28–14 win. Leonard was named the AFC Defensive Player of the Week for his performance. He was named to his second Pro Bowl and earned first team All-Pro honors. In the 2020 season, Leonard had three sacks, 132 total tackles, seven passes defended, and three forced fumbles in 14 games and starts. He was ranked 37th by his fellow players on the NFL Top 100 Players of 2021.

==== 2021 ====
On August 8, 2021, Leonard signed a five-year, $99.25 million contract including a $52.5 million guaranteed extension with the Colts, making him the highest-paid outside linebacker in the NFL.

In Week 15, Leonard had 10 tackles, one tackle for loss, a forced fumble, and an interception in a 27–17 win over the Patriots, earning AFC Defensive Player of the Week. In the 2021 season, Leonard had 122 total tackles, four interceptions, eight passes defended, and eight forced fumbles. His eight forced fumbles led the NFL in the 2021 season.

Leonard was named Associated Press First Team All-Pro. He is a four-time All-Pro choice (First Team in 2018, 2020 and 2021; Second Team in 2019). Leonard has the most total All-Pro selections and the most First Team All-Pro selections by a linebacker in Colts history.

He was named to his third consecutive Pro Bowl (third of his career). He was ranked 18th by his fellow players on the NFL Top 100 Players of 2022.

During the following offseason, Leonard had surgery on his back to correct nerves being impinged by his disks.

==== 2022 ====
Leonard missed the first three weeks of the season while recovering from offseason back surgery. He returned in Week 4, and suffered a concussion and broken nose in the game, missing the next three games. He suffered a setback in his back injury leading up to Week 10 and was placed on injured reserve on November 12, 2022, ending his season.

In early November 2023, Leonard expressed his frustration over the Colts coaches choosing to give him limited defensive snaps in the 2023 season compared to previous seasons despite him feeling recovered from his back surgery. Leonard was waived by the Colts on November 21, 2023.

=== Philadelphia Eagles ===
On December 4, 2023, Leonard signed with the Philadelphia Eagles. He would go on to play in five games (including three starts) for the Eagles, recording one sack and 23 combined tackles.

=== Retirement ===
On October 1, 2025 the Indianapolis Colts announced Leonard would retire as a Colt after not playing in the league for the 2024 season. In 70 games with the team, he had 614 tackles, 32 tackles for loss, 31 passes defensed, 12 interceptions, 17 forced fumbles and seven fumble recoveries.

== NFL career statistics ==
Legend
	Led the league
**Bold**	Career high

Regular season
Year	Team	Games		Tackles				Interceptions						Fumbles		
Year	Team	GP	GS	Cmb	Solo	Ast	Sck	PD	Int	Yds	Avg	Lng	TD	FF	FR	TD
2018	IND	15	15	**163**	**111**	**52**	**7.0**	**8**	2	38	**19.0**	28	0	4	2	0
2019	IND	13	13	121	71	50	5.0	7	**5**	**92**	18.4	**80T**	**1**	2	0	0
2020	IND	14	14	132	86	46	3.0	7	0	0	0.0	0	0	3	2	0
2021	IND	16	16	122	75	47	0.0	**8**	4	12	3.0	7	0	**8**	**3**	0
2022	IND	3	1	11	8	3	0.0	1	1	15	15.0	15	0	0	0	0
2023	IND	9	9	65	34	31	0.0	0	0	0	0.0	0	0	0	0	0
2023	PHI	5	3	23	12	11	1.0	0	0	0	0.0	0	0	0	0	0
Career		75	71	637	397	240	16.0	31	12	157	13.1	80T	1	17	7	0

Postseason
Year	Team	Games		Tackles				Interceptions						Fumbles		
Year	Team	GP	GS	Cmb	Solo	Ast	Sck	PD	Int	Yds	Avg	Lng	TD	FF	FR	TD
2018	IND	2	2	**27**	**15**	**12**	0.0	**1**	0	0	0.0	0	0	**1**	**1**	0
2020	IND	1	1	12	9	3	0.0	0	0	0	0.0	0	0	0	0	0
Career		3	3	39	24	15	0.0	1	0	0	0.0	0	0	1	1	0

== NFL awards ==
- NFL Defensive Rookie of the Year (2018)
- AP First-team All-Pro (2018; 2020; 2021)
- AP Second-team All-Pro (2019)
- 3× Pro Bowl (2019–2021)
- 4× AFC Defensive Player of the Week (Week 2, 2018; Week 17, 2018; Week 17, 2020; Week 15, 2021)
- AFC Defensive Player of the Month (December 2018)
- NFL Defensive Rookie of the Month (September 2018)
- Black College Football Pro Player of the Year Award (2019)
- 4× NFL Top 100 — 26th (2019), 50th (2020), 37th (2021), 18th (2022)

== Personal life ==
Leonard is one of nine children born to a single mother. In middle school, two of his older brothers were arrested and sentenced to life imprisonment for murder. His older brother is former NFL player Anthony Waters. After a November 11, 2017 game in which South Carolina State defeated Hampton, Leonard proposed to his girlfriend, Kayla, whom he had known since kindergarten. In December 2018, Leonard announced that the couple were expecting a baby girl. On March 28, 2019, Mia Leonard was born. On June 4, 2021, they welcomed their second daughter, Laila.

Leonard appeared on the July 12, 2020, episode of Celebrity Family Feud in which several NFL rising stars took on retired NFL Hall of Famers, including Michael Irvin and Cris Carter.

On July 26, 2022, at the Colts' training camp, Leonard told reporters that he preferred to be called by his middle name, Shaquille, rather than by his first name, Darius.
