= 2018 New York Giants season =

94th season in franchise history

- Owner: John Mara; Steve Tisch
- General manager: Dave Gettleman
- Head coach: Pat Shurmur
- Home stadium: MetLife Stadium

Results
- Record: 5–11
- Division place: 4th NFC East
- Playoffs: Did not qualify
- Pro Bowlers: RB Saquon Barkley; SS Landon Collins; K Aldrick Rosas; OLB Olivier Vernon; FS Michael Thomas

Uniform
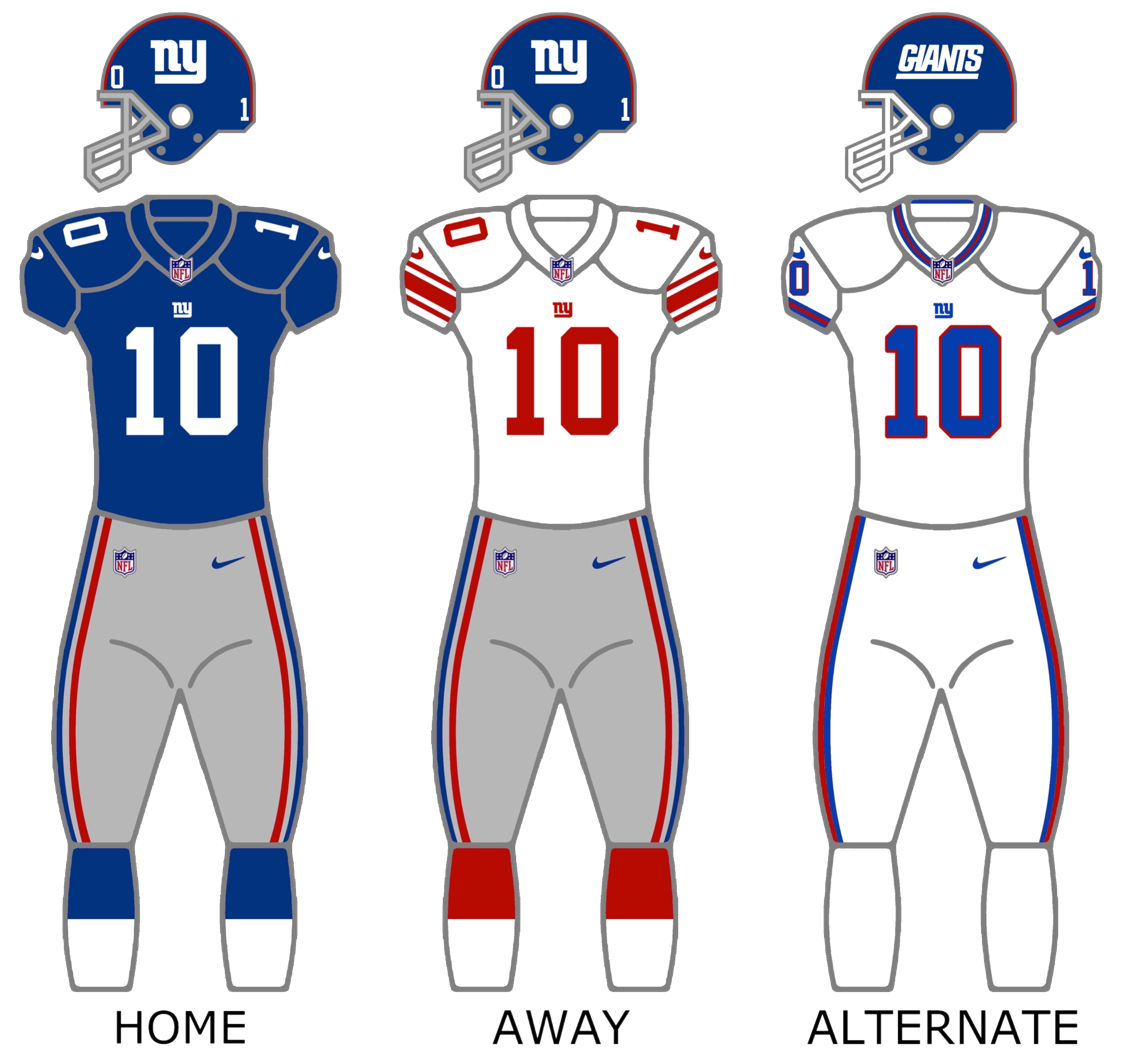

The 2018 season was the New York Giants' 94th in the National Football League (NFL), their ninth playing their home games at MetLife Stadium and their first under head coach Pat Shurmur. The Giants entered the season looking to improve on their 2017 campaign, which saw the team finish with a 3–13 record, their worst since the adoption of a 16-game regular season. Despite starting 1–7 for the second consecutive year, the Giants managed to improve on their 3–13 campaign with a 30–27 win over the Chicago Bears. After a 17–0 shutout loss to the Titans in Week 15, the Giants missed the playoffs for the second straight season. The season was highlighted by blown fourth-quarter leads and poor defensive play much like 2015, the Giants were in 12 one-possession games and lost eight games by seven points or fewer. 5 out of their 11 losses were by a combined 10 points. The Giants finished the season 5–11 and last place in the NFC East for the second straight year and the first time they finished last in back to back years since 1977 and 1978.

Despite the 5–11 record, the season was highlighted with rookie running back Saquon Barkley who won many awards including Pepsi Rookie of the Year, FedEx Ground NFL Player of the Year, AP NFL Offensive Rookie of the Year and was named to the PFWA All-Rookie Team and AP All-Rookie teams.

== Player movements ==
=== Free agency ===
==== Players with the Giants in the 2017 season ====
Position	Player	Tag	Date signed	2018 Team	Notes
TE	Ryan O'Malley	ERFA	April 6, 2018	New York Giants	1 year, $555,000 contract.
C	Jon Halapio	ERFA	March 12, 2018	New York Giants	1 year, $555,000 contract.
DT	Robert Thomas	ERFA	March 15, 2018	New York Giants	1 year, $630,000 contract
LB	Curtis Grant	ERFA			Not tendered
C	Brett Jones	RFA	April 9, 2018	New York Giants	1 year, $2.914 million contract.
LB	Deontae Skinner	RFA			Waived.
QB	Geno Smith	UFA	April 1, 2018	San Diego Chargers	1 year, $1 million contract.
RB	Orleans Darkwa	UFA			
RB	Shane Vereen	UFA		New Orleans Saints	1 year, $935,000 contract
WR	Tavarres King	UFA	April 5, 2018	Minnesota Vikings	1 year, $790,000 contract.
G	Justin Pugh	UFA	March 17, 2018	Arizona Cardinals	5 years, $45 million contract.
C	Weston Richburg	UFA	March 14, 2018	San Francisco 49ers	5 years, $47.5 million contract.
G	D. J. Fluker	UFA		Seattle Seahawks	1 year, $1.5 million contract.
G	John Greco	UFA	February 21, 2018	New York Giants	1 year, $1.015 million contract.
DE	Kerry Wynn	UFA	March 19, 2018	New York Giants	1 year, $1.25 million contract.
DT	Jay Bromley	UFA		New Orleans Saints	1 year, $790,000 contract.
LB	Devon Kennard	UFA	March 13, 2018	Detroit Lions	3 years, $18.75 million contract.
LB	Jonathan Casillas	UFA			
LB	Keenan Robinson	UFA		Buffalo Bills	1 year, $790,000 contract.
LB	Mark Herzlich	UFA	March 12, 2018	New York Giants	1 year, $1.105 million contract.
LB	Kelvin Sheppard	UFA			
LB	Akeem Ayers	UFA			
CB	Ross Cockrell	UFA	March 23, 2018	Carolina Panthers	2 years, $6.8 million contract.
CB	Darryl Morris	UFA			
S	Nat Berhe	UFA	April 4, 2018	Pittsburgh Steelers	1 year, $880,000 contract.

==== Players signed by the Giants from other teams ====
Date	Position	Player	Tag	2017 Team	Notes
March 14	OT	Nate Solder	UFA	New England Patriots	4 years, $62 million contract, which made Solder the NFL's highest paid offensive lineman.
March 14	OLB	Kareem Martin	UFA	Arizona Cardinals	3 years, $15 million contract.
March 14	G	Patrick Omameh	UFA	Jacksonville Jaguars	3 years, $15 million contract.
March 15	S	Curtis Riley	ERFA	Tennessee Titans	1 year, $630,000 contract.
March 19	WR	Cody Latimer	UFA	Denver Broncos	1 year, $2.5 million contract.
March 26	S	Michael Thomas	UFA	Miami Dolphins	2 years, $4 million contract.
June 12	TE	Scott Simonson	UFA	Carolina Panthers	1 year, $705,000 contract.
July 12	G	Zac Kerin	UFA	Detroit Lions	1 year, $630,000 contract.
July 24	OLB	Connor Barwin	UFA	Los Angeles Rams	2 years, $5 million contract.
August 3	CB	Leonard Johnson	UFA	Buffalo Bills	1 year, $790,000 contract.

=== Draft ===
2018 New York Giants draft
Round	Pick	Player	Position	College	Notes
1	2	Saquon Barkley *	RB	Penn State	
2	34	Will Hernandez	G	UTEP	
3	66	Lorenzo Carter	LB	Georgia	
3	69	B. J. Hill	DT	NC State	From Tampa Bay
4	108	Kyle Lauletta	QB	Richmond	From Tampa Bay
5	139	R. J. McIntosh	DT	Miami (FL)	
Made roster † Pro Football Hall of Fame * Made at least one Pro Bowl during career

Notes

- The Giants were awarded a fourth-round compensatory pick (135th overall).

Draft trades

- The Giants traded a compensatory fourth-round selection (135th overall) and a sixth-round selection (176th overall) to the Los Angeles Rams in exchange for a seventh-round selection in 2019 and linebacker Alec Ogletree.
- The Giants traded a fourth-round selection (102nd overall) and defensive end Jason Pierre-Paul to the Tampa Bay Buccaneers in exchange for a third-round selection (69th overall) and a fourth-round selection (108th overall).
- The Giants traded a seventh-round selection (220th overall) to the Pittsburgh Steelers in exchange for defensive back Ross Cockrell.

Supplemental Draft

- The Giants selected Western Michigan cornerback Sam Beal in the 2018 Supplemental draft. As a result, the team forfeited their 3rd-round selection in the 2019 draft.

=== Undrafted free agents ===
The Giants signed a number of undrafted free agents. Unless stated otherwise, they were signed on May 11, 2018.

Position	Player	College	Notes
TE	Stephen Baggett	East Carolina	Waived on May 14, 2018.
WR	Jawill Davis	Bethune–Cookman	Waived during final roster cuts on September 1, 2018; resigned to practice squad.
C	Evan Brown	SMU	Made roster.
T	Tyler Howell	Missouri	Waived on June 11, 2018.
DT	Tyrell Chavis	Penn State	Waived during final roster cuts on September 1, 2018.
LB	Tae Davis	Chattanooga	Made roster.
CB	Aaron Davis	Georgia	Waived/injured on June 12, 2018.
CB	Bryon Fields	Duke	Waived on May 14, 2018.
CB	Grant Haley	Penn State	Waived during final roster cuts on September 1, 2018; resigned to practice squad.
S	Sean Chandler	Temple	Made roster.
G	Nick Gates	Nebraska	Place on injured reserve on September 1, 2018.
RB	Robert Martin	Rutgers	Signed on May 14, 2018; made roster.
CB	Mike Jones	Temple	Signed on May 14, 2018; waived on June 4, 2018.
TE	Garrett Dickerson	Northwestern	Signed on June 4, 2018; waived during final roster cuts on September 1, 2018; resigned to practice squad.
S	Mike Basile	Monmouth	Signed on August 8, 2018; waived on August 20, 2019.

=== Other signings ===
Date	Position	Player	Previous team	Notes
March 7	ILB	Alec Ogletree	Los Angeles Rams	Acquired via trade (see trade details).
March 13	RB	Jonathan Stewart	Carolina Panthers	Free agent signing; 2 years, $6.9 million contract.
March 14	CB	Teddy Williams	Carolina Panthers	Free agent signing; 1 year, $880,000 contract.
March 19	CB	B. W. Webb	Cleveland Browns	Free agent signing; 1 year, $815,000 contract; 7th team in 6 NFL seasons.
March 19	DE	Josh Mauro	Arizona Cardinals	Free agent signing; 1 year, $880,000 contract.
April 5	CB	William Gay	Pittsburgh Steelers	Free agent signing; 1 year, $1.105 million contract.
April 21	P	Riley Dixon	Denver Broncos	Acquired via trade (see trade details).
May 2	QB	Alex Tanney	Tennessee Titans	Free agent signing; 1 year, $550,000 contract.
May 2	NT	A. J. Francis	Washington Redskins	Free agent signing; 1 year, $705,000 contract.
May 2	CB	C. J. Goodwin	Arizona Cardinals	From waivers.
May 3	S	Orion Stewart	Washington Redskins	Free agent signing; 1 year, $480,000 contract.
May 14	CB	Chris Lewis-Harris	Denver Broncos	Free agent signing.
May 14	WR	Alonzo Russell	Arizona Cardinals	Free agent signing.
May 14	G	Chris Scott	Carolina Panthers	Free agent signing.
May 14	G	Malcolm Bunche	Jacksonville Jaguars	Free agent signing.
May 22	WR	Russell Shepard	Carolina Panthers	Free agent signing; 1 year, $1.3 million contract.
June 5	P	Taylor Symmank	Minnesota Vikings	Free agent signing.
June 11	CB	Kenneth Durden	Tennessee Titans	Free agent signing.
June 11	OT	Jarron Jones	Dallas Cowboys	Free agent signing; 1 year, $480,000 contract.
July 25	DE	Izaah Lunsford	Green Bay Packers	Free agent signing.
July 30	CB	Kenneth Durden	New York Giants	Free agent signing; resigned by the Giants having been waived on July 11, 2019.
August 1	OT	Victor Salako	Cleveland Browns	From waivers.
August 20	RB	Jhurell Pressley	Jacksonville Jaguars	Free agent signing.
August 20	LB	Warren Long	Seattle Seahawks	Free agent signing.
September 2	WR	Kaelin Clay	Buffalo Bills	From waivers.
September 2	DE	Mario Edwards Jr.	Oakland Raiders	From waivers.
September 2	CB	Antonio Hamilton	Oakland Raiders	From waivers.
September 2	CB	Mike Jordan	Cleveland Browns	From waivers.
September 2	S	Kamrin Moore	New Orleans Saints	From waivers.
September 2	C	Spencer Pulley	Los Angeles Chargers	From waivers.
September 4	NT	John Jenkins	Chicago Bears	Free agent signing; 1 year, $790,000 contract.
September 5	LB	Nate Stupar	New Orleans Saints	Free agent signing; 1 year, $850,000 contract.
September 18	FB	Elijhaa Penny	Arizona Cardinals	Signed off the Cardinals practice squad.
September 19	WR	Stacy Coley	Minnesota Vikings	From waivers.
September 19	TE	Garrett Dickerson	New York Giants	Signed off the practice squad.
October 9	T	Brian Mihalik	New York Giants	Signed off the practice squad.
October 16	WR	Bennie Fowler	New England Patriots	Free agent signing.
October 16	LB	Ukeme Eligwe	New York Giants	Signed off the practice squad.
October 16	CB	Grant Haley	New York Giants	Signed off the practice squad.

==== Practice squad ====
Having been cut as the roster was trimmed to the 53-man limit on September 1, Jawill Davis, Garrett Dickerson, Grant Haley, Jhurell Pressley, Alonzo Russell, Victor Salako, Avery Moss and Calvin Munson cleared waivers and were resigned to the practice squad. They were joined over the following days by linebacker Ukeme Eligwe and defensive tackle Josh Banks, who had been waived by the Giants on September 2. On September 13, Munson was released and replaced by offensive tackle Brian Mihalik.

=== Other departures ===
Date	Position	Player	Notes
March 22	WR	Dwayne Harris	Released (vested veteran).
March 22	DE	Jason Pierre-Paul	Selected 15th overall in the 2010 NFL draft; traded to the Tampa Bay Buccaneers (see trade details).
April 19	WR	Brandon Marshall	Released (vested veteran).
April 20	T	Jessamen Dunker	Waived.
April 23	WR	Darius Powe	Waived.
May 7	S	Ryan Murphy	Waived.
May 7	G	Damien Mama	Waived.
May 7	P	Austin Rehkow	Waived.
May 7	WR	Canaan Severin	Waived.
May 7	RB	Terrell Watson	Waived.
May 11	T	Laurence Gibson	Waived.
May 14	T	Adam Bisnowaty	Sixth round pick in the 2017 NFL draft; waived.
May 14	CB	C. J. Goodwin	Waived.
May 14	TE	Stephen Baggett	Waived.
May 14	CB	Brandon Dixon	Waived.
May 14	CB	Bryon Fields	Waived.
May 14	LB	Derrick Mathews	Waived.
May 22	S	Tim Scott	Waived.
June 4	WR	Keeon Johnson	Signed as an undrafted free agent in 2017; waived.
June 4	CB	Mike Jones	Waived.
June 4	CB	Jeremiah McKinnon	Waived.
June 11	T	Tyler Howell	Waived.
July 11	CB	Kenneth Durden	Waived.
July 12	G	Ethan Cooper	Waived.
July 25	P	Taylor Symmank	Waived.
July 25	TE	Kyle Carter	Waived.
August 1	T	Jarron Jones	Waived.
August 3	CB	Kenneth Durden	Waived.
August 6	CB	Teddy Williams	Requested release due to family reasons.
August 20	LB	Mike Basile	Waived.
August 26	C	Brett Jones	Traded to the Minnesota Vikings (see trade details).
September 1	RB	Jhurell Pressley	Waived during final roster cuts.
September 1	RB	Jalen Simmons	Waived during final roster cuts.
September 1	WR	Kalif Raymond	Waived during final roster cuts.
September 1	WR	Travis Rudolph	Waived during final roster cuts.
September 1	WR	Alonzo Russell	Waived during final roster cuts.
September 1	WR	Jawill Davis	Waived during final roster cuts.
September 1	WR	Amba Etta-Tawo	Waived during final roster cuts.
September 1	WR	Marquis Bundy	Waived during final roster cuts.
September 1	WR	Roger Lewis Jr.	Waived during final roster cuts.
September 1	TE	Garrett Dickerson	Waived during final roster cuts.
September 1	TE	Ryan O'Malley	Waived during final roster cuts.
September 1	T	Victor Salako	Waived during final roster cuts.
September 1	G	Malcolm Bunche	Waived during final roster cuts.
September 1	G	Zac Kerin	Waived during final roster cuts.
September 1	DT	Izaah Lunsford	Waived during final roster cuts.
September 1	DT	Robert Thomas	Waived during final roster cuts.
September 1	DT	Tyrell Chavis	Waived during final roster cuts.
September 1	DT	A. J. Francis	Waived during final roster cuts.
September 1	LB	Avery Moss	Waived during final roster cuts.
September 1	LB	Calvin Munson	Waived during final roster cuts.
September 1	LB	Warren Long	Waived during final roster cuts.
September 1	CB	Grant Haley	Waived during final roster cuts.
September 1	CB	Mike Jones	Waived during final roster cuts.
September 1	CB	Orion Stewart	Waived during final roster cuts.
September 1	S	Andrew Adams	Waived during final roster cuts.
September 1	K	Marshall Koehn	Waived during final roster cuts.
September 1	G	Chris Scott	Released (vested veterans) during final roster cuts.
September 1	LB	Mark Herzlich	Released (vested veterans) during final roster cuts.
September 1	CB	Leonard Johnson	Released (vested veterans) during final roster cuts.
September 1	CB	Chris Lewis-Harris	Released (vested veterans) during final roster cuts.
September 2	QB	Davis Webb	Third round pick in the 2017 NFL draft; waived.
September 2	WR	Hunter Sharp	Waived.
September 2	TE	Jerell Adams	Sixth round pick in the 2016 NFL draft; waived.
September 2	DT	Josh Banks	Waived.
September 2	G	John Jerry	Released (vested veteran).
September 2	CB	William Gay	Released (vested veteran).

=== Trade details ===
On March 7, 2018, the Giants acquired linebacker Alec Ogletree from the Los Angeles Rams in exchange for a 4th (#135, John Franklin-Myers) and a 6th (#176. John Kelly) round pick in the 2018 NFL draft. In the deal, the Giants also acquired a 7th round pick in the 2019 NFL draft.

On March 22, 2018, the Giants traded defensive end Jason Pierre-Paul to the Tampa Bay Buccaneers in exchange for their 3rd round pick and swapping 4th round picks in the 2018 NFL Draft.

On April 20, 2018, the Giants acquired punter Riley Dixon from the Denver Broncos in exchange for a conditional 7th round draft pick in the 2019 NFL Draft.

On August 26, 2018, the Giants traded center Brett Jones to the Minnesota Vikings in exchange for a 7th round pick in the 2019 NFL Draft.

On October 23, 2018, the Giants traded cornerback Eli Apple to the New Orleans Saints in exchange for a 4th round pick in the 2019 NFL Draft and a 7th round pick in the 2020 draft.

== Staff ==
2018 New York Giants staff
Front office: President/CEO – John Mara; Chairman/executive vice president – Steve Tisch; General manager – Dave Gettleman; Vice president of football operations – Kevin Abrams; Senior vice president of player personnel – Chris Mara; Director of player personnel – Mark Koncz; Director of pro personnel – Ken Sternfeld; Assistant director of pro personnel – Matt Shauger; Director of college scouting – Chris Pettit; Director of player development – David Tyree; Head coaches: Head coach – Pat Shurmur; Offensive coaches: Offensive coordinator/quarterbacks – Mike Shula; Running backs – Craig Johnson; Wide receivers – Tyke Tolbert; Tight ends – Lunda Wells; Offensive line – Hal Hunter; Assistant offensive line – Ben Wilkerson; Offensive assistant – Ryan Roeder	Defensive coaches: Defensive coordinator – James Bettcher; Defensive line – Gary Emanuel; Linebackers – Bill McGovern; Assistant linebackers – Rob Leonard; Defensive backs – Lou Anarumo; Assistant defensive backs – Deshea Townsend; Defensive assistant – Bobby Blick; Special teams coaches: Special teams coordinator – Thomas McGaughey; Assistant special teams – Anthony Blevins; Assistant special teams – Tom Quinn; Strength and conditioning: Strength and conditioning – Aaron Wellman; Assistant strength and conditioning – Thomas Stallworth; Director of performance nutrition – Pratik Patel; Performance manager – Joe Danos

== Final roster ==
2018 New York Giants roster
Quarterbacks (QB): 17 Kyle Lauletta; 10 Eli Manning; 3 Alex Tanney; Running backs (RB): 26 Saquon Barkley; 22 Wayne Gallman; 39 Elijhaa Penny FB; Wide receivers (WR): 13 Odell Beckham Jr.; 19 Corey Coleman; 18 Bennie Fowler; 12 Cody Latimer; 84 Alonzo Russell; 81 Russell Shepard; 87 Sterling Shepard; Tight ends (TE): 89 Garrett Dickerson; 85 Rhett Ellison; 88 Evan Engram; 82 Scott Simonson	Offensive linemen (OL): 67 Evan Brown C; 78 Jamon Brown G; 73 John Greco C/G; 71 Will Hernandez G; 68 Brian Mihalik T; 77 Spencer Pulley C; 76 Nate Solder T; 63 Chad Wheeler T; Defensive linemen (DL): 99 Mario Edwards Jr. DE; 95 B. J. Hill DE; 91 John Jenkins NT; 97 Josh Mauro DE; 90 R. J. McIntosh DE; 94 Dalvin Tomlinson NT; 72 Kerry Wynn DE	Linebackers (LB): 53 Connor Barwin OLB; 59 Lorenzo Carter OLB; 58 Tae Davis LB; 45 Ukeme Eligwe ILB; 93 B. J. Goodson ILB; 96 Kareem Martin OLB; 52 Alec Ogletree LB; 57 Nate Stupar OLB; 54 Olivier Vernon OLB; Defensive backs (DB): 36 Sean Chandler FS; 34 Grant Haley CB; 20 Janoris Jenkins CB; 33 Kenny Ladler SS; 24 Tony Lippett CB; 29 Kamrin Moore FS; 35 Curtis Riley FS; 31 Michael Thomas SS; 23 B. W. Webb CB; Special teams (ST): 51 Zak DeOssie LS; 9 Riley Dixon P; 2 Aldrick Rosas K	Practice squad: 70 Woodrow Hamilton NT; 38 A. J. Howard S; 47 Myles Humphrey OLB; 25 Robert Martin RB; 4 Brock Miller P; 79 Avery Moss OLB; 64 Victor Salako T; 49 Hakeem Valles TE (IR); 69 Jylan Ware T; 43 Ronald Zamort CB; Reserve: 41 Sam Beal CB (IR); 21 Landon Collins SS (IR); 80 Jawill Davis WR (IR); 65 Nick Gates G (IR); 75 Jon Halapio C (IR); 30 Antonio Hamilton CB (IR); 15 Quadree Henderson WR (IR); 23 Paul Perkins RB (NF-Inj.); 60 Kristjan Sokoli DE (IR); 28 Jonathan Stewart RB (IR); 79 Jordan Williams DE (IR); Rookies in italics 53 active, 12 reserve, 9 practice squad

== Schedule ==
=== Preseason ===
Week	Date	Opponent	Result	Record	Venue	Recap
1	August 9	Cleveland Browns	**L** 10–20	0–1	MetLife Stadium	Recap
2	August 17	at Detroit Lions	**W** 30–17	1–1	Ford Field	Recap
3	August 24	at New York Jets	**W** 22–16	2–1	MetLife Stadium	Recap
4	August 30	New England Patriots	**L** 12–17	2–2	MetLife Stadium	Recap

=== Regular season ===
Week	Date	Opponent	Result	Record	Venue	Recap
1	September 9	Jacksonville Jaguars	**L** 15–20	0–1	MetLife Stadium	Recap
2	September 16	at **Dallas Cowboys**	**L** 13–20	0–2	AT&T Stadium	Recap
3	September 23	at Houston Texans	**W** 27–22	1–2	NRG Stadium	Recap
4	September 30	New Orleans Saints	**L** 18–33	1–3	MetLife Stadium	Recap
5	October 7	at Carolina Panthers	**L** 31–33	1–4	Bank of America Stadium	Recap
6	October 11	**Philadelphia Eagles**	**L** 13–34	1–5	MetLife Stadium	Recap
7	October 22	at Atlanta Falcons	**L** 20–23	1–6	Mercedes-Benz Stadium	Recap
8	October 28	**Washington Redskins**	**L** 13–20	1–7	MetLife Stadium	Recap
9	Bye					
10	November 12	at San Francisco 49ers	**W** 27–23	2–7	Levi's Stadium	Recap
11	November 18	Tampa Bay Buccaneers	**W** 38–35	3–7	MetLife Stadium	Recap
12	November 25	at **Philadelphia Eagles**	**L** 22–25	3–8	Lincoln Financial Field	Recap
13	December 2	Chicago Bears	**W** 30–27 (OT)	4–8	MetLife Stadium	Recap
14	December 9	at **Washington Redskins**	**W** 40–16	5–8	FedExField	Recap
15	December 16	Tennessee Titans	**L** 0–17	5–9	MetLife Stadium	Recap
16	December 23	at Indianapolis Colts	**L** 27–28	5–10	Lucas Oil Stadium	Recap
17	December 30	**Dallas Cowboys**	**L** 35–36	5–11	MetLife Stadium	Recap

Note: Intra-division opponents are in bold text.

=== Game summaries ===
==== Week 1: vs. Jacksonville Jaguars ====
Week One: Jacksonville Jaguars at New York Giants – Game summary

Quarter	1	2	3	4	Total
**Jaguars**	3	10	0	7	**20**
Giants	3	3	3	6	**15**

at MetLife Stadium, East Rutherford, New Jersey

- Date: September 9
- Game time: 1:00 p.m. EDT
- Game weather: 59 °F (15 °C), rain
- Game attendance: 77,992
- Referee: Craig Wrolstad
- TV announcers (Fox): Kenny Albert, Ronde Barber and Tiki Barber
- Recap, Gamebook

Game information

**First quarter**

- JAX – Josh Lambo 39-yard field goal, 10:12. Jaguars 3–0. **Drive: 11 plays, 59 yards, 4:49.**
- NYG – Aldrick Rosas 27-yard field goal, 00:23. Tied 3–3. **Drive: 9 plays, 54 yards, 5:17.**

**Second quarter**

- JAX – Josh Lambo 39-yard field goal, 7:19. Jaguars 6–3. **Drive: 15 plays, 54 yards, 8:04.**
- JAX – T.J. Yeldon 1-yard pass from Blake Bortles (Josh Lambo kick), 2:42. Jaguars 13–3. **Drive: 5 plays, 57 yards, 2:36.**
- NYG – Aldrick Rosas 31-yard field goal, 00:04. Jaguars 13–6. **Drive: 10 plays, 62 yards, 2:38.**

**Third quarter**

- NYG – Aldrick Rosas 44-yard field goal, 09:18. Jaguars 13–9. **Drive: 11 plays, 49 yards, 5:42.**

**Fourth quarter**

- JAX – Myles Jack 32-yard interception return (Josh Lambo kick), 11:24 Jaguars 20–9.
- NYG – Saquon Barkley 68-yard run (run failed), 10:38. Jaguars 20–15. **Drive: 2 plays, 75 yards, 0:45.**

**Top passers**

- JAX – Blake Bortles – 18/33, 176 yards, TD, INT
- NYG – Eli Manning – 23/37, 224 yards, INT

**Top rushers**

- JAX – T.J. Yeldon – 14 rushes, 51 yards
- NYG – Saquon Barkley – 18 rushes, 106 yards, TD

**Top receivers**

- JAX – Keelan Cole – 3 receptions, 54 yards
- NYG – Odell Beckham Jr. – 11 receptions, 111 yards

With the loss, the Giants started 0–1 for the second consecutive season. First round pick Saquon Barkley scored his first career NFL touchdown on a 68-yard run early in the fourth quarter.

==== Week 2: at Dallas Cowboys ====
Week Two: New York Giants at Dallas Cowboys – Game summary

Quarter	1	2	3	4	Total
Giants	0	0	3	10	**13**
**Cowboys**	10	0	3	7	**20**

at AT&T Stadium, Arlington, Texas

- Date: September 16
- Game time: 8:20 pm. EDT/7:20 p.m. CDT
- Game weather: Played indoors (retractable roof closed)
- Game attendance: 95,512
- Referee: John Parry
- TV announcers (NBC): Al Michaels, Cris Collinsworth and Michele Tafoya
- Recap, Gamebook

Game information

**First quarter**

- DAL – Tavon Austin 64-yard pass from Dak Prescott (Brett Maher kick), 13:37. Cowboys 7–0. **Drive: 3 plays, 75 yards, 1:34.**
- DAL – Brett Maher 37-yard field goal, 6:06. Cowboys 10–0. **Drive: 8 plays, 64 yards, 3:58.**

**Second quarter**

- No scoring plays

**Third quarter**

- DAL – Brett Maher 29-yard field goal, 10:47. Cowboys 13–0. **Drive: 6 plays, 16 yards, 2:39.**
- NYG – Aldrick Rosas 28-yard field goal, 4:34. Cowboys 13–3. **Drive: 11 plays, 66 yards, 6:12.**

**Fourth quarter**

- DAL – Ezekiel Elliott 6-yard run (Brett Maher kick), 5:51. Cowboys 20–3. **Drive: 14 plays, 82 yards, 8:23.**
- NYG – Evan Engram 18-yard pass from Eli Manning (Aldrick Rosas kick), 1:32. Cowboys 20–10. **Drive: 11 plays, 75 yards, 2:09.**
- NYG – Aldrick Rosas 38-yard field goal, 0:15. Cowboys 20–13. **Drive: 8 plays, 33 yards, 1:16.**

**Top passers**

- NYG – Eli Manning – 33/44, 279 yards, TD
- DAL – Dak Prescott – 16/25, 160 yards, TD

**Top rushers**

- NYG – Saquon Barkley – 11 rushes, 28 yards
- DAL – Ezekiel Elliott – 17 rushes, 78 yards, TD

**Top receivers**

- NYG – Saquon Barkley – 14 receptions, 80 yards
- DAL – Tavon Austin – 2 receptions, 79 yards, TD

With the loss, the Giants started 0–2 for the second consecutive season. It was 20–3 for most of the 4th quarter until the Giants scored 10 points in the final 2:09.

==== Week 3: at Houston Texans ====
Week Three: New York Giants at Houston Texans – Game summary

Quarter	1	2	3	4	Total
**Giants**	7	13	0	7	**27**
Texans	3	3	3	13	**22**

at NRG Stadium, Houston, Texas

- Date: September 23
- Game time: 1:00 pm. EDT/12:00 pm. CDT
- Game weather: Played indoors (retractable roof closed)
- Game attendance: 71,838
- Referee: Walt Coleman
- TV announcers (Fox): Kenny Albert, Ronde Barber and Megan Olivi
- Recap, Gamebook

Game information

**First quarter**

- HOU – Kaʻimi Fairbairn 23-yard field goal, 10:10. Texans 3–0. **Drive: 11 plays, 69 yards, 4:50.**
- NYG – Saquon Barkley 15-yard run (Aldrick Rosas kick), 4:10. Giants 7–3. **Drive: 10 plays, 75 yards, 6:00.**

**Second quarter**

- NYG – Aldrick Rosas 44-yard field goal, 11:49. Giants 10–3. **Drive: 9 plays, 58 yards, 5:14.**
- NYG – Aldrick Rosas 30-yard field goal, 4:35. Giants 13–3. **Drive: 10 plays, 64 yards, 5:59.**
- NYG – Rhett Ellison 16-yard pass from Eli Manning (Aldrick Rosas kick), 1:20. Giants 20–3. **Drive: 6 plays, 71 yards, 1:56.**
- HOU – Kaʻimi Fairbairn 28-yard field goal, 0:00. Giants 20–6. **Drive: 9 plays, 65 yards, 1:20.**

**Third quarter**

- HOU – Kaʻimi Fairbairn 54-yard field goal, 8:41. Giants 20–9. **Drive: 7 plays, 41 yards, 3:13.**

**Fourth quarter**

- HOU – Will Fuller 6-yard pass from Deshaun Watson (pass failed), 7:37. Giants 20–15. **Drive: 7 plays, 67 yards, 3:32.**
- NYG – Sterling Shepard 7-yard pass from Eli Manning (Aldrick Rosas kick), 2:08. Giants 27–15. **Drive: 9 plays, 77 yards, 3:32.**
- HOU – Lamar Miller 4-yard pass from Deshaun Watson (Kaʻimi Fairbairn kick), 0:01. Giants 27–22. **Drive: 12 plays, 75 yards, 2:07.**

**Top passers**

- NYG – Eli Manning – 25/29, 297 yards, 2 TD
- HOU – Deshaun Watson – 24/40, 385 yards, 2 TD, INT

**Top rushers**

- NYG – Saquon Barkley – 17 rushes, 85 yards, TD
- HOU – Deshaun Watson – 5 rushes, 36 yards

**Top receivers**

- NYG – Odell Beckham – 9 receptions, 109 yards
- HOU – Will Fuller – 5 receptions, 101 yards, TD

Odell Beckham surpassed Lionel Taylor (319) for the most receptions by a player through his first 50 career games with 337 catches (he would be passed by Michael Thomas (346) in 2019).

With the win, the Giants improved to 1–2.

==== Week 4: vs. New Orleans Saints ====
Week Four: New Orleans Saints at New York Giants – Game summary

Quarter	1	2	3	4	Total
**Saints**	0	12	7	14	**33**
Giants	7	0	3	8	**18**

at MetLife Stadium, East Rutherford, New Jersey

- Date: September 30
- Game time: 4:25 pm. EDT
- Game weather: 71 °F (22 °C), partly cloudy
- Game attendance: 78,213
- Referee: Pete Morelli
- TV announcers (CBS): Jim Nantz, Tony Romo and Tracy Wolfson
- Recap, Gamebook

Game information

**First quarter**

- NYG – Sterling Shepard 2-yard pass from Eli Manning (Aldrick Rosas kick), 8:42. Giants 7–0. **Drive: 10 plays, 75 yards, 4:59.**

**Second quarter**

- NO – Wil Lutz – 42-yard field goal, 14:55. Giants 7–3. **Drive: 15 plays, 51 yards, 8:29.**
- NO – Wil Lutz – 34-yard field goal, 7:18. Giants 7–6. **Drive: 9 plays, 69 yards, 3:31.**
- NO – Wil Lutz – 37-yard field goal, 3:36. Saints 9–7. **Drive: 4 plays, −8 yards, 0:57.**
- NO – Wil Lutz – 26-yard field goal, 0:11. Saints 12–7. **Drive: 7 plays, 40 yards, 2:21.**

**Third quarter**

- NO – Alvin Kamara – 9-yard run (Wil Lutz kick), 7:16. Saints 19–7. **Drive: 7 plays, 80 yards, 3:17.**
- NYG – Aldrick Rosas – 33-yard field goal, 2:02. Saints 19–10. **Drive: 10 plays, 75 yards, 5:14.**

**Fourth quarter**

- NO – Alvin Kamara – 4-yard run (Wil Lutz kick), 6:47. Saints 26–10. **Drive: 14 plays, 74 yards, 6:39.**
- NYG – Saquon Barkley – 1-yard run (Eli Manning–Sterling Shepard pass), 3:44. Saints 26–18. **Drive: 10 plays, 75 yards, 3:03.**
- NO – Alvin Kamara – 49-yard run (Wil Lutz kick), 2:06. Saints 33–18. **Drive: 6 plays, 97 yards, 1:38.**

**Top passers**

- NO – Drew Brees – 18/32, 217 yards
- NYG – Eli Manning – 31/41, 255 yards, TD

**Top rushers**

- NO – Alvin Kamara – 19 rushes, 134 yards, 3 TD
- NYG – Saquon Barkley – 10 rushes, 44 yards, TD

**Top receivers**

- NO – Josh Hill – 3 receptions, 63 yards
- NYG – Sterling Shepard – 10 receptions, 77 yards, TD

Despite holding the Saints to four field goals in the first half, Alvin Kamara broke through in the second half, scoring three rushing touchdowns to put the game out of reach.

With the loss, the Giants fell to 1–3.

==== Week 5: at Carolina Panthers ====
Week Five: New York Giants at Carolina Panthers – Game summary

Quarter	1	2	3	4	Total
Giants	3	10	3	15	**31**
**Panthers**	7	13	0	13	**33**

at Bank of America Stadium, Charlotte, North Carolina

- Date: October 7
- Game time: 1:00 pm. EDT
- Game weather: 80 °F (27 °C), cloudy
- Game attendance: 74,221
- Referee: Jerome Boger
- TV announcers (Fox): Kenny Albert, Charles Davis and Pam Oliver
- Recap, Gamebook

Game information

**First quarter**

- NYG – Aldrick Rosas 42-yard field goal, 7:24. Giants 3–0. **Drive: 6 plays, 16 yards, 2:57.**
- CAR – Curtis Samuel 25-yard pass from Cam Newton (Graham Gano kick), 4:38. Panthers 7–3. **Drive: 5 plays, 57 yards, 2:48.**

**Second quarter**

- CAR – Colin Jones fumble recovery in end zone (Graham Gano kick), 14:06. Panthers 14–3.
- CAR – Graham Gano 47-yard field goal, 8:44. Panthers 17–3. **Drive: 7 plays, 51 yards, 4:24.**
- NYG – Saquon Barkley 57-yard pass from Odell Beckham Jr. (Aldrick Rosas kick), 6:37. Panthers 17–10. **Drive: 4 plays, 75 yards, 2:07.**
- CAR – Graham Gano 47-yard field goal, 2:36. Panthers 20–10. **Drive: 8 plays, 31 yards, 4:01.**
- NYG – Aldrick Rosas 53-yard field goal, 0:20. Panthers 20–13. **Drive: 7 plays, 40 yards, 2:16.**

**Third quarter**

- NYG – Aldrick Rosas 36-yard field goal, 7:34. Panthers 20–16. **Drive: 13 plays, 75 yards, 5:36.**

**Fourth quarter**

- CAR – Christian McCaffrey 18-yard pass from Cam Newton (Graham Gano kick), 11:21. Panthers 27–16. **Drive: 9 plays, 68 yards, 5:09.**
- NYG – Odell Beckham Jr. 33-yard pass from Eli Manning (Eli Manning–Rhett Ellison pass), 8:08. Panthers 27–24. **Drive: 2 plays, 34 yards, 0:45.**
- CAR – Graham Gano 39-yard field goal, 2:16. Panthers 30–24. **Drive: 12 plays, 54 yards, 5:52.**
- NYG – Saquon Barkley 15-yard pass from Eli Manning (Aldrick Rosas kick), 1:08. Giants 31–30. **Drive: 4 plays, 75 yards, 1:08.**
- CAR – Graham Gano 63-yard field goal, 0:01. Panthers 33–31. **Drive: 8 plays, 30 yards, 1:07.**

**Top passers**

- NYG – Eli Manning – 22/36, 326 yards, 2 TD, 2 INT
- CAR – Cam Newton – 21/35, 237 yards, 2 TD, 2 INT

**Top rushers**

- NYG – Saquon Barkley – 15 rushes, 48 yards
- CAR – Christian McCaffrey – 17 rushes, 58 yards

**Top receivers**

- NYG – Odell Beckham Jr. – 8 receptions, 131 yards, TD
- CAR – Devin Funchess – 4 receptions, 53 yards

Odell Beckham threw a touchdown pass to Saquon Barkley and also caught his first touchdown pass since breaking his ankle the year before. Similar to the Eagles game in Week 3 last season, the Giants rallied back in the 4th quarter, but were overshadowed by a 63-yard game-winning field goal by Graham Gano. However, controversy surrounded after the game, where players believed there was a wrong call on the final drive on a 3rd and 1 run by Christian McCaffrey and another wrong pass interference call on Landon Collins. This game marked the first time the Giants scored 30 or more points in a game since Week 17 of the 2015 season.

==== Week 6: vs. Philadelphia Eagles ====
Week Six: Philadelphia Eagles at New York Giants – Game summary

Quarter	1	2	3	4	Total
**Eagles**	14	10	7	3	**34**
Giants	3	3	7	0	**13**

at MetLife Stadium, East Rutherford, New Jersey

- Date: October 11
- Game time: 8:20 pm. EDT
- Game weather: 70 °F (21 °C), light rain
- Game attendance: 77,167
- Referee: Ronald Torbert
- TV announcers (Fox/NFLN): Joe Buck, Troy Aikman, Erin Andrews and Kristina Pink
- Recap, Gamebook

Game information

**First quarter**

- PHI – Alshon Jeffery 13-yard pass from Carson Wentz (Jake Elliott kick), 13:15. Eagles 7–0. **Drive: 3 plays, 16 yards, 1:00.**
- NYG – Aldrick Rosas 33-yard field goal, 10:09. Eagles 7–3. **Drive: 7 plays, 60 yards, 3:09.**
- PHI – Corey Clement 1-yard run (Jake Elliott kick), 1:28. Eagles 14–3. **Drive: 6 plays, 44 yards, 3:21.**

**Second quarter**

- NYG – Aldrick Rosas 21-yard field goal, 5:48. Eagles 14–6. **Drive: 9 plays, 65 yards, 2:30.**
- PHI – Zach Ertz 10-yard pass from Carson Wentz (Jake Elliott kick), 4:22. Eagles 21–6. **Drive: 4 plays, 75 yards, 1:22.**
- PHI – Jake Elliott 33-yard field goal, 1:34. Eagles 24–6. **Drive: 6 plays, 35 yards, 1:33.**

**Third quarter**

- PHI – Alshon Jeffery 1-yard pass from Carson Wentz (Jake Elliott kick), 8:42. Eagles 31–6. **Drive: 12 plays, 75 yards, 6:18.**
- NYG – Saquon Barkley 50-yard run (Aldrick Rosas kick), 6:10. Eagles 31–13. **Drive: 5 plays, 75 yards, 2:32.**

**Fourth quarter**

- PHI – Jake Elliott 30-yard field goal, 14:56. Eagles 34–13. **Drive: 13 plays, 64 yards, 6:18.**

**Top passers**

- PHI – Carson Wentz – 26/36, 278 yards, 3 TD
- NYG – Eli Manning – 24/43, 281 yards, INT

**Top rushers**

- PHI – Wendell Smallwood – 18 rushes, 51 yards
- NYG – Saquon Barkley – 13 rushes, 130 yards, TD

**Top receivers**

- PHI – Alshon Jeffery – 8 receptions, 74 yards, 2 TD
- NYG – Saquon Barkley – 9 receptions, 99 yards

The Giants were overmatched despite a strong performance from Saquon Barkley, who provided three explosive plays which effectively led to all 13 Giants points in the game.

On the Giants' opening drive, Barkley pulled off a 46-yard run to put the Giants in the red zone, but then the offense stalled and had to settle for a field goal. A few drives later, Barkley caught a screen pass from Eli Manning and took it 56 yards into the red zone, but once again the Giants had to settle for a field goal. Then on the first Giants drive of the second half, Barkley scored a touchdown on a 50-yard run. The Giants would fail to score again for the rest of the night, falling to 1-5 for the second consecutive season.

==== Week 7: at Atlanta Falcons ====
Week Seven: New York Giants at Atlanta Falcons – Game summary

Quarter	1	2	3	4	Total
Giants	0	3	3	14	**20**
**Falcons**	0	10	0	13	**23**

at Mercedes-Benz Stadium, Atlanta, Georgia

- Date: October 22
- Game time: 8:15 pm. EDT
- Game weather: 60 °F (16 °C), clear – retractable roof open
- Game attendance: 72,756
- Referee: Tony Corrente
- TV announcers (ESPN/WWOR): Joe Tessitore, Jason Witten, Booger McFarland and Lisa Salters
- Recap, Gamebook

Game information

**First quarter**

- No scoring plays.

**Second quarter**

- ATL – Marvin Hall 47-yard pass from Matt Ryan (Giorgio Tavecchio kick), 4:51. Falcons 7–0. **Drive: 3 plays, 86 yards, 1:01.**
- NYG – Aldrick Rosas 31-yard field goal, 0:50. Falcons 7–3. **Drive: 11 plays, 77 yards, 4:01.**
- ATL – Giorgio Tavecchio 40-yard field goal, 0:03. Falcons 10–3. **Drive: 6 plays, 53 yards, 0:47.**

**Third quarter**

- NYG – Aldrick Rosas 36-yard field goal, 3:51. Falcons 10–6. **Drive: 7 plays, 62 yards, 1:48.**

**Fourth quarter**

- ATL – Giorgio Tavecchio 50-yard field goal, 14:55. Falcons 13–6. **Drive: 7 plays, 43 yards, 3:56.**
- ATL – Tevin Coleman 30-yard run (Giorgio Tavecchio kick), 7:47. Falcons 20–6. **Drive: 9 plays, 65 yards, 5:14.**
- NYG – Saquon Barkley 2-yard run (pass failed), 4:47. Falcons 20–12. **Drive: 9 plays, 78 yards, 3:00.**
- ATL – Giorgio Tavecchio 56-yard field goal, 1:55. Falcons 23–12. **Drive: 8 plays, 37 yards, 2:52.**
- NYG – Odell Beckham Jr. 1-yard pass from Eli Manning (Saquon Barkley run), 0:05. Falcons 23–20. **Drive: 7 plays, 72 yards, 1:50.**

**Top passers**

- NYG – Eli Manning – 27/38, 399 yards, TD
- ATL – Matt Ryan – 31/39, 379 yards, TD

**Top rushers**

- NYG – Saquon Barkley – 14 rushes, 43 yards, TD
- ATL – Tevin Coleman – 11 rushes, 50 yards, TD

**Top receivers**

- NYG – Saquon Barkley – 9 receptions, 51 yards
- ATL – Julio Jones – 9 receptions, 104 yards

The Giants failed to capitalize on offense, including missing a critical 4th and Goal at the 1 yard line. They were unable to complete a comeback, and fell to 1–6 with the loss.

==== Week 8: vs. Washington Redskins ====
Week Eight: Washington Redskins at New York Giants – Game summary

Quarter	1	2	3	4	Total
**Redskins**	7	0	3	10	**20**
Giants	0	3	0	10	**13**

at MetLife Stadium, East Rutherford, New Jersey

- Date: October 28
- Game time: 1:00 pm. EDT
- Game weather: 51 °F (11 °C), cloudy
- Game attendance: 77,537
- Referee: Bill Vinovich
- TV announcers (Fox): Kenny Albert, Charles Davis and Pam Oliver
- Recap, Gamebook

Game information

**First quarter**

- WAS – Adrian Peterson 7-yard pass from Alex Smith (Dustin Hopkins kick), 2:53. Redskins 7–0. **Drive: 10 plays, 73 yards, 5:28.**

**Second quarter**

- NYG – Aldrick Rosas 37-yard field goal, 1:16. Redskins 7–3. **Drive: 9 plays, 51 yards, 2:03.**

**Third quarter**

- WAS – Dustin Hopkins 53-yard field goal, 4:51. Redskins 10–3. **Drive: 7 plays, 20 yards, 2:20.**

**Fourth quarter**

- WAS – Dustin Hopkins 39-yard field goal, 9:53. Redskins 13–3. **Drive: 7 plays, 47 yards, 4:27.**
- NYG – Aldrick Rosas 21-yard field goal, 4:08. Redskins 13–6. **Drive: 6 plays, 83 yards, 1:04.**
- WAS – Adrian Peterson 2-yard run (Dustin Hopkins kick), 3:06. Redskins 20–6. **Drive: 3 plays, 75 yards, 1:02.**
- NYG – Evan Engram 2-yard pass from Eli Manning (Aldrick Rosas kick), 0:17. Redskins 20–13. **Drive: 16 plays, 70 yards, 2:49.**

**Top passers**

- WAS – Alex Smith – 20/32, 178 yards, TD
- NYG – Eli Manning – 30/47, 316 yards, TD, 2 INT

**Top rushers**

- WAS – Adrian Peterson – 26 rushes, 149 yards, TD
- NYG – Saquon Barkley – 13 rushes, 38 yards

**Top receivers**

- WAS – Josh Doctson – 5 receptions, 49 yards
- NYG – Odell Beckham Jr. – 8 receptions, 136 yards

With the loss, the Giants entered their bye week at 1–7. This is the last time Washington beat the Giants as the Redskins, as they changed their name before the 2020 NFL season.

==== Week 10: at San Francisco 49ers ====
Week Ten: New York Giants at San Francisco 49ers – Game summary

Quarter	1	2	3	4	Total
**Giants**	7	3	10	7	**27**
49ers	3	10	7	3	**23**

at Levi's Stadium, Santa Clara, California

- Date: November 12
- Game time: 8:15 pm. EST/5:15 p.m. PST
- Game weather: 62 °F (17 °C), hazy
- Game attendance: 69,409
- Referee: Shawn Hochuli
- TV announcers (ESPN/KGO): Joe Tessitore, Jason Witten, Booger McFarland, and Lisa Salters
- Recap, Gamebook

Game information

**First quarter**

- SF – Robbie Gould 53-yard field goal, 10:13. 49ers 3–0. **Drive: 6 plays, 19 yards, 3:19.**
- NYG – Odell Beckham Jr. 10-yard pass from Eli Manning (Aldrick Rosas kick), 2:43. Giants 7–3. **Drive: 3 plays, 12 yards, 1:20.**

**Second quarter**

- SF – Matt Breida 3-yard run (Robbie Gould kick), 13:05. 49ers 10–7. **Drive: 7 plays, 65 yards, 4:38.**
- NYG – Aldrick Rosas 20-yard field goal, 1:50. Tied 10–10. **Drive: 14 plays, 55 yards, 6:45.**
- SF – Robbie Gould 36-yard field goal, 0:02. 49ers 13–10. **Drive: 11 plays, 52 yards, 1:48.**

**Third quarter**

- SF – Matt Breida 11-yard pass from Nick Mullens (Robbie Gould kick), 8:09. 49ers 20–10. **Drive: 11 plays, 65 yards, 6:51.**
- NYG – Odell Beckham Jr. 20-yard pass from Eli Manning (Aldrick Rosas kick), 6:36. 49ers 20–17. **Drive: 4 plays, 53 yards, 1:33.**
- NYG – Aldrick Rosas 31-yard field goal, 2:10. Tied 20–20. **Drive: 5 plays, 34 yards, 2:05.**

**Fourth quarter**

- SF – Robbie Gould 30-yard field goal, 2:46. 49ers 23–20. **Drive: 11 plays, 54 yards, 6:11.**
- NYG – Sterling Shepard 3-yard pass from Eli Manning (Aldrick Rosas kick), 0:53. Giants 27–23. **Drive: 9 plays, 69 yards, 1:53.**

**Top passers**

- NYG – Eli Manning – 19/31, 188 yards, 3 TD
- SF – Nick Mullens – 27/39, 250 yards, TD, 2 INT

**Top rushers**

- NYG – Saquon Barkley – 20 rushes, 67 yards
- SF – Matt Breida – 17 rushes, 101 yards, TD

**Top receivers**

- NYG – Odell Beckham Jr. – 4 receptions, 73 yards, 2 TD
- SF – George Kittle – 9 receptions, 83 yards

Despite fires threatening the region, the Giants and 49ers played a Monday Night thriller. The Giants managed to complete a comeback over the 49ers with Sterling Shepard's game-winning touchdown with 53 seconds remaining. The Giants snapped a 5-game losing streak and improved to 2–7. They beat an NFC team other than the Washington Redskins for the first time since Week 15 of the 2016 season. Odell Beckham Jr. also had 2 touchdowns in the win. This was the last primetime win of Eli Manning's career.

==== Week 11: vs. Tampa Bay Buccaneers ====
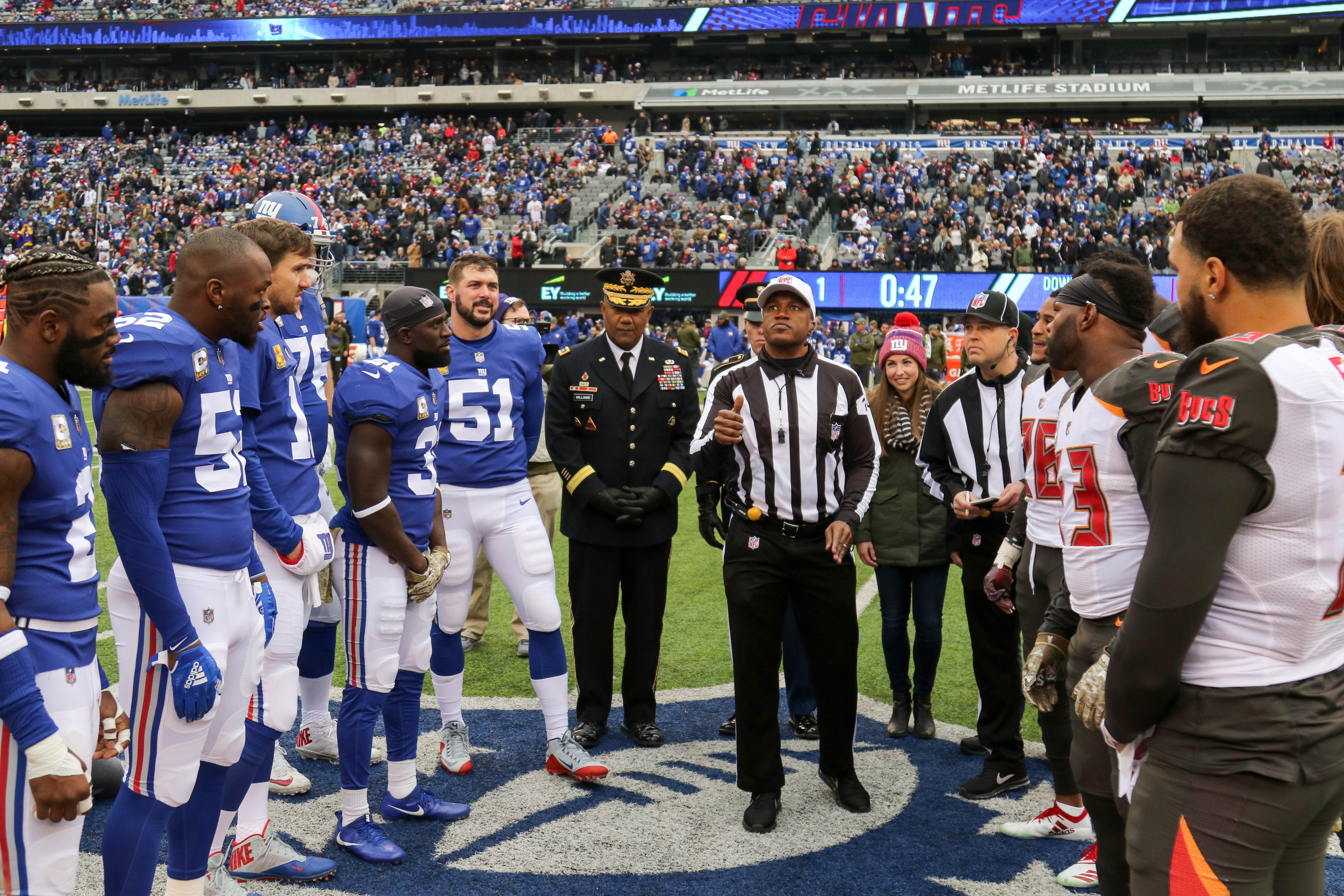
The coin flip at the beginning of the game vs. Buccaneers

Week Eleven: Tampa Bay Buccaneers at New York Giants – Game summary

Quarter	1	2	3	4	Total
Buccaneers	0	7	7	21	**35**
**Giants**	7	7	10	14	**38**

at MetLife Stadium, East Rutherford, New Jersey

- Date: November 18
- Game time: 1:00 pm. EST
- Game weather: 42 °F (6 °C), cloudy
- Game attendance: 75,863
- Referee: Shawn Smith
- TV announcers (Fox): Thom Brennaman, Chris Spielman and Shannon Spake
- Recap, Gamebook

Game information

**First quarter**

- NYG – Saquon Barkley 6-yard pass from Eli Manning (Aldrick Rosas kick), 11:42. Giants 7–0. **Drive: 6 plays, 63 yards, 3:18.**

**Second quarter**

- NYG – Saquon Barkley 5-yard run (Aldrick Rosas kick), 13:37. Giants 14–0. **Drive: 12 plays, 95 yards, 6:36.**
- TB – Ryan Fitzpatrick 1-yard run (Cairo Santos kick), 4:56. Giants 14–7. **Drive: 8 plays, 64 yards, 3:55.**

**Third quarter**

- NYG – Alec Ogletree 15-yard interception return (Aldrick Rosas kick), 14:13. Giants 21–7.
- NYG – Aldrick Rosas 52-yard field goal, 7:04. Giants 24–7. **Drive: 5 plays, 27 yards, 2:38.**
- TB – Mike Evans fumble recovery in end zone (Cairo Santos kick), 1:32. Giants 24–14. **Drive: 9 plays, 74 yards, 5:32.**

**Fourth quarter**

- NYG – Odell Beckham Jr. 8-yard pass from Eli Manning (Aldrick Rosas kick), 13:04. Giants 31–14. **Drive: 7 plays, 71 yards, 3:28.**
- TB – Peyton Barber 5-yard run (Cairo Santos kick), 9:47. Giants 31–21. **Drive: 7 plays, 77 yards, 3:17.**
- TB – Adam Humphries 8-yard pass from Jameis Winston (Cairo Santos kick), 5:11. Giants 31–28. **Drive: 7 plays, 70 yards, 2:22.**
- NYG – Saquon Barkley 2-yard run (Aldrick Rosas kick), 3:52. Giants 38–28. **Drive: 5 plays, 67 yards, 1:19.**
- TB – Mike Evans 41-yard pass from Jameis Winston (Cairo Santos kick), 2:22. Giants 38–35. **Drive: 6 plays, 66 yards, 1:30.**

**Top passers**

- TB – Jameis Winston – 12/16, 199 yards, 2 TD, INT
- NYG – Eli Manning – 17/18, 231 yards, 2 TD

**Top rushers**

- TB – Peyton Barber – 18 rushes, 106 yards, TD
- NYG – Saquon Barkley – 27 rushes, 142 yards, 2 TD

**Top receivers**

- TB – Mike Evans – 6 receptions, 120 yards, TD
- NYG – Odell Beckham Jr, – 4 receptions, 74 yards, TD

The Giants improved to 3–7 with 152 total yards and 3 touchdowns from Saquon Barkley. Eli Manning completed 17 of 18 passes with a 155.8 passer rating.

==== Week 12: at Philadelphia Eagles ====
Week Twelve: New York Giants at Philadelphia Eagles – Game summary

Quarter	1	2	3	4	Total
Giants	9	10	0	3	**22**
**Eagles**	0	11	3	11	**25**

at Lincoln Financial Field, Philadelphia, Pennsylvania

- Date: November 25
- Game time: 1:00 pm. EST
- Game weather: 56 °F (13 °C), mostly sunny
- Game attendance: 69,696
- Referee: Walt Anderson
- TV announcers (Fox): Thom Brennaman, Chris Spielman and Shannon Spake
- Recap, Gamebook

Game information

**First quarter**

- NYG – Saquon Barkley 13-yard pass from Eli Manning (pass failed), 10:38. Giants 6–0. **Drive: 9 plays, 75 yards, 4:22.**
- NYG – Aldrick Rosas 25-yard field goal, 3:13. Giants 9–0. **Drive: 10 plays, 87 yards, 5:04.**

**Second quarter**

- NYG – Aldrick Rosas 51-yard field goal, 9:34. Giants 12–0. **Drive: 10 plays, 54 yards, 5:26.**
- PHI – Jake Elliott 42-yard field goal, 5:19. Giants 12–3. **Drive: 7 plays, 46 yards, 4:15.**
- NYG – Saquon Barkley 51-yard run (Aldrick Rosas kick), 4:06. Giants 19–3. **Drive: 3 plays, 75 yards, 1:13.**
- PHI – Zach Ertz 15-yard pass from Carson Wentz (Corey Clement run), 1:04. Giants 19–11. **Drive: 6 plays, 75 yards, 3:02.**

**Third quarter**

- PHI – Jake Elliott 28-yard field goal, 6:49. Giants 19–14. **Drive: 8 plays, 37 yards, 3:18.**

**Fourth quarter**

- PHI – Josh Adams 1-yard run (Josh Adams run), 10:11. Eagles 22–19. **Drive: 7 plays, 61 yards, 3:54.**
- NYG – Aldrick Rosas 29-yard field goal, 5:49. Tied 22–22. **Drive: 8 plays, 56 yards, 4:22.**
- PHI – Jake Elliott 43-yard field goal, 0:22. Eagles 25–22. **Drive: 10 plays, 50 yards, 5:27.**

**Top passers**

- NYG – Eli Manning – 26/37, 297 yards, TD, INT
- PHI – Carson Wentz – 20/28, 236 yards, TD

**Top rushers**

- NYG – Saquon Barkley – 13 rushes, 101 yards, TD
- PHI – Josh Adams – 22 rushes, 84 yards, TD

**Top receivers**

- NYG – Odell Beckham Jr. – 5 receptions, 85 yards
- PHI – Zach Ertz – 7 receptions, 91 yards, TD

The Giants came out hot in a must win game, but squandered a 19–3-second quarter lead when Manning forced a pick deep in Eagles territory, who responded with a touchdown and 2-point conversion. The Eagles offense controlled the time of possession in the second half, and Jake Elliott kicked a game-winning field goal with 22 seconds remaining, his second against the Giants in as many seasons. With the loss, the Eagles tied the all-time series at 86–86–2, and is tied for the first time since it was 0–0 in 1933.

==== Week 13: vs. Chicago Bears ====
Week Thirteen: Chicago Bears at New York Giants – Game summary

Quarter	1	2	3	4	OT	Total
Bears	7	7	0	13	0	**27**
**Giants**	7	3	14	3	3	**30**

at MetLife Stadium, East Rutherford, New Jersey

- Date: December 2
- Game time: 1:00 pm. EST
- Game weather: 52 °F (11 °C), cloudy
- Game attendance: 76,465
- Referee: Clay Martin
- TV announcers (Fox): Kevin Burkhardt, Charles Davis and Pam Oliver
- Recap, Gamebook

Game information

**First quarter**

- NYG – Alec Ogletree 8-yard interception return (Aldrick Rosas kick), 14:14. Giants 7–0.
- CHI – Adam Shaheen 2-yard pass from Chase Daniel (Cody Parkey kick), 3:28. Tied 7–7. **Drive: 10 plays, 70 yards, 4:53.**

**Second quarter**

- CHI – Akiem Hicks 1-yard run (Cody Parkey kick), 3:40. Bears 14–7. **Drive: 9 plays, 74 yards, 5:21.**
- NYG – Aldrick Rosas 57-yard field goal, 0:00. Bears 14–10. **Drive: 5 plays, 18 yards, 1:14.**

**Third quarter**

- NYG – Russell Shepard 49-yard pass from Odell Beckham Jr. (Aldrick Rosas kick), 12:49. Giants 17–14. **Drive: 4 plays, 75 yards, 2:11.**
- NYG – Odell Beckham Jr. 1-yard pass from Eli Manning (Aldrick Rosas kick), 3:58. Giants 24–14. **Drive: 13 plays, 60 yards, 7:11.**

**Fourth quarter**

- CHI – Cody Parkey 36-yard field goal, 9:25. Giants 24–17. **Drive: 7 plays, 56 yards, 3:08.**
- NYG – Aldrick Rosas 37-yard field goal, 1:49. Giants 27–17. **Drive: 4 plays, 4 yards, 0:30.**
- CHI – Cody Parkey 21-yard field goal, 1:13. Giants 27–20. **Drive: 7 plays, 72 yards, 0:36.**
- CHI – Anthony Miller 1-yard pass from Tarik Cohen (Cody Parkey kick), 0:00. Tied 27–27. **Drive: 7 plays, 53 yards, 1:13.**

**Overtime**

- NYG – Aldrick Rosas 44-yard field goal, 5:57. Giants 30–27. **Drive: 8 plays, 49 yards, 4:03.**

**Top passers**

- CHI – Chase Daniel – 26/39, 285 yards, TD, 2 INT
- NYG – Eli Manning – 19/35, 170 yards, TD, INT

**Top rushers**

- CHI – Jordan Howard – 16 rushes, 76 yards
- NYG – Saquon Barkley – 24 rushes, 125 yards

**Top receivers**

- CHI – Tarik Cohen – 12 receptions, 156 yards
- NYG – Russell Shepard – 2 receptions, 59 yards, TD

The Giants won in overtime and was Eli Manning's 37th and final game-winning drive in his career, which at the time put him in 9th place all-time. In his final game with the Giants, Odell Beckham Jr. threw and caught a touchdown pass, as he was inactive for the last 4 games of the season with a quad injury and then traded to the Cleveland Browns in the offseason. Kicker Aldrick Rosas converted the longest field goal in Giants franchise history to end the first half.

With the win, the Giants improved to 4–8 and surpassed their win total from 2017.

==== Week 14: at Washington Redskins ====
Week Fourteen: New York Giants at Washington Redskins – Game summary

Quarter	1	2	3	4	Total
**Giants**	7	27	6	0	**40**
Redskins	0	0	0	16	**16**

at FedEx Field, Landover, Maryland

- Date: December 9
- Game time: 1:00 pm. EST
- Game weather: 33 °F (1 °C), cloudy
- Game attendance: 57,437
- Referee: Carl Cheffers
- TV announcers (Fox): Chris Myers, Daryl Johnston and Laura Okmin
- Recap, Gamebook

Game information

**First quarter**

- NYG – Curtis Riley 9-yard interception return (Aldrick Rosas kick), 2:45. Giants 7–0.

**Second quarter**

- NYG – Aldrick Rosas 35-yard field goal, 10:38. Giants 10–0. **Drive: 9 plays, 43 yards, 4:29.**
- NYG – Saquon Barkley 78-yard run (Aldrick Rosas kick), 8:42. Giants 17–0. **Drive: 1 plays, 78 yards, 0:12.**
- NYG – Sterling Shepard 3-yard pass from Eli Manning (Aldrick Rosas kick), 6:21. Giants 24–0. **Drive: 3 plays, 10 yards, 1:21.**
- NYG – Bennie Fowler III 6-yard pass from Eli Manning (Aldrick Rosas kick), 1:48. Giants 31–0. **Drive: 6 plays, 82 yards, 2:32.**
- NYG – Aldrick Rosas 23-yard field goal, 0:00. Giants 34–0. **Drive: 6 plays, 53 yards, 0:56.**

**Third quarter**

- NYG – Russell Shepard 11-yard pass from Eli Manning (kick failed, wide right), 5:38. Giants 40–0. **Drive: 9 plays, 81 yards, 5:40.**

**Fourth quarter**

- WAS – Josh Johnson 8-yard run (Josh Johnson–Vernon Davis pass), 11:56. Giants 40–8. **Drive: 5 plays, 33 yards, 2:05.**
- WAS – Jamison Crowder 79-yard pass from Josh Johnson (Josh Johnson–Michael Floyd pass), 8:48. Giants 40–16. **Drive: 2 plays, 77 yards, 1:35.**

**Top passers**

- NYG – Eli Manning – 14/22, 197 yards, 3 TD
- WAS – Josh Johnson – 11/16, 195 yards, TD, INT

**Top rushers**

- NYG – Saquon Barkley – 14 rushes, 170 yards, TD
- WAS – Josh Johnson – 7 rushes, 45 yards, TD

**Top receivers**

- NYG – Evan Engram – 3 receptions, 77 yards
- WAS – Jamison Crowder – 2 receptions, 87 yards, TD

This was the first time the Giants scored 40 or more points since Week 8 of the 2015 season and they improved to 5–8. Saquon Barkley also set a career high for rushing yards in a game.

==== Week 15: vs. Tennessee Titans ====
Week Fifteen: Tennessee Titans at New York Giants – Game summary

Quarter	1	2	3	4	Total
**Titans**	7	0	7	3	**17**
Giants	0	0	0	0	**0**

at MetLife Stadium, East Rutherford, New Jersey

- Date: December 16
- Game time: 1:00 pm. EST
- Game weather: 40 °F (4 °C), rain
- Game attendance: 74,538
- Referee: Shawn Hochuli
- TV announcers (CBS): Greg Gumbel, Trent Green, Bruce Arians and Melanie Collins
- Recap, Gamebook

Game information

**First quarter**

- TEN – Derrick Henry 1-yard run (Ryan Succop kick), 2:43. Titans 7–0. **Drive: 15 plays, 75 yards, 7:45.**

**Second quarter**

- No scoring plays.

**Third quarter**

- TEN – Derrick Henry 1-yard run (Ryan Succop kick), 2:20. Titans 14–0. **Drive: 5 plays, 14 yards, 2:47.**

**Fourth quarter**

- TEN – Ryan Succop 22-yard field goal, 5:06. Titans 17–0. **Drive: 11 plays, 49 yards, 7:03.**

**Top passers**

- TEN – Marcus Mariota – 12/20, 88 yards
- NYG – Eli Manning – 21/44, 229 yards, INT

**Top rushers**

- TEN – Derrick Henry – 33 rushes, 170 yards, 2 TD
- NYG – Saquon Barkley – 14 rushes, 31 yards

**Top receivers**

- TEN – Corey Davis – 3 receptions, 33 yards
- NYG – Evan Engram – 8 receptions, 75 yards

Both teams struggled to move the ball on a cold, rainy, and windy day. The Titans were able to silence Saquon Barkley while Derrick Henry finally broke through the Giants defense after wearing them down. The Giants were shut out for the first time since Week 16 the year before and eliminated from playoff contention, falling to 5-9. This was their first shutout at home since week 15 of the 2013 season.

==== Week 16: at Indianapolis Colts ====
Week Sixteen: New York Giants at Indianapolis Colts – Game summary

Quarter	1	2	3	4	Total
Giants	14	3	7	3	**27**
**Colts**	0	7	14	7	**28**

at Lucas Oil Stadium, Indianapolis, Indiana

- Date: December 23
- Game time: 1:00 pm. EST
- Game weather: Played indoors (retractable roof closed)
- Game attendance: 61,738
- Referee: Brad Allen
- TV announcers (CBS): Kevin Harlan, Rich Gannon and Steve Tasker
- Recap, Gamebook

Game information

**First quarter**

- NYG – Saquon Barkley 1-yard run (Aldrick Rosas kick), 8:11. Giants 7–0. **Drive: 11 plays, 45 yards, 5:54.**
- NYG – Scott Simonson 3-yard pass from Eli Manning (Aldrick Rosas kick), 1:41. Giants 14–0. **Drive: 9 plays, 87 yards, 4:29.**

**Second quarter**

- IND – Nyheim Hines 1-yard run (Adam Vinatieri kick), 4:09. Giants 14–7. **Drive: 12 plays, 78 yards, 6:48.**
- NYG – Aldrick Rosas 40-yard field goal, 1:10. Giants 17–7. **Drive: 9 plays, 53 yards, 2:59.**

**Third quarter**

- IND – Dontrelle Inman 2-yard pass from Andrew Luck (Adam Vinatieri kick), 7:38. Giants 17–14. **Drive: 7 plays, 85 yards, 4:11.**
- NYG – Eli Manning 1-yard run (Aldrick Rosas kick), 3:42. Giants 24–14. **Drive: 8 plays, 85 yards, 3:56.**
- IND – Marlon Mack 3-yard run (Adam Vinatieri kick), 0:32. Giants 24–21. **Drive: 7 plays, 74 yards, 3:10.**

**Fourth quarter**

- NYG – Aldrick Rosas 27-yard field goal, 9:20. Giants 27–21. **Drive: 12 plays, 66 yards, 6:12.**
- IND – Chester Rogers 1-yard pass from Andrew Luck (Adam Vinatieri kick), 0:55. Colts 28–27. **Drive: 8 plays, 53 yards, 2:48.**

**Top passers**

- NYG – Eli Manning – 25/33, 309 yards, TD, INT
- IND – Andrew Luck – 21/47, 357 yards, 2 TD, INT

**Top rushers**

- NYG – Saquon Barkley – 21 rushes, 43 yards, TD
- IND – Marlon Mack – 12 rushes, 34 yards, TD

**Top receivers**

- NYG – Sterling Shepard – 6 receptions, 113 yards
- IND – T. Y. Hilton – 7 receptions, 138 yards

Andrew Luck orchestrated the final game-winning drive of his career and the Giants fell to 5–10. The Colts were one of three teams Eli Manning never defeated in his career (the other two being the Giants and the Los Angeles Chargers).

==== Week 17: vs. Dallas Cowboys ====
Week Seventeen: Dallas Cowboys at New York Giants – Game summary

Quarter	1	2	3	4	Total
**Cowboys**	0	14	7	15	**36**
Giants	0	7	11	17	**35**

at MetLife Stadium, East Rutherford, New Jersey

- Date: December 30
- Game time: 1:00 pm. EST
- Game weather: 37 °F (3 °C), cloudy
- Game attendance: 77,750
- Referee: Clay Martin
- TV announcers (Fox): Kevin Burkhardt, Charles Davis and Pam Oliver
- Recap, Gamebook

Game information

**First quarter**

- No scoring plays.

**Second quarter**

- DAL – Blake Jarwin 13-yard pass from Dak Prescott (Brett Maher kick), 8:17. Cowboys 7–0. **Drive: 13 plays, 65 yards, 6:37.**
- DAL – Blake Jarwin 19-yard pass from Dak Prescott (Brett Maher kick), 1:55. Cowboys 14–0. **Drive: 9 plays, 75 yards, 5:24.**
- NYG – Cody Latimer 21-yard pass from Eli Manning (Aldrick Rosas kick), 0:22. Cowboys 14–7. **Drive: 10 plays, 73 yards, 1:35.**

**Third quarter**

- NYG – Aldrick Rosas 48-yard field goal, 9:05. Cowboys 14–10. **Drive: 8 plays, 15 yards, 4:10.**
- DAL – Blake Jarwin 39-yard pass from Dak Prescott (Brett Maher kick), 5:10. Cowboys 21–10. **Drive: 8 plays, 76 yards, 4:00.**
- NYG – Evan Engram 6-yard pass from Eli Manning (Eli Manning–Evan Engram pass), 2:00. Cowboys 21–18. **Drive: 5 plays, 73 yards, 3:07.**

**Fourth quarter**

- NYG – Wayne Gallman 2-yard run (Aldrick Rosas kick), 10:43. Giants 25–21. **Drive: 8 plays, 81 yards, 4:14.**
- DAL – Rod Smith 1-yard run (Brett Maher kick), 9:16. Cowboys 28–25. **Drive: 5 plays, 75 yards, 1:27.**
- NYG – Saquon Barkley 2-yard run (Aldrick Rosas kick), 3:27. Giants 32–28. **Drive: 12 plays, 74 yards, 5:50.**
- NYG – Aldrick Rosas 38-yard field goal, 2:39. Giants 35–28. **Drive: 4 plays, −2 yards, 0:34.**
- DAL – Cole Beasley 32-yard pass from Dak Prescott (Dak Prescott–Michael Gallup pass), 1:19. Cowboys 36–35. **Drive: 9 plays, 70 yards, 1:23.**

**Top passers**

- DAL – Dak Prescott – 27/44, 387 yards, 4 TD
- NYG – Eli Manning – 24/41, 301 yards, 2 TD, INT

**Top rushers**

- DAL – Rod Smith – 12 rushes, 35 yards, TD
- NYG – Saquon Barkley – 17 rushes, 109 yards, TD

**Top receivers**

- DAL – Blake Jarwin – 7 receptions, 119 yards, 3 TD
- NYG – Evan Engram – 5 receptions, 81 yards, TD

In a meaningless game for both teams, Dak Prescott and Eli Manning traded shots in the air, but it was Prescott and the Cowboys who had the last word. Prescott connected with Cole Beasley on a 4th Down and also connected with Michael Gallup on the ensuing two-point conversion. The Giants season ended at 5–11 and they lost their 4th consecutive game to the Cowboys. Saquon Barkley went on to win Rookie of the Year.

== Standings ==
=== Division ===
NFC East
	W	L	T	PCT	DIV	CONF	PF	PA	STK
^{(4)} Dallas Cowboys	10	6	0	.625	5–1	9–3	339	324	W2
^{(6)} Philadelphia Eagles	9	7	0	.563	4–2	6–6	367	348	W3
Washington Redskins	7	9	0	.438	2–4	6–6	281	359	L2
New York Giants	5	11	0	.313	1–5	4–8	369	412	L3

=== Conference ===
NFC
#	Team	Division	W	L	T	PCT	DIV	CONF	SOS	SOV	STK
Division leaders
1 (Note: New Orleans finished ahead of LA Rams based on head-to-head victory, claiming the No. 1 seed.)	New Orleans Saints	South	13	3	0	.813	4–2	9–3	.482	.488	L1
2	Los Angeles Rams	West	13	3	0	.813	6–0	9–3	.480	.428	W2
3	Chicago Bears	North	12	4	0	.750	5–1	10–2	.430	.419	W4
4	Dallas Cowboys	East	10	6	0	.625	5–1	9–3	.488	.444	W2
Wild Cards
5	Seattle Seahawks	West	10	6	0	.625	3–3	8–4	.484	.400	W2
6	Philadelphia Eagles	East	9	7	0	.563	4–2	6–6	.518	.486	W3
Did not qualify for the postseason
7	Minnesota Vikings	North	8	7	1	.531	3–2–1	6–5–1	.504	.355	L1
8 (Note: Atlanta finished ahead of Washington based on head-to-head victory. Atlanta finished ahead of Carolina based on head-to-head sweep. Washington finished ahead of Carolina based on head-to-head victory.)	Atlanta Falcons	South	7	9	0	.438	4–2	7–5	.482	.348	W3
9	Washington Redskins	East	7	9	0	.438	2–4	6–6	.486	.371	L2
10	Carolina Panthers	South	7	9	0	.438	2–4	5–7	.508	.518	W1
11	Green Bay Packers	North	6	9	1	.406	1–4–1	3–8–1	.488	.417	L1
12	Detroit Lions	North	6	10	0	.375	2–4	4–8	.504	.427	W1
13 (Note: NY Giants finished ahead of Tampa Bay based on head-to-head victory.)	New York Giants	East	5	11	0	.313	1–5	4–8	.527	.487	L3
14	Tampa Bay Buccaneers	South	5	11	0	.313	2–4	4–8	.523	.506	L4
15	San Francisco 49ers	West	4	12	0	.250	1–5	2–10	.504	.406	L2
16	Arizona Cardinals	West	3	13	0	.188	2–4	3–9	.527	.302	L4
Tiebreakers (Note: When breaking ties for three or more teams under the NFL's rules, they are first broken within divisions, then comparing only the highest-ranked remaining team from each division.)
