= Curtis Riley =

American football player (born 1992)

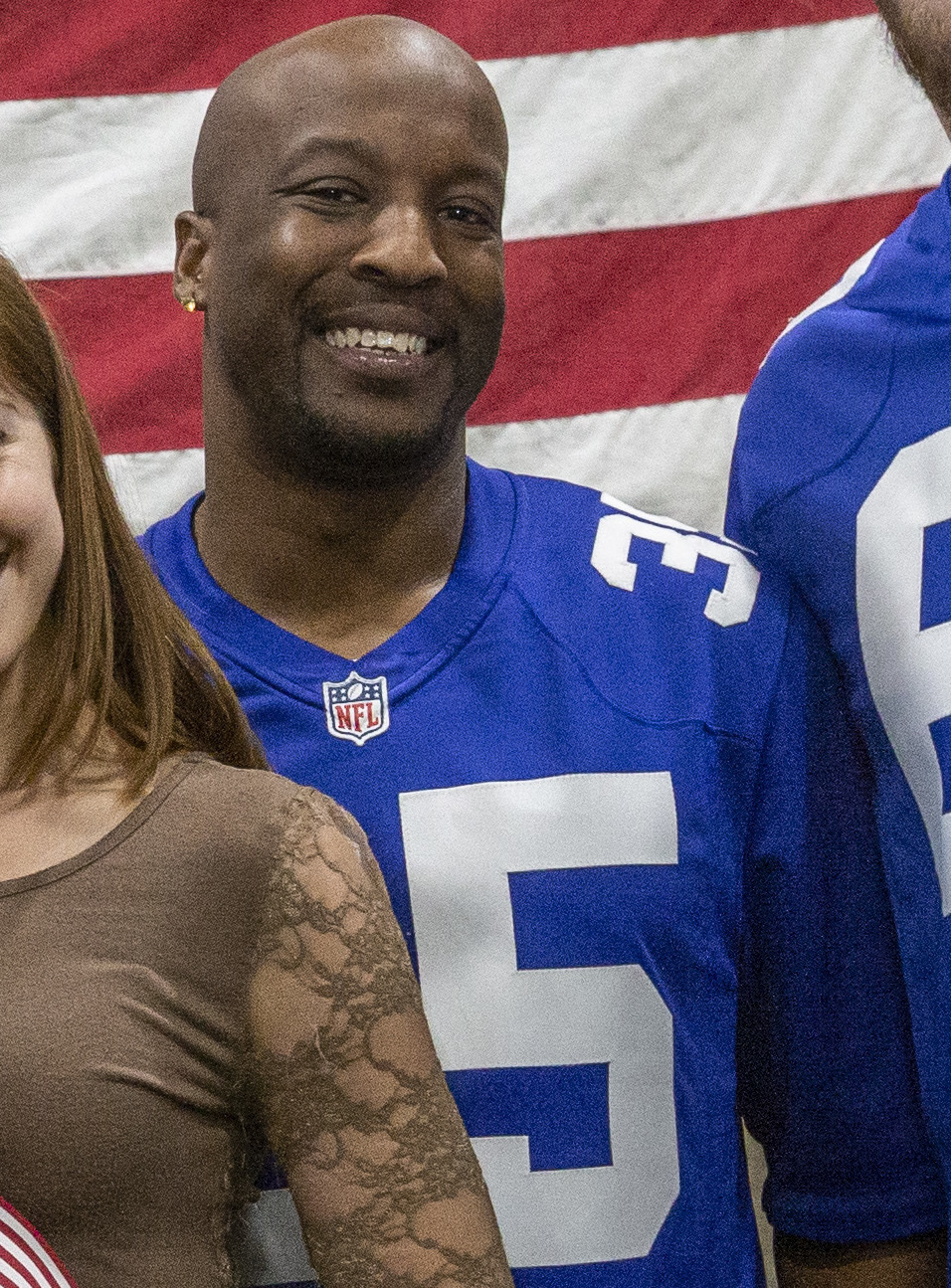
- Riley with the New York Giants in 2019

No. 35, 37
- Position: Safety

Personal information
- Born: July 18, 1992 (age 34); White Plains, New York, U.S.
- Listed height: 6 ft 0 in (1.83 m)
- Listed weight: 190 lb (86 kg)

Career information
- High school: University (Orlando, Florida)
- College: Fresno State
- NFL draft: 2015: undrafted

Career history
- Tennessee Titans (2015–2017); New York Giants (2018); Oakland Raiders (2019); Pittsburgh Steelers (2020)*; Arizona Cardinals (2020); Minnesota Vikings (2020); Tampa Bay Buccaneers (2021)
- * Offseason or practice squad member only

Career NFL statistics
- Total tackles: 131
- Forced fumbles: 1
- Pass deflections: 8
- Interceptions: 5
- Defensive touchdowns: 1
- Stats at Pro Football Reference

Curtis Kaazim Riley Jr. (born July 18, 1992) is an American former professional football player who was a safety in the National Football League (NFL). He played college football for the Fresno State Bulldogs. He played in the NFL for the Pittsburgh Steelers, Oakland Raiders, New York Giants, Tennessee Titans, Arizona Cardinals, and Minnesota Vikings.

== Professional career ==
Pre-draft measurables
Height	Weight	Arm length	Hand span	40-yard dash	10-yard split	20-yard split	20-yard shuttle	Three-cone drill	Vertical jump	Broad jump
6 ft 0 in (1.83 m)	190 lb (86 kg)	32 in (0.81 m)	9 1/8 in (0.23 m)	4.50 s	1.55 s	2.60 s	4.24 s	6.72 s	38.5 in (0.98 m)	10 ft 9 in (3.28 m)
All values from Fresno State's Pro Day

=== Tennessee Titans ===
Riley went undrafted in the 2015 NFL draft. On May 4, 2015, the Tennessee Titans signed Riley to a three-year, $1.58 million contract that includes a signing bonus of $12,000.

==== 2015 ====
Throughout training camp, Riley competed for a roster spot as a backup cornerback and special teams player against Khalid Wooten, Marqueston Huff, Cody Riggs, Jemea Thomas, and Ri'Shard Anderson. On August 10, 2015, the Titans waived Riley after he injured his ankle while making an interception during practice. He reverted to injured reserve after clearing waivers. On November 3, 2015, the Titans fired head coach Ken Whisenhunt after they fell to a 1–6 record and promoted assistant head coach/tight ends coach Mike Mularkey to interim head coach for the remainder of the season.

==== 2016 ====
Riley entered training camp as a backup cornerback and competed for a roster spot against B. W. Webb, Valentino Blake, Kalan Reed, Bennett Okotcha, Cody Riggs, and Josh Aubrey. On September 2, 2016, the Titans officially waived Riley as part of their final roster cuts, but signed him to their practice squad the following day. On September 22, 2016, the Titans promoted Riley to their active roster.

On October 9, 2016, Riley made his professional regular season debut in the Titans' 30–17 victory at the Miami Dolphins in Week 3. Riley was inactive as a healthy scratch for eight of the next 11 games (Weeks 6–7, 10–11, and 14–17).

==== 2017 ====
Riley competed for a roster spot as a backup safety against Brynden Trawick, Da'Norris Searcy, and Denzel Johnson. Head coach Mike Mularkey named Riley the backup free safety to start the season, behind Kevin Byard.

Riley was inactive for the Titans' season-opening loss to the Oakland Raiders. On September 17, 2017, Riley made one solo tackle, broke up a pass, and made his first career interception off a pass by quarterback Blake Bortles in the second half of a 37–16 victory at the Jacksonville Jaguars in Week 2. The interception helped set up the Titans on an eventual field goal scoring drive to close out the first half. In Week 4, he collected a season-high four solo tackles during a 57–14 loss at the Houston Texans. Riley was inactive for eight of the next nine games (Week 9–15). He finished the season with 12 combined tackles (eight solo), two pass deflections, and one interception in four games and zero starts.

=== New York Giants ===
On March 16, 2018, the New York Giants signed Riley to a one-year, $630,000 contract. Riley was reunited with Giants assistant defensive backs coach Deshea Townsend, who had previously held the same position with the Titans.

Riley started training camp as a cornerback and competed against Donte Deayon for a roster spot as the first-team nickelback, but was moved to safety after Darian Thompson suffered a hamstring injury. He competed to be the starting free safety against Thompson, Andrew Adams, Michael Thomas, and William Gay. Head coach Pat Shurmur named Riley the starting free safety to begin the regular season. He started alongside strong safety Landon Collins and cornerbacks Janoris Jenkins and Eli Apple.

He made his first career start in the Giants' season-opener against the Jacksonville Jaguars and recorded six combined tackles in their 20–15 loss. On October 7, 2018, Riley recorded three solo tackles, deflected a pass, and intercepted a pass by quarterback Cam Newton during a 33–31 loss at the Carolina Panthers in Week 5. On December 9 against the Washington Redskins, he scored his first NFL touchdown after intercepting a pass from Mark Sanchez.

=== Oakland Raiders ===
On March 22, 2019, Riley signed a one-year contract worth $810,000 with the Oakland Raiders.

=== Pittsburgh Steelers ===
On August 3, 2020, Riley signed a one-year contract with the Pittsburgh Steelers. He was released by Pittsburgh on September 6, 2020, and was subsequently re-signed to the practice squad.

=== Arizona Cardinals ===
On September 17, 2020, the Arizona Cardinals signed Riley to their active roster off of the Steelers' practice squad after Arizona's starting safety Jalen Thompson suffered an injury in Week 1 and was placed on injured reserve. He was released by Arizona on October 6, and was re-signed to the practice squad the following day. Riley was elevated to the active roster on October 10 for the team's Week 5 game against the New York Jets, and reverted to the practice squad after the game.

=== Minnesota Vikings ===
On October 30, 2020, the Minnesota Vikings signed Riley to their active roster off the Cardinals' practice squad. Riley was waived by Minnesota on December 12, and was re-signed to the practice squad three days later. His practice squad contract with the team expired after the season on January 11, 2021.

=== Tampa Bay Buccaneers ===
On May 17, 2021, Riley signed with the Tampa Bay Buccaneers. On July 22, he was waived/injured and placed on injured reserve.
