= Garrett Dickerson =

American football player (born 1995)

No. 89
- Position: Tight end

Personal information
- Born: December 30, 1995 (age 30); Englewood, New Jersey, U.S.
- Listed height: 6 ft 3 in (1.91 m)
- Listed weight: 248 lb (112 kg)

Career information
- High school: Bergen Catholic(Oradell, New Jersey)
- College: Northwestern
- NFL draft: 2018: undrafted

Career history
- New York Giants (2018–2019)
- Stats at Pro Football Reference

Garrett Dickerson (born December 30, 1995) is an American former professional football player who was a tight end in the National Football League (NFL). He played college football for the Northwestern Wildcats.

== Early life ==
Dickerson grew up in Englewood, New Jersey, and attended Bergen Catholic High School. While at Bergen Catholic, he set tight end school records with 52 catches, 776 yards and 10 touchdown receptions.

== College career ==
At Northwestern University, Dickerson played both tight end and H-back for the Wildcats. In 49 career games, Dickerson had 87 receptions for 887 yards and nine touchdowns. As a senior, he recorded career highs in receptions, with 37, and yards, with 401, and was named honorable mention All-Big Ten.

== Professional career ==
Dickerson was signed by the New York Giants as an undrafted free agent in June after participating in the team's rookie mini camp. After being cut by the Giants at the end of the preseason, Dickerson was signed to the team's practice squad on September 2, 2018. Dickerson was promoted to the active roster on September 25. Dickerson made his NFL debut on October 7, 2018, in a 31–33 loss to the Carolina Panthers, playing one snap. Following the signing of wide receiver Quadree Henderson, Dickerson was waived by the Giants on October 21, 2018, and subsequently re-signed to the team's practice squad on October 24. He was released on November 23, 2018, but was re-signed to the active roster three days later.

Dickerson was waived by the Giants on October 22, 2019. On November 12, 2019, he was re-signed to the Giants practice squad. He was promoted to the active roster on December 28, 2019. Dickerson played in four games with no targets in 2019.

On September 5, 2020, Dickerson was waived by the Giants.
