= Robert Thomas (defensive lineman) =

American football player (born 1991)

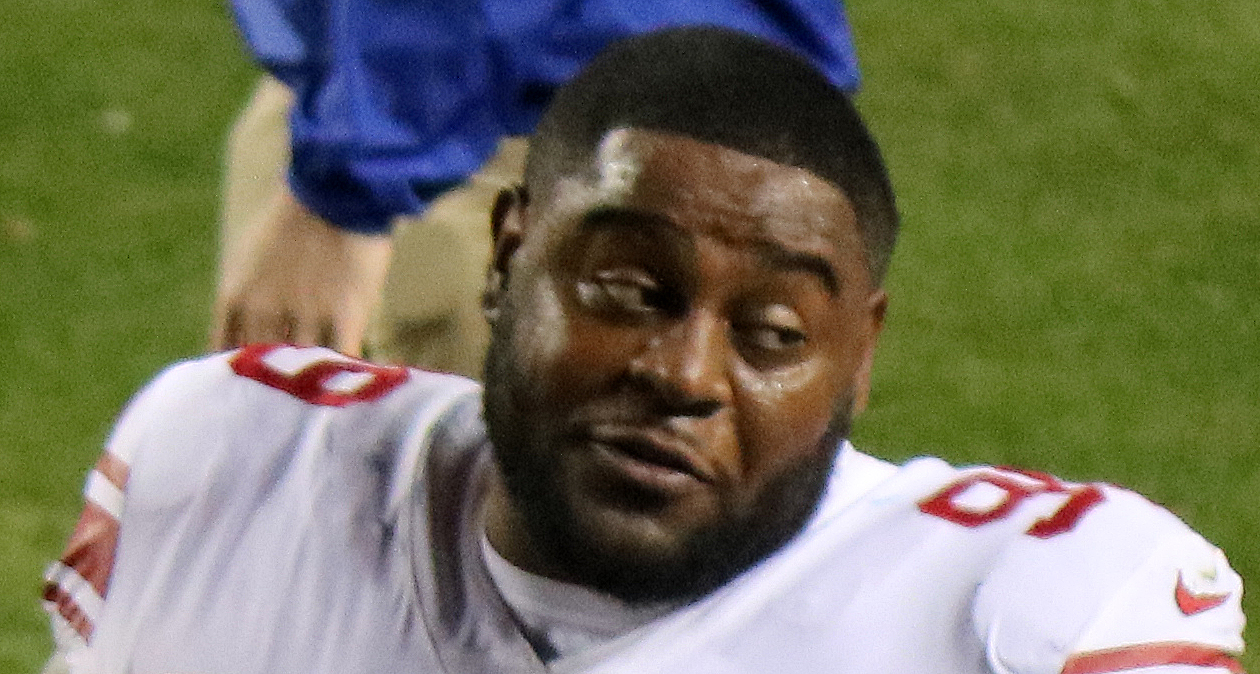
- Thomas with the New York Giants in 2017

No. 96, 99, 97
- Position: Nose tackle

Personal information
- Born: February 18, 1991 (age 35); Muskogee, Oklahoma, U.S.
- Listed height: 6 ft 1 in (1.85 m)
- Listed weight: 316 lb (143 kg)

Career information
- High school: Muskogee
- College: Arkansas
- NFL draft: 2014: undrafted

Career history
- Washington Redskins (2014); Seattle Seahawks (2015)*; New England Patriots (2015)*; Miami Dolphins (2015); Carolina Panthers (2016)*; New York Giants (2016–2017); Buffalo Bills (2018)
- * Offseason or practice squad member only

Career NFL statistics
- Total tackles: 22
- Sacks: 1
- Stats at Pro Football Reference

Robert Thomas (born February 18, 1991) is an American former professional football player who was a nose tackle in the National Football League (NFL). He was signed by the Washington Redskins as an undrafted free agent in 2014. He played college football for the Arkansas Razorbacks.

== Professional career ==
Pre-draft measurables
Height	Weight	Arm length	Hand span	Wingspan	40-yard dash	10-yard split	20-yard split	20-yard shuttle	Three-cone drill	Vertical jump	Broad jump	Bench press
6 ft 1 1/4 in (1.86 m)	327 lb (148 kg)	33 7/8 in (0.86 m)	10 in (0.25 m)	6 ft 8 in (2.03 m)	5.31 s	1.84 s	3.10 s	5.07 s	8.05 s	25.5 in (0.65 m)	8 ft 0 in (2.44 m)	37 reps
All values from NFL Combine/Pro Day

=== Washington Redskins ===
Thomas was signed by the Washington Redskins on May 10, 2014, as an undrafted free agent. He was waived on August 30 for final roster cuts, but signed to the practice squad the following day. He was promoted to the active roster on September 25. Two days later, the Redskins waived him. The Redskins re-signed Thomas to their practice squad on September 30. He signed a futures contract on December 29.

On September 5, 2015, Thomas was waived for final roster cuts before the start of the regular season.

=== Seattle Seahawks ===
Thomas was signed to the Seattle Seahawks' practice squad on September 7, 2015. He was waived on November 11.

=== New England Patriots ===
The New England Patriots signed Thomas to their practice squad on November 12, 2015.

=== Miami Dolphins ===
On December 1, 2015, the Miami Dolphins signed Thomas off the Patriots' practice squad. He was placed on the team's injured reserve on December 8.

On April 28, 2016, Thomas was waived.

=== Carolina Panthers ===
On April 29, 2016, Thomas was claimed off waivers by the Carolina Panthers. On September 3, 2016, he was waived by the Panthers as part of final roster cuts.

=== New York Giants ===
On September 4, 2016, Thomas was claimed off waivers by the Giants. On October 16, he made his Giants debut against the Baltimore Ravens. On November 14, Thomas recorded his first career sack against the Cincinnati Bengals.

On February 14, 2017, Thomas signed a one-year contract with the Giants.

On September 1, 2018, Thomas was released by the Giants.

=== Buffalo Bills ===
On September 3, 2018, Thomas was signed to the Buffalo Bills' practice squad. He was promoted to the active roster on September 15, 2018. He was waived on October 3, 2018 and was re-signed back to the practice squad. He signed a reserve/future contract with the Bills on December 31, 2018.

On August 10, 2019, Thomas was placed on injured reserve with a knee injury. He was released on August 20.
