= Kenneth Durden =

American football player (born 1992)

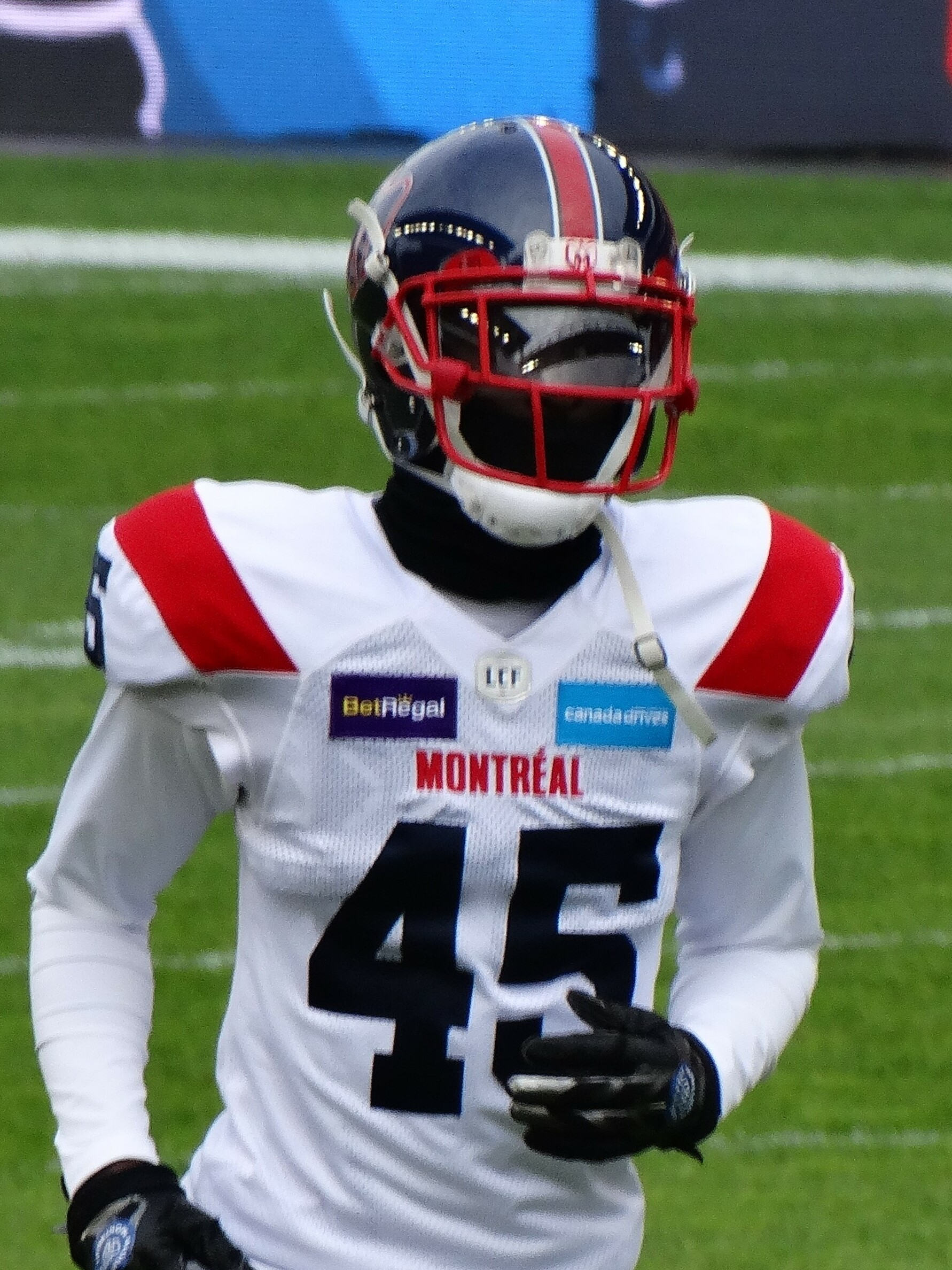
- Durden with the Montreal Alouettes in 2022

Tucson Sugar Skulls
- Position: Defensive back
- Roster status: Active

Personal information
- Born: May 16, 1992 (age 34); Valdosta, Georgia, U.S.
- Listed height: 6 ft 1 in (1.85 m)
- Listed weight: 180 lb (82 kg)

Career information
- High school: Lowndes (Valdosta, Georgia)
- College: South Florida (2011–2013); Youngstown State (2014–2015)
- NFL draft: 2016: undrafted

Career history
- Oakland Raiders (2016–2017)*; Tennessee Titans (2017)*; New York Giants (2018)*; Tennessee Titans (2018–2019); Montreal Alouettes (2022); Massachusetts Pirates (2023); Montreal Alouettes (2023)*; Massachusetts Pirates (2024); Tucson Sugar Skulls (2024–present)
- * Offseason or practice squad member only

Awards and highlights
- Grey Cup champion (2023)
- Stats at Pro Football Reference

Kenneth Durden (born May 16, 1992) is an American professional football defensive back for the Tucson Sugar Skulls of the Indoor Football League (IFL). He played college football for the South Florida Bulls and Youngstown State Penguins. He was signed by the Oakland Raiders as an undrafted free agent in 2016.

== College career ==
=== South Florida ===
Durden originally committed to South Florida where he played there for only three years before transferring to Youngstown State.

=== Youngstown State ===
Durden transferred to Youngstown State and played until he became eligible for the 2016 NFL draft.

== Professional career ==
=== Oakland Raiders ===
Durden signed with the Oakland Raiders as an undrafted free agent on May 10, 2016. He was waived by the Raiders on September 3, and was re-signed to the practice squad the following day. After spending the entire season on the practice squad, he signed a reserve/future contract with the Raiders on January 9, 2017.

On September 2, 2017, Durden was waived by the Raiders.

=== Tennessee Titans (first stint) ===
On September 5, 2017, Durden was signed to the Tennessee Titans' practice squad. He was released by the Titans on October 3.

=== New York Giants ===
On June 11, 2018, Durden signed with the New York Giants. He was waived by the Jets on July 11, but was re-signed by the team on July 29. Durden was waived again on August 3.

=== Tennessee Titans (second stint) ===
On August 11, 2018, Durden signed with the Tennessee Titans. He made the Titans' opening 53-man roster on September 1, but was waived on September 15. Three days later, Durden was re-signed by the Titans. He was waived on December 1, and re-signed to the practice squad. On December 18, after an injury to Logan Ryan, Durden was once again added to the active roster.

On August 31, 2019, Durden was waived by the Titans. On November 26, Durden was re-signed to the Titans' practice squad.

Durden signed a reserve/future contract with the Titans on January 23, 2020. On September 5, Durden was waived by the Titans.

=== Montreal Alouettes (first stint) ===
On March 9, 2022, Durden signed with the Montreal Alouettes. He played in seven regular season games in 2022 where he had 18 defensive tackles. On April 18, 2023, Durden was released by the Alouettes.

=== Massachusetts Pirates (first stint) ===
On July 6, 2023, Durden was signed by the Massachusetts Pirates of the Indoor Football League.

=== Montreal Alouettes (second stint) ===
Durden was signed to the Montreal Alouettes' practice roster on October 4, 2023. He was released by the Alouettes on November 20.

=== Massachusetts Pirates (second stint) ===
On March 23, 2024, Durden re-signed with the Massachusetts Pirates.

=== Tucson Sugar Skulls ===
The Pirates traded Durden to the Tucson Sugar Skulls on April 23, 2024.
