= Avery Moss =

American football player (born 1994)

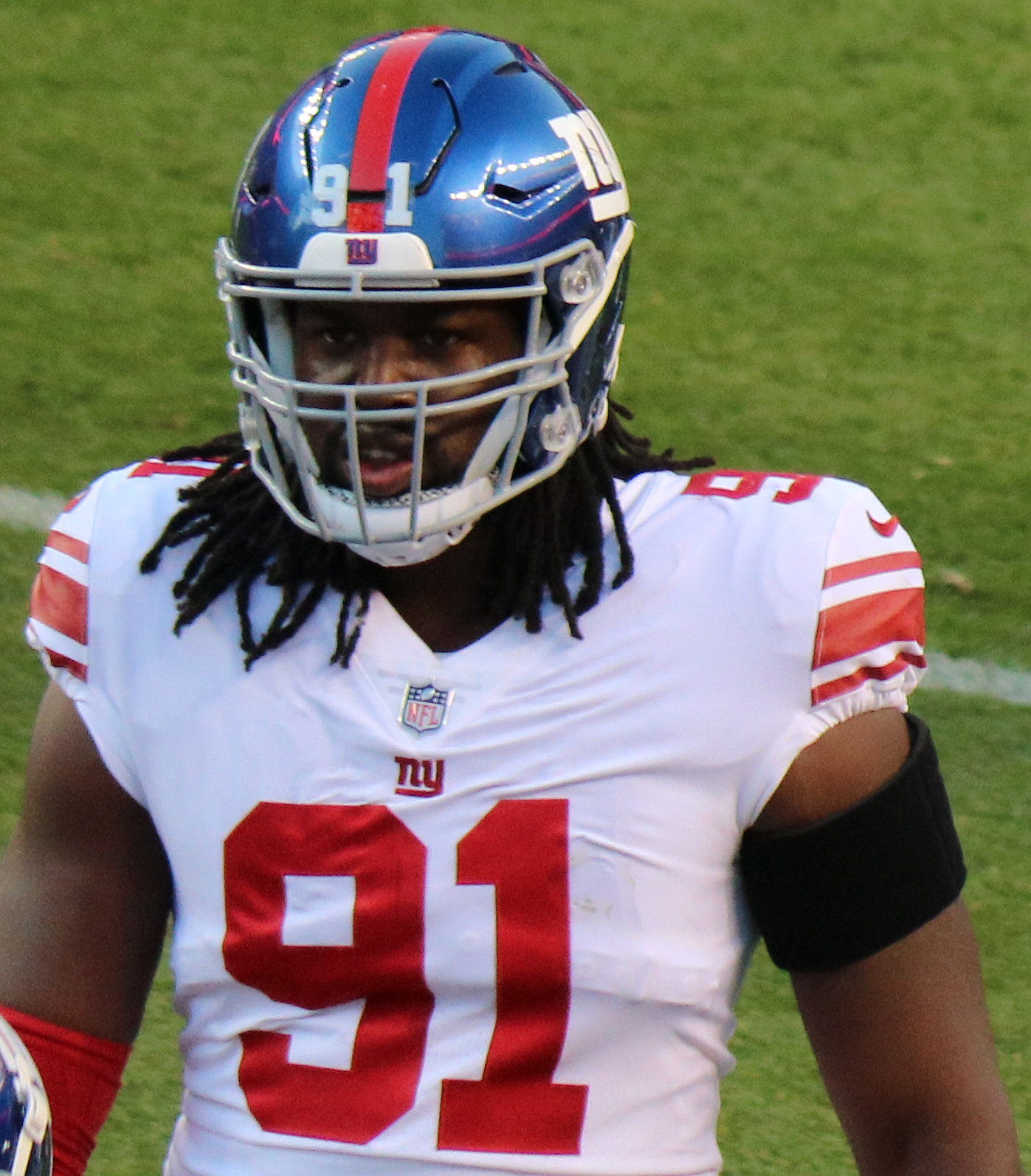
- Moss with the New York Giants in 2017

No. 91, 93
- Position: Linebacker

Personal information
- Born: September 16, 1994 (age 32); Compton, California, U.S.
- Listed height: 6 ft 3 in (1.91 m)
- Listed weight: 265 lb (120 kg)

Career information
- High school: Corona del Sol (Tempe, Arizona)
- College: Youngstown State
- NFL draft: 2017: 5th round, 167th overall pick

Career history
- New York Giants (2017–2018); Miami Dolphins (2019)

Career NFL statistics
- Total tackles: 39
- Forced fumbles: 2
- Stats at Pro Football Reference

Avery Moss (born September 16, 1994) is an American former professional football player who was a linebacker in the National Football League (NFL). He played college football for the Nebraska Cornhuskers and Youngstown State Penguins, and was selected by the New York Giants in the fifth round of the 2017 NFL draft.

== Early life ==
Moss played high school football at Corona del Sol High School. Moss was a three-star recruit coming out of high school and committed to Nebraska to play college football.

== College career ==
Moss played football at Nebraska from 2012–2013 and Youngstown State from 2015–2016. Moss did not play in 2014 after being banned from Nebraska's campus for indecent exposure.

== Professional career ==
=== New York Giants ===
Moss was selected by the New York Giants in the fifth round, 167th overall, in the 2017 NFL draft.

Moss forced his first career fumble against the Seattle Seahawks on October 22, 2017.

On September 1, 2018, Moss was waived by the Giants and was signed to the practice squad the next day. He signed a reserve/future contract with the Giants on January 14, 2019.

Moss was released by the Giants on September 1, 2019, during final roster cuts.

=== Miami Dolphins ===
On September 1, 2019, Moss was claimed off waivers by the Miami Dolphins. The Dolphins waived him on July 26, 2020.

Moss was re-signed on August 27, 2020, but was waived five days later.
