= Taylor Symmank =

American football player (born 1992)

Profile
- Position: Punter

Personal information
- Born: October 2, 1992 (age 34); McKinney, Texas, U.S.
- Listed height: 6 ft 2 in (1.88 m)
- Listed weight: 185 lb (84 kg)

Career information
- High school: McKinney Boyd; (McKinney, Texas)
- College: Texas Tech
- NFL draft: 2016: undrafted

Career history
- Minnesota Vikings (2017)*; New York Giants (2018)*; Arizona Hotshots (2019)*
- * Offseason or practice squad member only
- Stats at Pro Football Reference

Taylor Symmank (born October 2, 1992) is an American former football punter. He played college football at Texas Tech.

== College career ==
Symmank attended Southern Arkansas University in 2012 before transfer to Texas Tech University from 2013 to 2015. After a college career, he counts 99 punts at Texas Tech for 4,325 yards & 45 punts at Southern Arkansas for 1,797 yards.

== Professional career ==
=== Minnesota Vikings ===
On January 3, 2017, Symmank signed with the Minnesota Vikings. He was waived on September 2, 2017.

=== New York Giants ===
After participating in The Spring League earlier in 2018, Symmank signed with the New York Giants on June 5. He was waived on July 25, 2018.

=== Arizona Hotshots ===
In 2018, Symmank signed with the Arizona Hotshots of the Alliance of American Football for the 2019 season, but did not make the final roster.
