= Quadree Henderson =

American football player (born 1996)

No. 15, 81
- Position: Wide receiver

Personal information
- Born: September 12, 1996 (age 30); Wilmington, Delaware, U.S.
- Listed height: 5 ft 8 in (1.73 m)
- Listed weight: 190 lb (86 kg)

Career information
- High school: Alexis I. duPont (Wilmington)
- College: Pittsburgh
- NFL draft: 2018: undrafted

Career history
- Pittsburgh Steelers (2018)*; New York Giants (2018); New York Jets (2019)*; Jacksonville Jaguars (2019)*; Carolina Panthers (2019)*; Pittsburgh Steelers (2019–2020)*; Winnipeg Blue Bombers (2021)*; BC Lions (2021)
- * Offseason or practice squad member only

Awards and highlights
- Consensus All-American (2016); First-team All-ACC (2016); Second-team All-ACC (2017)

Career NFL statistics
- Return yards: 180
- Stats at Pro Football Reference

Quadree Khalid Henderson (born September 12, 1996) is an American former professional football player who was a wide receiver and return specialist. He played college football for the Pittsburgh Panthers.

== College career ==
A consensus All-American in 2016, Henderson lead the FBS with 1,166 total return yards. His 15.8 yards per punt return and 30.5 yards per kick return were good for third and fifth in the country, respectively. On offense he had 26 receptions for 286 yards and a touchdown, and 60 rushes for 631 yards and 5 touchdowns.

In 2017, Henderson lead the Panthers with 1,204 all-purpose yards (100.3/game), and was named 2nd team All-ACC returner.

On December 4, 2017, Henderson declared his intentions to enter the 2018 NFL draft.

== Professional career ==
Henderson was among seven Pitt Panthers in the 2018 Draft class invited to the NFL Scouting Combine.

Pre-draft measurables
Height	Weight	Arm length	Hand span	40-yard dash	10-yard split	20-yard split	20-yard shuttle	Three-cone drill	Vertical jump	Broad jump	Bench press
5 ft 8 in (1.73 m)	192 lb (87 kg)	29 1/2 in (0.75 m)	9 7/8 in (0.25 m)	4.50 s	1.58 s	2.64 s	4.28 s	6.89 s	32.5 in (0.83 m)	10 ft 0 in (3.05 m)	12 reps
All values from NFL Combine

=== Pittsburgh Steelers ===
Henderson signed with the Pittsburgh Steelers as an undrafted free agent on April 28, 2018. He was waived on September 1, 2018.

=== New York Giants ===
On October 3, Henderson was signed to the New York Giants' practice squad. Following the concussion of teammate Jawill Davis, Henderson was promoted the Giants' active roster on October 22, 2018. He was waived on November 6, 2018 and re-signed to the practice squad. He was promoted to the active roster on November 10, 2018. He was placed on injured reserve on November 26, 2018 with a shoulder injury.

On April 3, 2019, Henderson was waived by the Giants.

=== New York Jets ===
On April 5, 2019, Henderson was claimed off waivers by the New York Jets. He was waived on August 5, 2019.

=== Jacksonville Jaguars ===
On August 9, 2019, Henderson was signed by the Jacksonville Jaguars. He was waived on August 31, 2019.

In October 2019, Henderson was drafted by the XFL to play for the New York Guardians.

=== Carolina Panthers ===
On October 28, 2019, Henderson was signed to the Carolina Panthers practice squad. He was released on November 13.

=== Pittsburgh Steelers (second stint) ===
On November 18, 2019, Henderson was signed to the Pittsburgh Steelers practice squad. On December 30, he was signed by the Steelers to a reserve/future contract. He was waived on August 2, 2020.

=== Winnipeg Blue Bombers ===
Henderson signed with the Winnipeg Blue Bombers of the CFL on February 17, 2021. He was released on July 21, 2021.

=== BC Lions ===
Henderson signed with the Lions at the end of the 2021 season.

He announced his retirement on April 7, 2022.
