= Michael Thomas (defensive back) =

American football player (born 1990)

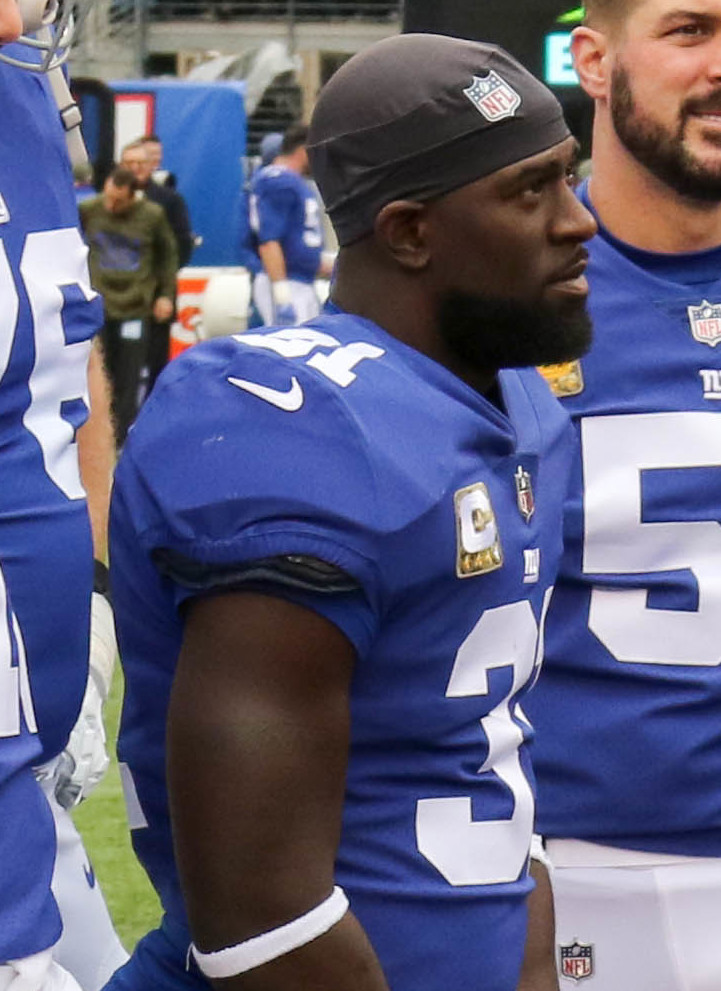
- Thomas with the New York Giants in 2018

No. 31, 28, 80
- Position: Safety

Personal information
- Born: March 17, 1990 (age 36); Houston, Texas, U.S.
- Listed height: 5 ft 11 in (1.80 m)
- Listed weight: 192 lb (87 kg)

Career information
- High school: Nimitz (Houston, Texas)
- College: Stanford
- NFL draft: 2012: undrafted

Career history
- San Francisco 49ers (2012–2013)*; Miami Dolphins (2013–2017); New York Giants (2018–2019); Houston Texans (2020); Cincinnati Bengals (2021–2023)
- * Offseason or practice squad member only

Awards and highlights
- Pro Bowl (2018); PFF 2010s All-Decade Team (Special Teams)

Career NFL statistics
- Total tackles: 343
- Sacks: 2.0
- Pass deflections: 16
- Interceptions: 3
- Forced fumbles: 3
- Fumble recoveries: 1
- Stats at Pro Football Reference

Michael Thomas (born March 17, 1990) is an American former professional football safety. He played college football for the Stanford Cardinal. He was signed by the San Francisco 49ers as an undrafted free agent in 2012.

== Professional career ==
Pre-draft measurables
Height	Weight	40-yard dash	10-yard split	20-yard split	20-yard shuttle	Three-cone drill	Vertical jump	Broad jump	Bench press
5 ft 9 7/8 in (1.77 m)	185 lb (84 kg)	4.51 s	1.57 s	2.64 s	3.99 s	7.03 s	38.0 in (0.97 m)	10 ft 4 in (3.15 m)	14 reps
All values from Pro Day

=== San Francisco 49ers ===
Thomas signed with the San Francisco 49ers as an undrafted free agent on May 4, 2012. He was waived on August 31, and was signed to the practice squad the next day. He spent the whole 2012 season on the practice squad.

On February 11, 2013, Thomas signed a reserve/future contract. On August 31, 2013, Thomas was waived by the 49ers and signed to the practice squad two days later.

=== Miami Dolphins ===
On December 10, 2013, Thomas was signed by the Miami Dolphins off the 49ers' practice squad. He made his professional debut the following week, where he recorded an interception off New England Patriots quarterback Tom Brady with two seconds left in the game to seal the Dolphins victory. He also broke up a touchdown pass intended for Danny Amendola before sealing the victory with his interception. After that game, he appeared in two more for the rest of the season.

In 2014, Thomas played in eight games with two starts before suffering a torn pectoral in Week 9. He was placed on injured reserve on November 3, 2014. He finished his second season with eighteen tackles.

Thomas became a starter for the Dolphins in 2015, starting 13 games at free safety. On December 20, 2015, he made a season-high 11 tackles against the San Diego Chargers. He finished the season with 85 tackles and two passes defended.

On September 18, 2016, Thomas recorded his first career sack and forced fumble against the Patriots. On December 4, he grabbed his first career fumble recovery against the Baltimore Ravens. On December 24, Thomas made a season-high eight tackles and his second career forced fumble (but the Bills recover it) against the Buffalo Bills. On December 29, Thomas was named the 2016 Good Guy Award winner, annually given "to a player for his professionalism and courtesy in assisting the media." Thomas played in all 16 games with eight starts recording 58 tackles, one sack, one pass defended, and two forced fumbles. The Dolphins finished with a record of 10-6 and made the playoffs for the first time since 2008. On January 8, 2017, Thomas in his first career playoff game recorded an interception against the Pittsburgh Steelers in the AFC Wild Card round. Along with teammate Xavien Howard, they become the first Dolphins to record interceptions in the playoffs since Calvin Jackson in 2000.

On April 17, 2017, Thomas signed his restricted free agent tender with the Dolphins. In 2017, Thomas played in 13 games with two starts before suffering a knee injury in Week 13. He made his first start of the season on November 5, replacing the injured Nate Allen. He was placed on injured reserve on December 29, 2017.

=== New York Giants ===
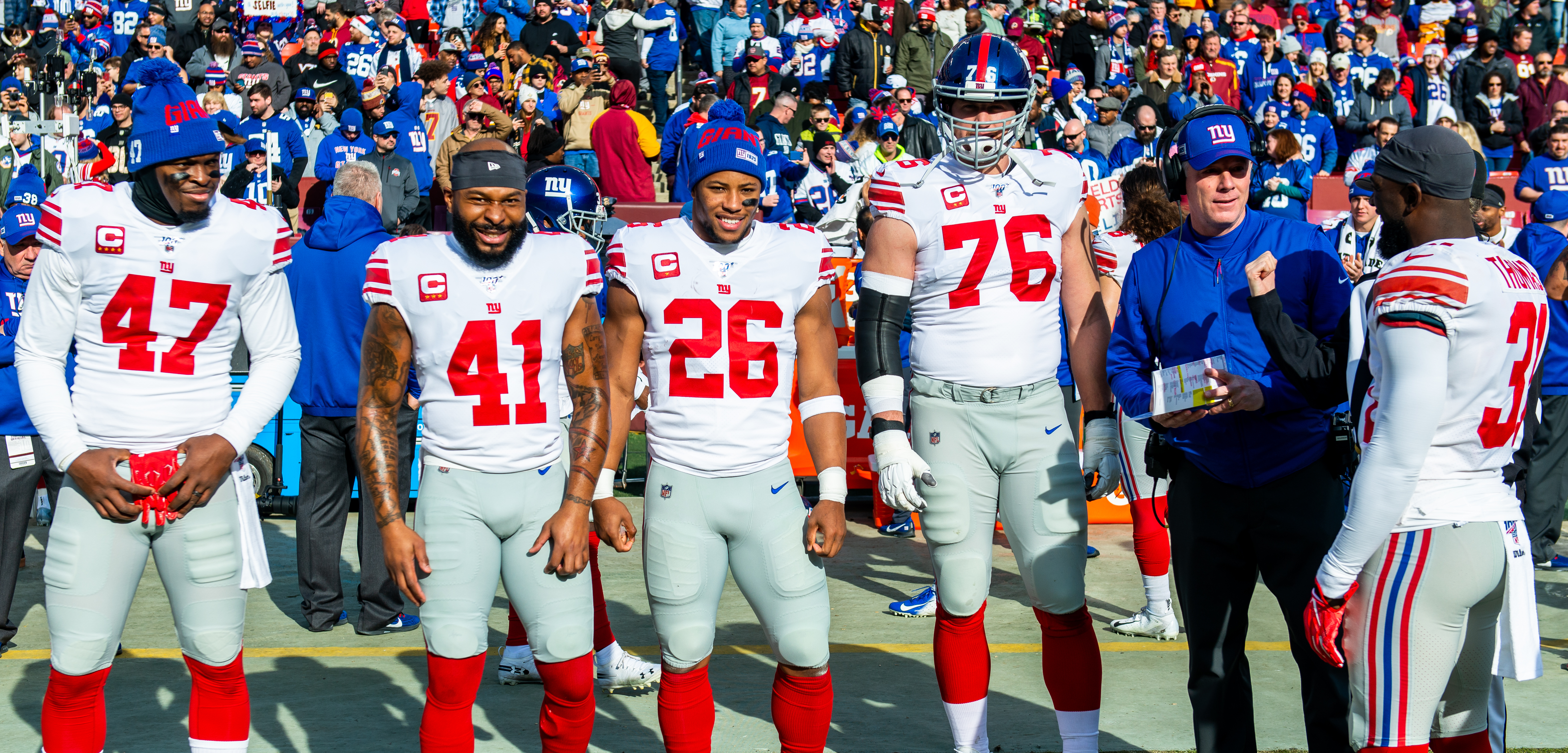
Thomas alongside other Giants' team captains in a game against the Washington Redskins

On March 26, 2018, Thomas signed a two-year contract with the New York Giants. Thomas had a career year with the Giants on defense and special teams. Thomas notched 59 total tackles, one sack, and two interceptions on defense while getting 16 of his tackles on special teams and recovering an onside kick for the Giants. He was named to the 2019 Pro Bowl as a special teams replacement for Super Bowl LIII bound Cory Littleton.

=== Houston Texans ===
On April 28, 2020, Thomas signed a one-year contract with the Houston Texans. In Week 10, Thomas suffered a season-ending torn pec and was placed on injured reserve on November 21, 2020.

=== Cincinnati Bengals ===
On October 5, 2021, Thomas was signed to the Cincinnati Bengals practice squad. He was promoted to the active roster on November 15.

Thomas re-signed with the Bengals on a one-year contract on March 17, 2022. He was cut by the Bengals on August 30, later being re-signed to the roster, second on the depth chart behind Vonn Bell. He was named as the Bengals' special teams captain on September 5, 2022. He has been nicknamed "Uncle Mike" by his Bengals teammates, due to many of the team's young defensive backs citing him as a mentor figure and veteran presence.

On March 13, 2023, Thomas re-signed with the Bengals on another one-year contract. He was released on August 29, 2023, and re-signed to the practice squad. He was not signed to a reserve/future contract after the season and thus became a free agent when his practice squad contract expired.

=== NFL statistics ===
Year	Team	GP	GS	COMB	TOTAL	AST	SCK	FF	FR	FR YDS	INT	IR YDS	AVG IR	LNG	TD	PD
2013	MIA	3	0	3	3	0	0.0	0	0	0	1	0	0	0	0	2
2014	MIA	8	2	18	15	3	0.0	0	0	0	0	0	0	0	0	0
2015	MIA	16	13	85	66	19	0.0	0	0	0	0	0	0	0	0	2
2016	MIA	16	8	58	43	15	1.0	2	1	27	0	0	0	0	0	1
2017	MIA	13	2	27	16	11	0.0	0	0	0	0	0	0	0	0	1
2018	NYG	16	6	59	41	18	1.0	1	0	0	2	26	13	26	0	6
2019	NYG	16	2	47	33	14	0.0	0	0	0	0	0	0	0	0	3
2020	HOU	9	0	16	8	8	0.0	0	0	0	0	0	0	0	0	0
2021	CIN	8	1	18	9	9	0.0	0	0	0	0	0	0	0	0	1
2022	CIN	16	0	12	5	7	0.0	0	0	0	0	0	0	0	0	0
Source	Career	121	34	343	239	104	2.0	3	1	27	3	26	8.6	26	0	16

== Personal life ==
In 2016, Thomas earned a Master of Business Administration degree from the University of Miami Business School.
