= Ukeme Eligwe =

American football player (born 1994)

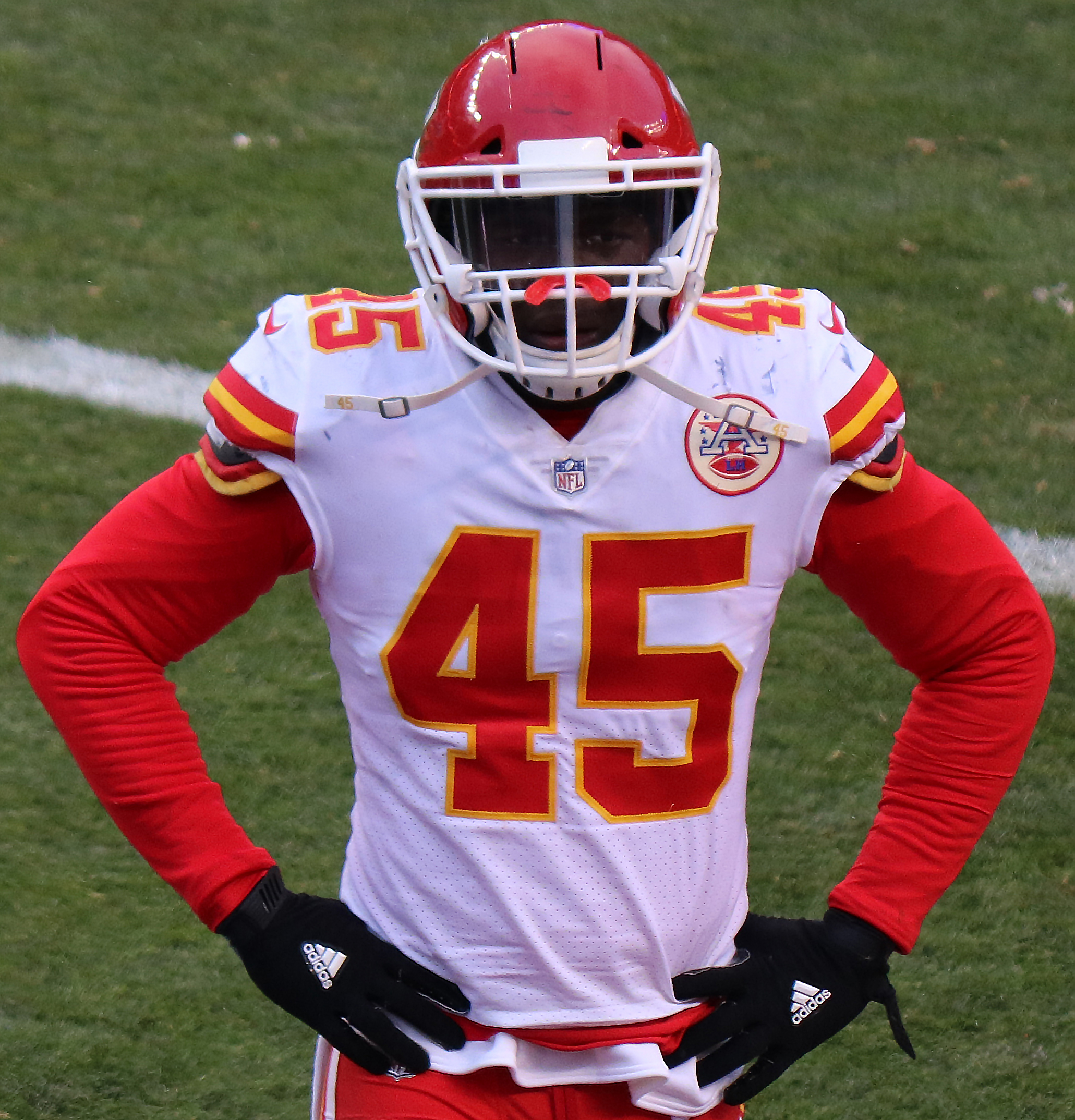
- Eligwe with the Kansas City Chiefs in 2017

No. 45
- Position: Linebacker

Personal information
- Born: April 27, 1994 (age 32); Atlanta, Georgia, U.S.
- Listed height: 6 ft 2 in (1.88 m)
- Listed weight: 239 lb (108 kg)

Career information
- High school: Stone Mountain (Stone Mountain, Georgia)
- College: Florida State (2012–2014); Georgia Southern (2015–2016)
- NFL draft: 2017: 5th round, 183rd overall pick

Career history
- Kansas City Chiefs (2017); New York Giants (2018); Tennessee Titans (2019)*; New York Jets (2019)*; Oakland / Las Vegas Raiders (2019–2020)
- * Offseason or practice squad member only

Awards and highlights
- BCS national champion (2013)

Career NFL statistics
- Total tackles: 12
- Sacks: 1.0
- Stats at Pro Football Reference

Ukeme Markuss Eligwe (born April 27, 1994) is a Nigerian-American former professional football player who was a linebacker in the National Football League (NFL). He played college football for the Florida State Seminoles and Georgia Southern Eagles, and was selected by the Kansas City Chiefs in the fifth round of the 2017 NFL draft. He was also a member of the New York Giants, Tennessee Titans, New York Jets, and Oakland / Las Vegas Raiders.

== Professional career ==
=== Kansas City Chiefs ===
Eligwe was selected by the Kansas City Chiefs in the fifth round, 183rd overall, in the 2017 NFL draft.

On September 1, 2018, Eligwe was waived by the Chiefs.

=== New York Giants ===
On September 3, 2018, Eligwe was signed to the practice squad of the New York Giants. On October 16, 2018, Eligwe was elevated to the active roster. He was waived on May 6, 2019.

=== Tennessee Titans ===
On August 10, 2019, Eligwe was signed by the Tennessee Titans. He was waived on August 31, 2019, and was signed to the practice squad the next day. He was released on October 15.

=== New York Jets ===
On October 26, 2019, Eligwe was signed to the New York Jets practice squad.

=== Oakland / Las Vegas Raiders ===
On December 19, 2019, Eligwe was signed off the Jets' practice squad onto the Oakland Raiders' active roster.

Eligwe chose to opt out of the 2020 season due to the COVID-19 pandemic on August 4, 2020. He was waived after the season on March 1, 2021.

== Personal life ==
Eligwe is of Nigerian descent. He is of the Ekpeye ethnic group in Rivers State, Nigeria.
