= Tae Davis =

American football player (born 1996)

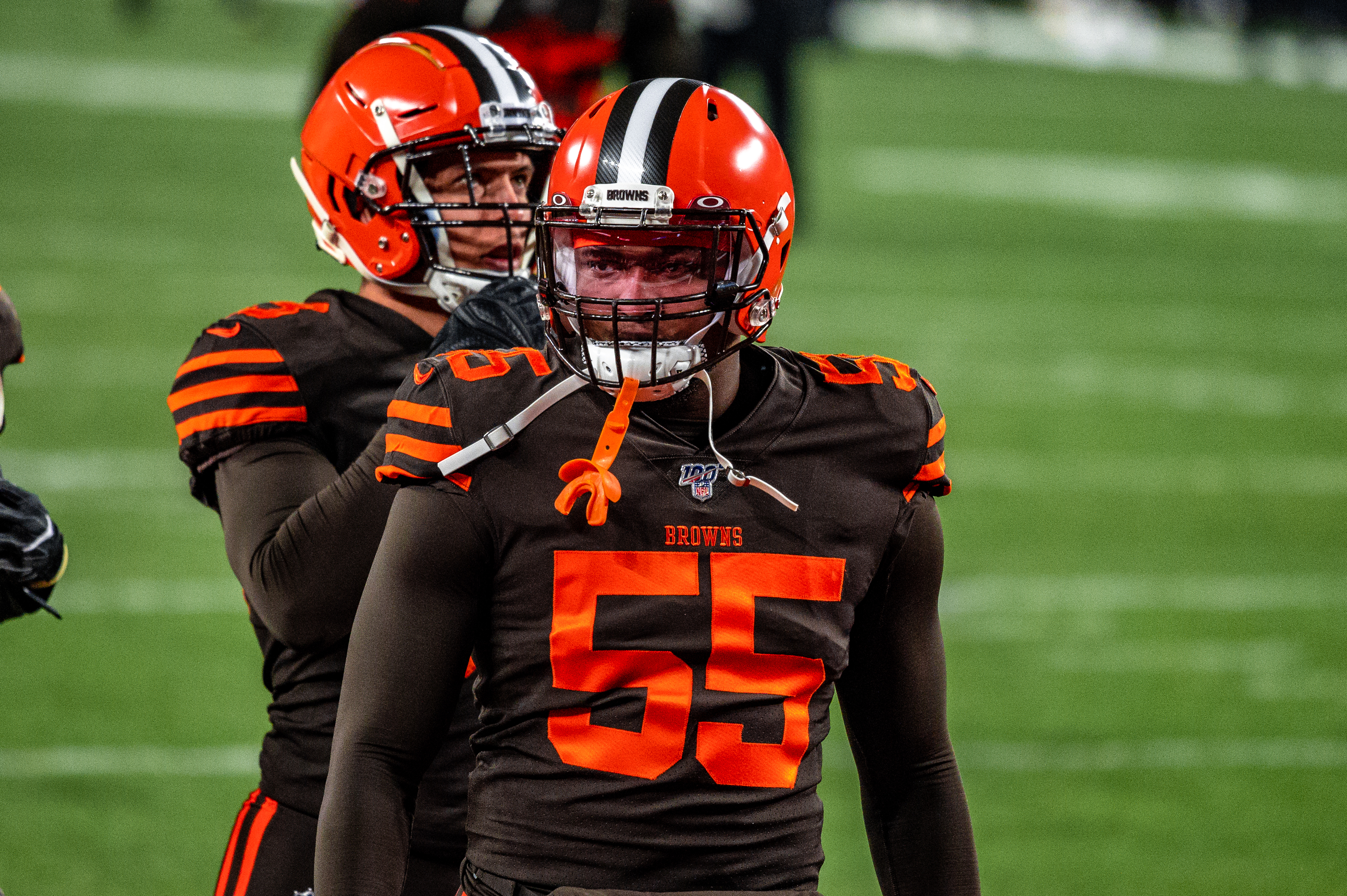
- Davis with the Cleveland Browns in 2019

Profile
- Position: Linebacker

Personal information
- Born: August 14, 1996 (age 30); Oxford, Alabama, U.S.
- Listed height: 6 ft 0 in (1.83 m)
- Listed weight: 222 lb (101 kg)

Career information
- High school: Oxford
- College: Chattanooga (2014–2017)
- NFL draft: 2018: undrafted

Career history
- New York Giants (2018–2019); Cleveland Browns (2019–2020); Houston Texans (2021); Las Vegas Raiders (2022)*; Cleveland Browns (2022); Atlanta Falcons (2023); Carolina Panthers (2023)
- * Offseason or practice squad member only

Career NFL statistics as of 2023
- Total tackles: 64
- Sacks: 2
- Pass deflections: 2
- Stats at Pro Football Reference

Octavious Marquez "Tae" Davis (born August 14, 1996) is an American professional football linebacker. He played college football at Chattanooga.

== College career ==
Davis played in 49 games for the University of Tennessee at Chattanooga. He was moved to outside linebacker for his senior season after playing his first three years as a safety.

== Professional career ==
Pre-draft measurables
Height	Weight	Arm length	Hand span	40-yard dash
6 ft 1 in (1.85 m)	216 lb (98 kg)	31 7/8 in (0.81 m)	8 1/4 in (0.21 m)	4.72 s
All values from Pro Day

=== New York Giants ===
Following the 2018 NFL draft, Davis was signed by the New York Giants as an undrafted free agent. On September 1, 2018, it was announced that Davis had made the Giants' 53-man roster.

On October 29, 2019, Davis was waived by the Giants.

=== Cleveland Browns (first stint) ===
Davis was claimed off waivers by the Cleveland Browns on October 30, 2019.

=== Houston Texans ===
On March 23, 2021, Davis signed with the Houston Texans. He was waived/injured on August 30, 2021, and placed on injured reserve.

On February 24, 2022, Davis re-signed with the Texans. He was released on August 21.

=== Las Vegas Raiders ===
On August 22, 2022, Davis signed with the Las Vegas Raiders.

On August 28, 2022, Davis was placed on injured reserve and then, on September 2, 2022, he was released by the Raiders.

=== Cleveland Browns (second stint) ===
On November 29, 2022, Davis was signed to the Browns practice squad. He was promoted to the active roster on December 31.

=== Atlanta Falcons ===
On March 17, 2023, Davis signed a one-year contract with the Atlanta Falcons. He was released on November 7.

=== Carolina Panthers ===
On November 14, 2023, Davis signed with the Carolina Panthers. He was placed on injured reserve on August 27, 2024, and released a week later.
