= Jawill Davis =

American football player (born 1995)

Profile
- Position: Wide receiver

Personal information
- Born: April 6, 1995 (age 31); Miami, Florida, U.S.
- Listed height: 6 ft 1 in (1.85 m)
- Listed weight: 191 lb (87 kg)

Career information
- High school: American (Miami)
- College: Bethune–Cookman
- NFL draft: 2018: undrafted

Career history
- New York Giants (2018); Green Bay Packers (2019)*; Winnipeg Blue Bombers (2019); Tampa Bay Vipers (2020)*; Toronto Argonauts (2020–2021)*; TSL Alphas (2021); Sioux Falls Storm (2022)
- * Offseason or practice squad member only

Awards and highlights
- First-team All-MEAC (2015)

Career NFL statistics
- Receptions: 4
- Receiving yards: 40
- Return yards: 260
- Stats at Pro Football Reference

Jawill Davis (born April 6, 1995) is an American football wide receiver and return specialist. He played college football at Bethune–Cookman.

== Early life ==
Davis attended and played high school football at American High School.

== College career ==
Davis played in 47 games (29 starts) for the Bethune–Cookman Wildcats over five seasons. As a redshirt sophomore, Davis caught 39 passes for 788 yards (20.2 yards per catch) with 6 touchdowns and garnered first-team All-MEAC honors. As a fifth-year senior, Davis was the team's leading receiver, catching 36 passes for 475 yards and three touchdowns.

== Professional career ==
=== New York Giants ===
Davis signed with the New York Giants as an undrafted free agent after going unselected in the 2018 NFL draft. He was cut by the Giants at the end of training camp and was subsequently signed to the team's practice squad the next day. Davis was promoted to the active roster on September 28 after running back Jonathan Stewart was placed on injured reserve.

Davis made his NFL debut on September 30 against the New Orleans Saints, returning three kicks for 60 yards. Davis caught his first career pass, a 22-yard reception, the following week against the Carolina Panthers. He suffered a dislocated kneecap while dancing in the Giants locker room on December 29, 2018 and was placed on injured reserve. Davis finished his rookie season with four receptions for 40 yards and 260 total return yards, averaging 7.4 yards on 12 punt returns and 24.4 yards on seven kickoff returns, in seven games played. He was waived on May 2, 2019.

=== Green Bay Packers ===
On May 7, 2019, Davis was claimed off waivers by the Green Bay Packers. He was released on August 10.

=== Winnipeg Blue Bombers ===
On September 24, 2019, Jawill Davis was added to the practice roster of the Winnipeg Blue Bombers of the Canadian Football League (CFL). Davis was released one week later on October 1, 2019.

=== Tampa Bay Vipers ===
Davis was selected by the Tampa Bay Vipers in the 2020 XFL Supplemental Draft. He was released during final roster cuts on January 22, 2020.

=== Toronto Argonauts ===
Davis signed with the Toronto Argonauts on February 17, 2020. After the CFL suspended its 2020 season due to the COVID-19 pandemic, Davis signed with the Alphas of The Spring League in May 2021. He was released by the Argonauts on June 18, 2021.

=== Sioux Falls Storm ===
Davis signed with the Sioux Falls Storm on December 20, 2021. On April 5, 2022, Davis was released by the Storm.
