= 2017 New York Giants season =

93rd season in franchise history

- Owner: John Mara; Steve Tisch
- General manager: Jerry Reese (fired week 13); Kevin Abrams (interim); Dave Gettleman (week 17)
- Head coach: Ben McAdoo (fired December 4, 2–10 record); Steve Spagnuolo (interim, 1–3 record)
- Home stadium: MetLife Stadium

Results
- Record: 3–13
- Division place: 4th NFC East
- Playoffs: Did not qualify
- Pro Bowlers: SS Landon Collins

Uniform
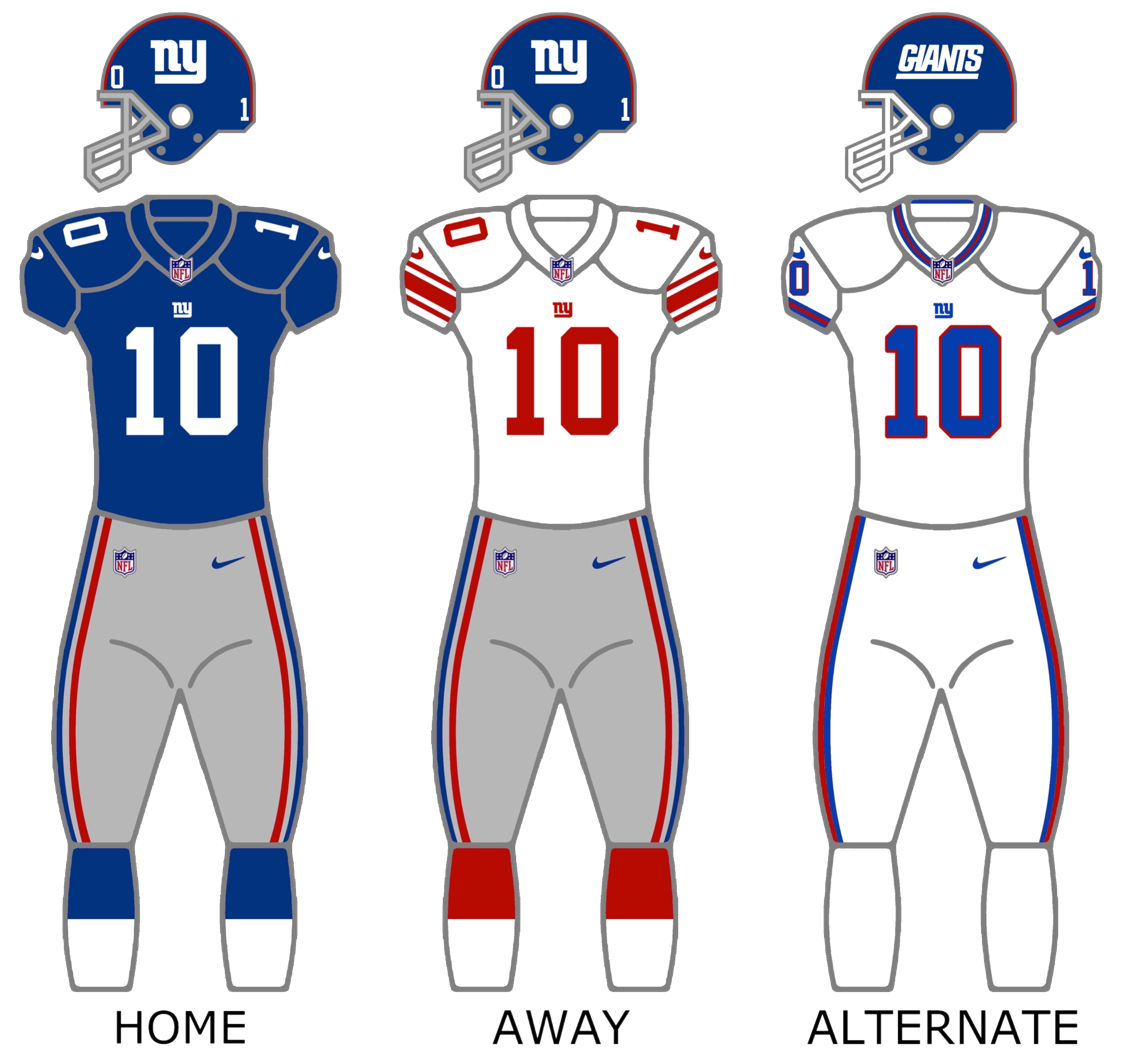

The 2017 season was the New York Giants' 93rd in the National Football League (NFL), their 42nd season playing in The Meadowlands, their 8th playing at MetLife Stadium and the second and final under head coach Ben McAdoo. Coming fresh off an 11–5 season, the Giants hoped to win a Super Bowl and were expected to be playoff contenders by many critics. However, things rapidly fell apart after key injuries, drama, and controversial decisions plagued the team. An 0–5 start to the season (their second in 5 years), coupled with major injuries to the team, including star wide receiver Odell Beckham Jr., had the Giants suffer a 3–13 record, their worst season in franchise history until that point. By Week 10, after losing to the previously winless San Francisco 49ers, the Giants were standing at 1–8, their worst record since 1980. The Giants were eliminated from playoff contention on November 26 with wins by the Atlanta Falcons, Carolina Panthers, and Seattle Seahawks, three days after their own loss to the Washington Redskins.

On November 28, it was announced that Geno Smith would start against the Oakland Raiders in Week 13, which snapped Eli Manning's 210 consecutive games started streak, the longest active streak in the NFL at the time. It started controversy, with present and former teammates, opponents, fans, executives, and television and radio show hosts coming to Manning's defense. The benching of Manning also led to speculation he would possibly join the Jacksonville Jaguars, which would reunite him with former Giants head coach Tom Coughlin, who at the time was Jacksonville's executive vice president of football operations. With the move, the Giants became the last team in the NFL to start an African-American quarterback in at least one game. After losing to the Raiders by a score of 24–17, and with the Giants standing at 2–10, both McAdoo and general manager Jerry Reese were fired, leaving defensive coordinator Steve Spagnuolo as the interim head coach and assistant general manager Kevin Abrams as the interim general manager. These were the Giants' first mid-season staff firings since the 1976 season. Manning was then renamed the starter for the Week 14 game against the Cowboys.

A 30–10 loss to the Dallas Cowboys in Week 14 dropped the Giants to 2–11, surpassing the most losses in the Eli Manning era with 10 losses (2004, 2014, and 2015). With a 34–29 loss to the Philadelphia Eagles in Week 15, the Giants tied their single season loss record with 12, and after a 23–0 loss to the Arizona Cardinals in Week 16, the Giants fell to 2–13, setting a new record for most losses in a single season in franchise history, eclipsing the previous record of 12, which had been done six times in franchise history: 1966, 1974, 1980, 1983, 2003 and later in 2019, and the worst under a 16-game schedule format. In their last game, the Giants defeated the Washington Redskins to ultimately finish the season at 3–13.

The Giants' 3–13 record was their worst record in a 16-game season in franchise history, their worst winning percentage since 1974, the worst record in the Eli Manning era, their worst record since 2003, finished last place in the NFC East for the first time since 2003, and second-worst in the league behind the Cleveland Browns. The Giants also went 1–11 against the NFC in 2017 and 1–5 against the NFC East. In the process, the Giants acquired the second pick of the 2018 NFL draft.

On December 29, 2017, Dave Gettleman was hired as the new general manager for the team. Gettleman quickly addressed the offensive line issues which led to the release of offensive tackle Bobby Hart and the benching of 2015 1st rounder Ereck Flowers. Flowers started all games to this point being the only consistent starter on the offensive line.

== Offseason ==
=== Free agents signed ===
Date	Position	Player	Free agent tag	2016 Team	New Team	Notes
March 8	WR	Brandon Marshall		New York Jets	New York Giants	
March 10	TE	Rhett Ellison		Minnesota Vikings	New York Giants	
March 12	G	D. J. Fluker		San Diego Chargers	New York Giants	
March 17	DE	Jason Pierre-Paul		New York Giants	New York Giants	
March 20	QB	Geno Smith		New York Jets	New York Giants	
March 20	CB	Valentino Blake		Tennessee Titans	New York Giants	
March 22	RB	Shaun Draughn		San Francisco 49ers	New York Giants	

== Draft ==
2017 New York Giants draft
Round	Pick	Player	Position	College	Notes
1	23	Evan Engram *	TE	Ole Miss	
2	55	Dalvin Tomlinson	DT	Alabama	
3	87	Davis Webb	QB	California	
4	140	Wayne Gallman	RB	Clemson	
5	167	Avery Moss	DE	Youngstown State	
6	200	Adam Bisnowaty	OT	Pittsburgh	
Made roster † Pro Football Hall of Fame * Made at least one Pro Bowl during career

Notes

- The Giants' original fourth-round selection was moved to the back of the fourth round, after all of the compensatory selections, but no more than 12 picks after where their pick would have been positioned, as part of the punishment for illegal use of a walkie-talkie on their sideline during week 14 of the 2016 season.

== Staff ==
2017 New York Giants staff
Front office: President/CEO – John Mara; Chairman/executive vice president – Steve Tisch; general manager – Dave Gettleman; Assistant general manager – Kevin Abrams; Senior vice president of player personnel – Chris Mara; Director of pro personnel – Ken Sternfeld; Director of player development – David Tyree; Head coaches: Head coach – Ben McAdoo; Interim head coach/defensive coordinator – Steve Spagnuolo; Offensive coaches: Offensive coordinator – Mike Sullivan; Quarterbacks – Frank Cignetti Jr.; Running backs – Craig Johnson; Wide receivers – Adam Henry; Tight ends – Kevin M. Gilbride; Offensive line – Mike Solari; Assistant offensive line – Lunda Wells; Offensive assistant – Ryan Roeder	Defensive coaches: Defensive line – Patrick Graham; Assistant defensive line – Rob Leonard; Linebackers – Bill McGovern; Secondary/cornerbacks – Tim Walton; Secondary/safeties – Dave Merritt; Defensive assistant – Bobby Blick; Special teams coaches: Special teams coordinator – Tom Quinn; Assistant special teams – Dwayne Stukes; Strength and conditioning: Strength and conditioning – Aaron Wellman; Assistant strength and conditioning – Markus Paul; Director of performance nutrition/assistant strength and conditioning – Pratik Patel; Performance manager – Joe Danos

== Final roster ==
2017 New York Giants roster
Quarterbacks (QB): 10 Eli Manning; 3 Geno Smith; 5 Davis Webb; Running backs (RB): 26 Orleans Darkwa; 22 Wayne Gallman; 28 Paul Perkins; 43 Shane Smith; 34 Shane Vereen; Wide receivers (WR): 86 Marquis Bundy; 18 Roger Lewis; 83 Kalif Raymond; 19 Travis Rudolph; 84 Hunter Sharp; 87 Sterling Shepard; Tight ends (TE): 89 Jerell Adams; 85 Rhett Ellison; 88 Evan Engram; 81 Ryan O'Malley	Offensive linemen (OL): 61 Nick Becton T; 66 Adam Bisnowaty T; 74 Ereck Flowers T; 73 John Greco T; 75 Jon Halapio G; 77 John Jerry G; 69 Brett Jones C/G; 71 Damien Mama G; 63 Chad Wheeler T; Defensive linemen (DL): 96 Jay Bromley DT; 98 Damon Harrison DT; 91 Avery Moss DE; 78 Romeo Okwara DE; 90 Jason Pierre-Paul DE; 99 Robert Thomas DT; 94 Dalvin Tomlinson DT; 54 Olivier Vernon DE; 72 Kerry Wynn DE	Linebackers (LB): 55 Ray-Ray Armstrong OLB; 48 Akeem Ayers OLB; 59 Devon Kennard OLB; 39 Derrick Mathews OLB; 46 Calvin Munson MLB; 47 Kelvin Sheppard MLB; Defensive backs (DB): 33 Andrew Adams SS; 29 Nat Berhe FS; 37 Ross Cockrell CB; 25 Brandon Dixon CB; 23 Darryl Morris CB; 36 Ryan Murphy SS; 41 Dominique Rodgers-Cromartie CB; 27 Darian Thompson FS; Special teams (ST): 51 Zak DeOssie LS; 2 Aldrick Rosas K; 9 Brad Wing P	Practice squad: 62 Ethan Cooper G; 6 Amba Etta-Tawo WR; 31 Jeremiah McKinnon CB; 30 Tim Scott CB; 8 Canaan Severin WR; 60 Kristjan Sokoli DT; 79 Jordan Williams DE; Reserve: 24 Eli Apple CB (Susp.); 64 Josh Banks DT (IR); 13 Odell Beckham Jr. WR (IR); 52 Jonathan Casillas OLB (IR); 21 Landon Collins SS (IR); 38 Donte Deayon CB (IR); 65 Jessamen Dunker G (IR); 76 D. J. Fluker G (IR); 93 B. J. Goodson MLB (IR); 58 Curtis Grant OLB (IR); 17 Dwayne Harris WR (IR); 44 Mark Herzlich OLB (IR); 20 Janoris Jenkins CB (IR); 82 Keeon Johnson WR (IR); 12 Tavarres King WR (IR); 15 Brandon Marshall WR (IR); 80 Darius Powe WR (IR); 67 Justin Pugh G/T (IR); 70 Weston Richburg C (IR); 57 Keenan Robinson OLB (IR); 45 Deontae Skinner OLB (IR); 97 Ishaq Williams DE (IR); Rookies in italics 53 active, 22 reserve, 7 practice squad

== Schedule ==
=== Preseason ===
Week	Date	Opponent	Result	Record	Venue	Recap
1	August 11	Pittsburgh Steelers	**L** 12–20	0–1	MetLife Stadium	Recap
2	August 21	at Cleveland Browns	**L** 6–10	0–2	FirstEnergy Stadium	Recap
3	August 26	New York Jets	**W** 32–31	1–2	MetLife Stadium	Recap
4	August 31	at New England Patriots	**W** 40–38	2–2	Gillette Stadium	Recap

=== Regular season ===
Week	Date	Opponent	Result	Record	Venue	Recap
1	September 10	at **Dallas Cowboys**	**L** 3–19	0–1	AT&T Stadium	Recap
2	September 18	Detroit Lions	**L** 10–24	0–2	MetLife Stadium	Recap
3	September 24	at **Philadelphia Eagles**	**L** 24–27	0–3	Lincoln Financial Field	Recap
4	October 1	at Tampa Bay Buccaneers	**L** 23–25	0–4	Raymond James Stadium	Recap
5	October 8	Los Angeles Chargers	**L** 22–27	0–5	MetLife Stadium	Recap
6	October 15	at Denver Broncos	**W** 23–10	1–5	Sports Authority Field at Mile High	Recap
7	October 22	Seattle Seahawks	**L** 7–24	1–6	MetLife Stadium	Recap
8	Bye					
9	November 5	Los Angeles Rams	**L** 17–51	1–7	MetLife Stadium	Recap
10	November 12	at San Francisco 49ers	**L** 21–31	1–8	Levi's Stadium	Recap
11	November 19	Kansas City Chiefs	**W** 12–9 (OT)	2–8	MetLife Stadium	Recap
12	November 23	at **Washington Redskins**	**L** 10–20	2–9	FedExField	Recap
13	December 3	at Oakland Raiders	**L** 17–24	2–10	Oakland–Alameda County Coliseum	Recap
14	December 10	**Dallas Cowboys**	**L** 10–30	2–11	MetLife Stadium	Recap
15	December 17	**Philadelphia Eagles**	**L** 29–34	2–12	MetLife Stadium	Recap
16	December 24	at Arizona Cardinals	**L** 0–23	2–13	University of Phoenix Stadium	Recap
17	December 31	**Washington Redskins**	**W** 18–10	3–13	MetLife Stadium	Recap

Note: Intra-division opponents are in bold text.

=== Game summaries ===
==== Week 1: at Dallas Cowboys ====
Week One: New York Giants at Dallas Cowboys – Game summary

Quarter	1	2	3	4	Total
Giants	0	0	3	0	**3**
**Cowboys**	3	13	0	3	**19**

at AT&T Stadium, Arlington, Texas

- Date: September 10
- Game time: 8:30 p.m. EDT/7:30 p.m. CDT
- Game weather: Played indoors (retractable roof closed)
- Game attendance: 93,183
- Referee: Carl Cheffers
- TV announcers (NBC): Al Michaels, Cris Collinsworth and Michele Tafoya
- Recap, Gamebook

Game information

**First quarter**

- DAL – Dan Bailey 21-yard field goal, 6:25. Cowboys 3–0. **Drive: 9 plays, 51 yards, 2:58.**

**Second quarter**

- DAL – Dan Bailey 48-yard field goal, 12:45. Cowboys 6–0. **Drive: 14 plays, 41 yards, 7:38.**
- DAL – Jason Witten 12-yard pass from Dak Prescott (Dan Bailey kick), 1:41. Cowboys 13–0. **Drive: 6 plays, 65 yards, 2:07.**
- DAL – Dan Bailey 42-yard field goal, 0:05. Cowboys 16–0. **Drive: 7 plays, 51 yards, 1:14.**

**Third quarter**

- NYG – Aldrick Rosas 25-yard field goal, 5:16. Cowboys 16–3. **Drive: 16 plays, 68 yards, 9:44.**

**Fourth quarter**

- DAL – Dan Bailey 36-yard field goal, 1:55. Cowboys 19–3. **Drive: 11 plays, 34 yards, 5:53.**

**Top passers**

- NYG – Eli Manning – 29/38, 220 yards, INT
- DAL – Dak Prescott – 24/39, 268 yards, TD

**Top rushers**

- NYG – Paul Perkins – 7 rushes, 16 yards
- DAL – Ezekiel Elliott – 24 rushes, 104 yards

**Top receivers**

- NYG – Roger Lewis – 4 receptions, 54 yards
- DAL – Terrance Williams – 6 receptions, 68 yards

**Top tacklers**

- NYG –
- DAL –

Odell Beckham Jr. was declared out before the game due to his ankle injury. The loss of Beckham was too steep for the Giants to overcome who barely mustered 200 yards. The Cowboys set the pace early and were on the field for 47 plays in the first half. The loss dropped the Giants to 0–1. They fell to 1–9 in Week 1 games against the Cowboys, with their only win coming in 2016.

==== Week 2: vs. Detroit Lions ====
Week Two: Detroit Lions at New York Giants – Game summary

Quarter	1	2	3	4	Total
**Lions**	7	10	0	7	**24**
Giants	0	7	3	0	**10**

at MetLife Stadium, East Rutherford, New Jersey

- Date: September 18
- Game time: 8:30 pm. EDT
- Game weather: 72 °F (22 °C), cloudy
- Game attendance: 77,004
- Referee: John Parry
- TV announcers (ESPN): Sean McDonough, Jon Gruden and Lisa Salters
- Recap, Gamebook

Game information

**First quarter**

- DET – Marvin Jones 27-yard pass from Matthew Stafford (Matt Prater kick). Lions 7–0. **Drive: 9 plays, 54 yards, 5:43.**

**Second quarter**

- NYG – Evan Engram 18-yard pass from Eli Manning (Aldrick Rosas kick). Tied 7–7. **Drive: 8 plays, 75 yards, 4:05.**
- DET – Eric Ebron 7-yard pass from Matthew Stafford (Matt Prater kick). Lions 14–7. **Drive: 5 plays, 29 yards, 2:52.**
- DET – Matt Prater 56-yard field goal. Lions 17–7. **Drive: 6 plays, 37 yards, 2:29.**

**Third quarter**

- NYG – Aldrick Rosas 25-yard field goal. Lions 17–10. **Drive: 10 plays, 68 yards, 5:45.**

**Fourth quarter**

- DET – Jamal Agnew 88-yard punt return (Matt Prater kick). Lions 24–10. **Drive: 3 plays, 9 yards, 1:45.**

**Top passers**

- DET – Matthew Stafford – 15/21, 122 yards, 2 TD
- NYG – Eli Manning – 22/32, 239 yards, TD, INT

**Top rushers**

- DET – Ameer Abdullah – 17 carries, 86 yards
- NYG – Shane Vereen – 6 carries, 28 yards

**Top receivers**

- DET – Eric Ebron – 5 receptions, 42 yards, TD
- NYG – Evan Engram – 4 receptions, 49 yards, TD

**Top tacklers**

- DET – Darius Slay – 6 tackles, 2 assists
- NYG – Dominique Rodgers-Cromartie – 8 tackles, 3 assists

Even with a limited Odell Beckham Jr., the Giants struggled mightily against the Lions. Rookie tight end Evan Engram scored his first career touchdown. However, an 88-yard punt return touchdown sealed the Giants' fate. With the loss, the Giants dropped to 0–2.

==== Week 3: at Philadelphia Eagles ====
Week Three: New York Giants at Philadelphia Eagles – Game summary

Quarter	1	2	3	4	Total
Giants	0	0	0	24	**24**
**Eagles**	0	7	7	13	**27**

at Lincoln Financial Field, Philadelphia, Pennsylvania

- Date: September 24
- Game time: 1:00 pm. EDT
- Game weather: 89 °F (32 °C), sunny
- Game attendance: 69,596
- Referee: Jerome Boger
- TV announcers (Fox): Joe Buck, Troy Aikman and Erin Andrews
- Recap, Gamebook

Game information

**First quarter**

- No Scoring

**Second quarter**

- PHI - LeGarrette Blount 1-yard rush (Jake Elliott kick), 9:29. Eagles 7–0. **Drive: 18 plays, 90 yards, 9:34**

**Third quarter**

- PHI - Zach Ertz 3-yard pass from Carson Wentz (Jake Elliott kick), 5:15. Eagles 14–0. **Drive: 7 plays, 18 yards, 3:43**

**Fourth quarter**

- NYG - Odell Beckham Jr. 10-yard pass from Eli Manning (Aldrick Rosas kick), 12:39. Eagles 14–7. **Drive: 5 plays, 55 yards, 2:10**
- NYG - Odell Beckham Jr. 4-yard pass from Eli Manning (Aldrick Rosas kick), 10:53. Tie 14–14. **Drive: 4 plays, 33 yards, 1:20**
- NYG - Sterling Shepard 77-yard pass from Eli Manning (Aldrick Rosas kick), 7:12. Giants 21–14. **Drive: 2 plays, 78 yards, 0:40**
- PHI - Corey Clement 15-yard rush (Jake Elliott kick), 5:40. Tie 21–21. **Drive: 4 plays, 39 yards, 1:32**
- NYG - Aldrick Rosas 41-yard field goal, 3:08. Giants 24–21. **Drive: 7 plays, 39 yards, 2:32**
- PHI - Jake Elliott 46-yard field goal, 0:51. Tie 24–24. **Drive: 8 plays, 62 yards, 2:17**
- PHI - Jake Elliott 61-yard field goal, 0:00. Eagles 27–24. **Drive: 3 plays, 19 yards, 0:13**

**Top passers**

- NYG – Eli Manning: 35/47, 366 yards, 3 TD, 2 INT
- PHI – Carson Wentz: 21/31, 176 yards, TD

**Top rushers**

- NYG – Orleans Darkwa: 7 rushes, 22 yards
  Paul Perkins: 9 rushes, 22 yards
- PHI – Wendell Smallwood: 12 rushes, 71 yards

**Top receivers**

- NYG – Sterling Shepard: 7 receptions, 133 yards, TD
- PHI – Alshon Jeffery: 4 receptions, 56 yards

**Top tacklers**

- NYG – Keenan Robinson: 7 tackles, 3 assists
- PHI – Jalen Mills: 9 tackles, 3 assists

Trailing 14–0 entering the 4th quarter, the Giants mounted a huge rally scoring three touchdowns on three consecutive drives, taking a 21–14 lead. However, their rally was overshadowed by rookie kicker Jake Elliott when he kicked a game winning 61-yard field goal to drop the Giants to 0–3 and their fourth straight loss in Philadelphia. It was the longest game winning field goal as time expired since 2006.

==== Week 4: at Tampa Bay Buccaneers ====
Week Four: New York Giants at Tampa Bay Buccaneers – Game summary

Quarter	1	2	3	4	Total
Giants	0	10	7	6	**23**
**Buccaneers**	13	3	0	9	**25**

at Raymond James Stadium, Tampa, Florida

- Date: October 1
- Game time: 4:05 pm. EDT
- Game weather: 91 °F (33 °C), cloudy
- Game attendance: 63,916
- Referee: Craig Wrolstad
- TV announcers (Fox): Kenny Albert, Ronde Barber and Kristina Pink
- Recap, Gamebook

Game information

**First quarter**

- TB – Mike Evans 6-yard pass from Jameis Winston (Nick Folk kick), 7:47. Buccaneers 7–0. **Drive: 4 plays, 56 yards, 2:01.**
- TB – O. J. Howard 58-yard pass from Jameis Winston (kick failed), 3:00. Buccaneers 13–0. **Drive: 2 plays, 70 yards, 0:45.**

**Second quarter**

- NYG – Aldrick Rosas 30-yard field goal, 7:17. Buccaneers 13–3. **Drive: 11 plays, 52 yards, 4:36.**
- NYG – Eli Manning 14-yard run (Aldrick Rosas kick), 3:17. Buccaneers 13–10. **Drive: 7 plays, 62 yards, 3:12.**
- TB – Nick Folk 20-yard field goal, 0:32. Buccaneers 16–10. **Drive: 12 plays, 73 yards, 2:45.**

**Third quarter**

- NYG – Wayne Gallman 4-yard pass from Eli Manning (Aldrick Rosas kick), 4:19. Giants 17–16. **Drive: 11 plays, 61 yards, 5:51.**

**Fourth quarter**

- TB – Cameron Brate 14-yard pass from Jameis Winston (pass failed), 7:44. Buccaneers 22–17. **Drive: 4 plays, 57 yards, 1:41.**
- NYG – Rhett Ellison 2-yard pass from Eli Manning (pass failed), 3:16. Giants 23–22. **Drive: 10 plays, 75 yards, 4:28.**
- TB – Nick Folk 34-yard field goal, 0:00. Buccaneers 25–22. **Drive: 9 plays, 59 yards, 3:16.**

**Top passers**

- NYG – Eli Manning – 30/49, 288 yards, 2 TD
- TB – Jameis Winston – 22/38, 332 yards, 3 TD

**Top rushers**

- NYG – Wayne Gallman – 11 carries, 42 yards
- TB – Jacquizz Rodgers – 16 carries, 83 yards

**Top receivers**

- NYG – Odell Beckham Jr. – 7 receptions, 90 yards
- TB – Adam Humphries – 6 receptions, 70 yards

**Top tacklers**

- NYG –
- TB –

While Manning led the Giants on a game-leading drive late in the 4th quarter, the defense could not get off the field, and for the second consecutive week, the Giants lost on a game winning field goal to drop to 0–4.

==== Week 5: vs. Los Angeles Chargers ====
Week Five: Los Angeles Chargers at New York Giants – Game summary

Quarter	1	2	3	4	Total
**Chargers**	0	10	7	10	**27**
Giants	9	0	7	6	**22**

at MetLife Stadium, East Rutherford, New Jersey

- Date: October 8
- Game time: 1:00 pm. EDT
- Game weather: 76 °F (24 °C), cloudy
- Game attendance: 77,373
- Referee: Jeff Triplette
- TV announcers (CBS): Ian Eagle, Dan Fouts and Evan Washburn
- Recap, Gamebook

Game information

**First quarter**

- NYG – Spencer Pulley fumble out of bounds in end zone for a Safety, 8:53. Giants 2–0.
- NYG – Orleans Darkwa 23-yard run (Aldrick Rosas kick), 2:16. Giants 9–0. **Drive: 5 plays, 64 yards, 2:19.**

**Second quarter**

- LAC – Melvin Gordon 6-yard pass from Philip Rivers (Nick Novak kick), 13:01. Giants 9–7. **Drive: 8 plays, 77 yards, 4:15.**
- LAC – Nick Novak 20-yard field goal, 0:06. Chargers 10–9. **Drive: 12 plays, 49 yards, 2:36.**

**Third quarter**

- NYG – Roger Lewis 29-yard pass from Eli Manning (Aldrick Rosas kick), 6:46. Giants 16–10. **Drive: 9 plays, 80 yards, 4:10.**
- LAC – Hunter Henry 25-yard pass from Philip Rivers (Nick Novak kick), 0:40. Chargers 17–16. **Drive: 12 plays, 92 yards, 6:06.**

**Fourth quarter**

- NYG – Odell Beckham Jr. 48-yard pass from Eli Manning (pass failed), 13:31. Giants 22–17. **Drive: 5 plays, 75 yards, 2:09.**
- LAC – Nick Novak 31-yard field goal, 4:50. Giants 22–20. **Drive: 11 plays, 48 yards, 4:15.**
- LAC – Melvin Gordon 10-yard pass from Philip Rivers (Nick Novak kick), 2:58. Chargers 27–22. **Drive: 3 plays, 11 yards, 0:48.**

**Top passers**

- LAC – Philipp Rivers – 21/44, 258 yards, 3 TD, INT
- NYG – Eli Manning – 21/36, 225 yards, 2 TD, INT

**Top rushers**

- LAC – Melvin Gordon – 20 carries, 105 yards
- NYG – Orleans Darkwa – 8 carries, 69 yards, TD

**Top receivers**

- LAC – Melvin Gordon – 6 receptions, 58 yards, 2 TD
- NYG – Odell Beckham Jr. – 5 receptions, 97 yards, TD

**Top tacklers**

- LAC –
- NYG –

The Giants suffered a ton of injuries throughout the game including star wide receiver Odell Beckham Jr. It was later revealed he broke his ankle. The Giants blew their third consecutive 4th quarter lead and dropped to 0–5 for the first time since 2013. This was their fourth straight loss to the Chargers as Eli Manning's Giants never beat the team that drafted him 1st overall and sent him to the Giants in exchange for Philip Rivers in the 2004 draft. The Giants have not beaten the Chargers since 1998.

==== Week 6: at Denver Broncos ====
Week Six: New York Giants at Denver Broncos – Game summary

Quarter	1	2	3	4	Total
**Giants**	3	14	3	3	**23**
Broncos	0	3	0	7	**10**

at Sports Authority Field at Mile High, Denver, Colorado

- Date: October 15
- Game time: 8:30 pm. EDT/6:30 p.m. MDT
- Game weather: 61 °F (16 °C), clear
- Game attendance: 76,721
- Referee: Bill Vinovich
- TV announcers (NBC): Al Michaels, Cris Collinsworth and Michele Tafoya
- Recap, Gamebook

Game information

**First quarter**

- NYG – Aldrick Rosas 25-yard field goal, 6:54. Giants 3–0. **Drive: 13 plays, 69 yards, 7:02.**

**Second quarter**

- NYG – Evan Engram 5-yard pass from Eli Manning (Aldrick Rosas kick), 12:30. Giants 10–0. **Drive: 7 plays, 75 yards, 3:23.**
- DEN – Brandon McManus 28-yard field goal, 4:21. Giants 10–3. **Drive: 9 plays, 70 yards, 3:06.**
- NYG – Janoris Jenkins 43-yard interception return (Aldrick Rosas kick), 0:48. Giants 17–3.

**Third quarter**

- NYG – Aldrick Rosas 51-yard field goal, 8:08. Giants 20–3. **Drive: 6 plays, 30 yards, 2:45.**

**Fourth quarter**

- DEN – Jeff Heuerman 13-yard pass from Trevor Siemian (Brandon McManus kick), 4:07. Giants 20–10. **Drive: 7 plays, 58 yards, 2:03.**
- NYG – Aldrick Rosas 40-yard field goal, 0:27. Giants 23–10. **Drive: 7 plays, 19 yards, 3:40.**

**Top passers**

- NYG – Eli Manning – 11/19, 128 yards, TD
- DEN – Trevor Siemian – 29/50, 376 yards, TD, 2 INT

**Top rushers**

- NYG – Orleans Darkwa – 21 rushes, 117 yards
- DEN – Jamaal Charles – 5 rushes, 19 yards

**Top receivers**

- NYG – Evan Ingram – 5 receptions, 82 yards, TD
- DEN – Demaryius Thomas – 10 receptions, 133 yards

With numerous injuries in the receiving core from the Week 5 game and against a heavily favored Broncos team, the Giants won their first game of the season to snap a 5-game losing streak and defeat the Broncos for the first time since 2005. Janoris Jenkins returned a Trevor Siemian interception for a touchdown in the win, his first as a member of the Giants, and the defense had a goal line stand early in the 4th quarter to seal the game.

Orleans Darkwa had his first 100-yard game.

==== Week 7: vs. Seattle Seahawks ====
Week Seven: Seattle Seahawks at New York Giants – Game summary

Quarter	1	2	3	4	Total
**Seahawks**	0	3	7	14	**24**
Giants	0	7	0	0	**7**

at MetLife Stadium, East Rutherford, New Jersey

- Date: October 22
- Game time: 4:25 pm. EDT
- Game weather: 75 °F (24 °C), partly cloudy
- Game attendance: 78,527
- Referee: Tony Corrente
- TV announcers (CBS): Andrew Catalon and James Lofton
- Recap, Gamebook

Game information

**First quarter**

- No scoring plays

**Second quarter**

- NYG – Evan Engram 5-yard pass from Eli Manning (Aldrick Rosas kick), 11:51. Giants 7–0. **Drive: 2 plays, 17 yards, 0:42.**
- SEA – Blair Walsh 39-yard field goal, 0:42. Giants 7–3. **Drive: 8 plays, 49 yards, 1:57.**

**Third quarter**

- SEA – Doug Baldwin 22-yard pass from Russell Wilson (Blair Walsh kick), 7:30. Seahawks 10–7. **Drive: 4 plays, 59 yards, 1:17.**

**Fourth quarter**

- SEA – Paul Richardson 38-yard pass from Russell Wilson (Blair Walsh kick), 9:34. Seahawks 17–7. **Drive: 1 play, 38 yards, 0:15.**
- SEA – Jimmy Graham 1-yard pass from Russell Wilson (Blair Walsh kick), 2:14. Seahawks 24–7. **Drive: 12 plays, 50 yards, 5:56.**

**Top passers**

- SEA – Russell Wilson – 27/39, 334 yards, 3 TD
- NYG – Eli Manning – 19/39, 134 yards, TD

**Top rushers**

- SEA – Thomas Rawls – 11 rushes, 36 yards
- NYG – Orleans Darkwa – 9 rushes, 35 yards

**Top receivers**

- SEA – Doug Baldwin – 9 receptions, 92 yards, TD
- NYG – Evan Engram – 6 receptions, 60 yards, TD

**Top tacklers**

- SEA – K. J. Wright – 6 solo tackles, 5 assisted
- NYG – Keenan Robinson – 6 solo tackles, 3 assisted

This game was the first time the Giants played an intraconference game on CBS since the 1993 season finale against the Dallas Cowboys (before Fox took over the NFC contract in the 1994 season). The Giants defense played well in the first half, aided by an NFL record 10-play goal line stand, but unraveled in the second half as they tired out. They could not be saved by their weak wide receiving corps, along with a struggling run game that sealed their fate. With the loss, the Giants fell to 1–6 and lost to the Seahawks for the fourth straight time.

==== Week 9: vs. Los Angeles Rams ====
Week Nine: Los Angeles Rams at New York Giants – Game summary

Quarter	1	2	3	4	Total
**Rams**	7	20	21	3	**51**
Giants	7	3	0	7	**17**

at MetLife Stadium, East Rutherford, New Jersey

- Date: November 5
- Game time: 1:00 pm. EST
- Game weather: 56 °F (13 °C), cloudy
- Game attendance: 76,877
- Referee: Ed Hochuli
- TV announcers (Fox): Kenny Albert, Ronde Barber and Kristina Pink
- Recap, Gamebook

Game information

**First quarter**

- LAR – Tyler Higbee 8-yard pass from Jared Goff (Greg Zuerlein kick), 11:03. Rams 7–0. **Drive: 4 plays, 52 yards, 1:50.**
- NYG – Tavarres King 5-yard pass from Eli Manning (Aldrick Rosas kick), 3:22. Tied 7–7. **Drive: 14 plays, 67 yards, 7:39.**

**Second quarter**

- LAR – Greg Zuerlein 27-yard field goal, 14:55. Rams 10–7. **Drive: 9 plays, 66 yards, 3:24.**
- LAR – Robert Woods 52-yard pass from Jared Goff (Greg Zuerlein kick), 9:39. Rams 17–7. **Drive: 6 plays, 50 yards, 3:35.**
- LAR – Sammy Watkins 67-yard pass from Jared Goff (Greg Zuerlein kick), 7:28. Rams 24–7. **Drive: 2 plays, 71 yards, 0:35.**
- NYG – Aldrick Rosas 50-yard field goal, 4:06. Rams 24–10. **Drive: 8 plays, 44 yards, 3:17.**
- LAR – Greg Zuerlein 46-yard field goal, 1:18. Rams 27–10. **Drive: 4 plays, 2 yards, 1:21.**

**Third quarter**

- LAR – Todd Gurley 1-yard run (Greg Zuerlein kick), 11:42. Rams 34–10. **Drive: 7 plays, 75 yards, 3:26.**
- LAR – Robert Woods 4-yard pass from Jared Goff (Greg Zuerlein kick), 6:34. Rams 41–10. **Drive: 4 plays, 45 yards, 1:30.**
- LAR – Todd Gurley 4-yard run (Greg Zuerlein kick), 3:34. Rams 48–10. **Drive: 3 plays, 18 yards, 1:26.**

**Fourth quarter**

- NYG – Evan Engram 10-yard pass from Eli Manning (Aldrick Rosas kick), 9:40. Rams 48–17. **Drive: 6 plays, 72 yards, 3:00.**
- LAR – Greg Zuerlein 47-yard field goal, 3:03. Rams 51–17. **Drive: 10 plays, 46 yards, 6:40.**

**Top passers**

- LAR – Jared Goff – 14/22, 311 yards, 4 TD
- NYG – Eli Manning – 20/36, 220 yards, 2 TD, INT

**Top rushers**

- LAR – Todd Gurley – 16 rushes, 59 yards, 2 TD
- NYG – Orleans Darkwa – 16 rushes, 71 yards

**Top receivers**

- LAR – Robert Woods – 4 receptions, 70 yards, 2 TD
- NYG – Evan Engram – 4 receptions, 70 yards, TD

**Top tacklers**

- LAR –
- NYG –

The Giants started 1–7 for the first time since 1980 with the loss. The Rams dominated the entire game and were aided by a bunch of Giants miscues and three turnovers from the offense. The Giants allowed 51 points, the most points allowed at home since 1964 against the Cleveland Browns. This was their first loss to the Rams since 2001 and their first home loss to the Rams since 2000. After the game, media outlets and sports reporters questioned the efforts of several players, and speculated head coach Ben McAdoo was on the hot seat for losing the Giants locker room.

Despite all the miscues, Eli Manning became the seventh quarterback in NFL history to reach 50,000 career passing yards.

==== Week 10: at San Francisco 49ers ====
Week Ten: New York Giants at San Francisco 49ers – Game summary

Quarter	1	2	3	4	Total
Giants	6	7	0	8	**21**
**49ers**	3	14	0	14	**31**

at Levi's Stadium, Santa Clara, California

- Date: November 12
- Game time: 4:25 pm. EST/1:25 p.m. PST
- Game weather: 68 °F (20 °C), sunny
- Game attendance: 70,133
- Referee: Jerome Boger
- TV announcers (Fox): Chris Myers, Daryl Johnston and Laura Okmin
- Recap, Gamebook

Game information

**First quarter**

- SF – Robbie Gould 43-yard field goal, 12:44. 49ers 3–0. **Drive: 5 plays, 35 yards, 2:20.**
- NYG – Aldrick Rosas 47-yard field goal, 7:28. Tied 3–3. **Drive: 10 plays, 46 yards, 5:17.**
- NYG – Aldrick Rosas 42-yard field goal, 1:11. Giants 6–3. **Drive: 6 plays, 40 yards, 2:27.**

**Second quarter**

- SF – Marquise Goodwin 83-yard pass from C. J. Beathard (Robbie Gould kick), 8:10. 49ers 10–6. **Drive: 3 plays, 85 yards, 2:01.**
- NYG – Evan Engram 9-yard pass from Eli Manning (Aldrick Rosas kick), 2:13. Giants 13–10. **Drive: 10 plays, 75 yards, 5:51.**
- SF – Garrett Celek 47-yard pass from C. J. Beathard (Robbie Gould kick), 0:37. 49ers 17–13. **Drive: 6 plays, 76 yards, 1:40.**

**Third quarter**

- No scoring plays.

**Fourth quarter**

- SF – C. J. Beathard 11-yard run (Robbie Gould kick), 15:00. 49ers 24–13. **Drive: 11 plays, 61 yards, 5:46.**
- SF – Matt Breida 33-yard run (Robbie Gould kick), 9:27. 49ers 31–13. **Drive: 6 plays, 62 yards, 3:32.**
- NYG – Roger Lewis 14-yard pass from Eli Manning (Orleans Darkwa run), 1:07. 49ers 31–21. **Drive: 15 plays, 90 yards, 4:34.**

**Top passers**

- NYG – Eli Manning – 28/37, 273 yards, 2 TD
- SF – C. J. Beathard – 19/25, 288 yards, 2 TD, INT

**Top rushers**

- NYG – Orleans Darkwa – 14 rushes, 70 yards
- SF – Carlos Hyde – 17 rushes, 98 yards

**Top receivers**

- NYG – Sterling Shepard – 11 receptions, 142 yards
- SF – Marquise Goodwin – 1 reception, 83 yards, TD

**Top tacklers**

- NYG –
- SF –

Attempting to get their second win of the season, the Giants were upset by the previously winless 49ers. Their defense was porous, allowing over 450 yards total offense. Opposing quarterback C. J. Beathard, who entered the game with an 0–4 record and hadn't finished with a passer rating higher than 77, finished with 303 total yards, 3 touchdowns, and a 123.4 passer rating.

Despite the loss, Eli Manning had his 208th consecutive start at quarterback, tying his brother for 2nd in NFL history.

Eli Manning's first touchdown pass to Evan Engram in the second quarter was the Giants 3,000th regular season touchdown in franchise history.

==== Week 11: vs. Kansas City Chiefs ====
Week Eleven: Kansas City Chiefs at New York Giants – Game summary

Quarter	1	2	3	4	OT	Total
Chiefs	0	3	0	6	0	**9**
**Giants**	0	6	0	3	3	**12**

at MetLife Stadium, East Rutherford, New Jersey

- Date: November 19
- Game time: 1:00 pm. EST
- Game weather: 50 °F (10 °C), mostly cloudy
- Game attendance: 76,363
- Referee: Brad Allen
- TV announcers (CBS): Ian Eagle, Dan Fouts and Evan Washburn
- Recap, Gamebook

Game information

**First quarter**

- No scoring plays.

**Second quarter**

- NYG – Orleans Darkwa 1-yard run (kick failed), 13:26. Giants 6–0. **Drive: 6 plays, 26 yards, 2:17.**
- KC – Harrison Butker 31-yard field goal, 4:09. Giants 6–3. **Drive: 15 plays, 61 yards, 9:17.**

**Third quarter**

- No scoring plays.

**Fourth quarter**

- KC – Harrison Butker 31-yard field goal, 13:30. Tied 6–6. **Drive: 7 plays, 54 yards, 3:05.**
- NYG – Aldrick Rosas 26-yard field goal, 1:38. Giants 9–6. **Drive: 5 plays, 15 yards, 0:29.**
- KC – Harrison Butker 23-yard field goal, 0:01. Tied 9–9. **Drive: 9 plays, 69 yards, 1:37.**

**Overtime**

- NYG – Aldrick Rosas 23-yard field goal, 1:54. Giants 12–9. **Drive: 10 plays, 77 yards, 4:00.**

**Top passers**

- KC – Alex Smith – 27/40, 230 yards, 2 INT
- NYG – Eli Manning – 19/35, 205 yards

**Top rushers**

- KC – Kareem Hunt – 18 carries, 73 yards
- NYG – Orleans Darkwa – 20 carries, 74 yards, TD

**Top receivers**

- KC – Travis Kelce – 8 receptions, 109 yards
- NYG – Roger Lewis – 5 receptions, 55 yards

**Top tacklers**

- KC –
- NYG –

Attempting to stop a 3-game losing streak, the Giants returned home to host the Kansas City Chiefs led by Alex Smith and Kareem Hunt. In a defensive battle, the Giants intercepted the Chiefs three times and Roger Lewis made a 4th and 6 catch in the red zone to set up Aldrick Rosas' game-winning field goal in overtime to improve the Giants to 2–8. This was the Giants' first home win of the season.

Eli Manning made his 209th consecutive start at quarterback, passing Peyton Manning for 2nd in NFL history, only trailing Brett Favre (297).

==== Week 12: at Washington Redskins ====
NFL on Thanksgiving Day

Week Twelve: New York Giants at Washington Redskins – Game summary

Quarter	1	2	3	4	Total
Giants	0	3	7	0	**10**
**Redskins**	0	3	7	10	**20**

at FedExField, Landover, Maryland

- Date: November 23
- Game time: 8:30 pm. EST
- Game weather: 33 °F (1 °C), clear
- Game attendance: 73,210
- Referee: Terry McAulay
- TV announcers (NBC): Al Michaels, Cris Collinsworth and Michele Tafoya
- Recap, Gamebook

Game information

**First quarter**

- No scoring plays.

**Second quarter**

- NYG – Aldrick Rosas 30-yard field goal, 4:00. Giants 3–0. **Drive: 16 plays, 60 yards, 8:29.**
- WAS – Nick Rose 28-yard field goal, 0:13. Tied 3–3. **Drive: 4 plays, 38 yards, 0:51.**

**Third quarter**

- WAS – Jamison Crowder 15-yard pass from Kirk Cousins (Nick Rose kick), 6:32. Redskins 10–3. **Drive: 6 plays, 50 yards, 3:31.**
- NYG – Janoris Jenkins 53-yard interception return (Aldrick Rosas kick), 2:52. Tied 10–10.

**Fourth quarter**

- WAS – Josh Doctson 14-yard pass from Kirk Cousins (Nick Rose kick), 3:31. Redskins 17–10. **Drive: 8 plays, 60 yards, 5:02.**
- WAS – Nick Rose 33-yard field goal, 1:49. Redskins 20–10. **Drive: 4 plays, 4 yards, 0:23.**

**Top passers**

- NYG – Eli Manning – 13/27, 113 yards, INT
- WAS – Kirk Cousins – 19/31, 242 yards, 2 TD, INT

**Top rushers**

- NYG – Wayne Gallman – 9 carries, 37 yards
- WAS – Samaje Perine – 24 carries, 100 yards

**Top receivers**

- NYG – Roger Lewis – 3 receptions, 26 yards
- WAS – Jamison Crowder – 7 receptions, 141 yards, TD

**Top tacklers**

- NYG –
- WAS –

The Giants offense struggled the entire game and was held to only one first down in the second half. As he would be benched the next week, Eli Manning's streak of 210 consecutive starts by a quarterback ended 2nd in NFL history and is currently 3rd, having since been passed by Philip Rivers.

With the loss, the New York Giants dropped to 2–9. A Seattle Seahawks win over the San Francisco 49ers three days later eliminated the Giants from playoff contention.

==== Week 13: at Oakland Raiders ====
Week Thirteen: New York Giants at Oakland Raiders – Game summary

Quarter	1	2	3	4	Total
Giants	7	0	0	10	**17**
**Raiders**	7	3	0	14	**24**

at Oakland–Alameda County Coliseum, Oakland, California

- Date: December 3
- Game time: 4:25 pm. EST/1:25 pm. PST
- Game weather: 58 °F (14 °C), sunny
- Game attendance: 54,994
- Referee: Pete Morelli
- TV announcers (Fox): Kenny Albert, Ronde Barber and Kristina Pink
- Recap, Gamebook

Game information

**First quarter**

- OAK – Marshawn Lynch 51-yard run (Giorgio Tavecchio kick), 12:26. Raiders 7–0. **Drive: 3 plays, 60 yards, 1:31.**
- NYG – Orleans Darkwa 1-yard run (Aldrick Rosas kick), 0:06. Tied 7–7. **Drive: 11 plays, 74 yards, 5:16.**

**Second quarter**

- OAK – Giorgio Tavecchio 39-yard field goal, 3:37. Raiders 10–7. **Drive: 12 plays 47 yards, 5:16.**

**Third quarter**

- No scoring plays.

**Fourth quarter**

- OAK – DeAndré Washington 9-yard run (Giorgio Tavecchio kick), 10:18. Raiders 17–7. **Drive: 8 plays, 79 yards, 4:42.**
- NYG – Evan Engram 10-yard pass from Geno Smith (Aldrick Rosas kick), 5:16. Raiders 17–14. **Drive: 9 plays, 88 yards, 5:02.**
- OAK – Johnny Holton 9-yard pass from Derek Carr (Giorgio Tavecchio kick), 3:23. Raiders 24–14. **Drive: 4 plays, 68 yards, 1:53.**
- NYG – Aldrick Rosas 52-yard field goal, 1:38. Raiders 24–17. **Drive: 9 plays, 46 yards, 1:45.**

**Top passers**

- NYG – Geno Smith 21/34, 212 yards, 1 TD
- OAK – Derek Carr 22/36, 287 yards, 1 TD

**Top rushers**

- NYG – Orleans Darkwa 14 rushes, 32 yards, 1 TD
- OAK – Marshawn Lynch 17 rushes, 101 yards, 1 TD

**Top receivers**

- NYG – Evan Engram 7 receptions, 99 yards, 1 TD
- OAK – Cordarrelle Patterson 4 receptions, 97 yards

**Top tacklers**

- NYG – Kelvin Sheppard 8 tackles
- OAK – NaVorro Bowman, Nicholas Morrow 9 tackles

For the first time since 2004, Eli Manning did not start the game and was benched in favor of Geno Smith in a move that was universally panned by the football community. Present and former teammates, opponents, fans, executives, television and radio show hosts quickly came to Manning's defense and the fans revolted. It was also the first time a Manning did not start in an NFL game since Week 17 of the 1997 NFL season. An attempted comeback fell short dropping the Giants to 2–10, their worst record since 1976. Smith completed 21 of 34 passes for 212 yards and one touchdown and lost two redzone fumbles. The following day, the Giants announced that head coach Ben McAdoo and general manager Jerry Reese had been fired. Defensive coordinator Steve Spagnuolo took over as the interim head coach and immediately reinstated Manning as the Giants quarterback.

==== Week 14: vs. Dallas Cowboys ====
Week Fourteen: Dallas Cowboys at New York Giants – Game summary

Quarter	1	2	3	4	Total
**Cowboys**	3	7	0	20	**30**
Giants	0	10	0	0	**10**

at MetLife Stadium, East Rutherford, New Jersey

- Date: December 10
- Game time: 1:00 pm. EST
- Game weather: 39 °F (4 °C), fair
- Game attendance: 78,125
- Referee: Walt Anderson
- TV announcers (Fox): Kevin Burkhardt, Charles Davis and Pam Oliver
- Recap, Gamebook

Game information

**First quarter**

- DAL – Dan Bailey 21-yard field goal, 7:14. Cowboys 3–0. **Drive: 16 plays, 73 yards, 7:46.**

**Second quarter**

- NYG – Aldrick Rosas 39-yard field goal, 12:50. Tied 3–3. **Drive: 17 plays, 62 yards, 9:24.**
- NYG – Rhett Ellison 1-yard pass from Eli Manning (Aldrick Rosas kick), 2:07. Giants 10–3. **Drive: 8 plays, 68 yards, 4:17.**
- DAL – Dez Bryant 50-yard pass from Dak Prescott (Dan Bailey kick), 1:38. Tied 10–10. **Drive: 4 plays, 75 yards, 0:29.**

**Third quarter**

- No scoring plays.

**Fourth quarter**

- DAL – Jason Witten 20-yard pass from Dak Prescott (Dan Bailey kick), 7:38. Cowboys 17–10. **Drive: 4 plays, 82 yards, 1:51.**
- DAL – Rod Smith 81-yard pass from Dak Prescott (kick failed), 4:08. Cowboys 23–10. **Drive: 3 plays, 88 yards, 0:25.**
- DAL – Rod Smith 15-yard run (Dan Bailey kick), 2:57. Cowboys 30–10. **Drive: 3 plays, 21 yards, 0:19.**

**Top passers**

- DAL – Dak Prescott – 20/30, 332 yards, 3 TD
- NYG – Eli Manning – 31/46, 228 yards, 1 TD, 2 INT

**Top rushers**

- DAL – Alfred Morris – 19 carries, 62 yards
- NYG – Wayne Gallman – 12 carries, 59 yards

**Top receivers**

- DAL – Rod Smith – 5 receptions, 113 yards, 1 TD
- NYG – Evan Engram – 4 receptions, 54 yards

With Eli Manning back in the starting position, both the Giants and Cowboys were tied up at 10 heading into the 4th quarter until Dallas scored 20 unanswered points and shutout the struggling Giants offense to drop the Giants to 2–11. This was the first time the Giants lost more than 10 games in a season since 2003 and first under the Eli Manning era.

==== Week 15: vs. Philadelphia Eagles ====
Week Fifteen: Philadelphia Eagles at New York Giants – Game summary

Quarter	1	2	3	4	Total
**Eagles**	7	14	10	3	**34**
Giants	13	10	6	0	**29**

at MetLife Stadium, East Rutherford, New Jersey

- Date: December 17
- Game time: 1:00 pm. EST
- Game weather: 35 °F (2 °C), cloudy
- Game attendance: 76,896
- Referee: Brad Allen
- TV announcers (Fox): Thom Brennaman, Chris Spielman and Peter Schrager
- Recap, Gamebook

Game information

**First quarter**

- NYG – Orleans Darkwa 1-yard rush (kick blocked), 9:04. Giants 6–0. **Drive: 13 plays, 76 yards, 5:56.**
- PHI – Alshon Jeffery 3-yard pass from Nick Foles (Jake Elliott kick), 5:28. Eagles 7–6. **Drive: 7 plays, 38 yards, 3:36.**
- NYG – Tavarres King 13-yard pass from Eli Manning (Aldrick Rosas kick), 1:26. Giants 13–7. **Drive: 10 plays, 75 yards, 4:02.**

**Second quarter**

- NYG – Sterling Shepard 67-yard pass from Eli Manning (Aldrick Rosas kick), 13:44. Giants 20–7. **Drive: 3 plays, 75 yards, 1:03.**
- PHI – Zach Ertz 10-yard pass from Nick Foles (Jake Elliott kick), 4:49. Giants 20–14. **Drive: 5 plays, 20 yards, 1:24.**
- PHI – Trey Burton 13-yard pass from Nick Foles (Jake Elliott kick), 2:20. Eagles 21–20. **Drive: 3 plays, 18 yards, 0:56.**
- NYG – Aldrick Rosas 28-yard field goal, 0:27. Giants 23–21. **Drive: 11 plays, 50 yards, 1:53.**

**Third quarter**

- PHI – Jake Elliott 28-yard field goal, 9:18. Eagles 24–23. **Drive: 11 plays, 64 yards, 5:42.**
- PHI – Nelson Agholor 10-yard pass from Nick Foles (Jake Elliott kick), 5:47. Eagles 31–23. **Drive: 5 plays, 64 yards, 2:51.**
- NYG – Tavarres King 57-yard pass from Eli Manning (pass failed), 1:57. Eagles 31–29. **Drive: 8 plays, 75 yards, 3:50.**

**Fourth quarter**

- PHI – Jake Elliott 20-yard field goal, 3:56. Eagles 34–29. **Drive: 14 plays, 60 yards, 7:30.**

**Top passers**

- PHI – Nick Foles: 24/38, 237 yards, 4 TD
- NYG – Eli Manning: 37/57, 434 yards, 3 TD, INT

**Top rushers**

- PHI – Jay Ajayi: 12 rushes, 49 yards
- NYG – Wayne Gallman: 8 rushes, 39 yards

**Top receivers**

- PHI – Nelson Agholor: 7 receptions, 59 yards, TD
- NYG – Sterling Shepard: 11 receptions, 139 yards, TD

**Top tacklers**

- PHI – Nigel Bradham: 8 tackles, 3 assists, Rodney McLeod: 7 tackles, 4 assists
- NYG – Eli Apple: 7 tackles, 2 assists, Darian Thompson: 6 tackles, 3 assists

Despite the Giants going up 20–7 at one point, poor special team mishaps and an attempted comeback that fell 6 yards short led the Eagles to win in a thriller of a game to drop the Giants to 2–12, tying their worst record since 1974. Despite their miscues, the Giants dominated on offense going for just under 500 yards and Eli Manning had his best performance this season. With a Washington Redskins' 20–15 win over the Arizona Cardinals, the Giants secured a fourth place finish in the NFC East for the first time since 2003.

==== Week 16: at Arizona Cardinals ====
Week Sixteen: New York Giants at Arizona Cardinals – Game summary

Quarter	1	2	3	4	Total
Giants	0	0	0	0	**0**
**Cardinals**	3	7	6	7	**23**

at University of Phoenix Stadium, Glendale, Arizona

- Date: December 24
- Game time: 4:25 pm. EST/2:25 pm. MST
- Game weather: Played indoors (retractable roof closed)
- Game attendance: 63,850
- Referee: John Parry
- TV announcers (Fox): Dick Stockton, Mark Schlereth and Shannon Spake
- Recap, Gamebook

Game information

**First quarter**

- ARI – Phil Dawson 21-yard field goal, 5:29. Cardinals 3–0. **Drive: 9 plays, 46 yards, 5:16.**

**Second quarter**

- ARI – Larry Fitzgerald 13-yard pass from Drew Stanton (Phil Dawson kick), 1:01. Cardinals 10–0. **Drive: 9 plays, 79 yards, 2:04.**

**Third quarter**

- ARI – John Brown 15-yard pass from Drew Stanton (Phil Dawson kick), 9:25. Cardinals 17–0. **Drive: 11 plays, 75 yards, 5:32.**

**Fourth quarter**

- ARI – Robert Nkemdiche 21-yard fumble return (Phil Dawson kick), 14:50. Cardinals 23–0.

**Top passers**

- NYG – Eli Manning – 27/45, 263 yards, 2 INT
- ARI – Drew Stanton – 20/34, 209 yards, 2 TD, 2 INT

**Top rushers**

- NYG – Wayne Gallman – 10 carries, 18 yards
- ARI – Kerwynn Williams – 16 carries, 51 yards

**Top receivers**

- NYG – Rhett Ellison – 4 receptions, 60 yards
- ARI – Larry Fitzgerald – 9 receptions, 119 yards, 1 TD

**Top tacklers**

- NYG –
- ARI –

Shutout for the first time since 2014, the Giants offense could not get into the end zone and their only chance at points came on a missed field goal by Aldrick Rosas. The 2017 Giants became the first team in franchise history to lose 13+ games in a season until the 2021 team tied this loss record, which would then be surpassed by the 2024 team.

==== Week 17: vs. Washington Redskins ====
Week Seventeen: Washington Redskins at New York Giants – Game summary

Quarter	1	2	3	4	Total
Redskins	7	3	0	0	**10**
**Giants**	15	0	0	3	**18**

at MetLife Stadium, East Rutherford, New Jersey

- Date: December 31
- Game time: 1:00 pm. EST
- Game weather: 16 °F (−9 °C), partly cloudy
- Game attendance: 76,269
- Referee: John Hussey
- TV announcers (Fox): Sam Rosen, Matt Millen and Jennifer Hale
- Recap, Gamebook

Game information

**First quarter**

- NYG – Orleans Darkwa 75-yard run (kick blocked), 14:43. Giants 6–0. **Drive: 2 plays, 75 yards, 0:17.**
- NYG – Hunter Sharp 16-yard pass from Eli Manning (pass failed), 12:42. Giants 12–0. **Drive: 2 plays, 19 yards, 0:41.**
- WAS – Kirk Cousins 12-yard run (Dustin Hopkins kick), 7:55. Giants 12–7. **Drive: 2 plays, 20 yards, 0:45.**
- NYG – Aldrick Rosas 23-yard field goal, 4:49. Giants 15–7. **Drive: 9 plays, 70 yards, 3:06.**

**Second quarter**

- WAS – Dustin Hopkins 49-yard field goal, 0:00. Giants 15–10. **Drive: 1 plays, 0 yards, 0:04.**

**Third quarter**

- No scoring plays.

**Fourth quarter**

- NYG – Aldrick Rosas 29-yard field goal, 14:09. Giants 18–10. **Drive: 10 plays, 52 yards, 3:32.**

**Top passers**

- WAS – Kirk Cousins – 20/37, 158 yards, 3 INT
- NYG – Eli Manning – 10/28, 132 yards, TD, INT

**Top rushers**

- WAS – Kapri Bibbs – 12 carries, 47 yards
- NYG – Orleans Darkwa – 20 carries, 154 yards, TD

**Top receivers**

- WAS – Kapri Bibbs – 8 receptions, 53 yards
- NYG – Rhett Ellison – 5 receptions, 63 yards

**Top tacklers**

- WAS –
- NYG –

In his final game with the Redskins, Kirk Cousins was intercepted and sacked three times each against the Giants defense. The Giants also had a surging run game with over 250 yards on the ground, with Orleans Darkwa setting a new career high with 154 yards. The Giants defeated the Redskins 18–10 and finished their season 3–13. With the Colts beating the Texans that day, the Giants locked in the #2 pick in the 2018 NFL draft.

This was Steve Spagnuolo's first and only win as the Giants head coach, and their only win against any NFC team during the season, avoiding a division sweep, and avoided finishing winless against NFC teams.

== Standings ==
=== Division ===
NFC East
	W	L	T	PCT	DIV	CONF	PF	PA	STK
^{(1)} Philadelphia Eagles	13	3	0	.813	5–1	10–2	457	295	L1
Dallas Cowboys	9	7	0	.563	5–1	7–5	354	332	W1
Washington Redskins	7	9	0	.438	1–5	5–7	342	388	L1
New York Giants	3	13	0	.188	1–5	1–11	246	388	W1

=== Conference ===
NFC
#	Team	Division	W	L	T	PCT	DIV	CONF	SOS	SOV	STK
Division leaders
1 (Note: Philadelphia claimed the No. 1 seed over Minnesota based on winning percentage vs. common opponents. Philadelphia's cumulative record against Carolina, Chicago, the Los Angeles Rams and Washington was 5–0, compared to Minnesota's 4–1 cumulative record against the same four teams.)	Philadelphia Eagles	East	13	3	0	.813	5–1	10–2	.461	.433	L1
2	Minnesota Vikings	North	13	3	0	.813	5–1	10–2	.492	.447	W3
3 (Note: LA Rams claimed the No. 3 seed over New Orleans based on head-to-head victory.)	Los Angeles Rams	West	11	5	0	.688	4–2	7–5	.504	.460	L1
4 (Note: New Orleans clinched the NFC South division over Carolina based on head-to-head sweep.)	New Orleans Saints	South	11	5	0	.688	4–2	8–4	.535	.483	L1
Wild Cards
5	Carolina Panthers	South	11	5	0	.688	3–3	7–5	.539	.500	L1
6	Atlanta Falcons	South	10	6	0	.625	4–2	9–3	.543	.475	W1
Did not qualify for the postseason
7 (Note: Detroit finished ahead of Dallas and Seattle based on conference record, while Seattle finished ahead of Dallas based on head-to-head victory.)	Detroit Lions	North	9	7	0	.563	5–1	8–4	.496	.368	W1
8	Seattle Seahawks	West	9	7	0	.563	4–2	7–5	.492	.444	L1
9	Dallas Cowboys	East	9	7	0	.563	5–1	7–5	.496	.438	W1
10	Arizona Cardinals	West	8	8	0	.500	3–3	5–7	.488	.406	W2
11 (Note: Green Bay finished ahead of Washington based on record vs. common opponents. Green Bay's cumulative record against Dallas, Minnesota, New Orleans and Seattle was 2–3, compared to Washington's 1–4 cumulative record against the same four teams.)	Green Bay Packers	North	7	9	0	.438	2–4	5–7	.539	.357	L3
12	Washington Redskins	East	7	9	0	.438	1–5	5–7	.539	.429	L1
13	San Francisco 49ers	West	6	10	0	.375	1–5	3–9	.512	.438	W5
14 (Note: Tampa Bay finished ahead of Chicago based on head-to-head victory.)	Tampa Bay Buccaneers	South	5	11	0	.313	1–5	3–9	.555	.375	W1
15	Chicago Bears	North	5	11	0	.313	0–6	1–11	.559	.500	L1
16	New York Giants	East	3	13	0	.188	1–5	1–11	.531	.458	W1
Tiebreakers (Note: When breaking ties for three or more teams under the NFL's rules, they are first broken within divisions, then comparing only the highest-ranked remaining team from each division.)

== See also ==
- List of organizational conflicts in the NFL
