= Dave Gettleman =

American football executive (born 1951)

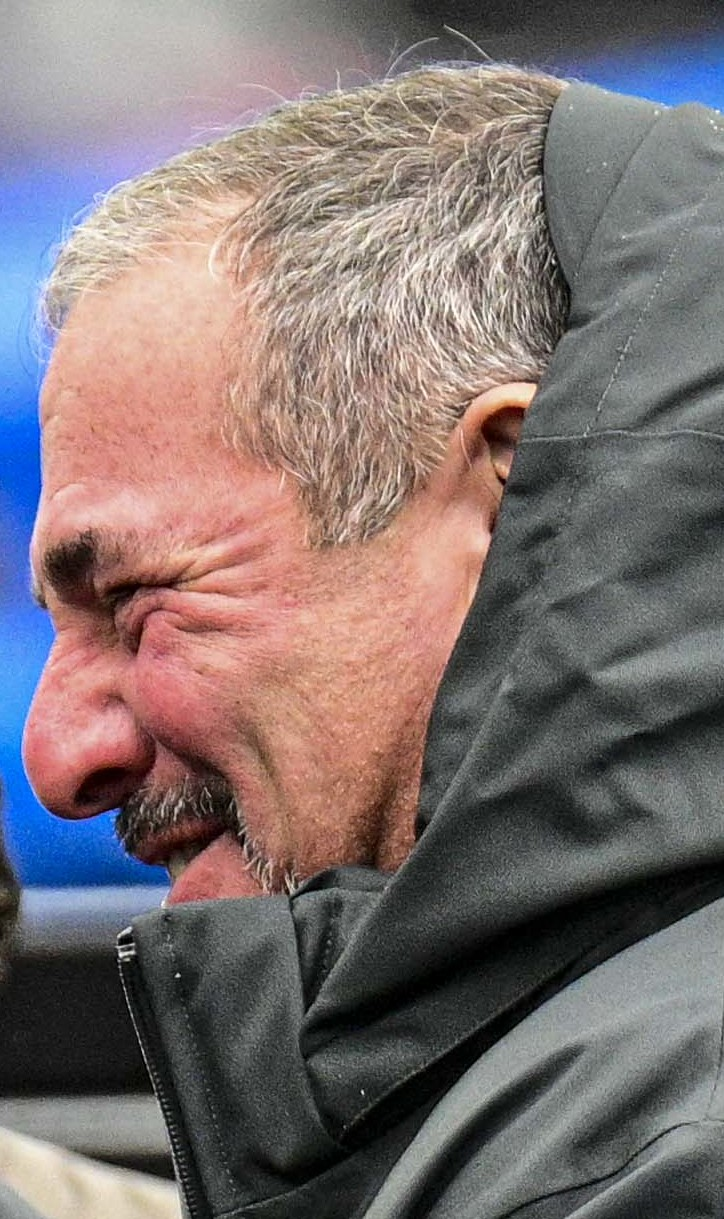
- Gettleman in 2022

Personal information
- Born: February 21, 1951 (age 75); Boston, Massachusetts, U.S.

Career information
- High school: Boston Latin
- College: Springfield

Career history
- Buffalo Bills (1986) Scouting intern; Buffalo Bills (1987–1993) Scout; Denver Broncos (1994–1997) Scout; New York Giants (1998) Scout; New York Giants (1999–2011) Director of pro personnel; New York Giants (2012) Senior pro personnel analyst; Carolina Panthers (2013–2017) General manager; New York Giants (2018–2021) General manager

Awards and highlights
- As executive: 3× Super Bowl champion (XXXII, XLII, XLVI)
- Executive profile at Pro Football Reference

David Alan Gettleman (born February 21, 1951) is an American former professional football executive in the National Football League (NFL). He was the general manager for the Carolina Panthers from 2013 to 2017 and the New York Giants from 2018 to 2021.

== Early life and education ==
Gettleman grew up in the Mattapan neighborhood of Boston, Massachusetts. He attended Boston Latin School, where he played varsity football. He then attended Springfield College, where he earned a degree in education and played offensive tackle on the freshman football team. Gettleman has two master's degrees: one in physical education from Southern Connecticut State in 1978, and another in sports administration from St. Thomas University in 1986.

== Football career ==
=== Coaching ===
He began his football career as a teacher-coach at Spackenkill High School in Poughkeepsie, New York. As the head coach from 1973 to 1978 and from 1980 to 1981, Gettleman led his teams to two league titles, competing against schools twice the size as Spackenkill. He spent a season as a volunteer assistant at Cal State Long Beach in 1979. Gettleman joined the faculty of Kingston High School in 1982 and became the head coach in 1984, leading his team to a Section I Bowl berth.

=== Front office ===
==== Early career (1986–97) ====
Gettleman was hired by Bill Polian in 1986 as a scouting intern for the Buffalo Bills. He spent the next seven years working in their scouting department before leaving to accept a scouting job with the Denver Broncos after the 1993 season. Gettleman was responsible for scouting players from the East and Southeast regions during his four-year tenure in Denver.

==== New York Giants (1998–2012) ====
In 1998, he was hired as a scout by the New York Giants, who promoted him to pro personnel director the next year. In 2012, he was given the title of senior pro personnel analyst. During his first tenure with the Giants, he focused on improving the team's offensive line, and also acquired Mike Barrow, who led the team in tackles in 2000. He signed Plaxico Burress prior to the 2005 season, who became one of the team's best wide receivers and a star on the Super Bowl XLII team, and Antonio Pierce, who went on to have over 100 tackles each year from 2005 to 2007, as well as kicker Lawrence Tynes. Many of these players also contributed to the Super Bowl XLVI team, along with new additions Antrel Rolle, linebacker Michael Boley (the team's top two tacklers), defensive tackles Chris Canty and Rocky Bernard, and punter Steve Weatherford.

==== Carolina Panthers (2013–17) ====
In January 2013, he was chosen to become the general manager of the Carolina Panthers. In the 2015 season, the Panthers started 14–0, before falling to the Atlanta Falcons in Week 16.

The team defeated the Seattle Seahawks and Arizona Cardinals in the playoffs, en route to Super Bowl 50 on February 7, 2016. The Panthers fell to the Denver Broncos by a score of 24–10. On July 17, 2017, the Panthers relieved him of his duties as general manager.

During Gettleman's tenure as general manager, the Panthers compiled a regular-season record of 40-23–1. In that four season timeframe, the Panthers made the playoffs 3 times and won 3 NFC South division titles.

==== Return to the Giants (2018–2021) ====
On December 28, 2017, Gettleman was named as the new general manager of the New York Giants, returning to the team after five years.

Gettleman's second tenure began by hiring a new head coach in Pat Shurmur, and with drafting running back Saquon Barkley second overall in the 2018 NFL draft, ahead of notable quarterbacks Sam Darnold (third), Josh Allen (seventh), Josh Rosen (tenth), and Lamar Jackson (32nd). In his first season, the team finished 5–11, last place in the NFC East.

The following year, Gettleman traded wide receiver Odell Beckham Jr. to the Cleveland Browns, which caused controversy among fans and the media. Gettleman also drafted Duke quarterback Daniel Jones with the sixth overall pick. With Jones at the helm starting in game three, the team finished 4–12. Shurmur was fired after the season in favor of Joe Judge.

The 2020 season was a small improvement for the team, as they finished 6–10, but missed the playoffs for the fourth consecutive year in Week 17.

In 2021, the Giants started the season 1–5, finishing the season with a 4–13 record, suffering their fifth consecutive losing season and missing the playoffs again.

Gettleman retired following the 2021 season finishing his tenure with the Giants with a 19–46 (.292) record in four seasons. At no point during Gettleman's tenure did the Giants have a winning record, and they reached .500 only once, during week 4 of the 2019 season.

During Gettleman's tenure, Gettleman had been repeatedly criticized by fans and former Giants players which includes Landon Collins, Odell Beckham Jr., Scott Simonson, and Shane Smith on how the Giants have fallen during his tenure.

Gettleman received criticism for his perceived poor draft record, including passing on several quarterbacks in the 2018 draft, trading up for Deandre Baker in the 2019 draft only to be cut the next season following his May 2020 arrest, and trading down in the 2021 draft, passing up future Pro Bowlers Micah Parsons and Rashawn Slater for wide receiver Kadarius Toney, who was traded to the Kansas City Chiefs the following season.

Gettleman was also criticized for failing to fix the offensive line, and lackluster free agent signings and trades, which includes Golden Tate, who was promptly suspended, and signing Kenny Golladay to a $72-million dollar contract over four years, who struggled and was cut after his second year with the team.

== Personal life ==
Gettleman is a Messianic Jew. On June 5, 2018, it was announced Gettleman would undergo treatment for lymphoma, which was described as being "in complete remission" that July. He and his wife Joanne have three children.
