= Kevin Abrams (American football executive) =

American football executive (born 1971)

Personal information
- Born: August 19, 1971 (age 55); Toronto, Ontario, Canada

Career information
- College: University of Western Ontario

Career history
- New York Giants (1999–2001) Salary cap analyst; New York Giants (2002–2017) Assistant General manager; New York Giants (2017) Interim General manager; New York Giants (2018–2021) VP of football operations/Assistant GM; New York Giants (2022–2025) Senior vice president of football operations & strategy

Awards and highlights
- As executive: 2× Super Bowl champion (XLII, XLVI)

Kevin C. Abrams (born August 1971) is a Canadian-born American football executive was formerly the senior vice president of football operations & strategy of the New York Giants of the National Football League (NFL). Abrams worked as the Interim General Manager during the 2017 NFL season following the firing of his boss Jerry Reese.

== Career ==
=== Early career ===
Abrams began his career working as an intern for Ohio University football program, the Buffalo Bills, the Washington Redskins, and the London Monarchs.

=== NFL ===
Abrams began his career in the NFL working for the NFL Management Council as a salary cap analyst analyzing NFL player contracts.

In July 1999, following his work with the NFL Management Council, Abrams was hired by the New York Giants as a salary cap analyst, a newly created position by the team. In 2002 Abrams was promoted to assistant general manager working under GM Ernie Accorsi. During the 2017 NFL season, Abrams worked as the Interim General Manager due to the firing of his boss, GM Jerry Reese. Abrams was interviewed for the Giants GM position, however, he was beaten out by former Carolina Panthers General Manager and former longtime Giants employee, Dave Gettleman.

On February 5, 2022, Abrams was named senior vice president of football operations and strategy for the New York Giants with his tenure ending in 2026.

On January 21, 2026, Abrams was let go by the Giants as part of organizational restructuring following the hiring of John Harbaugh.

== Personal life ==
Abrams currently lives in Manhattan with his wife, Sarah-Jane, and three kids.
