= Odell Beckham Jr. =

American football player (born 1992)

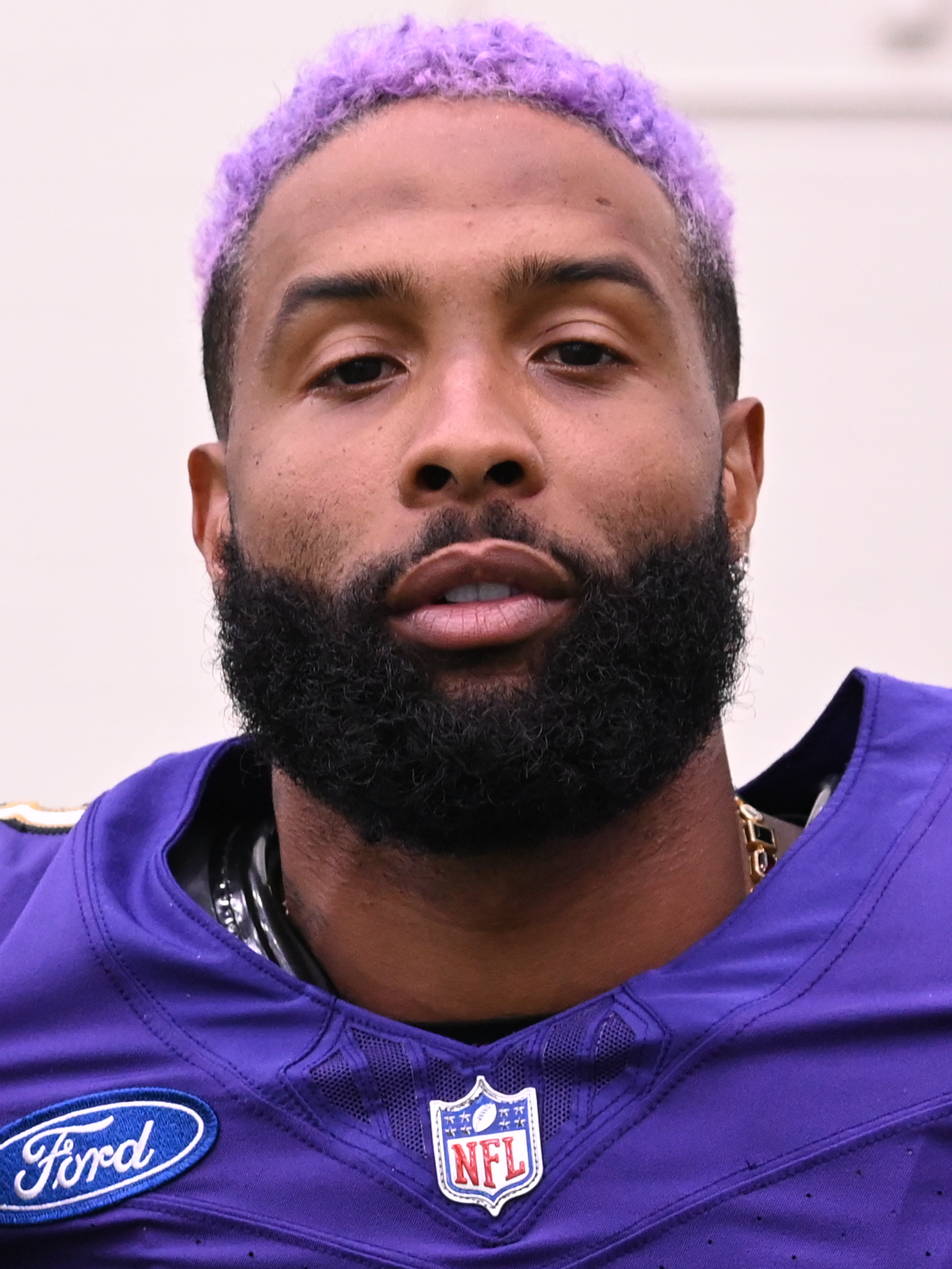
- Beckham with the Baltimore Ravens in 2023

No. 9 – Minnesota Vikings
- Position: Wide receiver
- Roster status: Practice squad

Personal information
- Born: November 5, 1992 (age 34); Baton Rouge, Louisiana, U.S.
- Listed height: 5 ft 11 in (1.80 m)
- Listed weight: 198 lb (90 kg)

Career information
- High school: Isidore Newman (New Orleans, Louisiana)
- College: LSU (2011–2013)
- NFL draft: 2014: 1st round, 12th overall pick

Career history
- New York Giants (2014–2018); Cleveland Browns (2019–2021); Los Angeles Rams (2021); Baltimore Ravens (2023); Miami Dolphins (2024); New York Giants (2026); Minnesota Vikings (2026–present)

Awards and highlights
- Super Bowl champion (LVI); NFL Offensive Rookie of the Year (2014); 2× Second-team All-Pro (2015, 2016); 3× Pro Bowl (2014–2016); PFWA All-Rookie Team (2014); 37th greatest New York Giant of all-time; Paul Hornung Award (2013); First-team All-American (2013); First-team All-SEC (2013)

Career NFL statistics as of Week 9, 2026
- Receptions: 575
- Receiving yards: 7,987
- Receiving touchdowns: 59
- Stats at Pro Football Reference

Odell Cornelious Beckham Jr. (born November 5, 1992), commonly known by his initials OBJ, is an American professional football wide receiver for the Minnesota Vikings of the National Football League (NFL). He played college football for the LSU Tigers and was selected by the New York Giants in the first round of the 2014 NFL draft. He has played in the NFL for the Cleveland Browns, Los Angeles Rams, Baltimore Ravens, and Miami Dolphins. He had a second, short stint with the Giants in 2026.

Beckham started the 2012 BCS National Championship Game in his first year playing at LSU, and won the Paul Hornung Award following his junior season in 2013.

In his first season with the Giants, Beckham broke numerous NFL rookie receiving records, despite missing the first four games of the season due to injury. Beckham became the first player to record more than 75 receptions, 1,100 yards, and ten touchdowns in a rookie season, and broke the rookie record for the most average receiving yards per game. During Week 12 of his first season, Beckham came to national attention when he made a one-handed touchdown catch while falling backwards in a Sunday Night Football game against the Dallas Cowboys, which numerous pundits and athletes called "the greatest catch ever made". Beckham won the 2014 Offensive Rookie of the Year award.

In 2016, he became the fastest player in NFL history to reach both 200 career receptions and 4,000 career receiving yards. That same season, he recorded his first 100-reception season and reached the NFL playoffs for the first time in his career, after helping the Giants to an 11–5 season record. Beckham was named to the Pro Bowl in each of his first three seasons and has been named a second-team All-Pro twice.

After a stint with the Cleveland Browns, Beckham was signed by the Los Angeles Rams midway through the 2021 season. Beckham and the Rams went on to win Super Bowl LVI. He spent the 2022 season out of football while rehabbing an ACL injury he sustained in the Super Bowl before signing with the Baltimore Ravens in 2023. He left Baltimore for the Miami Dolphins in 2024 and mutually agreed to be released the following December. After missing the 2025 season, he returned to the Giants in 2026 but was eventually released and picked up by the Minnesota Vikings.

== Early life ==
Beckham was born in Baton Rouge, Louisiana. He attended Isidore Newman School in New Orleans, Louisiana, where he was a letterman in football, basketball, and track. In football, he played wide receiver, quarterback, running back, and cornerback for the Greenies football team. As a junior, he caught 45 passes for 743 yards and 10 touchdowns, while also adding three more scores on the ground. As a senior, he hauled in 50 catches for 1,010 yards and 19 touchdowns, joining Cooper Manning as the only two players in school history to record 1,000 receiving yards in a season. In addition, he rushed for 331 yards and six touchdowns, passed for 90 yards and a score and also averaged 30.0 yards per punt return. He was named to the Times Picayune 2011 Blue-Chip list and to the Louisiana 2A All-State first-team as a wide receiver, while he also earned District 9-2A Offensive MVP honors and a spot on The Advocate's Super Dozen.

In basketball, Beckham lettered all four years and was an all-district selection his junior and senior years. As a standout track & field athlete, Beckham followed in his mother's footsteps to excel in the sprinting and jumping events while at Newman High. He took silver in the long jump event at the 2010 Newman Invitational, with a career-best leap of 6.83 meters. At the 2010 LA 2A State Meet, he earned sixth-place finishes in both the 200-meter dash, with a PR time of 22.31 seconds, and in the long jump, with a leap of 6.71 meters (21 ft 11 in). He was also a member of the Newman 4 × 100 m and 4 × 200 m relay teams.

Beckham also played soccer growing up and considers English player David Beckham his childhood idol. His soccer club coaches offered Beckham a chance to try out for a junior national team program, but he did not want to spend the required time overseas considering his talents in other sports at home.

Regarded as a four-star recruit by both Rivals.com and Scout.com, Beckham was rated as the No. 6 wide receiver and as the No. 40 player in the nation. He chose Louisiana State University (LSU) over scholarship offers from Ole Miss, Nebraska, Tulane, and Tulsa, among others. He also played in the 2011 U.S. Army All-American Bowl.

== College career ==
=== 2011 season ===
As a true freshman at LSU in 2011, Beckham started nine of 14 games. He made his collegiate debut on September 3, 2011, against the #3 Oregon Ducks. Against the Ducks, he had two receptions for 10 yards in the 40–27 victory. Against the #16 West Virginia Mountaineers on September 24, Beckham scored his first career collegiate touchdown, a 52-yard reception from Jarrett Lee, in the 47–21 victory. In the SEC Championship against the #12 Georgia Bulldogs, Beckham was held without a catch but did have two punt returns in the 42–10 victory. The Tigers finished with a 13–0 record and made the BCS National Championship game in Beckham's freshman season. In the game, which was a rematch against the Alabama Crimson Tide, Beckham had five receptions for 38 yards in the 21–0 defeat. Overall, in his freshman season, Beckham finished second on the team with 41 receptions for 475 yards and tied for third with two receiving touchdowns. He was named a freshman All-SEC selection.

=== 2012 season ===
As a sophomore in 2012, Beckham started 12 of 13 games for the Tigers. In the season opener against the North Texas Mean Green, he had his first collegiate career punt return touchdown, a 70-yard return in the first quarter of the 41–14 victory. On September 29, he had his first career collegiate game with over 100 yards against the Towson Tigers. He had five receptions for 128 yards and two touchdowns in the 38–22 victory over the Tigers. On November 17, against SEC West rival Ole Miss, he was held to only two receptions for 13 yards, but he had an 89-yard punt return touchdown in the fourth quarter help tie the game late. The Tigers would end up beating the Rebels by a score of 41–35. In the regular season finale against the Arkansas Razorbacks, he had four receptions for 112 receiving yards in the 20–13 victory. LSU finished with a 10–2 record and qualified for the Chick-fil-A Bowl against Clemson. Beckham had three receptions for 40 receiving yards as LSU lost 25–24 on a game-winning field goal by Clemson as time expired. He finished first on the team in receiving yards with 713, second in receptions with 43, only behind Jarvis Landry's 56 receptions, and third on the team with two receiving touchdowns.

=== 2013 season ===
As a junior in 2013, he combined with Jarvis Landry to form one of the most productive wide receiver duos in college football. On August 31, in the Tigers' regular season opener, he had five receptions for 118 receiving yards in the 37–27 victory over #20 TCU at AT&T Stadium in Arlington, Texas. On September 7, in the game against UAB, Beckham had five receptions for 136 yards and three touchdowns in the 56–17 victory. In the same game, he returned a failed field goal attempt for a record-long 109 yards and a touchdown, and this record would be tied by Auburn's Chris Davis later that year against the Alabama Crimson Tide. On October 5, against SEC West rival Mississippi State, Beckham had nine receptions for a then-career high 179 receiving yards with two touchdowns in the 59–26 victory. Against the Furman Paladins on October 26, Beckham had six receptions for a collegiate career-high 204 yards and two touchdowns in the 48–16 victory. He was a first and second-team All-Southeastern Conference (SEC) selection. In his role as a wide receiver and return specialist, Beckham was named the winner of the 2013 Paul Hornung Award, presented annually to the most versatile player in major college football. He finished the 2013 season with 57 receptions for 1,117 yards and eight touchdowns. He led the SEC with 32 kickoff returns for 845 net yards in the 2013 season.

After the season, he decided to forgo his senior season and entered the 2014 NFL draft.

== Professional career ==
Pre-draft measurables
Height	Weight	Arm length	Hand span	Wingspan	40-yard dash	10-yard split	20-yard split	20-yard shuttle	Three-cone drill	Vertical jump	Broad jump	Bench press
5 ft 11 1/4 in (1.81 m)	198 lb (90 kg)	32 3/4 in (0.83 m)	10 in (0.25 m)	6 ft 6 1/8 in (1.98 m)	4.43 s	1.57 s	2.58 s	3.94 s	6.69 s	38.5 in (0.98 m)	10 ft 2 in (3.10 m)	7 reps
All values from NFL Combine

=== New York Giants (first stint) ===
==== 2014 season ====
Beckham was selected by the New York Giants with the 12th overall pick in the first round of the 2014 NFL draft. He was the third wide receiver to be selected that year. He signed a four-year contract with the Giants on May 19, 2014. The deal was for $10.4 million with a $5.88 million signing bonus.

After missing a majority of the training camp, preseason, and the first four games of the season because of a hamstring injury, Beckham made his debut on October 5, 2014, in Week 5 against the Atlanta Falcons recording four receptions for 44 yards and a touchdown in the 30–20 victory. In his first Monday Night Football game against the Indianapolis Colts, Beckham caught eight passes for 156 yards in the 40–24 loss. Against the Seattle Seahawks in Week 10, he caught seven passes for 108 yards in the 38–17 loss. On November 23, 2014, during a game against the Dallas Cowboys on Sunday Night Football, Beckham had 10 catches for 146 yards and two touchdowns, including a one-handed touchdown reception hailed as the "catch of the year", with Cris Collinsworth, Tony Dungy, Victor Cruz and LeBron James all saying that it was one of the best catches ever. Beckham made this catch despite a pass interference penalty called on Dallas cornerback Brandon Carr while diving backwards with full extension of his right hand using only three fingers. The Giants still lost by a score of 31–28 due to a late fourth quarter touchdown throw from Tony Romo to Dez Bryant. On December 8, 2014, the Pro Football Hall of Fame put Beckham's game-worn jersey from his famous one-handed catch game against Dallas on display.

Beckham finished November with 38 receptions, 593 receiving yards and two touchdowns. He had at least 90 yards receiving in all five games in November, setting an NFL rookie record for a calendar month. He also broke Bill Groman's and Randy Moss's rookie record for consecutive games with 90 or more receiving yards in a season. In Week 14, Beckham extended his 90 receiving yard streak to 6 games, recording 11 receptions for 131 yards and a touchdown in a 36–7 victory over the Tennessee Titans. He also joined Bill Groman as the only rookies to have over 700 receiving yards in a six-game span.

On December 14, 2014, Beckham became the first NFL rookie with at least 12 catches, 140 yards, and three scores in a game racking up 143 receiving yards, 12 catches and three touchdowns. With his 12 receptions, Beckham tied former Giants tight end Mark Bavaro for the most in a game by a Giants rookie; Bavaro had 12 catches against the Cincinnati Bengals on October 13, 1985. Beckham's 143 receiving yards marked the fifth time he topped 100 receiving yards during the 2014 season, extending his own Giants record and setting an NFL rookie record of over 90 receiving yards in seven straight games. With 61 catches over seven games, Beckham also set the record for most ever receptions by an NFL rookie in a seven-game span. On December 21, 2014, Beckham extended his streak of 90 or more receiving yards in game to 8 when he racked up 148 receiving yards on 8 receptions and also hauled in 2 touchdowns vs. St. Louis Rams, including an 80-yard score, the longest touchdown reception by a Giants rookie in franchise history. He also extended his streak of games with 130+ receiving yards and at least one receiving touchdown to three.

In the regular season finale against the Philadelphia Eagles, Beckham had a career-high 185 receiving yards, which was the most in a game by a rookie in franchise history. Mark Bavaro previously held the record when he had 176 receiving yards against the Cincinnati Bengals on October 13, 1985. Beckham also had 12 receptions and a receiving touchdown against the Eagles, which tied Torry Holt for most games with at least ten receptions, 100 receiving yards, and one receiving touchdown in a season with four. Beckham finished his impressive rookie campaign with 91 receptions, 1,305 yards and 12 touchdowns in just 12 games. He's the fourth rookie in NFL history to have at least 1,300 receiving yards in a season, and the only rookie to have at least 90 receptions and 10 receiving touchdowns in a season. Beckham was named a first-alternate for the 2015 Pro Bowl. On January 7, 2015, Beckham replaced Calvin Johnson in Pro Bowl due to injury. He was the first Giants rookie wide receiver in franchise history and the first Giants rookie since Jeremy Shockey in 2002 to make the Pro Bowl. He was named to the NFL All-Rookie Team.

Beckham revealed after the Pro Bowl game that during the 2014 season he suffered from two hamstring injuries before the season, one occurring in an early-offseason workout and another in a preseason game. Beckham stated, "I was never fully healthy, I was just trying to manage it and maintain it, It's still not right. [I'm] still working on it."

Beckham earned numerous accolades after the season, which sportswriters hailed as one of the greatest ever by a rookie. On January 31, 2015, Beckham was named Offensive Rookie of the Year by the Associated Press. He was also awarded the 2014 Pro Football Writers Association Offensive Rookie of the Year Award.

==== 2015 season ====
On May 13, 2015, Beckham was voted to the cover of Madden NFL 16, beating out Rob Gronkowski of the New England Patriots. Beckham is the youngest player ever to grace the cover of Madden.

Early in the season, Beckham had a strong game against the Falcons with seven receptions for 146 yards and one touchdown in the 24–20 defeat. On October 11, against the San Francisco 49ers, he had seven receptions for 121 yards and a touchdown in the 30–27 victory. In a 52–49 shootout with the New Orleans Saints in Week 8, Beckham had eight receptions for 130 yards and three touchdowns. His performance against the Saints was the first of six consecutive games for him with at least 100 receiving yards. After recording 105 receiving yards against the Tampa Bay Buccaneers in the following game, he had 104 yards, which included an 87-yard receiving touchdown, in a 27–26 loss to the then-undefeated New England Patriots. In the next game, against the Washington Redskins, he had nine receptions for 142 yards and a touchdown. In the next game, a 23–20 loss to the New York Jets, he had six receptions for 149 yards and a touchdown. Against the Miami Dolphins in Week 14, Beckham had a season-high 166 yards receiving and two touchdowns in the 31–24 victory. During the Week 15 game against the Carolina Panthers, Beckham was involved in multiple confrontations with cornerback Josh Norman. During the matchup, Beckham was flagged for four penalties, including three personal foul penalties. Beckham was held to no receptions in the first half, but he finished the game with six receptions for 76 receiving yards, which included a game-tying touchdown as the Giants lost to the Panthers by a score of 38–35. On December 21, 2015, the NFL Disciplinary Committee suspended Beckham one game without pay for multiple violations of safety-related playing rules. He appealed the decision, but the suspension was upheld. In 15 games, Beckham finished the season with career highs of 1,450 receiving yards and 13 touchdowns. The Giants finished with a 6–10 record and missed the playoffs. He was a Pro Bowl selection for a second year in a row and was ranked 10th by his fellow players on the NFL Top 100 Players of 2016.

==== 2016 season ====
Beckham entered the 2016 season with a new head coach, Ben McAdoo, after Tom Coughlin resigned from his position as the Giants' head coach. On September 17, Beckham was fined $12,154 for a dance-celebration during Week 1 against the Cowboys. On September 25, he was fined $36,000 for a blindside hit on safety Kenny Vaccaro in Week 2 against the Saints. During Week 3 against the Redskins, featuring Josh Norman, Beckham became the fastest player to reach 200 receptions by doing so in only 30 games. He finished the game with seven receptions for 121 receiving yards as the Giants lost a close game 27–29. In Week 6, Beckham caught eight passes for a career-high 222 yards with two touchdowns against the Baltimore Ravens, leading the Giants to a 27–23 victory. In Week 13 against the Pittsburgh Steelers, he had ten receptions for 100 receiving yards in the 24–14 loss. In Week 16, against the Eagles, he had 11 receptions for 150 receiving yards in the 24–19 loss. In 2016, Beckham started all 16 games for the first time in his career and finished with 101 receptions, which was a career-high, 1,367 receiving yards, and ten touchdowns. He was a Pro Bowl selection for a third year in a row. The Giants finished 11–5 in 2016, clinching a Wild Card spot, and returned to the playoffs for the first time since 2011, but lost 13–38 to the Green Bay Packers in the Wild Card Round. Beckham had four receptions for 28 yards in the loss. After the game, a frustrated Beckham punched a hole in the wall in the visiting teams' locker room. The Giants agreed to pay for damages and repairs were done ten days later. He was ranked eighth by his fellow players on the NFL Top 100 Players of 2017.

==== 2017 season ====
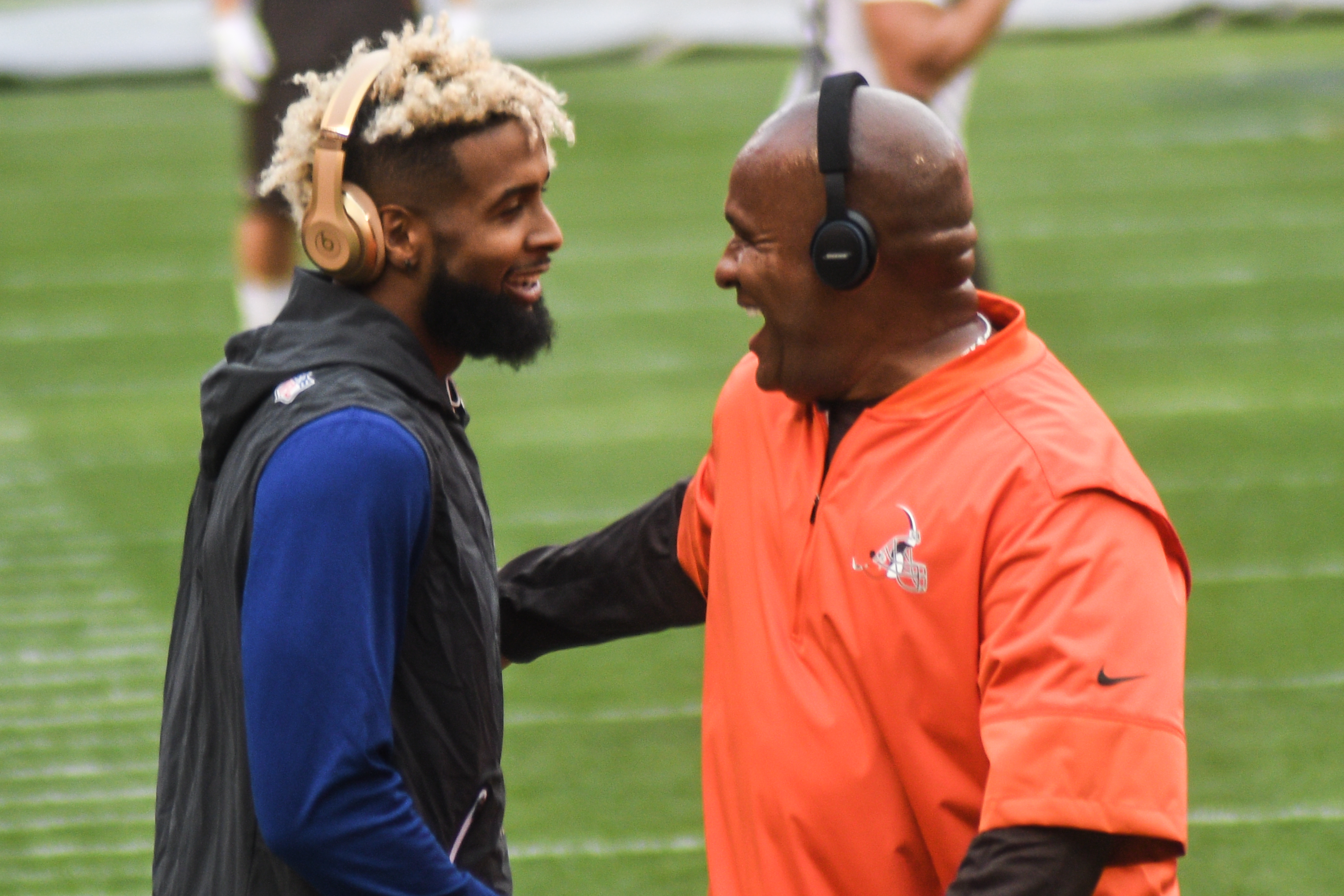
Beckham speaking to Cleveland Browns head coach Hue Jackson in 2017

On April 24, 2017, the Giants exercised Beckham's fifth-year option.

In the preseason, Beckham suffered an ankle sprain against the Cleveland Browns. Due to the injury, Beckham missed the regular season opener, but returned in Week 2 against the Detroit Lions, finishing with 36 receiving yards as the Giants lost 10–24. In the next game against the Philadelphia Eagles, he had 79 receiving yards and two receiving touchdowns, and was fined $12,154 for a celebration. During Week 5 against the Los Angeles Chargers, Beckham finished with 97 receiving yards and a touchdown until leaving the game with an apparent leg injury. It was later revealed that he suffered a fractured left ankle. Beckham underwent surgery to repair the fracture, keeping him out the remainder of the 2017 season after being placed on injured reserve. In four games, Beckham finished the 2017 season with 25 receptions for 302 yards and three touchdowns. Despite only playing four games, he was still ranked 77th by his peers on the NFL Top 100 Players of 2018.

==== 2018 season ====
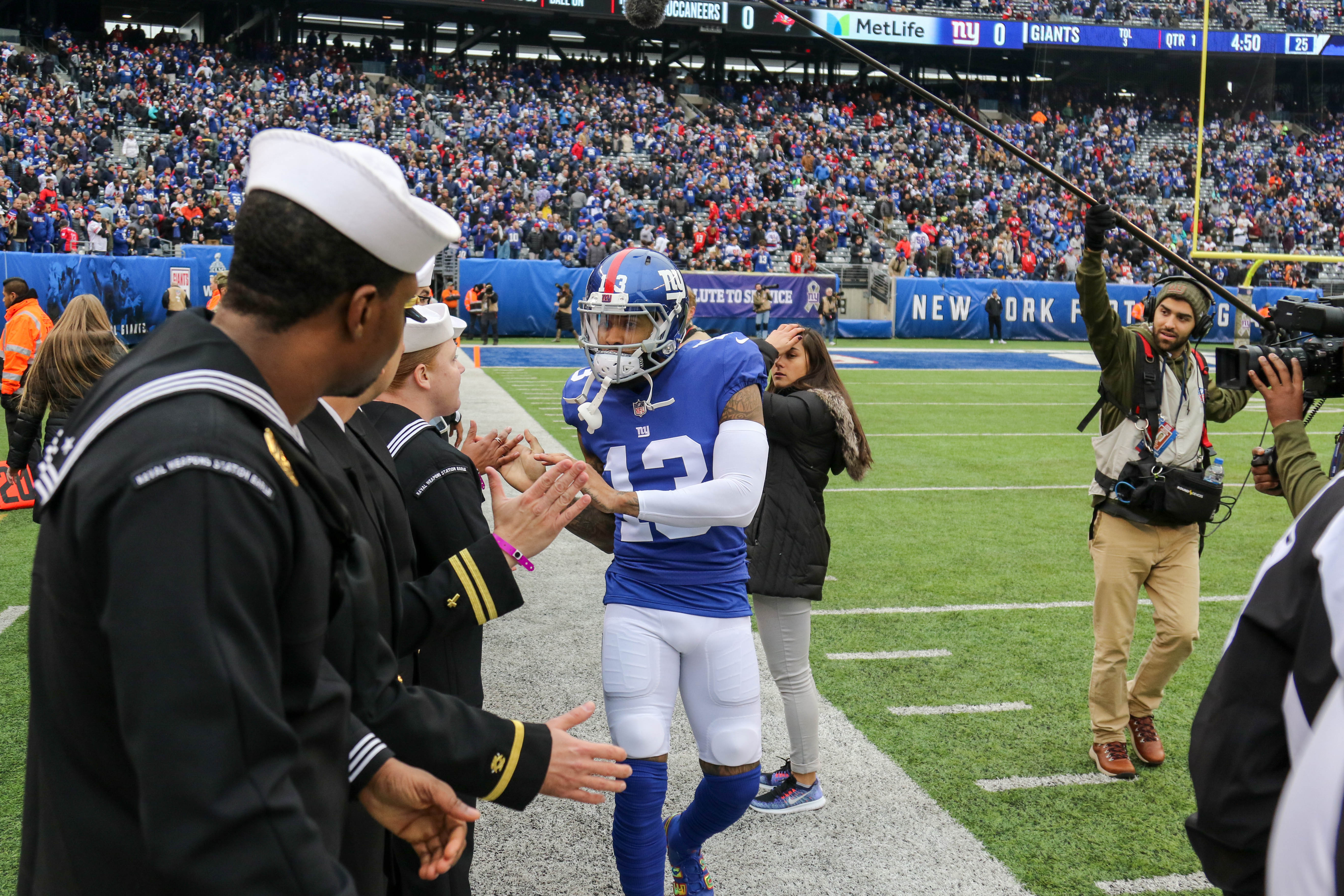
Beckham greeting US military personnel before the start of a game in 2018

On August 27, 2018, Beckham signed a five-year, $95 million contract extension with the Giants with $41 million fully guaranteed with a total of $65 million in guarantees. In his first game back from injury, he recorded 11 receptions for 111 yards in the season-opening 20–15 loss to the Jacksonville Jaguars. After the Week 3 27–22 win over the Houston Texans, Beckham surpassed Lionel Taylor (319) for the most receptions by a player through his first 50 career games with 337 catches (he would be passed by Michael Thomas in 2019). During Week 5 against the Panthers, Beckham threw a pass to rookie Saquon Barkley that went for a 57-yard touchdown. In addition, Beckham finished with eight receptions for 131 receiving yards as the Giants lost 31–33. He became the first player since David Patten in 2001 and only the fourth since 1950 to record a passing touchdown of at least 50 yards while having at least 100 receiving yards in the same game. In Week 7, on Monday Night Football, he had eight receptions for 143 yards and a touchdown in the 23–20 loss to the Falcons. He followed that up with eight receptions for 136 yards in a 20–13 loss to the Redskins. In Week 10 against the 49ers, Beckham had four catches for 73 yards and two touchdowns in the 27–23 win. In Week 13 against the Chicago Bears, Beckham had three catches for 35 yards and a touchdown. He also threw a 49-yard touchdown pass to Russell Shepard in the 30–27 win. He became the first non-quarterback with multiple passing touchdowns in a season since Antwaan Randle El in 2010. In addition, he became the first player to record multiple games with a touchdown pass and a receiving touchdown in a single season since Eddie Kaw and Benny Boynton accomplished the feat for the 1924 Buffalo Bisons. Beckham was inactive for the final four games of the season due to a quad injury. He finished the season with 77 receptions, 1,052 yards, six touchdowns, and threw two passes for touchdowns. He was ranked 23rd by his fellow players on the NFL Top 100 Players of 2019.

=== Cleveland Browns ===
==== 2019 season ====
On March 13, 2019, Beckham was acquired by the Browns, along with Olivier Vernon, in exchange for Jabrill Peppers, Kevin Zeitler, and the Browns' first- and third-round picks in the 2019 NFL draft.

Beckham with the Cleveland Browns in 2019

In Beckham's first game with the Browns, he caught seven passes for 71 yards as the Browns lost at home to the Titans 43–13. In Week 2 against the Jets, Beckham finished with 161 receiving yards, including a one-handed grab for 33 yards and later, an 89-yard touchdown as the Browns won 23–3 in his first game back at MetLife Stadium since being traded.

In Week 4 against the Ravens, Beckham was limited to only two receptions for 20 yards in the 40–25 win. Late in the third quarter, Beckham threw a punch at Ravens' cornerback Marlon Humphrey who then responded by choking Beckham. After the game, Browns' head coach Freddie Kitchens was displeased with the fact that Humphrey was not ejected for choking Beckham and said that "they get away with it because it's Odell," but the Ravens released a close-up video after the game that showed Humphrey had two fists full of jersey and did not touch Beckham Jr.'s neck. After the game, Humphrey apologized to Beckham and said that his response to Beckham was not a brand of football he wanted to represent. On October 5, 2019, Beckham was fined $14,037, as was Humphrey.

In Week 6 against the Seahawks, Beckham caught six passes for 101 yards in the 32–28 loss. Days after the game, he was fined $14,037 by the NFL for uniform violation.

In Week 9, Beckham wore Joker-inspired cleats against the Denver Broncos, which violated the NFL's policy on cleat colors. He was required to change the cleats during halftime. In Week 12 against the Dolphins, Beckham caught six passes for 84 yards and his second touchdown of the season in the 41–24 win. On December 8, it was revealed that Beckham was battling with a sports hernia. In Week 17 against the Bengals, Beckham caught three passes for 81 yards and a touchdown in the 33–23 loss. During the game, Beckham surpassed 1,000 receiving yards on the season for the fifth time in his career. On January 21, 2020, Beckham underwent core muscle surgery. He was ranked 59th by his fellow players on the NFL Top 100 Players of 2020.

==== 2020 season ====
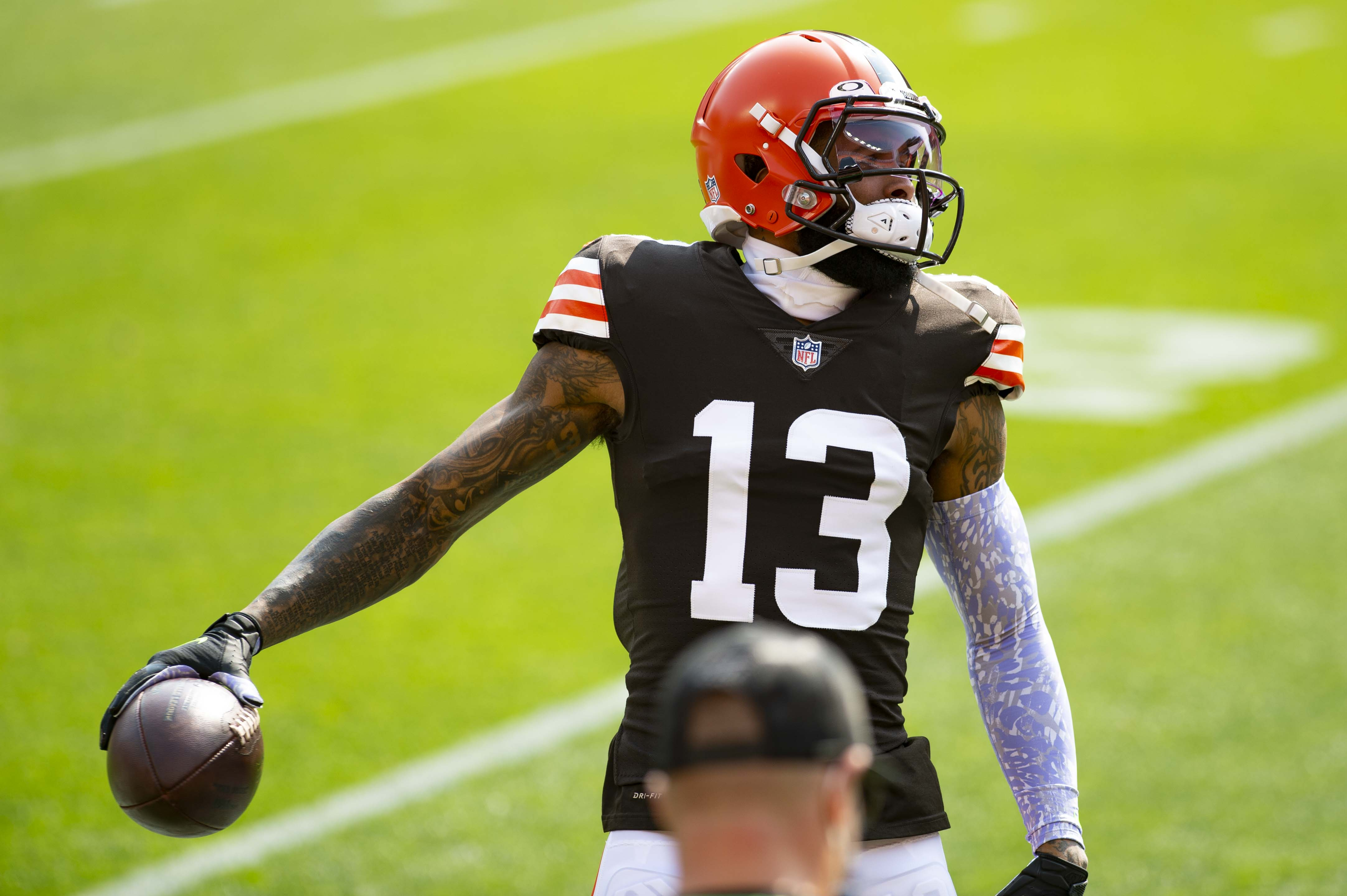
Beckham warming up before the start of a game in 2020

In Week 2 against the Bengals, Beckham caught four passes for 74 yards and his first receiving touchdown of the season during the 35–30 win. In Week 4, against the Cowboys, he had five receptions for 81 receiving yards and two receiving touchdowns to go along with 73 rushing yards and a rushing touchdown in the 49–38 victory, amassing 154 total yards and 3 touchdowns on the day. The rushing touchdown occurred late in the fourth quarter as the Browns were trying to stop a furious comeback attempt by the Cowboys. The touchdown helped put the Browns up by 11, effectively sealing the game. In Week 7 against the Bengals, Beckham left the game in the first quarter with a knee injury and did not return after trying to tackle Darius Phillips following an interception. The next day, it was revealed that Beckham suffered a torn ACL, prematurely ending his season. He was placed on injured reserve on October 27, 2020. Beckham finished the 2020 season with 23 catches for 319 yards and three receiving touchdowns plus three rushes for 72 yards and a rushing touchdown in seven games played.

==== 2021 season ====
After being excused from two practices earlier in the week following outrage on social media by Beckham's father over the way Beckham was being used in the Browns offense, the Browns released a statement on November 5, 2021, saying that they would be releasing Beckham. He was waived on November 8.

=== Los Angeles Rams ===
Beckham signed a one-year deal with the Los Angeles Rams on November 11, 2021. Beckham played in eight regular season games for the Rams in 2021. He scored a touchdown in five of the games. He finished the season with 44 receptions for 537 receiving yards to go along with the five touchdowns.

Beckham scored his first career playoff touchdown on January 17, 2022, in the Wild Card Game against the Arizona Cardinals. In the NFC Championship Game, Beckham caught nine passes for 113 yards in the 20–17 win against the 49ers, helping the Rams advance to Super Bowl LVI. Beckham had a key reception for a first down on the fourth-quarter drive to help set up the Rams' game-tying field goal.

In the Super Bowl against the Bengals, Beckham scored the game's first touchdown, a 17-yard reception. However, Beckham left the game in the second quarter with a knee injury and did not return. The Rams would hang on to win 23–20, earning Beckham his first career Super Bowl championship. The next day, it was revealed that Beckham suffered a torn ACL, less than a year and a half since he first tore it with Cleveland in October 2020, coincidentally also against the Bengals. He was ranked 90th by his fellow players on the NFL Top 100 Players of 2022.

Beckham spent the off-season recovering from his ACL injury, and there was significant speculation about whether he would re-sign with Los Angeles or sign with another team. Despite still being unsigned by a team, Beckham participated in the Rams' championship banner ceremony before their opening night game against the Buffalo Bills at SoFi Stadium on September 8, 2022. Ultimately, Beckham did not sign with a team during the 2022 season.

=== Baltimore Ravens ===
On April 9, 2023, Beckham signed a one-year contract with the Baltimore Ravens. He caught his first touchdown with the Ravens on his 31st birthday in a 37–3 Week 9 rout of the Seattle Seahawks. In Week 11, he had four receptions for 116 yards, which was his first 100+ yard receiving game since 2021, in a 34–20 victory over the Cincinnati Bengals. In the 2023 season, he appeared in 14 games and started six. He recorded 35 receptions for 565 receiving yards and three receiving touchdowns. On March 13, 2024, Beckham was released by the Ravens.

=== Miami Dolphins ===
On May 8, 2024, Beckham signed a one-year contract with the Miami Dolphins. He was placed on the reserve/PUP list to begin the season after needing surgery to address an unspecified injury. He was activated on October 5.

On December 13, Beckham and the Dolphins mutually agreed for Beckham to be waived. Prior to his release, he played in nine games, totaling nine catches for 55 yards.

On October 7, 2025, Beckham was suspended for six games of the 2025 NFL season for violating the league's policy on performance-enhancing drugs.

=== New York Giants (second stint) ===
On April 20, 2026, Beckham worked out for the New York Giants. On June 1, Beckham re-signed with the Giants, reuniting him with head coach John Harbaugh, whom he played for in 2023 in Baltimore. On September 29, 2026, the Giants waived Beckham. Prior to his release, he played in three games with no catches.

=== Minnesota Vikings ===
On October 7, 2026, Beckham was signed to the Minnesota Vikings practice squad. On November 9, Beckham was signed to the Vikings active roster and released the next day. On November 12, he was re-signed to the Vikings practice squad.

== Career statistics ==
=== NFL ===
Legend
	Won the Super Bowl
**Bold**	Career high

==== Regular season ====
Year	Team	Games		Receiving					Rushing					Fumbles	
Year	Team	GP	GS	Rec	Yds	Avg	Lng	TD	Att	Yds	Avg	Lng	TD	Fum	Lost
2014	NYG	12	11	91	1,305	14.3	80	12	**7**	35	5.0	13	0	1	**1**
2015	NYG	15	15	96	**1,450**	15.1	87	**13**	1	3	3.0	3	0	2	0
2016	NYG	**16**	**16**	**101**	1,367	13.5	75	10	1	9	9.0	9	0	**3**	**1**
2017	NYG	4	2	25	302	12.1	48	3	1	8	8.0	8	0	0	0
2018	NYG	12	12	77	1,052	13.7	51	6	5	19	3.8	11	0	2	**1**
2019	CLE	**16**	15	74	1,035	14.0	**89T**	4	3	10	3.3	11	0	1	**1**
2020	CLE	7	7	23	319	13.9	43	3	3	**72**	**24.0**	**50T**	**1**	0	0
2021	CLE	6	6	17	232	13.6	26	0	2	14	7.0	10	0	0	0
2021	LAR	8	7	27	305	11.3	54T	5	0	0	0.0	0	0	0	0
2023	BAL	14	6	35	565	**16.1**	51	3	0	0	0.0	0	0	1	**1**
2024	MIA	9	0	9	55	6.1	11	0	0	0	0.0	0	0	0	0
2026	NYG	3	0	0	0	0.0	0	0	0	0	0.0	0	0	0	0
Career		122	97	575	7,987	13.9	89T	59	23	170	7.4	50T	1	10	5

==== Postseason ====
Year	Team	Games		Receiving					Fumbles	
Year	Team	GP	GS	Rec	Yds	Avg	Lng	TD	Fum	Lost
2016	NYG	1	1	4	28	7.0	11	0	0	0
2020	CLE	0	0	Did not play due to injury						
2021	LAR	**4**	**4**	**21**	**288**	**13.7**	**35**	**2**	0	0
2023	BAL	2	1	4	34	8.5	12	0	0	0
Career		7	6	29	350	12.1	35	2	0	0

=== College ===
Season	Team	GP	Receiving					Rushing				Punt returns				Kickoff returns			
Season	Team	GP	Rec	Yds	Avg	Lng	TD	Att	Yds	Avg	TD	Ret	Yds	Avg	TD	Ret	Yds	Avg	TD
2011	LSU	**14**	41	475	11.6	52	2	2	19	9.5	0	9	77	8.6	0	5	120	24.0	0
2012	LSU	13	43	713	16.6	56	2	—	—	—	—	**35**	**320**	**9.1**	**2**	5	79	15.8	0
2013	LSU	13	**59**	**1,152**	**19.5**	**63**	**8**	**5**	**58**	**11.6**	0	18	160	8.9	0	**32**	**845**	**26.4**	0
Career		40	143	2,340	16.4	63	12	7	77	11.0	0	62	557	9.0	2	42	1,044	24.9	0

== Career highlights ==
=== Awards and honors ===
NFL

- Super Bowl champion (LVI)
- 2× Second-team All-Pro (2015, 2016)
- 3× Pro Bowl (2014, 2015, 2016)
- AP NFL Offensive Rookie of the Year (2014)
- PFWA Rookie of the Year (2014)
- PFWA Offensive Rookie of the Year (2014)
- Sporting News Rookie of the Year (2014)
- NFL Moment of the Year (2014)
- Ranked No. 32 in the NFL Top 100 Players of 2015
- Ranked No. 10 in the NFL Top 100 Players of 2016
- Ranked No. 8 in the NFL Top 100 Players of 2017
- Ranked No. 77 in the NFL Top 100 Players of 2018
- Ranked No. 23 in the NFL Top 100 Players of 2019
- Ranked No. 59 in the NFL Top 100 Players of 2020
- Ranked No. 90 in the NFL Top 100 Players of 2022
- 37th greatest New York Giant of all-time

College

- Paul Hornung Award (2013)
- First-team All-American (2013)
- First-team All-SEC (2013)

=== Records ===
==== New York Giants franchise records ====
- Most receiving yards in a season, rookie: 1,305
- Most receptions in a season, rookie: 91 (tied with Saquon Barkley)
- Most receptions in a game by a rookie wide receiver: 12 (2014 season: Week 15 vs. Washington Redskins and Week 17 vs. Philadelphia Eagles)
- Most games with at least 50 receiving yards, rookie, season: 9
- Most games with at least 75 receiving yards, rookie, season: 9
- Most games with at least 100 receiving yards, rookie, season: 7
- Most games with at least 125 receiving yards, rookie, season: 6
- Most games with at least 150 receiving yards, rookie, season: 2
- Most games with at least ten receptions, rookie, season: 4
- Most games with at least two receiving touchdowns, rookie, season: 4
- Consecutive games with at least ten receptions: 2
- Most receiving yards at home, rookie, season: 767
- Most receptions at home, rookie, season: 52
- Highest average receiving yards per game, season: 108.8
- Highest receiving yards per catch (min. 50 catches), rookie, season: 14.34
- Most receiving touchdowns in a game, rookie: 3 (2014, Week 15 vs. Washington Redskins)

==== NFL records ====
- Fastest to reach 100 career receptions: 14 games
- Fastest to reach 150 career receptions: 21 games
- Fastest to reach 200 career receptions: 30 games
- Fastest to reach 250 career receptions: 38 games (tied with Michael Thomas)
- Fastest to reach 3,000 career receiving yards: 30 games
- Fastest to reach 3,500 career receiving yards: 36 games
- Fastest to reach 4,000 career receiving yards: 42 games (tied with Lance Alworth)
- Most games with at least 125 receiving yards in first three seasons: 13
- Most receptions in first 15 games of career: 110
- Most consecutive games with at least 90 receiving yards: 9 (2014, tied with Michael Irvin)
- Most consecutive games with at least 130 receiving yards and one touchdown: 4 (tied with Patrick Jeffers and Calvin Johnson)
- Most games with at least ten receptions, rookie, season: 4
- Most games with at least ten receptions, 100 receiving yards, rookie, season: 4
- Most games with at least 125 receiving yards, rookie, season: 6
- Most receptions at home, rookie, season: 52
- Most receiving yards in any calendar month, rookie: 606 yards (December 2014)
- Highest average receiving yards per game, rookie, season: 108.8
- Only player in NFL history to have at least 1,300 receiving yards while playing in 12 or fewer games in season

== Personal life ==
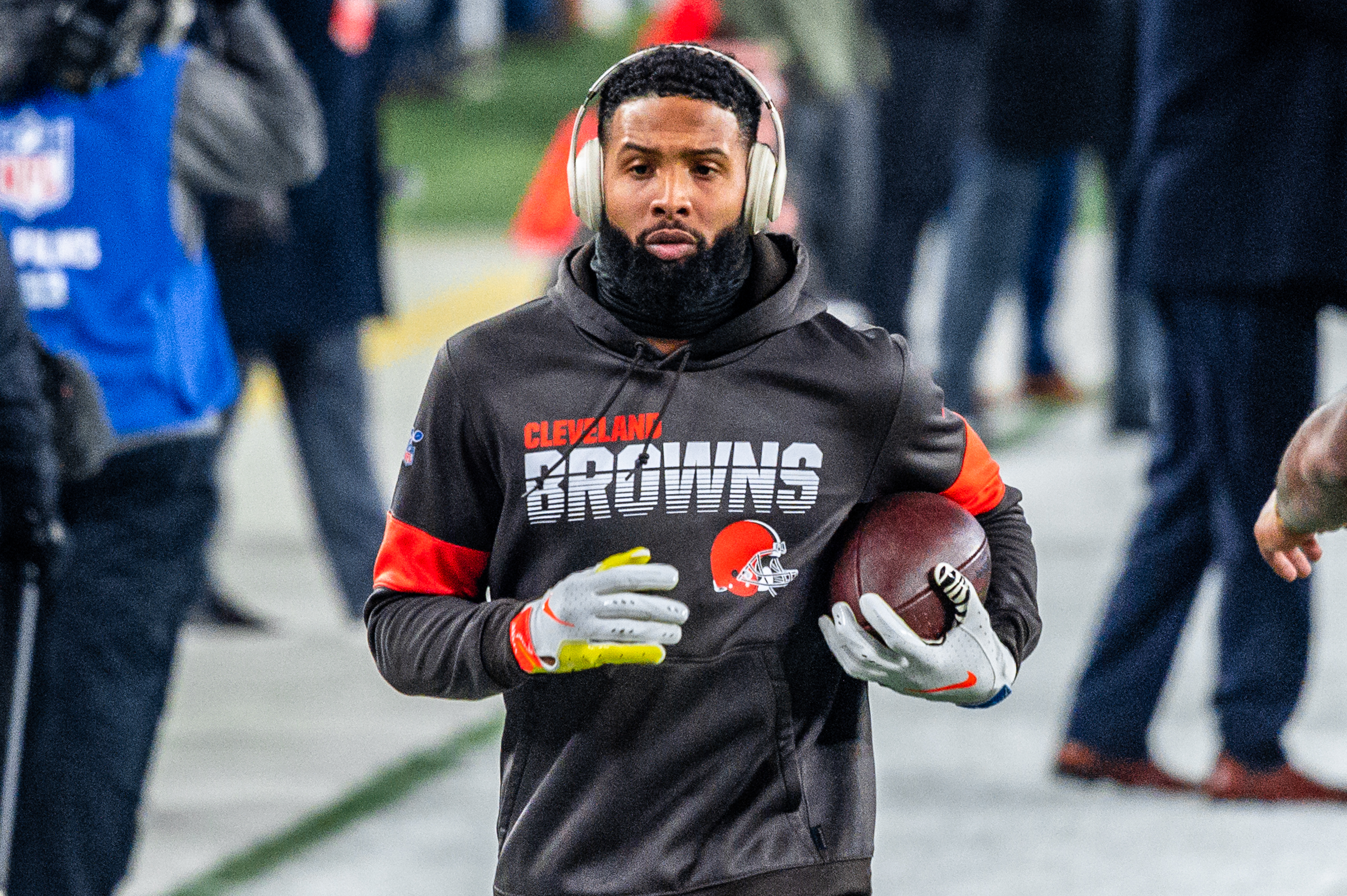
Beckham in 2019

Beckham has a younger brother and a younger sister. In 2024, Beckham’s brother, Kordell Beckham, became the winner of reality dating competition show Love Island USA season 6. Beckham's father, Odell Beckham Sr., was a standout running back at Marshall High School in Marshall, Texas, and played running back at LSU from 1989 to 1992. Beckham Sr. was also mentioned in Buzz Bissinger's 1990 book Friday Night Lights: A Town, a Team, and a Dream. Beckham's mother, Heather Van Norman, also attended LSU as a track runner. In 1993, she ran for three national championship relay teams, winning the events of indoor and outdoor 4 × 400 m and the outdoor 4 × 100 m relay. When Van Norman found out she was pregnant with Beckham in 1992, she was in the midst of training for the Olympic trials. She later became the coach of the Nicholls State University track and field team. She resigned from this position on June 1, 2017. After the NFL Combine, Beckham planned on challenging Van Norman to a race in the 40-yard dash. Beckham is or has been friends with many celebrities, including David Beckham (no relation), James Corden, Beyoncé, LeBron James, Drake, and David Alaba, who is also his favorite soccer player.

Beckham is a Christian. In the summer of 2018, Beckham was baptized in the Jordan River.

On January 29, 2015, during a live ESPN broadcast from Glendale, Arizona, Beckham partnered with New Orleans Saints quarterback Drew Brees to establish a new world record for the most one-handed catches made in a minute. He shattered the previous record of 10 as he caught 33 passes. However, this achievement was short lived as CFL wide receiver Andy Fantuz recorded 50 one-handed catches in a minute to set the new world record.

On February 17, 2022, Beckham and his then-partner Lauren Wood's first child, a son, was born.

On November 27, 2022, Beckham refused to put on his seatbelt and was escorted off an American Airlines flight before it left Miami bound for Los Angeles. The crew tried to wake him up but said that he was unresponsive and "appeared to be coming in and out of consciousness". The plane returned to the gate, where he refused to deplane, whereupon all passengers were required to deplane and he was escorted off the plane by Miami-Dade Police. He was later banned from all future flights on American Airlines.

On September 16, 2025, Beckham was announced to be part of Baller League USA, a new indoor six-a-side soccer competition, as a manager for one of the teams in the league later known as Showtime FC.

== Charity ==
Beckham has raised money and awareness for several topics, including cancer research, feeding hungry Americans, damage done by Hurricane Harvey and severe floods, and the Make-A-Wish Foundation.

- In September 2016, there was major flooding in Beckham's home state of Louisiana. He donated $500,000 of his own jersey sales to repair efforts.
- In Week 13 of the 2016 NFL season, Beckham wore Make-A-Wish Foundation cleats to raise awareness for their cause.
- In July 2017, Beckham was contacted over social media about a nine-year-old boy, Jayro Ponce, struggling with cancer. Beckham was told that he was Jayro's favorite player. He flew in and spent the day with him, while also raising awareness for the child's situation.
- In September 2017, Beckham donated $100,000 of his own money to Americares and Samaritan's Purse, who then used the money to aid those who were affected by Hurricane Harvey. He later shared a link to the public to open public donations to help aid efforts.
- In October 2018, Beckham worked with ShopRite Partners In Caring and Crest to raise money for ShopRite's cause of feeding hungry Americans. The event was a fan meet-and-greet where for every selfie taken, Crest would make a donation to ShopRite. Beckham took 250 selfies in under 20 minutes.

== Sponsorships ==
In May 2017, Beckham and Nike signed the largest endorsement contract in NFL history worth $25 million over five years. The contract includes incentives allowing Beckham to extend it to eight years and $48 million.

Beckham also has sponsorship deals with Head & Shoulders, Foot Locker, Lenovo, and Daniel Wellington.

== Business interests ==
Beckham has invested in a number of startups, including in the esports and fintech industries. In March 2021, Beckham became a strategic advisor to a SPAC sponsored by Tribe Capital.

== Filmography ==
Beckham has been involved with a number of television productions. In 2015, he was part of Catching Odell, which was a TV movie that gave a behind-the-scenes point of view at his preparations and training for the upcoming season. In 2016, he made his television debut in Code Black. In 2018, alongside his then-Giants teammate Brad Wing, he appeared in the music video for the Nicki Minaj and Ariana Grande song "Bed".

FilmTelevision series
Year	Title	Role	Notes
2023	House Party	Himself	Cameo
Year	Title	Role	Notes
2015	Catching Odell	Himself	TV movie
2016	Code Black	Himself	Episode: "Hail Mary"
2019	Ballers	Himself	3 Episodes

Music videos
Year	Title	Artist	Role
2017	"Flipmode"	Fabolous, Velous and Chris Brown	Himself
2018	"Bed"	Nicki Minaj featuring Ariana Grande	Himself
2020	"Laugh Now Cry Later"	Drake featuring Lil Durk	Himself
