= Shane Smith (American football) =

American football player (born 1993)

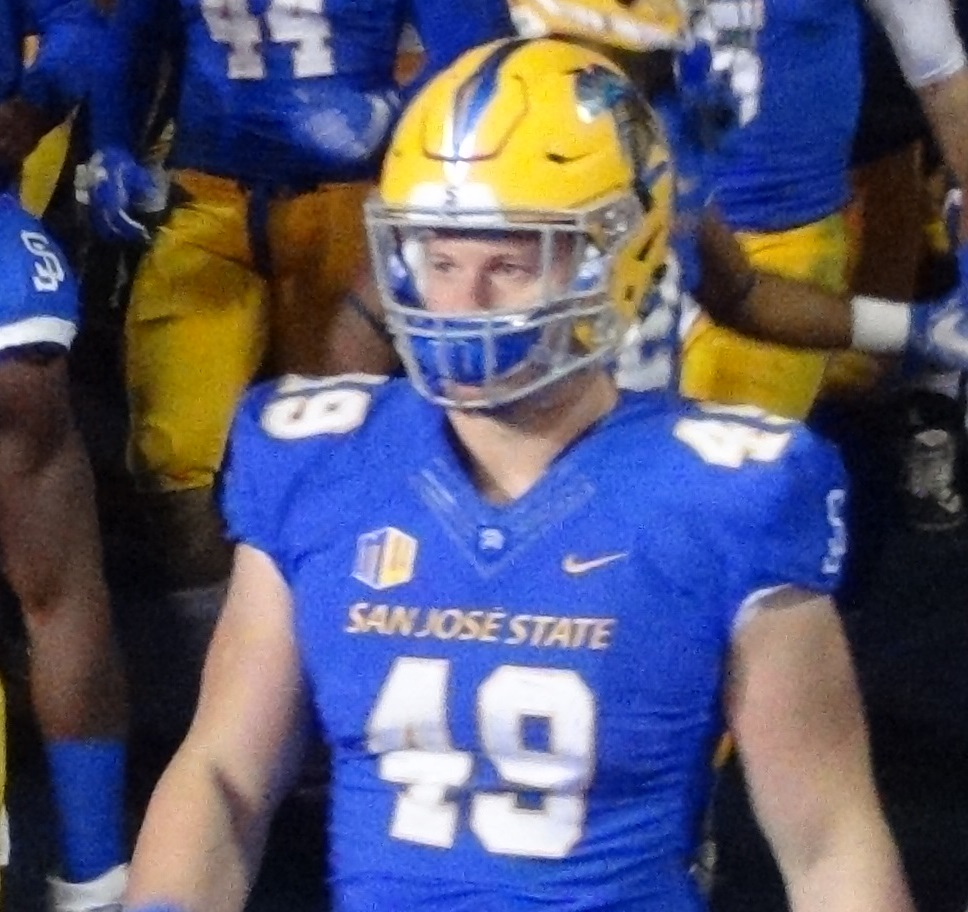
- Smith in 2016.

No. 43
- Position: Fullback

Personal information
- Born: August 21, 1993 (age 33); Santa Clara, California, U.S.
- Listed height: 6 ft 1 in (1.85 m)
- Listed weight: 240 lb (109 kg)

Career information
- High school: Los Gatos (Los Gatos, California)
- College: San Jose State
- NFL draft: 2017: undrafted

Career history
- New York Giants (2017–2018); New Orleans Saints (2019)*
- * Offseason or practice squad member only
- Stats at Pro Football Reference

Shane Kristofer Smith (born August 24, 1993) is an American former football fullback. He attended college at San Jose State.

== Early life and college career ==
Born in Santa Clara, California, and raised in nearby Los Gatos, Smith attended Los Gatos High School and San José State University. With the San Jose State Spartans football team, Smith redshirted the 2012 season as a linebacker and played at running back and fullback from 2013 to 2016. During the 2015 season, Smith played mostly as a blocker for running back Tyler Ervin, who set a school single-season rushing record of 1,601 yards. Smith had far more receiving than rushing yards, accumulating only 18 rushing yards on eight attempts compared to 189 yards on 16 receptions, including two touchdowns.

== Professional career ==
=== New York Giants ===
Smith signed with the New York Giants as an undrafted free agent following the 2017 NFL draft. He played in the first three games after making the team's 53-man roster, starting two, before being waived on September 28, 2017, and signed to the practice squad the next day. He was promoted back to the active roster on November 11, 2017. In his rookie season, Smith played in 11 games with four starts, playing mostly as a blocker.

On September 19, 2018, Smith was waived by the Giants.

=== New Orleans Saints ===
On August 11, 2019, Smith was signed by the New Orleans Saints. He was waived during final roster cuts on August 30, 2019. He was suspended by the NFL for four weeks on October 9, 2019. He was reinstated from suspension on November 6, 2019.
