= Zachary High School =

Location
- 4100 Bronco Lane; Zachary, Louisiana; United States; 30°39′12″N 91°9′38″W

Information
- Type: Public
- School district: Zachary Community School Board (2002 - Present); East Baton Rouge Parish School System (1880 - 2002)
- Principal: Tim Jordan
- Teaching staff: 105.92 (FTE)
- Grades: 9 - 12
- Enrollment: 1,784 (2023-2024)
- Student to teacher ratio: 16.84
- Colors: Columbia blue, red, white, and black
- Athletics conference: District 4-5A (LHSAA)
- Mascot: Bucky the Bronco
- Nickname: Broncos
- Rivals: Baker Buffaloes; Central Wildcats; Scotlandville Hornets; Catholic Bears
- Website: https://zacharyhigh.org/

Zachary High School is a public high school located in Zachary, Louisiana, United States. It is a part of the Zachary Community School Board.

== History ==
Zachary High School was established in 1912. It was segregated. The Rosenwald Fund helped establish a school for African Americans, Zachary Colored School, in 1934, but there was no public high school open to African Americans in Zachary until 1954. Zachary High School desegregated in the 1970s.

Zachary High School was within the East Baton Rouge Parish School System. In 2002, Zachary High School became part of the Zachary Community School District. Since the break from East Baton Rouge Parish, the Zachary High School campus has been renovated. Zachary High School now has a newly built freshman academy, gym, ROTC building, Industrial Arts Building, agriscience complex, Academic Athletic Center, and Hard Work Cafe. Zachary High school also has a stadium with an artificial turf field that holds five thousand people.

== Academics ==
Three teachers at the school were named Louisiana Teacher of the Year. Mrs. Cathy Raziano, who was selected as Louisiana's 2003-2004 Teacher of the Year, Dr. Carol Price, a math teacher, was honored as 2007-2008 Teacher of the Year, and Mrs. Britni Matthews, an English honors teacher who was honored as Louisiana's 2020-2021 Teacher of the Year.

The class of 2010 was the first to be initiated into the "Freshman Academy." The Freshman Academy is designed to help freshman successfully develop and adapt to high school work and life.

Zachary High School is one of three high schools in Louisiana to have the Oracle Computer Database Building program, which costs over $3000. Neighboring and rival school, West Feliciana High School, located in St. Francisville, LA, also has the Oracle Computer Database Building Program.

== Athletics ==
Zachary High athletes compete in varsity level sports in the LHSAA.

Sports include baseball, softball, boys' and girls' track and field, boys' and girls' cross country, boys' and girls' soccer, golf, bowling, swimming, wrestling, boys' and girls' basketball, boys' and girls' weightlifting, football, tennis, and volleyball.

=== Baseball ===
Zachary won consecutive Louisiana 4A baseball state championships in 2007, 2008 and 2009. Zachary was 2013 state runner-up under Coach Jesse Cassard.

=== Girls' cross country ===
ZHS girls' cross country won district championships in 2005, 2006, 2007, and 2008.

=== Football ===
==== Championships ====
The Zachary High football team has won four State Championships in: 2015, 2017, 2018 and 2021.

==== Coaches ====
The Zachary High football team was under Coach Neil Weiner from 2009 to 2013. He turned the team around from a 3-7 record in his first season in 2009 to a 12-3 record the following season in 2010 and was also District 5-5A co-champions.

David Brewerton has been head coach since 2014. In his first season, he coached Zachary to a 14-1 record. He also coached Zachary to 2015, 2017, 2018 and 2021 5A state championships including an undefeated 15-0 record in 2021.

=== Boys' soccer ===
The boys' soccer team was 2007 6-4A District runner-up and advanced to the quarterfinals of the state tournament.

== Band ==
The wind ensemble was selected to play at Carnegie Hall at the 2007 National Youth Concert. The "Band of Blue" has played at the BGA Peach Bowl, the BGA Sugar Bowl, 2013 Outback Bowl, and at the National Independence Day Parade in Washington, D.C. Individual musicians have been selected to play in All-South, All-State (concert and jazz), All-District, All-Parish (concert and jazz), and Ark-La-Tex. Individual musicians have also been selected to participate in the High School Honors Performance Series at Carnegie Hall and the High School Honors Performance Series at Sydney Opera House. The Zachary High School Band has been honored for their outstanding performances at the district concert and state concert series throughout the years. They compete annually in the Northwestern State University and Dutchtown High School marching festivals. The jazz band competes annually at Loyola University. The Zachary High Concert Band was honored with the Golden Mickey as the best band at the 2019 Festival Disney. The Zachary High Band Colorguard competes in the Winter Guard Series.

== Notable alumni ==
- Vic Stelly (1959), former member of the Louisiana House of Representatives
- John Kennedy (1969), US senator from Louisiana
- Victor Jones (1986), NFL running back
- Darwyn Williams (1988), former CEO of Environmental Waste Solutions
- Kedrick Brown (1999), NBA player
- Jeremy Richardson (2002), NBA player
- Zach Von Rosenberg (2009), MiLB player and college football punter
- Taylor Guilbeau (2011), MLB player
- Jameson Fisher (2012), MiLB player
- Boston Scott (2013), NFL running back
- Douglas Coleman III (2016), NFL safety
- Lindsey Scott Jr. (2016), UFL quarterback and college football coach
- Sean Burrell (2020), track & field athlete
- Tanner Hall (2020), MiLB player
- Chris Hilton Jr. (2021), NFL wide receiver
- Eli Holstein (2023), college football quarterback
- Trey'Dez Green (2024), college football tight end
