= 2022 Philadelphia Eagles season =

90th season in franchise history; fourth Super Bowl appearance

- Owner: Jeffrey Lurie
- General manager: Howie Roseman
- Head coach: Nick Sirianni
- Offensive coordinator: Shane Steichen
- Defensive coordinator: Jonathan Gannon
- Home stadium: Lincoln Financial Field

Results
- Record: 14–3
- Division place: 1st NFC East
- Playoffs: Won Divisional Playoffs (vs. Giants) 38–7; Won NFC Championship (vs. 49ers) 31–7; Lost Super Bowl LVII (vs. Chiefs) 35–38
- All-Pros: 6: C Jason Kelce (1st team); RT Lane Johnson (1st team); QB Jalen Hurts (2nd team); WR A. J. Brown (2nd team); OLB Haason Reddick (2nd team); CB James Bradberry (2nd team)
- Pro Bowlers: 8: Selected but did not play due to participation in Super Bowl LVII: QB Jalen Hurts; RB Miles Sanders; WR A. J. Brown; OT Lane Johnson; G Landon Dickerson; C Jason Kelce; OLB Haason Reddick; CB Darius Slay

Uniform
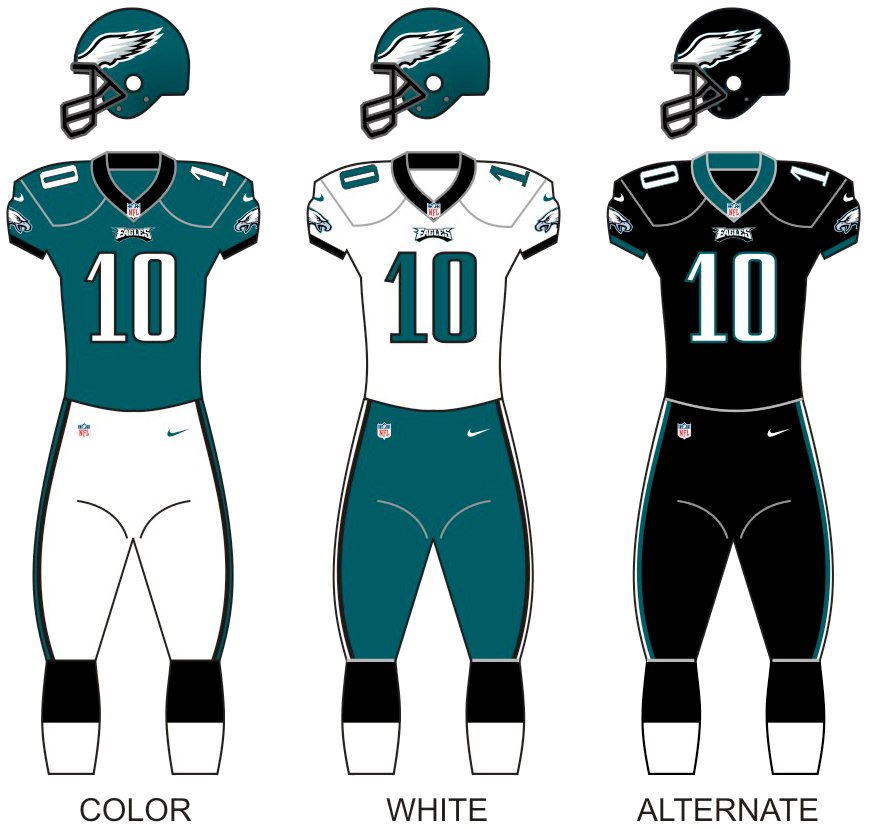

The 2022 season was the Philadelphia Eagles' 90th in the National Football League (NFL), their 20th playing home games at Lincoln Financial Field, their second under head coach Nick Sirianni, and seventh under general manager Howie Roseman since he returned to the position (twelfth overall). The Eagles started 8–0 for the first time in franchise history before their winning streak was snapped with a 32–21 upset loss to the Washington Commanders in Week 10. They improved on their 9–8 record from the prior year following a 40–33 victory over the Green Bay Packers in Week 12. With a 48–22 road win over their division rival New York Giants in Week 14, the Eagles clinched their second straight playoff berth, their fifth in six seasons. After a 25–20 road win over the Chicago Bears in Week 15, the Eagles matched their franchise-best 13–1 start in the 2004 season and secured their third 13-win season win in franchise history, along with 2004 and 2017. With a 22–16 win over the Giants in Week 18, the Eagles won the NFC East for the first time since 2019, and clinched the NFC's #1 seed for the first time since 2017. The Eagles also reached 14 regular season wins, a franchise record.

This season was defined by the emergence of third-year quarterback Jalen Hurts as well as a strong, well-balanced offensive and defensive performance by the Eagles. The Eagles offense finished second in total offense (389.1 yards per game), ninth in passing offense (241.5 yards per game), fifth in rushing offense (147.6 yards per game), second in total points (477 points scored) and third in scoring offense (28.1 points per game). The defense was just as dominant, finishing second in total defense (301.5 yards per game), first in passing defense (179.8 yards per game), eighth in scoring defense (20.2 points per game), and sixth in takeaways (27, with 17 interceptions and 10 fumble recoveries). The Eagles also produced 70 sacks, the most in the league and the third-most in NFL history, behind the 1984 Chicago Bears (72) and the 1989 Minnesota Vikings (71).

In the Divisional Round, the Eagles routed the Giants 38–7 for their first postseason win since 2018. With this win, Philadelphia completed a 3–0 sweep of all three games played against New York, and advanced to the NFC Championship for the first time since 2017. The Eagles went on to handily win the NFC Championship against the San Francisco 49ers 31–7, advancing to Super Bowl LVII where they would face the Kansas City Chiefs and former longtime head coach Andy Reid. Despite holding a 24–14 lead at halftime, the Eagles ultimately lost to the Chiefs by a score of 38–35.

== Roster changes ==
=== Free agents ===
Position	Player	Tag	2022 team	Notes
OLB	Genard Avery	UFA	Pittsburgh Steelers	1 year
C	Jason Kelce	UFA	Philadelphia Eagles	1 year, $14m
DE	Derek Barnett	UFA	Philadelphia Eagles	2 years, $14m
SS	Anthony Harris	UFA	Philadelphia Eagles	1 year, $2.5m
RB	Jordan Howard	UFA	New Orleans Saints	Practice Squad
FS	Rodney McLeod	UFA	Indianapolis Colts	
CB	Steven Nelson	UFA	Houston Texans	
DT	Hassan Ridgeway	UFA	San Francisco 49ers	1 year
TE	Jason Croom	UFA		
G	Nate Herbig	RFA	Philadelphia Eagles	1 year
RB	Boston Scott	RFA	Philadelphia Eagles	1 year, $1.8m
OLB	Alex Singleton	RFA	Denver Broncos	1 year
WR	Greg Ward	RFA	Philadelphia Eagles	1 year
CB	Andre Chachere	ERFA	Philadelphia Eagles	1 year

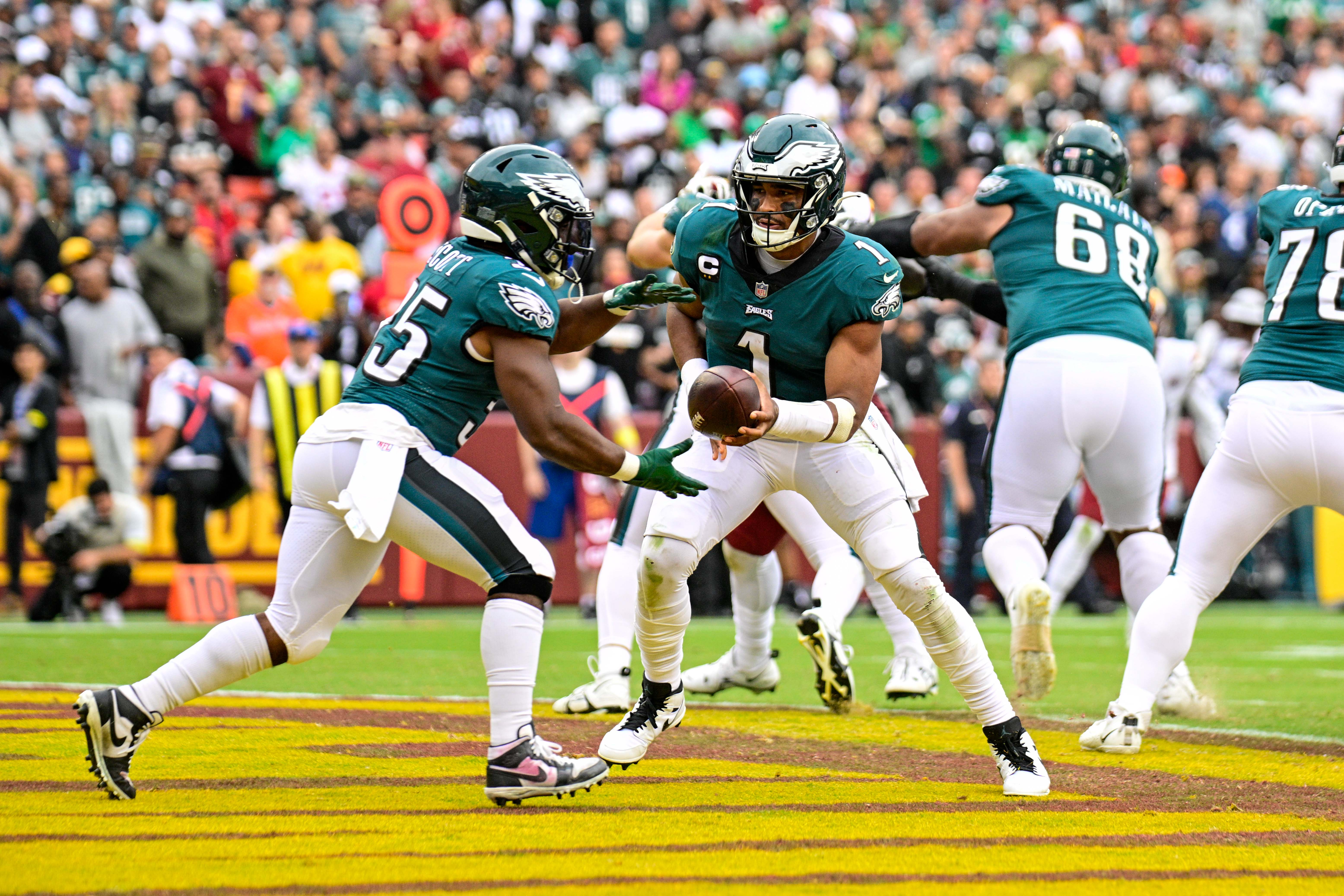
2022 Eagles

Player re-signed by the Eagles	Player signed by another team

=== Signings ===
Position	Player	Tag	2021 team	Date signed	Notes
OLB	Haason Reddick	UFA	Carolina Panthers	March 14	3 years, $45m
DT	Fletcher Cox	UFA	Philadelphia Eagles	March 19	1 year, $14m
WR	Zach Pascal	UFA	Indianapolis Colts	March 21	1 year, $1.5m
ILB	Kyzir White	UFA	Los Angeles Chargers	March 26	1 year, $5m
WR	Devon Allen	UFA	—	April 8	1 year, $705k
WR	Keric Wheatfall	UFA	—	May 16	3 year, $2.6m
WR	Josh Hammond	UFA	Jacksonville Jaguars	May 17	1 year, $705k
CB	James Bradberry	UFA	New York Giants	May 18	1 year, $10m
CB	Jimmy Moreland	UFA	Houston Texans	May 23	1 year, $965k
S	Jaquiski Tartt	UFA	San Francisco 49ers	June 17	1 year, $2.5m
DT	Kobe Smith	UFA	Tampa Bay Buccaneers	June 26	1 year, $705k
TE	Jaeden Graham	UFA	Atlanta Falcons	June 27	1 year, 895k
C	Cameron Tom	UFA	Miami Dolphins	June 27	1 year, $965k
WR	Lance Lenoir	UFA	Michigan Panthers	June 27	1 year, $825k
QB	Ian Book	WVR	New Orleans Saints	August 31	1 year
RB	Trey Sermon	WVR	San Francisco 49ers	September 1	1 year
DE	Janarius Robinson	UFA	Minnesota Vikings	September 13	1 year
DT	Linval Joseph	UFA	Los Angeles Chargers	November 16	1 year
DT	Ndamukong Suh	UFA	Tampa Bay Buccaneers	November 17	1 year

=== Departures ===
Position	Player	2022 team	Date	Reason
OG	Brandon Brooks	—N/a	January 26	Retired
DT	Fletcher Cox	Philadelphia Eagles	March 17	Released
OG	Nate Herbig	New York Jets	May 3	Released
OLB	Joe Ostman		May 23	Released
CB	Craig James	New York Jets	July 18	Released
WR	Josh Hammond	New England Patriots	June 26	Released
DT	Noah Elliss		June 26	Released
OT	Jarrid Williams		June 27	Released
DE	Ryan Kerrigan	—N/a	July 29	Retired
WR	Keric Wheatfall		August 11	Released
OG	William Dunkle	Pittsburgh Steelers	August 14	Released
LB	Ali Fayad	Toronto Argonauts	August 14	Released
WR	Lance Lenoir		August 16	Released
S	Jared Mayden		August 16	Released
CB	Jimmy Moreland	New York Jets	August 16	Released
CB	Josh Blackwell	Chicago Bears	August 23	Released
RB	DeAndre Torrey		August 23	Released
OT	Jarrid Williams	Philadelphia Eagles	August 23	Released
LB	Davion Taylor	Philadelphia Eagles	August 31	Released
DE	Tarron Jackson	Philadelphia Eagles	October 26	Released
S	Andre Chachere	Philadelphia Eagles	December 6	Released
OG	Sua Opeta	Philadelphia Eagles	January 6	Released

=== Trades ===
- April 28: The Eagles traded a first-round pick in the 2022 NFL draft and a third-round pick in the 2022 NFL draft to the Tennessee Titans for WR A. J. Brown.
- August 15: The Eagles traded TE J. J. Arcega-Whiteside to the Seattle Seahawks for S Ugo Amadi.
- August 24: The Eagles traded S Ugo Amadi and a seventh-round pick in the 2024 NFL draft to the Tennessee Titans for a sixth-round pick in the 2024 NFL draft.
- August 30: The Eagles traded a fifth-round pick in the 2023 NFL draft and a sixth-round pick in the 2024 NFL draft to the New Orleans Saints for S C. J. Gardner-Johnson and a seventh-round pick in the 2025 NFL draft.
- August 31: The Eagles traded WR Jalen Reagor to the Minnesota Vikings for a seventh-round pick in the 2023 NFL draft and a conditional fourth-round pick in the 2024 NFL draft.
- October 26: The Eagles traded a fourth-round pick in the 2023 NFL draft to the Chicago Bears for DE Robert Quinn.

== Draft ==
2022 Philadelphia Eagles Draft
Round	Selection	Player	Position	College	Notes
1	13	Jordan Davis	DT	Georgia	from Cleveland via Houston (Note: The Eagles traded a first-, a fourth- and two fifth-round selections (15th, 124th, 162nd and 166th overall) to the Houston Texans in exchange for a first-round selection (13th overall).)
1	15	Traded to Houston			from Miami (Note: The Eagles traded 2021 first (6th overall) and 2021 fifth (156th overall) round selections to the Miami Dolphins in exchange for a 2021 first round selection (12th overall), a 2021 fourth round selection (123rd overall), and 2022 first round selection.)
1	16	Traded to New Orleans (Note: The Eagles traded two first- and a sixth-round selection (16th, 19th and 194th overall) to the New Orleans Saints in exchange for first-, third- and seventh-round selections (18th, 101st and 237th overall), a 2023 first-round selection and a 2024 second-round selection.)			from Indianapolis (Note: The Eagles traded QB Carson Wentz to the Indianapolis Colts in exchange for a conditional second-round selection and a 2021 third-round selection. The conditional selection became a first-round selection (16th overall) because Wentz played 75% of Indianapolis' offensive snaps.)
1	18	Traded to Tennessee (Note: The Eagles traded first- and third-round selections (18th and 101st overall) to the Tennessee Titans in exchange for WR A. J. Brown.)			from New Orleans
1	19	Traded to New Orleans			
2	51	Cam Jurgens	C	Nebraska	
3	83	Nakobe Dean	LB	Georgia	
3	101	Traded to Tennessee			2020 Resolution JC-2A selection; from New Orleans
4	124	Traded to Houston			
5	154	Traded to Jacksonville (Note: The Eagles traded a fifth-round selection (154th overall) to the Jacksonville Jaguars in exchange for two sixth-round selections (188th and 198th overall).)			from Washington (Note: The Eagles traded 2021 sixth and seventh-round selections to the Washington Commanders in exchange for a fifth-round selection (154th overall).)
5	162	Traded to Houston			
5	166	Traded to Houston			from Arizona (Note: The Eagles traded TE Zach Ertz to the Arizona Cardinals in exchange for CB Tay Gowan and a fifth-round selection (166th overall).)
6	181	Kyron Johnson	DE	Kansas	from Detroit (Note: The Eagles traded sixth- and seventh-round selections (188th and 237th overall) to the Detroit Lions in exchange for a sixth-round selection (181st overall).)
6	188	Traded to Detroit			from Seahawks via Jaguars
6	194	Traded to New Orleans			from Indianapolis (Note: The Eagles traded G Matt Pryor and a seventh-round selection (240th overall) to the Indianapolis Colts in exchange for a sixth-round selection (194th overall).)
6	197	Traded to Jacksonville (Note: The Eagles traded a conditional sixth-round selection (197th overall) to the Jacksonville Jaguars in exchange for QB Gardner Minshew.)			
6	198	Grant Calcaterra	TE	SMU	from Pittsburgh via Jacksonville
6	206	Traded to Denver (Note: The Eagles traded a sixth-round selection (206th overall) to the Denver Broncos in exchange for CB Kary Vincent Jr.)			from Tampa Bay via NY Jets (Note: The Eagles traded QB Joe Flacco to the New York Jets in exchange for a conditional sixth-round selection (206th overall). The pick would have been elevated to the fifth round if Flacco had met playing time conditions.)
7	237	Traded to Detroit			from New Orleans
7	240	Traded to Indianapolis			

Draft trades

2022 Philadelphia Eagles undrafted free agents
Name	Position	College	Ref.
Josh Blackwell	CB	Duke	
Reed Blankenship	S	Middle Tennessee	
Kennedy Brooks	RB	Oklahoma	
Britain Covey	WR	Utah	
William Dunkle	G	San Diego State	
Noah Elliss	DT	Idaho	
Ali Fayad	LB	Western Michigan	
Mario Goodrich	CB	Clemson	
Josh Jobe	CB	Alabama	
Josh Sills	G	Oklahoma State	
Carson Strong	QB	Nevada	
DeAndre Torrey	RB	North Texas	
Jarrid Williams	OT	Miami (FL)	

== Staff ==
2022 Philadelphia Eagles staff
Front office: Chairman/CEO – Jeffrey Lurie; President – Don Smolenski; General manager/executive vice president – Howie Roseman; Assistant general manager – Alec Halaby; Assistant general manager – Jon Ferrari; Senior advisor to the general manager/chief security officer – Dom DiSandro; Director of football operations – Jeff Scott; Vice president of football administration – Jake Rosenberg; Vice president of football transactions and Strategic Planning – Bryce Johnston; Senior personnel director/advisor to the general manager – Matt Russell; Senior personnel director/advisor to the general manager – Dave Caldwell; Director of player development – Connor Barwin; Director of scouting – Brandon Hunt; Director of player personnel – Charles Walls; Director of player personnel – Alan Wolking; Director of draft management – Phil Bhaya; Director of pro scouting – Max Gruder; Assistant director of pro personnel – Jeremy Gray; Senior director of college scouting – Anthony Patch; Assistant director of college scouting – Ryan Myers; Director of football analytics – James Gilman; Assistant director of football analytics – Jon Liu; Head coaches: Head coach – Nick Sirianni; Assistant head coach/running backs – Jemal Singleton; Offensive coaches: Offensive coordinator – Shane Steichen; Passing game coordinator – Kevin Patullo; Quarterbacks – Brian Johnson; Assistant quarterbacks/offensive assistant – Alex Tanney; Wide receivers – Aaron Moorehead; Tight ends – Jason Michael; Run game coordinator/offensive line – Jeff Stoutland; Assistant offensive line – Roy Istvan; Offensive quality control – T. J. Paganetti; Offensive quality control – Eric Dickerson	Defensive coaches: Defensive coordinator – Jonathan Gannon; Defensive line – Tracy Rocker; Defensive ends/outside linebackers – Jeremiah Washburn; Linebackers – Nick Rallis; Defensive passing game coordinator/defensive backs – Dennard Wilson; Assistant defensive backs – D.K. McDonald; Defensive assistant – Tyler Scudder; Defensive quality control – Joe Kasper; Special teams coaches: Special teams coordinator – Michael Clay; Assistant special teams – Joe Pannunzio; Special teams quality control – Tyler Brown; Strength and conditioning: Vice president of player performance – Ted Rath; Head strength and conditioning – Fernando Noriega

== Final roster ==
2022 Philadelphia Eagles roster
Quarterbacks (QB): 19 Ian Book; 1 Jalen Hurts; 10 Gardner Minshew; Running backs (RB): 14 Kenneth Gainwell; 26 Miles Sanders; 35 Boston Scott; 34 Trey Sermon; Wide receivers (WR): 11 A. J. Brown; 18 Britain Covey; 3 Zach Pascal; 6 DeVonta Smith; 16 Quez Watkins; Tight ends (TE): 81 Grant Calcaterra; 88 Dallas Goedert; 89 Jack Stoll	Offensive linemen (OL): 69 Landon Dickerson LG; 77 Andre Dillard RT; 63 Jack Driscoll T; 65 Lane Johnson RT; 51 Cam Jurgens C; 62 Jason Kelce C; 68 Jordan Mailata LT; 56 Isaac Seumalo RG; Defensive linemen (DL): 91 Fletcher Cox DT; 90 Jordan Davis DT; 55 Brandon Graham DE; 97 Javon Hargrave DT; 72 Linval Joseph DT; 98 Robert Quinn DE; 74 Ndamukong Suh DT; 94 Josh Sweat DE; 93 Milton Williams DT	Linebackers (LB): 17 Nakobe Dean MLB; 57 T. J. Edwards MLB; 53 Christian Elliss OLB; 58 Kyron Johnson OLB; 48 Patrick Johnson OLB; 7 Haason Reddick OLB; 43 Kyzir White OLB; Defensive backs (DB): 32 Reed Blankenship FS; 24 James Bradberry CB; 22 Marcus Epps FS; 23 C. J. Gardner-Johnson SS; 28 Josh Jobe CB; 29 Avonte Maddox CB; 27 Zech McPhearson CB; 33 Josiah Scott CB; 2 Darius Slay CB; 42 K'Von Wallace SS; Special teams (ST): 4 Jake Elliott K; 13 Brett Kern P; 45 Rick Lovato LS; 8 Arryn Siposs P	Practice squad: 82 Devon Allen WR; 21 Andre Chachere FS; 85 Tyrie Cleveland WR; 31 Mario Goodrich CB; 41 Anthony Harris SS; 75 Tarron Jackson DE; 50 Fred Johnson T; -- Roderick Johnson LT; 66 Matt Leo DE (IPP); 37 Mac McCain CB; 78 Sua Opeta G; 76 Tyrese Robinson G; 52 Davion Taylor OLB; 83 Noah Togiai TE; 67 Cameron Tom C; 84 Greg Ward WR; 73 Marvin Wilson DT; Reserve: 96 Derek Barnett DE (IR); 54 Shaun Bradley MLB (IR); 80 Tyree Jackson TE (IR); 59 Janarius Robinson DE (IR); 61 Josh Sills G (Exempt); 64 Brett Toth LT (PUP); 95 Marlon Tuipulotu DT (IR); Rookies in italics 53 active, 7 reserve, 16 practice squad (1 exempt)

=== Team captains ===
- Jason Kelce (C)
- Lane Johnson (OT)
- Jalen Hurts (QB)
- Jake Elliott (K)
- Darius Slay (CB)
- Fletcher Cox (DT)
- Brandon Graham (DE)

== Preseason ==
Week	Date	Opponent	Result	Record	Venue	Recap
1	August 12	New York Jets	L 21–24	0–1	Lincoln Financial Field	Recap
2	August 21	at Cleveland Browns	W 21–20	1–1	First Energy Stadium	Recap
3	August 27	at Miami Dolphins	L 10–48	1–2	Hard Rock Stadium	Recap

== Regular season ==
=== Schedule ===
Week	Date	Opponent	Result	Record	Venue	Recap
1	September 11	at Detroit Lions	**W** 38–35	1–0	Ford Field	Recap
2	September 19	Minnesota Vikings	**W** 24–7	2–0	Lincoln Financial Field	Recap
3	September 25	at **Washington Commanders**	**W** 24–8	3–0	FedExField	Recap
4	October 2	Jacksonville Jaguars	**W** 29–21	4–0	Lincoln Financial Field	Recap
5	October 9	at Arizona Cardinals	**W** 20–17	5–0	State Farm Stadium	Recap
6	October 16	**Dallas Cowboys**	**W** 26–17	6–0	Lincoln Financial Field	Recap
7	Bye					
8	October 30	Pittsburgh Steelers	**W** 35–13	7–0	Lincoln Financial Field	Recap
9	November 3	at Houston Texans	**W** 29–17	8–0	NRG Stadium	Recap
10	November 14	**Washington Commanders**	**L** 21–32	8–1	Lincoln Financial Field	Recap
11	November 20	at Indianapolis Colts	**W** 17–16	9–1	Lucas Oil Stadium	Recap
12	November 27	Green Bay Packers	**W** 40–33	10–1	Lincoln Financial Field	Recap
13	December 4	Tennessee Titans	**W** 35–10	11–1	Lincoln Financial Field	Recap
14	December 11	at **New York Giants**	**W** 48–22	12–1	MetLife Stadium	Recap
15	December 18	at Chicago Bears	**W** 25–20	13–1	Soldier Field	Recap
16	December 24	at **Dallas Cowboys**	**L** 34–40	13–2	AT&T Stadium	Recap
17	January 1	New Orleans Saints	**L** 10–20	13–3	Lincoln Financial Field	Recap
18	January 8	**New York Giants**	**W** 22–16	14–3	Lincoln Financial Field	Recap

Note: Intra-division opponents are in bold text.

=== Game summaries ===
==== Week 1: at Detroit Lions ====
Week 1: Philadelphia Eagles at Detroit Lions – Game summary

Quarter	1	2	3	4	Total
**Eagles**	0	24	14	0	**38**
Lions	7	7	7	14	**35**

at Ford Field, Detroit, Michigan

- Date: September 11
- Game time: 1:00 p.m. EDT
- Game weather: None (indoor stadium)
- Game attendance: 64,537
- Referee: Brad Allen
- TV announcers (Fox): Adam Amin, Mark Schlereth and Kristina Pink
- Recap, Game Book

Game information

**First quarter**

- DET – Jamaal Williams 1-yard run (Austin Seibert kick), 10:18. Lions 7–0. **Drive: 9 plays, 75 yards, 4:42.**

**Second quarter**

- PHI – Jalen Hurts 1-yard run (Jake Elliott kick), 12:56. Tied 7–7. **Drive: 13 plays, 82 yards, 7:55.**
- PHI – Miles Sanders 1-yard run (Jake Elliott kick), 7:34. Eagles 14–7. **Drive: 8 plays, 66 yards, 2:10.**
- PHI – James Bradberry 27-yard interception return (Jake Elliott kick), 6:26. Eagles 21–7. **Drive: 2 plays, 1:08.**
- DET – D'Andre Swift 7-yard run (Austin Seibert kick), 1:55. Eagles 21–14. **Drive: 10 plays, 75 yards, 4:31.**
- PHI – Jake Elliott 23-yard field goal, 0:06. Eagles 24–14. **Drive: 9 plays, 73 yards, 1:49.**

**Third quarter**

- PHI – Kenneth Gainwell 2-yard run (Jake Elliott kick), 10:21. Eagles 31–14. **Drive: 10 plays, 82 yards, 4:39.**
- DET – Amon-Ra St. Brown 4-yard pass from Jared Goff (Austin Seibert kick), 4:09. Eagles 31–21. **Drive: 14 plays, 75 yards, 6:12.**
- PHI – Boston Scott 1-yard run (Jake Elliott kick), 1:41. Eagles 38–21. **Drive: 5 plays, 49 yards, 2:28.**

**Fourth quarter**

- DET – Jamaal Williams 1-yard run (Austin Seibert kick), 14:16. Eagles 38–28. **Drive: 6 plays, 75 yards, 2:25.**
- DET – D. J. Chark 22-yard pass from Jared Goff (Austin Seibert kick), 3:51. Eagles 38–35. **Drive: 11 plays, 72 yards, 4:28.**

**Top passers**

- PHI – Jalen Hurts – 18/32, 243 yards
- DET – Jared Goff – 21/37, 215 yards, 2 TD, INT

**Top rushers**

- PHI – Miles Sanders – 13 rushes, 96 yards, TD
- DET – D'Andre Swift – 15 rushes, 144 yards, TD

**Top receivers**

- PHI – A. J. Brown – 10 receptions, 155 yards
- DET – Amon-Ra St. Brown – 8 receptions, 64 yards, TD

For the third straight year, the Eagles were on the road to kick off the season. After the Lions scored on their opening drive, the Eagles would score 21 unanswered points. The Lions would try and rally with 21 points in the second half, but the Eagles would hang on and defeat the Lions for the second straight year. With the win, the Eagles started 1–0 for the ninth time since 2010 and for the second time under head coach Nick Sirianni.

==== Week 2: vs. Minnesota Vikings ====
Week 2: Minnesota Vikings at Philadelphia Eagles – Game summary

Quarter	1	2	3	4	Total
Vikings	0	7	0	0	**7**
**Eagles**	7	17	0	0	**24**

at Lincoln Financial Field, Philadelphia, Pennsylvania

- Date: September 19
- Game time: 8:30 p.m. EDT
- Game weather: Cloudy, 76 °F (24 °C)
- Game attendance: 69,879
- Referee: Scott Novak
- TV announcers (ABC): Joe Buck, Troy Aikman and Lisa Salters
- Recap, Game Book

Game information

**First quarter**

- PHI – Jalen Hurts 3-yard run (Jake Elliott kick), 9:09. Eagles 7–0. **Drive: 11 plays, 82 yards, 5:51.**

**Second quarter**

- PHI – Quez Watkins 53-yard pass from Jalen Hurts (Jake Elliott kick), 14:52. Eagles 14–0. **Drive: 7 plays, 82 yards, 3:27.**
- MIN – Irv Smith Jr. 2-yard pass from Kirk Cousins (Greg Joseph kick), 9:39. Eagles 14–7. **Drive: 9 plays, 75 yards, 5:13.**
- PHI – Jalen Hurts 26-yard run (Jake Elliott kick), 1:58. Eagles 21–7. **Drive: 7 plays, 85 yards, 3:02.**
- PHI – Jake Elliott 38-yard field goal, 0:00. Eagles 24–7. **Drive: 8 plays, 75 yards, 1:21.**

**Third quarter**

- No scoring plays.

**Fourth quarter**

- No scoring plays.

**Top passers**

- MIN – Kirk Cousins – 27/46, 221 yards, TD, 3 INT
- PHI – Jalen Hurts – 26/31, 333 yards, TD, INT

**Top rushers**

- MIN – Kirk Cousins – 2 rushes, 20 yards
- PHI – Miles Sanders – 17 rushes, 80 yards

**Top receivers**

- MIN – Adam Thielen – 4 receptions, 52 yards
- PHI – Dallas Goedert – 5 receptions, 82 yards

This week 2 matchup was thought to see two high powered offenses go at it in a possible high scoring affair. However, only the Eagles would show off their high powered offense. The Eagles would receive the ball and march down the field finishing with a 3 yard Jalen Hurts touchdown. Kicking off the second quarter, Jalen Hurts would connect with Quez Watkins on a 53 yard touchdown to double Philadelphia's lead to 14–0. The Vikings would counter that with a touchdown pass from Kirk Cousins to Irv Smith Jr. Later in the second quarter, Jalen Hurts would scramble and power his way in for a 26 yard touchdown (the longest from an Eagles QB since Donovan McNabb in 2002). The Eagles would close out the second quarter with a Jake Elliott 38 yard field goal. In the second half, the Eagles defense would step up and shut down the Vikings offense. The only glimmers of hope for Minnesota were a blocked field goal in the third quarter and a fourth-quarter interception by former Eagle Jordan Hicks; in both instances, however, each of the ensuing Vikings drives ended in Eagles interceptions. Despite no second half points from either team, the Eagles looked to be the dominant team. The Eagles would go on to win and have their first 2–0 start since 2016. Furthermore, this game was by far Jalen Hurts' best performance throwing the ball and claimed by many media members his possible "breakout game." Jalen would finish 26 of 31 for 333 yards 3 total touchdowns and 1 interception with a passer rating of 108.7.

==== Week 3: at Washington Commanders ====
Week 3: Philadelphia Eagles at Washington Commanders – Game summary

Quarter	1	2	3	4	Total
**Eagles**	0	24	0	0	**24**
Commanders	0	0	0	8	**8**

at FedExField, Landover, Maryland

- Date: September 25
- Game time: 1:00 p.m. EDT
- Game weather: Sunny, 72 °F (22 °C)
- Game attendance: 64,426
- Referee: Ronald Torbert
- TV announcers (Fox): Adam Amin, Mark Schlereth and Kristina Pink
- Recap, Game Book

Game information

**First quarter**

- No scoring plays.

**Second quarter**

- PHI – Jake Elliott 32-yard field goal, 14:53. Eagles 3–0. **Drive: 8 plays, 64 yards, 3:07.**
- PHI – Dallas Goedert 23-yard pass from Jalen Hurts (Jake Elliott kick), 13:18. Eagles 10–0. **Drive: 2 plays, 24 yards, 0:45.**
- PHI – A. J. Brown 9-yard pass from Jalen Hurts (Jake Elliott kick), 2:56. Eagles 17–0. **Drive: 6 plays, 64 yards, 2:49.**
- PHI – DeVonta Smith 2-yard pass from Jalen Hurts (Jake Elliott kick), 0:00. Eagles 24–0. **Drive: 1 play, 88 yards, 1:57.**

**Third quarter**

- No scoring plays.

**Fourth quarter**

- WSH – Boston Scott tackled in end zone by Daron Payne for a Safety, 14:06. Eagles 24–2.
- WSH – Antonio Gibson 1-yard run (pass failed), 1:55. Eagles 24–8. **Drive: 12 plays, 87 yards, 3:10.**

**Top passers**

- PHI – Jalen Hurts – 22/35, 340 yards, 3 TD
- WSH – Carson Wentz – 25/43, 211 yards

**Top rushers**

- PHI – Miles Sanders – 15 rushes, 46 yards
- WSH – Antonio Gibson – 12 rushes, 38 yards, TD

**Top receivers**

- PHI – DeVonta Smith – 8 receptions, 169 yards, TD
- WSH – Curtis Samuel – 7 receptions, 48 yards

In his first time facing the Eagles since being traded away from them, Carson Wentz was sacked 9 times and the Commanders only had 47 total yards of offense in the first half. Jalen Hurts threw for 300 yards in back-to-back games and threw touchdown passes to Dallas Goedert, A. J. Brown, and DeVonta Smith in the second quarter. The third touchdown to Smith to make the score 24–0 was on the last play of the 1st half on 4th and Goal from the 1-yard line. Smith finished with 8 receptions for 169 yards, and the Eagles won 24–8. They became the first NFC team to hit the 3–0 mark and was the first time they accomplished that feat in six years.

==== Week 4: vs. Jacksonville Jaguars ====
Week 4: Jacksonville Jaguars at Philadelphia Eagles – Game summary

Quarter	1	2	3	4	Total
Jaguars	14	0	0	7	**21**
**Eagles**	0	20	0	9	**29**

at Lincoln Financial Field, Philadelphia, Pennsylvania

- Date: October 2
- Game time: 1:00 p.m. EDT
- Game weather: Rain, 59 °F (15 °C)
- Game attendance: 69,879
- Referee: Shawn Hochuli
- TV announcers (CBS): Spero Dedes, Jay Feely and Aditi Kinkhabwala
- Recap, Game Book

Game information

**First quarter**

- JAX – Andre Cisco 59–yard interception return (Riley Patterson kick), 11:15. Jaguars 7–0.
- JAX – Jamal Agnew 4-yard pass from Trevor Lawrence (Riley Patterson kick), 3:50. Jaguars 14–0. **Drive: 8 plays, 80 yards, 4:32.**

**Second quarter**

- PHI – Jalen Hurts 3-yard run (Jake Elliott kick), 9:13. Jaguars 14–7. **Drive: 7 plays, 57 yards, 4:13.**
- PHI – Miles Sanders 10-yard run (Jake Elliott kick), 3:55. Tied 14–14. **Drive: 9 plays, 71 yards, 4:29.**
- PHI – Kenneth Gainwell 10-yard run (kick failed, wide right), 0:26. Eagles 20–14. **Drive: 8 plays, 35 yards, 2:34.**

**Third quarter**

- No scoring plays.

**Fourth quarter**

- PHI – Jake Elliot 28-yard field goal, 13:42. Eagles 23–14. **Drive: 11 plays, 78 yards, 5:35.**
- PHI – Miles Sanders 5-yard run (pass failed), 8:49. Eagles 29–14. **Drive: 6 plays, 24 yards, 3:17.**
- JAX – Jamal Agnew 8-yard pass from Trevor Lawrence (Riley Patterson kick), 7:19. Eagles 29–21. **Drive: 6 plays, 68 yards, 1:30.**

**Top passers**

- JAX – Trevor Lawrence – 11/23, 174 yards, 2 TD, INT
- PHI – Jalen Hurts – 16/25, 204 yards, INT

**Top rushers**

- JAX – Travis Etienne – 8 rushes, 32 yards
- PHI – Miles Sanders – 27 rushes, 134 yards, 2 TD

**Top receivers**

- JAX – Christian Kirk – 2 receptions, 60 yards
- PHI – A. J. Brown – 5 receptions, 95 yards

The Eagles hosted the Jacksonville Jaguars in a reunion with former Eagles head coach, Doug Pederson. Philadelphia entered the game as the lone unbeaten team in the league following the Miami Dolphins' loss to the Cincinnati Bengals the previous Thursday. The Jaguars jumped out to a quick 14–0 lead following a pick six by Andre Cisco and a 4 yard touchdown reception by Jamal Agnew. The Eagles rebounded with a dominant second quarter to take a 20–14 lead on touchdown runs by Jalen Hurts, Miles Sanders, and Kenneth Gainwell. The defense would also stymie Jacksonville throughout the game, forcing an interception and four Trevor Lawrence fumbles, including one that snuffed out any hope of a Jaguars comeback. With the 29–21 win, the Eagles improved to 4–0 for the first time since the 2004 season.

Also with this win, Philadelphia defeated Jacksonville for the fourth straight time. The Eagles took their first-ever lead in their all-time series with the Jaguars: now leading 4–3 after initially trailing 0–3.

==== Week 5: at Arizona Cardinals ====
Week 5: Philadelphia Eagles at Arizona Cardinals – Game summary

Quarter	1	2	3	4	Total
**Eagles**	7	7	3	3	**20**
Cardinals	0	10	0	7	**17**

at State Farm Stadium, Glendale, Arizona

- Date: October 9
- Game time: 4:25 p.m. EDT/1:25 p.m. MST
- Game weather: None (retractable roof closed)
- Game attendance: 63,919
- Referee: Tra Blake
- TV announcers (Fox): Chris Myers, Robert Smith and Jen Hale
- Recap, Game Book

Game information

**First quarter**

- PHI – Jalen Hurts 1–yard run (Cameron Dicker kick), 8:02. Eagles 7–0. **Drive: 11 plays, 64 yards, 4:13.**

**Second quarter**

- PHI – Jalen Hurts 1-yard run (Cameron Dicker kick), 10:11. Eagles 14–0. **Drive: 16 plays, 87 yards, 7:20.**
- ARI – Marquise Brown 25-yard pass from Kyler Murray (Matt Ammendola kick), 5:24. Eagles 14–7. **Drive: 6 plays, 57 yards, 2:16.**
- ARI – Matt Ammendola 20-yard field goal, 0:00. Eagles 14–10. **Drive: 16 plays, 91 yards, 3:22.**

**Third quarter**

- PHI – Cameron Dicker 42-yard field goal, 9:57. Eagles 17–10. **Drive: 10 plays, 51 yards, 5:03.**

**Fourth quarter**

- ARI – Eno Benjamin 11-yard run (Matt Ammendola kick), 9:43. Tied 17–17. **Drive: 12 plays, 90 yards, 5:37.**
- PHI – Cameron Dicker 23-yard field goal, 1:45. Eagles 20–17. **Drive: 17 plays, 70 yards, 7:58.**

**Top passers**

- PHI – Jalen Hurts – 26/36, 239 yards
- ARI – Kyler Murray – 28/42, 250 yards, TD, INT

**Top rushers**

- PHI – Jalen Hurts – 15 rushes, 61 yards, 2 TD
- ARI – James Conner – 9 rushes, 55 yards

**Top receivers**

- PHI – DeVonta Smith – 10 receptions, 87 yards
- ARI – Marquise Brown – 8 receptions, 78 yards, TD

The Eagles withstood a late rally by the Cardinals and improved to 5–0 on the season. This was Philadelphia's first win in Arizona since the 2001 season, as well as their first-ever win at State Farm Stadium.

==== Week 6: vs. Dallas Cowboys ====
Week 6: Dallas Cowboys at Philadelphia Eagles – Game summary

Quarter	1	2	3	4	Total
Cowboys	0	3	7	7	**17**
**Eagles**	0	20	0	6	**26**

at Lincoln Financial Field, Philadelphia, Pennsylvania

- Date: October 16
- Game time: 8:20 p.m. EDT
- Game weather: Clear, 63 °F (17 °C)
- Game attendance: 69,879
- Referee: John Hussey
- TV announcers (NBC): Mike Tirico, Cris Collinsworth and Melissa Stark
- Recap, Game Book

Game information

**First quarter**

- No scoring plays.

**Second quarter**

- PHI – Miles Sanders 5-yard run (Jake Elliott kick), 14:55. Eagles 7–0. **Drive: 15 plays, 80 yards, 7:36.**
- PHI – A. J. Brown 15-yard pass from Jalen Hurts (Jake Elliott kick), 10:40. Eagles 14–0. **Drive: 7 plays, 44 yards, 4:07.**
- PHI – Jake Elliott 51-yard field goal, 7:53. Eagles 17–0 **Drive: 4 plays, 1 yards, 1:31.**
- PHI – Jake Elliott 34-yard field goal, 1:47. Eagles 20–0 **Drive: 8 plays, 30 yards, 3:27.**
- DAL – Brett Maher 30-yard field goal, 0:29. Eagles 20–3. **Drive: 9 plays, 29 yards, 1:18.**

**Third quarter**

- DAL – Ezekiel Elliott 14-yard run (Brett Maher kick), 8:19. Eagles 20–10. **Drive: 9 plays, 79 yards, 4:28.**

**Fourth quarter**

- DAL – Jake Ferguson 7-yard pass from Cooper Rush (Brett Maher kick), 14:39. Eagles 20–17. **Drive: 15 plays, 93 yards, 7:07.**
- PHI – DeVonta Smith 7-yard pass from Jalen Hurts (run failed), 7:02. Eagles 26–17. **Drive: 13 plays, 75 yards, 7:37.**

**Top passers**

- DAL – Cooper Rush – 18/38, 181 yards, TD, 3 INT
- PHI – Jalen Hurts – 15/25, 155 yards, 2 TD

**Top rushers**

- DAL – Ezekiel Elliott – 13 rushes, 81 yards, TD
- PHI – Miles Sanders – 18 rushes, 71 yards, TD

**Top receivers**

- DAL – CeeDee Lamb – 5 receptions, 68 yards
- PHI – A. J. Brown – 5 receptions, 67 yards, TD

The Eagles continued their 2nd quarter dominance, scoring 20 points on four consecutive drives. The Cowboys offense battled back in the 2nd half scoring touchdowns on two long drives to cut the deficit to 20–17, but DeVonta Smith scored a touchdown to make it a two-score game again. Cooper Rush threw his third interception, with the following drive leading to a missed field goal attempt. The Eagles ran out the clock and won 26–17. This was the Eagles' first win against the Cowboys since 2020, their first with Hurts at starting QB and Sirianni as head coach. They also started 6–0 for the third time in franchise history.

==== Week 8: vs. Pittsburgh Steelers ====
Week 8: Pittsburgh Steelers at Philadelphia Eagles – Game summary

Quarter	1	2	3	4	Total
Steelers	7	3	3	0	**13**
**Eagles**	7	14	7	7	**35**

at Lincoln Financial Field, Philadelphia, Pennsylvania

- Date: October 30
- Game time: 1:00 p.m. EDT
- Game weather: Sunny, 61 °F (16 °C)
- Game attendance: 69,879
- Referee: Clete Blakeman
- TV announcers (CBS): Jim Nantz, Tony Romo and Tracy Wolfson
- Recap, Game Book

Game information

**First quarter**

- PHI – A. J. Brown 39-yard pass from Jalen Hurts (Jake Elliott kick), 9:23. Eagles 7–0. **Drive: 9 plays, 68 yards, 3:46.**
- PIT – Derek Watt 1-yard pass from Chase Claypool (Nick Sciba kick), 1:57. Tied 7–7. **Drive: 13 plays, 75 yards, 7:26.**

**Second quarter**

- PHI – A. J. Brown 27-yard pass from Jalen Hurts (Jake Elliott kick), 12:48. Eagles 14–7. **Drive: 11 plays, 79 yards, 4:09.**
- PHI – A. J. Brown 29-yard pass from Jalen Hurts (Jake Elliott kick), 6:13. Eagles 21–7. **Drive: 3 plays, 60 yards, 1:09.**
- PIT – Nick Sciba 38-yard field goal, 1:02. Eagles 21–10. **Drive: 12 plays, 45 yards, 5:11.**

**Third quarter**

- PHI – Zach Pascal 34-yard pass from Jalen Hurts (Jake Elliott kick), 12:53. Eagles 28–10. **Drive: 5 plays, 75 yards, 2:07.**
- PIT – Nick Sciba 29-yard field goal, 5:55. Eagles 28–13. **Drive: 15 plays, 64 yards, 6:58.**

**Fourth quarter**

- PHI – Miles Sanders 11-yard rush (Jake Elliott kick), 12:35. Eagles 35–13. **Drive: 2 plays, 54 yards, 0:55.**

**Top passers**

- PIT – Kenny Pickett – 25/38, 191 yards, INT
- PHI – Jalen Hurts – 19/28, 285 yards, 4 TD

**Top rushers**

- PIT – Jaylen Warren – 6 rushes, 50 yards
- PHI – Miles Sanders – 9 rushes, 78 yards, TD

**Top receivers**

- PIT – Pat Freiermuth – 4 receptions, 57 yards
- PHI – A. J. Brown – 6 receptions, 156 yards, 3 TD

Thanks to a 3-touchdown performance by AJ Brown and 4 passing touchdowns by Jalen Hurts, the Eagles decisively triumphed over the Steelers. With this win, the Eagles matched their franchise-best 7–0 start in 2004.

==== Week 9: at Houston Texans ====
Week 9: Philadelphia Eagles at Houston Texans – Game summary

Quarter	1	2	3	4	Total
**Eagles**	7	7	7	8	**29**
Texans	7	7	3	0	**17**

at NRG Stadium, Houston, Texas

- Date: November 3
- Game time: 8:15 p.m. EDT/7:15 p.m. CDT
- Game weather: None (retractable roof closed)
- Game attendance: 68,831
- Referee: Craig Wrolstad
- TV announcers (WPHL-TV/Prime Video): Al Michaels, Kirk Herbstreit and Kaylee Hartung
- Recap, Game Book

Game information

**First quarter**

- HOU – Teagan Quitoriano 2-yard pass from Davis Mills (Kaʻimi Fairbairn kick), 9:37. Texans 7–0. **Drive: 9 plays, 75 yards, 5:23.**
- PHI – Miles Sanders 2-yard run (Jake Elliott kick), 1:33. Tied 7–7. **Drive: 18 plays, 91 yards, 8:04.**

**Second quarter**

- PHI – Kenneth Gainwell 4-yard run (Jake Elliott kick), 4:32. Eagles 14–7. **Drive: 10 plays, 79 yards, 5:32.**
- HOU – Chris Moore 13-yard pass from Davis Mills (Kaʻimi Fairbairn kick), 0:37. Tied 14–14. **Drive: 7 plays, 75 yards, 3:55.**

**Third quarter**

- PHI – A. J. Brown 17-yard pass from Jalen Hurts (Jake Elliott kick), 8:04. Eagles 21–14. **Drive: 2 plays, 17 yards, 0:09.**
- HOU – Kaʻimi Fairbairn 30-yard field goal, 1:15. Eagles 21–17. **Drive: 12 plays, 63 yards, 6:49.**

**Fourth quarter**

- PHI – Dallas Goedert 4-yard pass from Jalen Hurts (Jalen Hurts run), 11:22. Eagles 29–17. **Drive: 10 plays, 75 yards, 4:53.**

**Top passers**

- PHI – Jalen Hurts – 21/27, 243 yards, 2 TD
- HOU – Davis Mills – 13/22, 154 yards, 2 TD, 2 INT

**Top rushers**

- PHI – Miles Sanders – 17 rushes, 93 yards, TD
- HOU – Dameon Pierce – 27 rushes, 139 yards

**Top receivers**

- PHI – Dallas Goedert – 8 receptions, 100 yards, TD
- HOU – Phillip Dorsett – 3 receptions, 69 yards

This was played the same day as Game 5 of the 2022 World Series between the Houston Astros and the Philadelphia Phillies, moved back by one day due to rain in Philadelphia earlier in the week. Estimates from Nielsen Media Research show the baseball game drew an average of five million more viewers, with a share of at least 50 in both Philadelphia and Houston. Meanwhile, the football game, originally scheduled to air on the Fox affiliates in both markets per NFL rules, moved to the MyNetworkTV affiliates in both markets.

==== Week 10: vs. Washington Commanders ====
Week 10: Washington Commanders at Philadelphia Eagles – Game summary

Quarter	1	2	3	4	Total
**Commanders**	7	13	3	9	**32**
Eagles	14	0	0	7	**21**

at Lincoln Financial Field, Philadelphia, Pennsylvania

- Date: November 14
- Game time: 8:15 p.m. EST
- Game weather: Clear, 40 °F (4 °C)
- Game attendance: 69,879
- Referee: Alex Kemp
- TV announcers (WPHL/ESPN): Joe Buck, Troy Aikman and Lisa Salters
- Recap, Game Book

Game information

**First quarter**

- PHI – Jalen Hurts 1-yard run (Jake Elliott kick), 12:21. Eagles 7–0. **Drive: 3 plays, 18 yards, 0:51.**
- WAS – Antonio Gibson 1-yard run (Joey Slye kick), 5:00. Tied 7–7. **Drive: 13 plays, 75 yards, 7:21.**
- PHI – Dallas Goedert 6-yard pass from Jalen Hurts (Jake Elliott kick), 1:30. Eagles 14–7. **Drive: 9 plays, 78 yards, 3:30.**

**Second quarter**

- WAS – Joey Slye 44-yard field goal, 10:00. Eagles 14–10. **Drive: 12 plays, 49 yards, 6:30.**
- WAS – Brian Robinson Jr. 1-yard run (Joey Slye kick), 1:39. Commanders 17–14. **Drive: 16 plays, 86 yards, 7:04.**
- WAS – Joey Slye 58-yard field goal, 0:00. Commanders 20–14. **Drive: 8 plays, 30 yards, 1:06.**

**Third quarter**

- WAS – Joey Slye 32-yard field goal, 5:13. Commanders 23–14. **Drive: 14 plays, 66 yards, 8:23.**

**Fourth quarter**

- PHI – DeVonta Smith 11-yard pass from Jalen Hurts (Jake Elliott kick), 14:54. Commanders 23–21. **Drive: 12 plays, 80 yards, 5:19.**
- WAS – Joey Slye 55-yard field goal, 7:33. Commanders 26–21. **Drive: 4 plays, 2 yards, 1:36.**
- WAS – Casey Toohill 1-yard fumble return, 0:00. Commanders 32–21.

**Top passers**

- WAS – Taylor Heinicke – 17/29, 211 yards, INT
- PHI – Jalen Hurts – 17/26, 175 yards, 2 TD, INT

**Top rushers**

- WAS – Brian Robinson Jr. – 26 rushes, 86 yards, TD
- PHI – Miles Sanders – 12 rushes, 54 yards

**Top receivers**

- WAS – Terry McLaurin – 8 receptions, 128 yards
- PHI – Quez Watkins – 4 receptions, 80 yards

The Eagles welcomed the surging Washington Commanders to Philadelphia for a rematch of their Week 3 meeting. Philadelphia started strong early, but the tables would turn in the second quarter once Washington got their run game going. The Commanders rallied behind a dominant ground attack and a lights-out defense, outscoring the Eagles 25–7 over the final three quarters to hand Philadelphia its first defeat of the season in a 32–21 upset. With the stunning loss, the Eagles fell to 8–1 and failed to become the first NFL team to start a season 9–0 since the Steelers did two seasons ago, who coincidentally also faced their first loss to Washington, who were then the Washington Football Team. Despite this loss, Philadelphia still tied a franchise record for their best start at 8–1.

==== Week 11: at Indianapolis Colts ====
Week 11: Philadelphia Eagles at Indianapolis Colts – Game summary

Quarter	1	2	3	4	Total
**Eagles**	0	3	0	14	**17**
Colts	7	3	3	3	**16**

at Lucas Oil Stadium, Indianapolis, Indiana

- Date: November 20
- Game time: 1:00 p.m. EST
- Game weather: None (retractable roof closed)
- Game attendance: 66,241
- Referee: Land Clark
- TV announcers (CBS): Ian Eagle, Charles Davis and Evan Washburn
- Recap, Game Book

Game information

**First quarter**

- IND – Jonathan Taylor 1-yard run (Chase McLaughlin kick), 9:37. Colts 7–0. **Drive: 10 plays, 75 yards, 5:23.**

**Second quarter**

- PHI – Jake Elliott 22-yard field goal, 4:50. Colts 7–3. **Drive: 15 plays, 54 yards, 7:08.**
- IND – Chase McLaughlin 51-yard field goal, 0:13. Colts 10–3. **Drive: 5 plays, 22 yards, 1:30.**

**Third quarter**

- IND – Chase McLaughlin 36-yard field goal, 13:14. Colts 13–3. **Drive: 4 plays, 5 yards, 1:35.**

**Fourth quarter**

- PHI – Quez Watkins 22-yard pass from Jalen Hurts (Jake Elliott kick), 13:31. Colts 13–10. **Drive: 5 plays, 60 yards, 2:04.**
- IND – Chase McLaughlin 37-yard field goal, 4:37. Colts 16–10. **Drive: 11 plays, 47 yards, 4:57.**
- PHI – Jalen Hurts 1-yard run (Jake Elliott kick), 1:20. Eagles 17–16. **Drive: 11 plays, 75 yards, 3:17.**

**Top passers**

- PHI – Jalen Hurts – 18/25, 190 yards, TD
- IND – Matt Ryan – 23/32, 213 yards

**Top rushers**

- PHI – Jalen Hurts – 16 rushes, 86 yards, TD
- IND – Jonathan Taylor – 22 rushes, 84 yards, TD

**Top receivers**

- PHI – DeVonta Smith – 6 receptions, 78 yards
- IND – Michael Pittman – 6 receptions, 75 yards

This was head coach Nick Sirianni's first return to Indianapolis since leaving the team in January 2021 to become the Eagles' head coach. Sirianni previously served as the Colts' offensive coordinator under then-head coach Frank Reich from 2018 to 2020, appearing in the playoffs twice in that span, and Sirianni's last game was the 2020 AFC Wild Card game, which was a 27–24 loss to the Buffalo Bills. After trailing 13–3 through three quarters, Jalen Hurts and the Eagles rallied in the fourth quarter to stun the Colts 17–16, with Hurts running the ball for the game winning score from 7 yards out with less than 90 seconds left. This victory marked the first time the Eagles won a game after trailing by 10 or more points entering the fourth quarter since 2010. The Eagles improved to 9–1, matching their win total from 2018, 2019, and 2021, and matching their best record through 10 games set in 1949, 1960, 1980, 2004, and 2017.

==== Week 12: vs. Green Bay Packers ====
Week 12: Green Bay Packers at Philadelphia Eagles – Game summary

Quarter	1	2	3	4	Total
Packers	14	6	3	10	**33**
**Eagles**	13	14	7	6	**40**

at Lincoln Financial Field, Philadelphia, Pennsylvania

- Date: November 27
- Game time: 8:20 p.m. EST
- Game weather: Cloudy, 61 °F (16 °C)
- Game attendance: 69,879
- Referee: Shawn Smith
- TV announcers (NBC): Mike Tirico, Cris Collinsworth and Melissa Stark
- Recap, Game Book

Game information

**First quarter**

- PHI – Kenneth Gainwell 4-yard run (Jake Elliott kick), 11:19. Eagles 7–0. **Drive: 10 plays, 75 yards, 3:41.**
- PHI – Miles Sanders 4-yard run (kick failed, wide right), 9:02. Eagles 13–0. **Drive: 3 plays, 29 yards, 1:21.**
- GB – A. J. Dillon 20-yard run (Mason Crosby kick), 6:40. Eagles 13–7. **Drive: 4 plays, 59 yards, 2:22.**
- GB – Randall Cobb 11-yard pass from Aaron Rodgers (Mason Crosby kick), 3:09. Packers 14–13. **Drive: 5 plays, 37 yards, 1:51.**

**Second quarter**

- PHI – Miles Sanders 2-yard run (Jake Elliott kick), 14:54. Eagles 20–14. **Drive: 7 plays, 75 yards, 3:15.**
- GB – Aaron Jones 23-yard pass from Aaron Rodgers (kick failed, wide right), 7:41. Tied 20–20. **Drive: 3 plays, 13 yards, 0:57.**
- PHI – Quez Watkins 30-yard pass from Jalen Hurts (Jake Elliott kick), 3:09. Eagles 27–20. **Drive: 9 plays, 71 yards, 2:03.**

**Third quarter**

- PHI – A. J. Brown 6-yard pass from Jalen Hurts (Jake Elliott kick), 7:19. Eagles 34–20. **Drive: 11 plays, 86 yards, 5:23.**
- GB – Mason Crosby 29-yard field goal, 2:03. Eagles 34–23. **Drive: 10 plays, 64 yards, 5:16.**

**Fourth quarter**

- PHI – Jake Elliott 31-yard field goal, 11:11. Eagles 37–23. **Drive: 14 plays, 61 yards, 5:52.**
- GB – Christian Watson 63-yard pass from Jordan Love (Mason Crosby kick), 9:00. Eagles 37–30. **Drive: 4 plays, 75 yards, 2:11.**
- PHI – Jake Elliott 54-yard field goal, 2:16. Eagles 40–30. **Drive: 10 plays, 43 yards, 6:44.**
- GB – Mason Crosby 33-yard field goal, 1:08. Eagles 40–33. **Drive: 7 plays, 38 yards, 1:08.**

**Top passers**

- GB – Aaron Rodgers – 11/16, 140 yards, 2 TD, 2 INT
- PHI – Jalen Hurts – 16/28, 153 yards, 2 TD

**Top rushers**

- GB – A. J. Dillon – 8 rushes, 64 yards, TD
- PHI – Jalen Hurts – 17 rushes, 157 yards

**Top receivers**

- GB – Christian Watson – 4 receptions, 110 yards, TD
- PHI – DeVonta Smith – 4 receptions, 50 yards

The Eagles put up 363 rushing yards against Green Bay, with both Jalen Hurts and Miles Sanders rushing for over 100 yards each. While the Eagles defense gave up 33 points to the Packers, they intercepted Aaron Rodgers twice. Rodgers exited the game in the third quarter due to an injury and was replaced by Jordan Love, who threw a 63-yard touchdown to rookie wide receiver Christian Watson. The Eagles would clinch the victory with a 54-yard field goal from Jake Elliott. With the win, the Eagles improved to 10–1 (their first double digit win season since 2017) and maintained their lead in the NFC.

==== Week 13: vs. Tennessee Titans ====
Week 13: Tennessee Titans at Philadelphia Eagles – Game summary

Quarter	1	2	3	4	Total
Titans	7	3	0	0	**10**
**Eagles**	7	14	7	7	**35**

at Lincoln Financial Field, Philadelphia, Pennsylvania

- Date: December 4
- Game time: 1:00 p.m. EST
- Game weather: Mostly sunny, 45 °F (7 °C)
- Game attendance: 69,879
- Referee: Adrian Hill
- TV announcers (Fox): Kevin Burkhardt, Greg Olsen and Erin Andrews
- Recap, Game Book

Game information

**First quarter**

- PHI – DeVonta Smith 34-yard pass from Jalen Hurts (Jake Elliott kick), 12:03. Eagles 7–0. **Drive: 7 plays, 75 yards, 2:57.**
- TEN – Treylon Burks 25-yard pass from Ryan Tannehill (Randy Bullock kick), 2:47. Tied 7–7. **Drive: 10 plays, 71 yards, 5:28.**

**Second quarter**

- PHI – A. J. Brown 40-yard pass from Jalen Hurts (Jake Elliott kick), 13:55. Eagles 14–7. **Drive: 7 plays, 85 yards, 3:52.**
- TEN – Randy Bullock 36-yard field goal, 3:28. Eagles 14–10. **Drive: 10 plays, 69 yards, 5:21.**
- PHI – Jalen Hurts 2-yard run (Jake Elliott kick), 0:51. Eagles 21–10. **Drive: 7 plays, 75 yards, 2:37.**

**Third quarter**

- PHI – A. J. Brown 29-yard pass from Jalen Hurts (Jake Elliott kick), 12:07. Eagles 28–10. **Drive: 4 plays, 50 yards, 1:22.**

**Fourth quarter**

- PHI – Miles Sanders 3-yard run (Jake Elliott kick), 11:27. Eagles 35–10. **Drive: 16 plays, 68 yards, 9:51.**

**Top passers**

- TEN – Ryan Tannehill – 14/22, 141 yards, TD
- PHI – Jalen Hurts – 29/39, 380 yards, 3 TD

**Top rushers**

- TEN – Ryan Tannehill – 3 rushes, 34 yards
- PHI – Miles Sanders – 10 rushes, 24 yards, TD

**Top receivers**

- TEN – Chig Okonkwo – 4 receptions, 68 yards
- PHI – A. J. Brown – 8 receptions, 119 yards, 2 TD

A. J. Brown dominated his former team for 119 yards and 2 touchdowns on 8 receptions. Philadelphia's defense held Titans star running back Derrick Henry to just 30 yards on the day. With the win, the Eagles improved to 11–1, their best start in 12 games since 2004.

==== Week 14: at New York Giants ====
Week 14: Philadelphia Eagles at New York Giants – Game summary

Quarter	1	2	3	4	Total
**Eagles**	7	17	10	14	**48**
Giants	0	7	7	8	**22**

at MetLife Stadium, East Rutherford, New Jersey

- Date: December 11
- Game time: 1:00 p.m. EST
- Game weather: Overcast, 37 °F (3 °C)
- Game attendance: 81,506
- Referee: Clete Blakeman
- TV announcers (Fox): Joe Davis, Daryl Johnston and Pam Oliver
- Recap, Game Book

Game information

**First quarter**

- PHI – Miles Sanders 3-yard run (Jake Elliott kick), 4:14. Eagles 7–0. **Drive: 14 plays, 84 yards, 8:05.**

**Second quarter**

- PHI – DeVonta Smith 41-yard pass from Jalen Hurts (Jake Elliott kick), 12:05. Eagles 14–0. **Drive: 12 plays, 91 yards, 4:55.**
- PHI – A. J. Brown 33-yard pass from Jalen Hurts (Jake Elliott kick), 8:16. Eagles 21–0. **Drive: 1 play, 33 yards, 0:08.**
- NYG – Isaiah Hodgins 2-yard pass from Daniel Jones (Graham Gano kick), 2:57. Eagles 21–7. **Drive: 3 plays, 15 yards, 1:18.**
- PHI – Jake Elliott 29-yard field goal, 0:54. Eagles 24–7. **Drive: 6 plays, 24 yards, 2:03.**

**Third quarter**

- PHI – Jake Elliott 39-yard field goal, 11:21. Eagles 27–7. **Drive: 8 plays, 63 yards, 3:39.**
- NYG – Daniel Jones 1-yard run (Graham Gano kick), 5:40. Eagles 27–14. **Drive: 11 plays, 75 yards, 5:41.**
- PHI – Jalen Hurts 10-yard run (Jake Elliott kick), 1:41. Eagles 34–14. **Drive: 8 plays, 63 yards, 3:59.**

**Fourth quarter**

- PHI – Miles Sanders 40-yard run (Jake Elliott kick), 6:01. Eagles 41–14. **Drive: 7 plays, 76 yards, 3:57.**
- PHI – Boston Scott 3-yard run (Jake Elliott kick), 3:09. Eagles 48–14. **Drive: 4 plays, 23 yards, 2:21.**
- NYG – Richie James 19-yard pass from Tyrod Taylor (Taylor–Hodgins pass), 0:39. Eagles 48–22. **Drive: 9 plays, 75 yards, 2:30.**

**Top passers**

- PHI – Jalen Hurts – 21/31, 217 yards, 2 TD
- NYG – Daniel Jones – 18/27, 169 yards, TD

**Top rushers**

- PHI – Miles Sanders – 17 rushes, 144 yards, 2 TD
- NYG – Tyrod Taylor – 2 rushes, 40 yards

**Top receivers**

- PHI – A. J. Brown – 4 receptions, 70 yards, TD
- NYG – Richie James – 7 receptions, 61 yards, TD

The Eagles improved to 12–1, clinching their second consecutive playoff berth, and their best start since 2004. The 48 points scored by the Eagles were their most in a game since 2017 against the Broncos. Jalen Hurts had his 10th rushing touchdown of 2022 in this game, becoming the first quarterback in NFL history to have 10 or more rushing touchdowns in back to back seasons.

==== Week 15: at Chicago Bears ====
Week 15: Philadelphia Eagles at Chicago Bears – Game summary

Quarter	1	2	3	4	Total
**Eagles**	0	10	7	8	**25**
Bears	0	6	7	7	**20**

at Soldier Field, Chicago, Illinois

- Date: December 18
- Game time: 1:00 p.m. EST/12:00 p.m. CST
- Game weather: Sunny, 18 °F (−8 °C)
- Game attendance: 48,423
- Referee: Brad Rogers
- TV announcers (Fox): Joe Davis, Daryl Johnston and Pam Oliver
- Recap, Game Book

Game information

**First quarter**

- No scoring plays.

**Second quarter**

- PHI – Jake Elliott 32-yard field goal, 11:50. Eagles 3–0. **Drive: 9 plays, 67 yards, 3:02.**
- CHI – David Montgomery 9-yard run (kick failed), 6:47. Bears 6–3. **Drive: 8 play, 75 yards, 5:03.**
- PHI – Jalen Hurts 22-yard run (Jake Elliott kick), 0:43. Eagles 10–6. **Drive: 9 plays, 91 yards, 2:06.**

**Third quarter**

- PHI – Jalen Hurts 1-yard run (Jake Elliott kick), 12:19. Eagles 17–6. **Drive: 6 plays, 42 yards, 2:41.**
- CHI – David Montgomery 10-yard pass from Justin Fields (Cairo Santos kick), 8:45. Eagles 17–13. **Drive: 3 play, 15 yards, 1:22.**

**Fourth quarter**

- PHI – Jalen Hurts 1-yard run (Jalen Hurts run), 4:20. Eagles 25–13. **Drive: 6 plays, 75 yards, 2:27.**
- CHI – Byron Pringle 35-yard pass from Justin Fields (Cairo Santos kick), 2:43. Eagles 25–20. **Drive: 6 plays, 60 yards, 1:37.**

**Top passers**

- PHI – Jalen Hurts – 22/37, 315 yards, 2 INT
- CHI – Justin Fields – 14/21, 152 yards, 2 TD

**Top rushers**

- PHI – Jalen Hurts – 17 rushes, 61 yards, 3 TD
- CHI – Justin Fields – 15 rushes, 91 yards

**Top receivers**

- PHI – A. J. Brown – 9 receptions, 181 yards
- CHI – Byron Pringle – 2 receptions, 39 yards, TD

The Eagles would go on to win their 13th game for the third time in franchise history (2017, 2004 prior) and their best start since 2004. After a shaky start with 2 interceptions, Jalen Hurts would settle in throwing for 315 yards and scoring 3 touchdowns. Those touchdowns would tie an Eagles franchise record for the most total touchdowns (35) by a quarterback in a season. A day after the game, it was revealed that Hurts had sprained his shoulder late in the third quarter. Impressively, Hurts went 6/9 for 102 yards and 104.9 rating with the sprained shoulder, including a rushing touchdown and subsequent 2-point conversion.

==== Week 16: at Dallas Cowboys ====
Week 16: Philadelphia Eagles at Dallas Cowboys – Game summary

Quarter	1	2	3	4	Total
Eagles	10	10	7	7	**34**
**Cowboys**	7	10	10	13	**40**

at AT&T Stadium, Arlington, Texas

- Date: December 24
- Game time: 4:25 p.m. EST/3:25 p.m. CST
- Game weather: None (retractable roof closed)
- Game attendance: 93,754
- Referee: Alex Kemp
- TV announcers (Fox): Kevin Burkhardt, Greg Olsen and Erin Andrews
- Recap, Game Book

Game information

**First quarter**

- PHI – Jake Elliott 25-yard field goal, 11:16. Eagles 3–0. **Drive: 7 plays, 68 yards, 3:44.**
- PHI – Josh Sweat 42-yard interception return (Jake Elliott kick), 9:18. Eagles 10–0.
- DAL – Ezekiel Elliott 1-yard run (Brett Maher kick), 1:52. Eagles 10–7. **Drive: 14 plays, 75 yards, 7:26.**

**Second quarter**

- DAL – CeeDee Lamb 36-yard pass from Dak Prescott (Brett Maher kick), 11:34. Cowboys 14–10. **Drive: 6 plays, 47 yards, 3:18.**
- PHI – Gardner Minshew 1-yard run (Jake Elliott kick), 7:08. Eagles 17–14. **Drive: 10 play, 74 yards, 4:26.**
- DAL – Brett Maher 21-yard field goal, 1:49. Tied 17–17. **Drive: 13 plays, 72 yards, 5:19.**
- PHI – Jake Elliott 47-yard field goal, 0:06. Eagles 20–17. **Drive: 10 plays, 46 yards, 1:43.**

**Third quarter**

- PHI – DeVonta Smith 14-yard pass from Gardner Minshew (Jake Elliott kick), 9:00. Eagles 27–17. **Drive: 10 plays, 77 yards, 4:37.**
- DAL – Brett Maher 44-yard field goal, 5:01. Eagles 27–20. **Drive: 9 plays, 49 yards, 3:59.**
- DAL – Michael Gallup 12-yard pass from Dak Prescott (Brett Maher kick), 2:12. Tied 27–27. **Drive: 5 plays, 31 yards, 1:59.**

**Fourth quarter**

- PHI – DeVonta Smith 9-yard pass from Gardner Minshew (Jake Elliott kick), 9:59. Eagles 34–27. **Drive: 13 plays, 75 yards, 7:13.**
- DAL – CeeDee Lamb 7-yard pass from Dak Prescott (Brett Maher kick), 5:49. Tied 34–34. **Drive: 8 plays, 75 yards, 4:10.**
- DAL – Brett Maher 48-yard field goal, 2:19. Cowboys 37–34. **Drive: 6 plays, 31 yards, 2:00.**
- DAL – Brett Maher 26-yard field goal, 1:41. Cowboys 40–34. **Drive: 5 plays, 13 yards, 0:26.**

**Top passers**

- PHI – Gardner Minshew – 24/40, 355 yards, 2 TD, 2 INT
- DAL – Dak Prescott – 27/35, 347 yards, 3 TD, INT

**Top rushers**

- PHI – Miles Sanders – 21 rushes, 65 yards
- DAL – Ezekiel Elliott – 16 rushes, 55 yards, TD

**Top receivers**

- PHI – DeVonta Smith – 8 receptions, 113 yards, 2 TD
- DAL – CeeDee Lamb – 10 receptions, 120 yards, 2 TD

Backup quarterback Gardner Minshew started the Eagles' road finale against the arch-rival Cowboys in place of Jalen Hurts, who was sitting out due to the shoulder injury he sustained the prior week against Chicago. Despite a solid performance by Minshew, Philadelphia blew two 10–point leads and was doomed by a season-high four turnovers, all of which led to scoring drives for Dallas, in what turned out to be a high-scoring slugfest. The Eagles gave up a 3rd-and-30 conversion via Dak Prescott's 52-yard pass to T.Y. Hilton, which the Cowboys would score a touchdown that same drive, which proved to be the turning point of the game. Trailing 40–34 late in the game, Minshew attempted to lead the Eagles on a go-ahead drive into Cowboys territory, but a fourth-down pass would fall incomplete, sealing Philadelphia's first and ultimately only road loss of the season. With the loss, the Eagles fell to 13–2.

==== Week 17: vs. New Orleans Saints ====
Week 17: New Orleans Saints at Philadelphia Eagles – Game summary

Quarter	1	2	3	4	Total
**Saints**	7	6	0	7	**20**
Eagles	0	0	10	0	**10**

at Lincoln Financial Field, Philadelphia, Pennsylvania

- Date: January 1
- Game time: 1:00 p.m. EST
- Game weather: Sunny, 55 °F (13 °C)
- Game attendance: 69,796
- Referee: Jerome Boger
- TV announcers (Fox): Joe Davis, Daryl Johnston and Pam Oliver
- Recap, Game Book

Game information

**First quarter**

- NO – Taysom Hill 1-yard run (Wil Lutz kick), 6:02. Saints 7–0. **Drive: 15 plays, 75 yards, 8:58.**

**Second quarter**

- NO – Wil Lutz 54-yard field goal, 8:30. Saints 10–0. **Drive: 5 plays, 22 yards, 2:58.**
- NO – Wil Lutz 20-yard field goal, 3:05. Saints 13–0. **Drive: 7 plays, 68 yards, 3:55.**

**Third quarter**

- PHI – Jake Elliott 56-yard field goal, 10:58. Saints 13–3. **Drive: 9 plays, 53 yards, 4:02.**
- PHI – A. J. Brown 78-yard pass from Gardner Minshew (Jake Elliott kick), 0:45. Saints 13–10. **Drive: 3 plays, 96 yards, 1:29.**

**Fourth quarter**

- NO – Marshon Lattimore 12-yard interception return (Wil Lutz kick), 5:27. Saints 20–10.

**Top passers**

- NO – Andy Dalton – 18/22, 204 yards, INT
- PHI – Gardner Minshew – 18/32, 274 yards, TD, INT

**Top rushers**

- NO – Alvin Kamara – 16 rushes, 74 yards
- PHI – Miles Sanders – 12 rushes, 61 yards

**Top receivers**

- NO – Rashid Shaheed – 6 receptions, 79 yards
- PHI – DeVonta Smith – 9 receptions, 115 yards

The Eagles returned home, seeking to clinch the NFC East for the first time since 2019 and the number 1 seed for the first time since 2017. However, they were instead dealt their second straight defeat in a defensive slugfest with a red-hot New Orleans Saints team. After falling behind 13–0 at halftime, Philadelphia pulled within three points of New Orleans with a ten-point third quarter, but their momentum would be halted with a Marshon Lattimore pick-six in the fourth quarter. With the 20–10 upset loss, the Eagles dropped to 13–3 on the year, and now needed either a Week 18 win against the New York Giants or a Dallas Cowboys loss to clinch the division, and a win or losses by both Dallas and San Francisco to clinch the No. 1 seed. It was the first since the 2018 season that Philadelphia was defeated by New Orleans.

==== Week 18: vs. New York Giants ====
Week 18: New York Giants at Philadelphia Eagles – Game summary

Quarter	1	2	3	4	Total
Giants	0	0	3	13	**16**
**Eagles**	10	6	3	3	**22**

at Lincoln Financial Field, Philadelphia, Pennsylvania

- Date: January 8
- Game time: 4:25 p.m. EST
- Game weather: Partly cloudy, 42 °F (6 °C)
- Game attendance: 69,879
- Referee: Carl Cheffers
- TV announcers (CBS): Ian Eagle, Charles Davis and Evan Washburn
- Recap, Game Book

Game information

**First quarter**

- PHI – Jake Elliott 32-yard field goal, 11:39. Eagles 3–0. **Drive: 7 plays, 51 yards, 1:48.**
- PHI – Boston Scott 8-yard run (Jake Elliott kick), 4:14. Eagles 10–0. **Drive: 12 plays, 80 yards, 6:27.**

**Second quarter**

- PHI – Jake Elliott 52-yard field goal, 10:22. Eagles 13–0. **Drive: 4 plays, 5 yards, 1:31.**
- PHI – Jake Elliott 39-yard field goal, 0:45. Eagles 16–0. **Drive: 14 plays, 59 yards, 5:15.**

**Third quarter**

- PHI – Jake Elliott 54-yard field goal, 6:17. Eagles 19–0. **Drive: 7 plays, 36 yards, 2:41.**
- NYG – Graham Gano 24-yard field goal, 0:50. Eagles 19–3. **Drive: 9 plays, 69 yards, 5:27.**

**Fourth quarter**

- NYG – Davis Webb 14-yard run (pass failed), 10:04. Eagles 19–9. **Drive: 10 plays, 59 yards, 4:46.**
- PHI – Jake Elliott 22-yard field goal, 3:21. Eagles 22–9. **Drive: 15 plays, 71 yards, 6:43.**
- NYG – Kenny Golladay 25-yard pass from Davis Webb (Graham Gano kick), 1:38. Eagles 22–16. **Drive: 7 plays, 54 yards, 1:43.**

**Top passers**

- NYG – Davis Webb – 23/40, 168 yards, TD
- PHI – Jalen Hurts – 20/35, 229 yards, INT

**Top rushers**

- NYG – Gary Brightwell – 11 rushes, 60 yards
- PHI – Boston Scott – 9 rushes, 54 yards, TD

**Top receivers**

- NYG – Lawrence Cager – 8 receptions, 69 yards
- PHI – A. J. Brown – 4 receptions, 95 yards

Jalen Hurts returned to the Eagles' lineup against the New York Giants after missing the previous two games to a shoulder injury. Philadelphia would secure the NFC East division and the NFC's top seed behind five field goals by Jake Elliott and a rushing touchdown by Boston Scott. With the 22–16 victory, their ninth straight at home against the Giants, the Eagles finished the regular season with a 14–3 record, and set a franchise high for most regular season wins in a season.

=== Standings ===
==== Division ====
NFC East
	W	L	T	PCT	DIV	CONF	PF	PA	STK
^{(1)} Philadelphia Eagles	14	3	0	.824	4–2	9–3	477	344	W1
^{(5)} Dallas Cowboys	12	5	0	.706	4–2	8–4	467	342	L1
^{(6)} New York Giants	9	7	1	.559	1–4–1	4–7–1	365	371	L1
Washington Commanders	8	8	1	.500	2–3–1	5–6–1	321	343	W1

==== Conference ====
NFC
#	Team	Division	W	L	T	PCT	DIV	CONF	SOS	SOV	STK
**Division leaders**
1	Philadelphia Eagles	East	14	3	0	.824	4–2	9–3	.474	.460	W1
2 (Note: San Francisco claimed the No. 2 seed over Minnesota based on conference record (10–2 vs. 8–4).)	San Francisco 49ers	West	13	4	0	.765	6–0	10–2	.417	.414	W10
3	Minnesota Vikings	North	13	4	0	.765	4–2	8–4	.474	.425	W1
4	Tampa Bay Buccaneers	South	8	9	0	.471	4–2	8–4	.503	.426	L1
**Wild cards**
5	Dallas Cowboys	East	12	5	0	.706	4–2	8–4	.507	.485	L1
6	New York Giants	East	9	7	1	.559	1–4–1	4–7–1	.526	.395	L1
7 (Note: Seattle finished ahead of Detroit based on head-to-head victory, claiming the 7th and final playoff spot.)	Seattle Seahawks	West	9	8	0	.529	4–2	6–6	.462	.382	W2
**Did not qualify for the postseason**
8	Detroit Lions	North	9	8	0	.529	5–1	7–5	.535	.451	W2
9	Washington Commanders	East	8	8	1	.500	2–3–1	5–6–1	.536	.449	W1
10	Green Bay Packers	North	8	9	0	.471	3–3	6–6	.524	.449	L1
11 (Note: Carolina finished ahead of New Orleans and Atlanta based on head-to-head record (3–1 vs. 2–2/1–3).)	Carolina Panthers	South	7	10	0	.412	4–2	6–6	.474	.437	W1
12 (Note: New Orleans finished ahead of Atlanta based on head-to-head sweep.)	New Orleans Saints	South	7	10	0	.412	2–4	5–7	.507	.462	L1
13	Atlanta Falcons	South	7	10	0	.412	2–4	6–6	.467	.429	W2
14	Los Angeles Rams	West	5	12	0	.294	1–5	3–9	.517	.341	L2
15	Arizona Cardinals	West	4	13	0	.235	1–5	3–9	.529	.368	L7
16	Chicago Bears	North	3	14	0	.176	0–6	1–11	.571	.480	L10
**Tiebreakers** (Note: When breaking ties for three or more teams under the NFL's rules, they are first broken within divisions, then comparing only the highest-ranked remaining team from each division.)

== Postseason ==
=== Schedule ===
Round	Date	Opponent (seed)	Result	Record	Venue	Recap
Wild Card	First-round bye					
Divisional	January 21	New York Giants (6)	W 38–7	1–0	Lincoln Financial Field	Recap
NFC Championship	January 29	San Francisco 49ers (2)	W 31–7	2–0	Lincoln Financial Field	Recap
Super Bowl LVII	February 12	vs. Kansas City Chiefs (A1)	L 35–38	2–1	State Farm Stadium	Recap

=== Game summaries ===
==== NFC Divisional Playoffs: vs. (6) New York Giants ====
NFC Divisional Playoffs: (6) New York Giants at (1) Philadelphia Eagles – Game summary

Quarter	1	2	3	4	Total
Giants	0	0	7	0	7
Eagles	14	14	0	10	38

at Lincoln Financial Field, Philadelphia, Pennsylvania

- Date: January 21, 2023
- Game time: 8:15 p.m. EST
- Game weather: Cloudy, 38 °F (3 °C)
- Game attendance: 69,879
- Referee: Clete Blakeman
- TV announcers (Fox): Joe Davis, Daryl Johnston, Pam Oliver, and Kristina Pink
- Recap, Game Book

Game information

First quarter

- PHI – Dallas Goedert 16-yard pass from Jalen Hurts (Jake Elliott kick), 10:06. Eagles 7–0. Drive: 8 plays, 75 yards, 4:54.
- PHI – DeVonta Smith 9-yard pass from Jalen Hurts (Jake Elliott kick), 1:21. Eagles 14–0. Drive: 8 plays, 52 yards, 4:18.

Second quarter

- PHI – Boston Scott 3-yard rush (Jake Elliott kick), 7:29. Eagles 21–0. Drive: 9 plays, 63 yards, 4:52.
- PHI – Jalen Hurts 4-yard rush (Jake Elliott kick), 0:43. Eagles 28–0. Drive: 14 plays, 72 yards, 5:04.

Third quarter

- NYG – Matt Breida 8-yard rush (Graham Gano kick), 6:15. Eagles 28–7. Drive: 10 plays, 88 yards, 6:01.

Fourth quarter

- PHI – Jake Elliott 30-yard field goal, 5:16. Eagles 31–7. Drive: 15 plays, 70 yards, 7:56.
- PHI – Kenneth Gainwell 35-yard rush (Jake Elliott kick), 1:51. Eagles 38–7. Drive: 3 plays, 36 yards, 1:00.

Top passers

- NYG – Daniel Jones – 15/27, 135 yards, INT
- PHI – Jalen Hurts – 16/24, 154 yards, 2 TD

Top rushers

- NYG – Saquon Barkley – 9 rushes, 61 yards
- PHI – Kenneth Gainwell – 12 rushes, 112 yards, TD

Top receivers

- NYG – Richie James – 7 receptions, 51 yards
- PHI – DeVonta Smith – 6 receptions, 61 yards, 1 TD

The Eagles convincingly routed their division rival New York Giants 38–7 in their first home playoff victory since the 2017 Super Bowl championship season. New York had won their Wild Card playoff matchup on the road against the Minnesota Vikings, with Daniel Jones turning in arguably his strongest performance as a professional. The Eagles, meanwhile, had lumbered down the stretch, dropping two of their last three games and needing to play starters in Week 18 to finally secure the top seed.

Jalen Hurts connected with DeVonta Smith for 40 yards on the second play from scrimmage. Dallas Goedert brought in a pass one-handed for a touchdown to finish the drive. Consecutive sacks by Haason Reddick turned the ball back over to the Eagles, who went up 14–0 on a 9-yard touchdown reception by Smith. Former Giant James Bradberry intercepted Jones on New York's ensuing possession. In the second quarter, Boston Scott scored on a 3-yard touchdown run, and Hurts capped off a 14-play drive with a 5-yard touchdown run to push the score to 28–0. A third quarter touchdown run by Matt Breida got New York on the board, set up by a 39-yard Saquon Barkley rush. A 15-play, 8-minute drive resulted in a Jake Elliott field goal and essentially ended any hope of a New York comeback. A 35-yard rushing touchdown by Kenneth Gainwell closed the scoring at 38–7 Eagles.

The Eagles offense produced 268 rushing yards on 44 carries, with Gainwell leading the way at 112 yards, while the defense contributed five sacks. With the victory, the Eagles advanced to the NFC Championship, their first in five seasons.

==== NFC Championship: vs. (2) San Francisco 49ers ====
NFC Championship: (2) San Francisco 49ers at (1) Philadelphia Eagles – Game summary

Quarter	1	2	3	4	Total
49ers	0	7	0	0	7
Eagles	7	14	7	3	31

at Lincoln Financial Field, Philadelphia, Pennsylvania

- Date: January 29, 2023
- Game time: 3:05 p.m. EST
- Game weather: Rain, 51 °F (11 °C)
- Game attendance: 69,879
- Referee: John Hussey
- TV announcers (Fox): Kevin Burkhardt, Greg Olsen, Erin Andrews, and Tom Rinaldi
- Recap, Game Book

Game information

First quarter

- PHI – Miles Sanders 6-yard rush (Jake Elliott kick), 9:48. Eagles 7–0. Drive: 11 plays, 66 yards, 5:12.

Second quarter

- SF – Christian McCaffrey 23-yard rush (Robbie Gould kick), 8:29. Tied 7–7. Drive: 6 plays, 46 yards, 2:46.
- PHI – Miles Sanders 13-yard rush (Jake Elliott kick), 1:36. Eagles 14–7. Drive: 14 plays, 75 yards, 6:53.
- PHI – Boston Scott 10-yard rush (Jake Elliott kick), 0:16. Eagles 21–7. Drive: 3 plays, 30 yards, 0:55.

Third quarter

- PHI – Jalen Hurts 1-yard rush (Jake Elliott kick), 0:43. Eagles 28–7. Drive: 15 plays, 91 yards, 7:50.

Fourth quarter

- PHI – Jake Elliott 31-yard field goal, 5:17. Eagles 31–7. Drive: 9 plays, 30 yards, 5:35.

Top passers

- SF – Josh Johnson – 7/13, 74 yards
- PHI – Jalen Hurts – 15/25, 121 yards

Top rushers

- SF – Christian McCaffrey – 15 rushes, 84 yards, TD
- PHI – Kenneth Gainwell – 14 rushes, 48 yards

Top receivers

- SF – Deebo Samuel – 3 receptions, 33 yards
- PHI – DeVonta Smith – 2 receptions, 36 yards

The Eagles routed the San Francisco 49ers 31–7 in the NFC Championship Game. While this was Philadelphia's first appearance in the conference championship since the 2017 season, it was San Francisco's third trip in four years. The 49ers had rolled to a 13–4 record and second seed during the season, mostly behind the league's top-ranked defense, but also due to the surprising play of rookie (7th round draft pick) quarterback Brock Purdy.

On the opening drive of the game, DeVonta Smith made a diving, one-armed reception on a fourth down play to set up first-and-goal for the Eagles. Replays showed the ball had hit the ground, but the 49ers failed to challenge the play in time. Miles Sanders took a handoff six yards up the middle for a touchdown to make it 7–0 Philadelphia. On San Francisco's first possession, Purdy was sacked while in his throwing motion by Haason Reddick. The hit resulted in a fumble recovered by Eagles nose tackle Linval Joseph, and more consequentially, injured Purdy's throwing elbow. Journeyman backup Josh Johnson replaced Purdy, and strong defensive play by each team dominated the rest of the first quarter and into the second quarter. An impressive 29-yard touchdown run, in which he broke four tackles, by Christian McCaffrey tied the game for San Francisco. The Eagles answered immediately with a methodical touchdown drive capped off by a 13-yard scamper into the end zone by Sanders. With 1:19 left in the half, Johnson lost a fumble on a shotgun, and Boston Scott rushed to the right side for a 10-yard touchdown to make it 21–7 Eagles at halftime.

On the first series of the third quarter, Johnson was knocked out of the game on a hit by Ndamukong Suh, forcing an injured Purdy back into action. With Purdy unable throw more than about ten yards, the 49ers offense was powerless to mount a credible comeback attempt. Jalen Hurts added a 1-yard rushing touchdown after a 15-play drive late in the third quarter, and Jake Elliott's fourth quarter field goal made it 31–7 Eagles. With less than 5 minutes left to play, 49ers All-Pro left tackle Trent Williams slammed Eagles backup safety K'Von Wallace to the ground, causing a brawl between both teams.

The 49ers were able to limit Hurts to just 121 passing yards; however, the Eagles ground attack was able to move the ball against the stout San Francisco rushing defense, totaling 148 yards for the day with all four touchdowns coming on the ground. The Eagles defense tallied three sacks and forced three turnovers (all fumbles). With the win, Philadelphia reached the Super Bowl for the first time since Super Bowl LII. The win would also mark the franchise's fourth overall NFC Championship and their third since 2004, all of which were won at Lincoln Financial Field.

==== Super Bowl LVII: vs. (A1) Kansas City Chiefs ====
Super Bowl LVII: (A1) Kansas City Chiefs vs. (N1) Philadelphia Eagles – Game summary

Quarter	1	2	3	4	Total
Chiefs	7	7	7	17	38
Eagles	7	17	3	8	35

at State Farm Stadium, Glendale, Arizona

- Date: February 12, 2023
- Game time: 6:30 p.m. EST/4:30 p.m. MST
- Game weather: Sunny, 77 °F (25 °C) (retractable roof open)
- Game attendance: 67,827
- Referee: Carl Cheffers
- TV announcers (Fox): Kevin Burkhardt, Greg Olsen, Erin Andrews, and Tom Rinaldi
- Recap, Game Book

Game information

First quarter

- PHI – Jalen Hurts 1-yard run (Jake Elliott kick), 10:09. Eagles 7–0. Drive: 11 plays, 75 yards, 4:51.
- KC – Travis Kelce 18-yard pass from Patrick Mahomes (Harrison Butker kick), 6:57. Tied 7–7. Drive: 6 plays, 75 yards, 3:12.

Second quarter

- PHI – A. J. Brown 45-yard pass from Jalen Hurts (Jake Elliott kick), 14:52. Eagles 14–7. Drive: 5 plays, 68 yards, 2:32.
- KC – Nick Bolton 36-yard fumble return (Harrison Butker kick), 9:39. Tied 14–14.
- PHI – Jalen Hurts 4-yard run (Jake Elliott kick), 2:20. Eagles 21–14. Drive: 12 plays, 75 yards, 7:19.
- PHI – Jake Elliott 35-yard field goal, 0:00. Eagles 24–14. Drive: 8 plays, 40 yards, 1:22.

Third quarter

- KC – Isiah Pacheco 1-yard run (Harrison Butker kick), 9:30. Eagles 24–21. Drive: 10 plays, 75 yards, 5:30.
- PHI – Jake Elliott 33-yard field goal, 1:45. Eagles 27–21. Drive: 17 plays, 60 yards, 7:45.

Fourth quarter

- KC – Kadarius Toney 5-yard pass from Patrick Mahomes (Harrison Butker kick), 12:04. Chiefs 28–27. Drive: 9 plays, 75 yards, 4:41.
- KC – Skyy Moore 4-yard pass from Patrick Mahomes (Harrison Butker kick), 9:22. Chiefs 35–27. Drive: 3 plays, 5 yards, 0:49.
- PHI – Jalen Hurts 2-yard run (Jalen Hurts run), 5:15. Tied 35–35. Drive: 8 plays, 75 yards, 4:07.
- KC – Harrison Butker 27-yard field goal, 0:08. Chiefs 38–35. Drive: 12 plays, 66 yards, 5:07.

Top passers

- KC – Patrick Mahomes – 21/27, 182 yards, 3 TD
- PHI – Jalen Hurts – 27/38, 304 yards, TD

Top rushers

- KC – Isiah Pacheco – 15 rushes, 76 yards, TD
- PHI – Jalen Hurts – 15 rushes, 70 yards, 3 TD

Top receivers

- KC – Travis Kelce – 6 receptions, 81 yards, TD
- PHI – DeVonta Smith – 7 receptions, 100 yards

The Eagles fell 38–35 to the Kansas City Chiefs in the franchise's fourth ever Super Bowl appearance. Pre-game storylines centered on Eagles center Jason Kelce and Chiefs tight end Travis Kelce becoming the first brothers to meet in the Super Bowl. Additionally, Chiefs head coach Andy Reid was facing his former team, where he spent 14 seasons as head coach (1999-2012). Finally, the game featured two of the league's best quarterbacks in Jalen Hurts and Patrick Mahomes in the first-ever Super Bowl matchup of two black quarterbacks.

Hurts opened the scoring with a quarterback sneak into the end zone on the first series. Mahomes needed six plays to match, tying the game on a touchdown pass to Kelce. On the first play of the second quarter, Hurts connected on a 45-yard bomb to receiver A. J. Brown in the end zone to make it 14–7 Eagles. On Philadelphia's next possession, Hurts drove to midfield, but lost the football in the backfield on a third down play. Chiefs linebacker Nick Bolton recovered the fumble and returned it for a game-tying touchdown. Hurts responded to the costly miscue with a 75-yard drive ending in him rushing the ball in himself for a 4-yard score. On Kansas City's next possession, Mahomes appeared to aggravate an ankle injury he had suffered earlier in the playoffs after a tackle by linebacker T. J. Edwards. A 22-yard reception by A.J. Brown helped set up a 35-yard Jake Elliott field goal, sending the teams to halftime with the score 24–14 Philadelphia.

The Chiefs offense would play a nearly flawless second half, however. Their opening drive of the third quarter culminated in an Isiah Pacheco 1-yard touchdown run, narrowing the score to 27–24. Hurts countered with a 17-play drive that included two impressive third down conversions to tight end Dallas Goedert, but the drive ended in a field goal, allowing Kansas City to take its first lead when Mahomes hit Kadarius Toney for a 5-yard touchdown on the Chiefs' next possession. The Eagles then went three-and-out, and the resultant Arryn Siposs punt was kicked away from the planned coverage, enabling a 65-yard return by Toney to the Philadelphia 5-yard line. Mahomes, on a broken play, completed a touchdown pass to Skyy Moore, opening up a 35–27 Chiefs lead. With just over nine minutes remaining in regulation, Hurts drove the Eagles to midfield then connected on a 45-yard pass down the left sideline to DeVonta Smith. Hurts scored on a quarterback sneak on the next play, then broke a tackle on the two-point conversion attempt to tie the game at 35–35. Philadelphia's defense remained unable to stop the Chiefs, however, and Mahomes drove into the red zone. A controversial holding penalty on Eagles corner James Bradberry allowed the Chiefs to run down most of the remaining time before kicking the game-deciding field goal from 27 yards out.

Hurts starred for the Eagles in defeat, passing for 304 yards and a touchdown, while also rushing for 70 yards and three touchdowns. The Philadelphia defense, which recorded 70 sacks during the regular season and 8 in the playoffs, was unable to get to Mahomes. The defeat dropped the Eagles to 1–3 all-time in Super Bowls.

== Awards and honors ==
Recipient	Award(s)
Zech McPhearson	Week 1: NFC Special Teams Player of the Week
Darius Slay	Week 2: NFC Defensive Player of the Week
Brandon Graham	Week 3: NFC Defensive Player of the Week
Haason Reddick	Week 4: NFC Defensive Player of the Week
Jalen Hurts	September: NFC Offensive Player of the Month
Cameron Dicker	Week 5: NFC Special Teams Player of the Week
Jalen Hurts	Week 12: NFC Offensive Player of the Week
Jalen Hurts	Week 13: NFC Offensive Player of the Week
Brandon Graham	Week 14: NFC Defensive Player of the Week
Jake Elliott	Week 18: NFC Special Teams Player of the Week
Haason Reddick	December/January: NFC Defensive Player of the Month
