= Jameson Fisher =

American baseball player (born 1993)

- Outfielder
- Born: December 18, 1993 (age 32); Baton Rouge, Louisiana, U.S.
- Bats: Left Throws: Right
- Stats at Baseball Reference

Jameson Fisher (born February 6, 1995) is an American former professional baseball outfielder.

== Amateur career ==
Fisher attended Zachary High School in Zachary, Louisiana. He was drafted by the Chicago Cubs in the 24th round of the 2012 Major League Baseball draft, but declined to sign a minor league contract and instead attended Southeastern Louisiana University where he played college baseball.

He began college baseball playing catcher and first baseman. After tearing the labrum in his right shoulder, he underwent surgery and missed the 2015 season. In the following season as a senior, Fisher led the NCAA in hitting with a .424 batting average, 11 home runs, and 66 RBIs. He also scored 49 runs and stole 15 bases. Over his college career, Fisher had a batting average of .375 with 14 homers and 132 RBIs, stealing 32 stolen bases. In 2014, he played collegiate summer baseball with the Cotuit Kettleers of the Cape Cod Baseball League.

== Professional career ==
Fisher was drafted in the fourth round with the 116th overall pick in the 2016 MLB draft by the Chicago White Sox. Fisher spent the 2016 season in rookie-level baseball with the Great Falls Voyagers of the Pioneer League, finishing with a .342 batting average, four home runs and 25 RBIs over 187 at-bats. He was promoted to the Kannapolis Intimidators of the Single–A South Atlantic League to start the 2017 season. There he played 60 games before being promoted to the Winston-Salem Dash of the High-A Carolina League, where he finished the 2017 season. During the year, he posted a combined .245 batting average with a .342 on-base percentage and a .402 slugging percentage.

In 2018, Fisher spent the year with the Double–A Birmingham Barons, playing in 97 games and hitting .216/.321/.321 with 6 home runs and 24 RBI. He returned to Winston-Salem in 2019, appearing in a career–high 127 games and batting .242/.343/.375 with 9 home runs, 44 RBI, and 7 stolen bases. Fisher did not play in a game in 2020 due to the cancellation of the minor league season because of the COVID-19 pandemic.

Fisher returned to action in 2021 with Double–A Birmingham. In 88 games for the Barons, he batted .287/.359/.463 with a career–high 12 home runs and 47 RBI. In 2022, he played in 14 games for the Triple–A Charlotte Knights, struggling to a .149/.245/.192 batting line with no home runs and 5 RBI. On May 19, 2022, Fisher was released by the White Sox organization.

In September 2022, Fisher retired from professional baseball and joined Marucci as a lead lab technician and master bat fitter.
