= Zach Von Rosenberg =

American football and baseball player (born 1990)

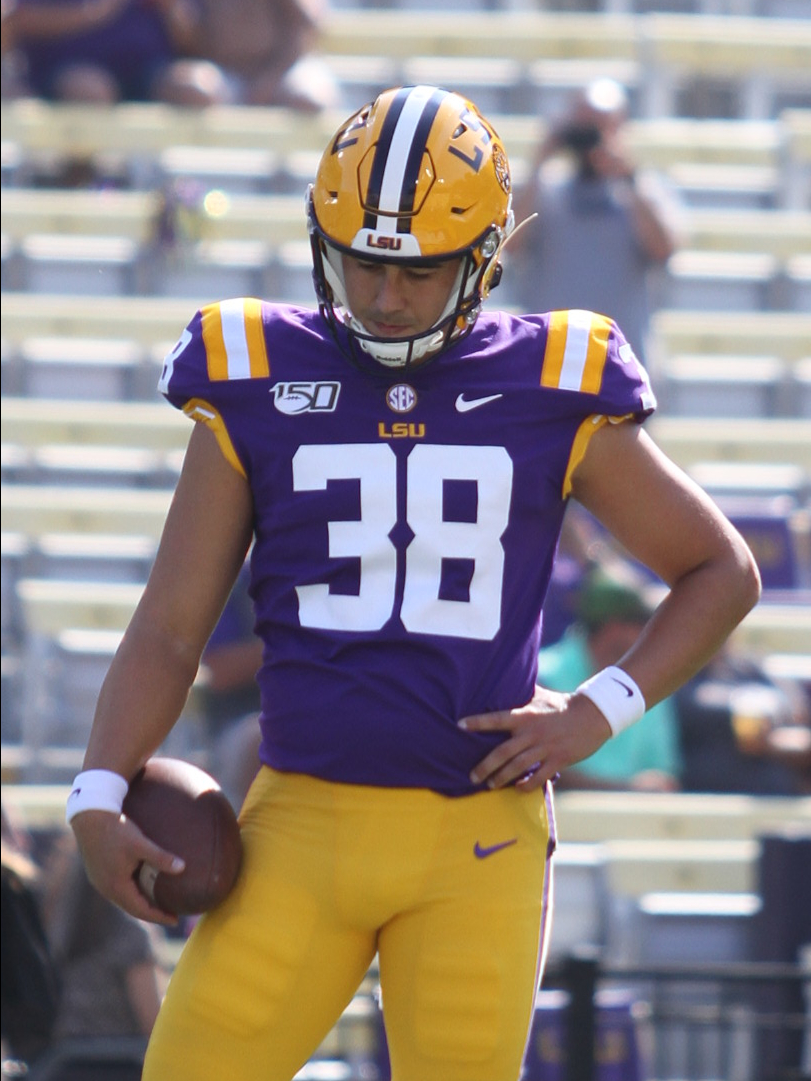
- Von Rosenberg with LSU in 2019

Profile
- Position: Punter

Personal information
- Born: September 24, 1990 (age 36); Lake Charles, Louisiana, U.S.
- Listed height: 6 ft 5 in (1.96 m)
- Listed weight: 245 lb (111 kg)

Career information
- High school: Zachary (LA)
- College: LSU (2016–2020)
- NFL draft: 2021: undrafted

Career history
- Minnesota Vikings (2021)*
- * Offseason or practice squad member only

Awards and highlights
- CFP national champion (2019); 2× Second-team All-SEC (2018, 2020)

Zach Von Rosenberg (born September 24, 1990) is an American former football punter and baseball pitcher. He played college football for the LSU Tigers and was previously a pitcher in the Pittsburgh Pirates organization.

== Early life ==
Von Rosenberg was born and originally grew up in Lake Charles, Louisiana. He initially attended Alfred M. Barbe High School, where he was a starting pitcher on the baseball team as a freshman when the Bucs won the 5A State Championship. Von Rosenberg and his family moved to Zachary, Louisiana after being displaced by Hurricane Rita and he enrolled at Zachary High School, where he played football and baseball. Von Rosenberg won three more state championships at Zachary and compiled 42–6 record with a 0.79 ERA over the course of his high school career and was named Louisiana's Mr. Baseball as a junior and as a senior.

== Baseball career ==
Von Rosenberg was selected by the Pittsburgh Pirates in the sixth round of the 2009 Major League Baseball draft. He had initially intended to play college baseball at LSU, but ultimately signed with the Pirates after receiving a $1.2 million signing bonus. He made his professional debut with the GCL Pirates. In 2010, Von Rosenberg played for the Low-A State College Spikes, pitching to a 1–6 record and 3.20 ERA in 13 appearances. The next year, he played for the Single-A West Virginia Power, recording a 5–9 record and 5.73 ERA with 114 strikeouts in 125.2 innings pitched. He returned to West Virginia for the 2012 season, logging a 5–7 record and 4.36 ERA in 17 appearances. In 2013, Von Rosenberg played for the High-A Bradenton Marauders, posting a 2–1 record and 3.91 ERA in 14 games with the team. He spent the 2014 season with West Virginia, pitching to a 2–2 record and 3.38 ERA with 25 strikeouts in 37.1 innings across 16 games. On March 26, 2015, Von Rosenberg was released by the Pirates organization. Von Rosenberg retired from professional baseball after playing in six minor league seasons and suffering several injuries.

== Football career ==
=== College career ===
Von Rosenberg joined the LSU Tigers football team as a walk-on and redshirted his true freshman season. He initially was tried out as a quarterback and tight end before LSU's coaches had him practice as a punter. Von Rosenberg became the team's primary punter early in his redshirt freshman season and was named to the Southeastern Conference (SEC) All-Freshman team after punting 36 times for an average of 43.3 yards. He was named second-team All-SEC the following season after finishing second in the conference with 45.7 yard per punt on 51 attempts. As a redshirt junior, Von Rosenberg punted 47 times with a 42.8 yard average as the Tigers won the 2020 National Championship. As a redshirt senior, he was named second-team All-SEC after averaging 43.9 yards on 59 punts.

=== Professional career ===
On May 4, 2021, Von Rosenberg signed with the Minnesota Vikings as an undrafted free agent following the 2021 NFL draft. He was waived by the Vikings on June 15.
