= Boston Scott =

American football player (born 1995)

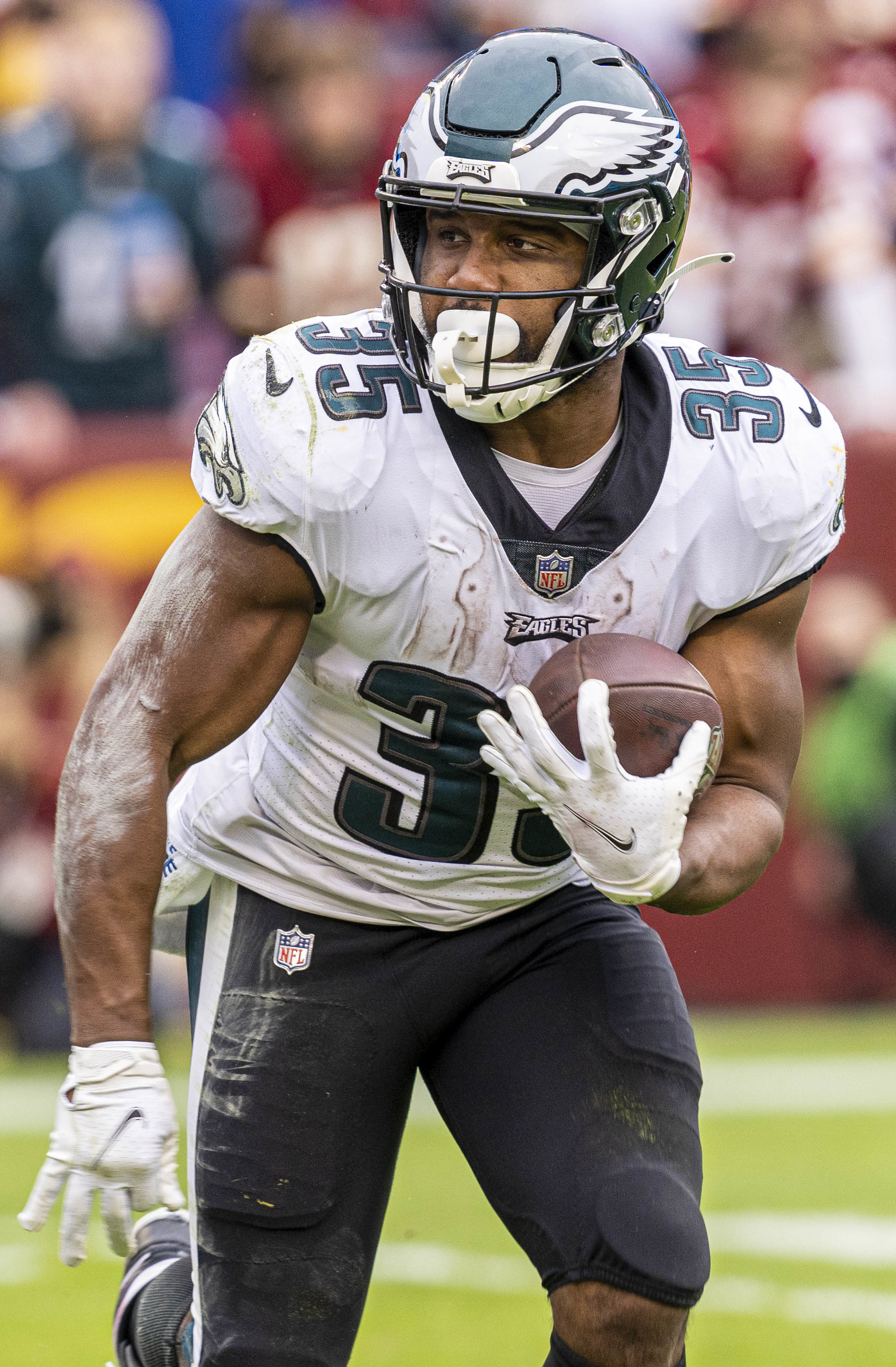
- Scott with the Philadelphia Eagles in 2022

No. 49, 35, 33
- Position: Running back

Personal information
- Born: April 27, 1995 (age 31); Baton Rouge, Louisiana, U.S.
- Listed height: 5 ft 6 in (1.68 m)
- Listed weight: 203 lb (92 kg)

Career information
- High school: Zachary (Zachary, Louisiana)
- College: Louisiana Tech (2013–2017)
- NFL draft: 2018: 6th round, 201st overall pick

Career history
- New Orleans Saints (2018)*; Philadelphia Eagles (2018–2023); Los Angeles Rams (2024)*; Pittsburgh Steelers (2024)*
- * Offseason or practice squad member only

Awards and highlights
- Third-team All-Conference USA (2017)

Career NFL statistics
- Rushing yards: 1,295
- Rushing average: 4.3
- Receptions: 71
- Receiving yards: 566
- Return yards: 1,547
- Total touchdowns: 17
- Stats at Pro Football Reference

Boston Nealand Scott (born April 27, 1995) is an American former professional football running back and professional Rocket League esports player and streamer for Dignitas. He played college football at Louisiana Tech. He was selected by the New Orleans Saints in the sixth round of the 2018 NFL draft. Scott also played for the Philadelphia Eagles and was known among fans as "the Giant Killer" due to his propensity to perform well against the New York Giants.

== Early life ==
Scott attended Zachary High School where he was the leading rusher and earned local and state honors. He was a high school state champion in weightlifting.

== College career ==
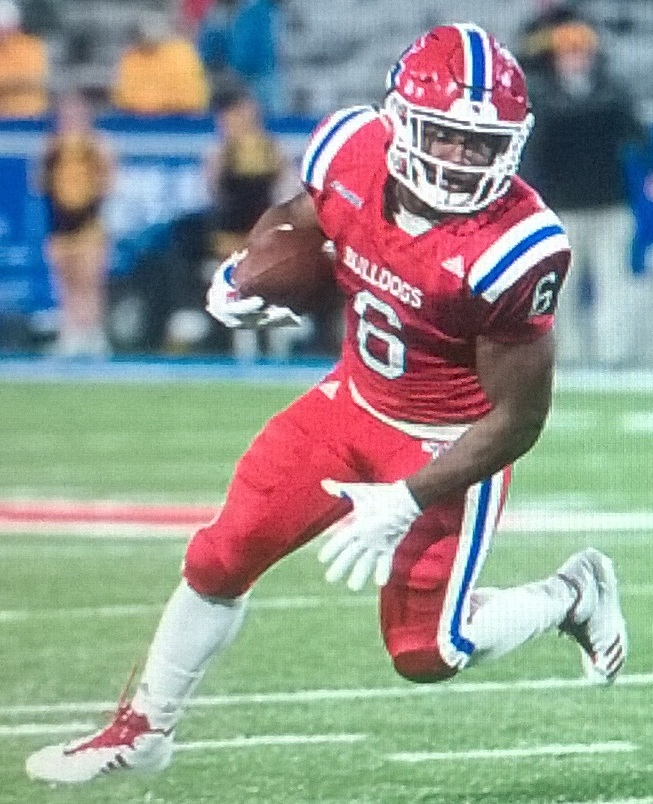
Scott in 2017

Scott played four seasons for Louisiana Tech. In his senior season at Louisiana Tech, he rushed for 937 yards on 163 attempts, resulting in a regular season average of 5.7 yards per attempt. In 2017, he had 1,301 yards of overall offense, contributing 108.4 yards per game. Scott was a watchlist candidate for the Wuerffel Trophy.

=== College statistics ===
Season	Team	Conf	GP	Rushing				Receiving				Kickoff Return			
Season	Team	Conf	GP	Att	Yds	Avg	TD	Rec	Yds	Avg	TD	Ret	Yds	Avg	TD
2014	Louisiana Tech	C-USA	1	1	3	3.0	0	0	0	0.0	0	0	0	0.0	0
2015	Louisiana Tech	C-USA	9	34	275	8.1	0	1	1	1.0	0	9	251	27.9	0
2016	Louisiana Tech	C-USA	14	70	515	7.4	6	11	125	11.4	0	10	199	19.9	0
2017	Louisiana Tech	C-USA	13	183	1,047	5.7	8	20	181	9.1	1	10	183	18.3	0
Career			37	288	1,840	6.4	14	32	307	9.6	1	29	633	21.8	0

== Professional career ==
Pre-draft measurables
Height	Weight	Arm length	Hand span	Wingspan	40-yard dash	10-yard split	20-yard split	20-yard shuttle	Three-cone drill	Vertical jump	Broad jump	Bench press
5 ft 6 3/4 in (1.70 m)	195 lb (88 kg)	29 7/8 in (0.76 m)	9 3/8 in (0.24 m)	6 ft 0 5/8 in (1.84 m)	4.41 s	1.58 s	2.71 s	4.15 s	6.67 s	38.5 in (0.98 m)	10 ft 1 in (3.07 m)	21 reps
All values from Pro Day

=== New Orleans Saints ===
Scott was selected by the New Orleans Saints in the sixth round (201st overall) of the 2018 NFL draft. On May 10, 2018, Scott signed his rookie contract with the Saints. After making the Saints' initial 53-man roster, he was waived on September 5, and was re-signed to the practice squad.

=== Philadelphia Eagles ===
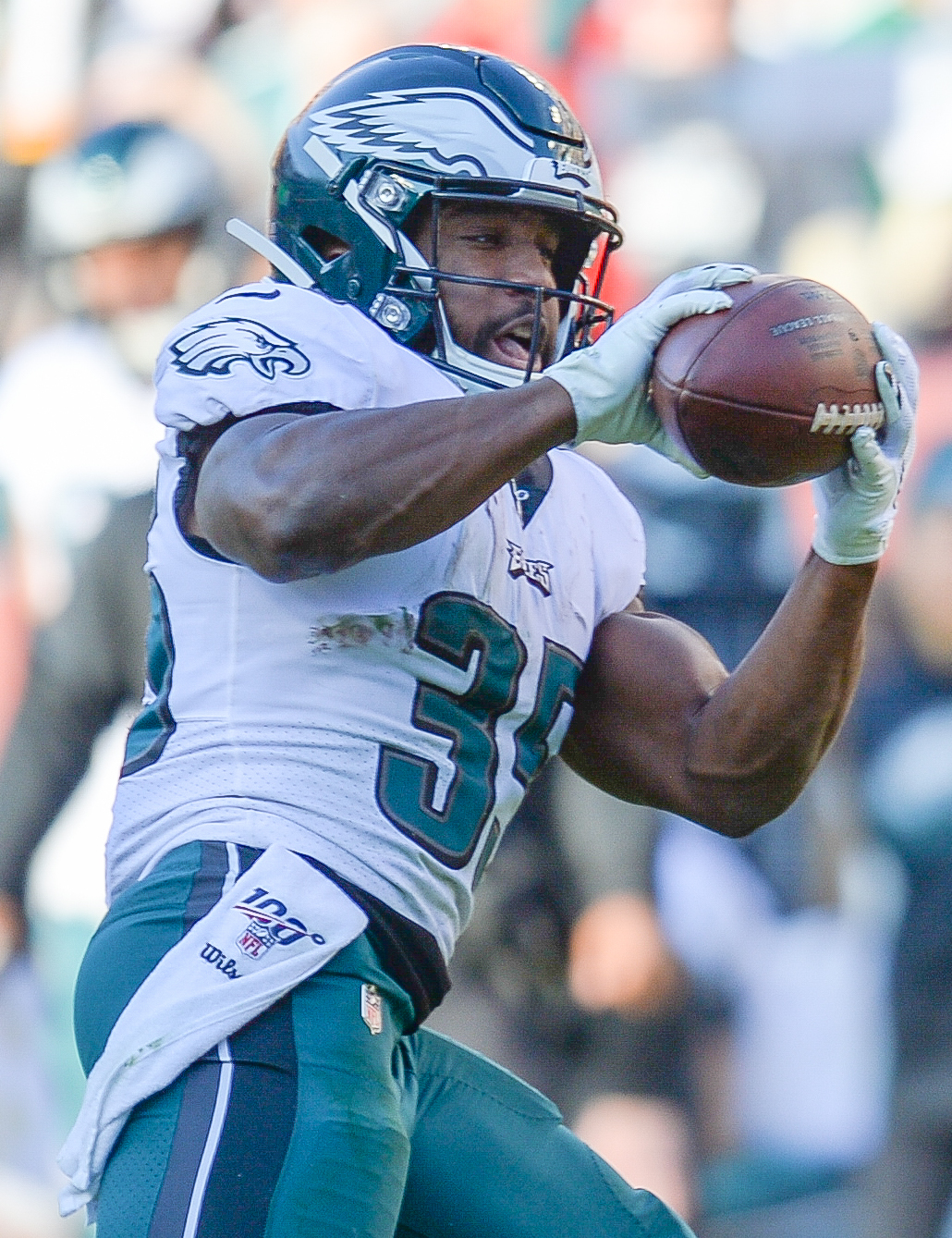
Scott with the Eagles in 2019

Scott was signed off the Saints' practice squad by the Philadelphia Eagles on December 10, 2018.

Scott was waived during final roster cuts on August 31, 2019, but was re-signed to the team's practice squad the next day. He was promoted to the active roster on October 11, 2019. Scott scored his first professional touchdown on a 4-yard run on October 27, 2019, when the Eagles defeated the Buffalo Bills 31–13. On December 9, he had an extended role in a 23–17 overtime victory over the New York Giants and had 10 carries for 59 yards and a touchdown, along with six receptions for 69 yards. In Week 17 against the Giants, Scott rushed 19 times for 54 yards and three touchdowns and caught four passes for 84 yards during the 34–17 win that clinched a playoff spot for the Eagles. He was named NFC Offensive Player of the Week for his game against the Giants. He finished the 2019 season with 61 carries for 245 rushing yards and five rushing touchdowns to go along with 24 receptions for 204 receiving yards.

Scott's performance from the previous season earned him the backup running back position for 2020. On October 22, 2020, Scott made the game-winning touchdown catch on an 18-yard pass from Carson Wentz in a 22–21 win against the Giants, finishing with 92 total yards of offense. In addition to being the Eagles primary punt returner, he ended up starting four games at the running back position in relief of Miles Sanders. He totaled 80 carries for 374 rushing yards and one rushing touchdown to go along with 25 receptions for 212 receiving yards and one receiving touchdown.

Scott signed a one-year exclusive-rights free agent tender with the Eagles on April 1, 2021. He was placed on the COVID list on January 3, 2022. He was activated one week later on January 10, missing just one game where the Eagles did not play their starters. He finished the 2021 season with 87 carries for 373 rushing yards and seven rushing touchdowns in 16 games. He scored a 34-yard rushing touchdown in the 31–15 loss to the Tampa Bay Buccaneers in the Wild Card Round of the playoffs.

On March 18, 2022, Scott re-signed with the Eagles. In the 2022 season, Scott appeared in 15 games, of which he started two. He finished with 54 carries for 217 rushing yards and three touchdowns. Scott scored a rushing touchdown in both the Divisional Round against the Giants and the NFC Championship against the San Francisco 49ers. Scott helped the Eagles reach Super Bowl LVII. In the Super Bowl, Scott had three carries for eight rushing yards and one catch for nine receiving yards in the Eagles 38–35 loss to the Kansas City Chiefs.

On March 15, 2023, Scott re-signed on another one-year contract with the Eagles.

=== Los Angeles Rams ===
On May 1, 2024, Scott signed a one-year contract with the Los Angeles Rams. He was released on August 25.

=== Pittsburgh Steelers ===
On August 30, 2024, the Pittsburgh Steelers signed Scott to their practice squad. He was released on September 13.

On March 18, 2026, after spending the entire 2025 season unsigned, Scott announced his retirement from professional football.

== NFL career statistics ==
=== Regular season ===
Year	Team	Games		Rushing					Receiving					Returning					Fumbles	
Year	Team	GP	GS	Att	Yds	Avg	Lng	TD	Rec	Yds	Avg	Lng	TD	Ret	Yds	Avg	Lng	TD	Fum	Lost
2018	PHI	2	0	0	0	0.0	0	0	0	0	0.0	0	0	4	96	24.0	35	0	0	0
2019	PHI	11	2	61	245	4.0	25	5	24	204	8.5	39	0	16	272	17.0	33	0	4	1
2020	PHI	16	4	80	374	4.7	56	1	25	212	8.5	18	1	28	590	21.1	46	0	2	0
2021	PHI	16	4	87	373	4.3	23	7	13	83	6.4	19	0	1	13	13.0	13	0	1	0
2022	PHI	15	2	54	217	4.0	21	3	5	15	3.0	5	0	15	406	27.1	66	0	0	0
2023	PHI	15	0	20	86	4.3	18	0	4	52	13.0	27	0	8	170	21.3	38	0	1	0
Career		75	12	302	1,295	4.3	56	16	71	566	8.0	39	1	66	1,504	22.8	56	0	8	1

=== Playoffs ===
Year	Team	Games		Rushing					Receiving					Returning					Fumbles	
Year	Team	GP	GS	Att	Yds	Avg	Lng	TD	Rec	Yds	Avg	Lng	TD	Ret	Yds	Avg	Lng	TD	Fum	Lost
2018	PHI	2	0	0	0	0.0	0	0	0	0	0.0	0	0	3	54	18.0	21	0	0	0
2019	PHI	1	0	6	25	4.2	15	0	3	23	7.7	21	0	1	24	24.0	24	0	0	0
2021	PHI	1	0	1	34	34.0	34	1	1	1	1.0	1	0	0	0	0	0	0	0	0
2022	PHI	3	0	15	61	4.1	10	2	1	9	9.0	9	0	1	29	29.0	29	0	0	0
2023	PHI	1	0	0	0	0.0	0	0	0	0	0.0	0	0	1	17	17.0	17	0	0	0
Career		8	0	22	120	5.5	34	3	5	33	6.6	21	0	6	121	20.2	29	0	0	0

== Esports career ==
B0ston

Personal information
- Name: Boston Scott

Current team
- Team: Dignitas
- Game: Rocket League
- League: RLCS North America

Career information
- Playing career: 2022–present

Team history
- 2022–: Dignitas

On February 3, 2022, Scott was signed to a multi-year deal with professional esports organization Dignitas as a content creator and substitute for their Rocket League roster.

== Personal life ==
On July 17, 2023, Scott posted on Instagram that he was engaged to his girlfriend Mariah Rojas, whom he met during his time at Louisiana Tech.
