= Vic Stelly =

American businessman and politician (1941–2020)

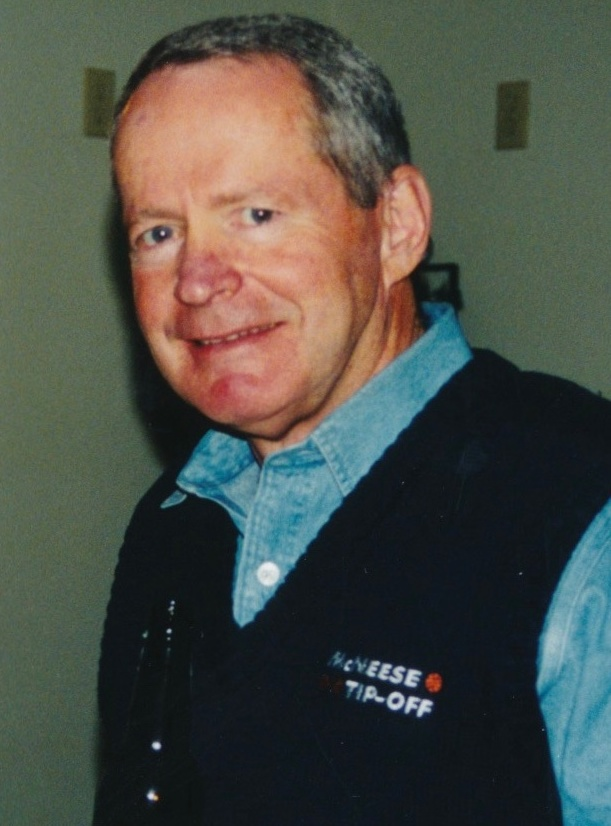
- Vic Stelly

Member of the Louisiana House of Representatives from the 35th district
- In office 1988–2004
- Preceded by: Margaret Welsh Lowenthal
- Succeeded by: Brett Frank Geymann

Member of the Louisiana Board of Regents for Higher Education
- In office 2007–2013

Personal details
- Born: Victor Theodore Stelly; January 11, 1941 Carencro, Louisiana, U.S.
- Died: December 26, 2020 (aged 79) Lake Charles, Louisiana, U.S.
- Party: Republican turned Independent
- Occupation: Politician, businessman

Victor Theodore Stelly (January 11, 1941 – December 26, 2020) was an American politician who was a member of the Louisiana House of Representatives, best known for the since repealed Stelly Plan tax-shifting amendment. He was also a member of the Louisiana Board of Regents for Higher Education from 2007 through 2013, resigning before his term ended because he was dismayed at cuts to higher education.

In 2006, Stelly was selected to the Louisiana Political Hall of Fame.

== Political career ==
Stelly authored an amendment to the Louisiana State Constitution which became known as the Stelly Plan. This amendment eliminated the state sales tax on food, drugs, and utilities and raised the state income tax. Lost state revenue was replaced with a state income tax increase primarily paid by upper bracket taxpayers.

== Personal life ==
Stelly was born in Carencro, Louisiana, and moved to Zachary, Louisiana, when he was four years old. His father, Gordon Stelly, was a petro-chemical operator, and his mother Dorothea Olive Martin Stelly, was a stay-at-home mother. He was an All-State football player at Zachary High School and graduated from Northwestern in Natchitoches where he also played football. He taught high school in Louisiana, getting his M.A. from Louisiana State University in 1965. Stelly was also an insurance agent for 25 years in Moss Bluff.

=== Death ===
Stelly died from complications of COVID-19 on December 26, 2020, during the COVID-19 pandemic in Louisiana, just 15 hours before his wife Terry died of the same illness and sixteen days short of his 80th birthday.

His papers are held by the Archives and Special Collections Department of the Frazar Memorial Library at McNeese State University.
