= Douglas Coleman III =

American gridiron football player (born 1998)

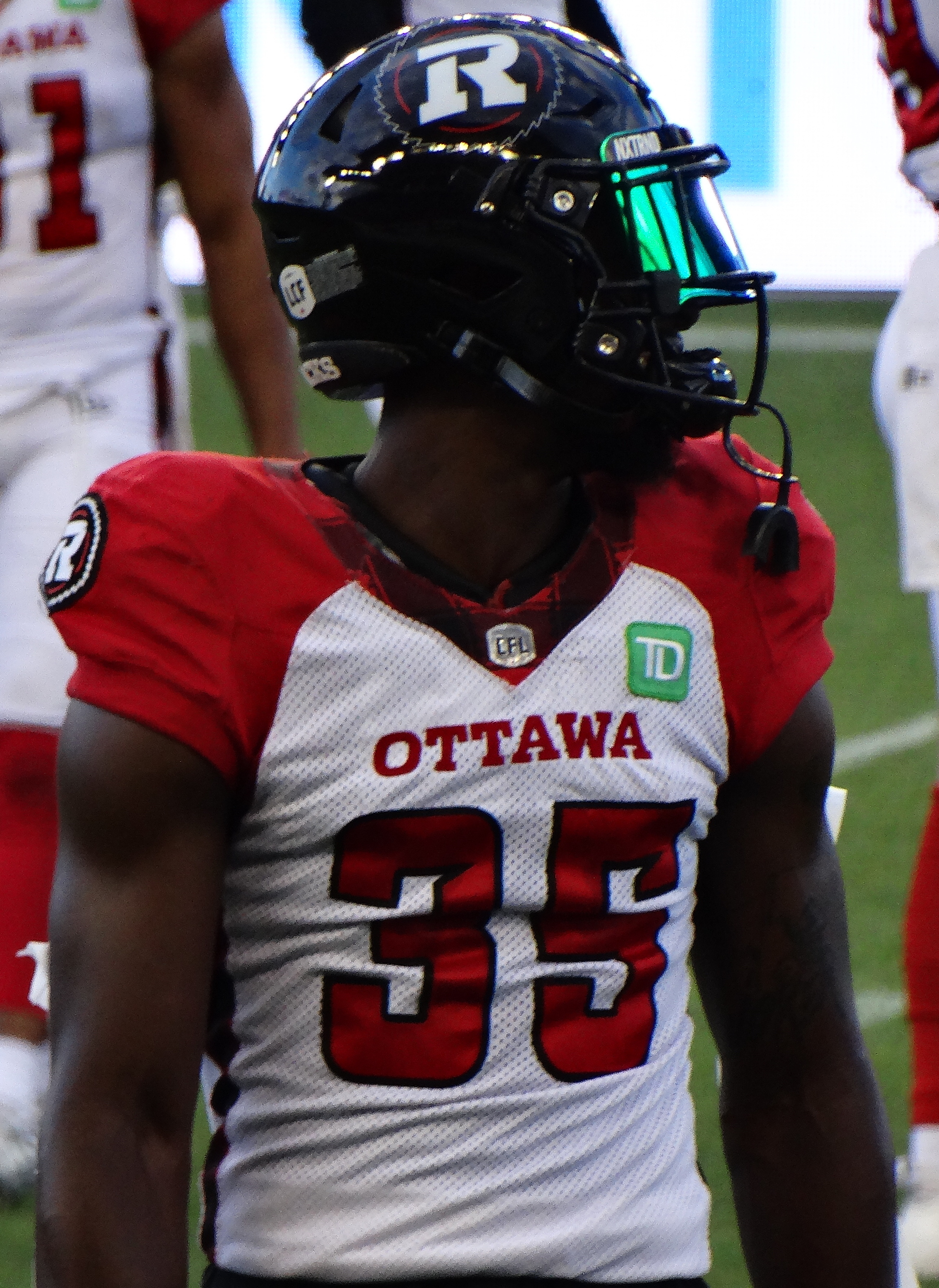
- Coleman with the Ottawa Redblacks in 2023

Profile
- Position: Safety

Personal information
- Born: June 28, 1998 (age 28); Zachary, Louisiana, U.S.
- Listed height: 6 ft 1 in (1.85 m)
- Listed weight: 200 lb (91 kg)

Career information
- High school: Zachary (LA)
- College: Texas Tech (2016–2019)
- NFL draft: 2020: undrafted

Career history
- Denver Broncos (2020)*; Ottawa Redblacks (2021–2023); Chicago Bears (2024)
- * Offseason or practice squad member only

Awards and highlights
- First-team All-Big 12 (2019)
- Stats at CFL.ca

Douglas M. Coleman III (born June 28, 1998) is an American professional football safety. He played college football for the Texas Tech Red Raiders. He has been a member of the Denver Broncos and Chicago Bears of the National Football League (NFL), and the Ottawa Redblacks of the Canadian Football League (CFL).

== Early life ==
Douglas M. Coleman III played high school football at Zachary High School in Zachary, Louisiana as a wide receiver and defensive back. He caught 62 passes for 1,482 yards and 15 touchdowns his senior year.

== College career ==
Coleman played college football at Texas Tech from 2016 to 2019 as a defensive back, spending the majority of his first three seasons at nickelback before converting to safety his senior year. He played in 11 games, starting three, in 2016, recording 26 tackles, one sack, one interception, six pass breakups, one forced fumble and one fumble recovery, earning Athlon Sports second team freshmen All-Big 12 Conference honors. He played in 12 games, starting four, in 2017, accumulating 22 tackles, one interception, one pass breakup, one forced fumble and two fumble recoveries. Coleman appeared in 12 games, starting six, in 2018, totaling 30 tackles, one interception, seven pass breakups. He started 12 games at safety his senior season in 2019, recording 63 tackles, eight interceptions, and two pass breakups, garnering first team All-Big 12 recognition.

== Professional career ==
Pre-draft measurables
Height	Weight	Arm length	Hand span
6 ft 0 1/8 in (1.83 m)	203 lb (92 kg)	33 in (0.84 m)	10 1/4 in (0.26 m)
All values from Pro Day

=== Denver Broncos ===
Coleman signed with the Denver Broncos of the National Football League (NFL) on April 29, 2020, after going undrafted in the 2020 NFL draft. He was released on September 5, 2020.

=== Ottawa Redblacks ===
Coleman was signed by the Ottawa Redblacks of the Canadian Football League (CFL) on October 11, 2021. He was moved to the practice roster on October 19, and did not appear in any games for the Redblacks during the 2021 season. He signed a futures contract on November 20, 2021. Coleman was released by the Redblacks on June 5, 2022, and signed to the practice roster on June 13. He moved to linebacker in 2022, and was transferred between the practice roster, active roster and injured reserve several times during the 2022 season. Overall, he played in five games, all starts, for the Redblacks in 2022, totaling 18 tackles on defense and one sack. In 2023, Coleman was named to the CFL's Week 4 Honour Roll at linebacker, and also the monthly Honour Roll for June at linebacker. He appeared in 17 games, all starts, in 2023, recording 60 tackles on defense, four sacks, three interceptions, one interception return touchdown, and one fumble return touchdown.

=== Chicago Bears ===
Coleman signed with the Chicago Bears of the NFL on January 10, 2024. During a preseason game on August 22, 2024, against the Kansas City Chiefs, Coleman was injured on the first play of the third quarter. After making a tackle on wide receiver Cornell Powell, Coleman was unable to move any of his limbs. As both teams gathered around him, he was placed on a stretcher and rushed to the hospital. After the game, Bears coach Matt Eberflus stated that Coleman had movement in his limbs. He was released from the hospital and returned to Chicago the next day. He was waived with an injury designation on August 24, 2024, and reverted to injured reserve on August 28, 2024.
