= Zachary Community School Board =

School district in Louisiana, United States

Location
- 3755 Church Street, Zachary, LA 70791 United States
- Coordinates: 30.6517°N 91.1645°W

District information
- Type: Public
- Grades: Pre-K-12
- Established: 2002
- Superintendent: Ben Necaise
- Schools: 7
- NCES District ID: 2200039

Students and staff
- Students: 5,551
- Teachers: 300.89
- Staff: 213.78
- Student–teacher ratio: 18.45

Other information
- Website: www.zacharyschools.org

ZCSD (ZCSD), or Zachary Community School Board is a school district in Zachary, Louisiana, United States. In addition to Zachary it serves some unincorporated areas around it.

The Zachary Community School System was founded in 2002 and was formed from schools that had been located in the East Baton Rouge Parish School District. The schools in this system are located within the City of Zachary; however, the school district boundaries include areas outside of the incorporated City of Zachary.

Since 2005, the school system has been recognized by the Louisiana Department of Education as the top system in Louisiana.

== Elementary schools ==
- Zachary Early Learning Center (Pre-Kindergarten)
- Northwestern Elementary School (Kindergarten)
- Rollins Place Elementary School (Grade 1-2)
- Zachary Elementary School (Grade 3-4)
- Copper Mill Elementary School (Grade 5-6)

== Secondary schools ==
- Northwestern Middle School
- Zachary High School
- Port Hudson Career Academy
