= Victor Jones (running back) =

American football player (born 1967)

No. 37, 30, 31, 46
- Position: Running back

Personal information
- Born: December 5, 1967 (age 58); Baton Rouge, Louisiana, U.S.
- Listed height: 5 ft 8 in (1.73 m)
- Listed weight: 212 lb (96 kg)

Career information
- High school: Zachary (Zachary, Louisiana)
- College: LSU (1985–1989)
- NFL draft: 1990: undrafted

Career history
- Houston Oilers (1990); New England Patriots (1991)*; Houston Oilers (1991); Denver Broncos (1992); New York Giants (1993)*; Pittsburgh Steelers (1993–1994); Kansas City Chiefs (1994)
- * Offseason or practice squad member only
- Stats at Pro Football Reference

Victor Tyrone Jones (born December 5, 1967) is an American former professional football running back who played five seasons in the National Football League (NFL) with the Houston Oilers, Denver Broncos, Pittsburgh Steelers and Kansas City Chiefs. Jones played college football at Louisiana State University. He mostly played special teams during his NFL career.

== Early life and college ==
Victor Tyrone Jones was born on December 5, 1967, in Baton Rouge, Louisiana. He attended Zachary High School in Zachary, Louisiana.

Jones played college football for the LSU Tigers of Louisiana State University. He was a letterman in 1985, 1987, 1988, and 1989. As a true freshman in 1985, he rushed 20 times for 100 yards while also returning two kicks for 49 yards. Jones only carries three times for 19 yards and one touchdown in 1986 and missed most of the season due to a torn knee ligament. In 1987, he recorded 68 rushing attempts for 272 yards and seven touchdowns and three receptions for 18 yards. He rushed 46 times for 103 yards and two touchdowns in 1988 while also catching seven passes for 59 yards. As a senior in 1989, Jones totaled 38 carries for 152 yards and one touchdown and two catches for 29 yards.

== Professional career ==
Jones signed with the Houston Oilers on May 15, 1990, after going undrafted in the 1990 NFL draft. He was released on September 2 but signed to the team's practice squad the next day. He was promoted to the active roster on October 2, 1990. Jones played in ten games for the Oilers during the 1990 season, rushing 14 times for 75 yards while fumbling once. He also appeared in one playoff game that year and became a free agent after the 1990 season.

Jones was signed by the New England Patriots on April 1, 1991. He was later released on August 26, 1991.

Jones signed with the Oilers again on September 4, 1991. He played in 14 games for the Oilers in 1991 and returned one kick for seven yards. He played in two postseason games as well. He became a free agent again after the season and re-signed with the Oilers. Jones was released on August 31, 1992.

Jones was signed by the Denver Broncos on September 1, 1992. He appeared in all 16 games, starting one, for the Broncos in 1992, catching three passes for 17 yards on three targets while also recovering two fumbles.

Jones became a free agent after the 1992 season and signed with the New York Giants on April 22, 1993. He was released on August 23, 1993.

Jones signed with the Pittsburgh Steelers on August 31, 1993. He played in all 16 games for the Steelers during the 1993 season and led the team in special teams tackles with 15. He was placed on injured reserve with a pectoral muscle injury on January 4, 1994, before the Steelers' Wildcard playoff game. Jones appeared in ten games for Pittsburgh in 1994 before being released on November 16, 1994.

Jones was then signed by the Kansas City Chiefs on November 23, 1994. He played in one game for the Chiefs before being placed on injured serve for the second year in a row on November 30, 1994. On July 24, 1995, he was placed on injured reserve for the third straight season. Jones then decided to retire.

== Personal life ==
Jones first worked in the auto sales industry after his NFL career. He later transitioned to disaster residential and commercial inspections.
