= Environmental Waste Solutions =

Business in Baton Rouge, Louisiana

Environmental Waste Solutions LLC.
- Company type: Private company
- Industry: Business consulting
- Founded: Baton Rouge, Louisiana (1994)
- Founder: Darwyn Williams
- Headquarters: Baton Rouge, Louisiana, United States
- Area served: North America
- Products: Business waste consulting, affiliate training
- Website: www.environmental-waste.com

Environmental Waste Solutions (EWS) is a private U.S. small business headquartered in Baton Rouge, Louisiana, which specializes in assisting businesses in becoming more environmentally friendly. The company can be seen as one approach to environmental consulting, a growing international industry specialized in aiding home owners and businesses in their adjustment to an increasingly green economy. Environmental consulting agencies like EWS also contend with issues such as the triple bottom line and sustainability.

The company's business model can be looked at as an example of both eco-capitalism and upcycling – in the respect that EWS will assist businesses in listing unused materials in a material exchange program, to source those materials and create something new and more environmentally friendly than simply disposing of the material as "waste".

== Founding ==
Environmental Waste Solutions was founded in 1994 by Darwyn Williams.

The initial idea for the EWS business model came from Williams' first entrepreneurial pursuit, where his business plan was focused on helping businesses in the Baton Rouge area to save money on their over-assessed property taxes at no cost other than a portion of their savings. After experiencing some success with his business model, Williams created Environmental Waste Solutions in 1994 with the goal of extending his model to a more national scale while simultaneously contributing to the burgeoning green movement.

After witnessing the early success of its environmentally friendly business plan, Environmental Waste Solutions began marketing it as a business that other entrepreneurs could buy into and implement in their own locales across the United States. Independent affiliates, known internally as "independent waste consultants" pay about $26,000 to learn the basics from the business and then operate their own waste consulting businesses as they please. Additionally, after being trained with the proprietary skills Williams' utilized to form the business, EWS offers continued support and also assists independent affiliates should they eventually come to consult businesses with more complex waste streams. Williams reports that training aspiring entrepreneurs the intricacies of the company's environmentally friendly business model has been one of the company's most successful endeavors.

Since its inception, Environmental Waste Solutions has been honored in Inc. (magazine)'s Inc. 5000 list of America's Fastest Growing Private Companies. Currently, Environmental Waste Solution's main office is located in Baton Rouge, Louisiana.
