= Darwyn Williams =

American businessman

- Born: January 15, 1960 (age 66); Sulphur, Louisiana, USA
- Occupation: CEO of Environmental Waste Solutions
- Awards: Inc. 500 Award from (Inc. Magazine)
- Website: www.Darwyn-Williams.com

Darwyn Williams (born January 15, 1960), is an American businessman, the president and CEO for Environmental Waste Solutions since 1994. After working in the real estate industry, Williams started Environmental Waste Solutions with the goal of helping businesses go green. Today, he is responsible for affiliate training, expansion behind North America, and joint ventures with EWS affiliates for larger businesses with more complex recycling requirements.

Williams was previously involved with Combined Resource Technology, a real estate company in Baton Rouge. Williams has served as a board member for a number of non-profit organizations and is an active community volunteer. Williams has frequently spoken on entrepreneurship and has been featured in Inc. Magazine, Entrepreneur Magazine, Business Start-Ups Magazine, Opportunity Magazine, and Small Business Opportunities Magazine.

== Biography ==
=== Early life ===
Williams was born in Sulphur, Louisiana in 1960 and attended Zachary High School in Zachary, LA (a suburb of Baton Rouge, LA). He attended Louisiana Tech University in Ruston, LA and later served on the Louisiana Board of Regents – Louisiana’s Higher Education governing board – where he served on the Facilities Planning Committee and the Budget Committee for the Regents. He graduated in 1982 with a degree in Business Law and Economics.

=== Combined Resource Technology ===
Combined Resource Technology (CRT), Williams' first foray into entrepreneurship, began as a corporate cost cutting business. Under the CRT's business model, which would later be adapted to Environmental Waste Solutions Williams assisted Baton Rouge businesses whose property had been over assessed. While those businesses spent nothing out of pocket for this service, CRT earned half of what they would save

=== Environmental Waste Solutions ===
After experiencing success with CRT, Williams saw the growth of the recycling industry and formed Environmental Waste Solutions (EWS) in 1994. Knowing that solid waste disposal would be a growing expense area for businesses across the country, the business model for his new company was focused on cutting those costs while helping businesses go green.
