= Jarrid Williams =

American football player (born 1997)

Profile
- Position: Offensive tackle

Personal information
- Born: July 2, 1997 (age 29); Cedar Hill, Texas, U.S.
- Listed height: 6 ft 6 in (1.98 m)
- Listed weight: 308 lb (140 kg)

Career information
- High school: Cedar Hill (TX)
- College: Houston (2015–2019); Miami (FL) (2020–2021)
- NFL draft: 2022: undrafted

Career history
- Philadelphia Eagles (2022)*; Detroit Lions (2022)*; Philadelphia Eagles (2023)*; Pittsburgh Steelers (2023)*; Minnesota Vikings (2023)*; San Antonio Brahmas (2024)*; DC Defenders (2024–2025); Orlando Storm (2026)*
- * Offseason or practice squad member only

Awards and highlights
- UFL champion (2025)
- Stats at Pro Football Reference

Jarrid Williams (born July 2, 1997) is an American football offensive tackle. He played college football at Houston and Miami (FL).

== Early life and college ==
Williams grew up in Cedar Hill, Texas, and attended Cedar Hill High School, where he earned varsity letters in two years. He played defense and made 109 total tackles on the football team, being named second-team all-district in 2014. He was a two-star recruit according to Rivals.com, Scout.com, and 247Sports.

Williams committed to the University of Houston and spent his first season (2015) as a redshirt. In 2016, he played in eight games. Williams appeared in three games during the 2017 season. In 2018, he earned a starting role, playing as starter in thirteen games. He started four games in 2019 before suffering a season-ending injury.

In 2020, Williams announced his intention to graduate transfer. In June of that year, Williams transferred to the University of Miami. As a redshirt-senior with Miami, Williams started in every game. In 2021, Williams announced he would return for a seventh season of college football, as an extra year of eligibility was given due to COVID-19.

== Professional career ==
=== Philadelphia Eagles (first stint) ===
After going unselected in the 2022 NFL draft, Williams was signed by the Philadelphia Eagles as an undrafted free agent. He was released on July 27. He was brought back on August 7, 2022. Williams was released for the second time on August 23. On September 16, the Eagles signed Williams to the practice squad. Later being placed on the practice squad injured reserve list, he was released along with Auden Tate on November 22.

=== Detroit Lions ===
On December 29, 2022, Williams was signed to the Detroit Lions practice squad.

=== Philadelphia Eagles (second stint) ===
On January 24, 2023, Williams signed a reserve/future contract with the Philadelphia Eagles. He was released on May 16.

=== Pittsburgh Steelers ===
On June 5, 2023, Williams signed with the Pittsburgh Steelers. He was released on July 30.

=== Minnesota Vikings ===
On August 3, 2023, Williams signed with the Minnesota Vikings. He was waived on August 28, 2023.

=== San Antonio Brahmas ===
On January 19, 2024, Williams signed with the San Antonio Brahmas of the United Football League (UFL). He was waived on March 22, 2024.

=== DC Defenders ===
On April 3, 2024, Williams signed with the DC Defenders of the United Football League (UFL). He re-signed with the team on October 3, 2024.

=== Orlando Storm ===
On January 13, 2026, Williams was selected by the Orlando Storm in the 2026 UFL Draft. He was released on March 19.
