= Le Blanc (surname) =

The surname le Blanc, LeBlanc or Leblanc may refer to:

- Abel LeBlanc (born c. 1936), Canadian politician
- Abraham LeBlanc (1840–1913), Canadian merchant and political figure
- Adrian Nicole LeBlanc, American journalist
- Agapit Leblanc (1887–1926), Canadian fishery officer
- Alfred LeBlanc (1869–1921), French aviator
- Amy K. LeBlanc, American veterinary oncologist and cancer biology researcher
- André LeBlanc (artist) (1921–1998), Haitian comic artist
- André LeBlanc (DC Comics), jewelry thief in DC Comics
- Angela LeBlanc, Canadian writer and freelance literary reviewer, also known as Angela Narth
- Annie LeBlanc (born 1992), Canadian middle-distance runner
- Anthony LeBlanc, Canadian sports executive
- Antoine le Blanc (c. 1800–1833), American murderer
- Armand LeBlanc (1921–2004), American politician
- Arthur LeBlanc (born 1943), 33rd Lieutenant Governor of Nova Scotia
- Azor LeBlanc (1927–2011), Canadian business owner and political figure
- Bart le Blanc (born 1946), Dutch economist
- Benjamin Amedeé LeBlanc (1879–1946), Canadian physician and political figure
- Bernard LeBlanc (born 1949), Canadian politician
- Bertin LeBlanc (born 1945), Canadian politician
- Bertrand LeBlanc, Canadian politician
- Bob LeBlanc (born 1962), American football player
- Camille Leblanc-Bazinet (born 1988), Canadian CrossFit Games athlete
- Carl LeBlanc (born 1955), American guitarist and banjo player
- Cassandra Beth "Casey" LeBlanc (born 1987), Canadian recording artist
- Charles Leblanc (born 1996), Canadian baseball player
- Christian LeBlanc (born 1958), American actor
- Clarence White (born Clarence Joseph LeBlanc; 1944–1973), American bluegrass and country guitarist and singer
- Claude le Blanc (1669–1728), French royal official
- Daniel LeBlanc (disambiguation), several people
- Daniel Wallace LeBlanc (1930–2013), American lawyer and jurist
- Deborah LeBlanc, American horror author
- Diana Fowler LeBlanc (born 1940), widow of Romeo LeBlanc
- Diana Leblanc (born 1943), Canadian actress
- Dominic LeBlanc (born 1967), Canadian politician
- Drew LeBlanc (born 1989), American ice hockey player
- Dudley J. LeBlanc (1894–1971), Louisiana state senator and the developer of Hadacol
- Dylan LeBlanc (born 1990), American singer
- Edgard Leblanc Fils (born 1955), Haitian politician
- Edward Oliver LeBlanc (1923–2004), Dominican politician
- Evée LeBlanc (1878–1978), Canadian fishing captain
- Francis LeBlanc (born 1953), member of the House of Commons of Canada from 1988 to 1997
- Fred S. LeBlanc (1897–1969), Louisiana attorney general and mayor of Baton Rouge
- Fridayy (born as Francis Leblanc in 2000), Haitian-American singer, songwriter, and record producer
- Gaston Thomas LeBlanc (1941–1980), Canadian politician
- George LeBlanc, (1955–2026), mayor of Moncton, New Brunswick, Canada
- Guillaume LeBlanc (born 1962), Canadian athlete who mainly competed in the 20 kilometre walk
- Guy LeBlanc (born 1960), Canadian keyboardist, member of rock bands Nathan Mahl and Camel
- Guy LeBlanc (Nova Scotia politician) (born 1950), Canadian politician
- Guy LeBlanc (Quebec politician), Mayor of Trois-Rivières from 1990 to 2001
- Győző Leblanc (born 1947), Hungarian tenor opera singer, actor and director
- Hélène LeBlanc (born 1958), Canadian politician
- Henry S. LeBlanc (1865–1946), Canadian merchant and political figure
- Hubert Le Blanc (fl. 1740s), French viol player
- Isidore LeBlanc (1837–1919), Acadian politician, ship owner and merchant
- Jacob LeBlanc (born 1981), American professional soccer player
- Jacques LeBlanc (boxer) (born 1964), Canadian boxer
- James LeBlanc, American actor
- Janique LeBlanc, Canadian curler
- Jean-Bernard, abbé Le Blanc (1707–1787), French art critic
- Jean-Paul LeBlanc (ice hockey) (born 1946), Canadian professional ice hockey player
- Jean-Paul LeBlanc (politician) (1923–2021), Canadian politician
- Jean-Marie Leblanc (born 1944), French cyclist and director of the Tour de France
- Jeanne Leblanc (born 1978), Canadian film director and screenwriter
- Jeff LeBlanc (born 1986), American independent singer and songwriter
- Jimmie LeBlanc (born 1977), Canadian composer and guitarist
- Jean (John) B. LeBlanc (born 1939), Canadian jockey in Thoroughbred horse racing
- John LeBlanc (born 1964), Canadian professional ice hockey left winger
- José Leblanc (1894–1922), Cuban baseball player
- Judith M. LeBlanc (born 1936), American psychologist, teacher, and special education researcher
- Jules LeBlanc (born 2004), American YouTuber, actress, singer, model, and internet personality
- Julius LeBlanc Stewart (1855–1919), American artist
- Karen LeBlanc, Canadian film, television and musical theatre actress
- Karina LeBlanc (born 1980), Canadian soccer goalkeeper
- Keith LeBlanc, American drummer and record producer
- Ken Leblanc (disambiguation), several people
- Larry LeBlanc, music journalist
- Lenny LeBlanc (born 1951), American musician and songwriter
- Leo LeBlanc (1939–1995), American musician
- Lisa LeBlanc (born 1990), Canadian singer-songwriter
- Louis César de La Baume Le Blanc (1708–1780), French nobleman
- Louis Guy LeBlanc (1921–1990), Liberal party member of the House of Commons of Canada
- Louis Jean Joseph Leblanc (born 1991), Canadian retired professional ice hockey centre
- Louise Profeit-LeBlanc (born 1951), Aboriginal storyteller
- Lucie Leblanc (born 1962), Canadian politician
- Marc LeBlanc, educator about and designer of video games
- Marie-Angélique Memmie Le Blanc (1712–1775), French feral child
- Mario LeBlanc (born 1977), Acadian musician, known under his stage name Fayo
- Marlon LeBlanc (born 1976), American soccer coach
- Marthe Renard, née Leblanc (b. 1903), French pharmacist who worked in Marie Curie's laboratory on the separation of plutonium
- Matt LeBlanc (born 1967), American actor, known for playing Joey Tribbiani in the sitcom Friends and Joey, and himself in Episodes
- Maurice Leblanc (1857–1923) French engineer and industrialist
- Maurice Leblanc (1864–1941), French novelist
- Maurice Le Blanc-Smith (1896–1986), British World War I flying ace
- Michael LeBlanc (born 1987), Canadian track athlete specializing in the 100 metres
- Michel Leblanc (ice hockey) (born 1959), French ice hockey player
- Monique LeBlanc, Canadian politician
- Moreland le Blanc (born 1989), Sint Maarten cricketer
- Neil LeBlanc (born 1956), Canadian politician
- Nicolas Leblanc (1742–1806), French chemist and surgeon
- Nicole M. LeBlanc, head milliner of Fleur de Paris in New Orleans
- Olivier J. Leblanc (1830–1919), Canadian politician of Acadian descent
- Ovide Le Blanc (1801–1870), Canadian notary and politician
- Paul LeBlanc (hairstylist), make-up artist who won an Oscar for Amadeus
- Paul LeBlanc (university president), current president of Southern New Hampshire University
- Paul Le Blanc (historian) (born 1947), American historian
- Peter LeBlanc (ice hockey) (born 1988), Canadian professional ice hockey forward
- Peter LeBlanc (born 1938), Canadian chartered accountant and political figure
- Philibert LeBlanc (1890–1964), Canadian politician
- Pierre LeBlanc (c. 1720 – 1799), Acadian pioneer and co-founder of Pointe-de-l'Église
- Raymond Leblanc (1915–2008), Belgian film director
- Richard LeBlanc (born 1958), American Democratic member of the Michigan State House of Representatives
- Richard LeBlanc (born 1955), Canadian politician, also known as Cy LeBlanc
- Rita Benson LeBlanc (born 1977), vice chairman of the board of the New Orleans Saints of the National Football League
- Roman Lee LeBlanc (born 1971), American politician
- Roméo LeBlanc (1927–2009), Canadian Governor General
- Samuel A. LeBlanc I (1886–1955), Louisiana politician and judge
- Stanley le Blanc Smith (1849–1922), English rower
- Steven A. LeBlanc (born 1943), American archaeologist, author
- Suzie LeBlanc (born 1961), Canadian soprano and early music specialist
- Wade LeBlanc (born 1984), American baseball pitcher
