= Kumerow =

Kumerow is a surname. Notable people with the surname include:

- Eric Kumerow (born 1965), American football linebacker
- Jake Kumerow (born 1992), American football wide receiver, son of Eric
