= Daniel LeBlanc (settler) =

Early Acadian settler (1626–1696)

- Born: c. 1626; Martaizé, Poitou-Charentes, France
- Died: c. 1696 (aged 68–72); Port Royal, Acadia (present Nova Scotia), New France
- Burial place: Garrison Cemetery, Annapolis Royal, Nova Scotia, Canada
- Occupations: Farmer, Administrator
- Spouse: Françoise Gaudet (1623-1699)
- Children: 7

Daniel LeBlanc (1626–1696) was an early Acadian settler and administrator of the Port Royal area of Acadia, present day Nova Scotia. He is the original ancestor of the Leblanc’s of North America.

== Biography ==
Daniel LeBlanc was born in Martaizé, France, in 1626. The LeBlanc surname was originally spelt as Le Blanc before being changed.

Daniel left France for New France with Charles d'Aulnay in 1645, he arrived in Acadia and settled on the north bank of the Port-Royal River (now the Annapolis River), to the northeast of the marsh at Belisle, about 15 kilometers above the fort at Port Royal and about a half mile below the chapel of St-Laurent. In 1650, he married Françoise Gaudet, a widow with a small daughter, Marie Gaudet, from her previous marriage. Together, they became parents to one daughter and six sons.

Children of Daniel and Françoise:

1. Jacques LeBlanc, Born in 1651 in Port Royal. (Grandfather of Pierre LeBlanc)
2. Françoise LeBlanc, Born in 1653 in Port Royal.
3. Étienne LeBlanc, Born in 1656 in Port Royal.
4. René LeBlanc, Born in 1657 in Port Royal.
5. Andre LeBlanc, Born in 1659 in Port Royal.
6. Antoine LeBlanc, Born in 1662 in Port Royal. (Father of Joseph Leblanc dit Le Maigre)
7. Pierre LeBlanc, Born in 1664 in Port Royal.

LeBlanc became a well-respected and relatively prosperous farmer in Port-Royal. Around 1690, he became a member of a group of six commissioners who were charged with providing administrative and judicial oversight for the colony. Along with his neighbors, he was caught up in the settlement's shifting political fortunes resulting from international conflict between France and England. In 1695, after a regime change, LeBlanc signed an oath of allegiance to the King of England.

Daniel LeBlanc died at Port-Royal sometime between the oath of 1695 and the census of 1698.

== Descendants ==
By 1755, the descendants of Daniel LeBlanc had created the largest family in Acadia. Le Grand Dérangement (The Great Expulsion) of the 1750s scattered this huge family to the winds. Since most of the LeBlancs lived in the Minas settlements, dozens of them fell into the hands of the British in the fall of 1755 and ended up on ships bound for Maryland, Virginia, and other English colonies down the Atlantic seaboard. Many LeBlancs were exiled to France and then about 1785, along with Acadian families carrying other surnames, left aboard ships for then Spanish Louisiana; some of these LeBlancs gave testimony in France to a Catholic Priest who carefully recorded their oral testimony of who their ancestors were (since the Catholic and Civil records were unavailable, destroyed, or lost due to their mistreatment by the British authorities).

LeBlancs were among the first families of Acadia and some of the earliest Acadians to find refuge in Louisiana. The first descendants of Daniel LeBlanc to emigrate to the colony reached New Orleans in February 1765 with the party from Halifax via Saint-Domingue led by Joseph Broussard dit Beausoleil. After a brief stay in the city, during which one of them exchanged his Canadian card money for Louisiana funds, they followed the Broussards to the Atakapas District, where they helped created La Nouvelle-Acadie on the banks of Bayou Teche. Other LeBlancs came to Louisiana from Acadia via France in 1785. Most of the LeBlancs in Louisiana are direct descendants of Daniel LeBlanc and Francoise Gaudet. It is now estimated that there are somewhere between 300,000 and 500,000 descendants scattered over all the continents of the globe, the biggest concentration being in Canada (in the provinces of New Brunswick, Nova Scotia and Quebec) and the United States of America (in Louisiana and the states of New England).
