= Daniel LeBlanc =

Daniel LeBlanc may refer to:

- Daniel LeBlanc (musician), cartoonist and member of band Grand Dérangement
- Daniel LeBlanc (settler), early settler of the Port Royal area of Acadia
- Daniel W. LeBlanc (1931–2013), American jurist
