= Tony Accardo =

American mob boss (1906–1992)

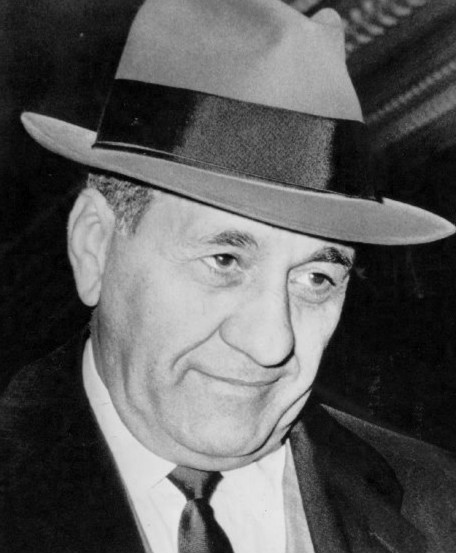
- Accardo in 1960
- Born: Antonino Leonardo Accardo; April 28, 1906; Chicago, Illinois, U.S.
- Died: May 22, 1992 (aged 86); Chicago, Illinois, U.S.
- Resting place: Queen of Heaven Cemetery, Hillside, Illinois, U.S.
- Other names: "Joe Batters"; "Big Tuna"; "Tough Tony"
- Occupation: Crime boss
- Spouse: Clarice Pordzany (m. 1934)
- Children: 4
- Relatives: Nick Bosa (great-grandson); Joey Bosa (great-grandson); John Bosa (grandson-in-law); Palmer Pyle (son-in-law); Eric Kumerow (grandson); Jake Kumerow (great-grandson)
- Allegiance: Chicago Outfit

Anthony Joseph Accardo (/əˈkɑːrdoʊ/; born Antonino Leonardo Accardo, Italian: [antoˈniːno leoˈnardo akˈkardo]; April 28, 1906 – May 22, 1992), also known as "Joe Batters" and "Big Tuna," was a mobster in the American Mafia. In a criminal career that spanned nearly eight decades, Accardo rose from small-time hoodlum to the position of day-to-day boss of the Chicago Outfit in 1947, to ultimately becoming the power behind the throne in the Outfit by 1972. Accardo moved the Outfit into new operations and territories, significantly increasing its power and wealth during his tenure as boss.

== Early life ==
Tony Accardo was born on April 28, 1906, in Chicago's Near West Side, the second of six children of shoemaker Francesco Accardo and Maria Tilotta Accardo. One year before his birth, the Accardos had emigrated to the United States from Castelvetrano, in the Province of Trapani, Sicily, Italy. At age 14, Accardo left school and started loitering around neighborhood pool halls. He soon joined the Circus Cafe Gang, run by Claude Maddox and Tony Capezio, one of many street gangs in Chicago's impoverished neighborhoods. These gangs served as talent pools (similar to the concept of farm teams) for the city's adult criminal organizations. Jack "Machine Gun" McGurn, one of the toughest hitmen of crime boss Al Capone, recruited Accardo into his crew, along with longtime associate Tony Mazlack of Gary, Indiana.

== Career ==
=== Capone regime ===
During Prohibition, Accardo gained the nickname "Joe Batters" after using a baseball bat to murder three mobsters who had betrayed the Chicago Outfit. In 1939, Chicago newspapers dubbed Accardo "The Big Tuna" after he participated in a fishing expedition to Wedgeport, Nova Scotia, Canada, where he caught a giant 400-pound tuna and was photographed with his catch. In later years, Accardo boasted over federal wiretaps that he participated in the infamous 1929 St. Valentine's Day Massacre in which, allegedly, Capone gunmen murdered seven members of rival Bugs Moran's North Side Gang. He also claimed that he was one of the gunmen who murdered Brooklyn gang boss Frankie Yale, again by Capone's orders to settle a dispute. However, most experts believe Accardo had only peripheral connections, if any, with the St. Valentine's Day Massacre and none whatsoever with the Yale murder, which was most likely committed by Gus Winkler, Fred Burke and Louis Campagna. However, on October 11, 1926, Accardo may have participated in the assassination of Northside gang leader Hymie Weiss near the Holy Name Cathedral in Chicago.

In 1932, Capone was convicted of tax evasion and sent to prison for eleven years, and Frank "The Enforcer" Nitti became the new Outfit boss after serving his own eighteen-month sentence for the same offense. By this time, Accardo had established a solid record of making money for the organization, so Nitti allowed him to establish his own crew. Accardo was also named as the Outfit's head of enforcement. He soon developed a variety of profitable rackets, including gambling, loansharking, bookmaking, extortion and the distribution of untaxed alcohol and cigarettes. As with all caporegimes (captains), Accardo received five percent of the crew's earnings as a so-called "street tax." Accardo, in turn, paid a tax to Nitti. If a crew member refused to pay a street tax (or paid less than half of the amount owed), they would be killed. Accardo's crew included future Outfit heavyweights Gus "Gussie" Alex and Joseph "Joey Doves" Aiuppa.

=== Chicago boss ===
In the 1940s, Accardo continued to gain power in the Outfit. As the decade progressed, senior members of the organization were investigated and charged with using the threat of strike action by the labor unions they controlled to extort millions of dollars from Hollywood studios. Nitti, who was claustrophobic and fearful of serving a second prison term, committed suicide in 1943. Paul "The Waiter" Ricca, who had been the de facto boss since Capone's imprisonment, took the role officially and named Accardo as underboss. Ricca and Accardo ran the Outfit for thirty years until Ricca's death in 1972. When Ricca subsequently received a ten-year prison sentence for his part in the Hollywood scandal, Accardo became acting boss. Three years later, when Ricca was barred from contact with mobsters as a condition for his parole, Accardo became boss of the Outfit; in practice, he shared power with Ricca, who remained in the background as a senior consultant. In 1946 he attended the Havana Conference in Cuba.

Under Accardo's leadership in the late 1940s, the Outfit moved into slot and vending machines, counterfeiting cigarette and liquor tax stamps, and expanding narcotics smuggling. Accardo placed slot machines in gas stations, restaurants and bars throughout the Outfit's territory. Outside of Chicago, the Outfit expanded into Las Vegas and took influence over the city's gaming industry away from the Five Families of New York City. Accardo ensured all the legal Las Vegas casinos used his slot machines. In Kansas and Oklahoma, Accardo also took advantage of the official ban on alcohol sales to introduce bootlegged alcohol. The Outfit eventually dominated organized crime in most of the western United States. Accardo phased out some traditional activities, such as labor racketeering and extortion, to reduce the Outfit's exposure to legal prosecution. He also converted the Outfit's brothel business into call girl services. These changes resulted in a golden era of profitability and influence for the Outfit.

Accardo and Ricca emphasized keeping a low profile and let flashier figures, such as Sam Giancana, attract attention instead. For example, when professional wrestlers Lou Albano and Tony Altomare, wrestling as a Mafia-inspired tag team called "The Sicilians," came to Chicago in 1961, Accardo persuaded the men to drop the gimmick to avoid any mob-related publicity. By using tactics such as these, Accardo and Ricca were able to run the Outfit much longer than Capone. Ricca once said, "Accardo had more brains for breakfast than Capone had in a lifetime."

=== Change of leadership ===
After 1957, Accardo turned down the official position as boss because of "heat" from the Internal Revenue Service (IRS). Accardo became the Outfit's consigliere, stepping away from the day-to-day running of the organization, but still retained considerable power and demanded ultimate respect. Despite officially being boss, Giancana still had to obtain the sanction of Accardo and Ricca on major business, including murders.

However, this working relationship eventually broke down. Unlike Accardo, the widowed Giancana lived an ostentatious lifestyle, frequenting posh nightclubs and dating high-profile singer Phyllis McGuire. He also refused to distribute some of the lavish profits from the Outfit's casinos in Iran and Central America to the rank-and-file members. Many in the Outfit felt that Giancana was attracting too much attention from the FBI, which frequently tailed his car around the Chicago metropolitan area. Around 1966, after Giancana began a year in jail on federal contempt of court charges, Accardo and Ricca replaced him with Aiuppa. In June 1975, after spending most of his Outfit exile years in Mexico and unceremoniously being booted from that country, Giancana was murdered in the basement apartment of his home in Oak Park, Illinois, while cooking Italian sausages and escarole.

Ricca died in 1972, leaving Accardo as the ultimate authority in the Outfit.

=== Home burglary ===
In 1978, while Accardo vacationed in California, burglars entered his River Forest home. Shortly afterward, the three suspected thieves and four related persons were found strangled and with their throats cut. Law enforcement officials believed Accardo had ordered the killings in retaliation for the burglary. In 2002, this theory was confirmed on the witness stand by Outfit mobster turned informer Nicholas Calabrese, who had participated in the murders. The surviving assassins were all convicted in the Family Secrets trial and sentenced to long prison terms.

== Personal life ==
In 1934, Accardo met Clarice Pordzany, a Polish-American chorus girl. They later married and had two daughters, and adopted two sons.

For most of his married life, Accardo lived in River Forest, Illinois. The six-bedroom, six-bath home he owned on Franklin Avenue contained two bowling lanes, an indoor swimming pool and a pipe organ. When he started receiving attention from the IRS about his lifestyle, he bought a ranch house on the 1400 block of North Ashland Avenue and installed a vault. His neighbor and friend, physician Jim Carto, lived across the street off Ashland Ave in the Mars Candy Mansion and was rumored to have assisted in providing medical care under the table. Due to their similar-sounding last names, Carto was often confused with Accardo and became respected as a member of the Accardo family. Carto and his wife Rose, a nurse, and Leon Kolanko, Rose's brother, were rumored to be Accardo's personal physicians, who may have helped assist in medical care "off the books." Accardo's official job was as a beer salesman for a Chicago brewery.

Several of Accardo's family members have had careers in the National Football League. His daughter Marie married Palmer Pyle, who played guard for the Baltimore Colts, Minnesota Vikings and Oakland Raiders. Their son Eric Kumerow played linebacker for the Miami Dolphins, and Eric's son Jake was a wide receiver for five teams, most notably the Buffalo Bills. Eric's sister, Cheryl, married John Bosa, who played defensive end for the Dolphins. They had two sons, Joey and Nick; Joey plays as a linebacker for the Buffalo Bills, and Nick as a defensive end for the San Francisco 49ers.

=== Death and burial ===
In the late 1970s, Accardo purchased a house in Palm Springs, California, flying to Chicago to preside over Outfit "sit-downs" and mediate disputes. By that time, his personal holdings included legal investments in commercial office buildings, retail centers, lumber farms, paper factories, hotels, car dealerships, trucking companies, newspaper companies, restaurants and travel agencies.

Accardo spent his last years in Barrington Hills, Illinois, living with his daughter and son-in-law. On May 22, 1992, Anthony Accardo died of respiratory and heart conditions aged 86. He is buried in a crypt in the mausoleum at Queen of Heaven Cemetery, in Hillside, Illinois. Despite an arrest record dating back to 1922, Accardo spent at most only one night in jail.

== In popular culture ==
- In the 1995 television movie Sugartime about Giancana and McGuire, Accardo is portrayed by Maury Chaykin.
- In the television series Vegas, Accardo is referred to as "Tuna" by mobster Vincent Savino (Michael Chiklis) when he is preparing the monthly casino skim to depart to Chicago.
- Mandy Patinkin plays Accardo in the movie November 1963 (2026).

== See also ==
- List of Havana Conference invitees

== Notes ==
American Mafia
Preceded by Louis Campagna	Chicago Outfit; Underboss; 1943–1947	Succeeded by Sam Giancana
Preceded by Paul Ricca	Chicago Outfit; Boss; 1947–1957	Succeeded by Sam Giancana
Preceded by Paul Ricca	Chicago Outfit; Consigliere; 1957–1992	Succeeded by Angelo LaPietra
