= Nick Bosa =

American football player (born 1997)

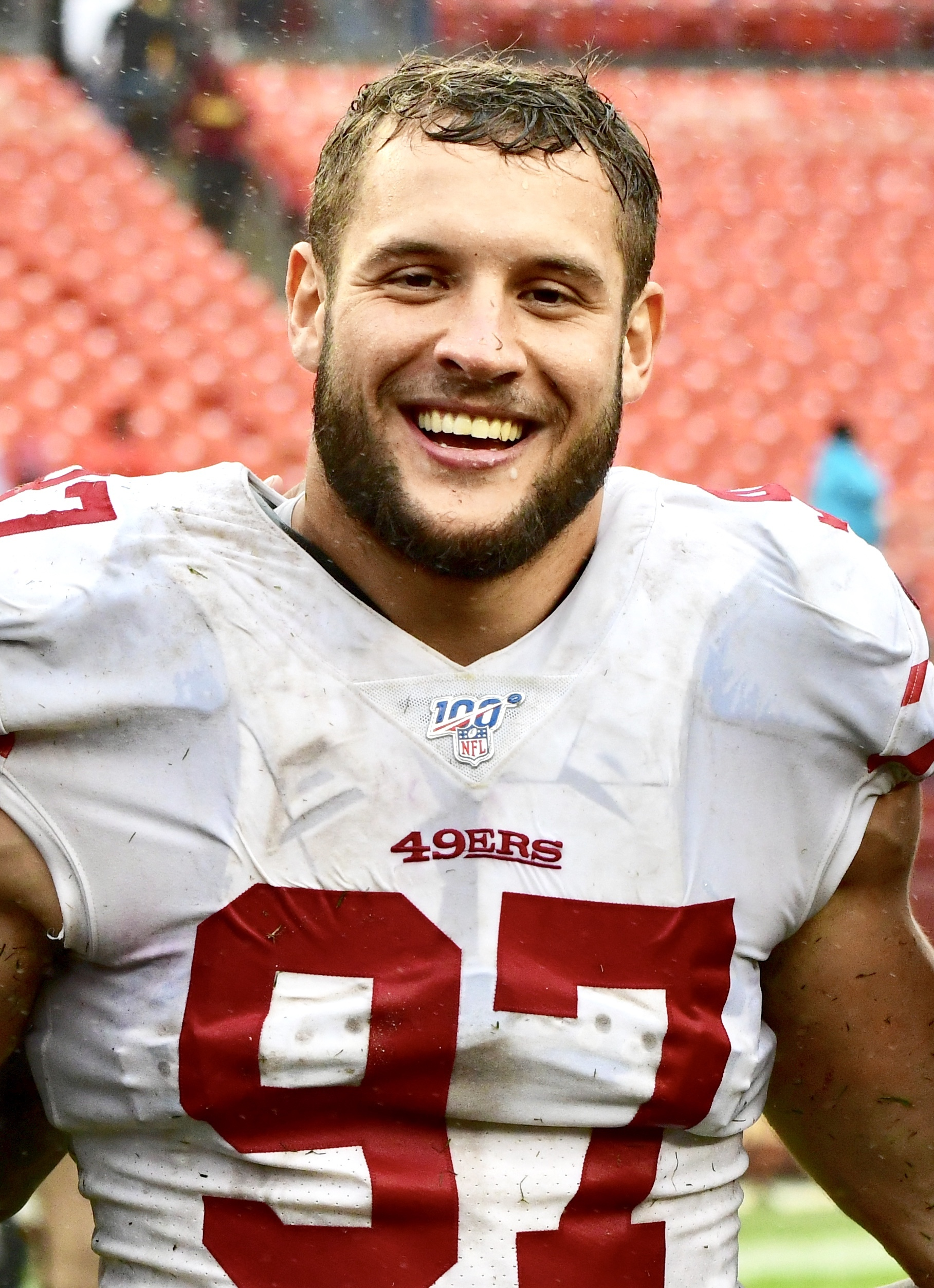
- Bosa with the San Francisco 49ers in 2019

No. 97 – San Francisco 49ers
- Position: Defensive end
- Roster status: Active

Personal information
- Born: October 23, 1997 (age 29); Fort Lauderdale, Florida, U.S.
- Listed height: 6 ft 4 in (1.93 m)
- Listed weight: 266 lb (121 kg)

Career information
- High school: St. Thomas Aquinas (Fort Lauderdale)
- College: Ohio State (2016–2018)
- NFL draft: 2019: 1st round, 2nd overall pick

Career history
- San Francisco 49ers (2019–present)

Awards and highlights
- NFL Defensive Player of the Year (2022); NFL Defensive Rookie of the Year (2019); First-team All-Pro (2022); 5× Pro Bowl (2019, 2021–2024); Deacon Jones Award (2022); PFWA All-Rookie Team (2019); First-team All-American (2017); Big Ten Defensive Lineman of the Year (2017); First-team All-Big Ten (2017)

Career NFL statistics as of Week 10, 2026
- Total tackles: 286
- Sacks: 64.5
- Forced fumbles: 13
- Fumble recoveries: 5
- Interceptions: 2
- Pass deflections: 9
- Stats at Pro Football Reference

Nicholas John Bosa (/ˈboʊsə/; born October 23, 1997) is an American professional football defensive end for the San Francisco 49ers of the National Football League (NFL). He played college football for the Ohio State Buckeyes and was selected second overall by the 49ers in the 2019 NFL draft. Bosa was named NFL Defensive Rookie of the Year and helped his team reach Super Bowl LIV. In 2022, he won the NFL Defensive Player of the Year award. He is the son of former NFL defensive end John Bosa and younger brother of current NFL defensive end Joey Bosa.

== Early life ==
Bosa attended St. Thomas Aquinas in Fort Lauderdale, Florida, where he was a four-year starter and a multi-year first-team all-state player. He was a five-star recruit and was ranked among the best players in his class. Bosa committed to Ohio State University to play college football.

== College career ==
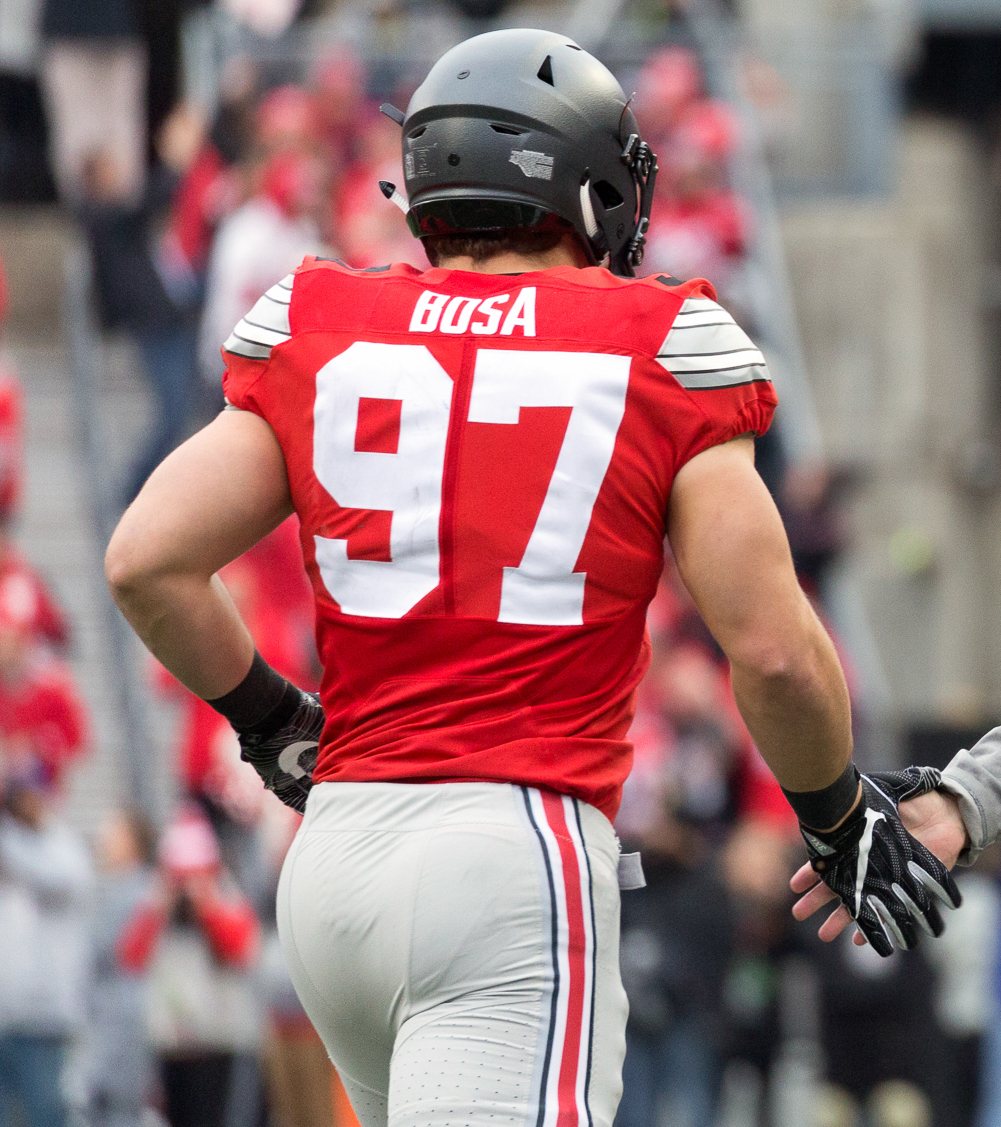
Bosa in 2016

Bosa played in all 13 games as a true freshman at Ohio State in 2016, recording 29 tackles, seven of which were for a loss, and five sacks. His season would come to a close in a loss to Clemson in the College Football Playoff.

As a sophomore, Bosa became the starting defensive end for the Buckeyes in seven games. He was named a unanimous first-team All-Big Ten Conference and the Smith-Brown Big Ten Defensive Lineman of the Year for his 32 total tackles (14.5 for a loss) and a team leading seven sacks. Bosa also had two pass breakups, eight quarterback hurries, and a blocked kick.

On September 1, 2018, against Oregon State, Bosa had two sacks and a one-yard fumble recovery for a touchdown in the 77–31 victory. On September 20, it was reported that Bosa underwent core muscle surgery, ruling him out indefinitely. On October 16, Bosa announced that he was withdrawing from Ohio State for the rest of the season. After the season, Bosa decided to forgo his senior year and enter the 2019 NFL draft.

== Professional career ==
=== Pre-draft ===
Coming out of Ohio State, Bosa was projected to be the first overall pick in the draft by a majority of analysts and scouts. Bosa received an invitation to the NFL Scouting Combine as one of the top prospects at the draft. He completed all of the required combine drills and positional drills except for the 10-yard and 20-yard split. Bosa met and interviewed with eight NFL teams at the combine, including the Arizona Cardinals, San Francisco 49ers, New York Jets, New York Giants, and Tampa Bay Buccaneers. A week before the draft, Bosa was criticized by some due to his political beliefs and controversial tweets, such as calling Colin Kaepernick a "clown", expressing support for U.S. president Donald Trump, and "liking" a post on Instagram that included racial and homophobic slurs as hashtags.

Pre-draft measurables
Height	Weight	Arm length	Hand span	Wingspan	40-yard dash	10-yard split	20-yard split	20-yard shuttle	Three-cone drill	Vertical jump	Broad jump	Bench press	Wonderlic
6 ft 3 3/4 in (1.92 m)	266 lb (121 kg)	33 in (0.84 m)	10 3/4 in (0.27 m)	6 ft 5 7/8 in (1.98 m)	4.79 s	1.62 s	2.76 s	4.14 s	7.10 s	33.5 in (0.85 m)	9 ft 8 in (2.95 m)	29 reps	23
All values are from NFL Scouting Combine

=== 2019 ===
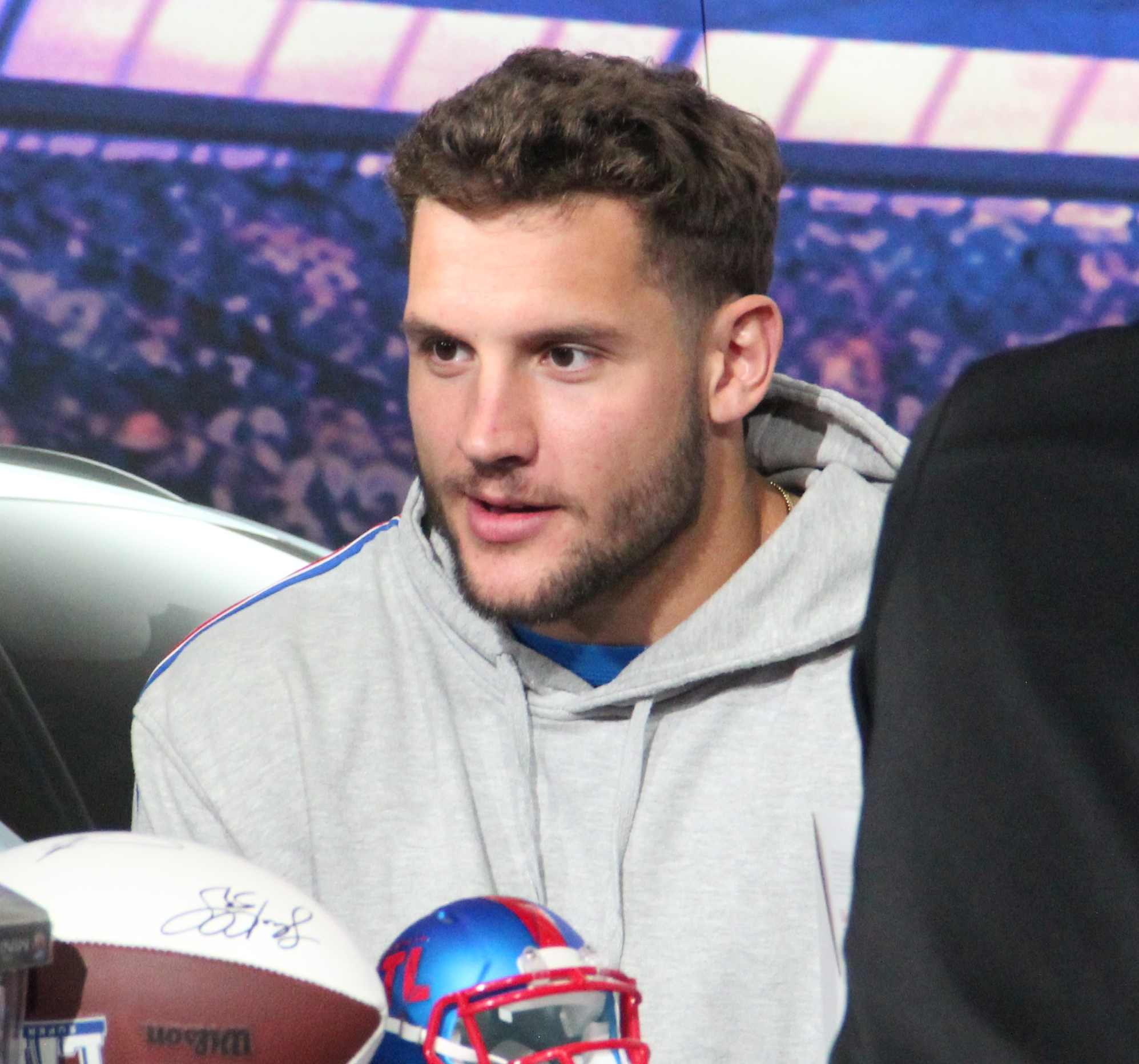
Bosa in 2019

Bosa was selected by the San Francisco 49ers in the first round with the second overall pick in the 2019 NFL draft. On July 25, 2019, Bosa signed a four-year deal with the 49ers worth $33.5 million featuring a $22.5 million signing bonus and a fifth-year option.

Bosa made his NFL debut in the season-opener against the Tampa Bay Buccaneers and made three tackles and a sack in the 31–17 road victory. During a Week 5 31–3 victory over the Cleveland Browns on Monday Night Football, Bosa recorded four tackles and sacked Baker Mayfield twice, one of which resulted in a fumble. Bosa was named NFC Defensive Player of the Week for his performance. Two weeks later against the Washington Redskins, Bosa had seven tackles and a sack in the 9–0 shoutout road victory. In the next game against the Carolina Panthers, Bosa sacked Kyle Allen thrice and recorded his first career interception along with four tackles and a pass deflection during the 51–13 victory. Bosa was named the NFC Defensive Player of the Week for his performance along with his brother Joey, who was voted AFC Defensive Player of the Week. The next day, Bosa was named the NFC Defensive Player of the Month for his play in October.

During a Week 10 27–24 overtime loss to the Seattle Seahawks on Monday Night Football, Bosa had a season-high eight combined tackles (three solo). Two weeks later against the Green Bay Packers on Sunday Night Football, he recorded three tackles, a sack, and a fumble recovery in the 37–8 victory. During Week 14 against the New Orleans Saints, Bosa had two tackles and a pass deflection in the narrow 48–46 road victory. In the next game against the Atlanta Falcons, he had three tackles and a sack during the 29–22 loss.

Bosa finished his rookie year with 47 combined tackles (32 solo), nine sacks, a forced fumble, two fumble recoveries, two pass deflections, and an interception in 16 games and 14 starts. He was named to the PFWA All-Rookie Team. The 49ers finished atop the NFC West with a 13–3 record and qualified for the playoffs as the #1-seed. In the Divisional Round against the Minnesota Vikings, Bosa recorded six tackles, a pass deflection, and sacked Kirk Cousins twice during the 27–10 victory. During the NFC Championship Game against the Green Bay Packers, Bosa had four tackles and sacked Aaron Rodgers once in the 37–20 victory as the 49ers advanced to Super Bowl LIV. At the NFL Honors, Bosa won the AP NFL Defensive Rookie of the Year Award, which his father accepted on his behalf due to Bosa being at the Super Bowl in Miami. In the Super Bowl against the Kansas City Chiefs, he recorded five tackles, a pass deflection, and a strip sack on Patrick Mahomes during the 31–20 loss. Bosa was ranked 17th by his fellow players on the NFL Top 100 Players of 2020.

=== 2020 ===
Bosa began the season recording six tackles and a forced fumble in the season-opening 24–20 loss to the Arizona Cardinals. However, in the next game against the New York Jets, Bosa left the eventual 31–13 road victory in the first quarter with a knee injury. It was later revealed that he tore his ACL, prematurely ending his season. Bosa was placed on injured reserve on September 23, 2020.

During his rehab, Bosa hired a private chef and took on a strict, protein-heavy diet as part of his recovery.

=== 2021 ===
Bosa returned from his injury in time for the season-opening 41–33 road victory over the Detroit Lions, finishing with four tackles (three for a loss) and a sack. In the next game against the Philadelphia Eagles, Bosa recorded three tackles and sacked Jalen Hurts during the 17–11 road victory. Two weeks later against the Seattle Seahawks, Bosa had three tackles and a sack in the 28–21 loss.

During Week 5 against the Cardinals, Bosa recorded five tackles and a sack in the 17–10 road loss. Three weeks later against the Chicago Bears, Bosa had three tackles and sacked Justin Fields twice. In the next game against the Cardinals, Bosa recorded four tackles and a forced fumble during the 31–17 loss. The following week against the Los Angeles Rams on Monday Night Football, he recorded a tackle, sack, and a pass deflection in the 31–10 victory.

During a Week 11 30–10 road victory over the Jacksonville Jaguars, Bosa recorded three tackles and sacked Trevor Lawrence twice. Bosa then recorded a sack in the next two games against the Vikings and Seahawks. During a Week 14 26–23 overtime road victory against the Cincinnati Bengals, he recorded three tackles and sacked Joe Burrow twice. In the next game against the Falcons, Bosa recorded a tackle and a strip-sack on Matt Ryan during the 31–13 victory. During the regular-season finale against the Rams, Bosa recorded five tackles and 0.5 sacks in the 27–24 overtime road victory.

Bosa finished the 2021 season with 52 combined tackles (40 solo), 15.5 sacks, four forced fumbles, and a pass deflection in 17 games and starts. His 21 tackles for loss led the league. The 49ers finished the season with a 10–7 record and earned the #7-seed in the playoffs. During the Wild Card Round against the Dallas Cowboys, Bosa had three tackles and 0.5 sacks in the 23–17 road victory. In the Divisional Round against the Packers, he recorded three tackles and sacked Aaron Rodgers twice during the 13–10 road victory. During the NFC Championship Game against the Rams, Bosa had six tackles and sacked Matthew Stafford 1.5 times in the 20–17 road loss.

=== 2022 ===
On April 25, 2022, the 49ers picked up the fifth-year option on Bosa's rookie contract.

During the season-opener against the Bears, Bosa had five tackles and a sack in the 19–10 road loss. In the next game against the Seahawks, he recorded four tackles and sacked Geno Smith twice during the 27–7 road victory. The following week against the Denver Broncos on Sunday Night Football, Bosa had two tackles and sacked Russell Wilson once in the narrow 11–10 road loss.

During Week 4 against the Rams on Monday Night Football, Bosa had three tackles and two sacks in the 24–9 victory. He missed the Week 6 matchup due to a groin injury he suffered in the previous game against the Panthers. Bosa returned in Week 7 against the Chiefs, recording four tackles and a sack during the 44–23 loss. The following week against the Rams, Bosa had four tackles and sacked Matthew Stafford 1.5 times in the 31–14 road victory.

Following a Week 9 bye, the 49ers returned home to face the Los Angeles Chargers on Sunday Night Football. Bosa finished the 22–16 victory with four tackles and a sack. In the next game against the Cardinals at Estadio Azteca in Mexico on Monday Night Football, Bosa recorded three tackles and a sack during the 38–10 victory. The following week against the Saints, he had three tackles and a sack in the 13–0 shutout road victory. Bosa was named NFC Defensive Player of the Month for the month of November after recording five tackles for a loss, three sacks, and 10 quarterback hits, with the 49ers going 3–0 during that span.

During Week 13 against the Miami Dolphins, Bosa recorded three tackles (two for a loss), a forced fumble, and sacked Tua Tagovailoa thrice in the 33–17 victory. Bosa was named NFC Defensive Player of the Week for his performance. Two weeks later against the Seahawks on Thursday Night Football, Bosa had two tackles, a pass deflection, and a sack in the 21–13 road victory. In the next game against the Washington Commanders, he recorded seven tackles, a forced fumble, and sacked Taylor Heinicke twice during the 37–20 victory. Bosa earned his second NFC Defensive Player of the Week award of the season for his performance. During the regular-season finale against the Cardinals, Bosa had two tackles and sacked David Blough once in the 38–13 victory.

Bosa finished the 2022 season with 51 combined tackles (41 solo), a league-leading 18.5 sacks, two forced fumbles, and a pass deflection in 16 games and starts. He was named as a Pro Bowler for the third time. Bosa was also named as first team All-Pro for the first time. The 49ers finished atop the NFC West with a 13–4 record and qualified for the playoffs as the #2-seed. During the Wild Card Round against the Seahawks, Bosa had five tackles and a fumble recovery in the 41–23 victory. In the Divisional Round against the Cowboys, he recorded two tackles during the 19–12 victory. During the NFC Championship Game against the Eagles, Bosa had four tackles in the 31–7 road loss. At the end of the season, Bosa was named NFL Defensive Player of the Year and The Sporting News Defensive Player of the Year. He was ranked fourth by his fellow players on the NFL Top 100 Players of 2023.

=== 2023 ===
On September 6, 2023, after holding out on a deal with the 49ers for 44 days, Bosa signed a five-year, $170 million contract extension with $122.5 million guaranteed, making him the highest-paid defensive player in NFL history.

During a Week 3 30–12 over the New York Giants on Thursday Night Football, Bosa recorded three tackles and his first sack of the season on Daniel Jones. Two weeks later against the Cowboys on Sunday Night Football, Bosa had four tackles and 0.5 sacks in the 42–10 victory. In the next game against the Browns, he recorded three tackles, a sack, and a pass deflection during the narrow 19–17 road loss.

During Week 8 against the Bengals, Bosa had two tackles and 0.5 sacks in the 31–17 loss. Following a Week 9 bye, the 49ers went on the road to face the Jaguars. Bosa finished the 34–3 victory with 1.5 sacks, three tackles, six pressures, a pass breakup, a forced fumble, and a fumble recovery. He was named NFC Defensive Player of the Week for his performance. In the next game against the Buccaneers, Bosa had three tackles and 1.5 sacks during the 27–14 victory. The following week against the Seahawks on Thanksgiving, he recorded five tackles and two sacks in the 31–13 victory.

During Week 14 against the Seahawks, Bosa had six tackles, 1.5 sacks, and a pass deflection in the 28–16 victory. In the next game against the Cardinals, he recorded a tackle and strip-sacked Kyler Murray once during the 45–29 road victory. Two weeks later against the Commanders, Bosa had three tackles and a pass deflection in the 27–10 road victory.

Bosa finished the 2023 season with 53 combined tackles (34 solo), 10.5 sacks, four pass deflections, and two forced fumbles in 17 games and starts. He earned Pro Bowl honors for the fourth time. The 49ers finished atop the NFC West with a 12–5 record and qualified for the playoffs as the #1-seed. In the Divisional Round against the Packers, Bosa recorded three tackles during the 24–21 victory. During the NFC Championship Game against the Lions, Bosa had three tackles and sacked Jared Goff twice in the 34–31 comeback victory as the 49ers advanced to Super Bowl LVIII. In the Super Bowl against the Chiefs, Bosa recorded six tackles and three quarterback hits during the 25–22 overtime loss. He was ranked 27th by his fellow players on the NFL Top 100 Players of 2024.

=== 2024 ===
During Week 2 against the Vikings, Bosa had five tackles and sacked Sam Darnold twice in the 23–17 road loss. Two weeks later against the New England Patriots, Bosa recorded five tackles and a fumble recovery after strip-sacking Jacoby Brissett in the 30–13 victory. In the next game against the Cardinals, Bosa had four tackles, an interception, and a pass deflection during the narrow 24–23 loss.

During Week 7 against the Chiefs, Bosa had three tackles and 0.5 sacks in the 28–18 loss. In the next game against the Cowboys on Sunday Night Football, he recorded three tackles and sacked Dak Prescott once during the 30–24 victory. Following the game, Bosa was seen wearing a white Make America Great Again hat with yellow text in support of Donald Trump at a postgame interview. Bosa said, "I think it's an important time", for why he wore the hat. The NFL fined Bosa $11,255 after the game for wearing gear with non-sponsored branding, in accordance with the league rules. Bosa said that "it was worth it" with regard to being fined.

Following a Week 9 bye, the 49ers went on the road to face the Buccaneers. Bosa finished the 23–20 victory with four tackles and a sack. In the next game against the Seahawks, Bosa entered the game with a hip injury, but recorded four tackles and 1.5 sacks before leaving the eventual 20–17 loss during the third quarter with an oblique injury. He missed the next two games as a result.

Bosa returned from injury in Week 14 against the Rams on Thursday Night Football and finished the 12–6 loss with four tackles. Two weeks later against the Lions on Monday Night Football, he had a season-high eight combined tackles (five solo) and sacked Jared Goff twice in the 40–34 loss.

Bosa finished the 2024 season with 52 combined tackles (33 solo), nine sacks, an interception, a pass deflection, a forced fumble, and a fumble recovery in 14 games and starts. He earned Pro Bowl honors for the fifth time. Bosa was ranked 57th by his fellow players on the NFL Top 100 Players of 2025.

=== 2025 ===
During the season-opening 17–13 road victory over the Seahawks, Bosa recorded six tackles and a fumble recovery after making the game-winning strip-sack. In the next game against the Saints, he had nine tackles and sacked Spencer Rattler once during the 26–21 road victory. The following week against the Cardinals, Bosa had two tackles and a forced fumble before leaving the eventual narrow 16–15 victory in the first quarter with a knee injury. It was later revealed that he tore his ACL, prematurely ending his season. Bosa was placed on injured reserve on September 25, 2025.

Bosa finished the 2025 season with 17 combined tackles (nine solo), two sacks, two forced fumbles, and a fumble recovery in three games and starts.

== Career statistics ==
Legend
	NFL Defensive Player of the Year
	Led the league
**Bold**	Career high

=== NFL ===
==== Regular season ====
Year	Team	Games		Tackles					Interceptions					Fumbles			
Year	Team	GP	GS	Cmb	Solo	Ast	TfL	Sck	Int	Yds	Lng	TD	PD	FF	FR	Yds	TD
2019	SF	16	14	47	32	15	16	9.0	**1**	**46**	**46**	0	2	1	**2**	**6**	0
2020	SF	2	2	6	3	3	0	0.0	0	0	0	0	0	1	0	0	0
2021	SF	17	17	52	40	12	**21**	15.5	0	0	0	0	1	**4**	0	0	0
2022	SF	16	16	51	**41**	10	19	**18.5**	0	0	0	0	1	2	0	0	0
2023	SF	17	17	**53**	34	**19**	16	10.5	0	0	0	0	**4**	2	1	-3	0
2024	SF	14	14	52	33	**19**	15	9.0	**1**	30	30	0	1	1	1	0	0
2025	SF	3	3	17	9	8	4	2.0	0	0	0	0	0	2	1	0	0
2026	SF	4	4	8	4	4	3	0.0	0	0	0	0	0	0	0	0	0
Career		89	87	286	196	90	94	64.5	2	76	46	0	9	13	5	3	0

==== Postseason ====
Year	Team	Games		Tackles					Interceptions					Fumbles			
Year	Team	GP	GS	Cmb	Solo	Ast	TfL	Sck	Int	Yds	Lng	TD	PD	FF	FR	Yds	TD
2019	SF	3	3	**15**	**11**	**4**	3	**4.0**	0	0	0	0	**2**	**1**	0	0	0
2021	SF	3	3	12	8	**4**	2	**4.0**	0	0	0	0	0	**1**	0	0	0
2022	SF	3	3	11	8	3	**4**	0.0	0	0	0	0	0	0	**1**	0	0
2023	SF	3	3	12	9	3	**4**	2.0	0	0	0	0	0	0	0	0	0
2025	SF	0	0	Did not play due to injury													
Career		12	12	50	36	14	13	10.0	0	0	0	0	2	2	1	0	0

=== College ===
College statistics
Season	GP	Tackles					Interceptions					Fumbles			
Season	GP	Solo	Ast	Cmb	TfL	Sck	Int	Yds	Avg	TD	PD	FF	FR	Yds	TD
2016	12	17	12	29	7	5.0	0	0	0	0	0	0	0	0	0
2017	14	**19**	**15**	**34**	**16**	**8.5**	0	0	0	0	**2**	**1**	0	0	0
2018	3	11	3	14	6	4.0	0	0	0	0	0	**1**	0	0	**1**
Career	29	47	30	77	29	17.5	0	0	0	0	2	2	0	0	1

== Personal life ==
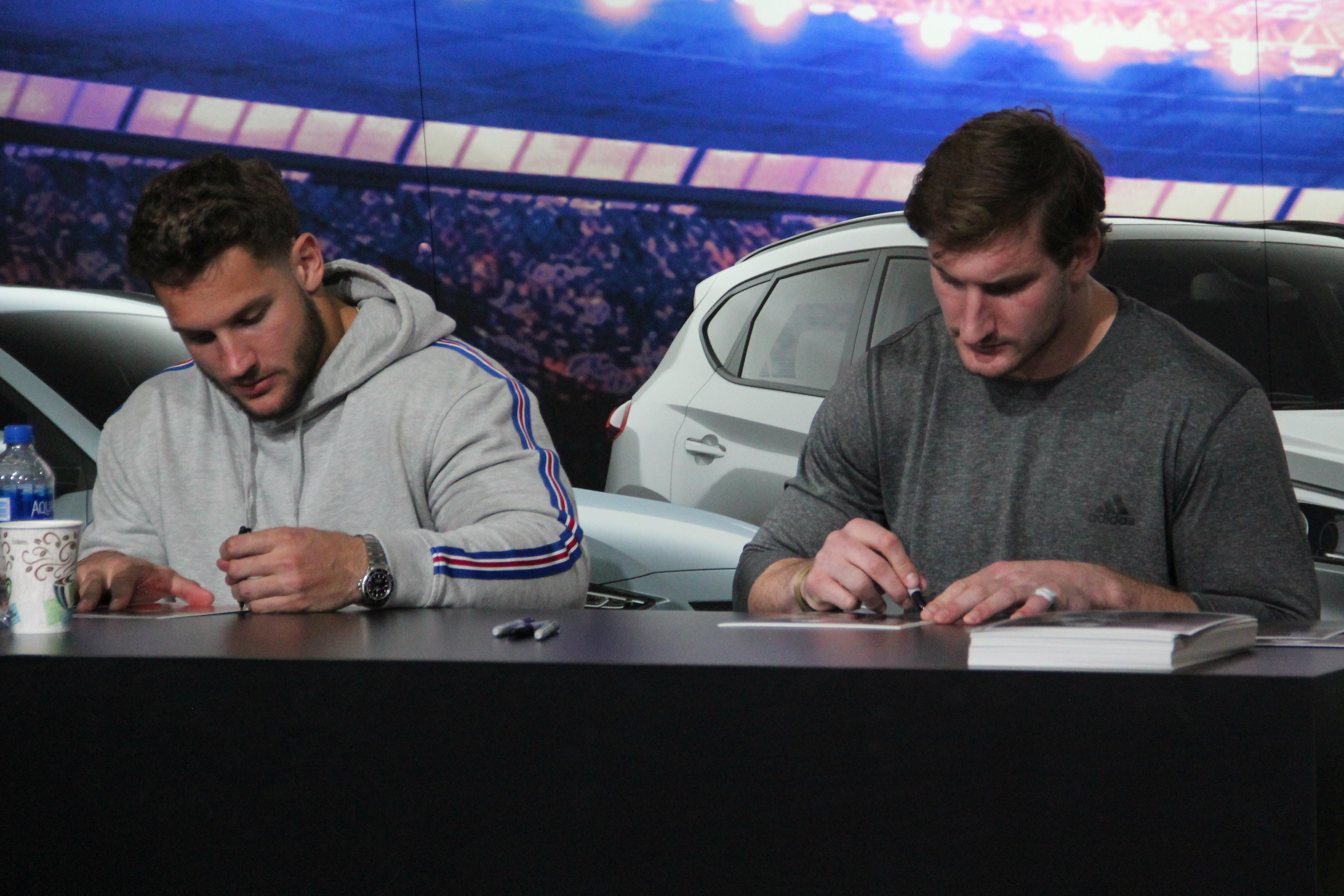
Nick (left) with his brother Joey in 2019

Bosa's brother, Joey, also played college football at Ohio State before being selected third overall by the San Diego Chargers in the 2016 NFL draft. Their father, John, was a first round pick by the Miami Dolphins in the 1987 NFL draft out of Boston College. Bosa's uncle Eric Kumerow (also a first round pick by the Miami Dolphins in the 1988 NFL draft), cousin Jake Kumerow, grandfather Palmer Pyle, and great-uncle Mike Pyle, have also played in the NFL. Bosa is the great-grandson of former Chicago Outfit leader Tony Accardo.

During the 2024 season, after a 30–24 win over the Dallas Cowboys on Sunday Night Football, Bosa was seen wearing a white Make America Great Again hat with yellow text in support of Donald Trump at a postgame interview. Bosa said "I think it's an important time" for why he wore the hat. The NFL fined Bosa $11,255 after the game for wearing gear with non-sponsored branding, in accordance with the league rules. Bosa said "it was worth it" with regard to being fined. In July 2025, Bosa joined President Trump's re-established Council on Sports, Fitness, and Nutrition.

=== Social media posts ===
Leading up to the 2019 NFL draft, in which Bosa was the second overall player selected, Bosa gained media attention for his posts, shares, retweets, and likes on Twitter and Instagram. In response, Bosa deleted them, which he discussed at the time in at least one interview with ESPN and one interview with USA Today. His posts criticized Beyoncé and the film Black Panther, for example, as well as supporting then-President Donald Trump. His controversial posts also included him calling former San Francisco 49ers quarterback Colin Kaepernick a "clown", perhaps for his behavior surrounding his protests against police brutality and racial inequality in the US, which he noted he "had to" delete because "there is a chance I might end up in San Francisco." After being drafted by the 49ers, Bosa apologized for the posts in a press conference.

== See also ==
- List of second-generation National Football League players
