= Eric Kumerow =

American football player (born 1965)

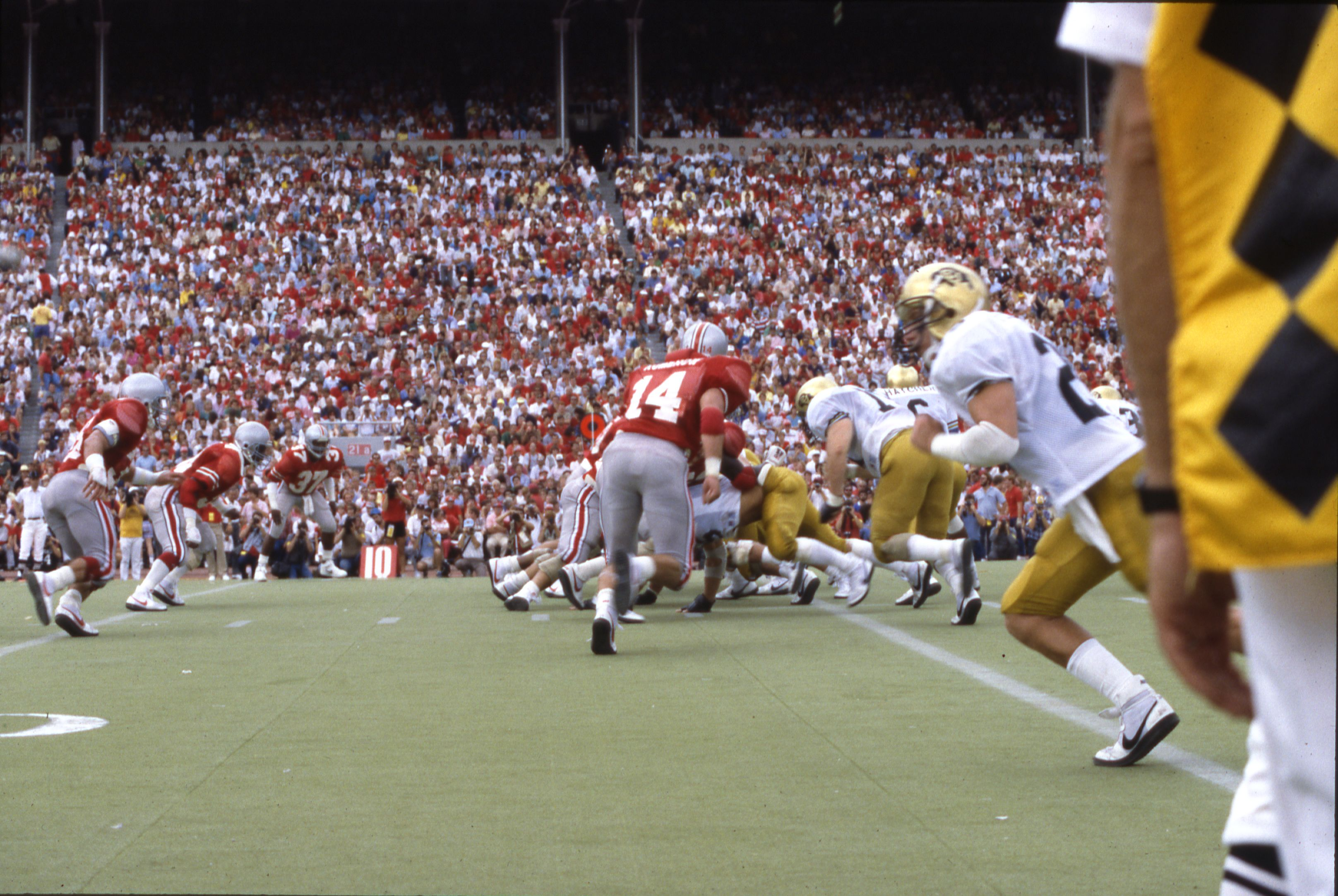
- Kumerow (#14) playing for the Ohio State Buckeyes in 1986

No. 90, 70
- Positions: Linebacker, defensive end

Personal information
- Born: April 17, 1965 (age 61); Chicago, Illinois, U.S.
- Listed height: 6 ft 7 in (2.01 m)
- Listed weight: 264 lb (120 kg)

Career information
- High school: Oak Park and River Forest (Oak Park, Illinois)
- College: Ohio State
- NFL draft: 1988: 1st round, 16th overall pick

Career history
- Miami Dolphins (1988–1990); Chicago Bears (1991)

Awards and highlights
- Big Ten Defensive Lineman of the Year (1986); 2× First-team All-Big Ten (1986, 1987); Second-team All-Big Ten (1985)

Career NFL statistics
- Sacks: 5
- Interceptions: 1
- Stats at Pro Football Reference

Eric Palmer Kumerow (né Pyle; born April 17, 1965) is an American former professional football player who was a linebacker for three seasons in the National Football League (NFL). He played college football for the Ohio State Buckeyes, and was selected in the first round of the 1988 NFL draft by the Miami Dolphins. He did not perform as well as expected and was considered to be a draft bust. After three seasons with the Dolphins, Kumerow signed with the Chicago Bears, but tore his Achilles tendon before his fourth season started and subsequently retired.

== Early life ==
Eric Kumerow was born on April 17, 1965, in Chicago. His parents were NFL star Palmer Pyle and Marie Accardo, daughter of Chicago Outfit boss Tony Accardo. After their divorce, Marie married Ernest Kumerow, a minor league baseball player and later official of the Laborers' International Union of North America, whose surname Eric and his sister, Cheryl, took.

At Oak Park and River Forest High School, Kumerow played quarterback and defensive back, and was named a 1982 USA Today High School All-American for the defensive back position. He won numerous other awards in football and basketball, receiving The Tribune Athlete of the Month Award in December 1982, and being added to The Tribune All-State, the Associated Press and the United Press International All-State teams during the football season of 1982. In addition to football, Kumerow was a standout basketball player. His basketball coach, Bob Parker, said, "Eric's the best athlete I've ever coached."

== College career ==
Kumerow played college football for the Ohio State Buckeyes. He started his career as a quarterback, which he played in high school, but switched to defense after spending his first season "on the bench." When Kumerow went to Ohio State, he focused more on football and did not play basketball. In college, he played linebacker, and was named Big Ten Defensive Lineman of the year in 1986. Kumerow played alongside future pro bowl linebacker Chris Spielman while at Ohio State. In 1986, when he won Defensive Lineman of the Year honors, he had 66 tackles (nine for a total loss of 62 yards), had an interception, and six passes defended. Kumerow's best game of the season came against the Iowa Hawkeyes, in which he had eight tackles, a sack, and a pass defended to earn Associated Press Lineman of the Week honors. He was named team captain in 1987 and was named First-team All Big Ten. Kumerow finished his college career with 23 sacks, which ranks sixth among all Ohio State players. He was 6-7 and 250 pounds during his college career. He was also an Honorable Mention All-American in his senior year.

== Professional career ==
Pre-draft measurables
Height	Weight	Hand span
6 ft 7 in (2.01 m)	257 lb (117 kg)	9 3/4 in (0.25 m)
All values from NFL Combine

In the 1988 NFL draft, Kumerow was selected in the first round by the Miami Dolphins with the 16th overall pick. It was one year after they drafted his brother-in-law John Bosa with the same pick. His drafting received negative response from Dolphins fans because he was predicted to be drafted much later in the draft. According to some sources, the pick even surprised Kumerow.

=== Miami Dolphins ===
Kumerow was switched from linebacker to defensive end in his second week of training camp. His first game was played against the Chicago Bears, a team he would later play for. In his first season, Kumerow played 14 games, had 13 tackles and three sacks. He played 12 games in 1989 and all 16 in 1990. Kumerow had two sacks in 1989 but none in 1990. He had his only career interception in 1990, which he returned for five yards. Kumerow did not start in any games in a Dolphins uniform.

=== Chicago Bears ===
In 1991, Kumerow was signed by the Chicago Bears, who originally wanted to draft him. He later tore his Achilles tendon and retired afterwards. Kumerow finished his career with 42 games played and five sacks.

== Personal life ==
Kumerow is married to his wife Tammi, with whom he has four children, including his son Jake. Other NFL players related to Kumerow are his uncle Mike Pyle, his brother-in-law John Bosa, and Bosa's sons, Joey and Nick Bosa.

As of 2018, Kumerow lived in the Chicago suburb of Bartlett, Illinois.
