= Joey Bosa =

American football player (born 1995)

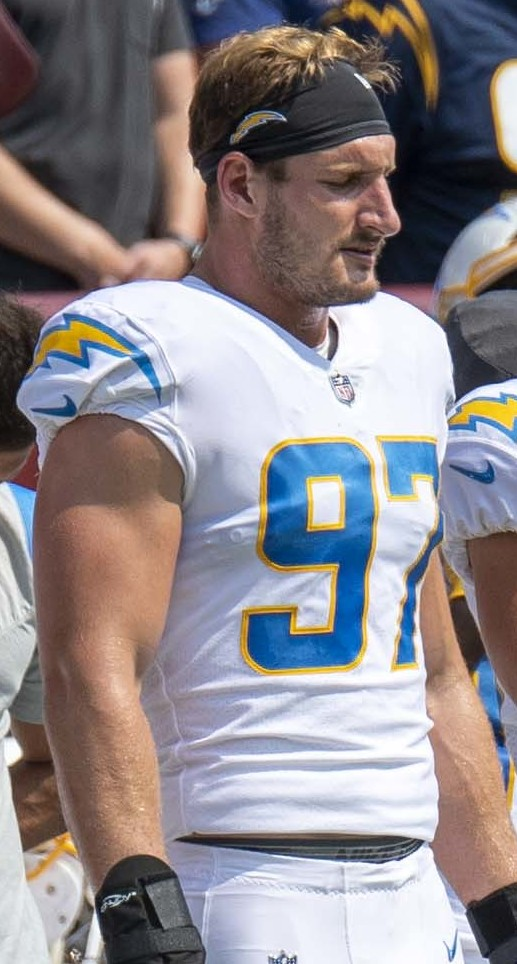
- Bosa with the Los Angeles Chargers in 2021

Profile
- Position: Defensive end

Personal information
- Born: July 11, 1995 (age 31); Fort Lauderdale, Florida, U.S.
- Listed height: 6 ft 5 in (1.96 m)
- Listed weight: 280 lb (127 kg)

Career information
- High school: St. Thomas Aquinas (Fort Lauderdale)
- College: Ohio State (2013–2015)
- NFL draft: 2016: 1st round, 3rd overall pick

Career history
- San Diego / Los Angeles Chargers (2016–2024); Buffalo Bills (2025)

Awards and highlights
- NFL Defensive Rookie of the Year (2016); 5× Pro Bowl (2017, 2019–2021, 2024); NFL forced fumbles leader (2025); PFWA All-Rookie Team (2016); CFP national champion (2014); Bill Willis Trophy (2014); Unanimous All-American (2014); Consensus All-American (2015); Big Ten Defensive Player of the Year (2014); 2× Big Ten Defensive Lineman of the Year (2014, 2015); 2× First-team All-Big Ten (2014, 2015)

Career NFL statistics as of 2025
- Total tackles: 372
- Sacks: 77.0
- Forced fumbles: 22
- Fumble recoveries: 4
- Pass deflections: 5
- Stats at Pro Football Reference

Joseph Anthony Bosa (/ˈboʊsə/; born July 11, 1995) is an American professional football defensive end. He played college football for the Ohio State Buckeyes and was selected third overall by the then San Diego Chargers in the 2016 NFL draft, where he was named NFL Defensive Rookie of the Year. He is the son of former NFL player John Bosa and the older brother of current NFL player Nick Bosa.

== Early life ==
Bosa attended St. Thomas Aquinas High School in Fort Lauderdale, Florida, where he played high school football and basketball for the Raiders. He was rated by Rivals.com as a four-star recruit and was ranked as the fourth best defensive end in his class. Bosa committed to play college football at Ohio State University in April 2012.

== College career ==
As a true freshman in 2013, Bosa started 10 of 14 games, recording 44 tackles and 7.5 sacks. He was named a Freshman All-American by the Sporting News and College Football News. In 2014, Bosa was named a unanimous All-American, becoming the 27th Buckeye in 84 years to do so. He finished his sophomore year with 13.5 sacks on 55 tackles. He earned Big Ten Conference Defensive Player of the Year.

On July 30, 2015, it was announced that Bosa would be suspended from the first game of the 2015 season with three other Ohio State football players for undisclosed reasons. During his junior year, Bosa finished with five sacks and an interception on 47 tackles. On December 31, 2015, he announced his intentions to enter the 2016 NFL draft. During the 2016 Fiesta Bowl against Notre Dame on January 1, 2016, Bosa was ejected in the first quarter for a targeting penalty when he made a hit on quarterback DeShone Kizer. Ohio State won the Bowl game by a score of 44–28. After his junior season, he entered the 2016 NFL draft.

Bosa was a highly decorated Buckeye receiving National and Conference honors beginning his freshman year. In 2013, Bosa was named a first-team Freshman All-American as well as selected to the Freshman All-Big Ten first-team. In 2014, his sophomore year, he was named Big Ten Defensive Player of the Year, Big Ten Lineman of the Year, First-team All-American, and All-Big Ten, as well as a Lombardi Award finalist. He repeated most of the honors his Junior year, falling short of claiming the Nagurski-Woodson Defensive Player of the Year for the second time.

== Professional career ==
=== Pre-draft ===
In March 2016, Bosa was projected to be a top 10 pick in the 2016 NFL draft by NFL analyst Daniel Jeremiah. Bosa received an invitation to the NFL Combine as a top prospect in the upcoming draft. He completed all of the required combine drills and also participated in positional drills. Bosa met and interviewed with 13 NFL teams at the combine, including the Baltimore Ravens, New Orleans Saints, Dallas Cowboys, Cleveland Browns, and Tennessee Titans. His overall performance at the combine was thought by scouts to be impressive.

Pre-draft measurables
| Height | Weight | Arm length | Hand span | Wingspan | 40-yard dash | 10-yard split | 20-yard split | 20-yard shuttle | Three-cone drill | Vertical jump | Broad jump | Bench press | Wonderlic |
|---|---|---|---|---|---|---|---|---|---|---|---|---|---|
| 6 ft 5 1/4 in (1.96 m) | 269 lb (122 kg) | 33 3/8 in (0.85 m) | 10 1/4 in (0.26 m) | 6 ft 7 3/4 in (2.03 m) | 4.77 s | 1.65 s | 2.75 s | 4.21 s | 6.89 s | 32 in (0.81 m) | 10 ft 1 in (3.07 m) | 28 reps | 37 |
All values from NFL Combine/Pro Day

=== San Diego / Los Angeles Chargers ===
==== 2016 ====
Bosa was selected in the first round with the third overall selection by the San Diego Chargers. He was the first of five Ohio State players to be drafted in the first round of the 2016 NFL draft, followed by Ezekiel Elliott, Eli Apple, Taylor Decker, and Darron Lee.

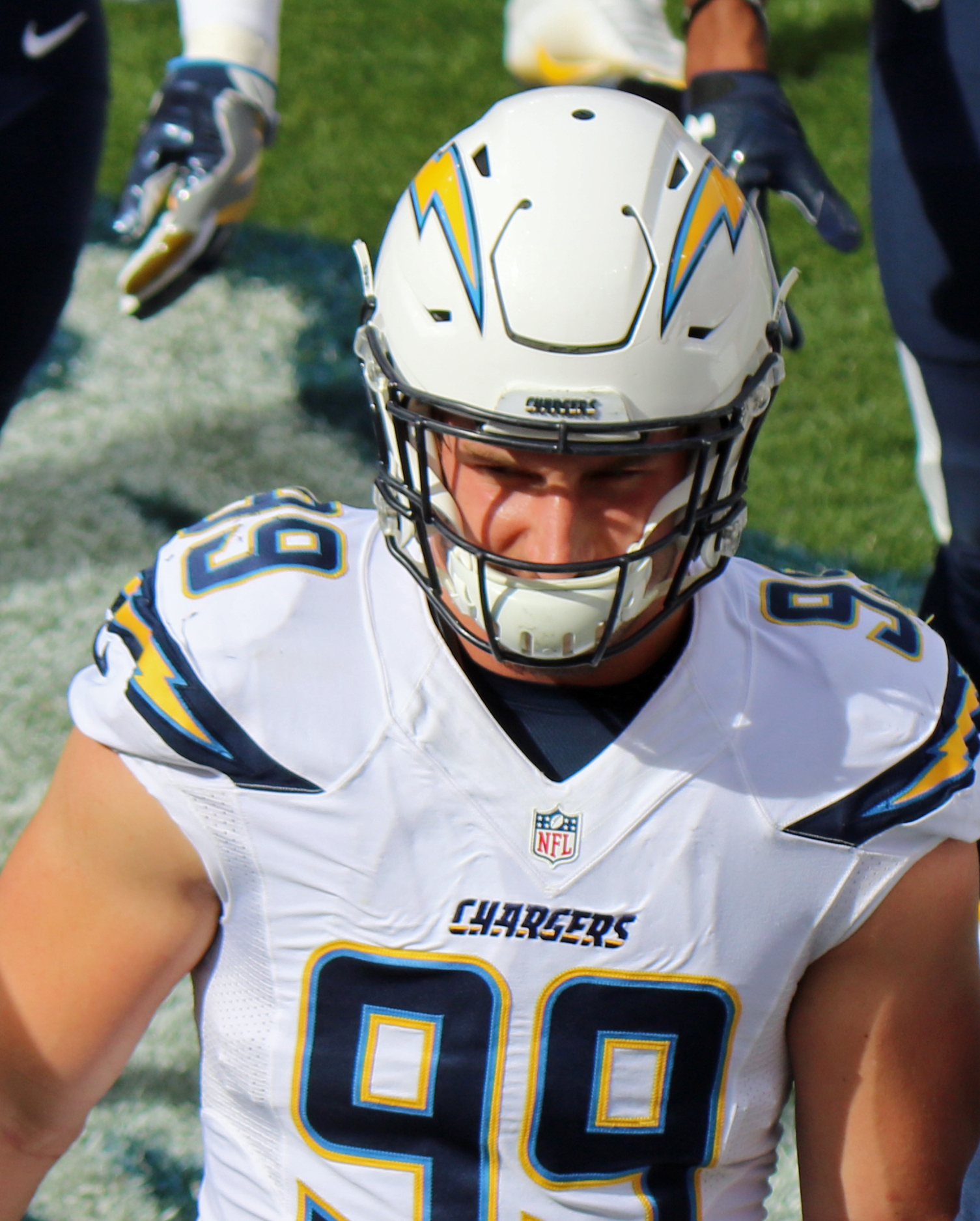
Bosa in 2016

Bosa missed the first four weeks of the season due to a hamstring injury. On October 9, Bosa made his regular season debut against AFC West rival Oakland Raiders. Although Bosa only played 27 snaps, he finished the game with two sacks, a hit, and four hurries. The following game against the Denver Broncos, he had one quarterback hit, five hurries, and a stop while also drawing double teams throughout the game. Bosa was named Defensive Rookie of the Month for October. Despite being limited to 12 games, Bosa finished his rookie year with 41 tackles, 10.5 sacks, and a forced fumble. He was named the NFL Defensive Rookie of the Year. He was named to the NFL All-Rookie Team. He was ranked as the 100th best player in the league by his peers on the NFL Top 100 Players of 2017.

==== 2017 ====
Bosa followed his impressive rookie season with a solid second season, which began with the Chargers' move from San Diego to Los Angeles. He and Melvin Ingram formed one of the best pass rushing duos in the league, with Bosa totaling 70 tackles and 12.5 sacks - seventh in the NFL. On December 19, 2017, Bosa was named to his first Pro Bowl. He was ranked #37 by his fellow players on the NFL Top 100 Players of 2018.

==== 2018 ====
Bosa suffered a foot injury, which sidelined him until Week 11 of the 2018 season. In seven games, he recorded 5.5 sacks, 23 combined tackles, nine quarterback hits, and one fumble recovery. He made his playoff debut in the Wild Card Round against the Ravens. In the 23–17 win, he had one sack, two tackles, and one quarterback hit. In the Divisional Round against the New England Patriots, he had one tackle in the 41–28 loss. He was ranked 56th by his fellow players on the NFL Top 100 Players of 2019.

==== 2019 ====
On April 12, 2019, Bosa switched his jersey number from 99 to 97. He wore 97 during his tenure with Ohio State. On April 23, 2019, the Chargers picked up the fifth-year option on Bosa's contract. In Week 7 against the Titans, Bosa sacked Ryan Tannehill twice in the 23–20 loss. In Week 8 against the Chicago Bears, Bosa recorded another two sacks on Mitch Trubisky in the 17–16 win. He was named the AFC Defensive Player of the Week for his performance while his brother, Nick Bosa, won the award for the NFC. In Week 14 against the Jacksonville Jaguars, Bosa sacked rookie quarterback Gardner Minshew twice in the 45–10 blowout win. Bosa made the Pro Bowl after accumulating 11.5 sacks and 67 tackles in total for the 2019 season. He was ranked 34th by his fellow players on the NFL Top 100 Players of 2020.

==== 2020 ====
On July 28, 2020, Bosa signed a five-year, $135 million contract extension with the Chargers, making him the highest-paid defensive player in the league. In Week 12 against the Buffalo Bills, Bosa recorded three sacks on Josh Allen and recovered a fumble lost by Allen during the 27–17 loss. He earned his third Pro Bowl nomination. He was ranked 32nd by his fellow players on the NFL Top 100 Players of 2021.

==== 2021 ====
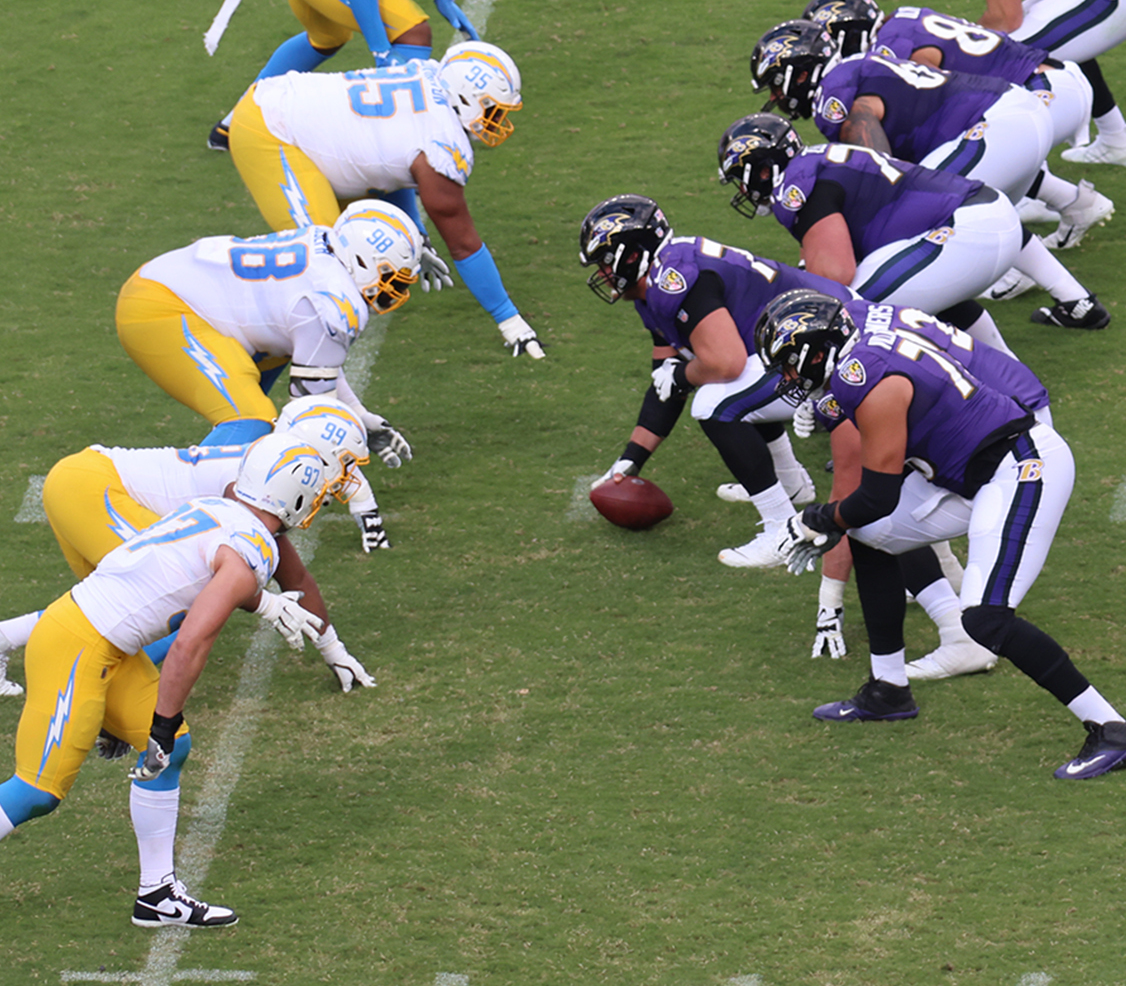
Bosa (#97) playing against the Baltimore Ravens in 2021

The 2021 season saw Bosa record a career-high 7 forced fumbles. Bosa's best single game for solo tackles in the 2021 season was the October 17, 2021, loss to the Ravens. Bosa made 5 solo tackles in the Chargers loss to the Ravens.

Bosa earned his fourth trip to the Pro Bowl but did not play after pulling out of the game with an undisclosed injury. Hall of Fame linebacker Junior Seau and Bosa are the only Chargers defensive players selected to four Pro Bowls over the first five seasons of a career. He was ranked 30th by his fellow players on the NFL Top 100 Players of 2022 list.

==== 2022 ====
During Week 3 against the Jaguars, Bosa left the game with a groin injury. It was later revealed that he needed surgery to repair the core muscle area of the groin. He was placed on injured reserve on September 28, 2022. He was designated to return from injured reserve on December 29, 2022. He was activated from injured reserve two days later. In the 2022 season, he finished with 2.5 sacks in five games. Against the same team in the Wild Card Round, Bosa committed a costly penalty by removing his helmet on the field in frustration after a late Jaguars touchdown. Trailing by four points, Jacksonville subsequently scored on a two-point conversion and later won the game with a field goal as time expired.

==== 2023 ====
Bosa appeared in nine games and started five in the 2023 season. He finished with 6.5 sacks, one pass defended, and one forced fumble.

==== 2024 ====
Bosa appeared in 14 games and started nine in the 2024 season. He finished with five sacks and two forced fumbles. He recorded a sack in the Wild Card Round loss to the Texans. On March 5, 2025, Bosa was released by the Chargers. At the time of his release, he was the last remaining player who continuously played with the Chargers in both San Diego and Los Angeles.

=== Buffalo Bills ===
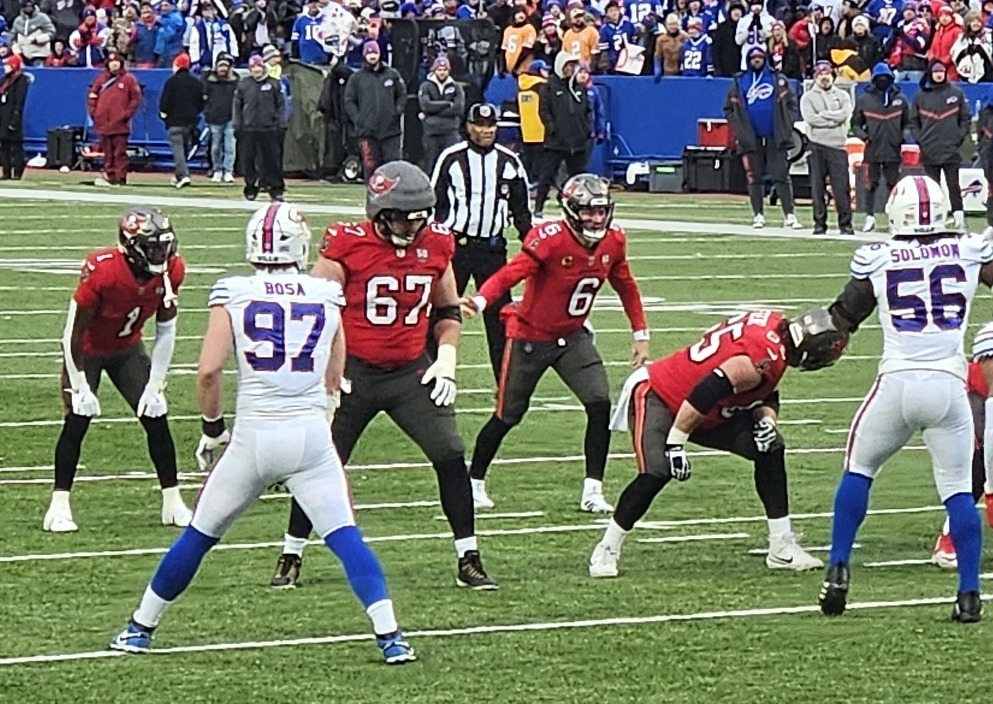
Bosa (#97) and Bills teammate Javon Solomon (#56) against Baker Mayfield and the Tampa Bay Buccaneers in 2025

On March 13, 2025, Bosa signed a one-year, $12.6 million contract with the Buffalo Bills. Bosa made an immediate impact, forcing four fumbles within the first four games, including two against the New York Jets in Week 2. He recorded his fifth forced fumble against the Pittsburgh Steelers, strip-sacking Aaron Rodgers, which set a new Bills team record, but suffered an injury to his hamstring during the game. Bosa finished the 2025 season with five sacks, 29 total tackles (17 solo), and two passes defended.

During the AFC Divisional Round, Bosa was flagged for roughing the passer on Bo Nix. The Bills lost 33–30 in overtime. After the game, Bosa angrily threw his helmet as he and the team were walking through the tunnel. Bosa was later fined $17,389 by the NFL for roughing the passer.

== Career statistics ==
Legend
| | Led the league |
| **Bold** | Career high |

=== NFL ===
==== Regular season ====
| Year | Team | Games | | Tackles | | | | | Interceptions | | | | | | Fumbles | | |
| Year | Team | GP | GS | Cmb | Solo | Ast | Sck | TFL | PD | Int | Yds | Avg | Lng | TD | FF | FR | Yds |
|---|---|---|---|---|---|---|---|---|---|---|---|---|---|---|---|---|---|
| 2016 | SD | 12 | 11 | 41 | 29 | 12 | 10.5 | 17 | 0 | — | — | — | — | — | 1 | 0 | 0 |
| 2017 | LAC | 16 | 16 | **70** | **54** | 16 | **12.5** | 11 | 1 | — | — | — | — | — | 4 | **1** | **1** |
| 2018 | LAC | 7 | 6 | 23 | 18 | 5 | 5.5 | 7 | 0 | — | — | — | — | — | 0 | **1** | 0 |
| 2019 | LAC | 16 | 16 | 67 | 47 | **20** | 11.5 | **18** | 0 | — | — | — | — | — | 1 | 0 | 0 |
| 2020 | LAC | 12 | 10 | 39 | 29 | 10 | 7.5 | 15 | 1 | — | — | — | — | — | 0 | **1** | 0 |
| 2021 | LAC | 16 | 16 | 51 | 36 | 15 | 10.5 | 5 | 0 | — | — | — | — | — | **7** | 0 | 0 |
| 2022 | LAC | 5 | 4 | 10 | 8 | 2 | 2.5 | 3 | 0 | — | — | — | — | — | 1 | 0 | 0 |
| 2023 | LAC | 9 | 5 | 20 | 14 | 6 | 6.5 | 6 | 1 | — | — | — | — | — | 1 | **1** | 0 |
| 2024 | LAC | 14 | 9 | 22 | 17 | 5 | 5.0 | 5 | 0 | — | — | — | — | — | 2 | 0 | 0 |
| 2025 | BUF | 15 | 15 | 29 | 17 | 12 | 5.0 | 9 | **2** | — | — | — | — | — | 5 | 0 | 0 |
| Career | | 122 | 108 | 372 | 269 | 103 | 77.0 | 96 | 5 | 0 | 0 | 0 | 0 | 0 | 22 | 4 | 1 |

==== Postseason ====
| Year | Team | Games | | Tackles | | | | | Interceptions | | | | | | Fumbles | | |
| Year | Team | GP | GS | Cmb | Solo | Ast | Sck | TFL | PD | Int | Yds | Avg | Lng | TD | FF | FR | Yds |
|---|---|---|---|---|---|---|---|---|---|---|---|---|---|---|---|---|---|
| 2018 | LAC | 2 | 2 | **3** | **2** | **1** | **1.0** | **1** | — | — | — | — | — | — | — | — | — |
| 2022 | LAC | 1 | 1 | 1 | 1 | 0 | 0.0 | 0 | — | — | — | — | — | — | — | — | — |
| 2024 | LAC | 1 | 1 | 2 | 1 | **1** | **1.0** | **1** | — | — | — | — | — | — | — | — | — |
| 2025 | BUF | 2 | 2 | **3** | **2** | **1** | 0.0 | 0 | — | — | — | — | — | — | — | — | — |
| Career | | 6 | 6 | 9 | 6 | 3 | 2.0 | 2 | 0 | 0 | 0 | 0 | 0 | 0 | 0 | 0 | 0 |

=== College ===
| Season | Team | GP | Defense | | | | |
| Season | Team | GP | Cmb | TfL | Sck | Int | FF |
|---|---|---|---|---|---|---|---|
| 2013 | Ohio State | 11 | 42 | 13.5 | 7.5 | 0 | 0 |
| 2014 | Ohio State | 15 | **55** | **21.5** | **13.5** | 0 | **4** |
| 2015 | Ohio State | 12 | 51 | 16 | 5.0 | **1** | 1 |
| Total | | 38 | 148 | 51 | 26.0 | 1 | 5 |

== Personal life ==
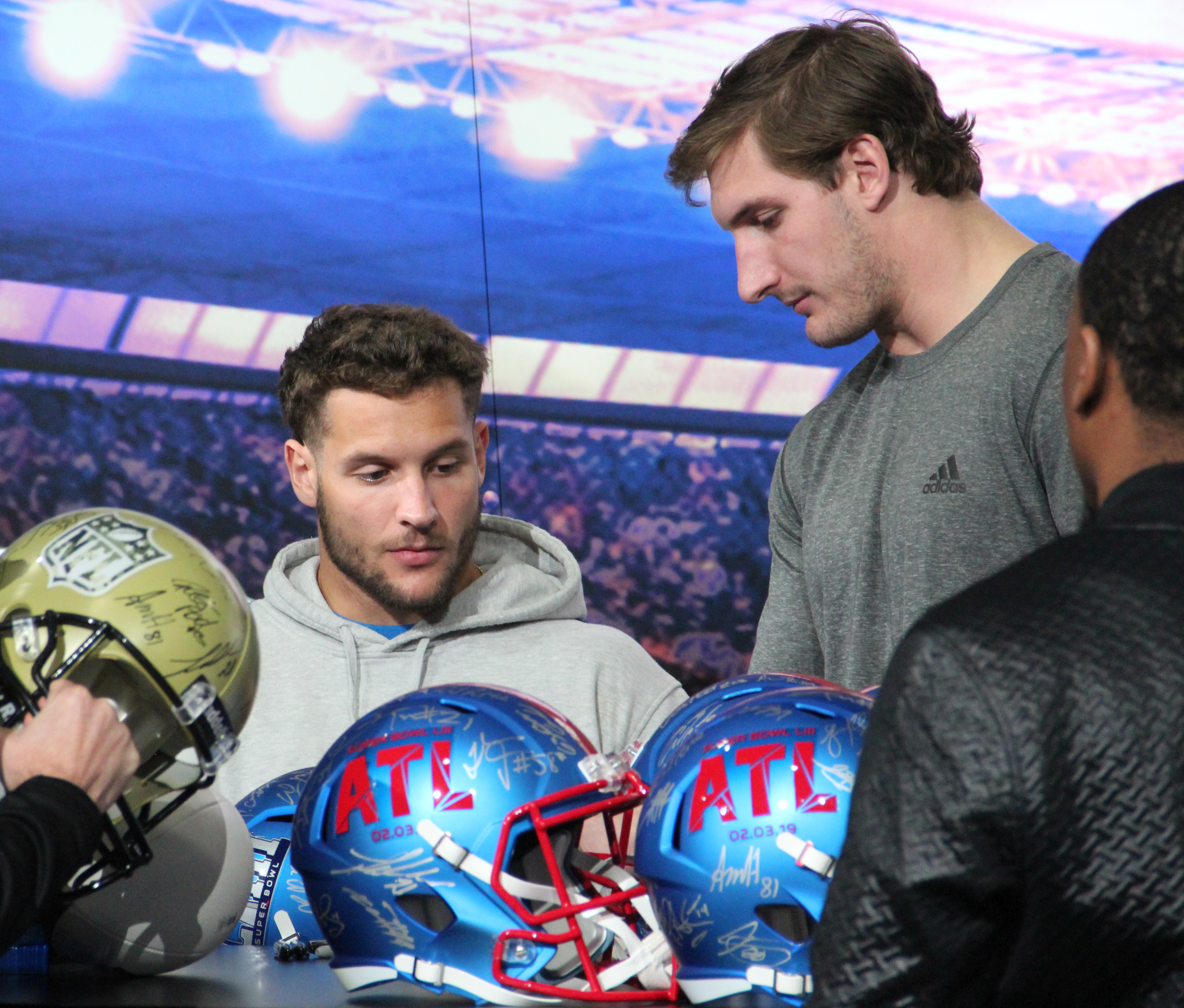
Joey (right) with his brother Nick in 2019

Bosa's father, John Bosa, played in the NFL from 1987 to 1989. His brother, Nick Bosa, also played defensive end at Ohio State, and was selected by the San Francisco 49ers with the second overall pick in 2019. His cousin Jake Kumerow, uncle Eric Kumerow, grandfather Palmer Pyle and great-uncle Mike Pyle have also played in the NFL. His great-grandfather was former Chicago Outfit leader Tony Accardo.

For the National Football League My Cause My Cleats program, Bosa has worn cleats in support of pediatric cancer research. The cleats include #MoreThan4 to advocate that more than 4 percent of funding from the National Cancer Institute total annual budget should be allocated to pediatric cancer research.

In May 2021, as part of a Mental Health Awareness Month campaign for the National Football League, Bosa spoke about how he learned to focus on physical and mental well-being.

Bosa has heterochromia iridium; his left eye is blue and his right eye is green.

== See also ==
- List of second-generation National Football League players
