= Mike Pyle (American football) =

American football player (1939–2015)

- Pyle in 1964

No. 50
- Position: Center

Personal information
- Born: July 18, 1939; Keokuk, Iowa, U.S.
- Died: July 29, 2015 (aged 76); Highland Park, Illinois, U.S.
- Listed height: 6 ft 3 in (1.91 m)
- Listed weight: 250 lb (113 kg)

Career information
- High school: New Trier (Winnetka, Illinois)
- College: Yale
- NFL draft: 1961: 7th round, 89th overall pick
- AFL draft: 1961: 17th round, 134th overall pick

Career history
- Chicago Bears (1961–1969); New Orleans Saints (1970)

Awards and highlights
- NFL champion (1963); Pro Bowl (1963)

Career NFL statistics
- Games played: 121
- Games started: 119
- Fumble recoveries: 4
- Stats at Pro Football Reference

Michael Johnson Pyle (July 18, 1939 – July 29, 2015) was an American professional football player who was a center for nine seasons between 1961 and 1969 in the National Football League (NFL) for the Chicago Bears. In 2019 he was selected as one of the 100 greatest Bears of All-Time.

== Background ==
Pyle was born in 1939 to William Palmer Pyle, an executive with Kraft Foods, and Cathryn Johnson Pyle in Keokuk, Iowa. He has two brothers: William Palmer Pyle Jr. (who played offensive guard at Michigan State University and with the Baltimore Colts, the Minnesota Vikings and the Oakland Raiders) and Harlen Pyle. From Palmer's family, his nephew is Eric Kumerow, and his grand-nephews are Joey and Nick Bosa, as well as Jake Kumerow.

Pyle attended New Trier High School in Winnetka, Illinois, where he wrestled and threw the discus and shot put in addition to playing football. He was an Illinois state wrestling champion in 1957 in the heavyweight division. He also won a state championship in 1957 for his efforts with the discus and set a state record on his way to winning the shot put title, as well.

He graduated in 1957 from New Trier and went on to Yale University, where he was a member of Skull and Bones and Delta Kappa Epsilon fraternity. He was an offensive lineman for the Bulldogs and captained the undefeated, co-Lambert Trophy winner 1960 Yale Bulldogs football team. The 1960 team was ranked 14th in the final AP college football poll and 18th in the final UPI college football poll. He was selected in both the 1961 NFL draft and 1961 AFL draft to the Chicago Bears in the NFL and the New York Titans of the AFL. He ultimately chose to play for the Bears.

== Chicago Bears ==
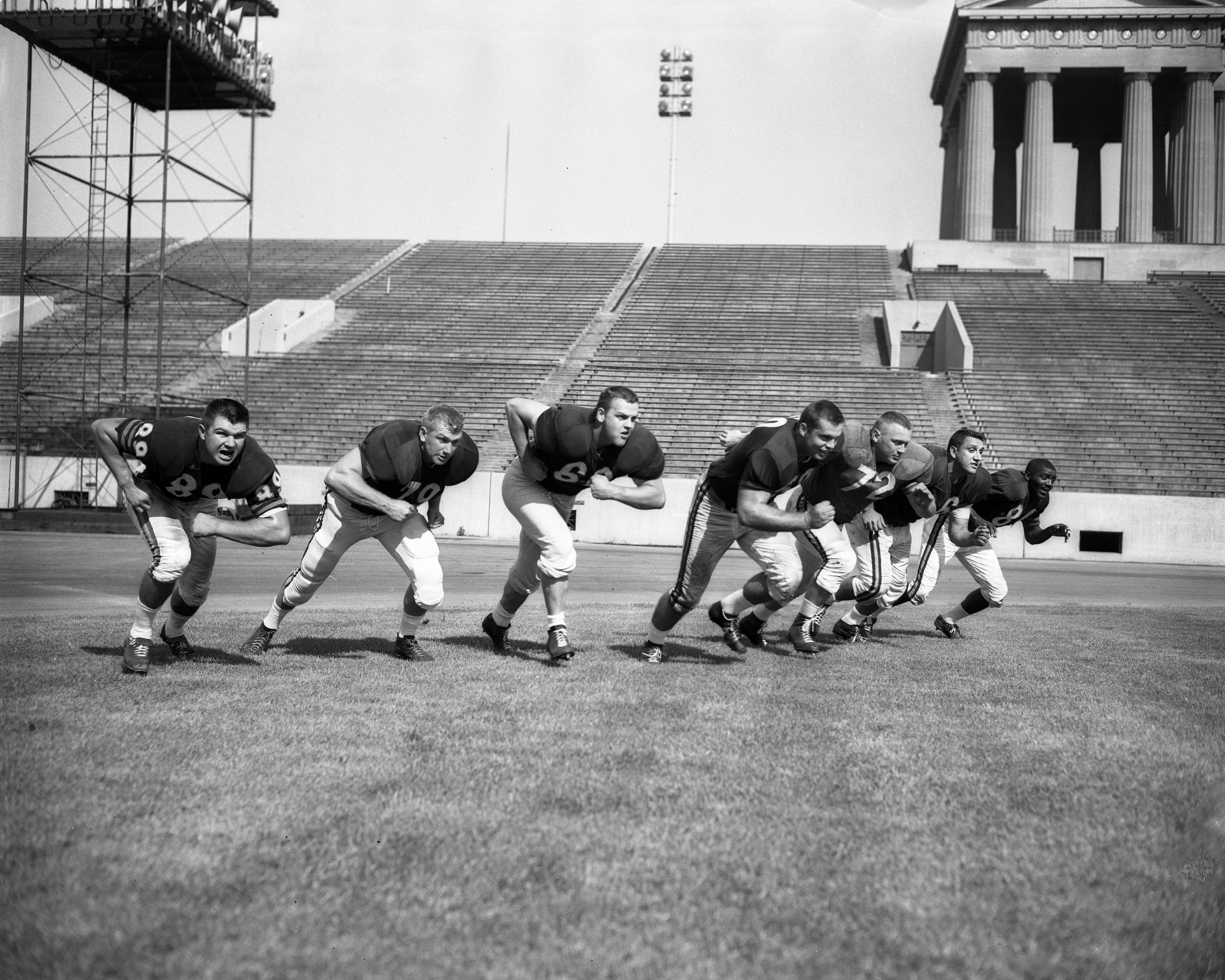
Pyle (center) with the 1961 Bears offensive line

Pyle played nine seasons with the Chicago Bears from 1961 through 1969 where he played for George Halas. In 1963, he earned a Pro Bowl berth and served as the Bears offensive team captain from 1963, their championship season, through his retirement. He was named to the Sporting News First-team - All Conference and the UPI Second-team - All NFL in 1963 and to the New York Daily News All NFL team in 1965.

== Broadcast career ==
After his retirement in 1969, Pyle was a broadcaster for WGN radio, where he was the Bears pre and post game program host, as well as the host of a Sunday sports talk show. He later co-hosted the "Mike Ditka Show" when Ditka coached the Bears.

In 1974, he served as color commentator on the broadcasts of the WFL's Chicago Fire on WJJD.

== Post career health problems ==
Several years after retiring from the NFL, Pyle began to experience symptoms of dementia. His condition eventually worsened, and his family was forced to put him into a full-time assisted living facility. Pyle went to Silverado, a national chain that has an arrangement with the NFL to treat all former players with at least three years of service — and dementia — free of charge.

‘‘We have treated about 20 NFL players — we have about a dozen right now,’’ Loren Shook, the president and CEO of Silverado Senior Living, says. ‘‘This is under the ‘88 Plan’ with the NFL.’’

The 88 Plan is a brain trauma program named for Hall of Fame tight end John Mackey, whose number was 88. Mackey was in a near vegetative state from chronic traumatic encephalopathy (CTE) by the time he died in 2011. Pyle died on July 29, 2015, from a brain hemorrhage. He is one of at least 345 NFL players to be diagnosed after death (CTE) with this disease, which is caused by repeated hits to the head.
