= Palmer Pyle =

American football player (1937–2021)

No. 62, 69, 68
- Position: Guard

Personal information
- Born: June 12, 1937; Keokuk, Iowa, U.S.
- Died: September 30, 2021 (aged 84); Glendale, Arizona, U.S.
- Listed height: 6 ft 3 in (1.91 m)
- Listed weight: 247 lb (112 kg)

Career information
- High school: New Trier (Winnetka, Illinois)
- College: Michigan State
- NFL draft: 1959: 6th round, 72nd overall pick
- AFL draft: 1960: 1st round

Career history
- Baltimore Colts (1960–1963); Minnesota Vikings (1964); Oakland Raiders (1966)

Career NFL/AFL statistics
- Games played: 61
- Games started: 33
- Fumble recoveries: 2
- Stats at Pro Football Reference

William Palmer Pyle Jr. (June 6, 1937 – September 30, 2021) was an American professional football guard who played in the National Football League (NFL) and the American Football League (AFL). He played a total of six seasons for the NFL's Baltimore Colts and Minnesota Vikings, as well as the AFL's Oakland Raiders.

Pyle was married to Marie Accardo and they had two children together, Eric and Cheryl. The couple later divorced. When Marie remarried, both children took the Kumerow surname.

Pyle's brother Mike Pyle and son Eric Kumerow also had NFL careers, as well as his grandsons, Joey and Nick Bosa and Jake Kumerow.
