= Jake Kumerow =

American football player (born 1992)

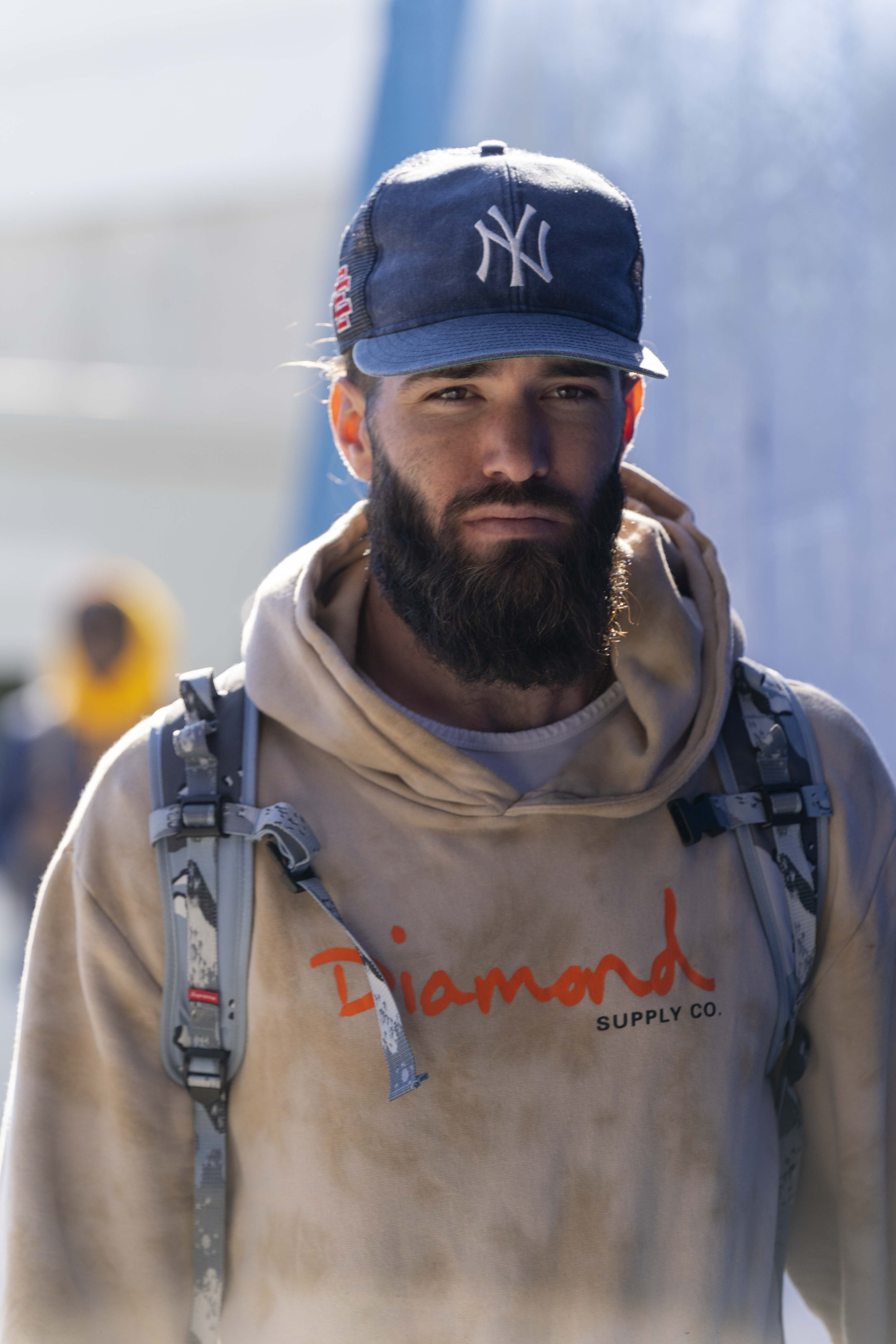
- Kumerow in 2021

No. 16, 87, 15
- Position: Wide receiver

Personal information
- Born: February 17, 1992 (age 34); Bartlett, Illinois, U.S.
- Listed height: 6 ft 4 in (1.93 m)
- Listed weight: 209 lb (95 kg)

Career information
- High school: South Elgin (South Elgin, Illinois)
- College: Illinois (2010–2011); UW–Whitewater (2012–2014)
- NFL draft: 2015: undrafted

Career history
- Cincinnati Bengals (2015–2017); New England Patriots (2017)*; Green Bay Packers (2017–2019); Buffalo Bills (2020); New Orleans Saints (2020); Buffalo Bills (2021–2022)
- * Offseason or practice squad member only

Awards and highlights
- 2× NCAA DIII national champion (2013, 2014); 2× First-team All-WIAC (2013, 2014); D3Football.com Offensive Player of the Year (2014)

Career NFL statistics
- Receptions: 27
- Receiving yards: 436
- Receiving touchdowns: 3
- Stats at Pro Football Reference

Jake Anthony Kumerow (born February 17, 1992) is an American former professional football player who was a wide receiver in the National Football League (NFL). He played college football for the Illinois Fighting Illini and UW–Whitewater Warhawks, and was signed by the Cincinnati Bengals as an undrafted free agent in 2015. He was also a member of the New England Patriots, Green Bay Packers, New Orleans Saints, and Buffalo Bills.

== College career ==
Kumerow originally attended the Illinois Fighting Illini football program. He caught 3 passes for 15 yards with the Illini. He then transferred to NCAA Division III school Wisconsin–Whitewater Warhawks. Kumerow finished with 158 receptions for 2,648 yards and 36 touchdowns for the Warhawks.

== Professional career ==
Pre-draft measurables
Height	Weight	Arm length	Hand span	40-yard dash	10-yard split	20-yard split	20-yard shuttle	Three-cone drill	Vertical jump	Broad jump	Bench press	Wonderlic
6 ft 4 1/2 in (1.94 m)	209 lb (95 kg)	31 7/8 in (0.81 m)	9 1/2 in (0.24 m)	4.54 s	1.62 s	2.60 s	4.26 s	6.90 s	31.0 in (0.79 m)	9 ft 5 in (2.87 m)	15 reps	22
All values from Pro Day

=== Cincinnati Bengals ===
Kumerow signed with the Cincinnati Bengals as an undrafted free agent on May 8, 2015. He was released on September 5, 2015, and was signed to the practice squad the next day, where he spent his entire rookie season. He signed a reserve/future contract with the Bengals on January 11, 2016.

Kumerow was released by the Bengals on September 3, 2016, and was signed to the practice squad during the next day. He was promoted to the active roster on December 27, 2016.

On August 9, 2017, Kumerow was waived/injured by the Bengals after suffering an ankle injury and was placed on injured reserve. He was released on September 22, 2017 with an injury settlement.

=== New England Patriots ===
On October 26, 2017, Kumerow was signed to the New England Patriots' practice squad. He was released on November 9, 2017.

=== Green Bay Packers ===
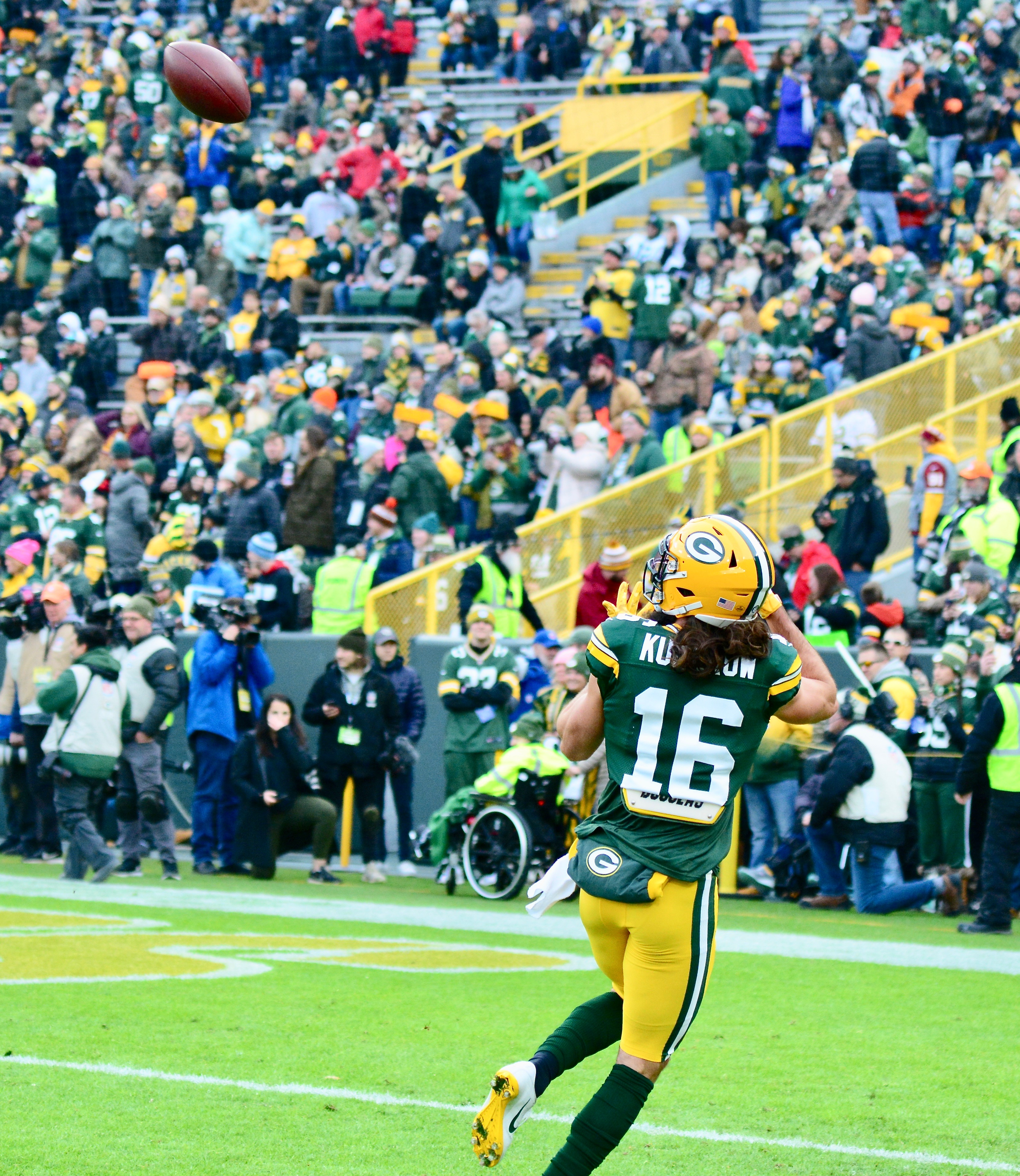
Kumerow with the Green Bay Packers in 2019

On December 26, 2017, Kumerow was signed to the Green Bay Packers' practice squad. He signed a reserve/future contract with the Packers on January 2, 2018.

On September 3, 2018, Kumerow was placed on injured reserve. He was activated off injured reserve on December 1, 2018 and made his NFL debut the following day, in a week 13 loss to the Arizona Cardinals. He also recorded his first career reception, an 11-yard pass from Aaron Rodgers, during that game. On December 23, he scored his first NFL touchdown on a 49-yard reception against the New York Jets at MetLife Stadium.

Kumerow returned to the Packers on March 11, 2019.

On April 25, 2020, the Packers re-signed Kumerow as an exclusive-rights free agent, which kept him under contract for Green Bay for another year. He was released during final roster cuts on September 5, 2020. Rodgers had publicly praised Kumerow's play during a press conference a day before his release. As a result it served as a tipping point between the team and Rodgers, who had developed a rapport with the receiver and was reportedly upset with Packers management over his departure.

=== Buffalo Bills (first stint) ===
On September 8, 2020, Kumerow was signed to the practice squad of the Buffalo Bills. He was elevated to the active roster on November 7, November 14, and November 28 for the team's weeks 9, 10, and 12 games against the Seattle Seahawks, Arizona Cardinals, Los Angeles Chargers, and reverted to the practice squad after each game. He was promoted to the active roster on December 2, 2020. Kumerow caught a touchdown pass from Josh Allen against the Denver Broncos in week 15, helping convert a second and goal from the 22-yard line. He was waived on December 24, 2020 with starter John Brown returning from injured reserve.

=== New Orleans Saints ===
On December 25, 2020, Kumerow was claimed off waivers by the New Orleans Saints. He was waived on January 9, 2021. On January 13, 2021, Kumerow re-signed with the Saints practice squad. He was released on January 18.

=== Buffalo Bills (second stint) ===
On January 26, 2021, Kumerow signed a reserve/futures contract with the Bills. In the 2021 preseason, Bills quarterback Josh Allen joked that Kumerow was his favorite wide receiver, because his only regular season catch for the Bills was for a touchdown.

On March 10, 2022, Kumerow signed a one-year contract extension with the Bills. On June 16, Kumerow was released by the Bills for salary cap purposes and was re-signed the next day. On November 17, after an ankle injury in a game against the Minnesota Vikings, he was placed on injured reserve.

Kumerow never re-signed with the Bills and remained a free agent throughout the 2023 off-season.

== Personal life ==
Kumerow is the son of former Miami Dolphins linebacker Eric Kumerow. He is also the nephew of former Dolphins defensive end John Bosa, and a cousin to Joey and Nick Bosa. His sister Cortney was an All-American basketball player at UW-Whitewater, and their youngest brother Derek played football at Whitewater as well. His grandfather is former NFL Guard Palmer Pyle and his great-uncle is former Chicago Bears Center Mike Pyle. He is also the great-grandson of former Chicago Mob boss Tony Accardo.

Kumerow earned the nickname “Touchdown Jesus” originally in the preseason for the Packers due to his long hair and thick beard.

== NFL career statistics ==
Regular season statistics
Year	Team	Games		Receiving					Fumbles	
Year	Team	GP	GS	Rec	Yds	Avg	Lng	TD	Fum	Lost
2018	GB	5	2	8	103	12.9	49	1	0	0
2019	GB	14	4	12	219	18.3	49	1	0	0
2020	BUF	6	0	1	22	22.0	22	1	0	0
2021	BUF	15	2	2	28	14.0	15	0	0	0
2022	BUF	6	1	4	64	16.0	39	0	0	0
Total		46	9	27	436	16.1	49	3	0	0
Source: NFL.com

Postseason statistics
Year	Team	Games		Receiving					Fumbles	
Year	Team	GP	GS	Rec	Yds	Avg	Lng	TD	Fum	Lost
2019	GB	2	0	1	23	23.0	23	0	0	0
2021	BUF	2	0	0	0	0.0	0	0	0	0
2022	BUF	0	0	DNP						
Total		4	0	1	23	23.0	23	0	0	0
Source: pro-football-reference.com
