= Michael Lerner (angler) =

American angler

- Born: September 5, 1890; Philadelphia, Pennsylvania
- Died: April 16, 1978 (aged 87); Miami, Florida
- Known for: Pioneer of big game angling
- Spouse: Helen

Michael Lerner (born September 5, 1890 - April 16, 1978) was an American angler and businessman.

== Early life ==
He was born in Philadelphia and was one of seven children of Sophie (née Eisenberg) and Charles Lerner.

== Career ==
Along with his father and brothers, he founded Lerner Shops (now New York & Company), a national chain of women's clothing shops.

He left the retail chain in the early 1930s and devoted his life to big game hunting, fishing and marine research. His fishing and hunting adventures were chronicled in the New York Times throughout the 1930s and 1940s. In 1935, he pioneered the rod-and-reel fishery for giant tuna in Wedgeport, Nova Scotia. He managed to convince Captain Évée LeBlanc to take him fishing and accompanied by his guide, Tommy Gifford, he managed to catch five Bluefin during his first visit. He returned to Wedgeport in September 1935 and caught 21 tuna in the course of 11 days, varying in size from 86 to 450 pounds. He founded and funded the International Game Fish Association (IGFA) in 1939. He founded the American Museum of Natural History's Lerner Marine Laboratory on Bimini in The Bahamas. He received an honorary Doctor of Science degree from the University of Miami, and was awarded the first Gold Medal Angler's Award by the International Oceanographic Foundation for being the "sport fisherman who has accomplished the most for marine science."

== Death ==
He died of cancer at his home in Miami on April 16, 1978.

== Legacy ==
Lerner is commemorated in the scientific name of a subspecies of lizard, Anolis smaragdinus lerneri, which is endemic to The Bahamas.
