= Pierre LeBlanc =

- Born: c. 1720; Grand-Pré, Nova Scotia
- Died: July 6, 1799; Pointe-de-l'Église, Nova Scotia
- Spouse: Marie-Madeleine Babin

Pierre LeBlanc (c. 1720 – July 6, 1799) was an Acadian pioneer and co-founder of Pointe-de-l'Église, Nova Scotia.

== Early life ==
He was born in Grand-Pré, Nova Scotia around 1720, the son of Jacques Le Blanc and Élisabeth Boudrot.

In 1755, Pierre was deported to Boston with his four children Pierre and his wife. Pierre and his family lived in Lynn, Massachusetts, and they were still living there in April 1767 when their tenth child was born. In 1771, LeBlanc and fellow exile, François Doucet, sailed to Nova Scotia. They explored the area of Clare, where fellow Acadians had returned from exile and lived since 1768. In 1772, Pierre and his family returned to Nova Scotia and settled in Pointe-de-l’Église. LeBlanc then obtained a land grant of 200 acres that year, and gained 350 acres more in 1785.

== Personal life ==
He married Marie-Madeleine Babin on October 4, 1745, in Grand-Pré, Nova Scotia. They had ten children. LeBlanc's son, Joseph, was a pioneer of Wedgeport, settling in the area in 1778.
