= Armand LeBlanc =

American politician (1921–2004)

Member of the Maine House of Representatives
- In office 1973 – July 31, 1977

Personal details
- Born: September 5, 1921
- Died: October 3, 2004 (aged 83)
- Party: Democratic
- Occupation: Politician

Armand LeBlanc (September 5, 1921 – October 3, 2004) was an American politician from Maine. LeBlanc, a Democrat, served in the Maine House of Representatives from 1973 to July 31, 1977, when he resigned. He was a resident of Van Buren, Maine.
