= Nicole M. LeBlanc =

American fashion designer

Nicole Mercedes LeBlanc is an American fashion designer and head milliner of Fleur de Paris in New Orleans. She grew up in New Orleans and received a B.A. in French and Political Science in 1985 from Newcomb College of Tulane University. Since 1983 she has been designing hats exclusively for Fleur de Paris in New Orleans’ French Quarter. LeBlanc has designed at least 15,000 hats – no two exactly alike — since she began her millinery career.

LeBlanc received a Thomas J. Watson Fellowship in 1986 which she used the award to pursue independent millinery studies in London, Paris, and Florence. While living in London, LeBlanc was an award winner in the 1987 Young Designers of Great Britain Millinery Competition.

She is one of the subjects in “What is it about Hats?”, a documentary by Andee Kinzy about hats, hat lovers and millinery. Fleur de Paris, LeBlanc and her hats have been featured in The Hat Magazine (Winter 2006), The New York Times; The Dallas Morning News ("She's Got a Head for Ladies' Hats", April 15, 2001); Southern Living; Platinum Magazine (Fall 2002); Where Magazine, The Times-Picayune (fashion section profile, April 1986), CityLife, Essential New Orleans (inaugural issue, Fall 2003, "Crowning Southern Ladies and Gentlemen"), Scat, Southern Woman and Gambit; the Greenville (SC) News-Piedmont (spring 1986); various Tulane University publications; the British Home Stores employee magazine (Winter 1987); and the illustrated travel book "Very New Orleans" (among many other guides to the city), She has also been profiled twice on New Orleans television for her Easter creations. Fleur de Paris and LeBlanc's hats were prominently featured in a pivotal scene of the Melanie Griffith film Crazy in Alabama. She was also the subject of articles in Southwest Airlines "Spirit" magazine and FrenchQuarter.com At least 11 of her hats have been chosen for display in the past three years at the Kentucky Derby Museum, and her work has been selected for inclusion in a hat calendar.

In a New York Times essay following Hurricane Katrina and the subsequent tragic flooding of most of New Orleans, author Mark Childress listed the hats at Fleur de Paris as the #2 thing that should be missed about the city. LeBlanc also been featured in several radio stories and media reports.
