= Martaizé =

- Commune
- Location of Martaizé
- Location within France Location within Nouvelle-Aquitaine
- Coordinates: 46°55′03″N 0°03′43″E
- Country: France
- Region: Nouvelle-Aquitaine
- Department: Vienne
- Arrondissement: Châtellerault
- Canton: Loudun
- Intercommunality: Pays Loudunais

Government
  - Mayor (2020–2026): Jean-Marc Mureau
- Area^{1}: 19.48 km^{2} (7.52 sq mi)
- Elevation: 55 m (180 ft)
- Highest elevation: 84 m (276 ft)
- Lowest elevation: 53 m (174 ft)
- Population (2023): 355
  - Density: 18.2/km^{2} (47.2/sq mi)
- Time zone: UTC+01:00 (CET)
  - Summer (DST): UTC+02:00 (CEST)
- INSEE/Postal code: 86149 /86330
- ^{1} French Land Register data, which excludes lakes, ponds, glaciers > 1 km^{2} (0.386 sq mi or 247 acres) and river estuaries.

Martaizé (French pronunciation: [maʁtɛze]) is a commune in the Vienne department in the Nouvelle-Aquitaine region in western France. It is a small village about 7 miles from Loudun.

== History ==
In the early 17th century, Martaizé, along with the nearby village of La Chaussée, was one of the seigneuries of Charles de Menou d'Aulnay. Several of the earliest settlers of Acadia including the Heberts, Babins, the Gaudets, the LeBlancs, the Bourgs, the Poiriers, the Theriots, the Guérins and the Savoies are believed to have been recruited by d'Aulnay from their original home in Martaizé to colonize New France.

== Demographics ==
Historical population
Year	Pop.	±% p.a.
1968	519	—
1975	428	−2.72%
1982	406	−0.75%
1990	433	+0.81%
1999	389	−1.18%
2007	371	−0.59%
2012	395	+1.26%
2017	380	−0.77%
2023	355	−1.13%
Source: INSEE

== See also ==
- Communes of the Vienne department
