= Ken Leblanc =

Ken Leblanc may refer to:

- Ken Leblanc (bobsleigh) (born 1968), Canadian Olympic bobsledder
- Ken LeBlanc (entrepreneur) (born 1969), New Brunswick entrepreneur
