= Amy K. LeBlanc =

American veterinarian scientist

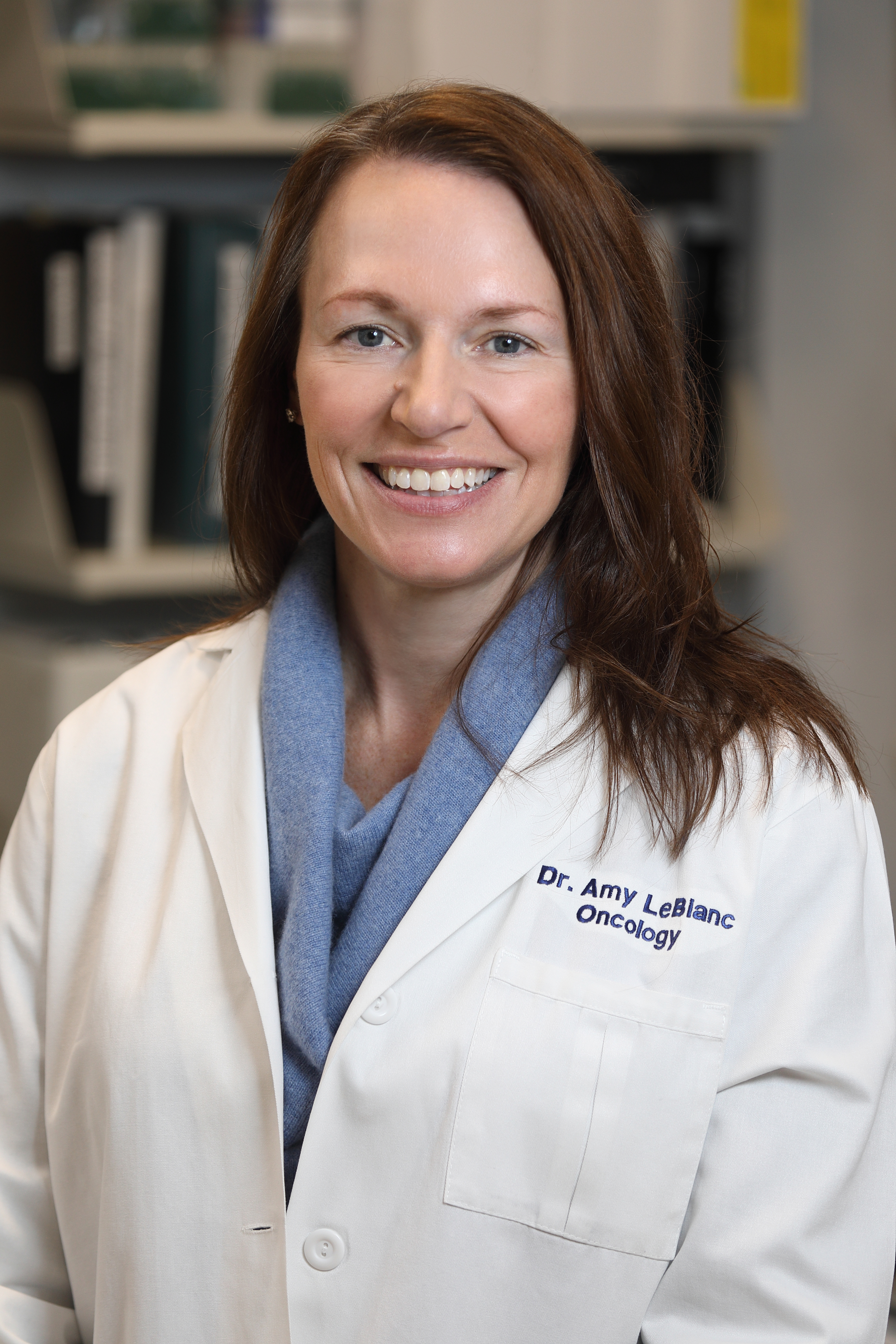
- Education: Michigan State University (BS, DVM)
- Scientific career
- Fields: Veterinary oncology, cancer biology, comparative medicine
- Workplaces: University of Tennessee; National Cancer Institute

Amy Kathleen LeBlanc is an American veterinary oncologist and biologist researching animal modeling for development of new cancer drugs and imaging agents, and identification of imaging biomarkers, development and optimization of PET imaging hardware and imaging protocols. She is a senior scientist in the molecular imaging program and director of the Comparative Oncology Program at the National Cancer Institute. LeBlanc was previously an associate professor at the University of Tennessee College of Medicine and College of Veterinary Medicine.

== Education ==
LeBlanc graduated from Michigan State University with a B.S. and D.V.M. She completed a rotating internship in small animal medicine and surgery at Texas A&M University and a residency in companion animal oncology at Louisiana State University. She is board-certified by the American College of Veterinary Internal Medicine.

== Career and research ==
LeBlanc was an associate professor with tenure and director of translational research at the University of Tennessee College of Veterinary Medicine (CVM) and University of Tennessee College of Medicine. LeBlanc's group at the University of Tennessee published the first comprehensive studies describing molecular imaging of dogs and cats using PET-CT, focusing on the forward and back-translation of 18F-labelled radiopharmaceuticals.

LeBlanc is a board-certified veterinary oncologist and senior scientist in the molecular imaging program at the National Cancer Institute (NCI). She is director of the NCI's Comparative Oncology Program. Her research focus is in animal modeling for development of new cancer drugs and imaging agents, and identification of imaging biomarkers, development and optimization of PET imaging hardware and imaging protocols. In her position, she oversees and manages the operations of the Comparative Oncology Trials Consortium (COTC), which designs and executes clinical trials of new cancer therapies in tumor-bearing pet dogs.
