= Evée LeBlanc =

Canadian fishing captain

- Born: August 20, 1878; Wedgeport, Nova Scotia, Canada
- Died: September 26, 1978 (aged 100); Yarmouth, Nova Scotia, Canada
- Occupation: Fishing captain
- Known for: Pioneer of tuna fishery

Evée LeBlanc (August 20, 1878 – September 26, 1978) was a Canadian fishing captain who pioneered the tuna fishing industry in Wedgeport, Nova Scotia. LeBlanc was internationally known for taking American tourists on fishing trips, including President Franklin D. Roosevelt and aviator Amelia Earhart.

== Early life ==
He was born in Wedgeport, Nova Scotia, the son of Jean Toussaint and Dorothée (Boudreau) LeBlanc.

== Fishing career ==
In the 1920s, harpooning tuna began as a small industry in Wedgeport, Evée LeBlanc was one of three men who pioneered this industry. During this time, LeBlanc would bring along tourists on his boat, "The Judge". By 1934, LeBlanc had pioneered rod-and-reel fishing in Wedgeport, having taken several well-known American tourists fishing in his boat. One of these tourists LeBlanc took tuna fishing was American aviator Amelia Earhart, who spent two weeks in the area in 1934. In August 1935, American angler Michael Lerner and his guide Tommy Gifford visited Wedgeport to fish tuna. He managed to convince LeBlanc to take him fishing and he caught five Bluefin during his first visit. Lerner returned to Wedgeport in September 1935 and accompanied by LeBlanc and Gifford, caught 21 tuna in the course of 11 days, varying in size from 86 to 450 pounds. In July 1936, LeBlanc took American President Franklin D. Roosevelt tuna fishing on his boat "The Judge II". President Roosevelt did not manage to catch a tuna. In July 1942, LeBlanc caught an 800-pound tuna off of Wedgeport.

== Later life and death ==
On June 25, 1978, an Acadian celebration was held in Ste. Anne du Ruisseau, during which LeBlanc's 100th birthday was celebrated. LeBlanc played the accordion at his birthday celebration. LeBlanc died in Yarmouth on September 26, 1978, one month after his 100th birthday.

== Personal life ==
He was married to Rose (LeBlanc) and they had six children.
