= Grand Dérangement (band) =

Canadian musical group

- Origin: Nova Scotia, Canada
- Genres: folk
- Members: Daniel Leblanc; Briand Melanson; Jean-Pascal Comeau; Charles Robicheau; Danielle LeBlanc
- Past members: Jacky Comeau; Christiane Theriault; Erin Westby; Janice Comeau; Natalie Robichaud; Armand Dionne; Monique Comeau; Suzanne Comeau

Grand Dérangement is an Acadian folk band from southwestern Nova Scotia whose style shows influence of Acadian, American, Celtic, and French music. The band's name, literally, "great disturbance", comes from the French name for the Great Expulsion of the Acadians by the British in 1755, a major turning point in Acadian history. Grand Dérangement has toured in the US, Canada, France, Switzerland, and Germany.

Members Briand Melanson, Daniel Leblanc, Jean-Pascal Comeau, and Charles Robicheau have collaborated with musicians such as Luc Tardif, Nathalie Geddry, Jeanne Doucette-Currie, Jean-Étienne Sheehy, and Alphonse Melanson, and have performed at events such as Le Gala des Prix Éloize, Le Gala de la Chanson de la Nouvelle-Écosse, and The Church Point Tsunami Fundraising Concert.

== History ==
In the 1990s, after quitting the band Blou, childhood friends Daniel LeBlanc and Briand Melanson began collaborating with local artist Michel Thibault. The three then recruited well-known pianist Jacky Comeau and started to work on their first album. In 1998, the band released its first album, Tournons la page. In 2000, the band released its second album, Danse dans les flammes to great critical acclaim. Though Comeau left the band shortly afterwards due to health issues, the band toured North America and Europe in support of their album, with replacement pianist Armand Dionne from New Brunswick and another new member, guitarist Jean-Pascal Comeau.

In 2004, the band's song "Je reviens au berceau de l'Acadie" was selected as the theme song of the World Acadian Congress. The song was later released on the band's third album, an EP entitled 2004 which included re-recorded versions of songs off the first album. The band followed their EP with their fourth album, Dérangé, which was popular on the radio and brought Grand Dérangement greater popular acclaim. After the success of Dérange, Grand Dérangement brought on another member, Charles Robicheau. In late 2005, the band released Plane un aigle, which included songs from Dérangé and 2004. The band has since brought on several step-dancers, including Monique Comeau. On August 15, 2006, the band recorded their first live album, LIVE, which was released in August 2007.

== Albums ==
- Tournons la page (1998)
- Danse dans les flammes (2000)
- 2004 (2003)
- Dérangé (2005)
- Plane un aigle (France Release) (2005)
- LIVE (2007)

== Members ==
- Grand Dérangement in 2006

The current members of Grand Dérangement are:

- Daniel LeBlanc (Fiddle, Guitar, Vocals) — Degree received from the California Guitare Institute of Technology
- Briand Melanson (Percussion, lead Vocals) — Degree received from the California Percussion Institute of Technology
- Jean-Pascal Comeau (Bass guitar, Step dance) — Studied at the California Bass Institute of Technology
- Charles Robicheau (Guitar)
- Danielle LeBlanc (Step dance)

Past members include:

- Jacques (Jackie) Comeau (Keyboard)
- Christiane Theriault, Erin Westby, Janice Comeau, Natalie Robichaud (Step dance)
- Armand Dionne (Keyboards)
- Monique Comeau (Step dance)— Bachelor of Fine Arts in dance at York University, Toronto, ON and graduate of dance performance program at George Brown College, Toronto, ON
- Suzanne Comeau (Step dance)
