= John Bosa =

American football player (born 1964)

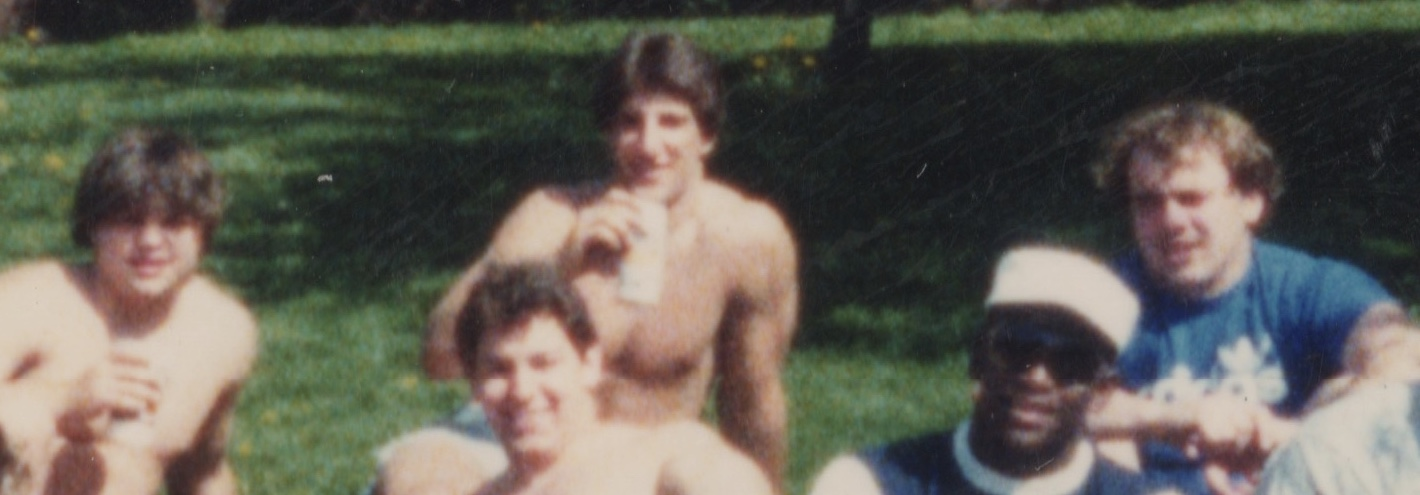

No. 97
- Position: Defensive end

Personal information
- Born: January 10, 1964 (age 62); Keene, New Hampshire, U.S.
- Listed height: 6 ft 4 in (1.93 m)
- Listed weight: 270 lb (122 kg)

Career information
- High school: Keene
- College: Boston College
- NFL draft: 1987: 1st round, 16th overall pick

Career history
- Miami Dolphins (1987–1989)

Awards and highlights
- PFWA All-Rookie Team (1987); Third-team All-American (1986); First-team All-East (1986); Second-team All-East (1985)

Career NFL statistics
- Sacks: 7
- Fumble recoveries: 2
- Stats at Pro Football Reference

John Wilfred Bosa (born January 10, 1964) is an American former professional football player who played defensive end for three seasons in the National Football League (NFL). He played college football for the Boston College Eagles and was selected by the Miami Dolphins in the first round of the 1987 NFL draft.

== Early life ==
Bosa was born on January 10, 1964 in Keene, New Hampshire. He attended Keene High School.

== Professional career ==
Pre-draft measurables
Height	Weight	Arm length	Hand span	40-yard dash	10-yard split	20-yard split	20-yard shuttle	Vertical jump	Broad jump	Bench press
6 ft 4 1/8 in (1.93 m)	267 lb (121 kg)	31 1/2 in (0.80 m)	9 3/4 in (0.25 m)	4.85 s	1.60 s	2.78 s	4.41 s	28.0 in (0.71 m)	8 ft 3 in (2.51 m)	27 reps
All values from NFL Combine

John was selected by the Dolphins in the first round (16th overall) of the 1987 NFL draft.

== Personal life ==
His elder son, Joey Bosa, played college football at Ohio State University and was selected third overall in the 2016 NFL draft by the San Diego Chargers. His younger son, Nick Bosa, also played college football at Ohio State and was selected second overall in the 2019 NFL draft by the San Francisco 49ers. With that, the Bosas became the third family to have three members drafted in the first round of an NFL draft behind the Matthews and the Mannings. He is the grandson-in-law of Tony Accardo, former boss of the Chicago Outfit.
