= Wedgeport =

Community in Nova Scotia, Canada

Coordinates: 43.7398°N 65.9800°W

Wedgeport in Nova Scotia

Wedgeport is an unincorporated community in the Canadian province of Nova Scotia, located in the Municipality of the District of Argyle in Yarmouth County.

== History ==
Historical population
Year	Pop.	±%
1901	1,026	—
1911	1,392	+35.7%
1921	1,424	+2.3%
1931	1,294	−9.1%
1941	1,327	+2.6%
2006	1,207	−9.0%
2011	1,180	−2.2%
2016	1,061	−10.1%
2021	1,071	+0.9%

Wedgeport was settled in 1767 by returning Acadians who had been deported to the Boston area. The village of Wedgeport was formally called Tusket Wedge, and was also at one time called the "Chebec". In 1909 by an Act of Parliament, it was changed to Wedgeport.

In the 20th century, many famous Americans and Canadians traveled here due to large amounts of tuna in the area, including Babe Ruth, President Franklin Roosevelt, Kate Smith, Gene Tunney, Amelia Earhart, Ernest Hemingway, Jean Béliveau, Ethel du Pont, Thomas Gifford, Michael Lerner, Zane Grey and Tony Hulman. It is known as the "Historic Sport Tuna Fishing Capital of the World". Many of these famous Americans were taken on fishing trips by Captain Evée LeBlanc.

In 1937, the International Tuna Cup Match began with the participation of 28 different countries. In 1949, 72 Bluefin tuna were caught for a total weight of 30,161 pounds, the most tuna as well as the highest weight ever caught in a tournament to date. The tournament ended in 1976 due to a lack of tuna, but the tournament was revived in 2004. The 13th annual Wedgeport Tuna Tournament & Festival took place in August 2016.

Wedgeport hosts the annual Festival Acadien de Wedgeport each summer. The Festival celebrates Acadian heritage and includes concerts, variety shows, a parade, an Acadian pageant, traditional costumes, dances and a softball tournament.

== Demographics ==
In the 2021 Census of Population conducted by Statistics Canada, Wedgeport had a population of 1,071 living in 478 of its 534 total private dwellings, a change of 0.9% from its 2016 population of 1,061. With a land area of 9.64 km^{2} (3.72 sq mi), it had a population density of 111.1/km^{2} (287.7/sq mi) in 2021.

== Government ==
In 1910, the community of Wedgeport was incorporated with Upper Wedgeport and Lower Wedgeport and became a town separate from the Municipality of the District of Argyle. In 1947, the town was dissolved and rejoined the Municipality of Argyle because the town's tax base became too small to support its obligations.

=== Mayors ===
There were ten mayors of Wedgeport during its incorporation.

- Jacques R. LeBlanc 1910-1913
- Joseph Pothier 1913-1914
- Jacques R. LeBlanc 1914-1916
- Pierre G. LeBlanc 1916-1918
- Jacques R. LeBlanc 1918-1920
- Alfred L. LeBlanc 1920-1921
- Pius Z. Boudreau 1921-1924
- J. Zébédée Cottreau 1924-1928
- Denis D. LeBlanc 1928-1936
- Willard O'Brien 1936-1943
- David Z. LeBlanc 1943-1946
- Walter D. Murphy 1946-1947
