= Daniel W. LeBlanc =

American judge

Daniel Wallace LeBlanc (1930 – May 12, 2013) was an American lawyer and jurist.

Born in Baton Rouge, Louisiana, LeBlanc was the son of Fred S. LeBlanc, Sr. who was a politician and jurist in Louisiana. He served in the United States Army in Korea. He graduated from Spring Hill College and received his law degree from Loyola University New Orleans College of Law.

He practiced law in Baton Rouge and then served as a Baton Rouge city court judge and Louisiana district court judge. He was elected to the Louisiana Court of Appeals and retired in 2002. He died in Baton Rouge, Louisiana.
