= Elliss =

Elliss is a surname. Notable people with the surname include:

- Christian Elliss (born 1999), American football player
- Jonah Elliss (born 2003), American football player
- Kaden Elliss (born 1995), American football player
- Luther Elliss (born 1973), American football player
- Noah Elliss (born 1999), American football player

== See also ==
- Ellias
- Ellis
