= 2023 Philadelphia Eagles season =

91st season in franchise history

- Owner: Jeffrey Lurie
- General manager: Howie Roseman
- Head coach: Nick Sirianni
- Offensive coordinator: Brian Johnson
- Defensive coordinator: Sean Desai
- Home stadium: Lincoln Financial Field

Results
- Record: 11–6
- Division place: 2nd NFC East
- Playoffs: Lost Wild Card Playoffs (at Buccaneers) 9–32
- All-Pros: 4: C Jason Kelce (1st team); WR A. J. Brown (2nd team); T Lane Johnson (2nd team); K Jake Elliott (2nd team)
- Pro Bowlers: 8: QB Jalen Hurts; RB D'Andre Swift; WR A. J. Brown; T Lane Johnson; G Landon Dickerson; C Jason Kelce; OLB Haason Reddick; CB Darius Slay

Uniform
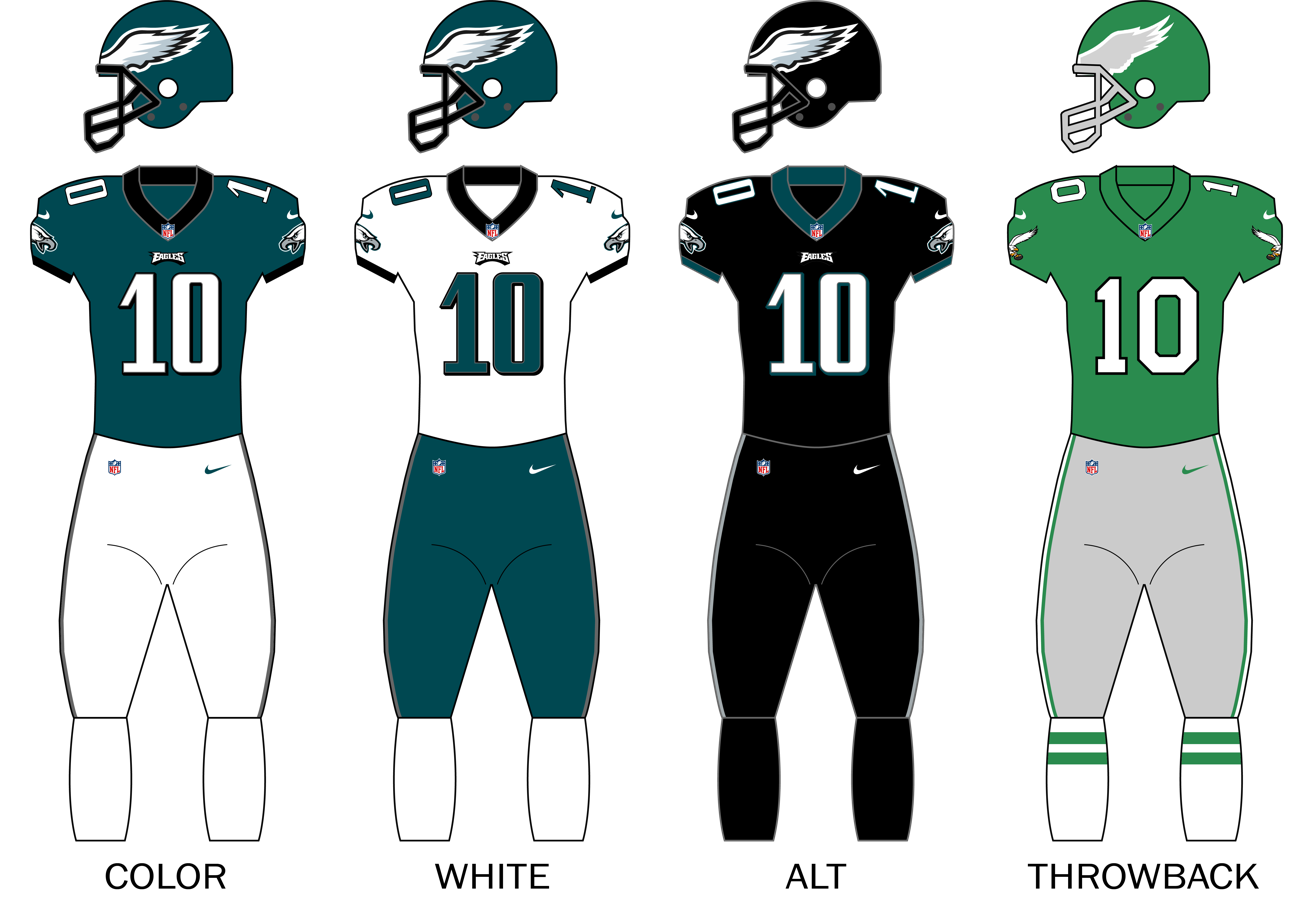

The 2023 season was the Philadelphia Eagles' 91st season in the National Football League (NFL), their 30th under the ownership of Jeffrey Lurie and their third under head coach Nick Sirianni. The Eagles entered the season as defending NFC champions.

The Eagles failed to equal or improve on their 14–3 record from the previous year after their loss to the Seattle Seahawks in Week 15. Despite this, the Eagles clinched their third consecutive playoff berth and sixth in seven years the same week, with the Green Bay Packers losing to the Tampa Bay Buccaneers, the Atlanta Falcons losing to the Carolina Panthers, and the San Francisco 49ers defeating the Arizona Cardinals.

Despite starting with a 10–1 record for the second consecutive season, the Eagles lost five of their last six games. In Week 17, after a devastating home loss to the Arizona Cardinals, the Eagles lost control of their own destiny for the NFC East division title. In Week 18, after the Cowboys' victory against the Commanders and their own loss to the Giants, the Eagles were locked into the #5 seed. Even in victory, the Eagles had problems with a poor defense the entire season, which was ranked 26th out of 32; In fact, the Eagles defense allowed the third most points of any team in the league, with over 428.

The Eagles' late season woes continued into the playoffs, in which they were eliminated in the Wild Card round by the NFC South champion Tampa Bay Buccaneers in a 32–9 loss. This late-season collapse is considered by many to be one of the most shocking in NFL history. The Eagles promptly fired offensive coordinator Brian Johnson and defensive coordinators Sean Desai and Matt Patricia within a week of their playoff exit. In the subsequent offseason, on March 4, 2024, center Jason Kelce retired after spending his entire 13-year career with the Eagles. On March 10, defensive tackle Fletcher Cox would also retire after spending 12 seasons with the team. Despite the disappointing season, highlights included a 21–17 primetime win over the defending and eventual repeat Super Bowl champion Kansas City Chiefs at Arrowhead Stadium in Week 11. This was the Eagles' first win against the Chiefs since 2009, and their first-ever win against former longtime head coach Andy Reid.

This season would mark the first season since 2010 that the Eagles wore Kelly green uniforms and the first time since 1995 that they would be featured multiple times in a season.

The Philadelphia Eagles drew an average home attendance of 69,878 in 8 home games in the 2023 NFL season.

== Roster changes ==
=== Free agents ===
Position	Player	Tag	2023 team	Notes
CB	James Bradberry	UFA	Philadelphia Eagles	3 years, $38 million
DT	Fletcher Cox	UFA	Philadelphia Eagles	1 year, $10 million
OT	Andre Dillard	UFA	Tennessee Titans	3 years, $29 million
LB	T. J. Edwards	UFA	Chicago Bears	3 years, $19.5 million
S	Marcus Epps	UFA	Las Vegas Raiders	2 years, $12 million
S	C. J. Gardner-Johnson	UFA	Detroit Lions	1 year, $8 million
DE	Brandon Graham	UFA	Philadelphia Eagles	1 year, $6 million
DT	Javon Hargrave	UFA	San Francisco 49ers	4 years, $84 million
TE	Tyree Jackson	ERFA	Philadelphia Eagles	1 year
DT	Linval Joseph	UFA	Buffalo Bills	1 year, $3.72 million
C	Jason Kelce	UFA	Philadelphia Eagles	1 year, $14.25 million
P	Brett Kern	UFA	Retired	
QB	Gardner Minshew	UFA	Indianapolis Colts	1 year, $3.5 million
WR	Zach Pascal	UFA	Arizona Cardinals	2 years, $4.5 million
DE	Robert Quinn	UFA		
RB	Miles Sanders	UFA	Carolina Panthers	4 years, $25 million
RB	Boston Scott	UFA	Philadelphia Eagles	1 year, $2 million
OG	Isaac Seumalo	UFA	Pittsburgh Steelers	3 years, $24 million
DT	Ndamukong Suh	UFA		
LB	Kyzir White	UFA	Arizona Cardinals	2 years, $11 million

=== Signings ===
Position	Player	Tag	2022 team	Date signed	Notes
OT	Brett Toth	UFA	Philadelphia Eagles	March 14	1 year
RB	Rashaad Penny	UFA	Seattle Seahawks	March 15	1 year, $1.35 million
CB	Greedy Williams	UFA	Cleveland Browns	March 18	1 year, $1.29 million
QB	Marcus Mariota	UFA	Atlanta Falcons	March 20	1 year, $5 million
S	Justin Evans	UFA	New Orleans Saints	March 21	1 year, $1.56 million
LB	Nicholas Morrow	UFA	Chicago Bears	March 21	1 year, $1.02 million
S	Terrell Edmunds	UFA	Pittsburgh Steelers	March 24	1 year, $2 million
DT	Kentavius Street	UFA	New Orleans Saints	March 30	1 year, $1.08 million
WR	Olamide Zaccheaus	UFA	Atlanta Falcons	April 20	1 year
TE	Dan Arnold	UFA	Jacksonville Jaguars	May 5	1 year
WR	Charleston Rambo	UFA	Orlando Guardians	May 16	1 year
OT	Dennis Kelly	UFA	Indianapolis Colts	July 25	1 year
WR	Deon Cain	UFA	Birmingham Stallions	July 26	1 year
OG	Josh Andrews	UFA	New Orleans Saints	August 6	1 year
LB	Zach Cunningham	UFA	Tennessee Titans	August 6	1 year
LB	Myles Jack	UFA	Pittsburgh Steelers	August 6	1 year
DT	Olive Sagapolu	UFA	Pittsburgh Maulers	August 14	1 year, $1.08 million
LB	Quinton Bell	UFA	Atlanta Falcons	August 19	1 year
LB	Tyreek Maddox-Williams	UFA	Los Angeles Chargers	August 19	1 year
DT	Marvin Wilson	UFA	Philadelphia Eagles	August 19	1 year
WR	Freddie Swain	UFA	Miami Dolphins	August 23	1 year
OT	Fred Johnson	UFA	Philadelphia Eagles	August 24	2 years
CB	Isaiah Rodgers	UFA	Indianapolis Colts	August 28	1 year
CB	Josiah Scott	UFA	Pittsburgh Steelers	October 18	1 year
LB	Shaquille Leonard	UFA	Indianapolis Colts	December 4	1 year, $1.5 million

=== Departures ===
Position	Player	2023 team	Date	Reason
OT	Brett Toth	Philadelphia Eagles	March 9	Released
S	Marquise Blair		April 24	Released
S	Andre Chachere	Arizona Cardinals	May 8	Released
OT	Jarrid Williams	Pittsburgh Steelers	May 16	Released
DE	Matt Leo	N/A	July 25	Retired
TE	Dalton Keene	Houston Texans	July 26	Released
LB	Davion Taylor	Chicago Bears	August 6	Released
OT	Chim Okorafor	Minnesota Vikings	August 8	Released
OT	Trevor Reid	Atlanta Falcons	August 8	Released
CB	Greedy Williams		August 19	Released
P	Ty Zentner	Houston Texans	August 19	Released
LB	Myles Jack	Pittsburgh Steelers	August 20	Retired/Released
OT	Fred Johnson	Philadelphia Eagles	August 23	Released
DT	Noah Elliss	Philadelphia Eagles	August 28	Released
WR	Tyrie Cleveland	Indianapolis Colts	August 29	Released
WR	Charleston Rambo		September 12	Released
RB	Trey Sermon	Indianapolis Colts	September 15	Released
CB	Mario Goodrich	Philadelphia Eagles	October 18	Released
DE	Derek Barnett	Houston Texans	November 24	Released
CB	Josiah Scott	Philadelphia Eagles	November 28	Released
LB	Christian Elliss	New England Patriots	December 6	Released

=== Trades ===
April 29	To Philadelphia Eagles: RB D'Andre Swift; 2023 7th round pick #249	To Detroit Lions: 2023 7th round pick #219; 2025 4th round pick
August 29	To Philadelphia Eagles: TE Albert Okwuegbunam; 2025 7th round pick	To Denver Broncos: 2025 6th round pick
October 23	To Philadelphia Eagles: S Kevin Byard	To Tennessee Titans: S Terrell Edmunds; 2024 5th round pick #146 (from Minnesota); 2024 6th round pick #182
October 30	To Philadelphia Eagles: 2024 conditional 6th round pick	To Atlanta Falcons: DT Kentavius Street; 2025 7th round pick

== Draft ==
2023 Philadelphia Eagles draft selections
Round	Selection	Player	Position	College	Note
1	9	Jalen Carter	DT	Georgia	From Panthers via Bears (Note: The Eagles traded a first-round selection (10th overall) and a 2024 fourth-round selection to the Chicago Bears in exchange for a first-round selection (9th overall).)
1	10	Traded to the Chicago Bears			From Saints (Note: The Eagles traded two 2022 first-round selections and a 2022 sixth-round selection to the New Orleans Saints in exchange for a first-round selection (10th overall), a 2024 second-round selection, and 2022 first-, third- and seventh-round selections.)
1	30	Nolan Smith	OLB	Georgia	
2	62	Traded to the Houston Texans (Note: The Eagles traded a second-round selection (62nd overall) to Houston Texans in exchange for third-, sixth- and seventh-round selections (65th, 188th and 230th overall).)			
3	65	Tyler Steen	OT	Alabama	From Texans
3	66	Sydney Brown	S	Illinois	From Cardinals (Note: The Eagles traded a third-round selection (94th overall) and a 2024 fifth-round selection to the Arizona Cardinals in exchange for a third-round selection (66th overall). The trade settled Philadelphia's tampering complaint regarding Arizona hiring Eagles defensive coordinator Jonathan Gannon as their head coach.)
3	94	Traded to the Arizona Cardinals			
4	105	Kelee Ringo	CB	Georgia	From Cardinals via Texans (Note: The Eagles traded a 2024 third-round selection to the Houston Texans in exchange for a fourth-round selection (105th overall).)
4	133	Traded to the Chicago Bears (Note: The Eagles traded a fourth-round selection (133rd overall) to the Chicago Bears in exchange for DE Robert Quinn.)			
5	165	Traded to the New Orleans Saints (Note: The Eagles traded a fifth-round selection (165th overall) and a 2024 sixth-round pick to the New Orleans Saints in exchange for a 2025 seventh-round selection and S C. J. Gardner-Johnson.)			
6	188	Tanner McKee	QB	Stanford	From Saints via Texans
6	191	Traded to the Tampa Bay Buccaneers (Note: The Eagles traded a sixth-round selection (191st overall) to the Tampa Bay Buccaneers in exchange for a 2024 fifth-round selection.)			From Packers via Rams and Texans (Note: The Eagles traded two seventh-round selections (230th and 248th overall) to the Houston Texans in exchange for a sixth-round selection (191st overall).)
6	208	Traded to the Jacksonville Jaguars (Note: The Eagles traded a sixth-round selection (208th overall) and CB Jameson Houston to the Jacksonville Jaguars in exchange for CB Josiah Scott.)			
7	219	Traded to the Detroit Lions (Note: The Eagles traded a seventh-round selection (219th overall) and a 2025 fourth-round selection to the Detroit Lions in exchange for a seventh-round selection (249th overall) and RB D'Andre Swift.)			From Texans via Vikings (Note: The Eagles traded WR Jalen Reagor to the Minnesota Vikings in exchange for a seventh-round selection (219th overall) and a conditional 2024 fifth-round selection (that would have become a fourth-round selection if Reagor had 40 receptions, 500 receiving yards or 5 touchdowns in either 2022 or 2023).)
7	230	Traded to the Houston Texans			From Jets via Texans
7	248	Traded to the Houston Texans			
7	249	Moro Ojomo	DE	Texas	From Chiefs via Lions

2023 Philadelphia Eagles undrafted free agents
Name	Position	College	Ref.
Robert Cooper	DT	Florida State	
Mekhi Garner	CB	LSU	
Jadon Haselwood	WR	Arkansas	
Johnny King	WR	Southeast Missouri State	
Joseph Ngata	WR	Clemson	
Chim Okorafor	OT	Benedictine	
Trevor Reid	OT	Louisville	
Eli Ricks	CB	Alabama	
Brady Russell	TE	Colorado	
Caleb Sanders	DT	South Dakota State	
Ben VanSumeren	LB	Michigan State	
Ty Zentner	P	Kansas State	

Draft trades

== Staff ==
2023 Philadelphia Eagles staff
Front office: Chairman/CEO – Jeffrey Lurie; President – Don Smolenski; General manager/executive vice president – Howie Roseman; Assistant general manager – Alec Halaby; Assistant general manager – Jon Ferrari; Senior advisor to the general manager/chief security officer – Dom DiSandro; Director of football operations – Jeff Scott; Vice president of football administration – Jake Rosenberg; Vice president of football transactions and Strategic Planning – Bryce Johnston; Senior personnel director/advisor to the general manager – Matt Russell; Senior personnel director/advisor to the general manager – Dave Caldwell; Director of player development – Connor Barwin; Director of scouting – Brandon Hunt; Director of player personnel – Charles Walls; Director of player personnel – Alan Wolking; Director of college scouting – Phil Bhaya; Director of pro scouting – Max Gruder; Assistant director of pro scouting – Jeremy Gray; Senior director of college scouting – Anthony Patch; Assistant director of college scouting – Ryan Myers; Director of football analytics – James Gilman; Assistant director of football analytics – John Liu; Head coaches: Head coach – Nick Sirianni; Associate head coach/passing game coordinator – Kevin Patullo; Assistant head coach/running backs – Jemal Singleton; Offensive coaches: Offensive coordinator – Brian Johnson; Senior offensive assistant – Marcus Brady; Quarterbacks – Alex Tanney; Wide receivers – Aaron Moorehead; Tight ends – Jason Michael; Run game specialist/assistant tight ends – T. J. Paganetti; Run game coordinator/offensive line – Jeff Stoutland; Assistant offensive line – Roy Istvan; Offensive quality control – Eric Dickerson	Defensive coaches: Defensive coordinator – Sean Desai; Senior defensive assistant – Matt Patricia; Defensive line – Tracy Rocker; Defensive ends/outside linebackers – Jeremiah Washburn; Linebackers – D. J. Eliot; Assistant linebackers - Tyler Scudder; Defensive backs – D.K. McDonald; Assistant defensive backs – Taver Johnson; Nickelbacks – Ronell Williams; Defensive quality control – Mike DiAngelo; Special teams coaches: Special teams coordinator – Michael Clay; Assistant special teams coordinator – Joe Pannunzio; Special teams assistant – Tyler Brown; Strength and conditioning: Vice president of player performance – Ted Rath; Head strength and conditioning – Fernando Noriega

== Final roster ==
2023 Philadelphia Eagles roster
Quarterbacks (QB): 1 Jalen Hurts; 8 Marcus Mariota; 19 Tanner McKee; Running backs (RB): 14 Kenneth Gainwell; 23 Rashaad Penny; 35 Boston Scott; 0 D'Andre Swift; Wide receivers (WR): 11 A. J. Brown; 18 Britain Covey; 80 Julio Jones; 6 DeVonta Smith; 16 Quez Watkins; 13 Olamide Zaccheaus; Tight ends (TE): 81 Grant Calcaterra; 88 Dallas Goedert; 89 Jack Stoll	Offensive linemen (OL): 69 Landon Dickerson G; 63 Jack Driscoll T; 74 Fred Johnson T; 65 Lane Johnson T; 51 Cam Jurgens G; 62 Jason Kelce C; 68 Jordan Mailata T; 78 Sua Opeta G; 56 Tyler Steen G; Defensive linemen (DL): 98 Jalen Carter DT; 91 Fletcher Cox DT; 90 Jordan Davis DT; 55 Brandon Graham DE; 72 Moro Ojomo DT; 94 Josh Sweat DE; 95 Marlon Tuipulotu DT; 93 Milton Williams DT	Linebackers (LB): 52 Zach Cunningham OLB; 48 Patrick Johnson OLB; 53 Shaquille Leonard OLB; 41 Nicholas Morrow MLB; 7 Haason Reddick OLB; 3 Nolan Smith OLB; 57 Ben VanSumeren MLB; Defensive backs (DB): 32 Reed Blankenship FS; 24 James Bradberry CB; 21 Sydney Brown SS; 31 Kevin Byard SS; 28 Josh Jobe CB; 29 Avonte Maddox CB; 39 Eli Ricks CB; 22 Kelee Ringo CB; 33 Bradley Roby CB; 2 Darius Slay CB; Special teams (ST): 4 Jake Elliott K; 45 Rick Lovato LS; 10 Braden Mann P	Practice squad: 82 Devon Allen WR (PS/I); 59 Thomas Booker DT; 73 Le'Raven Clark T; 61 Noah Elliss DT; 43 Mekhi Garner CB; 37 Mario Goodrich CB; 87 Griffin Hebert WR; 75 Tarron Jackson DE; 36 Tristin McCollum SS; 86 Joseph Ngata WR; 38 Lew Nichols III RB; 34 Josiah Scott CB; 47 Brandon Smith MLB; 79 Lecitus Smith G; 83 Noah Togiai TE; 64 Brett Toth G; 84 Greg Ward WR; Reserve: 54 Shaun Bradley OLB (IR); 17 Nakobe Dean MLB (IR); 30 Justin Evans FS (IR); 66 Roderick Johnson T (IR); 27 Zech McPhearson CB (IR); 85 Albert Okwuegbunam TE (IR); -- Isaiah Rodgers CB (Susp.); Rookies in italics

== Preseason ==
Week	Date	Opponent	Result	Record	Venue	Recap
1	August 12	at Baltimore Ravens	L 19–20	0–1	M&T Bank Stadium	Recap
2	August 17	Cleveland Browns	T 18–18	0–1–1	Lincoln Financial Field	Recap
3	August 24	Indianapolis Colts	L 13–27	0–2–1	Lincoln Financial Field	Recap

== Regular season ==
=== Schedule ===
Week	Date	Opponent	Result	Record	Venue	Recap
1	September 10	at New England Patriots	**W** 25–20	1–0	Gillette Stadium	Recap
2	September 14	Minnesota Vikings	**W** 34–28	2–0	Lincoln Financial Field	Recap
3	September 25	at Tampa Bay Buccaneers	**W** 25–11	3–0	Raymond James Stadium	Recap
4	October 1	**Washington Commanders**	**W** 34–31 (OT)	4–0	Lincoln Financial Field	Recap
5	October 8	at Los Angeles Rams	**W** 23–14	5–0	SoFi Stadium	Recap
6	October 15	at New York Jets	**L** 14–20	5–1	MetLife Stadium	Recap
7	October 22	Miami Dolphins	**W** 31–17	6–1	Lincoln Financial Field	Recap
8	October 29	at **Washington Commanders**	**W** 38–31	7–1	FedExField	Recap
9	November 5	**Dallas Cowboys**	**W** 28–23	8–1	Lincoln Financial Field	Recap
10	Bye					
11	November 20	at Kansas City Chiefs	**W** 21–17	9–1	Arrowhead Stadium	Recap
12	November 26	Buffalo Bills	**W** 37–34 (OT)	10–1	Lincoln Financial Field	Recap
13	December 3	San Francisco 49ers	**L** 19–42	10–2	Lincoln Financial Field	Recap
14	December 10	at **Dallas Cowboys**	**L** 13–33	10–3	AT&T Stadium	Recap
15	December 18	at Seattle Seahawks	**L** 17–20	10–4	Lumen Field	Recap
16	December 25	**New York Giants**	**W** 33–25	11–4	Lincoln Financial Field	Recap
17	December 31	Arizona Cardinals	**L** 31–35	11–5	Lincoln Financial Field	Recap
18	January 7	at **New York Giants**	**L** 10–27	11–6	MetLife Stadium	Recap

Note: Intra-division opponents are in bold text.

=== Game summaries ===
==== Week 1: at New England Patriots ====
Week 1: Philadelphia Eagles at New England Patriots – Game summary

Quarter	1	2	3	4	Total
**Eagles**	16	0	3	6	**25**
Patriots	0	14	0	6	**20**

at Gillette Stadium, Foxborough, Massachusetts

- Date: September 10
- Game time: 4:25 p.m. EDT
- Game weather: Rain, 71 °F (22 °C)
- Game attendance: 64,628
- Referee: Shawn Hochuli
- TV announcers (CBS): Jim Nantz, Tony Romo and Tracy Wolfson
- Recap, Game Book

Game information

**First quarter**

- PHI – Jake Elliott 32-yard field goal, 7:42. Eagles 3–0. **Drive: 14 plays, 61 yards, 7:18.**
- PHI – Darius Slay 70-yard interception return (Jake Elliott kick), 4:56. Eagles 10–0.
- PHI – DeVonta Smith 5-yard pass from Jalen Hurts (kick failed), 2:39. Eagles 16–0. **Drive: 4 plays, 26 yards, 2:09.**

**Second quarter**

- NE – Hunter Henry 9-yard pass from Mac Jones (Chad Ryland kick), 4:34. Eagles 16–7. **Drive: 10 plays, 71 yards, 4:48.**
- NE – Kendrick Bourne 19-yard pass from Mac Jones (Chad Ryland kick), 0:25. Eagles 16–14. **Drive: 6 plays, 63 yards, 2:08.**

**Third quarter**

- PHI – Jake Elliott 56-yard field goal, 8:48. Eagles 19–14. **Drive: 10 plays, 33 yards, 4:55.**

**Fourth quarter**

- PHI – Jake Elliott 48-yard field goal, 13:21. Eagles 22–14. **Drive: 11 plays, 50 yards, 4:22.**
- PHI – Jake Elliott 51-yard field goal, 5:33. Eagles 25–14. **Drive: 7 plays, 50 yards, 3:59.**
- NE – Kendrick Bourne 11-yard pass from Mac Jones (pass failed), 3:37. Eagles 25–20. **Drive: 6 plays, 75 yards, 1:56.**

**Top passers**

- PHI – Jalen Hurts – 22/33, 170 yards, TD
- NE – Mac Jones – 35/54, 316 yards, 3 TD, INT

**Top rushers**

- PHI – Kenneth Gainwell – 14 rushes, 54 yards
- NE – Ezekiel Elliott – 7 rushes, 29 yards

**Top receivers**

- PHI – A. J. Brown – 7 receptions, 79 yards
- NE – Kendrick Bourne – 6 receptions, 64 yards, 2 TD

On a rainy opening day, the Eagles would come out of the gates strong with 16 unanswered points which included a 32-yard field goal from Jake Elliott, a Darius Slay 70 yard pick 6 and a 5-yard touchdown pass from Jalen Hurts to DeVonta Smith. New England would rally back with a pair of touchdown passes from Mac Jones to Hunter Henry and Kendrick Bourne. In the second half, Jake Elliott would kick 3 field goals from 56, 48, and 51 yards. The Patriots would march down the field late in the 4th quarter and score a touchdown pass from Jones to Bourne again making the score 25–20. A Jalen Hurts fumble and turnover on downs gave the Patriots 2 more shots for the go-ahead touchdown. On 4th-and-11 with 24 seconds left in the game, Jones appeared to complete a pass to Kayshon Boutte to set up 1st-and-goal for the Patriots at the Eagle's 7-yard line before Boutte was forced out of bounds by Josh Jobe. However, the pass was ruled incomplete after the replay showed that Boutte did not get both feet inbounds after catching the ball, therefore resulting in a turnover on downs, and the Eagles would win their season opener for the third straight year (all on the road) and their seventh in the last eight seasons.

==== Week 2: vs. Minnesota Vikings ====
Week 2: Minnesota Vikings at Philadelphia Eagles – Game summary

Quarter	1	2	3	4	Total
Vikings	0	7	7	14	**28**
**Eagles**	3	10	14	7	**34**

at Lincoln Financial Field, Philadelphia, Pennsylvania

- Date: September 14
- Game time: 8:15 p.m. EDT
- Game weather: Clear, 72 °F (22 °C)
- Game attendance: 69,879
- Referee: Clay Martin
- TV announcers (WTXF/Prime Video): Al Michaels, Kirk Herbstreit and Kaylee Hartung
- Recap, Game Book

Game information

**First quarter**

- PHI – Jake Elliott 24-yard field goal, 9:48. Eagles 3–0. **Drive: 9 plays, 69 yards, 5:12.**

**Second quarter**

- MIN – T. J. Hockenson 5-yard pass from Kirk Cousins (Greg Joseph kick), 10:39. Vikings 7–3. **Drive: 9 plays, 55 yards, 5:03.**
- PHI – Jalen Hurts 1-yard rush (Jake Elliott kick), 2:44. Eagles 10–7. **Drive: 16 plays, 75 yards, 7:55.**
- PHI – Jake Elliott 61-yard field goal, 0:00. Eagles 13–7. **Drive: 6 plays, 37 yards, 0:34.**

**Third quarter**

- PHI – Jalen Hurts 1-yard rush (Jake Elliott kick), 13:53. Eagles 20–7. **Drive: 2 plays, 7 yards, 0:33.**
- PHI – DeVonta Smith 63-yard pass from Jalen Hurts (Jake Elliott kick), 10:54. Eagles 27–7. **Drive: 3 plays, 69 yards, 1:35.**
- MIN – Jordan Addison 62-yard pass from Kirk Cousins (Greg Joseph kick), 9:09. Eagles 27–14. **Drive: 5 plays, 75 yards, 1:45.**

**Fourth quarter**

- MIN – K. J. Osborn 10-yard pass from Kirk Cousins (Greg Joseph kick), 7:41. Eagles 27–21. **Drive: 9 plays, 86 yards, 3:38.**
- PHI – D'Andre Swift 2-yard rush (Jake Elliott kick), 4:13. Eagles 34–21. **Drive: 8 plays, 75 yards, 3:28.**
- MIN – T. J. Hockenson 5-yard pass from Kirk Cousins (Greg Joseph kick), 1:10. Eagles 34–28. **Drive: 10 plays, 75 yards, 3:03.**

**Top passers**

- MIN – Kirk Cousins – 31/43, 364 yards, 4 TD
- PHI – Jalen Hurts – 18/23, 193 yards, TD, INT

**Top rushers**

- MIN – Alexander Mattison – 8 rushes, 28 yards
- PHI – D'Andre Swift – 28 rushes, 175 yards, TD

**Top receivers**

- MIN – Justin Jefferson – 11 receptions, 159 yards
- PHI – DeVonta Smith – 4 receptions, 131 yards, TD

The Eagles would strike first on a 24-yard Jake Elliott field goal. In the second quarter, the Vikings would get on the board with a 5-yard touchdown pass from Kirk Cousins to T.J. Hockenson. The Eagles would punch back with a Jalen Hurts "tush push" 1-yard touchdown. The Vikings would march down the field with Cousins hitting a wide open Justin Jefferson. On the play, Jefferson was diving towards the pylon. However, in doing so, the ball would come loose from his hand prior to going over the plain and would go out of bounds in the endzone resulting in a touchback. Under a minute remaining, the Eagles would march down to set up Jake Elliott for a 61-yard field goal. It would tie as his longest career field goal made and put the Eagles up 13–7 at the half. On the opening second half drive, the Eagles would march down the field again and Jalen Hurts would score his second touchdown on the day with another "tush push." The Eagles would once again get the ball back on a Vikings turnover and Jalen Hurts would hit DeVonta Smith for a 63-yard touchdown putting the Eagles up 27–7. The Vikings would fight back on a pair of touchdowns from the Vikings making the score 27–21. The Eagles would rush their way down the field and would top it off with a 2-yard D'Andre Swift touchdown. Keeping things interesting, the Vikings would quickly march down field and score a touchdown of their own from Cousins to Hockenson making the score 34–28. The Vikings would get the ball back one more time in a Hail Mary effort, but would fall short. The game was noted on the 4 Vikings turnovers caused by the Eagles defense and the Eagles vicious rushing attack mainly coming from Swift who had 175 yards on the ground. The Eagles would come out 2-0 for the second straight year.

==== Week 3: at Tampa Bay Buccaneers ====
Week 3: Philadelphia Eagles at Tampa Bay Buccaneers – Game summary

Quarter	1	2	3	4	Total
**Eagles**	3	10	9	3	**25**
Buccaneers	0	3	0	8	**11**

at Raymond James Stadium, Tampa, Florida

- Date: September 25
- Game time: 7:15 p.m. EDT
- Game weather: Cloudy, 90 °F (32 °C)
- Game attendance: 65,426
- Referee: Adrian Hill
- TV announcers (ABC/ESPN+): Joe Buck, Troy Aikman and Lisa Salters
- Recap, Game Book

Game information

**First quarter**

- PHI – Jake Elliott 36-yard field goal, 3:05. Eagles 3–0. **Drive: 8 plays, 26 yards, 3:20.**

**Second quarter**

- TB – Chase McLaughlin 33-yard field goal, 8:33. Tied 3–3. **Drive: 13 plays, 69 yards, 6:09.**
- PHI – Olamide Zaccheaus 34-yard pass from Jalen Hurts (Jake Elliott kick), 3:32. Eagles 10–3. **Drive: 8 plays, 84 yards, 5:01.**
- PHI – Jake Elliott 38-yard field goal, 3:05. Eagles 13–3. **Drive: 5 plays, 16 yards, 0:24.**

**Third quarter**

- PHI – Jalen Hurts 1-yard run (Jake Elliott kick), 9:12. Eagles 20–3. **Drive: 13 plays, 75 yards, 5:48.**
- PHI – Rachaad White tackled in end zone by Nicholas Morrow for a safety, 3:40. Eagles 22–3.

**Fourth quarter**

- PHI – Jake Elliott 26-yard field goal, 13:28. Eagles 25–3. **Drive: 10 plays, 55 yards, 5:12.**
- TB – Mike Evans 1-yard pass from Baker Mayfield (Baker Mayfield–Chris Godwin pass), 9:22. Eagles 25–11. **Drive: 9 plays, 75 yards, 4:06.**

**Top passers**

- PHI – Jalen Hurts – 23/37, 277 yards, TD, 2 INT
- TB – Baker Mayfield – 15/25, 146 yards, TD, INT

**Top rushers**

- PHI – D'Andre Swift – 16 rushes, 130 yards
- TB – Rachaad White – 14 rushes, 38 yards

**Top receivers**

- PHI – A. J. Brown – 9 receptions, 131 yards
- TB – Mike Evans – 5 receptions, 60 yards, TD

The Eagles thoroughly dominated the Buccaneers, holding a 25–3 lead during the 4th quarter. While Tampa Bay did eventually respond with a touchdown and a 2-point conversion, Philadelphia would not give the ball back. The Eagles defeated the Buccaneers for the first time since 2013, snapping a 4-game losing streak.

==== Week 4: vs. Washington Commanders ====
Week 4: Washington Commanders at Philadelphia Eagles – Game summary

Quarter	1	2	3	4	OT	Total
Commanders	7	10	0	14	0	**31**
**Eagles**	7	3	11	10	3	**34**

at Lincoln Financial Field, Philadelphia, Pennsylvania

- Date: October 1
- Game time: 1:00 p.m. EDT
- Game weather: 76 °F (24 °C)
- Game attendance: 69,879
- Referee: Ronald Torbert
- TV announcers (Fox): Joe Davis, Daryl Johnston and Pam Oliver
- Recap, Game Book

Game information

**First quarter**

- WAS – Curtis Samuel 1-yard run (Joey Slye kick), 7:52. Commanders 7–0. **Drive: 14 plays, 75 yards, 7:08.**
- PHI – D'Andre Swift 5-yard run (Jake Elliott kick), 1:17. Tied 7–7. **Drive: 12 plays, 75 yards, 6:35.**

**Second quarter**

- WAS – Terry McLaurin fumble recovery in the end zone (Joey Slye kick), 12:56. Commanders 14–7. **Drive: 7 plays, 75 yards, 3:21.**
- WAS – Joey Slye 27-yard field goal, 1:39. Commanders 17–7. **Drive: 11 plays, 65 yards, 4:27.**
- PHI – Jake Elliott 41-yard field goal, 0:00. Commanders 17–10. **Drive: 8 plays, 52 yards, 1:39.**

**Third quarter**

- PHI – Jake Elliott 47-yard field goal, 11:38. Commanders 17–13. **Drive: 9 plays, 45 yards, 3:22.**
- PHI – A. J. Brown 59-yard pass from Jalen Hurts (Kenneth Gainwell run), 7:11. Eagles 21–17. **Drive: 4 plays, 74 yards, 2:13.**

**Fourth quarter**

- PHI – Jake Elliott 36-yard field goal, 14:15. Eagles 24–17. **Drive: 10 plays, 51 yards, 4:59.**
- WAS – Brian Robinson Jr. 15-yard run (Joey Slye kick), 8:01. Tied 24–24. **Drive: 11 plays, 75 yards, 6:14.**
- PHI – A. J. Brown 28-yard pass from Jalen Hurts (Jake Elliott kick), 1:43. Eagles 31–24. **Drive: 6 plays, 57 yards, 1:37.**
- WAS - Jahan Dotson 10-yard pass from Sam Howell (Joey Slye kick), 0:00. Tied 31–31. **Drive: 10 plays, 64 yards, 1:43.**

**Overtime**

- PHI – Jake Elliott 54-yard field goal, 3:58. Eagles 34–31. **Drive: 10 plays, 23 yards, 4:28.**

**Top passers**

- WAS – Sam Howell – 29/41, 290 yards, TD
- PHI – Jalen Hurts – 25/37, 319 yards, 2 TD

**Top rushers**

- WAS – Brian Robinson Jr. – 14 rushes, 45 yards, TD
- PHI – D'Andre Swift – 14 rushes, 56 yards, TD

**Top receivers**

- WAS – Terry McLaurin – 8 receptions, 86 yards
- PHI – A. J. Brown – 9 receptions, 175 yards, 2 TD

In a back-and-forth thriller that featured many lead changes in the fourth quarter, the Eagles defeated their division rival in overtime. This win, along with a Miami Dolphins loss to the Buffalo Bills, allowed Philadelphia to become one of only two unbeaten teams remaining, the other being the San Francisco 49ers, who defeated the Arizona Cardinals later that day.

==== Week 5: at Los Angeles Rams ====
Week 5: Philadelphia Eagles at Los Angeles Rams – Game summary

Quarter	1	2	3	4	Total
**Eagles**	7	10	0	6	**23**
Rams	7	7	0	0	**14**

at SoFi Stadium, Inglewood, California

- Date: October 8
- Game time: 4:05 p.m. EDT/1:05 p.m. PDT
- Game weather: Sunny, 71 °F (22 °C) (retractable roof open)
- Game attendance: 74,935
- Referee: Bill Vinovich
- TV announcers (Fox): Kevin Burkhardt, Greg Olsen, Erin Andrews and Tom Rinaldi
- Recap, Game Book

Game information

**First quarter**

- PHI – Dallas Goedert 6-yard pass from Jalen Hurts (Jake Elliott kick), 8:37. Eagles 7–0. **Drive: 12 plays, 75 yards, 6:23.**
- LAR – Tutu Atwell 3-yard pass from Matthew Stafford (Brett Maher kick), 2:01. Tied 7–7. **Drive: 14 plays, 75 yards, 6:36.**

**Second quarter**

- PHI – Jake Elliott 34-yard field goal, 2:15. Eagles 10–7. **Drive: 15 plays, 56 yards, 8:24.**
- LAR – Puka Nacua 22-yard pass from Matthew Stafford (Brett Maher kick), 0:32. Rams 14–10. **Drive: 6 plays, 75 yards, 1:43.**
- PHI – Jalen Hurts 1-yard run (Jake Elliott kick), 0:00. Eagles 17–14. **Drive: 4 plays, 75 yards, 0:32.**

**Third quarter**

- No scoring plays.

**Fourth quarter**

- PHI – Jake Elliott 26-yard field goal, 12:29. Eagles 20–14. **Drive: 17 plays, 83 yards, 8:09.**
- PHI – Jake Elliott 26-yard field goal, 4:06. Eagles 23–14. **Drive: 10 plays, 72 yards, 5:49.**

**Top passers**

- PHI – Jalen Hurts – 25/38, 303 yards, TD, INT
- LAR – Matthew Stafford – 21/37, 222 yards, 2 TD

**Top rushers**

- PHI – Jalen Hurts – 15 rushes, 72 yards, TD
- LAR – Kyren Williams – 14 rushes, 53 yards

**Top receivers**

- PHI – A. J. Brown – 6 receptions, 127 yards
- LAR – Cooper Kupp – 8 receptions, 118 yards

Although the Rams took a 14–10 lead with 32 seconds remaining in the first half, the Eagles responded with a touchdown drive capped by a 1-yard Jalen Hurts run to take a 17–14 lead at halftime. The Rams were shut out in the second half as the Eagles extended their lead with two fourth-quarter field goals to secure the win.

==== Week 6: at New York Jets ====
Week 6: Philadelphia Eagles at New York Jets – Game summary

Quarter	1	2	3	4	Total
Eagles	7	7	0	0	**14**
**Jets**	0	9	3	8	**20**

at MetLife Stadium, East Rutherford, New Jersey

- Date: October 15
- Game time: 4:25 p.m. EDT
- Game weather: Partly cloudy, 59 °F (15 °C)
- Game attendance: 83,068
- Referee: Scott Novak
- TV announcers (Fox): Kevin Kugler, Mark Sanchez and Laura Okmin
- Recap, Game Book

Game information

**First quarter**

- PHI – Jalen Hurts 3-yard run (Jake Elliott kick), 3:04. Eagles 7–0. **Drive: 19 plays, 91 yards, 9:47.**

**Second quarter**

- NYJ – Greg Zuerlein 43-yard field goal, 13:12. Eagles 7–3. **Drive: 11 plays, 50 yards, 4:52.**
- PHI – D'Andre Swift 9-yard pass from Jalen Hurts (Jake Elliott kick), 5:32. Eagles 14–3. **Drive: 6 plays, 64 yards, 2:53.**
- NYJ – Greg Zuerlein 42-yard field goal, 2:30. Eagles 14–6. **Drive: 8 plays, 51 yards, 3:02.**
- NYJ – Greg Zuerlein 35-yard field goal, 0:00. Eagles 14–9. **Drive: 8 plays, 34 yards, 1:40.**

**Third quarter**

- NYJ – Greg Zuerlein 38-yard field goal, 0:00. Eagles 14–12. **Drive: 10 plays, 16 yards, 4:45.**

**Fourth quarter**

- NYJ – Breece Hall 8-yard run (Zach Wilson–Randall Cobb pass), 1:46. Jets 20–14. **Drive: 1 play, 8 yards, 0:04.**

**Top passers**

- PHI – Jalen Hurts – 28/45, 280 yards, TD, 3 INT
- NYJ – Zach Wilson – 19/33, 186 yards

**Top rushers**

- PHI – Jalen Hurts – 8 rushes, 47 yards, TD
- NYJ – Breece Hall – 12 rushes, 39 yards, TD

**Top receivers**

- PHI – A. J. Brown – 7 receptions, 131 yards
- NYJ – Garrett Wilson – 8 receptions, 90 yards

The Eagles entered their Week 6 matchup with the New York Jets as the lone remaining undefeated team in the league, thanks to the San Francisco 49ers' loss to the Cleveland Browns just moments after the kickoff. Philadelphia raced out to a 14–3 lead in the second quarter, but the game would quickly fall apart for the Eagles from there as the Jets continued to chip away at the lead over the remainder of the game. With their lead down to 14–12 at the two-minute warning, Jalen Hurts was picked off by Tony Adams, and gave the Jets an opportunity to win the game. Breece Hall scored the go-ahead touchdown for New York on the very next play, and Philadelphia failed to respond on their final drive, allowing the Jets to run the clock out. The Eagles fell to 5–1 on the season with the 20–14 upset loss. It also marked Philadelphia's first ever loss to the New York Jets in thirteen regular-season meetings.

==== Week 7: vs. Miami Dolphins ====
Week 7: Miami Dolphins at Philadelphia Eagles – Game summary

Quarter	1	2	3	4	Total
Dolphins	3	7	7	0	**17**
**Eagles**	3	14	7	7	**31**

at Lincoln Financial Field, Philadelphia, Pennsylvania

- Date: October 22
- Game time: 8:20 p.m. EDT
- Game weather: Partly cloudy, 55 °F (13 °C)
- Game attendance: 69,879
- Referee: Brad Allen
- TV announcers (NBC): Mike Tirico, Cris Collinsworth and Melissa Stark
- Recap, Game Book

Game information

**First quarter**

- PHI – Jake Elliott 24-yard field goal, 7:54. Eagles 3–0. **Drive: 12 plays, 71 yards, 7:06.**
- MIA – Jason Sanders 40-yard field goal, 0:59. Tied 3–3. **Drive: 7 plays, 1 yard, 3:25.**

**Second quarter**

- PHI – Dallas Goedert 19-yard pass from Jalen Hurts (Jake Elliott kick), 11:25. Eagles 10–3. **Drive: 9 plays, 61 yards, 4:34.**
- PHI – Jalen Hurts 1-yard run (Jake Elliott kick), 3:10. Eagles 17–3. **Drive: 12 plays, 80 yards, 6:49.**
- MIA – Tyreek Hill 27-yard pass from Tua Tagovailoa (Jason Sanders kick), 0:39. Eagles 17–10. **Drive: 8 plays, 72 yards, 2:31.**

**Third quarter**

- MIA – Jerome Baker 22-yard interception return (Jason Sanders kick), 4:02. Tied 17–17.
- PHI – A. J. Brown 14-yard pass from Jalen Hurts (Jake Elliott kick), 0:15. Eagles 24–17. **Drive: 8 plays, 75 yards, 3:47.**

**Fourth quarter**

- PHI – Kenneth Gainwell 3-yard run (Jake Elliott kick), 4:46. Eagles 31–17. **Drive: 13 plays, 83 yards, 6:35.**

**Top passers**

- MIA – Tua Tagovailoa – 23/32, 216 yards, TD, INT
- PHI – Jalen Hurts – 23/31, 279 yards, 2 TD, INT

**Top rushers**

- MIA – Raheem Mostert – 9 rushes, 45 yards
- PHI – D'Andre Swift – 15 rushes, 62 yards

**Top receivers**

- MIA – Tyreek Hill – 11 receptions, 88 yards, TD
- PHI – A. J. Brown – 10 receptions, 137 yards, TD

Following their first-ever loss to the New York Jets, the Eagles returned to Lincoln Financial Field to face the AFC East-leading Miami Dolphins. Philadelphia wore its Kelly Green alternate uniforms for the first time since 2010. After trading field goals with the Dolphins in the first quarter, the Eagles would jump out to a 17–3 lead on a Dallas Goedert touchdown reception, followed by a Jalen Hurts quarterback sneak. Tyreek Hill would close the gap to seven points before halftime with a 27-yard touchdown reception. The teams traded punts to start the second half, before the Eagles forced a turnover on downs on a controversial play where James Bradberry appeared to grab the face mask of Cedrick Wilson Jr., but no penalty was called. A game-tying 22-yard pick six by Jerome Baker almost immediately after the controversial call seemed to turn the momentum in Miami's favor. However, Baker's pick six proved to be the last Dolphins score, as the Eagles took control of the ball for the rest of the game. On the very next possession, A. J. Brown scored on a 14-yard reception, and Kenneth Gainwell ran 3 yards for the game-clinching touchdown in the fourth quarter. With the 31–17 win, the Eagles improved to 6–1 on the season, and became the top team in the conference when the San Francisco 49ers lost to the Minnesota Vikings the following night.

==== Week 8: at Washington Commanders ====
Week 8: Philadelphia Eagles at Washington Commanders – Game summary

Quarter	1	2	3	4	Total
**Eagles**	3	7	7	21	**38**
Commanders	7	10	0	14	**31**

at FedExField, Landover, Maryland

- Date: October 29
- Game time: 1:00 p.m. EDT
- Game weather: Cloudy, 69 °F (21 °C)
- Game attendance: 64,653
- Referee: Carl Cheffers
- TV announcers (Fox): Chris Myers, Mark Schlereth and Kristina Pink
- Recap, Game Book

Game information

**First quarter**

- WAS – Terry McLaurin 26-yard pass from Sam Howell (Joey Slye kick), 7:13. Commanders 7–0. **Drive: 3 plays, 62 yard, 0:54.**
- PHI – Jake Elliott 51-yard field goal, 2:11. Commanders 7–3. **Drive: 11 plays, 42 yards, 5:02.**

**Second quarter**

- WAS – Jahan Dotson 21-yard pass from Sam Howell (Joey Slye kick), 12:40. Commanders 14–3. **Drive: 9 plays, 75 yard, 4:31.**
- PHI – A. J. Brown 16-yard pass from Jalen Hurts (Jake Elliott kick), 0:34. Commanders 14–10. **Drive: 7 plays, 65 yards, 1:14.**
- WAS – Joey Slye 61-yard field goal, 0:01. Commanders 17–10. **Drive: 5 plays, 32 yards, 0:33.**

**Third quarter**

- PHI – A. J. Brown 25-yard pass from Jalen Hurts (Jake Elliott kick), 4:17. Tied 17–17. **Drive: 7 plays, 51 yards, 3:30.**

**Fourth quarter**

- WAS – Logan Thomas 7-yard pass from Sam Howell (Joey Slye kick), 12:03. Commanders 24–17. **Drive: 14 plays, 75 yards, 7:14.**
- PHI – DeVonta Smith 38-yard pass from Jalen Hurts (Jake Elliott kick), 8:47. Tied 24–24. **Drive: 7 plays, 75 yards, 3:16.**
- PHI – Julio Jones 8-yard pass from Jalen Hurts (Jake Elliott kick), 7:17. Eagles 31–24. **Drive: 2 plays, 7 yards, 0:45.**
- PHI – D'Andre Swift 7-yard run (Jake Elliott kick), 1:50. Eagles 38–24. **Drive: 3 plays, 16 yards, 0:23.**
- WAS – Jamison Crowder 26-yard pass from Sam Howell (Joey Slye kick), 1:01. Eagles 38–31. **Drive: 4 plays, 72 yards, 0:49.**

**Top passers**

- PHI – Jalen Hurts – 29/38, 319 yards, 4 TD
- WAS – Sam Howell – 39/52, 397 yards, 4 TD, INT

**Top rushers**

- PHI – D'Andre Swift – 16 rushes, 57 yards, TD
- WAS – Brian Robinson Jr. – 10 rushes, 59 yards

**Top receivers**

- PHI – A. J. Brown – 8 receptions, 130 yards, 2 TD
- WAS – Jahan Dotson – 8 receptions, 108 yards, TD

In an offense-heavy game between the two teams, the Commanders jumped out to a 14–3 lead and were up 17–10 at halftime due to a 61-yard field goal as the half expired. However, Philadelphia scored three consecutive touchdowns in the fourth quarter to take a 38–24 lead. While Washington was able to cut the deficit to 38–31, their ensuing onside kick was recovered by Philadelphia, preserving the Eagles' win.

==== Week 9: vs. Dallas Cowboys ====
Week 9: Dallas Cowboys at Philadelphia Eagles – Game summary

Quarter	1	2	3	4	Total
Cowboys	7	10	0	6	**23**
**Eagles**	7	7	14	0	**28**

at Lincoln Financial Field, Philadelphia, Pennsylvania

- Date: November 5
- Game time: 4:25 p.m. EST
- Game weather: Clear, 64 °F (18 °C)
- Game attendance: 69,876
- Referee: Tra Blake
- TV announcers (Fox): Kevin Burkhardt, Greg Olsen, Erin Andrews and Tom Rinaldi
- Recap, Game Book

Game information

**First quarter**

- PHI – Kenneth Gainwell 12-yard run (Jake Elliott kick), 5:46. Eagles 7–0. **Drive: 13 plays, 77 yards, 7:51.**
- DAL – Jake Ferguson 4-yard pass from Dak Prescott (Brandon Aubrey kick), 1:37. Tied 7–7. **Drive: 8 plays, 53 yards, 4:09.**

**Second quarter**

- DAL – KaVontae Turpin 5-yard pass from Dak Prescott (Brandon Aubrey kick), 11:16. Cowboys 14–7. **Drive: 9 plays, 82 yards, 3:49.**
- PHI – Jalen Hurts 1-yard run (Jake Elliott kick), 5:09. Tied 14–14. **Drive: 11 plays, 60 yards, 6:07.**
- DAL – Brandon Aubrey 51-yard field goal, 1:15. Cowboys 17–14. **Drive: 9 plays, 42 yards, 3:54.**

**Third quarter**

- PHI – DeVonta Smith 29-yard pass from Jalen Hurts (Jake Elliott kick), 11:23. Eagles 21–17. **Drive: 6 plays, 60 yards, 3:37.**
- PHI – A. J. Brown 4-yard pass from Jalen Hurts (Jake Elliott kick), 1:13. Eagles 28–17. **Drive: 11 plays, 87 yards, 6:18.**

**Fourth quarter**

- DAL – Jalen Tolbert 7-yard pass from Dak Prescott (run failed), 6:23. Eagles 28–23. **Drive: 5 plays, 52 yards, 2:13.**

**Top passers**

- DAL – Dak Prescott – 29/44, 374 yards, 3 TD
- PHI – Jalen Hurts – 17/23, 207 yards, 2 TD

**Top rushers**

- DAL – Tony Pollard – 12 rushes, 51 yards
- PHI – D'Andre Swift – 18 rushes, 43 yards

**Top receivers**

- DAL – CeeDee Lamb – 11 receptions, 191 yards
- PHI – A. J. Brown – 7 receptions, 66 yards, TD

Despite committing multiple mistakes in the game's closing minutes, the Eagles staved off a late Cowboys rally to preserve a 28–23 win. The Eagles narrowly escaped with the victory when Dak Prescott completed a pass to CeeDee Lamb, who was tackled by Darius Slay four yards short of the end zone as time expired. Philadelphia improved to 8–1 for the second consecutive year with the win, and earned their first victory over a Dak Prescott led Cowboys team for the first time since 2019.

==== Week 11: at Kansas City Chiefs ====
Week 11: Philadelphia Eagles at Kansas City Chiefs – Game summary

Quarter	1	2	3	4	Total
**Eagles**	7	0	7	7	**21**
Chiefs	7	10	0	0	**17**

at Arrowhead Stadium, Kansas City, Missouri

- Date: November 20
- Game time: 8:15 p.m. EST/7:15 p.m. CST
- Game weather: 45 °F (7 °C)
- Game attendance: 73,754
- Referee: Shawn Smith
- TV announcers (ESPN/ABC/ESPN+): Joe Buck, Troy Aikman, Lisa Salters and Laura Rutledge
- Recap, Game Book

Game information

**First quarter**

- KC – Justin Watson 3-yard pass from Patrick Mahomes (Harrison Butker kick), 5:34. Chiefs 7–0. **Drive: 10 plays, 80 yards, 5:43.**
- PHI – D'Andre Swift 4-yard run (Jake Elliott kick), 0:31. Tied 7–7. **Drive: 9 plays, 75 yards, 5:03.**

**Second quarter**

- KC – Travis Kelce 4-yard pass from Patrick Mahomes (Harrison Butker kick), 1:45. Chiefs 14–7. **Drive: 7 plays, 45 yards, 2:04.**
- KC – Harrison Butker 43-yard field goal, 0:00. Chiefs 17–7. **Drive: 6 plays, 21 yards, 0:44.**

**Third quarter**

- PHI – Jalen Hurts 10-yard run (Jake Elliott kick), 4:05. Chiefs 17–14. **Drive: 7 plays, 61 yards, 2:53.**

**Fourth quarter**

- PHI – Jalen Hurts 1-yard run (Jake Elliott kick), 6:20. Eagles 21–17. **Drive: 7 plays, 80 yards, 2:36.**

**Top passers**

- PHI – Jalen Hurts – 14/22, 150 yards, INT
- KC – Patrick Mahomes – 24/43, 177 yards, 2 TD, INT

**Top rushers**

- PHI – D'Andre Swift – 12 rushes, 76 yards, TD
- KC – Isiah Pacheco – 19 rushes, 89 yards

**Top receivers**

- PHI – DeVonta Smith – 6 receptions, 99 yards
- KC – Justin Watson – 5 receptions, 53 yards, TD

In a rematch of Super Bowl LVII, the Chiefs took a 17–7 lead at halftime on touchdowns by Justin Watson and Travis Kelce and a field goal by Harrison Butker, while the only Eagles' scoring play of the first half was a touchdown by D'Andre Swift. However, the Eagles held the Chiefs scoreless in the second half and mounted a comeback. In the third quarter, Jalen Hurts rushed for a 10-yard touchdown to cut the Chiefs' lead to 17–14. In the fourth quarter, the Chiefs converted a 4th-and-1 in the Eagles red zone, but on the next play, Bradley Roby stripped the ball from Kelce and Nicholas Morrow recovered the fumble. Two possessions later, Hurts rushed for a 1-yard touchdown, giving the Eagles a 21–17 lead. On the Chiefs' final drive, Patrick Mahomes threw a long pass that was dropped by Marquez Valdes-Scantling, and on the next play, Mahomes was flagged for intentional grounding, setting up 4th-and-25 for the Chiefs. Mahomes' pass to Watson fell incomplete, turning the ball over on downs, and allowing the Eagles to run out the clock.

The Eagles improved to 9–1 with their first ever consecutive 9-1 starts in franchise history. This also marked the first time they ever defeated their old head coach, Andy Reid.

==== Week 12: vs. Buffalo Bills ====
Week 12: Buffalo Bills at Philadelphia Eagles – Game summary

Quarter	1	2	3	4	OT	Total
Bills	0	17	7	7	3	**34**
**Eagles**	7	0	7	17	6	**37**

at Lincoln Financial Field, Philadelphia, Pennsylvania

- Date: November 26
- Game time: 4:25 p.m. EST
- Game weather: Rain, 47 °F (8 °C)
- Game attendance: 69,879
- Referee: Shawn Hochuli
- TV announcers (CBS): Jim Nantz, Tony Romo and Tracy Wolfson
- Recap, Game Book

Game information

**First quarter**

- PHI – Jalen Hurts 1-yard run (Jake Elliott kick), 1:06. Eagles 7–0. **Drive: 10 plays, 73 yards, 5:31.**

**Second quarter**

- BUF – Tyler Bass 48-yard field goal, 11:23. Eagles 7–3. **Drive: 11 plays, 45 yards, 4:43.**
- BUF – Josh Allen 9-yard run (Tyler Bass kick), 8:34. Bills 10–7. **Drive: 4 plays, 29 yards, 2:36.**
- BUF – Stefon Diggs 13-yard pass from Josh Allen (Tyler Bass kick), 0:12. Bills 17–7. **Drive: 5 plays, 36 yards, 0:52.**

**Third quarter**

- PHI – A. J. Brown 3-yard pass from Jalen Hurts (Jake Elliott kick), 7:13. Bills 17–14. **Drive: 6 plays, 62 yards, 3:19.**
- BUF – Josh Allen 16-yard run (Tyler Bass kick), 1:40. Bills 24–14. **Drive: 9 plays, 70 yards, 5:33.**

**Fourth quarter**

- PHI – DeVonta Smith 15-yard pass from Jalen Hurts (Jake Elliott kick), 13:37. Bills 24–21. **Drive: 7 plays, 75 yards, 3:03.**
- PHI – Olamide Zaccheaus 29-yard pass from Jalen Hurts (Jake Elliott kick), 11:07. Eagles 28–24. **Drive: 3 plays, 24 yards, 1:39.**
- BUF – Gabriel Davis 7-yard pass from Josh Allen (Tyler Bass kick), 1:52. Bills 31–28. **Drive: 10 plays, 74 yards, 5:15.**
- PHI – Jake Elliott 59-yard field goal, 0:20. Tied 31–31. **Drive: 9 plays, 34 yards, 1:32.**

**Overtime**

- BUF – Tyler Bass 40-yard field goal, 5:52. Bills 34–31. **Drive: 12 plays, 53 yards, 4:08.**
- PHI – Jalen Hurts 12-yard run, 2:37. Eagles 37–34. **Drive: 9 plays, 75 yards, 3:15.**

**Top passers**

- BUF – Josh Allen – 29/51, 339 yards, 2 TD, INT
- PHI – Jalen Hurts – 18/31, 200 yards, 3 TD, INT

**Top rushers**

- BUF – Josh Allen – 9 rushes, 81 yards, 2 TD
- PHI – D'Andre Swift – 14 rushes, 80 yards

**Top receivers**

- BUF – Gabriel Davis – 6 receptions, 105 yards, TD
- PHI – DeVonta Smith – 7 receptions, 106 yards, TD

Despite trailing 24–14 at the end of the 3rd quarter, the Eagles were able to take the lead following a touchdown, an interception by the Bills and another touchdown. While the Bills took the lead just after the two minute warning with another touchdown, Jake Elliott converted a 59-yard field goal with 20 seconds left to force overtime. After the Eagles held the Bills to a field goal, Jalen Hurts rushed for a touchdown to complete the comeback.

==== Week 13: vs. San Francisco 49ers ====
Week 13: San Francisco 49ers at Philadelphia Eagles – Game summary

Quarter	1	2	3	4	Total
**49ers**	0	14	14	14	**42**
Eagles	6	0	7	6	**19**

at Lincoln Financial Field, Philadelphia, Pennsylvania

- Date: December 3
- Game time: 4:25 p.m. EST
- Game weather: Cloudy, 52 °F (11 °C)
- Game attendance: 69,879
- Referee: Alex Kemp
- TV announcers (Fox): Kevin Burkhardt, Greg Olsen, Erin Andrews and Tom Rinaldi
- Recap, Game Book

Game information

**First quarter**

- PHI – Jake Elliott 26-yard field goal, 9:51. Eagles 3–0. **Drive: 12 plays, 67 yards, 5:09.**
- PHI – Jake Elliott 39-yard field goal, 2:01. Eagles 6–0. **Drive: 12 plays, 53 yards, 6:48.**

**Second quarter**

- SF – Brandon Aiyuk 2-yard pass from Brock Purdy (Jake Moody kick), 7:15. 49ers 7–6. **Drive: 11 plays, 85 yards, 7:01.**
- SF – Christian McCaffrey 2-yard run (Jake Moody kick), 0:38. 49ers 14–6. **Drive: 10 plays, 90 yards, 3:59.**

**Third quarter**

- SF – Deebo Samuel 12-yard run (Jake Moody kick), 11:41. 49ers 21–6. **Drive: 7 plays, 75 yards, 3:19.**
- PHI – Jalen Hurts 1-yard run (Jake Elliott kick), 6:51. 49ers 21–13. **Drive: 10 plays, 58 yards, 4:50.**
- SF – Deebo Samuel 48-yard pass from Brock Purdy (Jake Moody kick), 3:54. 49ers 28–13. **Drive: 5 plays, 77 yards, 2:57.**

**Fourth quarter**

- SF – Jauan Jennings 18-yard pass from Brock Purdy (Jake Moody kick), 10:43. 49ers 35–13. **Drive: 12 plays, 75 yards, 6:41.**
- PHI – DeVonta Smith 2-yard pass from Jalen Hurts (pass failed), 5:33. 49ers 35–19. **Drive: 13 plays, 71 yards, 5:10.**
- SF – Deebo Samuel 46-yard pass from Brock Purdy (Jake Moody kick), 5:19. 49ers 42–19. **Drive: 2 plays, 47 yards, 0:14.**

**Top passers**

- SF – Brock Purdy – 19/27, 314 yards, 4 TD
- PHI – Jalen Hurts – 26/45, 298 yards, TD

**Top rushers**

- SF – Christian McCaffrey – 17 rushes, 93 yards, TD
- PHI – Jalen Hurts – 7 rushes, 20 yards, TD

**Top receivers**

- SF – Deebo Samuel – 4 receptions, 116 yards, 2 TD
- PHI – A. J. Brown – 8 receptions, 114 yards

In a rematch of the 2022 NFC Championship Game, which saw the San Francisco 49ers without their quarterback Brock Purdy, the Eagles took a 6–0 lead in the first quarter buoyed by a poor performance from Purdy and two field goals for Philadelphia by Jake Elliott. However, the next six drives from San Francisco for the remaining three quarters all resulted in touchdowns, with Purdy and Deebo Samuel leading the charge to bring San Francisco to 42 points. Philadelphia could only manage to score on two drives in the second half, both touchdowns from Jalen Hurts and DeVonta Smith, with the latter touchdown being followed by an unsuccessful two-point conversion attempt. Philadelphia scored only 19 points in the loss, falling to 10–2.

==== Week 14: at Dallas Cowboys ====
Week 14: Philadelphia Eagles at Dallas Cowboys – Game summary

Quarter	1	2	3	4	Total
Eagles	0	6	7	0	**13**
**Cowboys**	10	14	3	6	**33**

at AT&T Stadium, Arlington, Texas

- Date: December 10
- Game time: 8:20 p.m. EST/7:20 p.m. CST
- Game weather: None (retractable roof closed)
- Game attendance: 93,752
- Referee: John Hussey
- TV announcers (NBC): Mike Tirico, Cris Collinsworth and Melissa Stark
- Recap, Game Book

Game information

**First quarter**

- DAL – CeeDee Lamb 13-yard pass from Dak Prescott (Brandon Aubrey kick), 10:00. Cowboys 7–0. **Drive: 10 plays, 75 yards, 5:00.**
- DAL – Brandon Aubrey 60-yard field goal, 0:50. Cowboys 10–0. **Drive: 13 plays, 37 yards, 4:52.**

**Second quarter**

- PHI – Jake Elliott 52-yard field goal, 12:34. Cowboys 10–3. **Drive: 8 plays, 41 yards, 3:16.**
- DAL – Rico Dowdle 1-yard run (Brandon Aubrey kick), 6:14. Cowboys 17–3. **Drive: 12 plays, 75 yards, 6:20.**
- PHI – Jake Elliott 44-yard field goal, 1:48. Cowboys 17–6. **Drive: 10 plays, 49 yards, 4:26.**
- DAL – Michael Gallup 1-yard pass from Dak Prescott (Brandon Aubrey kick), 0:20. Cowboys 24–6. **Drive: 8 plays, 75 yards, 1:28.**

**Third quarter**

- PHI – Jalen Carter 42-yard fumble return (Jake Elliott kick), 10:41. Cowboys 24–13.
- DAL – Brandon Aubrey 59-yard field goal, 4:49. Cowboys 27–13. **Drive: 9 plays, 34 yards, 5:52.**

**Fourth quarter**

- DAL – Brandon Aubrey 45-yard field goal, 9:40. Cowboys 30–13. **Drive: 11 plays, 44 yards, 5:45.**
- DAL – Brandon Aubrey 50-yard field goal, 1:08. Cowboys 33–13. **Drive: 9 plays, 56 yards, 5:30.**

**Top passers**

- PHI – Jalen Hurts – 18/27, 197 yards
- DAL – Dak Prescott – 24/39, 271 yards, 2 TD

**Top rushers**

- PHI – D'Andre Swift – 11 rushes, 39 yards
- DAL – Tony Pollard – 16 rushes, 59 yards

**Top receivers**

- PHI – A. J. Brown – 9 receptions, 94 yards
- DAL – Tony Pollard – 7 receptions, 37 yards

The Cowboys took a 24–6 lead at halftime, with Philadelphia being held to two field goals while the Cowboys scored three touchdowns and converted a 60-yard field goal. While Philadelphia did respond in the second half with a fumble recovery touchdown by Jalen Carter, the Eagles could not score again, while Aubrey converted 3 more field goals. Following the loss, the Cowboys took NFC East control from the Eagles.

==== Week 15: at Seattle Seahawks ====
Week 15: Philadelphia Eagles at Seattle Seahawks – Game summary

Quarter	1	2	3	4	Total
Eagles	7	3	7	0	**17**
**Seahawks**	0	3	7	10	**20**

at Lumen Field, Seattle, Washington

- Date: December 18
- Game time: 8:15 p.m. EST/5:15 p.m. PST
- Game weather: Drizzle, 46 °F (8 °C)
- Game attendance: 68,758
- Referee: Clay Martin
- TV announcers (ESPN/ABC): Joe Buck, Troy Aikman and Lisa Salters
- Recap, Game Book

Game information

**First quarter**

- PHI – Jalen Hurts 3-yard run (Jake Elliott kick), 6:31. Eagles 7–0. **Drive: 15 plays, 75 yards, 8:29.**

**Second quarter**

- PHI – Jake Elliott 27-yard field goal, 6:20. Eagles 10–0. **Drive: 16 plays, 63 yards, 8:26.**
- SEA – Jason Myers 26-yard field goal, 1:42. Eagles 10–3. **Drive: 12 plays, 67 yards, 4:38.**

**Third quarter**

- SEA – Kenneth Walker III 23-yard run (Jason Myers kick), 10:05. Tied 10–10. **Drive: 9 plays, 75 yards, 4:55.**
- PHI – Jalen Hurts 1-yard run (Jake Elliott kick), 4:43. Eagles 17–10. **Drive: 12 plays, 75 yards, 5:22.**

**Fourth quarter**

- SEA – Jason Myers 43-yard field goal, 10:00. Eagles 17–13. **Drive: 11 plays, 45 yards, 6:26.**
- SEA – Jaxon Smith-Njigba 29-yard pass from Drew Lock (Jason Myers kick), 0:28. Seahawks 20–17. **Drive: 10 plays, 94 yards, 1:24.**

**Top passers**

- PHI – Jalen Hurts – 17/31, 143 yards, 2 INT
- SEA – Drew Lock – 22/33, 208 yards, TD

**Top rushers**

- PHI – Jalen Hurts – 13 rushes, 82 yards, 2 TD
- SEA – Kenneth Walker III – 19 rushes, 86 yards, TD

**Top receivers**

- PHI – A. J. Brown – 5 receptions, 56 yards
- SEA – DK Metcalf – 5 receptions, 78 yards

Seattle started their backup quarterback Drew Lock in place of the injured Geno Smith. The first three quarters saw Philadelphia take the lead over Seattle 17–10, from two touchdowns from Jalen Hurts and a field goal from Jake Elliott. In the fourth quarter, with two minutes left in the game and Seattle down 13–17, Lock led his team on a 94-yard drive, culminating in a 29-yard pass to Jaxon Smith-Njigba in the end zone for a touchdown to take the lead with 28 seconds left to play. Philadelphia attempted a last-ditch drive to score, which spanned 20 yards and 22 seconds before Hurts was intercepted by Julian Love, sealing the win for Seattle and handing Philadelphia their third straight loss. Seattle also extended their winning streak over Philadelphia to eight, including the teams' 2019 postseason meeting. Since 2008, the Eagles have not beaten the Seahawks.

==== Week 16: vs. New York Giants ====
Christmas Day games

Week 16: New York Giants at Philadelphia Eagles – Game summary

Quarter	1	2	3	4	Total
Giants	3	0	15	7	**25**
**Eagles**	7	13	0	13	**33**

at Lincoln Financial Field, Philadelphia, Pennsylvania

- Date: December 25
- Game time: 4:30 p.m. EST
- Game weather: Cloudy, 51 °F (11 °C)
- Game attendance: 69,879
- Referee: Ronald Torbert
- TV announcers (Fox): Joe Davis, Daryl Johnston and Pam Oliver
- Recap, Game Book

Game information

**First quarter**

- PHI — Jalen Hurts 1-yard run (Jake Elliott kick), 12:28. Eagles 7-0. **Drive: 3 plays, 13 yards, 0:47.**
- NYG — Mason Crosby 52-yard field goal, 8:08. Eagles 7-3. **Drive: 12 plays, 46 yards, 4:23.**

**Second quarter**

- PHI — Jake Elliott 28-yard field goal, 14:56. Eagles 10-3. **Drive: 20 plays, 82 yards, 8:11.**
- PHI — DeVonta Smith 36-yard pass from Jalen Hurts (Jake Elliott kick), 11:52. Eagles 17-3. **Drive: 4 plays, 52 yards, 1:08.**
- PHI — Jake Elliott 21-yard field goal, 0:04. Eagles 20-3. **Drive: 11 plays, 69 yards, 2:47.**

**Third quarter**

- NYG — Saquon Barkley 7-yard run (Mason Crosby kick), 13:44. Eagles 20-10. **Drive: 4 plays, 14 yards, 1:14.**
- NYG — Adoree' Jackson 76-yard interception return (Saquon Barkley run), 0:21. Eagles 20-18.

**Fourth quarter**

- PHI — D'Andre Swift 5-yard run (Jake Elliott kick), 11:11. Eagles 27-18. **Drive: 12 plays, 90 yards, 4:02.**
- PHI — Jake Elliott 44-yard field goal, 6:08. Eagles 30-18. **Drive: 7 plays, 32 yards, 2:46.**
- NYG — Darius Slayton 69-yard pass from Tyrod Taylor (Mason Crosby kick), 5:32. Eagles 30-25. **Drive: 2 plays, 75 yards, 0:42.**
- PHI — Jake Elliott 43-yard field goal, 1:14. Eagles 33-25. **Drive: 9 plays, 50 yards, 4:12.**

**Top passers**

- NYG — Tyrod Taylor — 7/16, 133 yards, TD, INT
- PHI — Jalen Hurts — 24/38, 301 yards, TD, INT

**Top rushers**

- NYG — Saquon Barkley — 23 rushes, 80 yards, TD
- PHI — D'Andre Swift — 20 rushes, 92 yards, TD

**Top receivers**

- NYG — Darius Slayton — 3 receptions, 90 yards, TD
- PHI — A. J. Brown — 6 receptions, 80 yards

The Eagles took a 20–3 lead at halftime on touchdowns by Jalen Hurts and DeVonta Smith and two field goals by Jake Elliott, while the Giants' only scoring play of the half was a field goal by Mason Crosby. However, the Giants started to chip away at the Eagles' lead during the third quarter. During the kickoff at the beginning of the half, Giants linebacker Isaiah Simmons threw Eagles wide receiver Olamide Zaccheaus into running back Boston Scott, causing a fumble that was recovered by Simmons. Soon after, Saquon Barkley scored on a 7-yard run, and near the end of the third quarter, Hurts threw an interception to cornerback Adoree' Jackson, who returned it 76 yards for a touchdown, during which Hurts was flagged for a horse-collar tackle while trying to chase down Jackson. The Giants elected to enforce that penalty on a two-point conversion attempt, which Barkley scored, cutting the Eagles' lead to 20–18. In the fourth quarter, on the Eagles' next drive, Hurts converted a 3rd-and-20 to wide receiver A. J. Brown, which eventually lead to a 5-yard touchdown run by D'Andre Swift. The Giants turned the ball over on downs after failing to convert a 4th-and-1, leading to Elliott kicking another field goal to increase Philadelphia's lead to 30–18. New York responded with a two-play 75-yard drive, culminating in Darius Slayton scoring on a 69-yard pass from Tyrod Taylor, cutting the Eagles' lead to 30–25. Trying to run out the clock with the ground game, Philadelphia drove to the New York 26-yard line, but could only run the clock down to 1:14, resulting in another field goal by Elliott, keeping it a one-score game at 33–25. The Giants, now needing a touchdown and a two-point conversion to send the game into overtime, drove to the Philadelphia 26-yard line with three seconds remaining, but Taylor threw a pass that was intercepted in the end zone by Eagles cornerback Kelee Ringo, sealing the victory for the Eagles and snapping their three-game losing streak.

The Eagles improved to 11–4 with the win and regained control of the NFC East following the Dallas Cowboys' loss to the Miami Dolphins the previous night.

==== Week 17: vs. Arizona Cardinals ====
Week 17: Arizona Cardinals at Philadelphia Eagles – Game summary

Quarter	1	2	3	4	Total
**Cardinals**	3	3	15	14	**35**
Eagles	7	14	0	10	**31**

at Lincoln Financial Field, Philadelphia, Pennsylvania

- Date: December 31
- Game time: 1:00 p.m. EST
- Game weather: Partly cloudy, 45 °F (7 °C)
- Game attendance: 69,879
- Referee: Bill Vinovich
- TV announcers (Fox): Joe Davis, Daryl Johnston and Pam Oliver
- Recap, Game Book

Game information

**First quarter**

- ARI – Matt Prater 28-yard field goal, 5:12. Cardinals 3-0. **Drive: 14 plays, 64 yards, 7:46.**
- PHI – Julio Jones 12-yard pass from Jalen Hurts (Jake Elliott kick), 0:42. Eagles 7-3. **Drive: 9 plays, 69 yards, 4:33.**

**Second quarter**

- PHI – Sydney Brown 99-yard interception return (Jake Elliott kick), 12:01. Eagles 14-3.
- ARI – Matt Prater 34-yard field goal, 1:53. Eagles 14-6. **Drive: 16 plays, 63 yards, 9:54.**
- PHI – Julio Jones 22-yard pass from Jalen Hurts (Jake Elliott kick), 0:24. Eagles 21-6. **Drive: 9 plays, 75 yards, 1:54.**

**Third quarter**

- ARI – Michael Carter 6-yard pass from Kyler Murray (Matt Prater kick), 8:48. Eagles 21-13. **Drive: 10 plays, 75 yards, 6:18.**
- ARI – James Conner 5-yard pass from Kyler Murray (Kyler Murray-Michael Wilson pass), 2:10. Tied 21-21. **Drive: 9 plays, 77 yards, 5:03.**

**Fourth quarter**

- PHI – Dallas Goedert 9-yard pass from Jalen Hurts (Jake Elliott kick), 10:02. Eagles 28-21. **Drive: 13 plays, 70 yards, 7:06.**
- ARI – Michael Wilson 5-yard pass from Kyler Murray (Matt Prater kick), 5:30. Tied 28-28. **Drive: 8 plays, 48 yards, 4:29.**
- PHI – Jake Elliott 43-yard field goal, 2:37. Eagles 31-28. **Drive: 6 plays, 24 yards, 2:53.**
- ARI – James Conner 2-yard run (Matt Prater kick), 0:36. Cardinals 35-31. **Drive: 7 plays, 70 yards, 2:01.**

**Top passers**

- ARI – Kyler Murray – 25/31, 232 yards, 3 TD, INT
- PHI – Jalen Hurts – 18/23, 167 yards, 3 TD, INT

**Top rushers**

- ARI – James Conner – 26 rushes, 128 yards, TD
- PHI – D'Andre Swift – 13 rushes, 61 yards

**Top receivers**

- ARI – Greg Dortch – 7 receptions, 82 yards
- PHI – A. J. Brown – 4 receptions, 53 yards

Philadelphia took a 21–6 lead at halftime from three touchdowns, two from Julio Jones and one from an interception return by Sydney Brown. Arizona only scored two field goals in the first half, but would make the only scoring plays in the third quarter: touchdowns from Michael Carter and James Conner, with the latter touchdown being followed by a successful two-point conversion to tie the game at 21–21. In the fourth quarter, Philadelphia and Arizona each scored touchdowns, from Dallas Goedert and Michael Wilson respectively, keeping the game tied at 28–28. Despite the Cardinals attempting an onside kick and failing to recover, a poor offense led Philadelphia to do a field goal to take the lead with two minutes left in regulation, during which key receiver DeVonta Smith was injured and withdrew from the game. Kyler Murray led Arizona on a 70-yard drive, with Conner scoring a decisive touchdown in the final minute. With 32 seconds left to play, Jalen Hurts attempted a last-ditch effort to score only to be intercepted by Joey Blount, mirroring Philadelphia's defeat to the Seattle Seahawks two weeks prior, thus sealing the upset for Arizona.

With the stunning 35–31 loss and the Dallas Cowboys' win over the Detroit Lions the night prior, the Eagles surrendered control of the NFC East and their playoff positioning to Dallas. As the San Francisco 49ers had defeated the Washington Commanders that same day, Philadelphia also lost their chances at clinching the first seed in the conference, as San Francisco clinched the first seed.

==== Week 18: at New York Giants ====
Week 18: Philadelphia Eagles at New York Giants – Game summary

Quarter	1	2	3	4	Total
Eagles	0	0	3	7	**10**
**Giants**	3	21	0	3	**27**

at MetLife Stadium, East Rutherford, New Jersey

- Date: January 7
- Game time: 4:25 p.m. EST
- Game weather: Overcast, 36 °F (2 °C)
- Game attendance: 75,740
- Referee: Craig Wrolstad
- TV announcers (CBS): Ian Eagle, Charles Davis and Evan Washburn
- Recap, Game Book

Game information

**First quarter**

- NYG – Mason Crosby 24-yard field goal, 6:57. Giants 3–0. **Drive: 9 plays, 67 yards, 4:06.**

**Second quarter**

- NYG – Saquon Barkley 2-yard run (Mason Crosby kick), 9:42. Giants 10–0. **Drive: 9 plays, 48 yards, 4:28.**
- NYG – Saquon Barkley 3-yard run (Mason Crosby kick), 5:13. Giants 17–0. **Drive: 6 plays, 55 yards, 2:53.**
- NYG – Darius Slayton 19-yard pass from Tyrod Taylor (Mason Crosby kick), 1:53. Giants 24–0. **Drive: 4 plays, 73 yards, 1:09.**

**Third quarter**

- PHI – Jake Elliott 36-yard field goal, 1:15. Giants 24–3. **Drive: 13 plays, 66 yards, 4:52.**

**Fourth quarter**

- PHI – Quez Watkins 16-yard pass from Marcus Mariota (Jake Elliott kick), 10:21. Giants 24–10. **Drive: 8 plays, 81 yards, 3:29.**
- NYG – Mason Crosby 21-yard field goal, 3:42. Giants 27–10. **Drive: 12 plays, 72 yards, 6:36.**

**Top passers**

- PHI – Marcus Mariota – 13/20, 148 yards, TD, INT
- NYG – Tyrod Taylor – 23/32, 297 yards, TD, INT

**Top rushers**

- PHI – Kenneth Gainwell – 7 rushes, 62 yards
- NYG – Saquon Barkley – 18 rushes, 46 yards, 2 TD

**Top receivers**

- PHI – Quez Watkins – 8 receptions, 93 yards, TD
- NYG – Wan'Dale Robinson – 5 receptions, 85 yards

New York came out of the gate with an explosive offense that saw them score 24 points in the first half off of three touchdowns and a field goal, with Tyrod Taylor throwing for 229 yards in the first half. Philadelphia failed to score in the first half, during which A. J. Brown, Sydney Brown, and Jalen Hurts withdrew from the game due to injuries. Marcus Mariota entered the game for Hurts and led Philadelphia to a field goal and a touchdown in the second half. Although New York's offense had cooled down by then, the Eagles were unable to overcome the deficit as they ended the regular season with a 27–10 loss.

With the loss, the Eagles ended their season 11–6, and clinched the fifth seed in the NFC as the Dallas Cowboys had beaten the Washington Commanders to take the division title and mark the NFC East's 19th consecutive season without a repeat champion.

=== Standings ===
==== Division ====
NFC East
	W	L	T	PCT	DIV	CONF	PF	PA	STK
^{(2)} Dallas Cowboys	12	5	0	.706	5–1	9–3	509	315	W2
^{(5)} Philadelphia Eagles	11	6	0	.647	4–2	7–5	433	428	L2
New York Giants	6	11	0	.353	3–3	5–7	266	407	W1
Washington Commanders	4	13	0	.235	0–6	2–10	329	518	L8

==== Conference ====
NFC
#	Team	Division	W	L	T	PCT	DIV	CONF	SOS	SOV	STK
**Division leaders**
1 (Note: San Francisco finished ahead of Dallas and Detroit based on conference record, claiming the No. 1 seed.)	San Francisco 49ers	West	12	5	0	.706	5–1	10–2	.509	.475	L1
2 (Note: Dallas claimed the No. 2 seed over Detroit based on head-to-head victory.)	Dallas Cowboys	East	12	5	0	.706	5–1	9–3	.446	.392	W2
3	Detroit Lions	North	12	5	0	.706	4–2	8–4	.481	.436	W1
4 (Note: Tampa Bay finished ahead of New Orleans in the NFC South based on common record. (Tampa Bay is 8–4 against Minnesota, Chicago, Detroit, Green Bay, Atlanta, Carolina, Houston, Tennessee, Jacksonville, and Indianapolis, while New Orleans is 6–6 against the same teams.))	Tampa Bay Buccaneers	South	9	8	0	.529	4–2	7–5	.481	.379	W1
**Wild cards**
5	Philadelphia Eagles	East	11	6	0	.647	4–2	7–5	.481	.476	L2
6	Los Angeles Rams	West	10	7	0	.588	5–1	8–4	.529	.453	W4
7 (Note: Green Bay and Seattle finished ahead of New Orleans based on conference record.) (Note: Green Bay finished ahead of Seattle based on strength of victory, claiming the 7th and final playoff spot.)	Green Bay Packers	North	9	8	0	.529	4–2	7–5	.474	.458	W3
**Did not qualify for the postseason**
8	Seattle Seahawks	West	9	8	0	.529	2–4	7–5	.512	.392	W1
9	New Orleans Saints	South	9	8	0	.529	4–2	6–6	.433	.340	W2
10 (Note: Minnesota finished ahead of Atlanta based on head-to-head victory. Division tie break was initially used to eliminate Chicago (see below).) (Note: Minnesota finished ahead of Chicago based on common record. (Minnesota is 5–7 against Tampa Bay, Los Angeles Chargers, Carolina, Kansas City, Green Bay, Atlanta, New Orleans, Denver, Las Vegas, and Detroit, while Chicago is 4–8 against the same teams.))	Minnesota Vikings	North	7	10	0	.412	2–4	6–6	.509	.454	L4
11 (Note: Chicago finished ahead of Atlanta based on head-to-head victory.)	Chicago Bears	North	7	10	0	.412	2–4	6–6	.464	.370	L1
12	Atlanta Falcons	South	7	10	0	.412	3–3	4–8	.429	.462	L2
13	New York Giants	East	6	11	0	.353	3–3	5–7	.512	.353	W1
14 (Note: Washington finished ahead of Arizona based on head-to-head victory.)	Washington Commanders	East	4	13	0	.235	0–6	2–10	.512	.338	L8
15	Arizona Cardinals	West	4	13	0	.235	0–6	3–9	.561	.588	L1
16	Carolina Panthers	South	2	15	0	.118	1–5	1–11	.522	.500	L3
**Tiebreakers** (Note: When breaking ties for three or more teams under the NFL's rules, they are first broken within divisions, then comparing only the highest-ranked remaining team from each division.)

== Postseason ==
=== Schedule ===
Round	Date	Opponent (seed)	Result	Record	Venue	Recap
Wild Card	January 15	at Tampa Bay Buccaneers (4)	L 9–32	0–1	Raymond James Stadium	Recap

=== Game summaries ===
==== NFC Wild Card Playoffs: at (4) Tampa Bay Buccaneers ====
NFC Wild Card Playoffs: (5) Philadelphia Eagles at (4) Tampa Bay Buccaneers – Game summary

Quarter	1	2	3	4	Total
Eagles	0	9	0	0	9
Buccaneers	10	6	9	7	32

at Raymond James Stadium, Tampa, Florida

- Date: January 15, 2024
- Game time: 8:15 p.m. EST
- Game weather: Cloudy, 67 °F (19 °C)
- Game attendance: 63,397
- Referee: Adrian Hill
- TV announcers (ABC/ESPN/ESPN2/ESPN+): Joe Buck, Troy Aikman, Lisa Salters and Laura Rutledge
- Recap, Game Book

Game information

First quarter

- TB – Chase McLaughlin 28-yard field goal, 10:02. Buccaneers 3–0. Drive: 12 plays, 65 yards, 4:58.
- TB – David Moore 44-yard pass from Baker Mayfield (Chase McLaughlin kick), 5:47. Buccaneers 10–0. Drive: 4 plays, 79 yards, 1:20.

Second quarter

- TB – Chase McLaughlin 54-yard field goal, 14:03. Buccaneers 13–0. Drive: 10 plays, 40 yards, 5:19.
- PHI – Jake Elliott 47-yard field goal, 11:31. Buccaneers 13–3. Drive: 7 plays, 45 yards, 2:32.
- TB – Chase McLaughlin 48-yard field goal, 5:35. Buccaneers 16–3. Drive: 15 plays, 45 yards, 5:56.
- PHI – Dallas Goedert 5-yard pass from Jalen Hurts (two-point conversion failed), 3:06. Buccaneers 16–9. Drive: 5 plays, 75 yards, 2:29.

Third quarter

- TB – Jalen Hurts intentional grounding in endzone resulting in TB safety, 2:16. Buccaneers 18–9.
- TB – Trey Palmer 56-yard pass from Baker Mayfield (Chase McLaughlin kick), 1:19. Buccaneers 25–9. Drive: 2 plays, 62 yards, 0:59.

Fourth quarter

- TB – Chris Godwin 23-yard pass from Baker Mayfield (Chase McLaughlin kick), 5:42. Buccaneers 32–9. Drive: 12 plays, 83 yards, 6:15.

Top passers

- PHI – Jalen Hurts – 25/35, 250 yards, TD
- TB – Baker Mayfield – 22/36, 337 yards, 3 TD

Top rushers

- PHI – D'Andre Swift – 10 rushes, 34 yards
- TB – Rachaad White – 18 rushes, 72 yards

Top receivers

- PHI – DeVonta Smith – 8 receptions, 148 yards
- TB – Cade Otton – 8 receptions, 89 yards

Philadelphia returned to the playoffs coming off a disastrous late-season collapse that saw them fall into the fifth seed, and were hoping to reverse their momentum with a win over NFC South champion Tampa Bay. Wide receiver A. J. Brown, who suffered a knee injury in the regular season finale against the New York Giants, was unable to make it to the game.

Philadelphia's poor defense struggled to tackle Tampa Bay's ball carriers, giving up huge runs down the field; Tampa Bay logged 119 rushing yards on 29 carries and made 6-of-14 third down conversions, with Baker Mayfield throwing for 337 yards and three touchdowns. Most notably, cornerback James Bradberry made contact with Trey Palmer but failed to bring him down, proving costly as it facilitated his 56-yard touchdown run in the third quarter. Philadelphia's offensive line failed to perform well as Tampa Bay also employed the blitz defense against Jalen Hurts, leading to him getting sacked three times, with one of them occurring inside of Philadelphia's own end zone, resulting in a safety.

On the offensive side, Philadelphia were held to just a field goal and a passing touchdown by Tampa Bay's defense. Following their touchdown, Philadelphia attempted a "tush push" maneuver for a two-point conversion, but Tampa Bay was able to hold them off and pull Hurts away from the end zone. Although Hurts threw for 250 yards and DeVonta Smith caught for 148 yards, not once did Philadelphia convert off of a third down, and they only logged 42 rushing yards on 15 carries.

Their sixth loss in seven games, Philadelphia exited the postseason early with the 32–9 blowout loss, unable to defend their NFC championship. After the game, both Brian Johnson and Sean Desai were relieved of their duties as offensive and defensive coordinators, respectively.
