= List of second-generation NFL players =

The following is a partial list of National Football League players whose fathers also played professional football in the NFL or any league that merged with it. The list includes the son's name and position and the father's name and position.

== Key ==
| * | Elected to the Pro Football Hall of Fame |

Positions played
| C | Center | G | Guard | NT | Nose Tackle | QB | Quarterback |
| CB | Cornerback | K | Placekicker | OL | Off. Lineman | RB | Running Back |
| DE | Defensive End | KR | Kick Returner | OT | Off. Tackle | S | Safety |
| DT | Defensive Tackle | LB | Linebacker | P | Punter | TE | Tight End |
| FB | Fullback | LS | Long Snapper | PR | Punt Returner | WR | Wide Receiver |

== List of players ==
=== Second–generation ===
| Father | Position | Son(s) | Position |
|---|---|---|---|
| Tony Adamle | RB/LB | Mike Adamle | RB |
| George Adams | RB | Jamal Adams | S/LB |
| Julius Adams | DL | Keith Adams | LB |
| Sam Adams Sr. | OL | Sam Adams Jr. | DL |
| Ray Agnew Jr. | DL | Ray Agnew III | FB |
| Allen Aldridge Sr. | DL | Allen Aldridge Jr. | LB |
| Bruce Alford Sr. | End | Bruce Alford Jr. | K |
| John Alt | OT | Joe Alt | OT |
| Flipper Anderson | WR | Dres Anderson | WR |
| Charlie Ane Jr. | C | Charlie Ane III | C |
| Gene Atkins | S | Geno Atkins | DT |
| George Atkinson Jr. | S | George Atkinson III | RB |
| Marion Barber Jr. | RB | Marion Barber III | RB |
| Marion Barber Jr. | RB | Dominique Barber | S |
| Rudy Barber | LB | Kantroy Barber | RB |
| Don Beebe | WR | Chad Beebe | WR |
| Bobby Bell Sr. * | LB/DE | Bobby Bell Jr. | LB |
| Caesar Belser | LB/S | Jason Belser | S |
| Bob Bercich | S | Pete Bercich | LB |
| John Bettridge | LB/FB | Ed Bettridge | LB |
| Bennie Blades | S | H. B. Blades | LB |
| Jerry Blanton | LB | Kendall Blanton | TE |
| Juran Bolden | CB | Isaiah Bolden | CB |
| John Bosa | DE | Joey Bosa | DE |
| John Bosa | DE | Nick Bosa | DE |
| John Bostic | DB | Jon Bostic | LB |
| Ed Bradley Sr. | G/DE | Ed Bradley Jr. | LB |
| Harold Bradley Sr. | G | Harold Bradley Jr. | G |
| Chris Brazzell | WR | Chris Brazzell II | WR |
| Clyde Brock | T | Matt Brock | DE |
| Blake Brockermeyer | T | James Brockermeyer | C |
| Perry Brooks | DT | Ahmad Brooks | LB |
| Tony Brooks | RB | Anthony Barr | LB |
| Orlando Brown Sr. | OT | Orlando Brown Jr. | OT |
| Keith Browner | LB | Keith Browner Jr. | DE |
| Ross Browner | DE | Max Starks | T |
| Mark Bruener | TE | Carson Bruener | LB |
| Ed Budde | G | Brad Budde | G |
| George Buehler | G | David Buehler | K |
| Hank Bullough | G | Chuck Bullough | LB |
| Jim Burrow | DB | Joe Burrow | QB |
| Devin Bush Sr. | S | Devin Bush Jr. | LB |
| Bobby Butler | CB | Brice Butler | WR |
| Gill Byrd | CB | Jairus Byrd | S |
| Ken Campbell | WR | Scott Campbell | QB |
| Billy Cannon Sr. | RB/TE/E | Billy Cannon Jr. | LB |
| Reg Carolan | TE | Brett Carolan | TE |
| Maurice Carthon | FB | Ran Carthon | RB |
| Rob Carpenter | RB | Bobby Carpenter | LB |
| Dale Carter | CB | Nigel Warrior | S/CB |
| Rubin Carter | DT | Andre Carter | DE |
| Wendell Cason | CB | Antoine Cason | CB |
| Howard Cassady | HB/SE | Craig Cassady | DB |
| Jeremiah Castille | CB | Tim Castille | FB |
| Jeremiah Castille | CB | Simeon Castille | CB |
| Tony Cline | DE | Tony Cline Jr. | TE |
| Paul Coffman | TE | Chase Coffman | TE |
| Ronnie Coleman | RB | KaRon Coleman | RB |
| Craig Colquitt | P | Britton Colquitt | P |
| Craig Colquitt | P | Dustin Colquitt | P |
| Bryan Cox | LB | Bryan Cox Jr. | DE |
| Howard Cross | TE | Howard Cross III | DL |
| Gary Crum | T | Frank Crum | OT |
| Chris Dalman | C | Drew Dalman | C |
| LeShun Daniels Sr. | OT/G | LeShun Daniels | RB |
| LeShun Daniels Sr. | OT/G | James Daniels | G |
| Steve DeOssie | C | Zak DeOssie | LS |
| Torin Dorn | CB | Myles Dorn | S |
| Tony Dorsett * | RB | Anthony Dorsett | S |
| Gary Downs | RB | Caleb Downs | S |
| Gary Downs | RB | Josh Downs | WR |
| Moose Dunstan | T | Bill Dunstan | DT |
| Ferrell Edmunds | TE | Terrell Edmunds | S |
| Ferrell Edmunds | TE | Tremaine Edmunds | LB |
| Ferrell Edmunds | TE | Trey Edmunds | RB |
| Stan Edwards | RB | Braylon Edwards | WR |
| Mario Edwards | CB | Mario Edwards Jr. | DT |
| Abram Elam | S | Kaiir Elam | CB |
| Riki Ellison | LB | Rhett Ellison | TE |
| Luther Elliss | DT | Christian Elliss | LB |
| Luther Elliss | DT | Jonah Elliss | LB |
| Luther Elliss | DT | Kaden Elliss | LB |
| Luther Elliss | DT | Noah Elliss | DT |
| George Farmer | WR | Danny Farmer | WR |
| Mel Farr | RB | Mel Farr Jr. | RB |
| Mel Farr | RB | Mike Farr | WR |
| Mark Fields | LB | Mark Fields II | CB |
| Todd Fordham | OT | Caden Fordham | LB |
| Chuck Foreman | RB | Jay Foreman | LB |
| Jerome Foster | DL | Javon Foster | OT |
| Joe Francis | QB | Jon Francis | RB |
| Joe Francis | QB | Ikaika Alama-Francis | DE |
| Oronde Gadsden | WR | Oronde Gadsden II | TE |
| Derrick Gaffney | WR | Jabar Gaffney | WR |
| Gale Gilbert | QB | Garrett Gilbert | QB |
| Frank Gore | RB | Frank Gore Jr. | RB |
| Tom Graham | LB | Daniel Graham | TE |
| Bob Griese * | QB | Brian Griese | QB |
| Russ Grimm * | G | Cody Grimm | S |
| Pat Harlow | T | Sean Harlow | G |
| Britt Hager | LB | Bryce Hager | LB |
| James Harrell | LB | Jaylen Harrell | LB |
| Sean Harris | LB | Jalen Harris | DE |
| Marvin Harrison * | WR | Marvin Harrison Jr. | WR |
| Don Hasselbeck | TE | Matt Hasselbeck | QB |
| Don Hasselbeck | TE | Tim Hasselbeck | QB |
| Andy Heck | OT/OL | Charlie Heck | OT |
| Craig Heyward | FB | Cameron Heyward | DT |
| Craig Heyward | FB | Connor Heyward | FB/TE |
| Wally Highsmith | G | Alonzo Highsmith | RB |
| Chris Hinton | OT | Christopher Hinton | NT |
| Chris Hinton | OT | Myles Hinton | OT |
| James Hodgins | FB | Isaiah Hodgins | WR |
| Brad Hopkins | OT | Brycen Hopkins | TE |
| Joe Horn | WR | Jaycee Horn | CB |
| Joe Horn | WR | Joe Horn Jr. | WR |
| Bobby Humphrey | RB | Marlon Humphrey | CB |
| Maurice Hurst | CB | Maurice Hurst Jr. | DL |
| Henry Hynoski Sr. | FB | Henry Hynoski Jr. | FB |
| Mark Ingram Sr. | WR | Mark Ingram II | RB |
| Qadry Ismail | WR | Qadir Ismail | TE |
| Jim Jeffcoat | DE | Jackson Jeffcoat | DE |
| Shawn Jefferson | WR | Van Jefferson | WR |
| Kris Jenkins | DT | Kris Jenkins Jr. | DT |
| Jason Johnson | WR | Jon'Vea Johnson | WR |
| Andre Jones | LB | T. J. Jones | WR |
| Dub Jones | RB | Bert Jones | QB |
| Marvin Jones | LB | Marvin Jones Jr. | LB |
| Robert Jones | LB | Zay Jones | WR |
| Steve Jordan | TE | Cameron Jordan | DE |
| Jim Juriga | OL | Luke Juriga | C |
| Steve Kaufusi | DL | Bronson Kaufusi | DE |
| Jack Kemp | QB | Jeff Kemp | QB |
| Pete Kendall | G | Drew Kendall | C |
| Joe Klecko * | DE/DT | Dan Klecko | DT/FB |
| Carnell Lake | S | Quentin Lake | S |
| Kwamie Lassiter | DB | Kwamie Lassiter II | WR |
| Earl Leggett | DT | Brad Leggett | C |
| Greg Lloyd | LB | Greg Lloyd Jr. | LB |
| Kevin Lockett | WR | Tyler Lockett | WR |
| Howie Long * | DL | Chris Long | DE |
| Howie Long * | DL | Kyle Long | G |
| Ronnie Lott * | S | Ryan Nece | LB |
| Oliver Luck | QB | Andrew Luck | QB |
| Archie Manning | QB | Eli Manning | QB |
| Archie Manning | QB | Peyton Manning * | QB |
| Marv Marinovich | G | Todd Marinovich | QB |
| Jerry Marion | WR | Brock Marion | S |
| Tee Martin | QB | Amari Rodgers | WR |
| Russell Maryland | DT | R. J. Maryland | TE |
| Curtis Marsh Sr. | WR | Curtis Marsh Jr. | CB |
| Curtis Marsh Sr. | WR | Cassius Marsh | DE |
| Stafford Mays | DL | Taylor Mays | S |
| James McAlister | RB | Chris McAlister | CB |
| Ed McCaffrey | WR | Christian McCaffrey | RB |
| Ed McCaffrey | WR | Luke McCaffrey | WR |
| Ed McCaffrey | WR | Max McCaffrey | WR |
| Willie McClendon | RB | Bryan McClendon | WR |
| Lawrence McCutcheon | RB | Daylon McCutcheon | CB |
| Tim McDonald | S | T. J. McDonald | S |
| Tim McDonald | S | Tevin McDonald | S |
| Kent McCloughan | CB | Dave McCloughan | CB |
| Reggie McKenzie | LB | Kahlil McKenzie | OG/DT |
| Ernie McMillan | OT | Erik McMillan | CB/S |
| Tim McTyer | CB | Torry McTyer | CB |
| Terrence Metcalf | G | DK Metcalf | WR |
| Terry Metcalf | PR/RB | Eric Metcalf | PR/WR/RB |
| Ray Mickens | CB | R. J. Mickens | S |
| Corey Miller | LB | Christian Miller | LB |
| Frank Minnifield | CB | Chase Minnifield | CB |
| Alex Molden | CB | Elijah Molden | S |
| Randy Moss * | WR | Thaddeus Moss | TE |
| Emery Moorehead | WR/TE | Aaron Moorehead | WR |
| Muhsin Muhammad | WR | Moose Muhammad III | WR |
| Ted Nesser Jr. | C/G/T | Charlie Nesser | RB |
| Robert Newhouse | RB | Reggie Newhouse | WR |
| Doug Nussmeier | QB | Garrett Nussmeier | QB |
| Muhammad Oliver | CB | Isaiah Oliver | CB |
| Terrell Owens * | WR | Terique Owens | WR |
| Walter Payton * | RB | Jarrett Payton | RB |
| Todd Peat | G | Andrus Peat | OT |
| Doug Pederson | QB | Josh Pederson | TE |
| Bruce Perkins | RB | Paul Perkins | RB |
| Bruce Perkins | RB | Bryce Perkins | QB |
| Brett Perriman | WR | Breshad Perriman | WR |
| Michael Pittman Sr. | RB | Michael Pittman Jr. | WR |
| Joey Porter | LB | Joey Porter Jr. | CB |
| Dennis Price | DB | Sheldon Price | CB |
| Ricky Proehl | WR | Austin Proehl | WR |
| Montae Reagor | DT | Jalen Reagor | WR |
| Willie Jake Reed | WR | J. R. Reed | S |
| Dan Reeder | RB | Troy Reeder | LB |
| Spencer Reid | LB | Karene Reid | LB |
| Ray Renfro | F/HB | Mike Renfro | WR |
| Ed Reynolds | LB | Ed Reynolds II | S |
| Jerry Rice * | WR | Brenden Rice | WR |
| Jerry Rice * | WR | Jerry Rice Jr. | WR |
| Gerald Riggs | RB | Cody Riggs | CB |
| Terry Robiskie | RB | Brian Robiskie | WR |
| Terry Robiskie | RB | Andrew Robiskie | C/G |
| Angel Rubio | DE | Gabriel Rubio | DT |
| Jon Runyan Sr. | OT | Jon Runyan Jr. | G |
| Tom Ruud | LB | Barrett Ruud | LB |
| Asante Samuel Sr. | CB | Asante Samuel Jr. | CB |
| Deion Sanders * | CB | Shedeur Sanders | QB |
| Deion Sanders * | CB | Shilo Sanders | S |
| Benny Sapp | CB | Benny Sapp III | S |
| George Sauer | HB | George Sauer Jr. | WR |
| Don Shula * | CB | Dave Shula | WR |
| Mickey Shuler | TE | Mickey Shuler Jr. | TE |
| Phil Simms | QB | Chris Simms | QB |
| Phil Simms | QB | Matt Simms | QB |
| Jackie Slater * | OT | Matthew Slater | WR/ST |
| Emmitt Smith* | RB | E. J. Smith | RB |
| Irv Smith Sr. | TE | Irv Smith Jr. | TE |
| Ron Springs | RB | Shawn Springs | CB |
| Gary Stills | DE | Dante Stills | DE |
| Ken Stills | S | Kenny Stills | WR |
| Ron Stone | G | Ron Stone Jr. | DE |
| Steve Stonebreaker | LB | Mike Stonebreaker | LB |
| John Stonehouse | P | Jack Stonehouse | P |
| Lorenzo Styles | LB | Lorenzo Styles Jr. | S |
| Lorenzo Styles | LB | Sonny Styles | LB |
| Patrick Surtain | CB | Patrick Surtain II | CB |
| Steve Suhey | G | Matt Suhey | RB |
| Mosi Tatupu | RB | Lofa Tatupu | LB |
| Jason Taylor * | DE | Mason Taylor | TE |
| Cedric Tillman | WR | Cedric Tillman | WR |
| Al Toon | WR | Nick Toon | WR |
| Steve Trapilo | OG | Ozzy Trapilo | OT |
| Greg Tremble | S | Tommy Tremble | TE |
| Jeremiah Trotter | LB | Jeremiah Trotter Jr. | LB |
| Jeremiah Trotter | LB | Josiah Trotter | LB |
| Manu Tuiasosopo | DL | Marques Tuiasosopo | QB |
| Manu Tuiasosopo | DL | Zach Tuiasosopo | FB/RB |
| Jessie Tuggle | LB | Grady Jarrett | DT |
| Jessie Tuggle | LB | Justin Tuggle | LB |
| Maurice Turner | RB | Bryan Kehl | LB |
| Maurice Turner | RB | Billy Turner | OT |
| Brad Van Pelt | LB | Bradlee Van Pelt | QB |
| Mike Vrabel | LB | Tyler Vrabel | OT |
| Ted Washington Sr. | LB | Ted Washington Jr. | DL |
| Tim Watson | S | Christian Watson | WR |
| Greg Werner | TE | Pete Werner | LB |
| Sheldon White | CB | Cody White | WR |
| David Whitehurst | QB | Charlie Whitehurst | QB |
| Jermaine Williams | RB | Josh Williams | RB |
| George Wilson Sr. | E | George Wilson Jr. | QB |
| Cedrick Wilson Sr. | WR | Cedrick Wilson Jr. | WR |
| Stanley Wilson Sr. | RB | Stanley Wilson Jr. | CB |
| Tommy Wilson | HB | Steve Wilson | DB/WR |
| Tim Wilson | RB | Josh Wilson | CB |
| Antoine Winfield Sr. | CB | Antoine Winfield Jr. | S |
| George Winslow | P | Ryan Winslow | P |
| Kellen Winslow * | TE | Kellen Winslow II | TE |
| Leo Wisniewski | NT | Stefen Wisniewski | G/C |
| Robert Woods | WR | Robert Woods | WR |
| Craig Yeast | WR | Russ Yeast | S |
| Willie Young | OT | Rodney Young | DB |

=== Third–generation ===
| Grandfather | Position | Son(s) | Position | Grandson(s) | Position |
|---|---|---|---|---|---|
| Nick Chickillo | LB | Tony Chickillo | NT | Anthony Chickillo | LB |
| Ted Karras Sr. | DT | Ted Karras Jr. | DT | Ted Karras III | C |
| Jake Kupp | G | Craig Kupp | QB | Cooper Kupp | WR |
| Clay Matthews Sr. | DL | Clay Matthews Jr. | LB | Clay Matthews III | LB |
| Clay Matthews Sr. | DL | Clay Matthews Jr. | LB | Casey Matthews | LB |
| Clay Matthews Sr. | DL | Bruce Matthews * | OL | Kevin Matthews | OL |
| Clay Matthews Sr. | DL | Bruce Matthews * | OL | Jake Matthews | OT |
| Palmer Pyle | G | Eric Kumerow | DE | Jake Kumerow | WR |
| George Pyne II | T | George Pyne III | DT | Jim Pyne | OL |
| Sherman Smith | RB | Deland McCullough | RB | Dasan McCullough | LB |
| Roy Williams | DT | Eric Williams | DT | Kyle Williams | OL |

== See also ==
- List of professional sports families
- List of family relations in American football
- List of association football (soccer) families
  - List of African association football families
  - List of European association football families
    - List of English association football families
    - List of former Yugoslavia association football families
    - List of Scottish football families
    - List of Spanish association football families
  - Category:Association football families
- List of Australian rules football families
- List of second-generation Major League Baseball players
- List of second-generation National Basketball Association players
- List of boxing families
- List of chess families
- List of International cricket families
- List of family relations in the National Hockey League
- List of family relations in rugby league
- List of international rugby union families
- List of professional wrestling families
