= Ellias =

Surname list

Ellias is a surname. Notable people with the surname include:

- Mohammed Ellias (born 1963), Bangladeshi politician
- Roddy Ellias (born 1949), Canadian guitarist, composer, and improviser

== See also ==
- Ellia
