= Christian Elliss =

American football player (born 1999)

No. 53 – New England Patriots
- Position: Linebacker
- Roster status: Active

Personal information
- Born: January 2, 1999 (age 27); Rochester Hills, Michigan, U.S.
- Listed height: 6 ft 2 in (1.88 m)
- Listed weight: 231 lb (105 kg)

Career information
- High school: Valor Christian (Highlands Ranch, Colorado)
- College: Idaho (2017–2020)
- NFL draft: 2021: undrafted

Career history
- Minnesota Vikings (2021)*; Philadelphia Eagles (2021)*; San Francisco 49ers (2021)*; Philadelphia Eagles (2021–2023); New England Patriots (2023–present)
- * Offseason or practice squad member only

Career NFL statistics as of Week 7, 2026
- Total tackles: 262
- Sacks: 2.5
- Forced fumbles: 3
- Fumble recoveries: 1
- Interceptions: 1
- Pass deflections: 9
- Stats at Pro Football Reference

Christian John Elliss (born January 2, 1999) is an American professional football linebacker for the New England Patriots of the National Football League (NFL). He played college football for the Idaho Vandals and was originally signed as an undrafted free agent by the Minnesota Vikings. He is the son of former Detroit Lions defensive tackle Luther Elliss and has three brothers that also play in the NFL: Kaden, Noah, and Jonah.

== Early life ==
Elliss was born on January 2, 1999, in Rochester Hills, Michigan, to Luther and Rebecca Elliss. He was the third-oldest of 12 children. He attended high school at Valor Christian, leading his team to the state final as a senior, and earning the South Metro co-Defensive Player of the Year award. Following high school, Elliss accepted a scholarship offer from University of Idaho.

== College career ==
As a true freshman in 2017, playing for the Idaho Vandals football team, Elliss played in eleven games, recording 30 tackles and one interception. He gained a starting position as a sophomore, playing in all eleven games as a starter at the middle linebacker position. He led the team with 81 tackles and was named All-Big Sky. He changed to outside linebacker as a junior, starting all eleven games and earning first-team All-Big Sky honors. He led the team with 4.5 sacks and placed second with 104 tackles. The 2020 season was canceled, but later a spring 2021 schedule was announced. In a shortened 2021 season with five games, Elliss made 50 tackles and was selected to first-team All-Big Sky for the second consecutive season.

== Professional career ==
Pre-draft measurables
| Height | Weight | Arm length | Hand span | Wingspan | 40-yard dash | 10-yard split | 20-yard split | 20-yard shuttle | Three-cone drill | Vertical jump | Broad jump | Bench press |
|---|---|---|---|---|---|---|---|---|---|---|---|---|
| 6 ft 1 3/4 in (1.87 m) | 228 lb (103 kg) | 31 3/4 in (0.81 m) | 9 1/2 in (0.24 m) | 6 ft 3 1/2 in (1.92 m) | 4.58 s | 1.63 s | 2.63 s | 4.29 s | 6.94 s | 35.5 in (0.90 m) | 10 ft 0 in (3.05 m) | 22 reps |
All values from Pro Day

=== Minnesota Vikings ===
Following the 2021 NFL draft, where Elliss went unselected, he was signed as an undrafted free agent by the Minnesota Vikings. Following a preseason game, he was fined $3,731 for an unnecessary roughness penalty. He was released two days later on August 23.

=== Philadelphia Eagles (first stint) ===
Elliss was signed to the practice squad of the Philadelphia Eagles on September 9. He was released on October 6, but re-signed with the practice squad five days later. He was released on October 18.

=== San Francisco 49ers ===
On November 3, 2021, Elliss was signed to the San Francisco 49ers practice squad, but was released a week later.

=== Philadelphia Eagles (second stint) ===
Elliss was re-signed to the practice squad of the Eagles on November 24. Elliss made his NFL debut on January 8, 2022, in the Eagles' week 18 game against the Dallas Cowboys, collecting 3 combined tackles in the 51–26 loss. He signed a reserve/future contract with the Eagles on January 18, 2022.

On August 30, 2022, Elliss was waived by the Eagles and signed to the practice squad the next day. He was elevated to the active roster for their week thirteen game against the Tennessee Titans, and was a key player on special teams, making five total tackles and helping block for punt returner Britain Covey as he had the second-best single-game return average on the season. He was signed to the active roster on December 23. Elliss finished the 2022 regular season with six games played and 11 total tackles.

Elliss was waived by the Eagles on December 6, 2023, following the signing of Shaquille Leonard.

=== New England Patriots ===
On December 7, 2023, Elliss was claimed off waivers by the New England Patriots.

The following year, Elliss contributed to the Patriots, starting 6 games after Ja'Whaun Bentley's injury. Throughout the year, he racked up a career-high 80 tackles, 1.5 sacks, 5 passes defended, and an interception against Indianapolis Colts quarterback Anthony Richardson.

On March 24, 2025, the New England Patriots matched an offer sheet from the Las Vegas Raiders to retain Elliss on a two-year, $13.5 million contract. He had three total tackles in Super Bowl LX, a 29–13 loss to the Seattle Seahawks.

== NFL career statistics ==
Legend
| **Bold** | Career high |

=== Regular season ===
| Year | Team | Games | | Tackles | | | | | Interceptions | | | | | | Fumbles | | | | |
| Year | Team | GP | GS | Cmb | Solo | Ast | Sck | TFL | Int | Yds | Avg | Lng | TD | PD | FF | Fmb | FR | Yds | TD |
|---|---|---|---|---|---|---|---|---|---|---|---|---|---|---|---|---|---|---|---|
| 2021 | PHI | 1 | 0 | 3 | 2 | 1 | 0.0 | 0 | 0 | 0 | 0.0 | 0 | 0 | 0 | 0 | 0 | 0 | 0 | 0 |
| 2022 | PHI | 6 | 0 | 11 | 9 | 2 | 0.0 | 0 | 0 | 0 | 0.0 | 0 | 0 | 0 | 0 | 0 | 0 | 0 | 0 |
| 2023 | PHI | 12 | 1 | 21 | 13 | 8 | 0.0 | **2** | 0 | 0 | 0.0 | 0 | 0 | 0 | 0 | 0 | 0 | 0 | 0 |
| 2023 | NE | 4 | 0 | 2 | 2 | 0 | 0.0 | 0 | 0 | 0 | 0.0 | 0 | 0 | 0 | 0 | 0 | 0 | 0 | 0 |
| 2024 | NE | 16 | 5 | 80 | **42** | 38 | **1.5** | 1 | **1** | **6** | **6.0** | **6** | 0 | **5** | **1** | 0 | **1** | 0 | 0 |
| 2025 | NE | 15 | 13 | **94** | 39 | **55** | 0.0 | 0 | 0 | 0 | 0.0 | 0 | 0 | 3 | **1** | 0 | 0 | 0 | 0 |
| 2026 | NE | 7 | 7 | 51 | 29 | 22 | 1.0 | **2** | 0 | 0 | 0.0 | 0 | 0 | 1 | **1** | 0 | 0 | 0 | 0 |
| Career | | 61 | 26 | 262 | 136 | 126 | 2.5 | 5 | 1 | 6 | 6.0 | 6 | 0 | 9 | 3 | 0 | 1 | 0 | 0 |

=== Postseason ===
| Year | Team | Games | | Tackles | | | | | Interceptions | | | | | | Fumbles | | | | |
| Year | Team | GP | GS | Cmb | Solo | Ast | Sck | TFL | Int | Yds | Avg | Lng | TD | PD | FF | Fmb | FR | Yds | TD |
|---|---|---|---|---|---|---|---|---|---|---|---|---|---|---|---|---|---|---|---|
| 2022 | PHI | 3 | 0 | 1 | 1 | 0 | 0.0 | 0 | 0 | 0 | 0.0 | 0 | 0 | 0 | 0 | 0 | 0 | 0 | 0 |
| 2025 | NE | 4 | 2 | **19** | **9** | **10** | **1.0** | **2** | 0 | 0 | 0.0 | 0 | 0 | **2** | **1** | 0 | **1** | 0 | 0 |
| Career | | 7 | 2 | 20 | 10 | 10 | 1.0 | 2 | 0 | 0 | 0.0 | 0 | 0 | 2 | 1 | 0 | 1 | 0 | 0 |

== Personal life ==
Elliss is of Samoan descent. His brothers Kaden, Noah, and Jonah also played in the National Football League (NFL). Elliss is married to former Idaho soccer player Kaysie Bruce.

== See also ==
- List of second-generation National Football League players
