= Ellia =

Given name list

Ellia is a given name. Notable people with the name include:

- Ellia English (born 1960), American singer and actress
- Ellia Green (born 1993), Australian rugby union and rugby league footballer
- Ellia Smeding (born 1998), British long track speed skater
- Ellia Perdue (born 2005), Canadian Singer/Songwriter
