= Jonah Elliss =

American football player (born 2003)

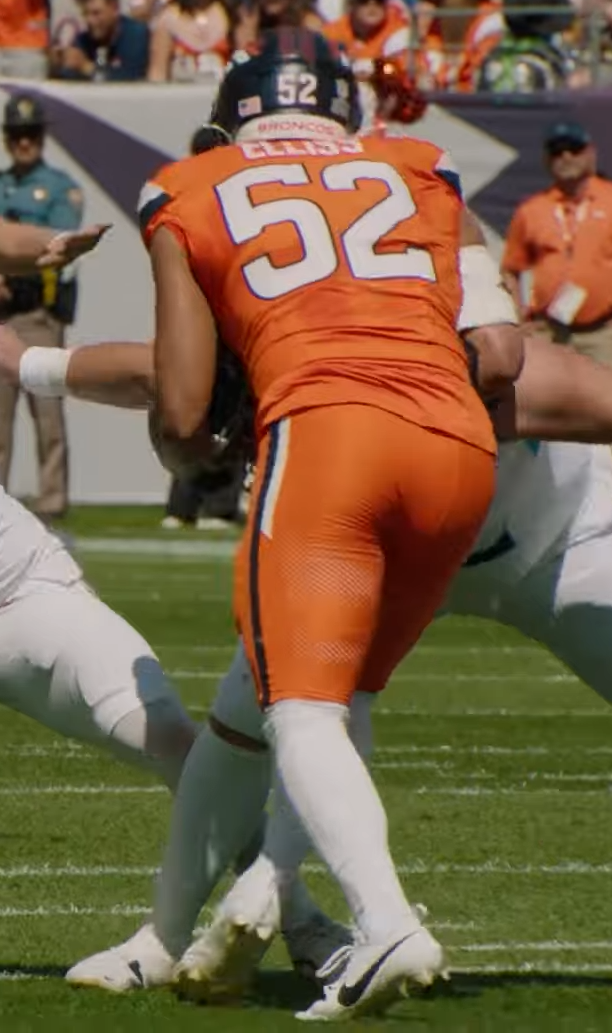
- Elliss with the Denver Broncos in 2025

No. 52 – Denver Broncos
- Position: Outside linebacker
- Roster status: Injured reserve

Personal information
- Born: April 3, 2003 (age 23); Rochester Hills, Michigan, U.S.
- Listed height: 6 ft 2 in (1.88 m)
- Listed weight: 246 lb (112 kg)

Career information
- High school: Moscow Senior (Moscow, Idaho)
- College: Utah (2021–2023)
- NFL draft: 2024: 3rd round, 76th overall pick

Career history
- Denver Broncos (2024–present)

Awards and highlights
- PFWA All-Rookie Team (2024); Consensus All-American (2023); First-team All-Pac-12 (2023)

Career NFL statistics as of 2025
- Total tackles: 66
- Sacks: 7.5
- Forced fumbles: 1
- Pass deflections: 3
- Stats at Pro Football Reference

Jonah Elliss (born April 3, 2003) is an American professional football outside linebacker for the Denver Broncos of the National Football League (NFL). He played college football for the Utah Utes. He is the son of former Utes great and Detroit Lions defensive tackle Luther Elliss. Three of his brothers have also played in the NFL: Kaden, Christian, and Noah.

== Early life ==
Elliss was born in Rochester Hills, Michigan. He was raised in Utah, Colorado, and Idaho. He attended Moscow High School. He was named the Inland Empire League Player of the Year as a senior. Elliss was rated a three-star recruit and committed to play college football at Utah.

== College career ==
Elliss played in all 14 of the Utah Utes games during his freshman season and recorded 15 tackles. In 2022, his father Luther was hired by Utah and became his position coach. He was named honorable mention All-Pac-12 Conference after recording 26 tackles with six tackles for loss and three sacks as a sophomore.

== Professional career ==
Pre-draft measurables
Height	Weight	Arm length	Hand span	Wingspan	20-yard shuttle	Three-cone drill	Vertical jump	Broad jump
6 ft 2 1/8 in (1.88 m)	248 lb (112 kg)	33 in (0.84 m)	10 1/2 in (0.27 m)	6 ft 7 1/4 in (2.01 m)	4.17 s	6.69 s	38.0 in (0.97 m)	10 ft 0 in (3.05 m)
All values from NFL Combine/Pro Day

Elliss was selected by the Denver Broncos in the third round, 76th overall, in the 2024 NFL draft. During the 2024 season, Elliss recorded five sacks, the third most of any rookie in the league. He was later selected to the 2024 PFWA All-Rookie Team. In Denver's Wild Card loss against the Buffalo Bills, Elliss suffered a fractured scapula.

His production declined in 2025 as he battled injury throughout the season, recording 28 tackles, two and a half sacks, five tackles-for-loss, a forced fumble, and a pass deflection. He faced his brother Christian when the Broncos played the New England Patriots in the AFC Championship Game. After the Broncos lost the game, the two brothers were seen embracing each other.

During the 2026 offseason, head coach Sean Payton announced that Elliss would begin to take significant snaps at inside linebacker rather than outside during the upcoming season. On October 24, Elliss was placed on injured reserve after injuring his ankle during a Week 6 game against the Seattle Seahawks.

== Personal life ==
Elliss's father, Luther Elliss, played defensive tackle in the NFL for 10 seasons. Three of his older brothers, Kaden, Christian, and Noah played football at Idaho and currently play in the NFL. Elliss married his college sweetheart, Kasey Elliss, in 2025.

== See also ==
- List of second-generation National Football League players
