= Kaden Elliss =

American football player (born 1995)

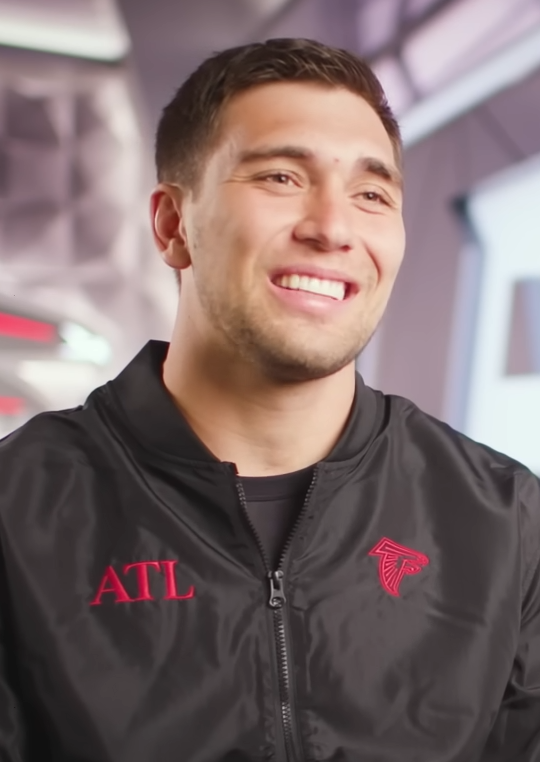
- Elliss in 2023

No. 55 – New Orleans Saints
- Position: Linebacker
- Roster status: Active

Personal information
- Born: July 10, 1995 (age 31); Salt Lake City, Utah, U.S.
- Listed height: 6 ft 2 in (1.88 m)
- Listed weight: 240 lb (109 kg)

Career information
- High school: Judge Memorial Catholic (Salt Lake City)
- College: Idaho (2014–2018)
- NFL draft: 2019: 7th round, 244th overall pick

Career history
- New Orleans Saints (2019–2022); Atlanta Falcons (2023–2025); New Orleans Saints (2026–present)

Awards and highlights
- Second-team All-Sun Belt (2017)

Career NFL statistics as of Week 10, 2026
- Total tackles: 537
- Sacks: 22.5
- Forced fumbles: 4
- Fumble recoveries: 2
- Pass deflections: 16
- Interceptions: 2
- Stats at Pro Football Reference

Luther Kaden Elliss (born July 10, 1995) is an American professional football linebacker for the New Orleans Saints of the National Football League (NFL). The son of former Detroit Lions defensive tackle Luther Elliss, he played college football for the Idaho Vandals, and has three younger brothers that also play professional football: Christian, Noah, and Jonah.

== Professional career ==
Pre-draft measurables
Height	Weight	Arm length	Hand span	Wingspan	40-yard dash	10-yard split	20-yard split	20-yard shuttle	Three-cone drill	Vertical jump	Broad jump	Bench press
6 ft 2 1/4 in (1.89 m)	238 lb (108 kg)	32 3/4 in (0.83 m)	10 1/2 in (0.27 m)	6 ft 7 1/2 in (2.02 m)	4.71 s	1.60 s	2.82 s	4.13 s	6.63 s	34.5 in (0.88 m)	10 ft 0 in (3.05 m)	20 reps
All values from Pro Day

=== New Orleans Saints ===
The New Orleans Saints selected Elliss in the seventh round (244th overall) of the 2019 NFL draft. Elliss was the 30th linebacker drafted in 2019.

On May 10, 2019, the New Orleans Saints signed Elliss to a four-year, $2.59 million contract that includes a signing bonus of $76,316. During training camp, Elliss competed for a roster spot as a backup linebacker against Vince Biegel, Porter Gustin, Josh Martin, Darnell Sankey, and Colton Jumper. Head coach Sean Payton named Elliss the primary backup middle linebacker, behind starter Alex Anzalone, to begin the regular season. On September 25, 2019, he was placed on injured reserve with a knee injury.

Elliss was placed on the reserve/COVID-19 list by the team on August 6, 2020, and was activated the next day.

=== Atlanta Falcons ===
On March 13, 2023, the Atlanta Falcons signed Elliss to a three-year, $21.50 million contract that includes $10.16 million guaranteed upon signing and a signing bonus of $5.25 million.

=== New Orleans Saints (second stint) ===
On March 11, 2026, Elliss signed a three-year, $33 million contract with the New Orleans Saints.

== NFL career statistics ==
Legend
**Bold**	Career high

=== Regular season ===
Year	Team	Games		Tackles					Interceptions						Fumbles				
Year	Team	GP	GS	Cmb	Solo	Ast	Sck	TFL	Int	Yds	Avg	Lng	TD	PD	FF	Fum	FR	Yds	TD
2019	NO	3	0	1	0	1	0.0	0	0	0	0.0	0	0	0	0	0	0	0	0
2020	NO	15	0	5	4	1	0.0	0	0	0	0.0	0	0	0	0	0	0	0	0
2021	NO	13	1	17	9	8	1.0	1	0	0	0.0	0	0	0	0	0	**1**	0	0
2022	NO	17	11	78	43	35	**7.0**	7	0	0	0.0	0	0	2	**2**	0	0	0	0
2023	ATL	17	17	122	82	40	4.0	**11**	0	0	0.0	0	0	3	0	0	0	0	0
2024	ATL	17	17	**151**	**85**	**66**	5.0	8	**1**	12	12.0	12	0	3	1	0	**1**	0	0
2025	ATL	17	17	107	59	48	3.5	10	**1**	**16**	**16.0**	**16**	0	**6**	1	0	0	0	0
2026	NO	6	6	56	29	27	2.0	6	0	0	0.0	0	0	2	0	0	0	0	0
Career		105	69	537	311	226	22.5	43	2	28	14.0	16	0	16	4	0	2	0	0

=== Postseason ===
Year	Team	Games		Tackles					Interceptions						Fumbles				
Year	Team	GP	GS	Cmb	Solo	Ast	Sck	TFL	Int	Yds	Avg	Lng	TD	PD	FF	Fum	FR	Yds	TD
2020	NO	2	0	0	0	0	0.0	0	0	0	0.0	0	0	0	0	0	0	0	0
Career		2	0	0	0	0	0.0	0	0	0	0.0	0	0	0	0	0	0	0	0

== Personal life ==
Kaden Elliss is one of 12 children of Luther Elliss, a former defensive tackle in the NFL, and Rebecca Elliss. His brothers, Noah and Christian, both played football at Idaho and currently play in the NFL. His younger brother, Jonah, currently plays football for the Denver Broncos after playing at the University of Utah. He is of Samoan descent.

Born and raised in Salt Lake City, Utah, Elliss is a Christian. He has said, "My faith is the most important part of my life. I'm a Christian. I believe in Jesus Christ; that he died and rose from the dead. Honestly, without that, I wouldn't be who I am. That's what makes me tick, honestly."

== See also ==
- List of second-generation National Football League players
