= Noah Elliss =

American football player (born 1999)

Profile
- Position: Defensive tackle

Personal information
- Born: March 31, 1999 (age 27); Highlands Ranch, Colorado, U.S.
- Listed height: 6 ft 4 in (1.93 m)
- Listed weight: 346 lb (157 kg)

Career information
- High school: Valor Christian (Highlands Ranch)
- College: Idaho (2019–2021)
- NFL draft: 2022: undrafted

Career history
- Philadelphia Eagles (2022–2023)
- Stats at Pro Football Reference

Noah Elliss (born March 31, 1999) is an American professional football defensive tackle. He played college football at Idaho and was signed by the Philadelphia Eagles as an undrafted free agent after the 2022 NFL draft. He is the son of former Detroit Lions defensive tackle Luther Elliss and has three brothers that also play football: Kaden, Christian, and Jonah.

== Early life ==
Elliss grew up in Highlands Ranch, Colorado and attended Valor Christian High School where he registered 104 tackles, 27 tackles for loss, 11.5 sacks, and one forced fumble in two seasons.

== College career ==
Elliss was rated a four-star recruit and committed to play college football at Mississippi State. Elliss was later ruled academically ineligible to play college football, and after the departure of Mississippi State's defensive line coach, Brian Baker, he opted to enroll at the University of Idaho, where his father was coaching. Elliss was not eligible to play for the Vandals until 2019. He suffered a torn ACL and a torn MCL early in his first season playing. Elliss played in all six of the Vandals' games during his redshirt junior season, which was shortened and played in the spring of 2021 due to the COVID-19 pandemic in the United States. As a redshirt senior, he played in 10 games and finished the season with 46 tackles, 6.5 tackles for loss, one sack, and one fumble recovery. Following the end of the season, Elliss declared that he would be entering the 2022 NFL draft.

Statistics
Season	GP	TKL	TFL	SCK	INT	FF	FR
2019	5	11	0.5	0	0	0	0
2020	6	18	1.5	1	0	0	0
2021	10	46	6.5	1	1	0	1
Career	21	57	3	2	0	0	1

== Professional career ==
Pre-draft measurables
Height	Weight	Arm length	Hand span	Wingspan	40-yard dash	10-yard split	20-yard split
6 ft 4 1/4 in (1.94 m)	346 lb (157 kg)	32 1/4 in (0.82 m)	10 3/8 in (0.26 m)	6 ft 6 3/8 in (1.99 m)	5.66 s	1.88 s	3.13 s
All values from NFL Combine

On April 30, 2022, Ellis signed as an undrafted free agent with the Philadelphia Eagles following the 2022 NFL Draft. He was waived on July 26, and placed on the reserve/non-football injury list.

On August 19, 2023, Elliss was waived/injured by the Eagles and placed on injured reserve. He was released on August 28. Eliss was then signed to the Eagles practice squad on October 24. He signed a reserve/future contract with Philadelphia on January 18, 2024. Ellis was waived by Philadelphia on April 30.

== Personal life ==
Elliss's father, Luther Elliss, played defensive tackle in the NFL for 10 seasons. His two older brothers, Kaden and Christian, both played football at Idaho and currently play in the NFL. His younger brother, Jonah, currently plays football for the Denver Broncos.

== See also ==
- List of second-generation National Football League players
