= Luther Elliss =

American football player and coach (born 1973)

Utah Utes
- Title: Defensive tackles coach

Personal information
- Born: March 22, 1973 (age 53); Mancos, Colorado, U.S.
- Listed height: 6 ft 5 in (1.96 m)
- Listed weight: 318 lb (144 kg)

Career information
- High school: Mancos
- College: Utah
- NFL draft: 1995: 1st round, 20th overall pick

Career history

Playing
- Detroit Lions (1995–2003); Denver Broncos (2004)

Coaching
- Idaho (2017–2021) Defensive line coach; Utah (2022–present) Defensive tackles coach

Awards and highlights
- 2× Pro Bowl (1999, 2000); Consensus All-American (1994); WAC Defensive Player of the Year (1994); 3× First-team All-WAC (1992–1994)

Career NFL statistics
- Tackles: 331
- Sacks: 29
- Forced fumbles: 4
- Fumble recoveries: 7
- Defensive touchdowns: 1
- Stats at Pro Football Reference

Luther John Elliss (born March 22, 1973) is an American former professional football player who was a defensive tackle for 10 seasons in the National Football League (NFL). He played college football for the Utah Utes and was recognized as a consensus All-American. Selected in the first round of the 1995 NFL draft, Elliss played professionally for the Detroit Lions and Denver Broncos of the NFL and was a two-time Pro Bowler. He worked as the defensive line coach at Idaho from 2017 until being named defensive tackles coach at Utah in 2022. He has five sons that also play football: Kaden, Christian, Noah, Jonah, and Elijah.

== Early life ==
Elliss was born in Mancos, Colorado. He attended Mancos High School, and played for the Mancos Blue Jays high school football and basketball teams. He is of Samoan descent.

== College career ==
Elliss received an athletic scholarship to attend the University of Utah and played for the Utah Utes football team as a defensive lineman from 1991 to 1994. He chose Utah since head football coach Ron McBride told him that he could also play on the basketball team under coach Rick Majerus. After one season he decided to play football full-time. He was a first-team All-Western Athletic Conference (WAC) selection in 1992, 1993 and 1994. As a senior in 1994, he was recognized as a consensus first-team All American and was named the WAC Defensive Player of the Year.

== Professional career ==
Pre-draft measurables
Height	Weight	Arm length	Hand span
6 ft 4 7/8 in (1.95 m)	291 lb (132 kg)	33 7/8 in (0.86 m)	10 5/8 in (0.27 m)

The Detroit Lions selected Elliss in the first round (20th pick overall) of the 1995 NFL Draft. He played for the Lions from 1995 to 2003. His nickname during his time in Detroit was "Pass Rushing Luther," and earned it with 324 tackles and 27.0 quarterback sacks with the Lions. The Lions released him after appearing in only five games in 2003. He played his final season with the Denver Broncos in 2004, seeing action in eight games and registering two sacks.

In his ten-season NFL career, he played in 134 regular season games, started 119 of them, and compiled 331 tackles, 29.0 sacks, seven fumble recoveries, four forced fumbles, and four deflected passes. He was a Pro Bowl selection in 1999 and 2000.

== NFL career statistics ==
Year	Team	GP	Tackles				Fumbles			
Year	Team	GP	Cmb	Solo	Ast	Sck	FF	FR	Yds	TD
1995	DET	16	19	9	10	0.0	0	0	0	0
1996	DET	14	49	26	23	6.5	0	0	0	0
1997	DET	16	59	35	24	8.5	0	2	0	0
1998	DET	16	49	37	12	3.0	0	1	0	0
1999	DET	15	45	29	16	3.5	3	2	11	1
2000	DET	16	39	23	16	3.0	0	2	3	0
2001	DET	14	30	25	5	0.0	1	0	0	0
2002	DET	14	25	18	7	2.5	1	0	0	0
2003	DET	5	0	0	0	0.0	0	0	0	0
2004	DEN	8	7	6	1	2.0	0	0	0	0
Career		134	322	208	114	29.0	5	7	14	1

== Coaching career ==
Elliss spent two seasons as the team chaplain for the Denver Broncos of the NFL. On February 27, 2017, Elliss was announced as the new defensive line coach for the Idaho Vandals football team under head coach Paul Petrino. Elliss has been the defensive tackle coach for the Utah Utes Football team under Kyle Whittingham since January 19, 2022.

== Personal life ==
Elliss and his wife, Rebecca, have 12 children – seven of whom are adopted. His sons Christian, Kaden and Noah played football for Idaho while his sons Jonah and Elijah play (or played) football for Utah. In 2019, his son Kaden Elliss was drafted by the New Orleans Saints. In the 2021 NFL draft his son Christian Elliss went undrafted but was later signed as a UDFA by the Minnesota Vikings. Christian was also Sports Illustrated's secret "Prospect X" for the 2021 draft. In 2022, Noah went undrafted and was signed as an UDFA by the Philadelphia Eagles. His son, Jonah, played football for Utah and was drafted by the Denver Broncos in 2024.

Elliss is a former resident of Oakland Township, Michigan, in suburban Detroit.
