= 2022–23 NFL playoffs =

American football tournament

- Dates: January 14 – February 12, 2023
- Season: 2022
- Teams: 14
- Games played: 13
- Super Bowl LVII site: State Farm Stadium; Glendale, Arizona
- Defending champions: Los Angeles Rams (did not qualify)
- Champion: Kansas City Chiefs (3rd title)
- Runner-up: Philadelphia Eagles
- Conference runners-up: Cincinnati Bengals; San Francisco 49ers
NFL playoffs
← 2021–22	2023–24 →

The National Football League playoffs for the 2022 season began on January 14, 2023, and concluded with Super Bowl LVII on February 12 at State Farm Stadium in Glendale, Arizona, where the Kansas City Chiefs defeated the Philadelphia Eagles.

This was the first postseason under a new rule in which both teams will be assured one possession in overtime, even if the first team with possession scores a touchdown. However, no game went into overtime.

With Jacksonville and Kansas City facing each other in the AFC Divisional Round, Kansas City became the fourth team in NFL history (the other three being the Los Angeles Rams, Philadelphia, and Buffalo) to face every team within their respective conference in the postseason at least once.

== Participants ==
Within each conference, the four division winners and the top three non-division winners with the best overall regular season records qualified for the playoffs. The four division winners are seeded 1–4 based on their overall won-lost-tied record, and the wild card teams are seeded 5–7. The NFL does not use a fixed bracket playoff system, and there are no restrictions regarding teams from the same division matching up in any round. In the first round, dubbed the Wild Card playoffs, the second-seeded division winner hosts the seventh seed wild card, the third seed hosts the sixth seed, and the fourth seed hosts the fifth seed. The 1 seed from each conference receives a first-round bye. In the second round, the Divisional playoffs, the number 1 seed hosts the lowest-seeded surviving team from the first round (seed 4, 5, 6, or 7), while the other two surviving teams play each other, with the higher-seeded team hosting. The two surviving teams from each conference's divisional playoff games then meet in the respective AFC and NFC Conference Championships, hosted by the higher seed. Although the Super Bowl, the championship round of the playoffs, is played at a neutral site, the designated home team is based on an annual rotation by conference.

Playoff seeds
Seed	AFC	NFC
1	Kansas City Chiefs (West winner)	Philadelphia Eagles (East winner)
2	Buffalo Bills (East winner)	San Francisco 49ers (West winner)
3	Cincinnati Bengals (North winner)	Minnesota Vikings (North winner)
4	Jacksonville Jaguars (South winner)	Tampa Bay Buccaneers (South winner)
5	Los Angeles Chargers (wild card)	Dallas Cowboys (wild card)
6	Baltimore Ravens (wild card)	New York Giants (wild card)
7	Miami Dolphins (wild card)	Seattle Seahawks (wild card)

=== Unused format changes following Week 17 canceled Bills–Bengals game ===
During the Week 17 game on January 2 between the Buffalo Bills and Cincinnati Bengals, Buffalo safety Damar Hamlin collapsed and remained motionless after making a tackle on Cincinnati wide receiver Tee Higgins. At the time of Hamlin's collapse, there was 5:58 remaining in the first quarter with Cincinnati leading 7–3. It was later revealed that he had suffered cardiac arrest and was in critical condition. The remainder of the game was then postponed for the rest of the night, and on the following day, the NFL initially said that it would not be resumed that week. Then on January 5, the league announced that the game would be canceled entirely, and both teams would finish the regular season with only 16 regular season games, saying that it was "difficult, but necessary" under the "extraordinary circumstances".

The cancellation of the Bills–Bengals game, however, affected the playoff implications involving four teams: the Bills, Bengals, Kansas City Chiefs, and Baltimore Ravens. Going into the game, Cincinnati held an 11–4 record and only needed a win to clinch the AFC North division title over Baltimore (which was 10–6 after finishing their week 17 game and losing the conference record tiebreaker to the 10–6 Los Angeles Chargers for wild card seeding). The Bengals and the 12–3 Bills were also both fighting the 13–3 Chiefs for the top seed in the AFC.

Had Buffalo won the canceled game to go to 13–3, and both the Bills and Chiefs then ended the regular season at 14–3, Buffalo would have held the head-to-head victory tiebreaker over Kansas City. In addition, a Cincinnati loss to go to 11–5 would have resulted in the AFC North championship being decided by the Week 18 Ravens–Bengals game, with Baltimore having the head-to-head victory tiebreaker if both teams finished at 11–6. Had Cincinnati won the canceled game instead, not only would have they clinched their division title, but the Bengals would have held head-to-head victory tiebreakers over both the Bills and Chiefs if all three clubs ended at 13–4.

The league confirmed that to determine playoff matchups, seeding would still be determined by winning percentage, which the NFL has always formally used to rank teams. By canceling the game, the Bengals automatically clinched the AFC North division championship based on winning percentage. The Chiefs were then put into a position in Week 18 to clinch the AFC top seed with a win to go to 14–3, or for the Bills to finish at 12–4 with a loss.

Therefore during a special league meeting on January 6, NFL owners approved the following changes for this postseason to compensate for the missing aforementioned playoff implications of the canceled game:

- The AFC Championship Game would be held at a neutral site in the three circumstances:
  - Buffalo and Kansas City both win or tie in Week 18, and both teams advance to the AFC Championship.
  - Buffalo and Kansas City both lose and Cincinnati loses or ties in Week 18, and both Buffalo and Kansas City advance to the AFC Championship.
  - Buffalo and Kansas City both lose and Cincinnati wins in Week 18, and Kansas City and either Buffalo or Cincinnati advance to the AFC Championship.

The site of the Wild Card game between Baltimore and Cincinnati would be determined by coin flip if:

- Baltimore and the Los Angeles Chargers both won in Week 18.

After Week 18 was played, only the first scenario—caused by wins by both Buffalo and Kansas City—could happen. Meanwhile, Cincinnati won their game against Baltimore. The league then announced on January 12 that Mercedes-Benz Stadium in Atlanta was selected to host a Buffalo–Kansas City AFC Championship Game if both teams advanced that far. This plan went unused after the Bengals defeated the Bills in the Divisional Playoffs by the score of 27–10.

=== New postseason overtime rule ===
As approved by NFL owners at their meeting on March 28, 2022, this is the first postseason in which both teams are assured of one possession in overtime, even if the first team with possession scores a touchdown. This change was made in response to several recent games in both the regular season and the postseason in which the first team to possess the ball in overtime scored a touchdown and the other team did not have a chance to respond.

== Bracket ==
Jan 15 – Paycor Stadium	Jan 22 – Highmark Stadium
6	Baltimore	17
3	Cincinnati	24
3	Cincinnati	27
Jan 29 – Arrowhead Stadium
Jan 15 – Highmark Stadium	2	Buffalo	10
AFC
7	Miami	31	3	Cincinnati	20
Jan 21 – Arrowhead Stadium
2	Buffalo	34	1	Kansas City	23
AFC Championship
Jan 14 – TIAA Bank Field	4	Jacksonville	20
1	Kansas City	27
5	LA Chargers	30
Divisional round	Feb 12 – State Farm Stadium
4	Jacksonville	31
Wild-card round
A1	Kansas City	38
Jan 16 – Raymond James Stadium	Jan 22 – Levi's Stadium	N1	Philadelphia	35
Super Bowl LVII
5	Dallas	31
4	Tampa Bay	14
5	Dallas	12
Jan 29 – Lincoln Financial Field
Jan 14 – Levi's Stadium	2	San Francisco	19
NFC
7	Seattle	23	2	San Francisco	7
Jan 21 – Lincoln Financial Field
2	San Francisco	41	1	Philadelphia	31
NFC Championship
Jan 15 – U.S. Bank Stadium	6	NY Giants	7
1	Philadelphia	38
6	NY Giants	31
3	Minnesota	24

== Schedule ==
The playoffs began on January 14–16, 2023 with the Wild-Card Round, with three wild-card games played in each conference. In the Divisional Round, played January 21–22, the top seed in the conference played the lowest remaining seed and the other two remaining teams played each other. The winners of those games advanced to the Conference Championship Games which were played on January 29. Super Bowl LVII was played on February 12 at State Farm Stadium in Glendale, Arizona.

Round	Away team	Score	Home team	Date	Kickoff (ET / UTC–5)	Network	Viewers (millions)	TV rating
Wild-card round	Seattle Seahawks	23–41	San Francisco 49ers	January 14, 2023	4:35 p.m.	Fox	27.5	13.5
Wild-card round	Los Angeles Chargers	30–31	Jacksonville Jaguars	January 14, 2023	8:15 p.m.	NBC	20.6	10.5
Wild-card round	Miami Dolphins	31–34	Buffalo Bills	January 15, 2023	1:05 p.m.	CBS	30.9	16.1
Wild-card round	New York Giants	31–24	Minnesota Vikings	January 15, 2023	4:40 p.m.	Fox	33.2	16.3
Wild-card round	Baltimore Ravens	17–24	Cincinnati Bengals	January 15, 2023	8:15 p.m.	NBC	28.6	13.8
Wild-card round	Dallas Cowboys	31–14	Tampa Bay Buccaneers	January 16, 2023	8:15 p.m.	ABC/ESPN	31.2	16.5
Divisional round	Jacksonville Jaguars	20–27	Kansas City Chiefs	January 21, 2023	4:35 p.m.	NBC	34.3	16.0
Divisional round	New York Giants	7–38	Philadelphia Eagles	January 21, 2023	8:15 p.m.	Fox	28.6	13.6
Divisional round	Cincinnati Bengals	27–10	Buffalo Bills	January 22, 2023	3:05 p.m.	CBS	39.3	20.1
Divisional round	Dallas Cowboys	12–19	San Francisco 49ers	January 22, 2023	6:40 p.m.	Fox	45.6	21.8
Conference championships	San Francisco 49ers	7–31	Philadelphia Eagles	January 29, 2023	3:05 p.m.	Fox	47.5	22.7
Conference championships	Cincinnati Bengals	20–23	Kansas City Chiefs	January 29, 2023	6:40 p.m.	CBS	53.1	25.5
Super Bowl LVII State Farm Stadium Glendale, Arizona	Kansas City Chiefs	38–35	Philadelphia Eagles	February 12, 2023	6:40 p.m.	Fox	115.1	40.0

== Wild-card round ==
=== Saturday, January 14, 2023 ===
==== NFC: San Francisco 49ers 41, Seattle Seahawks 23 ====
Seattle Seahawks vs. San Francisco 49ers – Game summary

Quarter	1	2	3	4	Total
Seahawks	0	17	0	6	23
49ers	10	6	7	18	41

at Levi's Stadium, Santa Clara, California

- Date: January 14
- Game time: 1:35 p.m. PST
- Game weather: Rain, 57 °F (14 °C)
- Game attendance: 71,299
- Referee: Alex Kemp
- TV announcers (Fox): Joe Davis, Daryl Johnston, Pam Oliver, and Kristina Pink
- Recap, Game Book

Game information

First quarter

- SF – Robbie Gould 34-yard field goal, 10:13. 49ers 3–0. Drive: 7 plays, 48 yards, 2:22.
- SF – Christian McCaffrey 3-yard pass from Brock Purdy (Robbie Gould kick), 5:11. 49ers 10–0. Drive: 5 plays, 85 yards, 2:51.

Second quarter

- SEA – Kenneth Walker III 7-yard run (Jason Myers kick), 13:14. 49ers 10–7. Drive: 14 plays, 78 yards, 6:57.
- SF – Robbie Gould 33-yard field goal, 7:41. 49ers 13–7. Drive: 10 plays, 60 yards, 5:33.
- SEA – DK Metcalf 50-yard pass from Geno Smith (Jason Myers kick), 5:01. Seahawks 14–13. Drive: 5 plays, 71 yards, 2:40.
- SF – Robbie Gould 46-yard field goal, 0:13. 49ers 16–14. Drive: 8 plays, 49 yards, 0:55.
- SEA – Jason Myers 56-yard field goal, 0:00. Seahawks 17–16. Drive: 2 plays, 24 yards, 0:13.

Third quarter

- SF – Brock Purdy 1-yard run (Robbie Gould kick), 7:15. 49ers 23–17. Drive: 13 plays, 75 yards, 7:45.

Fourth quarter

- SF – Elijah Mitchell 7-yard pass from Brock Purdy (Brock Purdy–George Kittle pass), 14:02. 49ers 31–17. Drive: 7 plays, 70 yards, 3:23.
- SF – Deebo Samuel 74-yard pass from Brock Purdy (Robbie Gould kick), 10:51. 49ers 38–17. Drive: 2 plays, 76 yards, 0:54.
- SF – Robbie Gould 31-yard field goal, 4:56. 49ers 41–17. Drive: 10 plays, 24 yards, 5:49.
- SEA – DK Metcalf 3-yard pass from Geno Smith (pass failed), 1:48. 49ers 41–23. Drive: 15 plays, 76 yards, 3:08.

Top passers

- SEA – Geno Smith – 25/35, 253 yards, 2 TD, INT
- SF – Brock Purdy – 18/30, 332 yards, 3 TD

Top rushers

- SEA – Kenneth Walker III – 15 rushes, 63 yards, TD
- SF – Christian McCaffrey – 15 rushes, 119 yards

Top receivers

- SEA – DK Metcalf – 10 receptions, 136 yards, 2 TD
- SF – Deebo Samuel – 6 receptions, 133 yards, TD

San Francisco racked up 505 yards of offense, as they overcame a first-half deficit by scoring 25 unanswered points during the second half.

Seattle gained 9 yards on the first play, but still had to punt as Kenneth Walker III was tackled for a 1-yard loss by Talanoa Hufanga and quarterback Geno Smith was sacked by Arik Armstead over the next two plays. 49ers' quarterback Brock Purdy then completed a 19-yard pass to Brandon Aiyuk and Deebo Samuel ran for a 22-yard gain as the team drove 48 yards in 7 plays to take a 3–0 lead on Robbie Gould's 34-yard field goal. The Seahawks went three-and-out again on their next drive, and San Francisco advanced the ball upfield for another touchdown, taking advantage of a 68-yard run by Christian McCaffrey and an 18-yard reception by running back Elijah Mitchell. Purdy finished the drive with a 3-yard touchdown pass to McCaffrey, giving San Francisco a 10–0 lead with 5:11 left in the first quarter.

Seattle responded by moving the ball 78 yards in 14 plays; Walker rushed the ball 5 times for 22 yards, the last carry a 7-yard touchdown run that cut the score to 10–7. The 49ers countered with Purdy completing 3 passes for 51 yards and rushing for 13 to push their lead up to 13–7 on Gould's 33-yard field goal halfway through the second quarter. The Seahawks took the ball back and drove to a 14–13 lead, advancing 71 yards in 5 plays and scoring on Smith's 50-yard pass to DK Metcalf. Following a punt from each team, Purdy completed a 31-yard pass to Aiyuk and an 18-yard pass to Samuel, setting up Gould's 46-yard field goal with 13 seconds left in the half. Seattle receiver Colby Parkinson returned the ensuing squib kick 14 yards to the Seahawks' 38-yard line. On the next play, Smith rushed for 9 yards, with an unnecessary roughness penalty against Jimmie Ward adding another 15 yards and enabling Jason Myers to kick a 56-yard field goal that gave the Seahawks a 17–16 lead at halftime.

However, the 49ers started the second half with three touchdowns and a field goal over their next four possessions. On their first drive of the half, the 49ers had a 15-play, 75-yard drive with Purdy completing passes to George Kittle and Samuel for gains of 23 yards and 21 yards, respectively, before taking the ball into the end zone himself a 1-yard run. Seattle's ensuing possession ended when Charles Omenihu forced a fumble from Smith that Nick Bosa recovered for the 49ers at their 30-yard line. San Francisco then drove 70 yards in 8 plays, the longest a 33-yard catch by Jauan Jennings. Purdy finished the drive with a 7-yard touchdown pass to Mitchell, and then threw a pass to Kittle for a 2-point conversion, giving the team a 31–17 lead. Following a Seattle punt, Purdy threw an 8-yard pass to Samuel, and with blocking from Kittle and Aiyuk, he took it to the end zone for a 74-yard touchdown. On the first play of Seattle's next possession, Deommodore Lenoir intercepted a pass from Smith and returned it 6 yards to the Seahawks' 37-yard line. The 49ers then drove 24 yards and scored on Gould's fourth field goal, this one a 31-yard kick that gave the team a 41–17 lead with less than 5 minutes left. Seattle then drove 76 yards in 15 plays, the longest a 24-yard catch by Cade Johnson, and scored the final points of the game on Smith's 3-yard touchdown pass to Metcalf.

Purdy—a rookie in his 6th NFL start—finished the game 18-for-30 for 332 yards and 3 touchdowns, while also rushing 4 times for 16 yards and a touchdown; McCaffrey rushed 15 times for 119 yards, while also catching 2 passes for 17 yards and a touchdown; Samuel was the team's top receiver with 6 receptions for 133 yards and a touchdown, while also rushing 3 times for 32 yards and Omenihu had 2 sacks and a forced fumble. For the Seahawks, Smith finished the day 25-for-35 for 253 yards, 2 touchdowns, and an interception, while also rushing 4 times for 28 yards; Metcalf was his top receiver with 10 receptions for 136 yards and 2 touchdowns.

==== AFC: Jacksonville Jaguars 31, Los Angeles Chargers 30 ====
Los Angeles Chargers vs. Jacksonville Jaguars – Game summary

Quarter	1	2	3	4	Total
Chargers	17	10	3	0	30
Jaguars	0	7	13	11	31

at TIAA Bank Field, Jacksonville, Florida

- Date: January 14
- Game time: 8:15 p.m. EST/5:15 p.m. PST
- Game weather: 45 °F (7 °C)
- Game attendance: 70,250
- Referee: Shawn Smith
- TV announcers (NBC): Al Michaels, Tony Dungy, and Kaylee Hartung
- Recap, Game Book

Game information

First quarter

- LAC – Austin Ekeler 13-yard run (Cameron Dicker kick), 13:33. Chargers 7–0. Drive: 2 plays, 18 yards, 0:40.
- LAC – Cameron Dicker 22-yard field goal, 5:30. Chargers 10–0. Drive: 12 plays, 57 yards, 4:32.
- LAC – Austin Ekeler 6-yard run (Cameron Dicker kick), 0:44. Chargers 17–0. Drive: 3 plays, 16 yards, 1:18.

Second quarter

- LAC – Gerald Everett 9-yard pass from Justin Herbert (Cameron Dicker kick), 7:12. Chargers 24–0. Drive: 11 plays, 62 yards, 6:24.
- LAC – Cameron Dicker 23-yard field goal, 4:25. Chargers 27–0. Drive: 4 plays, 1 yard, 0:49.
- JAX – Evan Engram 9-yard pass from Trevor Lawrence (Riley Patterson kick), 0:24. Chargers 27–7. Drive: 7 plays, 47 yards, 1:25.

Third quarter

- JAX – Marvin Jones 6-yard pass from Trevor Lawrence (Riley Patterson kick), 5:11. Chargers 27–14. Drive: 14 plays, 89 yards, 7:17.
- LAC – Cameron Dicker 50-yard field goal, 2:58. Chargers 30–14. Drive: 7 plays, 45 yards, 2:13.
- JAX – Zay Jones 39-yard pass from Trevor Lawrence (pass failed), 0:44. Chargers 30–20. Drive: 5 plays, 68 yards, 2:14.

Fourth quarter

- JAX – Christian Kirk 9-yard pass from Trevor Lawrence (Trevor Lawrence run), 5:25. Chargers 30–28. Drive: 9 plays, 70 yards, 3:22.
- JAX – Riley Patterson 36-yard field goal, 0:00. Jaguars 31–30. Drive: 10 plays, 61 yards, 3:09.

Top passers

- LAC – Justin Herbert – 25/43, 273 yards, TD
- JAX – Trevor Lawrence – 28/47, 288 yards, 4 TD, 4 INT

Top rushers

- LAC – Austin Ekeler – 13 rushes, 35 yards, 2 TD
- JAX – Travis Etienne – 20 rushes, 109 yards

Top receivers

- LAC – Gerald Everett – 6 receptions, 109 yards, TD
- JAX – Evan Engram – 7 receptions, 93 yards, TD

Jacksonville overcame five first-half turnovers and a 27–0 deficit to win on Riley Patterson's walk-off field goal. This was the third largest comeback in NFL postseason history.

On the second play of the game, Jaguars quarterback Trevor Lawrence's pass was intercepted by Drue Tranquill, who returned it 15 yards to the Jacksonville 18-yard line. This set up Austin Ekeler's 13-yard touchdown run to give the Chargers a 7–0 lead. Then on Jacksonville's next drive, Lawrence was intercepted again, this time by Asante Samuel Jr., who returned the ball 16 yards to the Los Angeles 39. From there, quarterback Justin Herbert completed 3 passes for 40 yards on a 57-yard drive to go up 10–0 on Cameron Dicker's 22-yard field goal. Following a punt from each team, Samuel recorded his second interception, returning this one for 4 yards to the Jaguars 16-yard line. Ekeler then took the ball to the end zone with three consecutive carries, the last one a 6-yard touchdown run that gave the Chargers a 17–0 lead with 37 seconds left in the first quarter.

Jacksonville was quickly forced to punt and the Chargers drove back for more points, this time going 67 yards in 13 plays, including Herbert's 23-yard completion to tight end Gerald Everett to convert a 3rd-and-11. On the last play, he hit Everett again for a 9-yard score, increasing the team's lead to 24–0. Jamal Agnew gave the Jaguars a chance to respond by returning the kickoff 52 yards to midfield. But after two incompletions, Lawrence threw his fourth interception of the day and third overall to Samuel. Then Jacksonville turned the ball over again when Chris Claybrooks muffed a Jags punt and Amen Ogbongbemiga recovered it on the Jaguars 6-yard line. Three plays later, Dicker kicked a 23-yard field goal to give Los Angeles a 27–0 lead with 4:28 left in the half. Jacksonville had to punt on their next drive, but their defense forced a crucial three-and-out that included a stop on 3rd-and-1, forcing a J. K. Scott punt that went just 34 yards before Tevaughn Campbell returned it 4 yards to the Los Angeles 47-yard line. Lawrence subsequently led the Jaguars 47 yards in 8 plays, including a 12-yard completion to Marvin Jones on 4th-and-1, to score on a 9-yard touchdown pass to Evan Engram, making the score 27–7 going into halftime.

Los Angeles took the second half kickoff and drove to the Jacksonville 38, but were stopped there and decided to punt. Scott's kick pinned the Jaguars on their own 11-yard line, but it didn't stop them from driving 89 yards in 17 plays. Lawrence completed 8 passes for 68 yards on the drive, the last a 6-yard touchdown completion to Jones that cut their deficit to 27–14. Herbert struck back with a pair of completions to Everett for gains of 21 and 25 yards to set up Dicker's 50-yard field goal, putting the Chargers up 30–14. Agnew returned the kickoff 36 yards to the Jaguars' 32-yard line. From there, Jacksonville drove 68 yards in 7 plays to score on Lawrence's 39-yard touchdown pass to Zay Jones, making the score 30–20 after the 2-point conversion failed.

Los Angeles got the ball back with 40 seconds left in the third quarter and managed to run the clock down to under nine minutes with a 17-play drive to the Jaguars 22-yard line, but came up empty when Dicker's 40-yard field goal went wide left. Jacksonville took over and drove 64 yards in 11 plays, with Lawrence completing a 21-yard pass to Engram and 3 passes to Christian Kirk for 35 yards, the last a 9-yard touchdown catch. Chargers defensive end Joey Bosa was penalized for unsportsmanlike conduct on the play, moving the ball to the 1-yard for the point after touchdown. The Jaguars took advantage of the penalty by going for two, scoring on Lawrence's 1-yard run to cut their deficit to 30–28 with 5:30 left in the game.

On the first play after the ensuing kickoff, Herbert was sacked for an 8-yard loss by Roy Robertson-Harris. He managed to complete passes on his next two plays, but they were not enough for a first down, and so the Chargers punted with 3:20 remaining. Jacksonville then put together a 10-play, 61-yard drive for the game-winning score. Three completions for 24 yards and an 8-yard run by Lawrence brought up first down at midfield. A few plays later, they faced a crucial 4th-and-1 on the Chargers 41-yard line. Travis Etienne took a pitch and ran around the right side of the line for a 25-yard gain to the Chargers 16. After running the clock down to the final seconds, Patterson's 36-yard field goal gave the Jags a win as time ran out. It is the largest blown lead in Chargers history as they became the first team to lose a playoff game with a turnover margin of +5.

Lawrence completed 28 of 47 passes for 288 yards and 4 touchdowns, with 4 interceptions, and rushed once for 8 yards. Etienne was the top rusher of the day with 20 carries for 109 yards and caught a pass for 12 yards. Engram had 7 receptions for 93 yards and a score. Agnew returned 4 kickoffs for 134 yards. Herbert finished 27 of 43 for 273 yards and a touchdown, while also rushing 3 times for 12 yards. Everett was his top target with 6 catches for 109 yards and a score. Samuel had 3 tackles and 3 interceptions. Ekeler, who had 1,637 yards from scrimmage and 107 receptions during the season, scored two touchdowns, but was held to just 13 carries for 35 yards and 2 receptions for 8 yards. Chargers coach Brandon Staley was later quoted as saying that "we choked", a sentiment also said by linebacker Kyle Van Noy.

Following the game, Los Angeles fired offensive coordinator Joe Lombardi and passing game coordinator & quarterbacks coach Shane Day.

=== Sunday, January 15, 2023 ===
==== AFC: Buffalo Bills 34, Miami Dolphins 31 ====
Miami Dolphins vs. Buffalo Bills – Game summary

Quarter	1	2	3	4	Total
Dolphins	0	17	7	7	31
Bills	14	6	14	0	34

at Highmark Stadium, Orchard Park, New York

- Date: January 15
- Game time: 1:05 p.m. EST
- Game weather: Sunny, 28 °F (−2 °C)
- Game attendance: 70,651
- Referee: Brad Allen
- TV announcers (CBS): Jim Nantz, Tony Romo, Tracy Wolfson, and Jay Feely
- Recap, Game Book

Game information

First quarter

- BUF – Dawson Knox 6-yard pass from Josh Allen (Tyler Bass kick), 7:57. Bills 7–0. Drive: 5 plays, 73 yards, 3:00.
- BUF – James Cook 12-yard rush (Tyler Bass kick), 5:07. Bills 14–0. Drive: 4 plays, 23 yards, 2:13.

Second quarter

- BUF – Tyler Bass 33-yard field goal, 12:46. Bills 17–0. Drive: 11 plays, 52 yards, 4:51.
- MIA – Jason Sanders 40-yard field goal, 7:34. Bills 17–3. Drive: 10 plays, 38 yards, 5:12.
- MIA – Jason Sanders 48 yard field goal, 2:15. Bills 17–6. Drive: 8 plays, 18 yards, 3:46.
- MIA – Jason Sanders 37-yard field goal, 1:15. Bills 17–9. Drive: 4 plays, 8 yards, 0:17.
- MIA – Mike Gesicki 7-yard pass from Skylar Thompson (Skylar Thompson–Tyreek Hill pass), 0:33. Tied 17–17. Drive: 4 plays, 18 yards, 0:20.
- BUF – Tyler Bass 39-yard field goal, 0:04. Bills 20–17. Drive: 6 plays, 54 yards, 0:29.

Third quarter

- MIA – Zach Sieler 5-yard fumble return (Jason Sanders kick), 13:59. Dolphins 24–20. Drive: 1 play, −18 yards, 0:08.
- BUF – Cole Beasley 6-yard pass from Josh Allen (Tyler Bass kick), 5:18. Bills 27–24. Drive: 5 plays, 33 yards, 2:11.
- BUF – Gabe Davis 23-yard pass from Josh Allen (Tyler Bass kick), 2:07. Bills 34–24. Drive: 5 plays, 68 yards, 2:07.

Fourth quarter

- MIA – Jeff Wilson Jr. 1-yard rush (Jason Sanders kick), 10:53. Bills 34–31. Drive: 11 plays, 75 yards, 6:14.

Top passers

- MIA – Skylar Thompson – 18/45, 220 yards, TD, 2 INT
- BUF – Josh Allen – 23/39, 352 yards, 3 TD, 2 INT

Top rushers

- MIA – Jeff Wilson Jr. – 10 rushes, 23 yards, TD
- BUF – Devin Singletary – 10 rushes, 48 yards

Top receivers

- MIA – Tyreek Hill – 7 receptions, 69 yards
- BUF – Stefon Diggs – 7 receptions, 114 yards

Despite having to start third-string quarterback Skylar Thompson, falling behind 17–0, and being outgained in total yards 423–231, Miami still managed to keep pace with the heavily favored Bills, falling just short when Buffalo's defense stopped them on consecutive plays when facing 3rd-and-1 on their final drive. This became the longest home game in Bills history, at 3 hours and 53 minutes.

Buffalo started the game with a drive to the Dolphins 32, but lost the ball due to an incompletion on 4th-and-3. Following a punt, Bills quarterback Josh Allen completed passes to Stefon Diggs for gains of 20 and 52 yards before connecting with tight end Dawson Knox in the end zone for a 6-yard touchdown. Then safety Dean Marlowe intercepted a pass from Thompson and returned it 10 yards to the Miami 23-yard line, James Cook’s 12-yard touchdown run that put the Bills up 14–0. Miami was quickly forced to punt again, and the Bills stormed back for more points, this time driving 57 yards in 12 plays, with Allen completing 3/5 passes for 41 yards and rushing for 8, before Tyler Bass' 40-yard field goal gave the team a 17–0 lead with 12:49 left in the second quarter.

The Dolphins finally managed to respond on their next possession. Thompson start it off with a 20-yard completion to Durham Smythe, and later threw one to Tyreek Hill for a 19-yard gain on the Bills 16-yard line. Jason Sanders finished the drive with a 40-yard field goal that cut the score to 17–3. On the Bills ensuing drive, Allen threw a pass that was intercepted by Xavien Howard and returned 49 yards to the Buffalo 47, leading to Sanders' 48-yard field goal that made the score 17–6 following a 23-yard drive. Buffalo then went three-and-out, and Cedrick Wilson returned their punt 50 yards to the Bills 27-yard line, resulting in Sanders' third consecutive field goal, this one a 39-yard kick, that reduced their deficit to 17–9. Then Allen threw another interception, this one to Jevon Holland, who ran it back 29 yards to the Buffalo 18. This time the Dolphins managed to get the ball into the end zone, scoring on Thompson's 7-yard touchdown pass to tight end Mike Gesicki. He also threw a pass to Hill for a 2-point conversion, tying the game at 17 with 33 seconds left in the half. Still, Buffalo managed to retake the lead at 20–17 before halftime, with Allen completing two passes for Gabe Davis for gains of 33 and 17 yards on the way to Bass' 39-yard field goal.

Miami took their first lead of the game, 24–20, just one minute into the second half when safety Eric Rowe sacked Allen and forced a fumble, which Zach Sieler picked up and returned 5 yards for a touchdown. But later in the quarter, cornerback Kaiir Elam intercepted a pass from Thompson on the Dolphins 33-yard line, leading to Allens' 6-yard touchdown pass to Cole Beasley that gave Buffalo the lead back, 27–24. Following a Miami punt, Allen completed passes to Quintin Morris and Beasley for gains of 12 and 29 yards before finding Davis in the end zone for a 23-yard touchdown completion, increasing Buffalo's lead to 34–24.

Miami responded on a drive where Thompson completed 4/5 passes for 59 yards on the way to Jeff Wilson's 1-yard touchdown run, narrowing the gap to 34–31 with just over 10 minutes left in the fourth quarter. Following three drives without points, Sam Martin's 44-yard punt gave the Dolphins the ball on their own 14-yard line with 4:24 on the clock. Thompson's 25-yard completion to Jaylen Waddle on 3rd-and-10 advanced the team to the 39. After an offsides penalty and an incompletion, his 14-yard pass to Waddle brought up 3rd-and-1 from the 48. On the next play, Salvon Ahmed was stuffed for no gain by linebacker Matt Milano. Now with just 2:29 left and no timeouts, Miami had to go for the conversion. However, they were pushed back 5 yards by a delay of game penalty before they could run their next play. Then on 4th-and-6, Thompson's pass was incomplete, enabling Buffalo to take over and run out the rest of the clock, picking up their last needed first down with two runs by Devin Singletary for 11 total yards.

Allen was 23/39 for 352 yards and 3 touchdowns, while rushing 4 times for 20, but was intercepted twice and lost a fumble. Diggs was the game's leading receiver with 7 catches for 114 yards, while Davis had 6 for 113 and a score. Milano had 10 tackles (8 solo) and 2 sacks. Thompson threw for 220 yards and a touchdown, but completed just 18 of 45 passes and was picked off twice. Hill was the Dolphins leading receiver with 7 receptions for 69 yards.

==== NFC: New York Giants 31, Minnesota Vikings 24 ====
New York Giants vs. Minnesota Vikings – Game summary

Quarter	1	2	3	4	Total
Giants	14	3	7	7	31
Vikings	7	7	7	3	24

at U.S. Bank Stadium, Minneapolis, Minnesota

- Date: January 15
- Game time: 4:40 p.m. EST/3:40 p.m. CST
- Game weather: None (indoor stadium)
- Game attendance: 66,721
- Referee: Adrian Hill
- TV announcers (Fox): Kevin Burkhardt, Greg Olsen, Erin Andrews, and Tom Rinaldi
- Recap, Game Book

Game information

First quarter

- MIN – Kirk Cousins 1-yard run (Greg Joseph kick), 8:23. Vikings 7–0. Drive: 12 plays, 75 yards, 6:37.
- NYG – Saquon Barkley 29-yard run (Graham Gano kick), 5:11. Tied 7–7. Drive: 5 plays, 75 yards, 3:12.
- NYG – Isaiah Hodgins 14-yard pass from Daniel Jones (Graham Gano kick), 1:03. Giants 14–7. Drive: 4 plays, 81 yards, 2:03.

Second quarter

- NYG – Graham Gano 25-yard field goal, 3:25. Giants 17–7. Drive: 20 plays, 85 yards, 10:52.
- MIN – K. J. Osborn 9-yard pass from Kirk Cousins (Greg Joseph kick), 0:45. Giants 17–14. Drive: 8 plays, 75 yards, 2:40.

Third quarter

- NYG – Daniel Bellinger 9-yard pass from Daniel Jones (Graham Gano kick), 11:37. Giants 24–14. Drive: 6 plays, 75 yards, 3:23.
- MIN – Irv Smith Jr. 3-yard pass from Kirk Cousins (Greg Joseph kick), 7:46. Giants 24–21. Drive: 8 plays, 75 yards, 3:51.

Fourth quarter

- MIN – Greg Joseph 38-yard field goal, 12:34. Tied 24–24. Drive: 12 plays, 56 yards, 6:38.
- NYG – Saquon Barkley 2-yard run (Graham Gano kick), 7:47. Giants 31–24. Drive: 12 plays, 75 yards, 4:47.

Top passers

- NYG – Daniel Jones – 24/35, 301 yards, 2 TD
- MIN – Kirk Cousins – 31/39, 273 yards, 2 TD

Top rushers

- NYG – Daniel Jones – 17 rushes, 78 yards
- MIN – Dalvin Cook – 15 rushes, 60 yards

Top receivers

- NYG – Isaiah Hodgins – 8 receptions, 105 yards, TD
- MIN – T. J. Hockenson – 10 receptions, 129 yards

The Giants had won two of the first three playoff meetings with the Vikings, all played in New York, most recently a 41–0 Giants victory in the 2000 NFC Championship. In Week 16 of the regular season, the Vikings beat the Giants 27–24 in Minneapolis. This was the Giants' first playoff game in six years, and the first for the Vikings in three years. It was also the Vikings' first home playoff game since the Minneapolis Miracle. This was the first career postseason game for both Brian Daboll and Kevin O'Connell as head coaches. This was the first playoff game between the Giants and the Vikings to be played in Minnesota.

The Vikings started with the ball and moved downfield with ease. Kirk Cousins was 7/7 for 48 yards on the opening drive, including four completions to Justin Jefferson, before he converted a quarterback sneak on 2nd-and-goal to give the team a 7–0 lead. The Giants, however, immediately responded with an 85-yard drive. After an opening play holding penalty, Daniel Jones gained 56 yards running and passing over the next four plays, the longest a 22-yard throw to Darius Slayton. On the next play, Saquon Barkley ran 29 yards to the endzone untouched to tie the game. Then the Vikings went three-and-out after failing to convert a flea flicker. Jones immediately connected with Slayton on a 47-yard catch and run. Then Barkley rushed for a 16-yard gain before Jones' 14-yard touchdown pass to Isaiah Hodgins gave the Giants a 14–7 lead. After another punt, the Giants went on a 20-play, 85-yard drive that lasted nearly 11 minutes, but had to settle for a 25-yard Graham Gano field goal after a touchdown was called off by an illegal shift penalty by Daniel Bellinger. Cousins started connecting with T. J. Hockenson on the next drive with completions of 27 and 28 yards, then found K. J. Osborn open for a 9-yard touchdown to make the score 17–14 before halftime.

The Giants extended their lead to 24–14 on the first drive of the third quarter when Jones hit Bellinger for a 9-yard touchdown pass after a 24-yard run by Barkley and a 32-yard catch by Hodgins. Cousins and the Vikings responded with another touchdown, this time to tight end Irv Smith after a 19-yard completion to Hockenson on 3rd-and-7, along with a 25-yard pass to Adam Thielen. After giving up points on the first four Giants drives, the Vikings defense finally stopped the Giants on a third-down sack of Jones by Danielle Hunter. Sensing an opportunity to take control of the game, the Vikings went on a long and methodical drive that extended into the 4th quarter. On 3rd-and-9 at the Giants 24, Cousins completed a pass to Hockenson and was tackled by Xavier McKinney and Tony Jefferson. Initially ruled a first down, replay confirmed Hockenson was tackled half a yard short of the line to gain. The Vikings lined up for a QB sneak and got the first down, but were flagged for a false start by OT Christian Darrisaw. Greg Joseph kicked the ensuing 38-yard field goal to tie the game at 24 with 12:34 to play.

Jones connected with Slayton and Richie James on consecutive plays to move the ball to midfield. Then Hodgins made a toe-tapping grab on the sideline to put the Giants in Vikings territory for a 19-yard gain, then Barkley took a screen pass 10 yards into the red zone after a key block by Kenny Golladay. James had a 4-yard catch on 3rd-and-5, and the Giants opted to go for the first down instead of the field goal, which Jones converted on a QB sneak. Barkley scored his second touchdown of the game on the next play on a 2-yard run to give the Giants a 31–24 lead with 7:47 on the clock. Then the Vikings went three-and-out. The Giants tried to burn clock and score to put the game out of reach, but Slayton dropped a potential game-winning catch and run on 3rd-and-15. The Vikings only got one first down on their final drive on a roughing the passer penalty on Dexter Lawrence. Cousins's third down attempt was batted down by Cordale Flott. On 4th-and-8, Cousins was forced to check down to Hockenson with McKinney in pursuit. McKinney made the tackle 5 yards short of the first down and the Giants got the ball back. The Vikings had no timeouts and the Giants kneeled the clock out.

The Giants advanced to play the Philadelphia Eagles and won their first playoff game since Super Bowl XLVI in the 2011 season. It was also their first win in Minnesota in 18 years. Of the 53 Giants on the active roster, 38 of them won their first career playoff games. The Vikings lost their first one-possession game all year despite finishing an NFL record 11–0 in such games during the regular season. Daniel Jones orchestrated his sixth game-winning drive of the season and became the first person in NFL history to accumulate 300-plus passing yards, 75-plus rushing yards, and 2-plus passing touchdowns in a playoff game. His 379 scrimmage yards in a playoff game set a franchise record by a Giants quarterback. Saquon Barkley only ran the ball 9 times for 53 yards, but tacked on two scores and an additional 56 yards on 5 catches. Kirk Cousins played well for the Vikings, throwing 273 yards, 2 passing touchdowns, and a rushing touchdown. T.J. Hockenson was the Vikings leading receiver with 129 yards on 10 catches and Justin Jefferson, despite his opening drive, only finished with 47 yards on 7 catches. Isaiah Hodgins had his first career 100-yard receiving game and finished with 8 catches, 105 yards, and a touchdown despite revealing he played through an ankle injury.

==== AFC: Cincinnati Bengals 24, Baltimore Ravens 17 ====
Baltimore Ravens vs. Cincinnati Bengals – Game summary

Quarter	1	2	3	4	Total
Ravens	0	10	7	0	17
Bengals	3	6	8	7	24

at Paycor Stadium, Cincinnati, Ohio

- Date: January 15
- Game time: 8:15 p.m. EST
- Game weather: Mostly clear, 35 °F (2 °C)
- Game attendance: 66,399
- Referee: Clay Martin
- TV announcers (NBC): Mike Tirico, Cris Collinsworth, and Melissa Stark
- Recap, Game Book

Game information

First quarter

- CIN – Evan McPherson 39-yard field goal, 8:22. Bengals 3–0. Drive: 14 plays, 54 yards, 6:38.

Second quarter

- CIN – Ja'Marr Chase 7-yard pass from Joe Burrow (kick failed, wide right), 14:56. Bengals 9–0. Drive: 10 plays, 60 yards, 6:07.
- BAL – J. K. Dobbins 2-yard pass from Tyler Huntley (Justin Tucker kick), 4:53. Bengals 9–7. Drive: 17 plays, 75 yards, 10:03.
- BAL – Justin Tucker 22-yard field goal, 0:07. Ravens 10–9. Drive: 9 plays, 40 yards, 2:31.

Third quarter

- CIN – Joe Burrow 1-yard rush from (Joe Burrow–Tee Higgins pass), 5:02. Bengals 17–10. Drive: 12 plays, 83 yards, 7:08.
- BAL – Demarcus Robinson 41-yard pass from Tyler Huntley (Justin Tucker kick), 2:13. Tied 17–17. Drive: 5 plays, 81 yards, 2:49.

Fourth quarter

- CIN – Sam Hubbard 98-yard fumble return (Evan McPherson kick), 11:39. Bengals 24–17. Drive: 9 plays, 80 yards, 4:15.

Top passers

- BAL – Tyler Huntley – 17/29, 226 yards, 2 TD, INT
- CIN – Joe Burrow – 23/32, 209 yards, TD

Top rushers

- BAL – J. K. Dobbins – 13 rushes, 62 yards
- CIN – Joe Mixon – 11 rushes, 39 yards

Top receivers

- BAL – Mark Andrews – 5 receptions, 73 yards
- CIN – Ja'Marr Chase – 9 receptions, 84 yards, TD

In a second half dominated by defense, Bengals defensive end Sam Hubbard's NFL postseason record 98-yard fumble return touchdown gave the team a lead they would never give up, enabling them to win despite gaining just 234 offensive yards.

Cincinnati running back Joe Mixon rushed 3 times for 19 yards and caught 2 passes for 9 as the team advanced 54 yards in 15 plays to score on Evan McPherson's 39-yard field goal on the game's opening drive. On the fifth play of Baltimore's ensuing drive, reserve linebacker Akeem Davis-Gaither intercepted a pass from Tyler Huntley on the Bengals 40-yard line. Cincinnati quarterback Joe Burrow subsequently completed 7/7 passes for 69 yards, the last a 7-yard scoring completion to Ja'Marr Chase that put the Bengals up 9–0 after McPherson missed the extra point, his fifth missed extra point kick of the season.

Taking the ball back seconds into the second quarter, Baltimore went on a 20-play, 72-yard drive that took 10:03 off the clock, the longest playoff drive in franchise history. Running back J. K. Dobbins carried the ball 5 times for 20 yards and scored on a 2-yard catch from Huntley by managing to barely stretch the ball across the goal line as he was being tackled, making the score 9–7 with less than 5 minutes left until halftime. At the end of the Bengals next drive, safety Kyle Hamilton forced and recovered a fumble from tight end Hayden Hurst on the Cincy 44-yard line. Baltimore then drove 40 yards in 9 plays, the longest a 19-yard completion from Huntley to Josh Oliver, and took a 10–9 lead on Justin Tucker's 22-yard field goal in the closing seconds of the quarter.

After forcing the Ravens to punt, Cincinnati started the second half with a 15-play, 88-yard drive. Burrow completed 6/6 passes for 65 yards, including a 19-yard pass to Chase and an 18-yard throw to Hurst on the Baltimore 1-yard line. Burrow scored a touchdown with a QB sneak on the next play. His ensuing 2-point conversion pass to Tee Higgins was incomplete, but a penalty of defensive back Marcus Peters gave Burrow another chance, and his next pass to Higgins was good, giving the Bengals a 17–10 lead. The Ravens quickly stormed back to tie the game 17–17, with Huntley throwing a 27-yard completion to Dobbins and a 13-yard pass to Gus Edwards before hitting Demarcus Robinson with a 41-yard touchdown bomb.

Following a Bengals punt, Baltimore got the ball with 54 seconds left in the third quarter and launched a drive deep into the red zone. After a 25-yard completion to Mark Andrews, Huntley took off for a 35-yard run before Jessie Bates managed to tackle him at the Bengals 2-yard line. Two plays later on 3rd-and-goal from the 1, Huntley attempted to stretch the ball over the line of scrimmage, but linebacker Logan Wilson knocked the ball out of his hands, right into the arms of Hubbard, who raced 98 yards down the field for a touchdown to put the Bengals ahead at 24–17 with 11:54 left in the game.

The defenses from both teams then took over as both teams punted twice. With 3:25 left on the clock, Ravens receiver James Proche returned Drue Chrisman's 49-yard punt 16 yards, with a penalty against defensive back Daxton Hill adding another 5 and giving Baltimore the ball on the Bengals 46-yard line. Huntley led the team to a first down on the Bengals 17-yard line, personally converting a 4th-and-1 with a 4-yard run along the way. But over the next 3 plays, Huntley threw incompletions and a holding penalty on lineman Kevin Zeitler pushed them back 10 yards. Now faced with 4th-and-20 from the Bengals 27 with 8 seconds left, Huntley was chased back to midfield before he launched a hail mary pass to the end zone. The ball was deflected in the end zone and then bounced off the fingertips of Proche as he attempted to make a diving catch, enabling Cincy to narrowly escape with the win.

Burrow completed 23/32 passes for 209 yards and a touchdown, while also rushing for 9 yards and a score. Chase was the game's leading receiver with 9 receptions for 84 yards and a touchdown. Starting in place of the injured Lamar Jackson, Huntley finished the day 17/29 for 226 yards, two touchdowns and an interception, while also rushing 9 times for 54 yards. Dobbins had 13 carries for 62 yards and caught 4 passes for 43 yards and a score. Hamilton had a forced fumble, a fumble recovery, and 9 total tackles (5 solo).

=== Monday, January 16, 2023 ===
==== NFC: Dallas Cowboys 31, Tampa Bay Buccaneers 14 ====
Dallas Cowboys vs. Tampa Bay Buccaneers – Game summary

Quarter	1	2	3	4	Total
Cowboys	6	12	6	7	31
Buccaneers	0	0	6	8	14

at Raymond James Stadium, Tampa, Florida

- Date: January 16
- Game time: 8:15 p.m. EST/7:15 p.m. CST
- Game weather: Clear, 56 °F (13 °C)
- Game attendance: 69,145
- Referee: Craig Wrolstad
- TV announcers (ABC/ESPN/ESPN2): Joe Buck, Troy Aikman, and Lisa Salters
- Recap, Game Book

Game information

First quarter

- DAL – Dalton Schultz 22-yard pass from Dak Prescott (kick failed, wide right), 6:28. Cowboys 6–0. Drive: 7 plays, 80 yards, 3:32.

Second quarter

- DAL – Dak Prescott 1-yard rush (kick failed, wide right), 6:13. Cowboys 12–0. Drive: 15 plays, 80 yards, 8:38.
- DAL – Dalton Schultz 11-yard pass from Dak Prescott (kick failed, wide left), 0:27. Cowboys 18–0. Drive: 11 plays, 91 yards, 3:05.

Third quarter

- DAL – Michael Gallup 2-yard pass from Dak Prescott (kick failed, hit right upright), 10:04. Cowboys 24–0. Drive: 8 plays, 86 yards, 4:07.
- TB – Julio Jones 30-yard pass from Tom Brady (pass failed), 0:00. Cowboys 24–6. Drive: 10 plays, 95 yards, 3:09.

Fourth quarter

- DAL – CeeDee Lamb 18-yard pass from Dak Prescott (Brett Maher kick), 10:13. Cowboys 31–6. Drive: 9 plays, 66 yards, 4:47.
- TB – Cameron Brate 8-yard pass from Tom Brady (Tom Brady–Mike Evans pass), 2:04. Cowboys 31–14. Drive: 11 plays, 52 yards, 2:39.

Top passers

- DAL – Dak Prescott – 25/33, 305 yards, 4 TD
- TB – Tom Brady – 35/66, 351 yards, 2 TD, INT

Top rushers

- DAL – Tony Pollard – 15 rushes, 77 yards
- TB – Rachaad White – 7 rushes, 41 yards

Top receivers

- DAL – Dalton Schultz – 7 receptions, 95 yards, 2 TD
- TB – Chris Godwin – 10 receptions, 85 yards

Dallas dominated the game, running up a 24-point lead and keeping the Buccaneers scoreless until 5 seconds remained in the third quarter. The only downside for the Cowboys was the performance of kicker Brett Maher, who missed the extra point kick on their first four touchdowns. His four misses were an NFL postseason record. This would end up being Tom Brady's final game before his retirement two weeks later.

The game started out sluggish as both teams failed to gain any net positive yardage on the first four drives. On the next possession, Dallas moved the ball 65 yards in 8 plays. Tony Pollard rushed 4 times for 25 yards, while quarterback Dak Prescott completed passes to Michael Gallup and Noah Brown for gains of 15 and 18 yards before connecting with tight end Dalton Schultz in the end zone for a 22-yard score. Tampa Bay took the ball back and drove to a 2nd-and-goal on the Cowboys 5-yard line. But on the first play of the second quarter, Tom Brady was intercepted in the end zone by safety Jayron Kearse. It was Brady's first red zone interception in his three seasons as the Bucs quarterback, a fact highlighted by commentator Joe Buck's statement before the play: "Inside the red zone—that's where they are, that's why the fire the cannons and that's where Tom Brady just simply does not turn the ball over."

After the turnover, Dallas drove 90 yards in 16 plays, the longest a 34-yard completion from Prescott to tight end Jake Ferguson. Prescott finished the drive with a 1-yard touchdown run on 4th-and-goal, increasing their lead to 12–0. Following a punt, Prescott completed 8/8 passes for 83 yards, including three to Schultz for gains of 20, 6, and an 11-yard touchdown pass, putting the team up 18–0 with 34 seconds left in the half.

Dallas scored again on their first drive of the third quarter. Prescott completed a 26-yard pass to Schultz on the first play, and later picked up another 26 yards on a pass to CeeDee Lamb, while Pollard rushed four times for 30 yards. Prescott finished it off with a 2-yard touchdown toss to Michael Gallup for a 24–0 lead. Later in the period, Bryan Anger's 42-yard punt pinned the Buccaneers back on their own 5-yard line. But this time they managed to score, with Brady completing 7/8 passes for 92 yards, the last a 30-yard touchdown to Julio Jones that made the score 24–6 after a failed 2-point attempt.

KaVontae Turpin returned the ensuing kickoff 35 yards to the 32-yard line. From there, Dallas drove 68 yards in 11 plays, with Prescott completing four passes for double-digit gains, the last an 18-yard touchdown completion to Gallup that made the score 31–6 and put the game out of reach. All Tampa Bay could do with the time remaining was convert Deven Thompkins' 14-yard punt return into a 52-yard drive to score the final points on Brady's 8-yard touchdown completion to Cameron Brate and subsequent 2-point conversion pass to Mike Evans.

Prescott completed 25/33 passes for 305 yards and four touchdowns, while also rushing 7 times for 24 yards and another score. Schultz was his top receiver with 7 receptions for 95 yards and two touchdowns, while Pollard rushed for 77 yards and caught 3 passes for 12. Brady finished his last game completing 35 of 66 pass attempts, just two attempts short of the all-time record, for 351 yards, 2 touchdowns, and 1 interception. Chris Godwin was the Bucs leading receiver with 10 receptions for 85 yards, while Jones had 7 for 74 and a touchdown. Thompkins returned 3 kickoffs for 58 yards and 3 punts for 34. With this result, the NFC East becomes first division since 1997 to have three teams make Divisional Round.

== Divisional round ==
=== Saturday, January 21, 2023 ===
==== AFC: Kansas City Chiefs 27, Jacksonville Jaguars 20 ====
Jacksonville Jaguars vs. Kansas City Chiefs– Game summary

Quarter	1	2	3	4	Total
Jaguars	7	3	0	10	20
Chiefs	7	10	3	7	27

at Arrowhead Stadium, Kansas City, Missouri

- Date: January 21
- Game time: 4:35 p.m. EST/3:35 p.m. CST
- Game weather: 37 °F (3 °C)
- Game attendance: 73,220
- Referee: Shawn Hochuli
- TV announcers (NBC): Mike Tirico, Cris Collinsworth, and Melissa Stark
- Recap, Game Book

Game information

First quarter

- KC – Travis Kelce 8-yard pass from Patrick Mahomes (Harrison Butker kick), 7:56. Chiefs 7–0. Drive: 12 plays, 83 yards, 6:00.
- JAX – Christian Kirk 10-yard pass from Trevor Lawrence (Riley Patterson kick), 5:04. Tied 7–7. Drive: 5 plays, 39 yards, 2:52.

Second quarter

- KC – Harrison Butker 50-yard field goal, 14:09. Chiefs 10–7. Drive: 11 plays, 43 yards, 5:55.
- KC – Travis Kelce 1-yard pass from Chad Henne (Harrison Butker kick), 3:54. Chiefs 17–7. Drive: 12 plays, 98 yards, 6:05.
- JAX – Riley Patterson 41-yard field goal, 0:27. Chiefs 17–10. Drive: 11 plays, 52 yards, 3:27.

Third quarter

- KC – Harrison Butker 50-yard field goal, 0:08. Chiefs 20–10. Drive: 5 plays, 29 yards, 2:17.

Fourth quarter

- JAX – Travis Etienne 4-yard rush (Riley Patterson kick), 11:49. Chiefs 20–17. Drive: 7 plays, 75 yards, 3:19.
- KC – Marquez Valdes-Scantling 6-yard pass from Patrick Mahomes (Harrison Butker kick), 7:08. Chiefs 27–17. Drive: 10 plays, 75 yards, 4:41.
- JAX – Riley Patterson 48-yard field goal, 0:25. Chiefs 27–20. Drive: 6 plays, 37 yards, 0:39.

Top passers

- JAX – Trevor Lawrence – 24/39, 217 yards, TD, INT
- KC – Patrick Mahomes – 22/30, 195 yards, 2 TD

Top rushers

- JAX – Travis Etienne – 10 rushes, 62 yards, TD
- KC – Isiah Pacheco – 12 rushes, 95 yards

Top receivers

- JAX – Zay Jones – 5 receptions, 83 yards
- KC – Travis Kelce – 14 receptions, 98 yards, 2 TD

Despite an injury late in the first quarter to starting quarterback Patrick Mahomes, Kansas City gained a double-digit lead in the fourth quarter and held on to win by forcing turnovers on two of Jacksonville's final three drives, advancing them to their fifth consecutive AFC title game.

After Jacksonville punted on the opening drive, Mahomes completed 7 of 8 passes for 69 yards, the last a 6-yard touchdown throw to tight end Travis Kelce. Jamal Agnew returned the kickoff 63 yards to the Chiefs 39-yard line. From there the team got to the end zone in seven plays, with Travis Etienne's 19-yard run setting up Trevor Lawrence's 10 yard touchdown pass to Christian Kirk that tied the score 7–7. Mahomes responded by completing 6 of 7 passes for 27 yards and rushing for 10 yards to lead the team to a 10–7 with Harrison Butker's 50-yard field less than a minute into the second quarter. However, he suffered an ankle injury on the drive and missed the next series.

At the end of the Jags next possession, Logan Cooke's 39-yard punt pinned Kansas City back at their own 2-yard line. But the Chiefs, now led by Chad Henne, still managed to drive 98 yards in 13 plays, featuring a 39-yard run by Isiah Pacheco. Henne finished the drive with a 1-yard touchdown pass to Kelce, giving the team a 17–7 lead with 3:58 left in the quarter. Jacksonville responded with Lawrence completing 3 passes to Kirk for 26 yards on a 52-yard drive the ended with Riley Patterson's 41-yard field goal, cutting their deficit to 17–10 going into halftime.

Mahomes returned to the game in the second half, but still was visibly hampered by the injury. Both Kansas City and Jacksonville punted on their first two possessions. Chiefs receiver Kadarius Toney returned Jacksonville's second punt 11 yards to the Kansas City 39-yard line. On the next play, Mahomes completed a 27-yard pass to tight end Noah Gray, setting up Butker's 50-yard field goal that gave the team a 20–10 lead with 12 seconds left in the third quarter.

Now down two scores, Jacksonville stormed back with their longest drive of the game, going 80 yards in 10 plays. Lawrence completed passes to Zay Jones for gains of 12 and 37 yards, while also scrambling for an 11-yard gain. Kirk also made a big play with an 18-yard run on an end-around play that gave the team a first down on the Chiefs 4-yard line. Etienne ran the ball in for a touchdown on the next play, making the score 20–17. But Kansas City struck right back, driving 70 yards in 13 plays, with Mahomes completing two passes to Kelce for 26 yards and one to JuJu Smith-Schuster for 16 yards. Following a 14-yard run by Toney on an end around, Mahomes finished the drive with a 6-yard touchdown pass to Marquez Valdes-Scantling, putting the team up 27–17 with just over 7 minutes left to play.

Agnew returned Kansas City's kickoff 42 yards to his own 45-yard line, with only Butker's touchdown-stopping tackle preventing him from taking it all the way. After that, Lawrence completed a 16-yard pass to Evan Engram and an 18-yard pass to Jones before his 11-yard run gave the team a first down on the Chiefs 9-yard line. On the next play, Agnew caught a pass, but lost the ball while being tackled by L'Jarius Sneed, Chiefs linebacker Nick Bolton recovered the fumble. After the Jaguars defense forced Kansas City to punt, Chiefs defensive back Jaylen Watson intercepted a pass from Lawrence that enabled the team to run the clock down to 1:04. Once Jacksonville got the ball back, Lawrence completed 3 passes for 37 yards to set up Patterson's 48-yard field goal, but the team failed to recover the onside kick, which allowed Kansas City to run out the clock.

Mahomes completed 22 of 30 passes for 195 yards and two touchdowns, while also rushing for 8 yards. Pacheco was the top rusher of the game with 12 carries for 95 yards, and caught a pass for 6 yards. Kelce caught 12 passes for 98 yards and two scores. Lawrence finished his second playoff game completing 24 of 39 passes for 217 yards, with a touchdown and an interception. He also had 3 carries for 26 yards. Etienne was the team's leading rusher with 10 carries for 62 yards and a touchdown, while also catching 3 passes for 18 yards. Agnew returned three kickoffs for 131 yards, and three punts for 23 yards, and had 7 yards from scrimmage.

==== NFC: Philadelphia Eagles 38, New York Giants 7 ====
New York Giants vs. Philadelphia Eagles– Game summary

Quarter	1	2	3	4	Total
Giants	0	0	7	0	7
Eagles	14	14	0	10	38

at Lincoln Financial Field, Philadelphia, Pennsylvania

- Date: January 21
- Game time: 8:15 p.m. EST
- Game weather: Cloudy, 38 °F (3 °C)
- Game attendance: 69,879
- Referee: Clete Blakeman
- TV announcers (Fox): Joe Davis, Daryl Johnston, Pam Oliver, and Kristina Pink
- Recap, Game Book

Game information

First quarter

- PHI – Dallas Goedert 16-yard pass from Jalen Hurts (Jake Elliott kick), 10:06. Eagles 7–0. Drive: 8 plays, 75 yards, 4:54.
- PHI – DeVonta Smith 9-yard pass from Jalen Hurts (Jake Elliott kick), 1:21. Eagles 14–0. Drive: 8 plays, 52 yards, 4:18.

Second quarter

- PHI – Boston Scott 3-yard rush (Jake Elliott kick), 7:29. Eagles 21–0. Drive: 9 plays, 63 yards, 4:52.
- PHI – Jalen Hurts 4-yard rush (Jake Elliott kick), 0:43. Eagles 28–0. Drive: 14 plays, 72 yards, 5:04.

Third quarter

- NYG – Matt Breida 8-yard rush (Graham Gano kick), 6:15. Eagles 28–7. Drive: 10 plays, 88 yards, 6:01.

Fourth quarter

- PHI – Jake Elliott 30-yard field goal, 5:16. Eagles 31–7. Drive: 15 plays, 70 yards, 7:56.
- PHI – Kenneth Gainwell 35-yard rush (Jake Elliott kick), 1:51. Eagles 38–7. Drive: 3 plays, 36 yards, 1:00.

Top passers

- NYG – Daniel Jones – 15/27, 135 yards, INT
- PHI – Jalen Hurts – 16/24, 154 yards, 2 TD

Top rushers

- NYG – Saquon Barkley – 9 rushes, 61 yards
- PHI – Kenneth Gainwell – 12 rushes, 112 yards, TD

Top receivers

- NYG – Richie James – 7 receptions, 51 yards
- PHI – DeVonta Smith – 6 receptions, 61 yards, TD

The Eagles dominated the game, outgaining the Giants in total yards 413–227 and scoring touchdowns on four of their first five possessions. The Eagles were particularly effective on the ground, racking up 268 rushing yards, the second highest postseason total in franchise history.

The Eagles started off the game with a 10-play, 75-yard drive featuring a 40-yard pass from Jalen Hurts to DeVonta Smith. His 16-yard touchdown pass to tight end Dallas Goedert gave the team a 7–0 lead. New York took the ball and drove to a 3rd-and-3 on the Eagles 35-yard line. But over the next two plays, quarterback Daniel Jones was sacked twice, first by Josh Sweat and Haason Reddick, and the second time by Reddick to force a turnover on downs. Philadelphia then drove 52 yards in 9 plays to take a 14–0 lead on Hurts' 9-yard touchdown pass to Smith. On New York's next drive, Jones threw an interception to James Bradberry, though the Eagles could do nothing with the ball and had to punt.

In the second quarter, Eagles running back Miles Sanders carried the ball 6 times for 43 yards on a drive that ended with Boston Scott's 3-yard touchdown run, putting the team up 21–0. The next time they got the ball, the Eagles advanced 67 yards in 15 plays, the longest an 18-yard run by Sanders. Hurts finished the drive with a 5-yard touchdown run, giving the team a 28–0 lead going into halftime.

New York finally managed to score in the third quarter, moving the ball 88 yards in 11 plays, including a 39-yard run by Saquon Barkley. Matt Breida's 8-yard touchdown run made the score 28–7. But in the final quarter, Philadelphia put the game completely out of reach on a drive where Kenneth Gainwell rushed 6 times for 49 yards to set up Jake Elliott's 30-yard field goal. The next time New York got the ball, they turned it over on downs on their own 36, leading to the final score of the game on Gainwell's 35-yard touchdown run.

Hurts finished his second playoff game with 16/24 for 154 yards and 2 touchdowns, while adding another 34 yards and a score on the ground. Gainwell, who rushed for only 240 yards during the season, was the game's leading rusher with 10 carries for 112 yards and a touchdown, while also catching a 9-yard pass. Sanders had 17 carries for 90 yards. Jones was limited to just 15/27 for 135 yards with 1 interception.

=== Sunday, January 22, 2023 ===
==== AFC: Cincinnati Bengals 27, Buffalo Bills 10 ====
Cincinnati Bengals vs. Buffalo Bills – Game summary

Quarter	1	2	3	4	Total
Bengals	14	3	7	3	27
Bills	0	7	3	0	10

at Highmark Stadium, Orchard Park, New York

- Date: January 22, 2023
- Game time: 3:05 p.m. EST
- Game weather: Snow, 34 °F (1 °C)
- Game attendance: 70,733
- Referee: Carl Cheffers
- TV announcers (CBS): Jim Nantz, Tony Romo, Tracy Wolfson, and Jay Feely
- Recap, Game Book

Game information

First quarter

- CIN – Ja'Marr Chase 28-yard pass from Joe Burrow (Evan McPherson kick), 11:40. Bengals 7–0. Drive: 6 plays, 79 yards, 3:20.
- CIN – Hayden Hurst 15-yard pass from Joe Burrow (Evan McPherson kick), 3:47. Bengals 14–0. Drive: 10 plays, 72 yards, 6:15.

Second quarter

- BUF – Josh Allen 1-yard rush (Tyler Bass kick), 7:25. Bengals 14–7. Drive: 15 plays, 75 yards, 7:41.
- CIN – Evan McPherson 28-yard field goal, 1:49. Bengals 17–7. Drive: 14 plays, 65 yards, 5:36.

Third quarter

- BUF – Tyler Bass 25-yard field goal, 7:42. Bengals 17–10. Drive: 14 plays, 65 yards, 7:18.
- CIN – Joe Mixon 1-yard rush (Evan McPherson kick), 1:18. Bengals 24–10. Drive: 12 plays, 75 yards, 6:25.

Fourth quarter

- CIN – Evan McPherson 20-yard field goal, 11:22. Bengals 27–10. Drive: 9 plays, 61 yards, 3:40.

Top passers

- CIN – Joe Burrow – 23/36, 242 yards, 2 TD
- BUF – Josh Allen – 25/42, 264 yards, INT

Top rushers

- CIN – Joe Mixon – 20 rushes, 105 yards, TD
- BUF – Josh Allen – 8 rushes, 26 yards, TD

Top receivers

- CIN – Ja'Marr Chase – 5 receptions, 61 yards, TD
- BUF – Dawson Knox – 5 receptions, 65 yards

Cincinnati gained 412 yards of offense, jumped to an early 14–0 lead, and held on for a solid win, never leading by less than 7 points after that as they advanced to their second consecutive AFC championship game. Their offensive line, missing three starters with injuries, proved up to the challenge as they only gave up 1 sack, while the team rushed for 172 yards and averaged 5.1 yards per carry. This was the team's fifth postseason victory over the last two seasons, the same number of wins the team had in their entire history prior to then.

Cincinnati took the opening kickoff and stormed 79 yards in 8 plays, with Joe Burrow completing 4/4 passes for 64 yards, including a 23-yard completion to Tyler Boyd, and finish the drive with a 28-yard touchdown throw to Ja'Marr Chase. Buffalo quickly had to punt and the Bengals marched back to score again, this time moving the ball 64 yards in 12 plays. Joe Mixon started the drive with two carries for 21 yards, while Burrow completed 5/5 passes for 41, ending on his 15-yard touchdown pass to tight end Hayden Hurst. By the time the first quarter ended, Buffalo trailed 14–0 and had gained just 8 total offensive yards.

Buffalo finally managed to get rolling on their first drive of the second quarter, scoring on a 17-play, 85-yard drive. Josh Allen completed passes to Stefon Diggs and Khalil Shakir for gains of 16 and 23 yards, while also converting a 4th-and-1 with a 2-yard sneak before taking the ball into the end zone himself for a 1-yard rushing score. Cincy countered by moving 70 yards in 16 plays, the longest an 18-yard pass from Burrow to Hurst. Evan McPherson finished the drive with 28-yard field goal, giving the Bengals a 17–7 lead with 1:43 left in the half.

Buffalo cut their deficit down to 7 points on the first drive of the second half, with Devin Singletary rushing 3 times for 16 yards and Shakir catching a pass for 17 on the way to Tyler Bass' 25-yard field goal. But this would be as close as they would get, as Cincinnati scored again on their next possession. This one went for 71 yards in 17 plays, with Mixon rushing 5 times for 25 and finishing it off with a 1-yard touchdown run that put the team up 24–10. Then Buffalo went three-and-out, and Sam Martin's 43-yard punt gave the Bengals the ball on their 37-yard line on the last play of the third quarter.

From there, Cincy drove 35 yards in 10 plays, 27 of them on four carries by Mixon. The Bengals also took advantage of a 26-yard pass interference penalty on Jordan Poyer on a play in which he also collided with fellow defensive back Tre'Davious White sending both of them to the sidelines with injuries and giving the Bengals a first and goal on the Bills 4-yard line. The defense still managed to keep Cincinnati out of the end zone, but McPherson's 20-yard field goal gave the team a 27–10 lead with just over 11 minutes left in the game. Buffalo took the ball back and drove to a 4th-and-6 on the Bengals 16-yard line. Allen attempted to pick up the first down with a pass to Gabe Davis, but cornerback Eli Apple broke it up to force a turnover on downs. Following a punt, Bengals rookie Cam Taylor-Britt sealed the victory by intercepting a pass from Allen in the end zone with a little over 1 minute remaining on the clock.

Burrow completed 23/36 passes for 242 yards and 2 touchdowns, while also rushing six times for 36 yards. Mixon rushed 20 times for 105 yards and a touchdown, while also catching 2 passes for 18. Allen completed 25/42 passes for 265 yards and an interception and had 8 carries for 26 yards and a score. Linebacker Matt Milano had 10 tackles (7 solo) and a sack.

==== NFC: San Francisco 49ers 19, Dallas Cowboys 12 ====
Dallas Cowboys vs. San Francisco 49ers– Game summary

Quarter	1	2	3	4	Total
Cowboys	0	6	3	3	12
49ers	3	6	0	10	19

at Levi's Stadium, Santa Clara, California

- Date: January 22, 2023
- Game time: 5:40 p.m. CST/3:40 p.m. PST
- Game weather: Clear 59 °F (15 °C)
- Game attendance: 71,888
- Referee: Bill Vinovich
- TV announcers (Fox): Kevin Burkhardt, Greg Olsen, Erin Andrews, and Tom Rinaldi
- Recap, Game Book

Game information

First quarter

- SF – Robbie Gould 26-yard field goal, 2:12. 49ers 3–0. Drive: 7 plays, 13 yards, 3:37.

Second quarter

- DAL – Dalton Schultz 3-yard pass from Dak Prescott (kick blocked), 9:25. Cowboys 6–3. Drive: 14 plays, 74 yards, 7:47.
- SF – Robbie Gould 47-yard field goal, 3:43. Tied 6–6. Drive: 10 plays, 46 yards, 5:42.
- SF – Robbie Gould 50-yard field goal, 0:00. 49ers 9–6. Drive: 8 plays, 40 yards, 1:15.

Third quarter

- DAL – Brett Maher 25-yard field goal, 9:08. Tied 9–9. Drive: 6 plays, 14 yards, 2:33.

Fourth quarter

- SF – Christian McCaffrey 2-yard rush (Robbie Gould kick), 14:58. 49ers 16–9. Drive: 10 plays, 91 yards, 6:00.
- DAL – Brett Maher 43-yard field goal, 11:03. 49ers 16–12. Drive: 8 plays, 32 yards, 3:55.
- SF − Robbie Gould 28-yard field goal, 3:08. 49ers 19–12. Drive: 13 plays, 64 yards, 7:55.

Top passers

- DAL – Dak Prescott – 23/37, 206 yards, TD, 2 INT
- SF – Brock Purdy – 19/29, 214 yards

Top rushers

- DAL – Ezekiel Elliott – 10 rushes, 26 yards
- SF – Elijah Mitchell – 14 rushes, 51 yards

Top receivers

- DAL – CeeDee Lamb – 10 receptions, 117 yards
- SF – George Kittle – 5 receptions, 95 yards

49ers quarterback Brock Purdy's storybook season continued as he won his 7th consecutive start and became the first rookie quarterback to lead his team to a conference championship game since Mark Sanchez in the 2009 season.

Following several punts, 49ers defensive back Deommodore Lenoir intercepted a pass from Dak Prescott and returned it 6 yards to the Cowboys 21-yard line. Purdy subsequently managed to convert a 3rd-and-16 with a 17-yard completion to Brandon Aiyuk on the Dallas 10, but the team could still not dent the end zone and had to settle for Robbie Gould's 26-yard field goal with 2:16 left in the first quarter.

Dallas responded by moving the ball 79 yards in 17 plays, the longest being an 18-yard completion from Prescott to Noah Brown. He later finished it off with a 4-yard touchdown pass to Dalton Schultz, giving the Cowboys a 6–3 lead after Brett Maher's extra point was blocked by Samson Ebukam, Maher's fifth missed extra point of the postseason. The 49ers managed to tie the game by driving 41 yards in 12 plays, taking advantage of a 15-yard penalty against Dallas and a 17-yard reception by Deebo Samuel, scoring on Gould's 47-yard field goal. Dallas took the ball back and drove to the 49ers 18-yard line, only to lose it on an interception by linebacker Fred Warner who returned it 16 yards to his own 28. Purdy then completed a 10-yard pass to Samuel and a 21-yard pass to Jauan Jennings, setting up Gould's 50-yard field goal to give the team a 9–6 lead on the last play of the half.

Dallas had to punt on their opening drive of the third quarter, but Kelvin Joseph forced a fumble from returner Ray-Ray McCloud, and Damone Clark recovered it for the Cowboys on the San Francisco 21-yard line. This led to Maher's 25-yard field goal that tied the game at 9. McCloud returned their kickoff 53 yards to the Dallas 47, but the team could not gain a first down and had to punt. Following another punt, San Francisco retook the lead with a 14-play, 76-yard possession. The highlight of the drive was a 30-yard completion from Purdy to tight end George Kittle, who had to fully extend his arms and tip the ball to himself, bouncing it off his helmet before securing it for a catch. Christian McCaffrey finished the drive with a 2-yard touchdown run, giving the team a 16–9 lead on the first play of the fourth quarter.

KaVontae Turpin returned the ensuing kickoff 44 yards to the Dallas 42, stopped from taking it all the way only by a tackle from Gould. From there, Prescott's three completions to CeeDee Lamb for 29 yards set up a 43-yard field goal to make the score 16–12. San Francisco then went on a 14-play, 64-yard drive, with Purdy completing a 17-yard pass to Kittle, while Elijah Mitchell carried the ball 8 times for 26 yards. Gould's 28-yard field goal put the team back up by 7 points with 3:08 left on the clock. The 49ers defense took over from that point, first forcing a punt, and later stopping Dallas on their own 32 as time expired in the game.

Purdy completed 19 of 29 passes for 214 yards, while also rushing for 8. Kittle was his top receiver with 5 receptions for 95 yards. Prescott completed 23 of 37 passes for 206 yards and a touchdown, while also rushing 4 times for 22 yards, but was intercepted twice. Lamb was the top receiver of the game with 10 receptions for 117 yards. Turpin returned 4 kickoffs for 120 yards.

== Conference championships ==
As per an annual rotation used by the NFL since 1997 and made official in 2002, the NFC Championship Game was the first game played at 3:05 p.m. EST, followed by the AFC Championship Game at 6:40 p.m. EST.

=== Sunday, January 29, 2023 ===
==== NFC: Philadelphia Eagles 31, San Francisco 49ers 7 ====
San Francisco 49ers vs. Philadelphia Eagles – Game summary

Quarter	1	2	3	4	Total
49ers	0	7	0	0	7
Eagles	7	14	7	3	31

at Lincoln Financial Field, Philadelphia, Pennsylvania

- Date: January 29, 2023
- Game time: 3:05 p.m. EST/12:05 p.m. PST
- Game weather: Rain, 51 °F (11 °C)
- Game attendance: 69,879
- Referee: John Hussey
- TV announcers (Fox): Kevin Burkhardt, Greg Olsen, Erin Andrews, and Tom Rinaldi
- Recap, Game Book

Game information

First quarter

- PHI – Miles Sanders 6-yard rush (Jake Elliott kick), 9:48. Eagles 7–0. Drive: 11 plays, 66 yards, 5:12.

Second quarter

- SF – Christian McCaffrey 23-yard rush (Robbie Gould kick), 8:29. Tied 7–7. Drive: 6 plays, 46 yards, 2:46.
- PHI – Miles Sanders 13-yard rush (Jake Elliott kick), 1:36. Eagles 14–7. Drive: 14 plays, 75 yards, 6:53.
- PHI – Boston Scott 10-yard rush (Jake Elliott kick), 0:16. Eagles 21–7. Drive: 3 plays, 30 yards, 0:55.

Third quarter

- PHI – Jalen Hurts 1-yard rush (Jake Elliott kick), 0:43. Eagles 28–7. Drive: 15 plays, 91 yards, 7:50.

Fourth quarter

- PHI – Jake Elliott 31-yard field goal, 5:17. Eagles 31–7. Drive: 9 plays, 30 yards, 5:35.

Top passers

- SF – Josh Johnson – 7/13, 74 yards
- PHI – Jalen Hurts – 15/25, 121 yards

Top rushers

- SF – Christian McCaffrey – 15 rushes, 84 yards, TD
- PHI – Kenneth Gainwell – 14 rushes, 48 yards

Top receivers

- SF – Deebo Samuel – 3 receptions, 33 yards
- PHI – DeVonta Smith – 2 receptions, 36 yards

San Francisco was unable to recover from injuries to quarterbacks Brock Purdy, Josh Johnson, Trey Lance and Jimmy Garoppolo. With no more healthy quarterbacks on their roster, the team only mustered 164 yards of offense, while also committing 11 penalties for 84 yards.

Philadelphia running back Boston Scott started off the game with a 29-yard kickoff return to his 34-yard line. Quarterback Jalen Hurts subsequently completed 5/7 passes for 54 yards, the longest a 29-yard throw to DeVonta Smith, who made a one-handed catch on 4th-and-3 to give the Eagles a first down on the San Francisco 6-yard line despite replays showing that he did not complete the catch. Miles Sanders ran the ball into the end zone from there to give the team a 7–0 lead. San Francisco took the ball and drove to midfield, but then Haason Reddick sacked Purdy as he was winding up for a pass, and Linval Joseph recovered it for the Eagles. Purdy's throwing arm was injured on the play, and he missed the rest of the half.

Several possessions later, 49ers punter Mitch Wishnowsky's 38-yard kick pinned the Eagles back at their own 6-yard line. Philadelphia ended up punting back to San Francisco from their 2, and Ray-Ray McCloud's 9-yard return gave them a first down on the Eagles 46-yard line. Running back Christian McCaffrey went on to get the ball on six of the 49ers next seven plays, gaining 44 of the drive's 46 yards and finishing it off with a 25-yard touchdown run in which he evaded 4 tackle attempts on the way to the end zone. The score was now tied with about 7 minutes left in the second quarter, but Philadelphia would go on to dominate the rest of the game. On their next drive, they took advantage of 3 penalties against San Francisco, marching 66 in 20 plays, the longest a 17-yard run by Kenneth Gainwell. Sanders completed the series with a 13-yard touchdown run, giving the team a 14–7 lead. On San Francisco's ensuing possession, Johnson fumbled a snap in shotgun formation. Reddick recovered the ball on the 49ers 30-yard line, setting up Scott's 10-yard touchdown run that increased Philadelphia's lead to 21–7 in the closing seconds of the first half.

On San Francisco's opening drive of the half, Johnson was knocked out of the game with a concussion, forcing the sore-armed Purdy back in to lead the team's offense. He would throw only two passes for the rest of the game. Midway through the third quarter, the Eagles went on another long scoring drive, this one covering 72 yards in 16 plays, one of them a 17-yard completion from Hurts to Gainwell on 3rd-and-5. Hurts also had a 14-yard run to give the team a first and goal, and eventually took the ball across the goal line himself on a 1-yard run. Now down 28–7, San Francisco lost the ball on their next drive attempting to convert a 4th-and-3 on their own 47-yard line. Gainwell then ran down the clock with 8 consecutive carries for 30 yards, setting up the final points of the game on Jake Elliott's 31-yard field goal with 5:20 left in the game.

Hurts completed 15 of 25 passes for 121 yards, while rushing 11 times for 39 yards and a touchdown. Reddick had 3 tackles (2 solo), 2 sacks, a forced fumble and a fumble recovery. Purdy and Johnson combined for just 97 passing yards. McCaffrey was the sole offensive star of the day with 15 carries for 84 yards and a touchdown, along with 4 receptions for 22 yards.

After the game, it was revealed Purdy had suffered a torn ulnar collateral ligament in his right elbow and would have to undergo surgery in the offseason.

This was the first NFC championship game since the 2001 NFL season to not be called by Joe Buck and Troy Aikman following their move to ESPN calling Monday Night Football. Buck and Aikman worked for the NFL on Fox since the 2002 NFL season as the lead commentator team for the network.

The 49ers' lack of a remaining healthy quarterback by the end of game led to a rule change enacted by the NFL in May 2023. The rule, informally referred to as the "Brock Purdy Rule", allows teams that only activate two quarterbacks for a game to play a third quarterback, but only if the first two quarterbacks are injured during that game. In this circumstance, calling in the third quarterback would not use up a roster spot for that team.

==== AFC: Kansas City Chiefs 23, Cincinnati Bengals 20 ====
Cincinnati Bengals vs. Kansas City Chiefs – Game summary

Quarter	1	2	3	4	Total
Bengals	0	6	7	7	20
Chiefs	3	10	7	3	23

at Arrowhead Stadium, Kansas City, Missouri

- Date: January 29, 2023
- Game time: 6:40 p.m. EST/5:40 p.m. CST
- Game weather: Cloudy, 22 °F (−6 °C)
- Game attendance: 73,426
- Referee: Ronald Torbert
- TV announcers (CBS): Jim Nantz, Tony Romo, Tracy Wolfson, Evan Washburn, and Jay Feely
- Recap, Game Book

Game information

First quarter

- KC – Harrison Butker 43-yard field goal, 8:50. Chiefs 3–0. Drive: 7 plays, 39 yards, 3:21.

Second quarter

- KC – Harrison Butker 24-yard field goal, 14:58. Chiefs 6–0. Drive: 12 plays, 61 yards, 6:18.
- CIN – Evan McPherson 30-yard field goal, 6:22. Chiefs 6–3. Drive: 13 plays, 63 yards, 6:22.
- KC – Travis Kelce 14-yard pass from Patrick Mahomes (Harrison Butker kick), 3:53. Chiefs 13–3. Drive: 8 plays, 75 yards, 4:43.
- CIN – Evan McPherson 23-yard field goal, 0:00. Chiefs 13–6. Drive: 12 plays, 90 yards, 2:03.

Third quarter

- CIN – Tee Higgins 27-yard pass from Joe Burrow (Evan McPherson kick), 9:54. Tied 13–13. Drive: 8 plays, 62 yards, 3:35.
- KC – Marquez Valdes-Scantling 19-yard pass from Patrick Mahomes (Harrison Butker kick), 4:15. Chiefs 20–13. Drive: 11 plays, 77 yards, 5:39.

Fourth quarter

- CIN – Samaje Perine 2-yard rush (Evan McPherson kick), 13:30. Tied 20–20. Drive: 6 plays, 45 yards, 2:25.
- KC – Harrison Butker 45-yard field goal, 0:03. Chiefs 23–20. Drive: 4 plays, 26 yards, 0:27.
- CIN – Joe Burrow – 26/41, 270 yards, TD, 2 INT
- KC – Patrick Mahomes – 29/43, 326 yards, 2 TD

Top rushers

- CIN – Joe Burrow – 4 rushes, 30 yards
- KC – Isiah Pacheco – 10 rushes, 26 yards

Top receivers

- CIN – Tee Higgins – 6 receptions, 83 yards, TD
- KC – Marquez Valdes-Scantling – 6 receptions, 116 yards, TD

Skyy Moore's 29-yard punt return set up a 45-yard field goal for Harrison Butker with 3 seconds left to send Kansas City to their third Super Bowl in the last four seasons.

Cincinnati had to punt on their opening drive, and Kadarius Toney's 12-yard return gave Kansas City the ball on their own 36 yard line. A pair of 16 yard completions from Patrick Mahomes to Isiah Pacheco set up Butker's 43-yard field goal to give the team an early 3–0 lead. The Bengals quickly had to punt again and KC storm back for another score, with Mahomes completing 6/8 passes for 69 yards as the team advanced to the Bengals 9-yard line. Pacheco scored on a touchdown run, but it was called back by a holding penalty and the Chiefs ended up settling for Butker's field 24-yard field goal on the first play of the second quarter. Kansas City had dominated the game up to then, gaining 110 yards and six first downs, while holding Cincinnati to 0 yards and one first down, sacking quarterback Joe Burrow three times.

Cincinnati responded on their next drive, as Burrow converted a 3rd-and-14 with a 16-yard pass to Tyler Boyd, and later hit him for a 24-yard gain to set up Evan McPherson's 30-yard field goal that made the score 6–3. Kansas City stormed right back 75 yards in 10 plays, including a 29-yard completion from Mahomes to Marquez Valdes-Scantling. On the last play, he converted a 4th-and-1 with a 14-yard touchdown pass to Travis Kelce, giving the team a 13–3 lead. On the Bengals next drive, Burrow threw a pass that was intercepted by Jaylen Watson and returned 10 yards to the team's 39-yard line. However, their defense managed to force 3 incompletions and a punt, which Tommy Townsend sent out of bounds at the Bengals 5-yard line. Aided by a 20-yard pass interference penalty against Bryan Cook that negated an interception by Juan Thornhill, Burrow led Cincinnati 70 yards in 13 plays, completing 8/10 passes for 62 yards before McPherson's 20-yard field goal on the last play of the quarter sent the teams into their locker rooms with a score of 13–6.

After forcing the Chiefs to punt, Cincinnati tied the score on their first drive of the second half, moving the ball 62 yards in 9 plays and scoring on Burrow's 27-yard touchdown pass to Tee Higgins. But the Chiefs stormed right back to retake it at 20–13, with Mahomes completing 3 passes to Valdez-Scantling for 52 yards, the last a 19-yard touchdown completion on 3rd-and-10. After Cincinnati punted, Mahomes led the Chiefs to the Bengals 43-yard line. But with a minute left in the third quarter, he fumbled the ball while winding up for a pass without being touched. Bengals defensive end Sam Hubbard recovered it on the Kansas City 45-yard line. The team soon faced 4th-and-6 from the Chiefs 40, but Burrow managed to convert with a long pass to Ja'Marr Chase, who made a leaping catch between two defensive backs for a 35-yard gain. This set up Samaje Perine's 2-yard rushing score that tied the game at 20–20 with 13:35 left in the 4th quarter.

After a Chiefs punt, Burrow was intercepted by Joshua Williams on the Chiefs' 14-yard line. Kansas City then drove a 3rd-and-12 on the Bengals 41. On the next play, Kansas City gained 4 yards and was penalized for holding. Rather than take the penalty, coach Zac Taylor decided to accept the results of the play, forcing Kansas City to decide on a punt or a long field goal. The Chiefs decided to punt, and got a big boost from Townshend, who kicked the ball out of bounds at the Bengals 6-yard line. Cincinnati subsequently drove to their own 35, featuring a 23-yard completion from Burrow to tight end Hayden Hurst on 3rd-and-16. But on 3rd-and-8, Burrow was sacked for an 8-yard loss by Chris Jones, forcing the team to punt the ball back to Kansas City with 40 seconds left on the clock.

Skyy Moore returned Drue Chrisman's 54-yard punt 29 yards to the Chiefs 47-yard line. On the next play, Mahomes completed a pass to Pacheco for 6 yards. Then when faced with 3rd-and-4 with 17 seconds left, Mahomes scrambled 5 yards for a first down. Bengals defensive end Joseph Ossai was penalized 15 yards for shoving Mahomes after he stepped out of bounds, giving Kansas City another 15 yards on the end of the run. Now with just 8 seconds left, Butker's 45-yard field goal gave the team a 23–20 win.

Playing on an injured ankle, Mahomes completed 29/43 passes for 326 yards and 2 touchdowns, while also rushing for 8 yards. Valdez-Scantling was the top receiver of the game with 6 receptions for 116 yards and a touchdown. Kelce had 7 catches for 78 yards and a score. Townsend planted 3 of his 4 punts inside the 20. Burrow completed 26/41 passes for 270 yards and a touchdown. He was also the team's leading rusher with 4 carries for 30 yards, but was intercepted twice and sacked 5 times. Higgins was the Bengals leading receiver with 6 receptions for 83 yards and a touchdown.

== Super Bowl LVII: Kansas City Chiefs 38, Philadelphia Eagles 35 ==
Super Bowl LVII – Kansas City Chiefs vs Philadelphia Eagles – Game summary

Quarter	1	2	3	4	Total
Chiefs	7	7	7	17	38
Eagles	7	17	3	8	35

at State Farm Stadium, Glendale, Arizona

- Date: February 12, 2023
- Game time: 6:40 p.m. EST/4:30 p.m. MST
- Game weather: Sunny, 77 °F (25 °C) (retractable roof open)
- Game attendance: 67,827
- Referee: Carl Cheffers
- TV announcers (Fox): Kevin Burkhardt, Greg Olsen, Erin Andrews, and Tom Rinaldi
- Recap, Game Book

Game information
First quarter
- PHI – Jalen Hurts 1-yard rush (Jake Elliott kick), 10:09. Eagles 7–0. Drive: 11 plays, 75 yards, 4:51.
- KC – Travis Kelce 18-yard pass from Patrick Mahomes (Harrison Butker kick), 6:57. Tied 7–7. Drive: 6 plays, 75 yards, 3:12.

Second quarter

- PHI – A. J. Brown 45-yard pass from Jalen Hurts (Jake Elliott kick), 14:52. Eagles 14–7. Drive: 5 plays, 68 yards, 2:32.
- KC – Nick Bolton 36-yard fumble return (Harrison Butker kick), 9:39. Tied 14–14.
- PHI – Jalen Hurts 4-yard rush (Jake Elliott kick), 2:20. Eagles 21–14. Drive: 12 plays, 75 yards, 7:19.
- PHI – Jake Elliott 35-yard field goal, 0:00. Eagles 24–14. Drive: 8 plays, 40 yards, 1:22.

Third quarter

- KC – Isiah Pacheco 1-yard rush (Harrison Butker kick), 9:30. Eagles 24–21. Drive: 10 plays, 75 yards, 5:30.
- PHI – Jake Elliott 33-yard field goal, 1:45. Eagles 27–21. Drive: 17 plays, 60 yards, 7:45.

Fourth quarter

- KC – Kadarius Toney 5-yard pass from Patrick Mahomes (Harrison Butker kick), 12:04. Chiefs 28–27. Drive: 9 plays, 75 yards, 4:41.
- KC – Skyy Moore 4-yard pass from Patrick Mahomes (Harrison Butker kick), 9:22. Chiefs 35–27. Drive: 3 plays, 5 yards, 0:49.
- PHI – Jalen Hurts 2-yard rush (Jalen Hurts rush), 5:15. Tied 35–35. Drive: 8 plays, 75 yards, 4:07.
- KC – Harrison Butker 27-yard field goal, 0:08. Chiefs 38–35. Drive: 12 plays, 66 yards, 5:07.

== Television coverage ==
All playoff games were televised nationally, split between the league's network television partners.

During Wild Card Weekend this postseason, Fox replaced CBS in televising two wild card games this year, with CBS airing only one wild card game. NBC again televised two games, and ESPN aired one game, simulcasted on ABC, with a Manningcast on ESPN2.

Coverage of the AFC Divisional games was split between CBS and NBC while CBS had exclusive coverage of the AFC Championship Game. Meanwhile, Fox had exclusive coverage of both NFC Divisional games, the NFC Championship Game, and Super Bowl LVII.

Games were again be streamed on each broadcaster's sister platform (except for Fox's service Tubi which does not air any live games), with Paramount+ simulcasted all CBS games, Peacock simulcasted all NBC games, and ESPN+ simulcasted the ESPN/ABC game (including Manningcast coverage).

Amazon did not stream any games this postseason. Nickelodeon also did not air any games or alternate broadcasts this postseason, and opted instead to only do an alternative broadcast of a Christmas regular season game.

For Spanish-language broadcasts, Fox Deportes aired Fox games, Telemundo (select games) and Universo aired NBC games, ESPN Deportes will have ESPN/ABC games and CBS games was available over SAP.

Westwood One Radio aired all playoff games on radio nationally alongside local radio stations airing their coverage locally.
