= James Hodgins =

American football player and coach (born 1977)

No. 42, 44
- Position: Fullback

Personal information
- Born: April 30, 1977 (age 49); San Jose, California, U.S.

Career information
- High school: Oak Grove (San Jose)
- College: San Jose State
- NFL draft: 1999: undrafted

Career history

Playing
- St. Louis Rams (1999–2002); Arizona Cardinals (2003–2005); New York Jets (2006)

Coaching
- Walnut Creek (CA) Berean Christian HS (2013–2018); Berkeley (CA) HS (2019–present)

Awards and highlights
- Super Bowl champion (XXXIV)

Career NFL statistics
- Rushing yards: 31
- Receiving yards: 178
- Touchdowns: 4
- Stats at Pro Football Reference

James William Hodgins (born April 30, 1977) is an American former professional football player who was a fullback in the National Football League (NFL). He played college football for the San Jose State Spartans.

== High school ==
Hodgins graduated from Oak Grove High School in his birthplace of San Jose, California, in 1995 and lettered in football, basketball, and track.

== College career ==
At San Jose State University, Hodgins played four years on their Spartans football teams from 1995 to 1998 seasons. He was a fullback for his first three seasons. In 1996 as a sophomore, Hodgins had 326 yards rushing on 70 carries and 116 yards on 16 pass receptions. As a junior in 1997, Hodgins rushed for 237 yards on 50 carries and made one 14-yard reception. In 1998 as a senior, Hodgins moved to the defensive line as a linebacker and made 18 tackles and 3 sacks. He graduated from San Jose State with a sociology degree in 1999.

== Professional career ==
=== St. Louis Rams (1999–2002) ===
Hodgins signed with the St. Louis Rams as an undrafted free agent following the 1999 NFL draft. As a rookie in 1999, Hodgins played 15 games, rushed for 10 yards in 7 carries with one touchdown, and made 6 receptions for 35 yards. On November 28, Hodgins scored his first NFL career touchdown on a one-yard run. Hodgins played in the divisional round game against the Minnesota Vikings. The Rams later won Super Bowl XXXIV.

In 2000, Hodgins again played 15 games and started two; his first start was in Week 11 (November 12) in which he made one 3-yard reception. In his next start on November 26, Hodgins did not make any receptions or rushes. Overall, Hodgins' statistics were very limited this season, with one reception for 3 yards and 2 rushes for 5 yards.

Hodgins started 10 of the 16 regular season games of the 2001 season and made 4 receptions for 24 yards and his first career receiving touchdown. He also had 5 rushing yards on 2 carries. Hodgins also played in all three postseason games, including the Rams' Super Bowl XXXVI loss to the New England Patriots. In the Super Bowl, Hodgins made a 3-yard rush and 8-yard reception.

Due to a broken foot, Hodgins did not play the first seven games of the 2002 season. Hodgins then started 8 of the last 9 games. He rushed for 7 yards on 3 carries and made 9 catches for 47 yards. Hodgins became a free agent after the 2002 season.

=== Arizona Cardinals (2003–2005) ===
In 2003, Hodgins signed a four-year deal worth a reported $5 million with the Arizona Cardinals. In the 2003 season Hodgins started 8 of 16 games and rushed for 6 yards on 2 carries and made 14 receptions for 58 yards and two touchdowns. Hodgins spent the 2004 season on injured reserve due to an injured shoulder. In the 2005 season, Hodgins played only one game.

=== New York Jets (2006) ===
In six games with the New York Jets in 2006, Hodgins made 2 receptions for 9 yards. Hodgins returned a kickoff for 17 yards in the October 22 game against the Detroit Lions.

== Personal life ==
Hodgins lives in Oakley, California and works as a Christian motivational speaker and high school football coach. After being head coach at Berean Christian High School in Walnut Creek, California, from 2013 to 2018, Hodgins became head coach at Berkeley High School in 2019.

In June 2010, Hodgins was arrested and charged with fraudulently renting out homes he did not own. Hodgins pled guilty and complied with terms of an agreement requiring him to reimburse victims and obey the law for one year. He then went on to voluntarily make restitution above what was required.

His sons Isaiah and Isaac both played college football at Oregon State, with Isaiah eventually going to the Buffalo Bills in the 2020 NFL draft.
