= Berean Christian High School (Walnut Creek, California) =

Location
- 245 El Divisadero Avenue; Walnut Creek, California 94598; 37°54′50″N 122°01′57″W

Information
- School type: Private
- Founded: 1969
- NCES School ID: 00081443
- Head of school: Nicholas Harris
- Grades: 9-12
- Enrollment: 420 (2016)
- Language: English with other language classes provided (Spanish and ASL)
- Colors: Blue, gold, and white
- Mascot: Eagle
- Website: https://www.bereanchristian.com/

Berean Christian High School is a private Christian high school in Walnut Creek, California, United States, serving ninth through twelfth. Its name comes from the Bereans in Acts 17:11. The school has served the East Bay since 1969, having moved to its current Walnut Creek campus in 1985.

== Athletics ==
Berean Christian is a CIF North Coast Section Division V school. Its athletic department oversees eighteen competitive varsity athletic teams (nine men's, nine women's).

== Notable alumni ==
- Cassie Randolph (2015), The Bachelor winner
- Mason Filippi (2016), auto racing driver
- Isaiah Hodgins (2017), wide receiver for the San Francisco 49ers

== Notable faculty ==
- Nick Harris (teacher and principal), former NFL punter
- James Hodgins (former football coach), former NFL fullback
