= Isaiah Hodgins =

American football player (born 1998)

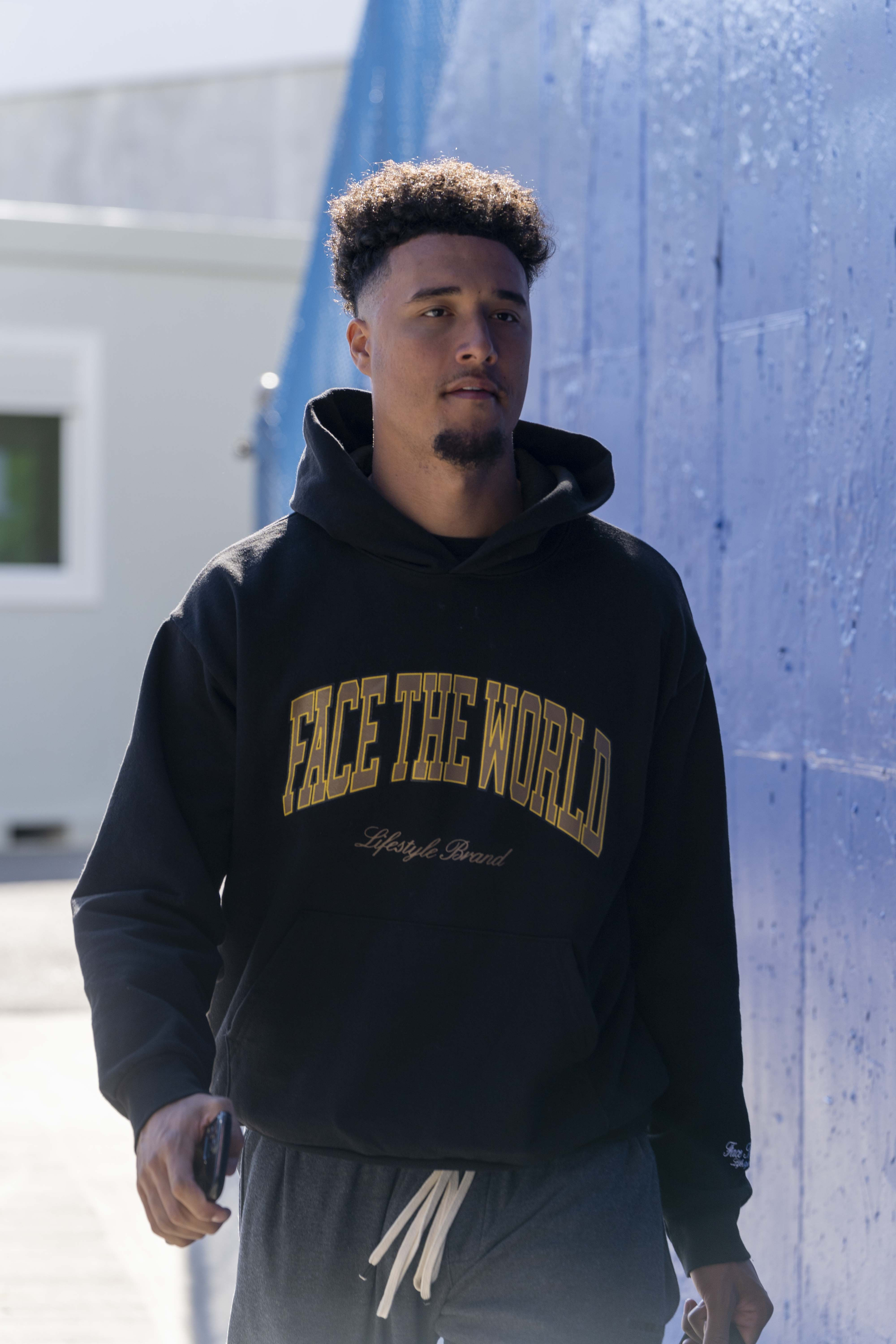
- Hodgins in 2021

Profile
- Position: Wide receiver

Personal information
- Born: October 21, 1998 (age 28); San Jose, California, U.S.
- Listed height: 6 ft 4 in (1.93 m)
- Listed weight: 200 lb (91 kg)

Career information
- High school: Berean Christian (Walnut Creek, California)
- College: Oregon State (2017–2019)
- NFL draft: 2020: 6th round, 207th overall pick

Career history
- Buffalo Bills (2020–2022); New York Giants (2022–2024); San Francisco 49ers (2025)*; Pittsburgh Steelers (2025)*; New York Giants (2025); Pittsburgh Steelers (2026)*
- * Offseason or practice squad member only

Awards and highlights
- Second-team All-Pac-12 (2019)

Career NFL statistics as of 2025
- Receptions: 70
- Receiving yards: 749
- Receiving touchdowns: 8
- Stats at Pro Football Reference

Isaiah Hodgins (born October 21, 1998) is an American professional football wide receiver. He played college football for the Oregon State Beavers and was selected by the Buffalo Bills in the sixth round of the 2020 NFL draft.

== Early life ==
Hodgins attended Berean Christian High School in Walnut Creek, California. A 4-star recruit, he committed to Oregon State University (OSU) to play college football over offers from Nebraska, Oregon, and Washington State, among others.

== College career ==
Hodgins entered his true freshman year at Oregon State in 2017 as a starter. Overall he started six of 11 games, catching 31 passes for 275 yards and two touchdowns. As a sophomore in 2018, he started nine of 11 games, recording 59 receptions for 876 yards and five touchdowns. He returned as a starter his junior year in 2019. Following a junior season where he caught 86 passes for 1,171 yards and 13 touchdowns, Hodgins announced that he would forgo his senior season and declared for the 2020 NFL draft.

=== Statistics ===
Season	Team	GP	Receiving				
Season	Team	GP	Rec	Yds	Avg	Lng	TD
2017	Oregon State	11	31	275	8.9	21	2
2018	Oregon State	11	59	876	14.8	51	5
2019	Oregon State	12	86	1,171	13.6	42	13
Career		34	176	2,322	13.2	51	20
Stats from Oregon State Beavers Website

== Professional career ==
Pre-draft measurables
Height	Weight	Arm length	Hand span	Wingspan	40-yard dash	10-yard split	20-yard split	20-yard shuttle	Three-cone drill	Vertical jump	Broad jump	Bench press
6 ft 3 5/8 in (1.92 m)	210 lb (95 kg)	33 1/8 in (0.84 m)	9 7/8 in (0.25 m)	6 ft 8 1/2 in (2.04 m)	4.61 s	1.55 s	2.66 s	4.12 s	7.01 s	36.5 in (0.93 m)	10 ft 4 in (3.15 m)	9 reps
All values from NFL Combine

=== Buffalo Bills ===
The Buffalo Bills selected Hodgins in the sixth round, 207th overall, of the 2020 NFL Draft. On May 7, 2020, Hodgins signed a four-year, $3.45 million contract, including a $158,888 signing bonus, with the Bills. He was placed on injured reserve on September 6, 2020. He was designated to return from injured reserve on November 24, and began practicing with the team again, but underwent shoulder surgery on December 8 and missed the remainder of the season.

On August 31, 2021, Hodgins was waived from the Bills and re-signed to the practice squad the next day. On December 26, 2021, Hodgins made his NFL debut in the Bills' week 16 game against the New England Patriots. After the Bills were eliminated in the Divisional Round of the 2021 playoffs, he signed a reserve/future contract on January 24, 2022.

On August 30, 2022, Hodgins was waived by the Bills and signed to the practice squad the next day. He was promoted to the active roster on October 8. Hodgins caught his first four NFL passes in a 38–3 week 5 win over the Pittsburgh Steelers. He was waived on November 1.

=== New York Giants (first stint) ===
On November 2, 2022, the New York Giants claimed Hodgins off waivers. He emerged as a key member of the Giants' offense during the second half of their 2022 season, catching touchdowns in four of his last five regular season games and racking up 351 yards on 33 receptions.

During the NFC wild card round playoff game against the Minnesota Vikings, Hodgins finished with 105 receiving yards and a touchdown on eight receptions as the Giants earned a 31-24 victory.

On February 16, 2023, the Giants re-signed Hodgins on a one-year contract. In the 2023 season, he appeared in all 17 games and started nine in the 2023 season. He finished the season with 21 receptions for 230 yards and three touchdowns.

On August 27, 2024, Hodgins was waived by the Giants and re-signed to the practice squad.

=== San Francisco 49ers ===
On January 7, 2025, Hodgins signed a reserve/future contract with the San Francisco 49ers. He was released on August 26 as part of final roster cuts.

=== Pittsburgh Steelers (first stint) ===
On September 17, 2025, Hodgins signed with the Pittsburgh Steelers' practice squad.

=== New York Giants (second stint) ===
On November 13, 2025, the New York Giants signed Hodgins off the Steelers' practice squad, reuniting himself with head coach Brian Daboll.

On March 11, 2026, Hodgins re-signed with the Giants on a one-year contract. He was released by the Giants as a part of preliminary roster cuts on August 29.

=== Pittsburgh Steelers (second stint) ===
On September 22, 2026, Hodgins signed with the Pittsburgh Steelers' practice squad. On November 18, he was released.

== Personal life ==
Hodgins' parents are Stephanie and James Hodgins. His father was a fullback in the NFL, winning a Super Bowl with the St. Louis Rams. His brother, Isaac, plays college football at Oregon State at the defensive line position. Hodgins is a Christian.
